= Roads in Cape Verde =

This article is related to roads in Cape Verde. There are three categories of national roads (EN1, EN2, EN3), rural roads (ER) and municipal roads (EM). Municipal roads are managed by the municipalities, the national and rural roads are managed by the Instituto de Estradas. The total length of the national road network is 1,113 km; the total length of the municipal road networks is 537 km. Of the national roads, 36% (by length) is asphalted. EN1 are first class national roads, EN2 are second class national roads and EN3 are third class national roads. Next is the first two letters which represent the island abbreviation, then the number. Only national roads are listed below.

== Boa Vista ==
Number	Route
EN1-BV01	Sal Rei - Rabil
EN3-BV01	Rabil - Cabeça dos Tarrafes
EN3-BV02	EN1-BV01 - Bofarreira - EN3-BV01
EN3-BV03	Rabil - Povoação Velha
EN3-BV04	EN3-BV03 - Lacação
EN3-BV05	Rabil - Estância de Baixo

== Brava ==
Number	Route
EN3-BR01	Furna - Nova Sintra
EN3-BR02	Nova Sintra - Nossa Senhora do Monte
EN3-BR03	EN3-BR02 - Esperadinha
EN3-BR04	Nossa Senhora do Monte - Tantum

== Fogo ==
Number	Route
EN1-FG01	São Filipe - Galinheiro - Mosteiros - Cova Figueira - Patim - São Filipe (Anel Principal)
EN1-FG02	São Filipe - Vale de Cavaleiros
EN2-FG01	São Filipe - São Filipe Airport
EN3-FG01	EN1-FG01 - Figueira Pavão - Achada Furna - Monte Grande - Lomba (Anel Superior)
EN3-FG02	São Filipe - Tongom - Lomba
EN3-FG03	Patim - Monte Grande
EN3-FG04	Salto - Monte Largo
EN3-FG05	Achada Furna - Chã das Caldeiras
EN3-FG06	Tongom - Lagariça
EN3-FG07	Cova Figueira - Estância Roque
EN3-FG08	Corvo - Relva
EN3-FG09	Mosteiros - Pai António

== Maio ==
Number	Route
EN3-MA01	Porto Inglês - Calheta - Cascabulho - Pilão Cão - Figueira - Porto Inglês
EN3-MA02	Figueira - Ribeira Dom João

== Sal ==
Number	Route
EN1-SL01	Espargos - Santa Maria
EN1-SL02	Palmeira - Espargos
EN3-SL01	Santa Maria - Ponta do Sinó
EN3-SL02	Espargos - Pedra de Lume

== Santiago ==
Number	Route
EN1-ST01	North Praia - São Domingos - João Teves - Assomada - Tarrafal
EN1-ST02	Ribeirão Chiqueiro - Pedra Badejo - Calheta de São Miguel - Achada Monte - Tarrafal (Variante Tarrafal)
EN1-ST03	João Teves - Achada Fazenda
EN1-ST04	Boa Entrada - Calheta de São Miguel
EN1-ST05	West Praia - São Martinho Grande - Cidade Velha
EN1-ST06	West Praia - North Praia - Praia Airport - Praia Harbor (Circular da Praia)
EN3-ST01	North Praia - Vale da Custa
EN3-ST02	Northwest Praia - Hospital Trindade
EN3-ST03	Northwest Praia - João Varela - EN3-ST07
EN3-ST04	São Martinho Pequeno - São Martinho Grande
EN3-ST05	Cidade Velha - Porto Gouveia - Porto Mosquito
EN3-ST06	Cidade Velha - Santana
EN3-ST07	EN3-ST06 - Rui Vaz
EN3-ST08	Porto Gouveia - Belém - Pico Leão
EN3-ST09	São Domingos - Rui Vaz - Monte Tchota
EN3-ST10	São Domingos - Água de Gato
EN3-ST11	EN1-ST01 - Banana - Barragem de Poilão
EN3-ST12	João Teves - Longueira
EN3-ST13	João Teves - Montanha - EN1-ST03
EN3-ST14	Milho Branco - Praia Baixo
EN3-ST15	EN1-ST02 - Porto Madeira
EN3-ST16	Milho Branco - Moia Moia
EN3-ST17	Picos - Jalalo Ramos
EN3-ST18	Fundura - Ribeira da Barca
EN3-ST19	Assomada - Boa Entradinha
EN3-ST20	Cruz Grande - Saltos Acima - Achada Lage
EN3-ST21	Assomada - João Bernardo (- Porto Mosquito)
EN3-ST22	Assomada - Porto Rincão
EN3-ST23	Cruz Grande - Tomba Touro
EN3-ST24	EN1-ST02 - Pilão Cão
EN3-ST25	EN1-ST02 - Hortelão
EN3-ST26	Chão Bom - Ribeira da Prata - Fundura
EN3-ST27	Trás os Montes - Chão de Junco
EN3-ST28	Trás os Montes - Ponta Furna
EN3-ST29	EN1-ST02 - Chão de Junco

== Santo Antão ==
Number	Route
EN1-SA01	Ribeira Grande - Corda - Lombo de Figueira - Porto Novo
EN1-SA02	Ponta do Sol - Ribeira Grande - Pombas
EN1-SA03	Porto Novo - Janela - Pombas
EN1-SA04	Porto Novo - Ponte Sul
EN3-SA01	Ribeira Grande - Xoxo
EN3-SA02	Ribeira Grande - Coculi - Garça de Cima
EN3-SA03	Ribeira Grande - Pinhão
EN3-SA04	Coculi - João Afonso
EN3-SA05	Boca de Ambas Ribeiras - Caibros
EN3-SA06	Manta Velha - Chã de Igreja
EN3-SA07	EN3-SA09 - Alto Mira
EN3-SA08	Esponjeiro - Lagoa
EN3-SA09	Ponte Sul - Ribeira da Cruz
EN3-SA10	Ponte Sul - Tarrafal de Monte Trigo

== São Nicolau ==
Number	Route
EN1-SN01	Ribeira Brava - Carvoeiros - Cachaço - Tarrafal de São Nicolau
EN2-SN01	Ribeira Brava - São Nicolau Airport
EN3-SN01	Tarrafal de São Nicolau - Barril - Praia Branca - Ribeira Prata
EN3-SN02	Ribeira Brava - Juncalinho - Carriçal
EN3-SN03	São Nicolau Airport - Preguiça
EN3-SN04	Ribeira Brava - Agua das Patas
EN3-SN05	Cachaço - Monte Gordo
EN3-SN06	Carvoeiros - Queimadas - Fajã de Baixo
EN3-SN07	Ribeira Brava - Caleijão - Preguiça Airport

== São Vicente ==
Number	Route
EN1-SV01	Mindelo - Cesária Évora Airport
EN2-SV01	Mindelo - Baía das Gatas
EN2-SV02	Mindelo - Calhau
EN3-SV01	Cesária Évora Airport - São Pedro
EN3-SV02	EN2-SV01 - Salamansa
EN3-SV03	EN2-SV01 - Monte Verde
EN3-SV04	EN1-SV01 - Morro Branco
EN3-SV05	Calhau - Baía das Gatas

== See also ==
- Transport in Cape Verde
- List of countries by road network size
