= CD Barcelona Tarrafal =

Former association football club in Cape Verde

Barcelona
- Full name: Clube Desportivo Amabox Barcelona Tarrafal
- Founded: July 31, 1995
- Dissolved: c. 2016 or 2017
- Ground: Estádio Municipal; Tarrafal on Santiago Island, Cape Verde

Clube Desportivo Amabox (or Amabos) Barcelona Tarrafal (also in Portuguese for Barcelona, Capeverdean Crioulo, ALUPEC or ALUPEK: Barselona also in the São Vicente Crioulo) was a football (soccer) club that played in the Santiago Island League North in Cape Verde. The team was based in the town of Tarrafal in the northern part of the island of Santiago. The team was founded in 1995 and its logo and uniform rarely equals to that of the Spanish club Barcelona FC, it is predominantly different as the club is also known as Amabos Barcelona or Amabos Barcelona Tarrafal. The team two titles, one in 2000 and their recent in 2003. Since 2011/12, the club had been absent from Santiago North competition, and not long after, the club was dissolved, no merger was made.

The home stadium is the Municipal Stadium (Estádio Municipal) located roughly 1 km south on a branch road connecting the road to the national capital of Praia, its location is approximately halfway between Tarrafal and Chão Bom.

The club's greatest player was Janício Martins who played from 1997 to 2002.

== Honours ==
- Santiago Island League (North): 2

1999/00, 2002/03

== League and cup history ==
=== National championship ===
Season	Div.	Pos.	Pl.	W	D	L	GS	GA	GD	P	Cup	Notes	Playoffs
2003	1B	1	5	0	3	2	4	8	-4	3		Did not advance	Did not participate

=== Island/Regional Championship ===
Season	Div.	Pos.	Pl.	W	D	L	GS	GA	GD	P	Notes
1999–2000	2	1	-	-	-	-	-	-	-	-	Promoted into the National Championships
2002–03	2	1	4	2	2	0	7	2	+5	8	Promoted into the National Championships after Second Stage
