= Achada (disambiguation) =

Achada, São Miguel Island, Azores.

Achada may also refer to:

- Achada Fazenda, Santiago Island, Cape Verde
- Achada Furna, Fogo Island, Cape Verde
- Achada Grande, Fogo Island, Cape Verde
- Achada Igreja, an alternative name of Picos, Cape Verde
- Achada Leitão, Santiago Island, Cape Verde
- Achada Monte, Santiago Island, Cape Verde
- Achada Tenda, Santiago Island, Cape Verde
- Ribeira da Achada, a stream and a settlement on the island of Madeira

== See also ==
- Achadinha ("little Achada"), São Miguel Island, Azores
