= Covão Grande =

- Settlement
- Coordinates: 15.098°N 23.646°W
- Country: Cape Verde
- Island: Santiago
- Municipality: São Salvador do Mundo
- Civil parish: São Salvador do Mundo

Population (2010)
  - Total: 478
- ID: 77106

Covão Grande is a settlement in the central part of the island of Santiago, Cape Verde. It is part of the municipality São Salvador do Mundo. In 2010 its population was 478. It is situated 2 km northwest of Picos and 2.5 km east of Assomada.
