= Monte das Vacas =

Mountain in Cape Verde

- Location within Cape Verde

Highest point
- Elevation: 437 m (1,434 ft)
- Listing: List of mountains in Cape Verde
- Coordinates: 14°59′20″N 23°31′44″W

Geography
- Location: southern Santiago

Geology
- Rock type(s): basalt, basanite

Monte das Vacas is a mountain located in the southeastern part of the island of Santiago, Cape Verde. It is 2 km south of Ribeirão Chiqueiro and 8 km of the city centre of the capital Praia. Its elevation is 437 meters. It is of volcanic origin and was formed between 1.1 and 0.7 million years ago.

== See also ==
- List of mountains in Cape Verde
