= Milho Branco =

- Settlement
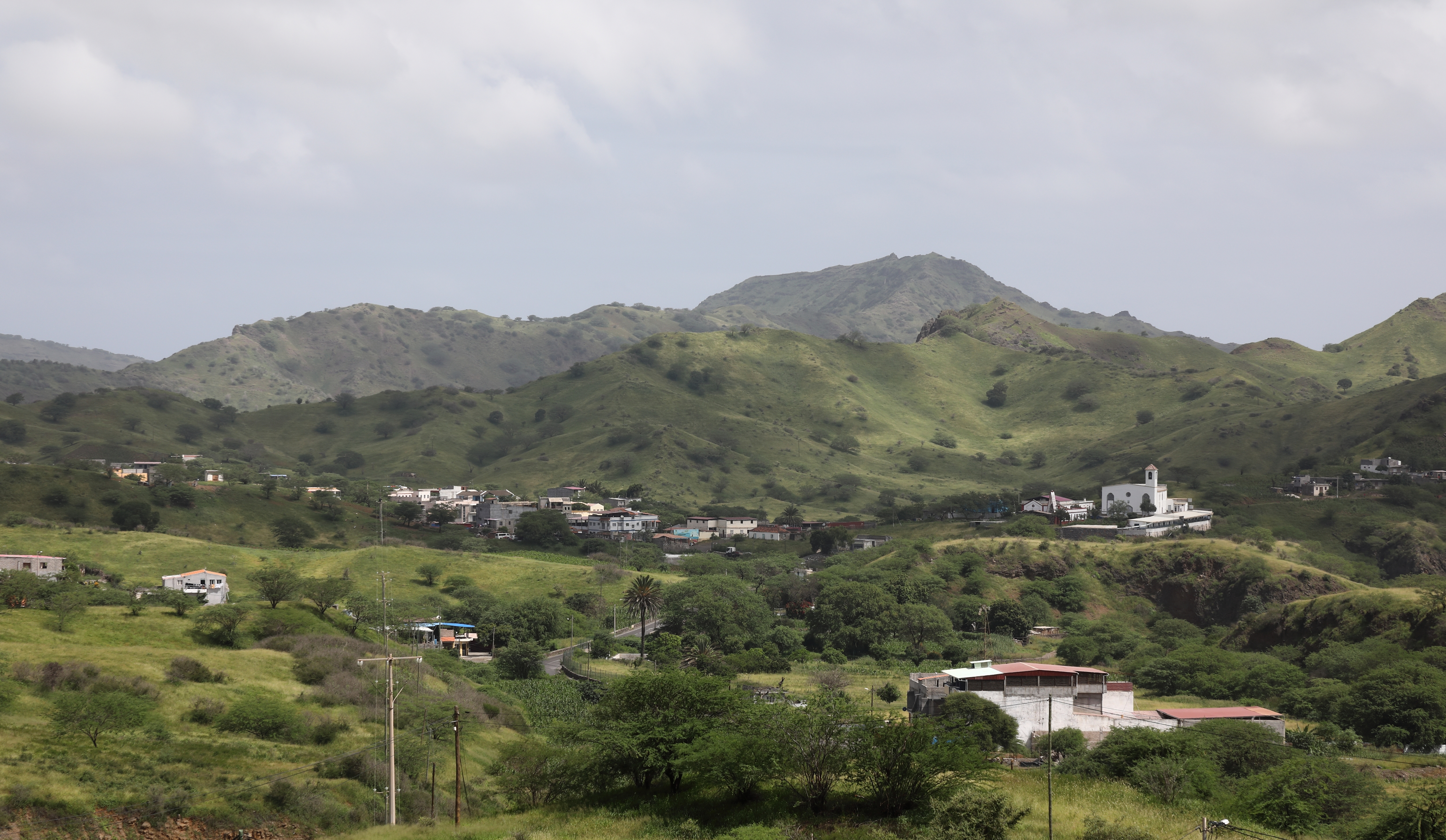

- Location within Cape Verde
- Coordinates: 15.0258°N 23.5208°W
- Country: Cape Verde
- Island: Santiago
- Municipality: São Domingos
- Civil parish: Nossa Senhora da Luz

Population (2010)
  - Total: 607
- ID: 75106

Milho Branco is a village in the southeastern part of the island of Santiago, Cape Verde. It is situated 2 km north of Ribeirão Chiqueiro, 5 km east of the city São Domingos and 12 km north of the capital Praia. The national road EN1-ST02 from Ribeirão Chiqueiro to Tarrafal via Pedra Badejo passes through the village. It is part of the municipality of São Domingos. In 2010 its population was 607.

== Localities ==
- Cabeça Horta
- Chã Cardoso
- Chanzinha
- Milho Branco
- Sezimbra
- Terra Branca
