= Monte Tchota =

Mountain in Cape Verde

- Location within Cape Verde

Highest point
- Elevation: 1,041 m (3,415 ft)
- Listing: List of mountains in Cape Verde
- Coordinates: 15°02′16″N 23°37′33″W

Geography
- Location: central Santiago

Monte Tchota (also: Monte Txota) is a mountain located in the central part of Santiago Island in Cape Verde. Its elevation is 1,041 m. It is part of the Serra do Pico de Antónia Natural Park, and lies 1.5 km southeast of Pico de Antónia, the highest point of the island. The village Rui Vaz lies 3 km to the east.

== See also ==
- List of mountains in Cape Verde
