= Achada Leitão =

- Settlement
- Coordinates: 15.094°N 23.620°W
- Country: Cape Verde
- Island: Santiago
- Municipality: São Salvador do Mundo
- Civil parish: São Salvador do Mundo

Population (2010)
  - Total: 1,160
- ID: 77103

Achada Leitão is a settlement in the central part of the island of Santiago, Cape Verde. It is part of the municipality São Salvador do Mundo. It is situated 3 km northeast of Picos.
