= Belém, Santiago =

Belém
- Settlement
- Coordinates: 14.9977°N 23.656°W
- Country: Cape Verde
- Island: Santiago
- Municipality: Ribeira Grande de Santiago
- Civil parish: São João Baptista

Population (2010)
  - Total: 382
- ID: 79202

Belém (Portuguese for Bethlehem) is a settlement in the southwest of the island of Santiago, Cape Verde. It is part of the municipality of Ribeira Grande de Santiago. It is 2 km west of Santana, 6 km north of Porto Gouveia and 11 km northwest of the municipal seat Cidade Velha. In 2010 its population was 382.
