= Achada Grande =

Achada Grande may refer to:

- Achada Grande, Mosteiros, a village on the island of Fogo, Cape Verde
- Achada Grande Frente, a neighborhood of Praia, Santiago, Cape Verde
- Achada Grande Tras, a neighborhood of Praia, Santiago, Cape Verde
- Achada Grande, the former name of Achada, a civil parish in Nordeste, São Miguel, Azores
- Achada Grande, a village in São Jorge, Santana, Madeira Islands

== See also ==
- Achada (disambiguation)
