= Principal, Cape Verde =

Principal
- Settlement
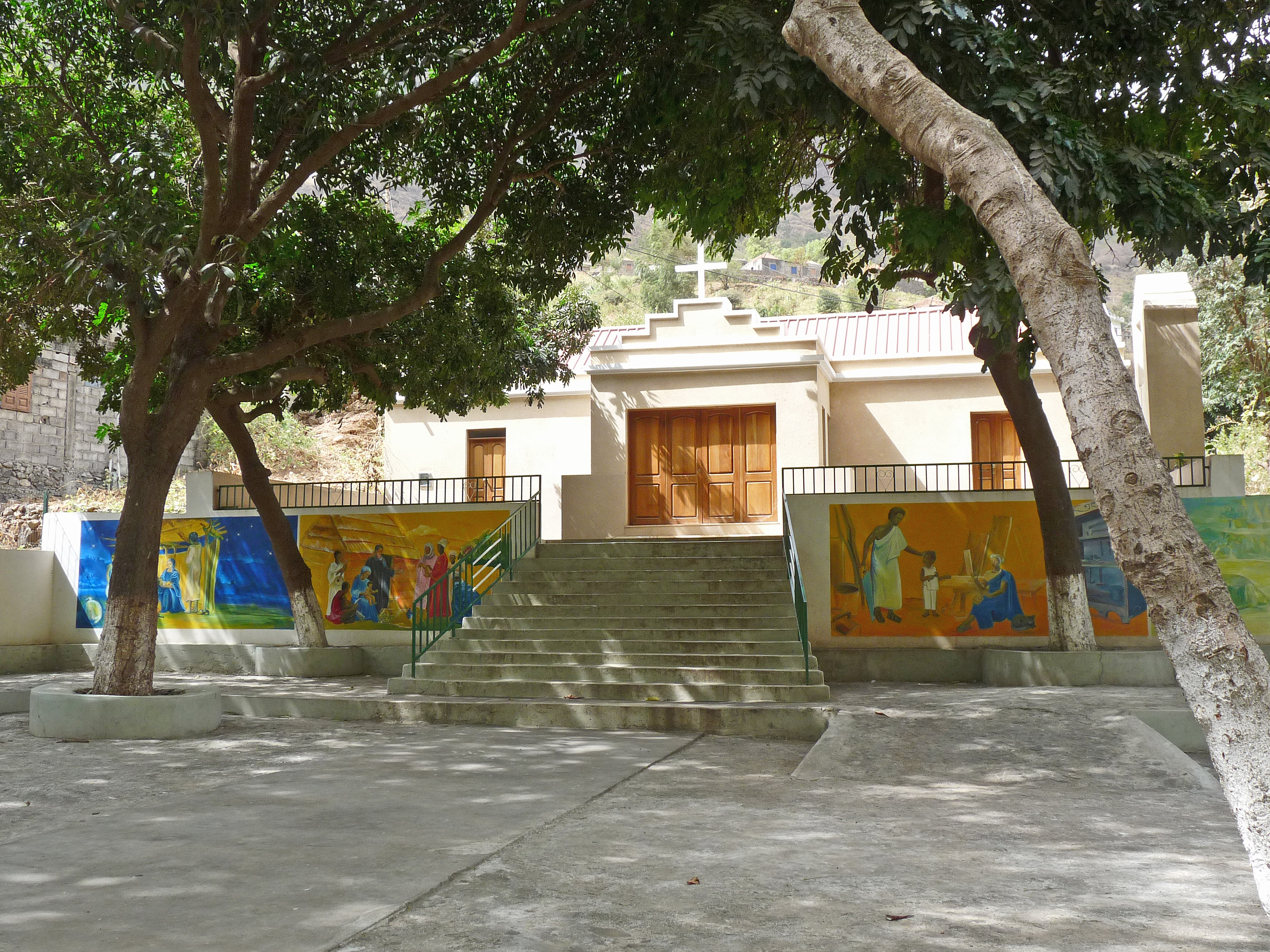
- Village church

- Location within Cape Verde
- Coordinates: 15.212°N 23.659°W
- Country: Cape Verde
- Island: Santiago
- Municipality: São Miguel
- Civil parish: São Miguel Arcanjo

Population (2010)
  - Total: 1,193
- ID: 76118

Principal is a settlement in the northern part of the island of Santiago, Cape Verde. It is part of the municipality of São Miguel. The settlement consists of several localities along the river Ribeira Principal, including Chão de Horta, Hortelão, Jaqueitão and Mato Curral. In 2010 its population was 1,193. Hortelão is 4 km north of the summit of the Serra Malagueta and 7 km northwest of Calheta de São Miguel.
