= Ribeira Principal =

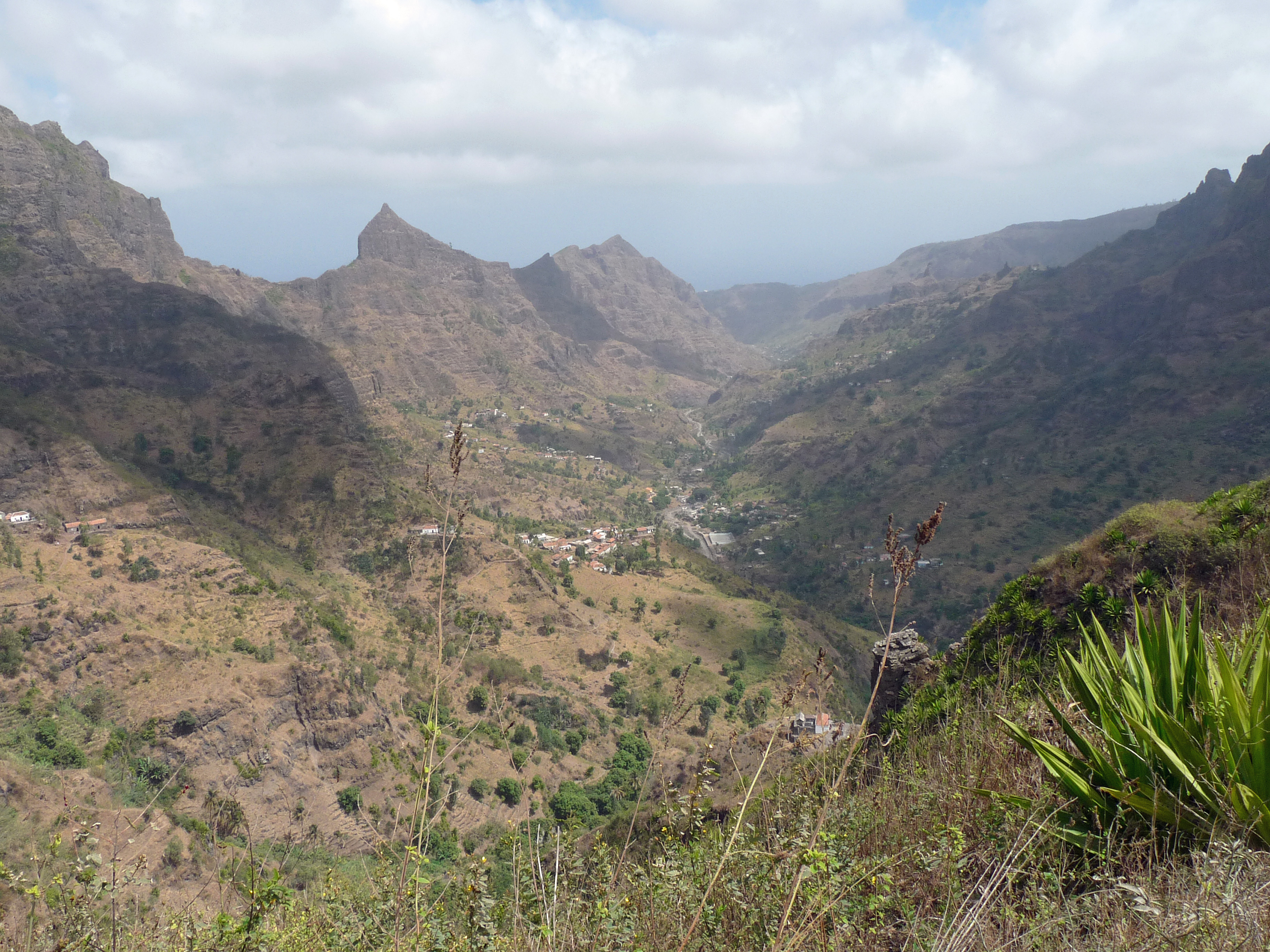
- The valley of Ribeira Principal

Location
- Country: Cape Verde

Physical characteristics
- Source
  - location: Serra Malagueta; Santiago Island, Cape Verde
  - elevation: 900 m (3,000 ft)
- Mouth
  - location: Atlantic Ocean near Achada Monte
  - coordinates: 15°14′49″N 23°39′22″W
- Length: 8 km (5.0 mi)

Ribeira Principal is a stream in the northern part of the island of Santiago, Cape Verde. It flows completely within the municipality of São Miguel. Its source is in the Serra Malagueta mountains. It flows generally north, through the valley of Principal, and joins the Atlantic Ocean near Achada Monte.

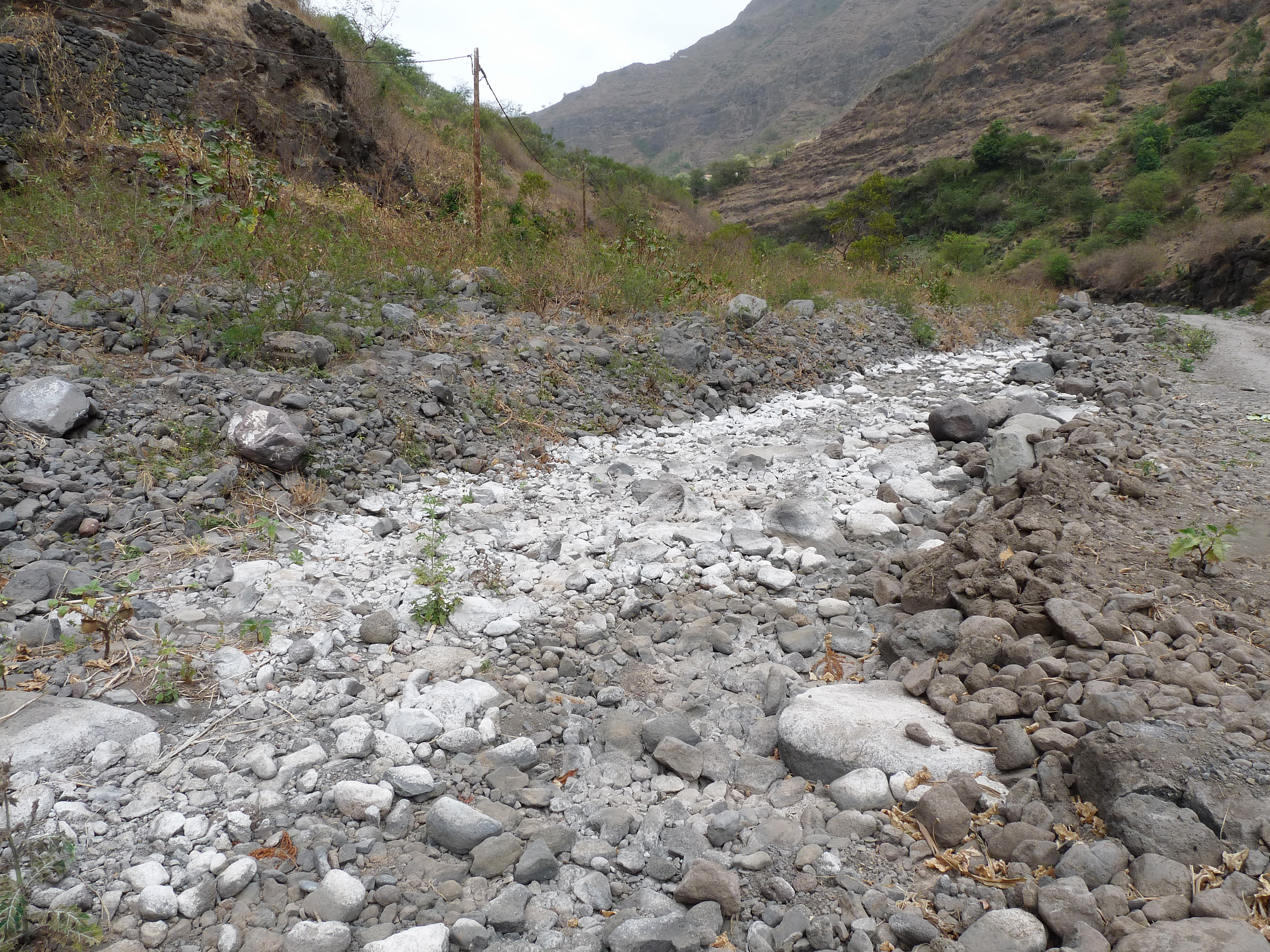
The middle of Ribeira Principal

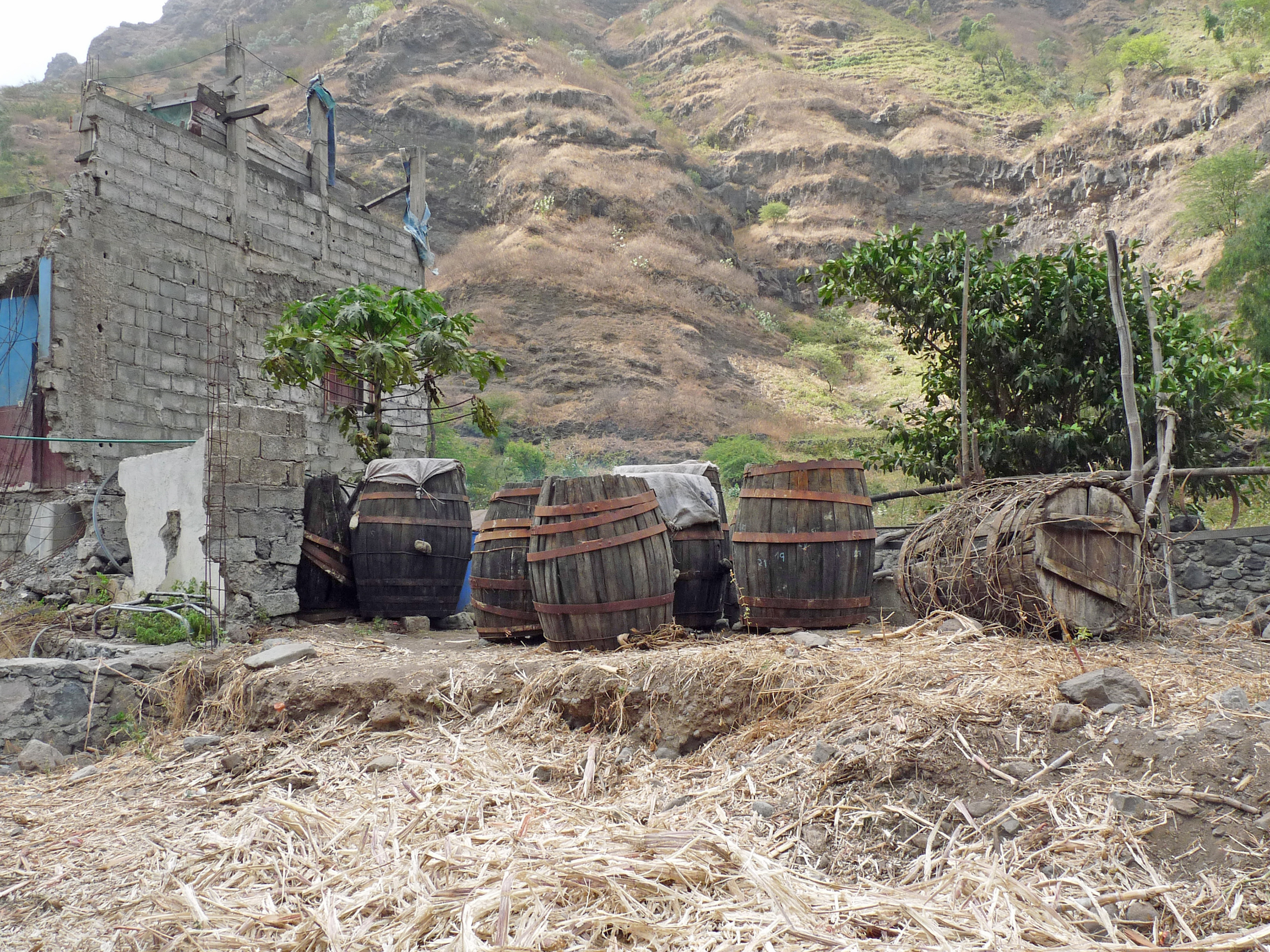
A distillery for making grogue, Ribeira Principal being a notable grogue producing area

== See also ==
- List of streams in Cape Verde
