= Pico de Antónia =

Mountain in Cape Verde

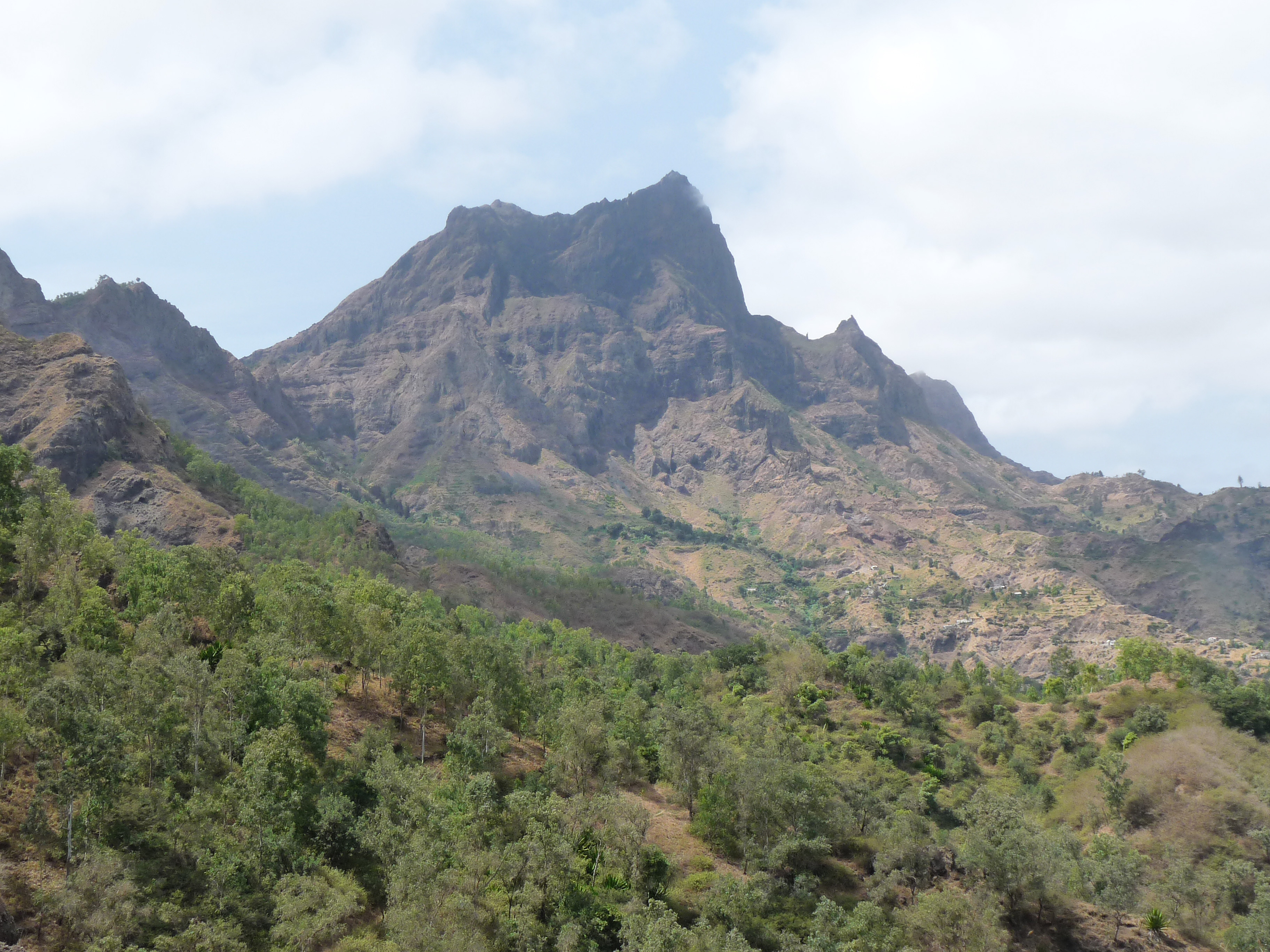
- View over Pico da Antónia

Highest point
- Elevation: 1,394 m (4,573 ft)
- Prominence: 1,394 m (4,573 ft)
- Listing: List of mountains in Cape Verde; Ribu
- Coordinates: 15°03′4″N 23°38′7″W

Geography
- Location within Cape Verde
- Location: central Santiago

Pico de Antónia is a mountain located in the central part of the island of Santiago in Cape Verde. At 1,394 m (4,573 ft), it is the highest point of the island. The mountain is part of the protected area Parque Natural da Serra do Pico de Antónia. The towns Picos and Assomada lie close to the mountain. The Serra do Pico da Antónia has been identified by BirdLife International as an Important Bird Area.

The mountain is at the tripoint of the municipalities of São Salvador do Mundo, São Lourenço dos Órgãos and Ribeira Grande de Santiago. North of the summit is the source of the Ribeira de Pico da Antónia, a source river of the Ribeira Seca.

The Pico da Antónia formation is of volcanic origin, and was formed between 3.3 and 2.3 million years ago during the Piacenzian and the Gelasian periods.
