= Porto Mosquito =

- Settlement
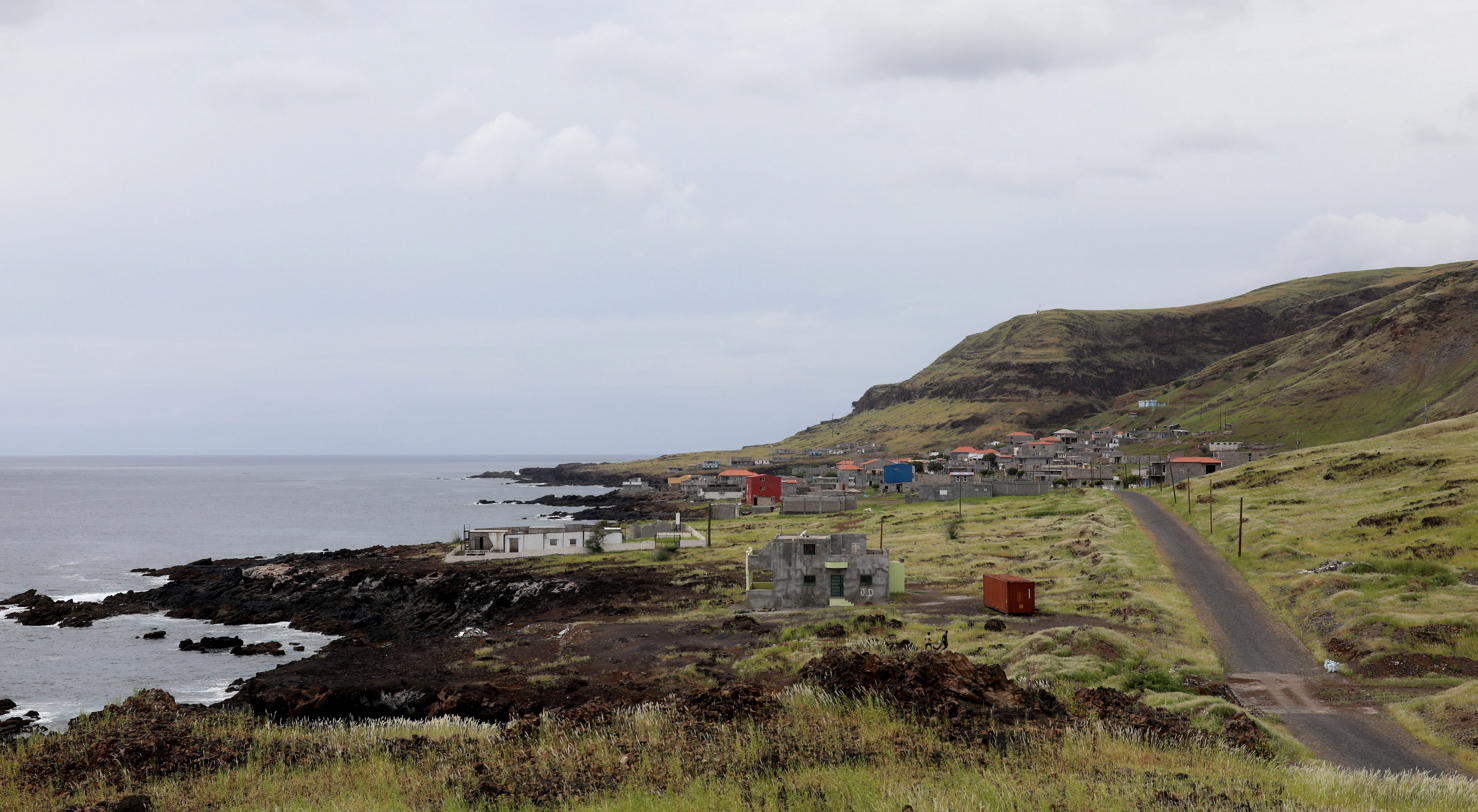

- Location within Cape Verde
- Coordinates: 14.952°N 23.686°W
- Country: Cape Verde
- Island: Santiago
- Municipality: Ribeira Grande de Santiago
- Civil parish: São João Baptista

Population (2010)
  - Total: 819
- ID: 79211

Porto Mosquito is a settlement in the southern part of the island of Santiago, Cape Verde. It is situated on the south coast, 10 km northwest of Cidade Velha. It is part of the municipality of Ribeira Grande de Santiago.
