= São João Baptista (Ribeira Grande de Santiago) =

- Civil parish
- Coordinates: 14.99°N 23.66°W
- Country: Cape Verde
- Island: Santiago
- Municipality: Ribeira Grande de Santiago

Population (2010)
  - Total: 4,469
- ID: 792

São João Baptista is a freguesia (civil parish) of Cape Verde. It covers the western part of the municipality of Ribeira Grande de Santiago, on the island of Santiago.

== Subdivisions ==
The freguesia consists of the following settlements (population at the 2010 census):

- Achada Loura (pop: 403)
- Alfaroba (pop: 67)
- Beatriz Pereira (pop: 66)
- Belém (pop: 382)
- Chã de Igreja (pop: 210)
- Chã Gonçalves (pop: 169)
- Mosquito d'Horta (pop: 118)
- Pico Leão (pop: 572)
- Porto Gouveia (pop: 534)
- Porto Mosquito (pop: 819)
- Santa Clara (pop: 5)
- Santana (pop: 957)
- Tronco (pop: 166)
