= Chão Bom =

- Settlement
- Coordinates: 15.257°N 23.740°W
- Country: Cape Verde
- Island: Santiago
- Municipality: Tarrafal
- Civil parish: Santo Amaro Abade
- Elevation: 12 m (39 ft)

Population (2010)
  - Total: 5,166
- ID: 71108

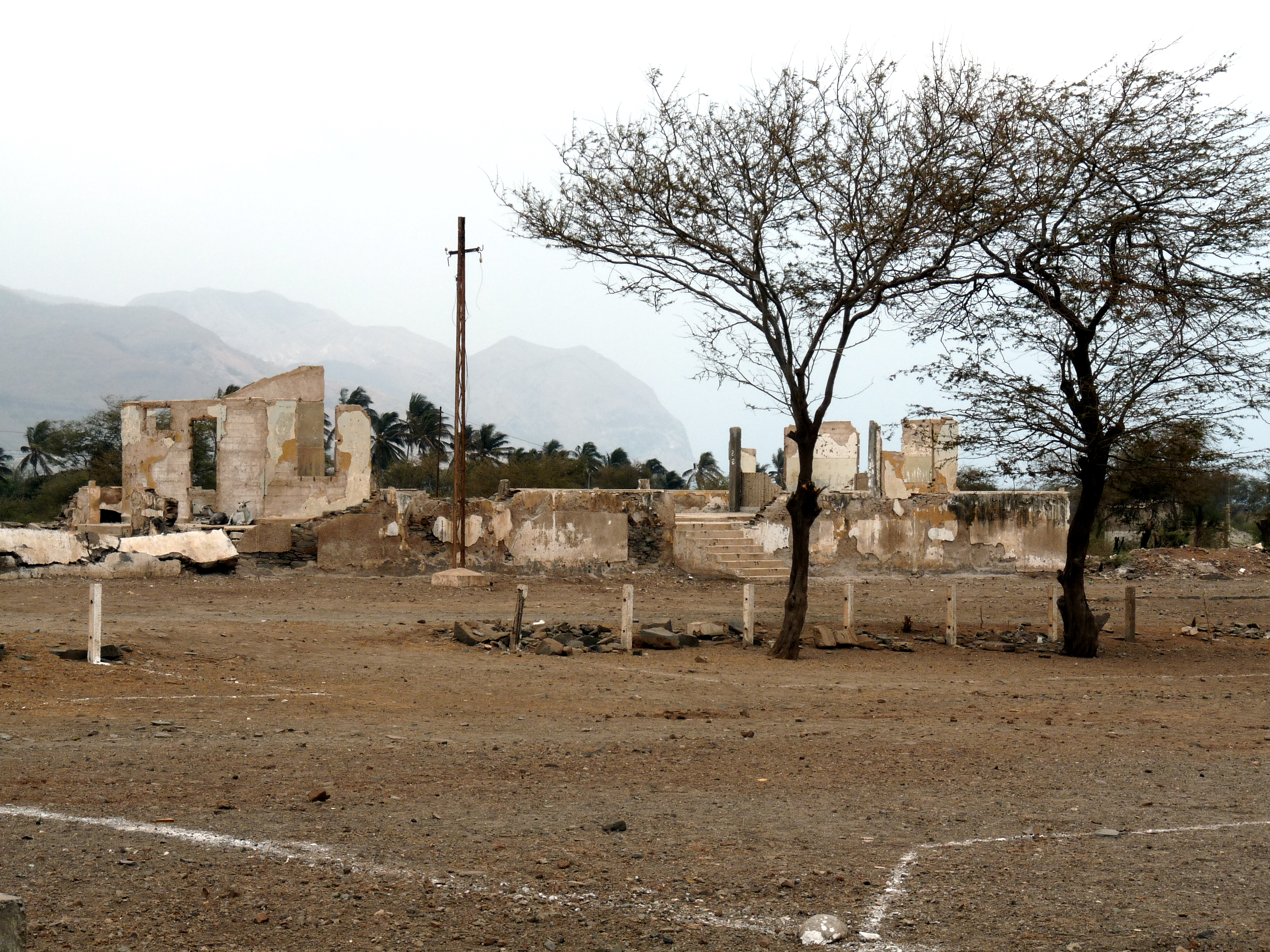
The old concentration camp

Chão Bom is a settlement in the northern part of the island of Santiago, Cape Verde. It is situated near the west coast, 3 km southeast of Tarrafal on the main road (EN1-ST01) south to Assomada and Praia. In 2010 its population was 5,166. The Tarrafal prison camp was situated north of Chão Bom. The stadium Estádio de Mangue is in the northwestern part in the communal limits. Silvino Lopes Évora, a writer, poet, journalist and a university professor is native to Chão Bom.
