= Serra do Pico de Antónia =

Mountain range

Serra do Pico de Antónia Natural Park
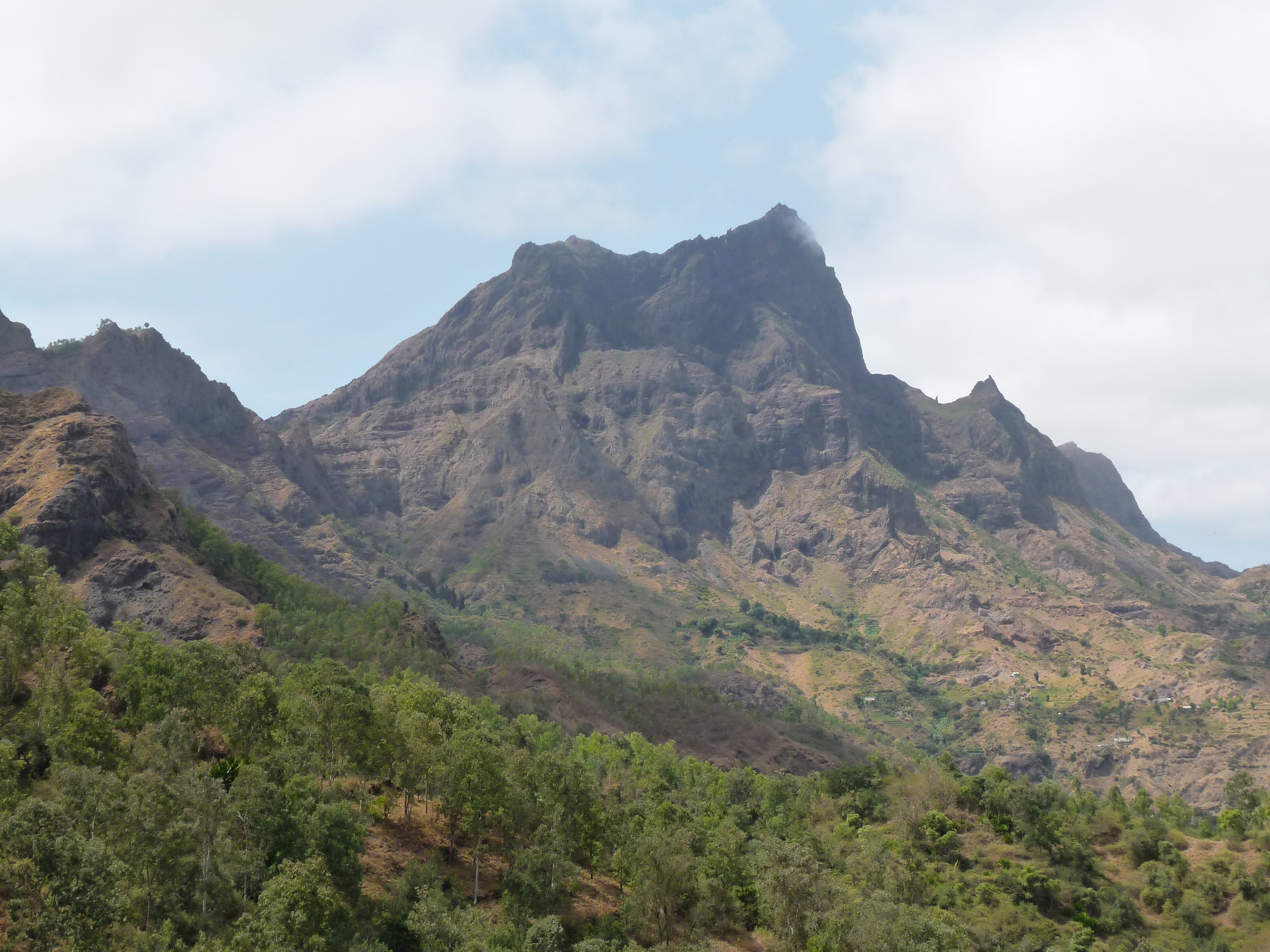
- Pico de Antónia
- Interactive map of Serra do Pico de Antónia Natural Park
- Location: Santiago, Cape Verde
- Coordinates: 15°03′N 23°38′W
- Area: 28.73 km^{2} (11.09 sq mi)

The Serra do Pico de Antónia is a mountain range in the centre of the island of Santiago in the Cape Verde archipelago. It contains the Pico de Antónia, at 1,392 m (4,567 ft) the highest point of the island. It is protected as a natural park, covering 28.73 km^{2} (11.09 sq mi). The natural park covers the connected mountain ranges of Serra do Pico de Antónia and of Rui Vaz (Monte Tchota).

== Flora and fauna ==
Much of the slopes and crest of the range is planted with eucalypts and other trees which are managed by the state forestry service. The higher parts of the range are often shrouded in clouds and precipitation is relatively high. Some coffee is cultivated on the higher slopes, while beans and maize are grown at lower altitudes. Accessibility is limited, though there are some roads, as well as a track leading to the summit.

The site was identified as an Important Bird Area (IBA) by BirdLife International because it supports populations of peregrine falcons, red kites, long-legged buzzards, Alexander's swifts, Cape Verde warblers and Iago sparrows. The endemic lizards Mabuya stangeri spinalis Tarentola darwini, Tarentola rudis and Hemidactylus brooki angulatus are present. Endemic plants include Euphorbia tuckeyana, Campanula jacobaea and Sonchus daltonii.
