= EN1-SL01 =

Coordinates: 16.6855°N 22.9357°W

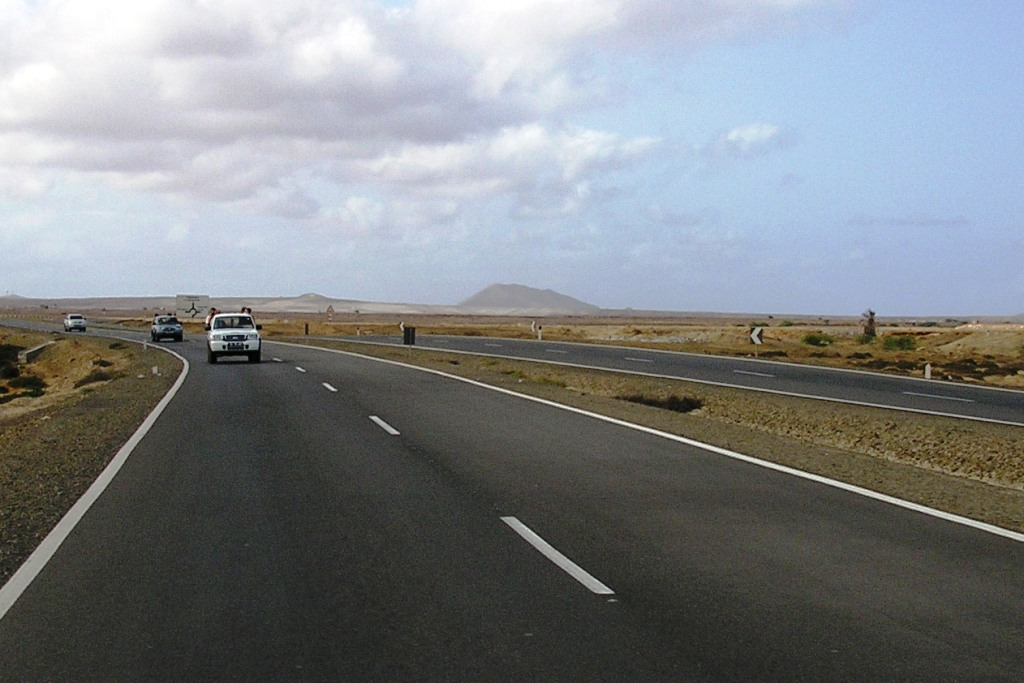
- The road at the middle of the island

Route information
- Length: 18 km (11 mi)

Major junctions
- North end: Espargos
- South end: Santa Maria

Location
- Country: Cabo Verde
- Regions: Sal

Highway system
- Roads in Cabo Verde

EN1-SL01 is a first class national road on the island of Sal, Cape Verde. It runs from Espargos to Santa Maria. It is Sal's only dual carriageway. In Espargos it is connected with EN1-SL-02 to Palmeira and EN3-SL-02 to Pedra de Lume. In Santa Maria it is connected with EN3-SL-01 to Ponta do Sinó.

== See also ==
- Transport in Cape Verde
- Roads in Cape Verde
