= Limonium lobinii =

Conservation status
- Critically Endangered (IUCN 3.1)

Scientific classification
- Kingdom: Plantae
- Clade: Tracheophytes
- Clade: Angiosperms
- Clade: Eudicots
- Order: Caryophyllales
- Family: Plumbaginaceae
- Genus: Limonium
- Species: L. lobinii

Binomial name
- Limonium lobinii N. Kilian & Leyens, 1994

Species of flowering plant

Limonium lobinii is a species of flowering plants of the family Plumbaginaceae. The species is endemic to Cape Verde. It is listed as an endangered species by the IUCN. The species was first described by Norbert Kilian and Teresa Leyens in 1994. Its local name is carqueja-de-Santiago.

== Distribution and ecology ==
Limonium braunii is restricted to Serra Malagueta in the island of Santiago.
