= São Martinho Grande =

- Settlement
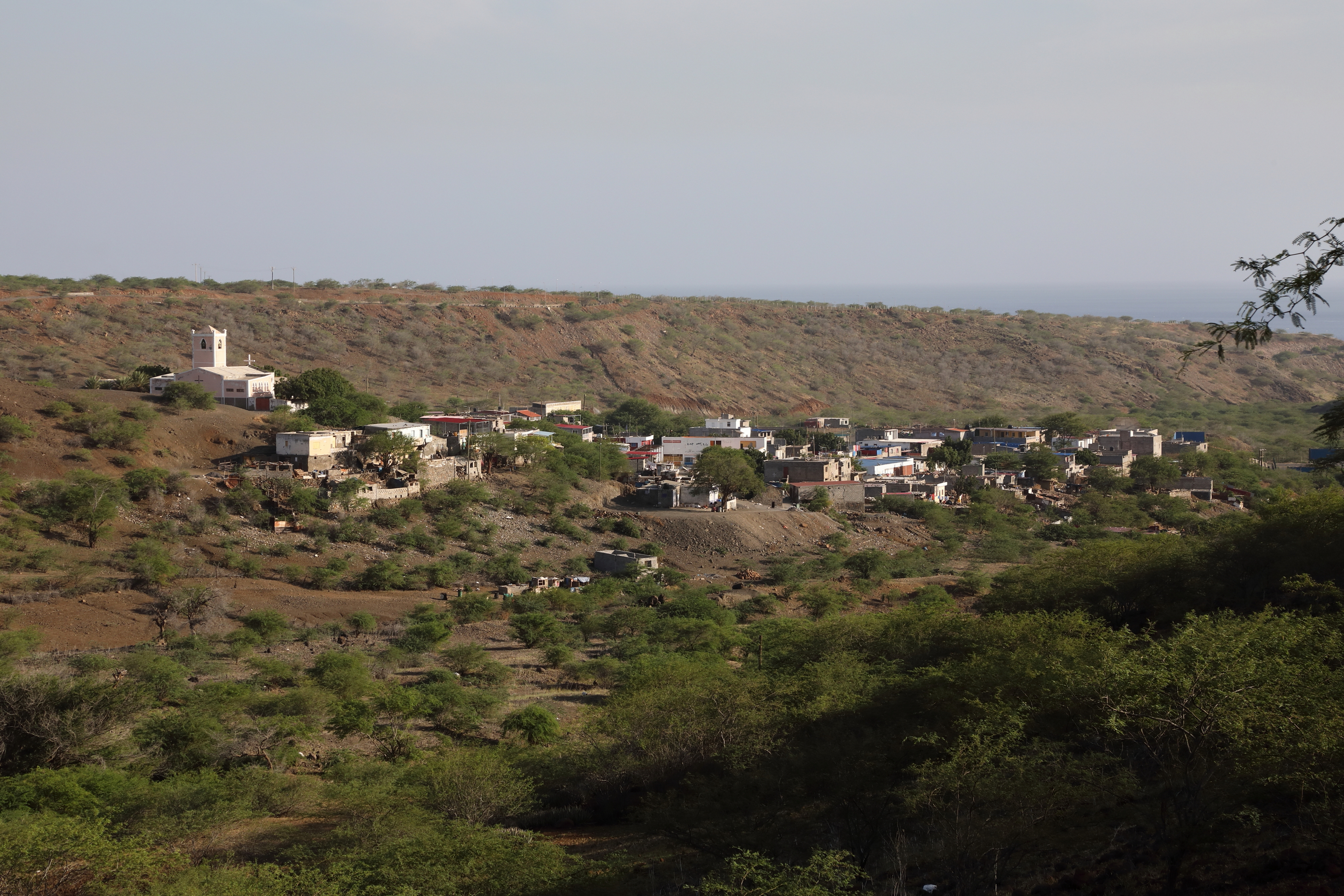

- Location within Cape Verde
- Coordinates: 14.9232°N 23.5686°W
- Country: Cape Verde
- Island: Santiago
- Municipality: Ribeira Grande de Santiago
- Civil parish: Santíssimo Nome de Jesus

Population (2010)
  - Total: 593
- ID: 79108

São Martinho Grande is a settlement in the southern part of the island of Santiago, Cape Verde, and part of the municipality Ribeira Grande de Santiago. It is 4 km east from Cidade Velha and 6.5 km west of Praia city centre. National road EN1-ST05 (Praia - Cidade Velha) passes north of it. 1.5 km to its south is Calheta de São Martinho, a small bay of the Atlantic Ocean. It was mentioned as "Kalyete de S. Martin" on the 1747 map by Jacques-Nicolas Bellin.
