= Santana, Cape Verde =

Santana
- Settlement
- Coordinates: 14.991°N 23.639°W
- Country: Cape Verde
- Island: Santiago
- Municipality: Ribeira Grande de Santiago
- Civil parish: São João Baptista

Population (2010)
  - Total: 957
- ID: 79212

Santana is a settlement in the southern part of the island of Santiago, Cape Verde. It is part of the municipality of Ribeira Grande de Santiago. It is situated 2 km east of Belém and 9 km northwest of Cidade Velha.
