= Estádio de Mangue =

Sports stadium in Tarrafal, Cape Verde

- Location within Cape Verde
- Location: Assomada-Tarrafal Road; Tarrafal, Santiago, Cape Verde
- Coordinates: 15.2674°N 23.7454°W
- Capacity: 200

Construction
- Opened: 2008

Tenants
- Amabox Barcelona (former); Beira-Mar; AEF Chão Bom; Delta Cultura; Estrela dos Amadores; Juventus de Tarrafal; Varandinha

Estádio de Mangue or Estádio Municipal do Tarrafal is a multi-purpose stadium in the neighborhood of Mangue in Tarrafal, Cape Verde nearly 100 meters north of the communal boundary of Chão Bom and just west of the Assomada-Tarrafal Road (EN1-ST01). It is currently used mostly for football matches. The stadium holds 200 people and its dimensions is 105 x 67 meters. It is one of four that are operated by the Santiago North Regional Football Association (ARFSN). The stadium is home to Tarrafal's best clubs including Amabox Barcelona (absent from competition since 2014), Beira-Mar, Estrela dos Amadores and Varandinha. All clubs participate in the Santiago Island League North Zone. Other teams that base in another part include AEF Chão Bom (also known as Txon Bon). Since 2015, it is also the home field of Delta Cultura currently playing in the regional Second Division. Tarrafal's Health Center is east of the stadium.

The stadium is also used as a training ground before its matches.

== History ==
The football (soccer) field was created in around the 1970s and was a dirt field up to the 1990s, it became a grass field. Construction of the stadium's seats began in 2007 and was finished by about 2009 and costed about 100 million escudos (about US$1.2 million and €907,000, 2009 value) .

In 1999, football clubs from Tarrafal and Calheta de São Miguel played in that stadium. When Estádio da Calheta was constructed in 2008, all of its clubs plays at that stadium.

The stadium was used for the Cape Verdean Football Championships in 2000 and 2003 with Barcelona, 2004, 2009 and 2012 with Estrela dos Amadores, 2015 with Beira Mar and recently 2016 with Varandinha. In 2016, after Varandinha's victory over Grémio Nhagar on May 8 with a record 63 points, it was the stadium where Varandinha was crowned regional champion of the North Zone.

In 2014, a construction of a basketball/volleyball arena north of the stadium began and was completed in late 2015.

In May 2016, a championship declaration dispute arose between Scorpion Vermelho and Varandinha as in a match as on an April 3 match (19th round) featuring Desportivo Santa Cruz and Scorpion Vermelho that Desportivo fielded an ineligible player, it occurred after the goals were scored and the award to Scorpion Vermelho in mid-May was revoked just before the start of the national season and the 2-0 result was kept and the venue was included in the national championships for the season. As a result, the first round match featuring Desportivo Praia Varandinha and Derby was rescheduled from May 13 to June 1.

Estádio de Mangue was the only venue in the Santiago North Zone to present the Cape Verdean Football's Knockout Stage on June 18, 2016, the first to two semifinal matches between Varandinha and Mindelense was in the stadium. Varandinha lost the match to Mindelense 1–4.

Since 2016, the GAFT Cup is a municipal competition featuring the clubs from the municipality. Varandinha won their first title.

Recently, as the club Amabox Barcelona has been dissolved and eliminated, it is no longer its home stadium.

== Panoramics ==
The stadium can be viewed from the surrounding area including Chão Bom and Monte Graciosa.

== See also ==
- List of football stadiums in Cape Verde
- List of buildings and structures in Santiago, Cape Verde
- Sports in Santiago, Cape Verde
