= Porto Gouveia =

- Settlement
- Coordinates: 14.940°N 23.665°W
- Country: Cape Verde
- Island: Santiago
- Municipality: Ribeira Grande de Santiago
- Civil parish: São João Baptista

Population (2010)
  - Total: 534
- ID: 79206

Porto Gouveia is a settlement in the southern part of the island of Santiago, Cape Verde. It is situated on the south coast, 7 km northwest of Cidade Velha. It is part of the municipality of Ribeira Grande de Santiago.
