= São Salvador do Mundo, Cape Verde =

Municipality of Cape Verde

São Salvador do Mundo
- Municipality
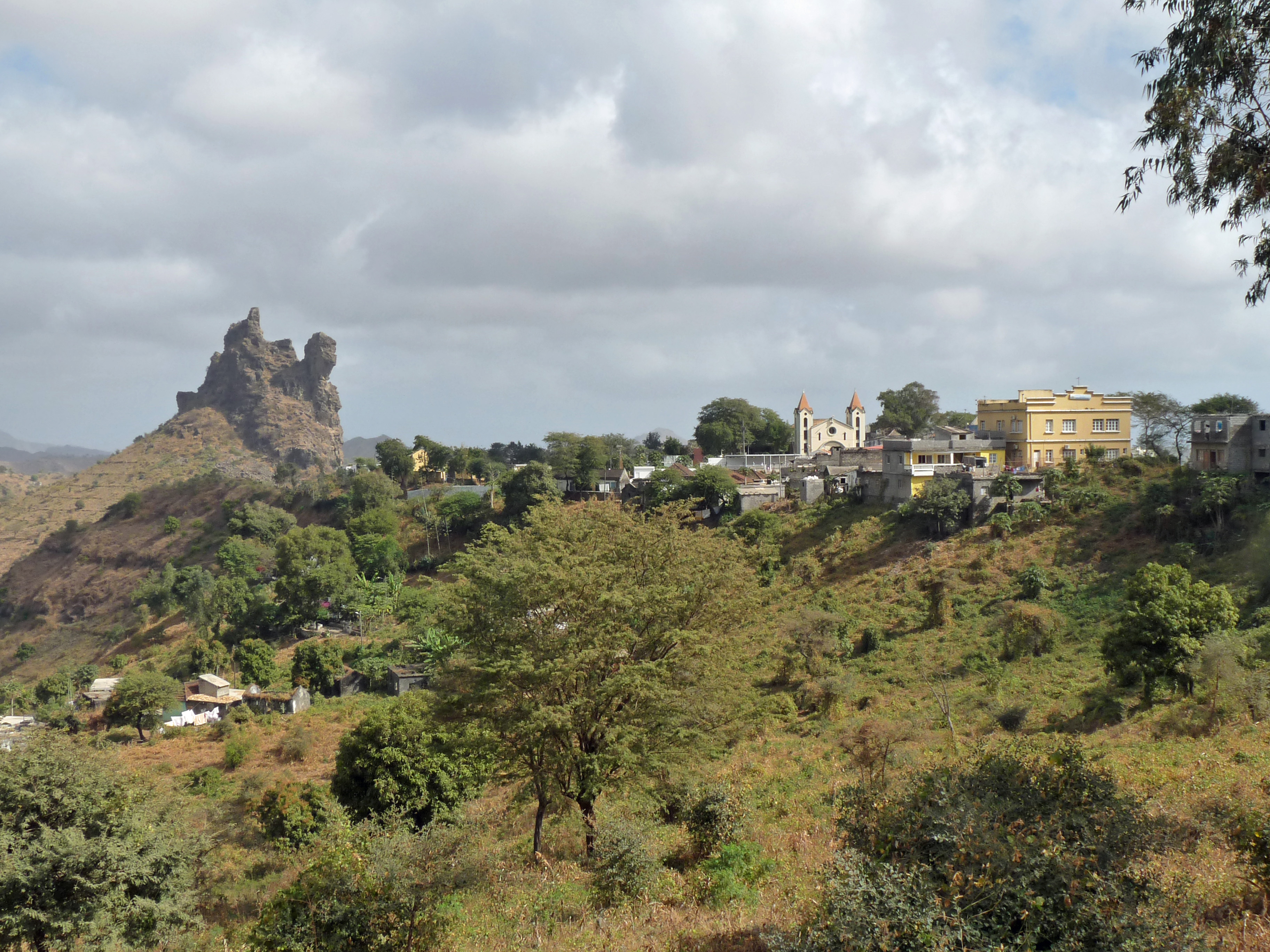

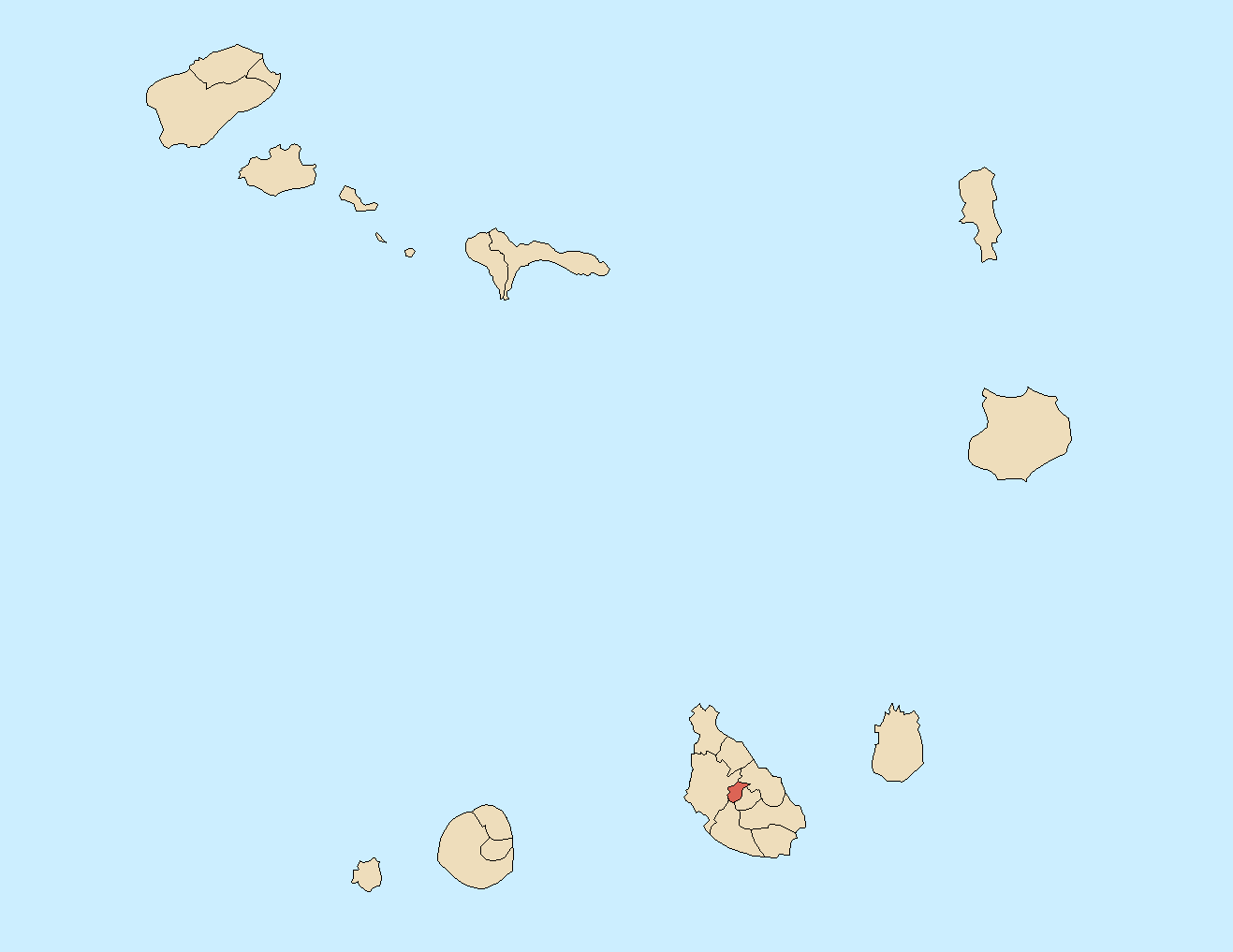
- Coordinates: 15.07°N 23.63°W
- Country: Cape Verde
- Island: Santiago

Area
  - Total: 26.5 km^{2} (10.2 sq mi)

Population (2010)
  - Total: 8,677
  - Density: 327/km^{2} (848/sq mi)
- ID: 77

São Salvador do Mundo is a concelho (municipality) of Cape Verde. It is situated in the central part of the island of Santiago. Its seat is the city Picos. Its population was 8,677 at the 2010 census, and its area is 26.5 km^{2}, making it the smallest municipality of Cape Verde. The municipality borders Santa Cruz to the northeast, São Lourenço dos Órgãos to the southeast, Ribeira Grande de Santiago to the southwest and Santa Catarina to the northwest.

== Subdivisions ==
The municipality consists of one freguesia (civil parish), São Salvador do Mundo. The freguesia is subdivided into the following settlements (population data from the 2010 census):

- Aboboreiro (pop: 532)
- Achada Leitão (pop: 1,160)
- Babosa (pop: 183)
- Burbur (pop: 131)
- Covão Grande (pop: 478)
- Degredo (pop: 148)
- Djéu (pop: 90)
- Faveta (pop: 247)
- Jalalo Ramos (pop: 239)
- Junco (pop: 266)
- Leitão Grande (pop: 927)
- Leitãozinho (pop: 460)
- Manhanga (pop: 177)
- Mato Fortes (pop: 179)
- Mato Limão (pop: 134)
- Pico Freire (pop: 546)
- Picos (also: Achada Igreja, pop: 986, city)
- Picos Acima (pop: 1,489)
- Purgueira (pop: 217)
- Rebelo Acima (pop: 54)

== History ==
It was created in 2005, when a parish of the older Municipality of Santa Catarina was separated to become the Municipality of São Salvador do Mundo.

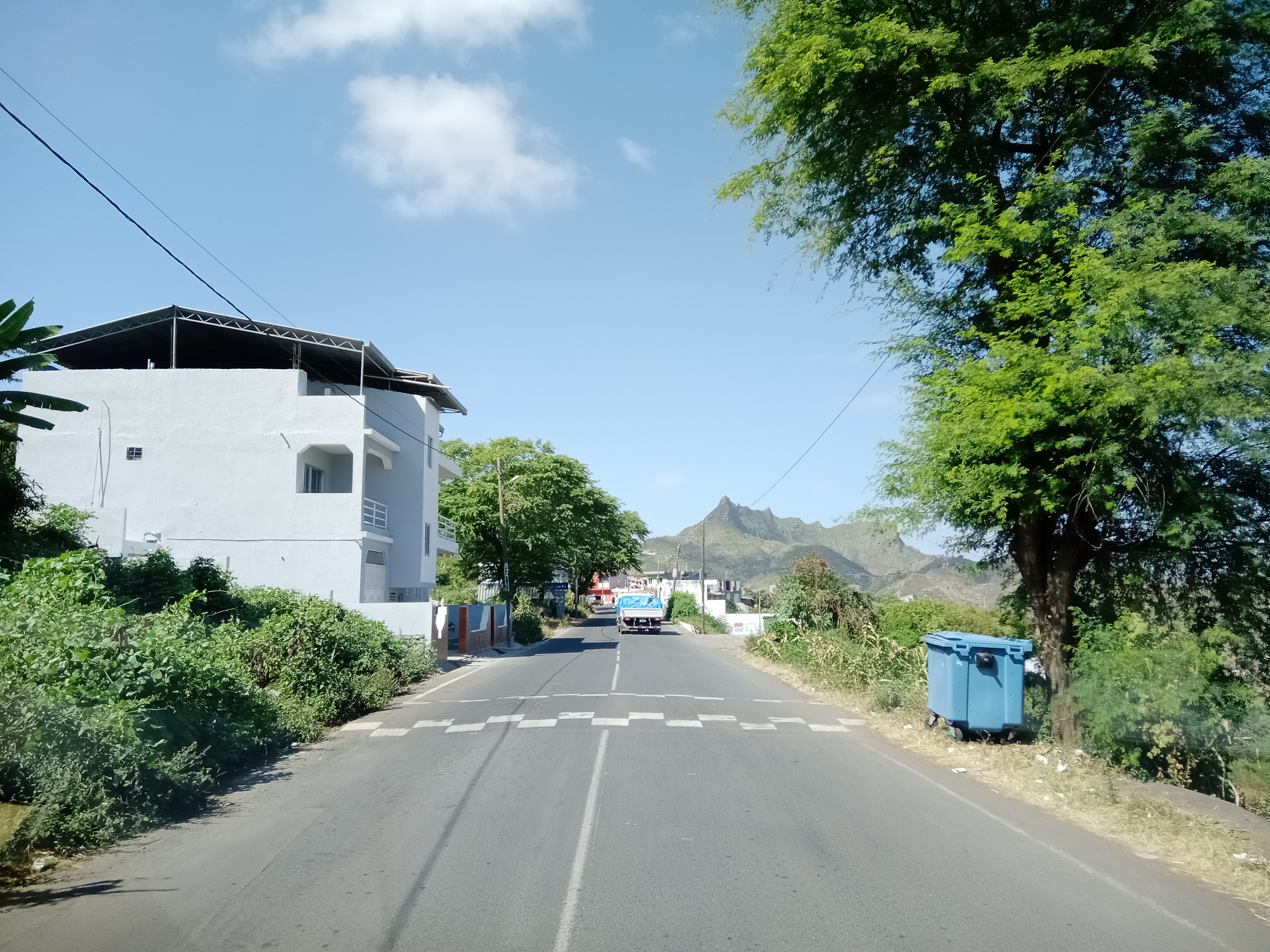
National road Picos-Assomada

== Demography ==
Population of São Salvador do Mundo (1980—2010)
| Year | Population |
|---|---|
| 1980 | 8,315 |
| 1990 | 9,130 |
| 2000 | 9,172 |
| 2010 | 8,677 |

== Politics ==
At the federal level, it belongs to the constituency of Santiago North. Since 2016, the Movement for Democracy (MpD) is the ruling party of the municipality. The results of the latest elections, in 2016:

| Party | Municipal Council | | Municipal Assembly | |
| Party | Votes% | Seats | Votes% | Seats |
|---|---|---|---|---|
| MpD | 51.94 | 5 | 52.41 | 7 |
| PAICV | 45.14 | 0 | 44.85 | 6 |
