= EN1-ST05 =

Road in Cape Verde

Coordinates: 14.9262°N 23.5607°W

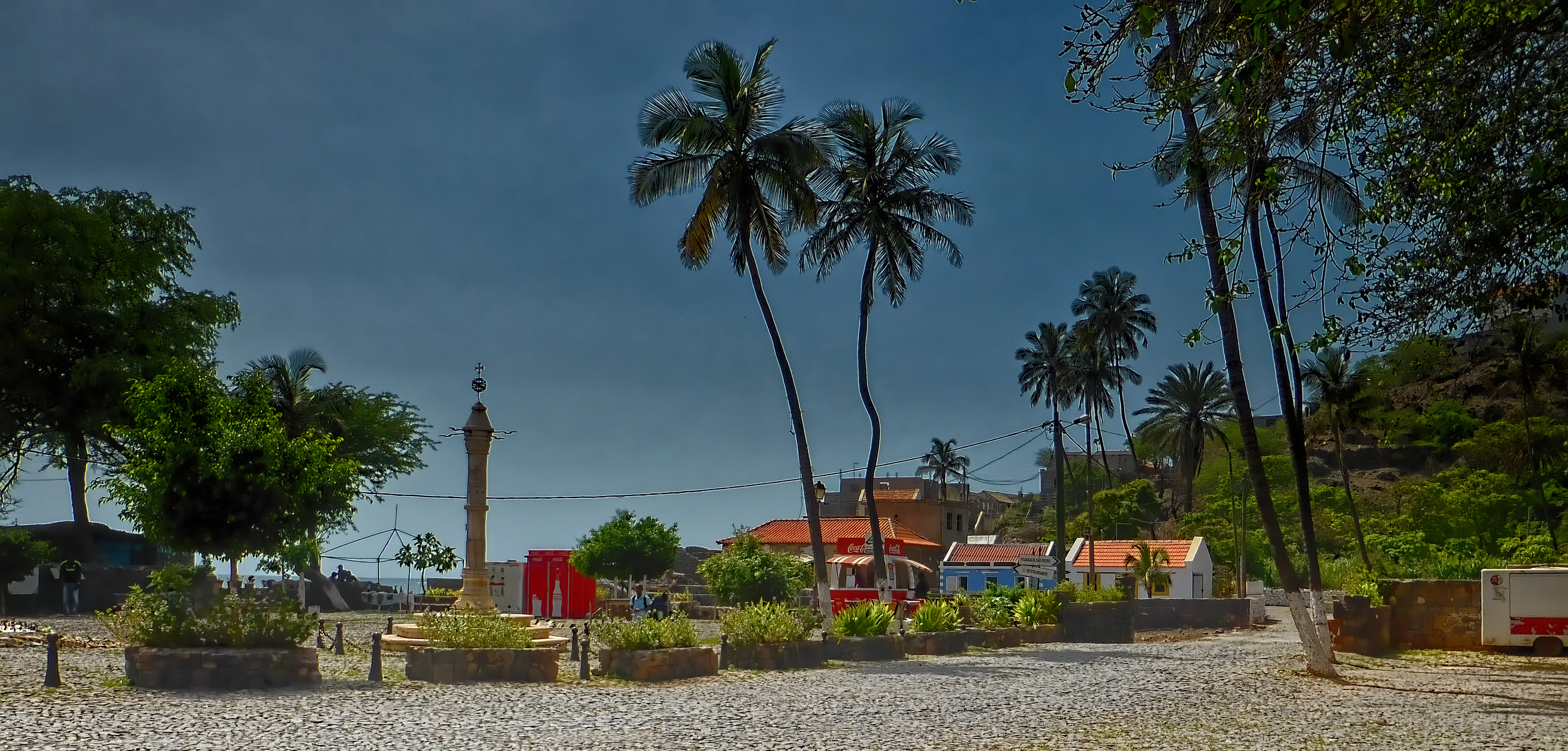
- The Pelourinho in Cidade Velha

Route information
- Length: 7 km (4.3 mi)

Major junctions
- East end: West Praia
- West end: Cidade Velha

Location
- Country: Cabo Verde
- Regions: Santiago
- Major cities: Cidade Velha

Highway system
- Roads in Cabo Verde

EN1-ST05 is a first class national road on the island of Santiago, Cape Verde. It runs from the western outskirts of the capital Praia to Cidade Velha. It is 7 km long. In Praia it is connected with the Circular da Praia (EN1-ST06).

== See also ==
- Roads in Cape Verde
