= Serra Malagueta =

Mountain range & natural park in Cape Verde

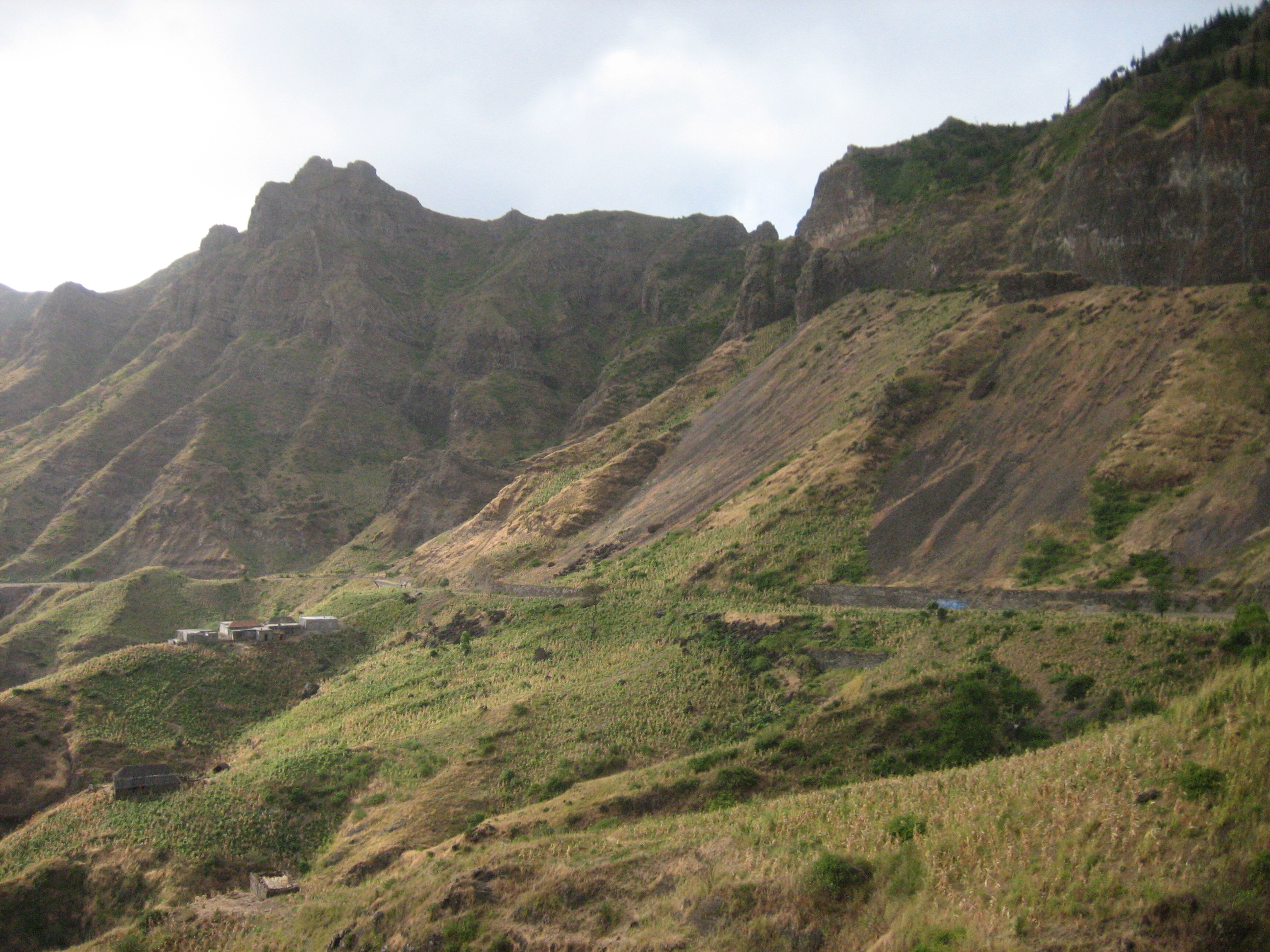
- Serra Malagueta

Highest point
- Elevation: 1,064 m (3,491 ft)
- Prominence: 2nd in Santiago
- Listing: List of mountains in Cape Verde
- Coordinates: 15°10′46″N 23°40′20″W

Geography
- Location within Cape Verde
- Location: northern Santiago

Geology
- Rock age(s): Miocene and Pliocene
- Rock type(s): basalt, basanite

Climbing
- Easiest route: dirt road

Serra Malagueta is a mountain range located in the northern part of the island of Santiago, Cape Verde. At 1064m elevation, it is the highest point of northern Santiago. The mountain range is protected as the Serra Malagueta Natural Park (Parque Natural de Serra Malagueta), which was established on February 24, 2005, and covers 774 hectares. The natural park is situated in the municipalities Tarrafal, São Miguel and Santa Catarina. The summit is in São Miguel, south of the Ribeira Principal valley. The Serra Malagueta formation is of volcanic origin, and was formed between 2.9 and 2.4 million years ago.

== Flora ==
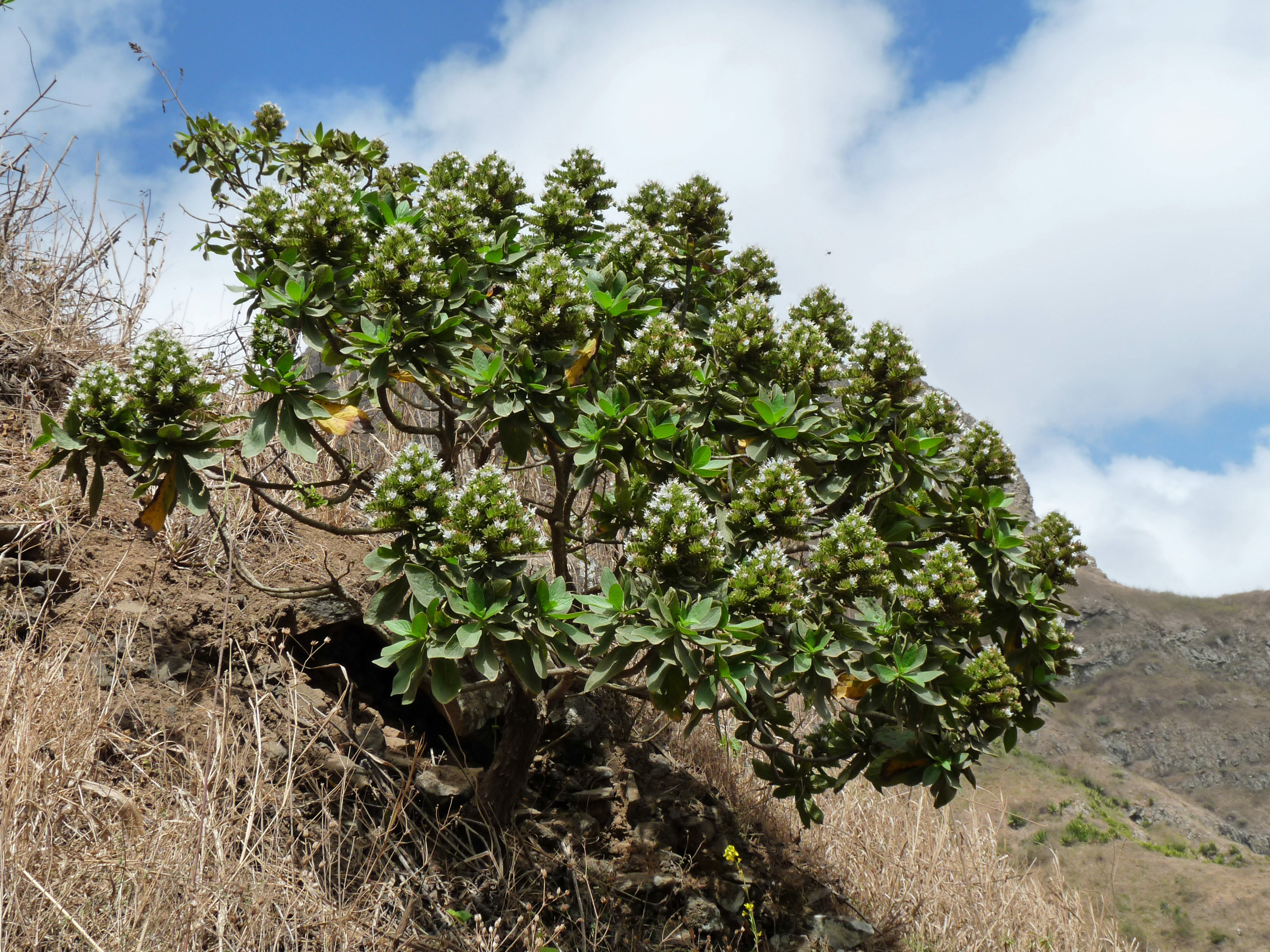
Echium hypertropicum (cowtongue) by Ribeira Principal

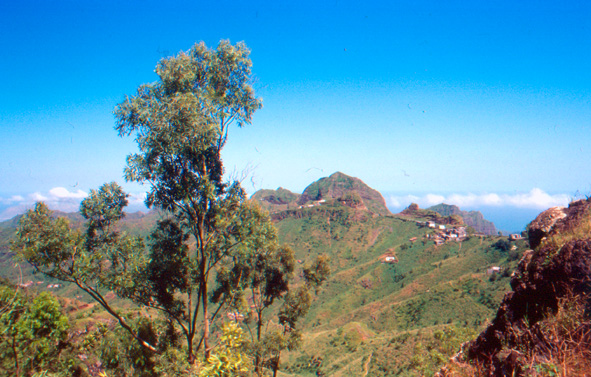
View of Serra Malagueta facing the southwest

The park features about 124 species of plants, of which 28 are endemic species or subspecies. The endemic plants are threatened by invasive species from outside the park including Lantana camara (lantana) and Furcraea foetida (giant cabuya). Limonium lobinii (carqueja de Santiago) is only found in this park.

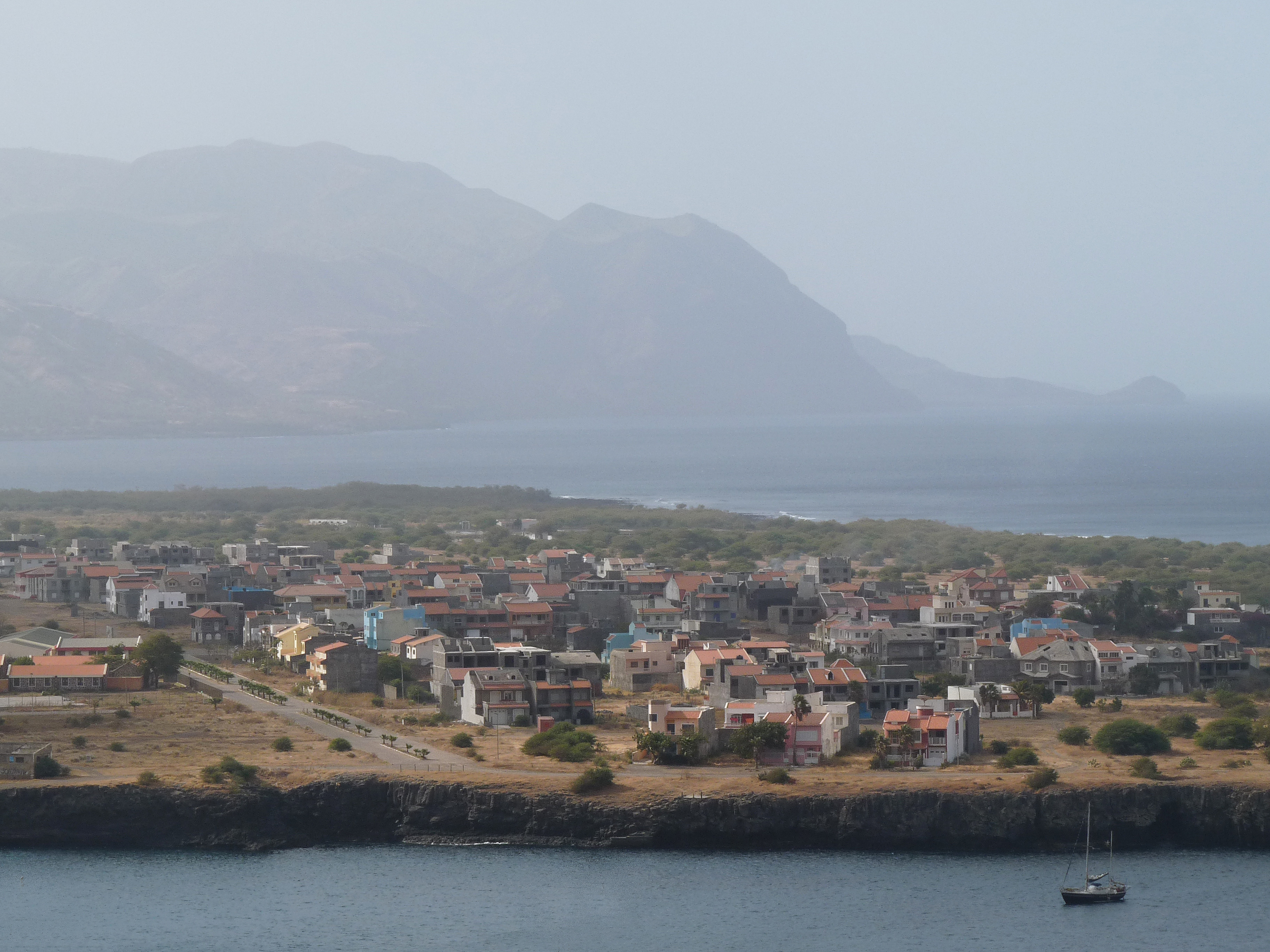
The west of Serra Malagueta with Tarrafal from Monte Graciosa on a slight hazy day

== Fauna ==
In the park, there are 19 species of birds, of which eight are endemic. Many of these are endangered, including Ardea purpurea bournei (Bourne's heron), Acrocephalus brevipennis (Cape Verde warbler) and Cape Verde buzzard (Buteo bannermani). Four species of mammals are found, including one species of monkey. Six species of reptiles are found (four are endemic), and one endemic amphibian species. Invertebrates such as butterflies are found including Acherontia atropos and Papilio demodocus; one beetle is endangered: Diplognatha gagates.

== See also ==
- List of mountains in Cape Verde
