= Achada Monte =

- Settlement
- Coordinates: 15.234°N 23.643°W
- Country: Cape Verde
- Island: Santiago
- Municipality: São Miguel
- Civil parish: São Miguel Arcanjo

Population (2010)
  - Total: 1,652
- ID: 76102

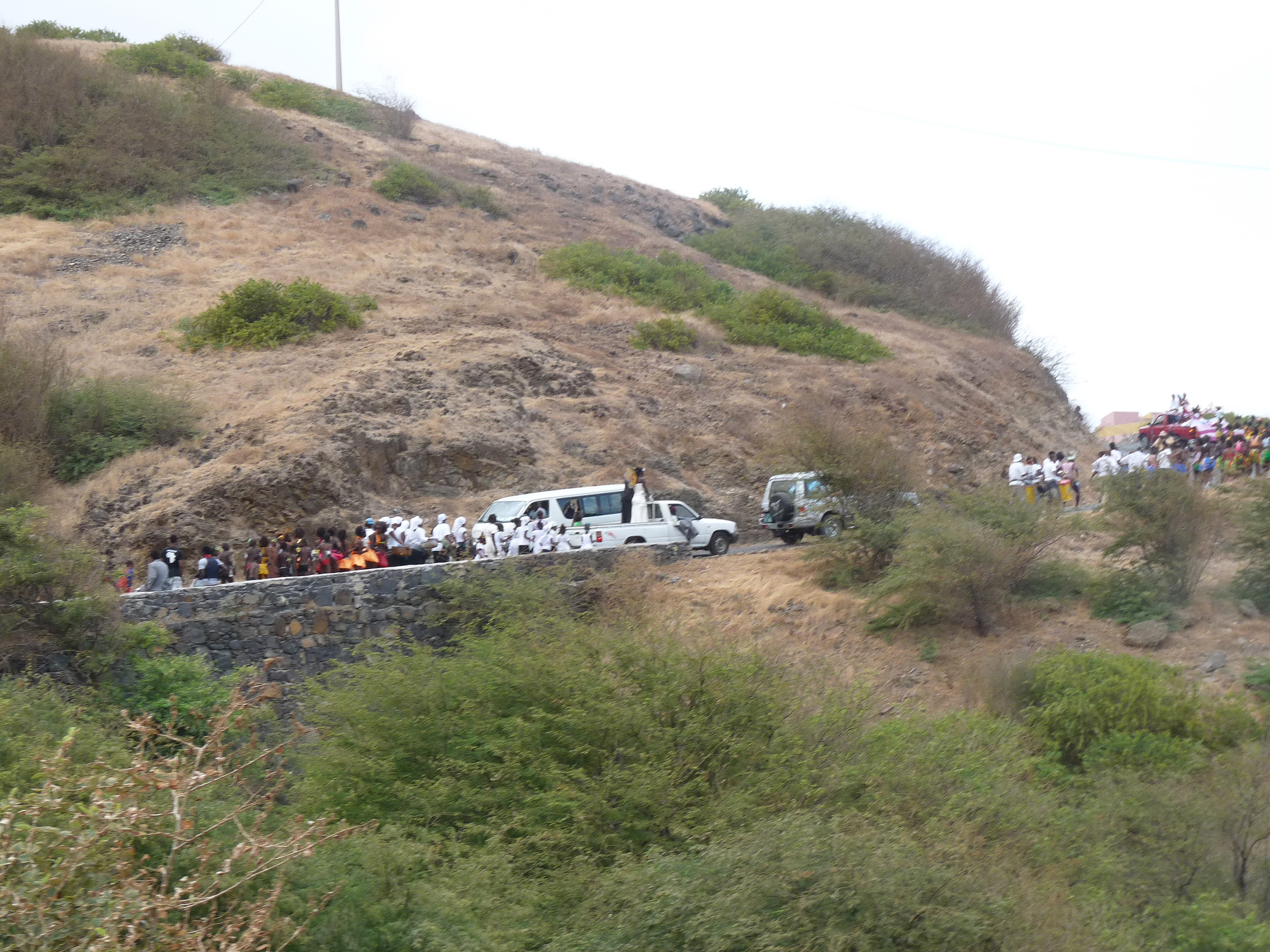

Achada Monte is a town in the northern part of the island of Santiago, Cape Verde and is part of the municipality of São Miguel. It is situated near the east coast, 8 km northwest of Calheta de São Miguel. In 2010 its population was 1,652. It is on the road connecting Praia and Tarrafal through Pedra Badejo, the EN1-ST02. The small bay Mangue de Sete Ribeiras is located east of the settlement. Ribeira Principal flows west of the village.
