= Ribeirão Chiqueiro =

- Settlement
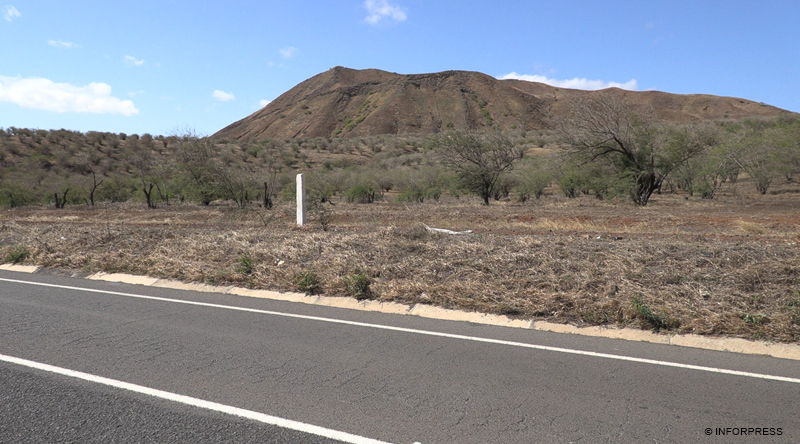
- View of the town of Ribeirão Chiqueiro, in the municipality of São Domingos, Santiago Island, Cape Verde.

- Location within Cape Verde
- Coordinates: 15.0055°N 23.5241°W
- Country: Cape Verde
- Island: Santiago
- Municipality: São Domingos
- Civil parish: São Nicolau Tolentino

Population (2010)
  - Total: 773
- ID: 75214

Ribeirão Chiqueiro is a village in the southcentral part of the island of Santiago, Cape Verde. It is part of the municipality of São Domingos. It is 5 km southeast of the municipal seat São Domingos. In 2010 its population was 775. Its elevation is around 270 m. The national road EN1-ST01 (Praia - Assomada - Tarrafal) passes near the village.
