= EN1-ST01 =

Road in Cape Verde

Coordinates: 15.0917°N 23.6534°W

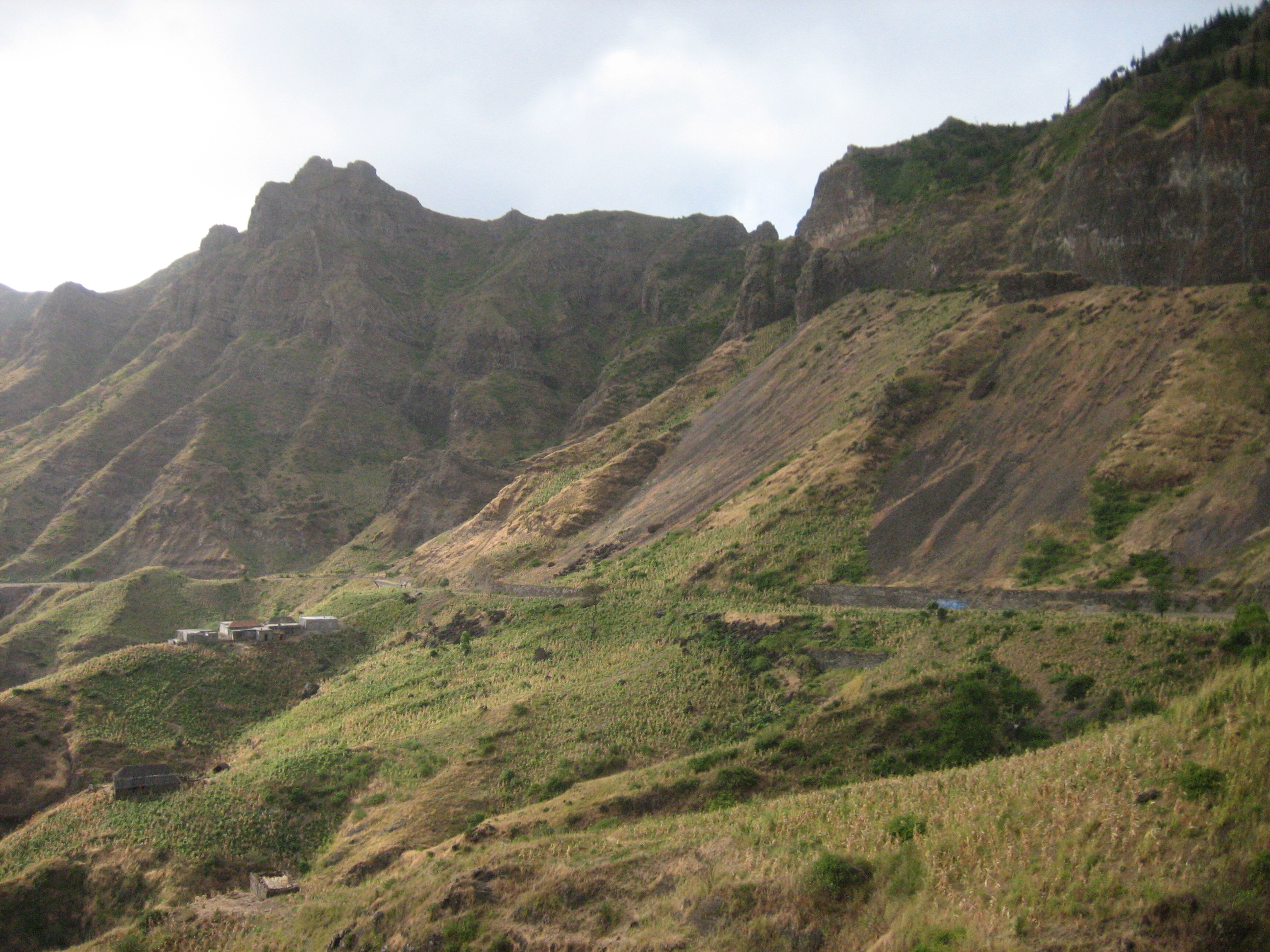
- The road in the Serra Malagueta mountains

Route information
- Length: 61 km (38 mi)

Major junctions
- South end: North Praia
- North end: Tarrafal

Location
- Country: Cabo Verde
- Regions: Santiago
- Major cities: São Domingos, Assomada

Highway system
- Roads in Cabo Verde

EN1-ST01 is a first class national road on the island of Santiago, Cape Verde. It runs from the capital Praia in the south to Tarrafal in the north, through the mountainous interior of the island. It is 61 km long.

The main intersections are:

- north of Praia: Circular da Praia (EN1-ST06)
- north of Ribeirão Chiqueiro: to Pedra Badejo (EN1-ST02)
- east of João Teves: to Pedra Badejo (EN1-ST03)
- north of Assomada: to Calheta de São Miguel (EN1-ST04)
- in Tarrafal: to Calheta de São Miguel (EN1-ST02)

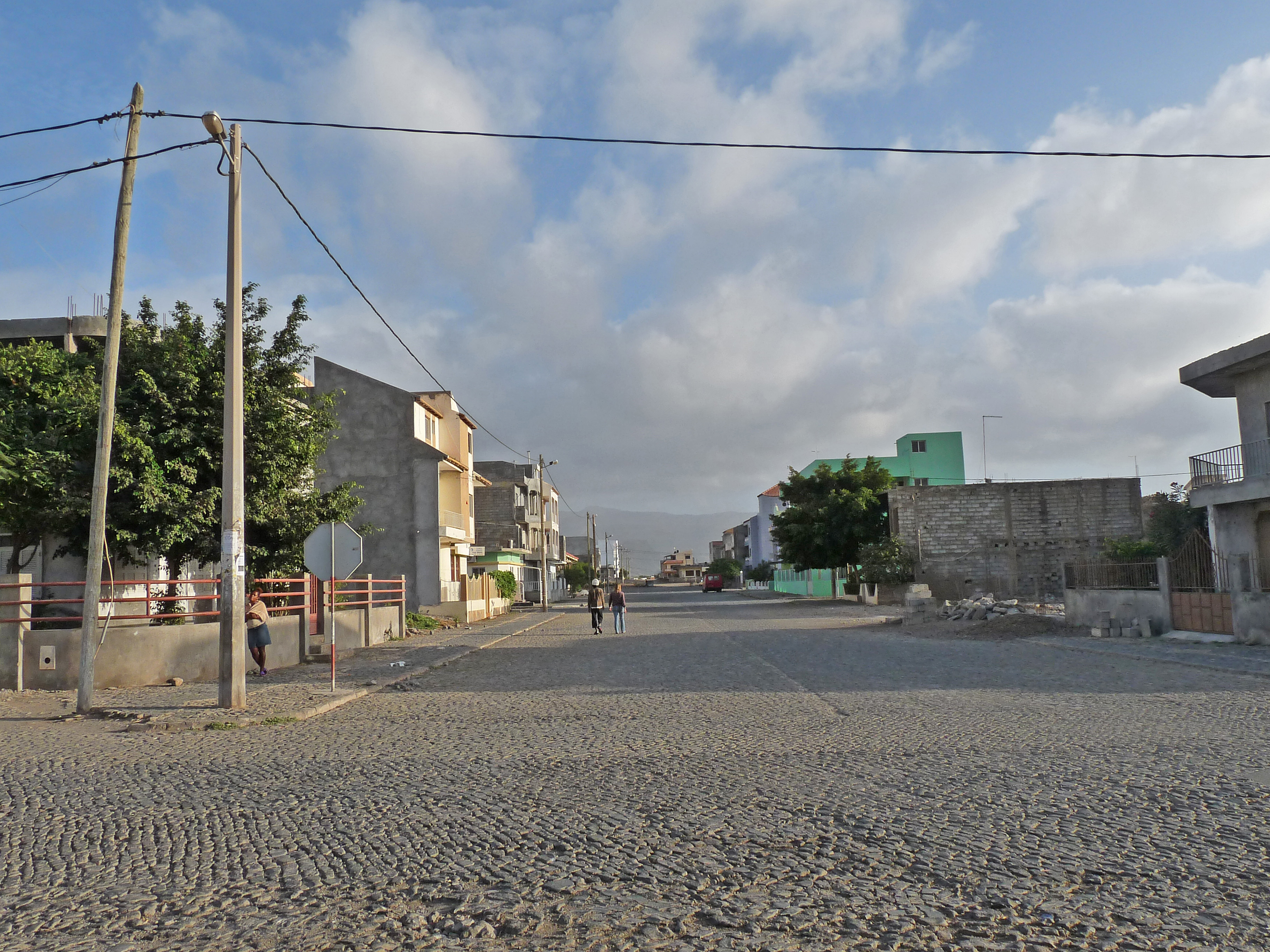
A street in Tarrafal, the northern terminus of the route

== See also ==
- Roads in Cape Verde
