= Picos, Cape Verde =

Picos
- Settlement
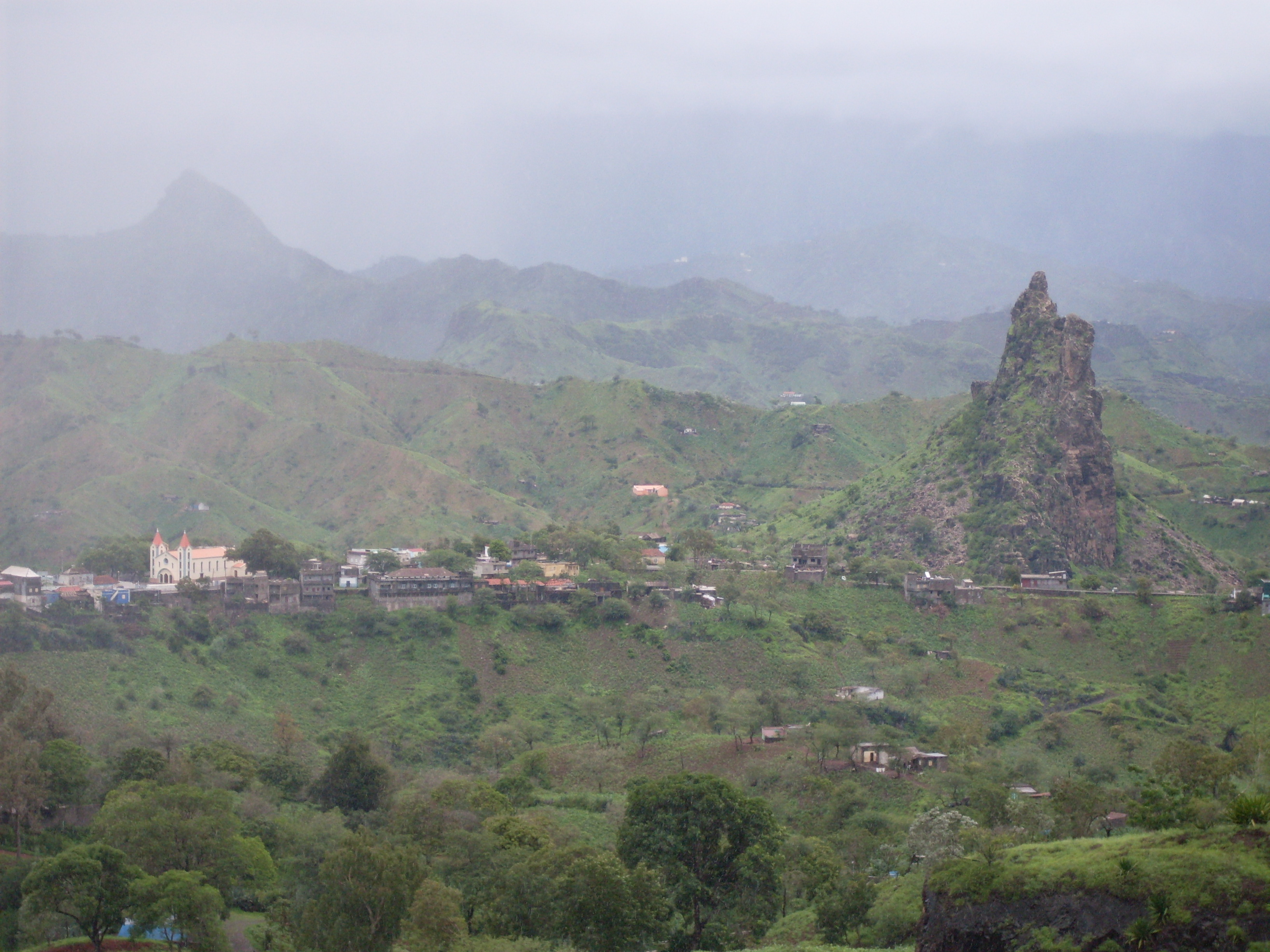

- Location within Cape Verde
- Coordinates: 15.083°N 23.632°W
- Country: Cape Verde
- Island: Santiago
- Municipality: São Salvador do Mundo
- Civil parish: São Salvador do Mundo

Population (2010)
  - Total: 986
- ID: 77102

Picos, also known as Achada Igreja, is a city in the central part of the island of Santiago, Cape Verde. It is the seat of São Salvador do Mundo municipality. Picos is located 4 km southeast of Assomada and 23 km northwest of the capital city of Praia, near the national road from Praia to Tarrafal via Assomada (EN1-ST01).

Picos is surrounded by mountains, and lies about 4 km north of the highest peak of the island of Santiago, Pico de Antónia.

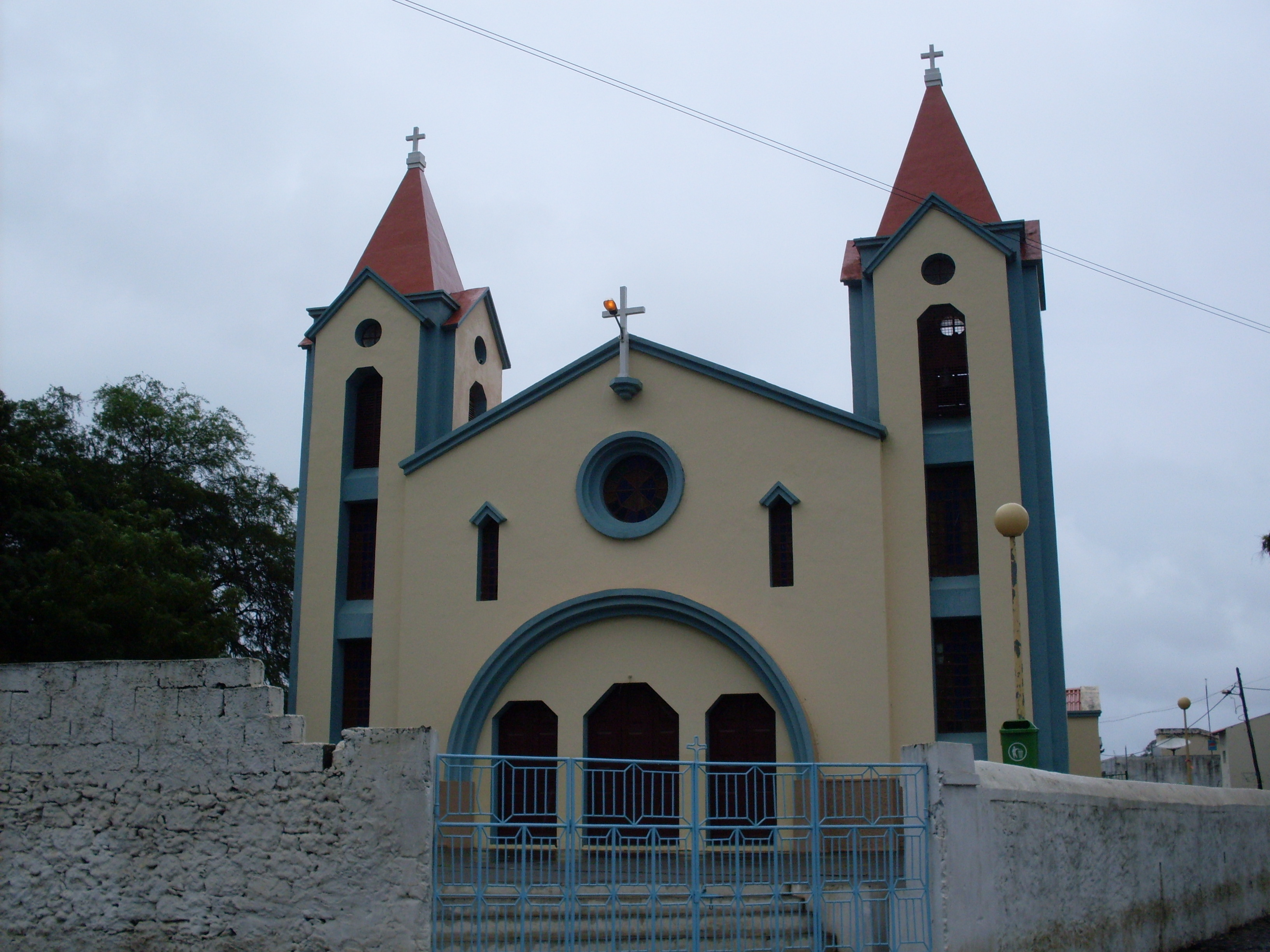
São Salvador do Mundo church

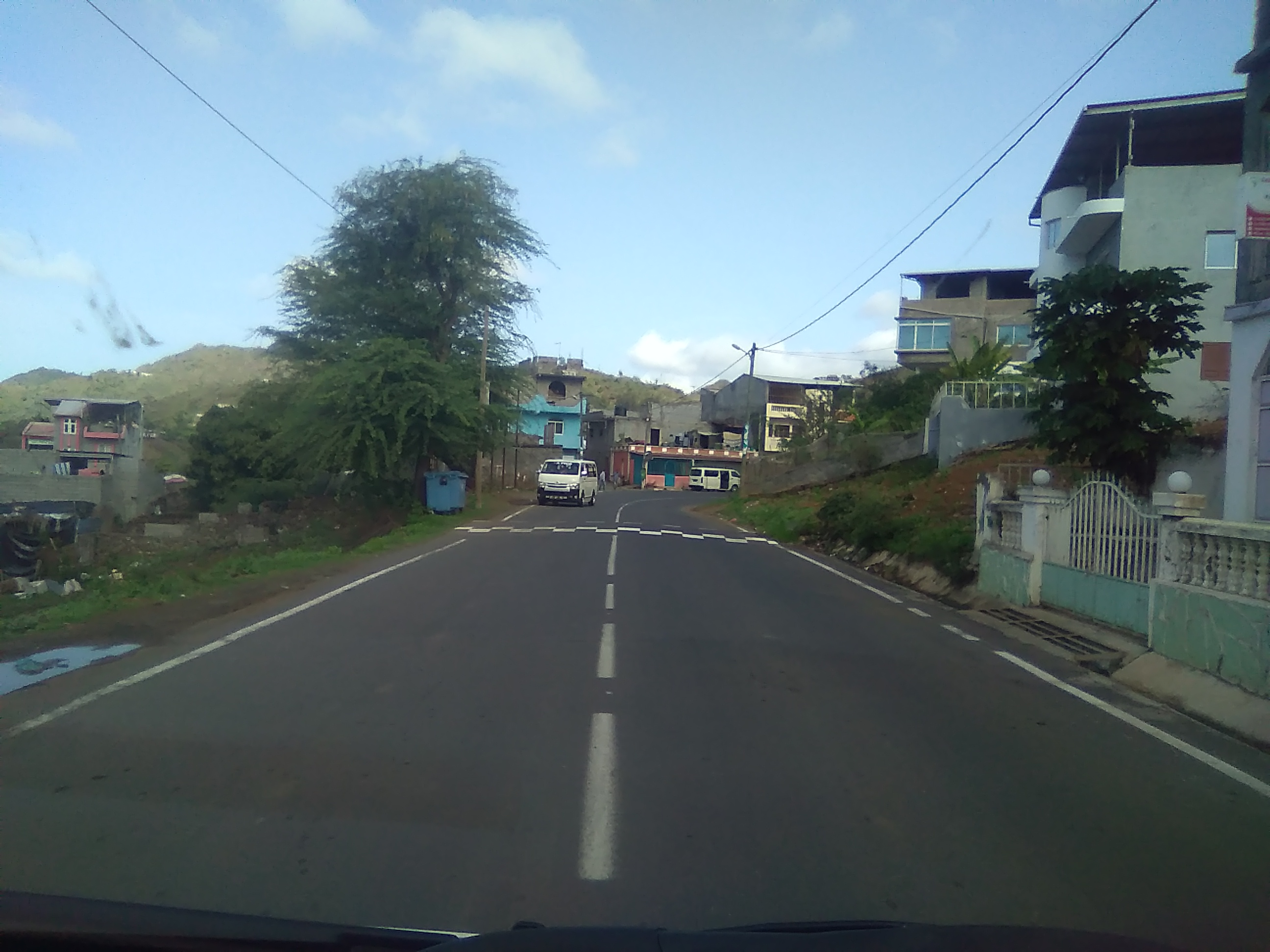
Downtown Achada Igreja

== History ==
Picos was the seat of the municipality of Santa Catarina between 1834 and 1859. In May 2005, the parish of São Salvador do Mundo was split from the municipality of Santa Catarina to become a separate municipality, and Picos became its seat.
