= Santiago, Cape Verde =

Largest island of Cape Verde

Santiago
Nickname: Ilha-berço (cradle island)
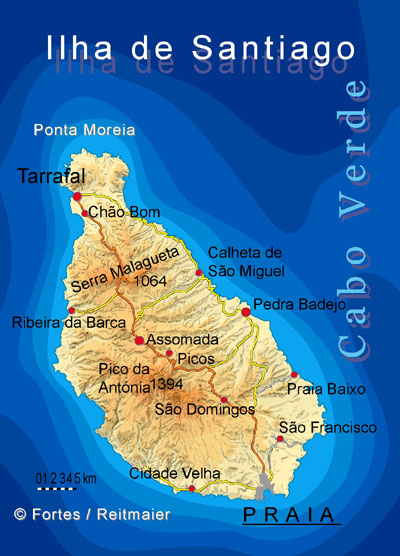

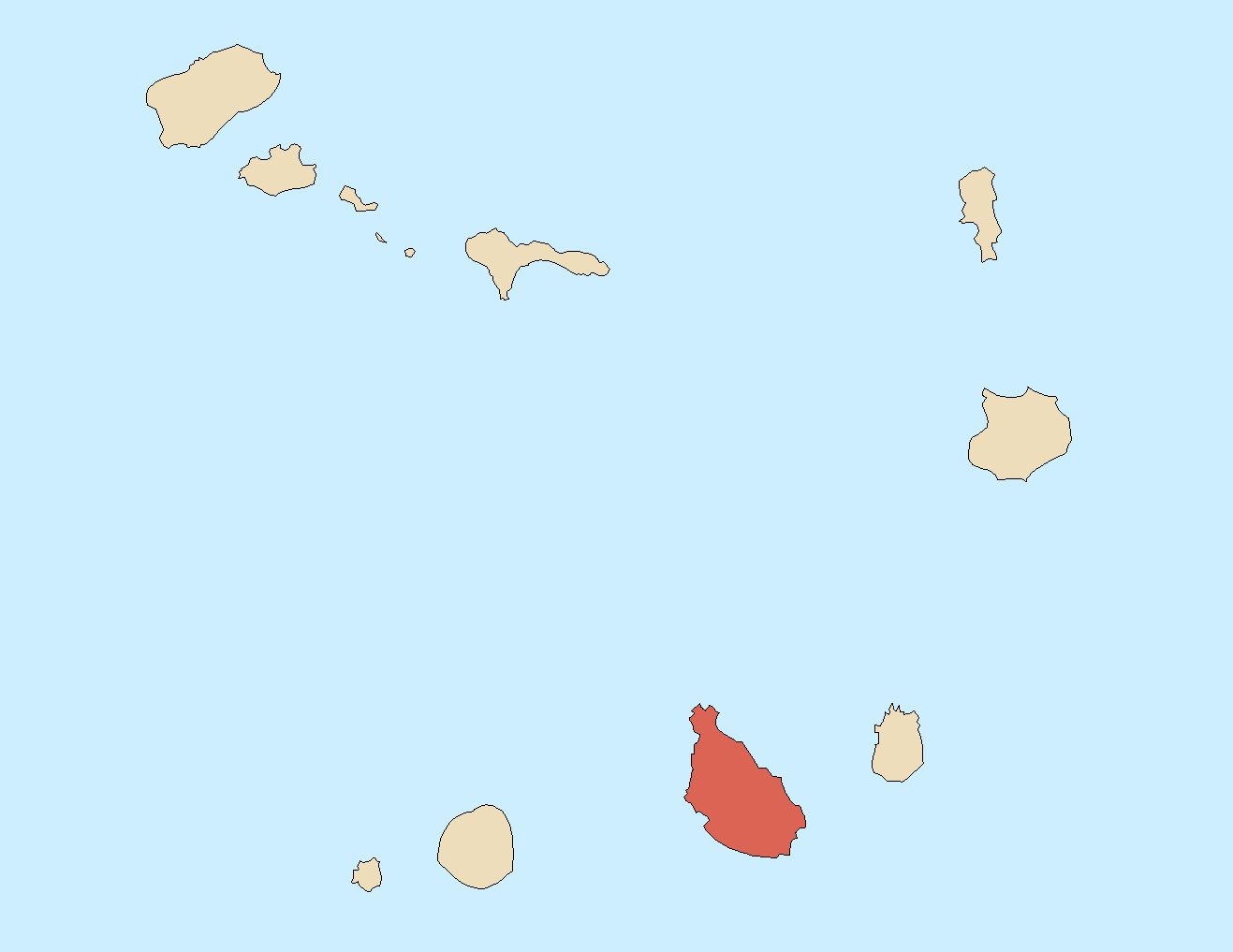

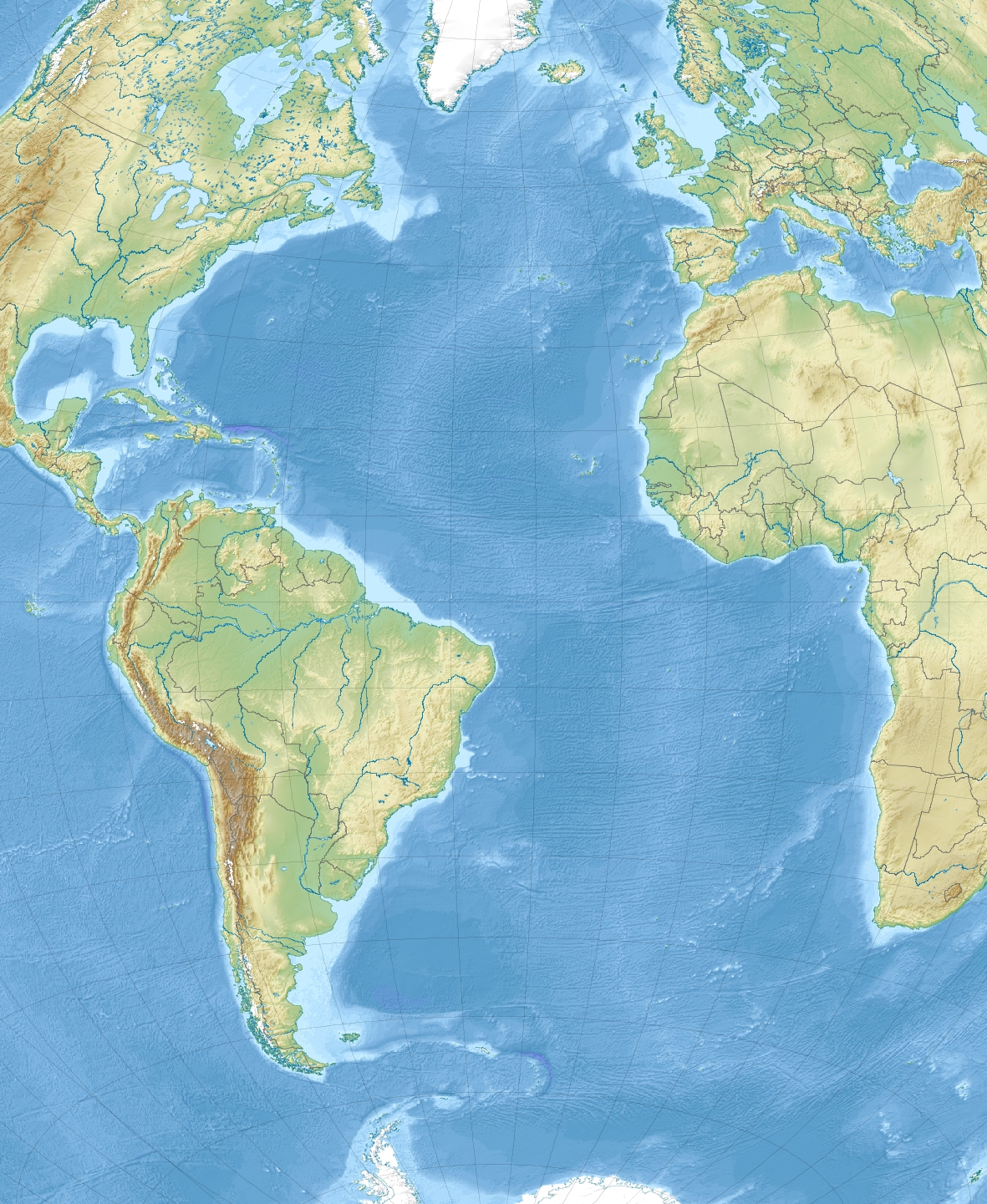
- Location within Cape Verde Location within Atlantic Ocean

Geography
- Location: Atlantic Ocean
- Coordinates: 15°04′N 23°38′W
- Area: 991 km^{2} (383 sq mi)
- Length: 54.9 km (34.11 mi)
- Width: 28.8 km (17.9 mi)
- Highest elevation: 1,392 m (4567 ft)
- Highest point: Pico de Antónia

Administration
- Cape Verde
- Concelhos (Municipalities): Praia, Ribeira Grande de Santiago, Santa Catarina, Santa Cruz, São Domingos, São Lourenço dos Órgãos, São Miguel, São Salvador do Mundo, Tarrafal
- Largest settlement: Praia (pop. 151,436)

Demographics
- Population: 294,135 (2015)
- Pop. density: 296.8/km^{2} (768.7/sq mi)

Santiago (Portuguese for “Saint James”) is the largest island of Cape Verde, its most important agricultural centre and home to half the nation's population. Part of the Sotavento Islands, it lies between the islands of Maio (26 km (16 mi) to the east) and Fogo (55 kilometres (34 miles) to the west). It was the first of the islands to be settled: the town of Ribeira Grande (now Cidade Velha and a UNESCO World Heritage Site) was founded in 1462. Santiago is home to the nation's capital city of Praia.

== History ==
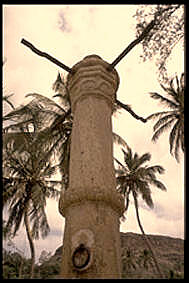
The pillory in Cidade Velha.

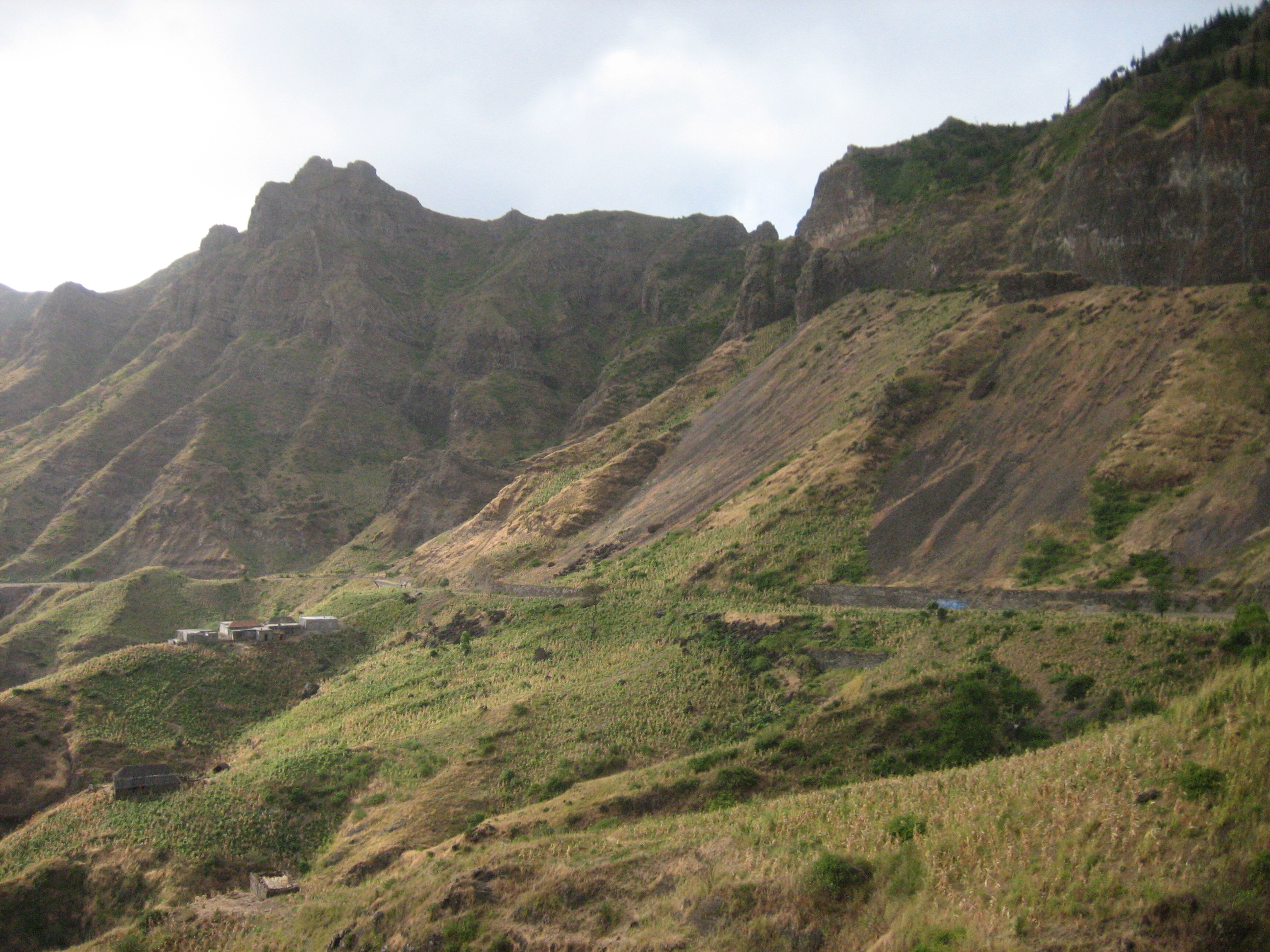
The Serra Malagueta mountain range in the northern part of the island of Santiago, Cape Verde

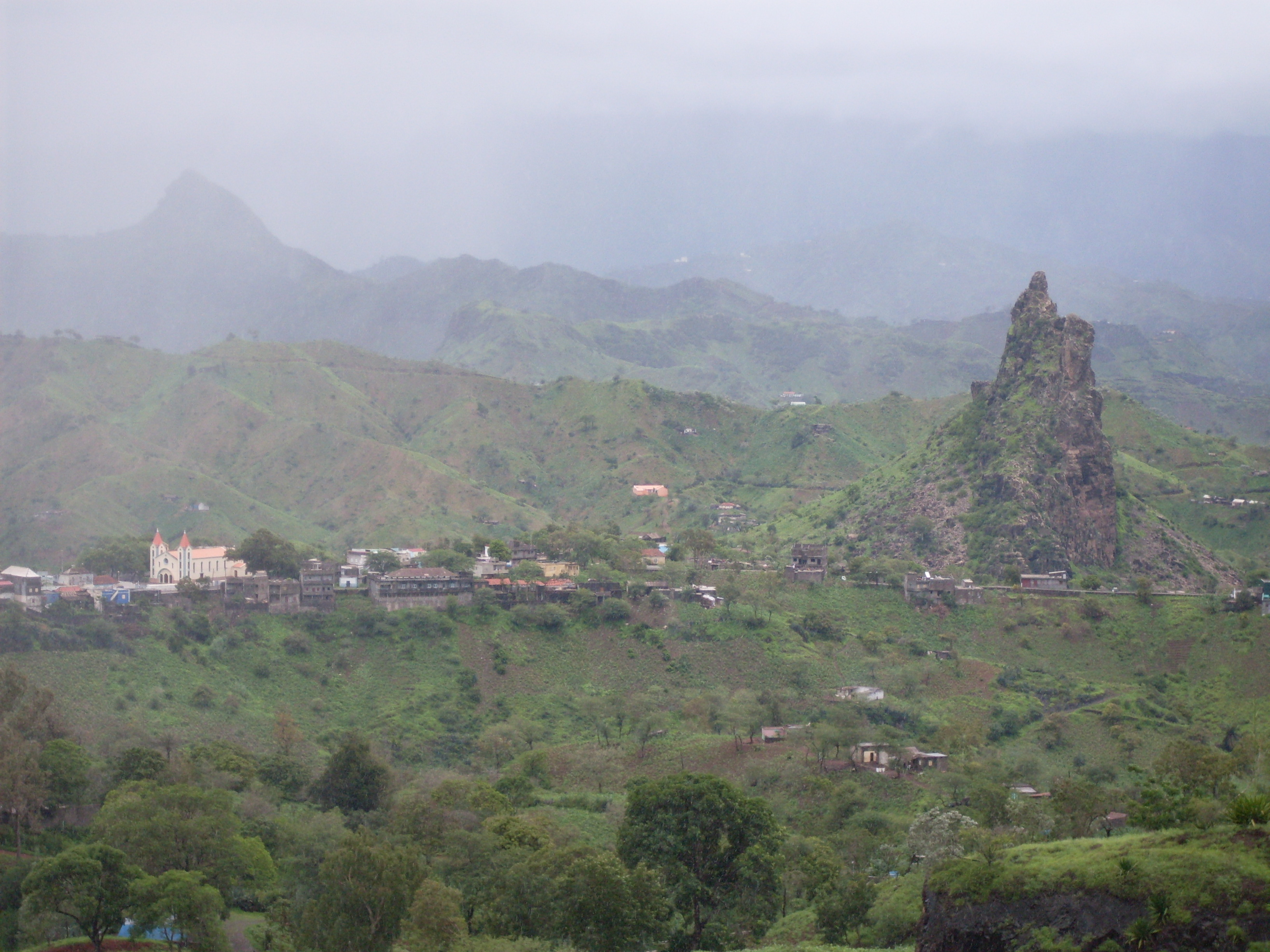
Santiago island. The wetter climate of the interior and the eastern coast contrasts with the dryer one in the south/southwest coast

The eastern side of the nearby island of Fogo collapsed into the ocean 73,000 years ago, creating a tsunami 170 metres (558 ft) high which struck Santiago.

In 1460, António de Noli became the first to visit the island. Da Noli settled at Ribeira Grande (now Cidade Velha) with his family members and Portuguese from Algarve and Alentejo in 1462. Transcontinental slavery made Cidade Velha the second richest city in the Portuguese realm. The wealth of Ribeira Grande and conflicts between Portugal and rival colonial powers France and Britain attracted pirate attacks, including those by Francis Drake (1585) and Jacques Cassard (1712). Ribeira Grande went into decline, and the capital was moved to Praia in 1770.

Cessation in the slave trade in the 19th century resulted in an economic crisis, and the growing port of Mindelo on São Vicente replaced Praia as the most important port. With few natural resources and inadequate sustainable investment from the Portuguese, the citizens grew increasingly discontented with the colonial masters, who nevertheless refused to provide the local authorities with more autonomy. The island's native population was disadvantaged by the Portuguese colonial system and supported Amílcar Cabral and the African Party for the Independence of Guinea and Cape Verde and the independence of 1975.

== Geography ==
Santiago is the largest island of Cape Verde, with an area of 991 square kilometres (383 square miles). It is 54.9 km long and 28.8 km wide. The island is mountainous, although slightly flatter in the southeast. The interior and the east coast are seasonally, and somewhat sporadically, hot tropical in climate and forested, whereas the south and southwest occupy the central uplands' arid rain shadow.

The tallest summit is Pico de Antónia, elevation 1,392 m (4,567 ft), barely west of Picos, in the centre of the island. The second is Serra Malagueta between Assomada and Tarrafal in the north. Other mountain ranges include Órgãos in the municipality of São Lourenço dos Órgãos and Monte das Vacas near Praia.

Santiago's west coast is rugged, especially at Baía do Inferno, and less populated than the east and south coasts. The most important rivers are Ribeira Seca, Ribeira Grande de Santiago, Ribeira Principal and Ribeira da Trindade. The southernmost point is Ponta Temerosa and the northernmost, Ponta Moreia.

The Cape Verde islands are very naturally degraded. Due to their proximity to the Sahara, most are dry, but on those with high mountains and farther away from the continent, by orography (relief precipitation), the humidity is much higher, giving small upland rainforest habitats, but strongly affected by human presence. Northeastern slopes of high mountains receive heavy rain several times most years. Much of the altitude is sufficient for a mild climate and subject-to-seasonal-drought but typically moist soil. Some islands, as on Santiago, have vegetation-clad (cloud forests) where the dense moisture condenses and soaks the plants, and soil.

== Administrative divisions ==
Since 2005, the island of Santiago is divided into nine municipalities: Praia, Ribeira Grande de Santiago, Santa Catarina, Santa Cruz, São Domingos, São Lourenço dos Órgãos, São Miguel, São Salvador do Mundo and Tarrafal. Before the creation of the municipality of Santa Catarina in 1834, the island was one municipality. Since then, seven more municipalities were created as shown below.

Parish	1834	1872	1917	1971	1994	1997	2005
Santo Amaro Abade	SC	SC	TA	TA	TA	TA	TA = Tarrafal
São Miguel Arcanjo	SC	SC	TA	TA	TA	SM	SM = São Miguel
Santa Catarina	SC	SC	SC	SC	SC	SC	SC = Santa Catarina
São Salvador do Mundo	SC	PR	PR	SC	SC	SC	SSM = São Salvador do Mundo
São João Baptista	SC	PR	PR	PR	PR	PR	RGST = Ribeira Grande de Santiago
Santíssimo Nome de Jesus	PR	PR	PR	PR	PR	PR	RGST = Ribeira Grande de Santiago
Santiago Maior	PR	PR	PR	SZ	SZ	SZ	SZ = Santa Cruz
São Lourenço dos Órgãos	PR	PR	PR	SZ	SZ	SZ	SLO = São Lourenço dos Órgãos
Nossa Senhora da Graça	PR	PR	PR	PR	PR	PR	PR = Praia
Nossa Senhora da Luz	PR	PR	PR	PR	SD	SD	SD = São Domingos
São Nicolau Tolentino	PR	PR	PR	PR	SD	SD	SD = São Domingos

== Population ==
Praia, located in the southeast coast, is the largest city on the island, and also the largest city and capital of the country. Other towns on the island include Cidade Velha, west of Praia, Cape Verde's first capital; Assomada, in the centre of the island; Tarrafal in the north; Pedra Badejo and Calheta de São Miguel along the east coast.

In the 1830s, Santiago's population was estimated at 30,000. Santiago has always been the most populous island in Cape Verde. The island population has doubled since the independence of Cape Verde in 1975. The population of the island was 294,135 in 2015; the population density was 297/km^{2}.

Population of Santiago (1940—2015)
Year	Population
1940	77,382
1950	59,397
1960	88,587
1970	128,782
1980	145,957
1990	175,691
2000	236,352
2010	273,919
2015	294,135

== Transport ==
=== Air ===
Santiago is served by the Nelson Mandela International Airport, near Praia. It is the second busiest airport in Cape Verde, after Amílcar Cabral International Airport on Sal, with 662,356 passengers in 2017.

=== Water ===
The main port of Santiago is Praia Harbor, in Praia. It is the second busiest port in Cape Verde, after Porto Grande Bay on São Vicente, with 817,845 metric tonnes of cargo and 85,518 passengers handled in 2017. There are ferry connections from Praia Harbor to the islands of Brava, Fogo, São Nicolau, São Vicente, Maio, Boa Vista and Sal. There are several small fishing ports along the coast, including Tarrafal, Cidade Velha, Pedra Badejo and Calheta de São Miguel.

=== Road ===
Santiago has 417 km (259 mi) of national roads, of which 167 km (104 mi) first class roads. In addition, there are several municipal and local roads. The first class national roads are:

Number	Route
EN1-ST01	North Praia - São Domingos - João Teves - Assomada - Tarrafal
EN1-ST02	Ribeirão Chiqueiro - Pedra Badejo - Calheta de São Miguel - Achada Monte - Tarrafal (Variante Tarrafal)
EN1-ST03	João Teves - Achada Fazenda
EN1-ST04	Boa Entrada - Calheta de São Miguel
EN1-ST05	West Praia - São Martinho Grande - Cidade Velha
EN1-ST06	West Praia - North Praia - Praia Airport - Praia Harbor (Circular da Praia)

Public transport within the city of Praia is provided by the city buses of the company SolAtlântico. Intercity public transport is provided by share taxis and minibuses. In 2015 a project called EcobusCV started running a fleet of dual fuel waste vegetable oil / diesel minibuses between Praia and Assomada. However, services were suspended in November 2016.

== Economy ==
The main industries are agriculture, tourism, fishing and others, alongside some manufacturing. Main agricultural products are corn, sugarcane, banana, coffee and mangoes. potatoes

== Education ==
Several institutes of higher education are active on Santiago: University of Cape Verde (Praia, Assomada and São Jorge), Jean Piaget University of Cape Verde (Praia), Universidade de Santiago (Assomada, Praia and Tarrafal), Instituto Superior de Ciências Económicas e Empresariais (Praia), Instituto Superior de Ciências Jurídicas e Sociais (Praia) and Universidade Lusofona de Cabo Verde (Praia). The Liceu Domingos Ramos is a public secondary school in Praia. The National Library of Cape Verde is also located in Praia.

== Nature ==
Santiago has the most diverse flora and fauna of all Cape Verde: it has 1,915 identified land species, of which 289 are endemic. It is also the most forested island of Cape Verde: 38% of its area is forest. The only protected areas of the island are the Natural Parks of Serra do Pico de Antónia and Serra Malagueta, covering 3.68% of the island.

Endangered endemic species of flora and fauna on Santiago include the plants Campanula bravensis, Campylanthus glaber, Conyza feae, Conyza pannosa, Diplotaxis varia, Echium hypertropicum, Limonium lobinii, Micromeria forbesii, Sonchus daltonii and Umbilicus schmidtii, and the animals Chioninia vaillantii and Tarentola rudis.

== Sports ==
Several sports are practised on Santiago, including football (soccer), basketball, volleyball, track and field, futsal and athletics. There are two football associations on the island: Santiago North and Santiago South, each with its own competitions. Santiago possesses the most major sports complexes in the country, they include Estádio da Várzea in Praia, Cumbém in Assomada, Mangue in Tarrafal, one in Pedra Badejo and Estádio da Calheta in Calheta de São Miguel.

== Notable residents ==
- Elida Almeida, singer
- André Álvares de Almada, writer, trader and explorer
- Orlanda Amarílis, writer
- Lúcio Antunes, coach
- Babanco, footballer
- Jorge Barbosa, writer
- Gardénia Benrós, singer
- Cao, footballer
- Codé di Dona, writer
- Djaniny, footballer
- Abílio Duarte, politician
- Mito Elias, painter
- Gilyto, singer
- António Mascarenhas Monteiro, former President
- José Maria Neves, former Prime Minister and present President
- Orlando Pantera, musician
- António Pedro, Portuguese writer
- Piguita, footballer
- Ivone Ramos, writer
- Tomé Varela da Silva, writer, poet and philosopher
- Ronny Souto (Ronny), footballer
- Tcheka, singer
- Manuel Veiga, writer, linguist
- Arménio Vieira, writer

== See also ==
- List of buildings and structures in Santiago, Cape Verde
