= List of lighthouses in Cape Verde =

The following article is a list of lighthouses in Cape Verde. Cape Verde has tens of lighthouses scattered across its nine major islands. The lighthouses are administered by the Direction of Marine and Ports (Direcção Geral de Marinha e Portos) or DGMP.

== Boa Vista ==
Name	Image	Year built	Location & coordinates	Class of light	Focal height (metres)	NGA number	Admiralty number	Range (nautical miles)
Morro Negro Lighthouse		1930	Morre Negro	Fl W 20s	163	113-24196	D2914	31
Ponta da Escuma Lighthouse		1888	Ilhéu de Sal-Rei	Fl(5) WR 20s	28	113-24192	D2918	11
Ponta Varandinha Lighthouse	Image		Ponta Varandinha	Fl(2) W 6s	22	113-24197	D2916	10

== Brava ==
Name	Image	Year built	Location & coordinates	Class of light	Focal height (metres)	NGA number	Admiralty number	Range (nautical miles)
Ilhéu de Cima Lighthouse			Ilhéu de Cima	Fl(3) W 12s	80	113-24260	D2904	9
Ponta Nhô Martinho Lighthouse			Ponta Nho Martinho	Fl(4) W 15s	29	113-24240	D2910	9
Ponta Jalunga Lighthouse	Image	1891	Furna	Fl(2+1) W 15s	26	113-24236	D2908	5

== Fogo ==
Name	Image	Year built	Location & coordinates	Class of light	Focal height	NGA number	Admiralty number	Range nml
Ponta do Alcatraz Lighthouse		n/a	Dacabalaio; 14°50′14″N 24°18′52″W	Fl W 4s.	135 metres (443 ft)	24256	D2904	9

== Maio ==
Name	Image	Year built	Location & coordinates	Class of light	Focal height	NGA number	Admiralty number	Range nml
Forte de São José Lighthouse	Image	1887	Forte de São José; 15°08′12″N 23°12′45″W	Fl (3) R 12s.	22 metres (72 ft)	24200	D2872	9
Ponta Cais Lighthouse		n/a	Ponta Cais; 15°20′15″N 23°10′47″W	Fl W 7s.	14 metres (46 ft)	24202	D2874	10

== Sal ==
Name	Image	Year built	Location & coordinates	Class of light	Focal height	NGA number	Admiralty number	Range nml
Pedra de Lume Lighthouse		n/a	Pedra de Lume; 16°45′50″N 22°53′34″W	F R (occasional)	13 metres (43 ft)	24180	D2923.1	1
Ponta do Norte Lighthouse		~1940	Ponta do Norte; 16°51′05″N 22°54′54″W	Fl (3) W 12s.	16 metres (52 ft)	24147	D2919.75	8
Ponta do Sinó Lighthouse		1892	Santa Maria; 16°35′20″N 22°55′17″W	Fl (2+1) W 15s.	11 metres (36 ft)	24164	D2922	8
Ponta de Vera Cruz Lighthouse		n/a	Santa Maria; 16°35′47″N 22°54′15″W	F R	5 metres (16 ft)	24168	D2922.5	3

== Santiago ==
Name	Image	Year built	Location & coordinates	Class of light	Focal height	NGA number	Admiralty number	Range nml
Dona Maria Pia Lighthouse		1881	Ponta Temerosa; 14°54′02″N 23°30′33″W	Fl (2) W 6s.	25 metres (82 ft)	24204	D2876	15
Ponta do Lobo Lighthouse		1887	Ponta do Lobo; 14°59′14″N 23°25′49″W	Fl (4) W 15s.	17 metres (56 ft)	24210	D2882	6
Ponta Moreia Lighthouse	Image	n/a	Municipality of Tarrafal; 15°20′18″N 23°44′34″W	Fl (5) W 20s.	97 metres (318 ft)	24214	D2888	10
Ponta Preta Lighthouse		1889 est.	Tarrafal; 15°17′34″N 23°46′16″W	Fl (3) W 12s.	34 metres (112 ft)	24215	D2890	8

== Santo Antão ==
Name	Image	Year built	Location & coordinates	Class of light	Focal height	NGA number	Admiralty number	Range nml
Ponta de Mangrade Lighthouse		n/a	Ponta de Mangrade; 17°03′14″N 25°21′26″W	Fl (2) W 10s.	112 metres (367 ft)	24092	D2954	13
Ponta do Sol Lighthouse		n/a	Ponta do Sol; 17°12′15″N 25°05′23″W	Fl W 4s.	15 metres (49 ft)	24088	D2952	9
Ponta de Tumbo Lighthouse		1886	Janela; 17°06′52″N 24°58′13″W	Fl (4) 20s.	162 metres (531 ft)	24080	D2950	17

== São Nicolau ==
Name	Image	Year built	Location & coordinates	Class of light	Focal height	NGA number	Admiralty number	Range nml
Ponta do Barril Lighthouse	Image	1891	Ponta do Barril; 16°36′19″N 24°25′07″W	Fl (3) W 12s.	13 metres (43 ft)	24132	D2934	15
Ponta Leste Lighthouse		n/a	Ponta Leste; 16°34′09″N 24°00′37″W	Fl (4) 10s.	73 metres (240 ft)	24144	D2930	11
Pregujça Lighthouse		n/a	Preguiça; 16°33′42″N 24°17′06″W	Fl (2+1) R 15s.	25 metres (82 ft)	24136	D2936	5

== São Vicente ==
Name	Image	Year built	Location & coordinates	Class of light	Focal height	NGA number	Admiralty number	Range nml
Cabnave Lighthouse		n/a	Mindelo; 16°54′01″N 24°59′56″W	Fl R 2s.	8 metres (26 ft)	24104	D2943	8
Don Luís Lighthouse		1882 est.	Ilhéu dos Pássaros; 16°54′39″N 25°00′43″W	Fl (3) W 12s.	86 metres (282 ft)	24100	D2942	14
Dona Amélia Lighthouse		1894	São Pedro; 16°49′36″N 25°05′09″W	Fl W 5s.	56 metres (184 ft)	24096	D2946	17

== See also ==
- Lists of lighthouses and lightvessels
