= São Francisco, Cape Verde =

São Francisco
- Neighbourhood
- Interactive map of São Francisco
- Coordinates: 14.979°N 23.493°W
- Country: Cape Verde
- Island: Santiago Island
- City: Praia

Population (2010)
  - Total: 570
- Website: www.cmpraia.cv

São Francisco is a subdivision of the city of Praia in the island of Santiago, Cape Verde. Its population was 570 at the 2010 census. It is situated 7 km north of the city centre. 3.5 km to its east is the São Francisco Bay, and 2.5 km to its northeast the village Vale da Custa, part of the municipality of São Domingos.
