= Achada Baleia =

- Settlement
- Coordinates: 15.0463°N 23.4644°W
- Country: Cape Verde
- Island: Santiago
- Municipality: São Domingos
- Civil parish: Nossa Senhora da Luz

Population (2010)
  - Total: 376
- ID: 75101

Achada Baleia is a settlement in the eastern part of the island of Santiago, Cape Verde. It is part of the municipality of São Domingos. In 2010 its population was 376. It is situated near the east coast, 1.5 km southeast of Praia Baixo, 2 km northwest of Baía and 15 km northeast of Praia. It sits at an elevation of about 50 meters.
