= Dacabalaio, Santiago =

Dacabalaio
- Settlement
- Coordinates: 15.0142°N 23.6015°W
- Country: Cape Verde
- Island: Santiago
- Municipality: São Domingos
- Civil parish: São Nicolau Tolentino

Population (2010)
  - Total: 47
- ID: 75205

Dacabalaio is a village in the southcentral part of the island of Santiago, Cape Verde. It is part of the municipality of São Domingos. It is 2 km south of Rui Vaz and 4 km southwest of the municipal seat São Domingos. In 2010 its population was 47. Its elevation is about 710 m.
