= Ponta Bicuda =

Headland in Cape Verde

- Headland
- Cape Verde
- Coordinates: 15°20′06″N 23°42′48″W
- Location: Northern Santiago, Tarrafal Municipality
- Offshore water bodies: Atlantic Ocean

Ponta Bicuda is a headland in the northern part of the island of Santiago, Cape Verde. It is 3 km (1.9 mi) east of Ponta Moreia, the northernmost point of Santiago, and 8 kilometres (5.0 mi) northeast of Tarrafal. In the 1747 map by Jacques-Nicolas Bellin, the point was mentioned as "Pt. Bikkude".
