= Baía, Cape Verde =

Baía
- Settlement
- Coordinates: 15.0359°N 23.4518°W
- Country: Cape Verde
- Island: Santiago
- Municipality: São Domingos
- Civil parish: Nossa Senhora da Luz

Population (2010)
  - Total: 489
- ID: 75102

Baía is a settlement in the eastern part of the island of Santiago, Cape Verde. It is part of the municipality of São Domingos. In 2010 its population was 489. It is situated near the east coast, 2 km southeast of Achada Baleia, 2 km northwest of Moia Moia and 14 km northeast of Praia. It sits at an elevation of about 20 meters. The settlement consists of several localities, including Achada Baixo, Castelinho and Covão Santana. The ruined Gothic church of Nossa Senhora da Luz, which was part of the 15th century Portuguese settlement Alcatrazes, stands at the shore near Baía.
