= Ponta do Lobo Lighthouse =

Farol da Ponta do Lobo Farol de Ponta do Lobo
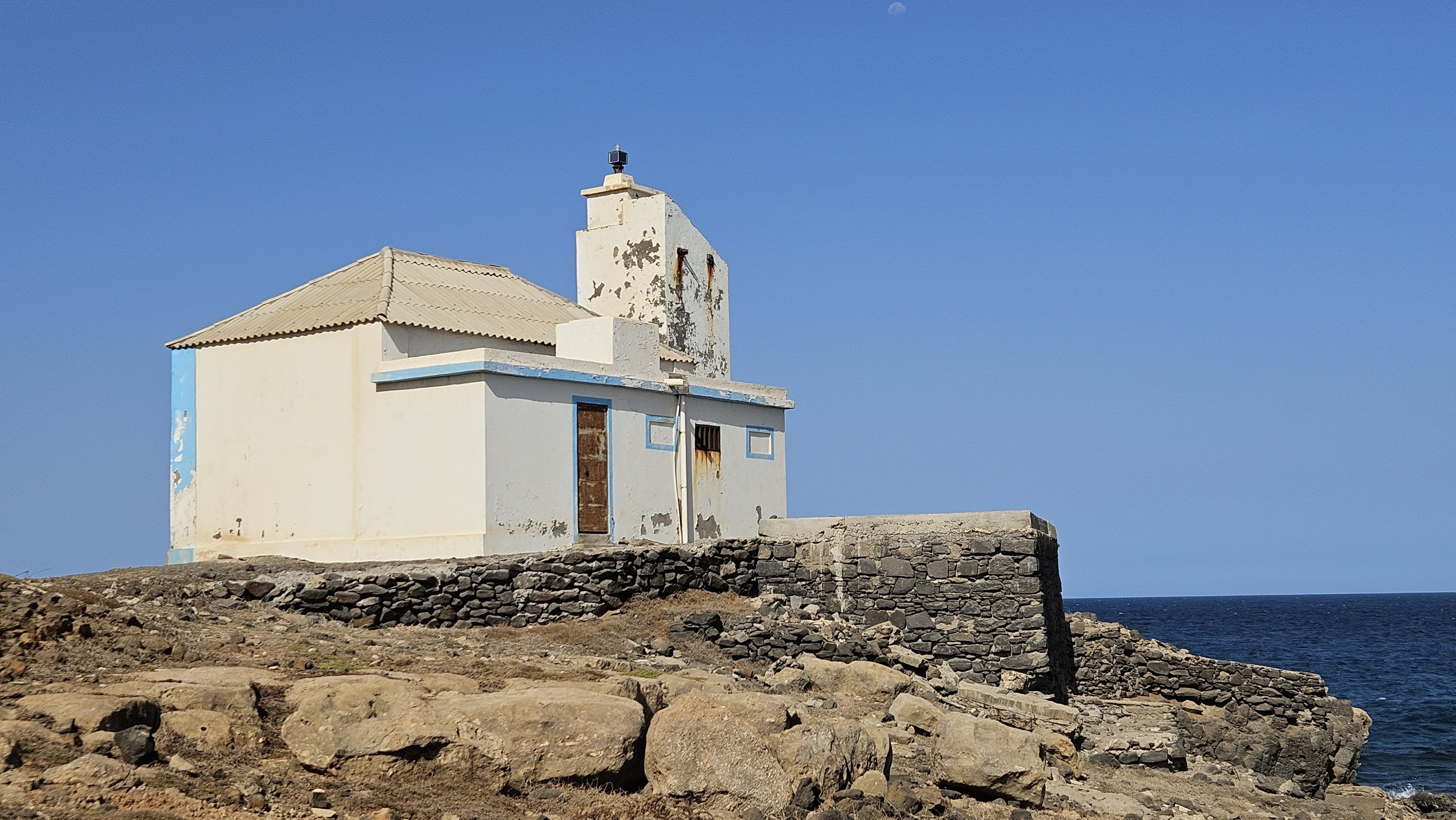
- Location: Ponta do Lobo, Santiago, São Domingos, Cape Verde
- Coordinates: 14°59′14″N 23°25′49″W

Tower
- Constructed: 1887
- Foundation: masonry base
- Construction: masonry tower
- Height: 9 m (30 ft)
- Shape: trapezoidal tower attached to 1-storey keeper’s house
- Markings: unpainted tower
- Power source: solar power

Light
- First lit: 2004
- Focal height: 17 m (56 ft)
- Range: 6 nmi (11 km; 6.9 mi)
- Characteristic: Fl(4) W 15s
- Cape Verde no.: PT-2125

Ponta do Lobo Lighthouse (Portuguese: Farol de Ponta do Lobo) is a lighthouse located near the headland named Ponta do Lobo, in the southeastern part of the island of Santiago, Cape Verde. The lighthouse is located about 4 km east of the nearest village, Vale da Custa, and 11 km northeast of the capital Praia. The lighthouse was built in 1887 and is the island's second oldest. It is a 9 metres high trapezoidal tower, attached to a single storey keeper's house. Its class of light is Fl (4) W 15s., its focal height is at 17 meters above sea level and its range is 10 nautical miles (19 km; 12 mi).

== See also ==
- List of lighthouses in Cape Verde
