= Água de Gato =

- Settlement
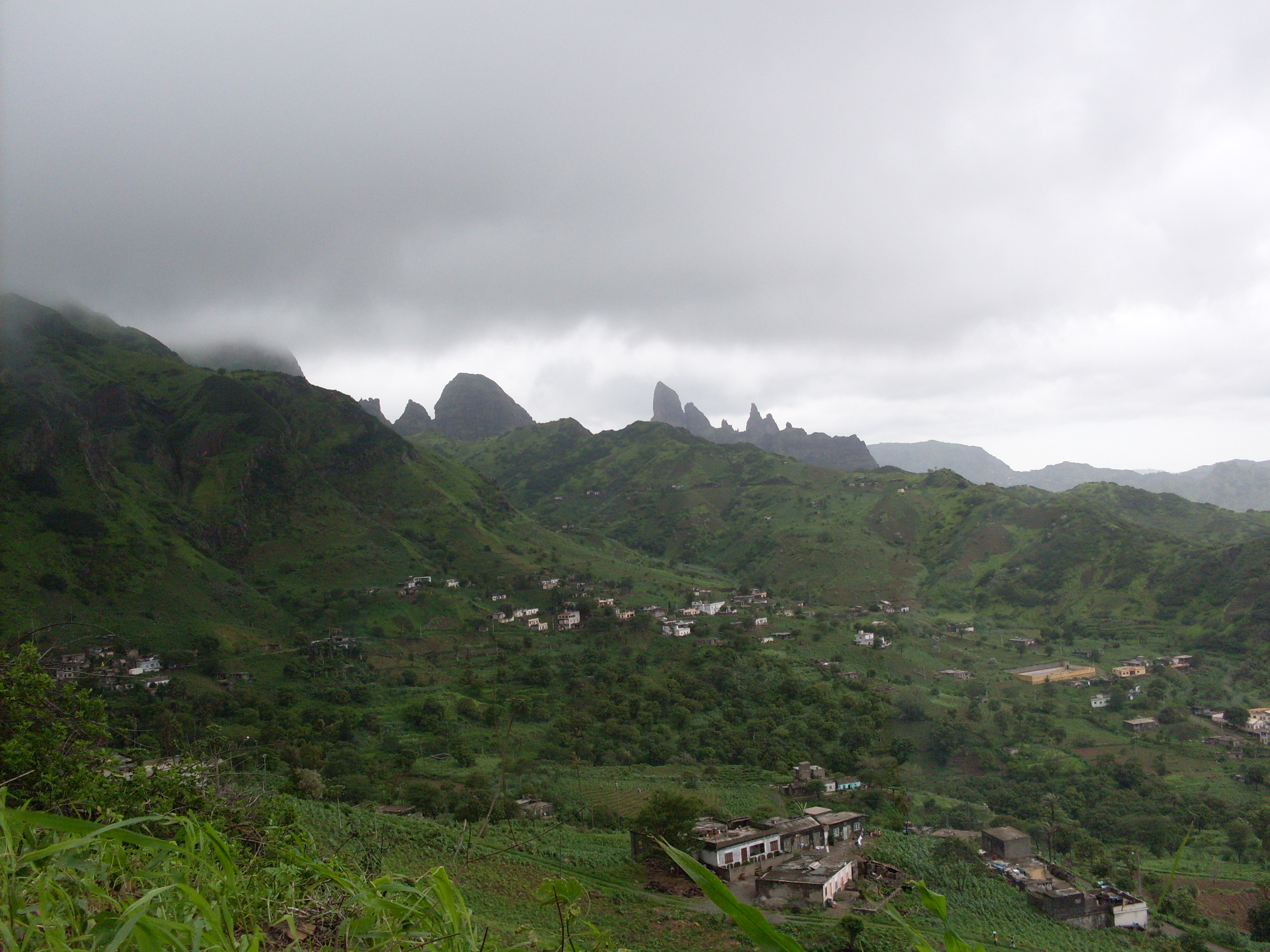
- View over the Ribeira de São Domingos, from Água de Gato

- Location within Cape Verde
- Coordinates: 15.034°N 23.582°W
- Country: Cape Verde
- Island: Santiago
- Municipality: São Domingos
- Civil parish: São Nicolau Tolentino
- Elevation: 400 m (1,300 ft)

Population (2010)
  - Total: 957
- ID: 75202

Água de Gato is a settlement in the central part of the island of Santiago, Cape Verde. In 2010 its population was 957. It is situated at about 400 m elevation, 2 km northwest of São Domingos and 2 km east of Rui Vaz.
