= Chaminé =

- Settlement
- Coordinates: 15.033°N 23.546°W
- Country: Cape Verde
- Island: Santiago
- Municipality: São Domingos
- Civil parish: São Nicolau Tolentino

Population (2010)
  - Total: 79
- ID: 75204

Chaminé is a village in the southeastern part of the island of Santiago, Cape Verde in the Atlantic Ocean. In 2010 its population was 79. It is located 2 km east of São Domingos. It is part of the municipality of São Domingos. Singer Codé di Dona was native to Chaminé.
