= Banana, Cape Verde =

Banana
- Settlement
- Coordinates: 15.050°N 23.555°W
- Country: Cape Verde
- Island: Santiago
- Municipality: São Domingos
- Civil parish: São Nicolau Tolentino

Population (2010)
  - Total: 180
- ID: 75203

Banana is a settlement in the central part of the island of Santiago, Cape Verde. It is situated 3 km northeast of São Domingos.
