= Moia Moia =

- Settlement
- Coordinates: 15.0203°N 23.4471°W
- Country: Cape Verde
- Island: Santiago
- Municipality: São Domingos
- Civil parish: Nossa Senhora da Luz

Population (2010)
  - Total: 205
- ID: 7510206

Moia Moia is a settlement in the eastern part of the island of Santiago, Cape Verde. It is part of the municipality of São Domingos. In 2010 its population was 205. It is situated near the east coast, 2 km southeast of Baía, 5 km northeast of Vale da Custa and 14 km northeast of Praia. It sits at an elevation of about 20 meters.
