= Ponta do Lobo =

Headland in Cape Verde

- Headland
- Cape Verde
- Coordinates: 14°59′14″N 23°25′48″W
- Location: Eastern Santiago, Cape Verde
- Offshore water bodies: Atlantic Ocean

Ponta do Lobo is a headland in the southeastern part of the island of Santiago, Cape Verde. It is in the municipality of São Domingos, 4 km east of Vale da Custa, 4 km southeast of Moia Moia and 11 km northeast of Praia. The nearby bay Porto Lobo was mentioned as P. Lobo on the 1747 map by Jacques-Nicolas Bellin. The Ponta do Lobo Lighthouse stands on the headland.
