= Longueira =

Longueira may refer to:

== Places ==
- Achada Longueira, a settlement in Cape Verde
- Longueira, Cape Verde, a village in Cape Verde
- Longueira / Almograve, a civil parish in Portugal

== People ==
- Pablo Longueira, a Chilean politician and industrial civil engineer
