= Fazenda (disambiguation) =

Fazenda is a type of plantation in colonial Brazil.

Fazenda may also refer to:

- Fazenda (Lajes das Flores), a parish in the Azores
- Fazenda, Cape Verde, a settlement in Cabo Verde
- Fazenda, Praia, a subdivision of Praia, Cabo Verde
- "(Ministry of) Fazenda", former name of:
  - Ministry of the Economy (Brazil)
  - Ministry of Finance (Portugal)
- Louise Fazenda, American film actress

== See also ==
- A Fazenda, a Brazilian reality TV show
