= Figueira Muita =

- Settlement
- Coordinates: 15.2081°N 23.7407°W
- Country: Cape Verde
- Island: Santiago
- Municipality: Tarrafal
- Civil parish: Santo Amaro Abade

Population (2010)
  - Total: 160
- ID: 71111

Figueira Muita is a settlement in the northern part of the island of Santiago, Cape Verde. It is part of the municipality of Tarrafal. In 2010, its population was 160. It is located about 2 km south of Ribeira da Prata and 8 km south of Tarrafal.
