= Monte Trigo =

- Settlement
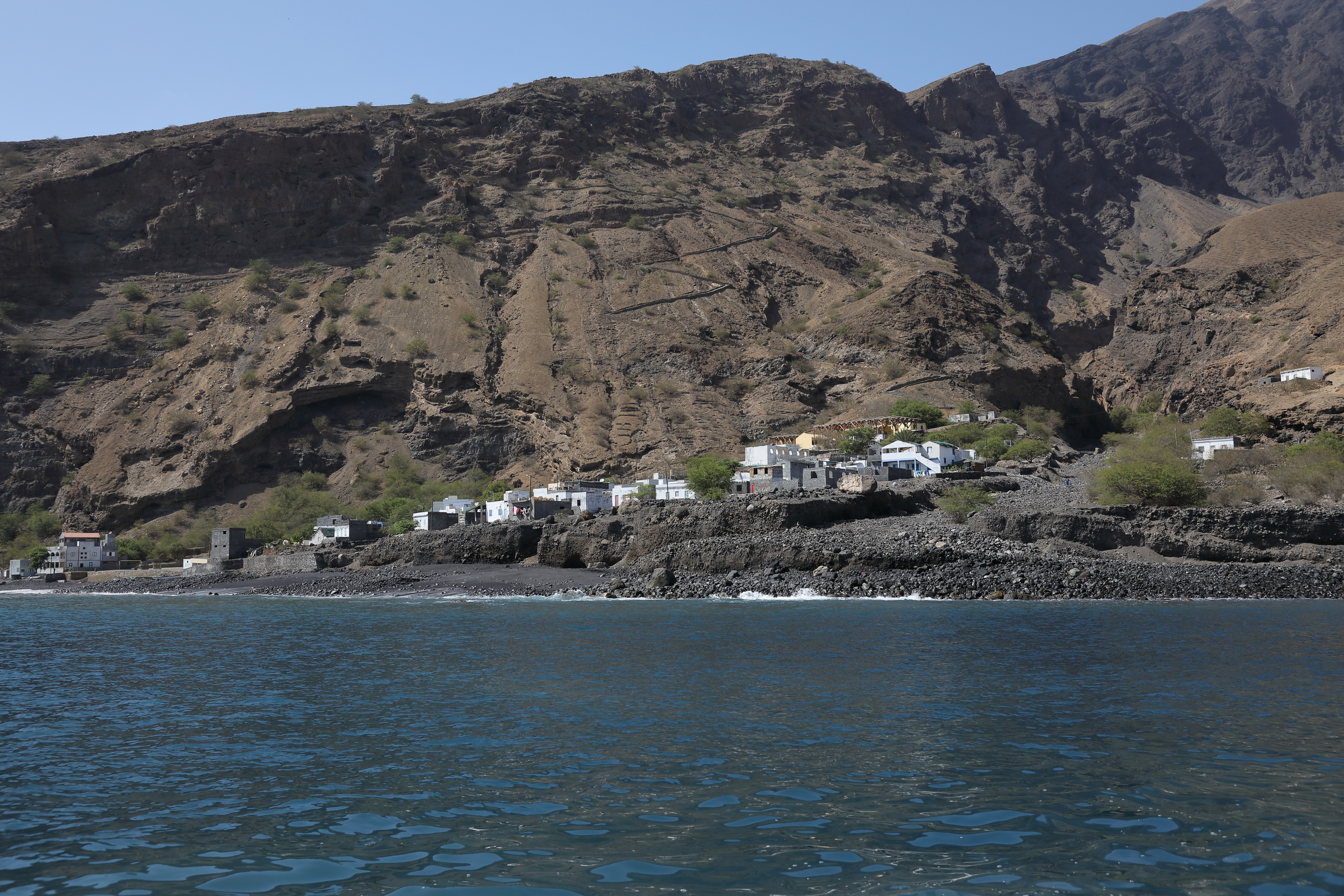

- Location within Cape Verde
- Coordinates: 17.021°N 25.331°W
- Country: Cape Verde
- Island: Santo Antão
- Municipality: Porto Novo
- Civil parish: Santo André
- Elevation: 2 m (6.6 ft)

Population (2010)
  - Total: 274
- ID: 13206

Monte Trigo is the westernmost settlement on the island of Santo Antão, Cape Verde. It is situated on the coast, at the foot of the Tope de Coroa, the highest mountain of the island. It is 28 km west of the island capital Porto Novo. In 2010 its population was 274. About 5 km to the northwest is Ponta do Chão de Mangrade, the westernmost point of all Africa (together with the mainland and its islands).

== See also ==
- List of villages and settlements in Cape Verde
