= Achada Tenda =

- Settlement
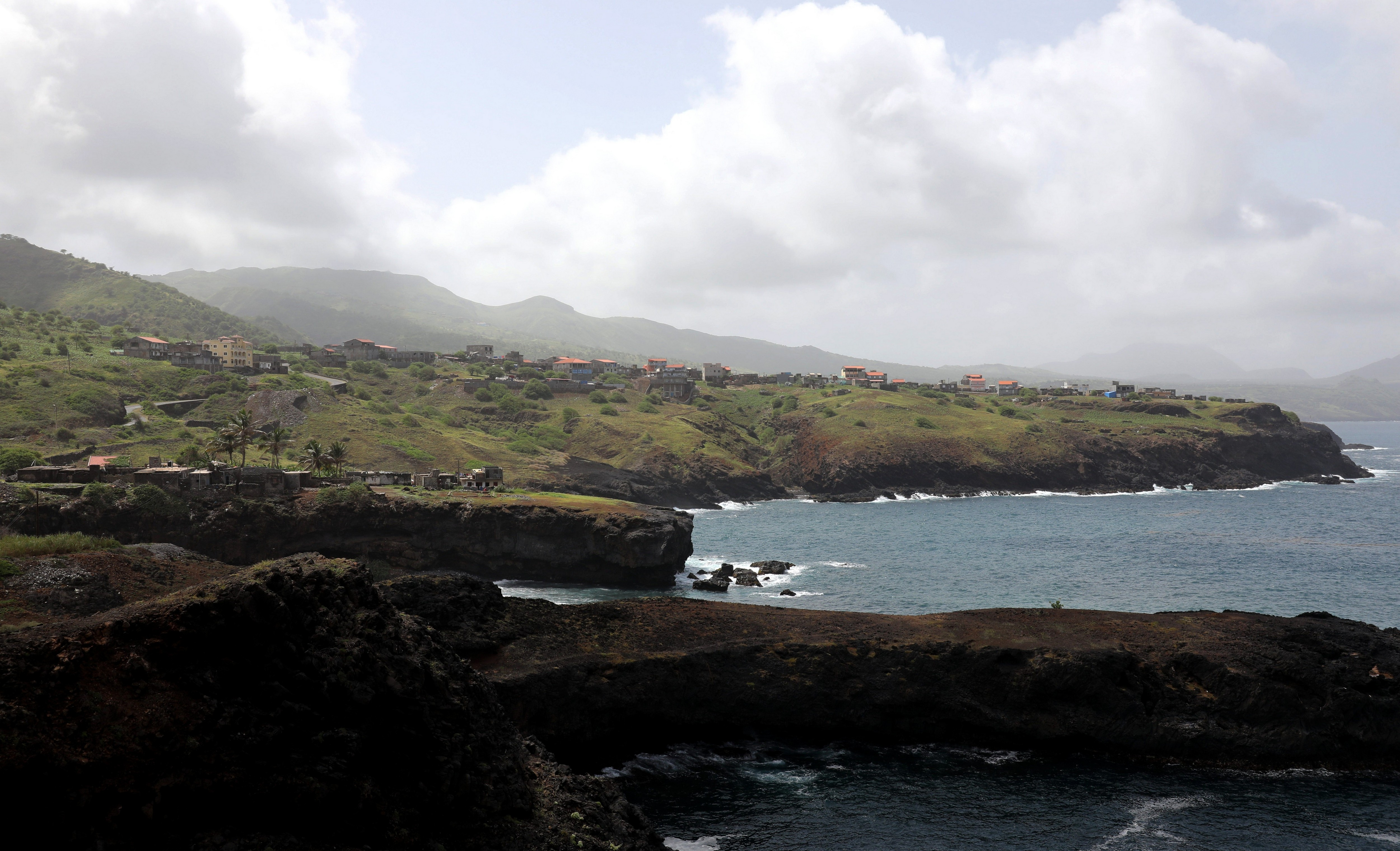

- Location within Cape Verde
- Coordinates: 15.248°N 23.664°W
- Country: Cape Verde
- Island: Santiago
- Municipality: Tarrafal
- Civil parish: Santo Amaro Abade

Population (2010)
  - Total: 1,242
- ID: 71106

Achada Tenda is a town in the northern part of the island of Santiago, Cape Verde. In 2010 its population was 1,242. It is situated on the east coast, 10 km southeast of Tarrafal. The small bay Porto Formoso is situated near the town.
