= Nossa Senhora da Luz (São Domingos) =

- Civil parish
- Coordinates: 15.02°N 23.48°W
- Country: Cape Verde
- Island: Santiago
- Municipality: São Domingos

Population (2010)
  - Total: 4,898
- ID: 751

Nossa Senhora da Luz (Portuguese for Our Lady of Light) is a freguesia (civil parish) of Cape Verde. It covers the eastern part of the municipality of São Domingos, on the island of Santiago.

== Subdivisions ==
The freguesia consists of the following settlements (population at the 2010 census):

- Achada Baleia (pop: 376)
- Achada Lama (pop: 184)
- Baía (pop: 489)
- Cancelo (pop: 238)
- Capela (pop: 170)
- Chão de Coqueiro (pop: 256)
- Dobe (pop: 196)
- Milho Branco (pop: 607)
- Moia Moia (pop: 205)
- Portal (pop: 135)
- Praia Baixo (pop: 952)
- Praia Formosa (pop: 712)
- Vale da Custa (pop: 378)

== See also ==
- Administrative divisions of Cape Verde
