= Ponta do Chão de Mangrade =

Westernmost point of Cape Verde and of Africa

Ponta do Chão de Mangrade Ponta de Mangrade
- Headland
- Coordinates: 17°03′11″N 25°21′40″W
- Location: Western Santo Antão, Cape Verde
- Offshore water bodies: Atlantic Ocean

Ponta do Chão de Mangrade (also: Ponta de Mangrade, Ponta Oeste) is the westernmost point of the Island of Santo Antão, and also the westernmost point of Cape Verde and all Africa. It is located 5 km northwest of Monte Trigo and 31 km west of Porto Novo, in a very remote area. The 1494 Treaty of Tordesillas divided the newly discovered lands outside Europe between Portugal and Spain along a meridian 370 leagues (2,193 km) west of this point.

== Ponta de Mangrade Lighthouse ==
Ponta de Mangrade Lighthouse Farol da Ponta de Mangrade Ponta Oeste
- Location: Ponta de Mangrade; Santo Antão; Cape Verde
- Coordinates: 17°03′14.4″N 25°21′25.8″W

Tower
- Foundation: concrete base
- Construction: concrete tower
- Height: 3 metres (9.8 ft)
- Shape: cylindrical tower with lantern
- Markings: white tower, red lantern
- Power source: solar power

Light
- Focal height: 112 metres (367 ft)
- Range: 13 nautical miles (24 km; 15 mi)
- Characteristic: Fl (2) W 10s.
- Cape Verde no.: PT-2013

There is a lighthouse on the headland, consisting of a 3 m high white concrete tower with a red lantern. Its focal height is 112 m, and its range is 13 nautical miles (24 km; 15 mi).

== See also ==
- List of lighthouses in Cape Verde
- Geography of Cape Verde
