= Milho Branco (Tarrafal) =

- Settlement
- Coordinates: 15.2376°N 23.7283°W
- Country: Cape Verde
- Island: Santiago
- Municipality: Tarrafal
- Civil parish: Santo Amaro Abade

Population (2010)
  - Total: 165
- ID: 71115

Milho Branco is a settlement in the northern part of the island of Santiago, Cape Verde. It is part of the municipality of Tarrafal. In 2010 its population was 165. It is located about 5 km southeast of Tarrafal.
