= Carriçal =

- Settlement
- Coordinates: 16.554°N 24.081°W
- Country: Cape Verde
- Island: São Nicolau
- Municipality: Ribeira Brava
- Civil parish: Nossa Senhora do Rosário
- Elevation: 14 m (46 ft)

Population (2010)
  - Total: 190
- ID: 31208

Carriçal is a settlement in the eastern part of the island of São Nicolau, Cape Verde. It is situated on the south coast, 8 km southeast of Juncalinho and 24 km east of Ribeira Brava. It is the easternmost settlement on the island. Some 8 km east is the island's easternmost point, Ponta Leste. The place was mentioned as Currissal in the 1747 map by Jacques-Nicolas Bellin.

== See also ==
- List of villages and settlements in Cape Verde
