= Trás os Montes, Cape Verde =

Trás os Montes
- Settlement
- Coordinates: 15.294°N 23.714°W
- Country: Cape Verde
- Island: Santiago
- Municipality: Tarrafal
- Civil parish: Santo Amaro Abade

Population (2010)
  - Total: 464
- ID: 71119

Trás os Montes is a settlement in the northern part of the island of Santiago, Cape Verde. In 2010 its population was 464. It is situated 4 km northeast of Tarrafal.
