= Tope de Coroa =

Mountain in Cape Verde

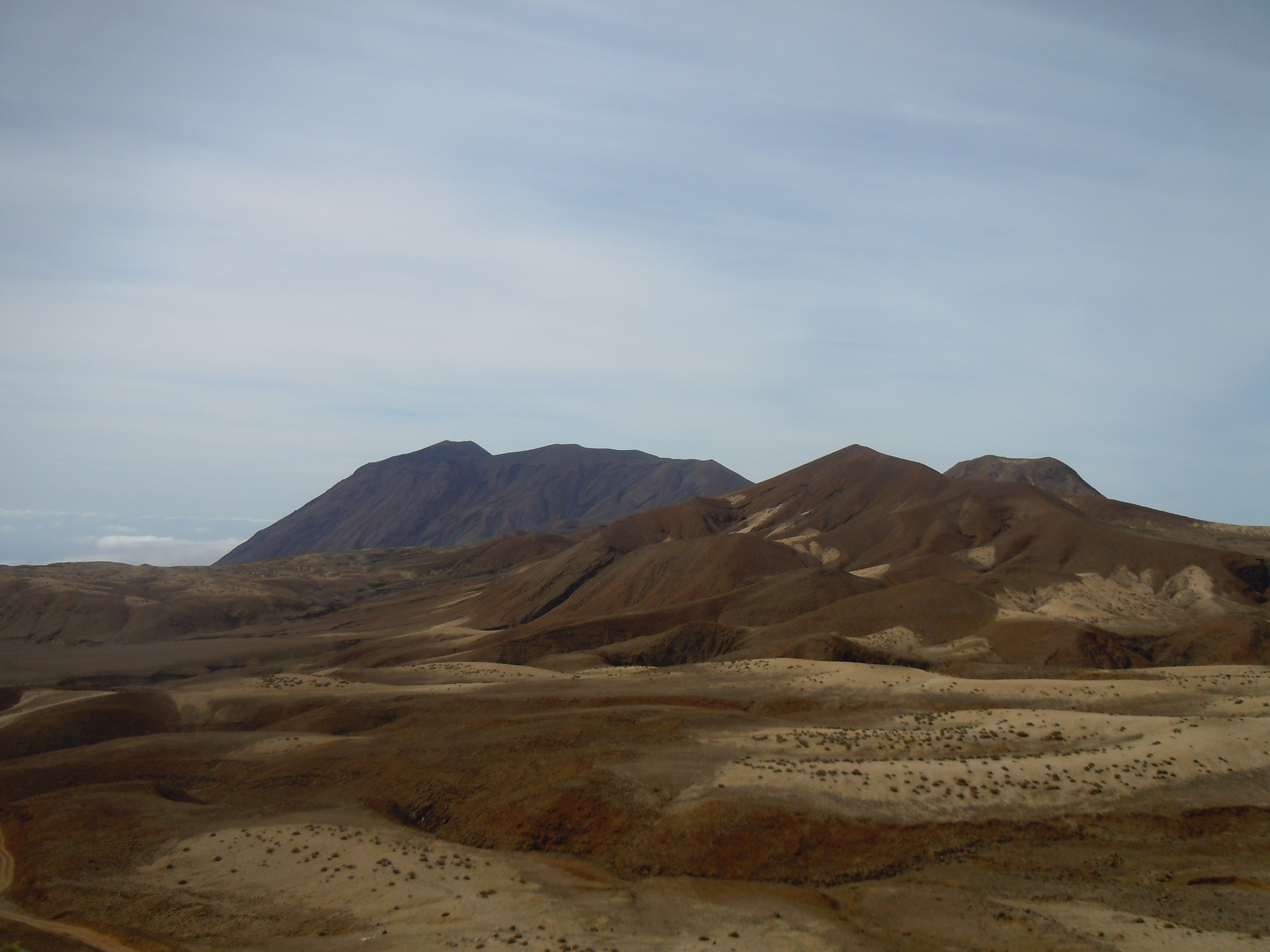
- View of the mountain summit (in the background)

Highest point
- Elevation: 1,979 m (6,493 ft)
- Prominence: 1,979 m (6,493 ft)
- Listing: Ultra
- Coordinates: 17°01′57″N 25°17′45″W

Geography
- Location within Cape Verde
- Location: Santo Antão, Cape Verde

Geology
- Mountain type: Stratovolcano
- Last eruption: around 200,000 years ago

Tope de Coroa is a mountain on the island of Santo Antão's, Cape Verde, Africa. At 1,979 m elevation, it is the highest point of the island. It is in the western part of the island, 25 km west of the island capital Porto Novo. The mountain is entirely of volcanic origin. The area is the source of several streams including Ribeira de Monte Trigo which flows westward to Monte Trigo.

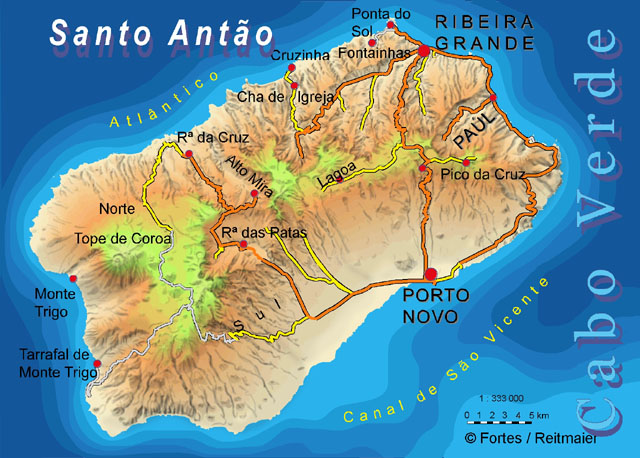
Map of the island of Santo Antão with Tope de Coroa on the left

The mountain forms part of a natural park, covering 84.92 km^{2} (32.79 sq mi). It contains 61% of the endemic angiosperm plants of Cape Verde, of which 25% are in the red list of endangered species, including Periploca laevigata subsp. chevalieri. Free grazing is a threat to the biodiversity of the area. Tope de Coroa consists of relatively young volcanic rock, formed between 200,000 and 170,000 years ago.

== See also ==
- List of mountains in Cape Verde
- List of Ultras of Africa
