= Vale da Custa =

- Settlement
- Coordinates: 14.9873°N 23.4703°W
- Country: Cape Verde
- Island: Santiago
- Municipality: São Domingos
- Civil parish: Nossa Senhora da Luz

Population (2010)
  - Total: 378
- ID: 75110

Vale da Custa is a village in the southeastern part of the island of Santiago, Cape Verde. It is situated 2 km northwest of São Francisco Bay, 6 km southeast of Ribeirão Chiqueiro and 9 kilometres (6 miles) northeast of the capital Praia. It is part of the municipality of São Domingos and the parish of Nossa Senhora da Luz. In 2010 its population was 378.

== Geography ==
The Ponta do Lobo Lighthouse lies 4 km to the east of the village, on the promontory Ponta do Lobo, near the island's easternmost point.

Vale da Custa was the first village in Cape Verde to have a rural electrification with a micro-grid hybrid power, photovoltaic and wind. The small power plant was started up in September 2012. the opening ceremony was presided over by Cape Verde Prime Minister, Mr Jose Maria Neves, and the Canary Island (Spain) President, Mr Paulino Rivero. Canary Island development cooperation supported the project.
