= Preguiça Lighthouse =

- Location: Preguiça; São Nicolau; Cape Verde
- Coordinates: 16°33′42.06″N 24°17′6.11″W

Tower
- Constructed: 1890
- Construction: masonry hut
- Height: 7 metres (23 ft)
- Markings: white hut
- Power source: solar power

Light
- Focal height: 25 metres (82 ft)
- Range: 5 nautical miles (9.3 km; 5.8 mi)
- Characteristic: Fl (2+1) R 15s.

The Preguiça Lighthouse (Portuguese: Farol da Preguiça) is a lighthouse located near the shore of Baía de São Jorge in Preguiça on the island of São Nicolau in northern Cape Verde. It is a masonry structure painted white. The lighthouse sits about 18 meters above sea level, is seven meters tall, and has a focal height of 25 meters above sea level. Its focal range is 5 nautical miles (9.3 km; 5.8 mi). Its characteristic is Fl (2+1) R 15s.

== See also ==
- List of lighthouses in Cape Verde
