= Ponta do Sol (Santo Antão promontory) =

- Headland
- Coordinates: 17°12′19″N 25°05′32″W
- Location: Northern Santo Antão, Cape Verde
- Offshore water bodies: Atlantic Ocean

Ponta do Sol is the northernmost point of both Cape Verde and the Island of Santo Antão. It is located 300 meters north of the city center of Ponta do Sol. The former Agostinho Neto Airport was located on the headland.

== Ponta do Sol Lighthouse ==
Ponta do Sol Lighthouse Farol da Ponta do Sol
- Location: Ponta do Sol; Santo Antão; Cape Verde
- Coordinates: 17°12′14.9″N 25°5′22.6″W

Tower
- Foundation: concrete base
- Construction: metal post
- Height: 10 metres (33 ft)
- Shape: cylindrical post with balcony and light atop
- Markings: white and red horizontal bands
- Power source: solar power

Light
- Focal height: 15 metres (49 ft)
- Range: 9 nautical miles (17 km; 10 mi)
- Characteristic: Fl W 4s.
- Cape Verde no.: PT-2004

The lighthouse at the far end of the headland (Portuguese: Farol de Ponta do Sol) is a metal post with a square gallery. It is painted with white and red horizontal bands.

== See also ==
- List of lighthouses in Cape Verde
- Geography of Cape Verde
