= São Nicolau Tolentino (São Domingos) =

- Civil parish
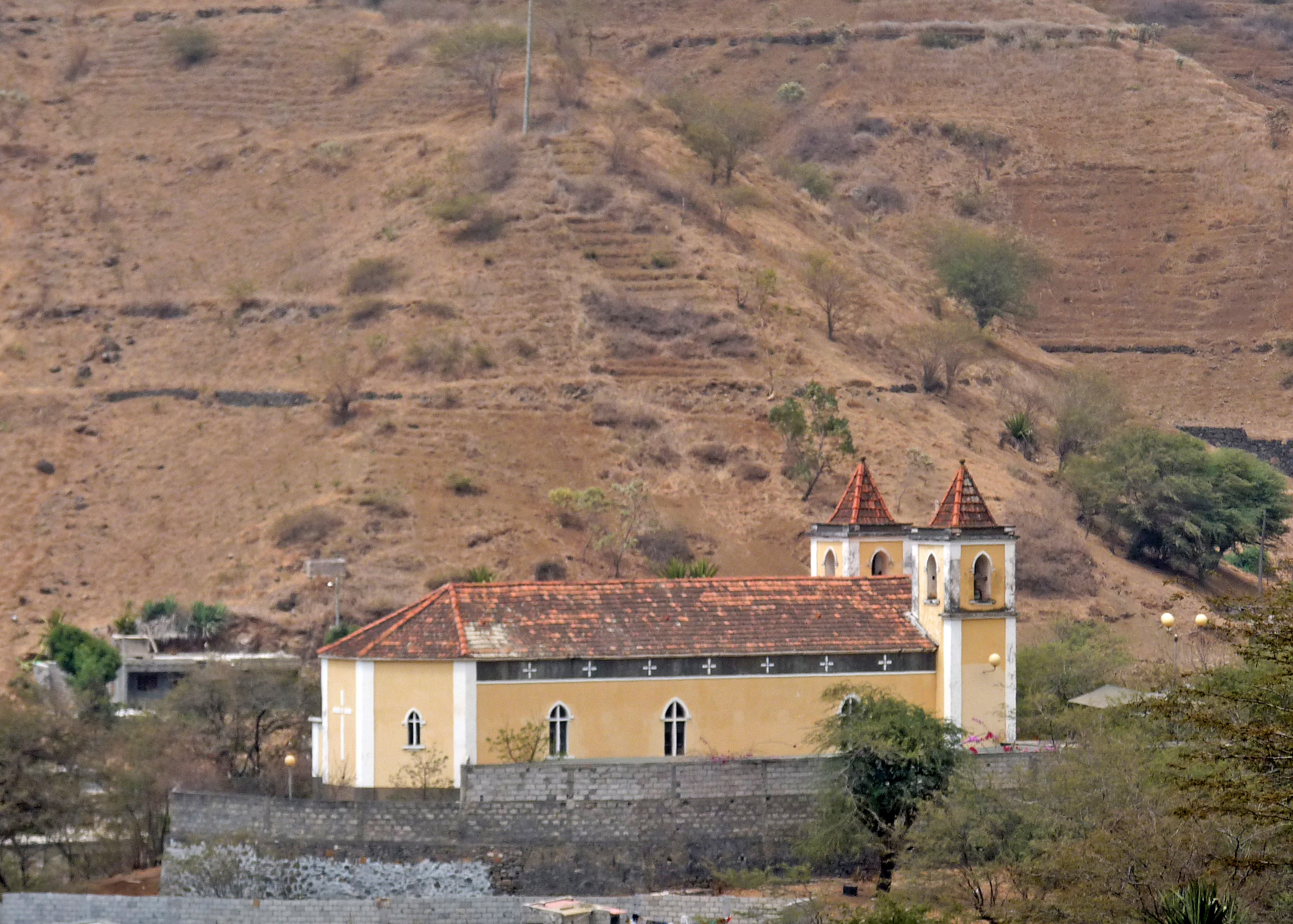
- São Nicolau Tolentino church, seat of the parish

- Location within Cape Verde
- Coordinates: 15.01°N 23.57°W
- Country: Cape Verde
- Island: Santiago
- Municipality: São Domingos

Population (2010)
  - Total: 8,801
- ID: 752

São Nicolau Tolentino (Portuguese for Saint Nicholas of Tolentino) is a freguesia (civil parish) of Cape Verde. It covers the western part of the municipality of São Domingos, on the island of Santiago.

== Subdivision ==
The freguesia consists of the following settlements (population at the 2010 census):

- Achada Loura (pop: 89)
- Achada Mitra (pop: 106)
- Água de Gato (pop: 957)
- Banana (pop: 180)
- Chamine (pop: 79)
- Dacabalaio (pop: 47)
- Fontes Almeida (pop: 745)
- Gudim (pop: 362)
- Lagoa (pop: 390)
- Mato Afonso (pop: 327)
- Mendes Faleiro Cabral (pop: 86)
- Mendes Faleiro Rendeiro (pop: 117)
- Nora (pop: 323)
- Pó de Saco (pop: 174)
- Ribeirão Chiqueiro (pop: 773)
- Robão Cal (pop: 149)
- Rui Vaz (pop: 1,078)
- São Domingos (also: Várzea da Igreja, pop: 2,818, city)
- Veneza (pop: 1)

== See also ==
- Administrative divisions of Cape Verde
