= Ponta Leste =

Headland in Cape Verde

- Headland
- Coordinates: 16°34′12″N 24°00′29″W
- Location: Eastern São Nicolau, Cape Verde near Carriçal
- Offshore water bodies: Atlantic Ocean
- Ponta Leste Lighthouse; Ponta Calheta
- Coordinates: 16°34′9″N 24°0′37″W
- Foundation: concrete base
- Height: 3 metres (9.8 ft)
- Shape: white column with red lantern
- Power source: solar power
- Focal height: 73 metres (240 ft)
- Range: 11 nautical miles (20 km; 13 mi)
- Characteristic: Fl (4) W 10s.
- Cape Verde no.: PT-2050

Ponta Leste (also: Ponta Calheta) is the easternmost point of the island of São Nicolau, Cape Verde. It is 8 km east of Carriçal and 30 km east of Ribeira Brava. The point was mentioned in a map in a 1747 atlas collection by Jacques-Nicolas Bellin as "Oost-Hoek" (Dutch), "Pointe de l'Est" (French"). It was sometimes known as East Point in English.

== Lighthouse ==
There is a lighthouse on the headland, focal height 73 metres, range 11 nautical miles (20 km; 13 mi).

== See also ==
- List of lighthouses in Cape Verde
