= Dona Amélia Lighthouse =

Farol de Dona Amélia Ponta Machado
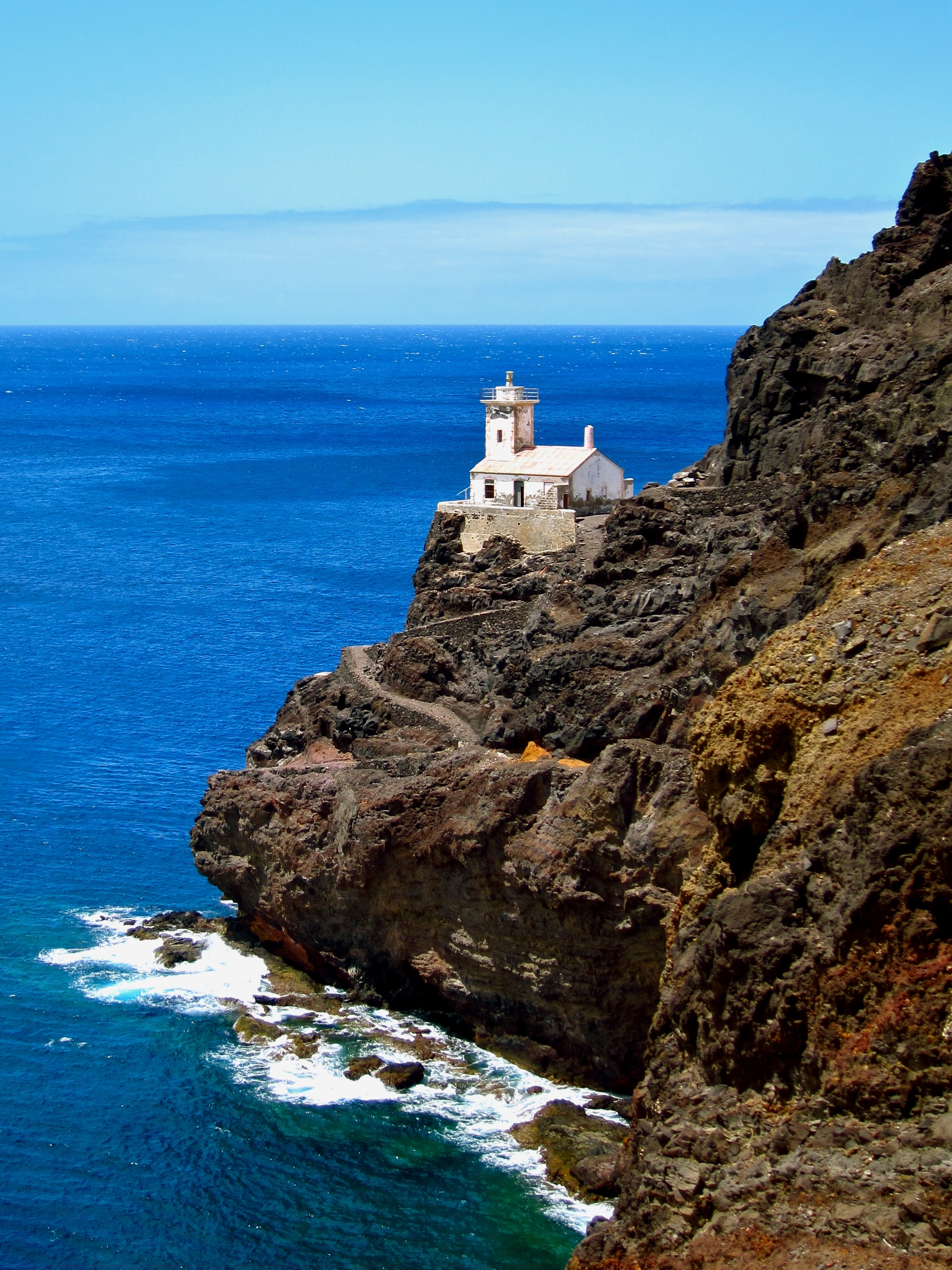
- Location: near São Pedro; São Vicente; Cape Verde
- Coordinates: 16°49′35.7″N 25°05′06.9″W

Tower
- Constructed: 1894
- Construction: masonry tower
- Height: 14 metres (46 ft)
- Shape: square tower with balcony and lantern rising from one-story keeper's house
- Markings: white tower

Light
- Focal height: 56 metres (184 ft)
- Range: 17 nautical miles (31 km; 20 mi)
- Characteristic: Fl W 5s.
- Cape Verde no.: PT-2020

Farol de D. Amélia (also: farol da ponta Machado, Ponta Machado Lighthouse) is a lighthouse in the southwestern point of the island of São Vicente in northwestern Cape Verde. It lies 3 km west of the village of São Pedro. The lighthouse is a white square tower with a lantern and a gallery, 14 m high. The lighthouse was completed in 1894.

== Light characteristics ==
- Characteristics: Light: 0.2s, occlusion: 4.8s, visible: 302°—172° (230°).

== See also ==
- List of lighthouses in Cape Verde
- List of buildings and structures in São Vicente, Cape Verde
