= Fontes Pereira de Melo Lighthouse =

Farol de Fontes Pereira de Melo Ponta de Tumbo
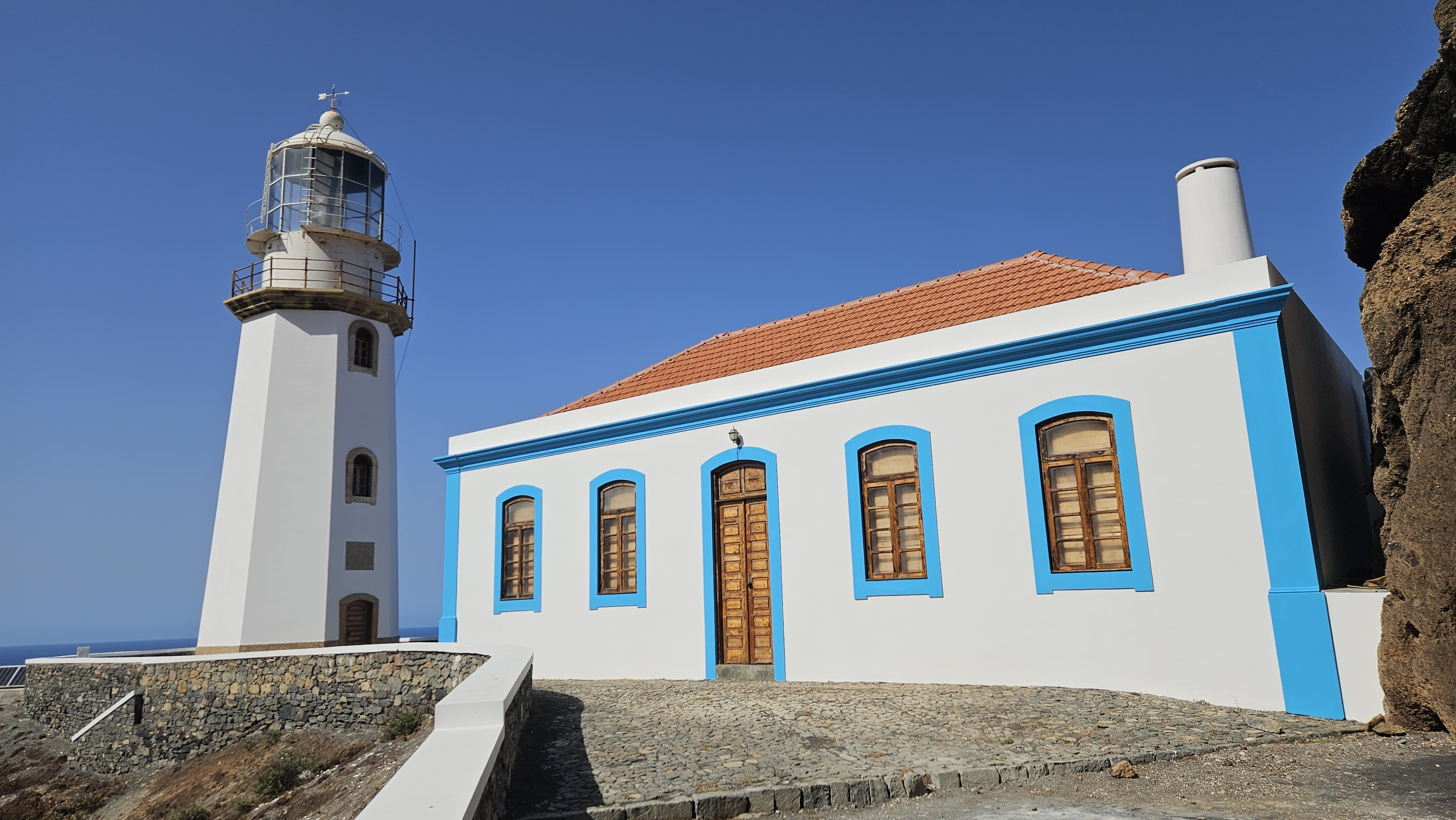
- Location: Janela; Santo Antão; Cape Verde
- Coordinates: 17°6′51.7″N 24°58′12.8″W

Tower
- Constructed: 1886
- Construction: masonry tower
- Height: 16 metres (52 ft)
- Shape: octagonal tower with balcony and gallery
- Markings: white tower and lantern

Light
- First lit: 1886
- Deactivated: 2006
- Focal height: 162 metres (531 ft)
- Range: 17 nautical miles (31 km; 20 mi)
- Characteristic: Fl (4) W 20s.
- Cape Verde no.: 2008

Farol de Fontes Pereira de Melo (also: farol da ponta de Tumbo) is a lighthouse at the northeastern point of the island of Santo Antão in northwestern Cape Verde. It is situated on the headland Ponta de Tumbo, 2 km east of Janela, 6 km southeast of Pombas and 15 km northeast of Porto Novo. The lighthouse was named after Fontes Pereira de Melo, prime minister of Portugal for several times between 1871 and 1886. It is a white octagonal masonry tower, 16 meters high. Its focal height is 162 meters above sea level, and its range is 17 nautical miles (31 km; 20 mi).

Between 2017 and 2019 the lighthouse and the adjacent building for the lighthouse keeper were renovated.

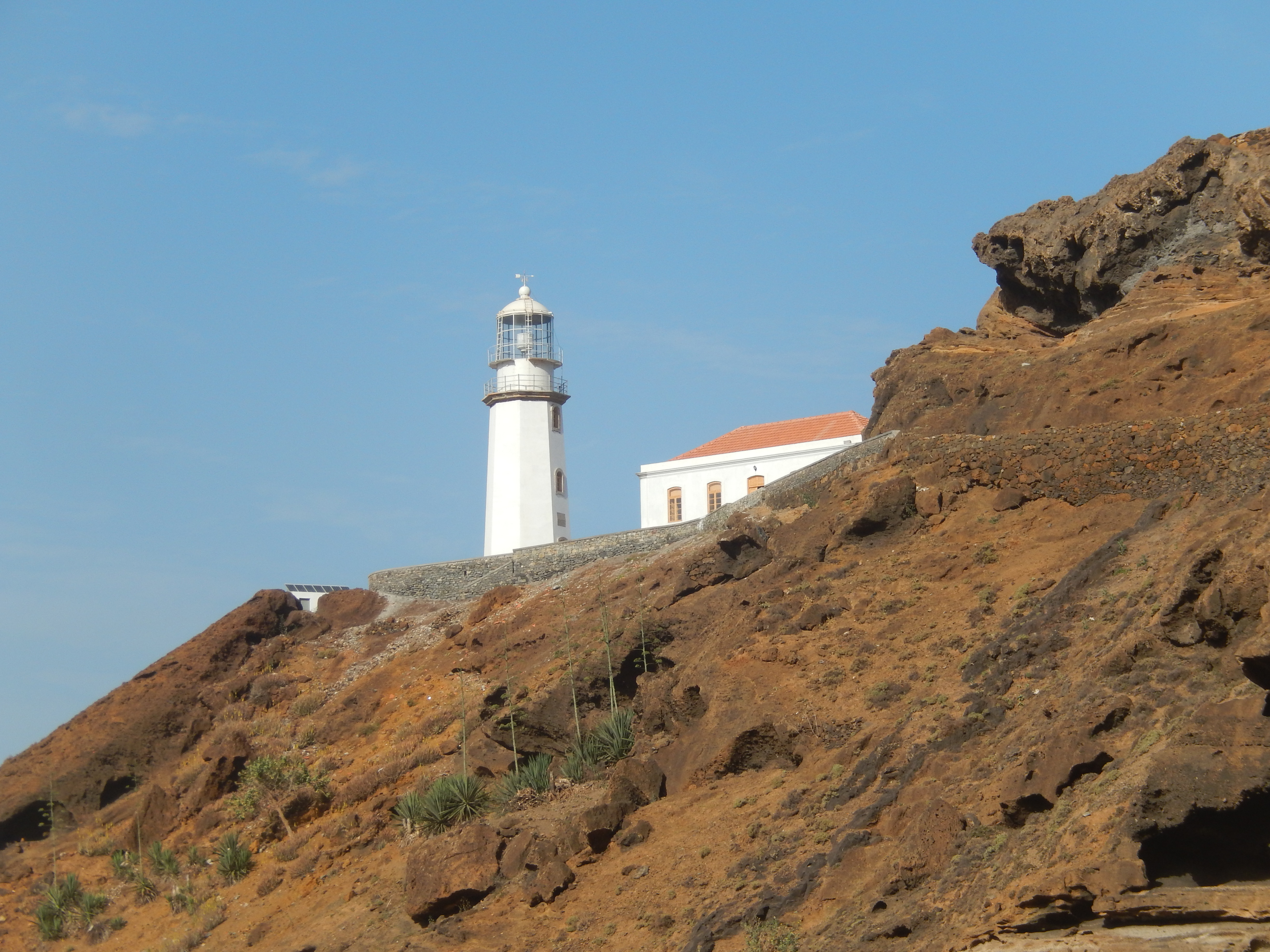
Lighthouse on Ponta de Tumba, February 2019

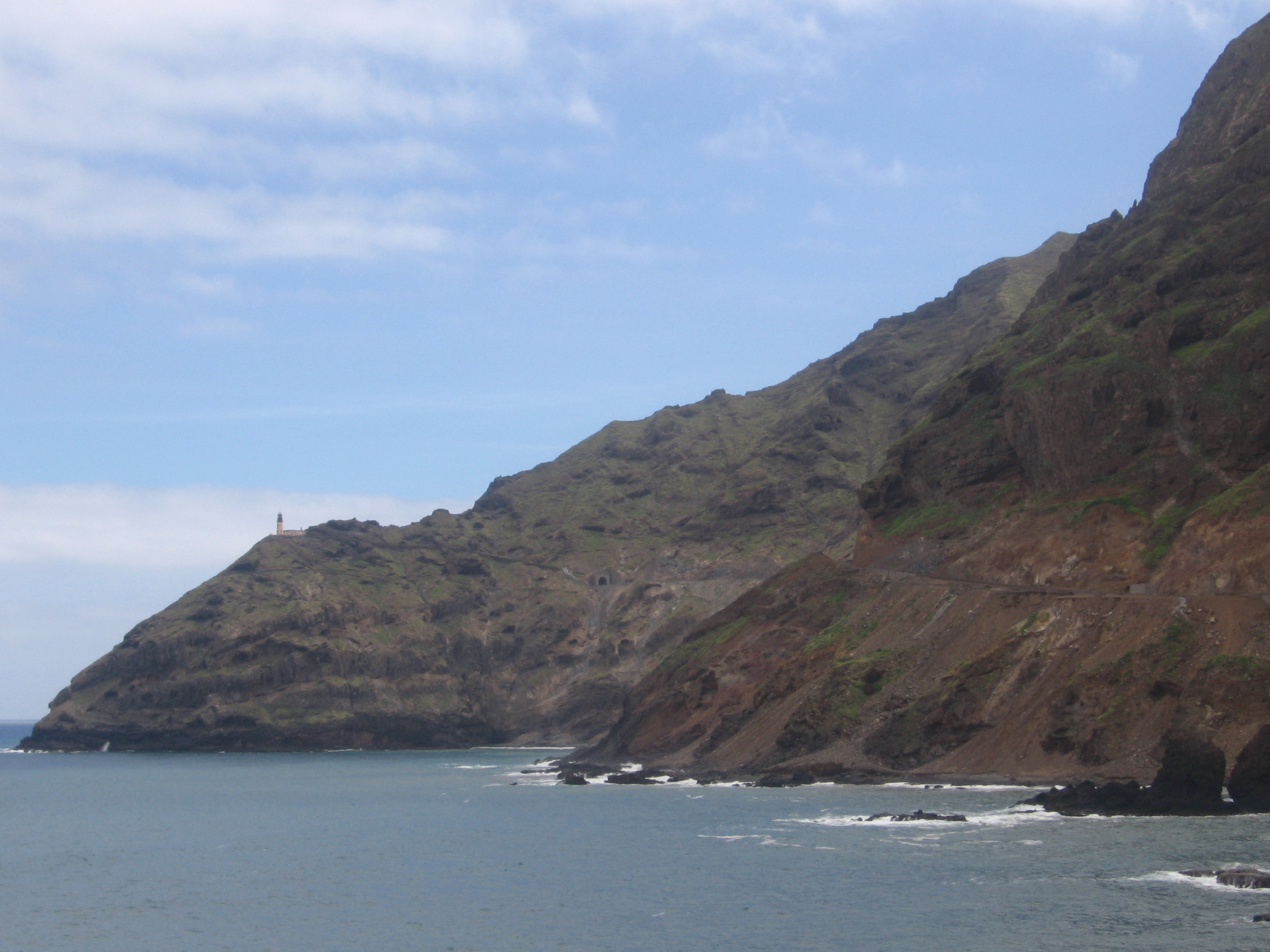
The lighthouse as seen from sea

== See also ==
- List of lighthouses in Cape Verde
