= Forte de São José (Maio) =

Fort in Cape Verde

- Porto Inglês, Maio Island in Cape Verde
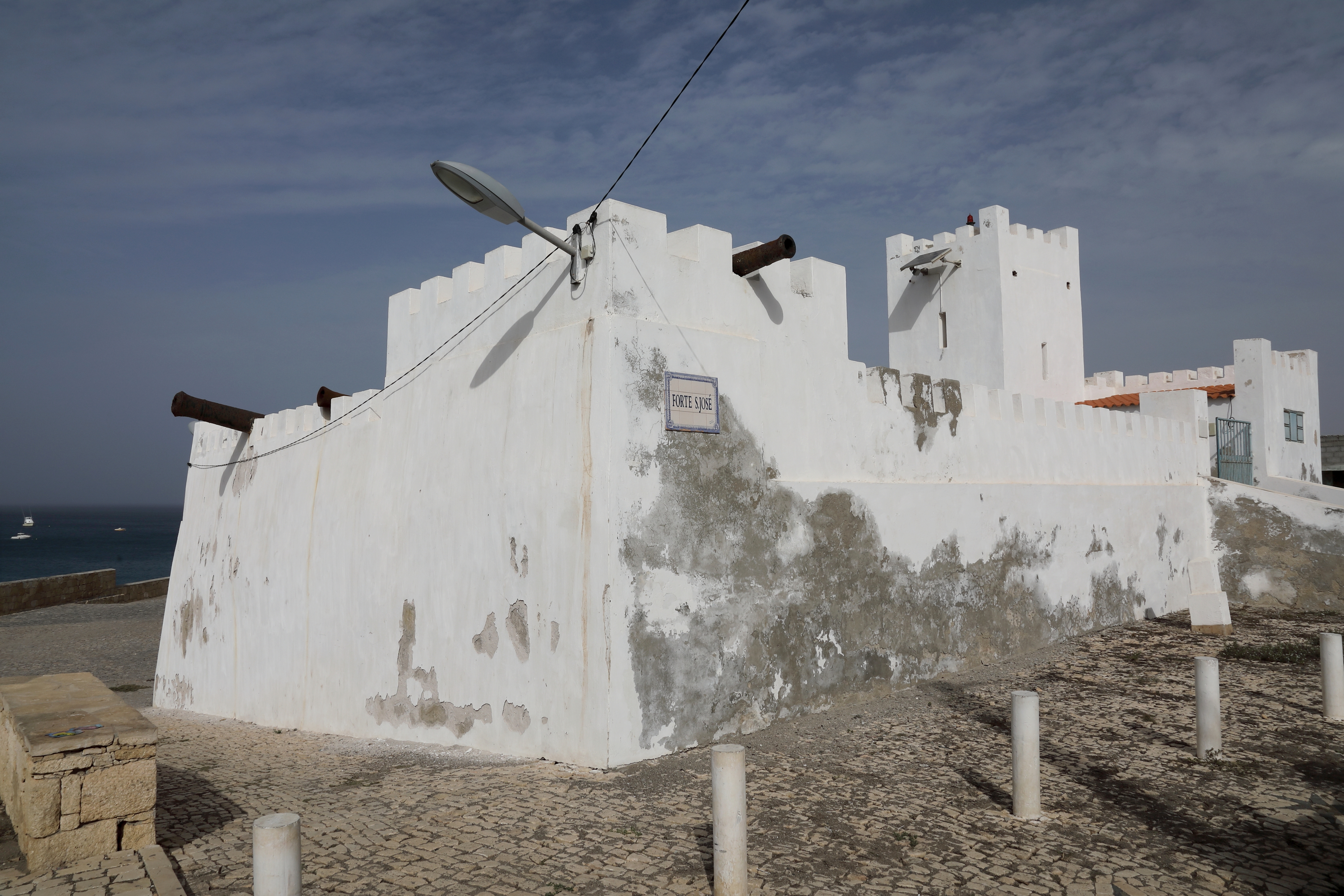

Site information
- Controlled by: Portuguese Empire
- Open to the public: Yes

Location
- Coordinates: 15.1365°N 23.2125°W

Site history
- Built: c. 1743
- Events: Battle of Maio (1814)
- Forte de São José Lighthouse
- Constructed: 1887
- Foundation: stone base
- Construction: stone tower
- Height: 18 m (59 ft)
- Shape: square tower with balcony and light
- Markings: white tower
- Power source: solar power
- Focal height: 22 m (72 ft)
- Range: 9 nautical miles (17 km; 10 mi)
- Characteristic: Fl(3) R 12s
- Cape Verde no.: PT-2115

Forte de São José (Portuguese for the Fort of Saint Joseph) is a fort located in the city of Porto Inglês in the southern part of Maio Island, Cape Verde. It was built by the Portuguese around 1743, in order to protect the town of Porto Inglês from pirate attacks. Today, the fort is one of the tourist attractions of the town.

== Forte de São José Lighthouse (Farol de Forte de São José) ==
A lighthouse was built in the fort in 1887. It is a stone tower painted white. The light is solar powered. It is 18 meters tall, sits at 4 meters above sea level and its focal height is 22 meters, its range is 17 km (9 nautical miles). Its characteristic is Fl (3) R 12s.

== See also ==
- List of lighthouses in Cape Verde
- Portuguese Empire
