= Ponta Cais =

Headland in Maio, Cape Verde

- Headland
- Coordinates: 15°20′16″N 23°10′48″W
- Location: Northern Maio, Cape Verde
- Offshore water bodies: Atlantic Ocean
- Farol da Ponta Cais
- Coordinates: 15°20′0″N 23°10′47″W
- Foundation: concrete base
- Construction: metal tower
- Height: 7 metres (23 ft)
- Power source: solar power
- Focal height: 14 metres (46 ft)
- Range: 10 nautical miles (19 km; 12 mi)
- Characteristic: Fl W 7s.
- Cape Verde no.: PT-2118

Ponta Cais is a headland and the northernmost point of the island of Maio, Cape Verde. It is about 8 km north of the nearest village, Cascabulho. There is a lighthouse on the headland.

== See also ==
- List of lighthouses in Cape Verde
