= Ponta do Barril =

- Headland
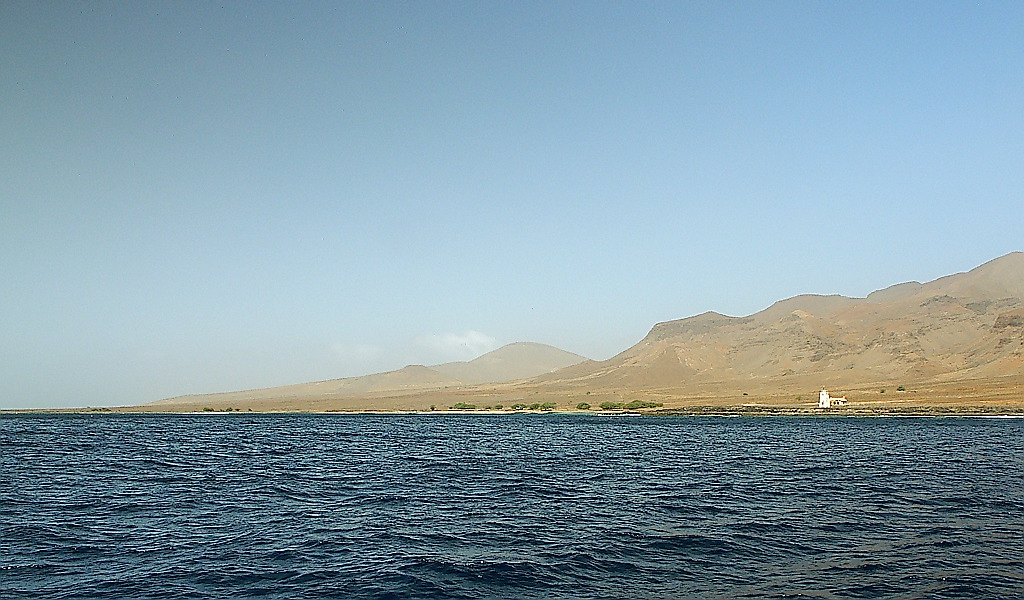
- Ponta do Barril and its lighthouse

- Coordinates: 16°36′23″N 24°25′07″W
- Location: Western São Nicolau, Cape Verde
- Offshore water bodies: Atlantic Ocean

Ponta do Barril is a headland in the western part of the island of São Nicolau, Cape Verde. It is about 8 km northwest of Tarrafal de São Nicolau and 5 km southwest of the nearest village Praia Branca.

== Lighthouse ==
Farol do Barril
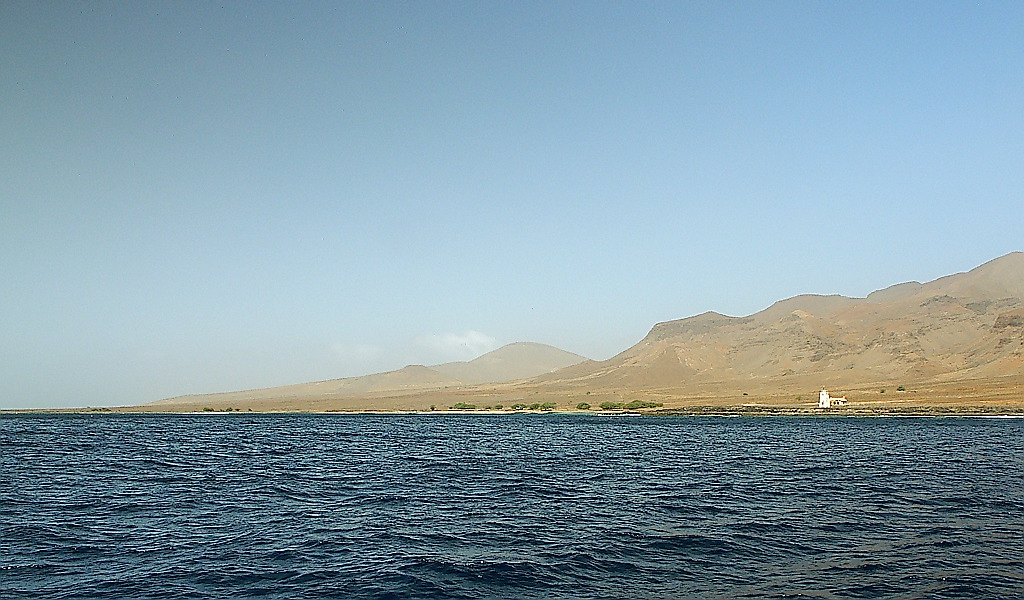
- Location: Ponta do Barril; São Nicolau; Cape Verde
- Coordinates: 16°36′18.8″N 24°25′6.7″W

Tower
- Constructed: 1891
- Foundation: masonry base
- Construction: masonry tower
- Height: 9 metres (30 ft)
- Shape: square truncated tower with balcony and small lantern
- Markings: white tower
- Power source: solar power

Light
- Focal height: 13 metres (43 ft)
- Range: 15 nautical miles (28 km; 17 mi)
- Characteristic: Fl (3) W 12s.
- Cape Verde no.: PT-2058

The lighthouse at the Ponta do Barril was built in 1891. It is a white 9 m high quadrangular tower. Its focal height is 13 m.

== See also ==
- List of lighthouses in Cape Verde
