= Baía de São Jorge =

Body of water

- Location within Cape Verde
- Location: South coast of São Nicolau, Cape Verde
- Coordinates: 16.560°N 24.275°W

Baía de São Jorge is a bay of the Atlantic Ocean on the south coast of the island of São Nicolau in Cape Verde. The Preguiça Lighthouse is near the shore of the bay.
