= Ponta Nhô Martinho =

- Headland
- Coordinates: 14°48′10″N 24°42′06″W
- Location: Southern Brava, Cape Verde
- Offshore water bodies: Atlantic Ocean
- Ponta Nhô Martinho Lighthouse
- Coordinates: 14°48′11.98″N 24°42′5.93″W
- Foundation: masonry base
- Construction: masonry tower
- Height: 4 metres (13 ft)
- Shape: quadrangular tower with lantern
- Markings: white tower, red lantern
- Power source: solar power
- Focal height: 29 metres (95 ft)
- Range: 9 nautical miles (17 km; 10 mi)
- Characteristic: Fl (4) W 15s.
- Cape Verde no.: PT-2184

Ponta Nhô Martinho is a headland on the Island of Brava, Cape Verde. It is the southernmost point of Cape Verde. It is located nearly 4 km south of Cachaço, the nearest settlement. Formerly, the point was called Salt Point (Portuguese: Ponta do Sal), for instance in the 1747 map by Jacques-Nicolas Bellin. There is a lighthouse on Ponta Nhô Martinho, which is the southernmost structure in Cape Verde. Its focal plane is 29 metres (95 ft) above sea level.

== See also ==
- List of lighthouses in Cape Verde
- Geography of Cape Verde
