= Praia Baixo =

- Settlement
- Location within Cape Verde
- Coordinates: 15.0595°N 23.4721°W
- Country: Cape Verde
- Island: Santiago
- Municipality: São Domingos
- Civil parish: Nossa Senhora da Luz

Population (2010)
  - Total: 952
- ID: 75108

Praia Baixo is a coastal village in the southeastern part of Santiago Island, Cape Verde. It is part of the municipality of São Domingos and the parish of Nossa Senhora da Luz.

== Location ==
Praia Baixo is situated on the east coast of Santiago Island approximately:

- 1.5 km northwest of Achada Baleia
- 11 km southeast of Pedra Badejo
- 10 km east of São Domingos
- 16 km north of the capital, Praia

As of the 2010 census, the population of Praia Baixo was 952 inhabitants. More recent estimates suggest an increase to approximately 1,400 residents, reflecting gradual development in the area.

== Geography and Environment ==
The village is surrounded by rocky cliffs and lush landscapes, making it a scenic destination. Its beaches are known for calm waters and vibrant marine life, attracting both locals and tourists.

== Economy and Tourism ==
Traditionally a Fishing village, Praia Baixo is seeing increasing interest from Ecotourism and water sports enthusiasts. The area's pristine beaches and clear waters make it an excellent location for:

- Swimming and snorkeling
- Diving (due to its coral reefs)
- Surfing and windsurfing

== Sea Turtle Conservation ==
The beach of Praia Baixo serves as a nesting area for Loggerhead sea turtles (Caretta caretta). A conservation program is run by the University of Algarve, Faro, Portugal, aiming to protect these endangered turtles and ensure their successful nesting and hatching.

== Climate ==
Praia Baixo has a Tropical climate, with warm temperatures year-round. The best travel period is from November to June, when:

- Daytime temperatures range from 24-29°C (75-84°F)
- Water temperatures remain between 23-26°C (73-79°F)

== Transportation ==
The village is accessible via local roads connecting it to São Domingos and Praia. Public transportation is available, but taxis or private vehicles are often recommended for convenience.
