= Ribeira da Prata =

- Settlement
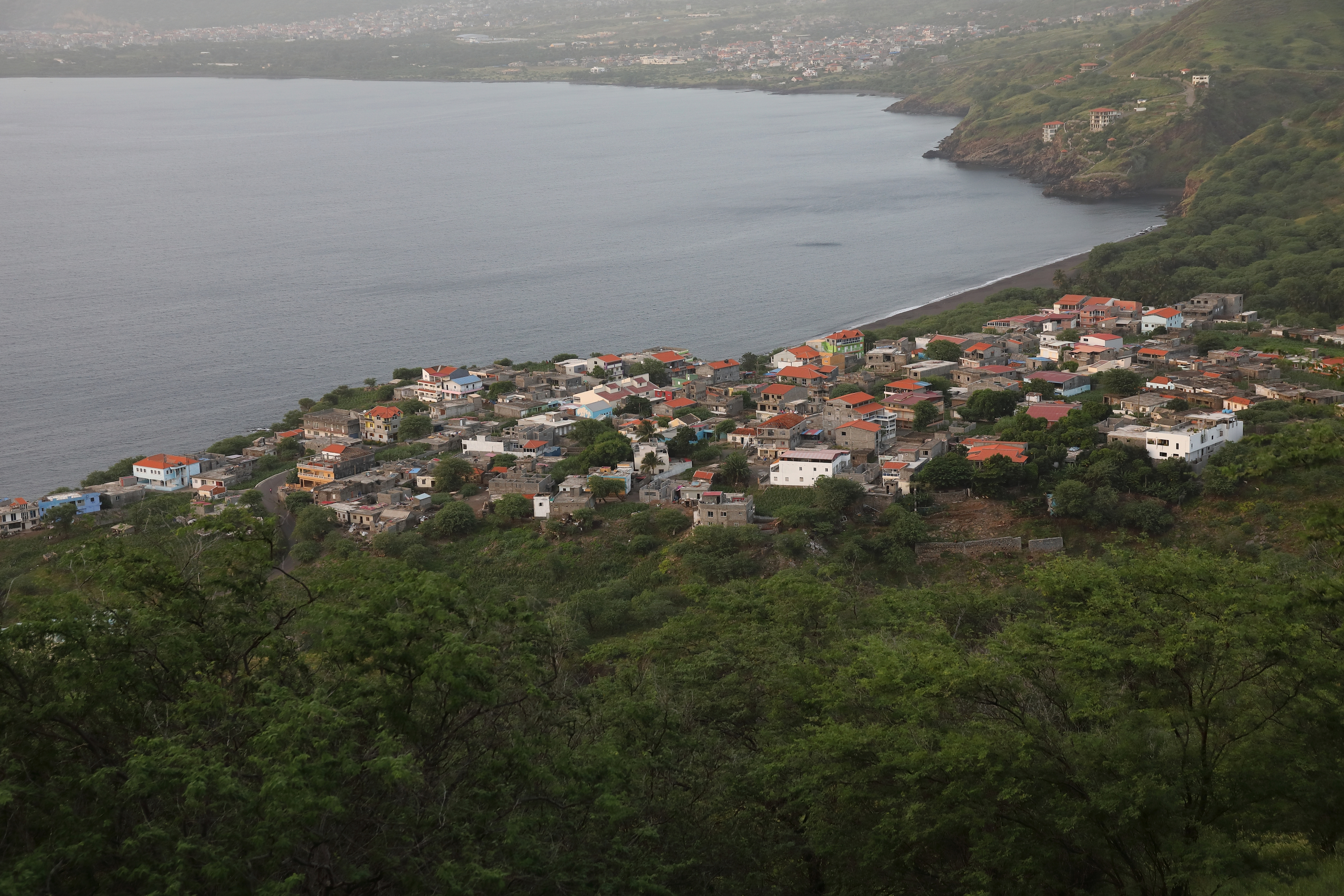

- Location within Cape Verde
- Coordinates: 15.229°N 23.745°W
- Country: Cape Verde
- Island: Santiago
- Municipality: Tarrafal
- Civil parish: Santo Amaro Abade

Population (2010)
  - Total: 1,009
- ID: 71117

Ribeira da Prata is a town in the northern part of the island of Santiago, Cape Verde belonging to the municipality of Tarrafal. In 2010 its population was 1,009. It was mentioned as Rivera de Prata in the 1747 map by Jacques-Nicolas Bellin.
