= Achada Longueira =

- Settlement
- Coordinates: 15.232°N 23.715°W
- Country: Cape Verde
- Island: Santiago
- Municipality: Tarrafal
- Civil parish: Santo Amaro Abade

Population (2010)
  - Total: 520
- ID: 71103

Achada Longueira is a settlement in the northern part of the island of Santiago, Cape Verde. It is part of the municipality of Tarrafal. In 2010, its population was 520. It is located about 7 kilometres (4.3 mi) southeast of Tarrafal, on the Praia-Assomada-Tarrafal Road (EN1-ST01).
