= Ponta Moreia =

- Headland
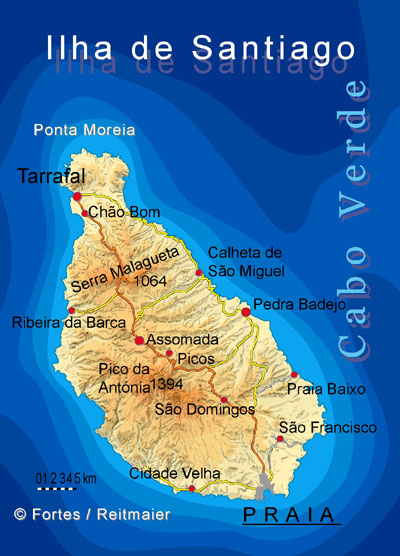
- Ponta Moreia, its location is in the north of the island

- Cape Verde
- Coordinates: 15°20′25″N 23°44′33″W
- Location: Northern Santiago, Cape Verde
- Offshore water bodies: Atlantic Ocean

Ponta Moreia is the northernmost point of the island of Santiago, Cape Verde. It is about 2 km north of the nearest village, Fazenda, and around 5 km north of Tarrafal.

There is a lighthouse near the headland, Farol de Ponta Moreia. It is an 8 metres high tower, with a focal plane of 97 meters above sea level.
