= Rui Vaz =

- Settlement
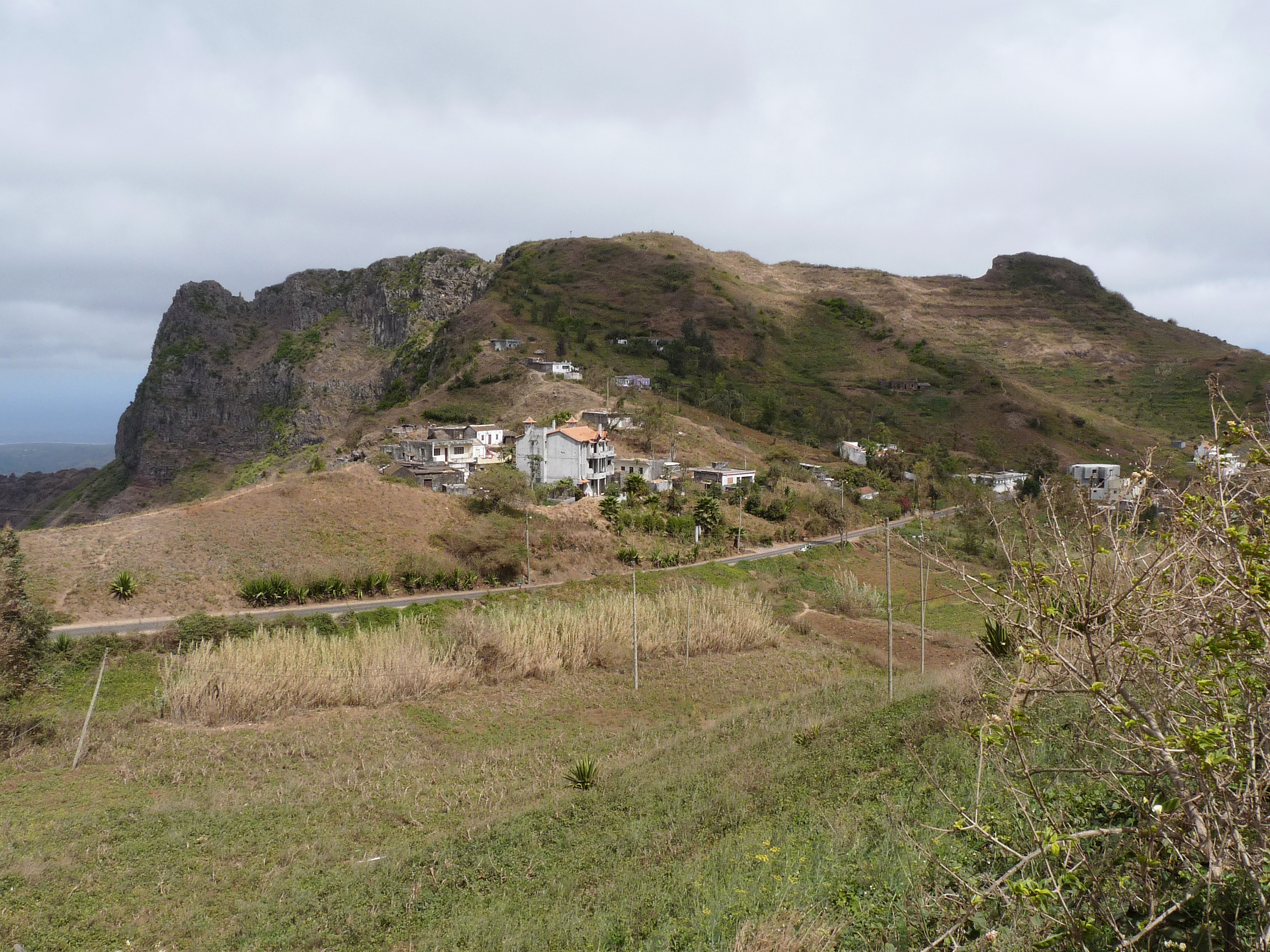
- Village of Rui Vaz

- Location within Cape Verde
- Coordinates: 15.034°N 23.600°W
- Country: Cape Verde
- Island: Santiago
- Municipality: São Domingos
- Civil parish: São Nicolau Tolentino
- Elevation: 809 m (2,654 ft)

Population (2010)
  - Total: 1,078
- ID: 75216

Rui Vaz is a settlement in the central part of the island of Santiago, Cape Verde. In 2010 its population was 1,078. It is situated at 809 m elevation, 2 km south of São Jorge dos Órgãos and 4 km west of São Domingos. It is part of the municipality of São Domingos.

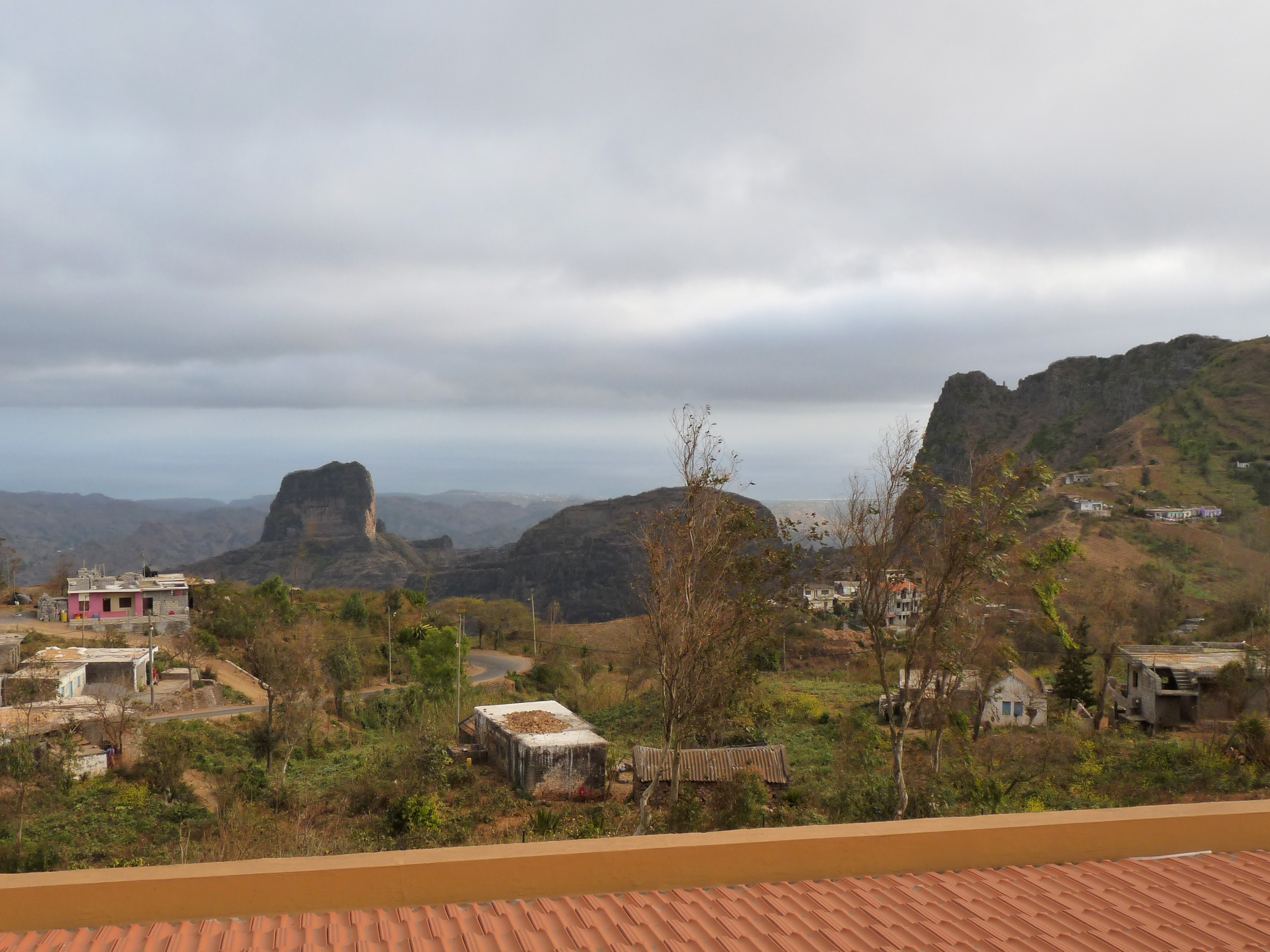
View from Rui Vaz
