= Janela, Cape Verde =

Janela
- Settlement
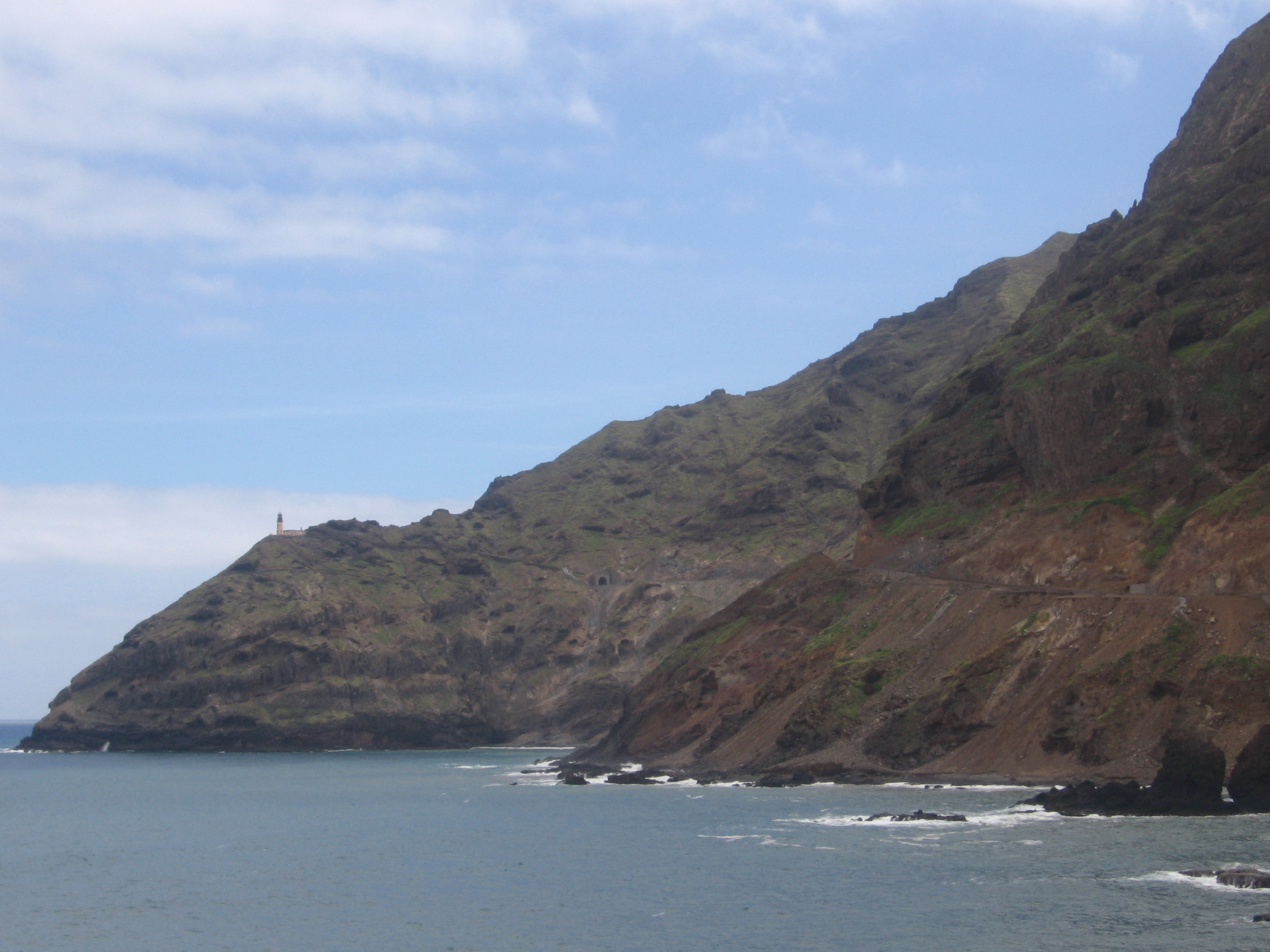

- Location within Cape Verde
- Coordinates: 17.121°N 24.987°W
- Country: Cape Verde
- Island: Santo Antão
- Municipality: Paul
- Civil parish: Santo António das Pombas
- Elevation: 60 m (200 ft)

Population (2010)
  - Total: 1,658
- ID: 12111

Janela (Portuguese for "window") is a settlement in the eastern part of the island of Santo Antão, Cape Verde. It is situated on the Atlantic coast, 4 km southeast of Pombas and 14 km northeast of the island capital Porto Novo The central village, Pontinha, lies on a rocky peninsula. More villages are situated in the valley of the river Ribeira da Janela. The national road from Porto Novo to Pombas (EN1-SA03) passes through Janela.

The easternmost point of Santo Antão, Ponta Salina, lies 4 km southeast of Pontinha. 2 km east of the village is the headland Ponta do Tumbo with the lighthouse Farol de Fontes Pereira de Melo.

== See also ==
- List of villages and settlements in Cape Verde
