= São Pedro, Cape Verde =

São Pedro
- Settlement
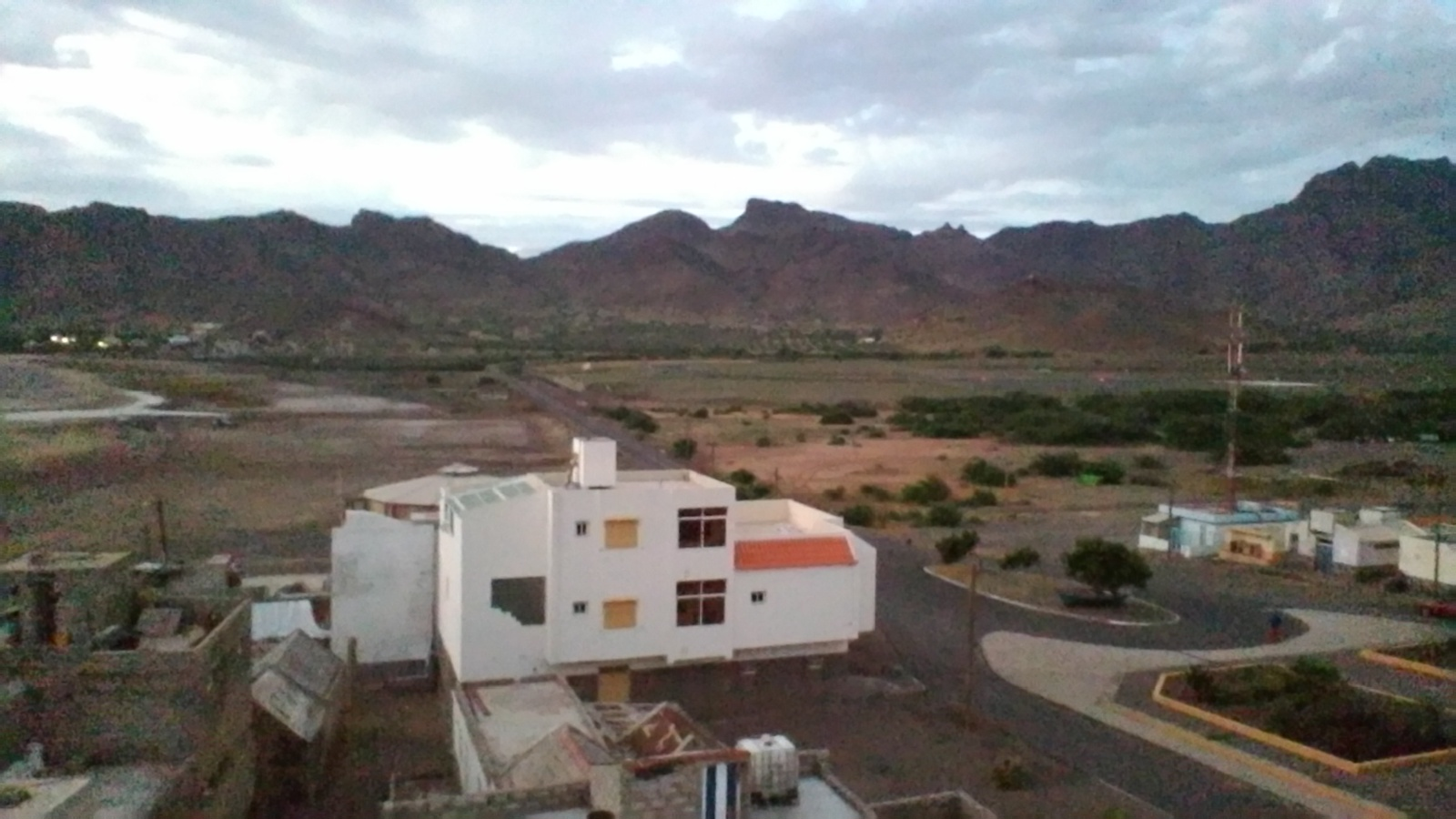

- Location within Cape Verde
- Coordinates: 16.824°N 25.060°W
- Country: Cape Verde
- Island: São Vicente
- Municipality: São Vicente
- Civil parish: Nossa Senhora da Luz
- Elevation: 22 m (72 ft)

Population (2010)
  - Total: 991
- ID: 21107

São Pedro is a village in the southwestern part of the island of Sao Vicente, Cape Verde. It is situated on the south coast, approximately 10 km southwest of the island capital Mindelo. In 2010 its population was 991. Cesária Évora Airport, the island's international airport is directly north of São Pedro. It was mentioned as a small port as "P. St. Pedro" in the 1747 map by Jacques-Nicolas Bellin. The lighthouse Farol de D. Amélia sits on the Ponta Machado, 3 km west of the village.

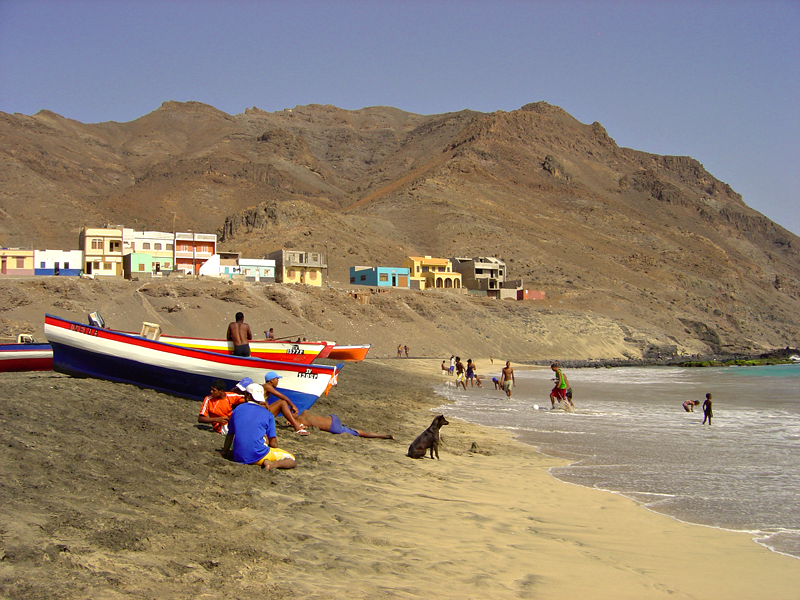
The village of São Pedro and its bay

The beach of São Pedro, with the Dona Amélia Lighthouse at Ponta Machado in the background
