= Fazenda, Cape Verde =

Fazenda
- Settlement
- Location within Cape Verde
- Coordinates: 15.311°N 23.744°W
- Country: Cape Verde
- Island: Santiago
- Municipality: Tarrafal
- Civil parish: Santo Amaro Abade

Population (2010)
  - Total: 107
- ID: 71110

Fazenda is a settlement in the northern part of the island of Santiago, Cape Verde. It is situated 4 km north of Tarrafal.
