= Tarrafal, Cape Verde (municipality) =

Municipality of Cape Verde

Tarrafal
- Municipality
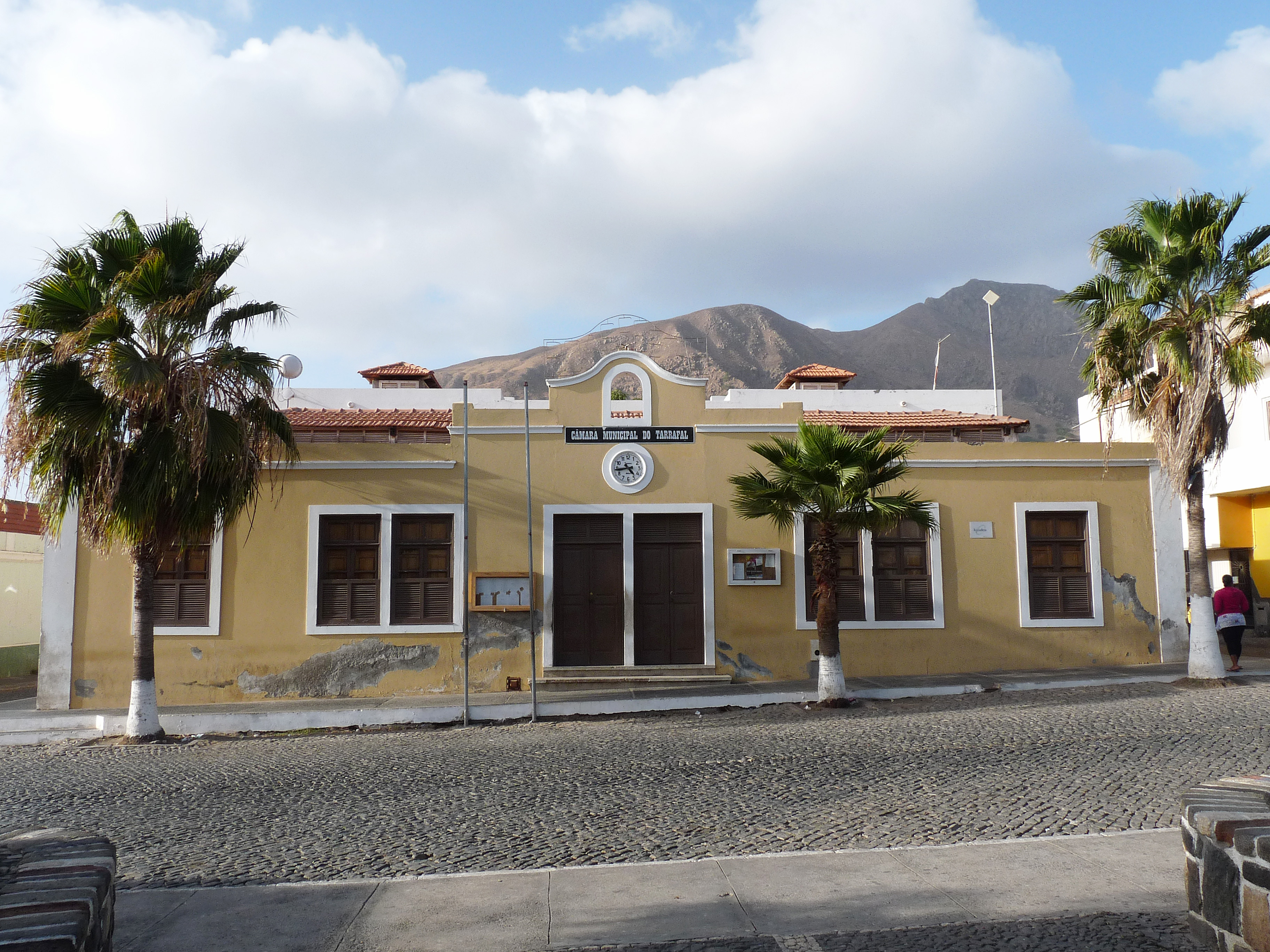
- Municipal hall of Tarrafal

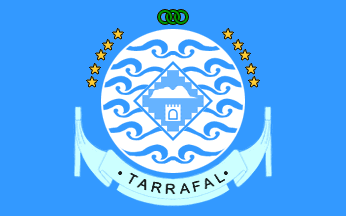
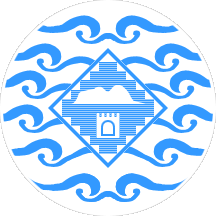
- Flag Seal

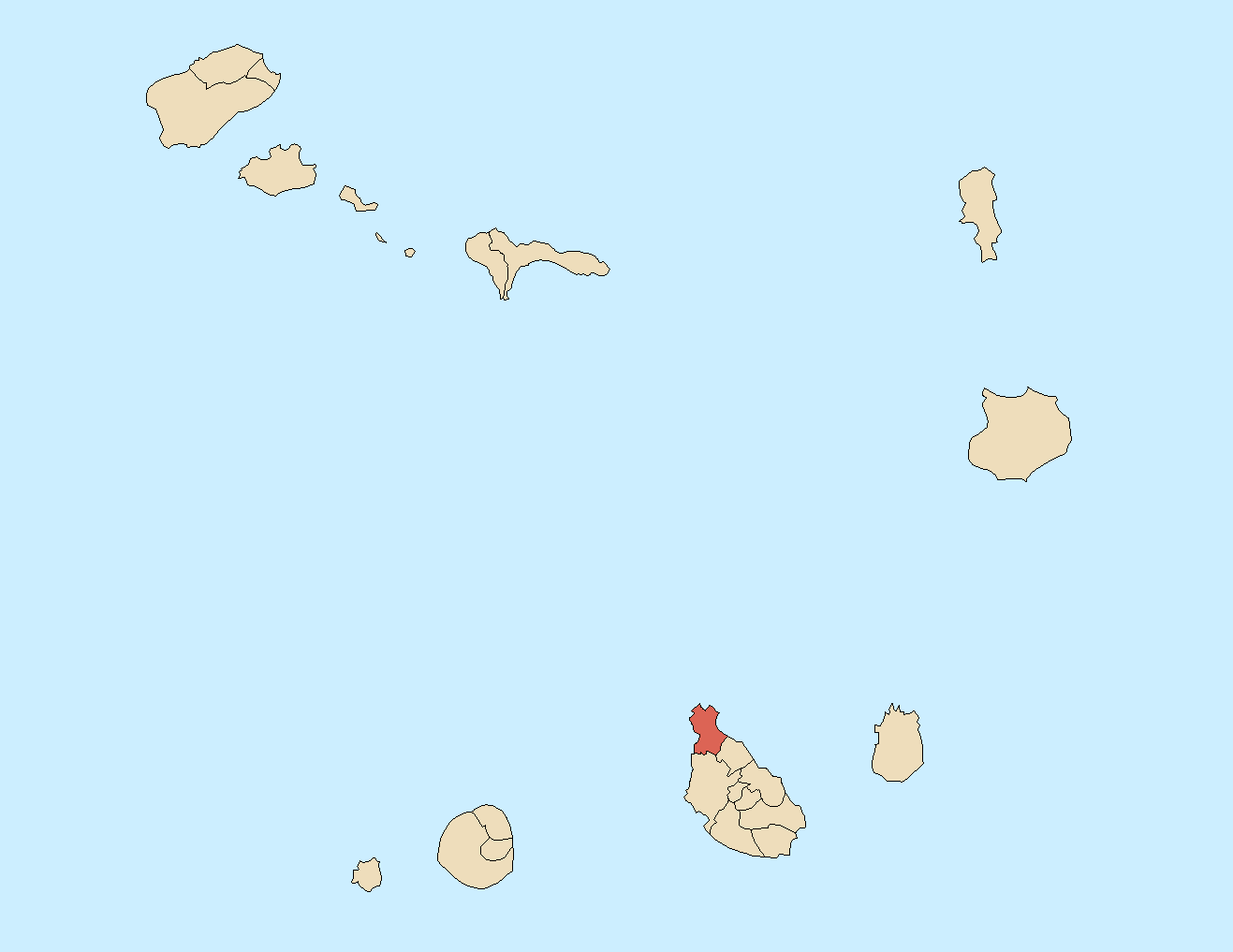
- Coordinates: 15.26°N 23.71°W
- Country: Cape Verde
- Island: Santiago

Area
  - Total: 120.8 km^{2} (46.6 sq mi)

Population (2010)
  - Total: 18,565
  - Density: 153.7/km^{2} (398.0/sq mi)
- Postal code: 7100
- ID: 71
- Website: http://www.cmt.cv/

Tarrafal is a concelho (municipality) of Cape Verde. It is situated in the northern part of the island of Santiago. Its seat is the town Tarrafal. Its population was 18,565 at the 2010 census, and its area is 120.8 km^{2}.

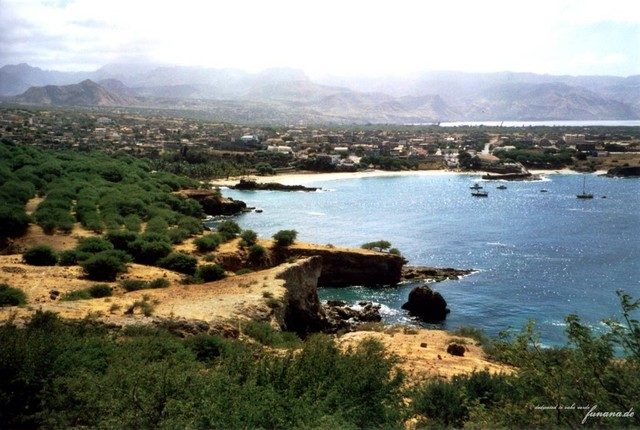
General view of the town and the bay

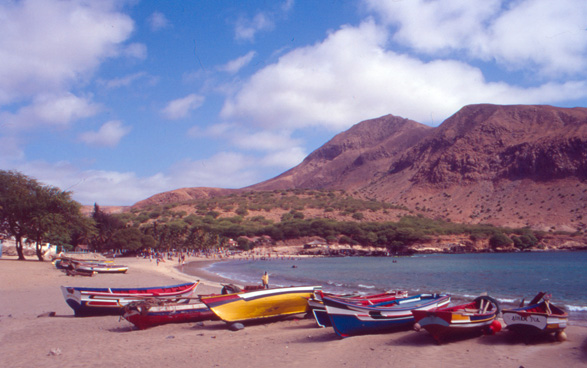
Beach

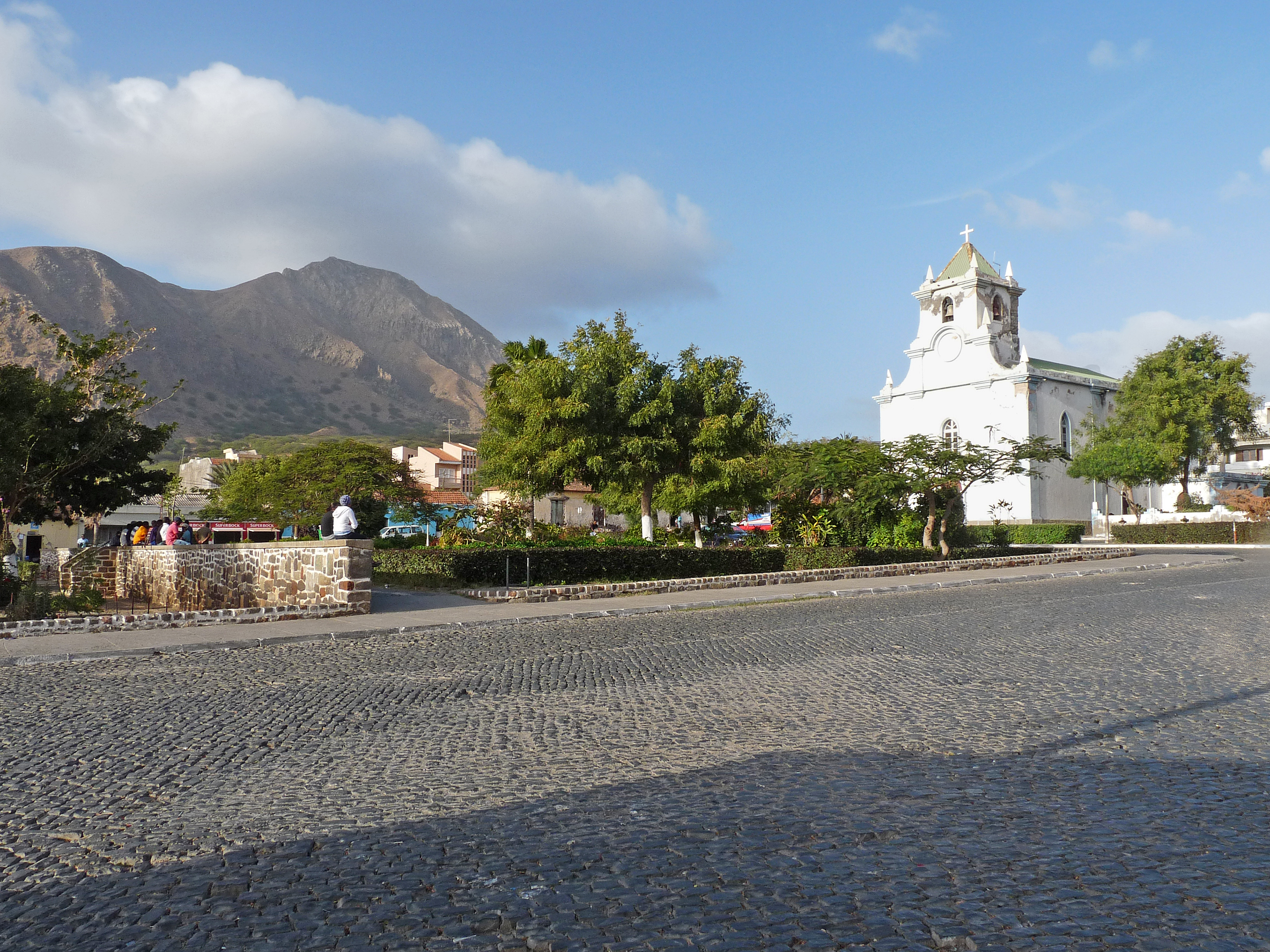
Saint Amaro Abade Church

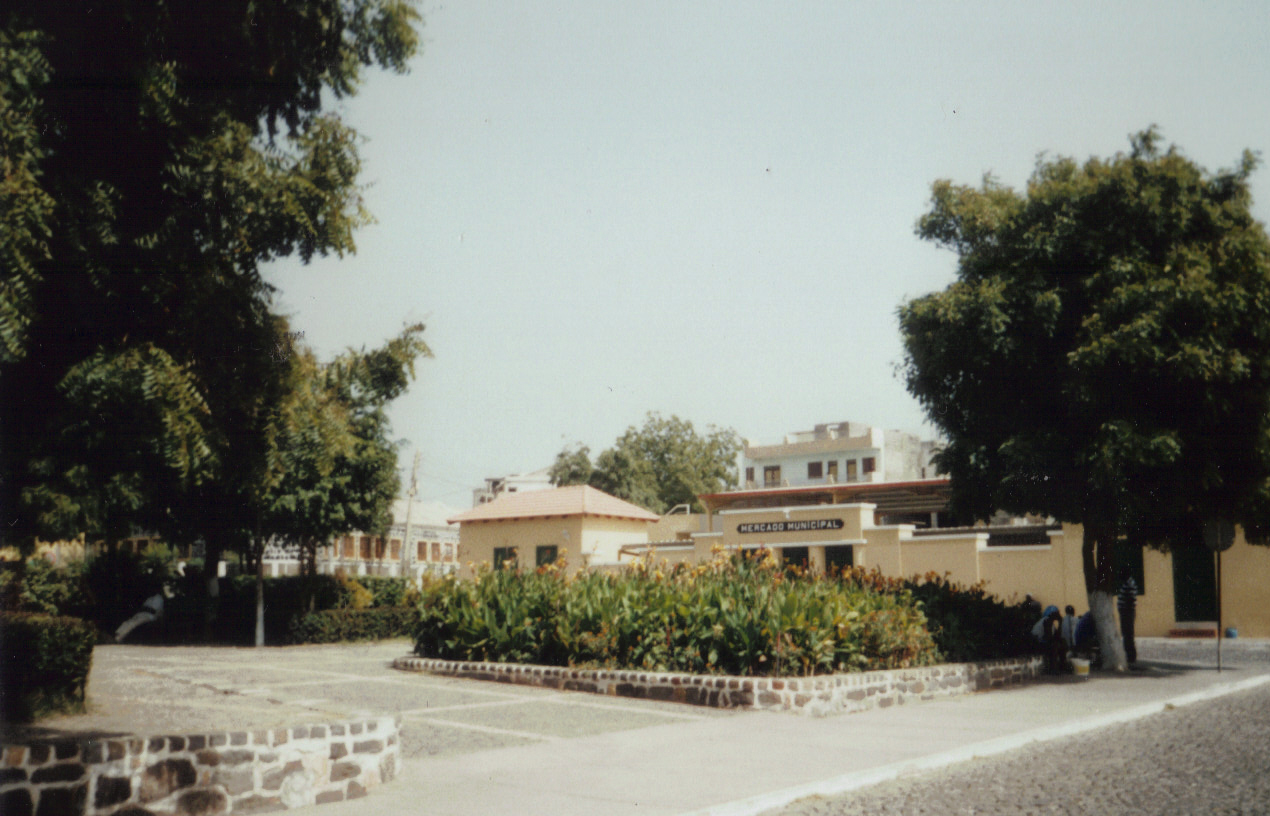
Market Hall

== Subdivisions ==
The municipality consists of one freguesia (civil parish), Santo Amaro Abade. The freguesia is subdivided into the following settlements (population data from the 2010 census):

- Achada Biscanhos (pop: 310)
- Achada Lagoa (pop: 64)
- Achada Longueira (pop: 520)
- Achada Meio (pop: 211)
- Achada Moirão (pop: 587)
- Achada Tenda (pop: 1,242, town)
- Biscainhos (pop: 695)
- Chão Bom (pop: 5,166)
- Curral Velho (pop: 358)
- Fazenda (pop: 107)
- Figueira Muita (pop: 160)
- Lagoa (pop: 55)
- Mato Brasil (pop: 160)
- Mato Mendes (pop: 194)
- Milho Branco (pop: 165)
- Ponta Lobrão (pop: 435)
- Ribeira da Prata (pop: 1,009, town)
- Tarrafal (pop: 6,656, city)
- Trás os Montes (pop: 464)

== History ==
The municipality was created in 1917, when two northern parishes of the older Municipality of Santa Catarina were split off to become the Municipality of Tarrafal. In 1997, the southeastern part of the municipality was split off to become the Municipality of São Miguel. Under Salazar the Tarrafal Concentration Camp was built on the plain south of town (Chão Bom) to contain opponents of the political regime.

== Demography ==
Population of Tarrafal (1940—2010)
Year	Population
1940	18,840
1950	13,222
1960	19,140
1970	26,251
1980	24,202
1990	11,626
2000	18,059
2010	18,565

== Politics ==
At the federal level, it belongs to the constituency of Santiago North. Since 2004, the Movement for Democracy (MpD) is the ruling party of the municipality. The results of the latest elections, in 2016:

Party	Municipal Council		Municipal Assembly	
Party	Votes%	Seats	Votes%	Seats
MpD	53.70	7	54.22	10
PAICV	43.11	0	42.54	7

== Notable people ==
- Pany Varela, futsal player
- Pedro Celestino Silva Soares, footballer (soccer player)
- Silvino Lopes Évora, writer
- Mário Lúcio de Sousa, singer, member of the band Simentera
- Janício Martins, footballer (soccer player)

== International relations ==
Tarrafal is twinned with the following municipalities in Portugal:

- Amadora
- Fundão
- Grândola
- Marinha Grande
- Moita
- Montijo
