= São Francisco Bay =

Bay in Santiago Island, Cape Verde

Coordinates: 14.97°N 23.46°W

The São Francisco Bay (Portuguese: Baía de São Francisco, also Porto de São Francisco) is a bay on the southeastern coast of the island of Santiago, Cape Verde. It is situated 8 km northeast of the city centre of Praia, the capital of Cape Verde. The bay was mentioned in the 1747 map by Jacques-Nicolas Bellin as "St. Francisco".
