= São Domingos, Cape Verde =

São Domingos
- Settlement
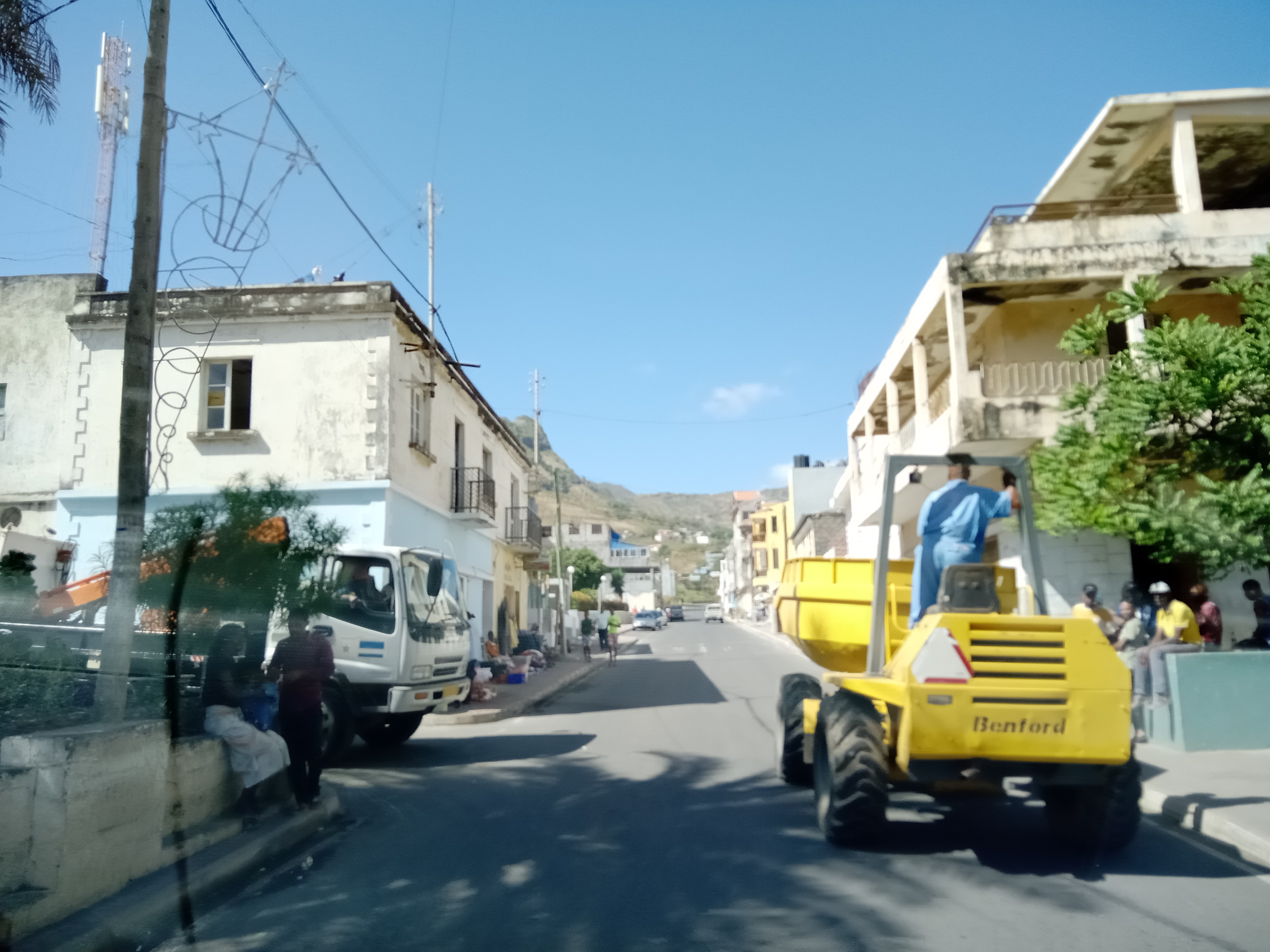
- Main street in São Domingos

- Location within Cape Verde
- Coordinates: 15.028°N 23.563°W
- Country: Cape Verde
- Island: Santiago
- Municipality: São Domingos
- Civil parish: São Nicolau Tolentino

Population (2010)
  - Total: 2,818
- ID: 75217

São Domingos (also: Várzea da Igreja) is a city in the central part of the island of Santiago, Cape Verde. In 2010, its population was 2,818. It is the seat of the São Domingos Municipality. It is situated 13 km southeast of Assomada and 13 km northwest of the capital Praia, along the national road from Praia to Assomada (EN1-ST01). The settlement appeared in the 1747 map by Jacques-Nicolas Bellin as St. Domingo.

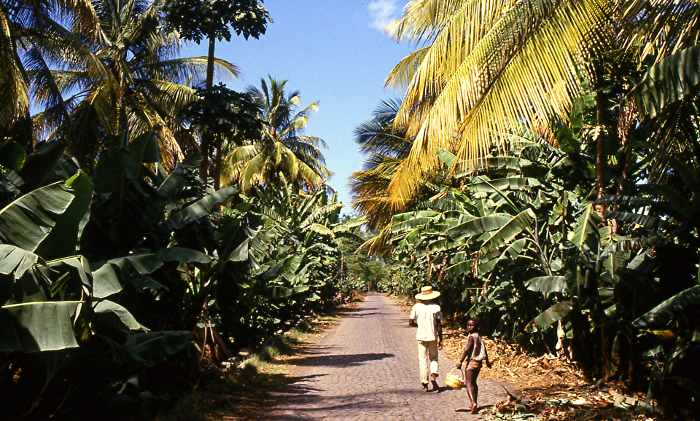
Banana plantation near São Domingos.
