= São Domingos, Cape Verde (municipality) =

Municipality of Cape Verde

São Domingos
- Municipality
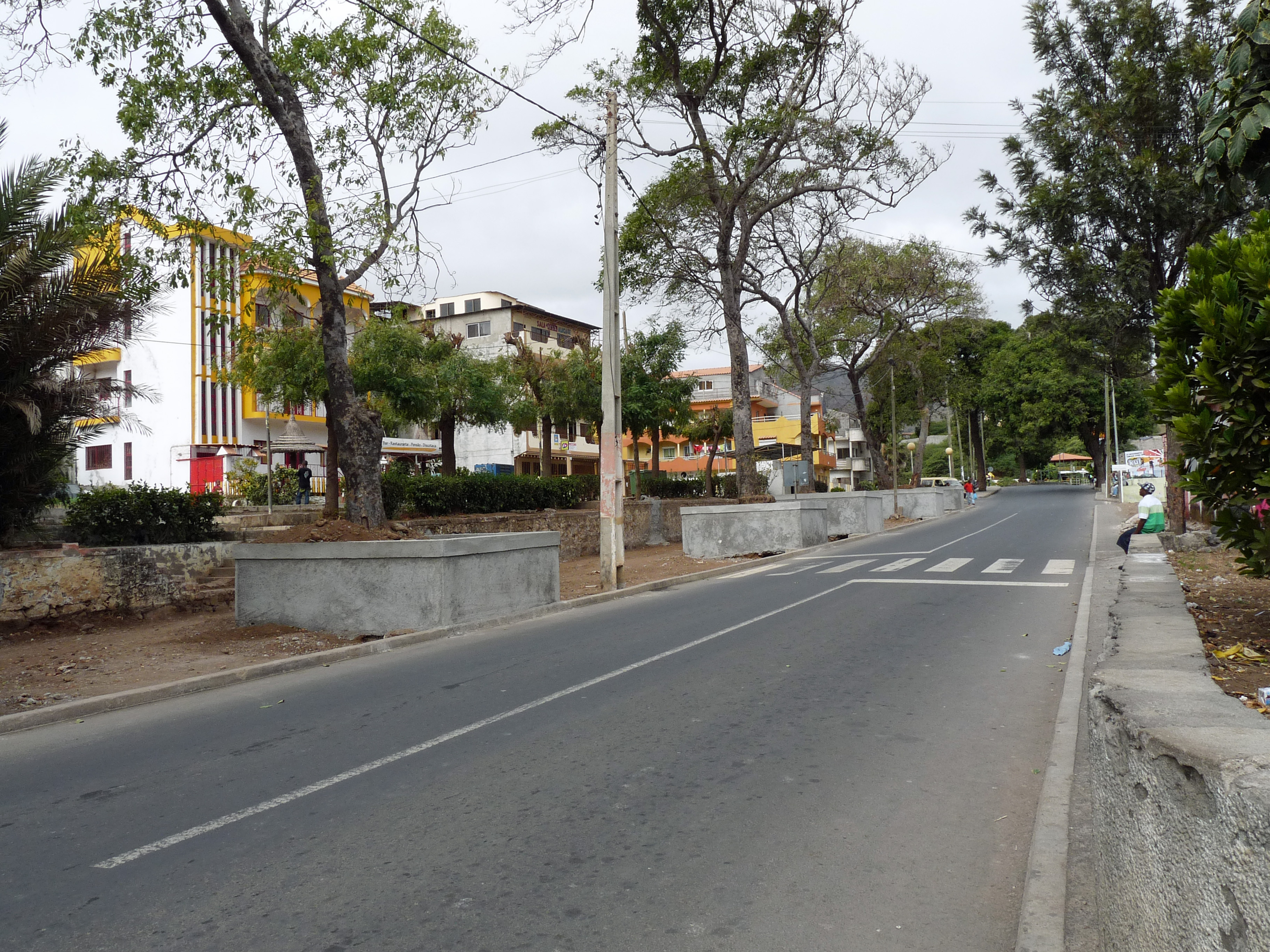
- Main street of São Domingos

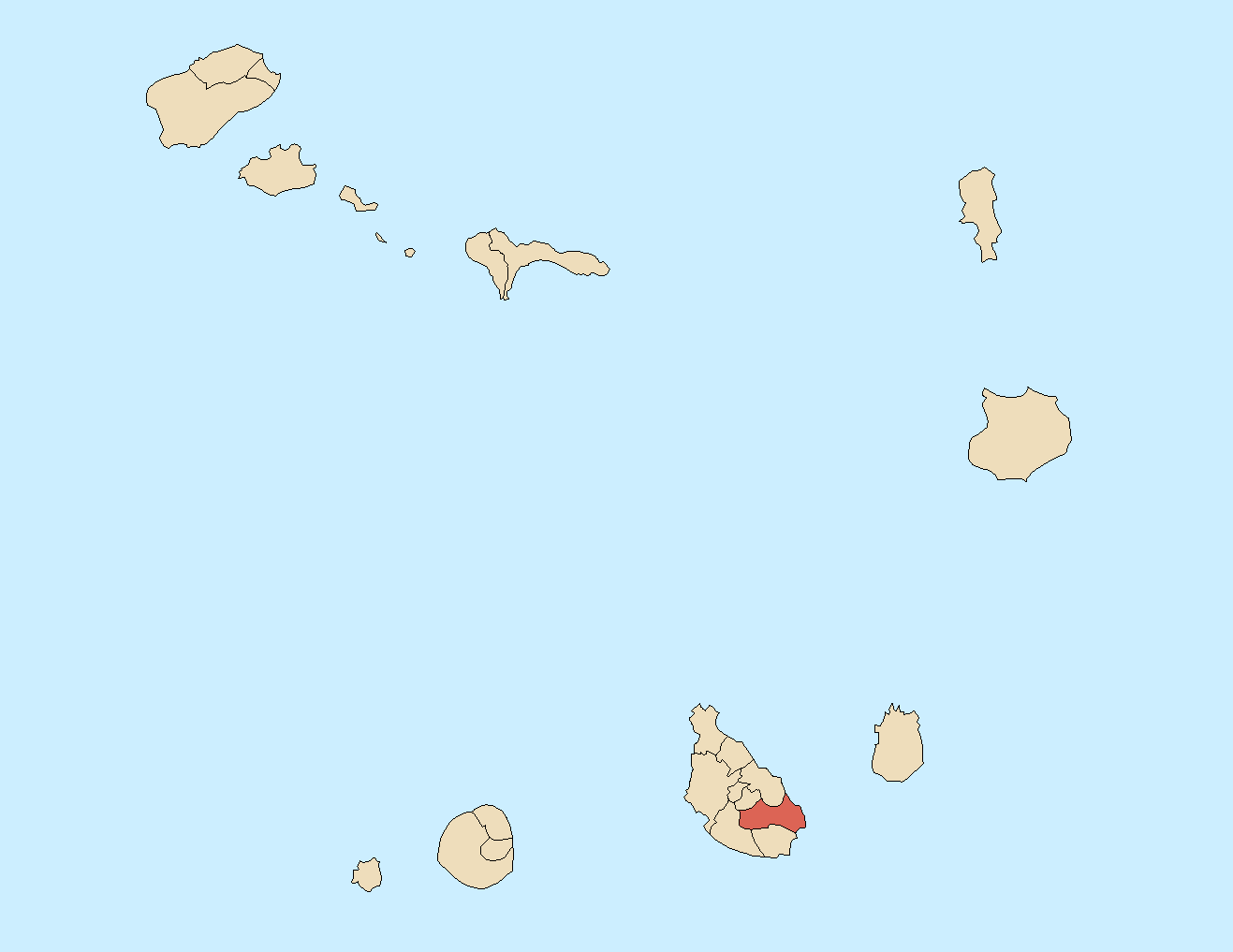
- Coordinates: 15.02°N 23.52°W
- Country: Cape Verde
- Island: Santiago

Area
  - Total: 147.5 km^{2} (57.0 sq mi)

Population (2010)
  - Total: 13,808
  - Density: 93.61/km^{2} (242.5/sq mi)
- ID: 75
- Website: cmsd.cv

São Domingos is a concelho (municipality) of Cape Verde. It is situated in the southeastern part of the island of Santiago. Its seat is the city São Domingos (Várzea da Igreja). Its population was 13,699 at the 2010 census, and its area is 147.5 km^{2}.

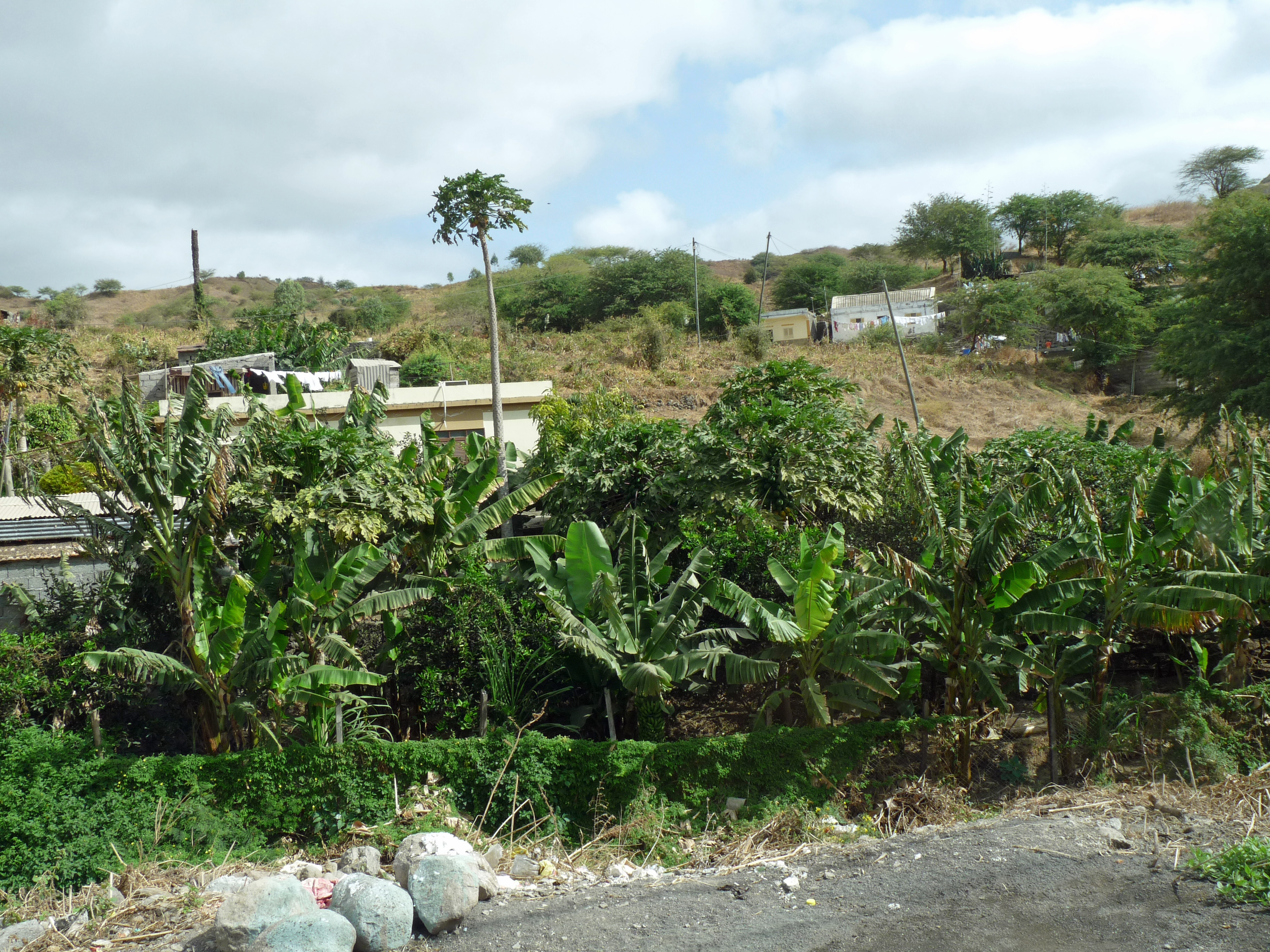
Plantations in São Domingos

The two major settlements in the concelho are São Domingos and Praia Baixo, São Domingos (population about 3,000) being the largest settlement in the area. Smaller settlements in the area include Água do Gato, Achada Banana and Rui Vaz, which is situated on the edge of a 1 km high cliff overlooking Ribeirão Galinha. While Rui Vaz and Praia Baixo are the main tourist draws in the area, tourism does not constitute a major factor in the region’s overwhelmingly agrarian economy.

Farmlands cover the eastern and the central parts, where runoff from the center of the island allows a higher water table and loamier soils than the dense clays found on most of the island. Mountains dominate the western border, where the steep relief and lack of rainwater runoff makes large-scale agriculture impractical. Several dozen subsistence farming villages dot the main road leading towards Assomada, but produce negligible agricultural products for export.

== Parishes ==
The municipality consists of two parishes:

- Nossa Senhora da Luz
- São Nicolau Tolentino

== History ==
The São Domingos municipality was created in 1994, when two parishes of the older Municipality of Praia were separated to become the Municipality of São Domingos.

== Demography ==
Population of São Domingos (1990—2010)
Year	Population
1990	11,526
2000	13,320
2010	13,699

== Notable people ==
- Codé di Dona, singer
- Simplício Rodrigues de Sá, artist who later moved to Brazil and become painter for Pedro I

== Politics ==
At the federal level, it belongs to the constituency of Santiago South. Since 2004, the Movement for Democracy (MpD) is the ruling party of the municipality. The results of the latest elections, in 2016:

Party	Municipal Council		Municipal Assembly	
Party	Votes%	Seats	Votes%	Seats
MpD	61.22	7	60.86	11
PAICV	36.19	0	36.62	6

== Twin towns ==
- Barcelos, Portugal, since 1997
- Bembibre, Spain
