= 2014–15 Fogo eruption =

Volcanic eruption in Cape Verde

2014–2015 eruption of Fogo
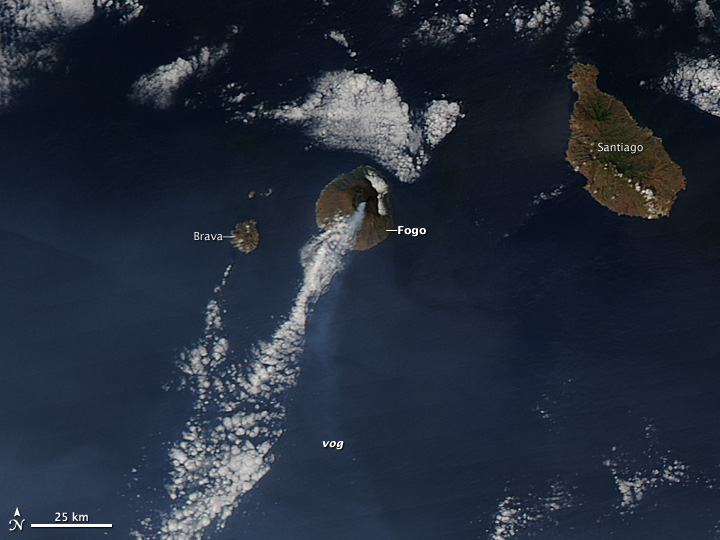
- Satellite map of the eruption of Fogo with its volcanic clouds that headed south on 2 December 2014
- Volcano: Pico do Fogo
- Start date: 23 November 2014
- End date: 8 February 2015
- Type: Hawaiian, Strombolian
- Location: Fogo, Cape Verde; 14°57′00″N 24°20′33″W
- VEI: 3

The 2014–2015 eruption of Fogo began on 23 November 2014, continuing until 8 February 2015. It was the first eruption of Pico do Fogo in 19 years, and the longest since its 1857 eruption. It had a Volcanic Explosivity Index of 3, making it the largest eruption of the volcano since records began.

It caused an estimated five billion escudos (€45.3 million) in damages.

== Volcanic activity ==
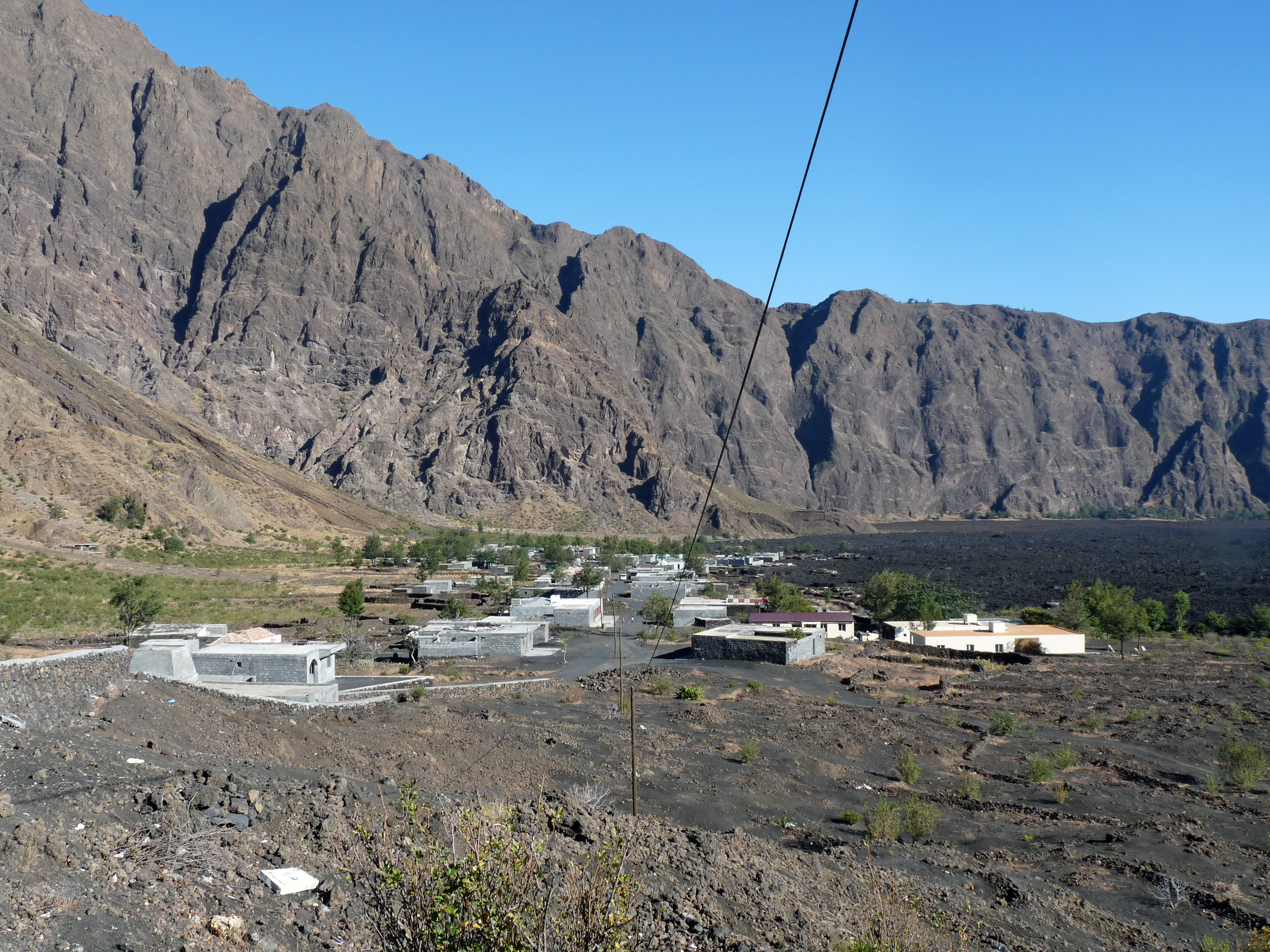
Subdivision of Bangaeira in February 2012, two and a half years before the eruption

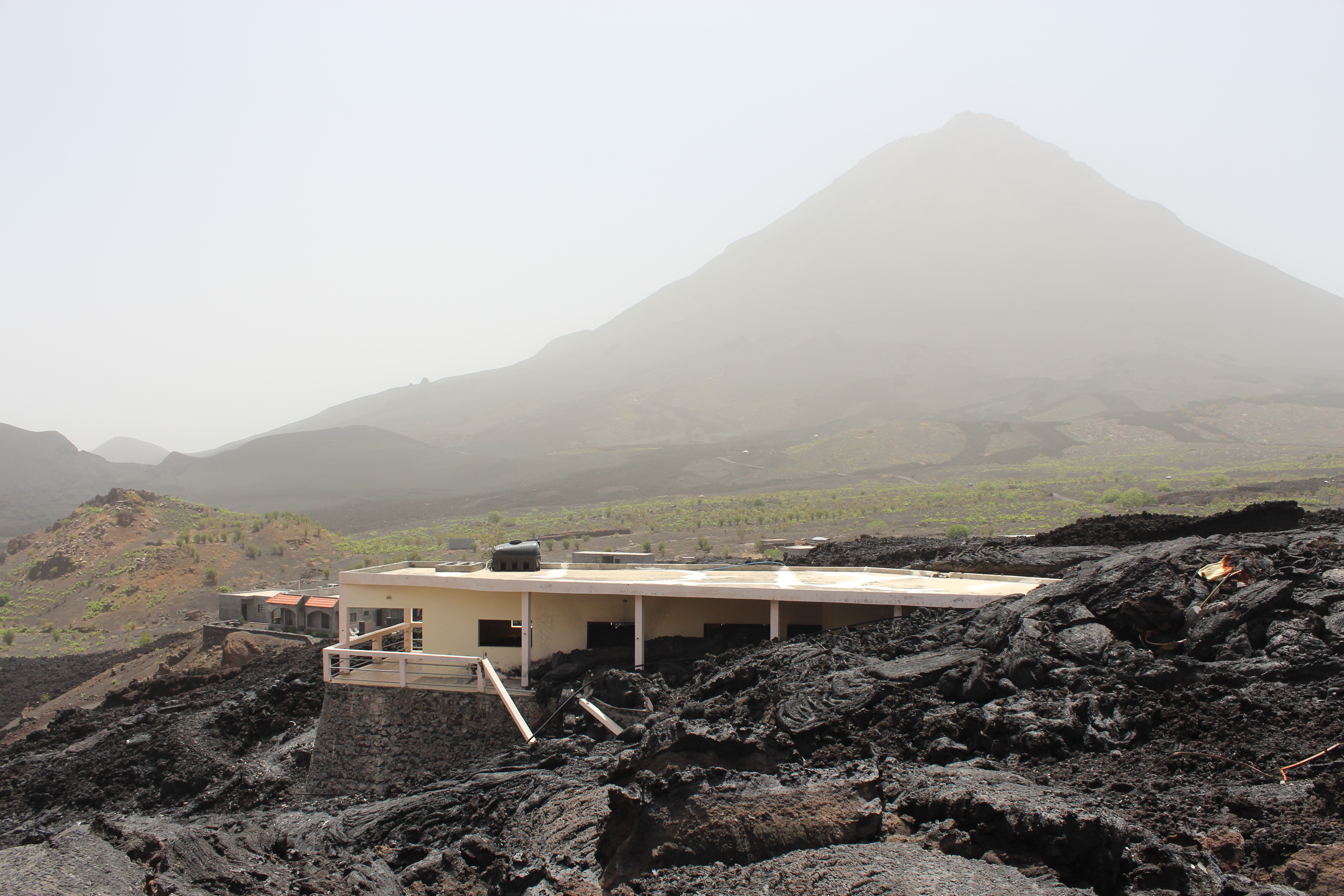
This single storey flat roof house like other buildings in the village destroyed by lava flow, the south of the lower part with most of the balcony were destroyed, the remainder and the upper were left undamaged. The photo was taken more than two years after the eruption in April 2017

The volcano started erupting shortly after 10 a.m. on Sunday, 23 November 2014. There had been a few days of heightened seismic activity, with stronger tremors occurring the night before the eruption started. The eruption began at Pico Pequeno and at another location near the crater made by the 1995 eruption. The population of Chã das Caldeiras, totaling around 1,000 inhabitants, spent the night outside their homes due to the strong earthquakes, and started being evacuated when the eruption began. As in 1995, some people initially refused to abandon their homes, but eventually heeded the authorities' instructions.

On 27 November, a lava flow moved northward toward the village center. During the first days of eruption, a 3.5 km stretch of the southern basalt paved road that connected São Filipe was covered with lava. On 1 December, the lava flow rate was 15 meters an hour and it had engulfed 400 ha of land, destroyed 18 houses and was nearing the village center. A day later, lava entered into Portela where 50 houses were destroyed along with a school and a hotel. By 7 December, much of Portela was ruined and 70% of Bangaeira had been damaged. On 9 December, lava reached more areas inside the Bordeira and Bangaeira and by 12 December it affected almost all of Bangaeira.

=== Football competitions cancelled ===
Not long after the eruption, the 2014–2015 Fogo Premier Division just started its new season. Into the second round of competition, as the Baxada-Nô Pintcha and Spartak-Academica were about to begin that day after the noon hour, as the eruption started four hours before the scheduled match, the second round was delayed and the Spartak d'Aguadinha-Académica match was rescheduled for 14 December and the Baxada-Nô Pintcha for 17 December. The remaining rounds matches were largely rescheduled and its weeks that had breaks were removed. It probably cancelled the 2014–2015 Fogo Cup was cancelled and probably the 2014 Santiago Super Cup with Sporting Praia-Tchadense on the opposite island of Santiago. The third round matches were rescheduled for 20–29 December and lasted for two weeks. After the volcanic activity dwindled, the Premier Division resumed competition on 10 January. It did not affect the Second Division competition which started over a week after the eruption.

=== Little activity and later continued lava activity ===
The lava was less intensified for a week, on 19 December, lava engulfed the buildings and cultivated fields in the small area of Ilhéu de Losna (Dje de Lorna) and the main road with Portela was cut off and later destroyed. The lava flow on 23 December reached the western foot of Bordeira, the first since the 1680 eruption and afterwards became less active.

=== Decrease in volcanic activity and the end of the eruption ===
Lava flows later decreased and became less active and on 8 February, it was finished after 77 days of activity. Overall, it devastated the sections of Bangaeira, Portela and Dje de Lorna and parts of the village, most of the center, the western part up to 1 km and most of the southern part where the volcano erupted.

Lava flow reached most of the middle of the edge of Bordeira in the village as well as the foot of Pico de Caldera, the southernmost and the west rim.

Bruno Faria, a Cape Verdean vulcanologist, said the intensity of the eruption surpassed that of the 1995 eruption, and approached that of the 1951 eruption, one of the strongest ever recorded on the island. The eruption gained in intensity after 23 November 2014. The village of Portela in the Chã das Caldeiras is now covered by a lava stream which has completely destroyed the housing stock.

According to activity made by geologist José Madeira at the University of Lisbon and Instituto Dom Luiz, the total lava flow spewed between 100 and 125 million tons and destroyed buildings, agricultural land and different infrastructures and forced the displacement of about 1,000 people from two villages. Total damage costed about CV$5–6 billion escudos (45 million euros).

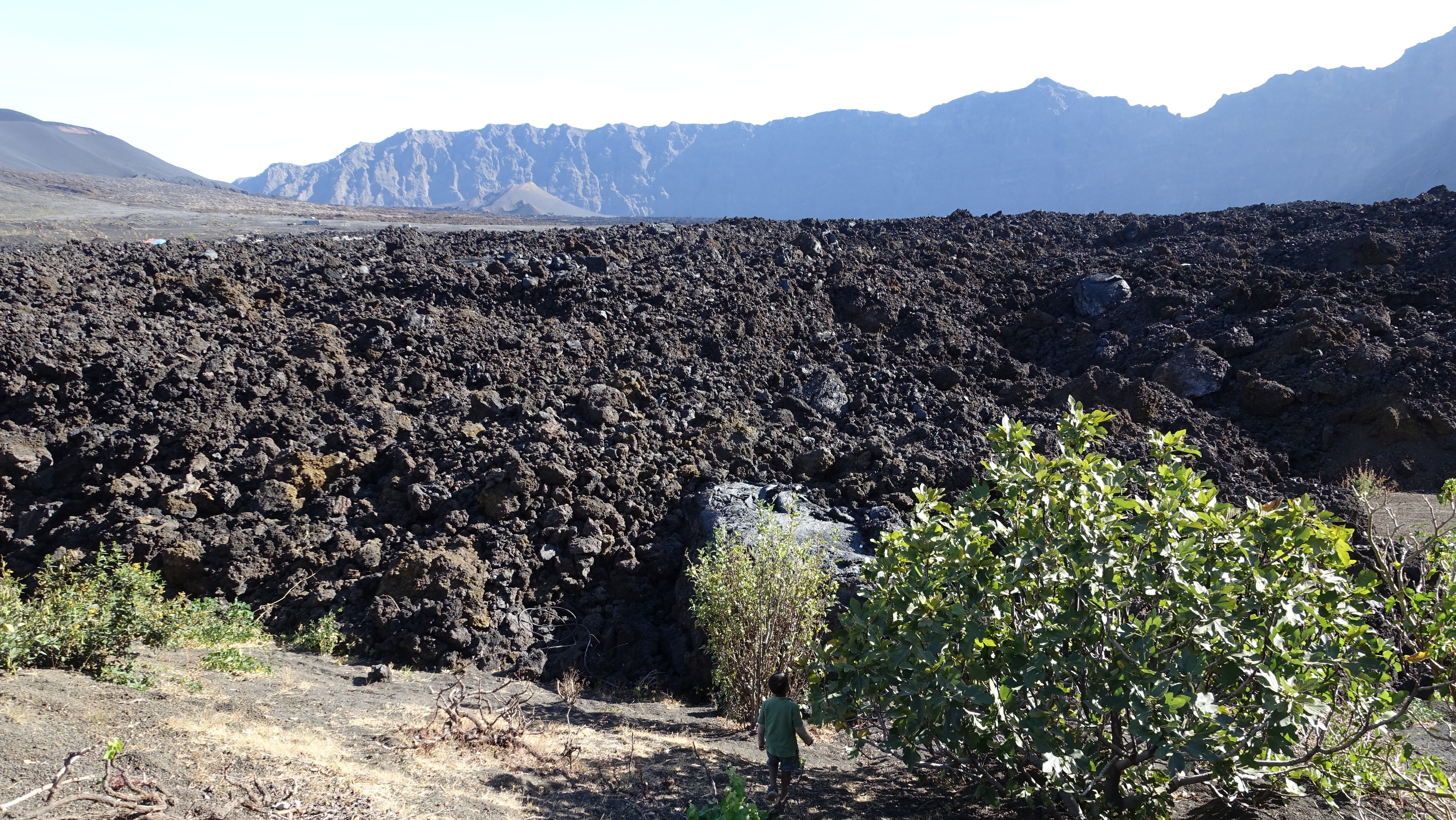
The landscape how the village of Chã das Caldeiras looks like a year after the end of the eruption.

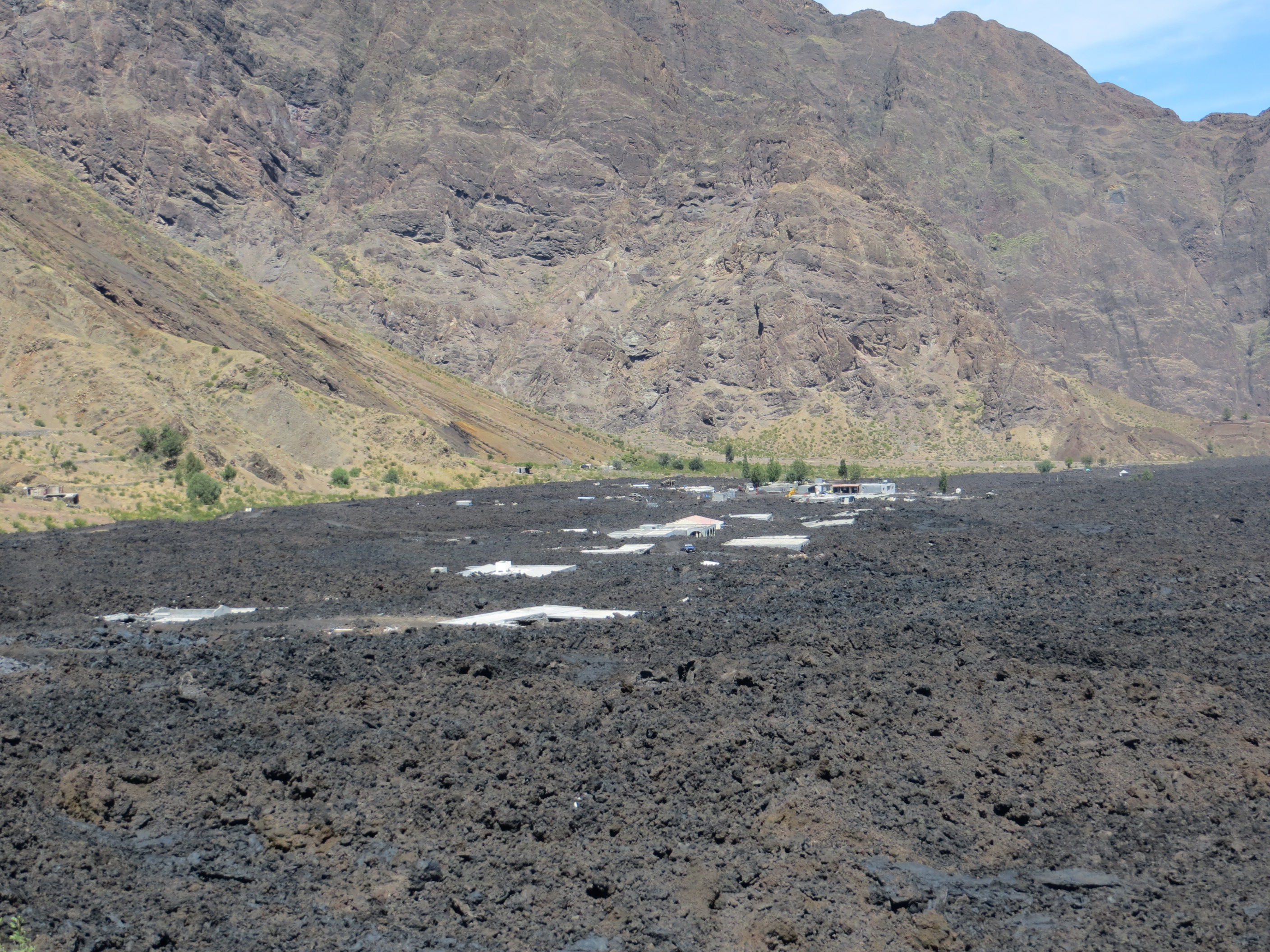
The neighbourhood of Bangaeira on 16 February 2017, two years after the eruption. The white squares are the roofs of houses engulfed by lava.

=== Volcanic cloud cover ===
At the start of the eruption the volcanic clouds headed south towards to Atlantic over the area of Achada Furna and Patim and hovered about 3,000–4,000 meters above sea level up to around 8,000 meters 100 km south and at the highest at 10 km above sea level and went as far as 200 to 300 km, a low pressure front later prevent it from going further, it also covered the areas of Monte Largo, Monte Grande, Salto, Vicente Dias and Fonte Aleixo and went close to São Filpe and its airport. Volcanic clouds were seen as far as the nearby islands of Brava and Santiago, on Santiago, the smoke was seen in the south of Praia and Cidade Velha, in other parts of Praia where the peak is not seen, only the smoke was seen but it was seen in the west of the island. At the end of November, volcanic clouds went north and northeast, first the cloud cover blocked it, then it went further when the cloud cleared For sometimes, the smoke was seen in Maio and other parts of Cape Verde during clear days. In early December, the clouds did not hovered over Achada Furna and Fonte Aleixo. After the volcanic activity was less intensified, the smoke clouds disappeared.

During the cloud cover, the only airport in the southwest of the country was closed and had their flights cancelled from the start of the eruption up to late December.

=== In the international media ===
The 2014 eruption of the Pico do Fogo received limited attention in the international media. The geographer Christophe Neff wrote in a blog post about this fact. In this post – "L’éruption du Pico do Fogo du 23.11.2014 – l’éruption oublié .... (The eruption of the Pico do Fogo – the forgotten eruption)". Neff writes that except for the Lusophone world, and some limited attention in the Francophone world (the country is member of the International Francophony Organisation (French: Organisation internationale de la Francophonie)), the eruption received little attention in the international media.

Neff gave the example of Germany, where the first article in the German media, an article in Der Spiegel-online – was published only on 9 December 2014, over two weeks after the start of the eruption.

The British geologist David Rothery also posted a blog article "Why have we heard so little about the devastating Cape Verde volcano?" with a similar content. At the end of the article, Rothery placed a provocative question "Or do we care about volcanoes only if there's a chance of them inconveniencing our air-travel plans?"

== Aftermath ==
After the eruption, the majority left the village as did with the previous eruption and temporarily resided in nearby places of Cabeça Fundão (during the eruption it was evacuated), Achada Furna, Fonte Aleixo, possibly Patim, Monte Largo and Estância Roque, Santa Catarina do Fogo, Mosteiros and São Filipe, possibly smaller numbers temporarily resides in Praia in the adjacent island and a handful in other countries. Cabeça Fundão on the park's edge became the seat of the natural park. Residents from Cabeça Fundão returned to their homes around mid-2015.

It had one of the best architecture, its buildings were made out of lava material and had circular huts known as funco where much of them were destroyed. Other buildings destroyed included the wine buildings and the school. Many streets including the main one were covered in lava. The volcanic observatory was unaffected as it is being on top of Pico da Caldeira uphill from Portela.

Starting in 2016, a few homes out of the same material were rebuilt and some of its inhabitants returned home. Civil engineer and politician Eunice Silva was in charge of the response to the eruption, including provision of housing, money and employment to those affected. The Geographer Christophe Neff, wrote in his blog, after having been in Chã das Caldeiras in November 2017, that the reconstruction of the habitations in the Chã is progressing, and that some hotels are now rebuilt and open for travelers now.

=== Endangered plants ===
Several plants including some grapevines and endangered ones were killed by the eruption. It also affected its wine production.

As 84% of the endemic plants (31 total species) on Fogo are located in Chã and on the Bordeira. 48% of these are designated as rare and/or threatened on the Ministry of Environment, Agriculture, and Fisheries' (MAAP) "Red List. Several of these are located in Chã and the foot of Bordeira. Some or most of the endangered plants that were located in Chã were disappeared, within the peak and the south, there are hardly any plants. A few of them at the edge of Bordeira were also disappeared. Some of these were Echium vulcanorum, Erysimum caboverdeanum (wild carnation), Verbascum cystolithicum (black grass) and Lavandula rotundifolia (aipo). It was the only eruption that affected large numbers of endangered plants in Chã das Caldeiras.
