= Santa Catarina do Fogo =

Municipality of Cape Verde

- Municipality
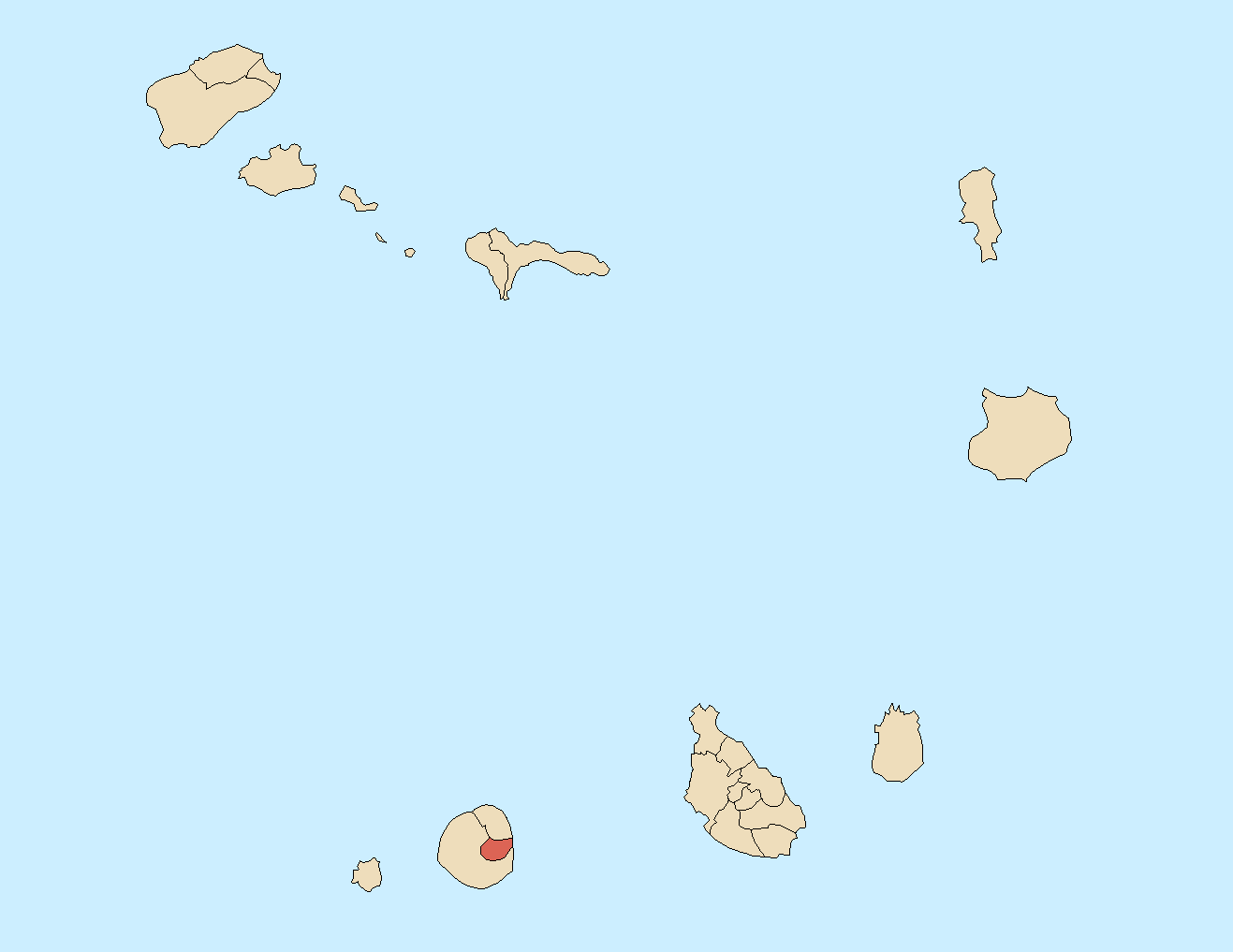
- Coordinates: 14.90°N 24.33°W
- Country: Cape Verde
- Island: Fogo

Area
  - Total: 152.95 km^{2} (59.05 sq mi)

Population (2010)
  - Total: 5,299
  - Density: 34.65/km^{2} (89.73/sq mi)
- ID: 83

Santa Catarina do Fogo is a concelho (municipality) of Cape Verde. Situated in the southeastern part of the island of Fogo, it covers 32% of the island area (152.95 km^{2}), and is home to 14% of its population (5,299 at the 2010 census). Its seat is the city Cova Figueira. The Municipality of Santa Catarina do Fogo was created in 2005; before 2005, it was a parish of the Municipality of São Filipe.

== Subdivisions ==
The municipality consists of one freguesia (civil parish), Santa Catarina do Fogo. The freguesia is subdivided into the following settlements, its population was of the 2010 census:

- Achada Furna (pop: 495)
- Achada Poio (pop: 61)
- Baluarte
- Cabeça Fundão (pop: 177)
- Chã das Caldeiras (pop: 697)
- Cova Figueira (pop: 1,230, city)
- Domingo Lobo (pop: 254)
- Estância Roque (pop: 411)
- Figueira Pavão (pop: 320)
- Fonte Aleixo (pop: 401)
- Mãe Joana (pop: 130)
- Monte Vermelho (pop: 221)
- Roçadas (pop: 372)
- Tinteira (pop: 410)

== Geography ==
The municipality of Santa Catarina do Fogo covers the central and southeastern part of the island Fogo. The northwestern part of the municipality (42.4 km^{2} (16.4 sq mi)) lies within Fogo Natural Park, which includes the Pico do Fogo and its crater.

== Demography ==
Population of Santa Catarina do Fogo (1980—2010)
Year	Population
1980	3,700
1990	4,481
2000	4,796
2010	5,299

== Politics ==
Since 2016, the Movement for Democracy (MpD) is the ruling party of the municipality. The results of the latest elections, in 2016:

Party	Municipal Council		Municipal Assembly	
Party	Votes%	Seats	Votes%	Seats
MpD	53.05	5	53.07	7
PAICV	45.66	0	45.56	6

== Twin towns ==
Santa Catarina do Fogo is twinned with three municipalities:

- (Portugal) Miranda do Corvo
- (United States) Scituate, Massachusetts
- (Portugal) Vila Nova da Barquinha
