= Vermelho (disambiguation) =

Vermelho is a 1996 EP by Brazilian musician Vange Leonel.

Vermelho may also refer to:

- "Vermelho" (song), a song by Gloria Groove
- Mar Vermelho, Alagoas, Brazil
- Monte Vermelho, Fogo, Cape Verde
- Rio Vermelho, Minas Gerais, Brazil
- Vermelho Novo, Minas Gerais
- Vermelho Velho, Minas Gerais, Brazil
- Vermelho River (disambiguation)
