= Immediate Geographic Region of Aimorés-Resplendor =

Urban administrative region in Minas Gerais, Brazil

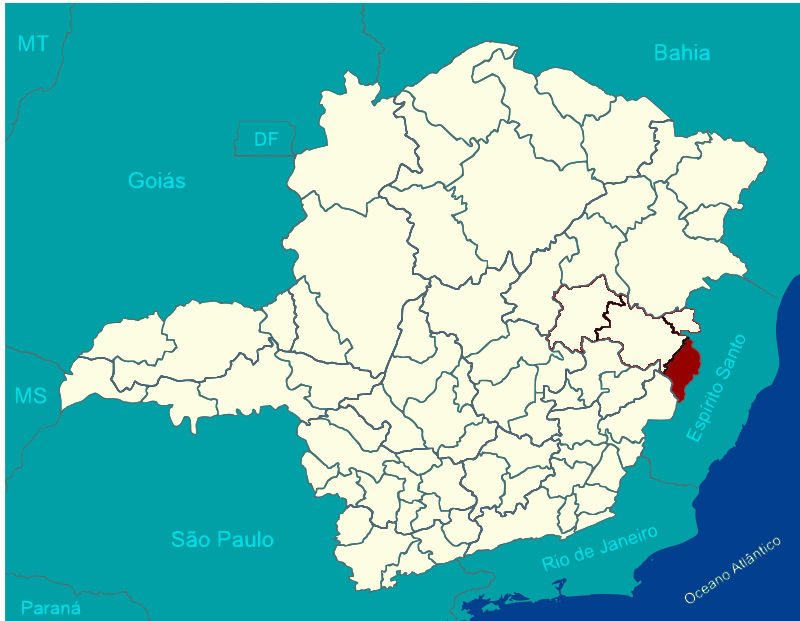
Immediate Geographic Region of Aimorés-Resplendor, in the state of Minas Gerais, Brazil.

The Immediate Geographic Region of Aimorés-Resplendor is one of the 4 immediate geographic regions in the Intermediate Geographic Region of Governador Valadares, one of the 70 immediate geographic regions in the Brazilian state of Minas Gerais and one of the 509 of Brazil, created by the National Institute of Geography and Statistics (IBGE) in 2017.

== Municipalities ==
It comprises 5 municipalities.

- Aimorés
- Cuparaque
- Itueta
- Resplendor
- Santa Rita do Itueto
