= Vermelho River =

There are several rivers named Vermelho River in Brazil:

- Vermelho River (Corrente River tributary), in the Goiás state in central Brazil
- Vermelho River (Araguaia River tributary), in the Goiás state in central Brazil
- Vermelho River (Mato Grosso), in the Mato Grosso state in western Brazil
- Vermelho River (Pará), in the Pará state in north-central Brazil
- Vermelho River (Iguazu River tributary), in the Paraná state in southern Brazil
- Vermelho River (Paranapanema River tributary), in the Paraná state in southern Brazil
- Vermelho River (Rondônia), a river of Rondônia
- Vermelho River (Santa Catarina), in the Santa Catarina state in southeastern Brazil, draining to the Uruguay River
- Vermelho River (São Paulo), in the São Paulo state in southeastern Brazil
- Vermelho River (Manuel Alves Grande River tributary), in the Tocantins state in central Brazil
- Vermelho River (Perdida River tributary), in the Tocantins state in central Brazil

== See also ==
- Uruçuí-Vermelho River, in Piauí state, Brazil
- Rio Vermelho, a Brazilian municipality in Minas Gerais
- Rio Vermelho State Forest, Rondônia, Brazil
- Vermelho (disambiguation)
