= Monte Vermelho, Fogo =

- Settlement
- Coordinates: 14.8454°N 24.3281°W
- Country: Cape Verde
- Island: Fogo
- Municipality: Santa Catarina do Fogo
- Civil parish: Santa Catarina do Fogo

Population (2010)
  - Total: 221
- ID: 83194

Monte Vermelho is a settlement in the southeastern part of the island of Fogo, Cape Verde. It is situated 3 km east of Fonte Aleixo, 3 km southwest of Figueira Pavão, 6 km southwest of Cova Figueira and 19 km southeast of the island capital São Filipe. At the 2010 census its population was 221. Its elevation is about 400 meters.

== See also ==
- List of villages and settlements in Cape Verde
