= Mantena =

Mantena may refer to:

- Immediate Geographic Region of Mantena, Minas Gerais, Brazil
  - Mantena, Minas Gerais, a municipality within the geographic region
- Mantena (company), a Norwegian engineering company
- Madhu Mantena (born 1975), Indian film producer and entrepreneur
- Mantena Rama Raju, Indian politician elected in 2019

== See also ==
- Manthena Venkata Raju (1904–1968), Indian politician and social worker
