= Ávine =

Brazilian footballer

Personal information
- Full name: Ávine Júnior Cardoso
- Date of birth: February 21, 1988 (age 38)
- Place of birth: Aimorés, Brazil
- Height: 1.70 m (5 ft 7 in)
- Position: Defender

Team information
- Current team: Bahia
- Number: 6

Youth career
- Bahia

Senior career*
Years	Team	Apps	(Gls)
2006–2016	Bahia	222	(17)
2009	→Santo André (loan)	10	(0)
2017	Juazeirense	6	(0)
2019	Novo Horizonte	0	(0)

International career
2004–2005	Brazil U-17	3	(0)
- * Club domestic league appearances and goals

Ávine Júnior Cardoso or simply Ávine (born February 21, 1988, in Aimorés) is a Brazilian footballer, who plays Bahia.

== Honours ==
Bahia

- Campeonato Baiano: 2012
