= Rio Vermelho =

Municipality in Minas Gerais, Brazil

Coordinates: 18°17′38″S 43°00′32″W

- Municipality
- Municipality of Rio Vermelho
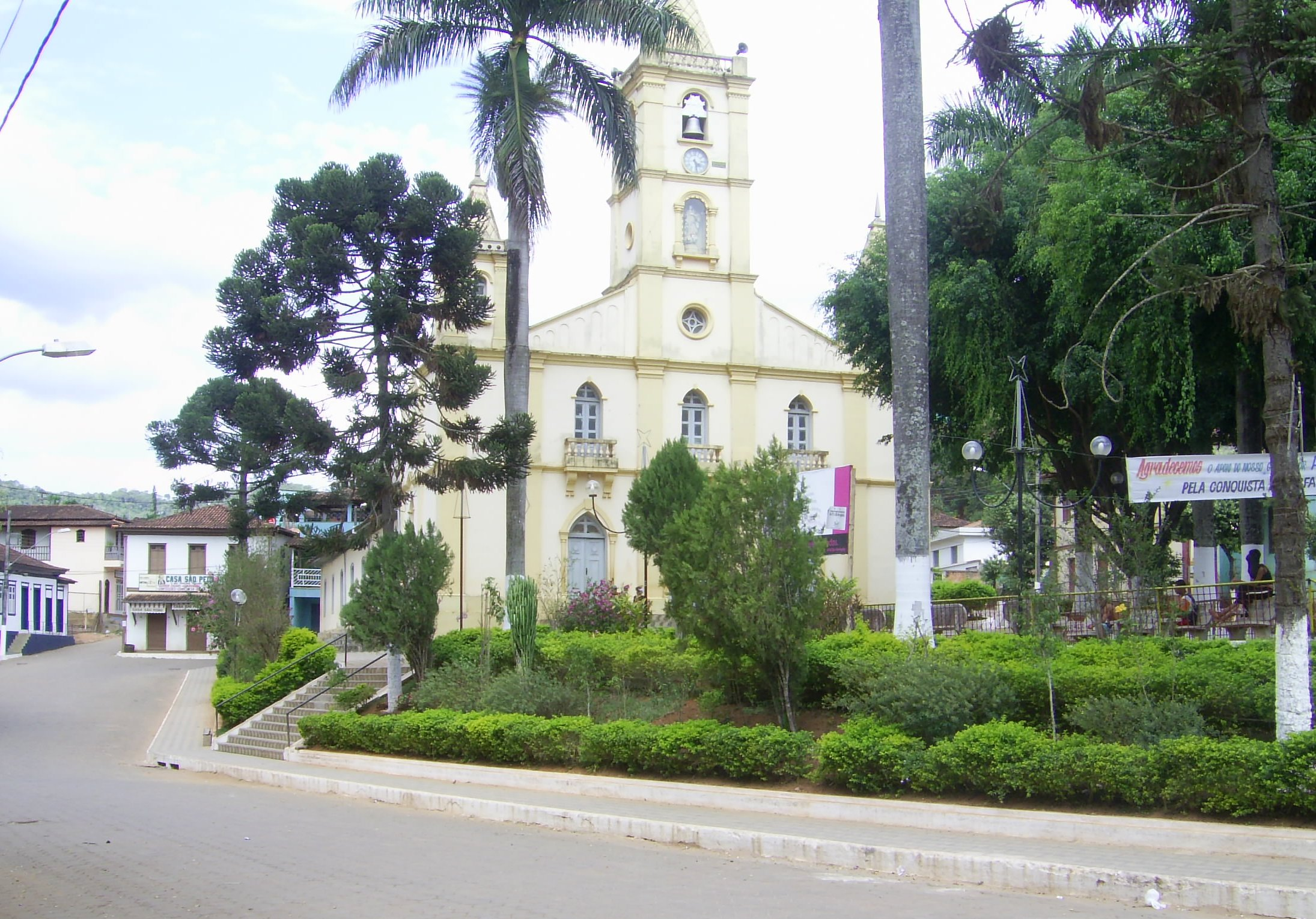

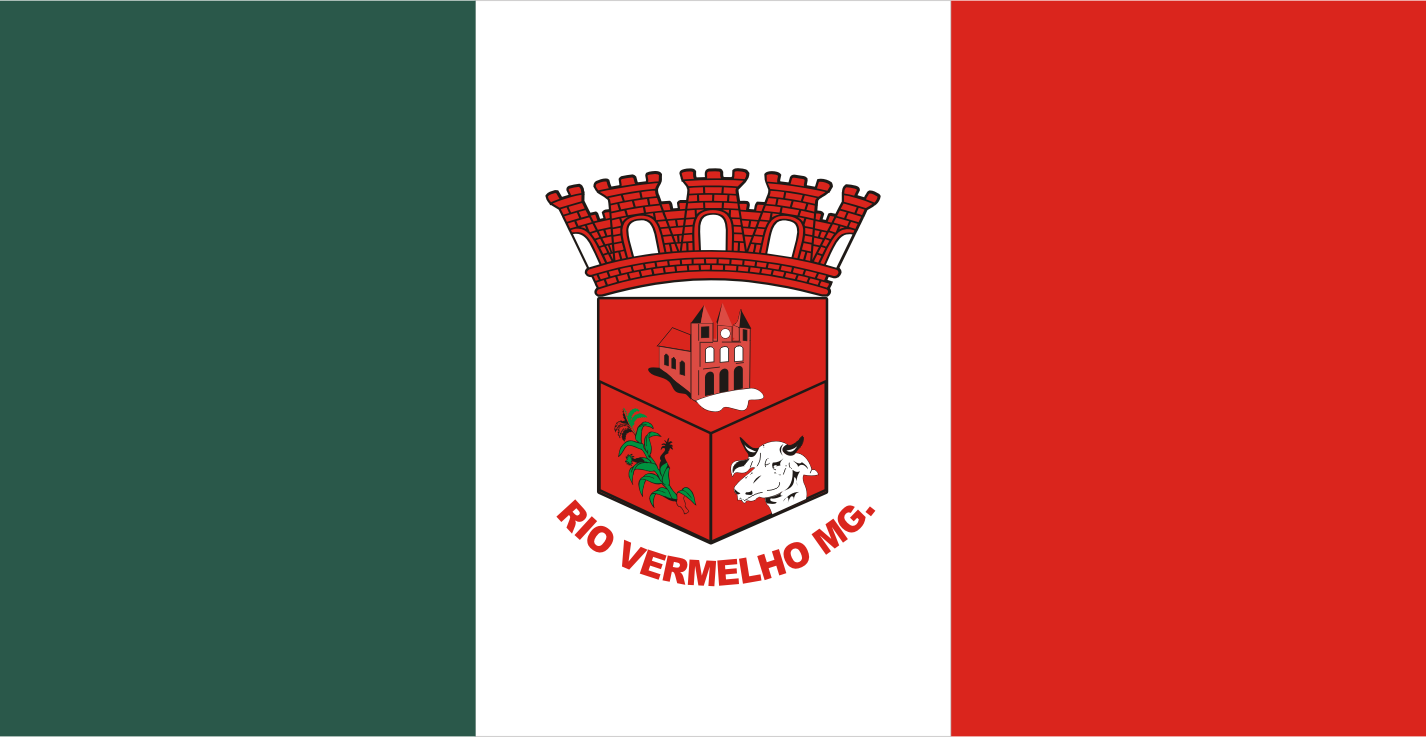
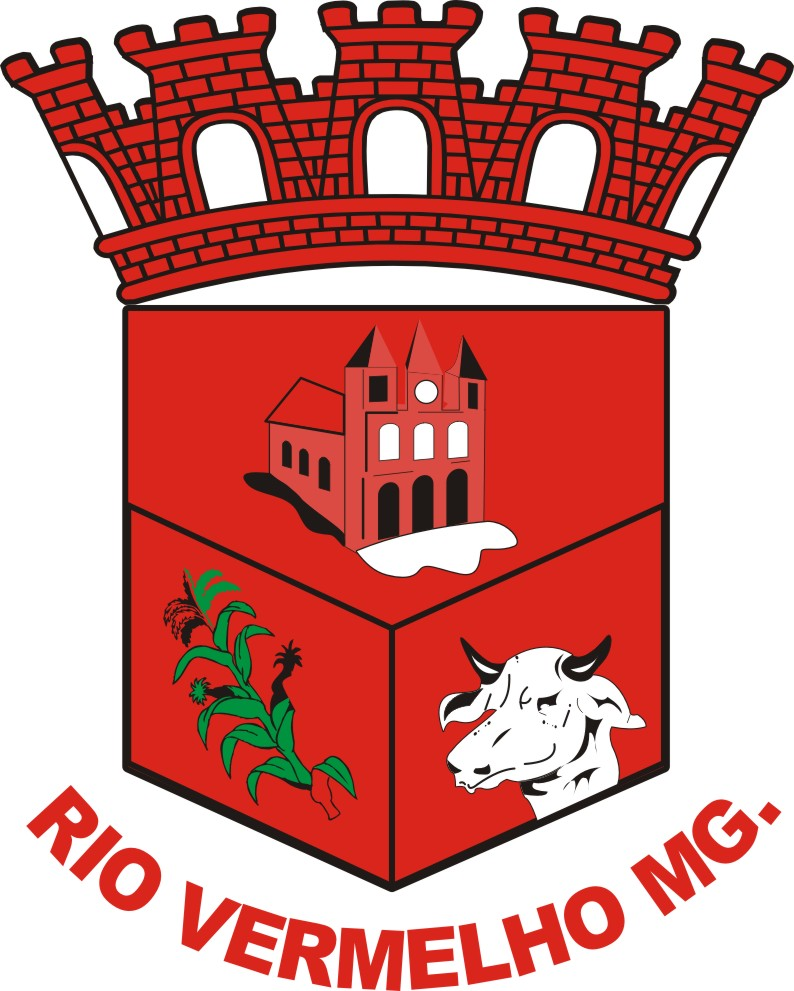
- Flag Coat of arms

- Location in Minas Gerais
- Country: Brazil
- State: Minas Gerais
- Region: Southeast
- Intermediate Region: Governador Valadares
- Immediate Region: Guanhães
- Founded: 31 January 1938

Government
  - Mayor: Marcus Vinicius Dayrell de Oliveira (PSD)

Area
  - Total: 986.561 km^{2} (380.913 sq mi)
- Elevation: 831 m (2,726 ft)

Population (2022 Census)
  - Total: 12,641
  - Estimate (2025): 12,770
- Demonym: rio-vermelhense
- Time zone: UTC−3 (BRT)
- Postal Code: 39170-000 to 39179-999
- HDI (2010): 0.558 – medium
- Website: riovermelho.mg.gov.br

Rio Vermelho is a Brazilian municipality located in the state of Minas Gerais. The city belongs to the mesoregion Metropolitana de Belo Horizonte and to the microregion of Conceição do Mato Dentro. As of 2025, the estimated population was 12,770.

== See also ==
- List of municipalities in Minas Gerais
