= Nossa Senhora da Conceição (São Filipe) =

- Civil parish
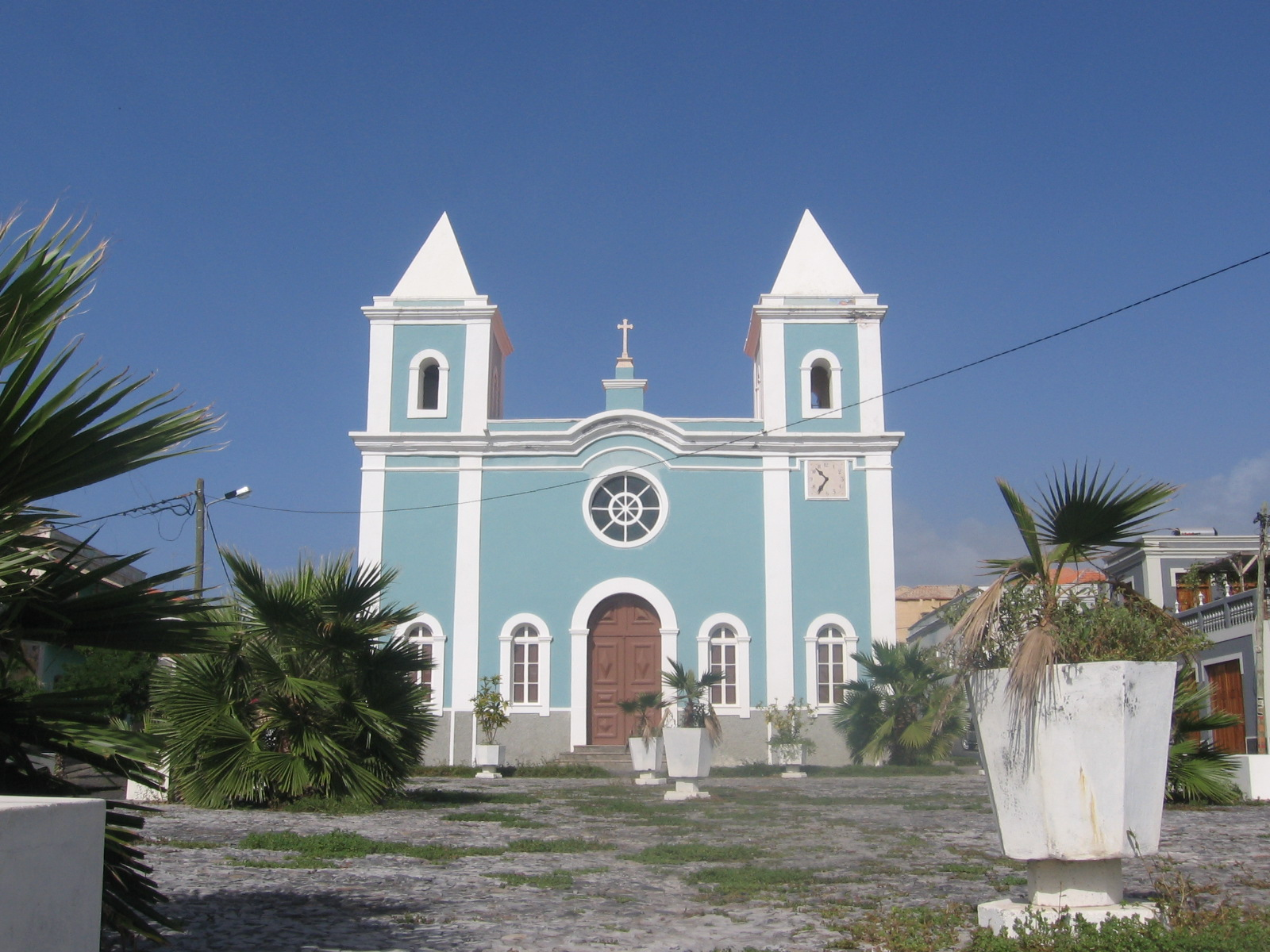
- Nossa Senhora da Conceição (Our Lady of Conception church), headquarters of the parish

- Location within Cape Verde
- Coordinates: 14.89°N 24.43°W
- Country: Cape Verde
- Island: Fogo
- Municipality: São Filipe

Population (2010)
  - Total: 13,328
- ID: 822

Nossa Senhora da Conceição is a freguesia (civil parish) of Cape Verde. It covers the southern part of the municipality of São Filipe, on the island of Fogo. The freguesia consists of the following settlements:

== Settlements ==
The freguesia consists of the following settlements, its population data was of the 2010 census:

- Brandão (pop: 198)
- Cabeça do Monte (pop: 282)
- Curral Ochô (pop: 210)
- Cutelo (pop: 126)
- Forno (pop: 323)
- Jardim (pop: 322)
- Lacacã (pop: 153)
- Lagariça (pop: 407)
- Luzia Nunes (pop: 438)
- Miguel Gonçalves (pop: 119)
- Monte Grande (pop: 743)
- Monte Largo (pop: 274)
- Patim (pop: 876, town)
- Salto (pop: 116)
- São Filipe (pop: 8,122, city)
- Tongom (pop: 367)
- Vicente Dias (pop: 242)
