= Vermelho Novo =

Brazilian municipality located in the state of Minas Gerais

Coordinates: 20°01′S 42°17′W

- Municipality
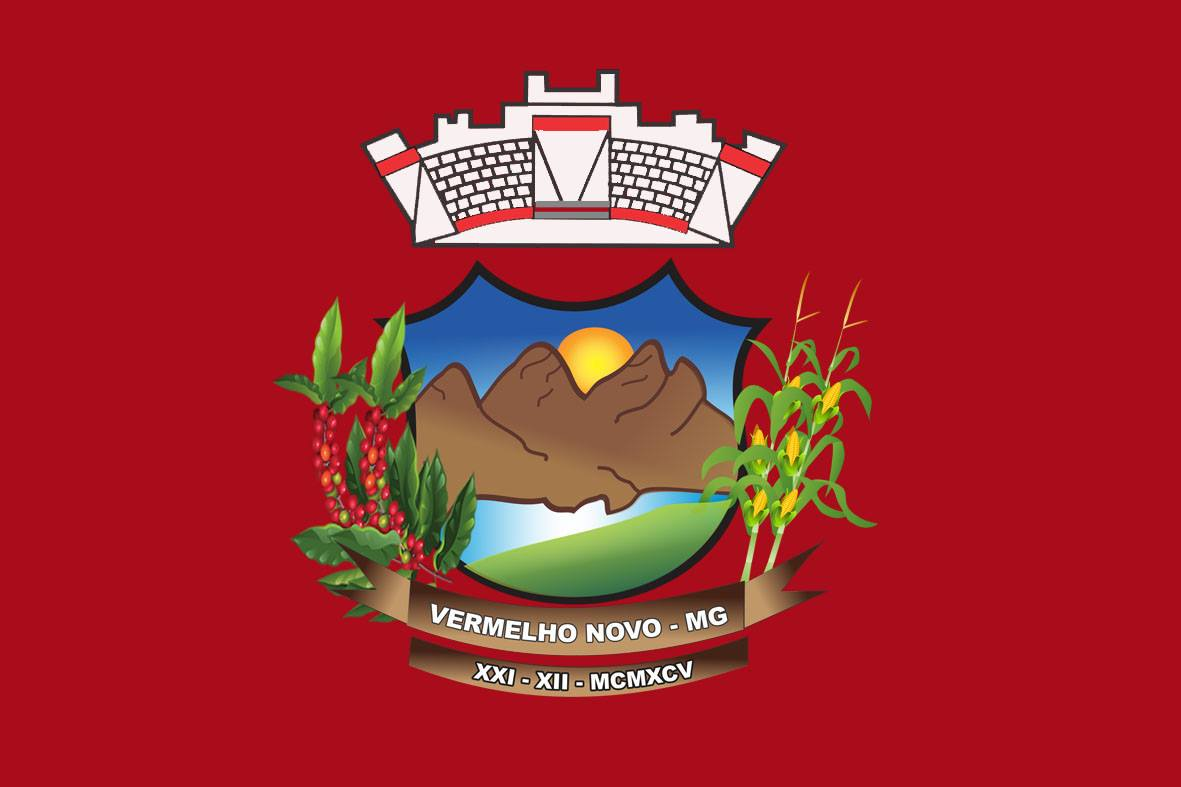
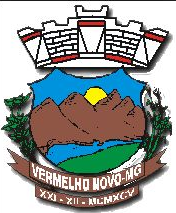
- Flag Coat of arms
- Interactive map of Vermelho Novo
- Country: Brazil
- State: Minas Gerais
- Region: Southeast
- Time zone: UTC−3 (BRT)

Location of Vermelho Novo within Minas Gerais

Vermelho Novo is a Brazilian municipality located in the state of Minas Gerais. The city belongs to the mesoregion of Zona da Mata and to the microregion of Ponte Nova. As of 2020, the estimated population was 4,846.

== History ==
The village of Vermelho Novo was founded in the mid-nineteenth century by the family Pinto. Its name originated due to the amount of red leaves falling on the little river giving it a reddish appearance.

Originated from this town important personalities, such as priest Manoel Moreira de Abreu, considered by its inhabitants miracle and Miguel Moreira de Abreu who written a small booklet about the history of the town.

== Geography ==
Vermelho Novo is near the towns of Caratinga (approximately 50 km) and Raul Soares (approximately 42 km). The access to the town is given by the BR 116. Coming to the district of Dom Correa (municipality of Manhuaçu) enter into a dirt road. After a long mountain comes to town. Its main means of subsistence is agriculture, particularly coffee.

== Education ==
The town has two schools: one belongs to municipality "Escola Municipal Padre Manoel Moreira de Abreu", until the fourth grade, and another state to the high school, the "Escola Estadual Farmacêutico Soares".

Access to higher education takes place in the city of Caratinga with the "Centro Universitário de Caratinga" and "Faculdades Integradas de Caratinga". There are students in various courses, like Accounting Sciences, Medicine, Nursing, Social Services, Law, Civil Engineering among others. The Higher Education made very recently.

== See also ==
- List of municipalities in Minas Gerais
