= Monte Grande (Fogo) =

- Settlement
- Coordinates: 14.891°N 24.407°W
- Country: Cape Verde
- Island: Fogo
- Municipality: São Filipe
- Civil parish: Nossa Senhora da Conceição

Population (2010)
  - Total: 743
- ID: 82207

Monte Grande is a settlement in the central part of the island of Fogo, Cape Verde. It is situated at about 900 m in elevation, 10 km east of the island capital São Filipe. In 2010 its population was 743. Nearby places include Monte Largo to the southeast, Patim to the southwest and Miguel Gonçalves to the northwest.

== See also ==
- List of villages and settlements in Cape Verde
