= Lagariça =

- Settlement
- Coordinates: 14.919°N 24.452°W
- Country: Cape Verde
- Island: Fogo
- Municipality: São Filipe
- Civil parish: Nossa Senhora da Conceição

Population (2010)
  - Total: 407
- ID: 82204

Lagariça (Portuguese pronunciation: [lɐɣɐˈɾisɐ]) is a settlement in the western part of the island of Fogo, Cape Verde. It is situated 6 km northeast of the island capital São Filipe. One of its localities is named Coxo.

== See also ==
- List of villages and settlements in Cape Verde
