= Eunice Silva =

Minister for Infrastructure, Planning and Housing
- Incumbent
- Assumed office 22 June 2016
- Prime Minister: Ulisses Correia e Silva

Personal details
- Born: April 1956 (age 69–70) Santiago, Cape Verde
- Children: 2
- Occupation: Civil engineer, writer, politician

Eunice Silva (born April 1956) is a Cape Verdean civil engineer, writer and politician from Santiago.

== Career ==
Eunice Andrade da Silva Spencer Lopes was born on Santiago, Cape Verde in April 1956 and was the second-eldest of nine siblings. She attended the Technical and Industrial Institute in Rostov, Russia and graduated with a bachelor's degree in civil engineering in 1980. Returning to Cape Verde in 1981 Silva joined the state-owned construction company and also became a member of the Organization of Cape Verdean Women (OCVW), a women's rights campaign group. She studied economics at the University of Havana, Cuba in 1995 and gained a Master of Business Administration degree from the Central Connecticut State University in 2001.

Upon returning to Cape Verde Silva joined the Ministry for Infrastructure, Planning and Housing, having resigned her membership of OCVW. She was director of the ministry's studies and planning office and sat on its public and private works permits commission. Silva later entered the private sector and became secretary-general of the country's contractors association.

Silva was elected to the National Assembly in 2011. She has since served as vice-president of the Economic, Environment and Spatial Planning Specialized Commission. and president of the Cape Verde Parliamentary Network for the Environment, Combating Desertification and Poverty. Silva arranged a nationwide vote in 2013 to determine Cape Verde's seven greatest wonders and subsequently produced the Cape Verde Wonders catalogue. She was in charge of the response to the 2014–15 eruption of Fogo, including provision of housing, money and employment to those affected. Silva also presided over the parliamentary inquiry into the loss of the Vicente ferry on 8 January 2015 which caused the deaths of 15 people.

On 22 June 2016 Silva was appointed Minister for Infrastructure, Planning and Housing in the Movement for Democracy cabinet of Ulisses Correia e Silva.

Silva is also vice-president of the Alliance of Parliamentarians and Local Elected Representatives for the Protection of the Environment in Countries on the West African Coast (APPEL), a grouping of elected officials of the members of the Subregional Fisheries Commission (Cape Verde, The Gambia, Guinea, Guinea-Bissau, Mauritania, Senegal, Sierra Leone).

Silva has written for Cape Verde newspapers on matters of urban planning and society. She is married, has two children and three grandchildren.
