= Luzia Nunes =

- Settlement
- Coordinates: 14.8742°N 24.439°W
- Country: Cape Verde
- Island: Fogo
- Municipality: São Filipe
- Civil parish: Nossa Senhora da Conceição

Population (2010)
  - Total: 438
- ID: 82205

Luzia Nunes is a settlement in the southwestern part of the island of Fogo, Cape Verde. It is situated 1.5 km west of Patim, 2 km southeast of Vicente Dias and 7 km southeast of the island capital São Filipe. At the 2010 census its population was 438.

== See also ==
- List of villages and settlements in Cape Verde
