= Patim =

- Settlement
- Coordinates: 14.876°N 24.424°W
- Country: Cape Verde
- Island: Fogo
- Municipality: São Filipe
- Civil parish: Nossa Senhora da Conceição
- Elevation: 535 m (1,755 ft)

Population (2010)
  - Total: 876
- ID: 82208

Patim is a town in the southwestern part of the island of Fogo, Cape Verde. It is situated 8 km southeast of the island capital São Filipe. At the 2010 census its population was 876. Its elevation is 535 meters. It is 2 km east of Luzia Nunes and 2.5 km southwest of Monte Grande. Its climate is arid. Average temperature is 20.5 °C. Average precipitation is 268 mm.

== See also ==
- List of cities and towns in Cape Verde
