= Vicente Dias =

- Settlement
- Coordinates: 14.893°N 24.451°W
- Country: Cape Verde
- Island: Fogo
- Municipality: São Filipe
- Civil parish: Nossa Senhora da Conceição

Population (2010)
  - Total: 242
- ID: 82211

Vicente Dias is a settlement in the western part of the island of Fogo, Cape Verde. It is situated 2 km northwest of Luzia Nunes and 5 km east of the island capital São Filipe.

== See also ==
- List of villages and settlements in Cape Verde
