= Vermelho Velho =

Village in Raul Soares, Minas Gerais, Brazil

Coordinates: 19°59′S 42°20′W

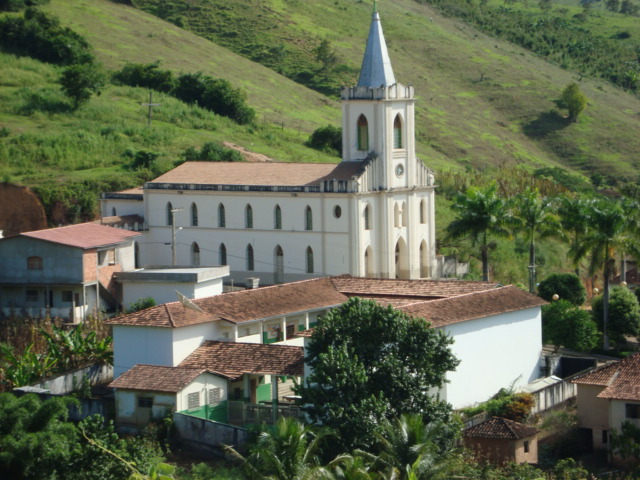
Vermelho Velho in 2006

Vermelho Velho is a village in the municipality of Raul Soares, state of Minas Gerais, in Brazil.

== History ==
Vermelho Velho, district of Raul Soares, is located east of Minas Gerais, which in turn is located within the Southeast Region. The town is 25 km from Raul Soares and 25 km of Bom Jesus do Galho and has existed for around 150 years. The climate is very pleasant. Its name means "Ancient Red," possibly as a reflection of the colour of the soil beneath the town. A railway connection was established to Raul Soares in 1930, and the Caratinga to Raul Soares highway, BR 116, also passes through the town. The predominant religion was Roman Catholicism and, since 1932, Protestantism. Local agriculture includes rice, maize, coffee, cassava and sugar cane. The single largest contributor to the economy is coffee production, for both domestic and export markets.

The district was founded in January 20, 1924. In 1943 Vermelho Velho was transferred to the municipality of Bom Jesus do Galho, but five years later it was transferred back to Raul Soares.
