= Monte Largo =

- Settlement
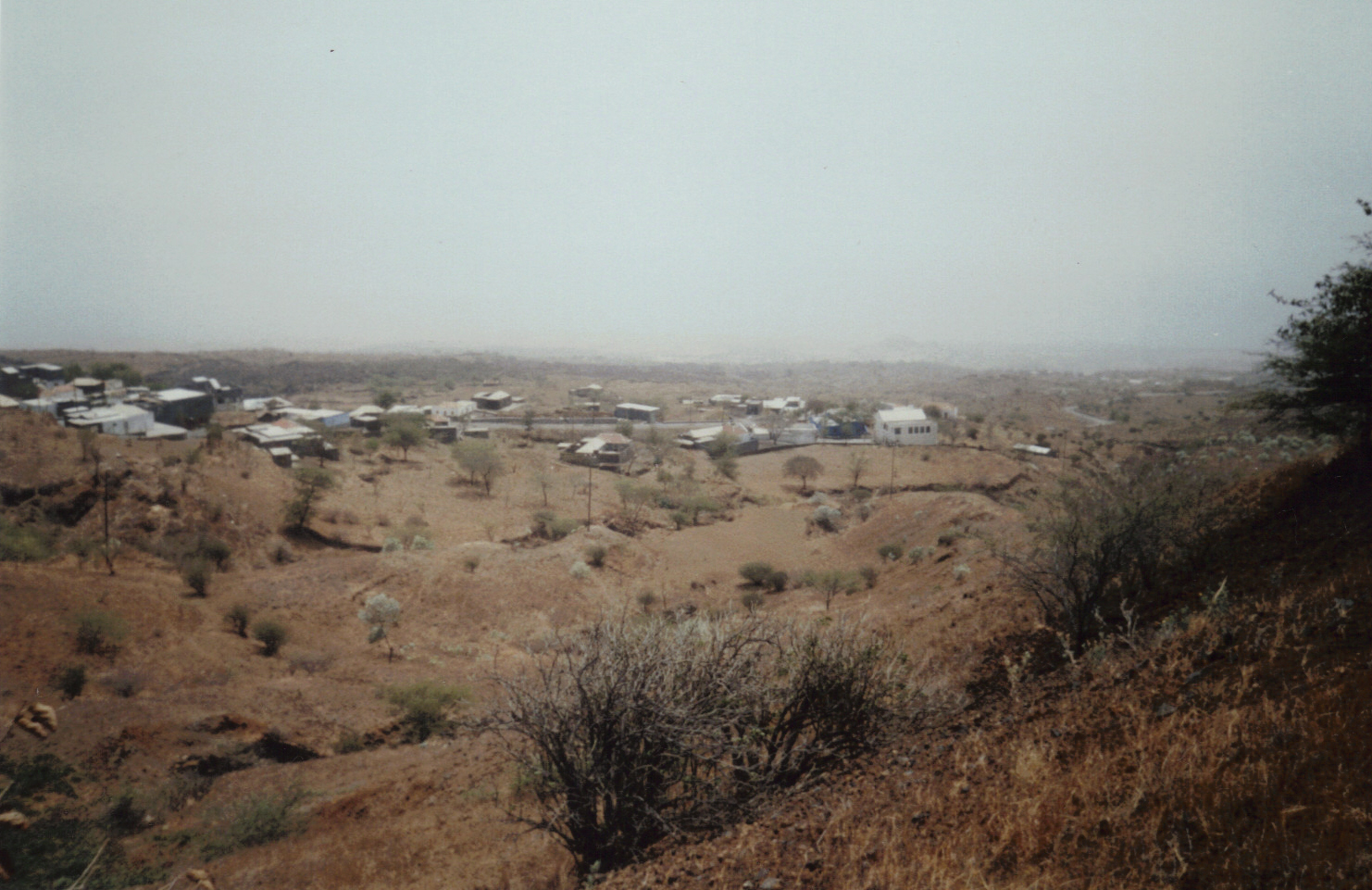
- Settlement of Monte Largo

- Location within Cape Verde
- Coordinates: 14°52′07″N 24°23′00″W
- Country: Cape Verde
- Island: Fogo
- Municipality: São Filipe
- Civil parish: Nossa Senhora da Conceição

Population (2010)
  - Total: 274
- ID: 82206

Monte Largo is a settlement in the southern part of the island of Fogo, Cape Verde. It is situated 1.5 km northeast of Salto, 3 km southeast of Monte Grande, 3 km west of Achada Furna and 13 kilometres (8.1 mi) east of the island capital São Filipe. At the 2010 census its population was 274. Its elevation is about 800 meters.

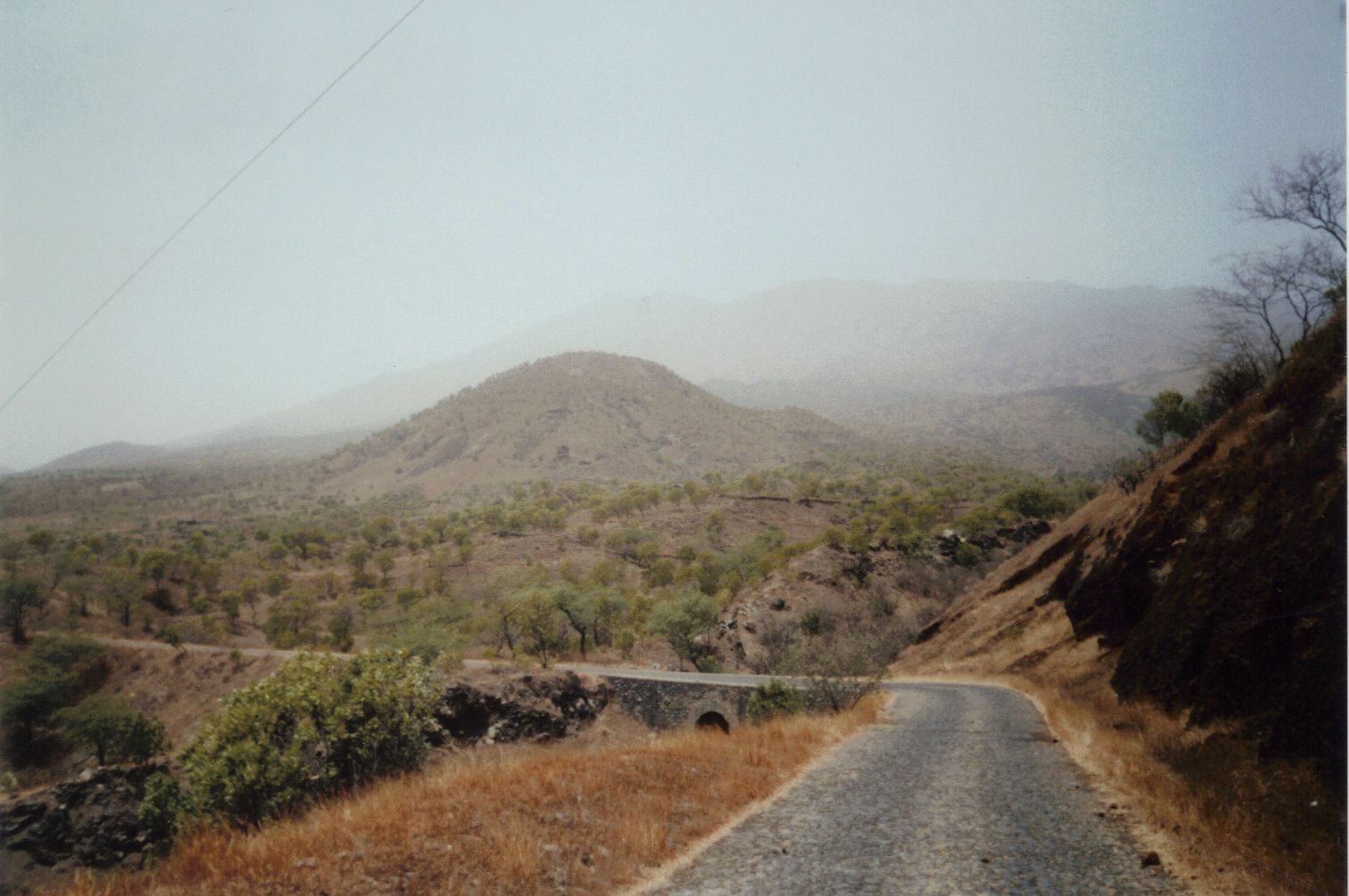
View of Monte Largo with the Crater of Pico do Fogo

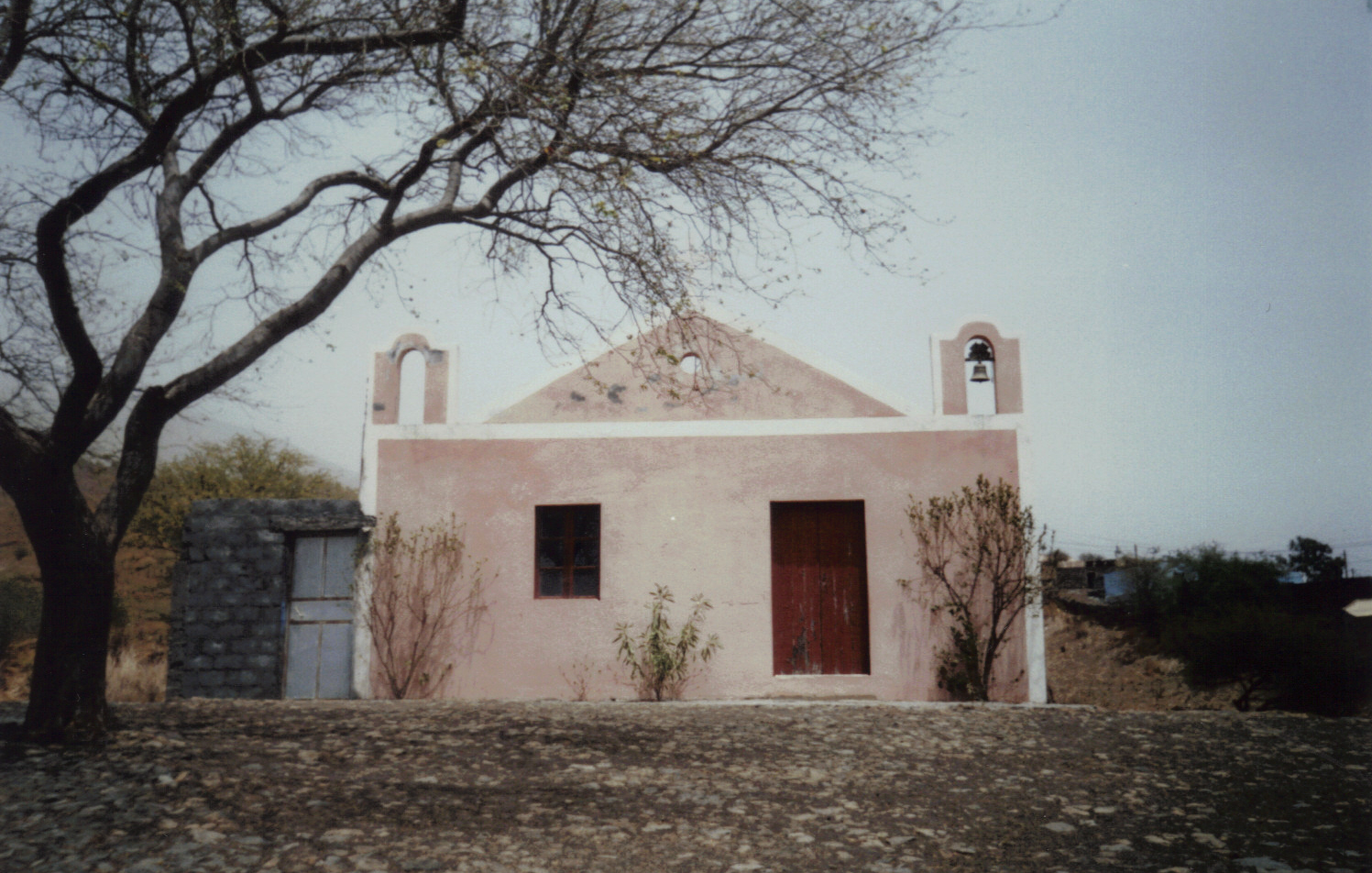
Town church

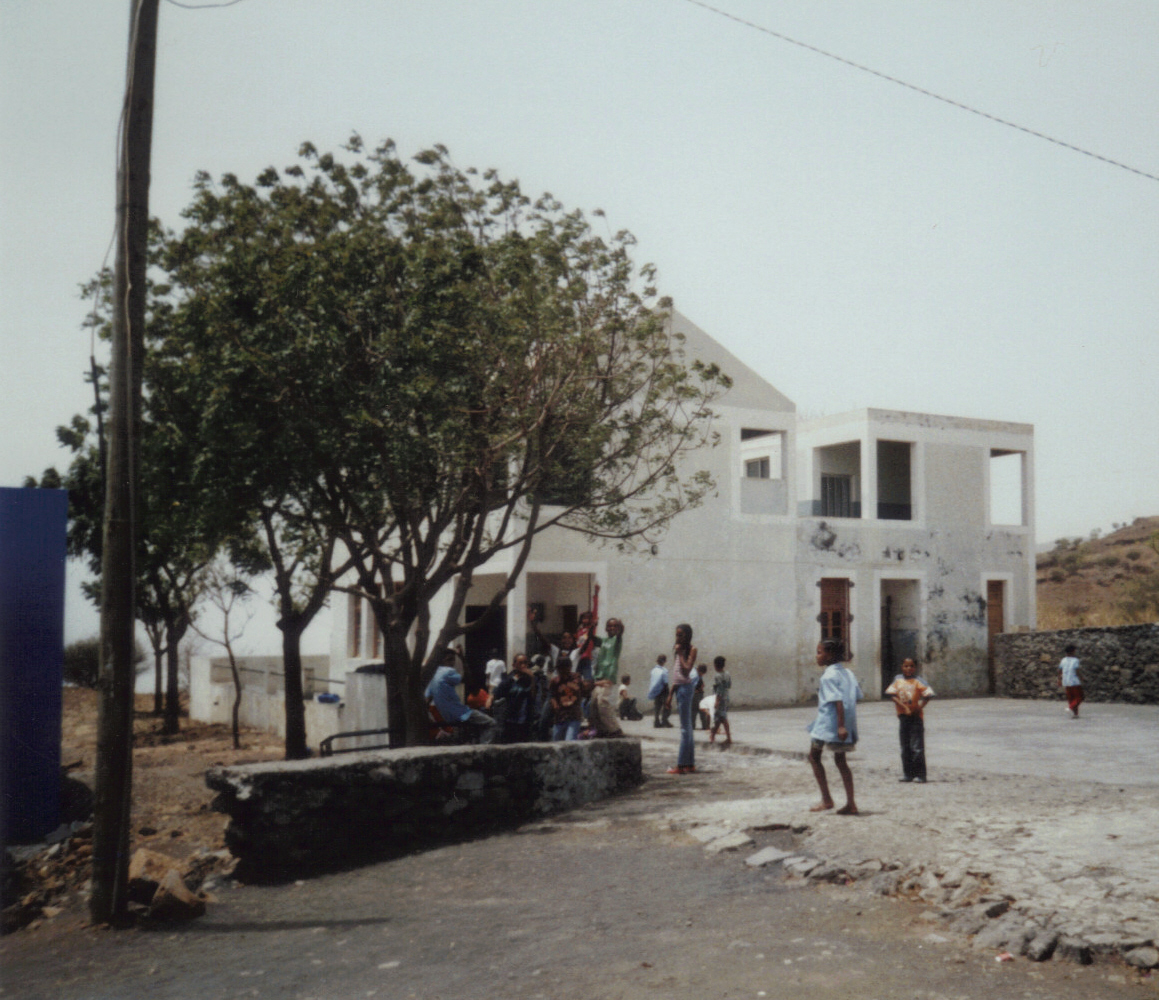
Town school

== See also ==
- List of villages and settlements in Cape Verde
