= Estância Roque =

- Settlement
- Coordinates: 14.897°N 24.319°W
- Country: Cape Verde
- Island: Fogo
- Municipality: Santa Catarina do Fogo
- Civil parish: Santa Catarina do Fogo

Population (2010)
  - Total: 411
- ID: 83104

Estância Roque is a settlement in the eastern part of the island of Fogo, Cape Verde. In 2010 its population was 411. It is situated 3 km west of Cova Figueira and 19 km east of the island capital São Filipe. Nearby places include Figueira Pavão in the south and Cabeça Fundão in the northwest.

== See also ==
- List of villages and settlements in Cape Verde
