= Cuparaque =

Coordinates: 18°58′S 41°06′W

- Municipality
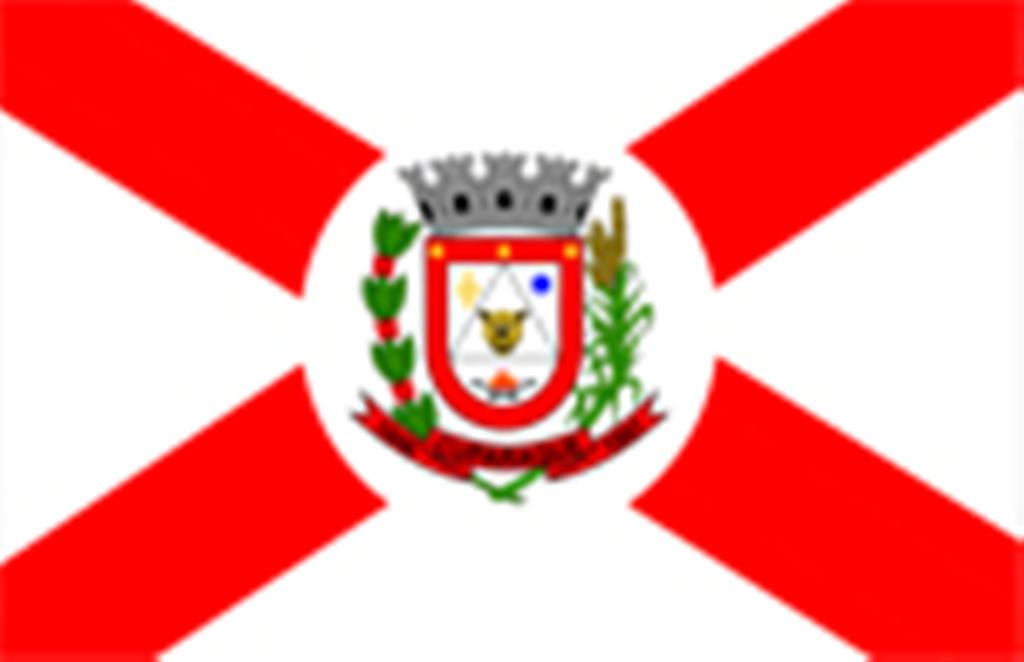
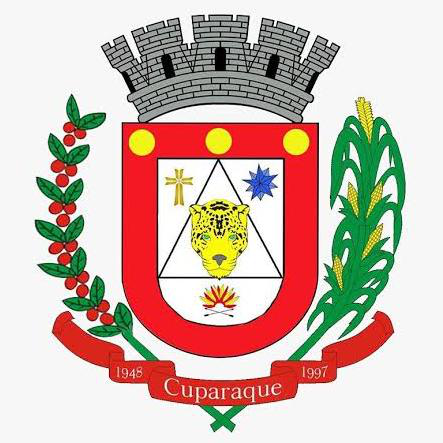
- Flag Coat of arms
- Interactive map of Cuparaque
- Country: Brazil
- Region: Southeast
- State: Minas Gerais
- Mesoregion: Vale do Rio Doce

Population (2022 Census)
  - Total: 3,983
  - Estimate (2025): 3,958
- Time zone: UTC−3 (BRT)

Cuparaque is a municipality in the state of Minas Gerais in the Southeast region of Brazil.

== See also ==
- List of municipalities in Minas Gerais
