= Intermediate Geographic Region of Governador Valadares =

Interurban administrative region in Minas Gerais, Brazil

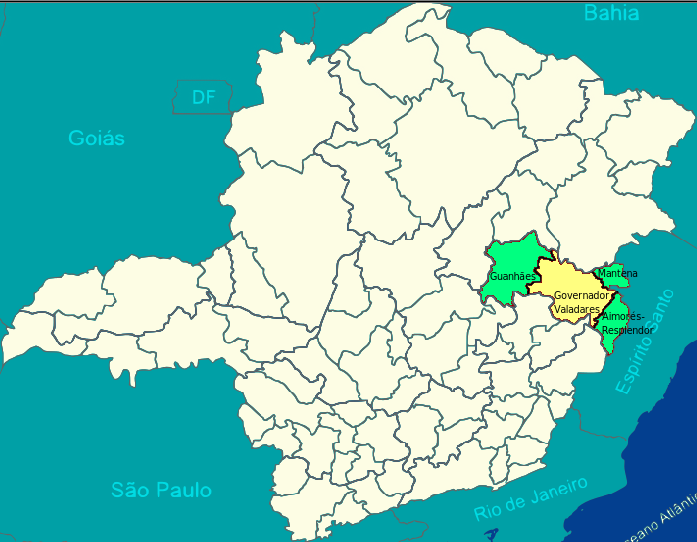
The Intermediate Geographic Region of Governador Valadares, in the state of Minas Gerais, Brazil.

The Intermediate Geographic Region of Governador Valadares (code 3104) is one of the 13 intermediate geographic regions in the Brazilian state of Minas Gerais and one of the 134 of Brazil, created by the National Institute of Geography and Statistics (IBGE) in 2017.

It comprises 58 municipalities, distributed in 4 immediate geographic regions:

- Immediate Geographic Region of Governador Valadares.
- Immediate Geographic Region of Guanhães.
- Immediate Geographic Region of Mantena.
- Immediate Geographic Region of Aimorés-Resplendor.

== See also ==
- List of Intermediate and Immediate Geographic Regions of Minas Gerais
