= Miguel Gonçalves =

- Settlement
- Coordinates: 14.907°N 24.425°W
- Country: Cape Verde
- Island: Fogo
- Municipality: São Filipe
- Civil parish: Nossa Senhora da Conceição

Population (2010)
  - Total: 119
- ID: 82298

Miguel Gonçalves is a settlement in the central part of the island of Fogo, Cape Verde. It is situated at about 850 m elevation, 8 km east of the island capital São Filipe.

== See also ==
- List of villages and settlements in Cape Verde
