= Salto, Cape Verde =

Salto
- Settlement
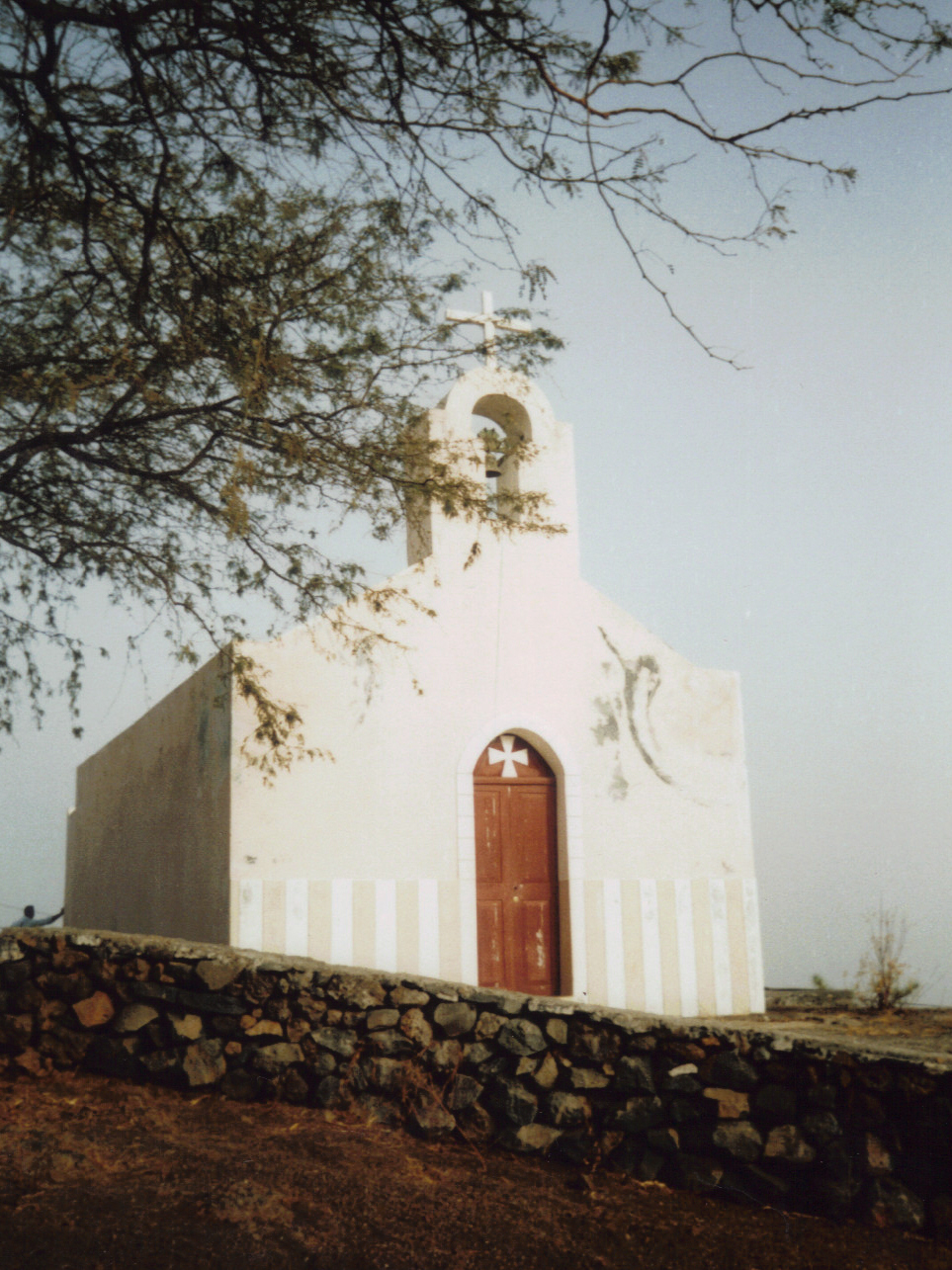
- Church of Salto.

- Location within Cape Verde
- Coordinates: 14.855°N 24.392°W
- Country: Cape Verde
- Island: Fogo
- Municipality: São Filipe
- Civil parish: Nossa Senhora da Conceição

Population (2010)
  - Total: 116
- ID: 82209

Salto is a settlement in the southern part of the island of Fogo, Cape Verde. It is situated 2 km (1.2 mi) southwest of Monte Largo and12 km (7.5 mi) southeast of the island capital São Filipe. The village has a sightworthy church and some small shops, but no accommodation for tourists. Most of the inhabitants are farmers growing potatoes, vegetables and papayas. Several fields are irrigated using drip irrigation. Many fields were surrounded by stone walls to protect them against erosion.

== Gallery ==
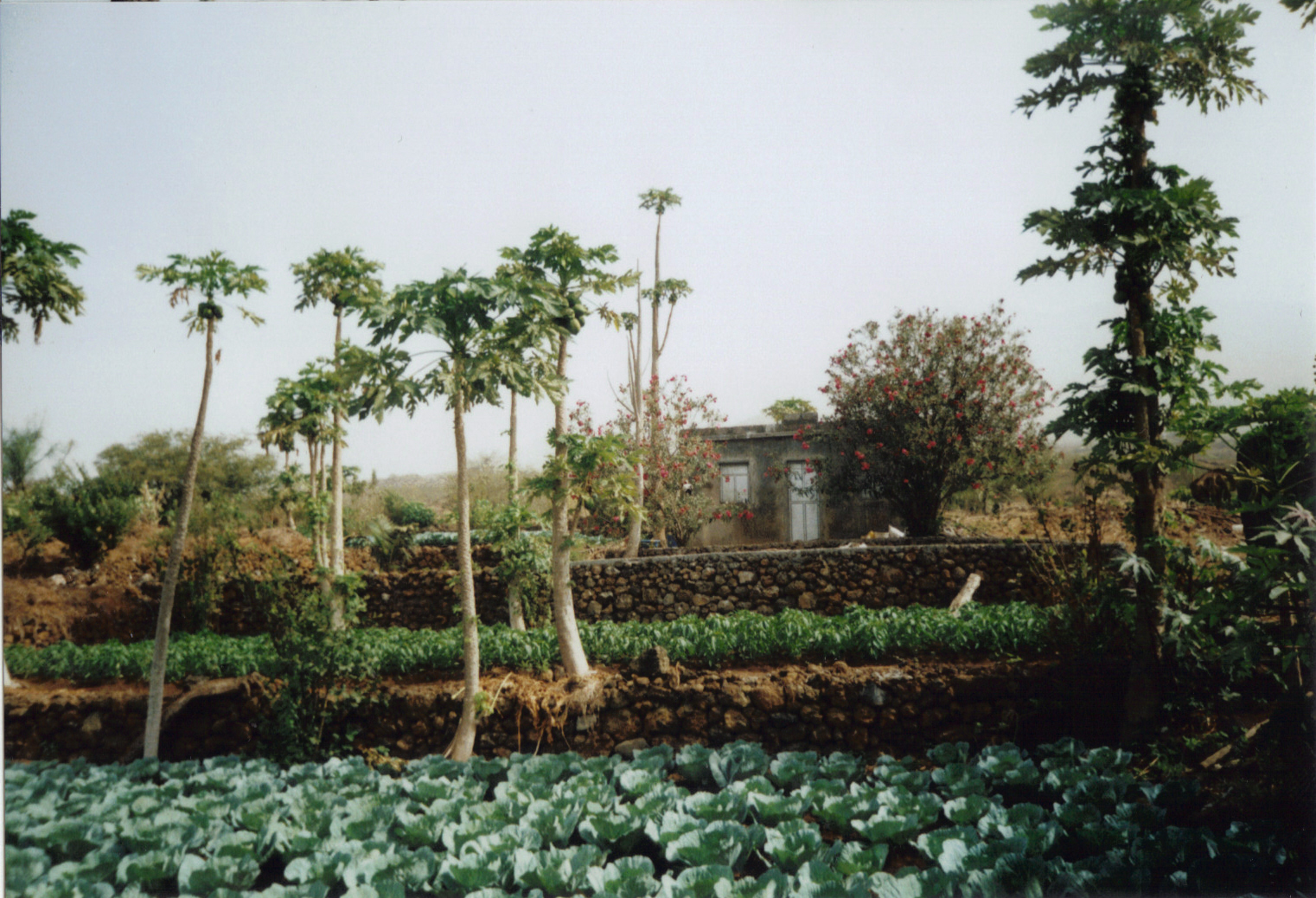
Farm using drip irrigation in Salto.

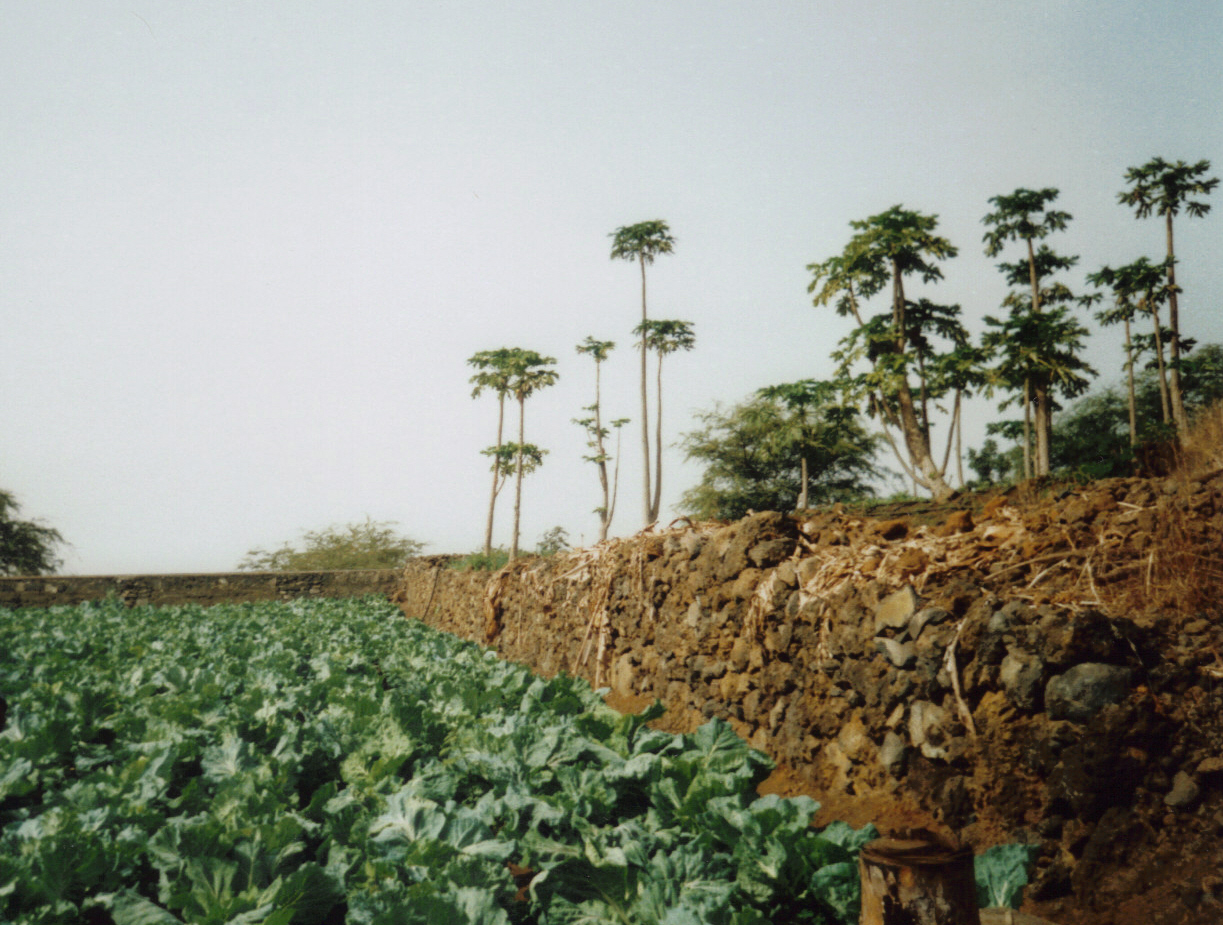
Field with drip irrigation in Salto.

== See also ==
- List of villages and settlements in Cape Verde
