= Santa Rita do Itueto =

- Municipality
- Coat of arms

- Location in Brazil
- Coordinates: 19°21′36″S 41°22′48″W
- Country: Brazil
- Region: Southeast
- State: Minas Gerais
- Mesoregion: Vale do Rio Doce

Population (2022 Census----->)
  - Total: 5,826
  - Estimate (2025): 5,984
- Time zone: UTC−3 (BRT)

Santa Rita do Itueto is a municipality in the state of Minas Gerais in the Southeast region of Brazil.

== See also ==
- List of municipalities in Minas Gerais
