= Raul Soares =

Municipality in Minas Gerais, Brazil

Coordinates: 20°06′08″S 42°27′12″W

- Municipality
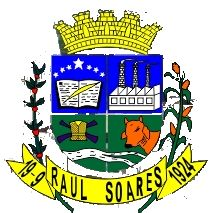
- Coat of arms
- Interactive map of Raul Soares
- Country: Brazil
- State: Minas Gerais
- Region: Southeast
- Time zone: UTC−3 (BRT)

Location of Raul Soares within Minas Gerais

Raul Soares is a Brazilian municipality located in the state of Minas Gerais. The city belongs to the mesoregion of Zona da Mata and extends to the microregion of Ponte Nova. As of 2020, the estimated population was 23,711.

== History ==
The Boachás, who populated the rich mountains near the river that inherited their name, were the first people to settle in the area.

The pioneers Domingos de Lana and Cassimiro de Lana arrived in Raul Soares on January 20, 1837, from Mariana. Upon their arrival, they expelled the native population, and took possession of the mountains. In 1841, the territory was sold to Francisco Alves do Vale, who settled there with his family. According to a deed dated October 29, 1873, João Pinto de Oliveira, a wealthy man, donated five acres of land. The village formed out of this land was called São Sebastião do Entre Rios for its location between the Matipó and Santana rivers. The town grew slowly and in 1902, the district of Rio Casca was formed.

The creation of the municipality of Raul Soares was authorised by State Law No. 843 on September 7, 1923, and the region became formally known as Matipó. Initially, the consolidation council was composed of individuals who would exercise executive and legislative powers. But as the Mayor and City Council formed with the people's consent, a broader municipality was created. In 1924, the local council accepted the name for the area as Raul Soares, in honour of then Governor of State, Dr. Raul Soares de Moura.

The new municipality was formally installed on January 20, 1924, under the direction of the first elected councilmen and with the creation of the first town hall. Joaquim Miracles Sobrinho (who chaired the inaugural session as the most voted alderman), João Domingos da Silva, Raphael Raymundo Coelho, José Maria de Souza, Francisco Costa Abrantes, Joaquim José da Silveira and Carlos Gomes Brandão were members of governing body of the new council. Councilman Raymundo Raphael Coelho was the chairman of the elected municipal council. At that time there was no mayor and the president of the chamber had to perform both functions. January 20 was celebrated as independence day, and is the anniversary of the emancipation policy. On September 19, 1924, the administrative council changed the day's name to Matipó of Raul Soares. It is also the day of patron saint San Sebastian.

After Oliveria's death in 1925, his children – José, Jacó, Francisco and Manoel Alves do Vale – donated part of the land to create the chapel of St. Sebastian (Minas Gerais). The original chapel was founded by Father Francisco Antonio de Carvalho, a vicar of São Pedro dos Ferros, who later moved to live near the church.

The city serves as headquarters of the manufacturing company St. Sebastian Industrial SA. The region is also a significant producer of coffee. A considerable portion of the area's industrial and agricultural output is exported worldwide.

== Villages ==
- Bicuíba
- Cornélio Alves
- Granada
- Santana do Tabuleiro
- São Vicente da Estrela
- São Sebastião do Óculo
- Vermelho Velho

== Tourism ==
The municipality has options for many tourist profiles, some of which are places structured for tourism, and some are not. Some of which charge admittance fee, and some do not.

Information about some places often visited by inhabitants and tourists of Raul Soares have been collected by RaulSô app, and are listed below.

=== Onde visitar em Raul Soares ===
- Non-structured waterfalls: Emboque, Tarza e Prefac
- Lagoa do Emboque
- Morro do Tico Tico
- Children playground of Alphaville and Vila Barbosa
- Waterpark Minas Beach
- Commercial fishing pond of Fundaça
- Cultura square, The Former Train Station and monuments
- Pico do Boachá
- Heritages: Santuário São Sebastião and Praça do Coreto
- Sítio Dona Inácia

== See also ==
- List of municipalities in Minas Gerais
