= Immediate Geographic Region of Mantena =

Urban administrative region in Minas Gerais, Brazil

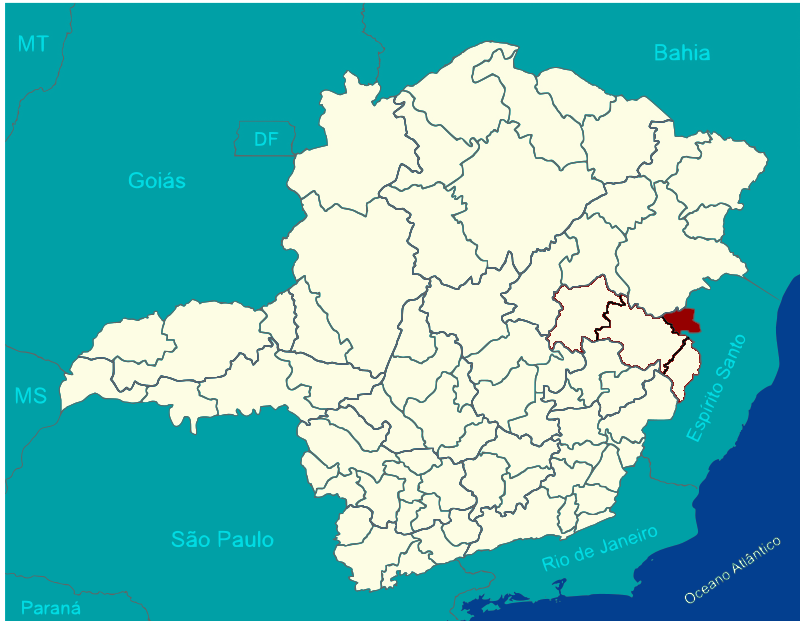
Immediate Geographic Region of Mantena, in the state of Minas Gerais, Brazil.

The Immediate Geographic Region of Mantena is one of the 4 immediate geographic regions in the Intermediate Geographic Region of Governador Valadares, one of the 70 immediate geographic regions in the Brazilian state of Minas Gerais and one of the 509 of Brazil, created by the National Institute of Geography and Statistics (IBGE) in 2017.

== Municipalities ==
It comprises 7 municipalities.

- Central de Minas
- Itabirinha
- Mantena
- Mendes Pimentel
- Nova Belém
- São Félix de Minas
- São João do Manteninha
