= Tinteira =

- Settlement
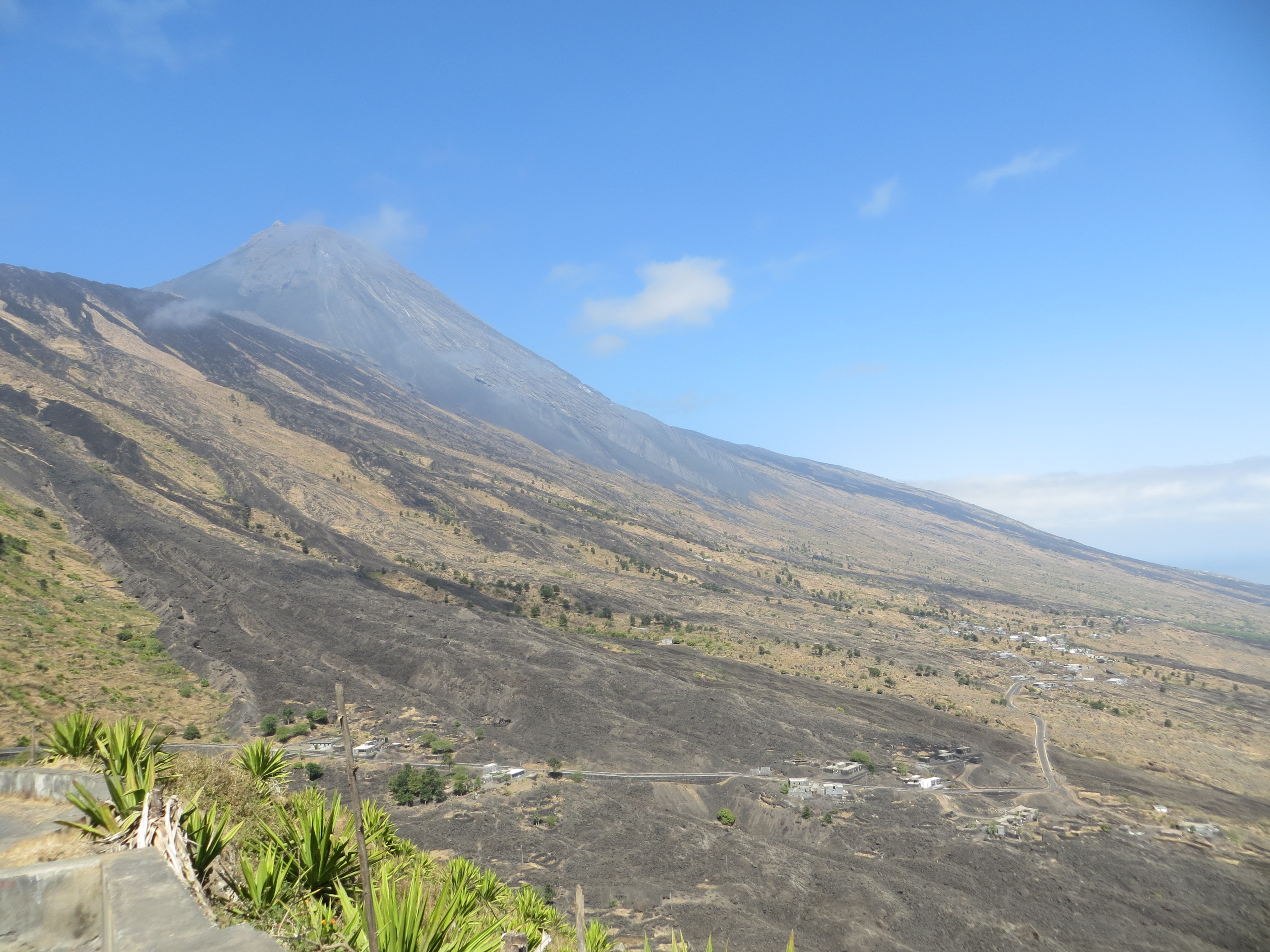
- View of Tinteira with Cova Matinho, the center of Tinteira is near the middle right

- Location within Cape Verde
- Coordinates: 14.9288°N 24.2968°W
- Country: Cape Verde
- Island: Fogo
- Municipality: Santa Catarina do Fogo
- Civil parish: Santa Catarina do Fogo

Population (2010)
  - Total: 410
- ID: 83108

Tinteira is a settlement in the eastern part of the island of Fogo, Cape Verde. It is situated 4 km north of Cova Figueira, 5 km south of Relva and 22 km east of the island capital São Filipe. At the 2010 census its population was 410. Its elevation is 300 meters. Tinteira consists of the localities Tinteira, Cova Matinho and Cutelo Capado.

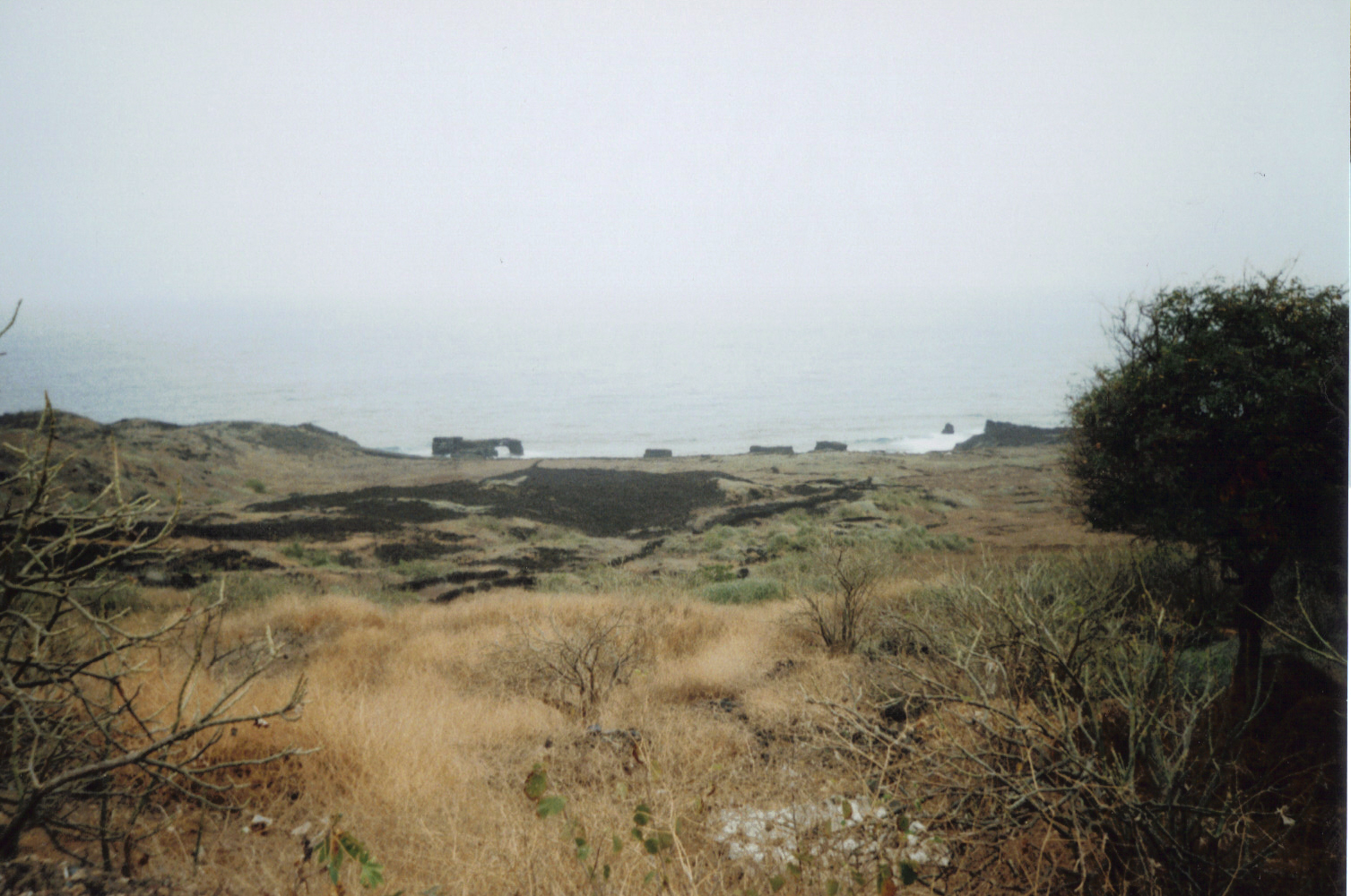
Praia Casa just east of Cova Matinho and Tinteira

== See also ==
- List of villages and settlements in Cape Verde
