= Cova Figueira =

- Settlement
- Location within Cape Verde
- Coordinates: 14.890°N 24.294°W
- Country: Cape Verde
- Island: Fogo
- Municipality: Santa Catarina do Fogo
- Civil parish: Santa Catarina do Fogo

Population (2010)
  - Total: 1,230
- Postal code: 8210, 8235
- ID: 83103

Cova Figueira is a city in the southeastern part of the island of Fogo, Cape Verde. In 2010 its population was 1,230, making it the most populated place in the municipality. It is situated 22 km east of the island capital São Filipe. Since 2005, it serves as the seat of Santa Catarina do Fogo Municipality. Its elevation is 480 meters above sea level. The volcano Pico do Fogo is 7.7 km to the northwest. Nearby places include Figueira Pavão in the southwest, Mãe Joana and Estância Roque in the west and Tinteira in the north. Cova Figueira was elevated to a city in 2010.

== Climate ==
Its climate is arid. Average temperature is 20.8 °C. Average precipitation is 324 mm.

== Sport clubs ==
Desportivo de Cova Figueira is an association football team currently playing in the Fogo Island Second Division. Other clubs based in the town are Baxada and Parque Real. All of its matches are played at Estádio Monte Pelado which is located at the south end of the city near Ribeira de Coxo.

== See also ==
- List of villages and settlements in Cape Verde
