= Immediate Geographic Region of Guanhães =

Urban administrative region in Minas Gerais, Brazil

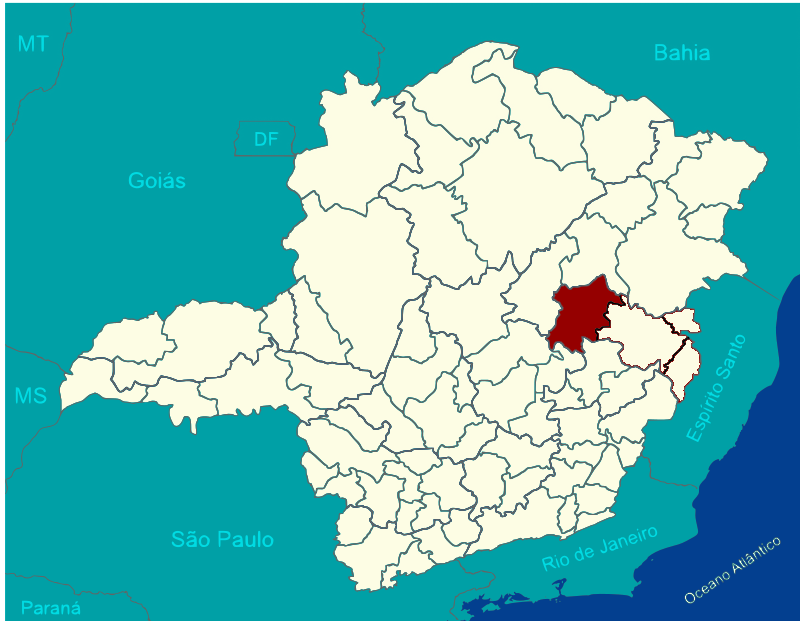
Immediate Geographic Region of Guanhães, in the state of Minas Gerais, Brazil.

The Immediate Geographic Region of Guanhães is one of the 4 immediate geographic regions in the Intermediate Geographic Region of Governador Valadares, one of the 70 immediate geographic regions in the Brazilian state of Minas Gerais and one of the 509 of Brazil, created by the National Institute of Geography and Statistics (IBGE) in 2017.

== Municipalities ==
It comprises 20 municipalities.

- Cantagalo
- Coluna
- Divinolândia de Minas
- Dom Joaquim
- Dores de Guanhães
- Frei Lagonegro
- Guanhães
- José Raydan
- Materlândia
- Paulistas
- Peçanha
- Rio Vermelho
- Sabinópolis
- Santa Maria do Suaçuí
- São João Evangelista
- São José do Jacuri
- São Pedro do Suaçuí
- São Sebastião do Maranhão
- Senhora do Porto
- Virginópolis
