= Achada Furna =

- Settlement
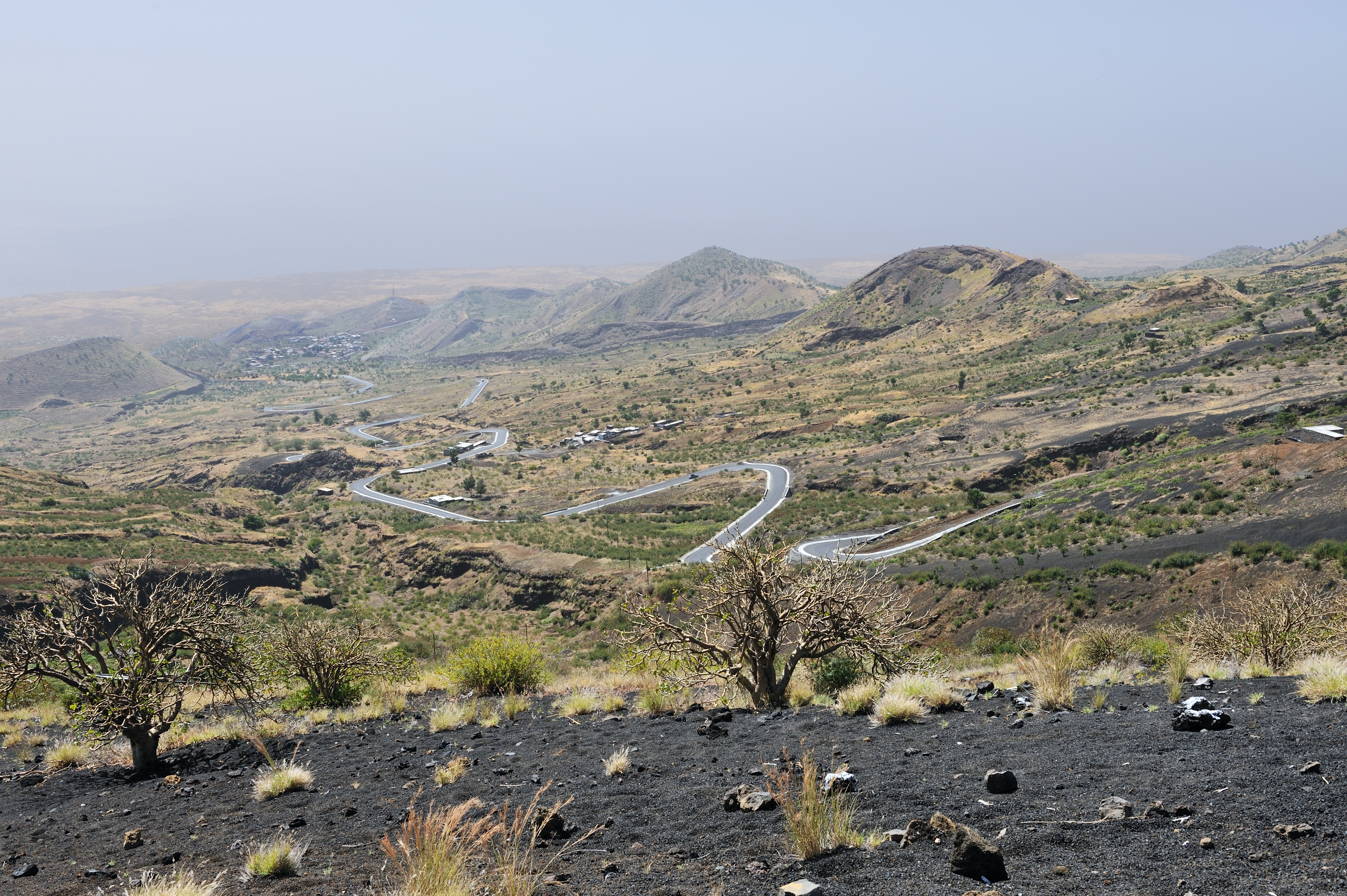
- Panoramic view of the south of the island, on the left is Achada Furna and surrounding it are small hills.

- Location within Cape Verde
- Coordinates: 14.873°N 24.359°W
- Country: Cape Verde
- Island: Fogo
- Municipality: Santa Catarina do Fogo
- Civil parish: Santa Catarina do Fogo

Population (2010)
  - Total: 495
- ID: 83101

Achada Furna (Portuguese pronunciation: [ɐˈʃaðɐ ˈfuɾnɐ]) is a settlement in the southern part of the island of Fogo, Cape Verde. It is situated 15 km east of the island capital São Filipe. At the 2010 census its population was 495. Its elevation is about 870 meters. Nearby places include Cabeça Fundão to the north, Figueira Pavão to the east, Fonte Aleixo to the south and Monte Largo to the west.

== Climate ==
Its climate is cooler than the low-lying areas of the island. The average temperature is 18.5 °C (65.3 °F). Average rainfall is 366 millimeters, the highest is 149 mm in September and the lowest is without a single precipitation between the months of March and May.

Climate data for Achada Furna, 874 metres ASL
Month	Jan	Feb	Mar	Apr	May	Jun	Jul	Aug	Sep	Oct	Nov	Dec	Year
Mean daily maximum °C (°F)	19.9 (67.8)	20.0 (68.0)	20.7 (69.3)	21.1 (70.0)	21.6 (70.9)	22.2 (72.0)	22.8 (73.0)	23.2 (73.8)	23.7 (74.7)	23.5 (74.3)	22.7 (72.9)	20.6 (69.1)	21.8 (71.3)
Daily mean °C (°F)	16.7 (62.1)	16.5 (61.7)	17.1 (62.8)	17.4 (63.3)	18.1 (64.6)	18.7 (65.7)	19.5 (67.1)	20.2 (68.4)	20.6 (69.1)	20.7 (69.3)	19.4 (66.9)	17.8 (64.0)	18.6 (65.4)
Mean daily minimum °C (°F)	13.5 (56.3)	13.1 (55.6)	13.5 (56.3)	13.8 (56.8)	14.7 (58.5)	15.3 (59.5)	16.2 (61.2)	17.2 (63.0)	17.5 (63.5)	17.9 (64.2)	16.2 (61.2)	15.0 (59.0)	15.3 (59.6)
Average rainfall mm (inches)	3 (0.1)	3 (0.1)	0 (0)	0 (0)	0 (0)	1 (0.0)	22 (0.9)	115 (4.5)	149 (5.9)	51 (2.0)	14 (0.6)	8 (0.3)	366 (14.4)
Source: Climate-Data.ORG

== See also ==
- List of villages and settlements in Cape Verde
