= Aimorés =

Coordinates: 19°29′45″S 41°03′50″W

- Municipality
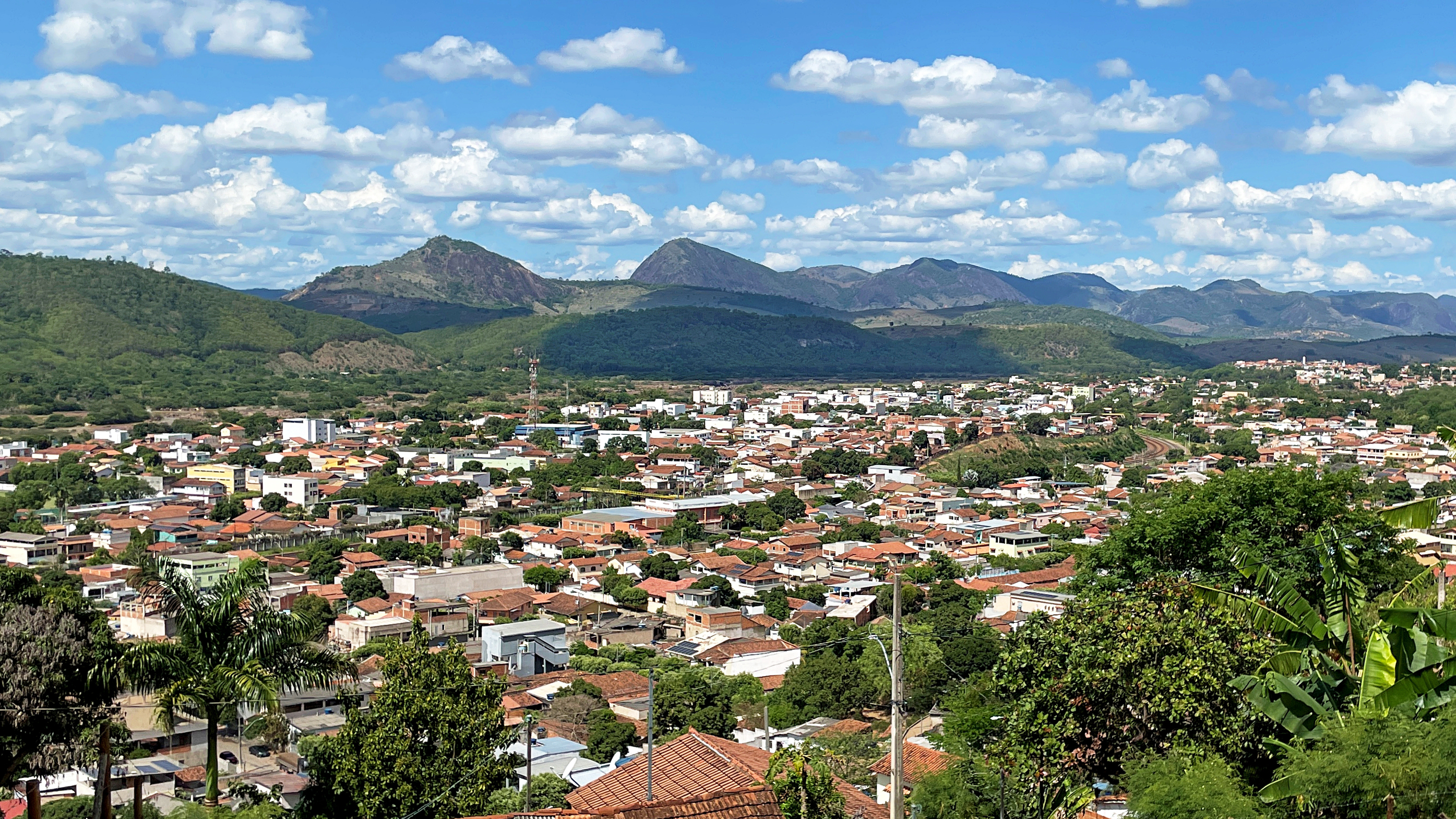
- Partial view of Aimorés seen from the Morro da Caixa d'Água

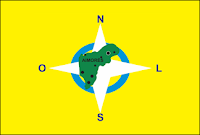
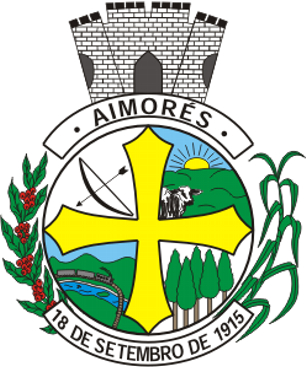
- Flag Coat of arms
- Nickname: "The Land of The Eternal Sun" (A terra do sol eterno)
- Country: Brazil
- State: Minas Gerais

Population (2022 Census)
  - Total: 25,269
  - Estimate (2025): 26,212

Aimorés is a municipality founded on 18 September 1925 in the countryside of Minas Gerais in the Rio Doce Valley, 440 km east to the state capital, Belo Horizonte. It has 1 348.913 km^{2} of area, with 8.2 km^{2} being in the urban perimeter. Its estimate population was 26,212 as of 2025.

== Geography ==
=== Climate ===
Climate data for Aimorés (1981–2010, extremes 1972–present)
Month	Jan	Feb	Mar	Apr	May	Jun	Jul	Aug	Sep	Oct	Nov	Dec	Year
Record high °C (°F)	40.8 (105.4)	41.0 (105.8)	40.0 (104.0)	38.2 (100.8)	37.8 (100.0)	35.2 (95.4)	38.2 (100.8)	37.0 (98.6)	42.5 (108.5)	40.0 (104.0)	40.6 (105.1)	39.6 (103.3)	42.5 (108.5)
Mean daily maximum °C (°F)	33.6 (92.5)	34.7 (94.5)	34.1 (93.4)	32.6 (90.7)	30.9 (87.6)	29.6 (85.3)	29.5 (85.1)	30.2 (86.4)	30.9 (87.6)	32.1 (89.8)	31.9 (89.4)	32.5 (90.5)	31.9 (89.4)
Daily mean °C (°F)	27.3 (81.1)	27.9 (82.2)	27.4 (81.3)	25.9 (78.6)	23.7 (74.7)	22.0 (71.6)	21.8 (71.2)	22.8 (73.0)	24.2 (75.6)	25.7 (78.3)	26.0 (78.8)	26.6 (79.9)	25.1 (77.2)
Mean daily minimum °C (°F)	22.9 (73.2)	23.0 (73.4)	22.8 (73.0)	21.3 (70.3)	18.8 (65.8)	16.8 (62.2)	16.4 (61.5)	17.3 (63.1)	19.3 (66.7)	21.1 (70.0)	22.0 (71.6)	22.5 (72.5)	20.4 (68.7)
Record low °C (°F)	12.5 (54.5)	15.1 (59.2)	16.5 (61.7)	12.2 (54.0)	9.9 (49.8)	9.1 (48.4)	9.1 (48.4)	9.8 (49.6)	11.0 (51.8)	10.3 (50.5)	13.1 (55.6)	14.0 (57.2)	9.1 (48.4)
Average precipitation mm (inches)	145.6 (5.73)	67.4 (2.65)	116.2 (4.57)	52.1 (2.05)	34.0 (1.34)	13.8 (0.54)	9.9 (0.39)	18.7 (0.74)	29.3 (1.15)	71.9 (2.83)	177.5 (6.99)	188.5 (7.42)	924.9 (36.41)
Average precipitation days (≥ 1.0 mm)	10	7	8	5	4	3	2	2	3	6	11	14	75
Average relative humidity (%)	75.9	72.1	73.8	74.9	73.2	72.5	70.7	69.2	70.2	70.6	76.1	77.8	73.1
Mean monthly sunshine hours	228.5	230.6	239.4	223.5	212.4	196.6	208.4	219.1	189.0	183.7	169.8	183.2	2,484.2
Source 1: Instituto Nacional de Meteorologia
Source 2: Meteo Climat (record highs and lows)
