= Cabeça Fundão =

- Settlement
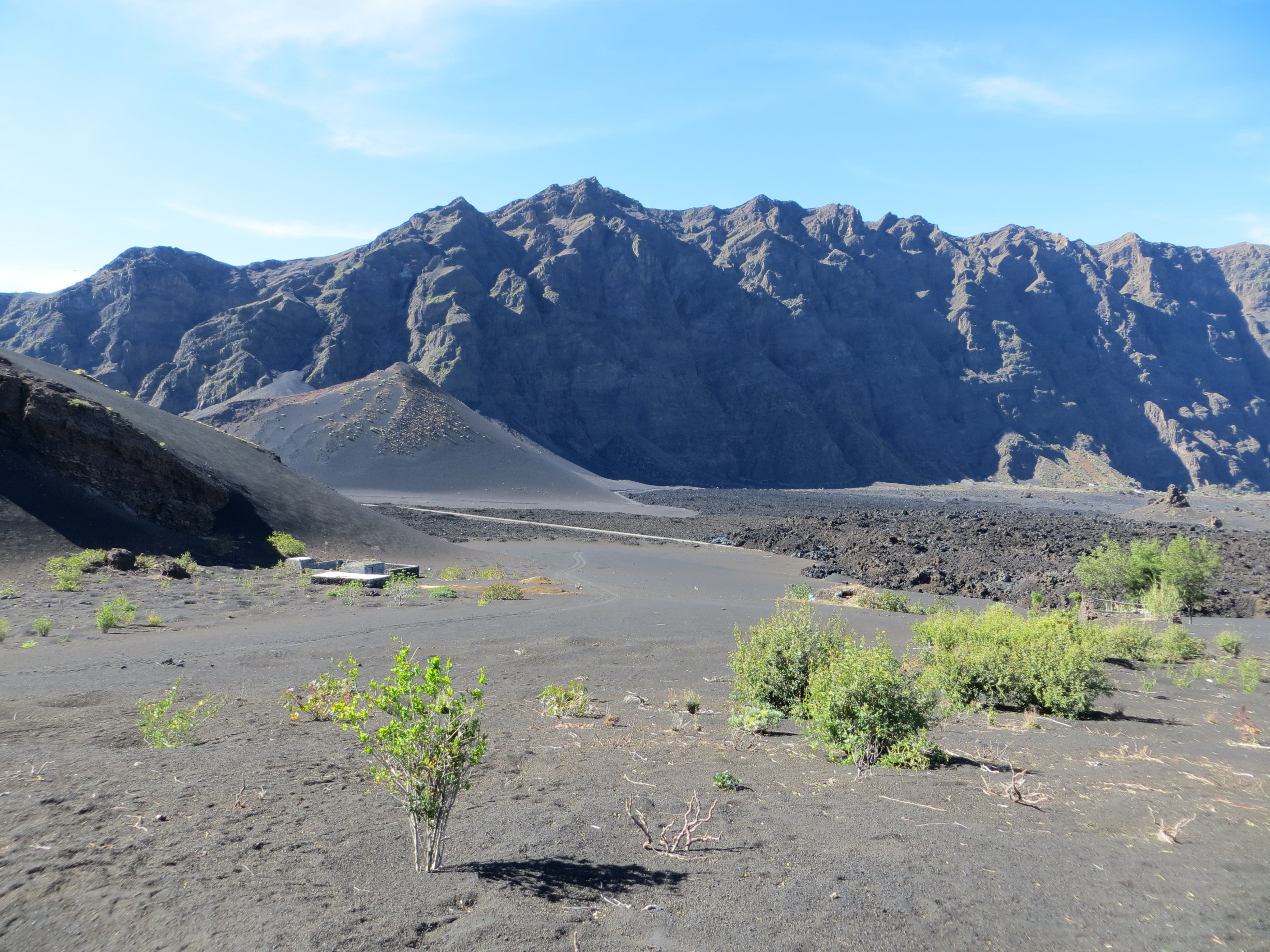
- The area to the north of Cabeça Fundão along with the south of Bordeira

- Location within Cape Verde
- Coordinates: 14.899°N 24.349°W
- Country: Cape Verde
- Island: Fogo
- Municipality: Santa Catarina do Fogo
- Civil parish: Santa Catarina do Fogo

Population (2010)
  - Total: 177
- ID: 83197

Cabeça Fundão is a settlement in the southern part of the island of Fogo, Cape Verde and sits on the foot of the mountain rim of Bordeira. It is situated 16 km east of the island capital São Filipe. In 2010 its population was 177. The village is located on the road from Achada Furna to Chã das Caldeiras (EN3-FG05). Its elevation is about 1,570 meters. Cabeça Fundão lies directly south of the Fogo Natural Park.

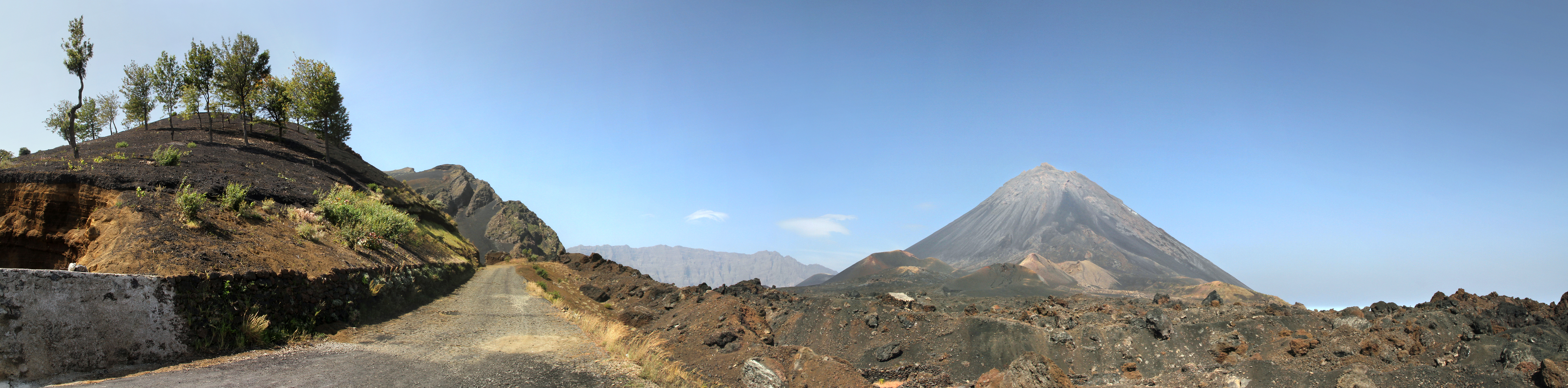
Panoramic view of Pico do Fogo and the upper northern part of Chã das Caldeiras from the Achada Furna-Pico do Fogo road in Cabeça Fundão

== See also ==
- List of villages and settlements in Cape Verde
