= Figueira Pavão =

- Settlement
- Coordinates: 14.871°N 24.311°W
- Country: Cape Verde
- Island: Fogo
- Municipality: Santa Catarina do Fogo
- Civil parish: Santa Catarina do Fogo

Population (2010)
  - Total: 320
- ID: 83105

Figueira Pavão is a settlement in the southeastern part of the island of Fogo, Cape Verde. In 2010 its population was 320. It is situated 3 km southwest of Cova Figueira and 20 km east of the island capital São Filipe. Nearby settlements are Achada Furna to the west and Estância Roque to the north.

== See also ==
- List of villages and settlements in Cape Verde
