= Fonte Aleixo =

- Settlement
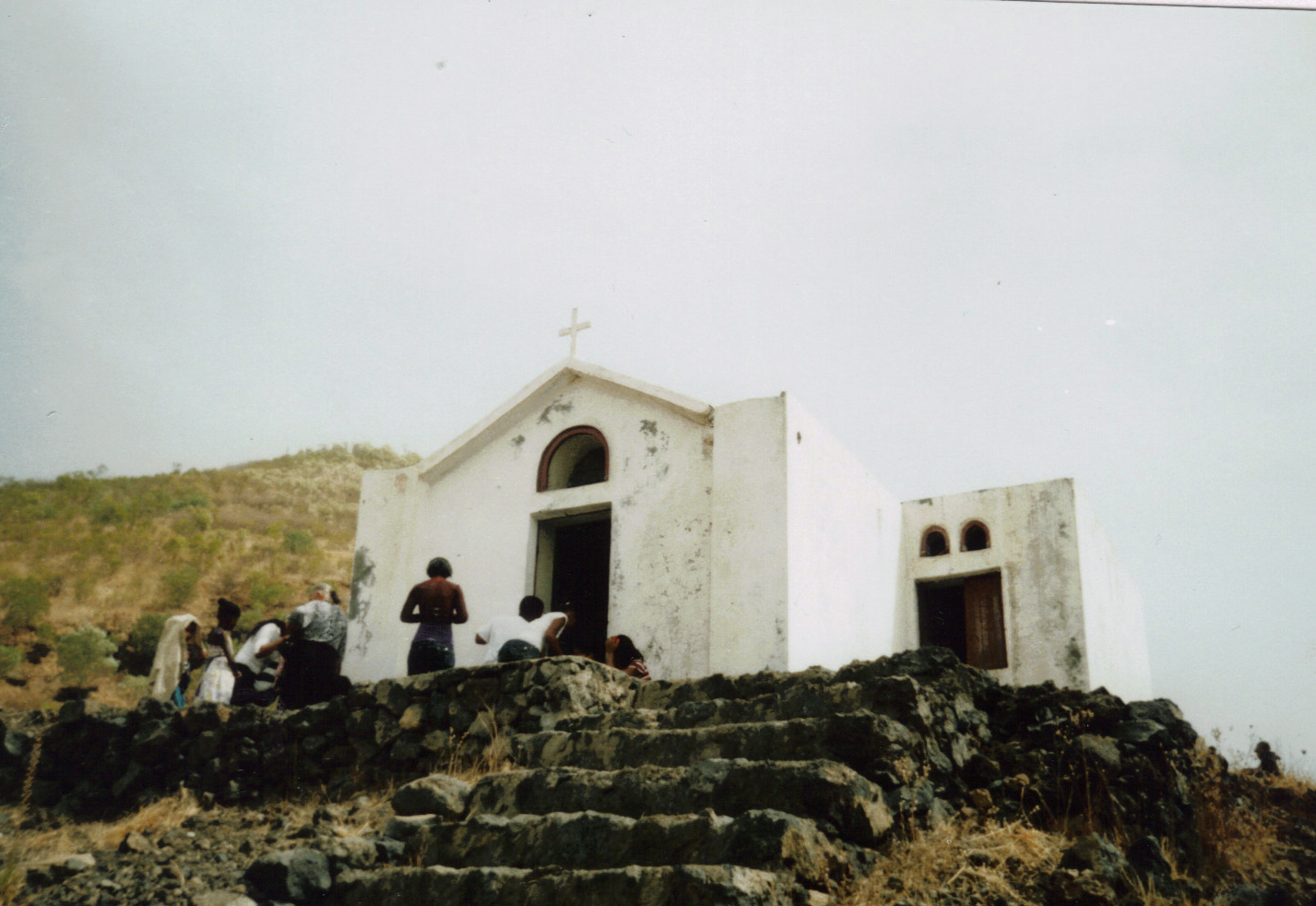
- Church of Fonte Aleixo

- Location within Cape Verde
- Coordinates: 14.848°N 24.356°W
- Country: Cape Verde
- Island: Fogo
- Municipality: Santa Catarina do Fogo
- Civil parish: Santa Catarina do Fogo

Population (2010)
  - Total: 401
- ID: 83106

Fonte Aleixo is a settlement in the southern part of the island of Fogo, Cape Verde. It is situated 3 km south of Achada Furna and 16 km southeast of the island capital São Filipe. In 2010 its population was 401.

== See also ==
- List of villages and settlements in Cape Verde
