= List of cities and towns in Cape Verde =

This is a list of cities and towns in Cape Verde. In Cape Verde, there are two types of urban settlements: cities (Portuguese: cidades) and towns (Portuguese: vilas). Since 2015, there are 24 cities and 19 towns. Every seat of a municipality has been designated a city.

== Cities ==
The following table shows the cities (cidades) of Cape Verde, with population data from 1990, 2000 and 2010.

City	Pop. 1990	Pop. 2000	Pop. 2010	Municipality
Praia	61,644		130,271	Praia
Mindelo	47,109	62,497	69,904	São Vicente
Espargos	5,578		17,081	Sal
Assomada	3,414	7,067	12,332	Santa Catarina
Pedra Badejo	5,302	8,519	9,859	Santa Cruz
Porto Novo	4,867	7,685	9,310	Porto Novo
São Filipe	5,616		8,122	São Filipe
Tarrafal	3,626	5,772	6,656	Tarrafal
Santa Maria	1,343		6,258	Sal
Sal Rei	1,522	2,024	5,778	Boa Vista
Mosteiros (Igreja)		358	4,124	Mosteiros
Tarrafal de São Nicolau			3,733	Tarrafal de São Nicolau
Calheta de São Miguel		4,967	3,175	São Miguel
Porto Inglês (Cidade do Maio)	1,573	2,664	2,971	Maio
São Domingos (Várzea da Igreja)		1,600	2,818	São Domingos
Ribeira Grande (Povoação)	2,550		2,564	Ribeira Grande
Ponta do Sol	1,505		2,143	Ribeira Grande
Ribeira Brava	1,899		1,936	Ribeira Brava
Nova Sintra	1,890	1,852	1,536	Brava
Pombas	1,161	1,796	1,295	Paul
Cova Figueira			1,230	Santa Catarina do Fogo
Cidade Velha (Santiago de Cabo Verde)			1,214	Ribeira Grande de Santiago
Picos (Achada Igreja)			986	São Salvador do Mundo
João Teves			703	São Lourenço dos Órgãos

== Towns ==
The following table shows the towns (vilas) of Cape Verde, with population data from 2010.

Town	Pop. 2010	Municipality
Ribeira da Barca	2,317	Santa Catarina
Achada Falcão	2,088	Santa Catarina
Achada Monte	1,652	São Miguel
Palmeira	1,420	Sal
Rabil	1,248	Boa Vista
Achada Tenda	1,242	Tarrafal
Chã de Tanque	1,164	Santa Catarina
Calheta	1,156	Maio
Ponta Verde	1,072	São Filipe
Ribeira da Prata	1,009	Tarrafal
Coculi	901	Ribeira Grande
Patim	876	São Filipe
Chã de Igreja	672	Ribeira Grande
Fajã de Baixo	620	Ribeira Brava
Ribeira das Patas	558	Porto Novo
Barreiro	535	Maio
Praia Branca	521	Tarrafal de São Nicolau
Juncalinho	433	Ribeira Brava
Nossa Senhora do Monte	271	Brava

== See also ==
- List of villages and settlements in Cape Verde
