= Palha Carga =

- Settlement
- Coordinates: 15.073°N 23.699°W
- Country: Cape Verde
- Island: Santiago
- Municipality: Santa Catarina
- Civil parish: Santa Catarina

Population (2010)
  - Total: 978
- ID: 72136

Palha Carga is a settlement in the western part of the island of Santiago, Cape Verde. It is situated 2 km south of Chã de Tanque and 4 km southwest of Assomada.
