= Charco =

Ribeira da Charco
- Settlement
- Coordinates: 15.122°N 23.7425°W
- Country: Cape Verde
- Island: Santiago
- Municipality: Santa Catarina
- Civil parish: Santa Catarina

Population (2010)
  - Total: 266
- ID: 72116

Charco is a settlement in the west of the island of Santiago, Cape Verde. It is part of the municipality of Santa Catarina. It lies 2.5 km southeast of Ribeira da Barca and 9 km west of the municipal seat Assomada. In 2010 its population was 266.
