= Achada Leite =

- Settlement
- Coordinates: 15.1166°N 23.7669°W
- Country: Cape Verde
- Island: Santiago
- Municipality: Santa Catarina
- Civil parish: Santa Catarina

Population (2010)
  - Total: 142
- ID: 72104

Achada Leite is a settlement on the west coast of the island of Santiago, Cape Verde. It is part of the municipality of Santa Catarina. It lies 2.5 km south of Ribeira da Barca and 11 km west of the municipal seat Assomada. In 2010 its population was 142.
