= Ribeirão Manuel =

- Settlement
- Coordinates: 15.110°N 23.702°W
- Country: Cape Verde
- Island: Santiago
- Municipality: Santa Catarina
- Civil parish: Santa Catarina

Population (2010)
  - Total: 1,086
- ID: 72146

Ribeirão Manuel is a village in the western part of the island of Santiago, Cape Verde. In 2010 its population was 1,086. It is situated 2 km north of Chã de Tanque and 4 km west of Assomada. The elevation is about 415 meters above sea level.
