= Figueira das Naus =

- Settlement
- Coordinates: 15.182°N 23.731°W
- Country: Cape Verde
- Island: Santiago
- Municipality: Santa Catarina
- Civil parish: Santa Catarina

Population (2010)
  - Total: 1,157
- ID: 72120

Figueira das Naus is a settlement in the western part of the island of Santiago, Cape Verde. It is part of the municipality of Santa Catarina. In 2010 its population was 1,157. It is situated 11 km south of Tarrafal and 12 km northwest of Assomada. It is situated on the secondary road connecting Fundura and Ribeira da Prata.

== Notable person ==
- Arlindo Gomes Furtado, current bishop of Santiago de Cabo Verde
