= Boa Entrada =

- Settlement
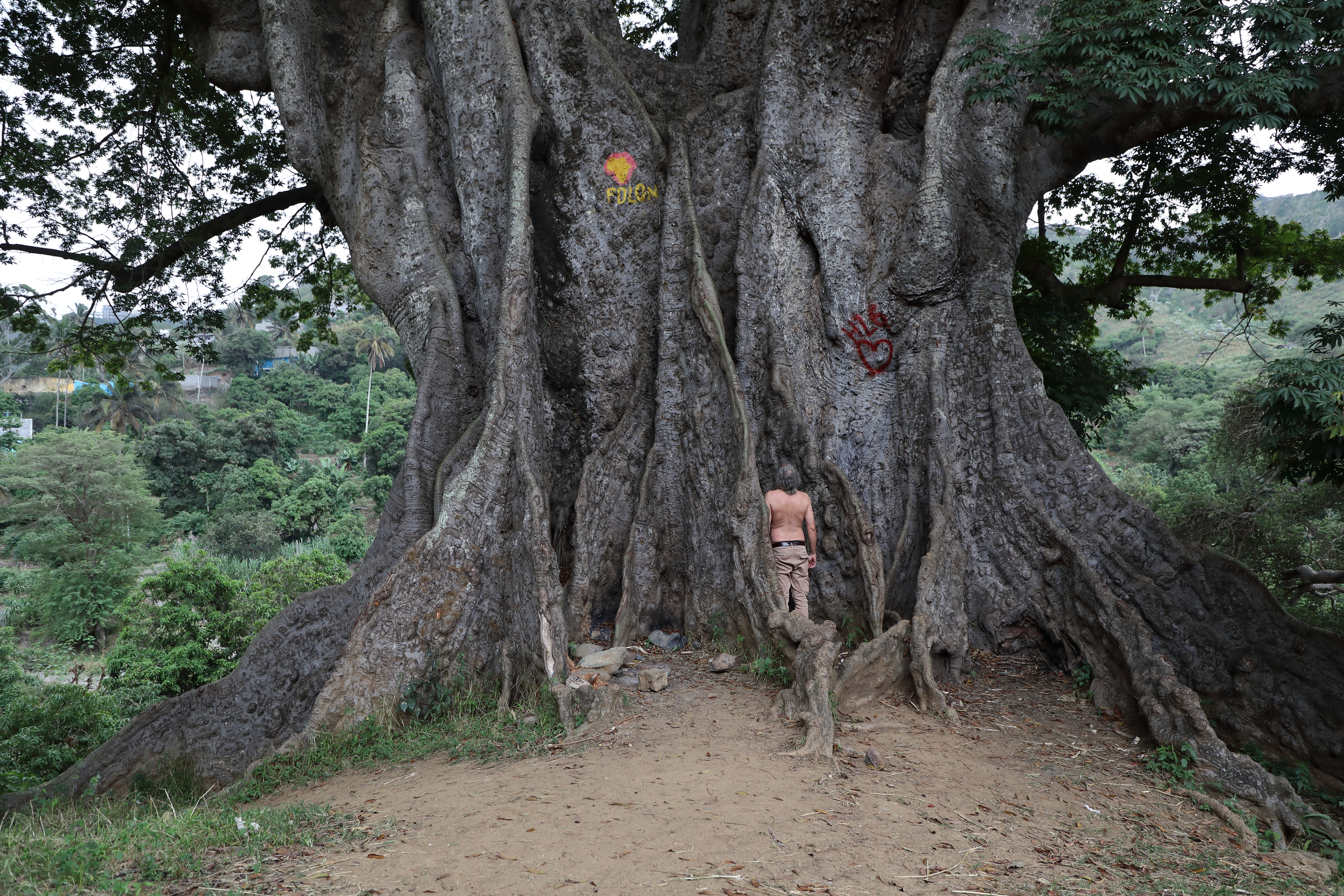

- Location within Cape Verde
- Coordinates: 15.115°N 23.670°W
- Country: Cape Verde
- Island: Santiago
- Municipality: Santa Catarina
- Civil parish: Santa Catarina

Population (2010)
  - Total: 1,119
- ID: 72111

Boa Entrada is a settlement in the central part of the island of Santiago, Cape Verde. In 2010 its population was 1,119. It is situated 2 km north of Assomada city centre. The area is intensively cultivated, especially with sugarcane and mango trees.

== Kapok tree ==
There is a very large kapok tree near the village of Boa Entrada, standing at the bottom of a valley, 400 m above sea level. It is the largest tree on Santiago and, probably, in the whole of the Republic of Cape Verde. The kapok tree is about 25 m high and was identified as an Important Bird Area (IBA) by BirdLife International because it supports a colony of purple herons.
