= Gil Bispo =

- Settlement
- Coordinates: 15.1021°N 23.6566°W
- Country: Cape Verde
- Island: Santiago
- Municipality: Santa Catarina
- Civil parish: Santa Catarina

Population (2010)
  - Total: 998
- ID: 72125

Gil Bispo is a settlement in the middle of the island of Santiago, Cape Verde. It is part of the municipality of Santa Catarina. It lies 1 km northeast of Assomada city centre. In 2010 its population was 998.
