= Mancholy =

- Settlement
- Coordinates: 15.1326°N 23.6774°W
- Country: Cape Verde
- Island: Santiago
- Municipality: Santa Catarina
- Civil parish: Santa Catarina

Population (2010)
  - Total: 903
- ID: 72132

Mancholy is a settlement in the northwestern part of the island of Santiago, Cape Verde. It is part of the municipality of Santa Catarina. In 2010 its population was 903. It is situated 4 km northwest of Assomada, on the road to Tarrafal (EN1-ST01).
