= Saltos Acima =

- Settlement
- Coordinates: 15.140°N 23.642°W
- Country: Cape Verde
- Island: Santiago
- Municipality: Santa Catarina
- Civil parish: Santa Catarina

Population (2010)
  - Total: 657
- ID: 72148

Saltos Acima is a village in the northcentral part of the island of Santiago, Cape Verde. It is part of the municipality of Santa Catarina. In 2010 its population was 657. It is situated 5 km northeast of Assomada. To the north it borders on the settlement Pedra Serrado, which is in the municipality of São Miguel.
