= Serra Malagueta (village) =

- Settlement
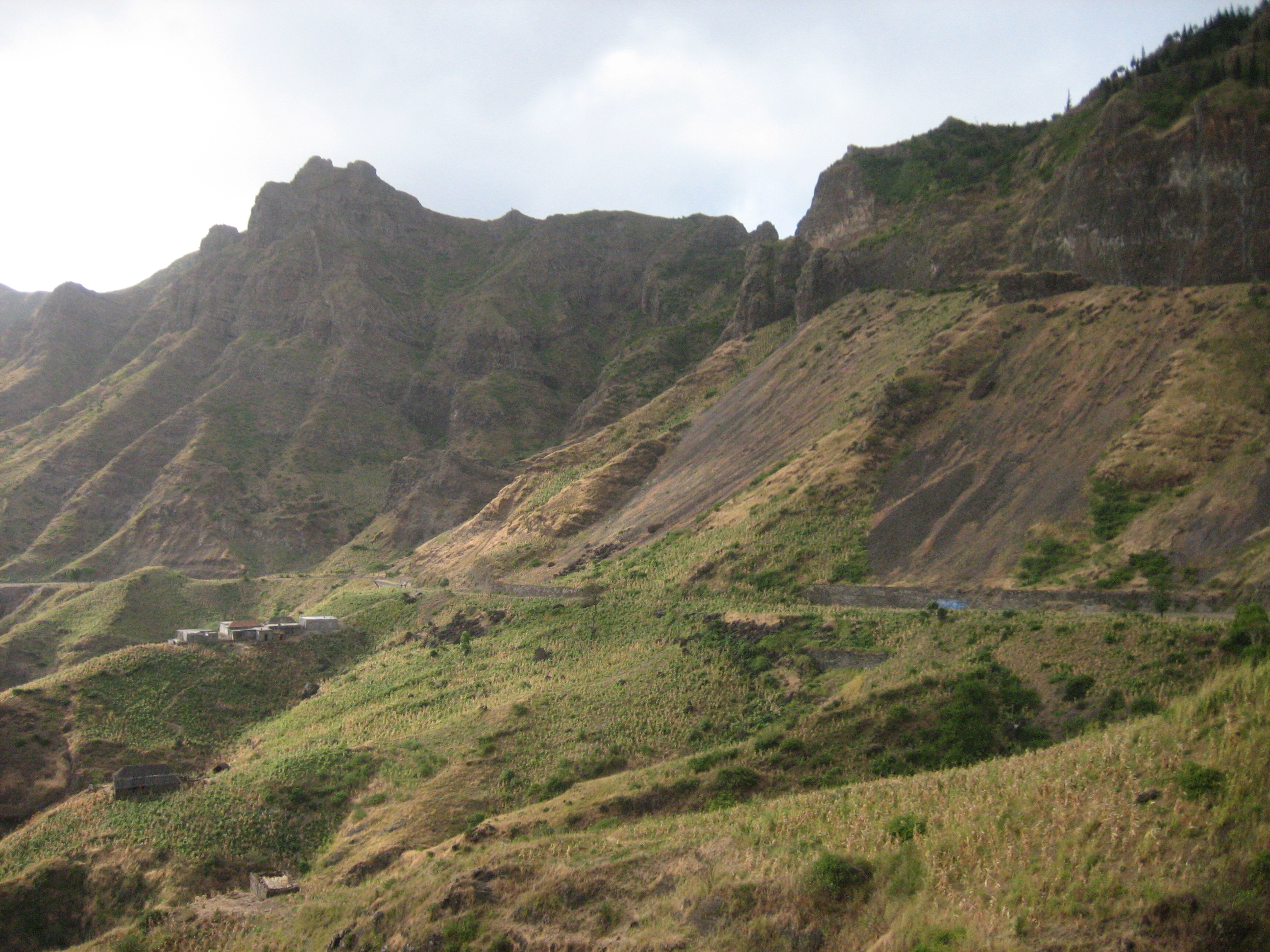
- Landscape around the village which is Serra da Malagueta

- Location within Cape Verde
- Coordinates: 15.1842°N 23.6899°W
- Country: Cape Verde
- Island: Santiago
- Municipality: Santa Catarina
- Civil parish: Santa Catarina

Population (2010)
  - Total: 572
- ID: 72150

Serra Malagueta is a settlement in the northwestcentral part of the island of Santiago, Cape Verde. It is part of the municipality of Santa Catarina. It is situated on the main road between Assomada and Tarrafal (EN1-ST01), 1 km south of Curral Velho (municipality of Tarrafal), 3 km (1.9 mi) north of Fundura and 11 km (6.8 mi) north of Assomada. In 2010 its population was 572. The main village, Locotano, sits at about 800 m elevation, northwest of the summit of Serra Malagueta, and lies partly in the Serra Malagueta Natural Park.
