= ISO 3166-2:CV =

Entry for Cabo Verde in ISO 3166-2

ISO 3166-2:CV is the entry for Cabo Verde in ISO 3166-2, part of the ISO 3166 standard published by the International Organization for Standardization (ISO), which defines codes for the names of the principal subdivisions (e.g., provinces or states) of all countries coded in ISO 3166-1.

Currently for Cabo Verde, ISO 3166-2 codes are defined for two levels of subdivisions:

- two geographical regions (i.e., the Barlavento Islands and the Sotavento Islands)
- 22 municipalities

Each code consists of two parts, separated by a hyphen. The first part is CV, the ISO 3166-1 alpha-2 code of Cabo Verde. The second part is either of the following:

- one letter: geographical regions
- two letters: municipalities

== Current codes ==
Subdivision names are listed as in the ISO 3166-2 standard published by the ISO 3166 Maintenance Agency (ISO 3166/MA).

Click on the button in the header to sort each column.

=== Geographical regions ===
Code	Subdivision name (pt)
CV-B	Ilhas de Barlavento
CV-S	Ilhas de Sotavento

=== Municipalities ===
Code	Subdivision name (pt)	In geographical region
CV-BV	Boa Vista	B
CV-BR	Brava	S
CV-MA	Maio	S
CV-MO	Mosteiros	S
CV-PA	Paul	B
CV-PN	Porto Novo	B
CV-PR	Praia	S
CV-RB	Ribeira Brava	B
CV-RG	Ribeira Grande	B
CV-RS	Ribeira Grande de Santiago	S
CV-SL	Sal	B
CV-CA	Santa Catarina	S
CV-CF	Santa Catarina do Fogo	S
CV-CR	Santa Cruz	S
CV-SD	São Domingos	S
CV-SF	São Filipe	S
CV-SO	São Lourenço dos Órgãos	S
CV-SM	São Miguel	S
CV-SS	São Salvador do Mundo	S
CV-SV	São Vicente	B
CV-TA	Tarrafal	S
CV-TS	Tarrafal de São Nicolau	B

== Changes ==
The following changes to the entry have been announced in newsletters by the ISO 3166/MA since the first publication of ISO 3166-2 in 1998:

Newsletter	Date issued	Description of change in newsletter	Code/Subdivision change
Newsletter I-2	2002-05-21	Subdivision layout partially revised: Three new municipalities. New reference for list source	Subdivisions added: CV-CS Calheta de São Miguel; CV-MO Mosteiros; CV-SF São Filipe
Newsletter II-2	2010-06-30	Addition of the country code prefix as the first code element, update of the administrative structure and of the list source	Subdivisions added: CV-RB Ribeira Brava; CV-RS Ribeira Grande de Santiago; CV-CF Santa Catarina do Fogo; CV-SL São Lourenço dos Órgãos; CV-SS São Salvador do Mundo; CV-TS Tarrafal de São Nicolau; Subdivisions deleted: CV-SN São Nicolau; Codes: CV-CS Calheta de São Miguel → CV-SM São Miguel
Newsletter II-3	2011-12-13 (corrected 2011-12-15)	Correction of NL II-2 for toponyms and typographical errors and source list update.	Codes: São Lourenço dos Órgãos CV-SL → CV-SO

== See also ==
- Subdivisions of Cape Verde
  - pt:Código Geográfico Nacional de Cabo Verde
- FIPS region codes of Cape Verde (formerly used by the U.S. Government; deprecated in 2002)
