= Fundura =

- Settlement
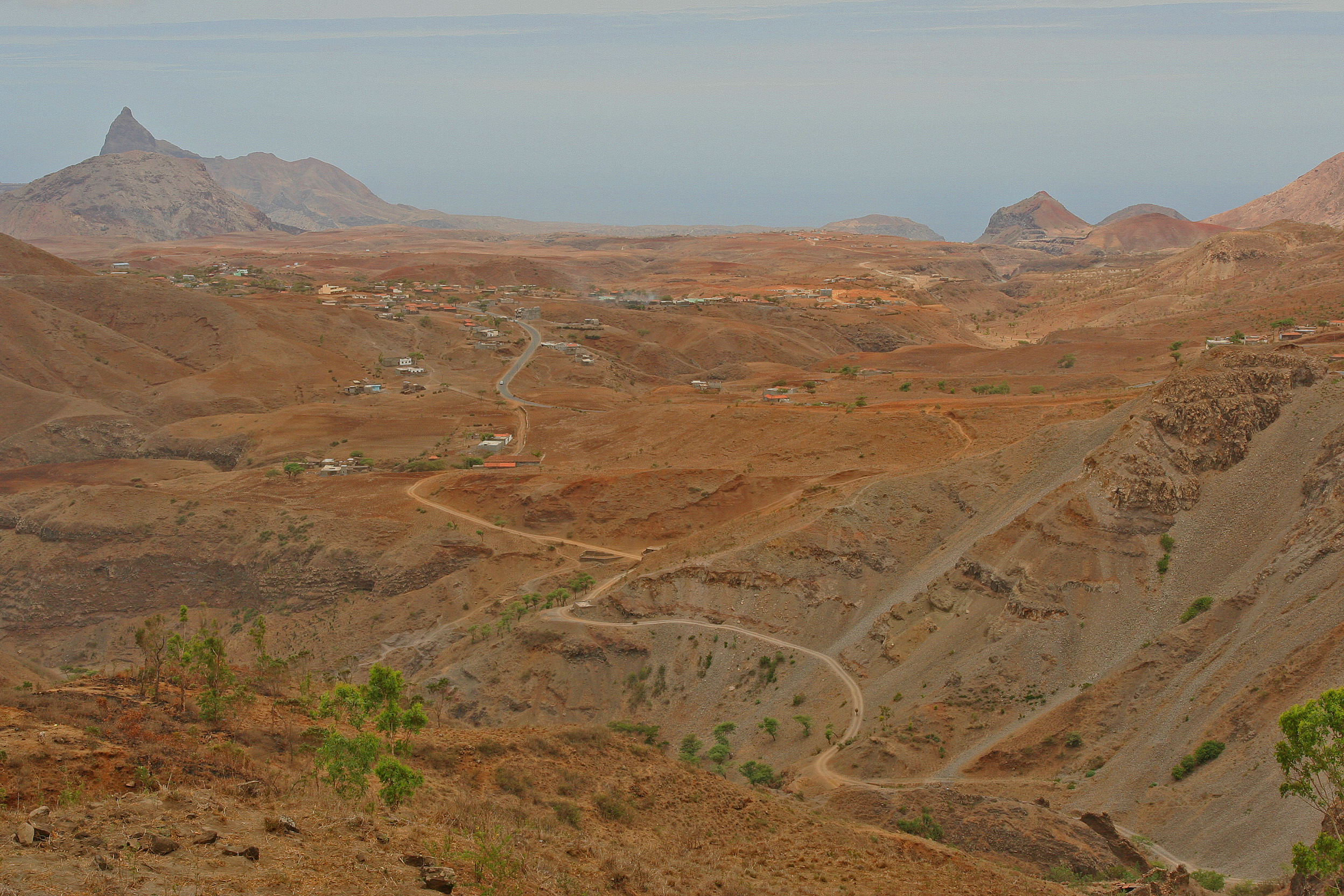
- View of Fundura and its surrounding area

- Location within Cape Verde
- Coordinates: 15.1648°N 23.6992°W
- Country: Cape Verde
- Island: Santiago
- Municipality: Santa Catarina
- Civil parish: Santa Catarina

Population (2010)
  - Total: 1,070
- ID: 72153

Fundura is a village in the northwestern part of the island of Santiago, Cape Verde. It is part of the municipality of Santa Catarina. In 2010 its population was 1,070. It is located about 8 km north of Assomada, on the road to Tarrafal (EN1-ST01).
