= Rincão, Cape Verde =

Rincão
- Settlement
- Coordinates: 15.061°N 23.764°W
- Country: Cape Verde
- Island: Santiago
- Municipality: Santa Catarina
- Civil parish: Santa Catarina

Population (2010)
  - Total: 1,048
- ID: 72147

Rincão (also: Porto Rincão) is a settlement in the western part of the island of Santiago, Cape Verde. In 2010, its population was 1,048 and it is situated on the west coast, 6 km southwest of Assomada. The westernmost point of the island, Ponta da Janela, lies 2 km to the northwest.
