= Achada Lem =

- Settlement
- Coordinates: 15.150°N 23.685°W
- Country: Cape Verde
- Island: Santiago
- Municipality: Santa Catarina
- Civil parish: Santa Catarina

Population (2010)
  - Total: 2,088
- ID: 72105

Achada Lem is a settlement in the northcentral part of the island of Santiago, Cape Verde. In 2010 its population was 2,088. It is situated 6 km north of Assomada, on the road to Tarrafal (EN1-ST01). Its elevation is about 490 meters above sea level. Arlindo Gomes Furtado, now bishop and cardinal studied at the village's primary school.
