= Curral Velho (Santiago) =

- Settlement
- Coordinates: 15.199°N 23.694°W
- Country: Cape Verde
- Island: Santiago
- Municipality: Tarrafal
- Civil parish: Santo Amaro Abade

Population (2010)
  - Total: 358
- ID: 71109

Curral Velho is a settlement in the northern part of the island of Santiago, Cape Verde. It is part of the municipality of Tarrafal. In 2010 its population was 358. It is located 1 km north of Locotano and 11 km southeast of Tarrafal, on the Praia-Assomada-Tarrafal Road (EN1-ST01).
