= Chã de Tanque =

- Settlement
- Coordinates: 15.0922°N 23.7024°W
- Country: Cape Verde
- Island: Santiago
- Municipality: Santa Catarina
- Civil parish: Santa Catarina

Population (2010)
  - Total: 1,164
- ID: 72115

Chã de Tanque is a town in the west-central part of the island of Santiago, Cape Verde. It is part of the municipality of Santa Catarina. In 2010 its population was 1,164. It is situated 4 km west of Assomada, on the road to Rincão. The elevation is about 260 meters above sea level. Since 2008, it is home to the Museu da Tabanca.

== Notable person ==
- Gil Semedo, singer
