= Museu da Tabanca =

- Location within Cape Verde
- Established: February 2000
- Location: Chã de Tanque, Santiago, Cape Verde
- Coordinates: 15.0921°N 23.7011°W
- Type: Music-related Museum
- Collections: music, tabanka-related

The Museu da Tabanca is a museum in the town Chã de Tanque in the western part of the island of Santiago in Cape Verde. It is dedicated to local culture, including tabanka music. The museum was first opened in 2000 in Assomada, the seat of the municipality of Santa Catarina, but in December 2008 it was moved to its current location in Chã de Tanque, also part of Santa Catarina. After two years of renovation, it was reopened in November 2017.

== See also ==
- List of museums in Cape Verde
- List of buildings and structures in Santiago, Cape Verde
