= Santa Catarina, Cape Verde =

Municipality of Cape Verde

Santa Catarina
- Municipality
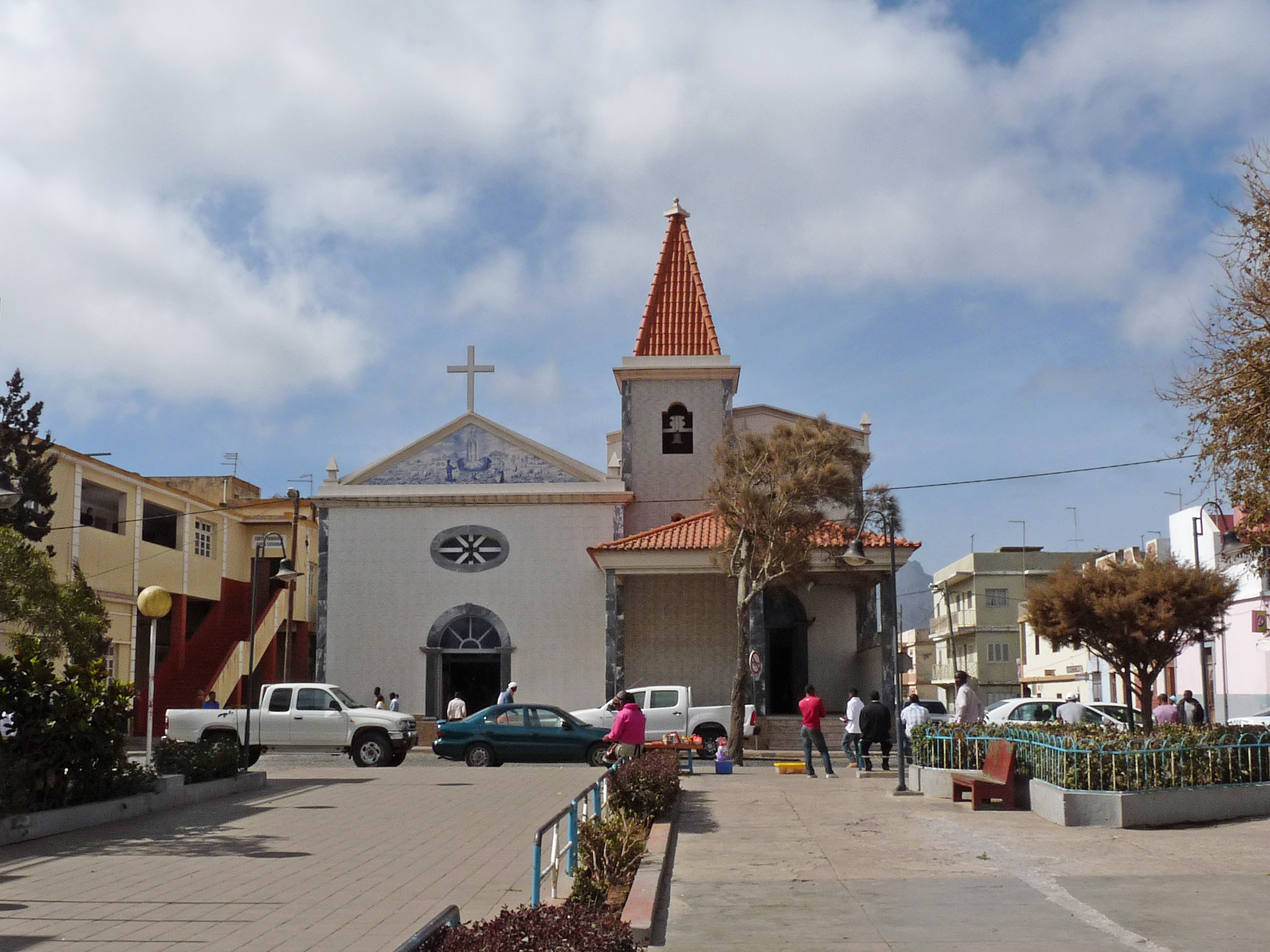
- Igreja de Nossa Senhora de Fátima, Assomada, Cabo Verde

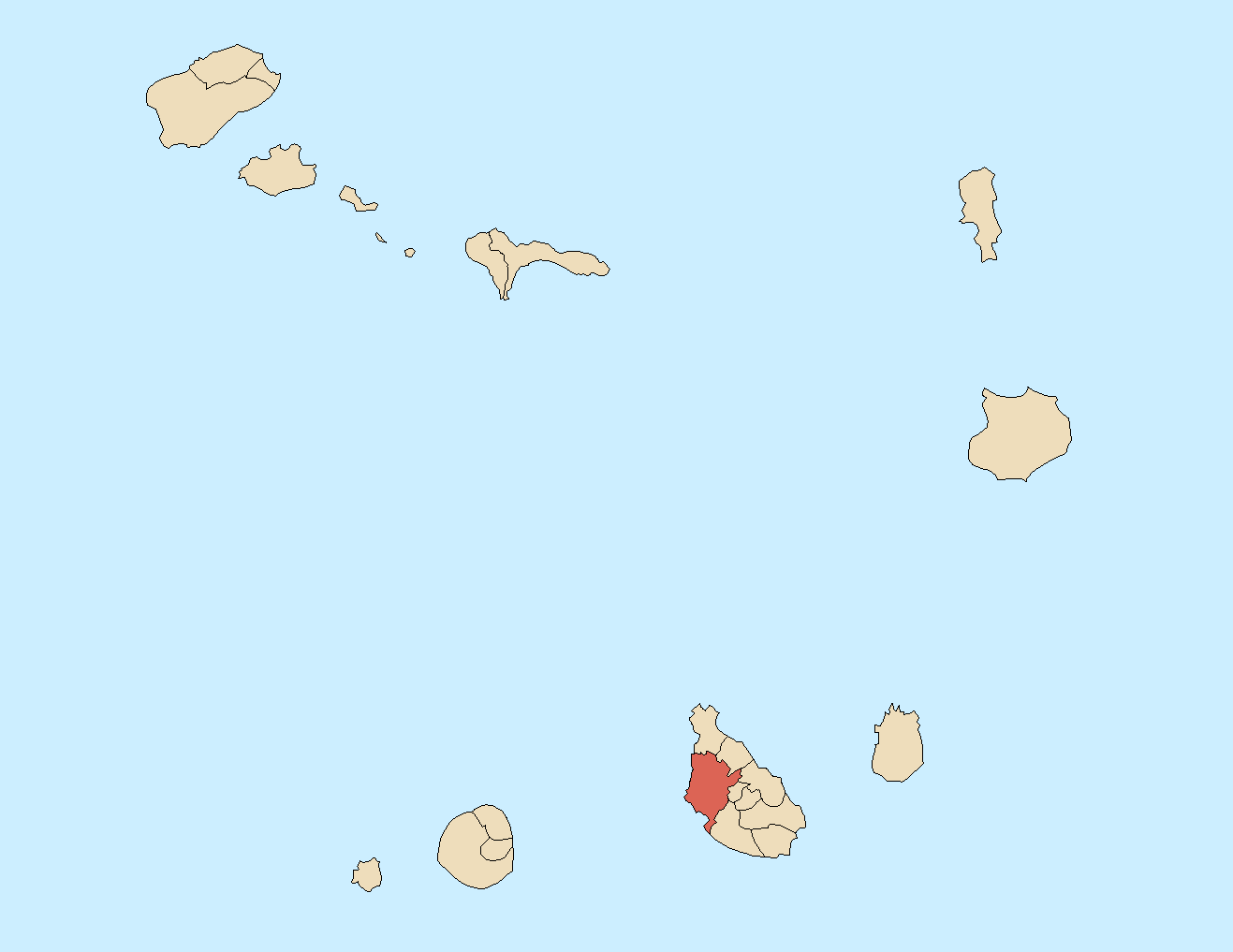
- Coordinates: 15.10°N 23.71°W
- Country: Cape Verde
- Island: Santiago

Area
  - Total: 242.6 km^{2} (93.7 sq mi)

Population (2010)
  - Total: 43,297
  - Density: 178.5/km^{2} (462.2/sq mi)
- ID: 72
- Website: cmscst.cv

Santa Catarina is a concelho (municipality) of Cape Verde. It is situated in the western part of the island of Santiago. Its seat is the city of Assomada. Its population was 45,920 in 2017 (estimate). Its area is 242.6 km^{2} (93.7 sq mi).

== Subdivisions ==
The municipality consists of one freguesia (civil parish), Santa Catarina. The freguesia is subdivided into the following settlements (population data as of 2010):

- Achada Galego (pop: 865)
- Achada Gomes (pop: 743)
- Achada Lazão (pop: 2)
- Achada Leite (pop: 142)
- Achada Lem (pop: 2,088)
- Achada Ponta (pop: 195)
- Achada Tossa (pop: 742)
- Aguas Podres (pop: 205)
- Arribada (pop: 286)
- Assomada (pop: 23,334, city)
- Banana Semedo (pop: 428)
- Boa Entrada (pop: 1,119)
- Boa Entradinha (pop: 637)
- Bombardeiro (pop: 914)
- Chã de Lagoa (pop: 381)
- Chã de Tanque (pop: 1,164, town)
- Charco (pop: 266)
- Cruz Grande (pop: 798)
- Entre Picos (pop: 411)
- Entre Picos de Reda (pop: 412)
- Figueira das Naus (pop: 1,157)
- Fonte Lima (pop: 894)
- Fonteana (pop: 747)
- Fundura (pop: 1,070)
- Furna (pop: 433)
- Gamchemba (pop: 107)
- Gil Bispo (pop: 998)
- Japluma (pop: 156)
- João Bernardo (pop: 317)
- João Dias (pop: 546)
- Junco (pop: 336)
- Librão (pop: 391)
- Lugar Velho (pop: 10)
- Mancholy (pop: 903)
- Mato Baixo (pop: 488)
- Mato Gege (pop: 704)
- Mato Sancho (pop: 414)
- Palha Carga (pop: 978)
- Pata Brava (pop: 197)
- Pau Verde (pop: 256)
- Pingo Chuva (pop: 505)
- Pinha dos Engenhos (pop: 650)
- Ribeira da Barca (pop: 2,317)
- Ribeira Riba (pop: 192)
- Ribeirão Isabel (pop: 409)
- Ribeirão Manuel (pop: 1,086)
- Rincão (pop: 1,048)
- Saltos Acima (pop: 105)
- Sedeguma (pop: 122)
- Serra Malagueta (pop: 572)
- Tomba Touro (pop: 82)

== Geography ==
The municipality of Santa Catarina has a rugged relief, characterised by steep slopes that border the river valleys, rocky peaks and volcanic cones. Its mountains, including Serra Malagueta and Pico da Antónia, are the highest of the island. Santa Catarina borders Tarrafal to the north, São Miguel to the northeast, Santa Cruz to the east, São Salvador do Mundo to the southeast and Ribeira Grande de Santiago to the south.

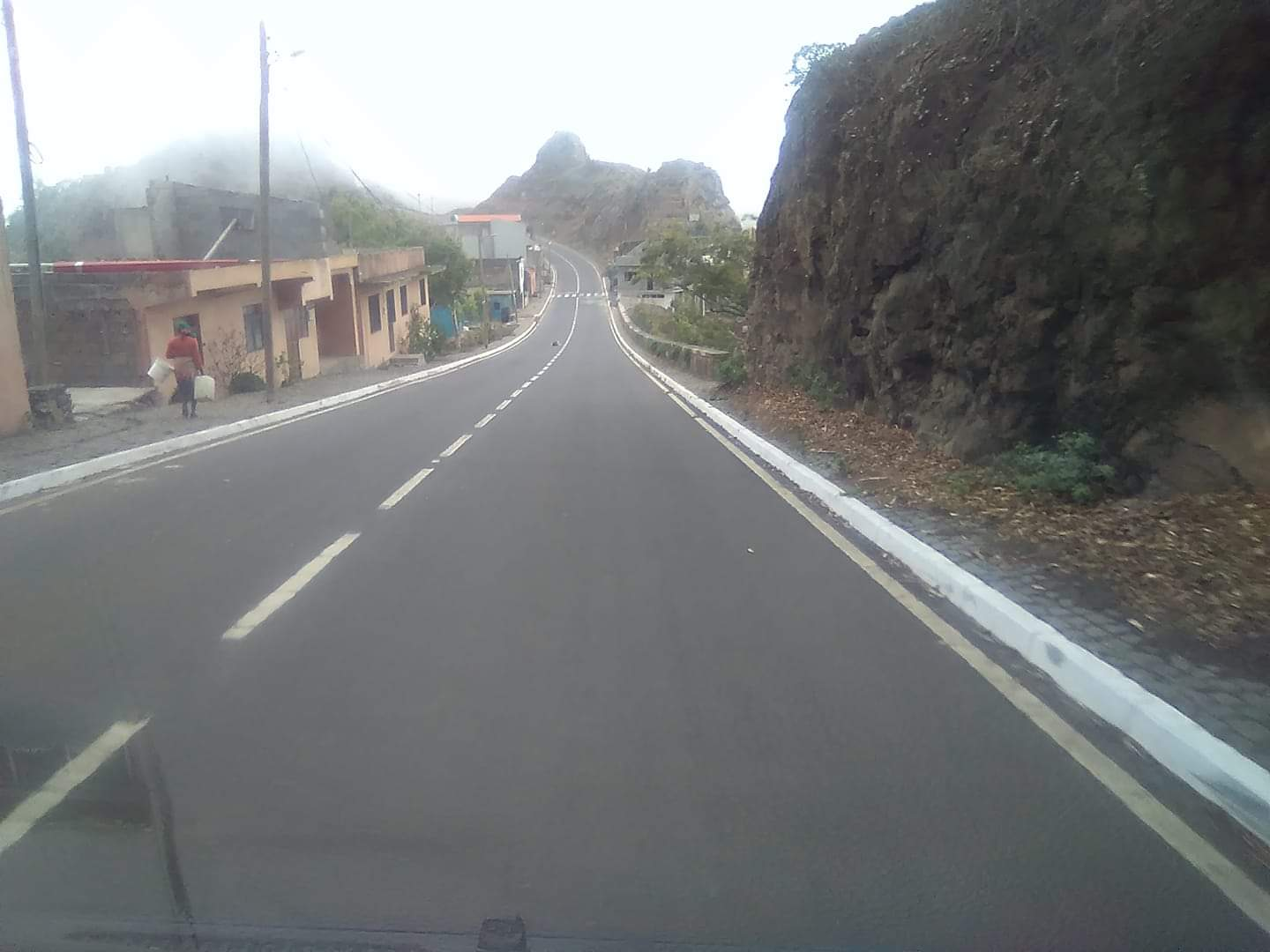
Serra Malagueta

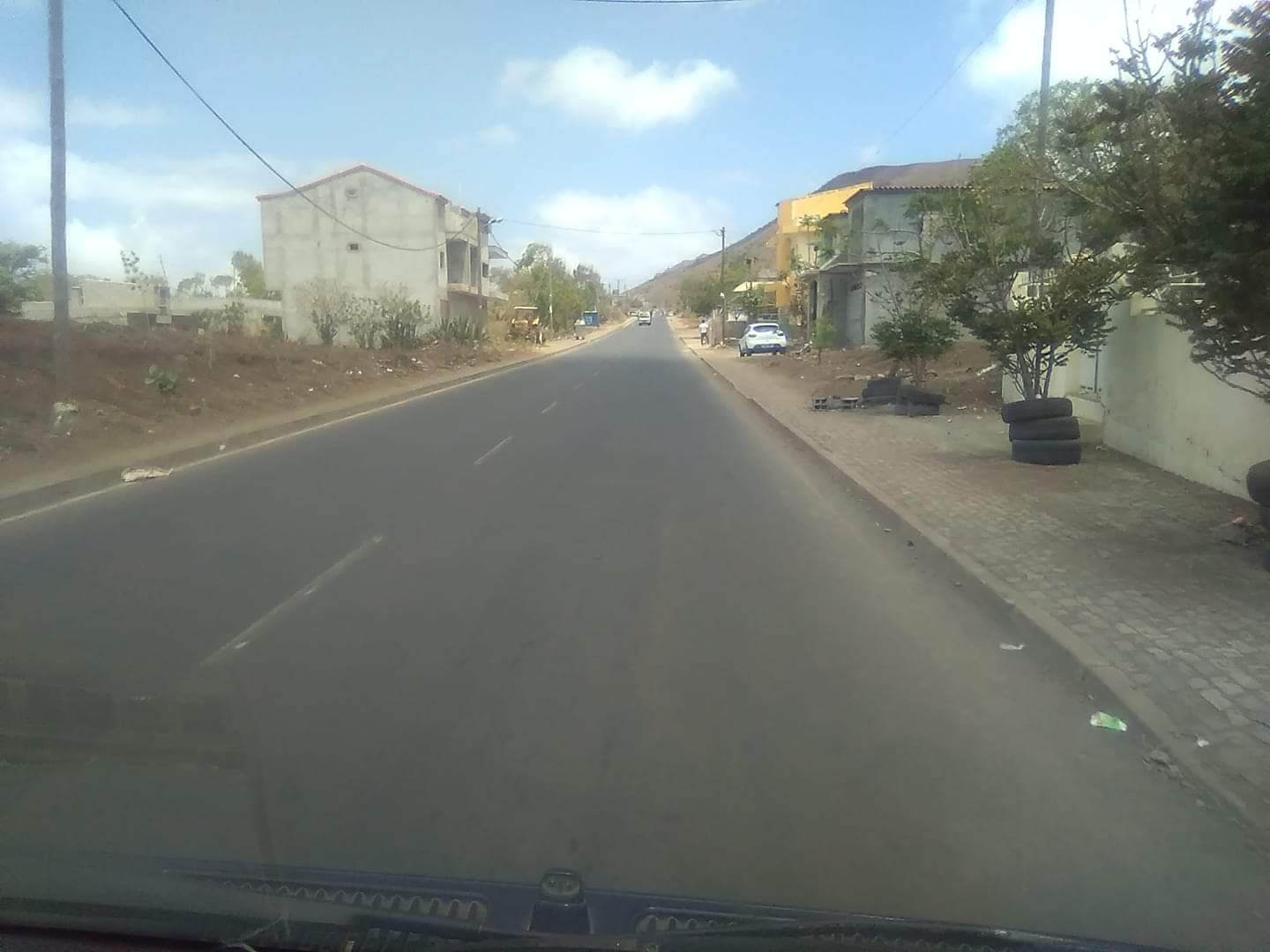
Achada Lém, Santa Catarina

== History ==
The municipality of Santa Catarina was created in 1834. At this time, it consisted of the parishes Santa Catarina do Mato (the current municipality of Santa Catarina), São Salvador do Mundo, São Miguel, Santo Amaro Abade and São João Baptista. Initially, its seat was the new town of Picos, between 1859 and 1869 it was Achada Falcão (Cruz Grande), between 1869 and 1912 Tarrafal, and since 1912 Assomada.

The parishes São João Baptista and São Salvador do Mundo became part of the municipality of Praia in 1872. In 1917, the two northern parishes of the municipality Santo Amaro Abade and São Miguel were split off to become the Municipality of Tarrafal. The parish of São Salvador do Mundo became part of the municipality Santa Catarina again in 1971, and in May 2005 it was split off to become a separate municipality.

== Demography ==
Population of Santa Catarina (1940—2017)
Year	Population
1940	26,848
1950	19,428
1960	30,207
1970	41,462
1980	41,012
1990	41,584
2000	50,024
2010	43,297
2017	45,920

== Persons ==
- Víctor Borges, once the foreign minister of Cape Verde
- Arlindo Gomes Furtado, current bishop of Santiago de Cabo Verde which covers all of the Sotavento Islands
- Danielson Gomes Monteiro, footballer
- Gilyto, singer
- Suzanna Lubrano, singer
- António Mascarenhas Monteiro (February 16, 1944-September 2016), a former president of Cape Verde from March 22, 1991 to March 22, 2001.
- Wania Monteiro, athlete
- Ivone Ramos (b. July 9, 1926)
- José Maria Neves (b. March 28, 1960), Cape Verdean statesman
- Gil Semedo, singer
- Tcheka, singer
- Manuel Veiga (b. March 27, 1948), Cape Verdean writer
- Jovane Cabral, football player

== Politics ==
At the federal level, it belongs to the constituency of Santiago North. Since 2012, the Movement for Democracy (MpD) is the ruling party of the municipality. The results of the latest elections, in 2016:

Party	Municipal Council		Municipal Assembly	
Party	Votes%	Seats	Votes%	Seats
MpD	49.86	9	49.74	11
PAICV	47.17	0	47.17	10

=== Presidents ===
- José Maria Neves (2000-2001), later became Prime Minister and the country's President
- Francisco Tavares (2008-2016)
- José Alves Fernandes (2016-2020)

== Festivities ==
The municipality's main festivity is the festival of Saint Catherine which takes place on November 24.

== International relations ==
Santa Catarina is twinned with:

- Hattersheim am Main, Germany
- Trofa, Portugal
- Vila Franca de Xira, Portugal

Santa Catarina also cooperates with:

- Montijo, Portugal
