= Ribeira da Barca =

- Settlement
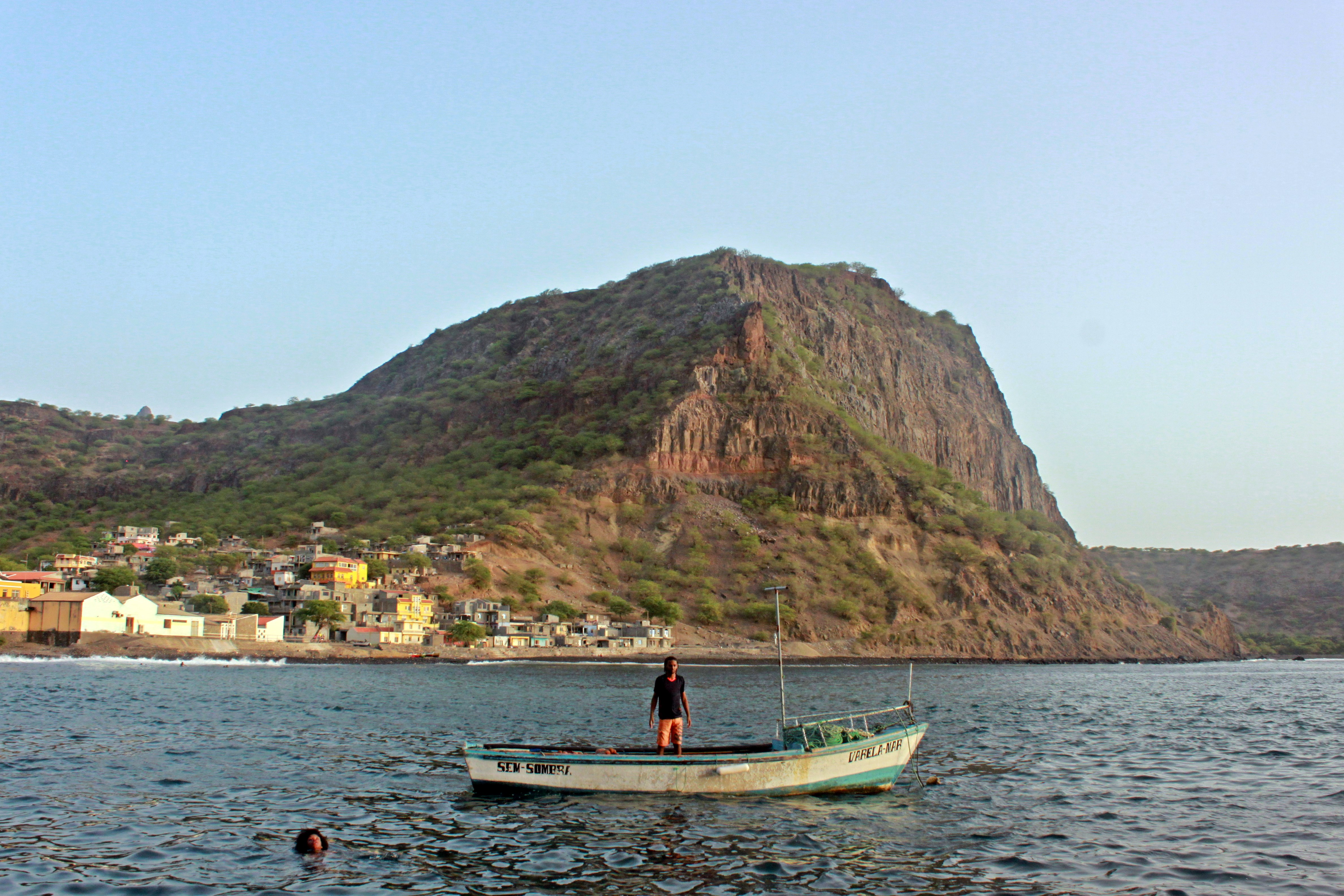
- The cliff south of Ribeira da Barca

- Location within Cape Verde
- Coordinates: 15.138°N 23.759°W
- Country: Cape Verde
- Island: Santiago
- Municipality: Santa Catarina
- Civil parish: Santa Catarina
- Elevation: 13 m (43 ft)

Population (2010)
  - Total: 2,317
- ID: 72144

Ribeira da Barca is a town in the municipality of Santa Catarina, on the island of Santiago, Cape Verde. In 2010 its population was 2,317. It is situated on the west coast, at the mouth of the stream Ribeira da Barca, 11 km northwest of Assomada. The settlement was mentioned as "Rivera das Baras" in the 1747 map by Jacques-Nicolas Bellin.

== Notable people ==
- António Mascarenhas Monteiro, former president of the Republic of Cabo Verde
- Suzanna Lubrano, singer currently residing in Rotterdam in the Netherlands
- Tcheka, musician
