= Tcheka =

Leonel Almeida
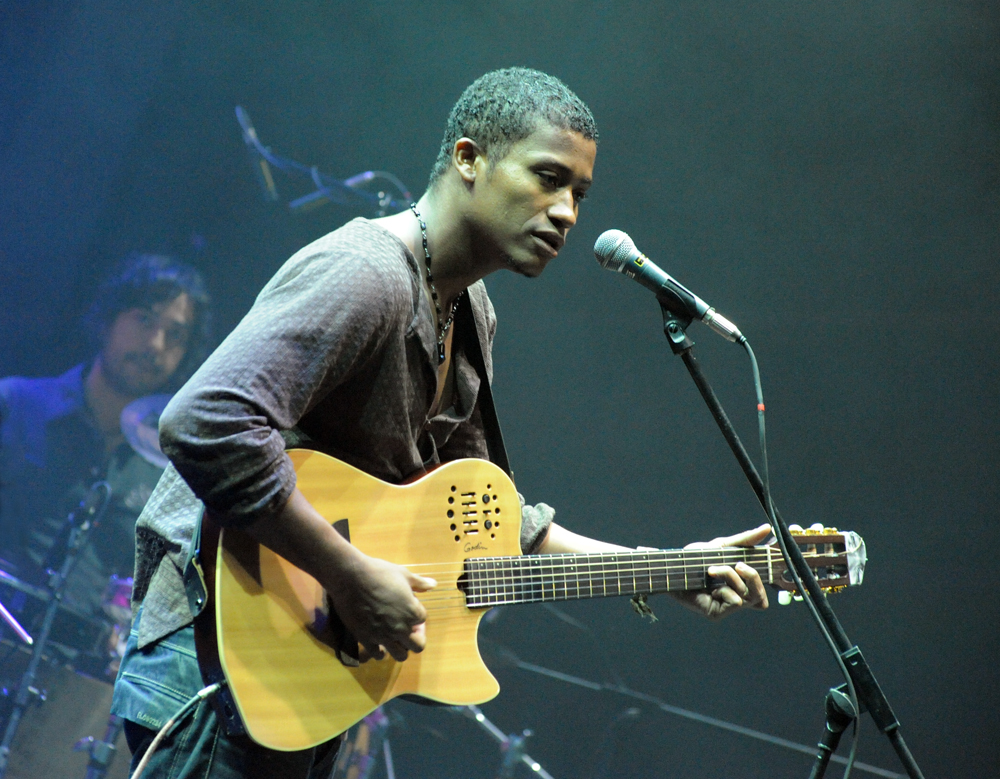
- Tcheka in Warsaw, Poland in September 2009

Background information
- Born: July 20, 1973 (age 51); Ribeira da Barca, Santiago, Cape Verde
- Occupation: singer
- Years active: 1987 or 1988

Tcheka (Manuel Lopes Andrade; born in Ribeira da Barca, Santiago, Cape Verde, on July 20, 1973) is a Cape Verdean singer, songwriter and guitarist, who is well known for his work in transposing the traditional genre batuque to the electro-acoustic guitar.

== Biography ==
Tcheka grew up in a musical family. By age 14, Tcheka began playing with his famous violinist father, Nho Raul Andrade, at local festivals, weddings and baptisms. By the time Tcheka reached 15, he began developing his own style, incorporating the genre batuque with his guitar. As a young man, Tcheka left his rural home and went to live in the capital, Praia. He later became a cameraman for the national television, where he met journalist Júlio Rodrigues, with whom he wrote a number of songs, and performed informally in the bars of the Capeverdean capital.

Tcheka expanded his musical horizons, which brought him to maturity as an artist and led to the release of his first CD in 2003 entitled Argui, by the record label Lusafrica. He performed in several European countries and he even recorded a live concert DVD in 2004. In 2005, Tcheka recorded his second album entitled Nu Monda, which was met with very good reviews and won him the Radio France International Music of the World Awards for Artist of the Year. Tcheka was a featured artist at the World Music Expo (WOMEX) in Seville, Spain. In 2015 he started a cooperation with South African guitarist Derek Gripper that they brought to Busara Festival (Zanzibar), HIFA (Zimbabwe) and Cape Town World Music Festival (South Africa).

A collaboration with portuguese star pianist Mario Langhina resulted in a series of concerts and a recording yet to be released.

He released his fifth album 'Boka Kafé' in 2017 and toured several countries (US, Spain, Germany, Serbia, Latvia, Estonia, Poland, Hungary, Portugal, France, Luxembourg) with concerts at important locations such as Jazz in Marciac, Lincoln Center NY, Chicago World Music Festival among others.

== Discography ==
=== Studio albums ===
- Argui (2003)
- Nu Monda (2005)
- Lonji (2007)
- Dor De Mar (2011)
- Boka Kafé (2017)
- Spera Mundo (2025)
