= Dani (footballer, born 1984) =

Cape Verdean footballer (born 1984)

Personal information
- Full name: Danielson Gomes Monteiro
- Date of birth: 6 February 1984 (age 42)
- Place of birth: Assomada, Cape Verde
- Height: 1.75 m (5 ft 9 in)
- Position: Midfielder

Youth career
- 1999–2001: Benfica
- 2001–2002: Atlético CP
- 2002–2003: Benfica

Senior career*
Years	Team	Apps	(Gls)
2003–2004	Amora	25	(1)
2004–2005	Beja		
2005–2006	Oriental	22	(1)
2006–2007	Odivelas	13	(0)
2007–2008	Leiria	1	(0)
2009	Olhanense	1	(0)
2009–2010	Oriental	10	(1)
2010–2011	Real Sport Clube	19	(1)
2011	Strømmen	6	(0)
2015–2016	Rælingen	10	(0)
2017–2018	RM Hamm Benfica	6	(0)
2018–2019	US Sandweiler	24	(2)
2019–2020	RM Hamm Benfica		
- * Club domestic league appearances and goals

Danielson Gomes Monteiro (born 6 February 1984), known as Dani, is Cape Verdean footballer who plays as a midfielder. He spent most of his career playing for clubs in the third highest level of Portuguese football. Dani played twice in the Liga de Honra, for Leiria and Olhanense.
