= Ilhéu de Baluarte =

Uninhabited islet of the Cape Verde archipelago

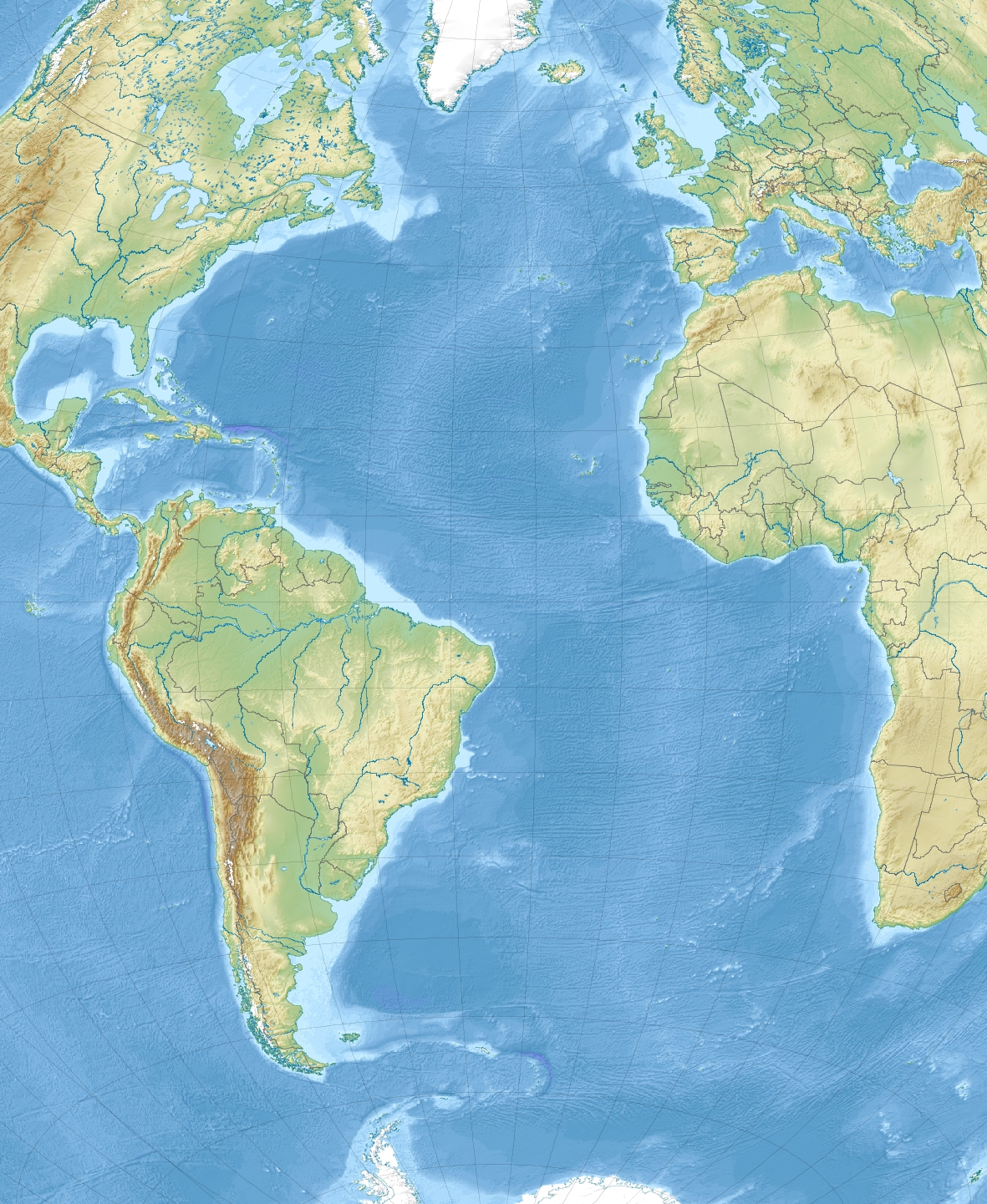
- Location within Cape Verde Location within Atlantic Ocean

Geography
- Location: Atlantic Ocean
- Coordinates: 16°9′12″N 22°39′34″W
- Archipelago: Cape Verde
- Area: 0.077 km^{2} (0.030 sq mi)
- Highest elevation: 5 m (16 ft)

Administration
- Cape Verde
- Concelhos (Municipalities): Boa Vista

Ilhéu de Baluarte is a small uninhabited islet of the Cape Verde archipelago located 2 km (1.2 mi) off the northeastern coast of the island of Boa Vista. It is the easternmost land mass of Cape Verde. Its distance to the African mainland is about 560 km (350 mi). The islet and its surrounding marine area forms the protected area Reserva Natural Integral Ilhéu de Baluarte. Its area is 7.65 ha (18.9 acres) and the protected marine area around it is 87 ha (210 acres). Its highest point is less than five meters; it is a flat and rocky isle made up of basaltic rocks. It became an integral protected natural area in 1990, visits can only be done by the permission of local authorities.
