= Gil Semedo =

Cape Verdean artist

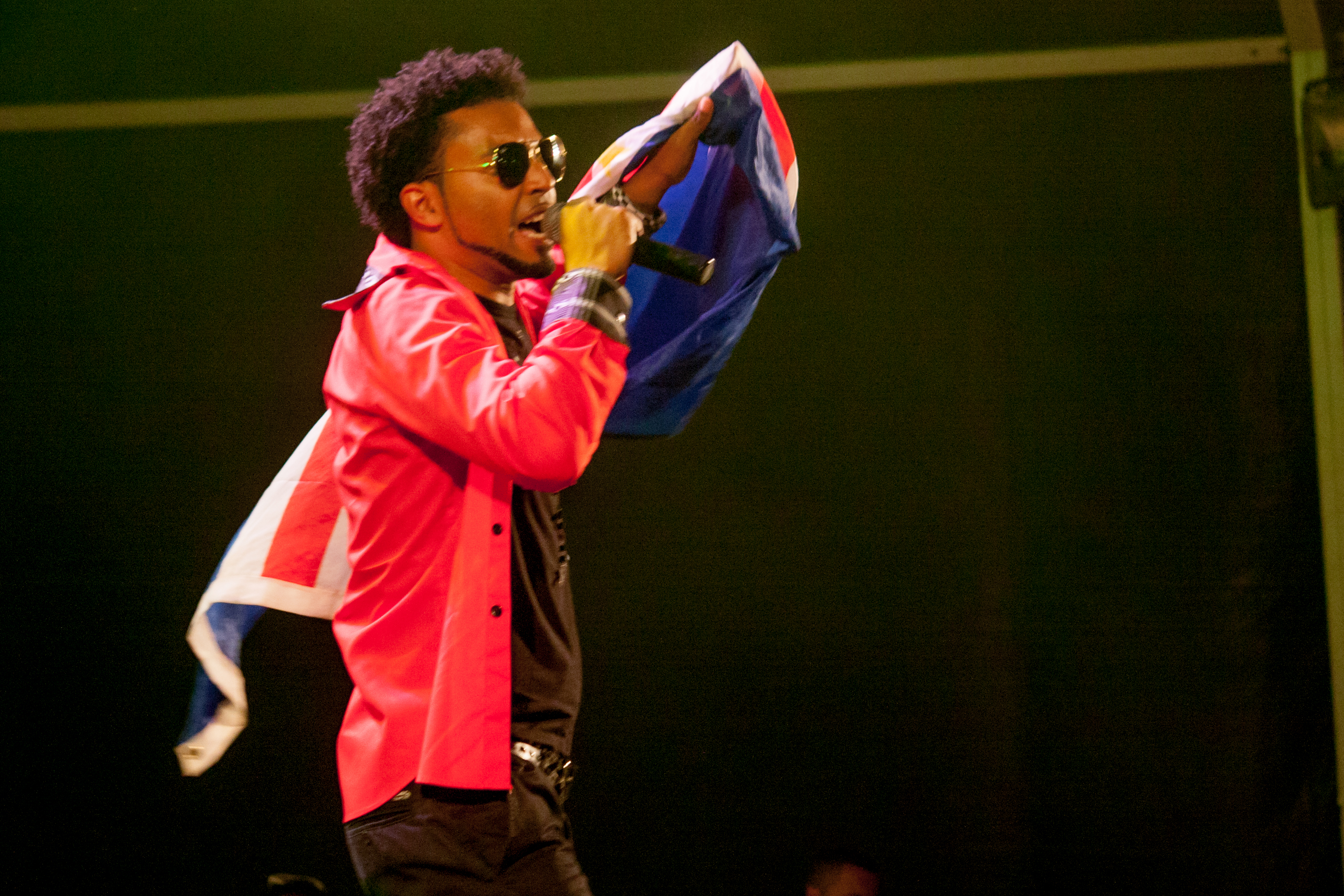
- Gil Semedo Live

Background information
- Born: Gil Semedo Moreira; October 25, 1974 (age 51); Santa Catarina, Portuguese Cape Verde
- Genres: Caboswing, Zouk, Pop, R&B, Coladeira, Funana, Batuco
- Occupations: Singer, songwriter, music producer, record executive
- Years active: 1991–present
- Website: www.gilsemedo.com

Gil Semedo Moreira (born October 25, 1974), better known by his stage name Gil Semedo, is a Cape Verdean recording artist, songwriter, businessman, and record producer. He rose to prominence in 1991 following the release of "Menina", the first single from his debut album bearing the same name. Gil is one of the most famous musicians who sings in the Cabo Verdean language (Kriolu), having sold over a million records and creating his own music genre ‘Cabo Swing’ (a combination of traditional Cape Verdean music styles such as Coladeira, Funana and Batuko mixed with zouk, pop and R&B).

== Early life ==
Gil Semedo was born in Santiago, Cape Verde, and at age six moved to the Netherlands, where he still lives. He got his breakthrough in 1990 when he reached the finals on the Dutch talent TV show Sound Mix Show at age fifteen. He would go on to release his first single ‘Menina’ the following year, in 1991.
