= Assomada =

- Settlement
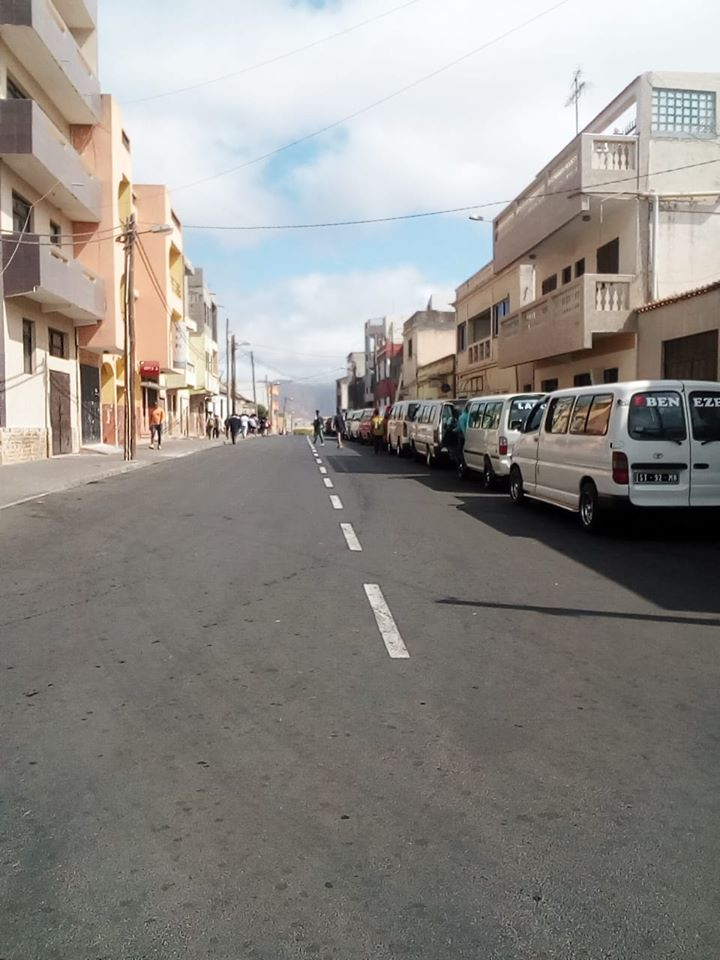
- City of Assomada

- Location within Cape Verde
- Coordinates: 15.096°N 23.667°W
- Country: Cape Verde
- Island: Santiago
- Municipality: Santa Catarina
- Civil parish: Santa Catarina
- Elevation: 560 m (1,840 ft)

Population (2010)
  - Total: 12,332
- ID: 72152

Assomada is a city on the Sotavento (leeward) island of Santiago in Cape Verde. Since 1912, it is the seat of the municipality of Santa Catarina, which comprises the central western part and much of the interior of the island. It is the largest city in that region.

== Geography ==
Assomada lies at about 550 m (1,800 ft) elevation on a plateau surrounded by mountains, farmland, and hills in the center of Santa Catarina. Assomada is located 26 km (16 mi) northwest of Praia. It has an urban area of about 550 ha (1,400 acres). In 2021, it had about 21,297 inhabitants, making it the second largest city on the island. Assomada plays an important commercial role and has a pleasant combination of urban areas and fields. Assomada lies near the midpoint of the highway that runs the length of the island of Santiago from Praia (the capital) in the south to the northern port of Tarrafal (EN1-ST01).

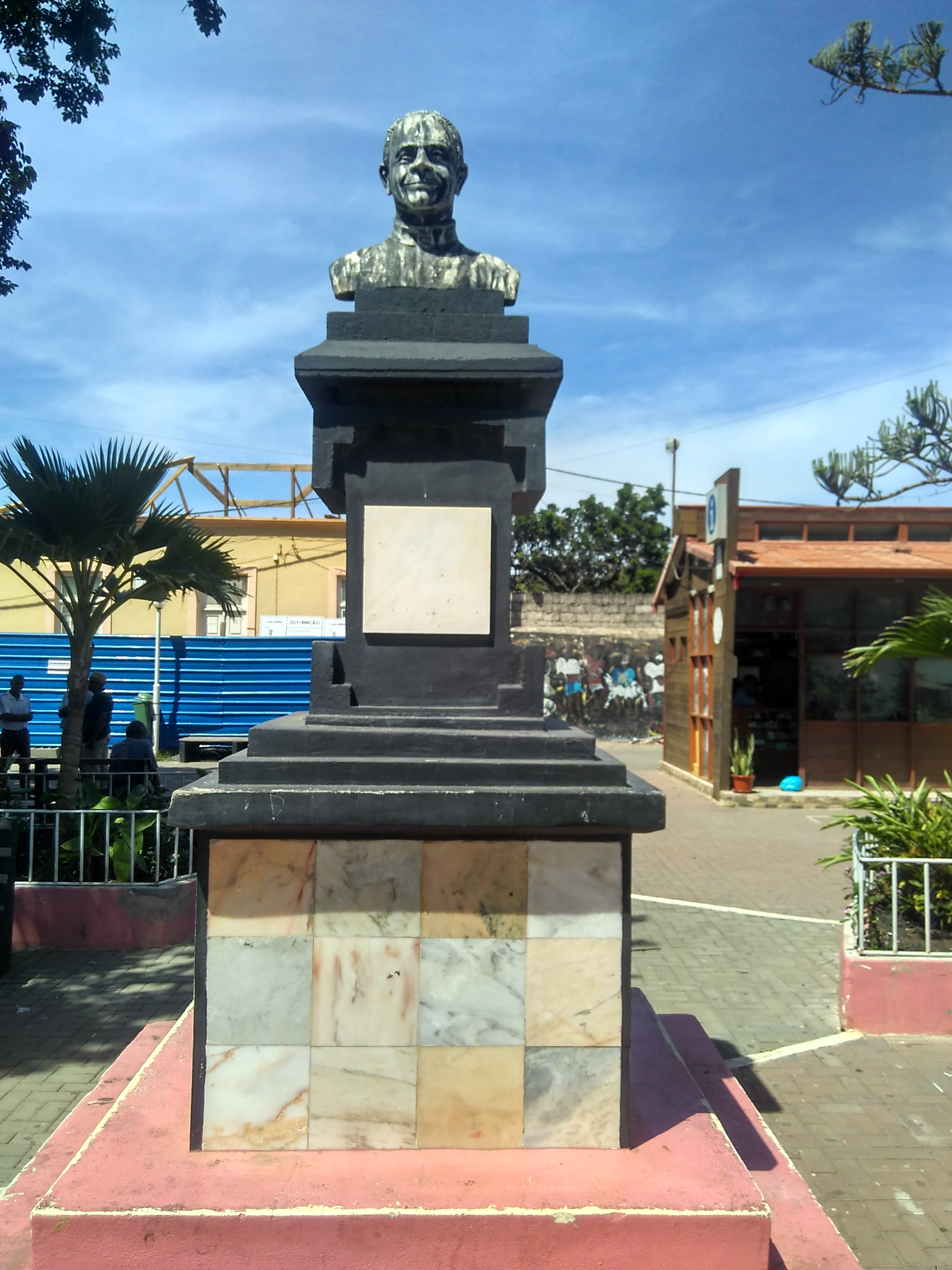
A bust of Father Louis Allaz

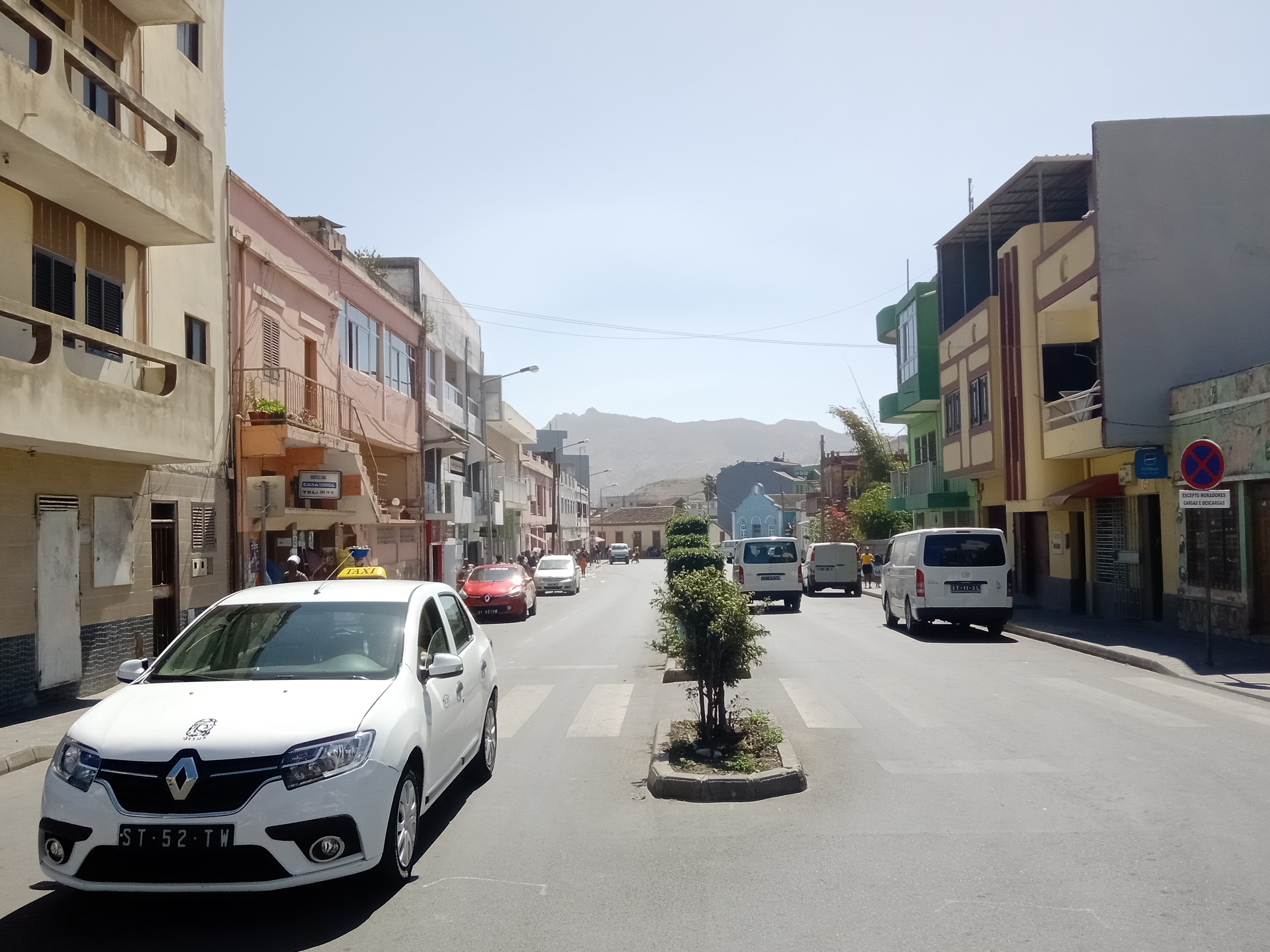
Cutelo neighborhood

=== Subdivisions ===
Assomada is subdivided into 22 neighborhoods including Achada Riba, Atrás de Banco, Bolanha, the City Center (central part), Chã de Santos, Covão, Covão Ribeiro, Cruz Vermelha, Cumbém (located in the south), Cutelo, Cutelo Somada, Espinho Branco, Leiria, Lém Vieira, Matinho, Nhagar (located in the north), Pedra Barro, Ponta Fonte Lima, Portãozinho, Tarafalinho and Tras da Empa (Traz d'Empa).

=== Landmarks ===
- The market of Assomada, founded in 1931 is one of the largest on the island of Santiago, with a large variety of agricultural products and crafts.
- Centro Cultural Norberto Tavares, in the former post office, home to the Museu da Tabanca until 2008.

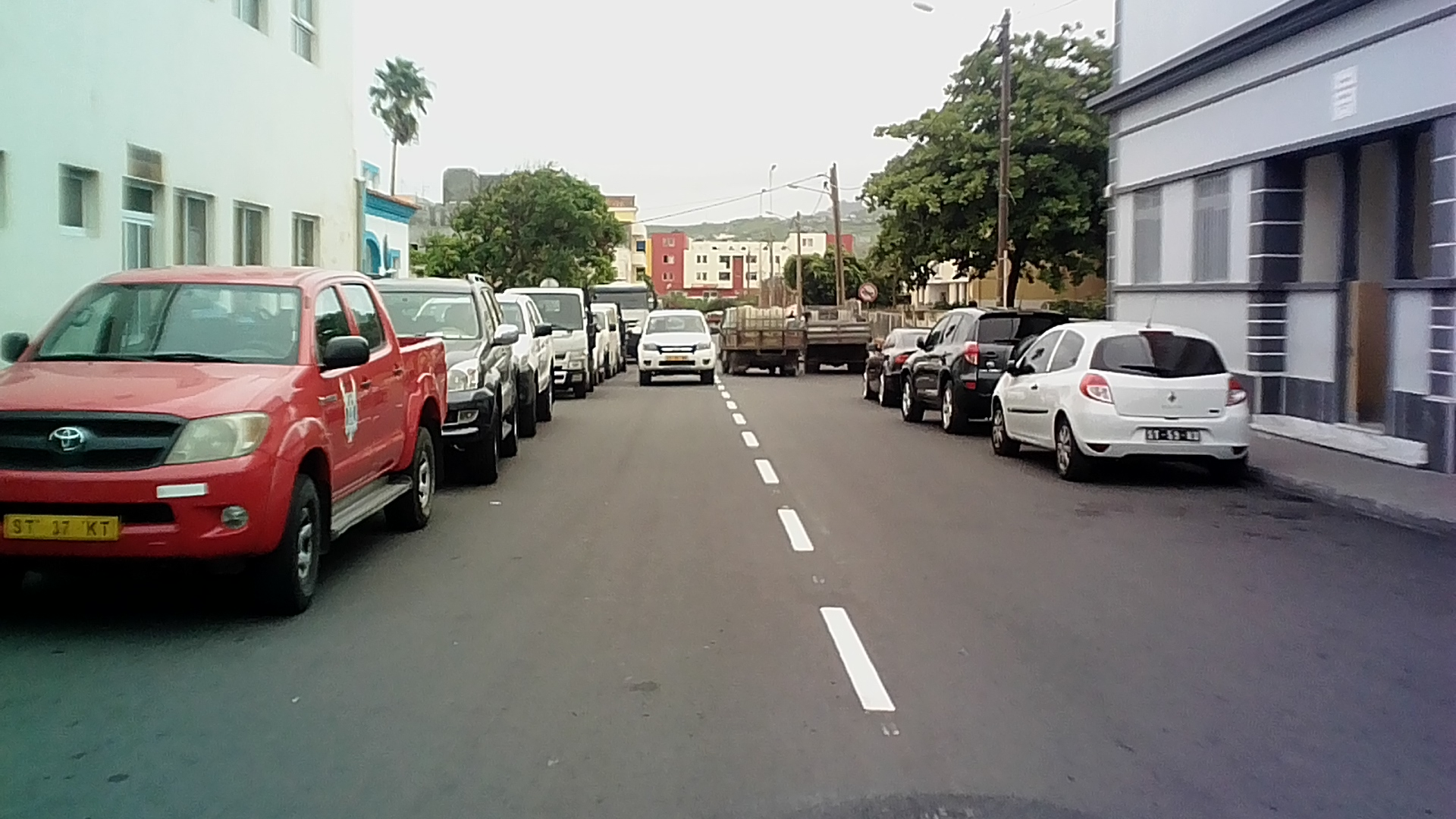
Downtown Assomada

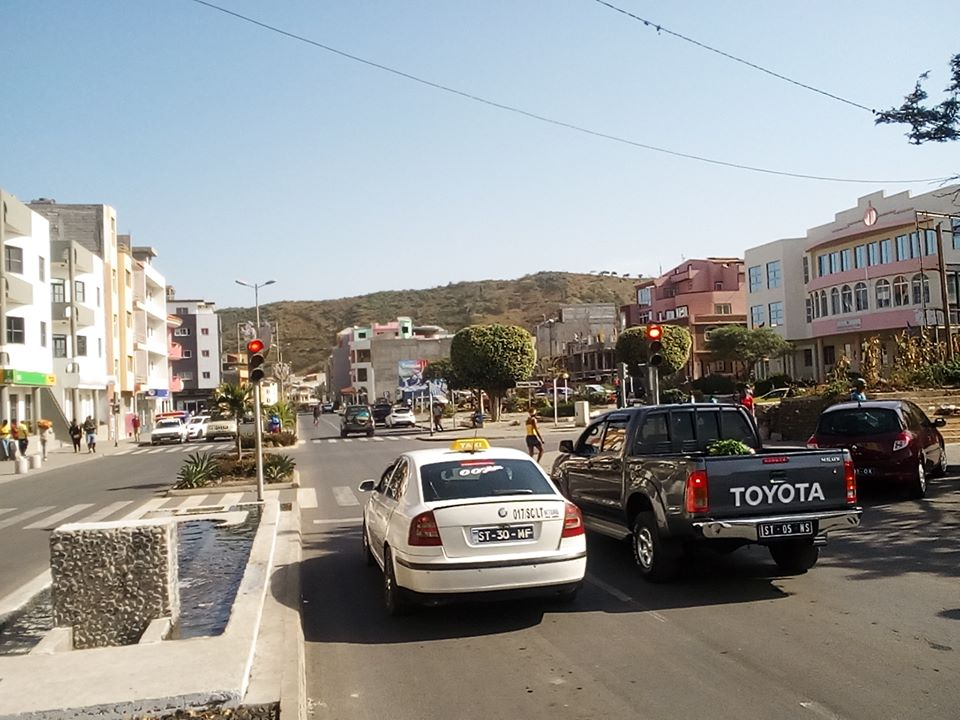
Freedom Avenue, Assomada

== Demography ==
According to Cabo Verde 2021 Census, there were 21,297 inhabitants in the city of Assomada.

Historical population
Year	Pop.	±%
1990	3,414	—
2000	7,067	+107.0%
2005	11,900	+68.4%
2010	12,332	+3.6%
2021	21,297	+72.7%

The age and sex distribution at the 2010 census were:

Sex	Residential population	Age		
Sex	Residential population	Under 15	Between 15 and 64	65 and over
Total	12332	3760	7967	605
Male	5900	1814	3850	234
Female	6432	1946	4115	371

== Education ==
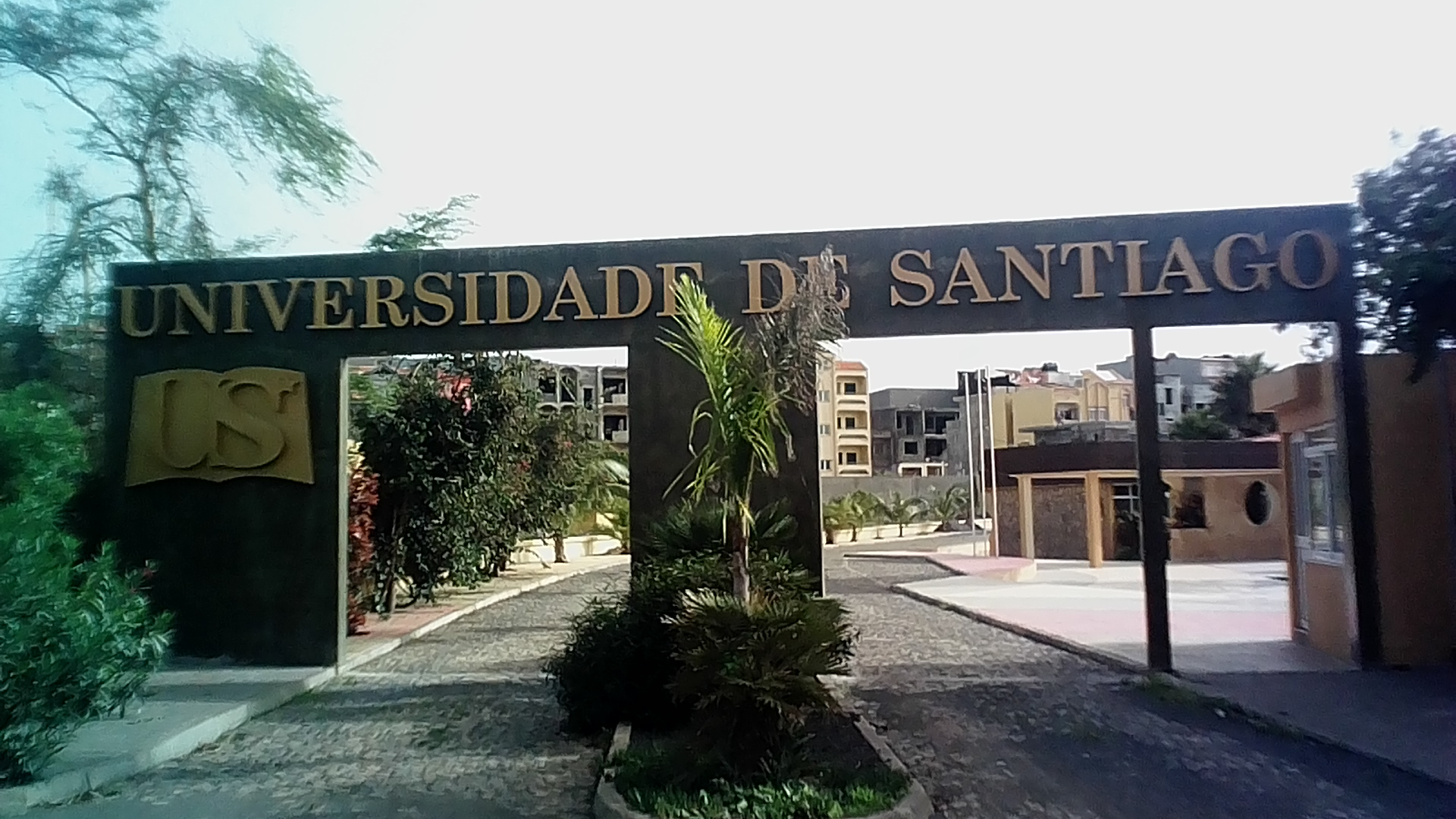
University of Santiago

In addition to a vocational school (i.e., Escola de Formação Profissional), Assomada is home to the University of Santiago, which is a major Cabo Verdean university and a private one, an extensive school complex, including a public high school (Amilcar Cabral High School), two private secondary schools (Centro de Ensino de Assomada and Escola Secundária Abrolhos) and a primary school (escola primária). It is also home to an elite technical high school (i.e.,Grand Duke Henri Technical High School), which trains the most promising Cape Verdean youth in career skills.

== Economy ==
Commerce, financial services (particularly banking), transport, and educational services are the lifeblood of the city. Among the financial entities that contribute much to the local economy are: six commercial banks, hundreds of retail and wholesale businesses, a relatively large fleet of taxis and minivans, schools (including private secondary schools and a private university). The residents of the city of Assomada enjoy the highest living standards on the island of Santiago.

== Notable people ==
- Orlanda Amarílis, writer
- Victor Borges (or Victor Barbosa), Minister of Foreign Affairs from 2004 to 2008
- Danielson Gomes Monteiro, better known as Dani, footballer
- José Maria Neves, Prime Minister of Cape Verde between 2001 and 2016 and President of Cabo Verde from 2021–present
- Gilyto Semedo, singer
- Jovane Cabral, soccer player
