= Administrative divisions of Cape Verde =

The territory of Cape Verde is divided into 22 concelhos (municipalities), and subdivided into 32 freguesias (equivalent to civil parish).

In Portuguese language usage, there are two words to distinguish the territory and the administrative organ. Administratively, right below the government, there are the municípios (municipalities), which administer the concelhos. Therefore, the concelhos are the first-level administrative subdivision in Cape Verde. Each municipality has an Assembleia Municipal (municipal assembly, the legislative body) and a Câmara Municipal (municipal chamber, the executive body). Every four years elections are held for the Assembleia Municipal, the Câmara Municipal and the President of the Câmara Municipal. Where a municipality consists of several freguesias (civil parishes), a Delegação Municipal (municipal delegation) is established in the parishes that do not contain the municipal seat.

The islands are traditionally divided in two geographic regions (with no administrative meaning):

- Barlavento Islands (windward), the six northern islands and
- Sotavento Islands (leeward), the four southern ones.

== Municipalities and civil parishes ==
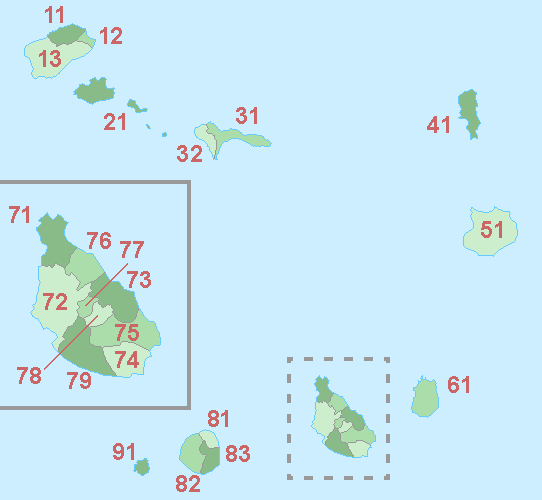
Municipalities of Cape Verde

Island group: Barlavento Islands Sotavento Islands

Map #	Municipality	Island(s)	Area (km^{2})	Population (2010 census)	Population (2021 Census)	Population density (km^{2})	Parishes
71	Municipality of Tarrafal	Santiago	120.8	18,565	16,620	137.58	Santo Amaro Abade
76	Municipality of São Miguel	Santiago	77.4	15,648	12,906	166.74	São Miguel Arcanjo
77	Municipality of São Salvador do Mundo	Santiago	26.5	8,677	7,452	281.2	São Salvador do Mundo
73	Municipality of Santa Cruz	Santiago	112.2	26,609	25,004	222.85	Santiago Maior
75	Municipality of São Domingos	Santiago	147.5	13,808	13,958	94.63	Nossa Senhora da Luz; São Nicolau Tolentino
74	Municipality of Praia	Santiago	102.6	131,602	142,009	1384.1	Nossa Senhora da Graça
79	Municipality of Ribeira Grande de Santiago	Santiago	137.3	8,325	7,632	55.59	Santíssimo Nome de Jesus; São João Baptista
78	Municipality of São Lourenço dos Órgãos	Santiago	36.9	7,388	6,317	171.19	São Lourenço dos Órgãos
72	Municipality of Santa Catarina	Santiago	242.6	43,297	37,472	154.46	Santa Catarina
91	Municipality of Brava	Brava	62.5	5,995	5,594	89.5	São João Baptista; Nossa Senhora do Monte
82	Municipality of São Filipe	Fogo	228.8	22,248	20,732	90.61	São Lourenço; Nossa Senhora da Conceição
83	Municipality of Santa Catarina do Fogo	Fogo	153.0	5,299	4,725	30.88	Santa Catarina do Fogo
81	Municipality of Mosteiros	Fogo	89.5	9,524	8,062	90.08	Nossa Senhora da Ajuda
61	Municipality of Maio	Maio	274.5	6,952	6,298	22.94	Nossa Senhora da Luz
51	Municipality of Boa Vista	Boa Vista	631.1	9,162	12,613	19.98	Santa Isabel; São João Baptista
41	Municipality of Sal	Sal	219.8	25,765	33,347	151.72	Nossa Senhora das Dores
31	Municipality of Ribeira Brava	São Nicolau	224.8	7,580	6,978	31.04	Nossa Senhora da Lapa; Nossa Senhora do Rosário
32	Municipality of Tarrafal de São Nicolau	São Nicolau	119.8	5,237	5,261	43.91	São Francisco
21	Municipality of São Vicente	São Vicente, Santa Luzia¹	260.9	76,107	74,016	283.69	Nossa Senhora da Luz
13	Municipality of Porto Novo	Santo Antão	564.3	18,028	15,914	28.2	São João Baptista; Santo André
11	Municipality of Ribeira Grande	Santo Antão	166.5	18,890	15,022	90.22	Nossa Senhora do Rosário; Nossa Senhora do Livramento; Santo Crucifixo; São Pedro Apóstolo
12	Municipality of Paul	Santo Antão	54.3	6,997	5,696	104.9	Santo António das Pombas

¹The uninhabited island of Santa Luzia and all its uninhabited islets, Raso and Branco, are part of the Municipality of São Vicente.

== See also ==
- ISO 3166-2:CV
