= Geography of Cape Verde =

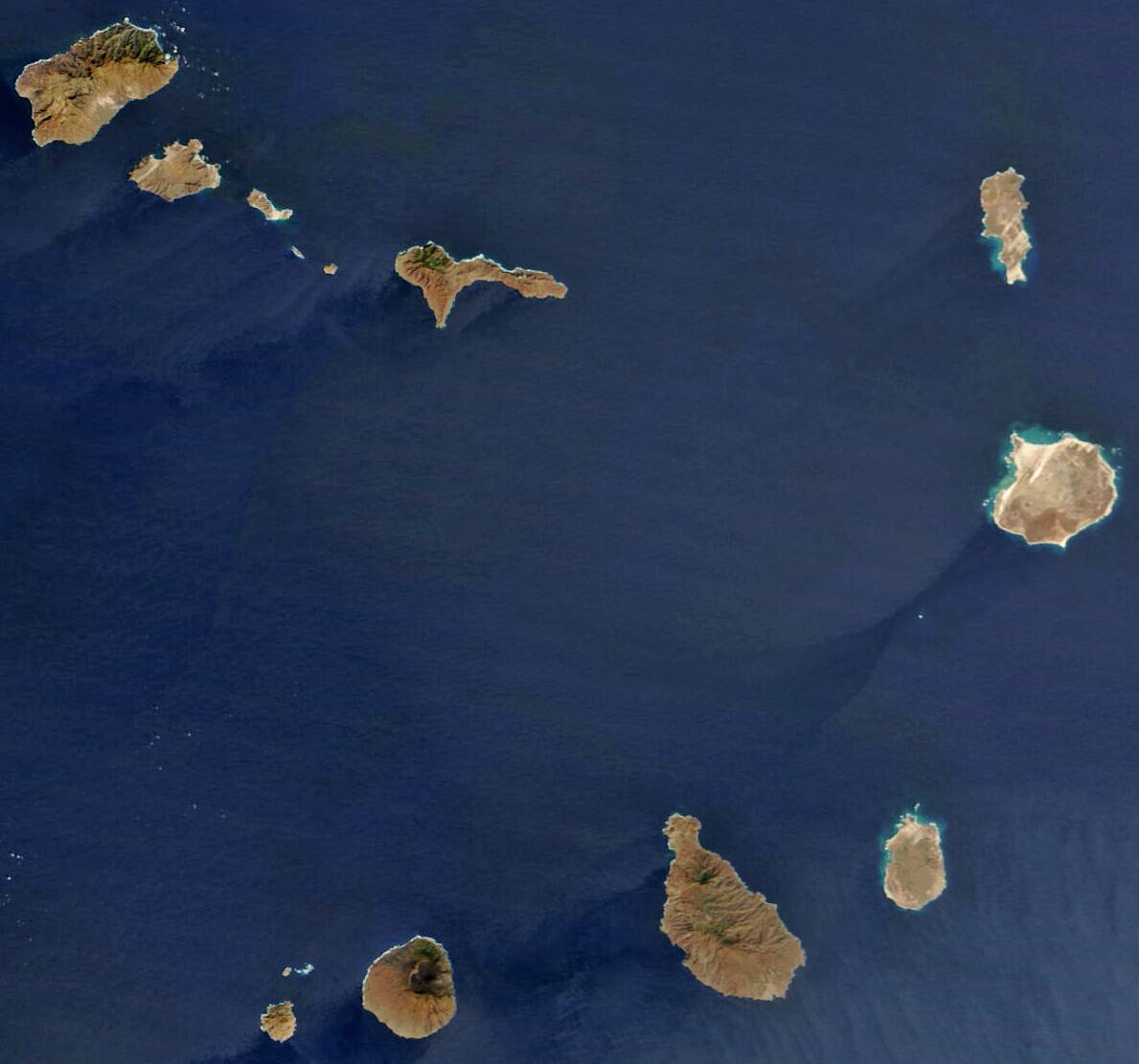
- Continent: Africa
- Region: Atlantic Ocean
- Coordinates: 16°N 24°W
- Area: Ranked 165th
  - Total: 4,033 km^{2} (1,557 sq mi)
  - Land: 100%
  - Water: 0%
- Coastline: 965 km (600 mi)
- Borders: None
- Highest point: Mount Fogo; 2,829 metres (9,281 ft)
- Lowest point: Atlantic Ocean; 0 metres (0 ft)
- Exclusive economic zone: 800,561 km^{2} (309,098 mi^{2})

Map of the Cape Verde Islands.

Cabo Verde, officially known as Republic of Cabo Verde, is a group of arid Atlantic islands which are home to distinct communities of plants, birds, and reptiles.

== Location and description ==
The Cape Verde Islands are located in the mid-Atlantic Ocean some 450 km (280 mi) off the west coast of the continent of Africa. The landscape varies from dry plains to high active volcanoes with cliffs rising steeply from the ocean. The climate is arid. The total size is 4,033 km^{2} (1,557 mi^{2}).

The archipelago consists of ten islands and five smaller islands known as islets, divided into the windward (Barlavento) and leeward (Sotavento) groups.

The six islands in the Barlavento group, which sits in the trade winds, are Santo Antão, São Vicente, Santa Luzia, São Nicolau, Sal, and Boa Vista. The total land mass is 2,239 km^{2} (864 sq mi).

In the west of the Barlavento group, Santo Antão, São Vicente, (Note: plus islet Ilhéu dos Pássaros) São Nicolau, Santa Luzia and islets Branco and Raso are volcanic and somewhat rocky yet quite widely capable of supporting semi-arid agriculture.

In the east of the Barlavento group, Sal (Note: plus islet Ilhéu Rabo de Junco) and Boa Vista (Note: plus islets Ilhéu de Sal-Rei and Ilhéu do Baluarte) are lightly hilled, desert islands whose economies were based on salt and rely on fishing and tourism, having more in common with the Sotavento island Maio.

There are four main islands of the Sotavento group. The western three islands, Brava, Fogo and Santiago, are rocky and volcanic agricultural islands, with the longest histories of human habitation. The fourth and easternmost island Maio is a flat desert island whose economy was primarily based on salt, giving it more in common with the Barlavento islands Sal and Boa Vista. The Ilhéus do Rombo are barren islets north of Brava. The total area of the Sotavento Islands is 1,803 km^{2} (696 sq mi).

Three islands – Sal, Boa Vista, and Maio – generally are level and lack natural water supplies. Mountains higher than 1,280 metres (4,199 ft) are found on Santiago, Fogo, Santo Antão, and São Nicolau.

Sand carried by strong winds has caused erosion on all islands, especially the windward ones. Sheer, jagged cliffs rise from the sea on several of the mountainous islands. The lack of natural vegetation in the uplands and coast also contributes to soil erosion. The interior valleys support denser natural vegetation.

== List of islands ==
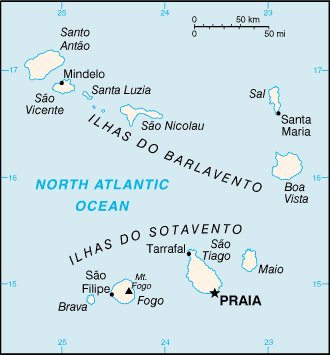
Map

Island or islet	Largest Settlement	Other Settlements	Area (km^{2})	Population
Barlavento Islands			2,265.55	179,114
Santo Antão	Porto Novo	Ribeira Grande, Pombas, Ponta do Sol	779.0	46,872
São Vicente	Mindelo		227.0	81,267
Ilhéu dos Pássaros	uninhabited		0.05	0
Santa Luzia	uninhabited		34.0	0
Ilhéu Raso	uninhabited		7.0	0
Ilhéu Branco	uninhabited		3.0	0
São Nicolau	Ribeira Brava	Tarrafal de São Nicolau	379.5	13,680
Sal	Espargos	Santa Maria	216.0	27,515
Boa Vista	Sal Rei	Estância de Baixo	620.0	9,779
Sotavento Islands			1,806.95	345,886
Maio	Vila do Maio	Calheta	269.0	7,420
Santiago	Praia	Assomada, Tarrafal, Calheta de São Miguel, Pedra Badejo, Cidade Velha	991.0	292,500
Fogo	São Filipe	Mosteiros, Cova Figueira	475.6	39,567
Brava	Nova Sintra	Furna	66.6	6,399
Ilhéus Secos	uninhabited		4.75	0

== Data ==
Geographic coordinates
16°N 24°W

Area
- Total: 4,072 km^{2}
- Land: 4,072 km^{2}
- Water: 0 km^{2} (inland water is negligible)
Area – comparative
About 1.5 times as large as Luxembourg
Coastline
965 km (600 mi)
Maritime claims
- Measured from claimed archipelagic baselines
- Territorial sea: 12 nmi (22.2 km)
- Contiguous zone: 24 nmi (44.4 km)
- Exclusive economic zone: 200 nmi (370.4 km)
Exclusive economic zone
- EEZ area: 800,561 km^{2} (309,098 mi^{2})
- Continental shelf: 5,591 km^{2}
- Coral reefs: 0.09% of world
- Sea mounts: 0.04% of world
Terrain
Steep, rugged, rocky, volcanic.
Elevation extremes

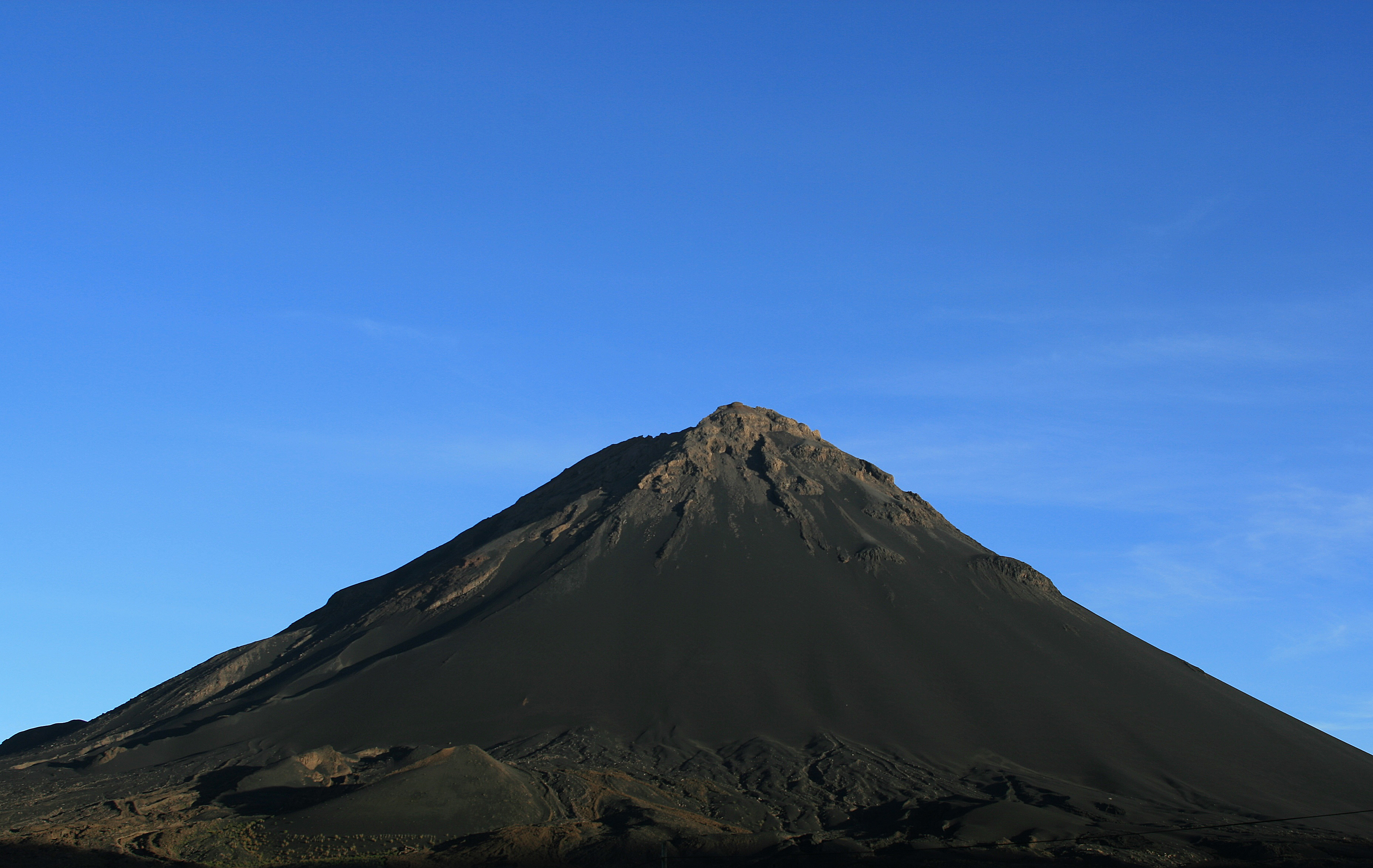
Mount Fogo, the highest point in Cabo Verde

- Lowest point: Atlantic Ocean 0 m
- Highest point: Mount Fogo 2,829 m (9,281 ft) (a volcano on Fogo Island)

Natural resources:Salt, basalt rock, limestone, kaolin, fish, clay, gypsum

Land use
- agricultural land: 18.6% (2018 est.)
  - arable land: 11.7% (2018 est.)
  - permanent crops: 0.7% (2018 est.)
  - permanent pasture: 6.2% (2018 est.)
- forest: 21% (2018 est.)
- other: 60.4% (2018 est.)
Irrigated land
35 km^{2} (14 sq mi) (2012)
Total renewable water resources
0.3 km^{3} (2017)
Freshwater withdrawal (domestic/industrial/agricultural)
- total: 0.02 km^{3}/yr (6%/1%/93%)
- per capita: 48.57 m^{3}/yr (2004)
Natural hazards
Prolonged droughts; seasonal harmattan wind produces obscuring dust; volcanically and seismically active.
Geography - note
Strategic location 500 km from west coast of Africa near major north-south sea routes; important communications station; important sea and air refueling site.

== Borders ==
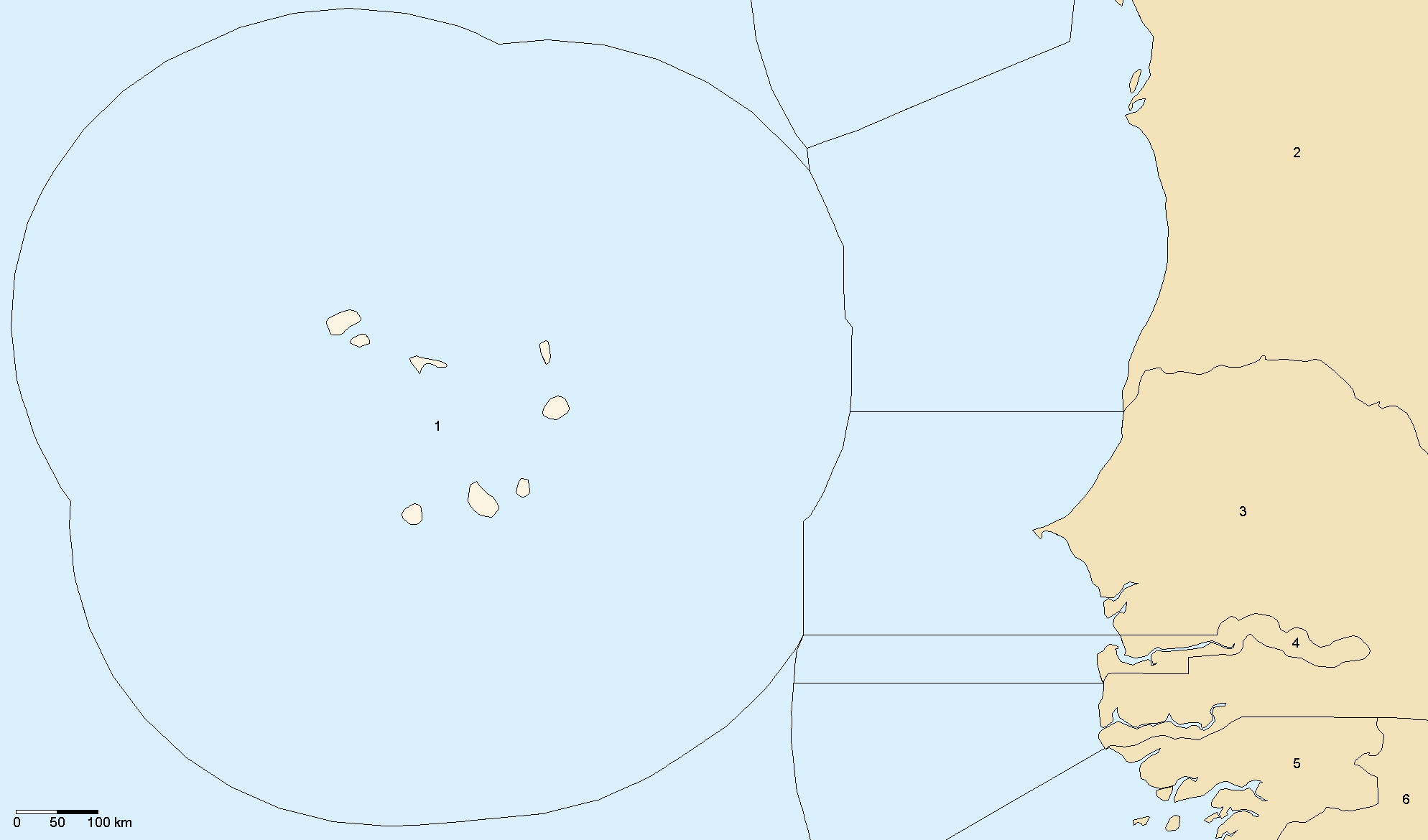
Map of Cape Verde's EEZ.

Cabo Verde shares maritime boundaries with Mauritania and Senegal. Cabo Verde has signed treaties with Senegal and Mauritania delimiting the specific boundaries. However, the two treaties conflict in their delimitation of the precise borders. Due to the numerous islands it has an Exclusive Economic Zone of 800,561 km^{2} (309,098 mi^{2}).

== Climate ==
Sal Island

Climate chart (precipitation, max. and min. temperature)
J	F	M	A	M	J	J	A	S	O	N	D
3 23 17	2 22 15	0 24 18	0 25 20	0 26 21	0 27 22	8 28 24	97 29 24	115 30 25	31 28 23	8 26 21	4 24 19
- █ Average max. and min. temperatures in °C
- █ Precipitation totals in mm
- Source: BBC Weather
Imperial conversion
J	F	M	A	M	J	J	A	S	O	N	D
0.1 73 63	0.1 72 59	0 75 64	0 77 68	0 79 70	0 81 72	0.3 82 75	3.8 84 75	4.5 86 77	1.2 82 73	0.3 79 70	0.2 75 66
- █ Average max. and min. temperatures in °F
- █ Precipitation totals in inches

Rainfall is irregular, historically causing periodic droughts and famines. Desalination plants now provide water to more than half the country's population. Experiments with fog collectors have been conducted since 1962, however, such collectors had not been expanded beyond the Serra Malagueta community of Santiago Island, as of 2009. The average precipitation per year in Praia is 240 mm (9.45 in).

During the winter, storms blowing from the Sahara sometimes cloud the sky; however, sunny days are the norm year round. The clearest skies are found between February and June, with very little rainfall during these months. Saharan dust, Harmattan wind, laden with dust come from the Sahara. This occurs between November and March and is generally similar to the "Calima" affecting the Canary Islands.

The ocean near Cabo Verde is an area of tropical cyclone formation; since these storms have the whole Atlantic over which to develop as they move westward, they are among the most intense hurricanes, and are called Cape Verde-type hurricanes.

The Cape Verde islands are a very degradated area. Also, most islands do not always get a monsoon. In fact, it is not surprising that some atmospheric precipitation of islands are limited in tropical rain.

If rain arrives, it is usually between August and October. The first "rainy season" brings high temperatures and high humidity that condenses as dew mountain. The other rainy season is between December and June, when the northeast trade winds are common during this season, only altitudes above 600 m tend to receive regular rain. The island of Sal receives an average of 0 mm in May. When the rain comes, if it comes, it can be very strong. Half of the rain in a particular year can often fall into a single storm. Most of the Cape Verde islands are dry, but on islands with high mountains and farther away from the continental land mass, by orography, the humidity is much higher, giving a rainforest habitat, very degraded by the strong human presence. Northeastern slopes of high mountains often receive a lot of rain and southwestern slopes do not. This is because they are umbria areas, situated in the north hillsides or slopes of the mountainous areas, oriented behind the Sun in the Northern Hemisphere, in the shadyside orographic. So the amount of solar radiation that it receive is much lower than it would if it had without the island's relief which intercepts much of the sunlight. In terms of botanical ecology, these umbria areas are identified as being cool and moist.

The current north of the Canaries, has a cooling effect on the islands of Cabo Verde, making the air temperature more bearable than it would expect in any case at this latitude. Conversely, the islands do not receive the upwellings (cold streams) that affect the West African coast, so the air temperature is cooler than in Senegal, but the sea is actually warmer, because the orographic relief of some islands, such as Sao Miguel with steep mountains, cover it with rich woods and luxuriant vegetation where the humid air condenses and soak the plants, rocks, soil, logs, and moss.

Hurricanes often begin forming in the waters around the islands of Cabo Verde, but it is rare that the strength of the storm reaches close to the islands. A Cape Verde type hurricane is formed in the area south of the islands, near Sao Miguel, after a tropical wave on the African continent during the rainy season. The storm picks up strength when it crosses the warm waters of Atlantic.

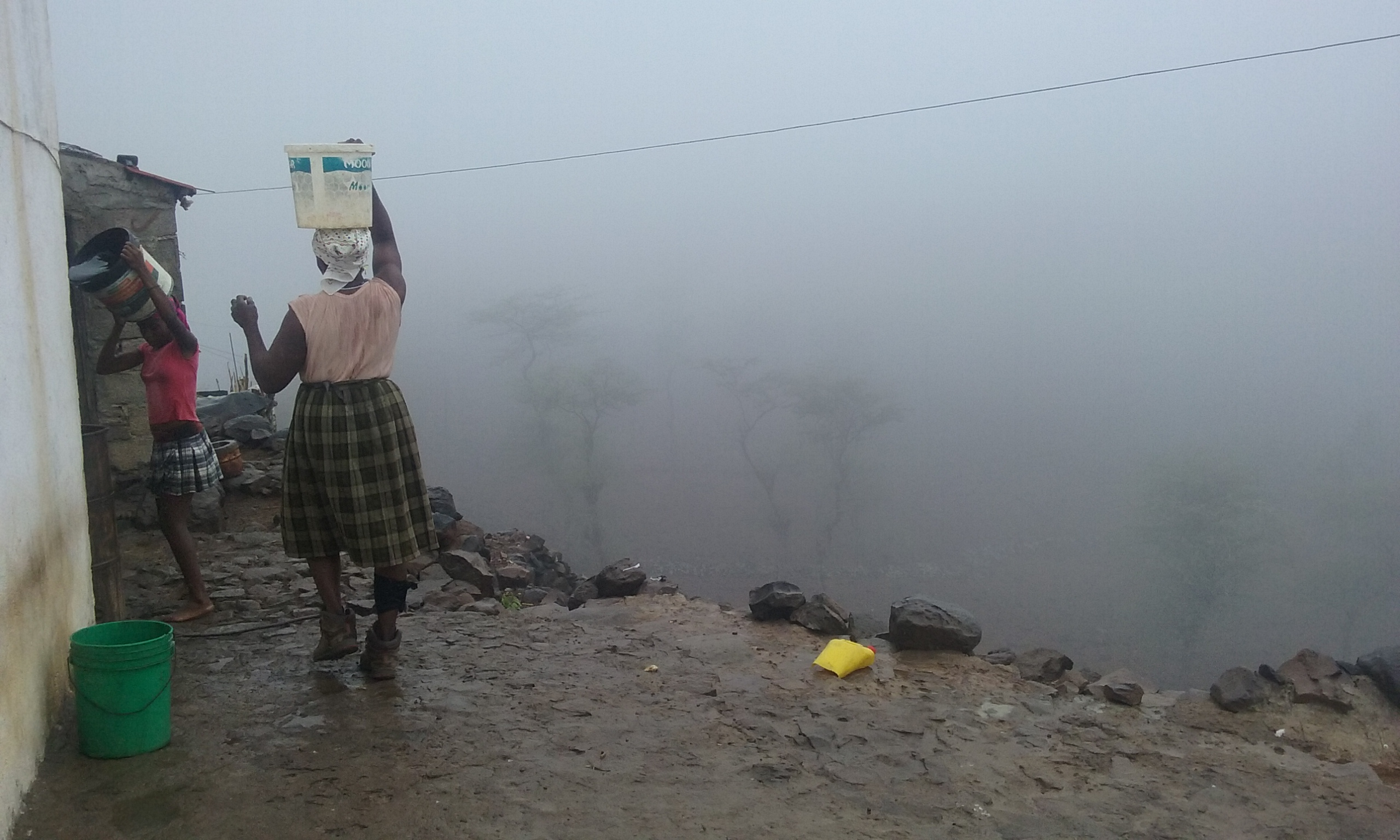
Fog on Cape Verde

The laurel forest is a type of cloud forest, the cloud forests, are developed preferably about mountains, where the dense moisture from the sea or ocean, is precipitated by the action of the relief. Opposing the terrain to a front of warm, moist air mass, it forces to increase the height above sea level of that body wet and warm air mass, which cools and decreases the dew point, causing it to condense part of the moisture that falls as rain or fog, creating a habitat especially cool, saturated with moisture in the air and soil.

It is the balance between the dry and warm influence of the subtropical anticyclone, hot and dry summer and orography the responsible for carrying cool wet air. As latitude increases, this increases the impact of the storms, which in its journey from west to east, swept the western coasts of continents, dumping heavy rains as carrying high humidity. Precipitation multiply if these air masses are crossing mountains in the way. The resulting climate is wetter, but with an annual oscillation of the temperature moderated by the proximity of the ocean. Appear mostly occupying favorable areas named geographically Umbrias, this is north hillsides or slopes of the mountainous areas that are oriented behind the sun, because the islands are in the Northern Hemisphere, between 600 and 1,500 meters, thus benefiting from the humidity provided by the trade winds to form such a sea of clouds. In its botanical ecology, the mountain umbria is identified with cool and moisture.

Climate data for Praia (Nelson Mandela International Airport) 1981–2010
Month	Jan	Feb	Mar	Apr	May	Jun	Jul	Aug	Sep	Oct	Nov	Dec	Year
Record high °C (°F)	31.9 (89.4)	33.1 (91.6)	34.2 (93.6)	33.4 (92.1)	33.3 (91.9)	34.1 (93.4)	32.5 (90.5)	33.1 (91.6)	36.2 (97.2)	34.8 (94.6)	33.0 (91.4)	31.0 (87.8)	36.2 (97.2)
Mean daily maximum °C (°F)	26.5 (79.7)	27.0 (80.6)	28.1 (82.6)	28.2 (82.8)	28.9 (84.0)	29.6 (85.3)	29.6 (85.3)	30.4 (86.7)	30.9 (87.6)	31.0 (87.8)	29.7 (85.5)	27.7 (81.9)	29.0 (84.2)
Daily mean °C (°F)	22.9 (73.2)	22.9 (73.2)	23.6 (74.5)	23.9 (75.0)	24.7 (76.5)	25.5 (77.9)	26.1 (79.0)	27.1 (80.8)	27.4 (81.3)	27.2 (81.0)	26.1 (79.0)	24.1 (75.4)	25.1 (77.2)
Mean daily minimum °C (°F)	19.3 (66.7)	19.2 (66.6)	19.5 (67.1)	19.9 (67.8)	20.7 (69.3)	21.6 (70.9)	22.7 (72.9)	23.9 (75.0)	24.2 (75.6)	23.6 (74.5)	22.5 (72.5)	20.8 (69.4)	21.5 (70.7)
Record low °C (°F)	16.9 (62.4)	16.2 (61.2)	16.5 (61.7)	17.0 (62.6)	18.8 (65.8)	19.2 (66.6)	20.3 (68.5)	20.6 (69.1)	19.6 (67.3)	19.6 (67.3)	19.5 (67.1)	17.3 (63.1)	16.2 (61.2)
Average precipitation mm (inches)	3.1 (0.12)	0.6 (0.02)	0.3 (0.01)	0.0 (0.0)	0.5 (0.02)	0.0 (0.0)	8.0 (0.31)	60.4 (2.38)	60.9 (2.40)	31.0 (1.22)	2.7 (0.11)	5.0 (0.20)	172.5 (6.79)
Average precipitation days (≥ 0.1 mm)	1	0	0	0	0	0	2	7	7	4	2	1	24
Average relative humidity (%)	65.7	63.3	62.6	64.5	65.2	68.5	73.3	76.0	76.8	72.9	69.8	70.1	69.1
Mean monthly sunshine hours	223.2	234.5	279.0	285.0	306.9	279.0	217.0	201.5	216.0	244.9	234.0	204.6	2,925.6
Mean daily sunshine hours	7.2	8.3	9.0	9.5	9.9	9.3	7.0	6.5	7.2	7.9	7.8	6.6	8.0
Source 1: Instituto Nacional de Meteorologia e Geofísica
Source 2: Deutscher Wetterdienst (extremes, precipitation days, and sun)

Climate data for Sal, Cape Verde (Amílcar Cabral International Airport) 1981–2010, extremes 1950–1990
Month	Jan	Feb	Mar	Apr	May	Jun	Jul	Aug	Sep	Oct	Nov	Dec	Year
Record high °C (°F)	32 (90)	30 (86)	33 (91)	33 (91)	33 (91)	34 (93)	33 (91)	33 (91)	38 (100)	34 (93)	33 (91)	30 (86)	38 (100)
Mean daily maximum °C (°F)	24.8 (76.6)	25.0 (77.0)	25.3 (77.5)	25.6 (78.1)	26.1 (79.0)	27.0 (80.6)	27.9 (82.2)	29.5 (85.1)	30.1 (86.2)	29.5 (85.1)	28.1 (82.6)	26.1 (79.0)	27.1 (80.8)
Daily mean °C (°F)	21.5 (70.7)	21.2 (70.2)	21.5 (70.7)	22.0 (71.6)	22.6 (72.7)	23.6 (74.5)	24.8 (76.6)	26.2 (79.2)	26.8 (80.2)	26.1 (79.0)	24.6 (76.3)	22.8 (73.0)	23.6 (74.5)
Mean daily minimum °C (°F)	18.9 (66.0)	18.5 (65.3)	18.7 (65.7)	19.3 (66.7)	20.2 (68.4)	21.3 (70.3)	22.5 (72.5)	23.8 (74.8)	24.4 (75.9)	23.6 (74.5)	22.0 (71.6)	20.3 (68.5)	21.1 (70.0)
Record low °C (°F)	12 (54)	10 (50)	12 (54)	15 (59)	15 (59)	15 (59)	17 (63)	20 (68)	20 (68)	19 (66)	17 (63)	16 (61)	10 (50)
Average precipitation mm (inches)	6.7 (0.26)	2.3 (0.09)	1.3 (0.05)	0.7 (0.03)	0.5 (0.02)	0.0 (0.0)	1.2 (0.05)	13.9 (0.55)	28.1 (1.11)	11.0 (0.43)	2.1 (0.08)	3.4 (0.13)	71.2 (2.8)
Average precipitation days (≥ 0.1 mm)	1	1	0	0	0	0	0	2	3	1	1	0	10
Average relative humidity (%)	69.0	70.9	70.9	70.6	73.3	75.4	75.5	75.9	77.1	74.7	72.9	71.1	73.1
Mean monthly sunshine hours	182.9	175.2	201.5	216.0	204.6	174.0	148.8	161.2	180.0	198.4	189.0	155.0	2,186.6
Mean daily sunshine hours	5.9	6.2	6.5	7.2	6.6	5.8	4.8	5.2	6.0	6.4	6.3	5.0	6.0
Source 1: Instituto Nacional de Meteorologia e Geofísica
Source 2: Deutscher Wetterdienst (extremes, precipitation days, and sun)

Climate data for Mindelo (1981–2010)
Month	Jan	Feb	Mar	Apr	May	Jun	Jul	Aug	Sep	Oct	Nov	Dec	Year
Record high °C (°F)	29.2 (84.6)	29.5 (85.1)	30.3 (86.5)	29.5 (85.1)	31.5 (88.7)	30.5 (86.9)	33.6 (92.5)	31.8 (89.2)	32.7 (90.9)	31.5 (88.7)	31.0 (87.8)	30.0 (86.0)	33.6 (92.5)
Mean daily maximum °C (°F)	23.4 (74.1)	23.2 (73.8)	23.9 (75.0)	24.0 (75.2)	24.9 (76.8)	25.4 (77.7)	27.1 (80.8)	28.3 (82.9)	28.8 (83.8)	28.0 (82.4)	26.8 (80.2)	25.2 (77.4)	25.7 (78.3)
Daily mean °C (°F)	21.9 (71.4)	21.6 (70.9)	22.0 (71.6)	22.2 (72.0)	22.8 (73.0)	23.8 (74.8)	25.0 (77.0)	26.2 (79.2)	26.5 (79.7)	26.0 (78.8)	25.0 (77.0)	23.3 (73.9)	23.9 (75.0)
Mean daily minimum °C (°F)	19.9 (67.8)	19.7 (67.5)	19.6 (67.3)	20.2 (68.4)	20.9 (69.6)	21.9 (71.4)	22.9 (73.2)	24.1 (75.4)	24.8 (76.6)	24.2 (75.6)	23.2 (73.8)	21.7 (71.1)	21.9 (71.4)
Record low °C (°F)	16.5 (61.7)	13.5 (56.3)	15.6 (60.1)	15.0 (59.0)	15.0 (59.0)	18.0 (64.4)	17.5 (63.5)	14.5 (58.1)	19.0 (66.2)	18.5 (65.3)	19.0 (66.2)	17.0 (62.6)	13.5 (56.3)
Average precipitation mm (inches)	4.8 (0.19)	1.7 (0.07)	0.4 (0.02)	0.4 (0.02)	0.0 (0.0)	0.0 (0.0)	2.6 (0.10)	16.3 (0.64)	36.2 (1.43)	14.5 (0.57)	6.3 (0.25)	1.0 (0.04)	84.2 (3.33)
Average precipitation days (≥ 0.1 mm)	1	1	0	0	0	0	1	4	5	2	2	2	18
Average relative humidity (%)	66.1	67.6	67.2	68.2	70.1	72.9	72.7	74.0	74.2	72.8	69.4	67.3	70.2
Mean monthly sunshine hours	229.4	237.3	275.9	291.0	306.9	276.0	248.0	226.3	225.0	238.7	225.0	201.5	2,981
Mean daily sunshine hours	7.4	8.4	8.9	9.7	9.9	9.2	8.0	7.3	7.5	7.7	7.5	6.5	8.2
Source 1: Instituto Nacional de Meteorologia e Geofísica
Source 2: Deutscher Wetterdienst (extremes, precipitation days, and sun)

== Forests ==
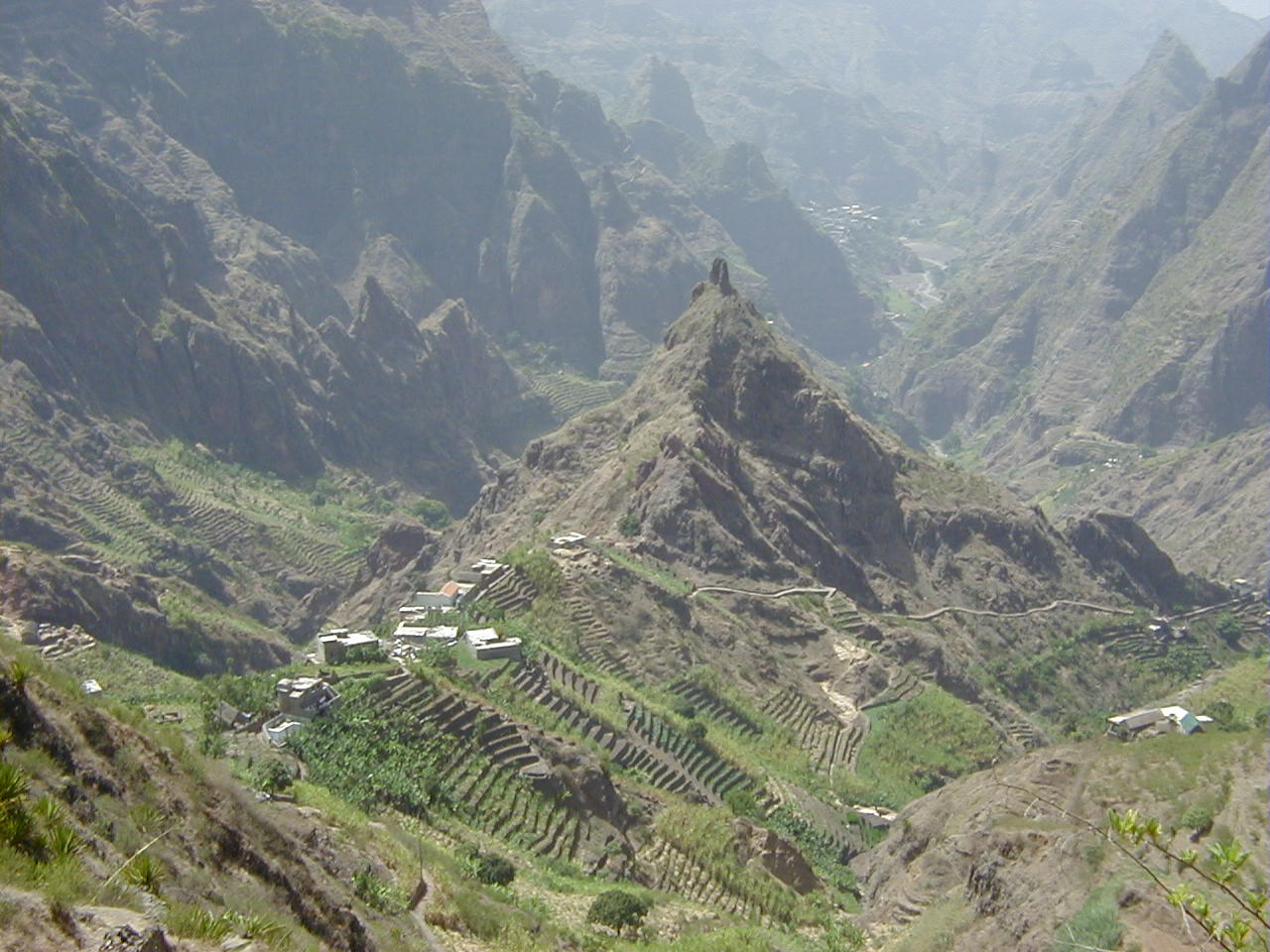
Ribeira Torre on Santo Antão Island, Cape Verde.

In Cabo Verde forest cover is around 11% of the total land area, equivalent to 45,720 hectares (113,000 acres) of forest in 2020, up from 15,380 hectares (38,000 acres) in 1990. In 2020, naturally regenerating forest covered 13,680 hectares (33,800 acres) and planted forest covered 32,040 hectares (79,200 acres). For the year 2015, 100% of the forest area was reported to be under public ownership. The islands constitute the unique Cape Verde Islands dry forests ecoregion, according to the World Wildlife Fund.

== Flora ==
Cape Verde is the driest archipelago of the ecoregion of Macaronesia. That with a greater influence of African species due to its geographical location near the African mainland of the Sahel. At first, the islands of Cabo Verde housed an extensive savanna and dry forest cover, but mostly it was removed to convert to agricultural land, which, together with the arid climate and rugged terrain, has led to a soil erosion and desertification widespread. However, the archipelago can be divided into four broad ecological zones (arid, semiarid, subhumid and humid), according to altitude and average annual rainfall ranging from 200 mm in the arid areas of the coast to more than 1000 mm in the humid mountain. Mostly rainfall precipitation is due to condensation of the ocean mist. Today much of the forest cover comprises relatively immature agroforestry plantations, in which are used non-native species such as Prosopis juliflora, Leucaena leucocephala and Jatropha curcas. The native laurel forest species are in wet area only in mountainous areas.

On the lower and drier islands the vegetation, before human colonization, consisted of savanna or steppe vegetation, with the flattest inland portion supporting semi-desert plants. At higher altitudes, a form of arid shrubland was also present. These islands were covered with savanna on the plains and arid shrubland on the mountainsides, but after over 500 years of human habitation (after Portuguese colonisation) nearly all the original vegetation has been cleared in favour of widespread agriculture including the grazing of goats, sheep and cattle and the planting of imported crop species. There are some remaining patches of dry forest high on steep mountainside including a number of endemic plant species, but these are inaccessible and hard to study.

On the higher islands and somewhat wetter islands, exclusively in mountainous areas, like Santo Antao island, the climate is suitable for the development of dry monsoon forest, and laurel forest as this vegetation is believed to have been present in the past. However, most vegetation has now been converted to agriculture and forest fragments are now restricted to areas where cultivation is not possible, such as mountain peaks and steep slopes. The demand for wood has resulted in deforestation and desertification.

Of particular note is the endemic type of humid subtropical laurel forest of macaronesian laurisilva, found on several of the Macaronesian African mainland enclaves and Macaronesian islands of the North Atlantic, namely Madeira Islands, the Azores, Cape Verde Islands, and the Canary Islands; these are a relic of the Pliocene subtropical forests, supporting numerous endemic species.

This laurisilva forests are found in the islands of Macaronesia in the eastern Atlantic, in particular the Azores, Madeira Islands, and western Canary Islands, from 400 m to 1,200 m elevation. Trees of the genera Apollonias (Lauraceae), Ocotea (Lauraceae), Persea (Lauraceae), Clethra (Clethraceae), Dracaena (Ruscaceae), and Picconia (Oleaceae) are characteristic. The Madeira Islands laurel forest was designated a World Heritage Site by UNESCO in 1999.

== Fauna ==
There are four endemic bird species including the Raso lark along with more common swifts, larks, warblers, and sparrows. The islands are an important breeding site for seabirds including the Cape Verde shearwater and Fea's petrel (Pterodroma feae), which breeds only here and in Madeira. Santiago Island holds the only breeding site of the endemic and critically endangered Bourne's heron. The 11 endemic reptile species include a giant gecko (Tarentola gigas), and there are other geckos and skinks in abundance. The giant skink (Macroscincus coctei) is now thought to be extinct.

== Threats and protection ==
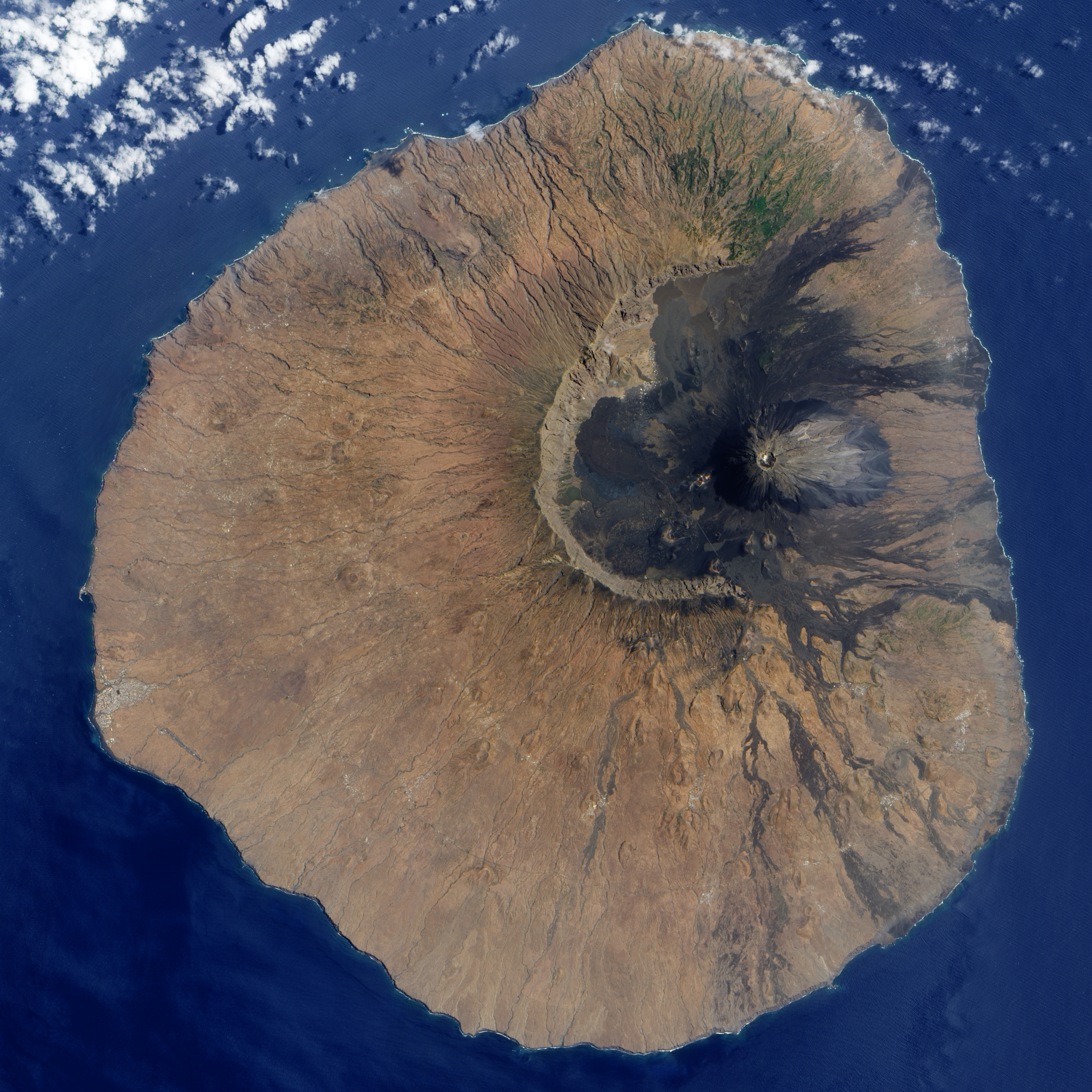
Satellite image of Fogo.

Almost all of the natural environment has been destroyed by conversion to agriculture and logging for firewood, as well as natural soil erosion, all of which has threatened several species of birds and reptiles. The remaining original forest exists at high altitudes only. Newer problems include illegal beach sand extraction and overfishing while the nesting birds are vulnerable due to introduced mammals, including cats and rats.

Environment - international agreements
- Party to: Biodiversity, Climate Change, Climate Change-Kyoto Protocol, Climate Change-Paris Agreement, Comprehensive Nuclear Test Ban, Desertification, Endangered Species, Environmental Modification, Hazardous Wastes, Law of the Sea, Marine Dumping, Nuclear Test Ban, Ozone Layer Protection, Ship Pollution, Wetlands

== Extreme points ==
- Northernmost point - Ponta do Sol on Santao Antão Island
- Southernmost point - Ponta Nho Martinho on Brava
- Westernmost point - Ponta Chao de Mongrade on Santao Antão*
- Easternmost point - Ponta Meringuel on Boa Vista
- *This is also the westernmost point of Africa
