= History of the Jews in Cape Verde =

The Location of Cape Verde

The history of the Jews in Cape Verde deals with the Jews and Jewish communities in Cape Verde.

== Origins ==
Historians agree that the Jewish population of Cape Verde has its roots in the upheavals of the Spanish and Portuguese Inquisitions with the persecutions of Spanish and Portuguese Jews who were often forced to either submit to apostasy or had to flee from their homelands, or both. A second influx of Jews arrived in Cape Verde in the nineteenth and twentieth centuries from Morocco and Gibraltar.

During the early colonial era, Portuguese Cape Verde had a population of so-called lançados (meaning "thrown-out ones") consisting of exiled Crypto-Jews and New Christians.

== Occupations ==
Jews were allowed to engage in trade craftsmanship as long as they did not compete with the Portuguese trading monopolies.

== Present ==
A U.S.-based organization called the Cape Verde Jewish Heritage Project has been set up to restore the islands' Jewish cemeteries and create an archive about the Jewish ancestry of Cape Verde. According to its president, Carol Castiel, its "goal is to honor the memory and explore the contributions of the many Sephardic Jewish families who immigrated to Cape Verde from Morocco and Gibraltar in the mid-19th century."

The project was the subject of articles from The Forward ("Honoring Cape Verde’s Jewish History") and Washington Jewish Week ("Preserving a Jewish niche: Group seeks to honor the ghosts of Cape Verde"), as well as the Jewish Telegraphic Agency ("Cape Verdean municipalities advance Jewish preservation"), about agreements to maintain Jewish cemeteries on Ribeira Grande (Santo Antao), Praia and Boa Vista, as well as meetings with notables for this cause, such as at the Cape Verdean American Business Association in 2010.

== See also ==
- History of the Jews in Africa

=== Regions: ===
- History of the Jews in Central Africa
- History of the Jews in East Africa
- History of the Jews in North Africa
- History of the Jews in Southern Africa
- History of the Jews in West Africa

=== Topics: ===
- Luso-Africans
