= Cape Verde–European Union relations =

- European Union: Cape Verde

Cape Verde is an island nation, part of the Macaronesian group of islands of the Atlantic Ocean and was a Portuguese colony during the colonial era between 1460 and 1975. EU-Cape Verde relations are founded on the EU/Cape Verde Special Partnership, agreed in 2007, building on six pillars:

- Good governance
- Security/stability
- Regional integration
- Technical and Regulatory Convergence
- Knowledge-based Society
- The fight against poverty, and development.

Following that, an Action Plan for Security and Stability was launched in 2014 and a Mobility Partnership.

Cape Verde is a member of the Economic Community of West African States (ECOWAS), an African regional bloc, which aims for internal integration similar to that of the EU. Even though it does not yet participate in all of ECOWAS' activities, Cape Verde cannot have membership in both organizations at the same time. It is also a member of the African Union, an organization aiming for a common currency in Africa, a single defense force for the African continent and an African Union head of state.

In 2016, the Cape Verde government declared its intention to present ECOWAS with proposals for "special status" instead of full membership.

Cape Verde is also one of the beneficiaries of the EU's regional cooperation programme with Portuguese-speaking African countries (PALOP): Angola, Cabo Verde, Guinea-Bissau, Mozambique, and São Tomé and Príncipe.

== Membership ==
In March 2005, former Portuguese president Mário Soares launched a petition urging the European Union to start membership talks with Cape Verde, saying the country could act as a bridge between Africa, Latin America, and the EU.

Cape Verde's per capita GDP is lower than those of the current member states and candidate countries. Freedom House in 2021 gave Cape Verde the maximum score for all aspects of Political Pluralism and Participation and Civil Liberties. Most of the imports and exports of Cape Verde are for and from the European Union, and it has a service-based economy. Its currency, the escudo, is pegged to the euro.

Although the Cape Verde archipelago is geographically part of Africa, there have been similar situations before. Cyprus is an island nation that, despite being geographically in Asia, has already joined both the Council of Europe and the EU. Furthermore, the Cape Verde islands are part of the same archipelago as the Canary Islands (part of Spain), Madeira (part of Portugal) and Azores (part of Portugal), known as Macaronesia. There is currently no political recognition by the EU of Cape Verde as a European state. However, unlike in the case of Morocco, there is no formal rejection either.

Complementing Cape Verde's efforts to join the EU, the Macaronesian group of islands (the Azores, Madeira, and the Canary Islands) have stated their support. The Atlantic group of islands are pushing for an entrance of Cape Verde into the EU under a special status.

== See also ==
- Macaronesia
- Special member state territories and the European Union
