= Cape Verde =

Island country in West Africa

Republic of Cabo Verde República de Cabo Verde (Portuguese)
- Flag Emblem
- Motto: Unidade, Trabalho, Progresso (Portuguese); (English: "Unity, Work, Progress")
- Anthem: Cântico da Liberdade (Portuguese) (English: "Chant of Freedom")
- Capital and largest city: Praia; 14°54′59″N 23°30′34″W
- Official languages: Portuguese
- Recognized national languages: Cape Verdean Creole
- Religion (2021): 81.7% Christianity; 72.5% Catholic Church; 3.6% Protestantism; 6.8% other Christian; 15.6% no religion; 2.5% others
- Demonym: Cape Verdean or Cabo Verdean
- Government: Unitary semi-presidential republic
  - President: José Maria Neves
  - Prime Minister: Francisco Carvalho
- Legislature: National Assembly

Independence from Portugal
  - Granted: 5 July 1975

Area
  - Total: 4,033 km^{2} (1,557 sq mi) (166th)
  - Water (%): negligible

Population
  - 2021 census: ▲491,233 (172nd)
  - Density: 130/km^{2} (336.7/sq mi) (89th)
- GDP (PPP): 2023 estimate
  - Total: ▲$5.717 billion (170th)
  - Per capita: ▲$9,909 (125th)
- GDP (nominal): 2023 estimate
  - Total: ▲$2.598 billion (181st)
  - Per capita: ▲$4,502 (117th)
- Gini (2015): ▼42.4 medium inequality
- HDI (2023): ▲0.668 medium (135th)
- Currency: Cape Verdean escudo (CVE)
- Time zone: UTC−01:00 (CVT)
- Date format: dd/mm/yyyy
- Calling code: +238
- ISO 3166 code: CV
- Internet TLD: .cv

Cape Verde, (Note: /vɜːrd/ VURD; Portuguese: Cabo Verde [ˈkabu ˈveɾdɨ]; Cape Verdean Creole: Kabu Verdi [ˈkabu ˈveɾdi]) also referred to in English by its Portuguese name Cabo Verde, and known officially as the Republic of Cabo Verde, (Note: Portuguese: República de Cabo Verde) is an archipelagic country in the eastern Atlantic Ocean, off the coast of West Africa. It consists of ten volcanic islands with a combined land area of about 4,033 square kilometres (1,557 sq mi). These islands lie between 600 and 850 kilometres (370 and 530 miles) west of Cap-Vert (i.e., Dakar), the westernmost point of continental Africa, after which they are named. Cape Verde forms part of the Macaronesia ecoregion, along with the Azores, the Canary Islands, Madeira and the Savage Islands.

The archipelago was uninhabited until the 15th century, when Portuguese explorers settled the islands, establishing one of the first European settlements in the tropics. Its strategic position gave it a significant role in the transatlantic slave trade during the 16th and 17th centuries; the islands saw rapid economic growth driven by the trade of manufactured goods, rum, cloth for African slaves, ivory, and gold. By the mid 19th century, increased foreign competition, persistent drought, and the decline of the slave trade led to economic decline and emigration; Cape Verde gradually recovered as an important commercial centre and stopping point for major shipping routes.

Cape Verde became independent in 1975. Since the early 1990s, it has been a stable representative democracy and has remained one of the most developed and democratic countries in Africa. Lacking natural resources, its developing economy is mostly service-oriented, with a growing focus on tourism and foreign investment. With a population of around 530,000 (as of 2026), Cape Verde is among the least populous countries in Africa. The Cape Verdean people trace their ancestry primarily to West African populations, with additional contributions from early Portuguese settlers and other groups who came to the islands. A sizeable diaspora exists across the world, especially in the United States and Portugal, considerably outnumbering the inhabitants on the islands. Cape Verde is a member state of the African Union.

The official language is Portuguese, while the recognized national language is Cape Verdean Creole (Crioulo), which is spoken by the vast majority of the population. As of the 2021 census, the most populous islands were Santiago (269,370) – which hosts the country's capital and largest city, Praia; São Vicente (74,016); Santo Antão (36,632); Fogo (33,519); and Sal (33,347). The largest cities are Praia (137,868), Mindelo (69,013), Espargos (24,500) and Assomada (21,297).

== Etymology ==
The country is named after the Cap-Vert peninsula on the Senegalese coast. The name Cap-Vert, in turn, comes from the Portuguese language Cabo Verde ('green cape'), the name given to it by Portuguese explorers in 1444, a few years before they came across the islands. Historically, the name has been anglicised as Cape Verde. In 2013, the country's delegation informed the United Nations that only Cabo Verde (Portuguese pronunciation: [ˈkabu ˈveɾdɨ]) and not other translations should be used for official purposes.

== History ==
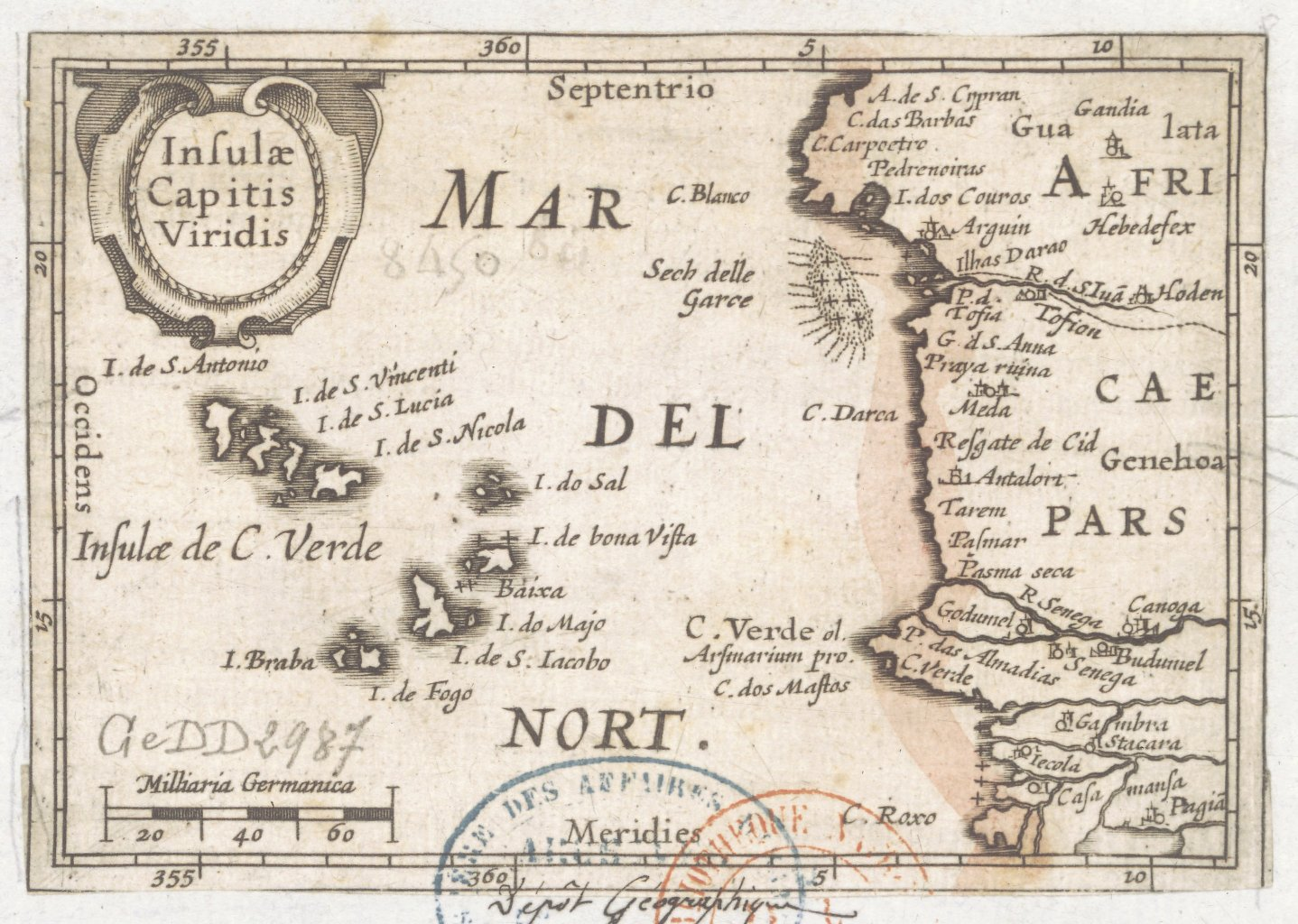
Insulæ Capitis Viridis (1598), showing Cape Verde

The archipelago was formed approximately 40–50 million years ago during the Eocene epoch. Before the arrival of Europeans, the Cape Verde Islands were uninhabited. They were discovered by Genoese and Portuguese navigators around 1456. According to Portuguese official records, the first discoveries were made by Genoa-born António de Noli, who was afterwards appointed governor of Cape Verde by Portuguese King Afonso V. Other navigators mentioned as contributing to discoveries on the Cape Verde archipelago are Diogo Dias, Diogo Afonso, Alvise Cadamosto and Diogo Gomes (who had accompanied António de Noli on his voyage of discovery, and who claimed to have been the first to land on Santiago and the first to name that island).

In 1462, Portuguese settlers arrived at Santiago and founded a settlement they called Ribeira Grande. Today it is called Cidade Velha ("Old City"), to distinguish it from Ribeira Grande. The original Ribeira Grande was the first permanent European settlement in the tropics.

In the 16th century, the archipelago prospered from the Atlantic slave trade. Pirates occasionally attacked the Portuguese settlements. Francis Drake, an English privateer, twice sacked Ribeira Grande in 1585 when it was a part of the Iberian Union. After a French attack in 1712, the town declined in importance relative to nearby Praia, which became the capital in 1770.

The decline in the slave trade in the 19th century resulted in an economic crisis. Cape Verde's early prosperity slowly evaporated. Still, the islands' position astride mid-Atlantic shipping lanes made Cape Verde an ideal location for re-supplying ships. Because of its excellent harbour Mindelo, located on the island of São Vicente, the country became an important commercial centre. Diplomat Edmund Roberts visited Cape Verde in 1832. Cape Verde was the first stop on Charles Darwin's voyage with HMS Beagle in 1832.

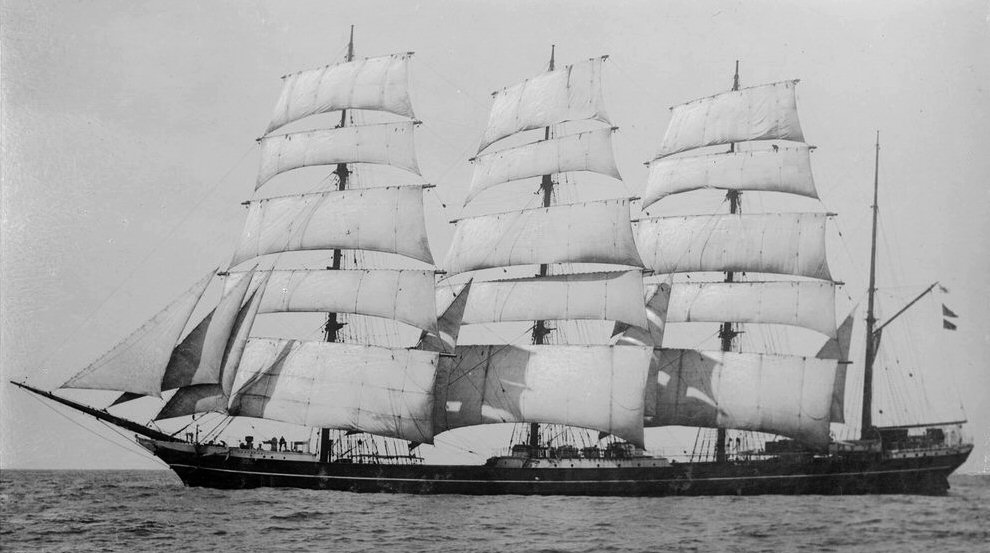
The Scottish-built grain-ship Garthpool, wrecked at Boa Vista, in 1928

With few natural resources and inadequate sustainable investment from the Portuguese, citizens grew increasingly dissatisfied with their colonial masters, who refused to provide the local authorities with more autonomy. In 1951, Portugal changed Cape Verde's status from a colony to an overseas province in an attempt to blunt growing nationalism.

In 1956, Amílcar Cabral and a group of fellow Cape Verdeans and Guineans organized (in Portuguese Guinea) the clandestine African Party for the Independence of Guinea and Cape Verde (PAIGC). It demanded improvement in economic, social, and political conditions in Cape Verde and Portuguese Guinea and formed the basis of the two nations' independence movement. Its objective was to achieve independence through nonviolent protest. However, in 1959, the Portuguese authorities reacted with repression, marked by violence and mass arrests, persuading the PAIGC that armed struggle was the only viable means to overthrow the colonial regime. Moving its headquarters to Conakry, Guinea, in 1960, the PAIGC began an armed rebellion against Portugal in 1961. Acts of sabotage eventually grew into a war in Portuguese Guinea that pitted 10,000 PAIGC soldiers against 35,000 Portuguese and African troops.

By 1972, the PAIGC controlled much of Portuguese Guinea despite the presence of the Portuguese troops, but the organization did not attempt to disrupt Portuguese control in Cape Verde. Portuguese Guinea declared independence in 1973 and was granted de jure independence in 1974. A budding independence movement originally led by Amílcar Cabral, who was assassinated in 1973, passed on to his half-brother Luís Cabral and culminated in independence for the archipelago in 1975.

Following the April 1974 revolution in Portugal, the PAIGC became an active political movement in Cape Verde. In December 1974, the PAIGC and Portugal signed an agreement providing for a transitional government composed of Portuguese and Cape Verdeans. On 30 June 1975, Cape Verdeans elected a National Assembly which received instruments of independence from Portugal on 5 July 1975.

On 2 February 2024, Cape Verde became the third African country to be free of malaria.

== Government and politics ==
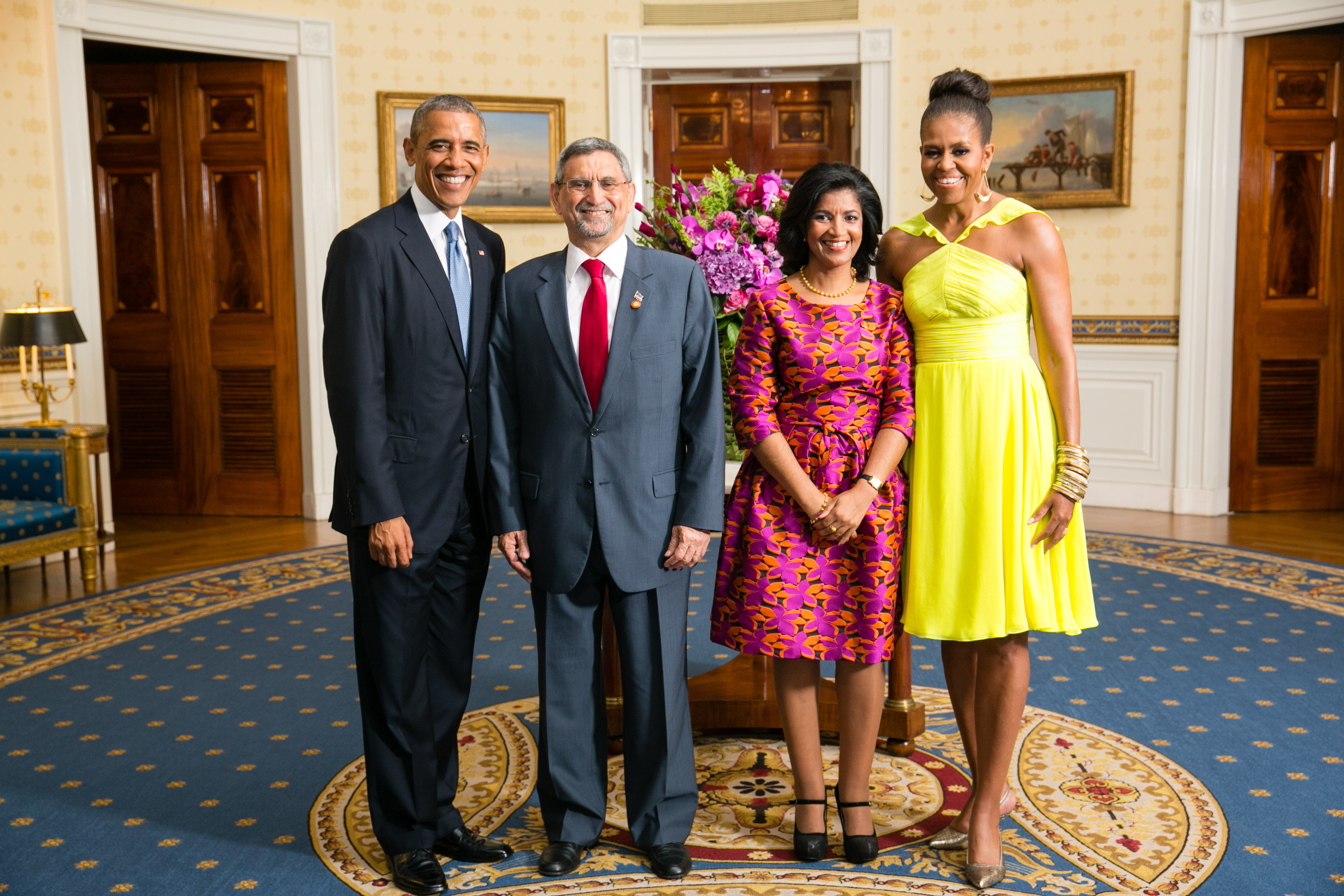
Cape Verdean President Jorge Carlos Fonseca and Lígia Fonseca meet with US President Barack Obama and Michelle Obama at the White House in 2014.

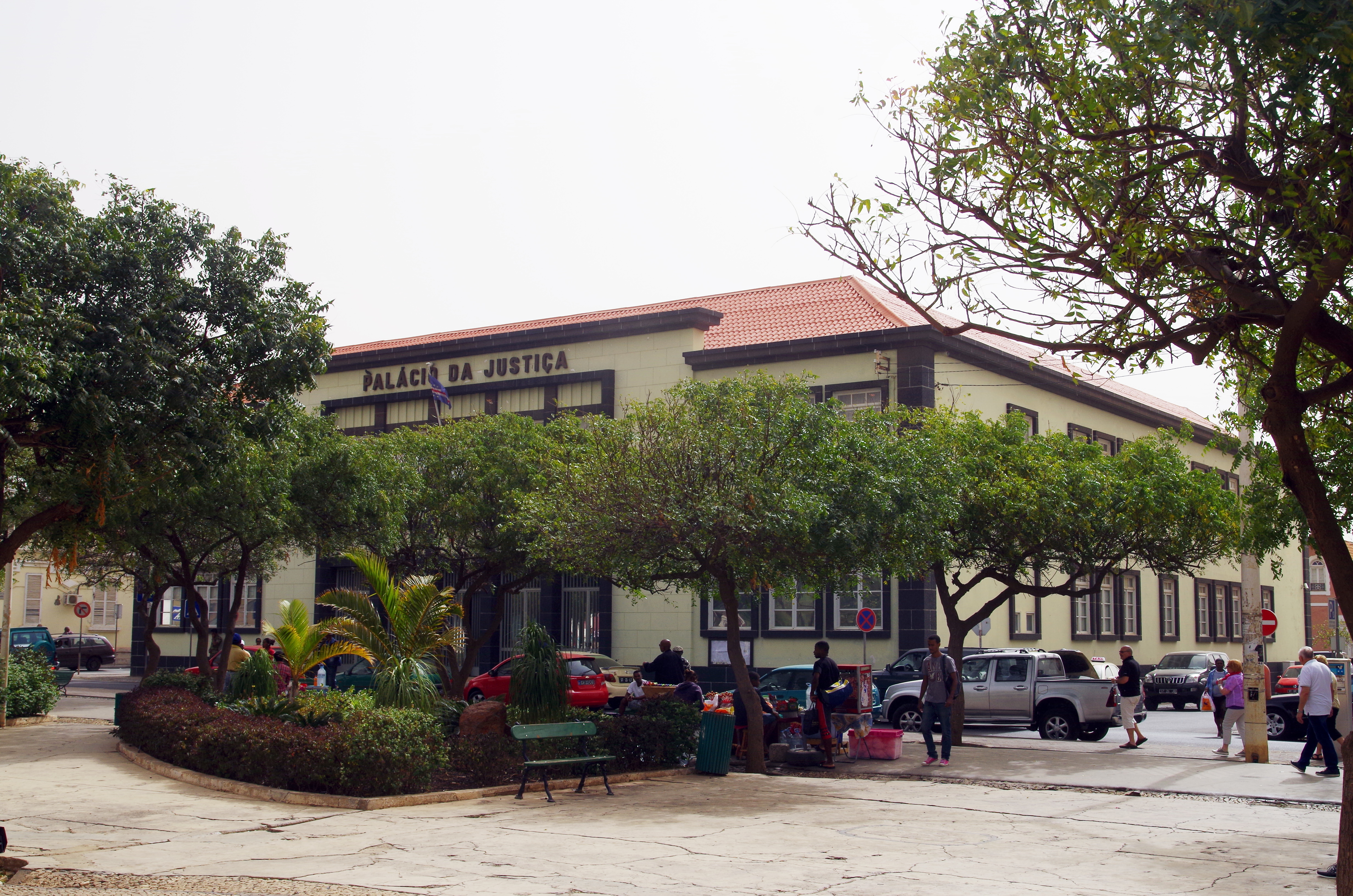
Palácio da Justiça – Palace of Justice, in Praia

=== Government ===
Cape Verde is a unitary semi-presidential representative democratic republic. In 2026, it was a joint second most democratic nation in Africa (alongside Mauritius and South Africa), ranking 40th in the world, according to the electoral democracy score of the V-Dem Democracy indices.

The constitution – adopted in 1980 and revised in 1992, 1995 and 1999 – defines the basic principles of its government. The president is the head of state and is elected by popular vote for a five-year term. The prime minister is the head of government and proposes other ministers and secretaries of state. The prime minister is nominated by the National Assembly and appointed by the president. Members of the National Assembly are elected by popular vote for five-year terms. In 2016, three parties held seats in the National Assembly – MpD (36), PAICV (25), and the Cape Verdean Independent Democratic Union (UCID) (3). The two main political parties are PAICV and MpD.

The judicial system consists of a Supreme Court of Justice – whose members are appointed by the president, the National Assembly, and the Board of the Judiciary – and regional courts. Separate courts hear civil, constitutional, and criminal cases. Appeals are to the Supreme Court.

=== International recognition ===
In 2013, United States President Barack Obama said that Cape Verde was "a real success story." Among other achievements, it has been recognized with the following assessments:

Index	Score	PALOP rank	CPLP rank	African rank	World rank	Year
Human Development Index	0.654	1 (top 17%)	3 (top 38%)	10 (top 19%)^{[A]}	125 (top 62%)	2017
Ibrahim Index of African Governance	71.1	1 (top 17%)	—N/a	3 (top 6%)	—N/a	2018
Freedom of the Press	27 (Free)	1 (top 17%)	2 (top 25%)	1 (top 2%)	48 (top 24%)	2014
Freedom in the World	1/1^{[B]}	1 (top 17%)	1 (top 13%)^{[C]}	1 (top 2%)^{[D]}	1 (top 1%)^{[E]}	2016
Press Freedom Index	18.02	1 (top 17%)	2 (top 25%)	3 (top 6%)	27 (top 14%)	2017
Democracy Index	7.88 (Flawed democracy)	1 (top 17%)	1 (top 13%)	2 (top 4%)	26 (top 13%)	2018
Corruption Perceptions Index	62	1 (top 17%)	2 (top 25%)	2 (top 4%)	35 (top 18%)	2024
e-Government Readiness Index	0.62	1 (top 17%)	3 (top 38%)	7 (top 13%)	111 (top 55%)	2024
Fragile States Index	57.2	1 (top 17%)	2 (top 25%)	4 (top 8%)	61 (top 30%)^{[F]}	2024
Networked Readiness Index	3.8	1 (top 17%)	3 (top 38%)	7 (top 13%)	87 (top 43%)	2015

- ^{A} See List of countries by Human Development Index § Africa
- ^{B} 1/1 is the highest possible rating.
- ^{C} With the maximum score, Cape Verde shares first place with Portugal.
- ^{D} Cape Verde was the only African country to reach the maximum rating.
- ^{E} With the maximum score, Cape Verde shares first place with 48 other countries.
- ^{F} The rank on this list is expressed in reverse order. To be comparable with the other rankings on this table, the actual rank of 116 was inverted, by subtracting it from the number of countries on the list, currently 177.

=== Foreign relations ===
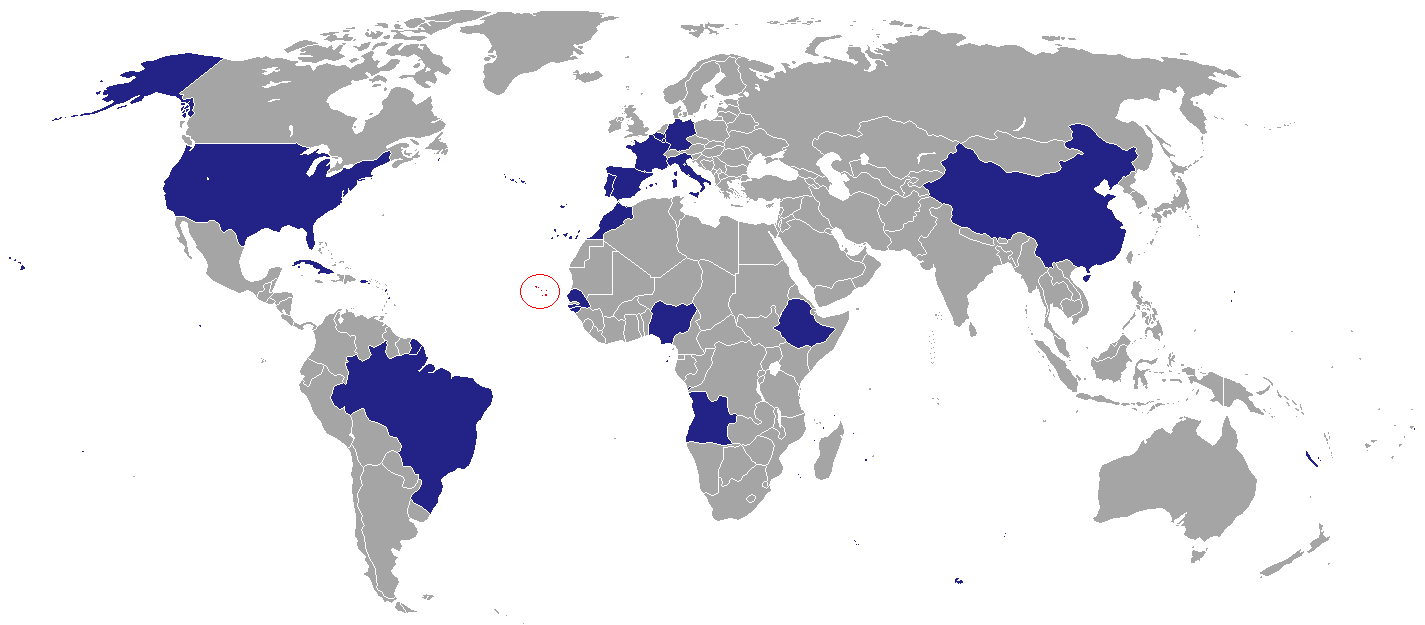
Map of countries with Cape Verdean embassies

Cape Verde follows a policy of nonalignment and seeks cooperative relations with all friendly states. Angola, Brazil, China, Libya, Cuba, France, Guinea-Bissau, Germany, Italy, Portugal, Spain, São Tomé and Príncipe, Senegal, Russia, Luxembourg, and the United States maintain embassies in Praia. Cape Verde maintains a vigorously active foreign policy especially in Africa.

Cape Verde is a founding member state of the Community of Portuguese Language Countries, also known as the Lusophone Commonwealth, an international organization and political association of Lusophone nations across four continents, where Portuguese is an official language. Cape Verde has bilateral relations with some Lusophone nations and holds membership in a number of international organizations. It also participates in most international conferences on economic and political issues. Since 2007, Cape Verde has a special partnership status with the EU, under the Cotonou Agreement, and might apply for special membership, in particular because the Cape Verdean escudo, the country's currency, is indexed to the euro. In 2011 Cape Verde ratified the Rome Statute of the International Criminal Court. In 2017 Cape Verde signed the UN treaty on the Prohibition of Nuclear Weapons.

In November 2021, Cape Verde opened its first embassy in Nigeria.

=== Military ===
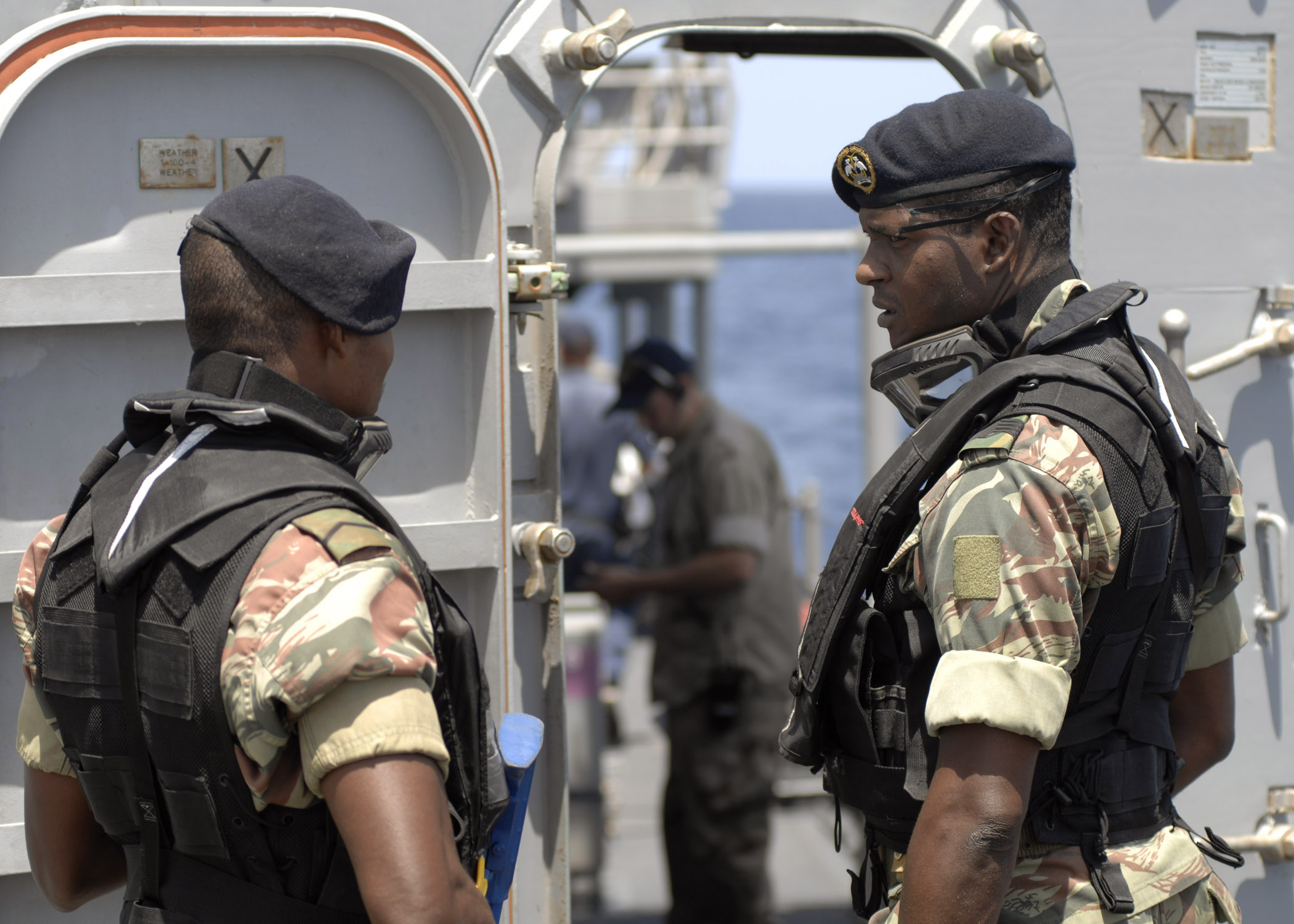
Marines of the Cape Verdean Coast Guard

The military of Cape Verde consists of the National Guard and the Coast Guard; 0.7% of the country's GDP was spent on the military in 2005. Having fought their only battles in the war for independence against Portugal between 1974 and 1975, the efforts of the Cape Verdean armed forces have turned to combatting international drug trafficking. In 2007, together with the Cape Verdean Police, they carried out Operation Flying Launch (Operacão Lancha Voadora), a successful operation to put an end to a drug trafficking group which smuggled cocaine from Colombia to the Netherlands and Germany using the country as a reorder point. The operation took more than three years, being a secret operation during the first two years, and ended in 2010. In 2016, Cape Verdean Armed Forces were involved in the Monte Tchota massacre, a green-on-green incident that resulted in 11 deaths.

== Geography ==
A topographic map of Cape Verde

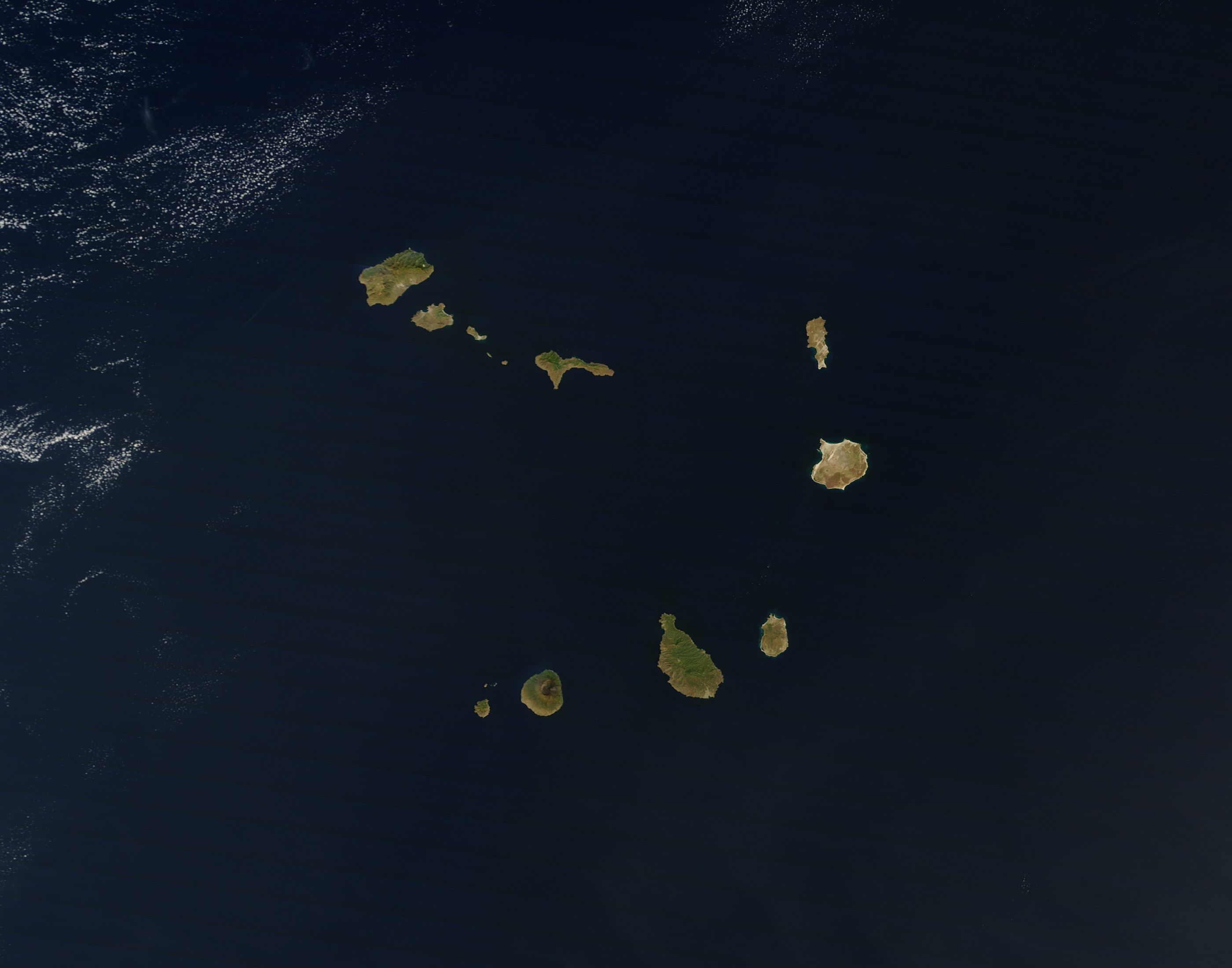
A satellite photo of the Cape Verde islands, 2010

The Cape Verde archipelago is in the Atlantic Ocean, approximately 570 kilometres (350 mi) off the western coast of the African continent, near Senegal, The Gambia, and Mauritania as well as part of the Macaronesia ecoregion. It lies between latitudes 14° and 18°N, and longitudes 22° and 26°W. The country is a horseshoe-shaped cluster of ten islands (nine inhabited) and eight islets, that constitute an area of 4033 km^{2} (1557 sq mi).

The islands are spatially divided into two groups:

- The Barlavento Islands (windward islands): Santo Antão, São Vicente, Santa Luzia, São Nicolau, Sal, Boa Vista; and
- The Sotavento Islands (leeward): Maio, Santiago, Fogo, Brava.

The largest island, both in size and population, is Santiago, which hosts the nation's capital, Praia, the principal urban agglomeration in the archipelago. Sal, Boa Vista, and Maio, are fairly flat, sandy, and dry; the other islands are generally rockier with more vegetation.

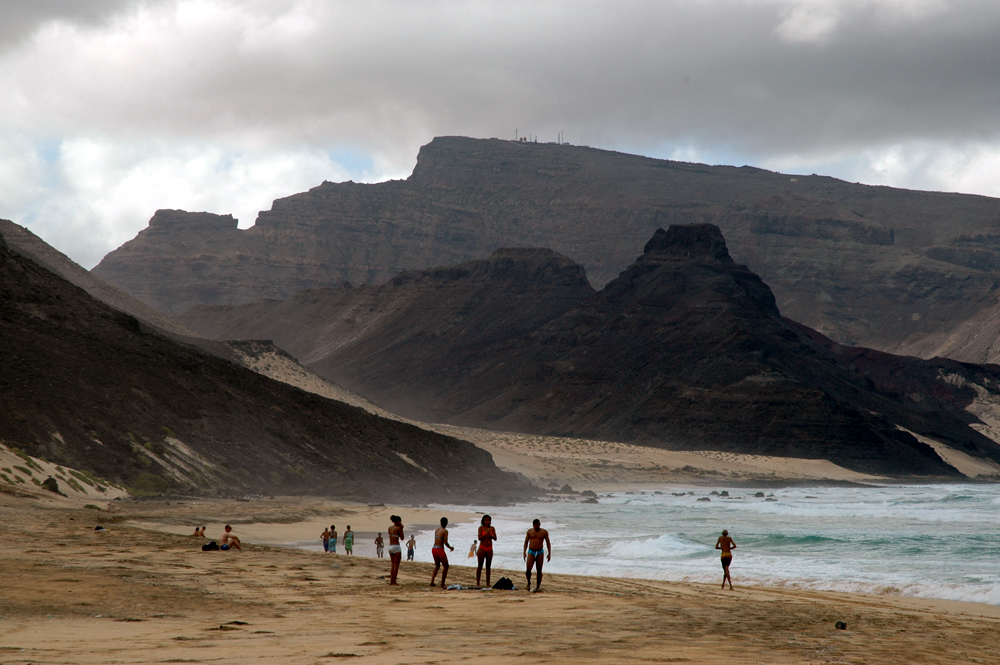
The beach of Calhau, with Monte Verde in the background, on São Vicente

=== Physical geography and geology ===
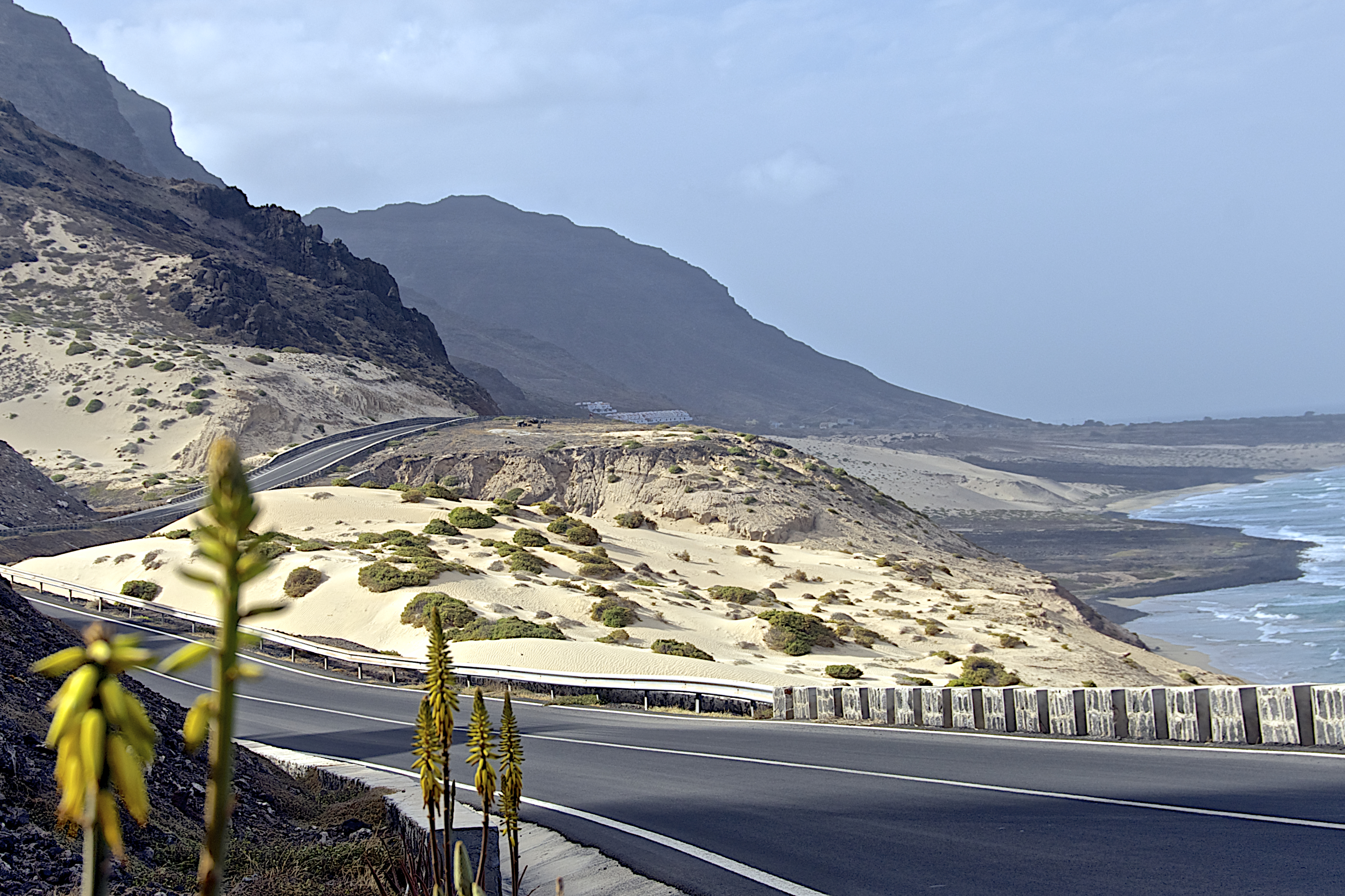
The countryside in Estrada Baía das Gatas

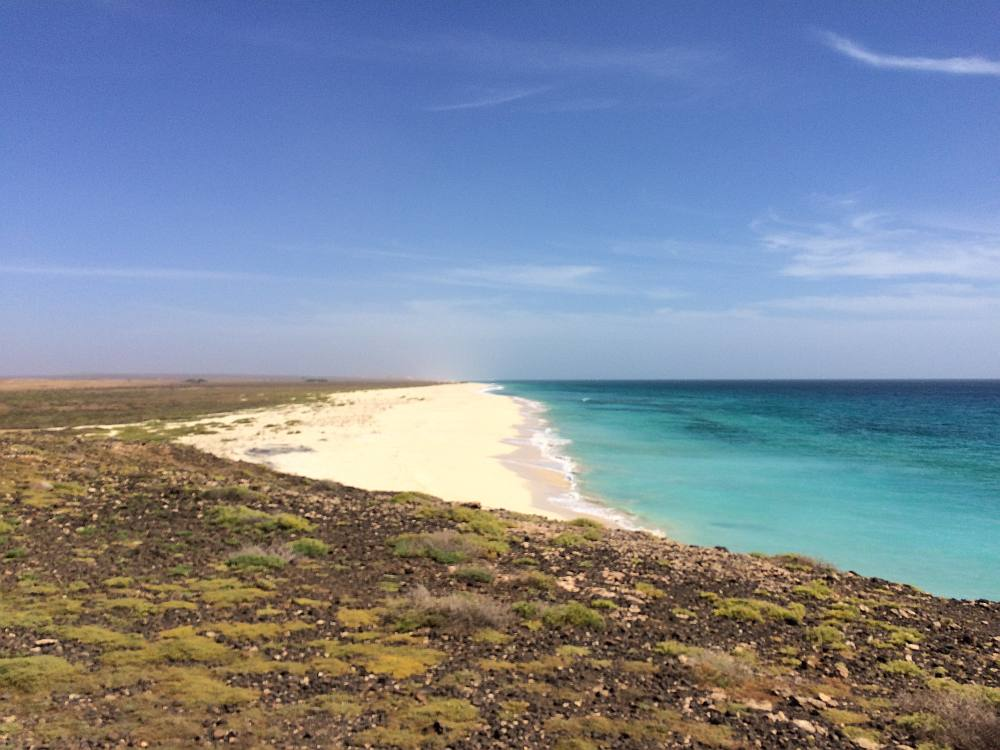
Beach east of Curral Velho, Boa Vista

Geologically, the islands are principally composed of igneous rocks, with volcanic structures and pyroclastic debris comprising the majority of the archipelago's total volume. The volcanic and plutonic rocks are distinctly basic; the archipelago is a soda-alkaline petrographic province, with a petrologic succession similar to that found in other Macaronesian islands. The islands lie on a bathymetric swell known as the Cape Verde Rise. The rise is one of the largest protuberances in the world's oceans, rising 2.2 kilometres (1.4 miles) in a semi-circular region of 1200 km^{2} (460 sq mi), associated with a rise of the geoid.

Magnetic anomalies identified in the vicinity of the archipelago indicate that the structures forming the islands date back 125–150 million years: the islands date from 8 million (in the west) to 20 million years (in the east). The oldest exposed rocks occurred on Maio and the northern peninsula of Santiago and are 128–131 million-year-old pillow lavas. The first stage of volcanism in the islands began in the early Miocene and reached its peak at the end of this period when the islands reached their maximum sizes.

Historical volcanism (within human settlement) has been restricted to Fogo. Pico do Fogo, the largest active volcano in the region, erupted in 2014. It has an eight-kilometre-diameter (five-mile) caldera, the rim of which is at an elevation of 1,600 metres (5,249 feet) and an interior cone that rises to 2,829 metres (9,281 feet) above sea level. The caldera resulted from subsidence, following the partial evacuation (eruption) of the magma chamber, along a cylindrical column from within the magma chamber (at a depth of 8 kilometres (5 miles)).

Extensive salt flats are found on Sal and Maio. On Santiago, Santo Antão, and São Nicolau, arid slopes give way in places to sugarcane fields or banana plantations spread along the base of towering mountains. Ocean cliffs have been formed by catastrophic debris landslides.

=== Climate ===
Cape Verde's climate is milder than that of the African mainland because the surrounding sea moderates temperatures, and cold Atlantic currents produce an arid atmosphere. Conversely, the islands do not receive the upwelling (cold streams) that affect the West African coast, so the air temperature is cooler than in Senegal, but the sea is warmer. Because of the relief of some islands, such as Santiago with its steep mountains, the islands can have orographically induced precipitation, allowing rich woods and luxuriant vegetation to grow where the humid air condenses, soaking the plants, rocks, soil, logs, moss, etc. On the higher islands and somewhat wetter islands, the climate is suitable for the development of dry monsoon forests and laurel forests. Cape Verde lies in the Cape Verde Islands dry forests ecoregion. Average temperatures range from 22 °C (72 °F) in February to 27 °C (80.6 °F) in September. Cape Verde is part of the Sahelian semi-arid belt, with nothing like the rainfall levels of nearby West Africa. It rains irregularly between August and October, with frequent brief heavy downpours. A desert is usually defined as terrain that receives less than 250 mm (9.8 in) of annual rainfall. Sal's total of 145 mm (5.7 in) confirms this classification. Most of the year's rain falls in September.

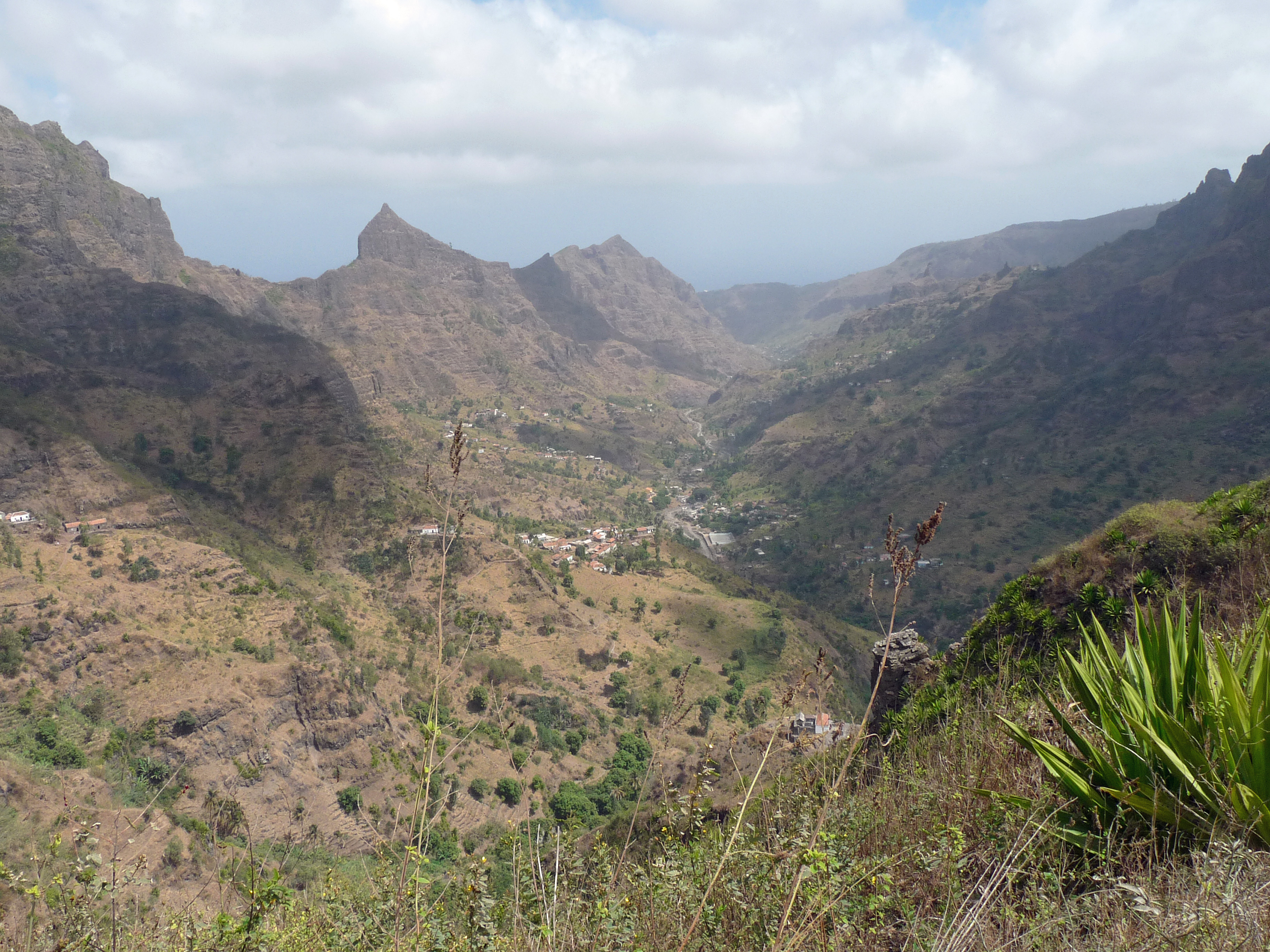
The small valley (or dale) of Principal, Santiago

Because of the infrequent occurrence of rainfall where not mountainous, the landscape is so arid that less than two percent of it is arable. The archipelago can be divided into four broad ecological zones – arid, semiarid, sub-humid and humid, according to altitude and average annual rainfall ranging from less than 100 millimetres (3.9 inches) in the arid areas of the coast as in the Deserto de Viana (67 millimetres (2.6 inches) in Sal Rei) to more than 1,000 millimetres (39 inches) in the humid mountain. Most rainfall precipitation is due to condensation of the ocean mist. In some islands, like Santiago, the wetter climate of the interior and the eastern coast contrasts with the drier one on the south/southwest coast.

Western Hemisphere-bound hurricanes often have their early beginnings near the Cape Verde Islands. These Cape Verde hurricanes can become very intense as they cross warm Atlantic waters. The average hurricane season has about two Cape Verde-type hurricanes, which are usually the largest and most intense storms of the season because they often have plenty of warm open ocean over which to develop before encountering land. The five largest Atlantic tropical cyclones on record have been Cape Verde-type hurricanes. Most of the longest-lived tropical cyclones in the Atlantic basin are Cape Verde hurricanes.

Since 1851 the islands have been twice struck by hurricanes: in 1892 and in 2015 (Hurricane Fred, the easternmost hurricane ever to form in the Atlantic).

Climate data for Cape Verde: São Vicente, Sal and Santiago, 1981–2010 normals, 1931–1960 extremes
Month	Jan	Feb	Mar	Apr	May	Jun	Jul	Aug	Sep	Oct	Nov	Dec	Year
Record high °C (°F)	32.0 (89.6)	33.1 (91.6)	34.2 (93.6)	33.4 (92.1)	33.3 (91.9)	34.1 (93.4)	33.6 (92.5)	38.0 (100.4)	34.8 (94.6)	33.0 (91.4)	33.0 (91.4)	31.0 (87.8)	38.0 (100.4)
Mean daily maximum °C (°F)	24.9 (76.8)	25.1 (77.2)	25.8 (78.4)	25.9 (78.6)	26.6 (79.9)	27.3 (81.1)	28.2 (82.8)	29.4 (84.9)	29.9 (85.8)	29.5 (85.1)	28.2 (82.8)	26.3 (79.3)	27.3 (81.1)
Daily mean °C (°F)	22.1 (71.8)	21.9 (71.4)	22.4 (72.3)	22.7 (72.9)	23.4 (74.1)	24.3 (75.7)	25.3 (77.5)	26.5 (79.7)	26.9 (80.4)	26.4 (79.5)	25.2 (77.4)	23.4 (74.1)	24.2 (75.6)
Mean daily minimum °C (°F)	19.4 (66.9)	19.1 (66.4)	19.3 (66.7)	19.8 (67.6)	20.6 (69.1)	21.6 (70.9)	22.7 (72.9)	23.9 (75.0)	24.5 (76.1)	23.8 (74.8)	22.6 (72.7)	20.9 (69.6)	21.5 (70.7)
Record low °C (°F)	12.0 (53.6)	10.0 (50.0)	12.0 (53.6)	15.0 (59.0)	15.0 (59.0)	15.0 (59.0)	17.0 (62.6)	14.5 (58.1)	19.0 (66.2)	18.5 (65.3)	17.0 (62.6)	16.0 (60.8)	10.0 (50.0)
Average precipitation mm (inches)	4.9 (0.19)	1.5 (0.06)	0.7 (0.03)	0.4 (0.02)	0.3 (0.01)	0.0 (0.0)	3.9 (0.15)	30.2 (1.19)	41.7 (1.64)	18.8 (0.74)	3.7 (0.15)	3.1 (0.12)	109.2 (4.3)
Average relative humidity (%)	66.9	67.3	66.9	67.8	69.5	72.3	73.8	75.3	76.0	73.5	70.7	69.5	70.8
Mean monthly sunshine hours	213.4	184.9	197.1	199.0	195.4	175.1	165.4	160.7	165.1	185.3	186.2	202.9	2,230.5
Source 1: Instituto Nacional de Meteorologia e Geofísica
Source 2: Deutscher Wetterdienst (extremes)

According to the president of Nauru, in 2011, Cape Verde was ranked the eighth most endangered nation due to flooding from climate change. In 2023, UN Secretary-General António Guterres arrived in Cabo Verde to raise concerns about climate change. He said that the country is on the frontlines of the existential crisis generated by climate disruptions and that world leaders need to take action to address the climate crisis. Cabo Verde is a leader in renewable energy in sub-Saharan Africa. As of 2023, 20% of its energy comes from renewable sources, and the goal is to increase that to 50% by 2030. In 2023, Portugal signed an agreement to forgive €140 million of Cape Verde's debt in exchange for the country investing in environmental projects. This agreement is one of the first debt-for-nature swaps in Africa.

=== Biodiversity ===
Cape Verde's isolation has resulted in the islands having several endemic species, particularly birds and reptiles, many of which are endangered by human development. Endemic birds include Alexander's swift (Apus alexandri), Bourne's heron (Ardea purpurea bournei), the Raso lark (Alauda razae), the Cape Verde warbler (Acrocephalus brevipennis), and the Iago sparrow (Passer iagoensis). The islands are also an important breeding area for seabirds including the Cape Verde shearwater. Reptiles include the Cape Verde giant gecko (Tarentola gigas).

Forest cover is around 11% of the total land area, equivalent to 45,720 hectares (ha) of forest in 2020, up from 15,380 ha in 1990. In 2020, naturally regenerating forest covered 13,680 ha and planted forest covered 32,040 ha. For the year 2015, 100% of the forest area was reported to be under public ownership.

=== Administrative divisions ===
Cape Verde is divided into 22 municipalities (concelhos) and subdivided into 32 parishes (freguesias), based on the religious parishes that existed during the colonial period:

Barlavento Islands
Island	Municipality	Census 2010	Census 2021	Parish
Santo Antão	Ribeira Grande	18,890	15,022	Nossa Senhora do Rosário
Santo Antão	Ribeira Grande	18,890	15,022	Nossa Senhora do Livramento
Santo Antão	Ribeira Grande	18,890	15,022	Santo Crucifixo
Santo Antão	Ribeira Grande	18,890	15,022	São Pedro Apóstolo
Santo Antão	Paúl	6,997	5,696	Santo António das Pombas
Santo Antão	Porto Novo	18,028	15,014	São João Baptista
Santo Antão	Porto Novo	18,028	15,014	Santo André
São Vicente	São Vicente	76,107	74,016	Nossa Senhora da Luz
Santa Luzia	São Vicente	76,107	74,016	Nossa Senhora da Luz
São Nicolau	Ribeira Brava	7,580	6,978	Nossa Senhora da Lapa
São Nicolau	Ribeira Brava	7,580	6,978	Nossa Senhora do Rosário
São Nicolau	Tarrafal de São Nicolau	5,237	5,261	São Francisco
Sal	Sal	25,765	33,347	Nossa Senhora das Dores
Boa Vista	Boa Vista	9,162	12,613	Santa Isabel
Boa Vista	Boa Vista	9,162	12,613	São João Baptista

Sotavento Islands
Island	Municipality	Census 2010	Census 2021	Parish
Maio	Maio	6,952	6,298	Nossa Senhora da Luz
Santiago	Praia	131,602	142,009	Nossa Senhora da Graça
Santiago	São Domingos	13,808	13,958	Nossa Senhora da Luz
Santiago	São Domingos	13,808	13,958	São Nicolau Tolentino
Santiago	Santa Catarina	43,297	37,472	Santa Catarina
Santiago	São Salvador do Mundo	8,677	7,452	São Salvador do Mundo
Santiago	Santa Cruz	26,609	25,004	Santiago Maior
Santiago	São Lourenço dos Órgãos	7,388	6,317	São Lourenço dos Órgãos
Santiago	Ribeira Grande de Santiago	8,325	7,632	Santíssimo Nome de Jesus
Santiago	Ribeira Grande de Santiago	8,325	7,632	São João Baptista
Santiago	São Miguel	15,648	12,906	São Miguel Arcanjo
Santiago	Tarrafal	18,565	16,620	Santo Amaro Abade
Fogo	São Filipe	22,228	20,732	São Lourenço
Fogo	São Filipe	22,228	20,732	Nossa Senhora da Conceição
Fogo	Santa Catarina do Fogo	5,299	4,725	Santa Catarina do Fogo
Fogo	Mosteiros	9,524	8,062	Nossa Senhora da Ajuda
Brava	Brava	5,995	5,594	São João Baptista
Brava	Brava	5,995	5,594	Nossa Senhora do Monte

== Economy ==
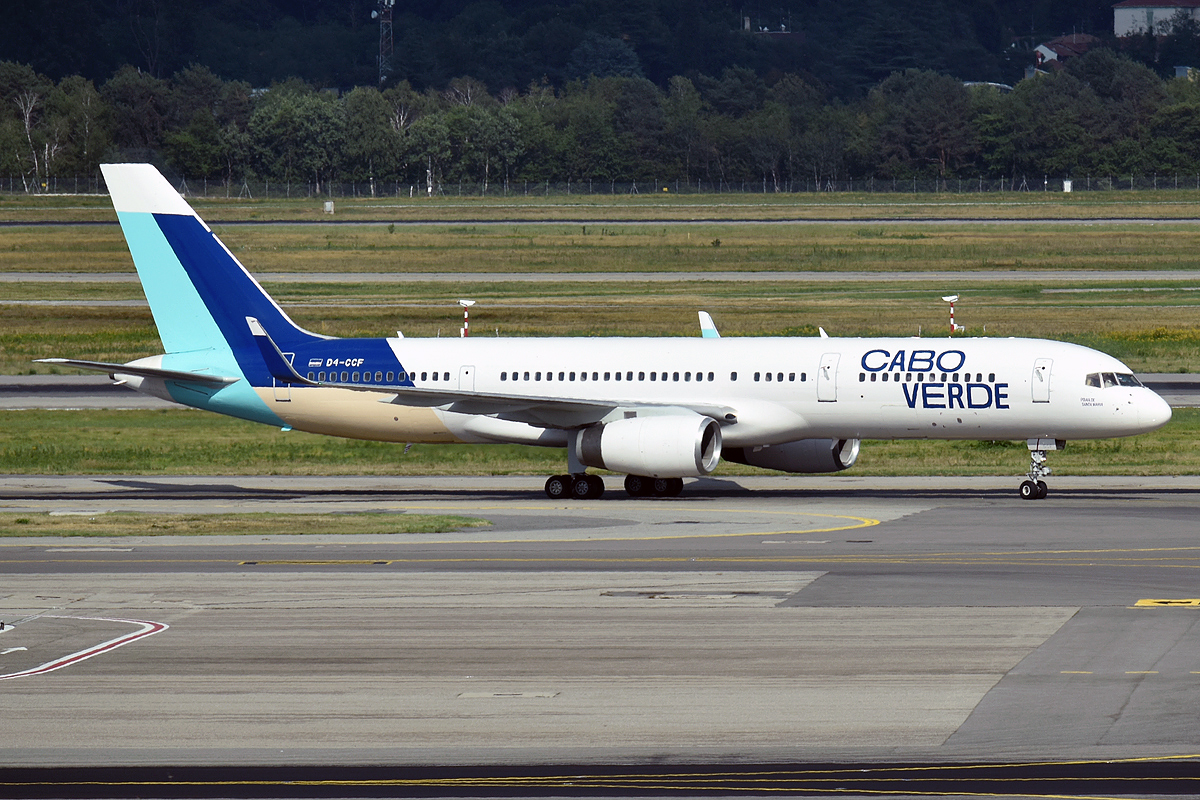
Cape Verdean national flag carrier Cabo Verde Airlines, formerly known as TACV

Cape Verde's notable economic growth and improvement in living conditions despite a lack of natural resources have garnered international recognition, with other countries and international organisations often providing development aid. Since 2007, the UN has classified it as a developing nation rather than a least developed country.

Cape Verde has few natural resources. Only five of the ten main islands (Santiago, Santo Antão, São Nicolau, Fogo, and Brava) normally support significant agricultural production, and over 90% of all food consumed is imported. Mineral resources include salt, pozzolana (a volcanic rock used in cement production), and limestone. Its small number of wineries making Portuguese-style wines have traditionally focused on the domestic market, but have recently met with some international acclaim.

The economy is service-oriented, with commerce, transport, and public services accounting for more than 70% of the GDP. Although nearly 35% of the population lives in rural areas, agriculture and fishing contribute only about 9% of GDP. Light manufacturing accounts for most of the remainder. Fish and shellfish are plentiful, and small quantities are exported. Cape Verde has cold storage and freezing facilities and fish processing plants in Mindelo, Praia, and on Sal. Expatriate Cape Verdeans contribute an amount estimated at 20% of GDP to the domestic economy through remittances. Despite having few natural resources and being semi-desert, the country has the highest living standards in the region and has attracted thousands of immigrants of different nationalities.

Since 1991, the government has pursued market-oriented economic policies, including an open welcome to foreign investors and a far-reaching privatization programme. It established as top development priorities the promotion of a market economy and the private sector; the development of tourism, light manufacturing industries, and fisheries; and the development of transport, communications, and energy facilities. From 1994 to 2000 about $407 million in foreign investments were made or planned, of which 58% were in tourism, 17% in industry, 4% in infrastructure, and 21% in fisheries and services.

In 2011, a wind farm was built on four islands that supplies about 30% of the electricity of the country. As host to the ECOWAS Regional Centre for Renewable Energy and Energy Efficiency, inaugurated in 2010, Cape Verde had planned to lead by example by becoming entirely reliant on renewable energy sources by 2025. This policy was consistent with the host of documents adopted in 2015 paving the way to more sustainable development, including Cape Verde's Transformational Agenda to 2030, its National Renewable Energy Plan and its Low Carbon and Climate-resilient Development Strategy. Two years later, these were followed by a Strategic Plan for Sustainable Development, 2017–2021. Since then, Cape Verde has pushed back this goal, aiming for 50% of energy produced by renewable sources by 2030 and 100% by 2050.

Between 2000 and 2009, real GDP increased on average by over 7% a year, well above the average for sub-Saharan countries and faster than most small island economies in the region. Strong economic performance was bolstered by one of the fastest-growing tourism industries in the world, as well as by substantial capital inflows that allowed Cape Verde to build up national currency reserves to the current 3.5 months of imports. Unemployment has been falling rapidly, and the country is on track to achieve most of the UN Millennium Development Goals – including halving its 1990 poverty level. In 2007, Cape Verde joined the World Trade Organization (WTO) and in 2008 the country graduated from Least Developed Country (LDC) to Middle Income Country (MIC) status.

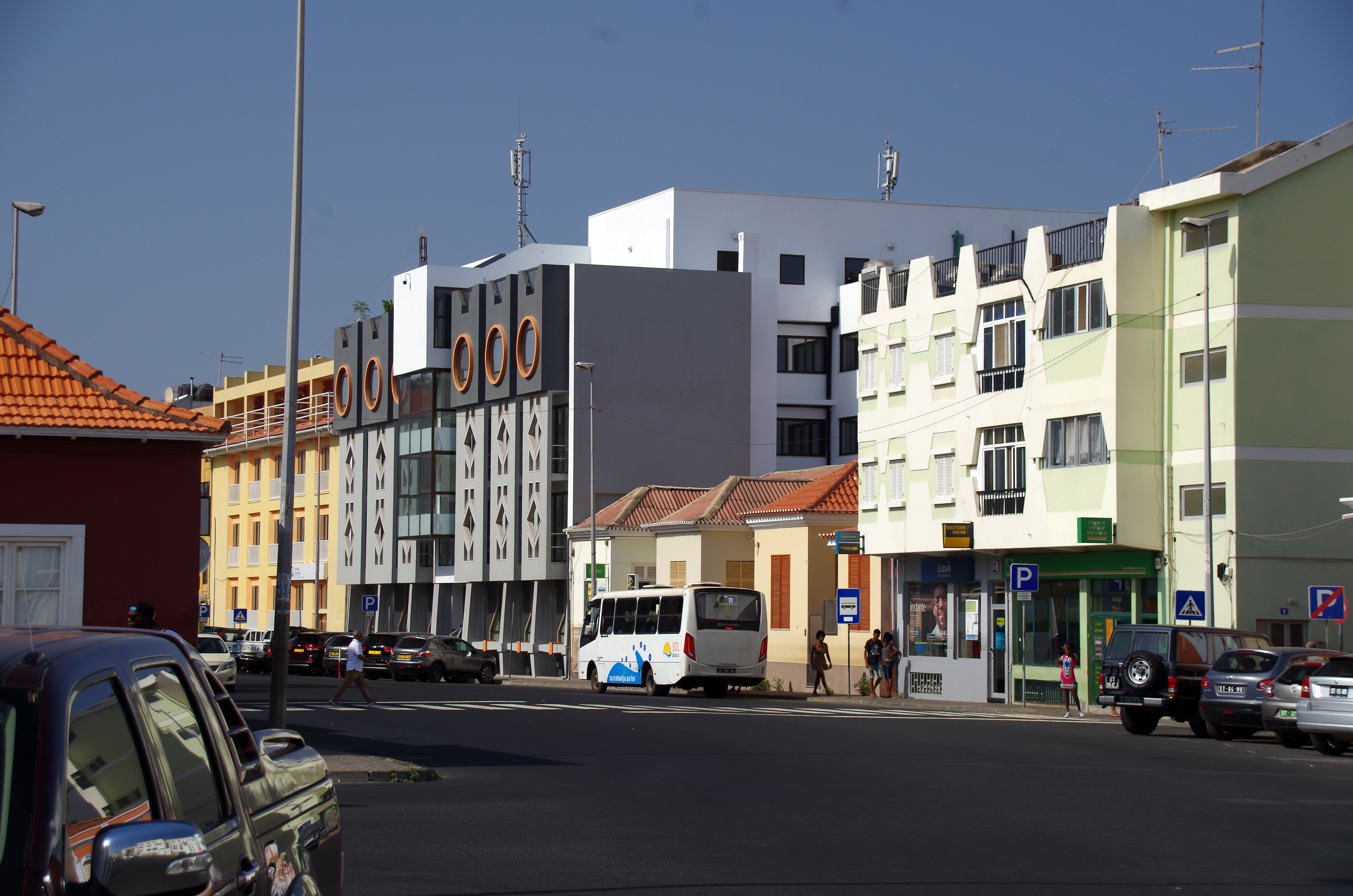
Cabral Avenue, one of the main symbols of Cape Verde's development

Cape Verde has significant cooperation with Portugal at every level of the economy, which has led it to link its currency first to the Portuguese escudo and, in 1999, to the euro. On 23 June 2008 Cape Verde became the 153rd member of the WTO. In early January 2018, the government announced that the minimum wage would be raised to 13,000 CVE (€118) per month, from 11,000 CVE, which was effective in mid-January 2018.

The European Commission's total allocation for the period of 2008–2013 foreseen for Cape Verde to address "poverty reduction, in particular in rural and peri-urban areas where women are heading the households, as well as good governance" amounts to €54.1 million.

=== Tourism ===
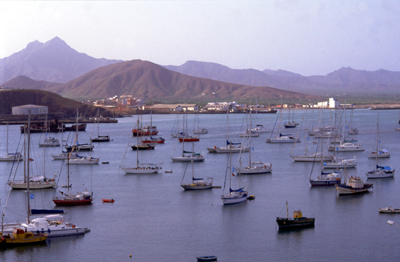
Yachts in Porto Grande, Mindelo, on the island of São Vicente. Tourism is a growing source of income on the islands.

Cape Verde's strategic location at the crossroads of mid-Atlantic air and sea lanes has been enhanced by significant improvements at Mindelo's harbour (Porto Grande) and at Sal's and Praia's international airports. Aristides Pereira International Airport was opened in 2007, and Cesária Évora Airport was opened in 2009. Ship repair facilities at Mindelo were opened in 1983.

The major ports are Mindelo and Praia, but all other islands have smaller port facilities. In addition to the international airport on Sal, airports have been built on all of the inhabited islands. All but the airports on Brava and Santo Antão enjoy scheduled air service. The archipelago has 3,050 km (1,895 mi) of roads, of which 1,010 km (628 mi) are paved, most using cobblestone.

== Demographics ==
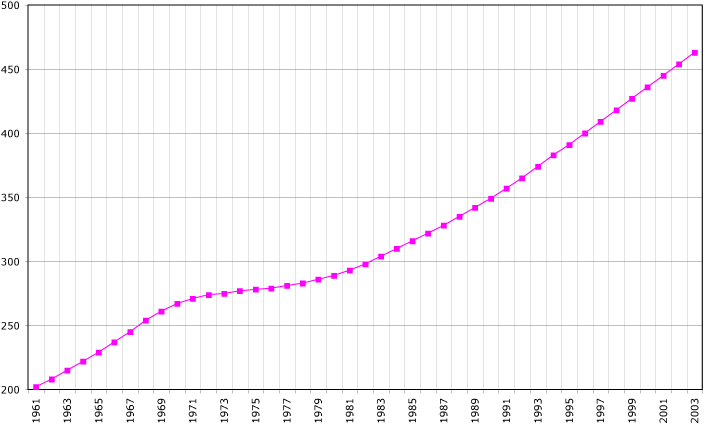
Cape Verde's population, 1961–2003

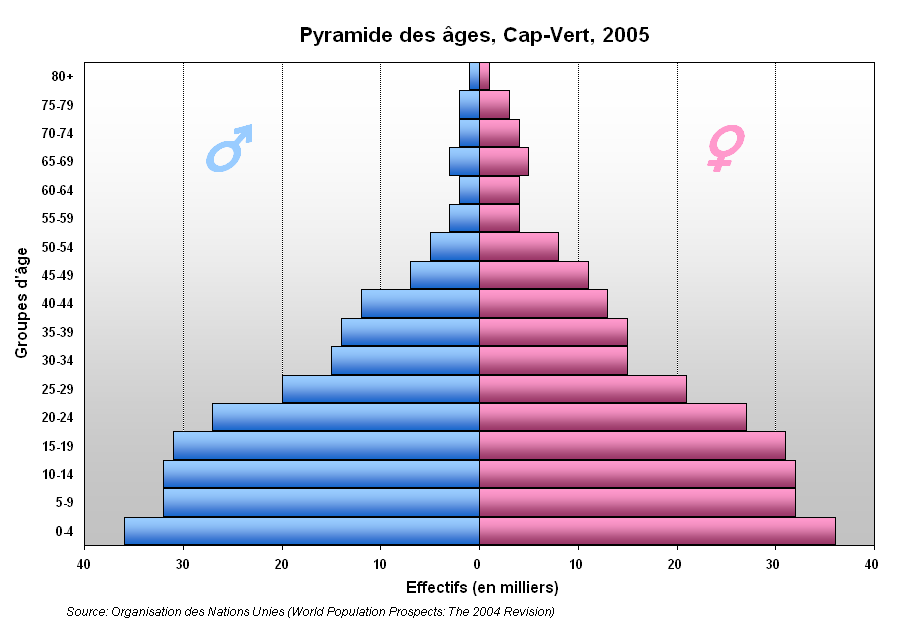
Cape Verde's population pyramid, 2005

Cape Verde had a population of 491,233 in 2021. A large proportion (236,000) of Cape Verdeans live on Santiago. Cape Verdeans are descendants of Africans (free or enslaved) and Europeans of various origins. There are also Cape Verdeans who have Jewish ancestors from North Africa, mainly on Boa Vista, Santiago, and Santo Antão. The history of the Jews in Cape Verde dates back to the expulsion from Portugal.

The country's historical trajectory included, from the beginning, a process of social class formation. At this moment, the absence of a "bourgeoisie" can be seen, but the existence of several types of "petty bourgeoisie" is numerically significant. The majority of the population is, however, made up of the peasantry and some working class.

Largest cities or towns in Cape Verde Instituto Nacional de Estatística (Distribuição da população residente – RGPH 2010: População urbana)
Rank	Name	Municipality	Pop.
1	Praia	Praia	127,832
2	Mindelo	São Vicente	70,468
3	Santa Maria	Sal	23,839
4	Assomada	Santa Catarina	12,026
5	Porto Novo	Porto Novo	9,430
6	Pedra Badejo	Santa Cruz	9,345
7	São Filipe	São Filipe	8,125
8	Tarrafal	Tarrafal	6,177
9	Sal Rei	Boa Vista	5,407
10	Ribeira Grande	Ribeira Grande	4,625

=== Languages ===
The official language is Portuguese. It is the language of instruction and government. It is also used in newspapers, television, and radio. Cape Verdean Creole (Kriolu) is used colloquially and is the mother tongue of virtually all Cape Verdeans. The national constitution calls for measures to give it parity with Portuguese. There is a substantial body of literature in Creole, especially in the Santiago Creole and the São Vicente Creole. Kriolu has been gaining prestige since the nation's independence from Portugal.

The differences between the forms of the language within the islands have been a major obstacle to the standardization of the language. Some people have advocated the development of two standards: a north (Barlavento) standard, centred on the São Vicente Creole, and a south (Sotavento) standard, centred on the Santiago Creole. Manuel Veiga, a linguist and minister of culture of Cape Verde, is the premier proponent of Kriolu's officialization and standardization.

=== Religion ===
Religion in Cape Verde (2010)
1. Catholic Church (78.7%)
2. Other Christian (10.4%)
3. Other or non-religious (10.9%)

The vast majority of Cape Verdeans are Christian; reflecting centuries of Portuguese rule, Roman Catholics make up the single largest religious community, at just under 80 percent, as of 2010 (slightly down from 85 percent of the population in 2007). The country is divided into two Roman Catholic dioceses: the Diocese of Mindelo and the Diocese of Santiago de Cabo Verde. Most other religious groups are Protestant, with the evangelical Church of the Nazarene forming the second largest community; other sizeable denominations are the Seventh-day Adventist Church, the Assemblies of God, the Universal Church of the Kingdom of God and the Church of Jesus Christ of Latter-day Saints. Islam is the largest minority religion. Judaism had a historical presence during the colonial era. Atheists constitute less than 1 percent of the population. Many Cape Verdeans syncretize Christianity with indigenous African beliefs and customs.

=== Emigration and immigration ===
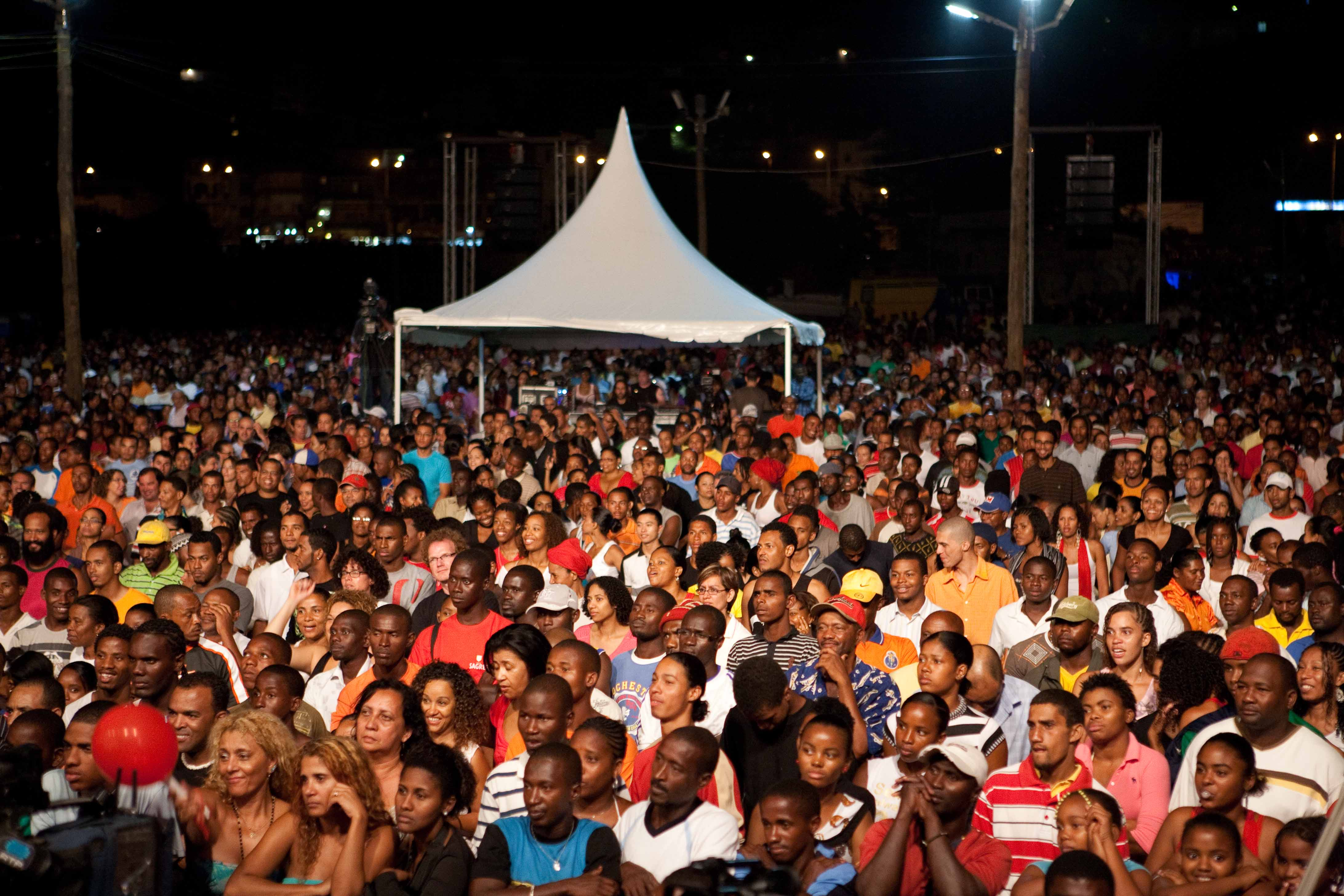
People in Santiago, the largest island in the country

Almost twice as many Cape Verdeans live abroad (nearly one million) as in the country itself. The islands have a long history of emigration, and Cape Verdeans are widely dispersed worldwide, from Macau to Haiti and Argentina to Sweden. The diaspora may be much larger than official statistics indicate, as, until independence in 1975, Cape Verdean immigrants had Portuguese passports. The majority live in the United States and Western Europe, with the former hosting the largest overseas population at 500,000. Most in the U.S. are concentrated in New England, particularly Boston, New Bedford, and Providence; Brockton, Massachusetts, has the largest community of any American city (18,832).

Cape Verdeans have been migrating to Massachusetts since the 1840s, but most of the current population arrived in the 1970s. They are now one of the top ten immigrant groups in Boston and the largest African national group. The first wave of immigrants came to Massachusetts to work in the whaling industry. When whaling declined, they moved into maritime jobs, seasonal agricultural work (like picking cranberries), and factory work. The second wave of immigrants arrived after Cape Verde gained independence in 1975. They also found work in factories, but as manufacturing plants closed down, they moved into the service industry in the 1990s. Immigrants have developed a vibrant small business sector, including restaurants, groceries, real estate and insurance offices, and other enterprises. Immigrants in the U.S. have a long history of service in the U.S. military, with a presence in every major conflict from the Revolutionary War to the Vietnam War.

Due to centuries of colonial ties, the second largest number of Cape Verdeans live in Portugal (150,000), with sizeable communities in the former Portuguese colonies of Angola (45,000) and São Tomé and Príncipe (25,000). Major populations exist in countries with cultural and linguistic similarities, such as Spain (65,500), France (25,000), Senegal (25,000), and Italy (20,000). Other countries with large communities include the United Kingdom (35,500), the Netherlands (20,000, of which 15,000 are concentrated in Rotterdam), and Luxembourg and Scandinavia (7,000). Outside the U.S. and Europe, the biggest Cape Verdean populations are in Mexico (5,000) and Argentina (8,000).

Over the years, Cape Verde has increasingly become a net recipient of migrants due to its relatively high per capita income, political and social stability, and civil liberties. Migrants from China make up a sizeable and important segment of the foreign population, while nearby West African countries account for the largest percentage of the immigrant population. In the 21st century, a few thousand people from Europe and the Americas have settled in the country, mostly professionals, entrepreneurs, and retirees. Over 22,000 foreign-born residents are naturalized, hailing from over 90 countries.

=== Health ===
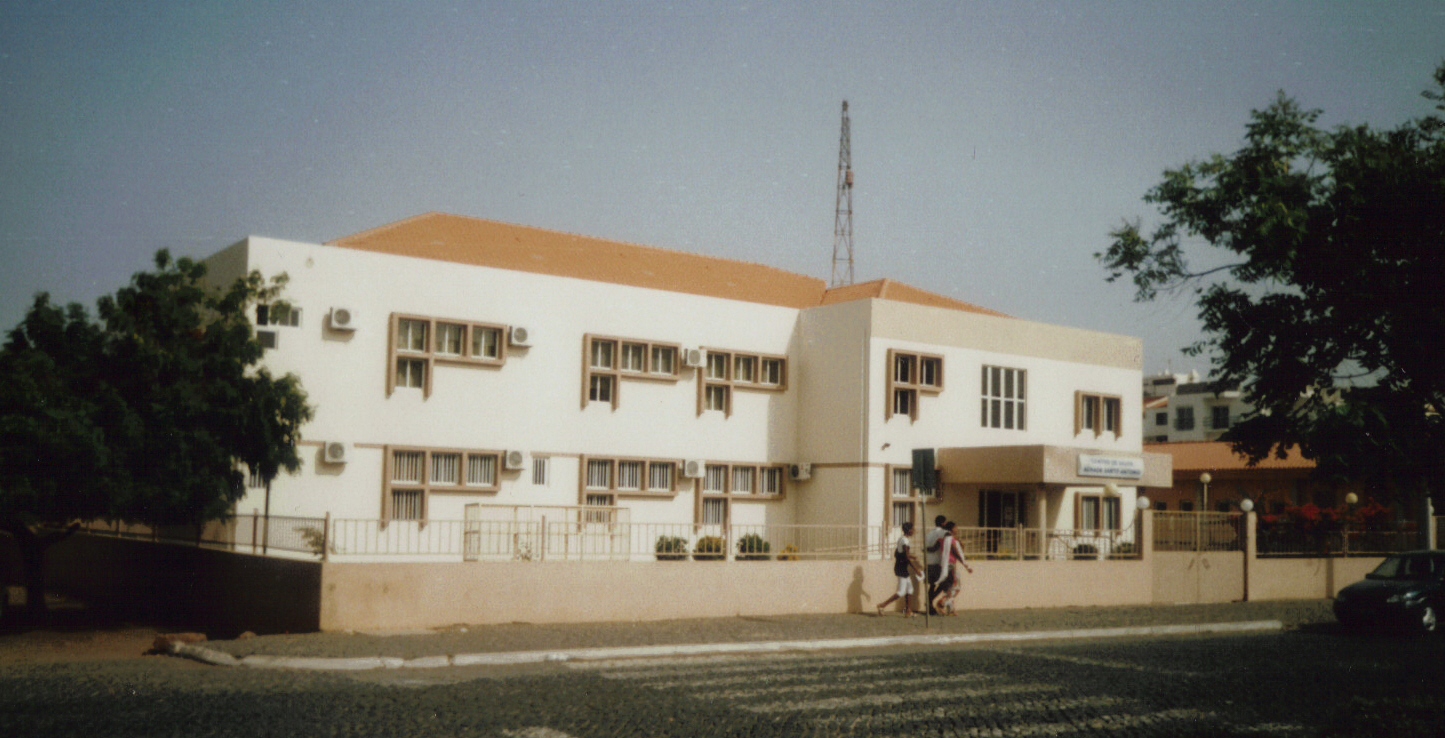
A health clinic in a residential area of Praia

The infant mortality rate among children between 0 and 5 years old is 15 per 1,000 live births according to the latest (2017) data from the National Statistics Bureau, while the maternal mortality rate is 42 deaths per 100,000 live births. The HIV-AIDS prevalence rate among Cape Verdeans between 15 and 49 years old is 0.8%.

According to the latest data (2017) from the National Statistics Bureau, life expectancy at birth is 76.2 years; that is, 72.2 years for males and 80.2 years for females. There are six hospitals: two central hospitals (Praia and Mindelo) and four regional hospitals (in Santa Catarina, São Antão, Fogo, and Sal). In addition, there are 28 health centres, 35 sanitation centres, and a variety of private clinics.

The population is among the healthiest in Africa. Since its independence, it has greatly improved its health indicators. Besides having been promoted to the group of "medium development" countries in 2007, leaving the least developed countries category (becoming the second country to do so), as of 2020 it was the 11th best ranked country in Africa in its Human Development Index. The total expenditure on health was 7.1% of GDP (2015). Cabo Verde ranks 48th out of 127 countries with sufficient data, with a GHI score of 9.2, indicating low hunger.

=== Education ===
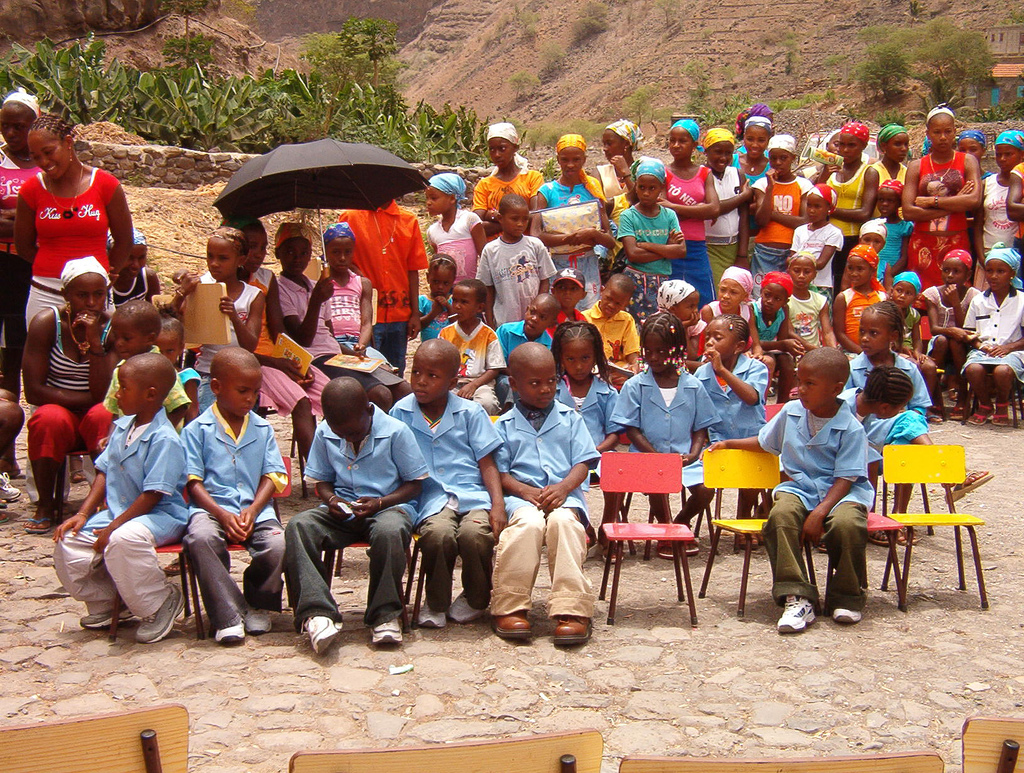
A kindergarten graduation on Santiago Island

Cape Verde has one of the best educational systems in Africa, ranked 8th by the World Education Forum in 2023. Although the educational system is similar to the Portuguese system, over the years the local universities have been increasingly adopting the American educational system; for instance, all ten existing universities offer four-year bachelor's degree programmes as opposed to five-year bachelor's degree programmes that existed before 2010. Primary school education is mandatory and free for children between ages 6–14.

In 2011, the net enrolment ratio for primary school was 85%. Approximately 91% of the total population over 15 years of age is literate, and roughly 25% of the population holds a college degree; a significant number of these college graduates hold doctorate degrees in different academic fields. Textbooks have been made available to 90 percent of school children, and 98 percent of the teachers have attended in-service teacher training. Although most children have access to education, some problems remain. For example, there is insufficient spending on school materials, lunches, and books.

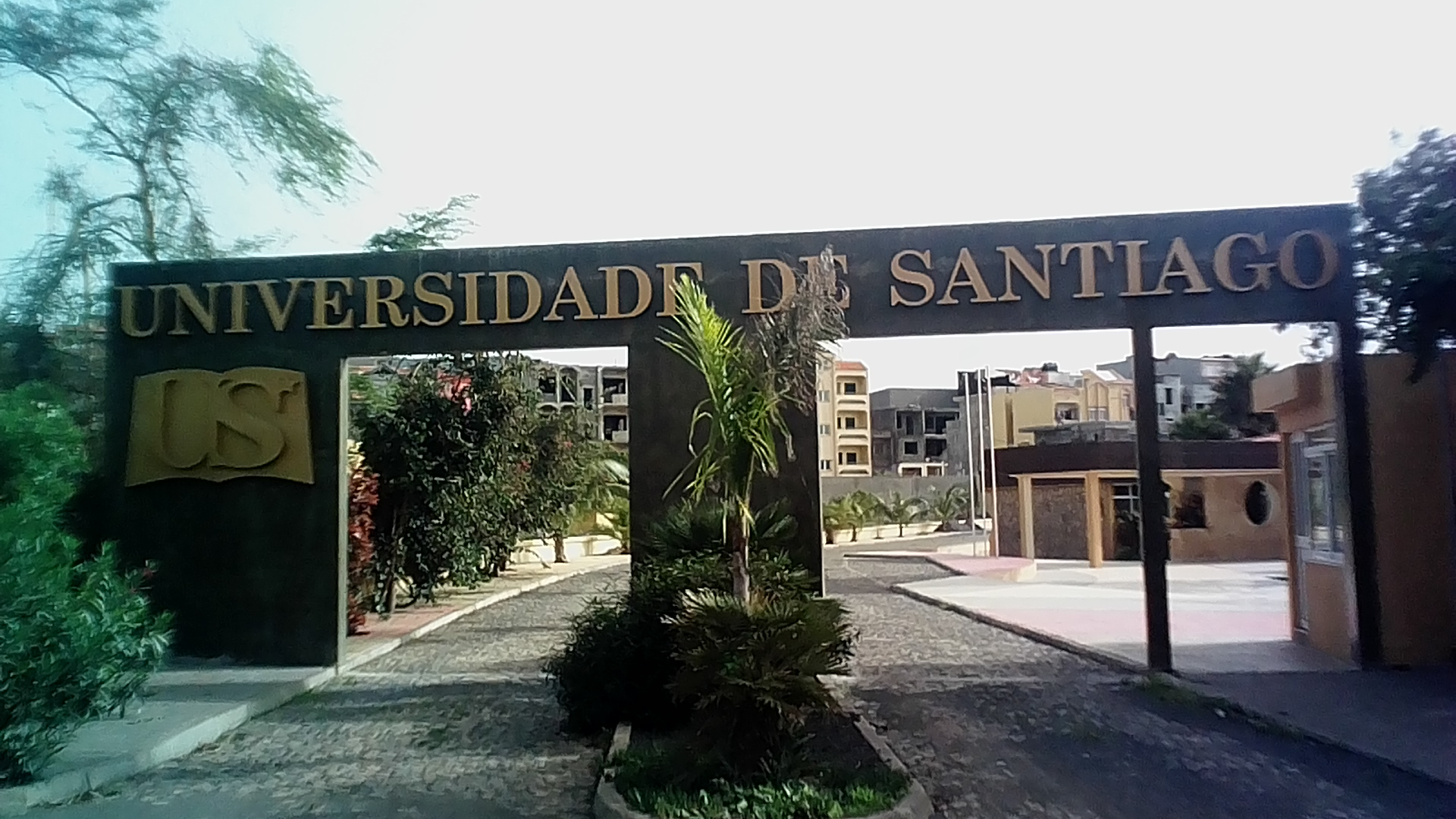
University of Santiago

As of October 2016, there were 69 secondary schools (including 19 private secondary schools) and at least 10 universities. In 2015, 23% of the population had either attended or graduated from secondary schools. When it came to higher education, 9% of men and 8% of women held a bachelor's degree or had attended universities. The total expenditure on education was 5.6% of GDP (2010). The mean number of years of schooling among adults over 25 years was 12. These trends continued in 2017. Cape Verde stands out in West Africa for the quality and inclusiveness of its higher education system. As of 2017, one in four young people attended university and one-third of students opted for fields of science, technology, engineering, and mathematics. Women made up one-third of students but two-thirds of graduates in 2018.

=== Science and technology ===
In 2011, Cape Verde devoted just 0.07% of its GDP to research and development, among the lowest rates in West Africa. The Ministry of Higher Education, Science and Culture plan to strengthen the research and academic sectors by emphasizing greater mobility, through exchange programmes and international cooperation agreements. As part of this strategy, Cape Verde is participating in the Ibero-American academic mobility programme that expects to mobilize 200,000 academics between 2015 and 2020. Cape Verde was ranked 95th in the Global Innovation Index in 2025.

Cape Verde counted 25 researchers in 2011, a researcher density of 51 per million inhabitants. The world average was 1,083 per million in 2013. All 25 researchers were working in the government sector in 2011 and one in three were women (36%). There was no research being conducted in either medical or agricultural sciences. Of the eight engineers involved in research and development, one was a woman. Three of the five researchers working in natural sciences were women, as were three of the six social scientists and two of the five researchers from the humanities.

In 2015, the government announced a project to build a technology park for business, research, and development. Named TechPark Cabo Verde, operations began in 2023, and the technology park had its official inauguration in 2025. The project is funded by both the African Development Bank and the government of Cape Verde. The goal of the endeavour, according to Minister of Finance Olavo Correia, is "to attract large international companies to set up shop [in order] to help local companies and start-ups become more competitive".

Cape Verde has a high rate of Internet penetration and a growing mobile phone market. The government has invested in improving ICT infrastructure and has created a number of initiatives to promote the development of the digital economy. The digital economy has the potential to create jobs, boost economic growth, and improve the quality of life.

=== Crime ===
Theft and burglary are common, especially in crowded environments such as marketplaces, festivals, and celebrations. Often the perpetrators of these crimes are gangs of street children. Murders are concentrated in the major population centres of Praia and Mindelo.

== Culture ==
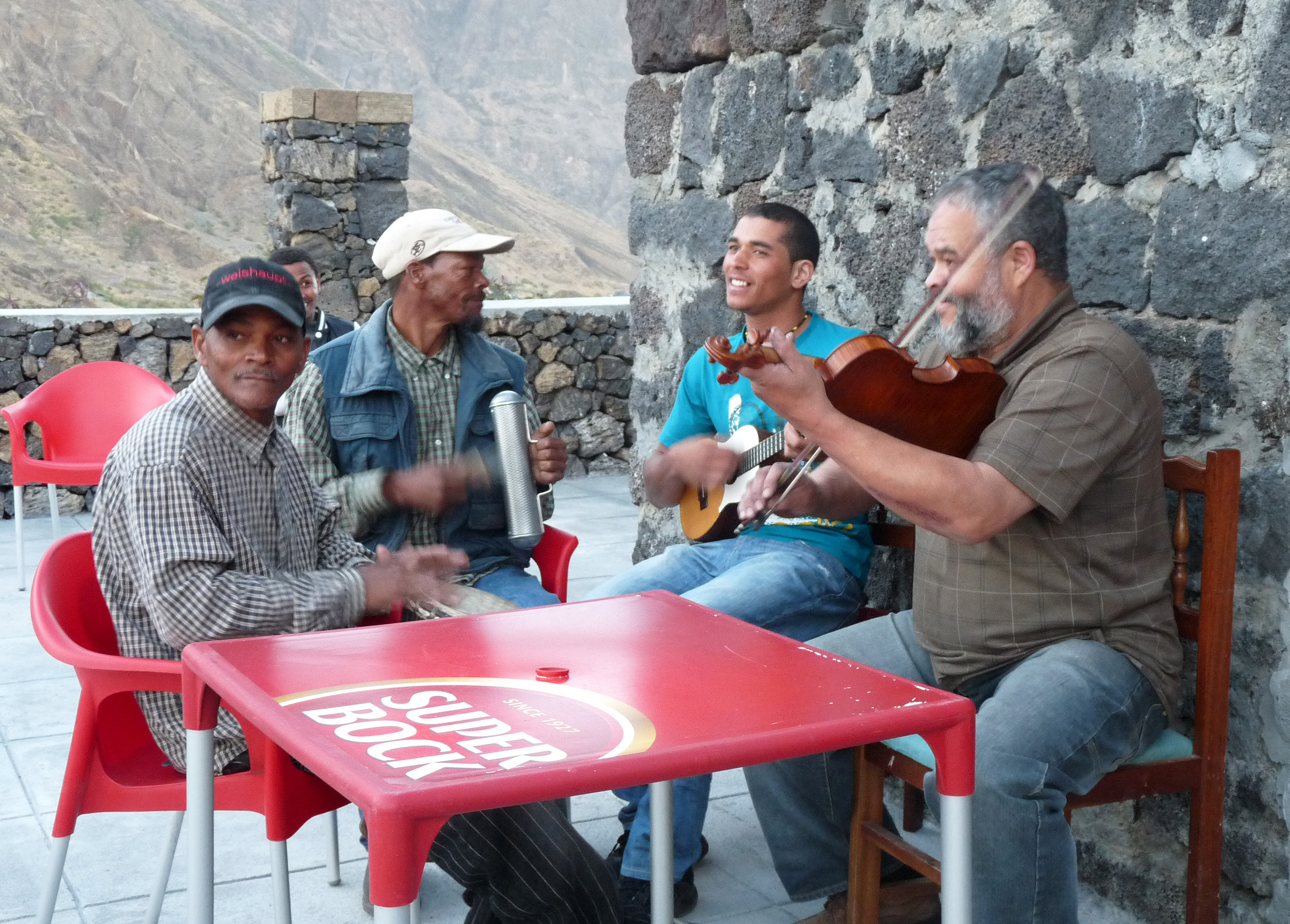
Cape Verdeans are very musical people; this group from Chã das Caldeiras is an example.

The culture of Cape Verde is characterized by a mixture of African and European elements, while the language and religion are of European origin, several other aspects, such as dance and music, are a unique blend of the cultural heritage of the two different continents.

Football games and church activities are typical sources of social interaction and entertainment. The traditional walk around the praça (town square) to meet friends is practised regularly in Cape Verdean towns.

=== Media ===
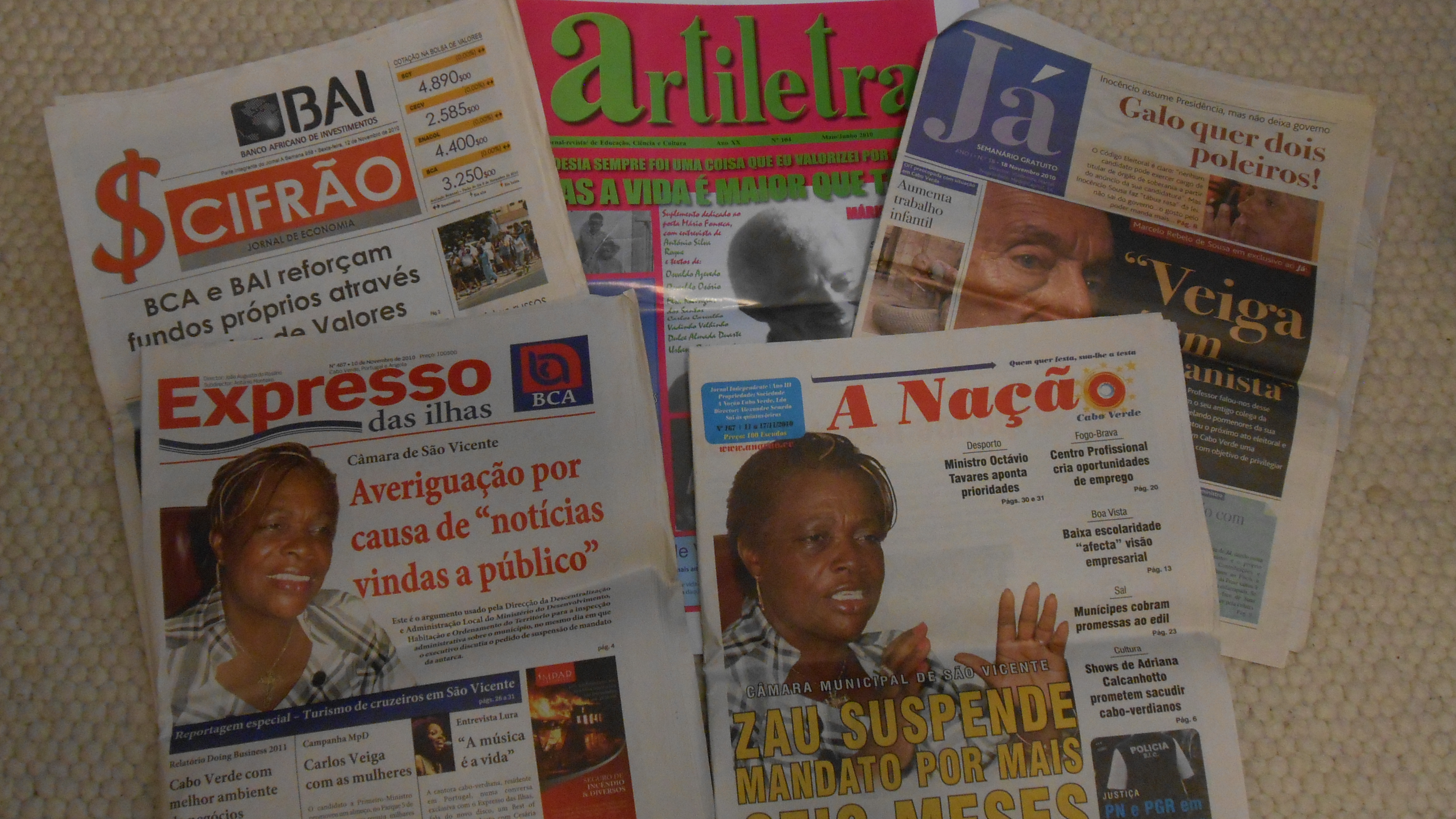
Newspapers of Cape Verde including Expresso das Ilhas, A Nação and Já

In towns with electricity, television is available on four channels; one state-owned (RTC – TCV) and three foreign-owned: RTI Cabo Verde launched by the Portuguese-based RTI in 2005; Record Cabo Verde, launched by the Brazilian-based Rede Record on 31 March 2007; and as of 2016, TV CPLP. Premium channels available include the Cape Verdean versions of Boom TV and Zap Cabo Verde, two channels owned by Brazil's Record. Other premium channels are available in Cape Verde, especially satellite network channels which are common in hotels and villas, though availability is otherwise limited. One such channel is RDP África, the African version of the Portuguese radio station RDP.

As of early 2023, about 99% of the population own an active cellular phone, 70% have access to the Internet, 11% own a landline telephone, and 2% subscribe to local cable TV.

In 2004, there were seven radio stations: six independent and one state-owned. The media is operated by the Cape-Verdean News Agency (secondarily as Inforpress). Nationwide radio stations include RCV, RCV+, Radio Kriola, and the religious station Radio Nova. Local radio stations include Rádio Praia, the first radio station in Cape Verde; Praia FM, the first FM station in the nation; Rádio Barlavento, Rádio Clube do Mindelo and Radio Morabeza in Mindelo.

=== Music ===
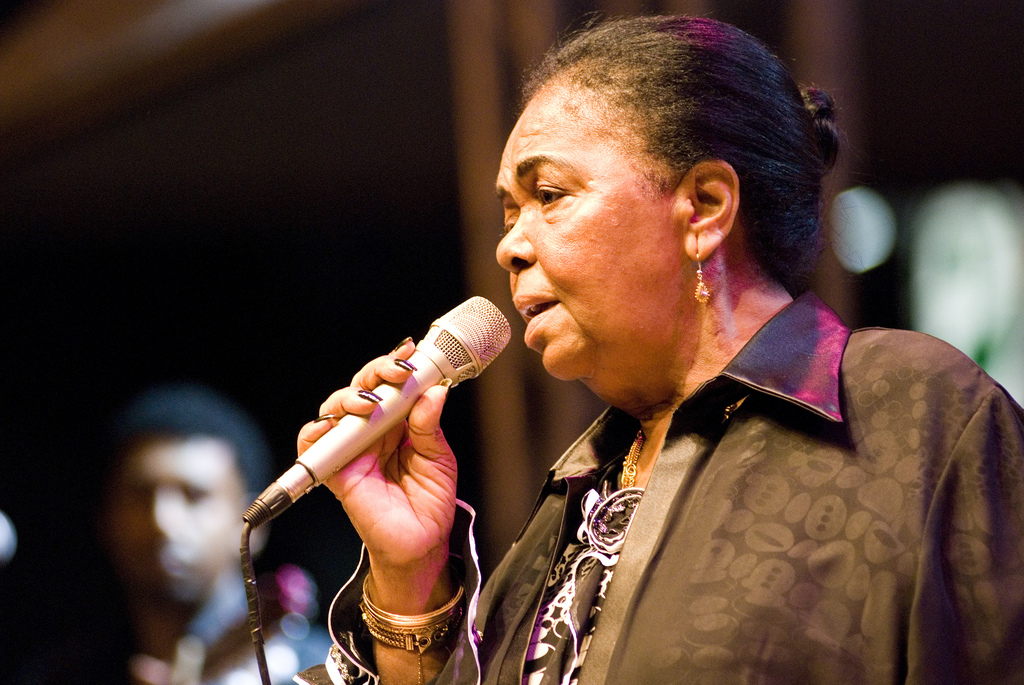
Cesária Évora, Cape Verdean singer

The Cape Verdean people are known for their musicality, well expressed by popular manifestations such as the Carnaval of Mindelo. Cape Verdean music incorporates "African, Portuguese, and Brazilian influences." The national music is the morna, a melancholy and lyrical song form typically sung in Cape Verdean Creole. The most popular music genre after morna is the coladeira, followed by funaná and batuque music. Cesária Évora was the best-known Cape Verdean singer in the world, known as the "barefoot diva", because she liked to perform barefooted on stage. She was also referred to as "The Queen of Morna" as opposed to her uncle Bana, who was referred to as "King of Morna". The Cape Verdean diaspora experience is reflected in many artistic and cultural expressions, such as Évora's song Sodade. Other singers include Sara Tavares, Lura and Mayra Andrade.

Another great exponent of traditional music from Cape Verde was Antonio Vicente Lopes, better known as Travadinha, and Ildo Lobo, who died in 2004. The House of Culture in the centre of the city of Praia is called Ildo Lobo House of Culture in his honour.

=== Dance ===
The most popular dance genre is called funaná which originated on Santiago and is danced solo or in pairs with fast knee flexions and a lively rhythm. Another popular dance genre is coladeira, a slower dance genre that originated on São Vicente. Batuque originated on Santiago and involves a lot of hip movement and percussion. Zouk and Kizomba are newer popular dance genres that originated in other countries.

=== Literature ===
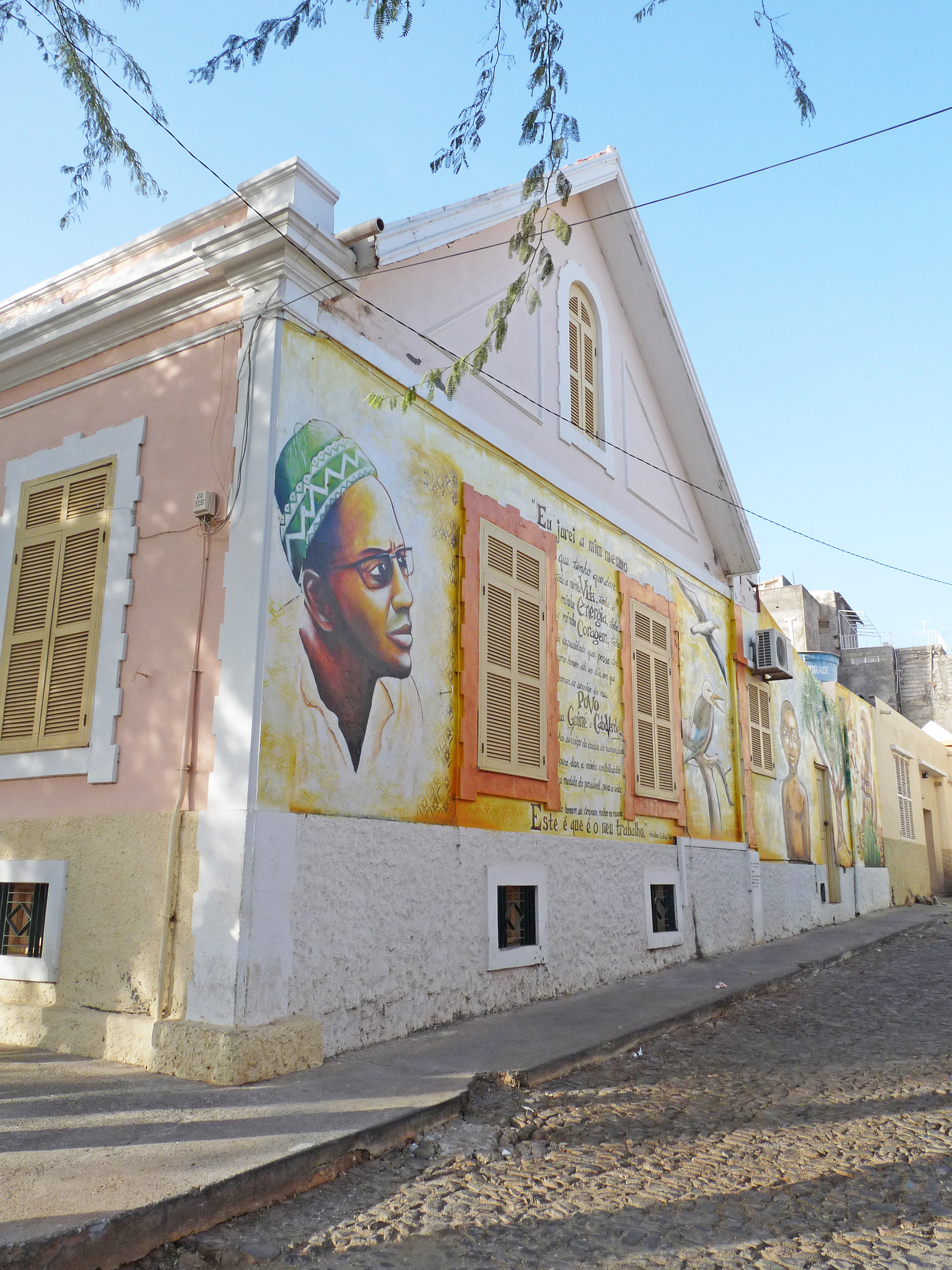
Fundação Amílcar Cabral, in Praia

Cape Verdean literature is one of the richest of Lusophone Africa. Poets include Paulino Vieira, Manuel de Novas, Sergio Frusoni, Eugénio Tavares, and B. Léza, and authors include Baltasar Lopes da Silva, António Aurélio Gonçalves, Manuel Lopes, Orlanda Amarílis, Henrique Teixeira de Sousa, Arménio Vieira, Kaoberdiano Dambará, Dr. Azágua, and Germano Almeida. The first novel written by a woman from Cape Verde was A Louca de Serrano by Dina Salústio; its translation, as The Madwoman of Serrano, was the first translation of any Cape Verdean novel to English.

=== Cinema ===
The carnival and the island of São Vicente are portrayed in the 2015 feature documentary Tchindas, nominated at the 12th Africa Movie Academy Awards. It was the location for the 2023 French film Ama Gloria by Marie Amachoukeli.

=== Cuisine ===
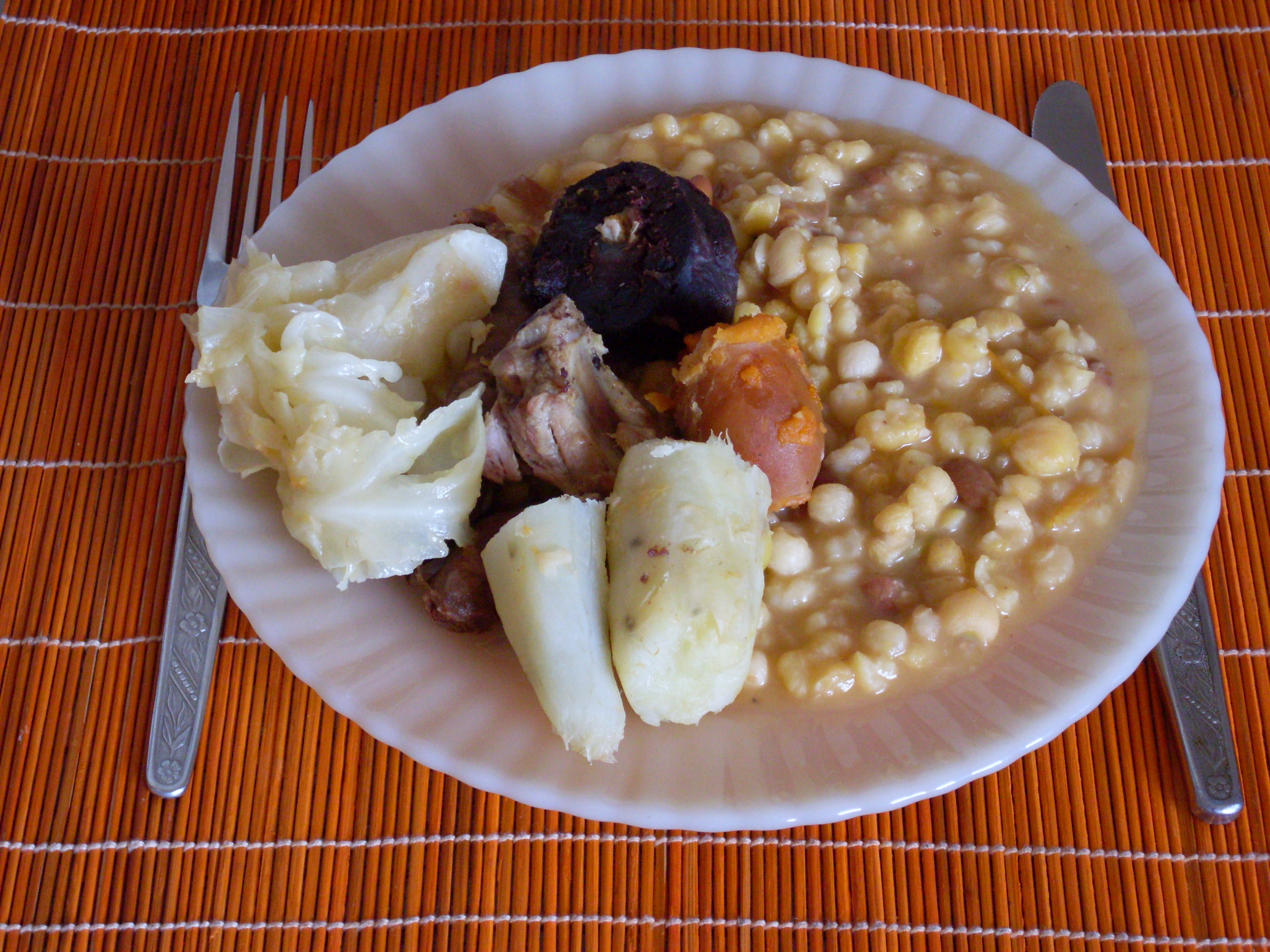
Cachupa, typical Cape Verdean dish

Cape Verdean cuisine is mostly based on fish and staple foods like corn and rice. Vegetables available during most of the year are potatoes, onions, tomatoes, manioc, cabbage, kale, and dried beans. Fruits such as bananas and papayas are available year-round, while others like mangoes and avocados are seasonal.

A popular dish is cachupa, a slow-cooked stew of corn (hominy), beans, and fish or meat. A common appetizer is the pastel, a pastry shell filled with fish or meat that is then fried. Grogue, a spirit made from sugarcane juice, is a popular alcoholic beverage that forms the basis of ponche, a form of punch.

=== Sports ===
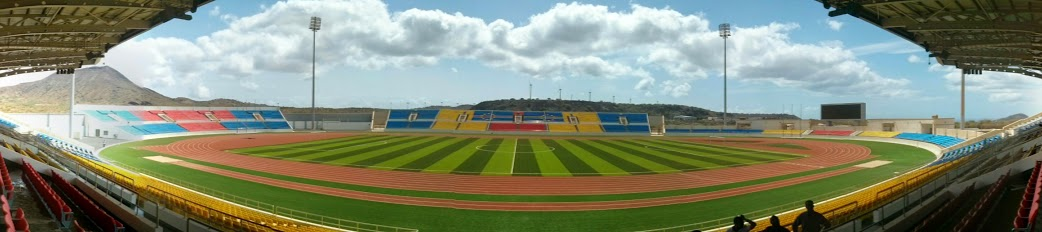
Estádio Nacional de Cabo Verde in Praia

The most successful sports team is the Cape Verde men's national handball team, which won the silver medal at the 2022 African Men's Handball Championship and the bronze medal at the 2026 African Men's Handball Championship. They made their first appearance at the African Men's Handball Championship in 2020, and they have been participating in the IHF World Men's Handball Championship since 2019.

Cape Verde is famous for wave sailing (a type of windsurfing) and kiteboarding. Josh Angulo, a Hawaiian and 2009 PWA Wave World Champion, has done much to promote the archipelago as a windsurfing destination. Mitu Monteiro, a local kite-surfer was the 2008 Kite Surfing World Champion in the wave discipline.

Cape Verde is represented by a national team in association football, nicknamed the Tubarões Azuis (lit. 'Blue Sharks'), which is controlled by the Cape Verdean Football Federation (FCF). The team has contested four Africa Cup of Nations—in 2013, 2015, 2021, and 2023—and qualified for its first FIFA World Cup in 2026, where it became the first debutant side since Slovakia in 2010 to progress to the knockout stage following acclaimed draws against favoured sides Spain, Uruguay, and Saudi Arabia. It garnered further acclaim for taking reigning champions Argentina to extra time in the round of 32, ultimately losing 3–2.

The women's national football team also achieved qualification to the Women's Africa Cup of Nations for the first time at the tournament's 2026 edition.

Cape Verde has competed at every Summer Olympics since 1996 but did not win its first medal until 2024, when Daniel Varela de Pina won a bronze medal in boxing. In 2016, Gracelino Barbosa became the first Cape Verdean to win a medal at the Paralympic Games.

== Transport ==
=== Ports ===
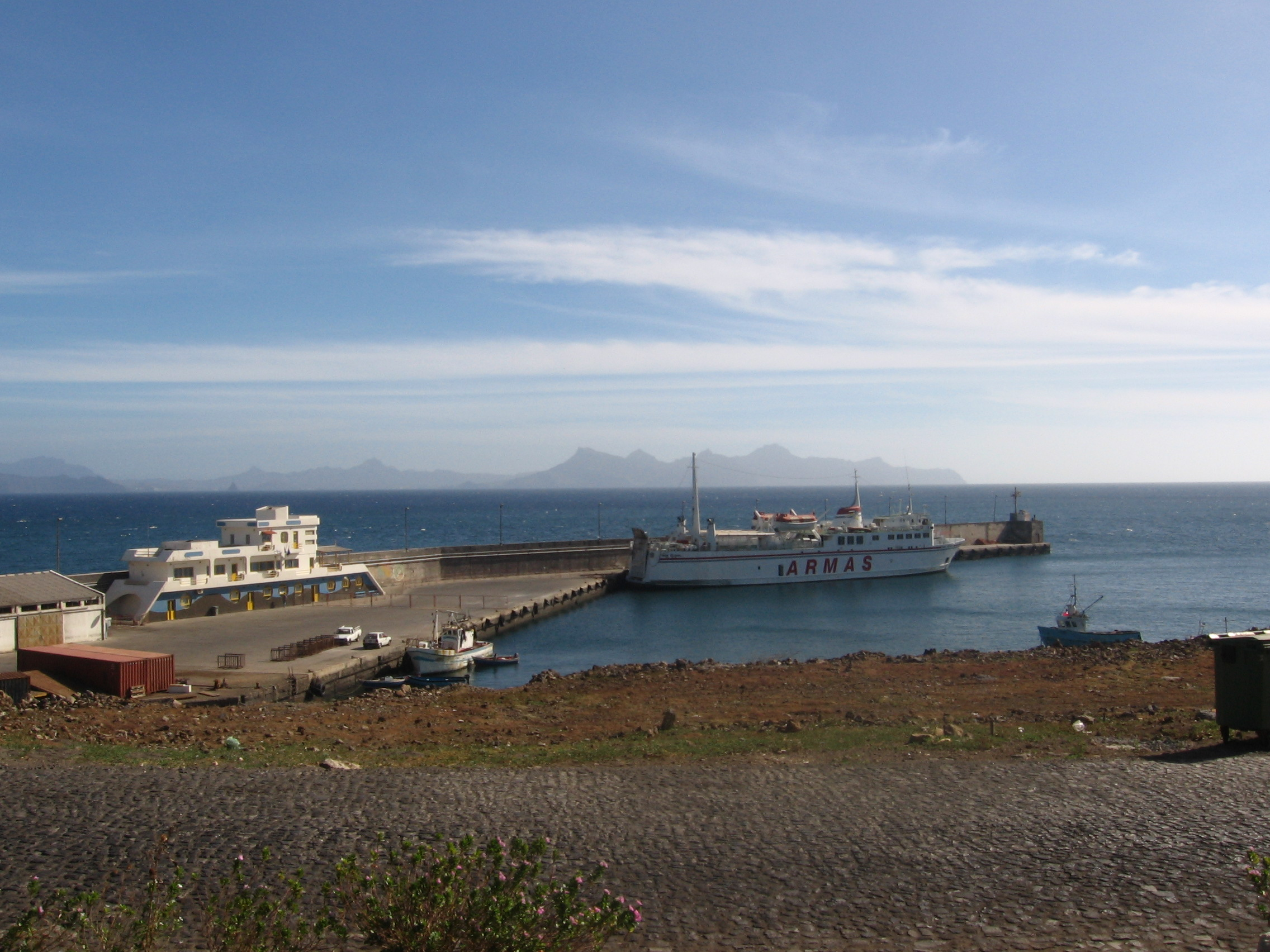
Porto Novo harbour in Santo Antão

There are four international ports: Mindelo, Praia, Palmeira, and Sal Rei. Mindelo on São Vicente is the main port for cruise ships and the terminus for the ferry service to Santo Antão. Praia on Santiago is the main hub for local ferry services to other islands. Palmeira on Sal supplies fuel for the main airport on the island, Amílcar Cabral International Airport, and is important for the hotel construction taking place on the island. Porto Novo on Santo Antão is the only source for imports and exports of produce from the island, as well as passenger traffic, since the closure of the airstrip at Ponta do Sol.

There are smaller harbours, essentially single jetties at Tarrafal on São Nicolau, Sal Rei on Boa Vista, Vila do Maio (Porto Inglês) on Maio, São Filipe on Fogo and Furna on Brava. These act as terminals for the inter-island ferry services, which carry both freight and passengers. The pier at Santa Maria on Sal, used by both fishing and dive boats, has been rehabilitated.

=== Airports ===
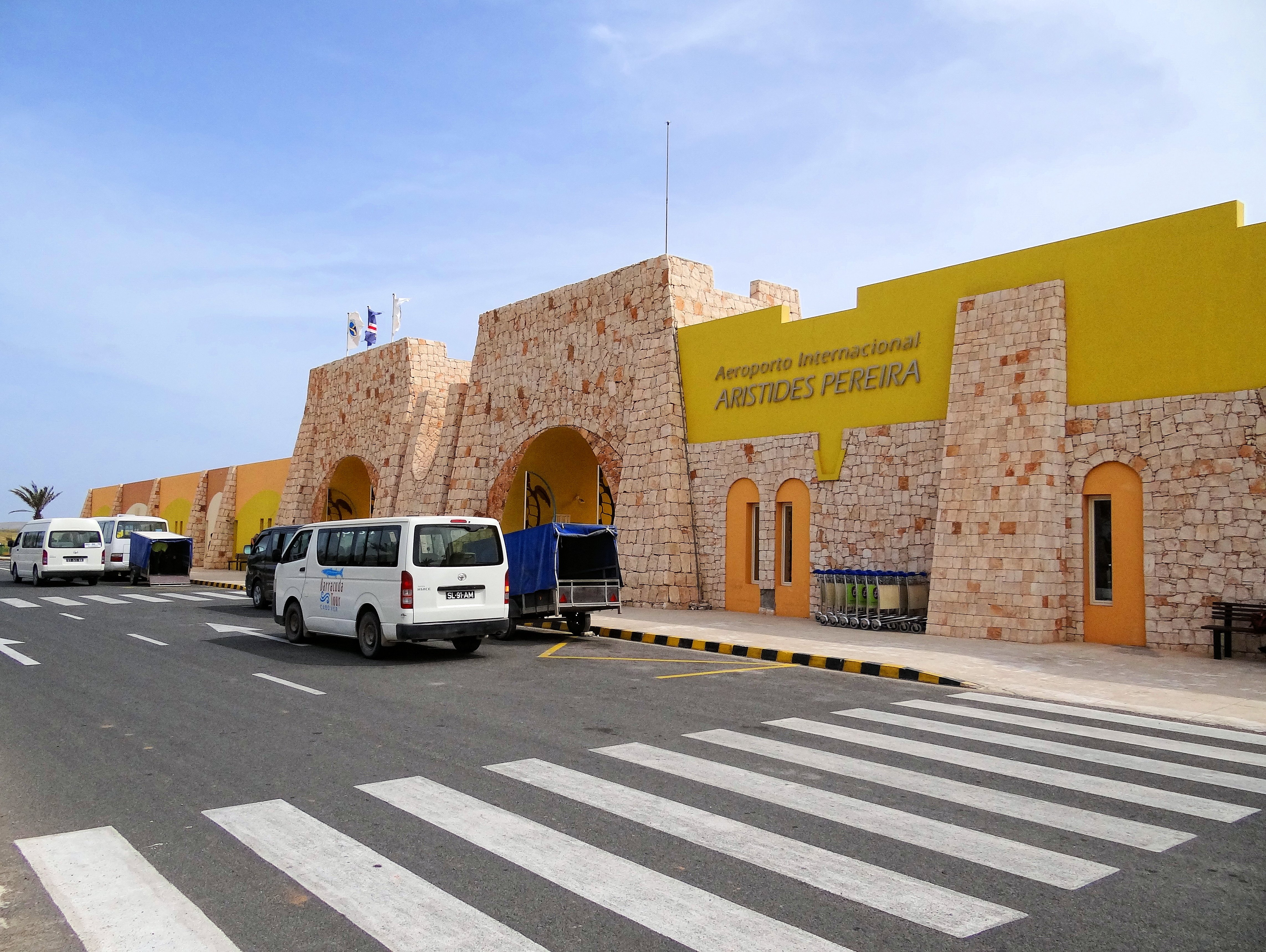
Aristides Pereira International Airport in Boa Vista island

There were seven operational airports as of October 2026 – four international and three domestic. Two others were non-operational, one on Brava and the other on Santo Antão closed for safety reasons.

Due to its geographical location, Cape Verde is often flown over by transatlantic airliners. It is part of the conventional air traffic route from Europe to South America, which goes from southern Portugal via the Canary Islands and Cape Verde to northern Brazil.

==== International airports ====
- Amílcar Cabral International Airport, Sal Island
- Nelson Mandela International Airport, Santiago Island
- Aristides Pereira International Airport, Boa Vista Island
- Cesária Évora Airport, São Vicente Island

=== Aerial drones ===
Small unmanned flying drones able to carry up to 5 kg (11 lb) were being used experimentally for tasks such as delivering medicines between the islands in 2021.

== See also ==
- Outline of Cape Verde
- Islands of Macaronesia
  - Azores
  - Madeira
  - Canary Islands

== Bibliography ==
- Pim, J.; Peirce, C.; Watts, A.B.; Grevemeyer, I.; Krabbenhoeft, A. (July 2008). "Crustal structure and origin of the Cape Verde Rise". Earth and Planetary Science Letters. 272 (1–2): 422–428. Bibcode:2008E&PSL.272..422P. doi:10.1016/j.epsl.2008.05.012.
- Steer, Robert A.; Ball, Roberta; Ranieri, William F.; Beck, Aaron T. (January 1999). "Dimensions of the Beck depression inventory-II in clinically depressed outpatients". Journal of Clinical Psychology. 55 (1): 117–128. doi:10.1002/(sici)1097-4679(199901)55:1<117::aid-jclp12>3.0.co;2-a. PMID 10100838.
- Ramalho, R.; Helffrich, G.; Schmidt, D.N.; Vance, D. (May 2010). "Tracers of uplift and subsidence in the Cape Verde archipelago". Journal of the Geological Society. 167 (3): 519–538. Bibcode:2010JGSoc.167..519R. doi:10.1144/0016-76492009-056.
