= Telephone numbers in Cape Verde =

- Country: Cape Verde
- Continent: Africa
- Country code: +238
- International access: 00

The following are telephone codes in Cape Verde.

== Overview ==
Telephone numbers in Cape Verde are 7 digits long (except for special 1xx codes), and must always be dialed in their entirety (a closed dialing plan). The first 3 digits of a fixed-line (non-mobile) number correspond to its geographic area. Calls within a given 2xx area, and between certain areas, are considered local calls and priced accordingly. Mobile numbers have no geographic area, and calls to or from national mobile numbers are treated the same regardless of location.

== History ==
On July 3 2004, 2 was prepended to all fixed-line numbers, and 9 to all mobile numbers, increasing the number length to 7 digits.

== Calling format ==
- xxx xxxx - calling inside Cape Verde
- +238 xxx xxxx - calling from outside Cape Verde

The NSN length is seven digits.

== Numbering plan ==
=== Number ranges ===
In all cases listed, when a 2x range is split between two islands, one takes 2x0 through 2x4, while the other takes 2x5 through 2x9.

List of fixed allocations
Number range	Area
22	Santo Antão
221	Ribeira Grande
222	Porto Novo
223	Paul
224	Coculi
225	Ponta do Sol
226	Chã de Igreja
227	Ribeira das Patas (Lajedos / Alto Mira)
23	São Vicente / São Nicolau
230	Mindelo
231	Mindelo
232	Mindelo
235	Ribeira Brava
236	Tarrafal de São Nicolau
237	Fajã
238	Praia Branca
24	Sal
241	Espargos
242	Santa Maria
25	Boa Vista / Maio
251	Sal Rei
252	Fundo das Figueiras
255	Vila do Maio
256	Calheta
26	Santiago
260	Praia
261	Praia
262	Praia
263	Praia
264	Praia
265	Santa Catarina
266	Tarrafal
267	Cidade Velha
268	São Domingos
269	Pedra Badejo
27	Santiago
271	São Lourenço dos Órgãos / São Jorge
272	Picos
273	Calheta de São Miguel
28	Fogo / Brava
281	São Filipe
282	Cova Figueira
283	Mosteiros
284	São Jorge
285	Nova Sintra

List of mobile/non-geographic allocations
Number range	Usage
800	Toll-free numbers
808	Non-geographic numbers (billed as local calls from anywhere in the country)
9	Mobile phones
59	Mobile phones
330	UNITEL T+

=== Special numbers ===
- 102 - Information
- 130 - Hospital
- 131 - Fire protection
- 132 - Police
