= Ribeira dos Calhaus =

- Settlement
- Coordinates: 16.630°N 24.363°W
- Country: Cape Verde
- Island: São Nicolau
- Municipality: Tarrafal de São Nicolau
- Civil parish: São Francisco de Assis
- ID: 32107

Ribeira dos Calhaus is a settlement in the western part of the island of São Nicolau, Cape Verde. It is part of the municipality of Tarrafal de São Nicolau. It is situated in a valley northwest of Monte Gordo, 3 km southeast of Praia Branca and 7 km north of Tarrafal de São Nicolau.

== See also ==
- List of villages and settlements in Cape Verde
