= Fragata =

- Settlement
- Coordinates: 16.645°N 24.367°W
- Country: Cape Verde
- Island: São Nicolau
- Municipality: Tarrafal de São Nicolau
- Civil parish: São Francisco de Assis

Population (2010)
  - Total: 172
- ID: 32103

Fragata is a settlement in the northwestern part of the island of São Nicolau, Cape Verde. In 2010 its population was 172. It is situated 2 km south of Ribeira Prata and 9 km north of Tarrafal de São Nicolau. It consists of the localities Cruzinha, Geronimo, Santa Barbara and Fragatona (Tope).

== See also ==
- List of villages and settlements in Cape Verde
