= Palhal, Cape Verde =

Palhal
- Settlement
- Coordinates: 16.604°N 24.338°W
- Country: Cape Verde
- Island: São Nicolau
- Municipality: Tarrafal de São Nicolau
- Civil parish: São Francisco de Assis

Population (2010)
  - Total: 100
- ID: 32105

Palhal is a settlement in the western part of the island of São Nicolau, Cape Verde. In 2010 its population was 100. It is situated 2 km west of Cabeçalinho and 5 km northeast of Tarrafal de São Nicolau.

== See also ==
- List of villages and settlements in Cape Verde
