= Hortelã =

- Settlement
- Coordinates: 16.611°N 24.353°W
- Country: Cape Verde
- Island: São Nicolau
- Municipality: Tarrafal de São Nicolau
- Civil parish: São Francisco de Assis

Population (2010)
  - Total: 181
- ID: 32104

Hortelã is a settlement in the western part of the island of São Nicolau, Cape Verde. In 2010 its population was 181. It is situated at the southern foot of Monte Gordo, 5 km north of Tarrafal de São Nicolau and 6 km west of Ribeira Brava.

== See also ==
- List of villages and settlements in Cape Verde
