= Ribeira Prata =

- Settlement
- Coordinates: 16.662°N 24.364°W
- Country: Cape Verde
- Island: São Nicolau
- Municipality: Tarrafal de São Nicolau
- Civil parish: São Francisco de Assis

Population (2010)
  - Total: 343
- ID: 32108

Ribeira Prata is a settlement in the northwestern part of the island of São Nicolau, Cape Verde. In 2010 its population was 343. It is situated near the north coast, 3 km northeast of Praia Branca and 11 km north of Tarrafal de São Nicolau.

== See also ==
- List of villages and settlements in Cape Verde
