= Cachaço, São Nicolau =

Cachaço
- Settlement
- Coordinates: 16.627°N 24.337°W
- Country: Cape Verde
- Island: São Nicolau
- Municipality: Ribeira Brava
- Civil parish: Nossa Senhora do Rosário

Population (2010)
  - Total: 393
- ID: 31205

Cachaço is a settlement in the northwestern part of the island of São Nicolau, Cape Verde. It is situated 3 km southwest of Fajã de Baixo and 5 km west of Ribeira Brava. It lies on the national road from Tarrafal de São Nicolau to Ribeira Brava (EN1-SN01). Cachaço lies at about 700 m elevation, at the northeastern foot of Monte Gordo, and partly within the Monte Gordo Natural Park. Several rivers have their source near Cachaço, including the north-flowing Ribeira Grande and the east-flowing Ribeira Brava.

== See also ==
- List of villages and settlements in Cape Verde
