= List of villages and settlements in Cape Verde =

This is a list of villages and smaller settlements in Cape Verde:

== Boa Vista ==
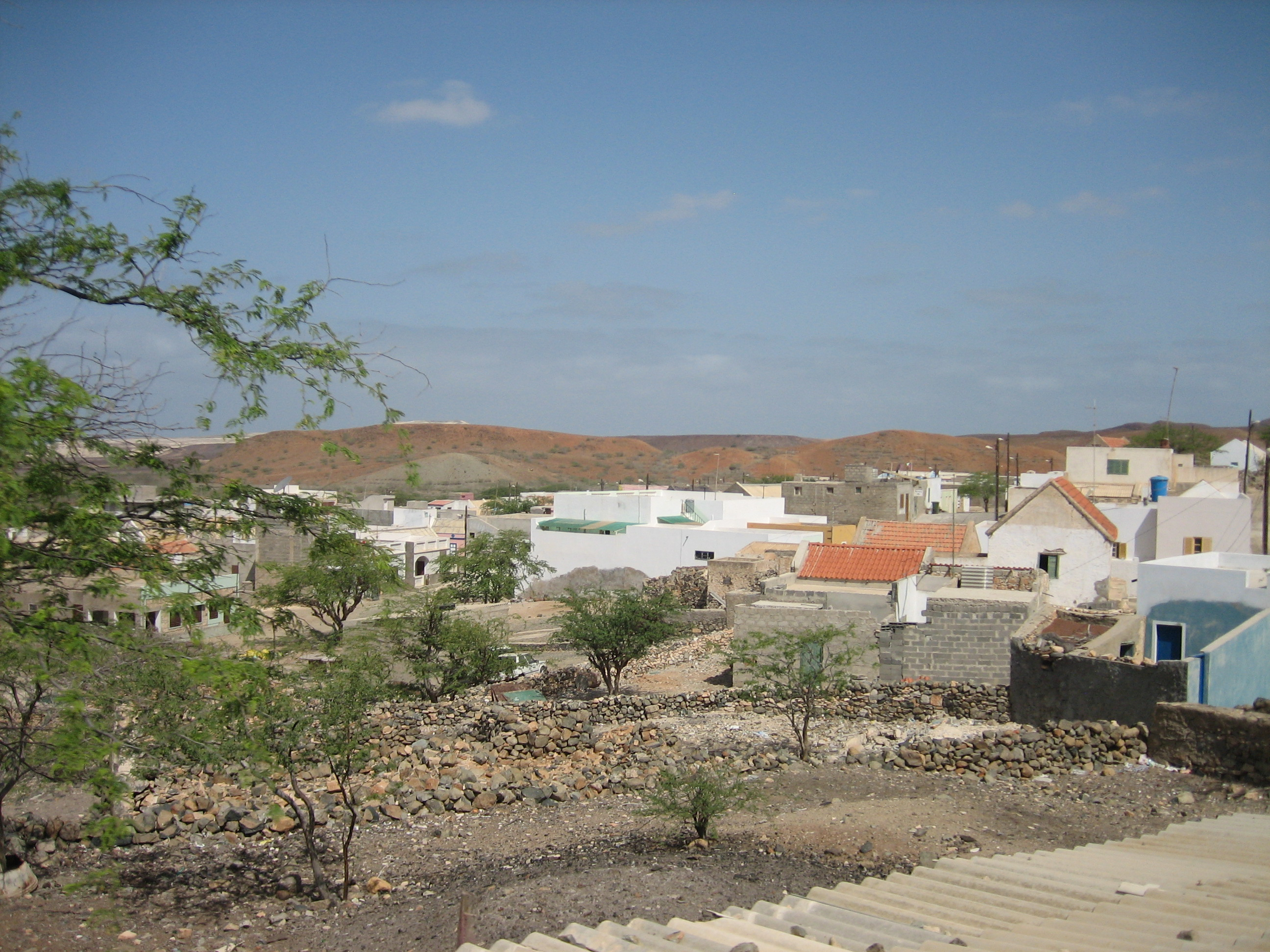
View of the village

- Bofarreira
- Cabeça dos Tarrafes
- Curral Velho - abandoned settlement
- Espingueira - Abandoned Settlement from the Village
- Estância de Baixo
- Fundo das Figueiras
- João Galego
- Povoação Velha
- Prazeres - abandoned settlement

== Brava ==
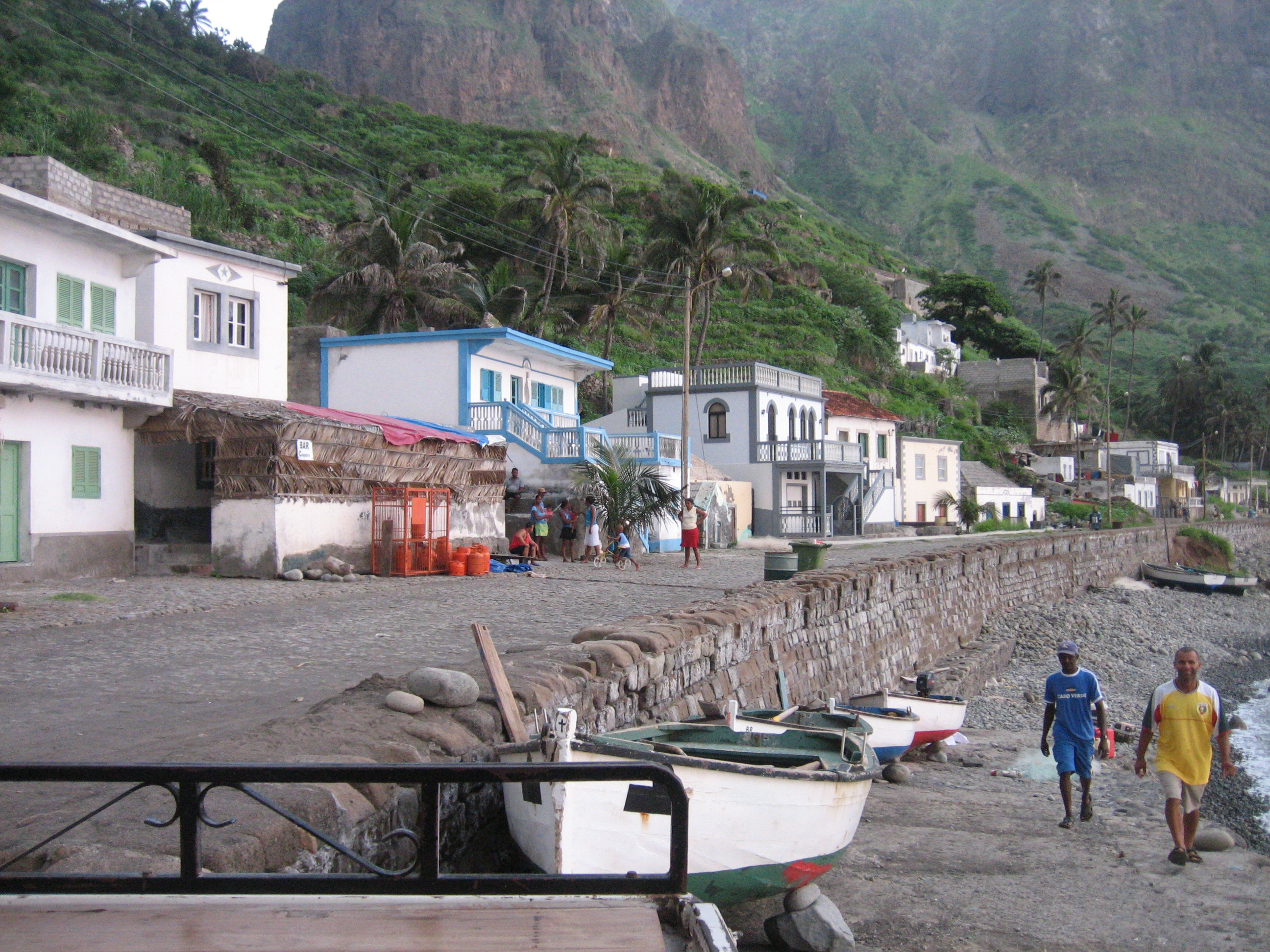
Fajã de Agua

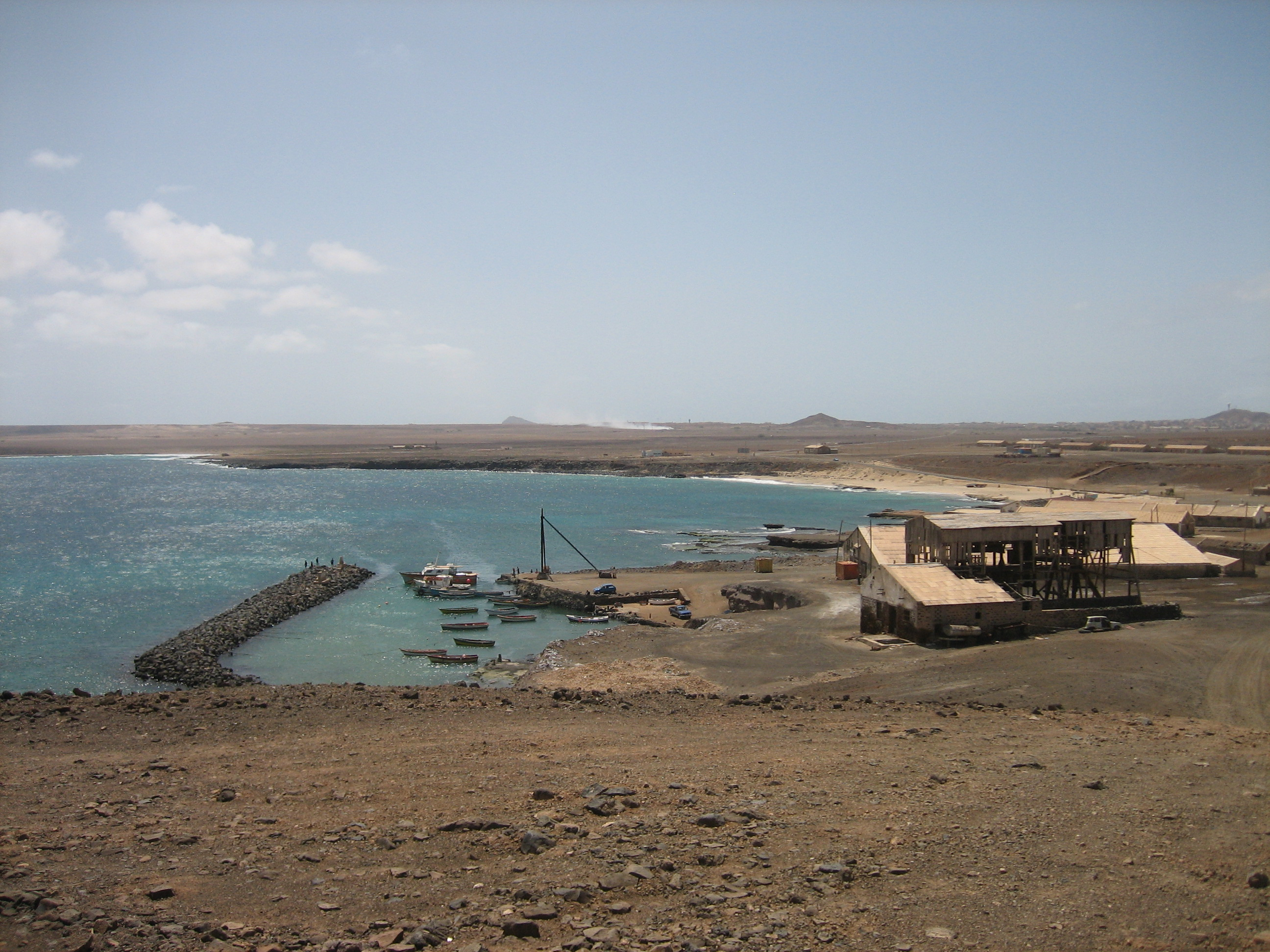
Pedra de Lume on the island of Sal

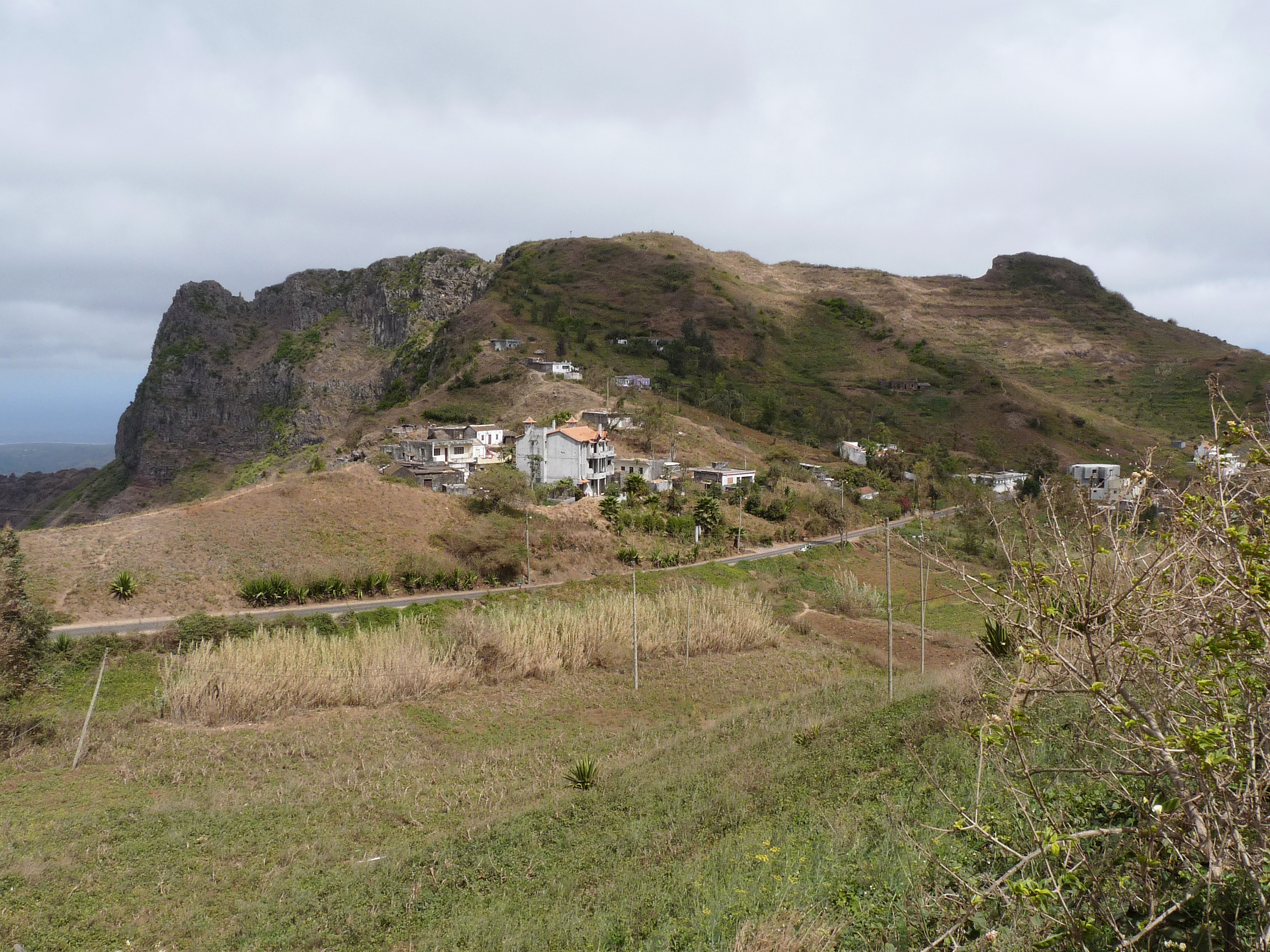
Rui Vaz on the island of Santiago

- Cachaço
- Campo Baixo
- Cova Joana
- Cova Rodela
- Fajã de Água
- João da Noly
- Lem
- Mato
- Mato Grande
- Nossa Senhora do Monte
- Santa Bárbara
- Tantum
- Tomé Barraz
- Vinagre

== Fogo ==
- Achada Furna
- Achada Grande
- Atalaia
- Cabeça Fundão
- Campanas Baixo
- Chã das Caldeiras
- Corvo
- Curral Grande
- Estância Roque
- Fajãzinha
- Feijoal
- Figueira Pavão
- Fonte Aleixo
- Galinheiro
- As Hortas
- Lagariça
- Lomba
- Miguel Gonçalves
- Monte Grande
- Patim
- Ponta Verde
- Relva
- Ribeira do Ilhéu
- Salto
- Santo António
- São Filipe
- São Jorge
- Tinteira
- Vicente Dias

== Maio ==
- Alcatraz
- Barreiro
- Calheta
- Cascabulho
- Figueira da Horta
- Morrinho
- Morro
- Pedro Vaz
- Pilão Cão
- Praia Gonçalo
- Ribeira Dom João
- Santo Antônio

== Sal ==
- Murdeira
- Palmeira
- Pedra de Lume
- Terra Boa

== Santa Luzia ==
- Santa Luzia - abandoned settlement

== Santiago ==
- Achada Fazenda
- Achada Lem
- Achada Leitão
- Achada Monte
- Achada Tenda
- Água de Gato
- Banana
- Boa Entrada
- Calabaceira
- Cancelo
- Chão de Tanque
- Chaminé
- Covão Grande
- Espinho Branco
- Fazenda
- Figueira das Naus
- João Teves
- João Varela
- Levada dos Órgãos
- Milho Branco
- Montanha
- Palha Carga
- Picos (Achada Igreja)
- Porto Gouveia
- Porto Mosquito
- Praia Baixo
- Principal, also as Ribeira Principal
- Ribeira da Barca
- Ribeira da Prata
- Ribeirão Manuel
- Rincão
- Rui Vaz
- Saltos de Cima
- Santa Ana
- São Jorge dos Órgãos
- Trás os Montes
- Vale da Custa

== Santo Antão ==
- Alto Mira
- Chã das Pedras
- Chã de Igreja
- Coculi
- Corda
- Eito
- Figueiras
- Fontainhas
- Garça de Cima
- Janela
- Lagoa
- Lajedo
- Lombo Branco
- Lombo de Santa
- Monte Trigo
- Morro Vento
- Pico da Cruz (Cinta das Vacas)
- Ribeira Alta
- Ribeira da Cruz
- Sinagoga
- Tarrafal de Monte Trigo
- Xoxo

== São Nicolau ==
- Belém
- Cabeçalinho
- Cachaço
- Caleijão
- Carriçal
- Carvoeiros
- Covoada
- Estância de Brás
- Fajã de Baixo
- Fragata
- Hortelã
- Juncalinho
- Morro Brás
- Palhal
- Praia Branca
- Preguiça
- Queimadas
- Ribeira dos Calhaus
- Ribeira Funda

== São Vicente ==
- Baía das Gatas
- Lameirão
- Lazareto Industrial (also as Industrial Lazareto)
- Ribeira de Calhau
- Ribeira de Vinha
- Salamansa
- São Pedro

== See also ==
- List of cities and towns in Cape Verde
