= Cabeçalinho =

- Settlement
- Coordinates: 16.604°N 24.321°W
- Country: Cape Verde
- Island: São Nicolau
- Municipality: Tarrafal de São Nicolau
- Civil parish: São Francisco de Assis

Population (2010)
  - Total: 155
- ID: 32101

Cabeçalinho is a settlement in the western part of the island of São Nicolau, Cape Verde. In 2010 its population was 155. It is situated 3 km southwest of Ribeira Brava and 6 km northeast of Tarrafal de São Nicolau. To its northwest is Monte Gordo.

== See also ==
- List of villages and settlements in Cape Verde
