= Carvoeiro =

Carvoeiro may refer to:

Places:

- Carvoeiro, a village on the Rio Negro, in the municipality of Barcelos in the state of Amazonas, in Brazil.
- Carvoeiro, Cape Verde, a village on the Island of São Nicolau in the Cape Verde Islands
- Carvoeiro (Lagoa), a civil parish/freguesia and a beach (Praia de Carvoeiro) in the concelho of Lagoa (Algarve), Portugal
- Carvoeiro, a civil parish/freguesia in the concelho of Mação, Portugal
- Carvoeiro, a civil parish/freguesia in the concelho of Viana do Castelo, Portugal
- Cabo Carvoeiro (Cape Carvoeiro), on the Atlantic Ocean, in the concelho of Peniche, Portugal (west coast)
- Cabo Carvoeiro (Cape Carvoeiro), on the Atlantic Ocean, in the concelho of Lagoa (Algarve), Portugal (south coast)

Other:

- the legume tree Tachigali paniculata; see Tachigali
