= Preguiça =

Preguiça may refer to the following places:

- Preguiça, part of the town Espargos on the island of Sal, Cape Verde
- Preguiça, São Nicolau, a village on the island of São Nicolau, Cape Verde
- Preguiça River in northeastern Brazil
