= João Galego =

- Settlement
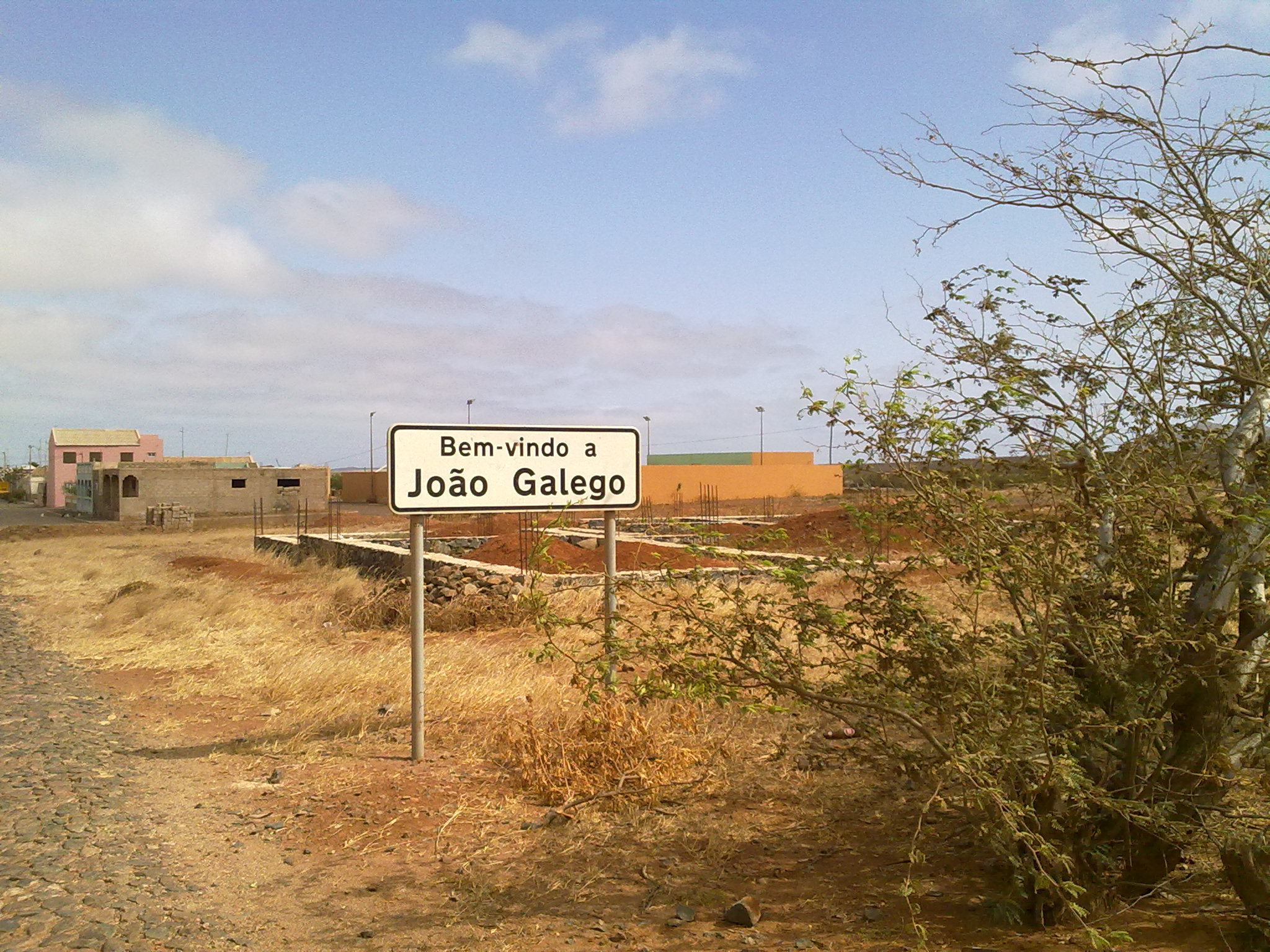
- Welcome sign into João Galego

- Location within Cape Verde
- Coordinates: 16.151°N 22.744°W
- Country: Cape Verde
- Island: Boa Vista
- Municipality: Boa Vista
- Civil parish: São João Baptista
- Elevation: 29 m (95 ft)

Population (2010)
  - Total: 346
- ID: 51103

João Galego is a village in the northeastern part of the island of Boa Vista, Cape Verde. Its population was 346 at the 2010 census. The village is around 2 km northwest of Fundo das Figueiras and 19 km east of the island capital of Sal Rei.

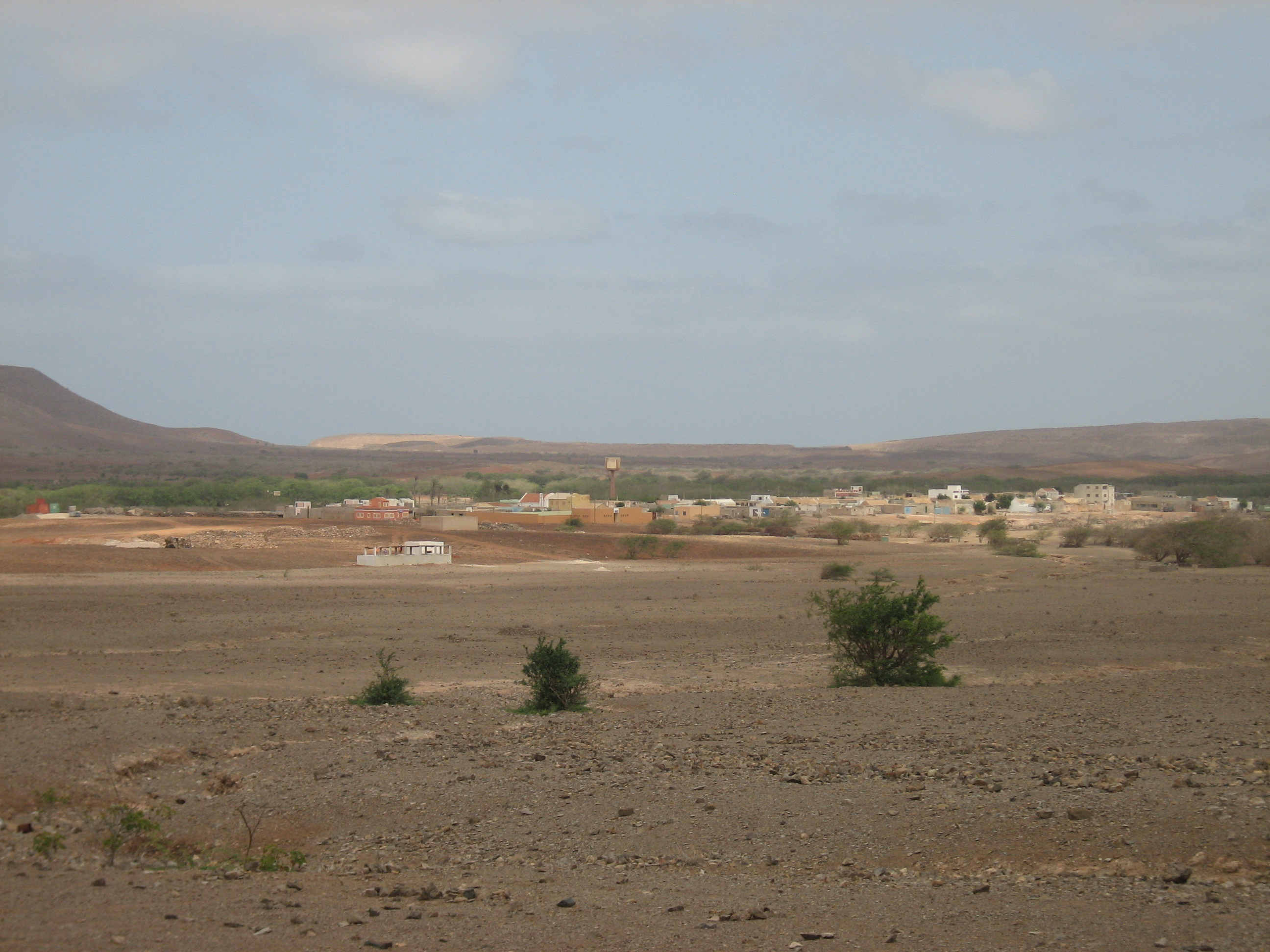
View of the village of João Galego

== See also ==
- List of villages and settlements in Cape Verde

== Gallery ==
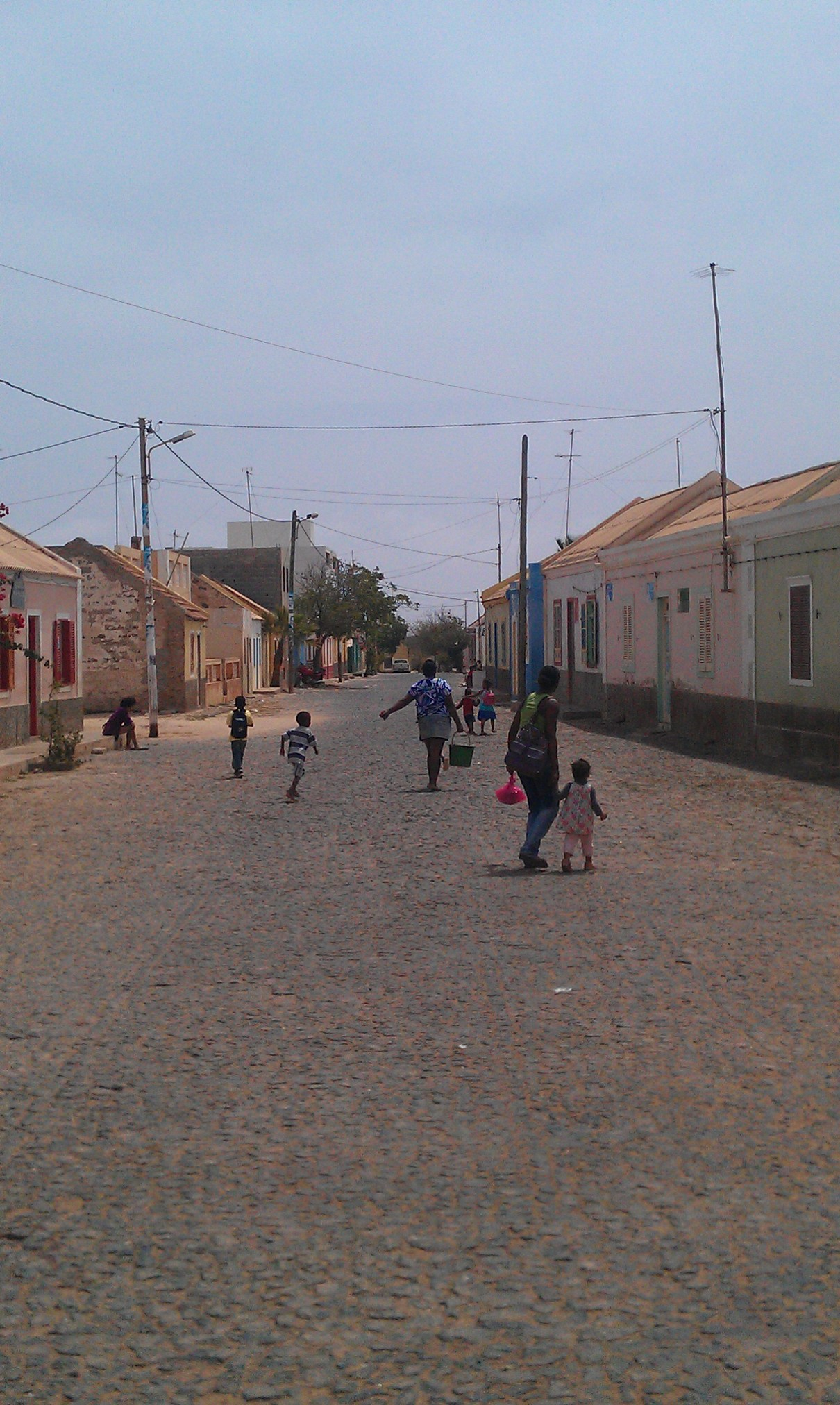
João Galego Main street (2012)

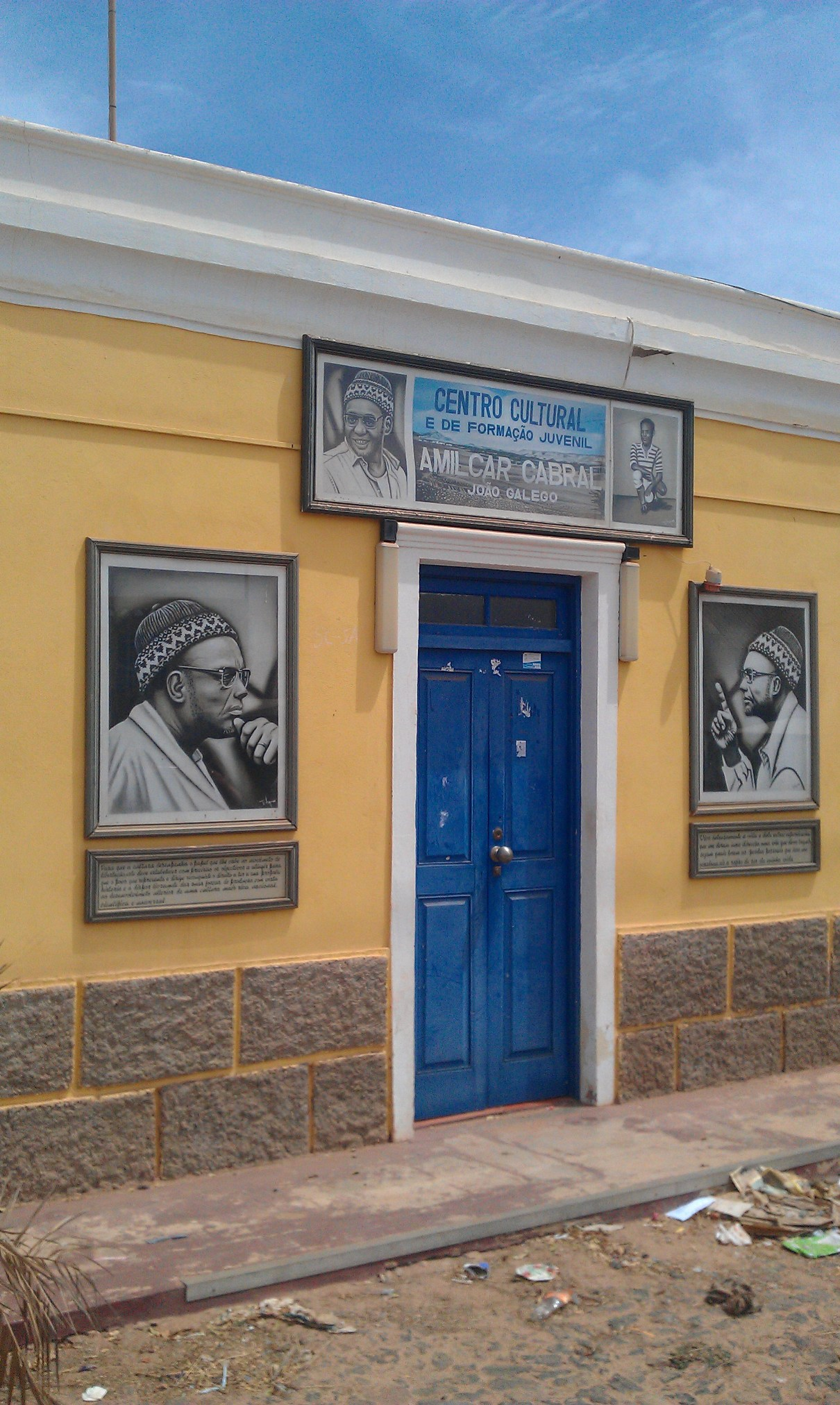
Cultural centre in João Galego (2012)

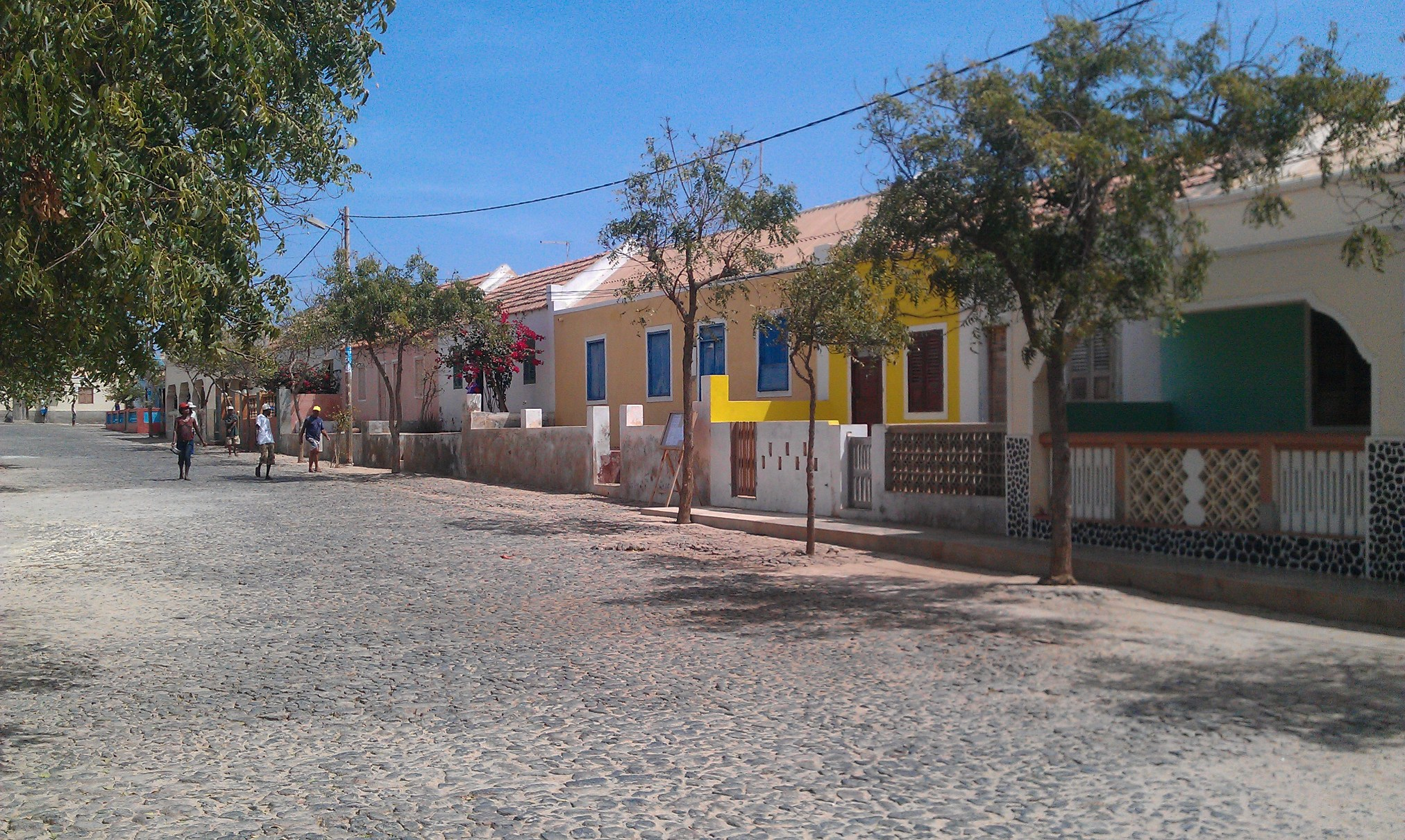
Main street of João Galego (2012)

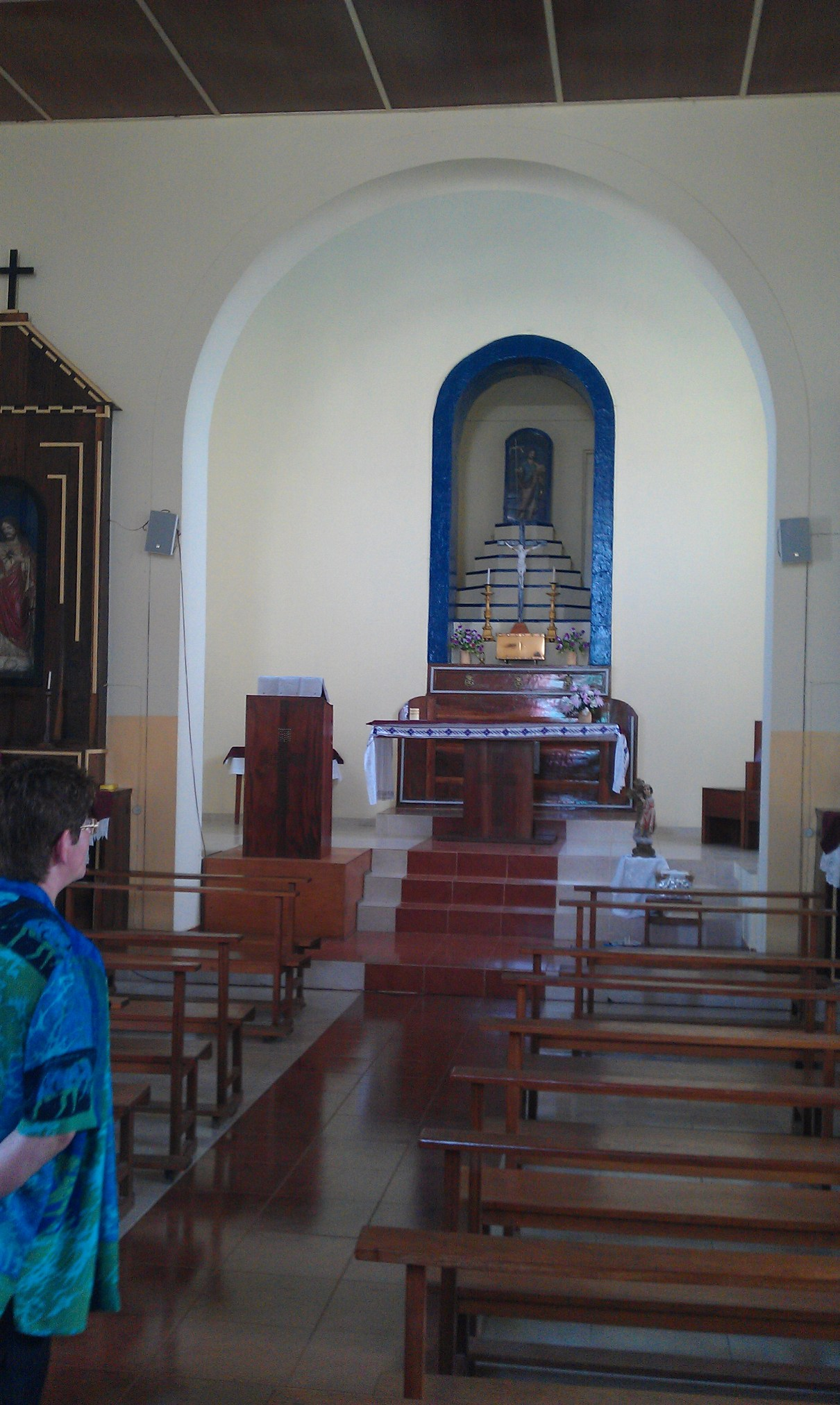
Church in João Galego (2012)

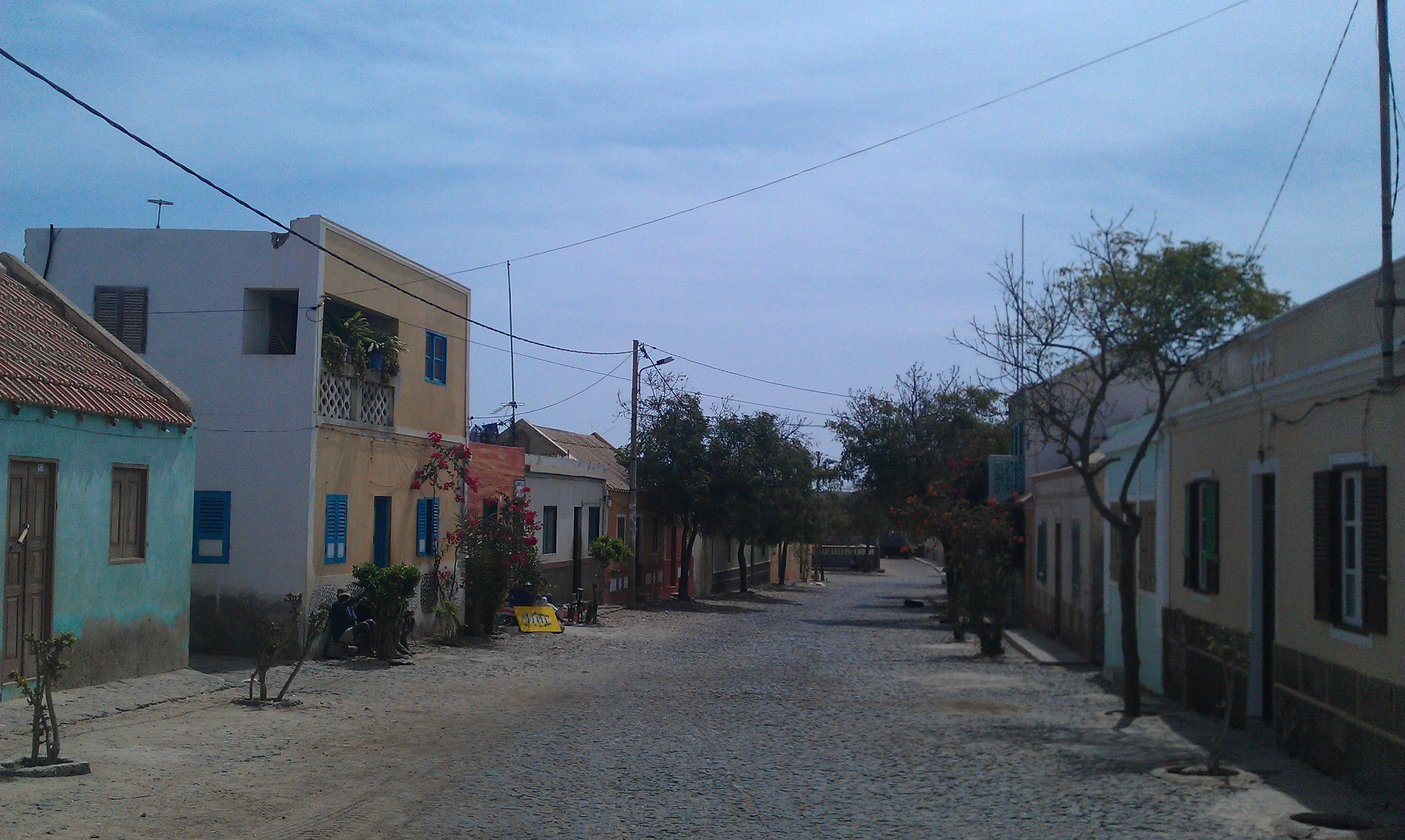
João Galego Main street (2012)
