= Santo Crucifixo =

- Civil parish
- Coordinates: 17.13°N 25.12°W
- Country: Cape Verde
- Island: Santo Antão
- Municipality: Ribeira Grande

Population (2010)
  - Total: 6,764
- ID: 113

Santo Crucifixo is a freguesia (civil parish) of Cape Verde. It covers the southern part of the municipality of Ribeira Grande, on the island of Santo Antão. The seat of the parish is Coculi. The parish covers much of the Ribeira Grande valley.

== Settlements ==
The freguesia consists of the following settlements (population at the 2010 census):

- Boca de Ambas Ribeiras (pop: 155)
- Boca de Coruja (pop: 504)
- Boca de João Afonso (pop: 166)
- Caibros (pop: 685)
- Chã de Pedras (pop: 1,266)
- Coculi (pop: 901, town)
- Corda (pop: 833)
- Figueiral (pop: 736)
- João Afonso (pop: 603)
- Lagoa (pop: 181)
- Lombo Santa (pop: 298)
- Ribeirão (pop: 436)
