= Belém, São Nicolau =

Belém
- Settlement
- Coordinates: 16.633°N 24.227°W
- Country: Cape Verde
- Island: São Nicolau
- Municipality: Ribeira Brava
- Civil parish: Nossa Senhora do Rosário

Population (2010)
  - Total: 132
- ID: 31202

Belém is a settlement in the eastern part of the island of São Nicolau, Cape Verde. It is situated 9 km east of Ribeira Brava.

== See also ==
- List of villages and settlements in Cape Verde
