= Forte do Príncipe Real =

Ruined fort in Cape Verde

Forte da Preguiça Forte do Príncipe Real
- Preguiça, São Nicolau in Cape Verde

Site information
- Open to the public: Yes
- Condition: ruins

Location
- Coordinates: 16.5641°N 24.2795°W

Site history
- Built: 1818

Forte do Príncipe Real (also: Forte da Preguiça) is a ruined fort in the village of Preguiça in the island of São Nicolau, Cape Verde. It was built in 1820 to protect the roadstead and village of Preguiça. It sits at about 50 m elevation, at the waterfront. It was abandoned in the first decades of the 20th century, and other buildings (houses, a school) were built on top of its remains. In the 1990s these buildings were cleared, and the fortress was excavated.
