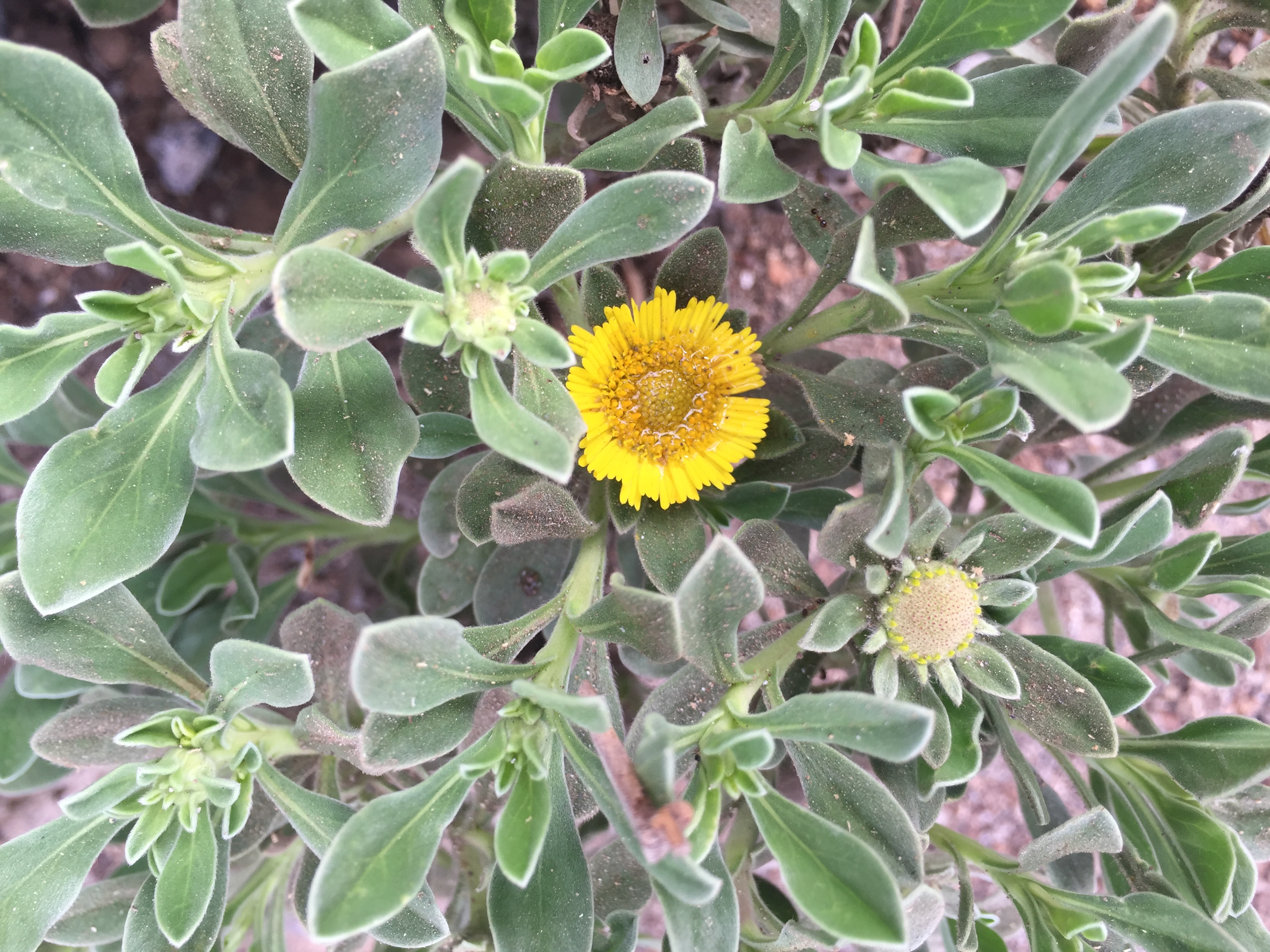

Conservation status
- Critically Endangered (IUCN 3.1)

Scientific classification
- Kingdom: Plantae
- Clade: Embryophytes
- Clade: Tracheophytes
- Clade: Spermatophytes
- Clade: Angiosperms
- Clade: Eudicots
- Clade: Asterids
- Order: Asterales
- Family: Asteraceae
- Genus: Asteriscus
- Species: A. smithii

Binomial name
- Asteriscus smithii (Webb) Walp.

Synonyms
- Bubonium smithii (Webb) Halvorsen; Nauplius smithii (Webb) A. Wilklund; Odontospermum smithii Webb

= Asteriscus smithii =

Species of flowering plant

Asteriscus smithii is a species of flowering plants of the family Asteraceae. The species is endemic to the island of São Nicolau, Cape Verde. It is listed as critically endangered due to its very restricted area of occupancy and its low population size. Its local name is macela-de-gordo.

== Description ==
Asteriscus smithii grows in the shape of a tuft, up to 0.8 m height. It produces a large number of small yellow flowers.

== Distribution and ecology ==
Asteriscus smithii occurs only in a small area on the island of São Nicolau and São Vicente at higher elevation (900–1300 m) near Monte Gordo and Monte Verde.
