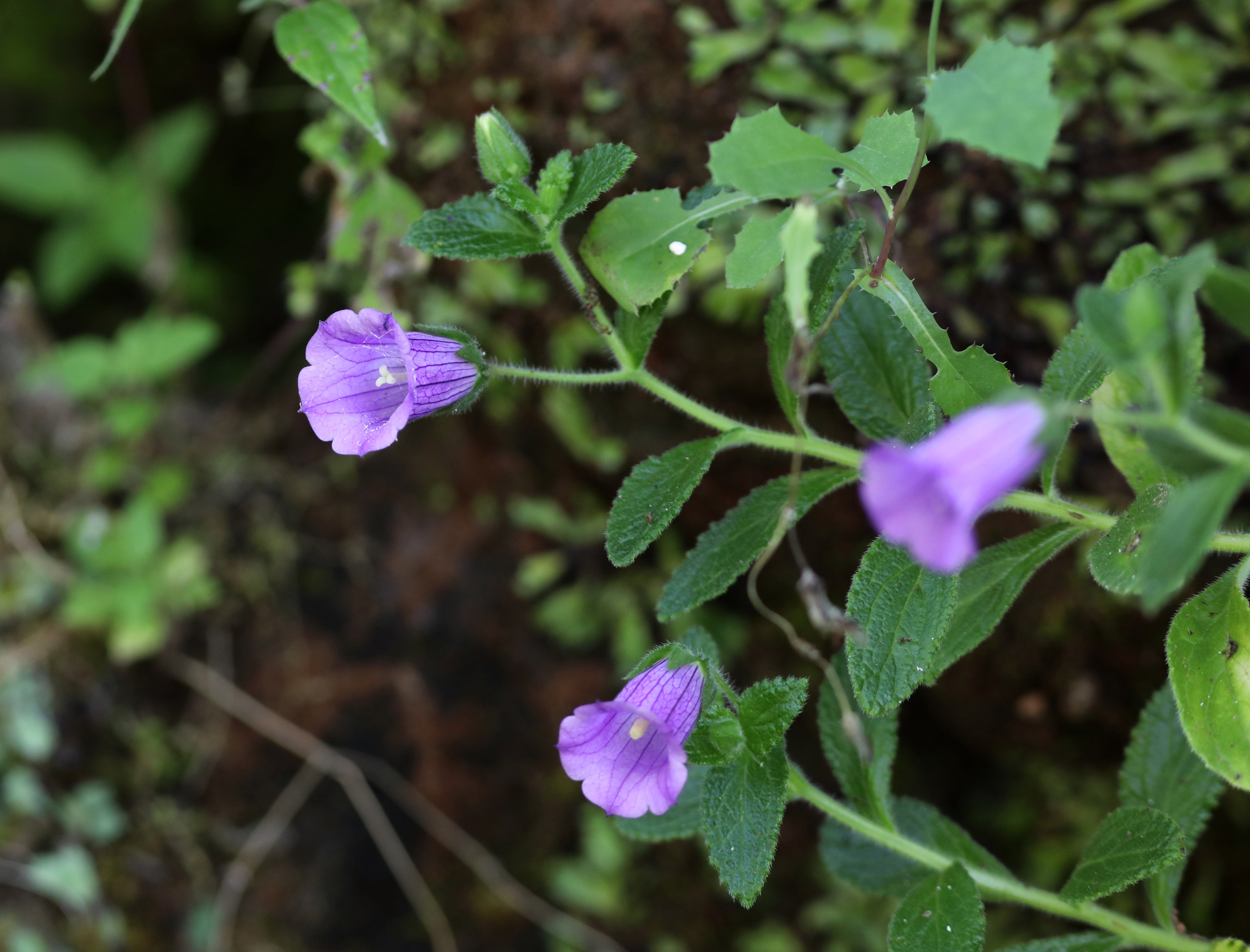
- A five Cape Verdean escudo coin showing Campanula jacobaea

Conservation status
- Vulnerable (IUCN 3.1)

Scientific classification
- Kingdom: Plantae
- Clade: Tracheophytes
- Clade: Angiosperms
- Clade: Eudicots
- Clade: Asterids
- Order: Asterales
- Family: Campanulaceae
- Genus: Campanula
- Species: C. jacobaea

Binomial name
- Campanula jacobaea C. Sm ex Webb, 1848

= Campanula jacobaea =

Species of plant

Campanula jacobaea is a species of flowering plants of the Campanulaceae family. The species is endemic to Cape Verde and is listed as vulnerable by the IUCN. Its local name is contra-bruxas-azul ("blue against witches"). The plant is used in traditional medicine. Campanula jacobaea is shown on a Cape Verdean $5 escudo coin issued in 1994.

== Distribution and ecology ==
Campanula jacobaea are founded in the islands of Santo Antão, São Vicente, São Nicolau and Santiago. The main altitudinal distribution is between 600 m and 1000 m. The plant is a mesophytic species, found in humid and sub-humid areas.
