= Cabeça dos Tarrafes =

- Settlement
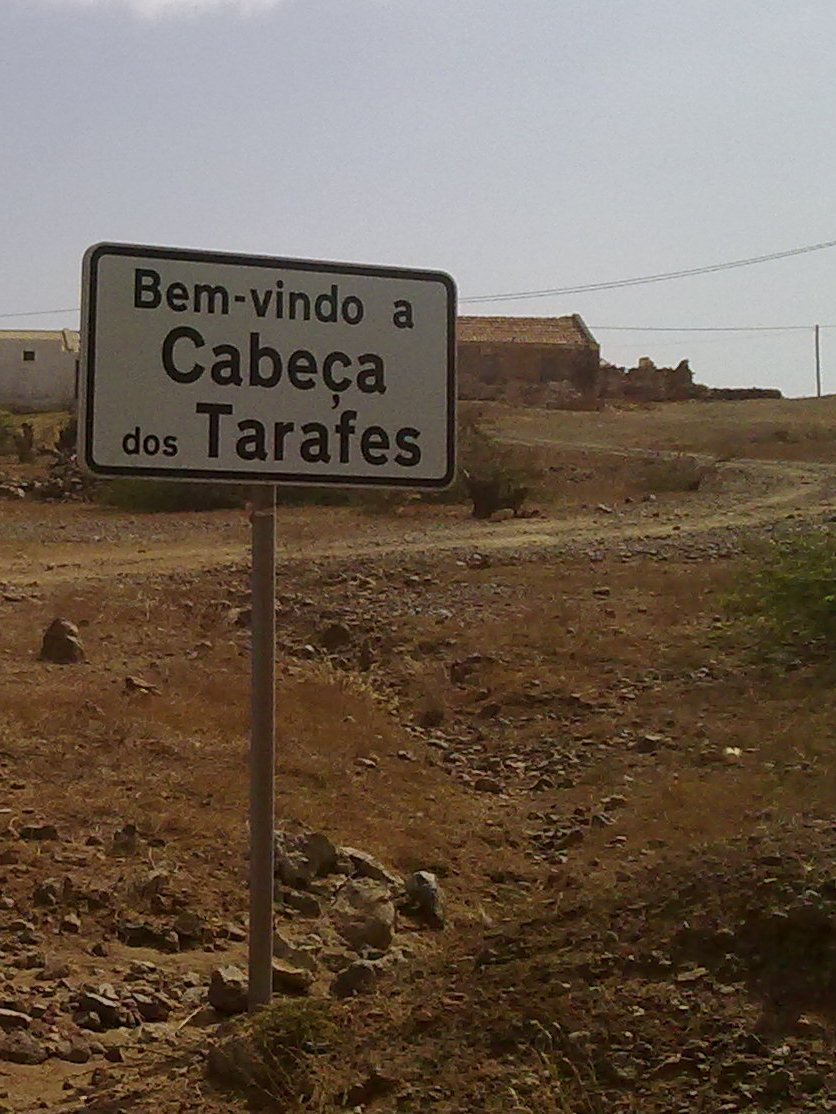
- Welcome sign of Cabeça dos Tarrafes written in the alternate spelling

- Location within Cape Verde
- Coordinates: 16.124°N 22.725°W
- Country: Cape Verde
- Island: Boa Vista
- Municipality: Boa Vista
- Civil parish: São João Baptista

Population (2010)
  - Total: 52
- ID: 51101

Cabeça dos Tarrafes (also: Cabeça dos Tarafes) is a village in the eastern part of the island of Boa Vista, Cape Verde. The village is located about 2 km south of Fundo das Figueiras and 21 km southeast of the island capital of Sal Rei. It is one of the easternmost communities in Cape Verde.

== See also ==
- List of villages and settlements in Cape Verde
