= Lombo Santa =

- Settlement
- Coordinates: 17.139°N 25.143°W
- Country: Cape Verde
- Island: Santo Antão
- Municipality: Ribeira Grande
- Civil parish: Santo Crucifixo

Population (2010)
  - Total: 298
- ID: 11311

Lombo Santa (also: Lomba de Santa) is a settlement in the northern part of the island of Santo Antão, Cape Verde. It is situated in the upper valley of the river Ribeira Grande, 10 km southwest of the town Ribeira Grande and 16 km northwest of the island capital Porto Novo.

== See also ==
- List of villages and settlements in Cape Verde
