= Nossa Senhora do Rosário (Ribeira Brava) =

- Civil parish
- Coordinates: 16.61°N 24.21°W
- Country: Cape Verde
- Island: São Nicolau
- Municipality: Ribeira Brava

Population (2010)
  - Total: 6,169
- ID: 312

Nossa Senhora do Rosário is a freguesia (civil parish) of Cape Verde. It covers the larger eastern part of the municipality of Ribeira Brava, on the island of São Nicolau.

== Subdivisions ==
The freguesia consists of the following settlements (population at the 2010 census):

- Água das Patas (pop: 108)
- Belém (pop: 132)
- Boqueirão (pop: 15)
- Cachaço (pop: 393)
- Caleijão (pop: 300)
- Campinho (pop: 266)
- Canto Fajã (pop: 238)
- Carriçal (pop: 190)
- Carvoeiros (pop 199)
- Chã de Norte (pop: 17)
- Figueira de Cocho (pop: 1)
- Juncalinho (pop: 433, town)
- Lompelado (pop: 416)
- Morro (pop: 146)
- Morro Brás (pop: 188)
- Pico Agudo (pop: 118)
- Pombas (pop: 125)
- Preguiça (pop: 567)
- Ribeira Brava (pop: 1,936, city)
- Talho (pop: 308)
