= Carvoeiros =

- Settlement
- Coordinates: 16.648°N 24.302°W
- Country: Cape Verde
- Island: São Nicolau
- Municipality: Ribeira Brava
- Civil parish: Nossa Senhora do Rosário

Population (2010)
  - Total: 199
- ID: 31209

Carvoeiros is a settlement in the northern region of the island on São Nicolau, Cape Verde. It is situated on the north coast of São Nicolau, 2 km east of Queimadas and 4 km north of Ribeira Brava.

== See also ==
- List of villages and settlements in Cape Verde
