= Espingueira =

Coordinates: 16.209°N 22.795°W

Location of Espingueira in Cape Verde

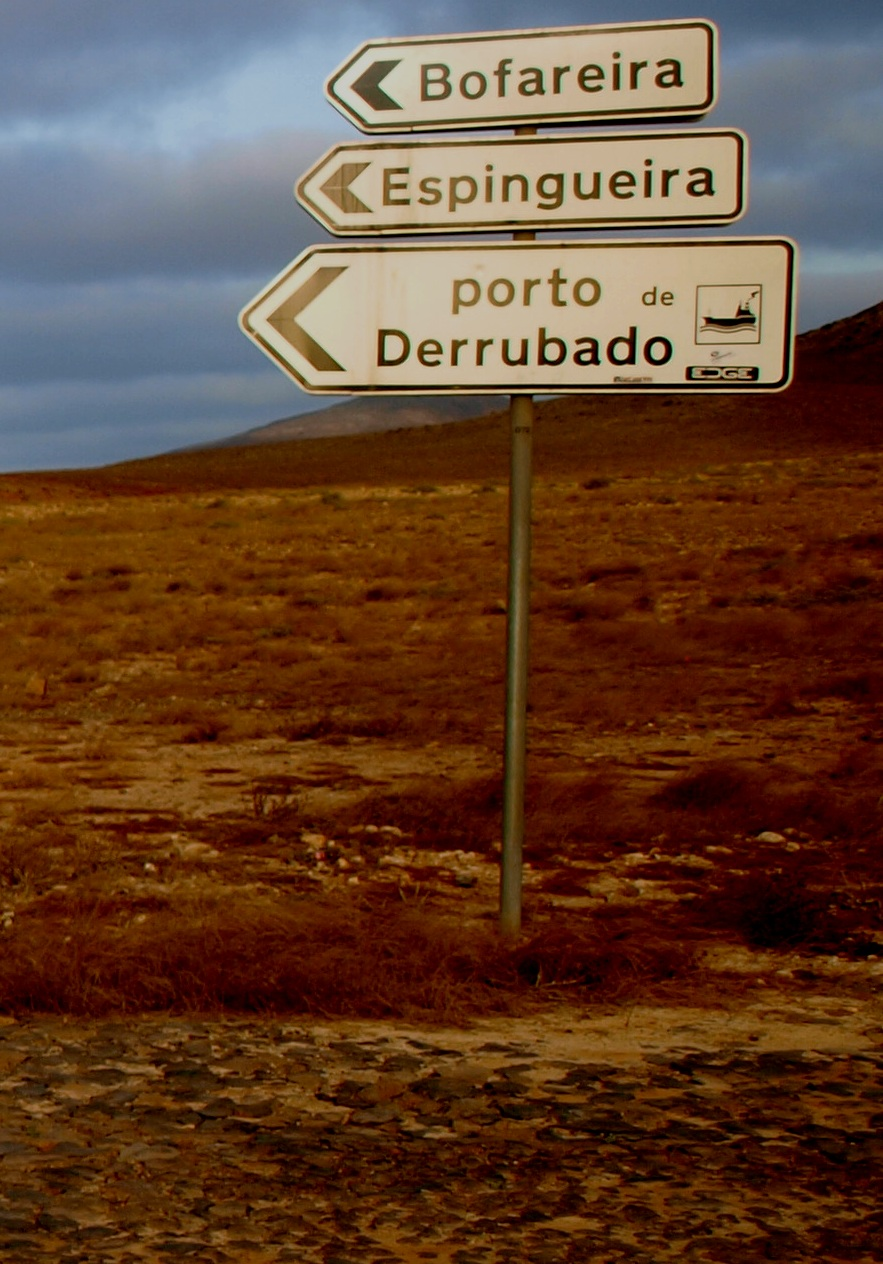
Sign in the vicinity of Espingueira

Espingueira was an abandoned village near the northern coast of the island of Boa Vista. The village is around 4 km (2.5 mi) northeast of the village Bofarreira and 13 km (8.1 mi) east of the island capital of Sal Rei.

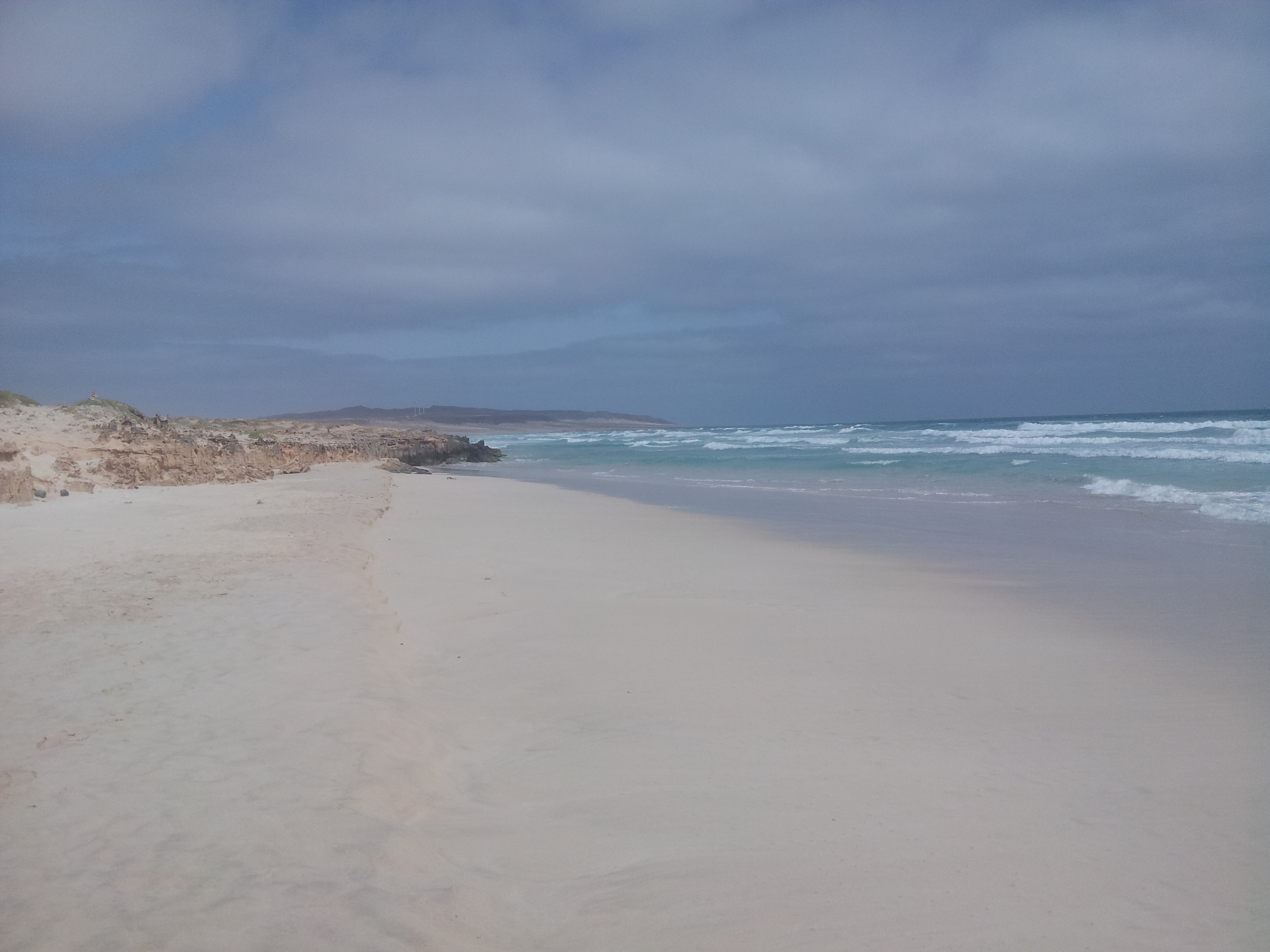
Praia de Espingueira

The village has been refurbished and is now an eco-lodge, where electricity is provided by a photovoltaic power plant (10 kW).

== See also ==
- List of villages and settlements in Cape Verde
