= Chã de Pedras =

- Settlement
- Coordinates: 17.1244°N 25.1131°W
- Country: Cape Verde
- Island: Santo Antão
- Municipality: Ribeira Grande
- Civil parish: Santo Crucifixo

Population (2010)
  - Total: 1,266
- ID: 11305

Chã de Pedras is a settlement in the northcentral part of the island of Santo Antão, Cape Verde. In 2010 its population was 1,266. It is situated about 5 km south of Coculi, 8 km southeast of the city Ribeira Grande and 12 km northwest of the island capital Porto Novo. It consists of 21 localities in the valley of the Ribeira de Chã de Pedras, a right tributary of the Ribeira Grande. The elevation of the largest village, Pia de Cima, is about 430 metres.

== See also ==
- List of villages and settlements in Cape Verde
