= São João Baptista (Boa Vista) =

- Civil parish
- Coordinates: 16.14°N 22.73°W
- Country: Cape Verde
- Island: Boa Vista
- Municipality: Boa Vista

Population (2010)
  - Total: 639
- ID: 511

São João Baptista (Portuguese meaning Saint John the Baptist) is a freguesia (civil parish) of Cape Verde. It covers the eastern part of the island of Boa Vista. It is named after the church located in Fundo das Figueiras.

== Subdivisions ==
The freguesia consists of the following settlements:

- Cabeça dos Tarrafes
- Fundo das Figueiras
- João Galego
