= Ribeira da Vinha =

- Settlement
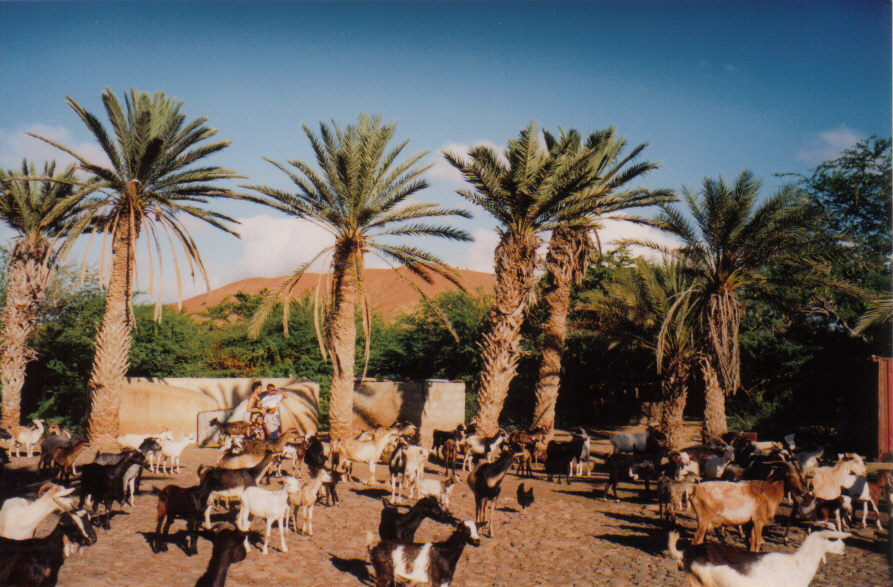
- Quinta de Nha Maria

- Location within Cape Verde
- Coordinates: 16.860°N 25.002°W
- Country: Cape Verde
- Island: São Vicente
- Municipality: São Vicente
- Civil parish: Nossa Senhora da Luz

Population (2010)
  - Total: 504
- ID: 21104

Ribeira da Vinha is a village in the central part of the island of Sao Vicente, Cape Verde. It is situated in the plain southwest of the island capital Mindelo, approximately 3 km from the city centre.
