= Corda, Ribeira Grande =

Corda
- Settlement
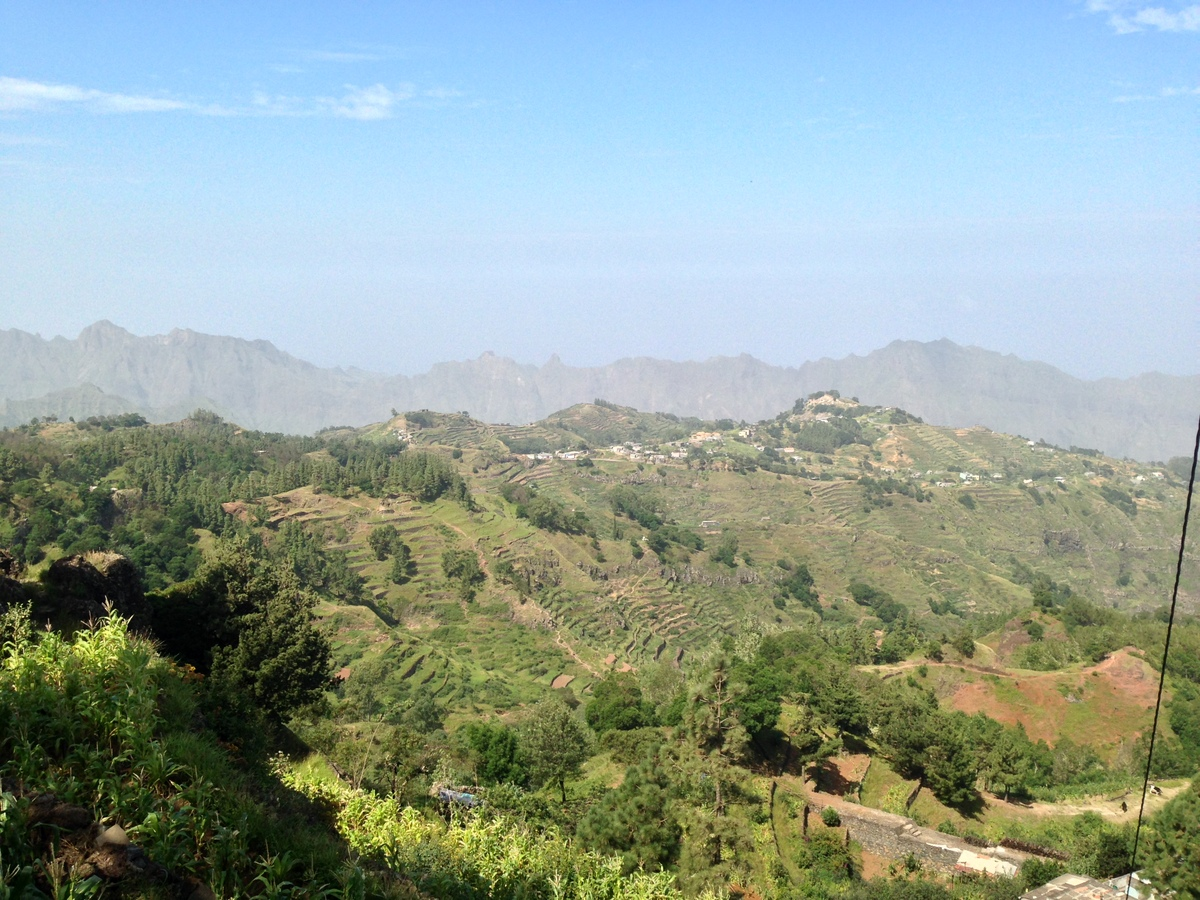
- The center of the village with the northernmost mountains of the island

- Location within Cape Verde
- Coordinates: 17.136°N 25.088°W
- Country: Cape Verde
- Island: Santo Antão
- Municipality: Ribeira Grande
- Civil parish: Santo Crucifixo

Population (2010)
  - Total: 833
- ID: 11307

Corda is a settlement in the island of Santo Antão, Cape Verde. It is part of the municipality Ribeira Grande. It is situated in the mountainous interior of the island at about 1,000 meters elevation, 13 km north of the island capital Porto Novo. Corda consists of several villages, including Chã de Corda and Esponjeiro. The national road from Porto Novo to Ribeira Grande (EN1-SA01) passes through Corda. The crater of Cova lies 4 km to the southeast. Corda lies in the Cova-Paul-Ribeira da Torre Natural Park.

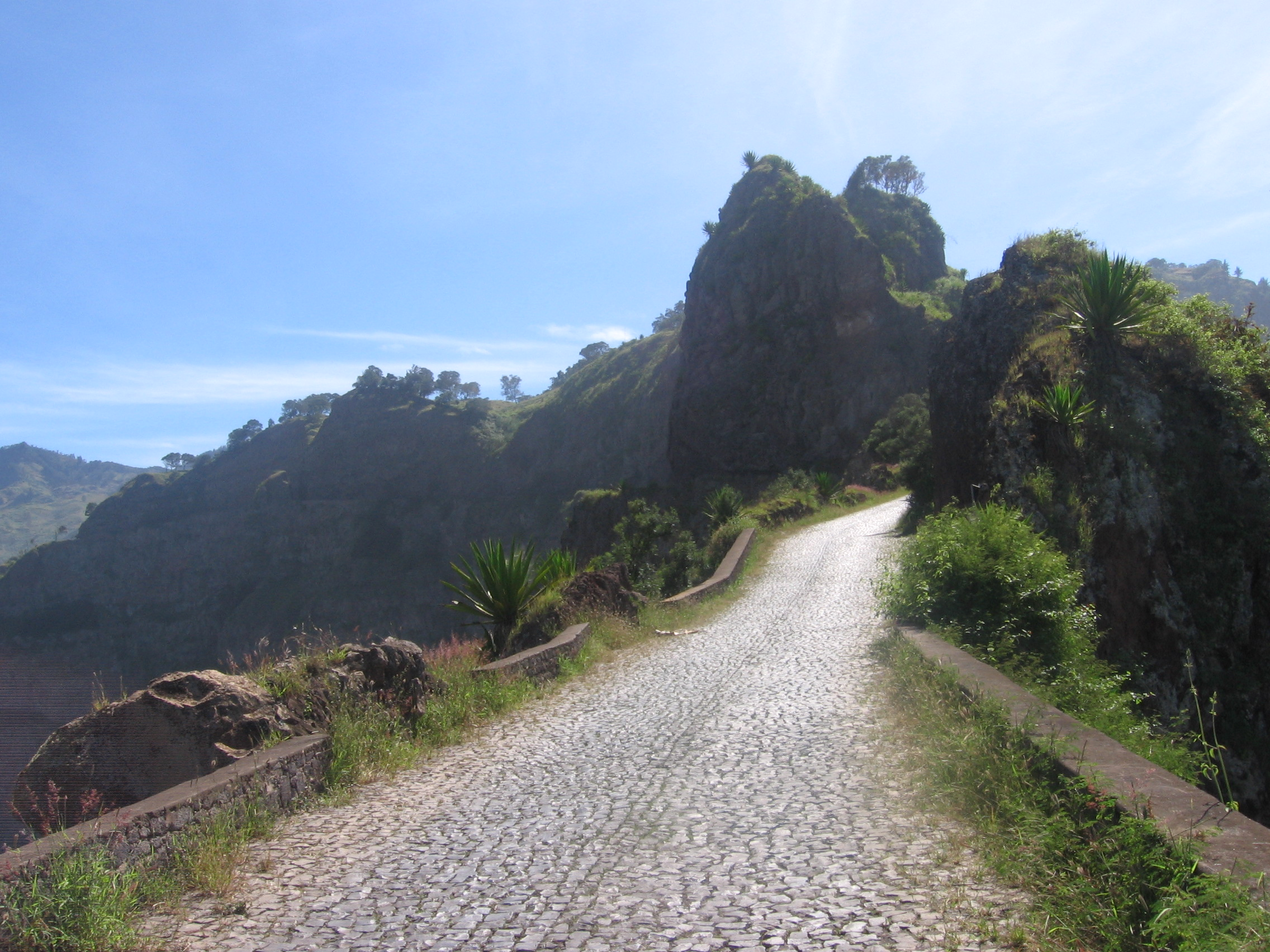
Estrada da Corda runs in the area of the settlement

Two species of cuckoo bees, Thyreus batelkai and Chiasmognathus batelkai, have been found near Esponjeiro. Also a subspecies of butterflies, Leptotes pirithous capvertis has been found near Esponjeiro.

== Climate data ==
Esponjeiro (south of Corda) has a steppe climate. The annual rainfall is 351 millimeters. The average annual temperature is 15.1 °C (59.2 °F).

Climate data for Esponjeiro, 1371 metres ASL
| Month | Jan | Feb | Mar | Apr | May | Jun | Jul | Aug | Sep | Oct | Nov | Dec | Year |
|---|---|---|---|---|---|---|---|---|---|---|---|---|---|
| Mean daily maximum °C (°F) | 15.5 (59.9) | 15.3 (59.5) | 15.9 (60.6) | 16.3 (61.3) | 17.2 (63.0) | 17.9 (64.2) | 19.0 (66.2) | 20.0 (68.0) | 20.3 (68.5) | 19.8 (67.6) | 18.5 (65.3) | 16.5 (61.7) | 17.7 (63.9) |
| Daily mean °C (°F) | 13.2 (55.8) | 12.8 (55.0) | 13.2 (55.8) | 13.6 (56.5) | 14.5 (58.1) | 15.3 (59.5) | 16.3 (61.3) | 17.3 (63.1) | 17.7 (63.9) | 17.4 (63.3) | 16.0 (60.8) | 14.4 (57.9) | 15.1 (59.2) |
| Mean daily minimum °C (°F) | 10.9 (51.6) | 10.4 (50.7) | 10.6 (51.1) | 10.9 (51.6) | 11.9 (53.4) | 12.8 (55.0) | 13.7 (56.7) | 14.7 (58.5) | 15.1 (59.2) | 15.0 (59.0) | 13.6 (56.5) | 12.3 (54.1) | 12.7 (54.9) |
| Average rainfall mm (inches) | 24 (0.9) | 4 (0.2) | 4 (0.2) | 1 (0.0) | 0 (0) | 0 (0) | 20 (0.8) | 82 (3.2) | 105 (4.1) | 55 (2.2) | 31 (1.2) | 25 (1.0) | 351 (13.8) |
Source: Climate-Data.ORG
