= Preguiça, São Nicolau =

Preguiça
- Settlement
- Coordinates: 16.562°N 24.281°W
- Country: Cape Verde
- Island: São Nicolau
- Municipality: Ribeira Brava
- Civil parish: Nossa Senhora do Rosário

Population (2010)
  - Total: 567
- ID: 31224

Preguiça is a settlement in the central part of the island of São Nicolau, Cape Verde. It is situated on the south coast, 6 km south of Ribeira Brava. It served as the port of Ribeira Brava, after the older Porto de Lapa, 6 km to the northeast, had been abandoned in 1653 due to pirate attacks. The settlement was mentioned as Paraghisi in the 1747 map by Jacques-Nicolas Bellin. In 1820 the Forte do Príncipe Real, now ruined, was built to protect the port. Preguiça's port consists of a stone quay and a short mole. Preguiça Airport is located 3 km north of the village.

== Population history ==
- 2000: 465
- 2010: 567

== See also ==
- List of villages and settlements in Cape Verde
