= Fundo das Figueiras =

- Settlement
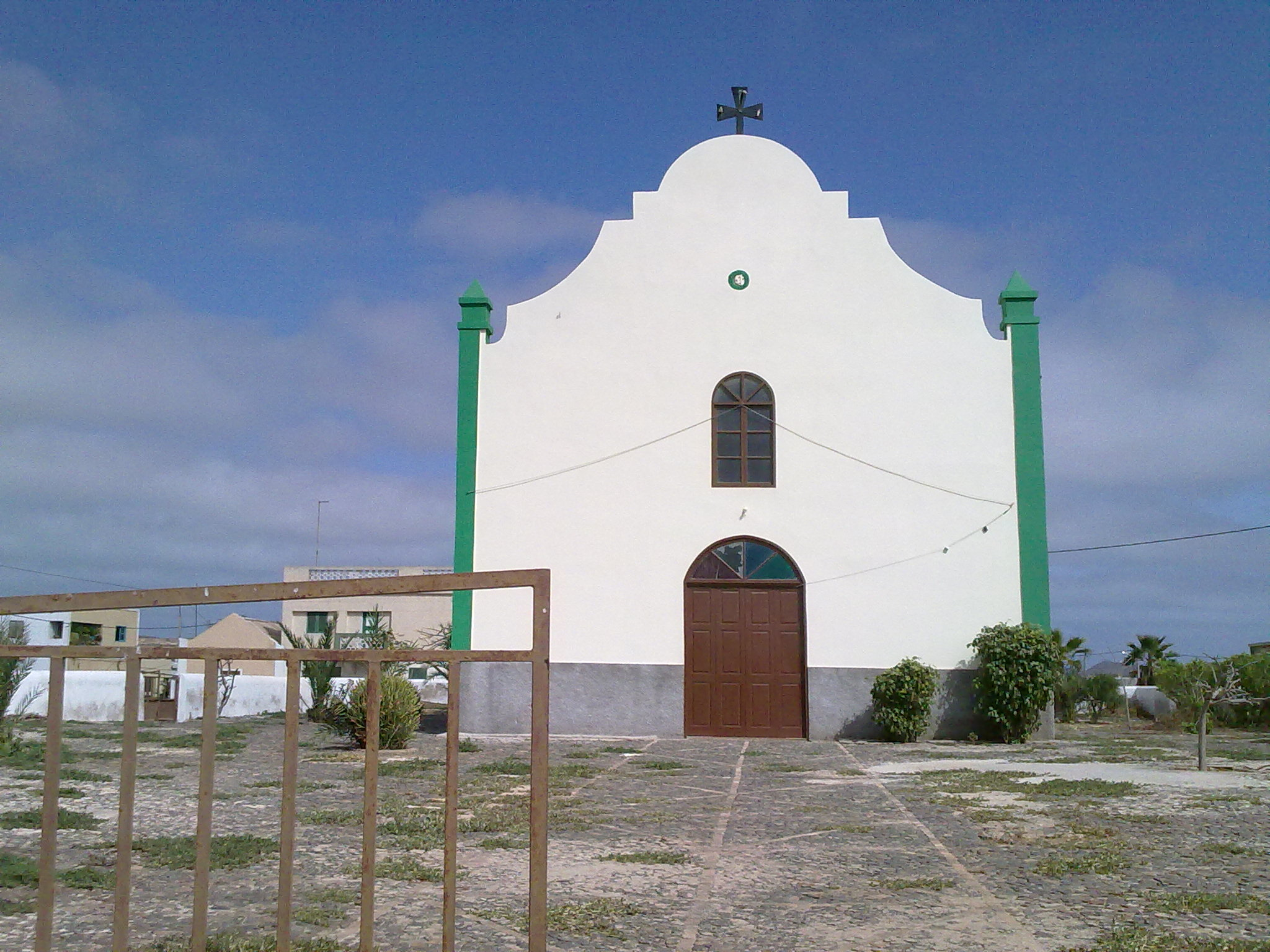
- Church of Saint John Baptist

- Location within Cape Verde
- Coordinates: 16.139°N 22.725°W
- Country: Cape Verde
- Island: Boa Vista
- Municipality: Boa Vista
- Civil parish: São João Baptista
- Elevation: 16 m (52 ft)

Population (2010)
  - Total: 241
- Postal code: 5129
- ID: 51102

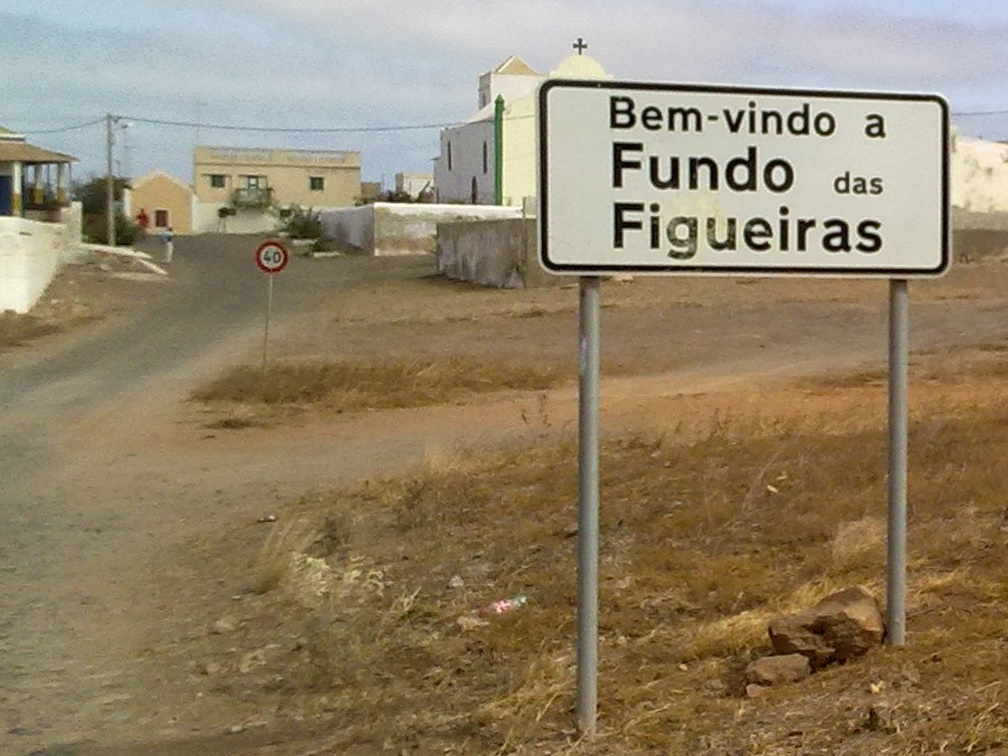
Welcome sign at Fundo das Figueiras

Fundo das Figueiras is a village in the eastern part of the island of Boa Vista. The village is around 21 km east of the island capital of Sal Rei. It is the seat of the civil parish of São João Baptista. 2 km to the south is the village Cabeça dos Tarrafes and 8 km southeast is Ponta Meringuel, the easternmost point in Cape Verde.

The village has a church of Saint John Baptist (São João Baptista). Since 2008, an NGO has been active protecting turtle egg laying sites on the Porto Ferreira beach, east of Fundo das Figueiras.

== See also ==
- List of villages and settlements in Cape Verde
