= Coculi =

- Settlement
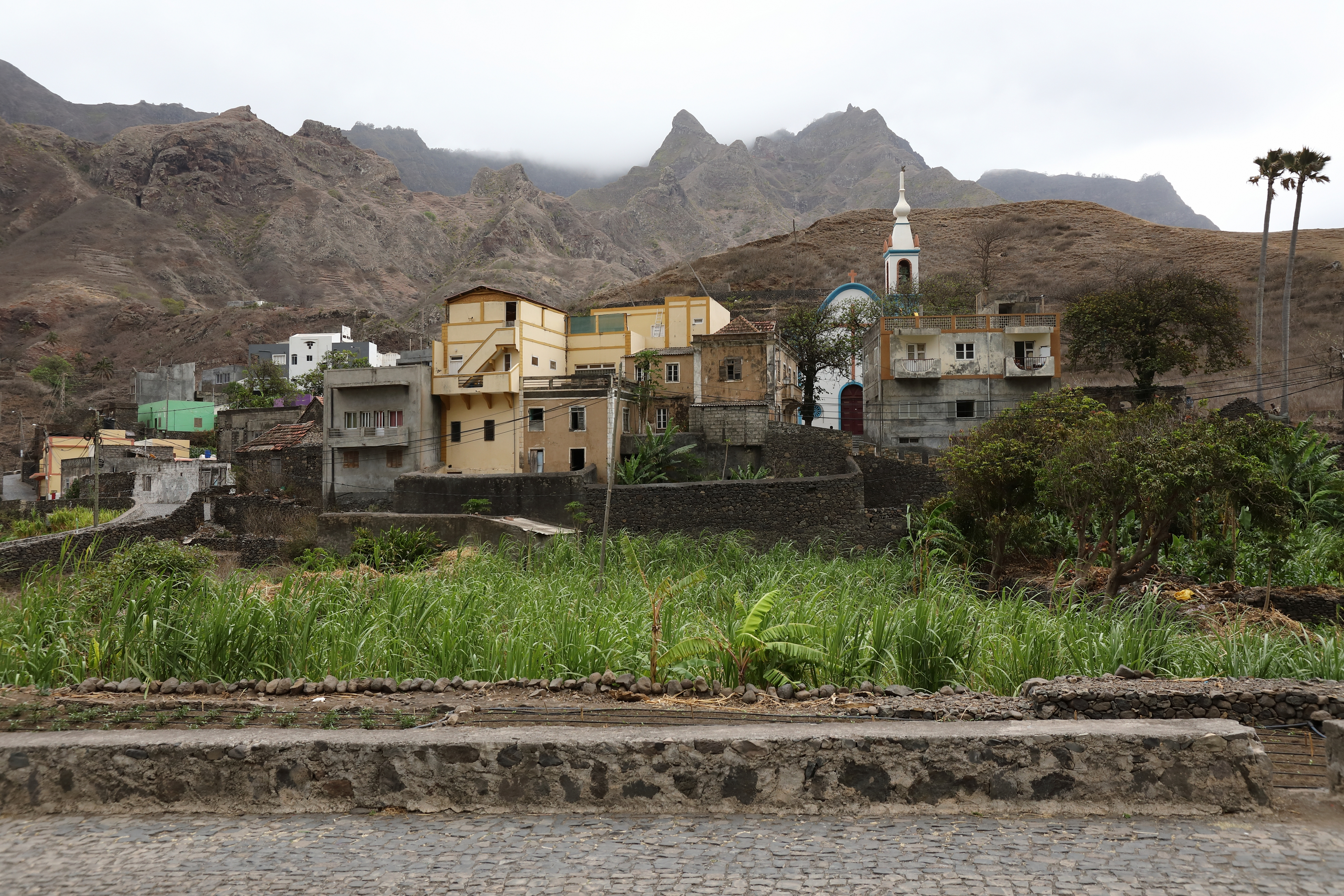

- Location within Cape Verde
- Coordinates: 17.165°N 25.098°W
- Country: Cape Verde
- Island: Santo Antão
- Municipality: Ribeira Grande
- Civil parish: Santo Crucifixo

Population (2010)
  - Total: 901
- ID: 11306

Coculi is a town in the northern part of the island of Santo Antão, Cape Verde. It is situated on the river Ribeira Grande, 4 km southwest of the town Ribeira Grande and 17 km north of the island capital Porto Novo. About 400 meters to its west is the confluence of Ribeira de Chã das Pedras.

== See also ==
- List of cities and towns in Cape Verde
