= Ribeira Grande (stream) =

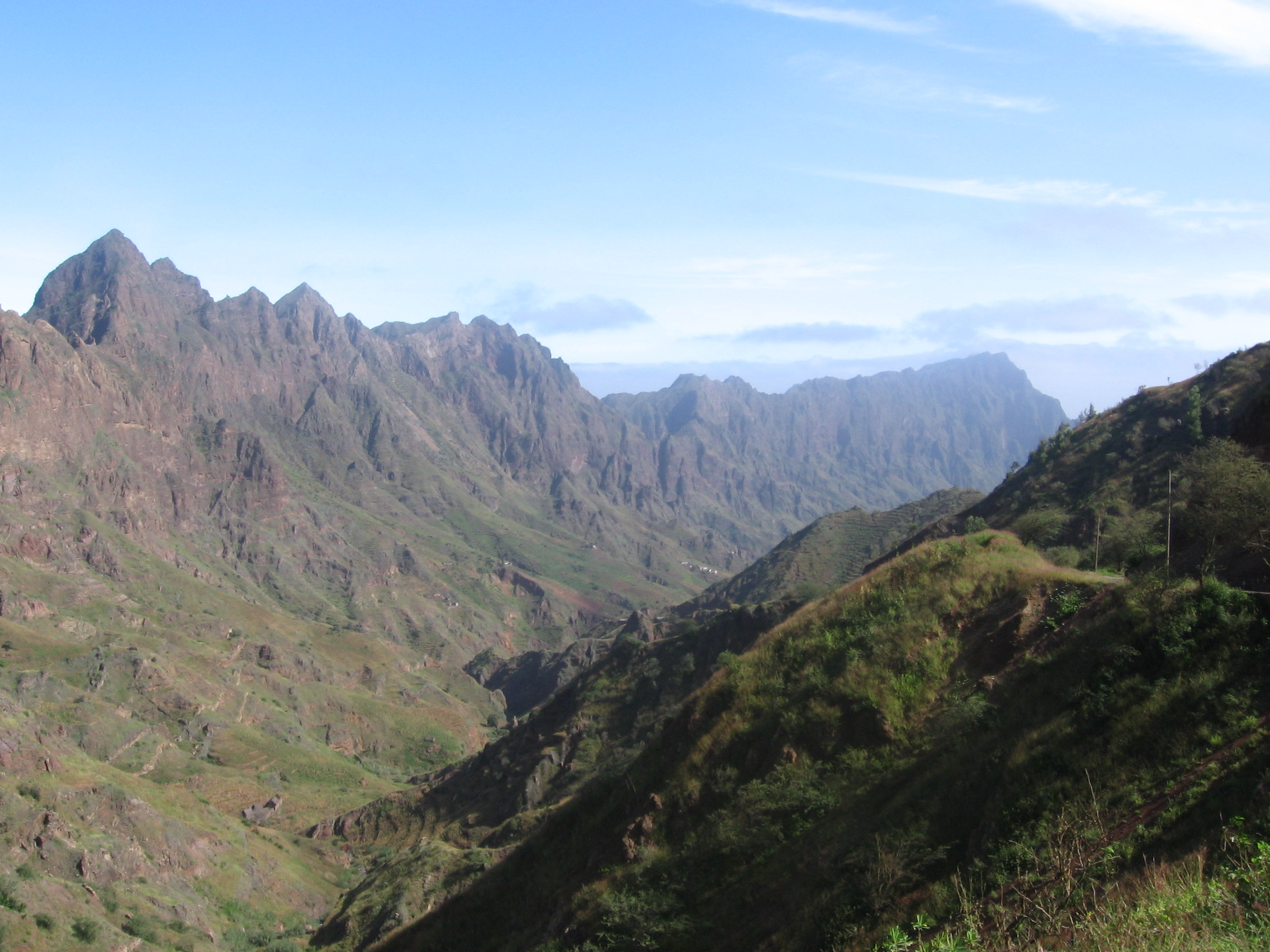

Location
- Country: Cape Verde

Physical characteristics
- Source
  - location: Santo Antão
- Mouth
  - location: Atlantic Ocean
  - coordinates: 17.1847°N 25.0635°W

Ribeira Grande is a stream in the northeastern part of the island of Santo Antão in Cape Verde. The stream flows from west-southwest to east-northeast, through a steep and narrow gorge. The river begins near Lombo Santa, passes through Boca de Ambas Ribeiras, Boca de Coruja and Coculi, and flows into the Atlantic Ocean at the town of Ribeira Grande. Its most important tributaries are the Ribeira de Chã das Pedras (confluence near Coculi), and the Ribeira da Torre, that joins the Ribeira Grande in the town Ribeira Grande.

== See also ==
- List of streams in Cape Verde
