= Tarrafal de São Nicolau (municipality) =

Municipality of Cape Verde

- Municipality
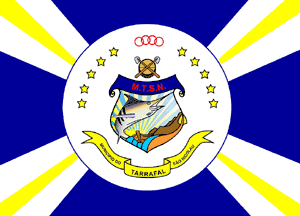
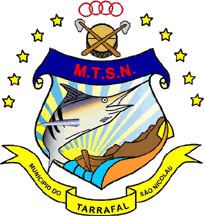
- Flag Seal

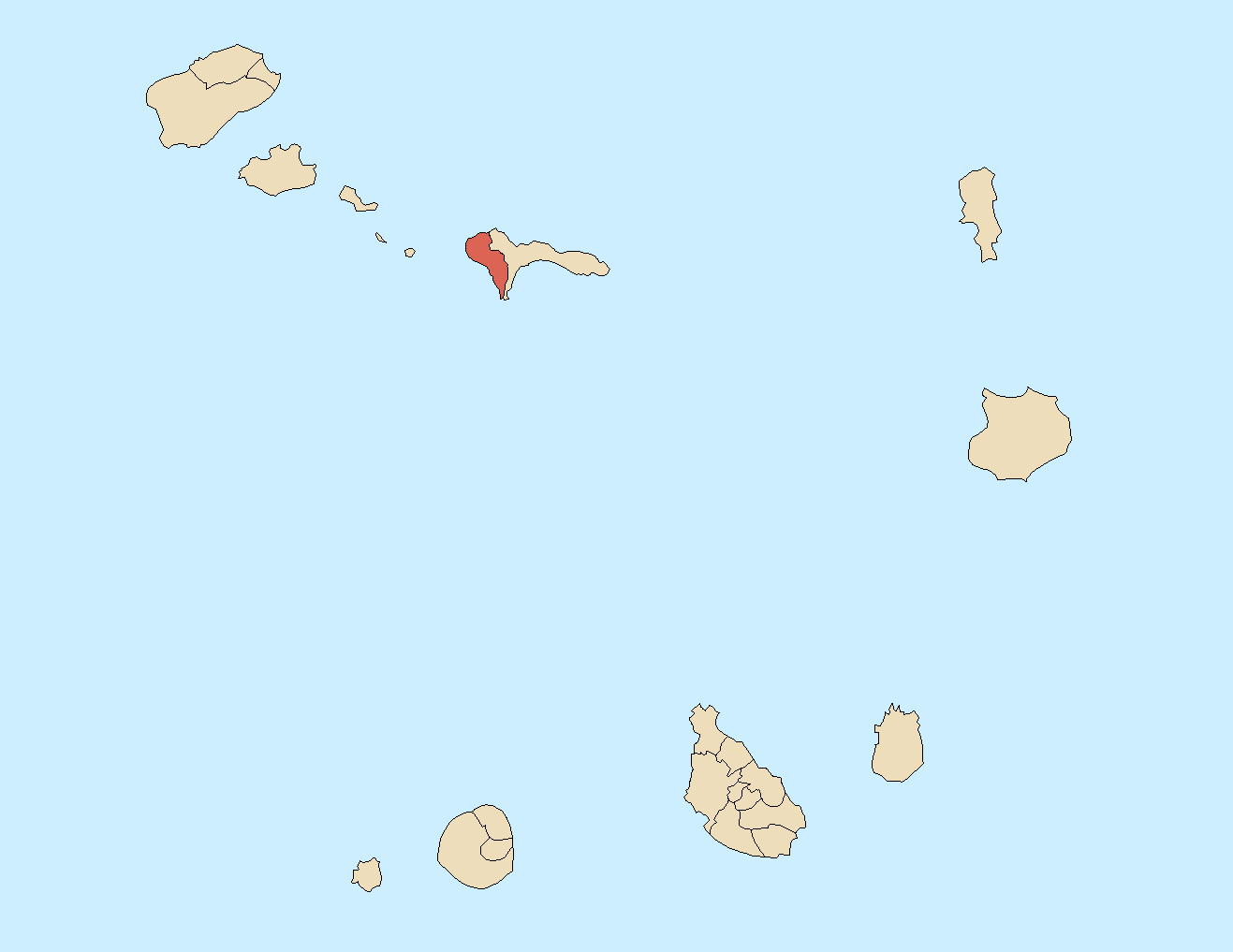
- Coordinates: 16.60°N 24.35°W
- Country: Cape Verde
- Island: São Nicolau

Area
  - Total: 119.8 km^{2} (46.3 sq mi)

Population (2010)
  - Total: 5,237
  - Density: 43.71/km^{2} (113.2/sq mi)
- ID: 32

Tarrafal de São Nicolau is a concelho (municipality) of Cape Verde. Situated in the western part of the island of São Nicolau, it covers 35% of the island area (119.8 km^{2}) and is home to 41% of its population (5,237 at the 2010 census). Its seat is the town Tarrafal de São Nicolau.

== Subdivisions ==
The municipality consists of one freguesia (civil parish), São Francisco de Assis. The freguesia is subdivided into the following settlements (population at the 2010 census):

- Cabeçalinho (pop: 155)
- Fragata (pop: 172)
- Hortelã (pop: 181)
- Palhal (pop: 100)
- Praia Branca (pop: 521, town)
- Ribeira dos Calhaus
- Ribeira Prata (pop: 343)
- Tarrafal de São Nicolau (pop: 3,733, city)

== History ==
The municipality was created in 2005, when the older municipality of São Nicolau was split in two, the western part becoming the Municipality of Tarrafal de São Nicolau and the eastern part becoming the Municipality of Ribeira Brava.

== Demography ==
Population of Tarrafal de São Nicolau (1980—2010)
Year	Population
1980	2,107
1990	2,109
2000	1,853
2010	5,237

== Politics ==
Since 2012, the Movement for Democracy (MpD) is the ruling party of the municipality. The results of the latest elections, in 2016:

Party	Municipal Council		Municipal Assembly	
Party	Votes%	Seats	Votes%	Seats
MpD	55.90	5	55.78	8
PAICV	40.63	0	40.30	5

== Twin town ==
Tarrafal de São Nicolau is twinned with:

- (Italy) Fiuggi
