= Praia Branca =

- Settlement
- Coordinates: 16.642°N 24.386°W
- Country: Cape Verde
- Island: São Nicolau
- Municipality: Tarrafal de São Nicolau
- Civil parish: São Francisco de Assis

Population (2010)
  - Total: 521
- ID: 32106

Praia Branca is a town in the northwestern part of the island of São Nicolau, Cape Verde. It is part of the municipality of Tarrafal de São Nicolau. Its population at the 2010 census was 521. It is situated 2 kilometres (1.2 mi) from the coast, 10 kilometres (6.2 mi) northwest of Ribeira Brava.

== Notable person ==
Singer Armando Zeferino Soares was native to Praia Branca.

== See also ==
- List of cities and towns in Cape Verde
