= Monte Gordo (Cape Verde) =

Mountain in Cape Verde

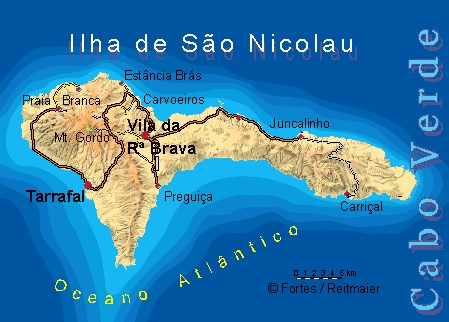
- Location of Monte Gordo in the island of São Nicolau displayed on the left

Highest point
- Elevation: 1,312 m (4,304 ft)
- Prominence: 1,312 m (4,304 ft)
- Listing: List of mountains in Cape Verde; Ribu
- Coordinates: 16°37′15″N 24°21′15″W

Geography
- Location within Cape Verde
- Location: western São Nicolau

Monte Gordo is a mountain on the island of São Nicolau, Cape Verde. At 1,312 m elevation, it is the island's highest point. It is situated in the western part of the island, 6 km west of the island capital Ribeira Brava. The mountain is of volcanic origin, less than 1 million years old. The boundary of the municipalities Tarrafal de São Nicolau and Ribeira Brava runs over the mountain. It is part of the Monte Gordo Natural Park.

== Monte Gordo Natural Park ==
Monte Gordo Natural Park
- IUCN category V (protected landscape/seascape)
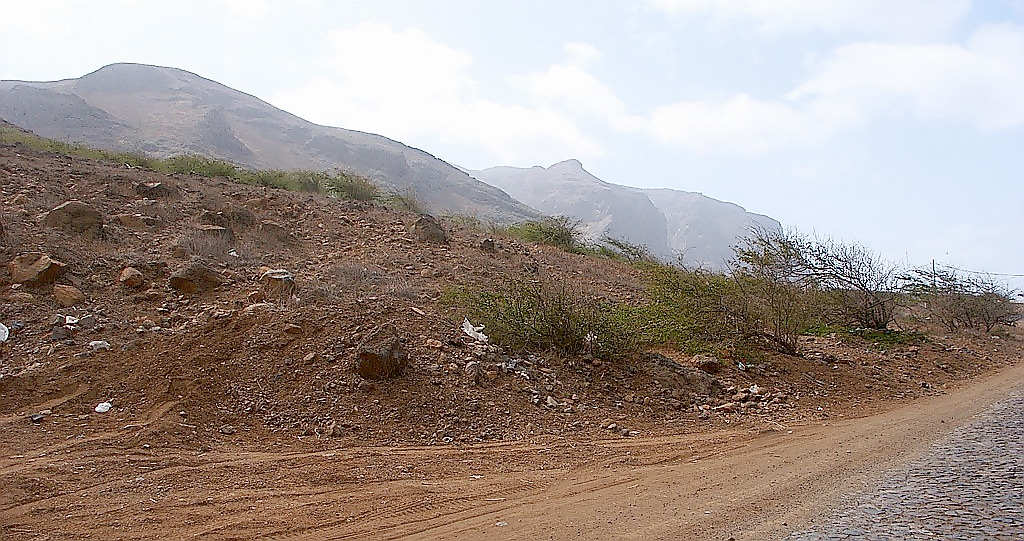
- Interactive map of Monte Gordo Natural Park
- Area: 9.52 km^{2} (3.68 sq mi)
- Created: 24 February 2003

The Monte Gordo Natural Park (Portuguese: Parque Natural de Monte Gordo)) has been created to protect the typical humid mountain ecosystem. It was established on February 24, 2003, and is category V by the IUCN, The park area is 9.52 km^{2}. It is one of the few places in Cape Verde where the original vegetation has been preserved. Some of the higher parts of the site are forested, especially around Monte Gordo where relatively high rainfall and frequent misty conditions cause the trees to be thickly covered with lichens.

The dominant vegetation in the park is forests of Pinus, Eucalyptus and Cupressus species. Endemic plant species include Euphorbia tuckeyana, Nauplius smithii, Echium stenosiphon, Sonchus daltonii, Aeonium gorgoneum and Campanula jacobaea. Fauna includes the Chioninia nicolauensis (São Nicolau skink), Cape Verde wall gecko (Tarentola caboverdiana), Fea's petrel (Pterodroma feae) and Cape Verde warbler (Acrocephalus brevipennis). The site has been identified as an Important Bird Area by BirdLife International.

== See also ==
- List of mountains in Cape Verde
