= Tarrafal de São Nicolau, Cape Verde =

Tarrafal de São Nicolau
- Settlement
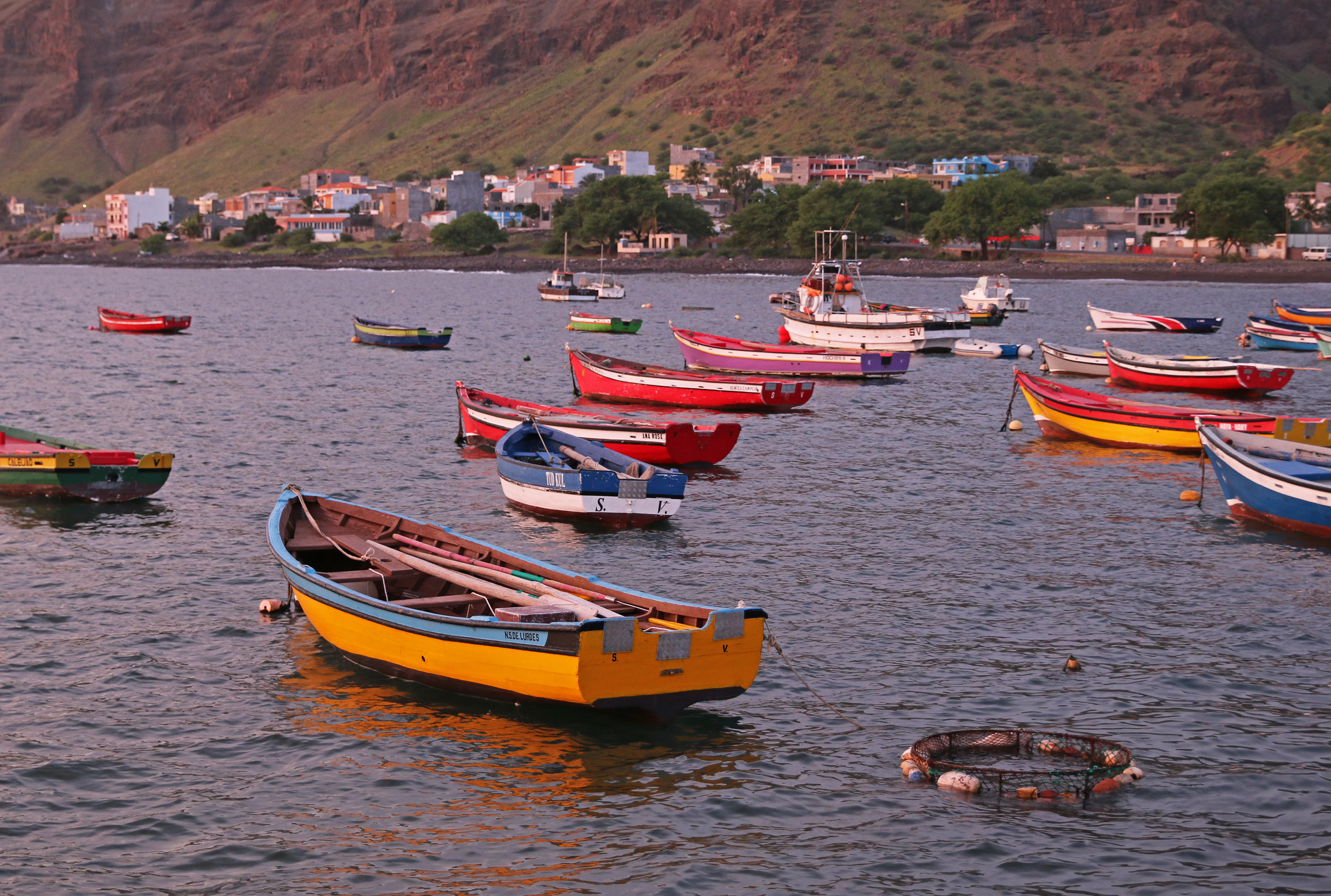
- Town of Tarrafal de São Nicolau with its harbor and its boats

- Location within Cape Verde
- Coordinates: 16.566°N 24.357°W
- Country: Cape Verde
- Island: São Nicolau
- Municipality: Tarrafal de São Nicolau
- Civil parish: São Francisco de Assis

Population (2010)
  - Total: 3,733
- Postal code: 3121
- ID: 32109

Tarrafal de São Nicolau is a city in the western part of the island of São Nicolau, Cape Verde. With a population of 3,733 (2010 census), it is the most populous settlement of the island. It is the seat of the Tarrafal de São Nicolau Municipality, and the main port of the island. It is situated on the west coast, 9 km southwest of Ribeira Brava.

== Subdivisions ==
The city is divided into neighborhoods (bairros) including:

- Alto Fontaínhas
- Alto Saco
- Amarelo Pintado
- Campedrada
- Chã de Poça
- João Baptista
- Telha

== History ==
Before the 19th century, the roadstead of Tarrafal was little used because it was far from the main settlement of the island, Ribeira Brava. It was mentioned as Terrafal in the 1747 map by Jacques-Nicolas Bellin. It became an anchorage for whaling ships in the 19th century, and fish processing infrastructure was built, leading to further growth of the settlement. The settlement became a town in the early 1990s and a city in 2010.

== Transport ==
The port of Tarrafal was constructed in 1991. It has 2 quays and a roll-on/roll-off ramp and a passenger terminal. The total length of the quays is 137 m, and the maximum depth is 7 m. There are ferry connections from Tarrafal to the islands of São Vicente (Mindelo) and Santiago (Praia). Porto Tarrafal is a member port of the International Association of Ports and Harbors (IAPH).

== See also ==
- List of villages and settlements in Cape Verde
