= São Nicolau, Cape Verde =

Island of Cape Verde

São Nicolau
Native name: Saniclau Nickname: Ilha de Chiquinho
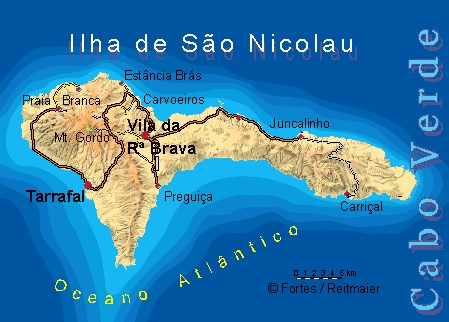

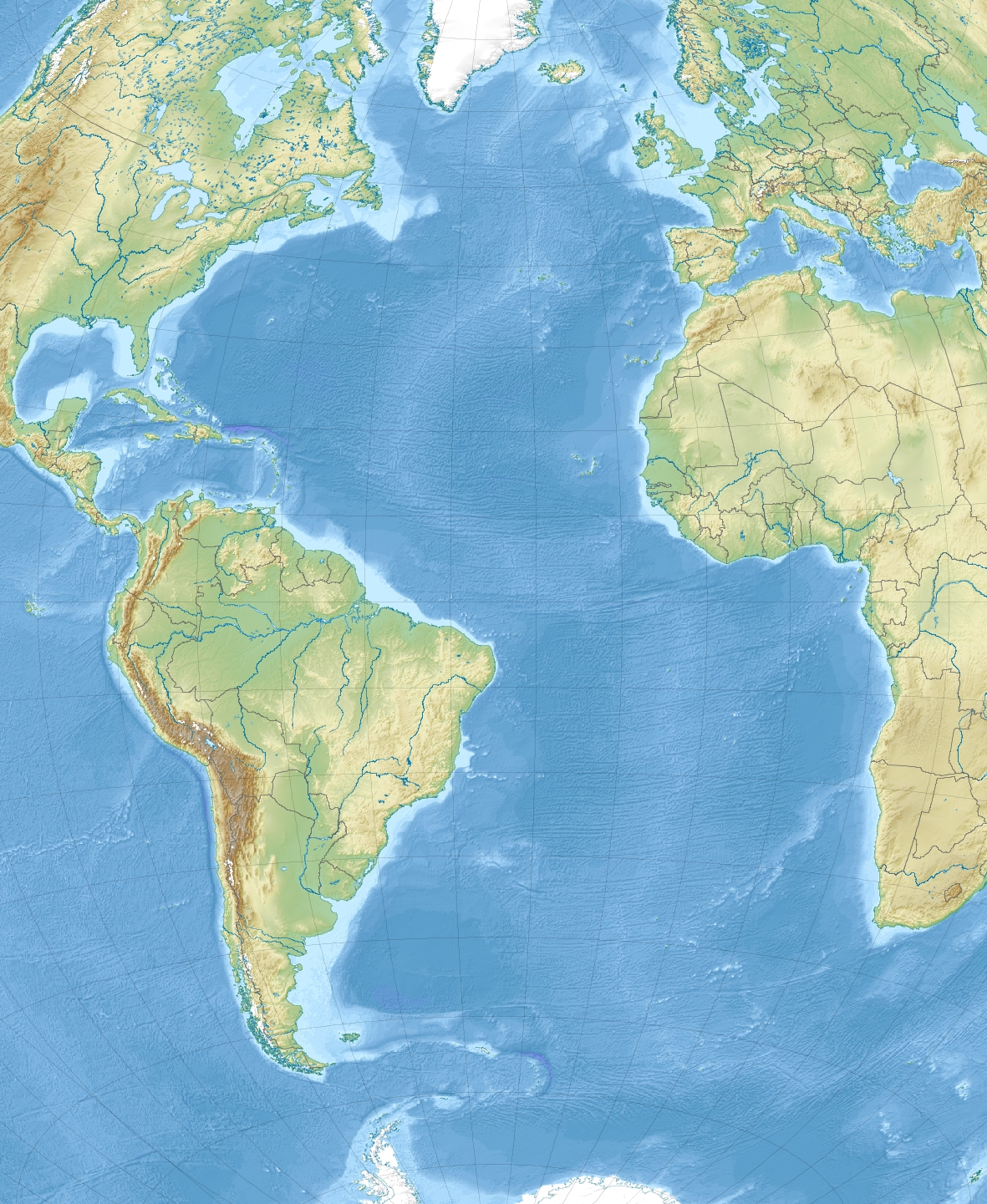
- Location within Cape Verde Location within Atlantic Ocean

Geography
- Location: Atlantic Ocean
- Coordinates: 16.615°N 24.271°W
- Area: 343 km^{2} (132 sq mi)
- Length: 44.5 km (27.65 mi)
- Width: 22.0 km (13.67 mi)
- Highest elevation: 1,312 m (4304 ft)
- Highest point: Monte Gordo

Administration
- Cape Verde
- Concelhos (Municipalities): Ribeira Brava, Tarrafal de São Nicolau
- Largest settlement: Ribeira Brava

Demographics
- Population: 12,424 (2015)
- Pop. density: 36.2/km^{2} (93.8/sq mi)

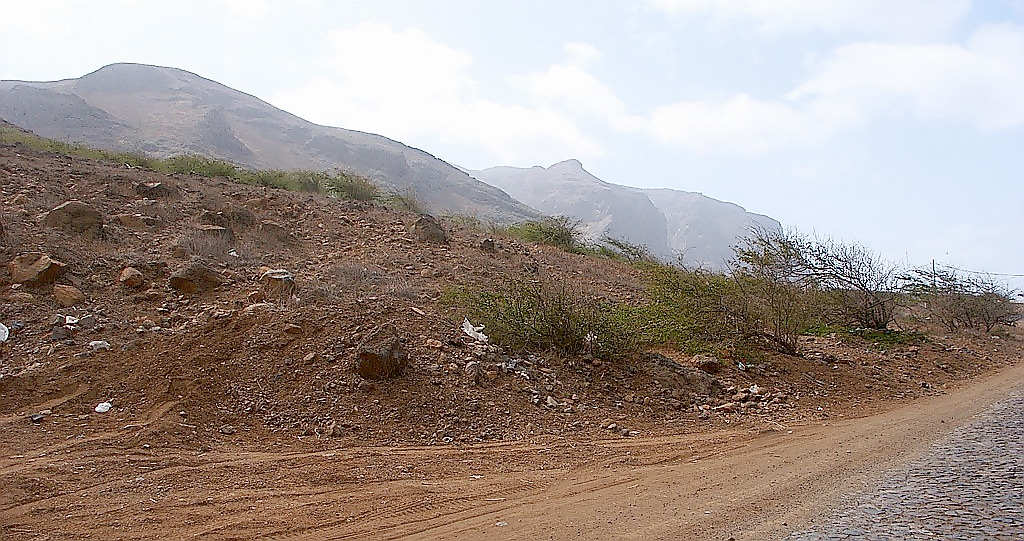
A cobblestone-paved road with the view of the island's mountain.

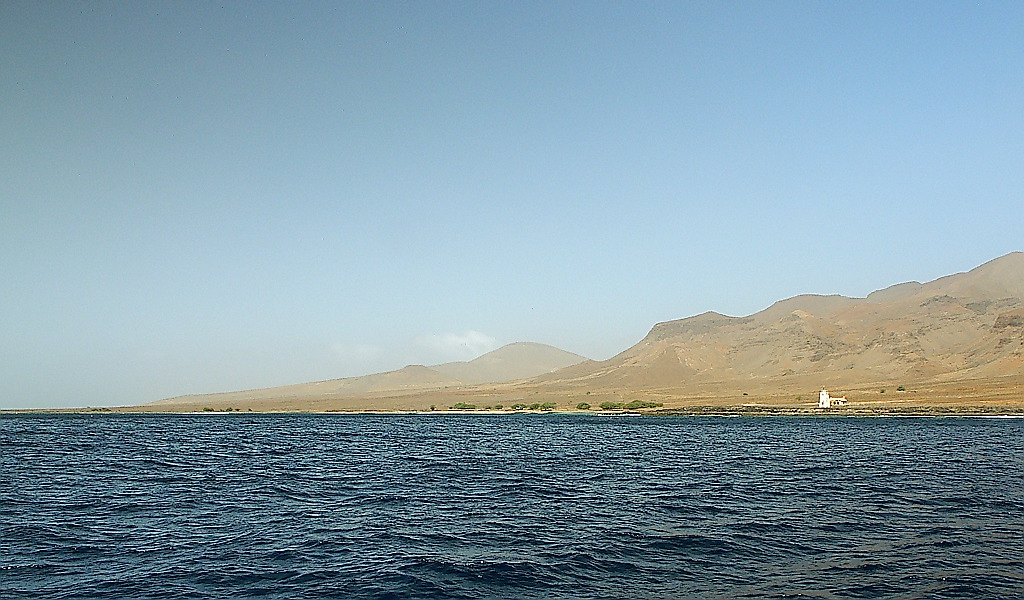
Coast of the island of São Nicolau

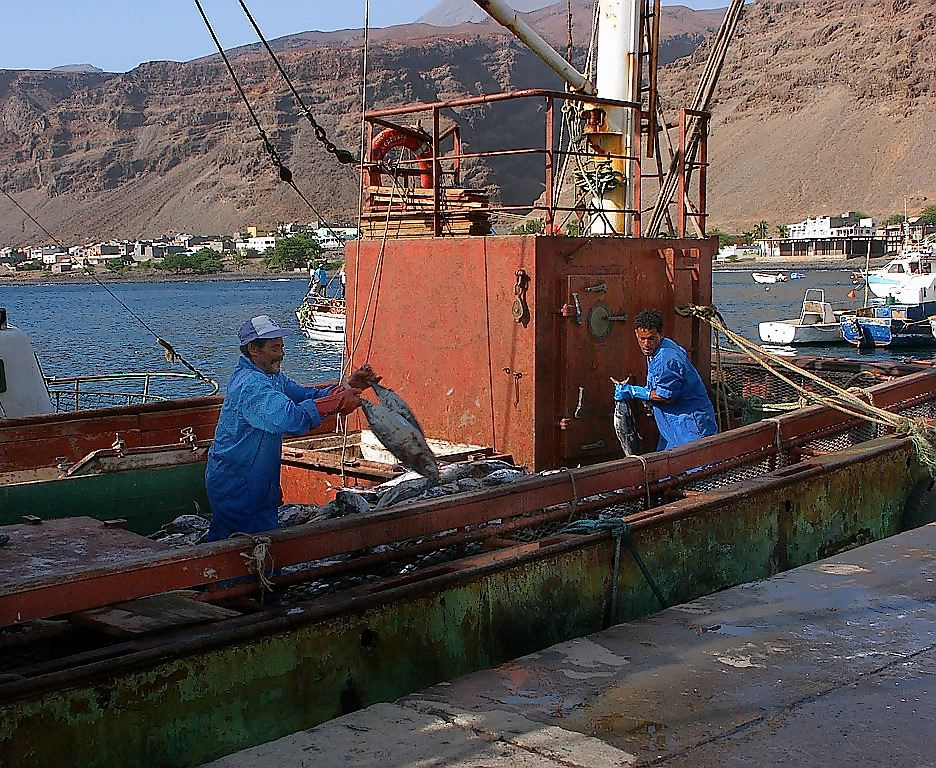
Tarrafal de São Nicolau fishing boat

São Nicolau (Portuguese for Saint Nicholas) is one of the Barlavento (Windward) islands of Cape Verde. It is located between the islands of Santa Luzia and Sal. Its population is 12,424 (2015), with an area of 343 km^{2} (132 sq mi). The main towns are Ribeira Brava and Tarrafal de São Nicolau.

== History ==
The island was discovered in 1461 or 1462 by Diogo Afonso, together with the islands of São Vicente and Santo Antão. It was first settled in the seventeenth century. The settlement Porto de Lapa was abandoned in 1653 due to pirate attacks, and the town Ribeira Brava was founded in the interior. It was the seat of the Roman Catholic Diocese of Santiago de Cabo Verde between 1786 and 1943. The roadstead of Tarrafal de São Nicolau became an anchorage for whaling ships in the 19th century. It is now the largest settlement of the island.

== Geography ==
The mountainous island is mostly agricultural but is subject to droughts, especially in the lower lying areas. The highest point on the island is Monte Gordo (1,312 m), in the western half of the island. The eastern part is a chain of lower mountains, including Monte Bissau and Pico de Alberto.

== Administrative divisions ==
The island is divided in two municipalities, which are subdivided into civil parishes:

- Ribeira Brava
  - Nossa Senhora da Lapa
  - Nossa Senhora do Rosário
- Tarrafal de São Nicolau
  - São Francisco de Assis

Before 2005, the island was administrated as one municipality: São Nicolau.

== Demography ==
In the 1830s, São Nicolau had an estimated population of 5,000.

Population of São Nicolau (1940—2015)
Year	Population
1940	14,846
1950	10,366
1960	13,866
1970	16,308
1980	13,572
1990	13,665
2000	13,536
2010	12,817
2015	12,424

== Transportation ==
The island has a domestic airport, São Nicolau Airport, located between Ribeira Brava and Preguiça. There is a port at Tarrafal de São Nicolau, with ferry connections to the islands of São Vicente (Mindelo) and Santiago (Praia).

== Notable residents ==
- Cesária Évora (1941-2011), famed musician
- Teofilo Chantre (b. 1964), musician
- Baltasar Lopes da Silva (1907 - 1989), writer
- José Lopes da Silva (pseudonym: Gabrial Mariano, (1928–2003), poet and essayist
- Antónia Pusich, Portuguese poet, journalist, pianist and compositor of Croatian origin, daughter of the colonial governor António Pusich
- António Maria de Bettencourt Rodrigues (1854-1933), doctor, diplomat and politician
