= San Antonio (disambiguation) =

San Antonio is the seventh-most populous city in the United States and the second-most populous in the state of Texas.

San Antonio may also refer to:

== Places ==
=== Argentina ===
- San Antonio, Arauco, a municipality and village in La Rioja Province
- San Antonio de Areco, a city in Buenos Aires Province
- Cape San Antonio, Argentina, a cape on the eastern coast of Buenos Aires Province
- San Antonio de los Cobres, a town in Salta Province
- San Antonio, Fray Mamerto Esquiú, a municipality in Catamarca Province
- San Antonio, General Juan Facundo Quiroga, a municipality and village in La Rioja Province
- San Antonio, Jujuy, a town and municipality in Jujuy Province
- San Antonio, Misiones, a city in Misiones Province
- San Antonio, Santa Fe, a locality in Santa Fe Province
- San Antonio Department, Río Negro
- San Antonio Oeste, a port city in Río Negro Province
- San Antonio, Paclín, a village and municipality in Catamarca Province
- San Antonio de La Paz, a village and municipality in Catamarca Province

=== Belize ===
- San Antonio, a village in Corozal District
- San Antonio, a village in Orange Walk District
- San Antonio, Cayo, a village in the Cayo District
- San Antonio, Toledo, a village in the Toledo District

=== Chile ===
- San Antonio, Chile, the capital of the San Antonio Province
- San Antonio Province, one of eight provinces of the central Chilean region of Valparaíso

=== Colombia ===
- Capilla de San Antonio (Cali), a national monument in Santiago de Cali
- Cerro San Antonio, a town and municipality of the department of Magdalena
- San Antonio, Tolima, a municipality in the department of Tolima
- San Antonio del Tequendama, a municipality and town of the department of Cundinamarca
- San Antonio, Buenaventura, village in Buenaventura Municipality, Valle del Cauca Department
- San Antonio (Medellín), a station on the Medellín Metro, Medellín
- San Antonio, Tolima, a municipality in Colombia

=== Cuba ===
- San Antonio de los Baños, a municipality and town in Artemisa Province
- San Antonio del Sur, a municipality and town in the Guantánamo Province
- Cape San Antonio, Cuba, a cape which forms the western extremity of the Guanahacabibes Peninsula

=== Guatemala ===
- San Antonio Aguas Calientes, a municipality in the department of Sacatepéquez
- San Antonio Huista, a municipality in the department of Huehuetenango
- San Antonio Ilotenango, a municipality in the department of El Quiché
- San Antonio La Paz, a municipality in the department of El Progreso
- San Antonio Palopó, a municipality in the department of Sololá
- San Antonio Sacatepéquez, a municipality in the department of San Marcos
- San Antonio Suchitepéquez, a municipality in the department of Suchitepéquez

=== Honduras ===
- San Antonio de Cortés, a municipality in the department of Cortés Department
- San Antonio, Copán, a municipality in the department of Copán
- San Antonio, Intibucá, a municipality in the department of Intibucá

=== Mexico ===
==== Oaxaca ====
- San Antonio Acutla, a town and municipality in Oaxaca
- San Antonio de la Cal, a town and municipality in Oaxaca
- San Antonio Huitepec, a town and municipality in Oaxaca
- San Antonio Nanahuatipam, a town and municipality in Oaxaca
- San Antonio Sinicahua, a town and municipality in Oaxaca
- San Antonio Tepetlapa, a town and municipality in Oaxaca

==== Other places in Mexico ====
- San Antonio, Baja California Sur, a town in Baja California Sur
- San Antonio la Isla, a town and municipality in the State of Mexico
- San Antonio, San Luis Potosí, a town and municipality in San Luis Potosí
- San Antonio Tecómitl, a city in the Mexico City borough of Milpa Alta
- Unión de San Antonio, Jalisco, a town and municipality in Jalisco

=== Paraguay ===
- San Antonio, Paraguay, a city in the Central Department
- San Antonio (Asunción), a neighbourhood of Asunción

=== Peru ===
- San Antonio District, Cañete
- San Antonio District, Huarochirí
- San Antonio de Putina Province in the Puno region
- San Antonio River (Peru)

=== Philippines ===
- San Antonio, Northern Samar, a municipality in Northern Samar
- San Antonio, Nueva Ecija, a municipality in Nueva Ecija
- San Antonio, Quezon, a municipality in Quezon
- San Antonio, Zambales, a municipality in Zambales
- San Antonio, Gandara, Samar, a barangay in Samar
- San Antonio, Parañaque, a barangay in Metro Manila
- San Antonio, Quezon City, a barangay in Metro Manila
- San Antonio, San Jose, Camarines Sur, a barangay in Camarines Sur
- San Antonio, San Pedro, a barangay in Laguna
- San Antonio, Santo Tomas, Batangas, a barangay in Batangas

=== Spain ===
- Cape San Antonio, Spain, a cape on the north coast of Alicante province
- San Antonio (Requena), a village in Valencia
- Sant Antoni de Portmany, a town in Ibiza

=== United States ===
==== California ====
- Lake San Antonio in Monterey and San Luis Obispo Counties
- Mount San Antonio of the San Gabriel Mountains, the highest point in Los Angeles County
- San Antonio, Oakland, California, a neighborhood in Alameda County
- San Antonio Creek (Marin County, California), an eastward-flowing stream in Marin and Sonoma Counties
- San Antonio Dam on the San Antonio River in Monterey County
- San Antonio Dam (San Bernardino County) in San Bernardino County
- San Antonio Reservoir in Alameda County
- San Antonio River (California) in Monterey County
- San Antonio Shopping Center in Mountain View
- San Antonio station (Caltrain), in Mountain View
- San Antonio Valley, California in Santa Clara County
- San Antonio Valley AVA, a wine region in Monterey County

==== Texas ====
- San Antonio (airport), an international airport in San Antonio
- San Antonio (Amtrak station), a railroad station San Antonio
- San Antonio River, originating in San Antonio
- San Antonio Springs, a cluster of springs that provide a large portion of the water for the San Antonio River

==== Other places in the United States ====
- Barrio San Antonio, a neighborhood of Tucson, Arizona
- San Antonio (Higuillar), a subbarrio of Dorado, Puerto Rico
- San Antonio, Colorado, a community in Conejos County, Colorado
- San Antonio, Florida, a city in Pasco County, Florida
- San Antonio, Missouri, an unincorporated community in Buchanan County, Missouri
- San Antonio, New Mexico, an unincorporated community in Socorro County, New Mexico
- San Antonio Hot Springs, a system of thermal springs in Sandoval County, New Mexico

=== Uruguay ===
- Cerro San Antonio, a hill in the Maldonado Department
- San Antonio, Canelones, a village in the Canelones Department
- San Antonio, Rocha, a seaside resort in the Rocha Department
- San Antonio, Salto, a suburb of Salto in the Salto Department

=== Other places ===
- San Antonio Lake (Bolivia), a lake in Bolivia
- Santo Antônio do Sudoeste, a municipality in Paraná State, Brazil
- San Antonio, El Salvador, a municipality in El Salvador
- San Antonio de Palé (formerly "San Antonio de Praia"), the capital of Annobón, an island in Equatorial Guinea
- San Antonio, Saipan, a settlement in the Mariana Islands
- San Antonio, Panama, in Veraguas Province, Panama
- San Antonio (Poschiavo), a municipality in the canton of Grisons, Switzerland
- San Antonio del Táchira, a city in the Venezuelan Andean state of Táchira, Venezuela
- San Antonio District, a district in the canton of Atenas, Costa Rica

== Entertainment ==
- San Antonio (film), a 1945 western directed by David Butler
- San Antone (film), a 1953 western directed by Joseph Kane
- "San Antonio," a song by Kinky from the 2002 album Kinky
- San Antone (album), 1984 album by Dan Seals
- San-Antonio, a series of French detective novels (1949–2001) by Frédéric Dard and the titular protagonist of that series; by extension, Dard himself, who used the name of his character as a pen name
- San-Antonio (film), a 2004 action comedy directed by Frédéric Auburtin, based on Dard's book series

== Transportation ==
- San Antonio station (disambiguation), stations of the name
- San Antonio (carrack), one of the ships of the Magellan Expedition
- San Antonio, a trading ship converted into the warship galleon San Diego in 1600
- USS San Antonio (LPD-17), an amphibious transport dock in the US Navy
- San Antonio Class, similar amphibious transport docks in the US Navy
- Spanish ship San Antonio
- ST Sanantonio, a Greek tugboat
- HMS San Antonio

== Other uses ==
- San Antonio Handicap, a thoroughbred horse race in California, U.S.
- San Antonio Spurs, an NBA team

== See also ==
- Rancho San Antonio (disambiguation)
- Saint Anthony (disambiguation)
- San Antonio Creek (disambiguation)
- San Antonio River (disambiguation)
- San Antonio Lake (disambiguation)
- San Antonio District (disambiguation)
- Sant'Antonio (disambiguation)
- Santo Antônio (disambiguation)
- San Antonino (disambiguation)
