= List of churches in Cape Verde =

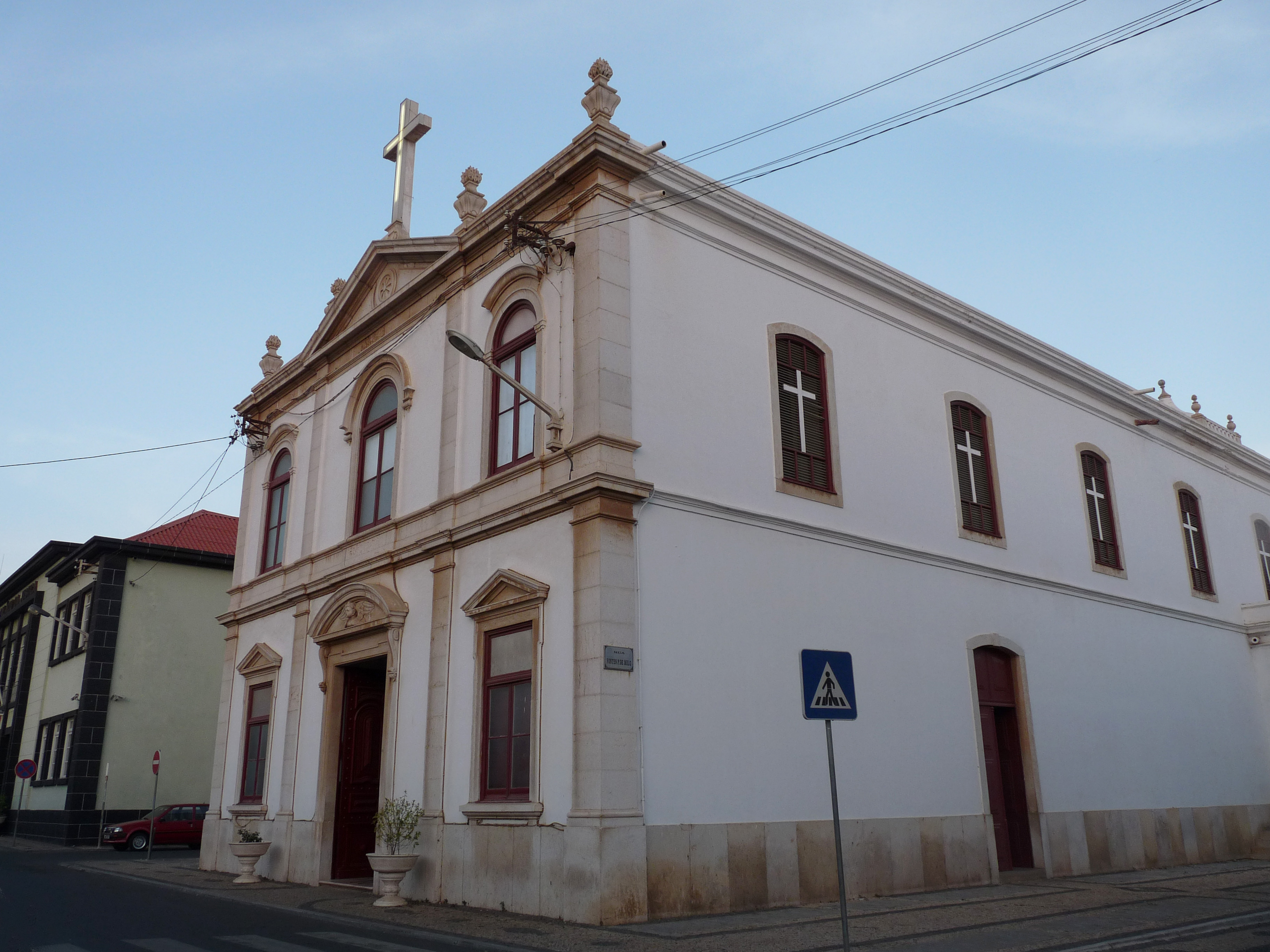
Our Lady of Grace Cathedral, Praia

This is a list of churches, cathedrals and chapels in Cape Verde.

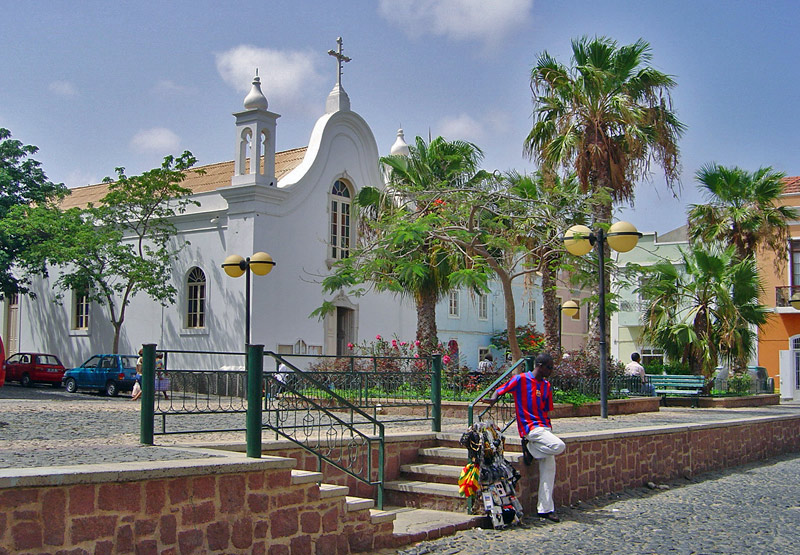
Our Lady of Light Cathedral, Mindelo

== Boa Vista ==
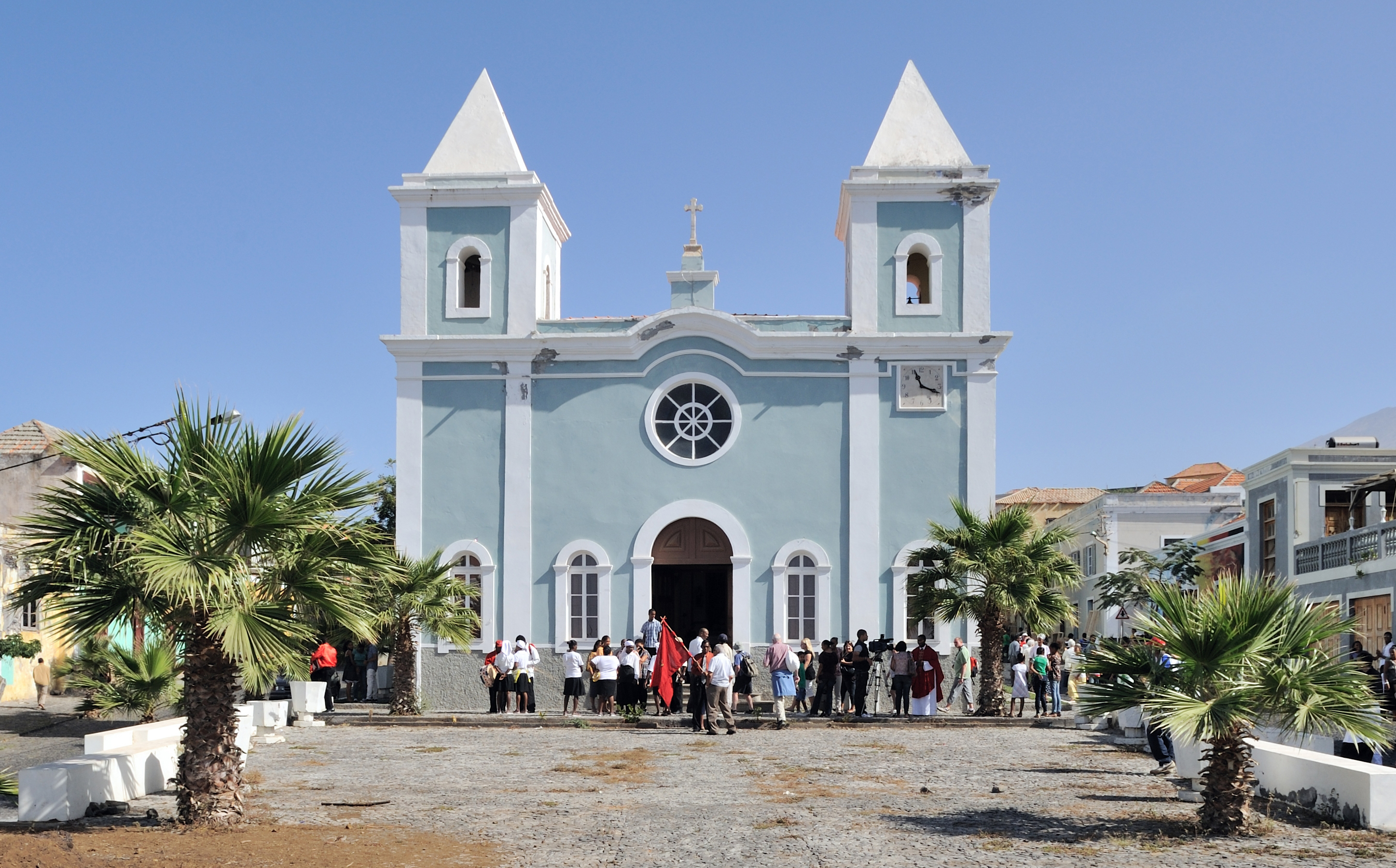
Our Lady of Conception church, São Filipe

- Nossa Senhora da Conceição - Povoação Velha
- Curral Velho church - reopened around 2010
- Espingueira church
- Capela de Nossa Senhora de Fátima - north of Sal Rei - abandoned
- Rabil church
- Sal Rei Nazarene church
- Santa Isabel church - Sal Rei^{1}
- Capela de Santo António - Povoação Velha
- São João Batista church - Fundo das Figueiras^{1}

== Brava ==
- Avedomar Estrela church - Furna
- Church of Jesus Christ of Latter Day Saints, Brava - one of Cape Verde's first Mormon churches
- Cachaço church
- Chapel in Mato Grande
- Church in Fajã de Água
- Nossa Senhora do Monte church, Nossa Senhora do Monte^{1}
- Nova Sintra Apostolic church
- Nova Sintra Adventist church
- Santa Bárbara church - Santa Bárbara
- São João Batista church - Nova Sintra^{1}

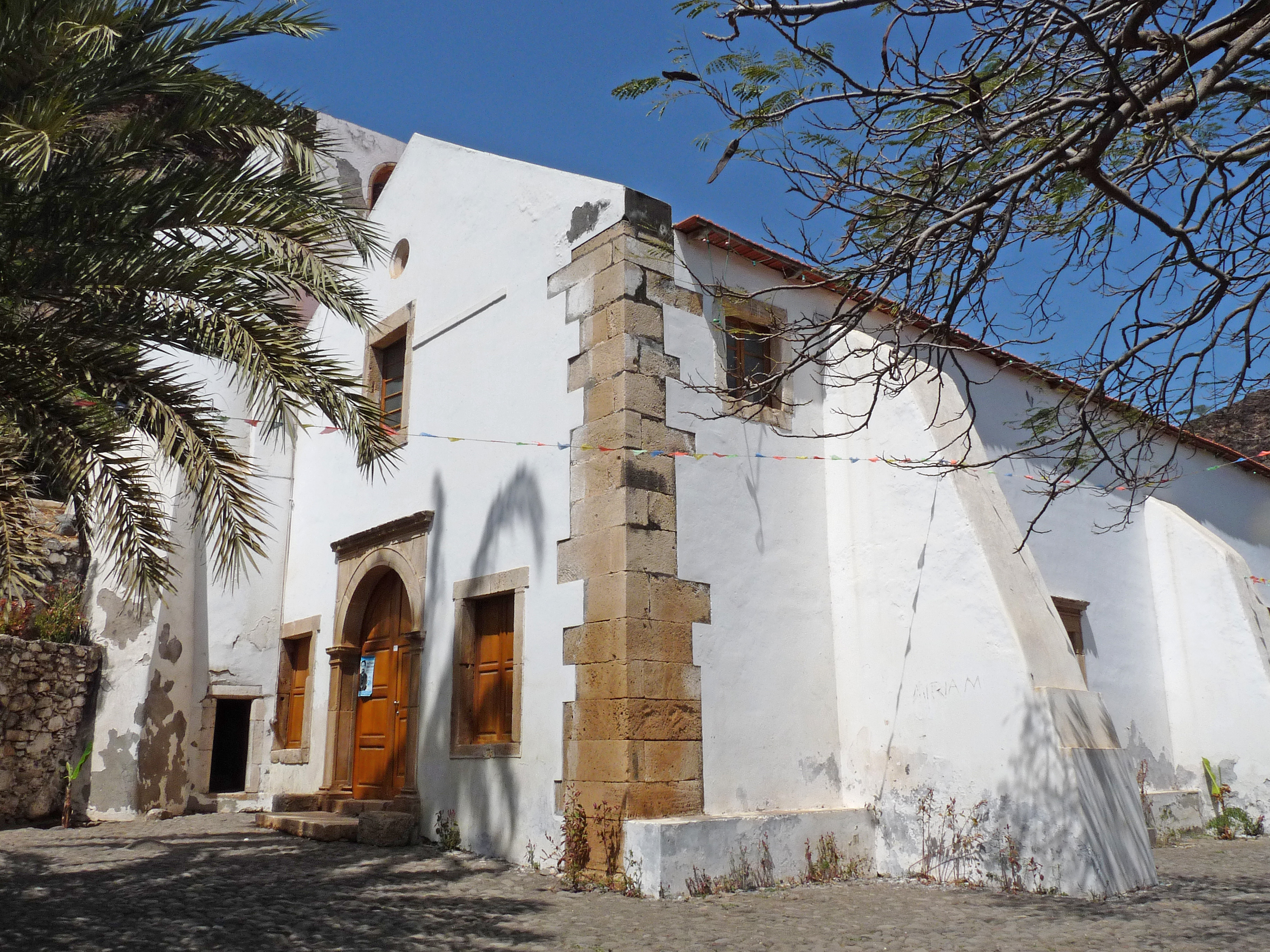
Nossa Senhora do Rosário church, Cidade Velha

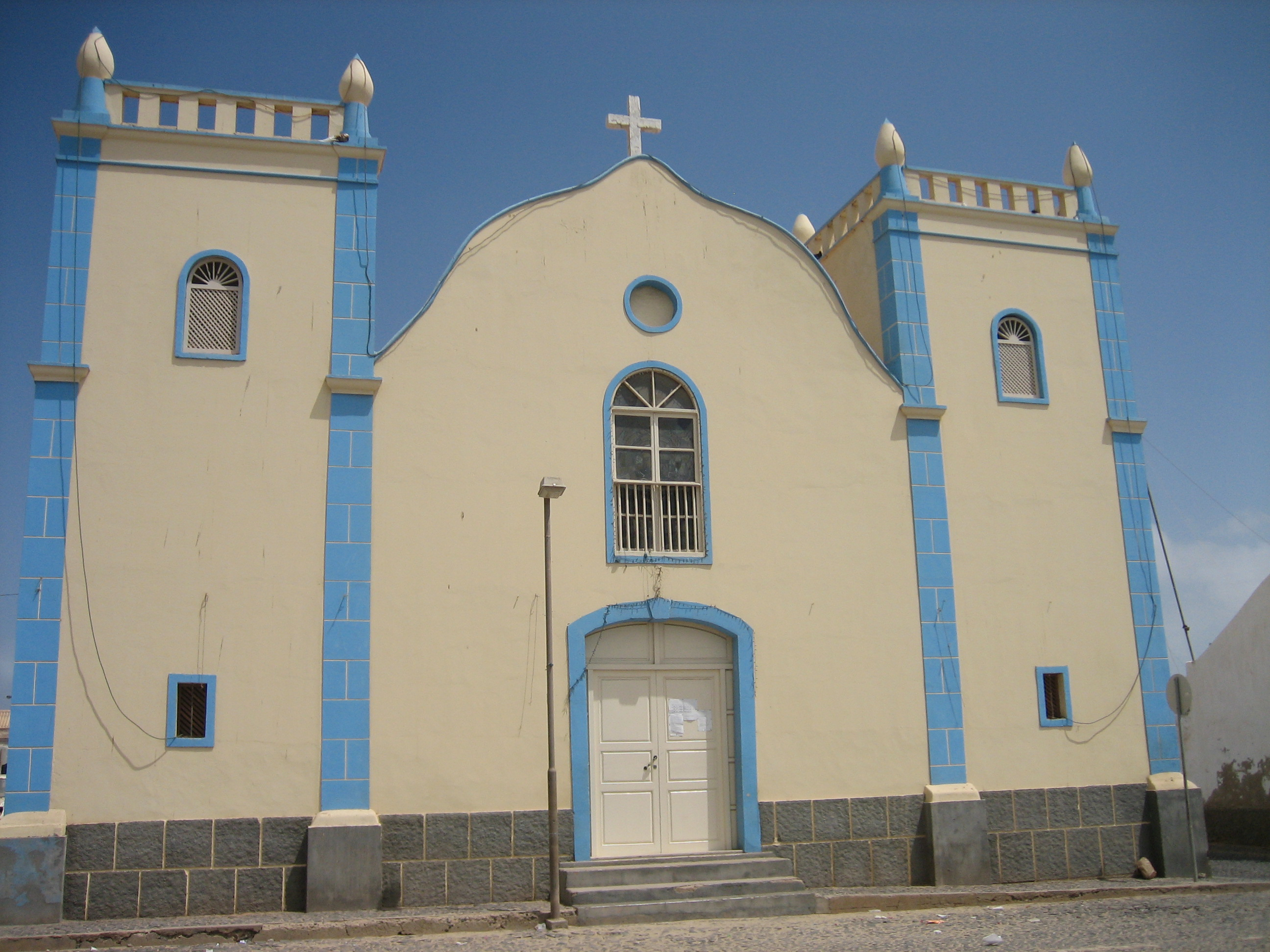
Santa Isabel church, Sal Rei

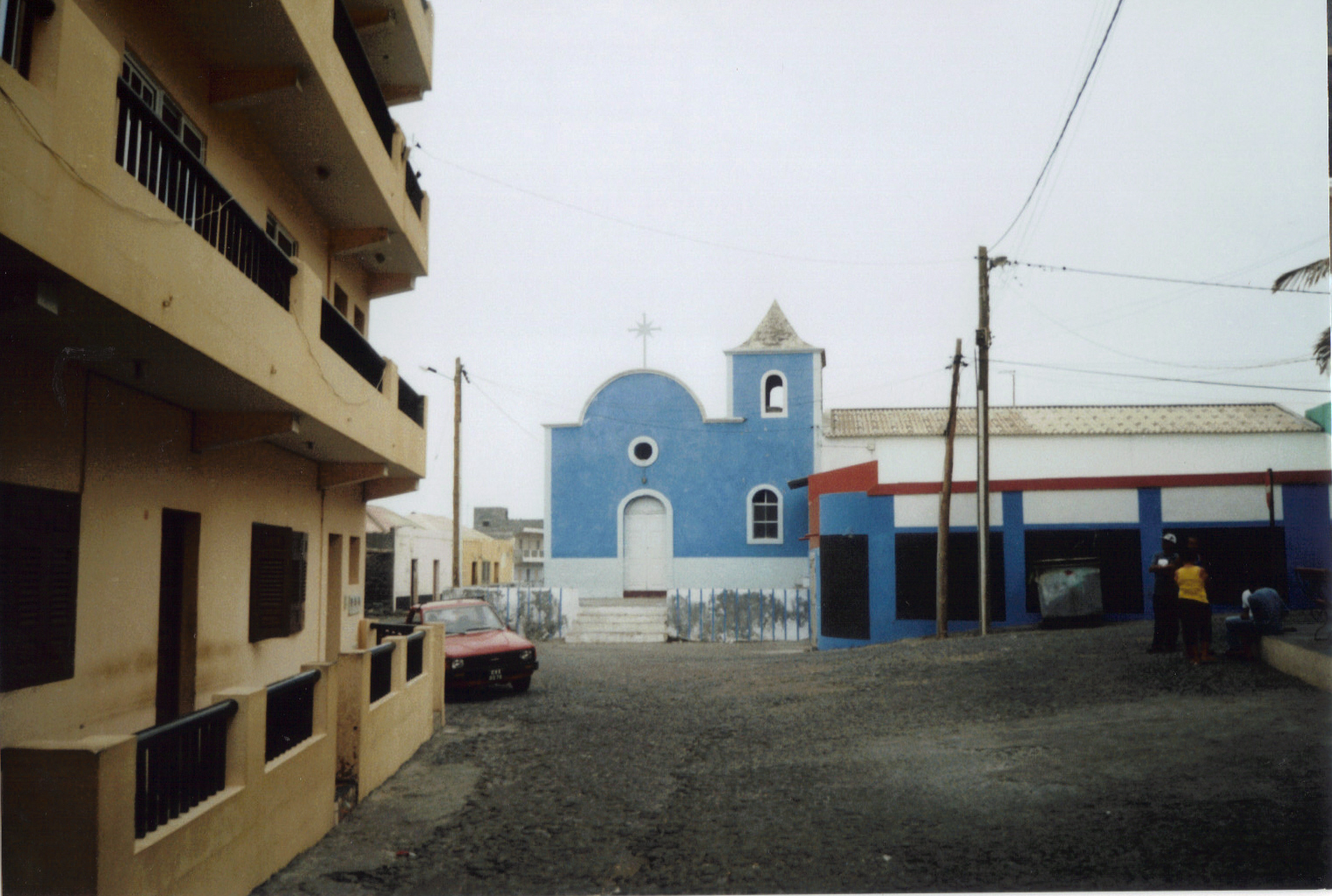
Nossa Senhora da Ajuda, Mosteiros

== Fogo ==
- Chã das Caldeiras Adventist church
- Church in Fonte Aleixo
- Church in Monte Largo
- Nossa Senhora da Ajuda church - Mosteiros^{1}
- Nossa Senhora da Conceição church/São Filipe Cathedral - São Filipe^{1}
- Nossa Senhora de Encarnação church - São Filipe
- Nossa Senhora do Socorro church - Vicente Dias
- Portela church - Chã das Caldeiras
- Church in Salto
- Santa Catarina church - Cova Figueira^{1}
- Santa Filomena church - São Filipe
- São Filipe city Seventh Day Adventist church
- São Filipe city Apostolic church
- São Filipe city Nazarene church
- São Francisco de Assís church - São Filipe
- São Lourenco church - São Lourenço^{1}

== Maio ==
- Barreiro chapel
- Cascabulho church
- Figueira da Horta church
- Morrinho church
- Nossa Senhora da Luz church - Cidade do Maio^{1}
- Santa Clara church
- Santo Antônio church
- São José church - Calheta do Maio
- São Pedro church - Pedro Vaz

== Sal ==
- Espargos Nazarene church - Espargos
- Nossa Senhora das Dores church, - Santa Maria^{1}
- Nossa Senhora de Piedade church - Pedra de Lume
- Capela de Pedra de Lume
- São João church - Espargos
- São José church - Palmeira

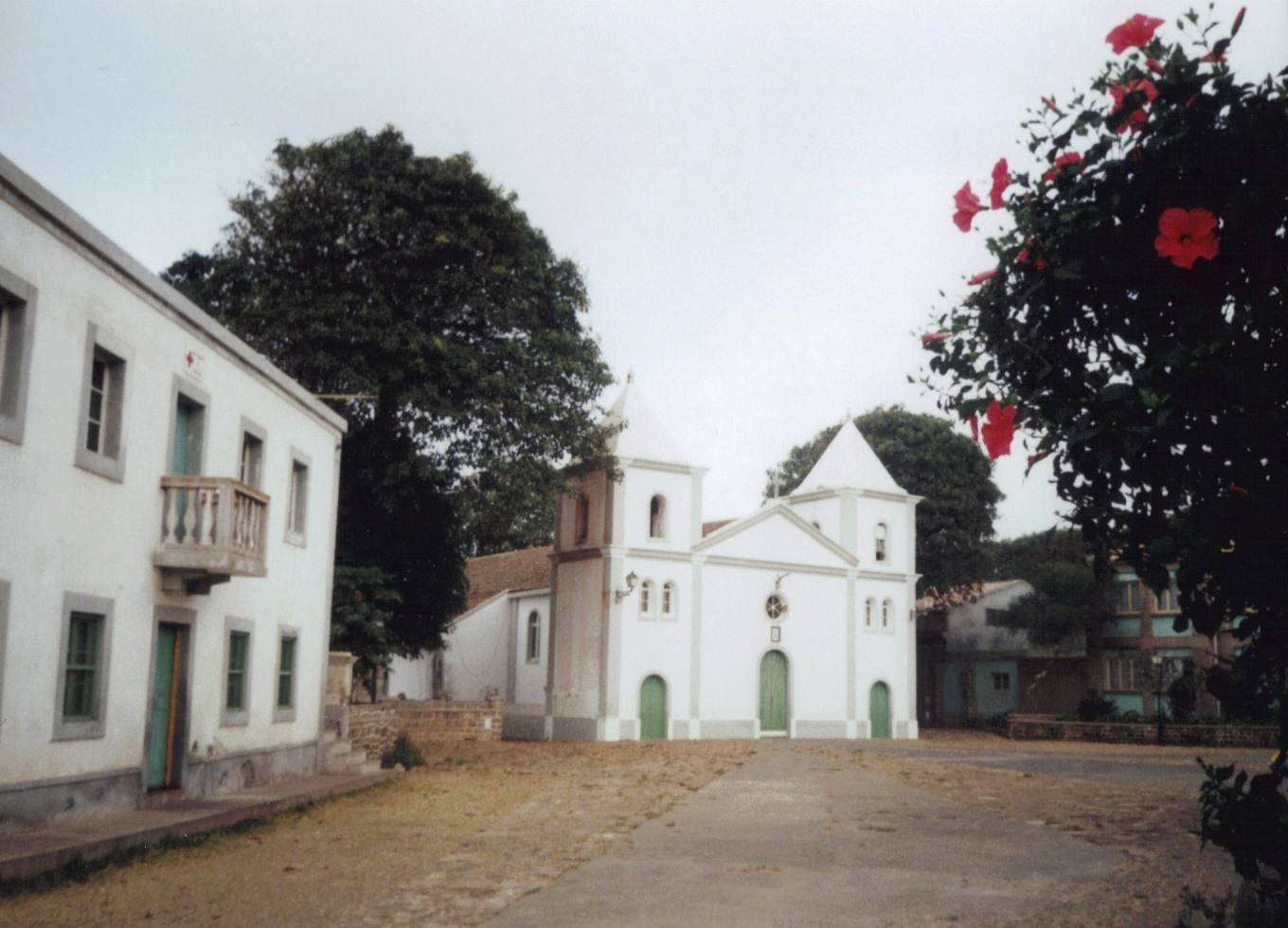
São João Baptista church, Nova Sintra

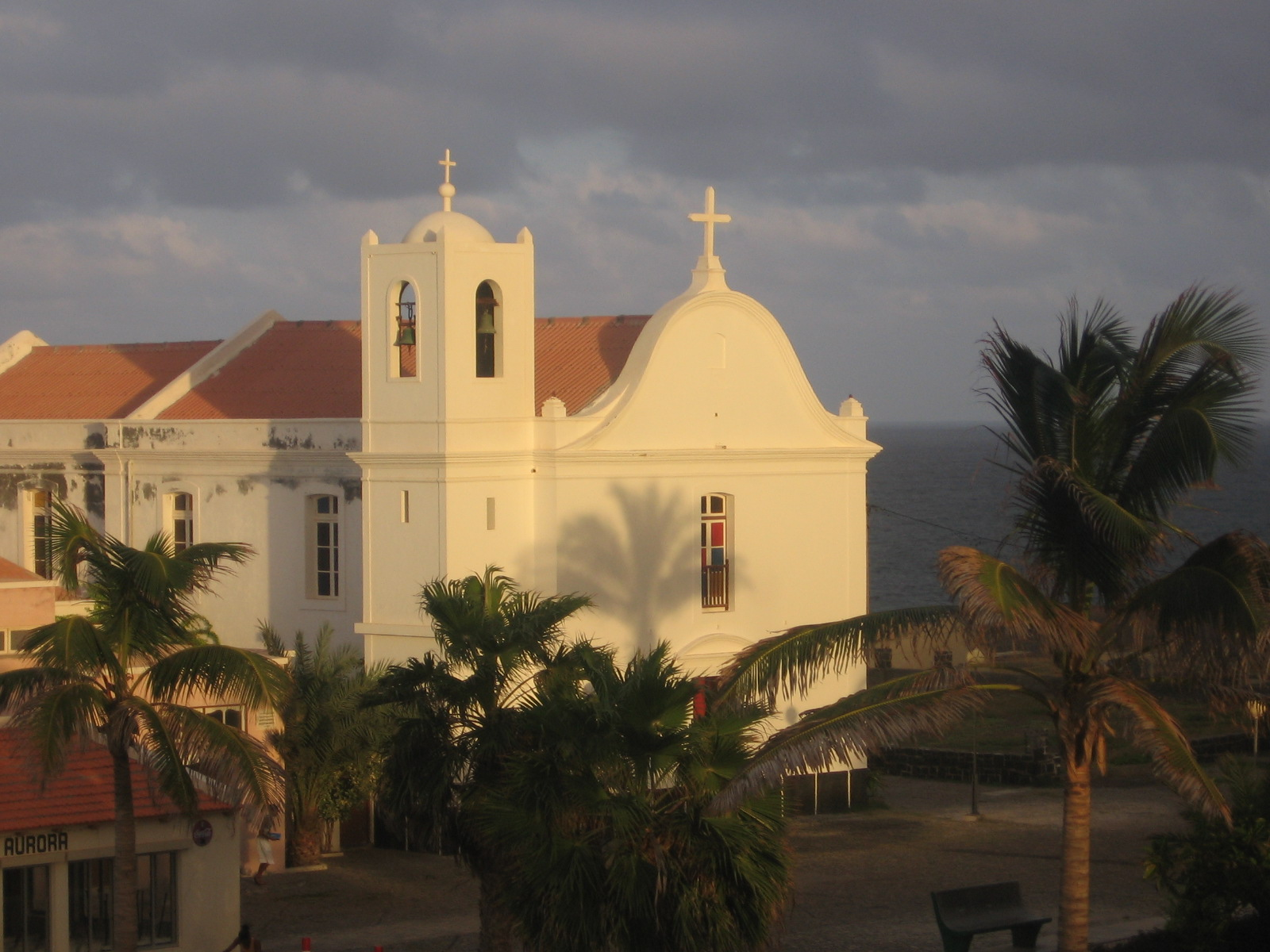
Nossa Senhora do Livramento church, Ponta do Sol

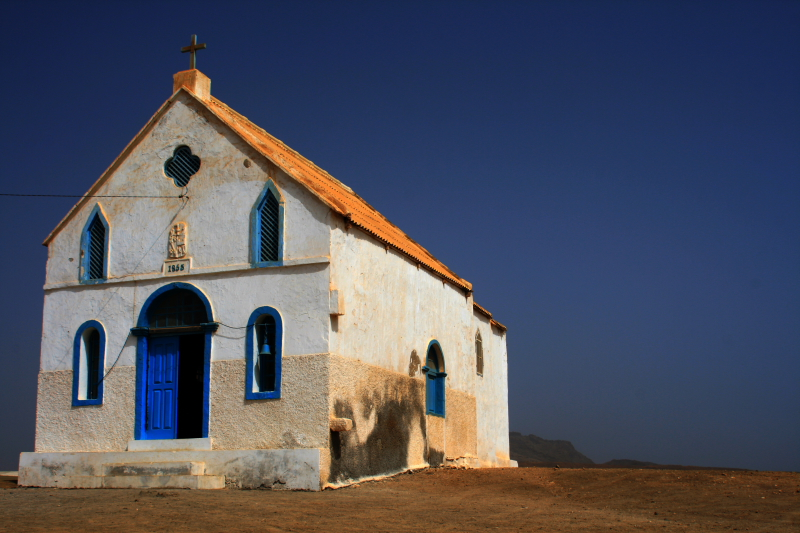
Pedra de Lume chapel

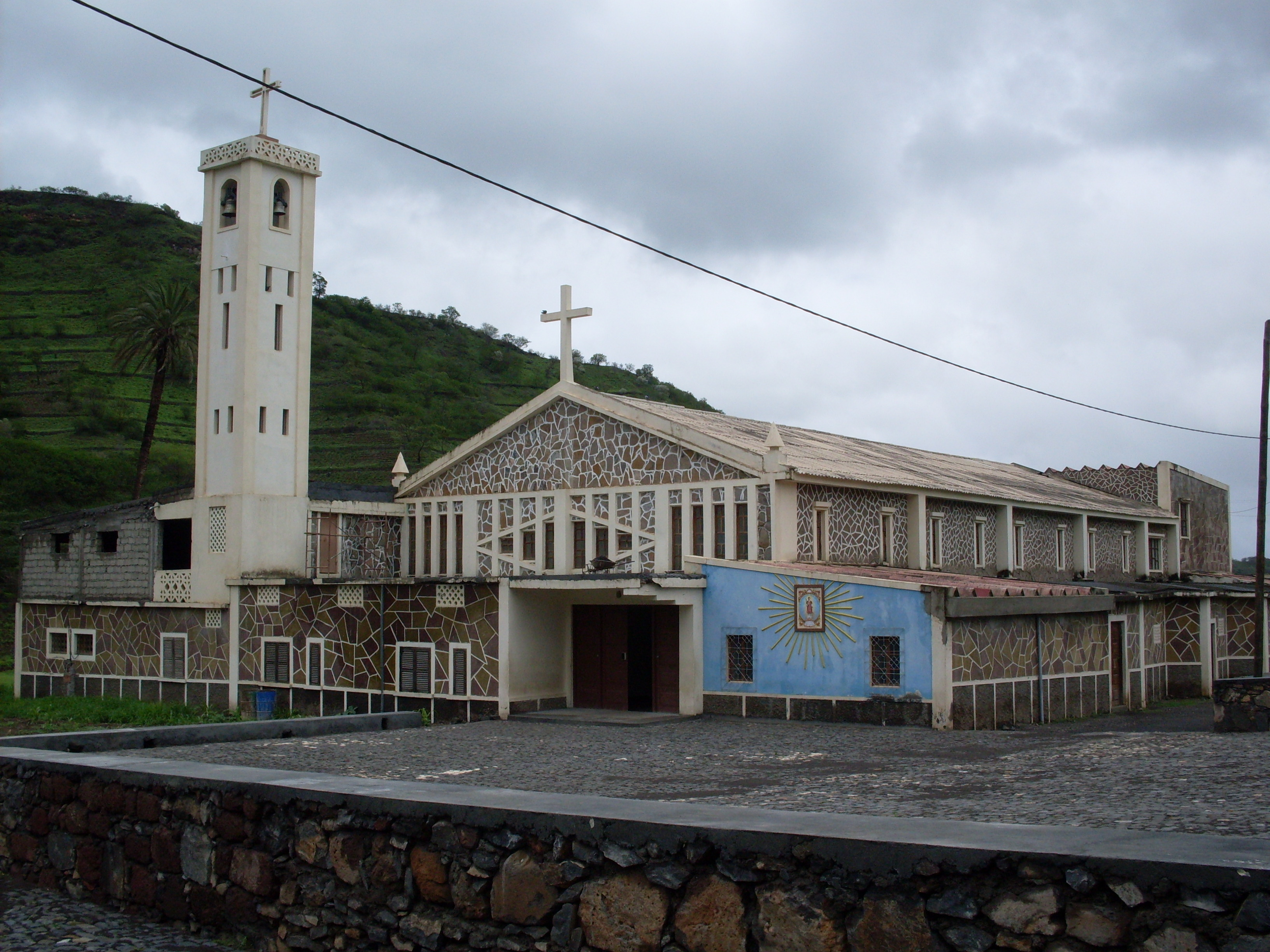
São Lourenço dos Órgãos church, João Teves

== Santiago ==
- Achada Grande Frente church
- Assomada Nazarene church
- Chão Bom church
- Cidade Velha Adventist church
- Hortelão church - Ribeira Principal
- Monte Alverne church - Cidade Velha - existed until around 1770
- Nossa Senhora da Conceição church - Cidade Velha - existed until around 1770
- Nossa Senhora da Fátima church - Assomada
- Nossa Senhora da Fátima church - Milho Branco
- Nossa Senhora da Luz church - Achada Baleia
- Nossa Senhora da Luz church - Milho Branco^{1}
- Nossa Senhora do Rosário church - Cidade Velha - the first colonial church and the first church in the sub-Saharan portion of West Africa
- Palmarejo Adventist church
- Our Lady of Grace Pro-Cathedral - Praia^{1}
- Pedra Badejo Apostolic church
- Pedra Badejo Baptist church
- Pedra Badejo Nazarene church
- Pedra Badejo Presbyterian church
- Porto Rincão church
- Praia Baptist church
- Praia Church of Jesus Christ of Latter-Day Saints church
- Praia Pentecostal church
- Praia Nazarene church
- Ribeira da Barca church
- Ribeira da Barca Adventist church
- Ribeira da Prata church
- Rui Vaz church
- Sagrado de Coração de Jesus church - Calabaceira, Praia
- Santiago Maior church - Pedra Badejo^{1}
- Santa Ana church - Santa Ana
- Santo Amaro Abade church - Tarrafal^{1}
- Santa Casa de Misericórdia church, also a hospital - Cidade Velha - existed until around 1770
- Santa Catarina church - Assomada, Achada Falcão^{1}
- Santa Luzia chapel - Cidade Velha - existed until around 1770
- Capela de Santo António - Achada Santo António, Praia
- Achada de Santo António Nazarene church
- São Gonçalo church
- Convent of Saint Francis (São Francisco) - Cidade Velha
- São João Batista church - São João Batista^{1}
- São Lourenço dos Órgãos church - João Teves^{1}
- São Martinho church - São Martinho Grande
- São Miguel Arcanjo church - Calheta de São Miguel^{1}
- São Nicolau Tolentino church - São Domingos^{1}
- São Pedro church - Cidade Velha - existed until around 1770
- São Pedro church - Praia
- São Roque church - Cidade Velha - existed until around 1770
- São Salvador do Mundo church - Picos^{1}
- Capela de São Sebastião - Cidade Velha
- Sé Cathedral - Cidade Velha
- Tira Chapéu church - Praia
- Capela de Trindade - Trindade, Praia
- Vila Nova Parish Church - Praia

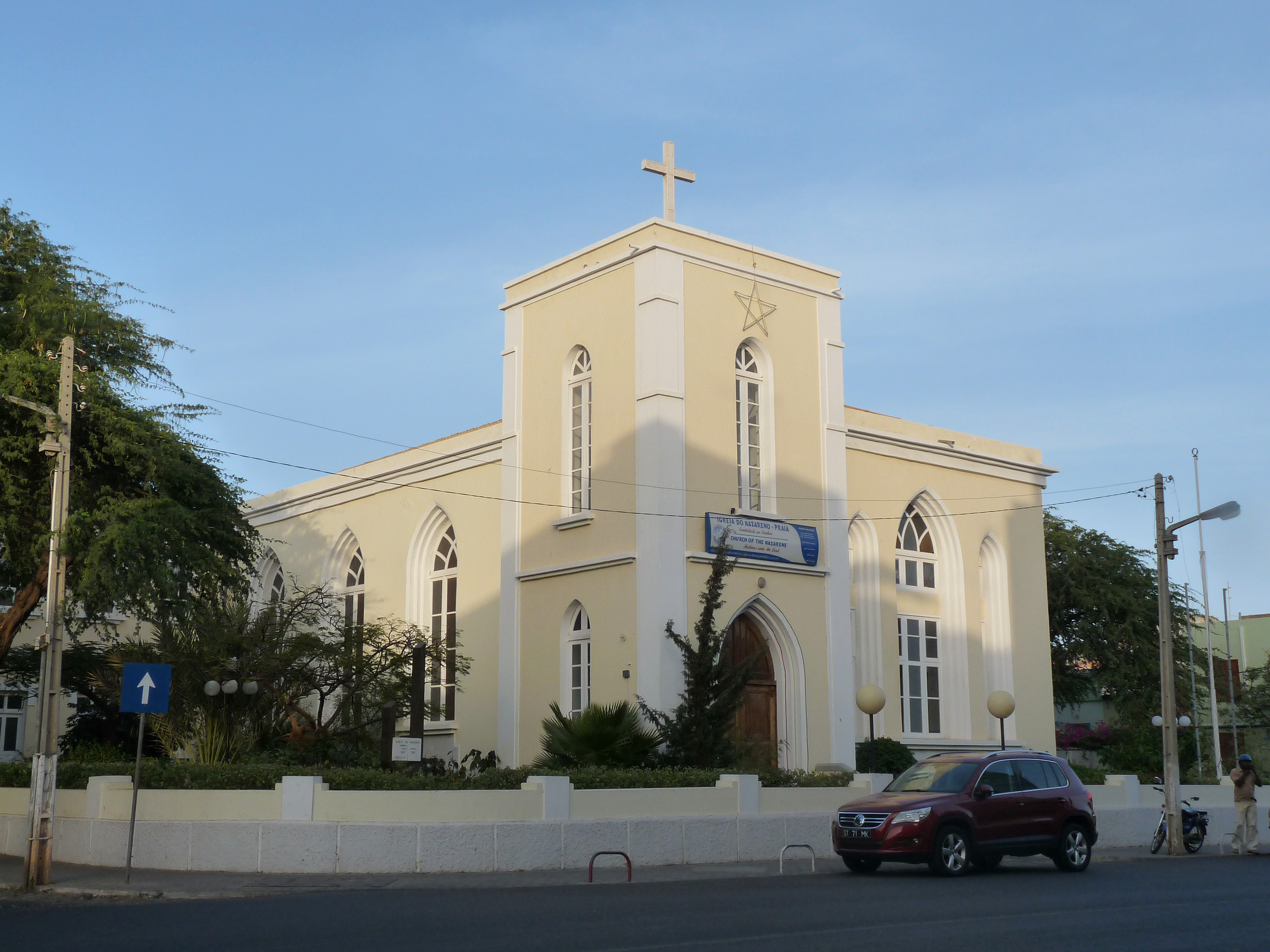
Praia Nazarene church

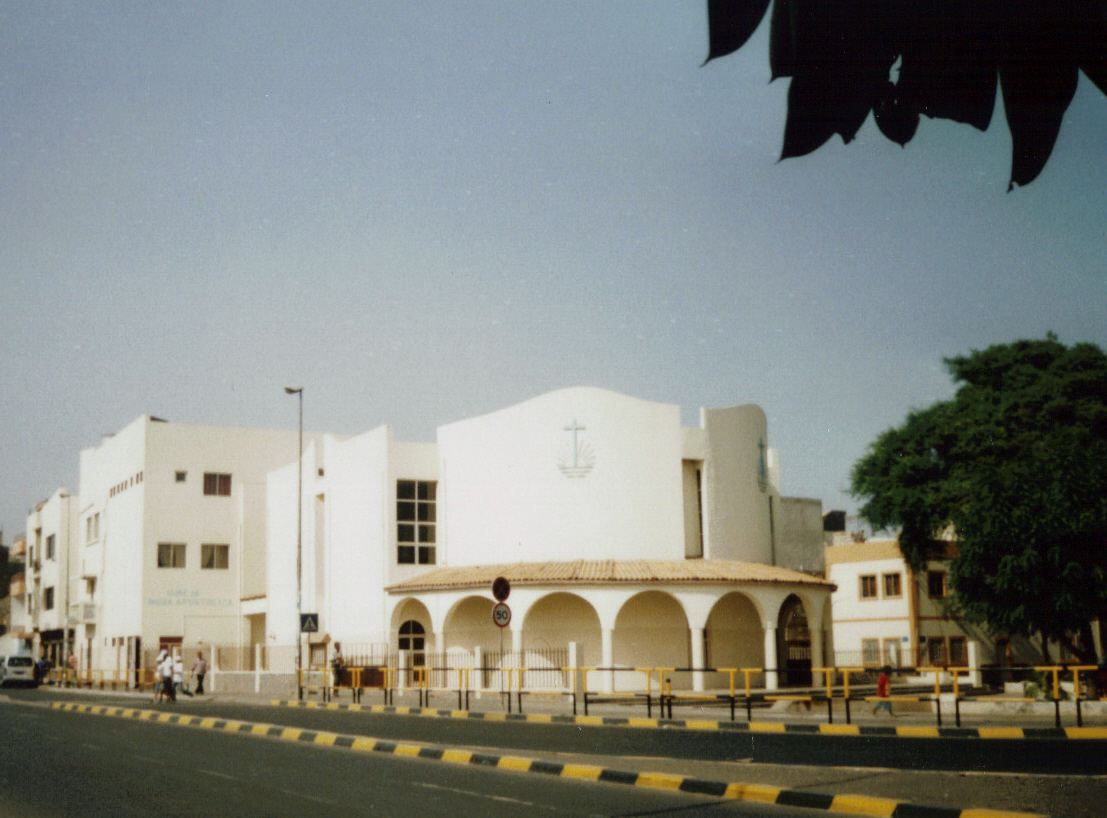
New Apostolic church, Praia

== Santo Antão ==
- Lagoinha chapel
- Lombo da Figueira church
- Monte Trigo church
- Nossa Senhora da Graça church - Pico da Cruz/Cintra da Vaca
- Nossa Senhora do Livramento church - Ponta do Sol^{1}
- Nossa Senhora do Rosário church - Ribeira Grande^{1}
- Santo André church - Ribeira das Pratas^{1}
- Santo António church - Pombas^{1}
- Santo Crucifixo church - Coculi^{1}
- São João Batista church - Porto Novo^{1}
- São Pedro church - Figueiral
- São Pedro church - Tarrafal de Monte Trigo
- São Pedro Apóstolo church - Chã da Igreja^{1}

== São Nicolau ==
- Juncalinho church
- Nossa Senhora da Lapa church - Queimadas^{1}
- Nossa Senhora do Rosário church - Ribeira Brava^{1}
- Praia Branca church
- Preguiça church
- São Francisco de Assis church - Tarrafal de São Nicolau^{1}

== São Vicente ==
- Mindelo Nazarene church
- Mindelo United Pentecostal church
- Mindelo Seventh Day Adventist church
- Nossa Senhora da Auxiliadora church - Mindelo
- Pro-Cathedral of Our Lady of the Light, Mindelo^{1}
- Santa Cruz church - Salamansa
- São Pedro church - São Pedro

== See also ==
- List of churches

== Notes ==
^{1}The church also serves as the seat of a parish
