= Antoine (disambiguation) =

Antoine may refer to:

- Antoine, a masculine given name
- Antoine (automobile), a Belgian automobile manufactured by Victor Antoine
- Antoine (film), as 2008 Canadian documentary film directed by Laura Bari.
- Antoine, a French pop singer, and also a sailor, adventurer, writer, photographer, and filmmaker
- Eddy Antoine (1949–2026), Haitian footballer

== See also ==
- Antonio (disambiguation)
- Saint-Antoine (disambiguation)
- Sant'Antonio (disambiguation)
- San Antonio (disambiguation)
- Santo Antonio (disambiguation)
- Anthony (disambiguation)
