= Santo Antônio =

Santo António or Santo Antônio (Portuguese for "Saint Anthony") may refer to the following places:

== In Brazil ==
- Barra de Santo Antônio, Alagoas
- Novo Santo Antônio, Piauí
- Riacho de Santo Antônio, Paraíba
- Santo Antônio, Rio Grande do Norte, Rio Grande do Norte
- Santo Antônio da Alegria, São Paulo
- Santo Antônio do Amparo, Minas Gerais
- Santo Antônio do Aracanguá, São Paulo
- Santo Antônio do Aventureiro, Minas Gerais
- Santo Antônio da Barra, Goiás
- Santo Antônio do Caiuá, Paraná
- Santo Antônio, Carira, Sergipe
- Santo Antônio do Descoberto, Goiás
- Santo Antônio de Goiás, Goiás
- Santo Antônio do Grama, Minas Gerais
- Santo Antônio do Içá, Amazonas
- Santo Antônio do Itambé, Minas Gerais
- Santo Antônio do Jacinto, Minas Gerais
- Santo Antônio do Jardim, São Paulo
- Santo Antônio de Jesus, Bahia
- Santo Antônio de Leverger, Mato Grosso
- Santo Antônio de Lisboa, Piauí
- Santo Antônio de Lisboa, Santa Catarina
- Santo Antônio dos Lopes, Maranhão
- Santo Antônio dos Milagres, Piauí
- Santo Antônio das Missões, Rio Grande do Sul
- Santo Antônio do Monte, Minas Gerais
- Santo Antônio de Pádua, Rio de Janeiro
- Santo Antônio do Palma, Rio Grande do Sul
- Santo Antônio do Paraíso, Paraná
- Santo Antônio da Patrulha, Rio Grande do Sul
- Santo Antônio do Pinhal, São Paulo
- Santo Antônio do Planalto, Rio Grande do Sul
- Santo Antônio da Platina, Paraná
- Santo Antônio de Posse, São Paulo
- Santo Antônio do Retiro, Minas Gerais
- Santo Antônio do Rio Abaixo, Minas Gerais
- Santo Antônio do Sudoeste, Paraná
- Santo Antônio do Tauá, Para

== In Cape Verde ==
- Santo António (Fogo), in the island of Fogo
- Santo António (Maio), in the island of Maio

== In Portugal ==
- Santo António, Lisbon, a commune (freguesia) in the municipality of Lisbon
- Vila Real de Santo António

=== In the Azores ===
- Santo António (Ponta Delgada), a commune in the municipality of Ponta Delgada
- Santo António (São Roque do Pico), a commune in the municipality of São Roque do Pico

=== In Madeira ===
- Santo António (Funchal), a commune in the municipality of Funchal
- Santo António da Serra (Machico), a commune in the municipality of Machico
- Santo António da Serra (Santa Cruz), a commune in the municipality of Santa Cruz

== In Macau ==
- Santo António, Macau, a parish on the Macau Peninsula

== In São Tomé and Príncipe ==
- Santo António

== See also ==
- Sant'Antonio (disambiguation)
- San Antonio (disambiguation)
- Saint Anthony (disambiguation)
