= Praia Gonçalo =

Beach in Cape Verde

- Settlement
- Coordinates: 15.267°N 23.114°W
- Country: Cape Verde
- Island: Maio
- Municipality: Maio
- Civil parish: Nossa Senhora da Luz

Population (2010)
  - Total: 67
- ID: 61109

Praia Gonçalo is a settlement in the northeast of the island of Maio in Cape Verde. In 2010 population was 67. It is located 2 km north of Pedro Vaz and 18 km northeast of the island capital Porto Inglês.

== See also ==
- List of villages and settlements in Cape Verde
