= Lagoa Cimidor =

- Location within Cape Verde
- Location: southeastern Maio, Cape Verde
- Coordinates: 15.1657°N 23.0952°W
- Type: Lagoon
- Primary inflows: Ribeira das Tras and Ribeira do Poço
- Basin countries: Cape Verde
- Surface elevation: 2 m (6 ft 7 in)

Lagoa Cimidor is a small coastal lagoon in the southeastern part of the island of Maio in Cape Verde. It is situated 3.5 km northeast of the village Ribeira Dom João and 13 km east of the island capital Cidade do Maio. It is part of a 3.89 km^{2} (1.50 sq mi) protected area (Reserva Natural da Lagoa Cimidor) which also includes the adjacent coast. One of the largest permanent bodies of water on the island, it is an important area for birds and turtles.

== See also ==
- List of lakes in Cape Verde
- List of protected areas in Cape Verde
