= Monte Penoso =

Mountain in Cape Verde

- Location within Cape Verde

Highest point
- Elevation: 436 m (1,430 ft)
- Prominence: 436 m (1,430 ft)
- Listing: List of mountains in Cape Verde
- Coordinates: 15°13′40″N 23°07′48″W

Geography
- Location: eastern Maio

Monte Penoso is a mountain on the island of Maio, Cape Verde. At 436 m elevation, it is the island's highest point. It is situated in the eastern part of the island, 3 km southwest of Pedro Vaz and 13 km northeast of the island capital Porto Inglês. The mountain is of volcanic origin. It is part of the protected landscape Monte Penoso and Monte Branco, which covers 11.17 km^{2} (4.31 sq mi).

== See also ==
- List of mountains in Cape Verde
- List of protected areas in Cape Verde
