= Ribeira Dom João =

- Settlement
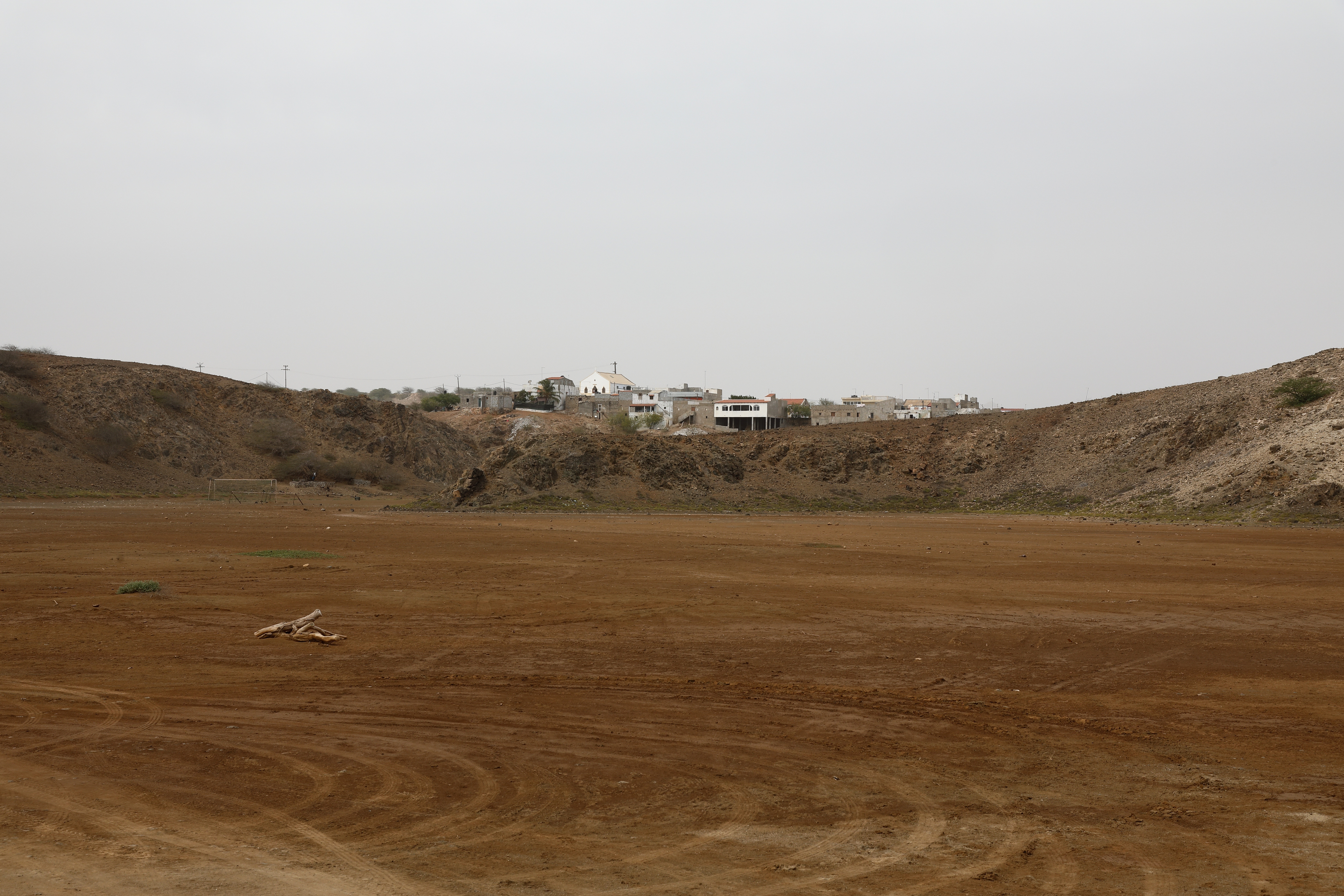
- Ribeira dom João seen from the beach

- Location within Cape Verde
- Coordinates: 15.144°N 23.122°W
- Country: Cape Verde
- Island: Maio
- Municipality: Maio
- Civil parish: Nossa Senhora da Luz
- Elevation: 6 m (20 ft)

Population (2010)
  - Total: 203
- ID: 61110

Ribeira Dom João is a settlement in the southeast of the island of Maio in Cape Verde. It lies near the coast, 4 km east of Barreiro and 10 km east of Porto Inglês. As of the 2010 census, its population was 203.

== See also ==
- List of villages and settlements in Cape Verde
