= Pilão Cão =

- Settlement
- Coordinates: 15.208°N 23.105°W
- Country: Cape Verde
- Island: Maio
- Municipality: Maio
- Civil parish: Nossa Senhora da Luz

Population (2010)
  - Total: 102
- ID: 61112

Pilão Cão is a settlement in the eastern part of the island of Maio in Cape Verde. In 2010 its population was 102. It is located 1 km south of Alcatraz and 14 km northeast of the island capital Porto Inglês.

== See also ==
- List of villages and settlements in Cape Verde
