= Morro, Cape Verde =

Morro
- Settlement
- Coordinates: 15.180°N 23.222°W
- Country: Cape Verde
- Island: Maio
- Municipality: Maio
- Civil parish: Nossa Senhora da Luz
- Elevation: 15 m (49 ft)

Population (2010)
  - Total: 310
- ID: 61106

Morro is a settlement in the west of the island of Maio in Cape Verde. It is located 5 km north of the island capital Porto Inglês and 6 km south of Calheta. As of the 2010 census, its population was 310. The beach north of the village, Praia do Morro, is a 6.66 km^{2} nature reserve.

== See also ==
- List of villages and settlements in Cape Verde
