= Terras Salgadas =

Saline ecosystem on Maio, Cape Verde

Coordinates: 15.29°N 23.18°W

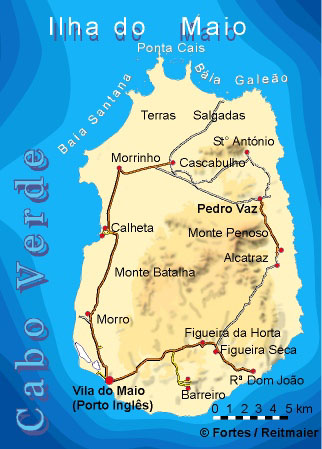
- Terras Salgadas in the north of the island Maio
- Interactive map of Terras Salgadas
- Location: northernmost part of Maio

Terras Salgadas (Portuguese meaning "salty lands") is a vast natural area covering the northwestern part of the island of Maio, Cape Verde. It is part of the protected area Parque Natural do Norte da Ilha do Maio. It is the largest saline ecosystem of the whole archipelago, characterized by imposing sand dunes. The area is rich in endemic species of sea birds, fish and sea turtles. The nearest settlements are Morrinho, Cascabulho and Santo António. As "saline" (French) and "zoutpan" (Dutch) it was mentioned in the 1747 map by Jacques-Nicolas Bellin.

== See also ==
- List of protected areas in Cape Verde
