= Antonio (disambiguation) =

Antonio may refer to:

- Antonio, a masculine given name of Etruscan origin deriving from the root name Antonius
- Antonio (dancer), a Spanish flamenco dancer, choreographer and dance director
- Antonio (horse), was a British Thoroughbred racehorse and sire
- Antonio (singer), a United Kingdom-based Jamaican reggae singer
- Antonio (The Merchant of Venice), the title character in Shakespeare's The Merchant of Venice.
- Antonio (play), an 1800 play by William Godwin

== See also ==
- Sant'Antonio (disambiguation)
- San Antonio (disambiguation)
- Santo Antonio (disambiguation)
- Anthony (disambiguation)
