= Galeão =

Galeão (Portuguese meaning galleon) may refer to:

- Galeão Air Force Base, a Brazilian Air Force base in Rio de Janeiro, Brazil
- Rio de Janeiro–Galeão International Airport (Galeão–Antonio Carlos Jobim International Airport), an airport in the city of Rio de Janeiro, Brazil
- Galeão, Rio de Janeiro, a district and beach in the neighborhood of Ilha do Governador in the city of Rio de Janeiro, Brazil
- Galleon, Portuguese: Galeão, a large, multi-decked sailing ship used primarily by European states from the 16th to 18th centuries
- Baía do Galeão, a bay northeast of the island of Maio in Cape Verde
