= São Gonçalo do Piauí =

- Municipality
- Location in Piauí state

- Location in Brazil
- Coordinates: 05°59′36″S 42°42′10″W
- Country: Brazil
- Region: Northeast
- State: Piauí
- Mesoregion: Centro-Norte Piauiense
- Microregion: Médio Parnaíba Piauiense

Area
  - Total: 150.22 km^{2} (58.00 sq mi)
- Elevation: 240 m (790 ft)

Population (2020)
  - Total: 5,030
  - Density: 33.5/km^{2} (86.7/sq mi)
- Time zone: UTC−3 (BRT)
- Postal code: 64438-xxx

São Gonçalo do Piauí (first part, Portuguese meaning "San Goncalo of Piaui") is a municipality of the Brazilian state of Piauí. It is located at an altitude of 270 meters. The population is 5,030 (2020 est.) in an area of 150.22 km^{2}. After a plebiscite held in 1995, part of the municipality was split off and became the municipality of Santo Antônio dos Milagres.
