= Conus gonsalensis =

Scientific classification
- Kingdom: Animalia
- Phylum: Mollusca
- Class: Gastropoda
- Subclass: Caenogastropoda
- Order: Neogastropoda
- Superfamily: Conoidea
- Family: Conidae
- Genus: Conus
- Species: C. gonsalensis

Binomial name
- Conus gonsalensis (Cossignani & Fiadeiro, 2014)

Synonyms
- Africonus gonsalensis Cossignani & Fiadeiro, 2014

Species of sea snail

Conus gonsalensis is a species of sea snail, a marine gastropod mollusc in the family Conidae, the cone snails, cone shells or cones.

These snails are predatory and venomous. They are capable of stinging humans.

== Description ==
The size of the shell attains 11 mm.

== Distribution ==
This marine species occurs in the Atlantic Ocean off Maio Island, Cape Verde.
