= Morrinho =

- Settlement
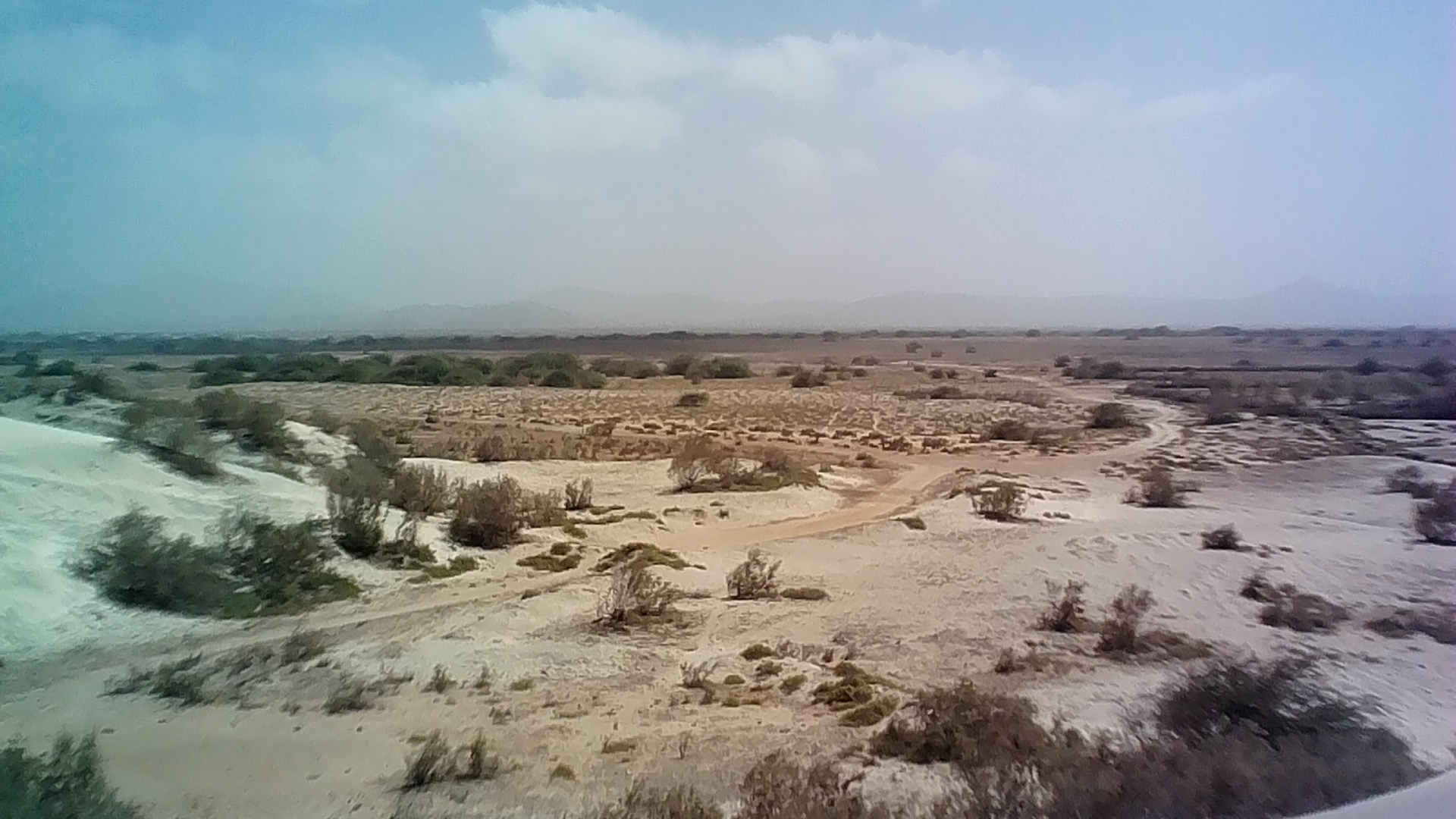
- Wilderness near Morrinho

- Location within Cape Verde
- Coordinates: 15.266°N 23.205°W
- Country: Cape Verde
- Island: Maio
- Municipality: Maio
- Civil parish: Nossa Senhora da Luz
- Elevation: 10 m (33 ft)

Population (2010)
  - Total: 444
- ID: 61105

Morrinho is a settlement in the northwest of the island of Maio in Cape Verde. It is 14 km north of the island capital Porto Inglês and 4 km north of Calheta. As of the 2010 census, its population was 444. To its north are the nature reserve Terras Salgadas and the beach of Baía da Santana.

== See also ==
- List of villages and settlements in Cape Verde
