= Ilhéu Laje Branca =

Island in Cape Verde

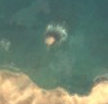
- Ilhéu Laje Branca

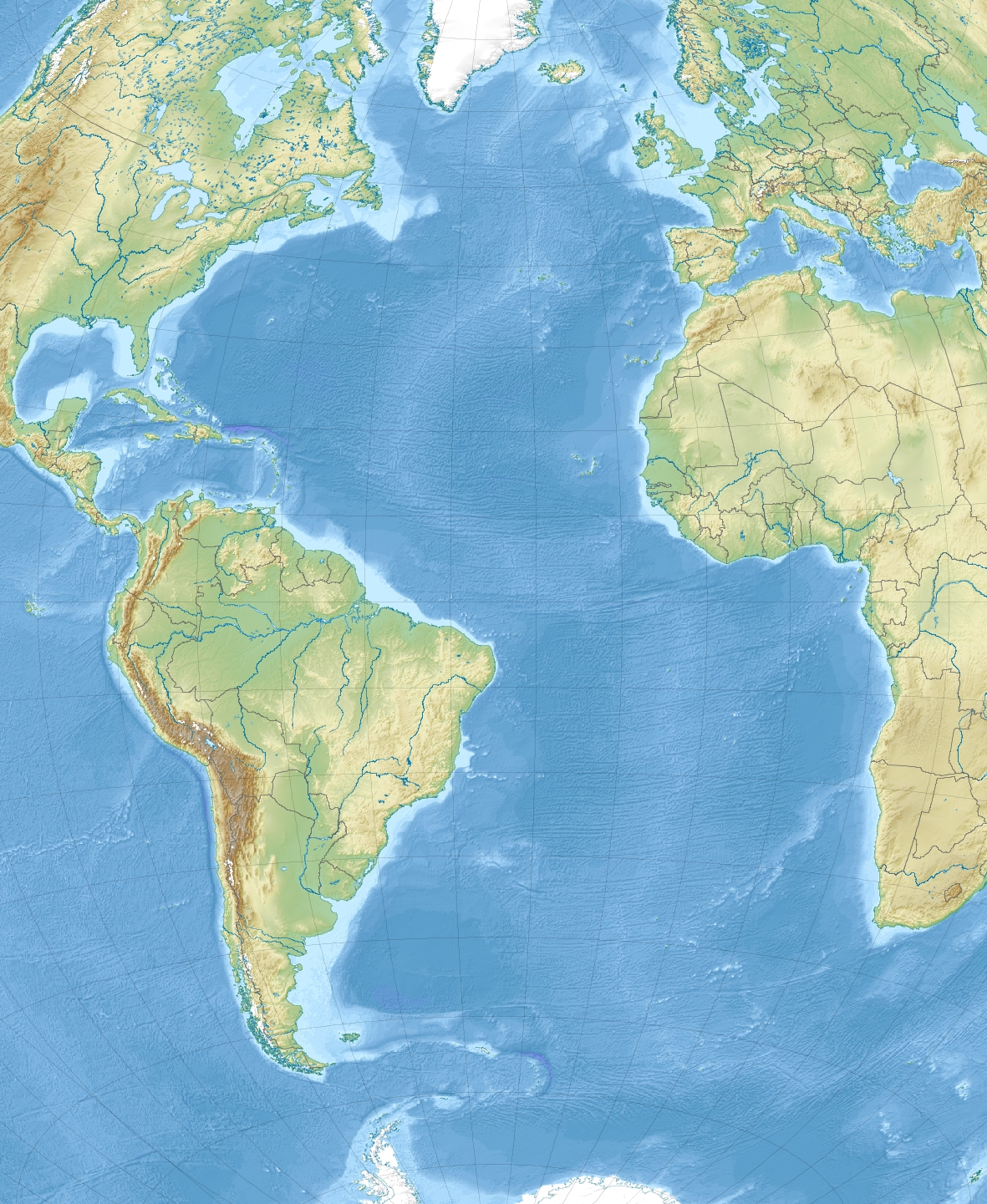
- Location within Cape Verde Location within Atlantic Ocean

Geography
- Location: Atlantic Ocean
- Coordinates: 15.313°N 23.137°W
- Length: 0.08 km (0.05 mi)
- Width: 0.07 km (0.043 mi)
- Highest elevation: 5 m (16 ft)

Administration
- Cape Verde
- Municipality: Maio

Demographics
- Population: 0

Ilhéu Laje Branca is an uninhabited islet near the north coast of Maio Island, Cape Verde. It lies about 350 metres (0.22 miles) from the coast. It is part of the protected area Parque Natural do Norte da Ilha do Maio, and hosts a colony of white-faced storm petrel.
