= San Antonio station =

San Antonio station may refer to:

- San Antonio station (Caltrain), a Caltrain station in Mountain View, California
- San Antonio station (Medellín), a Medellín Metro station in Colombia
- San Antonio station (Texas), an Amtrak station in San Antonio, Texas
- San Antonio metro station (Mexico City), in Mexico City, Mexico
- San Antonio metro station (Panama), in Panama City, Panama
- San Antonio Abad metro station, in Mexico City, Mexico
- Kukullaga station, Spanish station formerly named San Antonio-Etxebarri
- Paseo de San Antonio station, a VTA light rail station in San Jose, California

== See also ==
- San Antonio (disambiguation)
