= Figueira (Maio) =

- Settlement
- Coordinates: 15.160°N 23.152°W
- Country: Cape Verde
- Island: Maio
- Municipality: Maio
- Civil parish: Nossa Senhora da Luz
- Elevation: 40 m (130 ft)

Population (2010)
  - Total: 529
- ID: 61104

Figueira is a settlement in the southern part of the island of Maio. It consists of the villages Figueira da Horta and Figueira Seca. Figueira is 7 km east of the island capital Porto Inglês. As of the 2010 census, its population was 529. It sits at 40 meters above sea level.

== See also ==
- List of villages and settlements in Cape Verde
