= Alcatraz, Cape Verde =

Alcatraz
- Settlement
- Coordinates: 15.217°N 23.104°W
- Country: Cape Verde
- Island: Maio
- Municipality: Maio
- Civil parish: Nossa Senhora da Luz

Population (2010)
  - Total: 232
- ID: 61108

Alcatraz is a village in the eastern part of the island of Maio. The village is situated near the coast, 1 km north of Pilão Cão and 15 km northeast of the island capital Porto Inglês. In 2010 its population was 232.

== See also ==
- List of villages and settlements in Cape Verde
