= San Antonio Creek =

San Antonio Creek may refer to any of the following waterways in California, United States:

- San Antonio Creek (Alameda Creek), a tributary of Alameda Creek in Alameda County
- San Antonio Creek (Santa Clara County), a northwesterly-flowing stream
- San Antonio Creek (San Bernardino County), a major stream in Los Angeles and San Bernardino Counties
- San Antonio Creek (Marin County, California), a stream in Marin and Sonoma Counties
- San Antonio Creek (Vandenberg Air Force Base), a creek in Santa Barbara County
- Estero de San Antonio, a stream in Marin and Sonoma Counties
- San Antonio Creek, a tributary of the Ventura River, in Ventura County

== See also ==
- San Antonio River (disambiguation)
