= Lists of church buildings =

Lists of church buildings cover church buildings, places of worship for Christians.

== General ==
- List of church buildings, a selection of mosques among the most famous, worldwide
  - List of largest church buildings
  - List of longest church buildings
  - List of tallest church buildings
  - List of oldest church buildings

== By country ==
- Lists of Armenian churches § Armenia
- List of churches in Albania
- List of churches in Belize
- List of churches in Cape Verde
- Lists of churches in England
- List of churches in Estonia
- List of church buildings in Indonesia
- List of churches in Malta
- List of churches in Nigeria
- List of churches in North Macedonia
- List of churches in Pakistan
- List of churches in Palestine
- List of churches in Portugal
- List of churches in Scotland
- List of churches in Sweden
- List of churches in Zimbabwe
