= Baía do Galeão =

Bay in Maio, Cape Verde

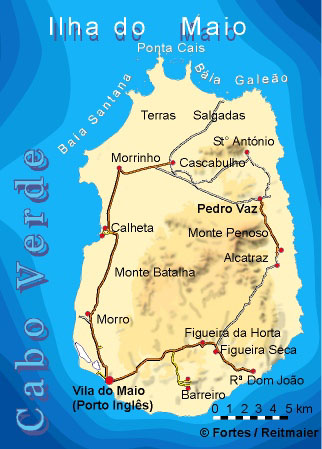
- Baía do Galeão, its location is in the northeast of the island

- Location: Northwest of Maio, Cape Verde
- Coordinates: 15°19′N 23°9′W
- Max. length: 5 kilometres (3.1 mi)

Baía do Galeão is a bay on the north coast of the island of Maio in Cape Verde. The nearest village is Cascabulho, 5 kilometres (3.1 mi) to the south. The bay was mentioned as "Ghelloons" in the 1747 map by Jacques-Nicolas Bellin.
