= Baía da Santana =

Bay in Cape Verde

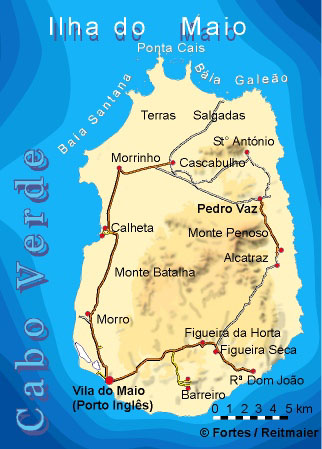
- Baía da Santana, its location is in the northwest of the island

- Location: Northwest of Maio, Cape Verde
- Coordinates: 15.289°N 23.206°W

Baía da Santana (Portuguese meaning Saint Anne's bay) is a bay on the northwest coast of the island of Maio in Cape Verde. The nearest village is Morrinho, about 2 km to the south.
