= San Antonio District =

San Antonio District may refer to:

In the United States:

- San Antonio, Oakland, California

In Costa Rica:

- San Antonio District, Alajuela (in Alajuela (canton), Alajuela province)
- San Antonio District, Alajuelita (in Alajuelita (canton), San José province)
- San Antonio District, Belén (in Belén (canton), Heredia province)
- San Antonio District, Desamparados (in Desamparados (canton), San José province)
- San Antonio District, Escazú (in Escazú (canton), San José province)
- San Antonio District, León Cortés (in León Cortés (canton), San José province)
- San Antonio District, Nicoya (in Nicoya (canton), Guanacaste province)
- San Antonio District, Puriscal (in Puriscal (canton), San José province)

In Peru:

- San Antonio District, Cañete
- San Antonio District, Huarochirí
