= San Antonio, Paclín =

Coordinates: 28°02′S 65°41′W

San Antonio (Paclín)
- Municipality and village
- Interactive map of San Antonio (Paclín)
- Country: Argentina
- Province: Catamarca Province
- Time zone: UTC−3 (ART)

San Antonio (Paclín) is a village and municipality in Catamarca Province in northwestern Argentina.
