= Santo Antônio, Carira =

Santo Antônio
- Village
- Location of Carira in Sergipe

- Location within Brazil
- Coordinates: 10°18′6″S 37°39′56″W
- Country: Brazil
- State: Sergipe
- Municipality: Carira
- Elevation: 327 m (1,073 ft)
- Population (2022): 140

Santo Antônio (Brazilian Portuguese pronunciation: [ˈsɐ̃ntʊ ɐ̃ntõnjʊ or sɐ̃ntɐ̃nˈtõj̃]) is a village in the municipality of Carira, state of Sergipe, in northeastern Brazil. As of 2022 it had a population of 140. It is named after Saint Anthony of Padua.

== See also ==
- List of villages in Sergipe
