= Santo Antônio do Caiuá =

- Municipality
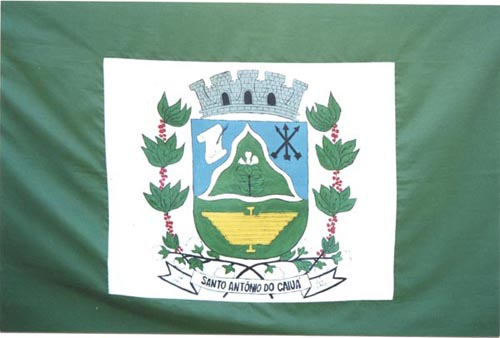
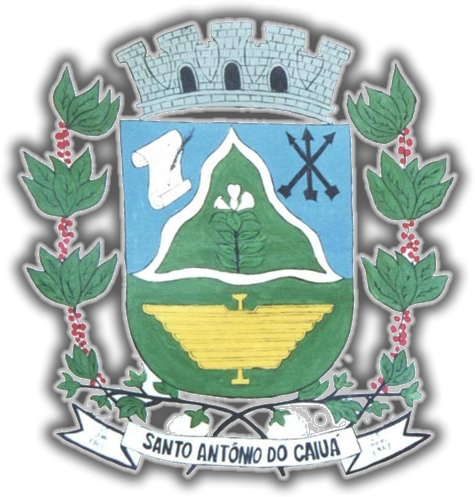
- Flag Coat of arms

- Location in Paraná state

- Location in Brazil
- Coordinates: 22°44′6″S 52°20′31″W
- Country: Brazil
- Region: South
- State: Paraná
- Mesoregion: Noroeste Paranaense
- Microregion: Paranavaí

Area
  - Total: 219.07 km^{2} (84.58 sq mi)

Population (2020)
  - Total: 2,626
  - Density: 11.99/km^{2} (31.05/sq mi)
- Time zone: UTC−3 (BRT)
- Website: www.stoantoniocaiua.pr.gov.br

Santo Antônio do Caiuá is a municipality in the northwestern part of the state of Paraná, Brazil. The population is 2,626 (2020 est.) in an area of 219.07 km^{2}. The municipality was founded in 1961.
