= San Antonio Lake =

San Antonio Lake may refer to the following places:

- Lake San Antonio, California, United States
- San Antonio Lagoon (Bolivia)
- San Antonio Lagoon (Peru), Huanta District
