= Barreiro, Cape Verde =

Barreiro
- Settlement
- Coordinates: 15.135°N 23.161°W
- Country: Cape Verde
- Island: Maio
- Municipality: Maio
- Civil parish: Nossa Senhora da Luz

Population (2010)
  - Total: 535
- ID: 61101

Barreiro is a town in the southern part of the island of Maio, Cape Verde. It is around 5 km east of the island capital Porto Inglês. At the 2010 census, its population was 535.

== See also ==
- List of cities and towns in Cape Verde
