= Pedro Vaz, Cape Verde =

Pedro Vaz
- Settlement
- Coordinates: 15.249°N 23.115°W
- Country: Cape Verde
- Island: Maio
- Municipality: Maio
- Civil parish: Nossa Senhora da Luz
- Elevation: 36 m (118 ft)

Population (2010)
  - Total: 166
- ID: 61107

Pedro Vaz is a settlement in the northeast of the island of Maio in Cape Verde. It is located 3.5 km north of Alcatraz and 16 km northeast of the island capital Porto Inglês.

== See also ==
- List of villages and settlements in Cape Verde
