= Santo Antônio de Lisboa, Piauí =

Santo Antônio de Lisboa
- Municipality
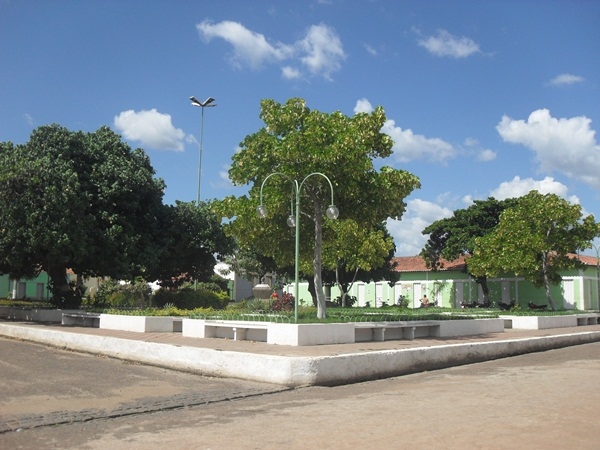

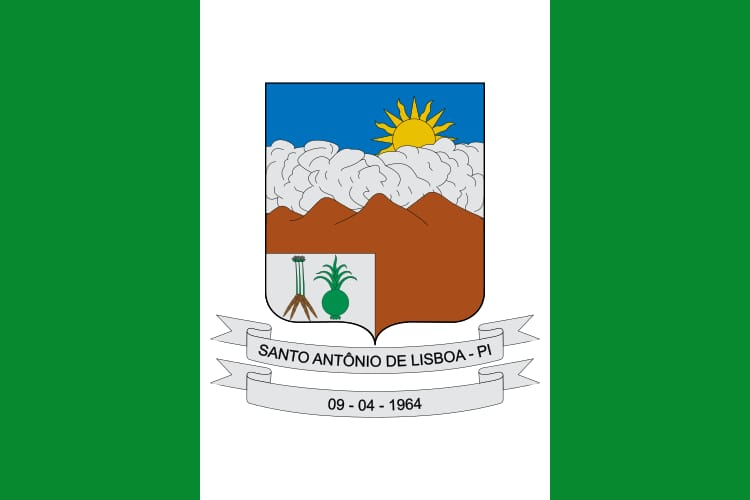
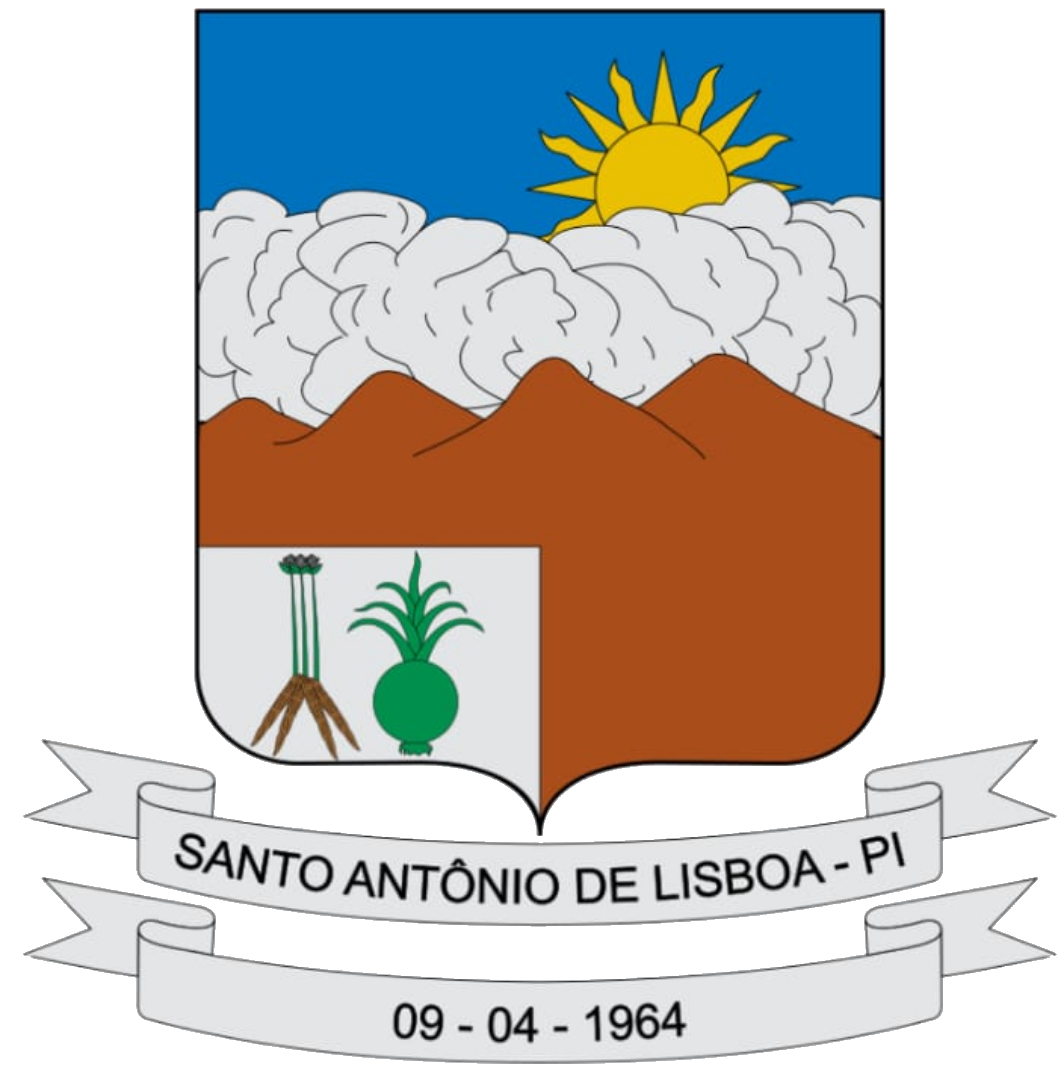
- Flag Coat of arms

- Location in Piauí state

- Location in Brazil
- Coordinates: 6°58′53″S 41°14′3″W
- Country: Brazil
- State: Piauí

Area
  - Total: 387.40 km^{2} (149.58 sq mi)

Population (2020)
  - Total: 6,441
  - Density: 16.63/km^{2} (43.06/sq mi)
- Time zone: UTC−3 (BRT)

Santo Antônio do Lisboa (Portuguese meaning Saint Anthony of Lisbon) is a town in the eastcentral part of the state of Piauí, Brazil. The population is 6,441 (2020 est.) in an area of 387.40 km². Its elevation is 237 m.

== Population history ==
Year	Population
2004	5,196
2006	5,214
2015	6,244
2020	6,441
