= Saint-Antoine =

Saint-Antoine may refer to the following places:

== Canada ==
- Saint-Antoine, New Brunswick, a neighborhood in the town of Champdoré
- Saint-Antoine-de-l'Isle-aux-Grues, Quebec, a parish in Chaudière-Appalaches
- Saint-Antoine-de-Tilly, Quebec, a municipality in Chaudière-Appalaches
- Saint-Antoine-sur-Richelieu, Quebec, a municipality in Montérégie

== France ==
- Saint-Antoine, Cantal, a commune in the department of Cantal
- Saint-Antoine, Doubs, a commune in the department of Doubs
- Saint-Antoine, Gers, a commune in the department of Gers
- Saint-Antoine, Gironde, a former commune in the department of Gironde
- Saint-Antoine hospital, at Pierre and Marie Curie University
- Faubourg Saint-Antoine, one of the traditional suburbs of Paris, now part of the 11th and 12th arrondissements.

== Switzerland ==
- Saint-Antoine, the French name for St. Antoni, in the canton of Fribourg

== See also ==
- Saint Anthony (disambiguation)
