= Antoine (automobile) =

Overview
- Manufacturer: Liège
- Production: 1900-1903
- Designer: Victor Antoine

The Antoine was a Belgian automobile manufactured by Victor Antoine of Liège, an engine manufacturer, from 1900 to 1903. At least two models were offered. One was a 4 hp (3.0 kW) voiturette. The other, offered in 1903, was a 15/25 hp car.
