= San Antonio, Tolima =

Coordinates: 3°55′N 75°30′W

- Municipality and town
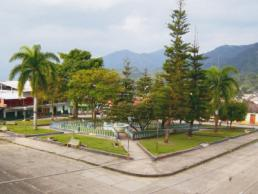
- Parque Central San Antonio

- Flag Coat of arms

- Location of the municipality and town of San Antonio, Tolima in the Tolima Department of Colombia.
- Country: Colombia
- Department: Tolima Department

Government
  - mayor: José Dayler Lasso Mosquera

Area
  - Total: 389 km^{2} (150 sq mi)
- Elevation: 1,492 m (4,895 ft)

Population (2015)
  - Total: 14,400
- Time zone: UTC-5 (Colombia Standard Time)

San Antonio is a municipality in the Tolima department of Colombia. The population of the municipality was 16,282 as of the 1993 census.

== Climate ==
Climate data for San Antonio (San Antonio Quinta), elevation 1,500 m (4,900 ft), (1981–2010)
Month	Jan	Feb	Mar	Apr	May	Jun	Jul	Aug	Sep	Oct	Nov	Dec	Year
Mean daily maximum °C (°F)	25.5 (77.9)	26.0 (78.8)	25.9 (78.6)	25.8 (78.4)	25.7 (78.3)	25.8 (78.4)	26.1 (79.0)	26.8 (80.2)	27.0 (80.6)	25.6 (78.1)	25.1 (77.2)	25.2 (77.4)	25.9 (78.6)
Daily mean °C (°F)	21.2 (70.2)	21.4 (70.5)	21.5 (70.7)	21.4 (70.5)	21.5 (70.7)	21.5 (70.7)	21.6 (70.9)	22.0 (71.6)	22.0 (71.6)	21.2 (70.2)	20.9 (69.6)	21.0 (69.8)	21.4 (70.5)
Mean daily minimum °C (°F)	16.2 (61.2)	16.2 (61.2)	16.6 (61.9)	16.7 (62.1)	16.7 (62.1)	16.6 (61.9)	16.3 (61.3)	16.5 (61.7)	16.3 (61.3)	16.3 (61.3)	16.3 (61.3)	16.3 (61.3)	16.4 (61.5)
Average precipitation mm (inches)	105.0 (4.13)	146.2 (5.76)	195.0 (7.68)	254.0 (10.00)	240.9 (9.48)	136.9 (5.39)	119.2 (4.69)	107.5 (4.23)	180.4 (7.10)	231.9 (9.13)	189.6 (7.46)	130.0 (5.12)	2,036.5 (80.18)
Average precipitation days	16	16	20	23	23	18	16	14	17	22	21	18	222
Average relative humidity (%)	77	76	78	79	78	76	72	70	70	77	80	79	76
Mean monthly sunshine hours	170.5	141.2	136.4	126.0	148.8	147.0	158.1	161.2	150.0	151.9	135.0	167.4	1,793.5
Mean daily sunshine hours	5.5	5.0	4.4	4.2	4.8	4.9	5.1	5.2	5.0	4.9	4.5	5.4	4.9
Source: Instituto de Hidrologia Meteorologia y Estudios Ambientales
