= Cascabulho =

- Settlement
- Coordinates: 15.270°N 23.172°W
- Country: Cape Verde
- Island: Maio
- Municipality: Maio
- Civil parish: Nossa Senhora da Luz
- Elevation: 20 m (66 ft)

Population (2010)
  - Total: 204
- ID: 61103

Cascabulho is a village in the northern part of the island of Maio in Cape Verde. In 2010 its population was 204. It is located 15 km northeast of the island capital Porto Inglês. Further north is the nature reserve Terras Salgadas.

== See also ==
- List of villages and settlements in Cape Verde
