= San Antonio (Asunción) =

- Barrio
- Interactive map of San Antonio
- Country: Paraguay
- Autonomous Capital District: Gran Asunción
- City: Asunción

Area
  - Total: 1.48 km^{2} (0.57 sq mi)
- Elevation: 43 m (141 ft)

Population
  - Total: 11,460

San Antonio is a neighbourhood (barrio) of Asunción, Paraguay.
