= San Antonio de La Paz =

Coordinates: 28°56′S 65°06′W

- Municipality and village
- Interactive map of San Antonio de La Paz
- Country: Argentina
- Province: Catamarca Province
- Department: La Paz
- Elevation: 843 ft (257 m)

Population (2010)
  - Total: 1,835
- Time zone: UTC−3 (ART)

San Antonio de La Paz is a village and municipality in Catamarca Province in northwestern Argentina.
