= Maio, Cape Verde =

Island of Cape Verde

Maio
Native name: Djarmai
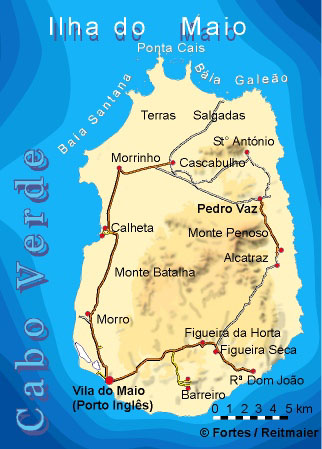

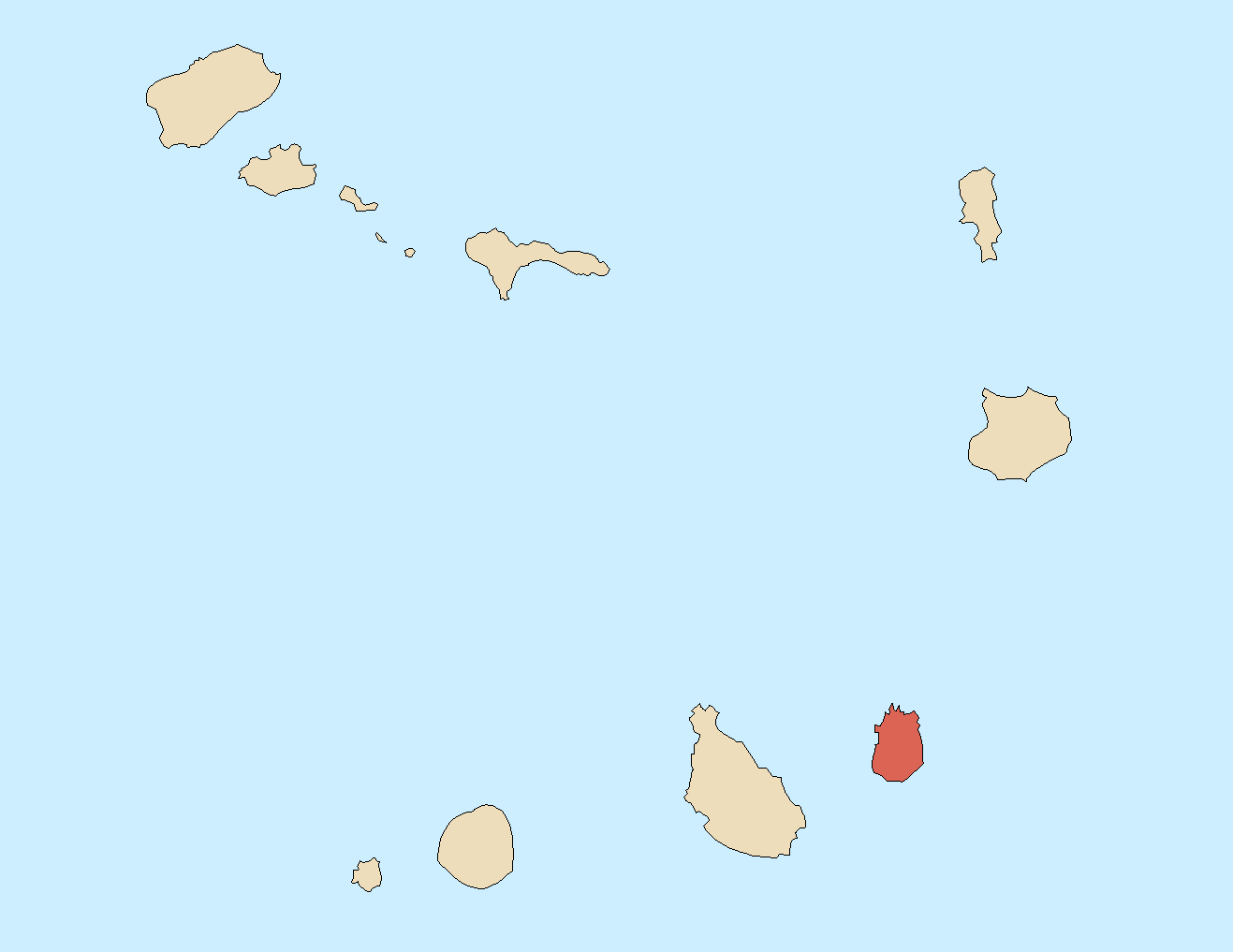

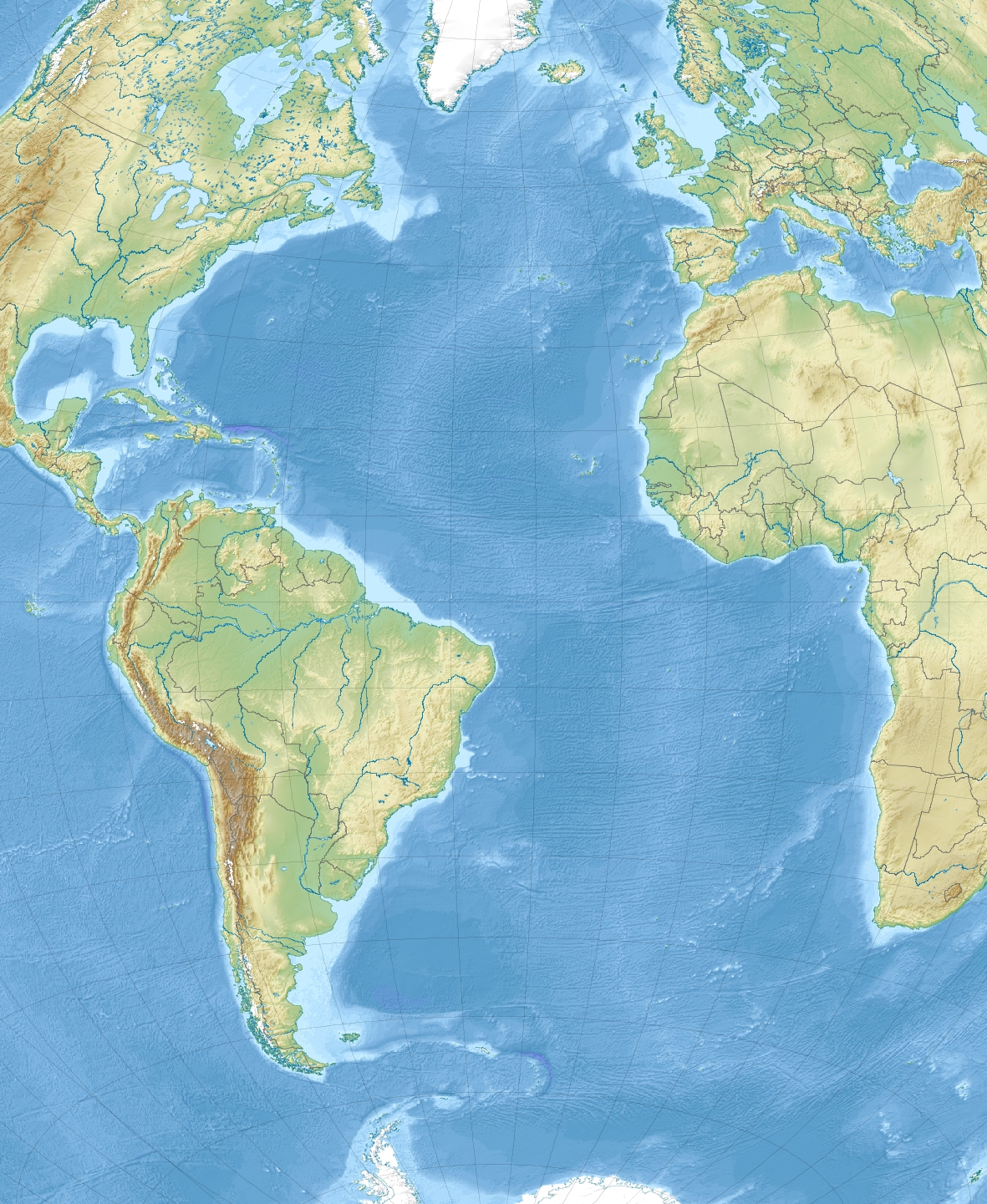
- Location within Cape Verde Location within Atlantic Ocean

Geography
- Location: Atlantic Ocean
- Coordinates: 15°13′N 23°10′W
- Area: 274.5 km^{2} (106.0 sq mi)
- Length: 24.1 km (14.98 mi)
- Width: 16.3 km (10.13 mi)
- Highest elevation: 436 m (1430 ft)
- Highest point: Monte Penoso

Administration
- Cape Verde
- Municipality: Maio
- Largest settlement: Porto Inglês

Demographics
- Demonym: Maiense
- Population: 6980 (2015)
- Pop. density: 25.4/km^{2} (65.8/sq mi)

Additional information
- Official website: www.municipiodomaio.cv

Maio (Portuguese for "May") is the easternmost of the Sotavento islands of Cape Verde. Maio is located south of the island of Boa Vista and east of Santiago. Administratively, the island forms one concelho (municipality): Maio.

== History ==
The island was discovered in 1460. It was first settled at the end of the 16th century, when the land was used to raise livestock, especially goats. Salt was first exploited in the 17th century which caused the population to grow. The English exported salt to Europe from Porto Inglês, hence the name of that city.

The inconclusive Battle of Maio was fought between British and French frigate squadrons off the island's southern coast on 23 January 1814 in the last stages of the Napoleonic Wars. Due to persisting drought many inhabitants emigrated from Maio in the 20th century.

== Geography ==
The island has an area of 274.5 km^{2}. It is 24.1 km long and 16.3 km wide. The tallest mountain on the island (436 m) is near the east coast, in a mountain range named Monte Penoso. Terras Salgadas is a salty plain in the far north. The northernmost point on the island is Ponta Cais. 20% of the island area (54.5 km^{2}) is forested and 28% of the island area (76.0 km^{2}) is a protected area. Bays includes Baía do Galeão and Baía da Santana to the north and in the southeast is a lagoon named Lagoa Cimidor. The uninhabited islet Ilhéu Laje Branca lies near its north coast. The island's main town is Porto Inglês, near which its airport, Maio Airport lies.

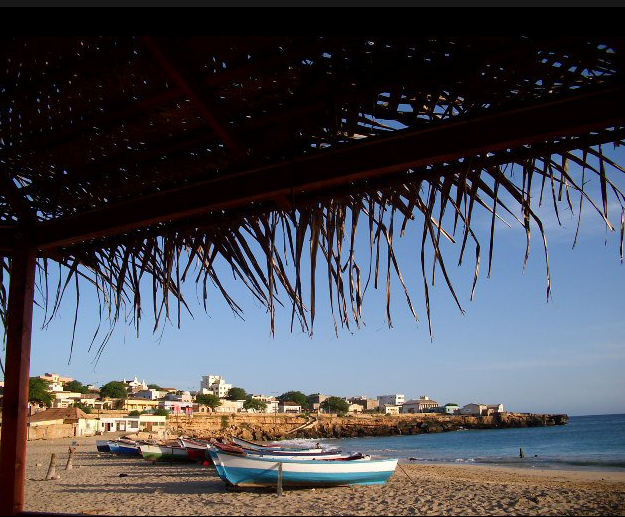
City of Porto Inglês at sunset

== Municipality ==
Administratively, the island of Maio is covered by one municipality, Concelho do Maio. This municipality consists of one freguesia (civil parish), Nossa Senhora da Luz, which also covers the whole island. The freguesia is subdivided into the following settlements:

- Alcatraz
- Barreiro (town)
- Calheta (town)
- Cascabulho
- Figueira
- Morro
- Morrinho
- Pedro Vaz
- Pilão Cão
- Porto Inglês (city)
- Praia Gonçalo
- Ribeira Dom João
- Santo António

=== Politics ===
Since 2004, the Movement for Democracy (MpD) is the ruling party of the municipality. The results of the latest elections, in 2016:

Party	Municipal Council		Municipal Assembly	
Party	Votes%	Seats	Votes%	Seats
MpD	56.82	5	55.92	8
OIAM	40.51	0	41.07	5

== Population ==
In the 1830s, the population was estimated at 2,500. Most people in Maio are Roman Catholic.

Population of Maio (1940—2015)
Year	Population
1940	2,237
1950	1,924
1960	2,680
1970	3,466
1980	4,098
1990	4,969
2000	6,742
2010	6,952
2015	6,980

== Economy ==
The island prospered around salt collecting in its early days of colonialism, with a little agriculture and grazing.

There are two types of agriculture practiced in Maio, rain fed and irrigated. During the raining season products as corn, beans, pumpkins and melons are being cultivated. Products that farmers cultivate year round are sweet potato, cassava, papaya, fig, coconut and tamarind. Goats, cows, pigs, chickens and donkeys are common on the island. Few people own a horse. Scarcity of water is the biggest problem for the locals.

Fishery is important and abundantly available. Tuna, sailfish and different coral fishes such as the coral hind are caught.

The economy is heavily supported by migrants who send money to their family on the island.

== Sports ==
Football is by far the most popular sport, but basketball and futsal along with water sports as surfing, diving and swimming are becoming more popular.

== Notable people ==
- Maria Helena da Costa Dias, Cape Verdean born Portuguese writer and translator
- Edy Tavares, basketball player
- Horace Silver, jazz pianist, composer, and arranger
- Joana Rosa, politician. Minister of Justice of Cape Verde (2021- )
