= Calheta, Cape Verde =

Calheta
- Settlement
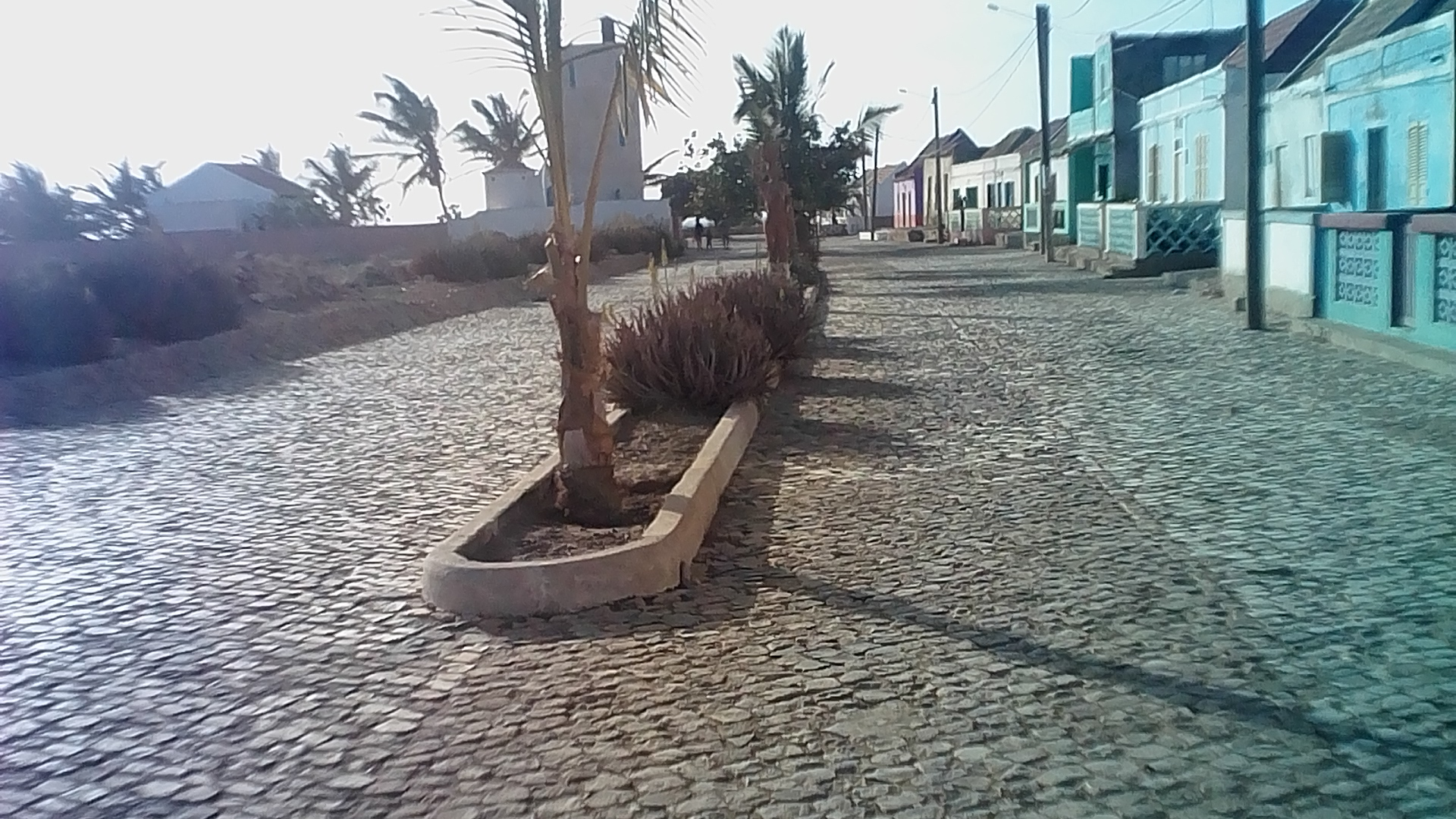
- Calheta's main street

- Location within Cape Verde
- Coordinates: 15.230°N 23.212°W
- Country: Cape Verde
- Island: Maio
- Municipality: Maio
- Civil parish: Nossa Senhora da Luz
- Elevation: 6 m (20 ft)

Population (2010)
  - Total: 1,156
- ID: 61102

Calheta is a town in the western part of the island of Maio. It is situated on the Atlantic coast, around 11 km north of the island capital Porto Inglês and 6 km north of Morro. Its population at the 2010 census was 1,156, making it the island's second most populous settlement. The settlement was mentioned as "Kalyete" in the 1747 map by Jacques-Nicolas Bellin.

== See also ==
- List of cities and towns in Cape Verde
