= Rancho San Antonio =

Rancho San Antonio may refer to:

- Rancho San Antonio (Lugo), a Spanish land grant in present-day Los Angeles County, California
- Rancho San Antonio (Peralta), a Spanish land grant in present-day Alameda County, California
- Yorba Hacienda or Rancho San Antonio, the adobe house of Bernardo Yorba on his Rancho Cañón de Santa Ana
- Rancho San Antonio (Mesa), a Mexican land grant in present-day Santa Clara County, California
- Rancho San Antonio County Park, a Santa Clara county park, located on the former Mexican land grant in present-day Santa Clara County, California
- Rancho San Antonio Open Space Preserve, a Midpeninsula Regional Open Space Preserve, adjacent to the county park, located on the former Mexican land grant in present-day Santa Clara County, California

== See also ==
- San Antonio Los Ranchos - a municipality in El Salvador
