= San Antonio River (disambiguation) =

The San Antonio River is a major waterway in Texas, United States.

San Antonio River may also refer to:

- San Antonio River (California), in Monterey County, California, United States
- San Antonio River (Mexico)
- San Antonio River (South America), forming part of the border between Argentina and Brazil
- San Antonio River (Peru), in Rodríguez de Mendoza Province
- Rio San Antonio (Colorado–New Mexico)
