= Santo António (Maio) =

- Settlement
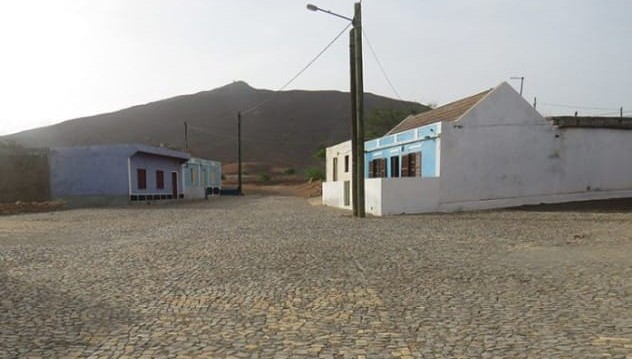

- Location within Cape Verde
- Coordinates: 15.275°N 23.123°W
- Country: Cape Verde
- Island: Maio
- Municipality: Maio
- Civil parish: Nossa Senhora da Luz

Population (2010)
  - Total: 22
- ID: 61113

Santo António (Portuguese meaning Saint Anthony) is a village in the northeastern part of the island of Maio. It is located 18 km northeast of the island capital Porto Inglês.

== See also ==
- List of villages and settlements in Cape Verde
