= Santo Antônio dos Milagres =

- Municipality
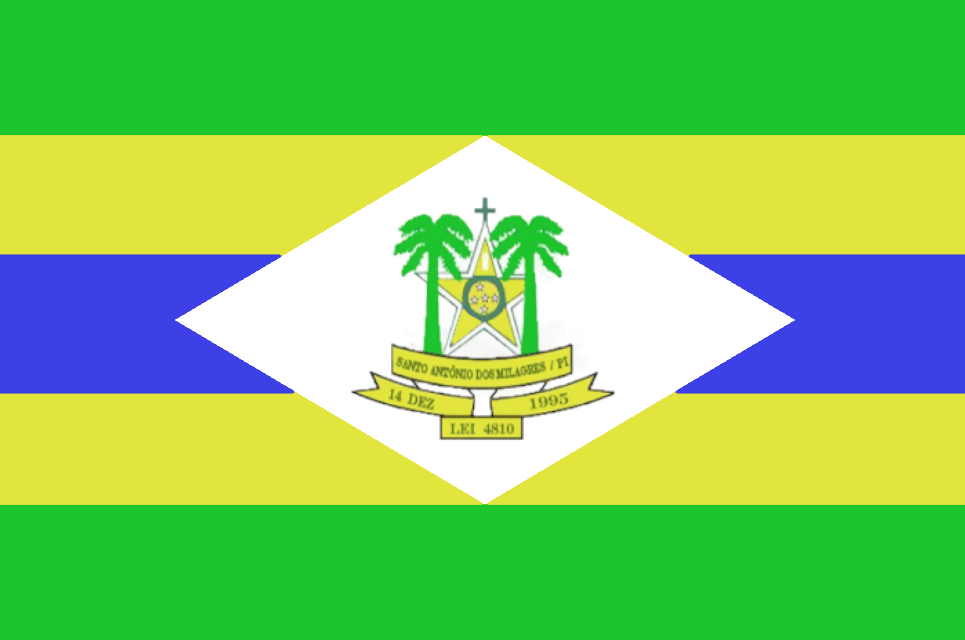
- Flag

- Location in Piauí state

- Location in Brazil
- Coordinates: 6°2′49″S 42°42′36″W
- Country: Brazil
- Region: Northeast
- State: Piauí

Government
  - Mayor: Raimundo Francisco Neves de Sousa

Area
  - Total: 33.15 km^{2} (12.80 sq mi)
- Elevation: 240 m (790 ft)

Population (2020)
  - Total: 2,166
  - Density: 65.34/km^{2} (169.2/sq mi)
- Time zone: UTC−3 (BRT)
- Postal code: 64438-xxx

Santo Antônio dos Milagres (Portuguese meaning "Saint Anthony of the Miracles") is a municipality in the western part of the state of Piauí, Brazil. The population is 2,166 (2020 est.) in an area of 33.15 km².

== Population history ==
Year	Population
2004	2,004
2006	2,060
2015	2,115
2020	2,166
