= San Antonio River (Peru) =

Coordinates: 6.3953°S 77.5125°W

The San Antonio River is a river in Peru. It is the principal source that supplies the hydroelectric company of the Rodríguez de Mendoza Province.
