= Porto Inglês =

- Settlement
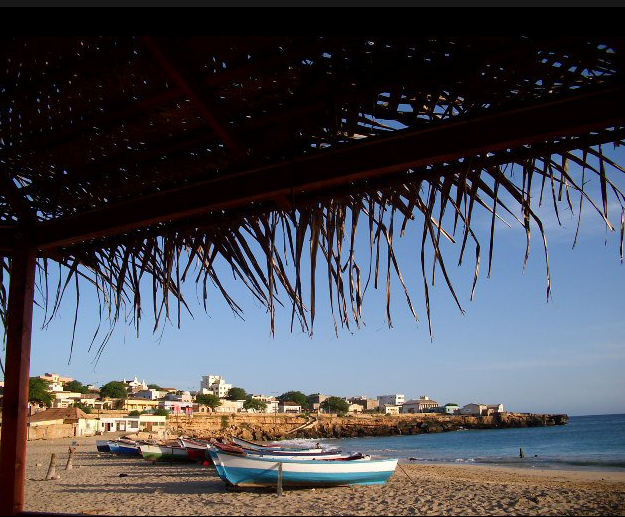

- Location within Cape Verde
- Coordinates: 15.138°N 23.211°W
- Country: Cape Verde
- Island: Maio
- Municipality: Maio
- Civil parish: Nossa Senhora da Luz
- Elevation: 10 m (33 ft)

Population (2010)
  - Total: 2,971
- ID: 61111

Porto Inglês (Portuguese for "English port", also: Cidade do Maio, Vila do Maio) is a city in the southwestern part of the island of Maio in southeastern Cape Verde. It is the main urban settlement of the island, and also seat of the Maio Municipality. Its population was 2,971 in 2010. The name Porto Inglês refers to English ships that exported salt produced on the island of Maio from this town. Salt exploitation continued until the 19th century. The inconclusive Battle of Maio was fought between British and French frigate squadrons close to the town on 23 January 1814 in the last stages of the Napoleonic Wars.

The port of Porto Inglês has ferry services to Praia on the island of Santiago. It is also a member port of the International Association of Ports and Harbors (IAPH). The domestic Maio Airport lies 1 km north of the city.

Landmarks:

- Forte de São José and its adjacent lighthouse
- The Nossa Senhora da Luz (Our Lady of Light) church, opened in 1872
- Salinas of the English Port

== Historical population ==
Historical population
Year	Population
1990 (June 23, Census)	1,573
2000 (June 16, Census)	2,673
2010 (Census)	2,971

== City twinning ==
- Loures, Portugal

== See also ==
- List of cities and towns in Cape Verde
- Tourism in Cape Verde
