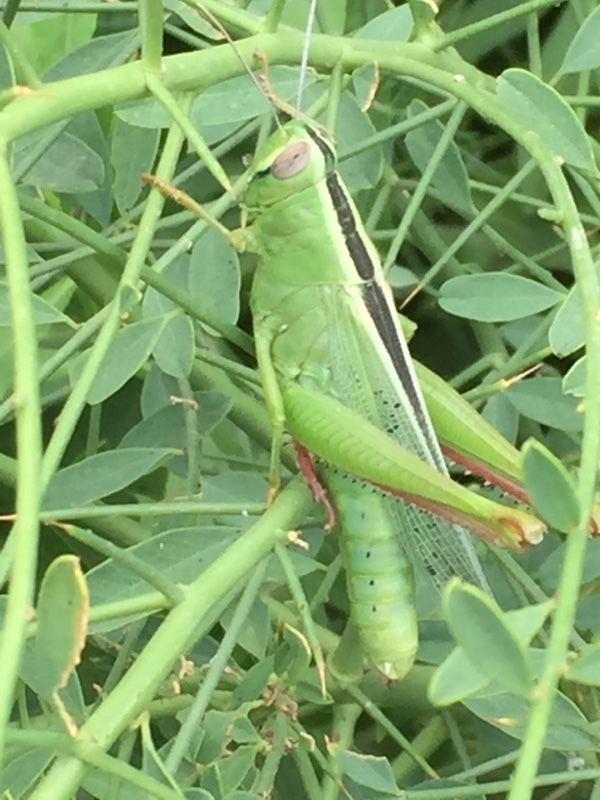
- Heteracris pterosticha, Armenia

Scientific classification
- Kingdom: Animalia
- Phylum: Arthropoda
- Clade: Pancrustacea
- Class: Insecta
- Order: Orthoptera
- Suborder: Caelifera
- Family: Acrididae
- Subfamily: Eyprepocnemidinae
- Tribe: Eyprepocnemidini
- Genus: Heteracris
- Species: H. pterosticha

Binomial name
- Heteracris pterosticha (Fischer von Waldheim, 1833)

= Heteracris pterosticha =

Species of short-horned grasshopper

Heteracris pterosticha is a species of short-horned grasshopper in the family Acrididae. It is found in the Palearctic.
