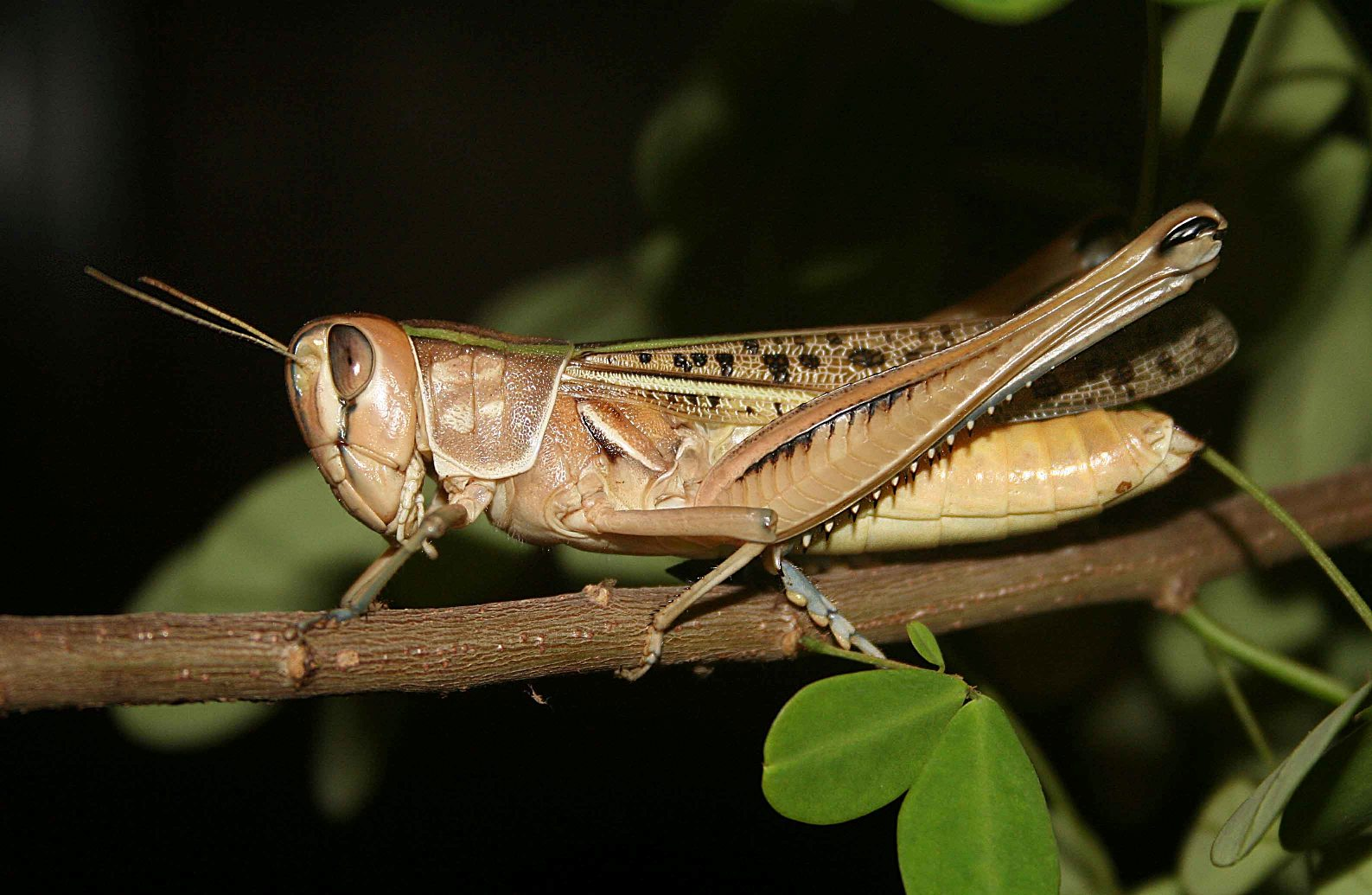

Scientific classification
- Kingdom: Animalia
- Phylum: Arthropoda
- Clade: Pancrustacea
- Class: Insecta
- Order: Orthoptera
- Suborder: Caelifera
- Superfamily: Acridoidea
- Family: Acrididae
- Subfamily: Eyprepocnemidinae
- Genus: Cataloipus
- Species: C. cymbiferus

Binomial name
- Cataloipus cymbiferus (Krauss, 1877)

= Cataloipus cymbiferus =

Species of grasshopper

Cataloipus cymbiferus is a West African species of grasshopper in the family Acrididae. In Mali, it is a pest that frequently attacks the pearl millet.
