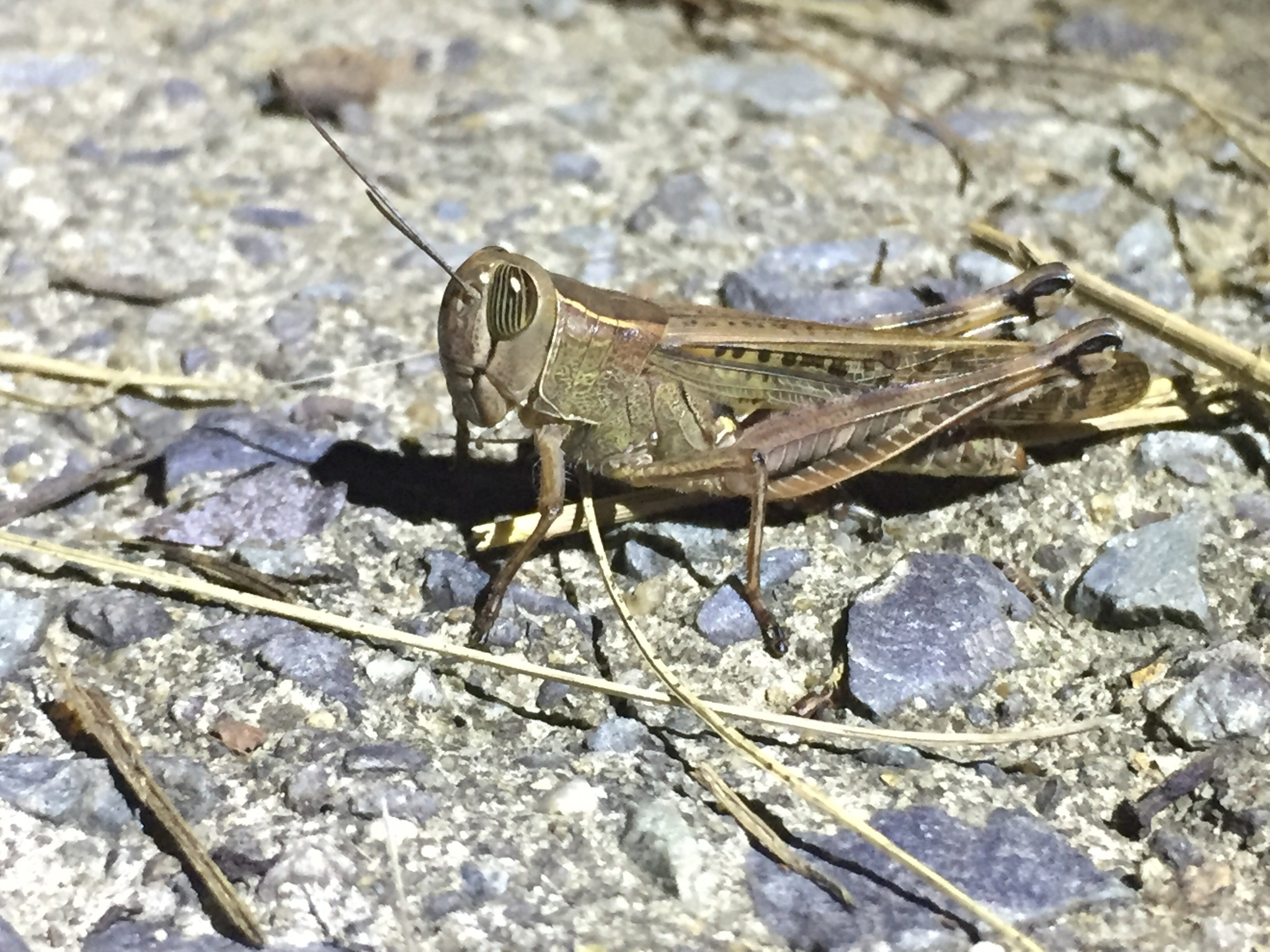
- Shirakiacris shirakii, South Korea
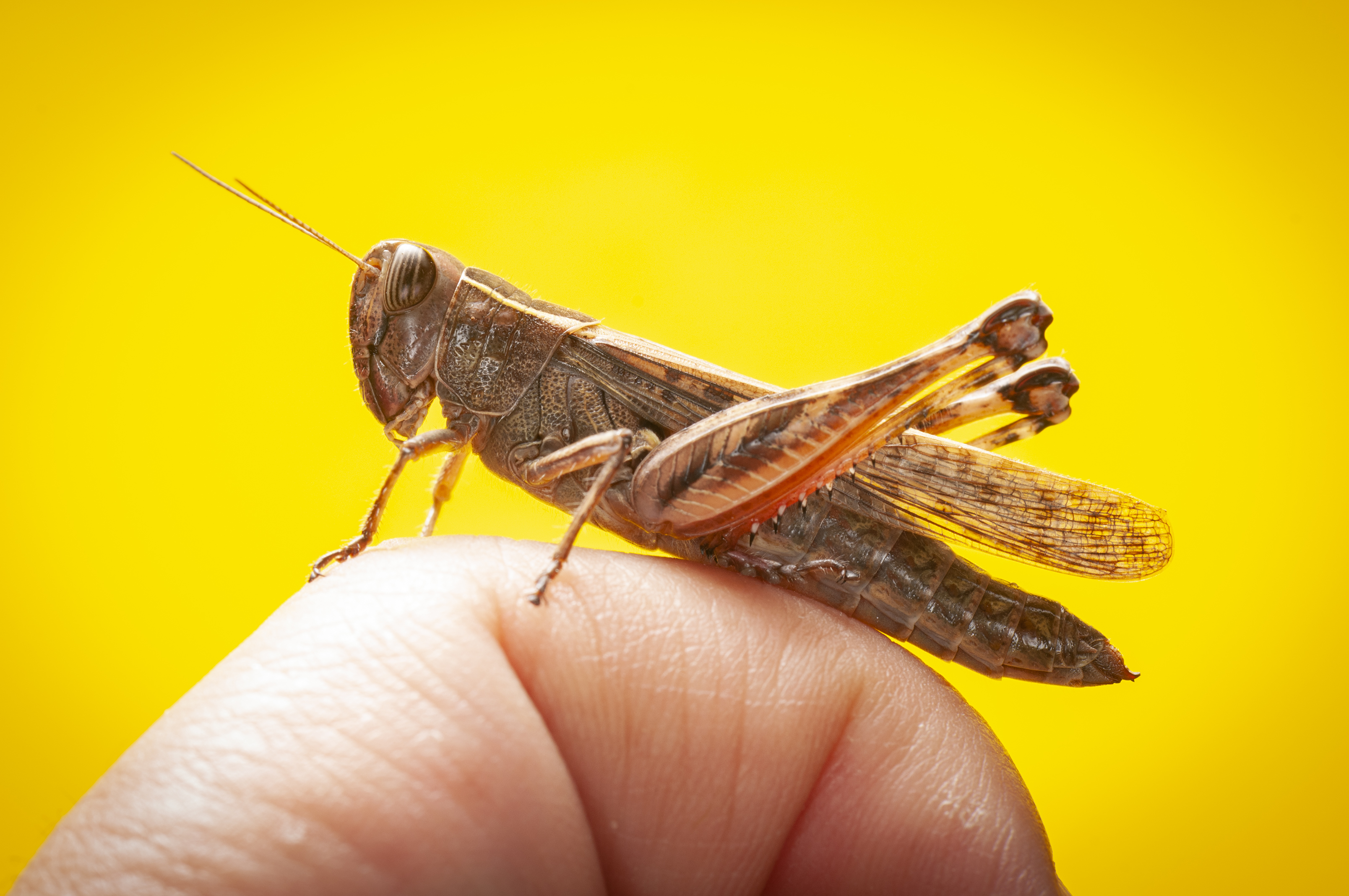
- Shirakiacris shirakii, Adult, South Korea

Scientific classification
- Kingdom: Animalia
- Phylum: Arthropoda
- Clade: Pancrustacea
- Class: Insecta
- Order: Orthoptera
- Suborder: Caelifera
- Family: Acrididae
- Subfamily: Eyprepocnemidinae
- Genus: Shirakiacris
- Species: S. shirakii

Binomial name
- Shirakiacris shirakii (Bolívar, 1914)

= Shirakiacris shirakii =

Species of short-horned grasshopper

Shirakiacris shirakii is a species of short-horned grasshopper in the family Acrididae. It is found in eastern Asia.
