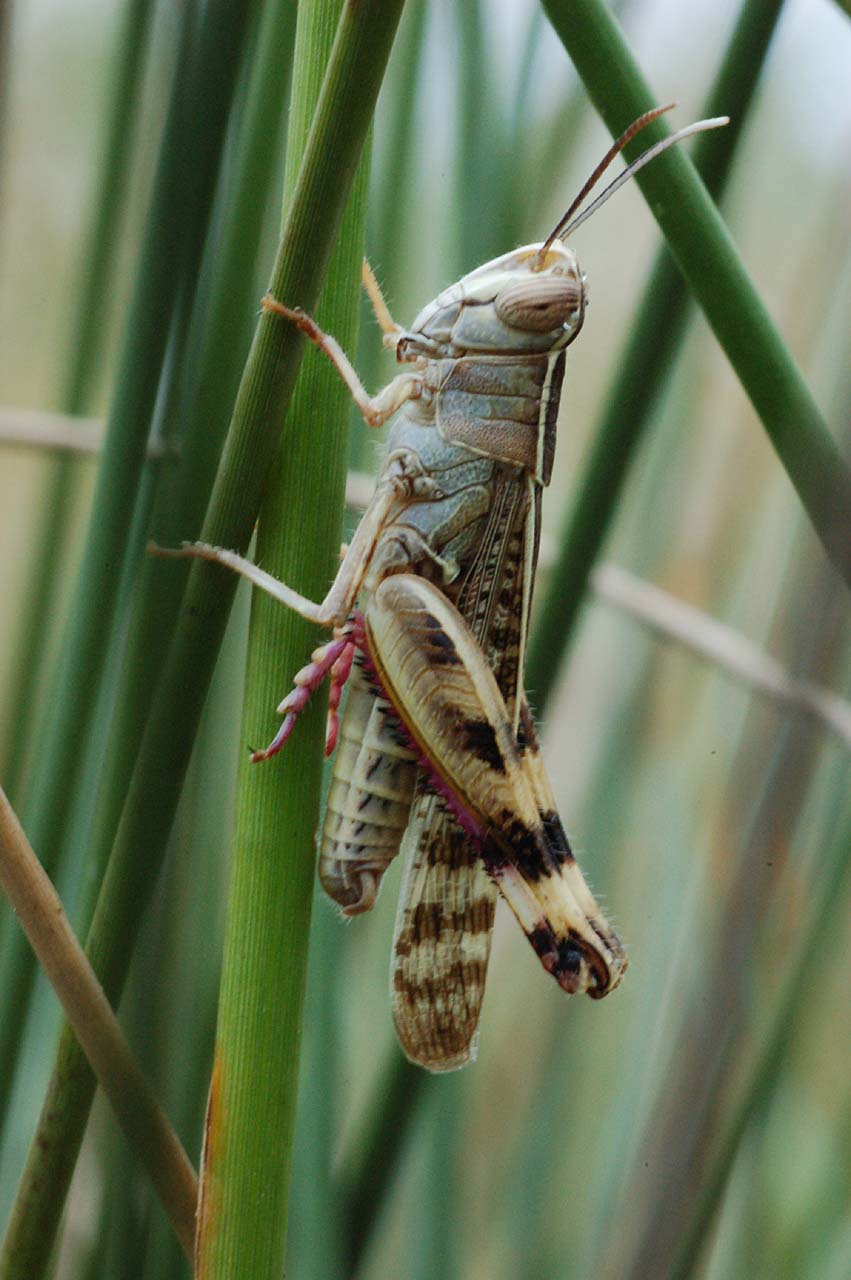
- Heteracris littoralis, Spain

Scientific classification
- Kingdom: Animalia
- Phylum: Arthropoda
- Clade: Pancrustacea
- Class: Insecta
- Order: Orthoptera
- Suborder: Caelifera
- Family: Acrididae
- Subfamily: Eyprepocnemidinae
- Tribe: Eyprepocnemidini
- Genus: Heteracris
- Species: H. littoralis

Binomial name
- Heteracris littoralis (Rambur, 1838)

= Heteracris littoralis =

Species of grasshopper

Heteracris littoralis is a species of short-horned grasshopper in the family Acrididae. It is found in Africa, southern Europe, and Asia.
