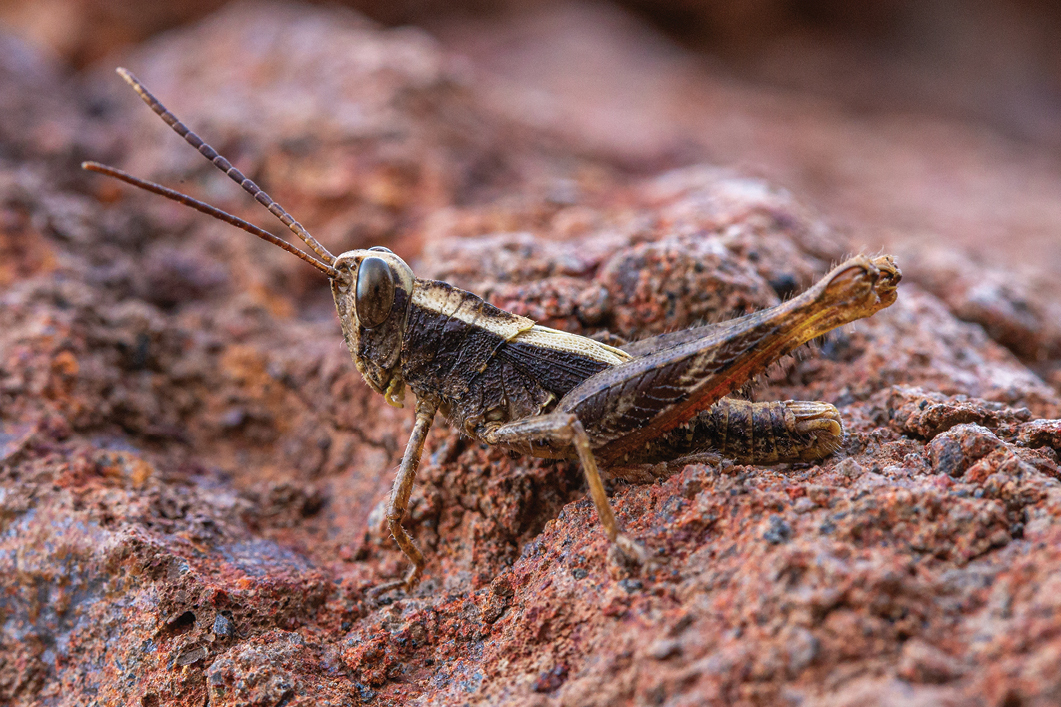
- Eyprepocprifas insularis

Scientific classification
- Kingdom: Animalia
- Phylum: Arthropoda
- Clade: Pancrustacea
- Class: Insecta
- Order: Orthoptera
- Suborder: Caelifera
- Family: Acrididae
- Subfamily: Eyprepocnemidinae
- Genus: Eyprepocprifas; Donskoff, 1982

= Eyprepocprifas =

Genus of grasshoppers

Eyprepocprifas is a genus of grasshoppers in the subfamily Eyprepocnemidinae with the sole species, Monte Gordo grasshopper (Eyprepocprifas insularis) known only from São Nicolau in the Cape Verde Islands.

It was formally described from a single specimen in 1980, declared extinct in 1996, and rediscovered in 2025.

== Description ==
Eyprepocprifas insularis is a small-sized grasshopper, with females growing to an average length of 3.1 cm (1.22 in), while males are smaller, averaging in at around 1.9 cm (0.75 in). Both males and females vary in coloration. The general color is beige-brown. The dorsal part of the head has a dark longitudinal band that runs through the thorax. The hind tibia and hind tarsus is reddish, while the antennae, abdomen, tegmen, lateral thorax, and hind femur are dark brown.

== Distribution and habitat ==
Eyprepocprifas insularis is endemic to Monte Gordo Natural Park in São Nicolau, Cape Verde. It is restricted to 650-1100 m. above sea level. They are found in a mixture of dry to moist soils and can be found in both shrubby and grassy vegetation, along with rocky outcroppings. All sites they were found in have the endemic species Euphorbia tuckeyana, though they are found in areas dominated with Arundo donax, Furcraea gigantea, and Asteriscus smithii, along with Pinus, Eucalyptus, and Cupressus species.
