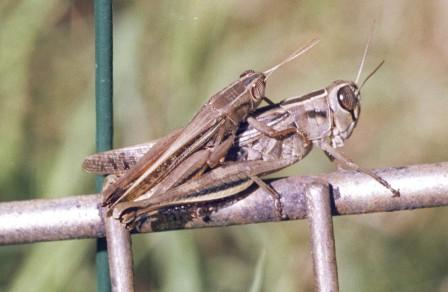
- Eyprepocnemis plorans

Scientific classification
- Kingdom: Animalia
- Phylum: Arthropoda
- Clade: Pancrustacea
- Class: Insecta
- Order: Orthoptera
- Suborder: Caelifera
- Family: Acrididae
- Tribe: Eyprepocnemidini
- Genus: Eyprepocnemis; Fieber, 1853

Synonyms
- Euprepocnemis Stål, 1873

= Eyprepocnemis =

Genus of grasshoppers

Eyprepocnemis is a genus of grasshoppers in the subfamily Eyprepocnemidinae with species found in Africa, Southern Europe through to tropical Asia.

== Species ==
The Catalogue of Life lists:

- Eyprepocnemis aberrans Willemse, 1957
- Eyprepocnemis abyssinica Uvarov, 1921
- Eyprepocnemis alacris Serville, 1838
- Eyprepocnemis bhadurii Bhowmik, 1965
- Eyprepocnemis brachyptera Bruner, 1910
- Eyprepocnemis burmana Ramme, 1941
- Eyprepocnemis burtti Dirsh, 1958
- Eyprepocnemis calceata Serville, 1838
- Eyprepocnemis chloropus Ramme, 1952
- Eyprepocnemis cinerea Blanchard, 1853
- Eyprepocnemis cyanescens Uvarov, 1942
- Eyprepocnemis deserticolus Uvarov, 1933
- Eyprepocnemis djeboboensis Jago, 1962
- Eyprepocnemis dorsalensis Roy, 1964
- Eyprepocnemis hokutensis Shiraki, 1910
- Eyprepocnemis javana Willemse, 1933
- Eyprepocnemis kalkudensis Henry, 1937
- Eyprepocnemis keniensis Johnston, 1937
- Eyprepocnemis montana Chopard, 1945
- Eyprepocnemis montigena Johnston, 1937
- Eyprepocnemis noxia Dirsh, 1950
- Eyprepocnemis perbrevipennis Bi & Xia, 1984
- Eyprepocnemis phronusa Brancsik, 1893
- Eyprepocnemis plorans Charpentier, 1825 - type species (as Gryllus plorans Charpentier = E. plorans plorans)
- Eyprepocnemis pulchra Bolívar, 1902
- Eyprepocnemis poggii Massa, 2018
- Eyprepocnemis reducta Johnsen, 1984
- Eyprepocnemis rentzi Balderson & Yin, 1987
- Eyprepocnemis roseus Uvarov, 1942
- Eyprepocnemis schultzei Roy, 1964
- Eyprepocnemis schulzei Roy, 1964
- Eyprepocnemis smaragdipes Bruner, 1910
- Eyprepocnemis unicolor Tarbinsky, 1928
- Eyprepocnemis vulcanigena Jago, 1962
- Eyprepocnemis yunkweiensis Chang, 1937
- Eyprepocnemis yunnanensis Zheng, Lian & Xi, 1982

== Gallery ==
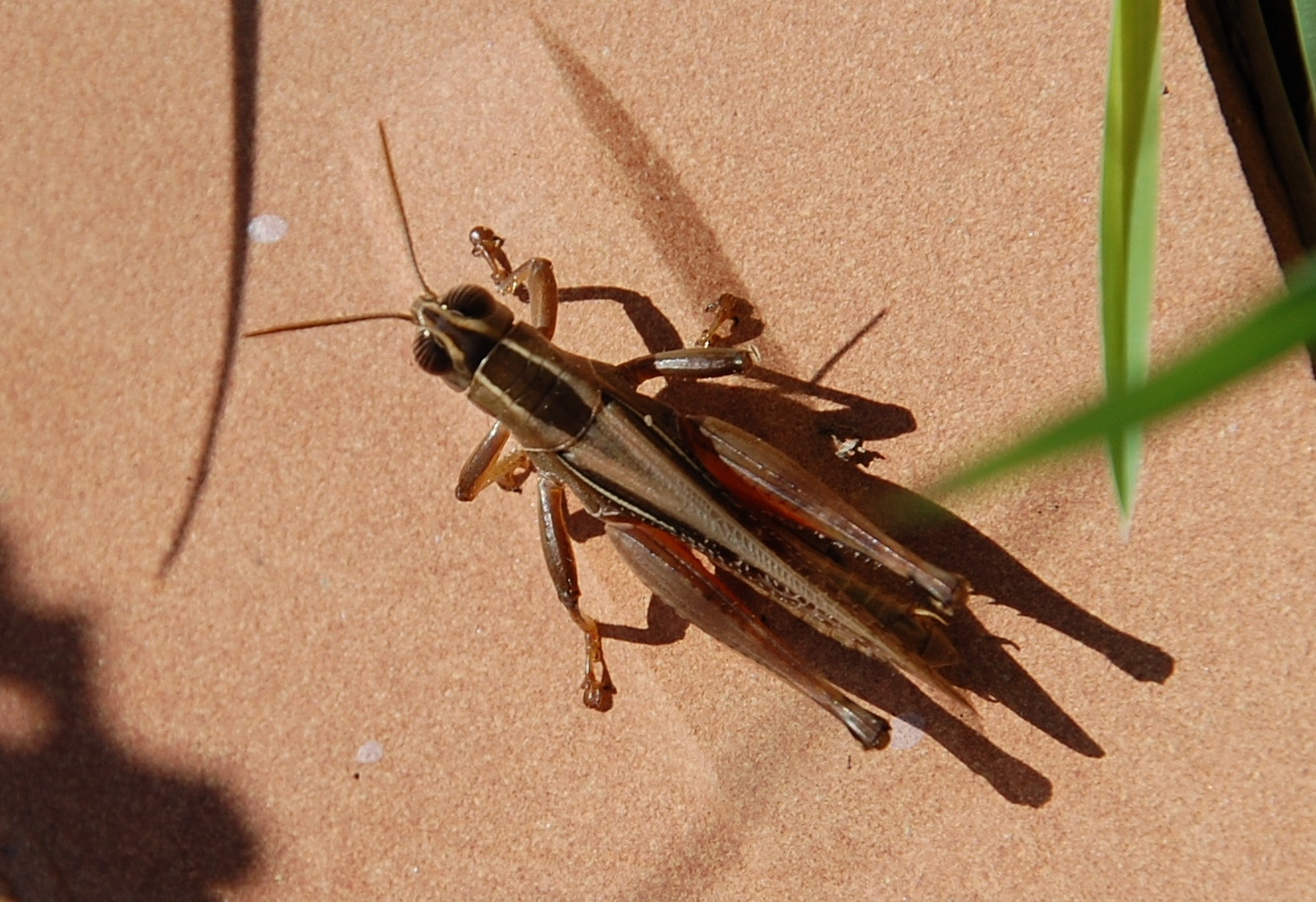

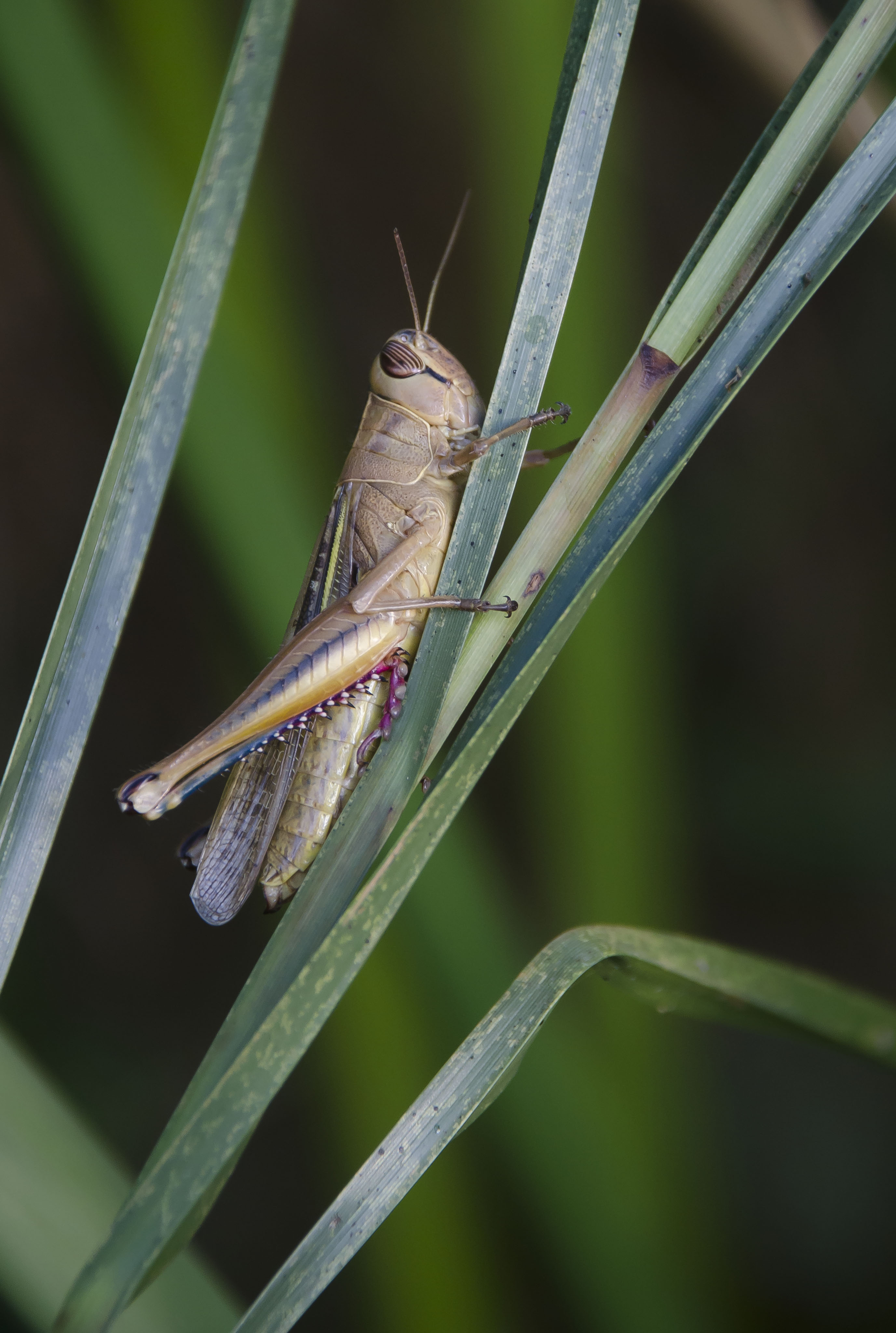

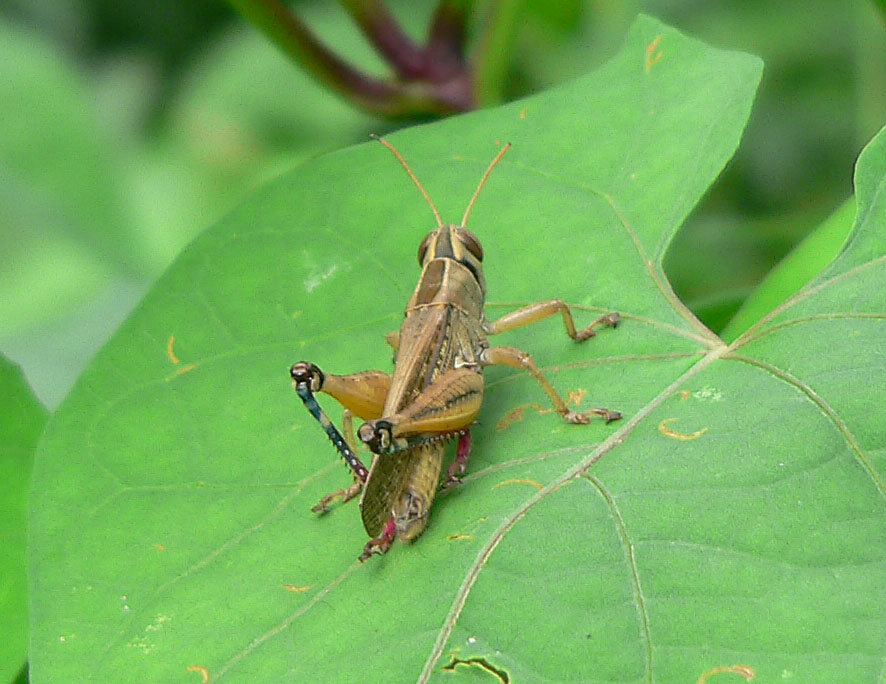

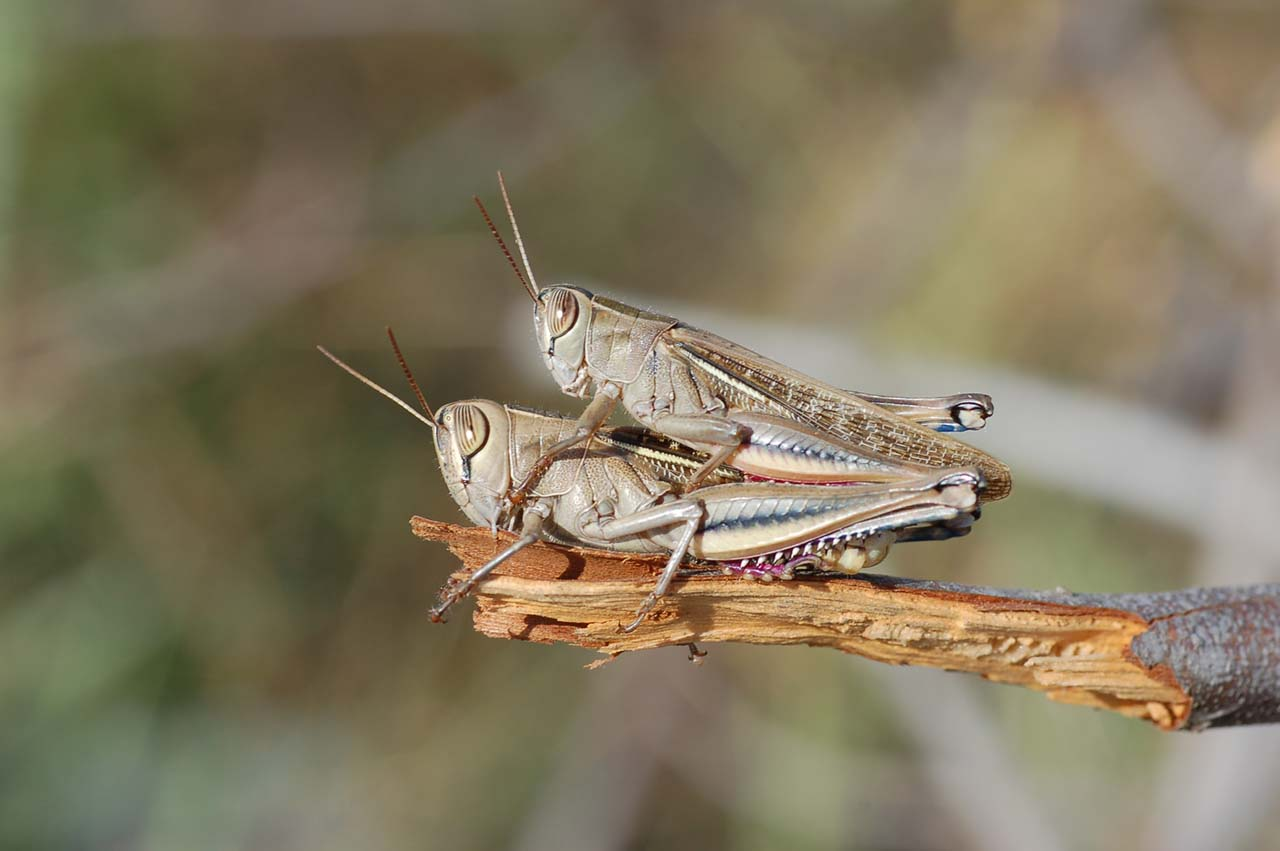

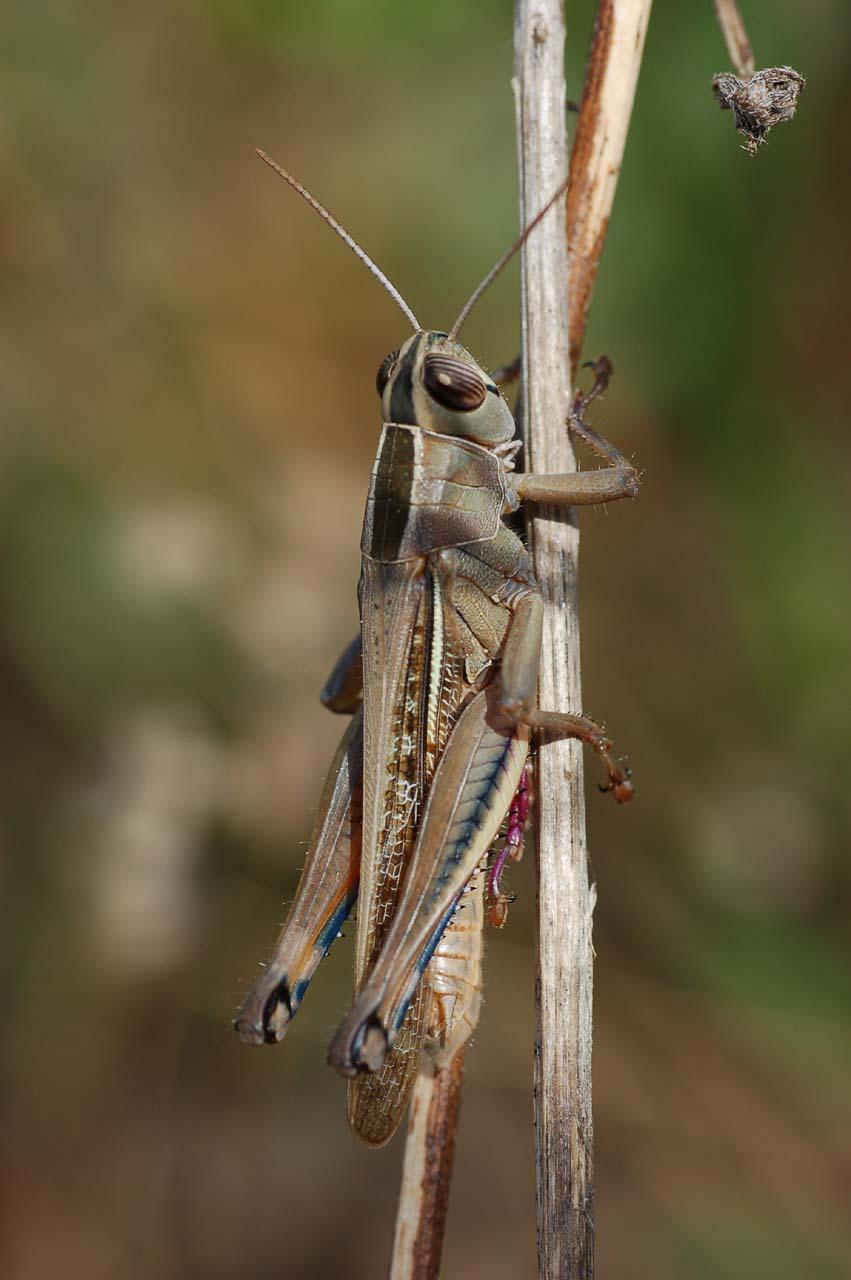
