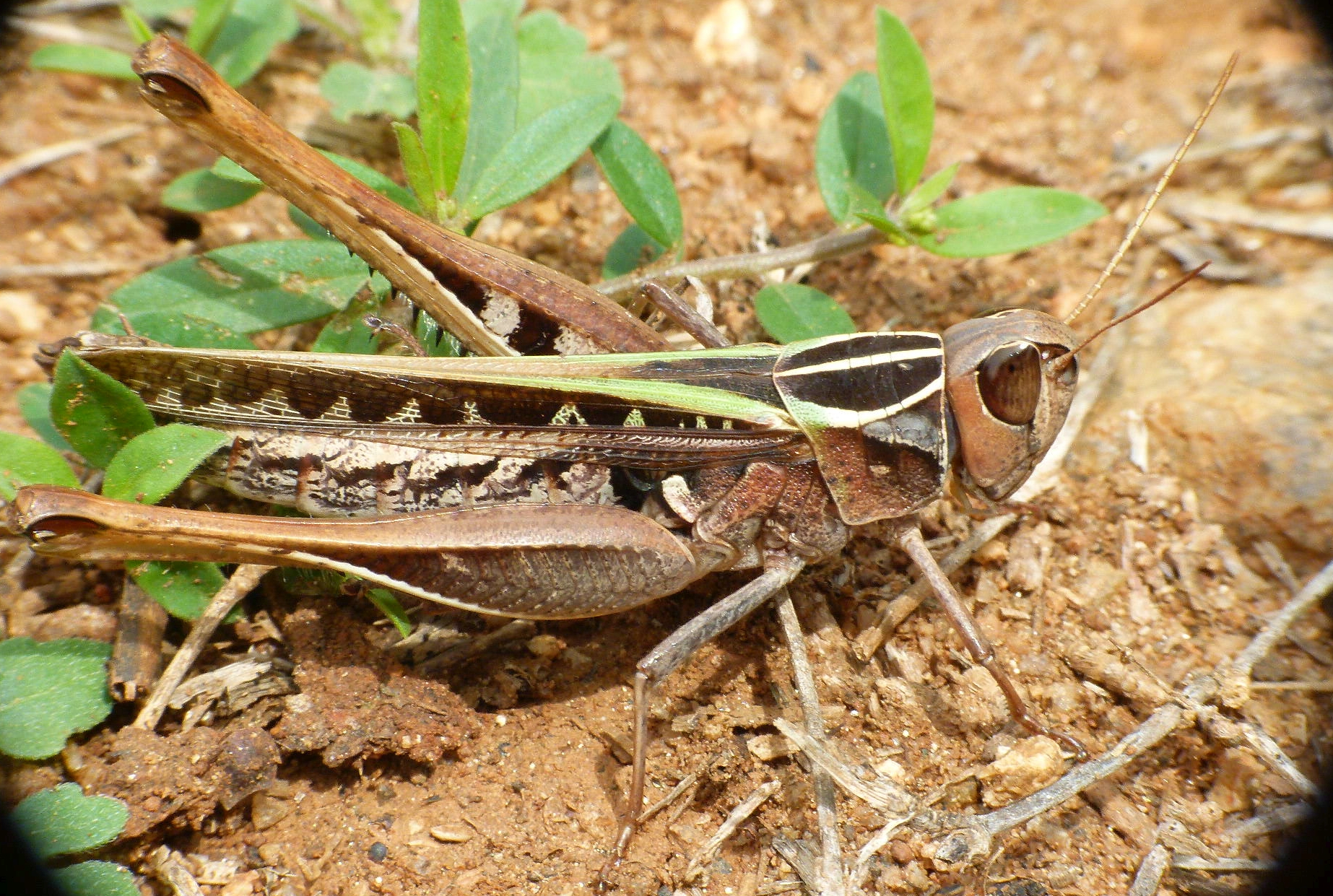
- Tylotropidius varicornis

Scientific classification
- Kingdom: Animalia
- Phylum: Arthropoda
- Clade: Pancrustacea
- Class: Insecta
- Order: Orthoptera
- Suborder: Caelifera
- Family: Acrididae
- Subfamily: Eyprepocnemidinae
- Genus: Tylotropidius; Stål, 1873

Type species
- Gryllus didymus Thunberg, 1815

= Tylotropidius =

Genus of grasshoppers

Tylotropidius is a genus of grasshopper with about six species found in Africa and Asia.

Species included in the genus are:

- Tylotropidius brevicornis Balderson & Yin, 1987
- Tylotropidius didymus (Thunberg, 1815)
- Tylotropidius rufipennis Yin & You, 2006
- Tylotropidius trimaculatus Grunshaw, 1995
- Tylotropidius varicornis (Walker, 1870)
- Tylotropidius yunnanensis Zheng & Liang, 1990
