= Shirakiacris =

Scientific classification
- Kingdom: Animalia
- Phylum: Arthropoda
- Clade: Pancrustacea
- Class: Insecta
- Order: Orthoptera
- Suborder: Caelifera
- Family: Acrididae
- Subfamily: Eyprepocnemidinae
- Genus: Shirakiacris; Dirsh, 1958

Genus of grasshoppers

Shirakiacris is an Asian genus of grasshoppers in the subfamily Eyprepocnemidinae and the tribe Eyprepocnemidini. Its recorded distribution includes: southern and eastern China, Korea, Japan and Vietnam.

== Species ==
The Orthoptera Species File lists:

- Shirakiacris brachyptera Zheng, 1983
- Shirakiacris shirakii (Bolívar, 1914) - type species (as "Euprepocnemis shirakii")
- Shirakiacris tenuistris Huang, 1988
- Shirakiacris yukweiensis (Chang, 1937)
