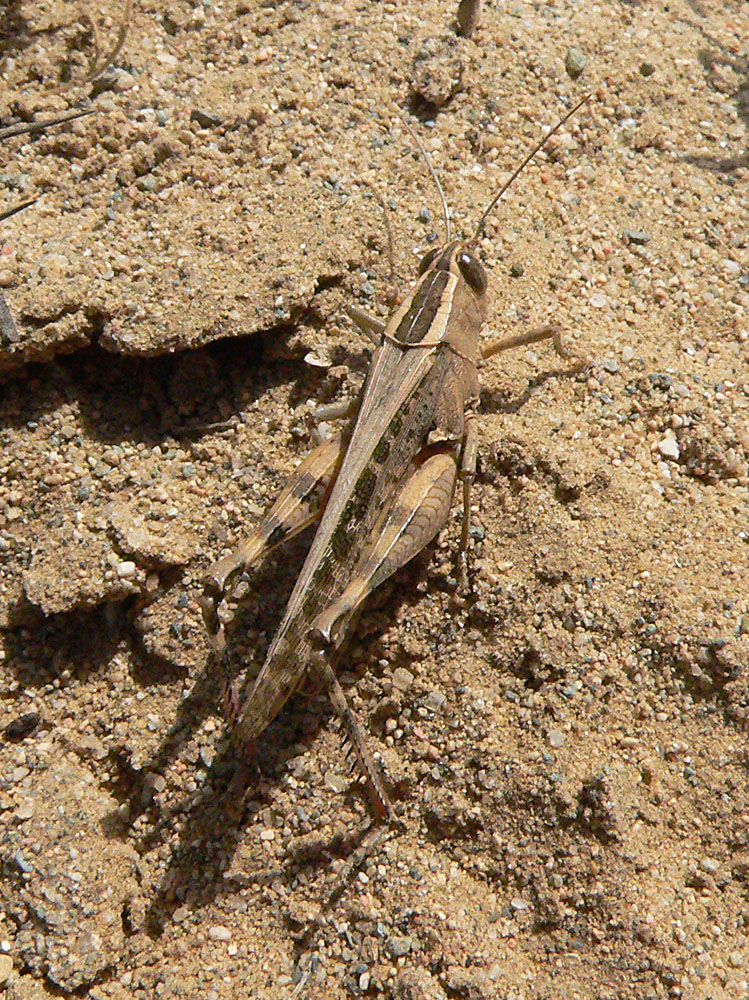
- Heteracris annulosa

Scientific classification
- Kingdom: Animalia
- Phylum: Arthropoda
- Clade: Pancrustacea
- Class: Insecta
- Order: Orthoptera
- Suborder: Caelifera
- Family: Acrididae
- Subfamily: Eyprepocnemidinae
- Tribe: Eyprepocnemidini
- Genus: Heteracris; Walker, 1870

= Heteracris =

Genus of grasshoppers

Heteracris is a genus of short-horned grasshoppers in the family Acrididae that are commonly called splendid grasshoppers. There are more than 60 described species in Heteracris, found in Africa, southern Europe, and mainland Asia through to India.

== Species ==
These species belong to the genus Heteracris:

- Heteracris acuticercus Grunshaw, 1991
- Heteracris adspersa (Redtenbacher, 1889)
- Heteracris aethiopica (Ramme, 1929)
- Heteracris annulosa Walker, 1870
- Heteracris antennata (Bolívar, 1914)
- Heteracris attenuata (Uvarov, 1921)
- Heteracris brevipennis (Bolívar, 1914)
- Heteracris buxtoni (Uvarov, 1921)
- Heteracris calliptamoides Uvarov, 1921
- Heteracris caloptenoides (Bolívar, 1914)
- Heteracris coeruleipennis (Uvarov, 1921)
- Heteracris coerulescens (Stål, 1876)
- Heteracris coerulipes (Sjöstedt, 1910) (eastern arc forest grasshopper)
- Heteracris concinnicrus Descamps & Wintrebert, 1966
- Heteracris coniceps Walker, 1870
- Heteracris cyanescens (Uvarov, 1939)
- Heteracris drakensbergensis Grunshaw, 1991
- Heteracris etbaica Ramme, 1928
- Heteracris festae (Giglio-Tos, 1893)
- Heteracris finoti (Bolívar, 1914)
- Heteracris glabra (Uvarov, 1938)
- Heteracris guineensis (Krauss, 1890)
- Heteracris harterti (Bolívar, 1913)
- Heteracris hemiptera (Uvarov, 1935)
- Heteracris herbacea (Serville, 1838)
- Heteracris hoggarensis (Chopard, 1929)
- Heteracris iranica (Bey-Bienko, 1960)
- Heteracris jeanneli (Bolívar, 1914)
- Heteracris jucundus (Carl, 1916)
- Heteracris juliea Grunshaw, 1991
- Heteracris leani (Uvarov, 1941)
- Heteracris lieutaghii Defaut, 1986
- Heteracris littoralis (Rambur, 1838)
- Heteracris minuta (Uvarov, 1921)
- Heteracris morbosa (Serville, 1838)
- Heteracris muscatensis Popov, 1981
- Heteracris nefasitensis Grunshaw, 1991
- Heteracris nigricornis (Saussure, 1899)
- Heteracris nobilis (Brancsik, 1892)
- Heteracris notabilis (Uvarov, 1942)
- Heteracris persa (Uvarov, 1933)
- Heteracris pictipes (Bolívar, 1902)
- Heteracris popovi (Uvarov, 1952)
- Heteracris prasinata (Stål, 1876)
- Heteracris pterosticha (Fischer von Waldheim, 1833)
- Heteracris pulchra (Bolívar, 1902)
- Heteracris pulchripes (Schaum, 1853)
- Heteracris punctata (Uvarov, 1936)
- Heteracris puntica (Popov, 1981)
- Heteracris rantae (Uvarov, 1936)
- Heteracris reducta Dirsh, 1962
- Heteracris rufitibia Walker, 1871
- Heteracris sabaea Popov, 1981
- Heteracris sikorai (Bolívar, 1914)
- Heteracris somalica (Popov, 1981)
- Heteracris speciosa (Sjöstedt, 1913)
- Heteracris syriaca (Brunner von Wattenwyl, 1861)
- Heteracris theodori (Uvarov, 1929)
- Heteracris trimaculata Grunshaw, 1991 (three-spotted forest grasshopper)
- Heteracris vinacea (Sjöstedt, 1923)
- Heteracris zolotarevskyi Dirsh, 1962
- Heteracris zulu Grunshaw, 1991
