= Heteracris trimaculata =

Conservation status
- Vulnerable (IUCN 3.1)

Scientific classification
- Kingdom: Animalia
- Phylum: Arthropoda
- Clade: Pancrustacea
- Class: Insecta
- Order: Orthoptera
- Suborder: Caelifera
- Family: Acrididae
- Genus: Heteracris
- Species: H. trimaculata

Binomial name
- Heteracris trimaculata (Grunshaw, 1991)

Species of grasshopper

Heteracris trimaculata, also known as the three-spotted forest grasshopper, is a species of grasshopper in the family Acrididae. The species is endemic to the Usambara Mountains in Tanzania.
