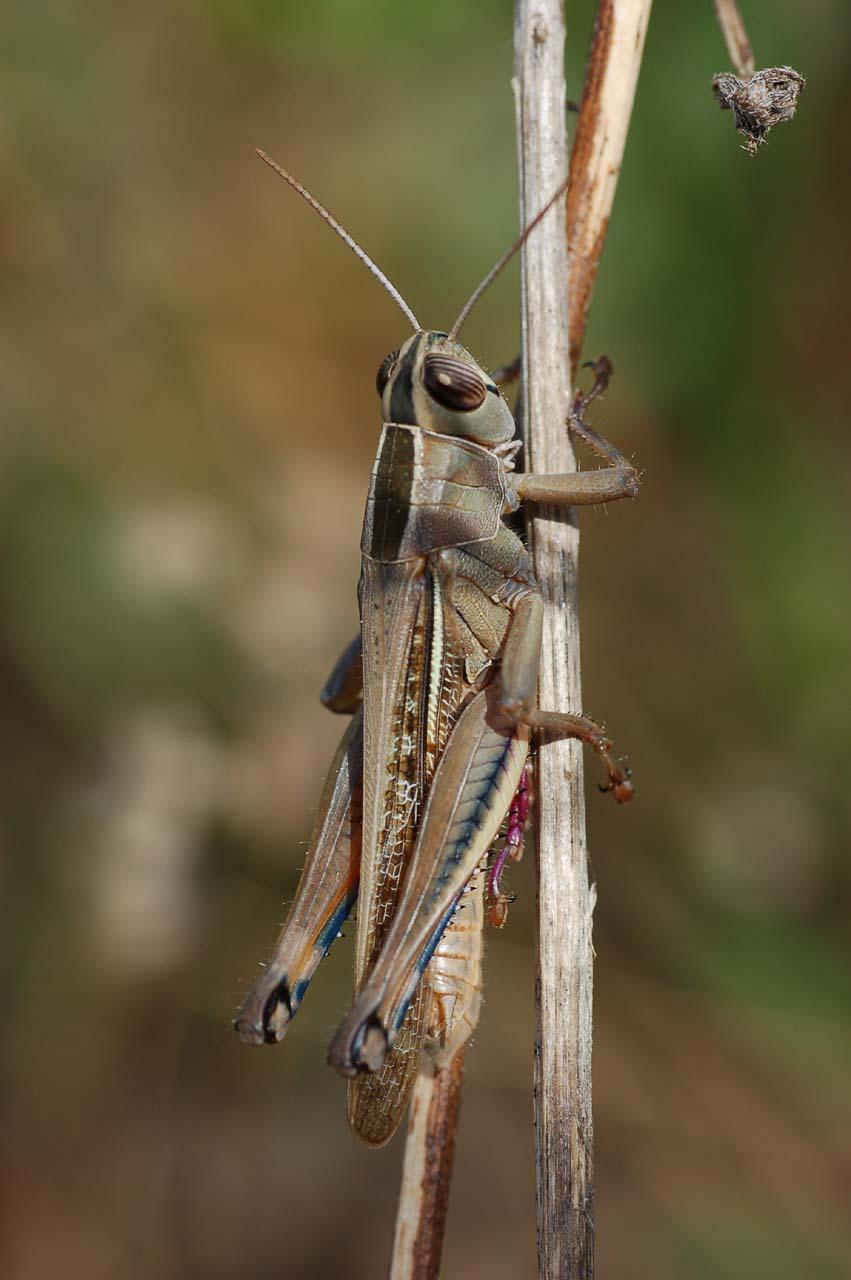

Conservation status
- Least Concern (IUCN 3.1)

Scientific classification
- Kingdom: Animalia
- Phylum: Arthropoda
- Clade: Pancrustacea
- Class: Insecta
- Order: Orthoptera
- Suborder: Caelifera
- Family: Acrididae
- Subfamily: Eyprepocnemidinae
- Tribe: Eyprepocnemidini
- Genus: Eyprepocnemis
- Species: E. plorans

Binomial name
- Eyprepocnemis plorans (Charpentier, 1825)

= Eyprepocnemis plorans =

Species of grasshopper

Eyprepocnemis plorans, the lamenting grasshopper, is a species of insect in the family Acrididae. It is the type species of the genus Eyprepocnemis, and is found in Africa, parts of the Middle East, and southern Europe. It typically inhabits wetlands and other moist habitats.

== Description ==
This is a medium-sized grasshopper, with females growing to a length of about 4.5 cm (1.8 in), while males are slightly smaller. The general colour is greyish-brown. The head and prothorax have a central dark band edged with paler stripes. The eye has a longitudinal dark streak, a characteristic shared by Anacridium aegyptium, Heteracris annulosa and Heteracris adspersa. The femurs of the hind legs have greenish, blue and yellow striations, and the hind tibia have reddish or bluish iridescence, and black and white spines.

== Distribution and habitat ==
Eyprepocnemis plorans is native to much of Africa, parts of the Middle East such as Iran, and southern Europe, where it is present in southern Greece, southern Italy, Sicily, Sardinia and southern Spain. It seems to be expanding its range northwards in Italy, possibly as a result of putative climate change. It usually occurs in wetlands, reed beds, freshwater and salt marshes, riverside vegetation, coastal vegetation and man-made habitats. It appreciates vertical-growing stems such as reeds, and habitats with tall forbs mixed with lower-growing plants.

== Ecology ==
Grasshoppers are in general polyphagous, eating vegetation from many different plant sources. Eyprepocnemis plorans feeds mainly on grasses and sedges. The female deposits an egg pod in the ground and the eggs hatch in the spring. The nymphs undergo five moults, becoming more similar to the adult insect at each developmental stage; they do not undergo metamorphosis and mature in the summer. In parts of the range many adults survive the winter. This species is rather wary and is a good flier.

== Research ==
The karyotype of this grasshopper includes a number of B chromosomes (extra chromosomes) and exhibits a very widespread polymorphism; populations in Spain show about 40 different variations in B chromosomes, resulting in an increase in the frequency of chiasmas.

During spermatogenesis in E. plorans, the autosomal chromosomes achieve complete synapsis, but the single X sex chromosome always remains unsynapsed. The autosomal chromosomes are transcriptionally active during the leptotene to zygotene stages of meiosis, whereas the X chromosome is inactive throughout meiosis likely because of specific epigenetic modifications.

== Status ==
This is a common species of grasshopper in suitable habitats. The population fluctuates seasonally, and the main threats are from urbanisation and developments associated with tourism. It has a wide range and the International Union for Conservation of Nature has rated it as being of least concern.
