= Cataloipus cognatus =

Scientific classification
- Kingdom: Animalia
- Phylum: Arthropoda
- Clade: Pancrustacea
- Class: Insecta
- Order: Orthoptera
- Suborder: Caelifera
- Family: Acrididae
- Genus: Cataloipus
- Species: C. cognatus

Binomial name
- Cataloipus cognatus (Walker, 1870)

Synonyms
- Cataloipus elegans (Walker, 1870); Heteracris elegans Walker, 1870; Heteracris cognata Walker, 1870

Species of grasshopper

Cataloipus cognatus is a species of grasshopper in the family Acrididae. It is found in Asia (India, Pakistan) and Africa (Mozambique, Zimbabwe, South Africa).
