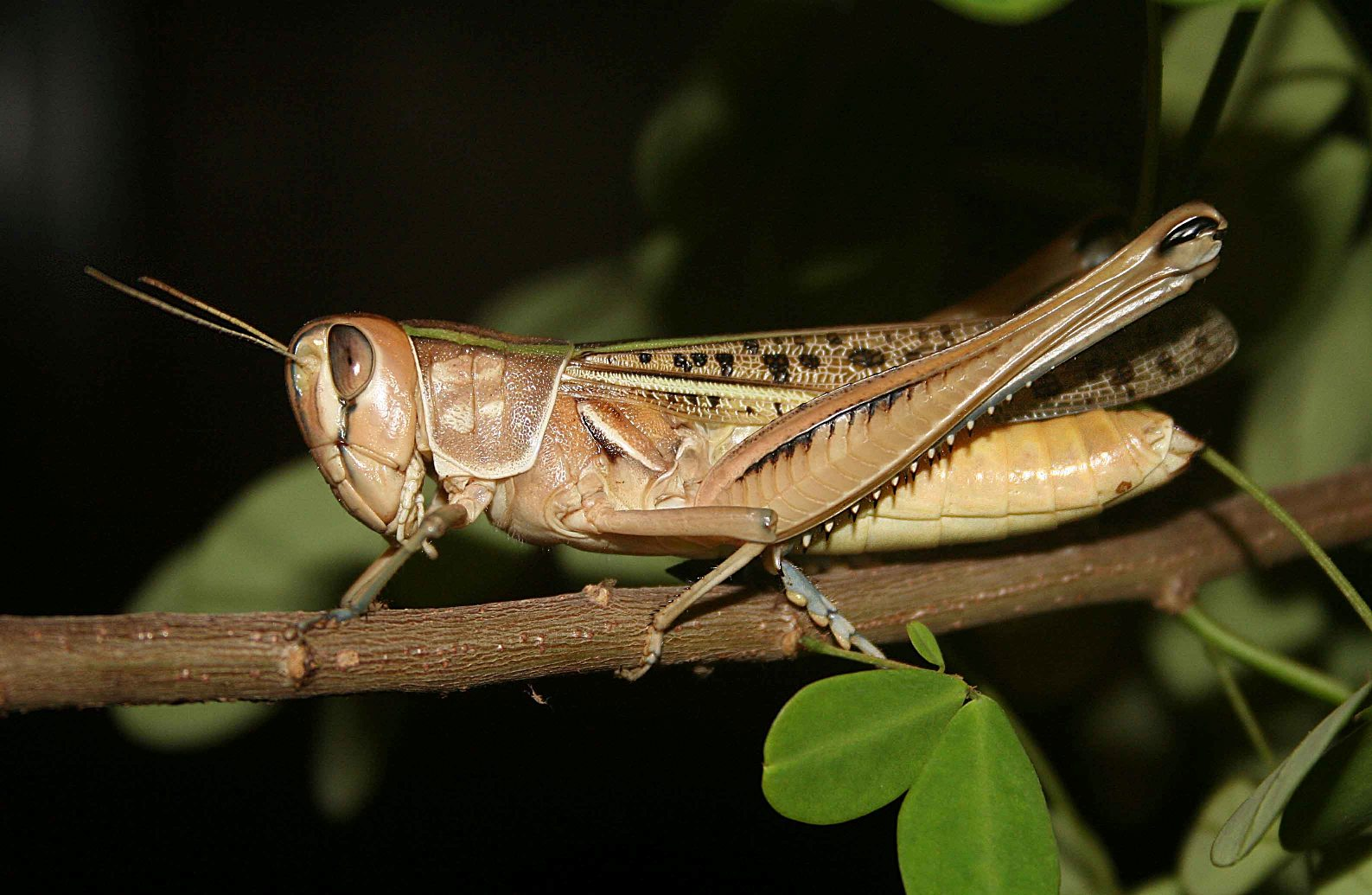
- Cataloipus cymbiferus, female

Scientific classification
- Kingdom: Animalia
- Phylum: Arthropoda
- Clade: Pancrustacea
- Class: Insecta
- Order: Orthoptera
- Suborder: Caelifera
- Family: Acrididae
- Subfamily: Eyprepocnemidinae
- Genus: Cataloipus; Bolívar, I., 1890

Type species
- Cataloipus oberthuri (Bolívar, I., 1890)

= Cataloipus =

Genus of grasshoppers

Cataloipus is a genus of grasshopper in the family Acrididae.

== Species ==
- Cataloipus abyssinicus Uvarov 1921
- Cataloipus ambiguus (Stål, 1876)
- Cataloipus brunneri (Kirby, W.F. 1910)
- Cataloipus cognatus (Walker, F., 1870)
- Cataloipus cymbiferus (Krauss 1877)
- Cataloipus fuscocoeruleipes Sjöstedt, 1923
- Cataloipus gigas Ramme, 1929
- Cataloipus himalayensis Singh, A.K. & Tandon 1978
- Cataloipus indicus Uvarov 1942
- Cataloipus klaptoczi Karny, 1917
- Cataloipus oberthuri (Bolívar, I., 1890)
- Cataloipus pulcher Sjöstedt, 1929
- Cataloipus roseipennis Uvarov 1921
- Cataloipus thomasi Uvarov 1933
- Cataloipus zuluensis Sjöstedt, 1929
