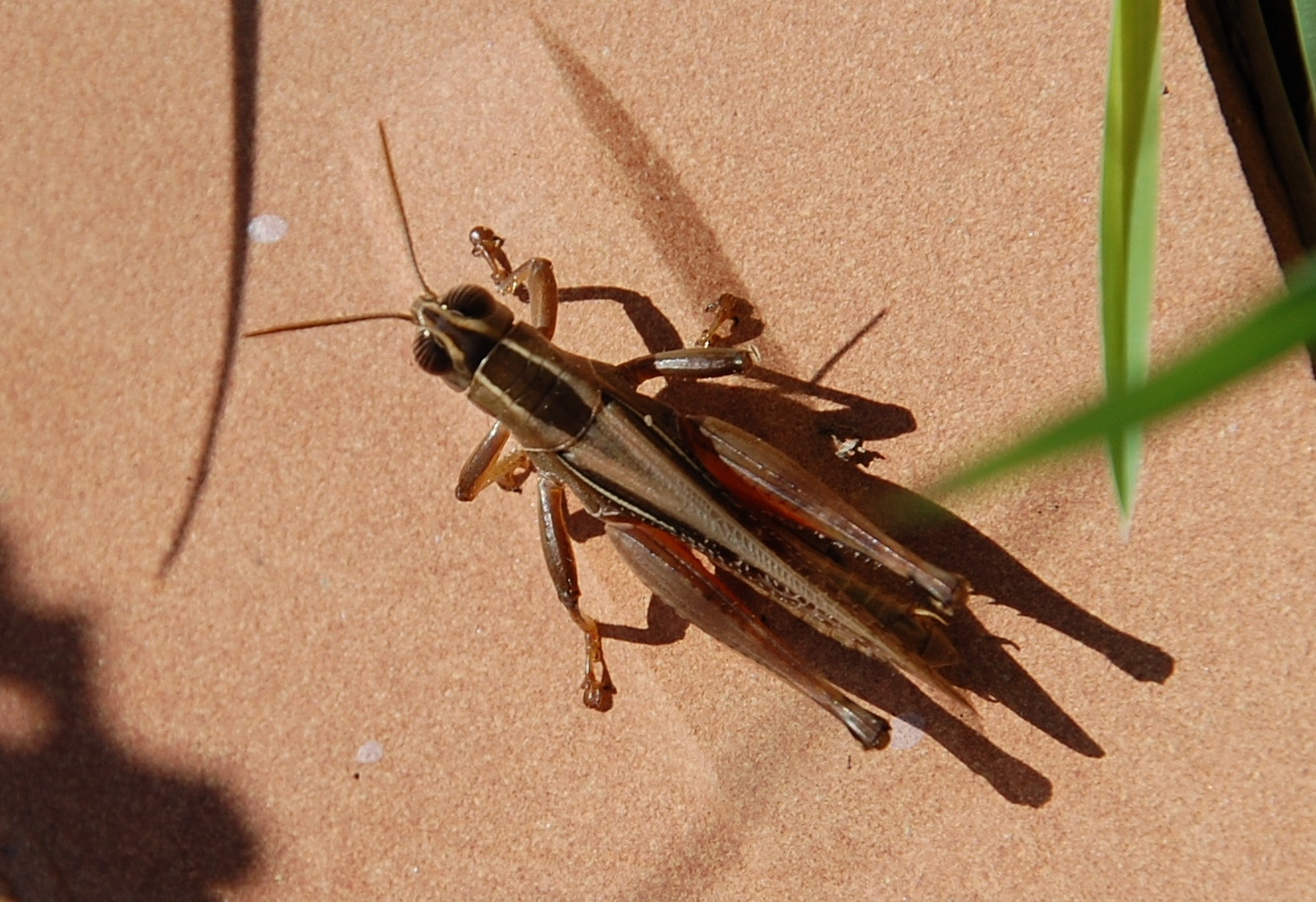
- Eyprepocnemis plorans

Scientific classification
- Kingdom: Animalia
- Phylum: Arthropoda
- Clade: Pancrustacea
- Class: Insecta
- Order: Orthoptera
- Suborder: Caelifera
- Infraorder: Acrididea
- Nanorder: Acridomorpha
- Superfamily: Acridoidea
- Family: Acrididae
- Subfamily: Eyprepocnemidinae; Brunner von Wattenwyl, 1893

Synonyms
- Euprepocnemes Brunner von Wattenwyl, 1893; Eyprepocnemes Brunner von Wattenwyl, 1893

= Eyprepocnemidinae =

Subfamily of grasshoppers

The Eyprepocnemidinae are a subfamily of Acrididae (originally described by Brunner von Wattenwyl under the synonym: Euprepocnemes) in the Orthoptera: Caelifera. Species can be found in Africa, mainland Europe and Asia.

== Genera ==
The Orthoptera Species File lists the following:

=== Tribe Eyprepocnemidini ===
Auth. Brunner von Wattenwyl, 1893

- Euprepocnemides Bolívar, 1914
- Eyprepocnemis Fieber, 1853
- Eyprepocprifas - monotypic E. insularis Donskoff, 1982 - Cape Verde
- Heteracris Walker, 1870
- Shirakiacris Dirsh, 1958

=== Tribe not determined ===
- Amphiprosopia Uvarov, 1921
- Belonocnemis Bolívar, 1914
- Cataloipus Bolívar, 1890
- Clomacris Popov, 1981
- Cyathosternum Bolívar, 1882
- Jagoa Popov, 1980 - monotypic Jagoa gwynni (Uvarov, 1941)
- Jucundacris Uvarov, 1921
- Malagacetrus Dirsh, 1962
- Malonjeacris Grunshaw, 1995
- Metaxymecus Karsch, 1893
- Neritius Bolívar, 1914
- Ogasawaracris Ito, 2003
- Oxyaeida Bolívar, 1914
- Paraneritius Jago, 1994
- Paraprocticus Grunshaw, 1995
- Phyllocercus Uvarov, 1941 - monotypic Phyllocercus bicoloripes Uvarov, 1941
- Squaroplatacris Liang & Zheng, 1987
- Taramassus Giglio-Tos, 1907
- Tenebracris Dirsh, 1962
- Tropidiopsis Bolívar, 1911
- Tylotropidius Stål, 1873
