= Figueiras, Cape Verde =

Figueiras
- Settlement
- Coordinates: 17.130°N 25.207°W
- Country: Cape Verde
- Island: Santo Antão
- Municipality: Ribeira Grande
- Civil parish: São Pedro Apóstolo

Population (2010)
  - Total: 401
- ID: 11402

Figueiras is a settlement in the northern part of the island of Santo Antão, Cape Verde. It is situated in a mountain valley, 20 km northwest of the island capital Porto Novo. The southernmost part lies in Moroços Natural Park.

== See also ==
- List of villages and settlements in Cape Verde
