= Garça de Cima =

- Settlement
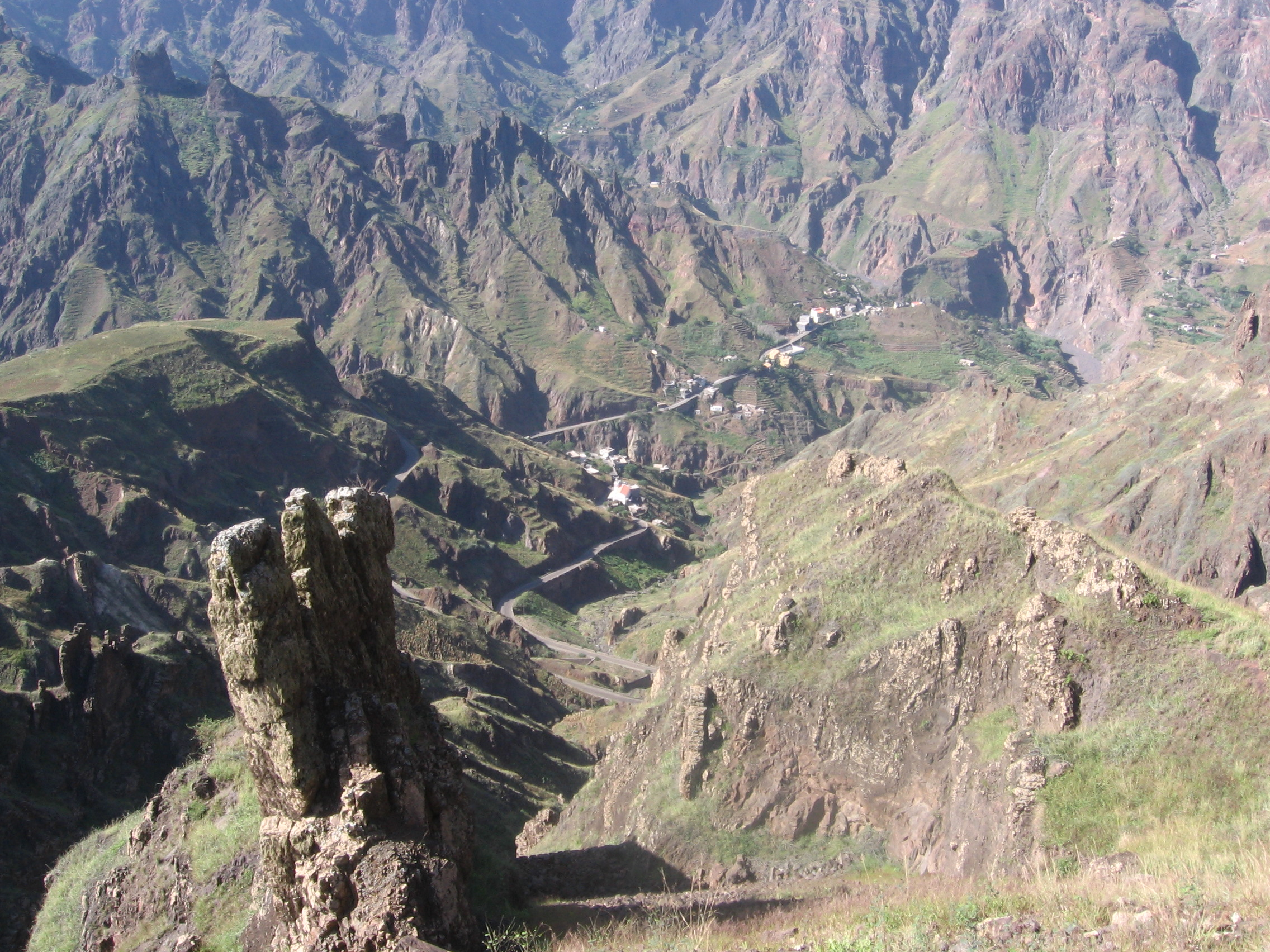
- The Garça Valley and the village

- Location within Cape Verde
- Coordinates: 17.114°N 25.165°W
- Country: Cape Verde
- Island: Santo Antão
- Municipality: Ribeira Grande
- Civil parish: São Pedro Apóstolo

Population (2010)
  - Total: 1,138
- ID: 11403

Garça de Cima is a settlement in the northern part of the island of Santo Antão, Cape Verde. It is situated in the upper valley of the river Ribeira da Garça, 15 km northwest of the island capital Porto Novo. The southernmost part lies in Moroços Natural Park.

== See also ==
- List of villages and settlements in Cape Verde
