= Fontainhas =

- Settlement
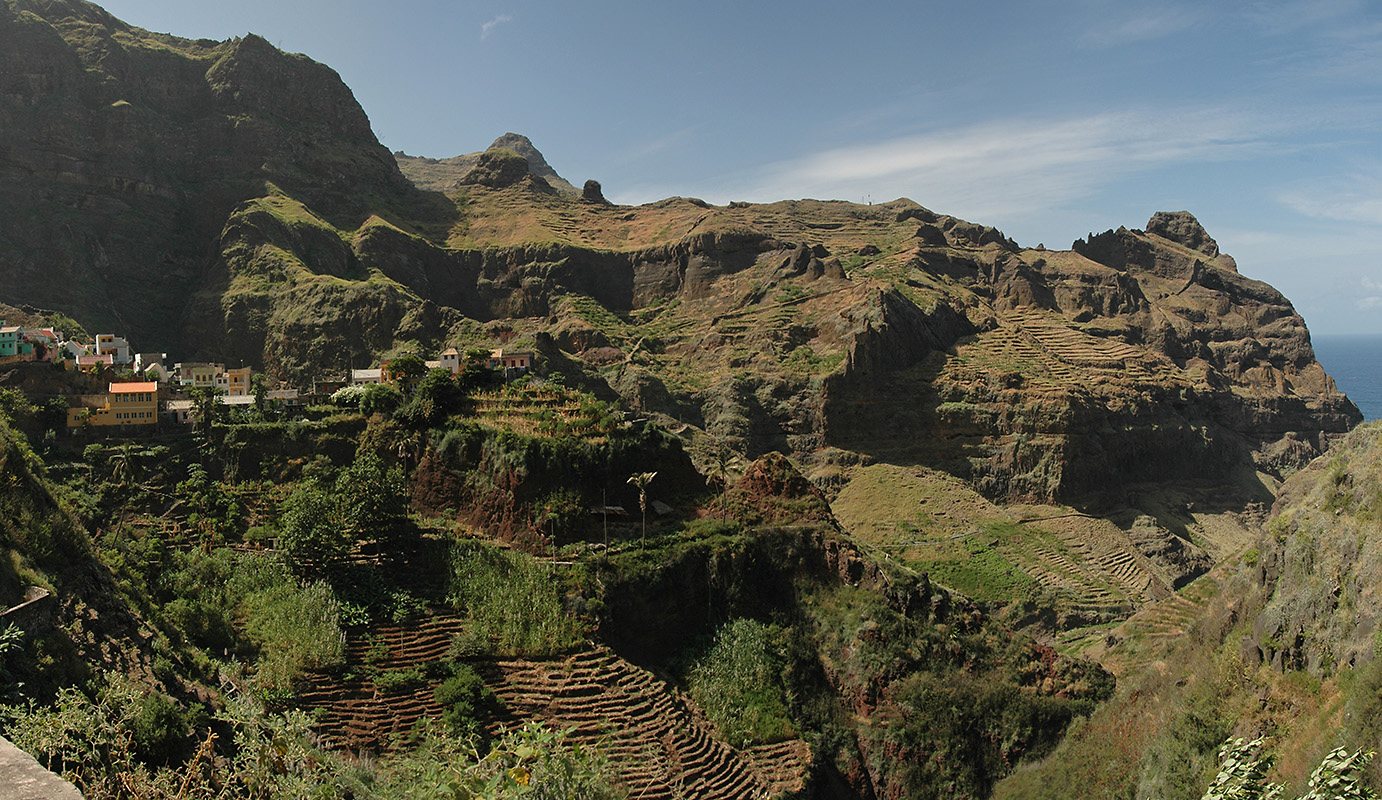
- Village of Fontainhas

- Location within Cape Verde
- Coordinates: 17.188°N 25.104°W
- Country: Cape Verde
- Island: Santo Antão
- Municipality: Ribeira Grande
- Civil parish: Nossa Senhora do Livramento
- Elevation: 158 m (518 ft)

Population (2010)
  - Total: 282
- ID: 11201

Fontainhas is a settlement in the northern part of the island of Santo Antão, Cape Verde. It is situated near the rocky north coast of the island, two km southwest of Ponta do Sol and 19 km north of the island capital Porto Novo. The settlement includes the smaller villages Corvo and Forminguinhas, about one km west of Fontainhas proper.

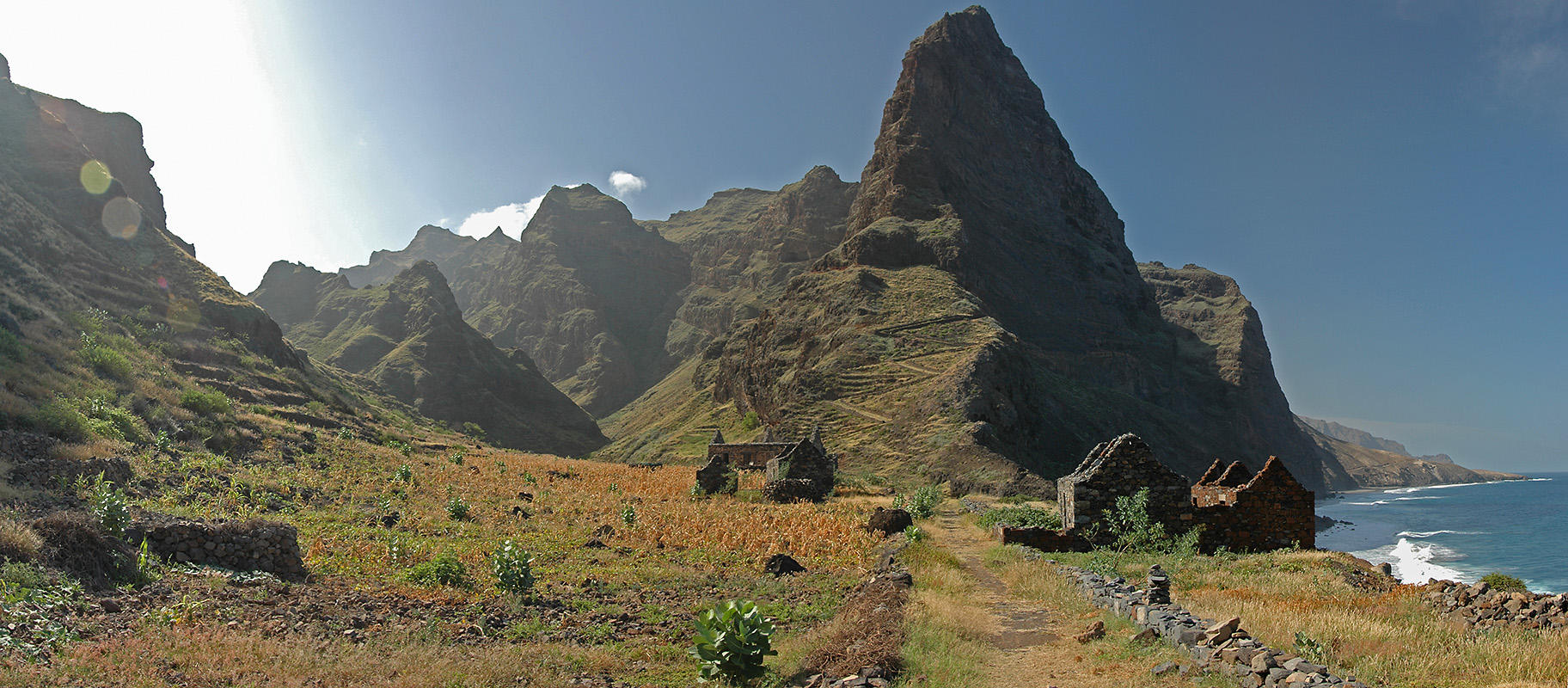
Forminguinhas

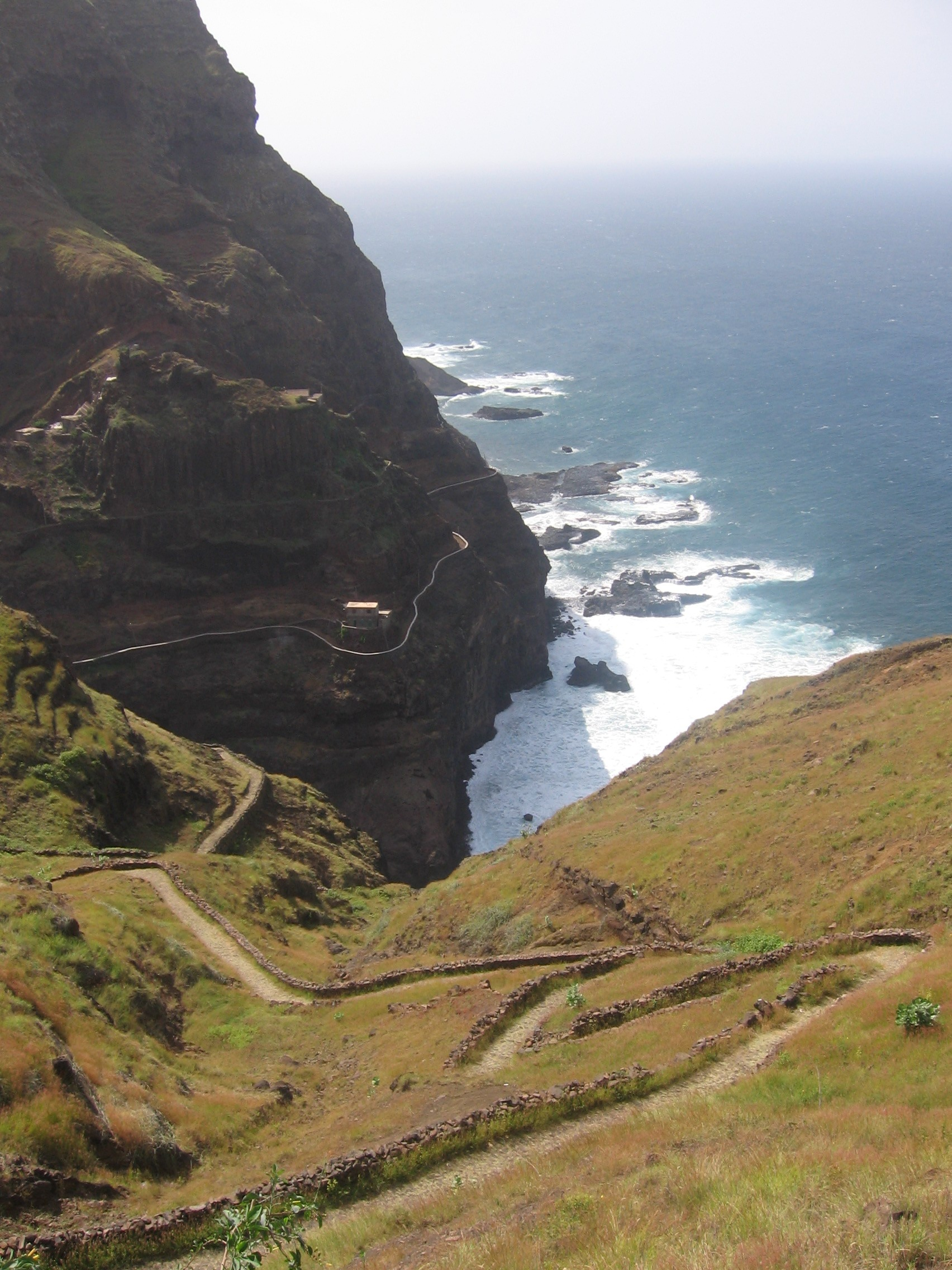
Corvo

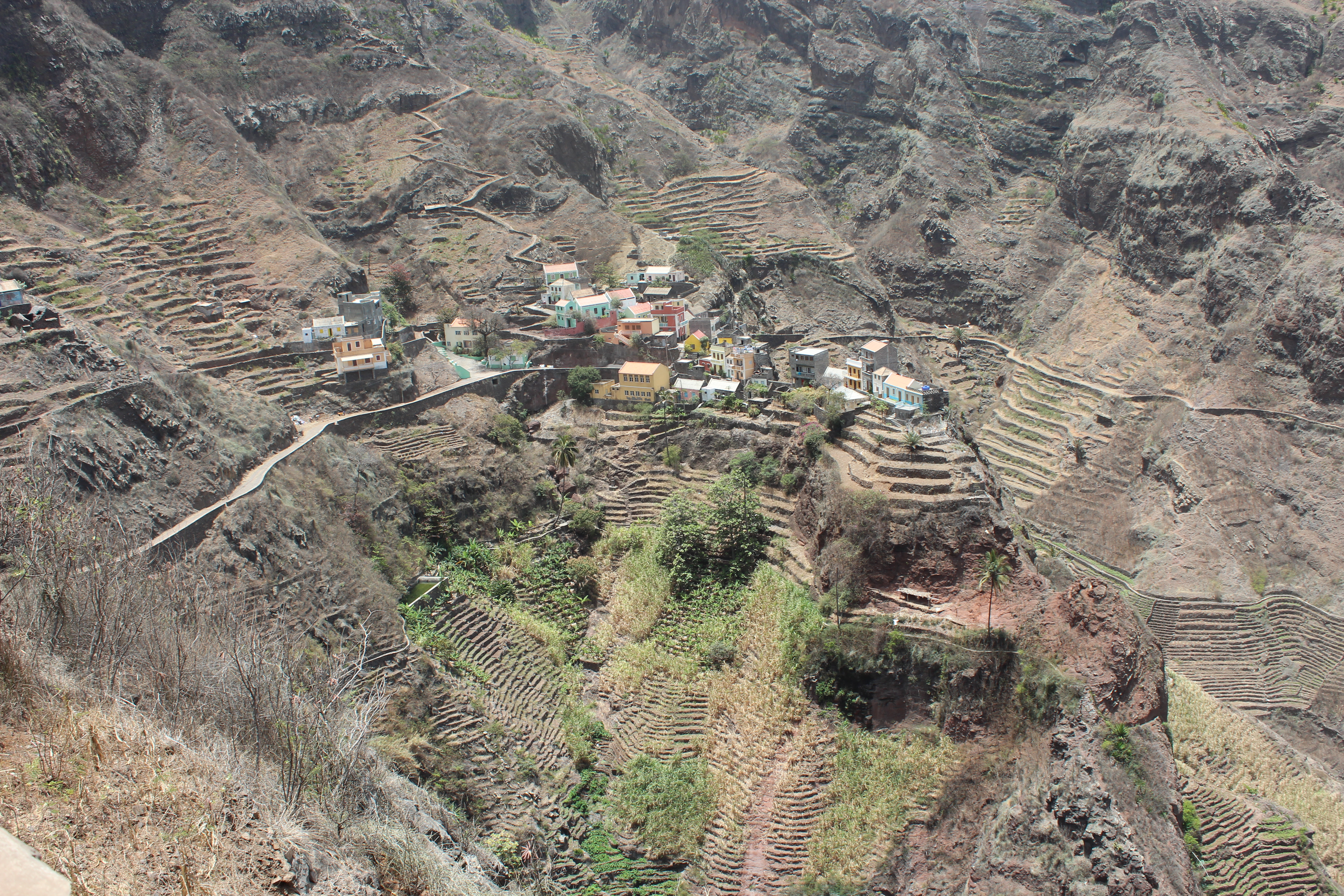
The centre of Fontainhas located on steep slope area of a mountain

== See also ==
- List of villages and settlements in Cape Verde
