= Nossa Senhora do Livramento =

Nossa Senhora do Livramento may refer to the following places:

- Nossa Senhora do Livramento, Mato Grosso, Brazil
- Nossa Senhora do Livramento, Cape Verde
