= Chã de Igreja =

- Settlement
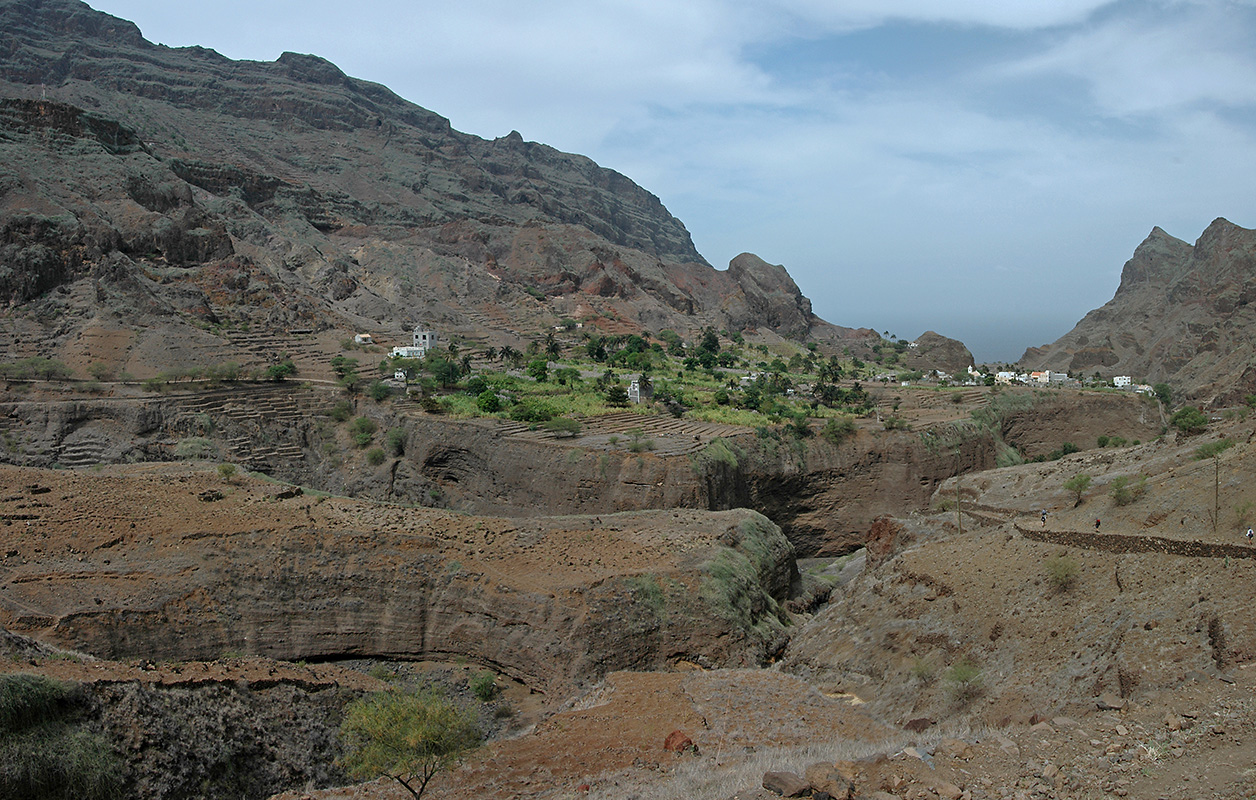
- Chã de Igreja

- Location within Cape Verde
- Coordinates: 17.157084°N 25.163512°W
- Country: Cape Verde
- Island: Santo Antão
- Municipality: Ribeira Grande
- Civil parish: São Pedro Apóstolo

Population (2010)
  - Total: 672
- ID: 11401

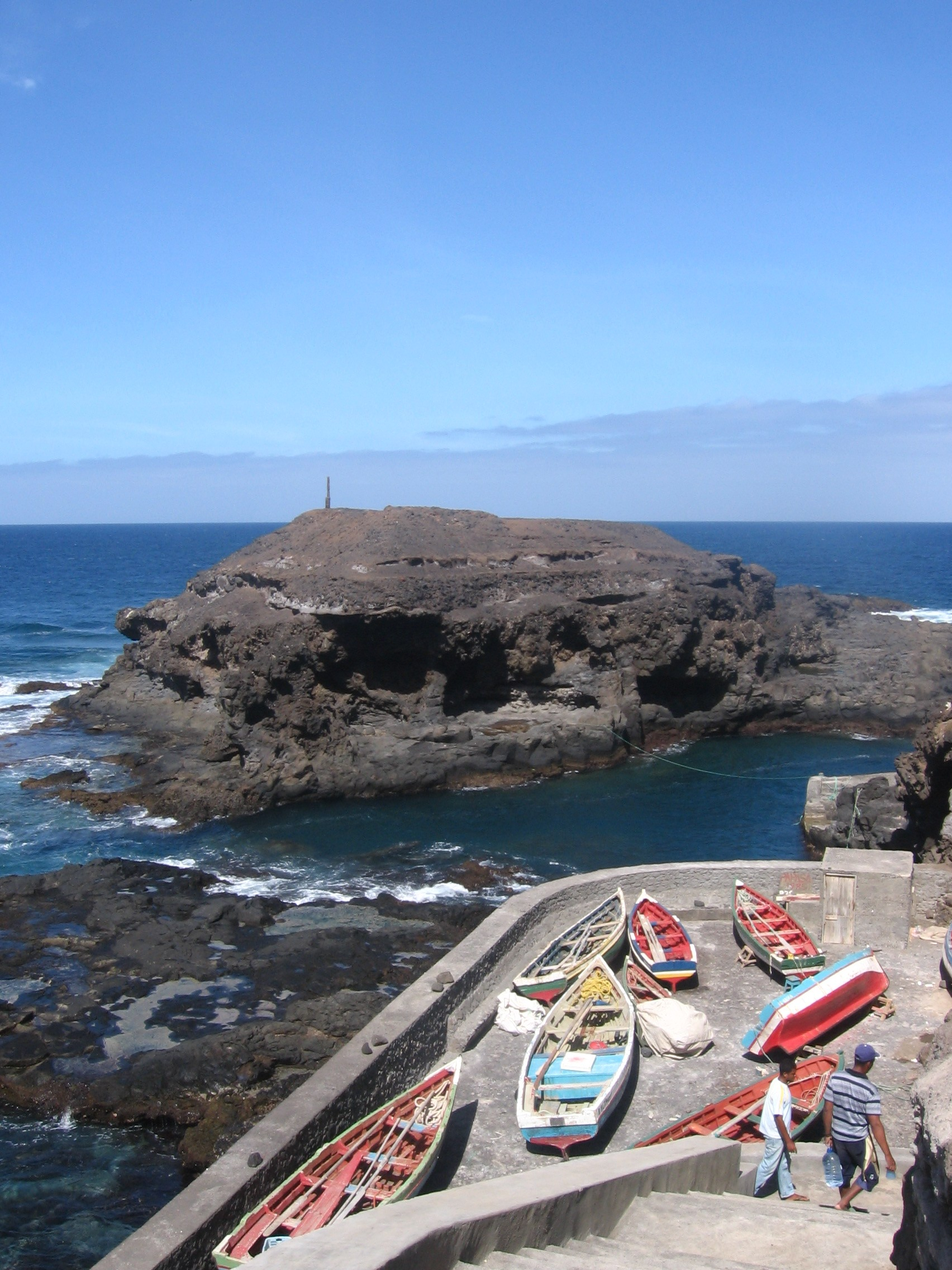
Cruzinha da Garça

Chã de Igreja is a town in the northern part of the island of Santo Antão, Cape Verde. It is situated near the north coast of the island, in the valley of the river Ribeira da Garça, 19 km northwest of the island capital Porto Novo. In 2010 its population was 672. The nature reserve Cruzinha, which includes the small seaside village Cruzinha da Garça (part of Chã de Igreja), stretches northeast of Chã de Igreja along the coast.

== See also ==
- List of cities and towns in Cape Verde
