= Ribeira Alta =

- Settlement
- Coordinates: 17.143°N 25.192°W
- Country: Cape Verde
- Island: Santo Antão
- Municipality: Ribeira Grande
- Civil parish: São Pedro Apóstolo

Population (2010)
  - Total: 170
- ID: 11405

Ribeira Alta is a settlement in the northern part of the island of Santo Antão, Cape Verde. It is situated in a mountain valley near the north coast, 19 km northwest of the island capital Porto Novo.

== See also ==
- List of villages and settlements in Cape Verde
