= São Pedro Apóstolo =

- Civil parish
- Coordinates: 17.13°N 25.18°W
- Country: Cape Verde
- Island: Santo Antão
- Municipality: Ribeira Grande

Population (2010)
  - Total: 2,381
- ID: 114

São Pedro Apóstolo is a freguesia (civil parish) of Cape Verde. It covers the western part of the municipality of Ribeira Grande, on the island of Santo Antão.

== Settlements ==
The freguesia consists of the following settlements (population at the 2010 census):

- Chã de Igreja (pop: 672, town)
- Figueiras (pop: 401)
- Garça de Cima (pop: 1,138)
- Ribeira Alta (pop: 170)
