= Cruzinha =

Protected area in Cape Verde

Cruzinha Nature Reserve
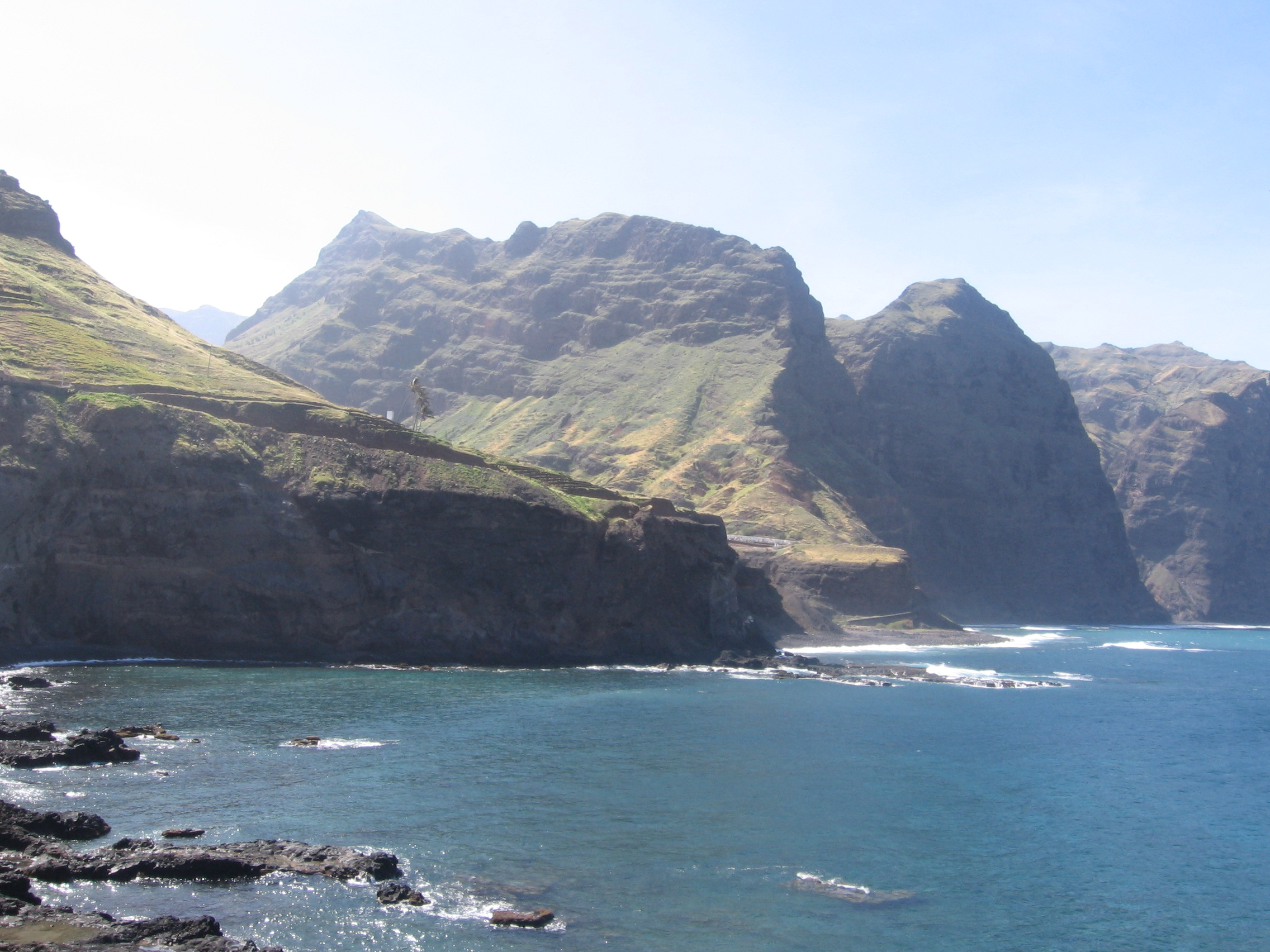
- Mouth of the Ribeira da Garça
- Interactive map of Cruzinha Nature Reserve
- Location: Santo Antão, Cape Verde
- Coordinates: 17.175°N 25.155°W
- Area: 11.18 km^{2} (4.32 sq mi)

The Cruzinha Nature Reserve is a protected area in the northern part of the island of Santo Antão in the Cape Verde archipelago. It covers part of the north coast of the island, between the rivers Ribeira da Garça and the Ribeira do Mocho. It contains the only coastal dunes of Santo Antão. It takes its name from the village Cruzinha da Garça, part of the town Chã de Igreja.
