= Ribeira da Garça =

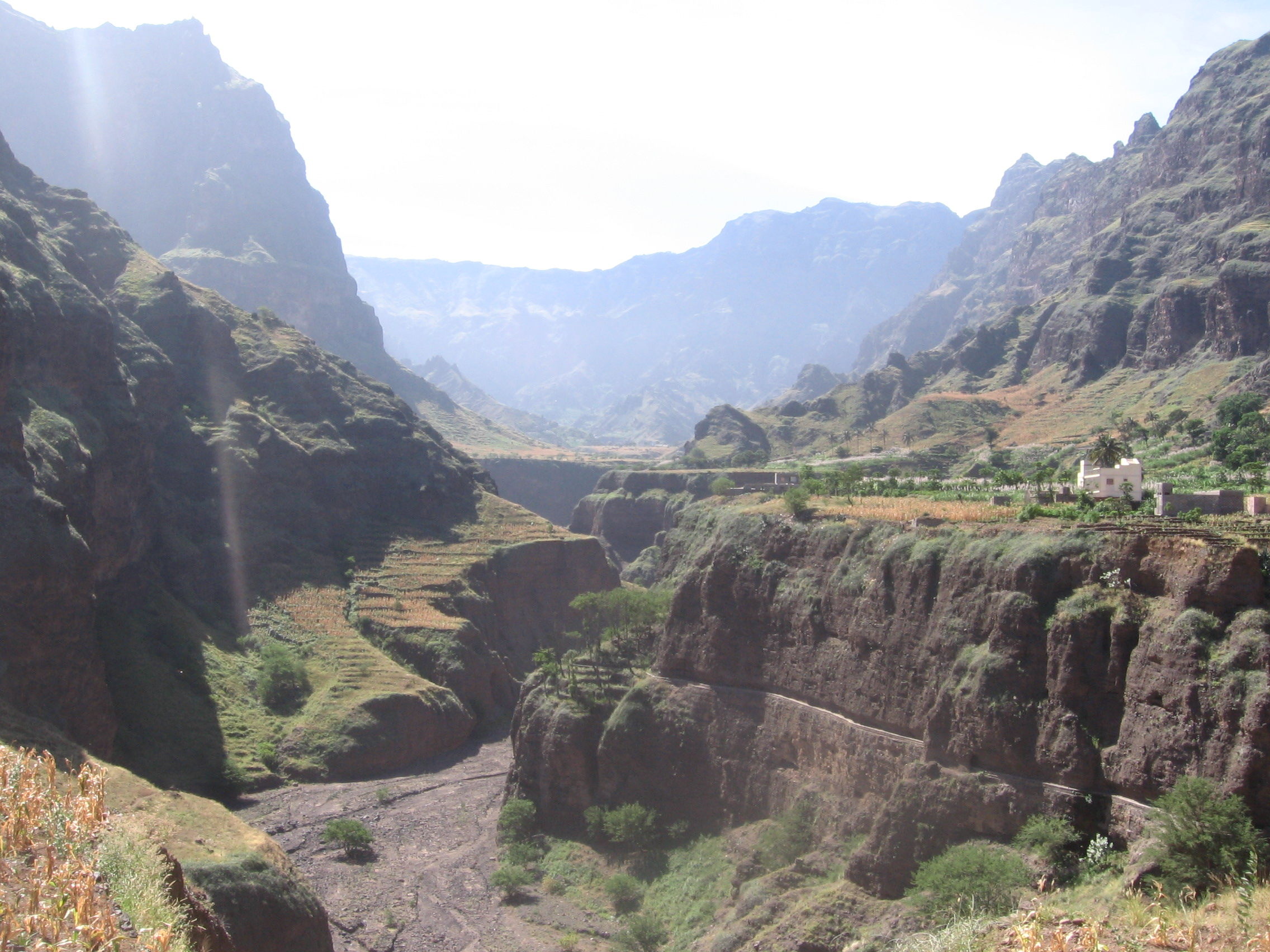
- The canyon of Ribeira da Garça

Location
- Country: Cape Verde

Physical characteristics
- Source
  - location: Moroços, Santo Antão
- Mouth
  - location: Atlantic Ocean
  - coordinates: 17.166°N 25.170°W

Ribeira da Garça is a river in the northern part of the island of Santo Antão in Cape Verde. Its source is on the north side of the eastern plateau of the island, northeast of Pico Moroços. It flows north through the settlements of Garça de Cima and Chã de Igreja, in the western part of the municipality of Ribeira Grande. It flows into the Atlantic Ocean near Chã de Igreja.

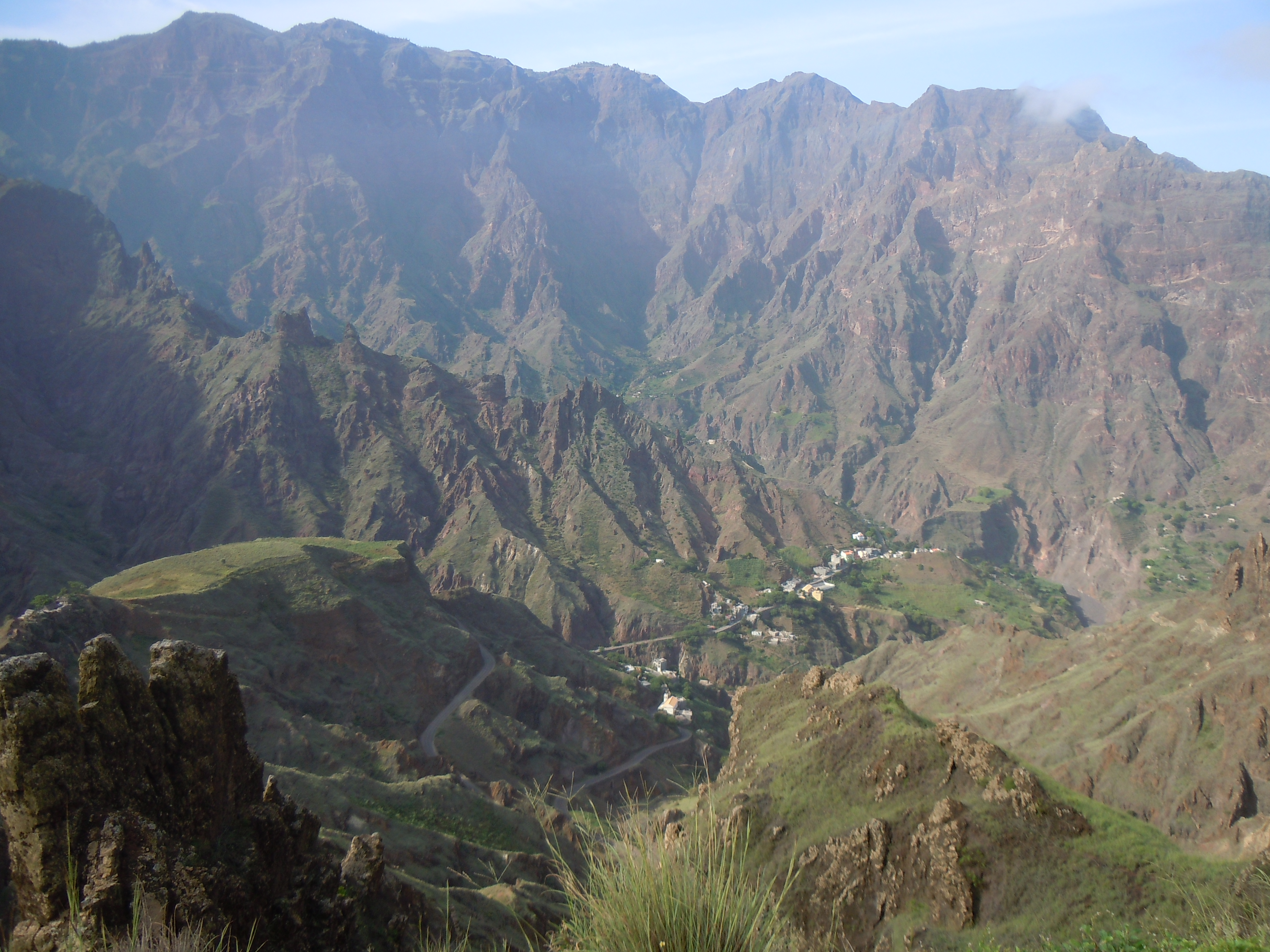
View of the head of the valley

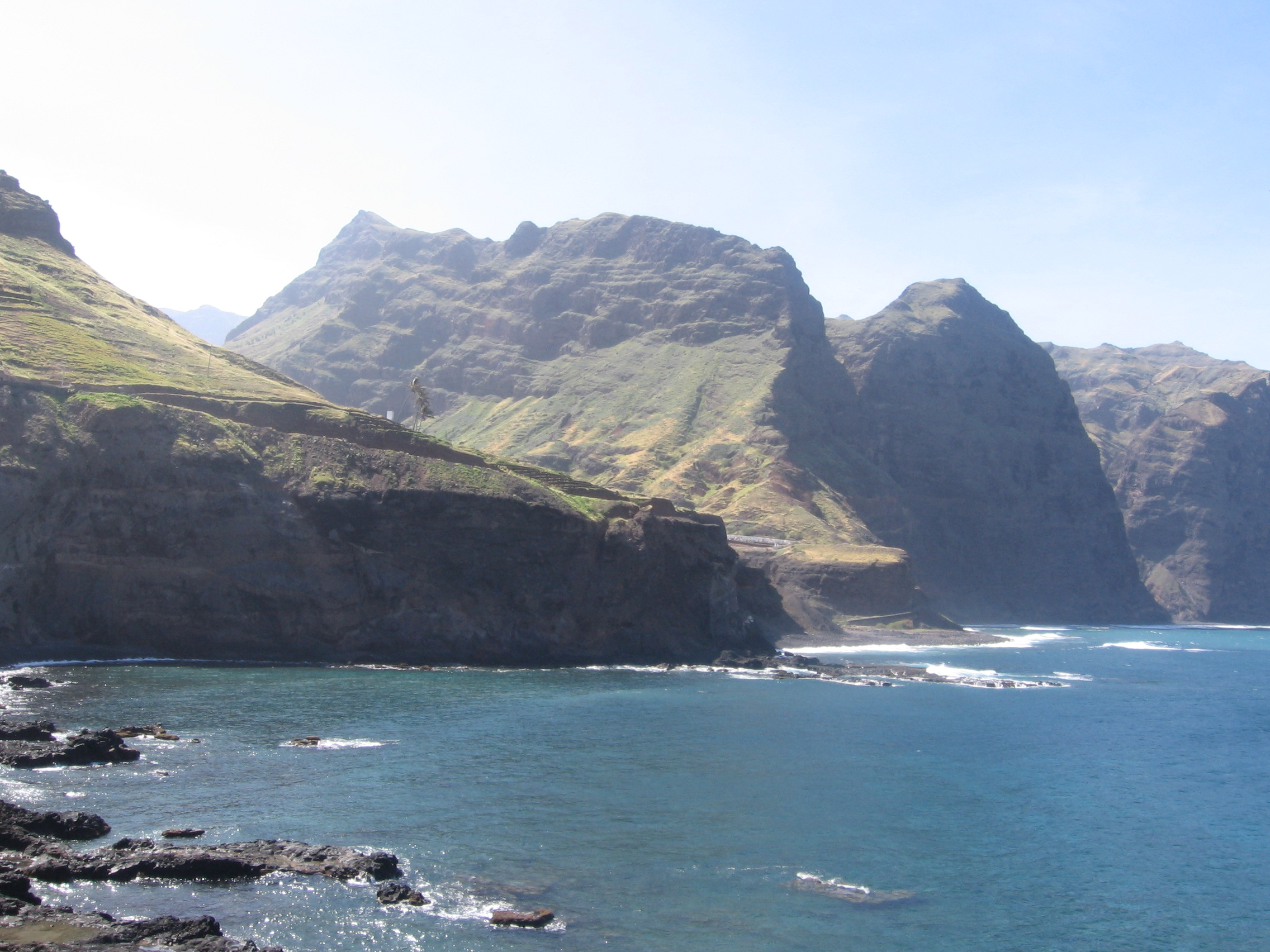
Mouth of the Ribeira da Garça. The alluvial terrace, 40 meters above sea level, is clearly visible

== Canto de Cagarra Dam ==
In 2014 the Canto de Cagarra Dam (Barragem de Canto de Cagarra) was constructed on the river, 2.3 km south of Chã de Igreja. Due to silting and problems in water supply, electricity and the absence of an irrigation network, aggravated by flood damage in 2016, the reservoir has not brought the expected benefits. Repairs have been announced in March 2018.

== See also ==
- List of streams in Cape Verde
