= Nossa Senhora do Livramento, Cape Verde =

Nossa Senhora do Livramento
- Civil parish
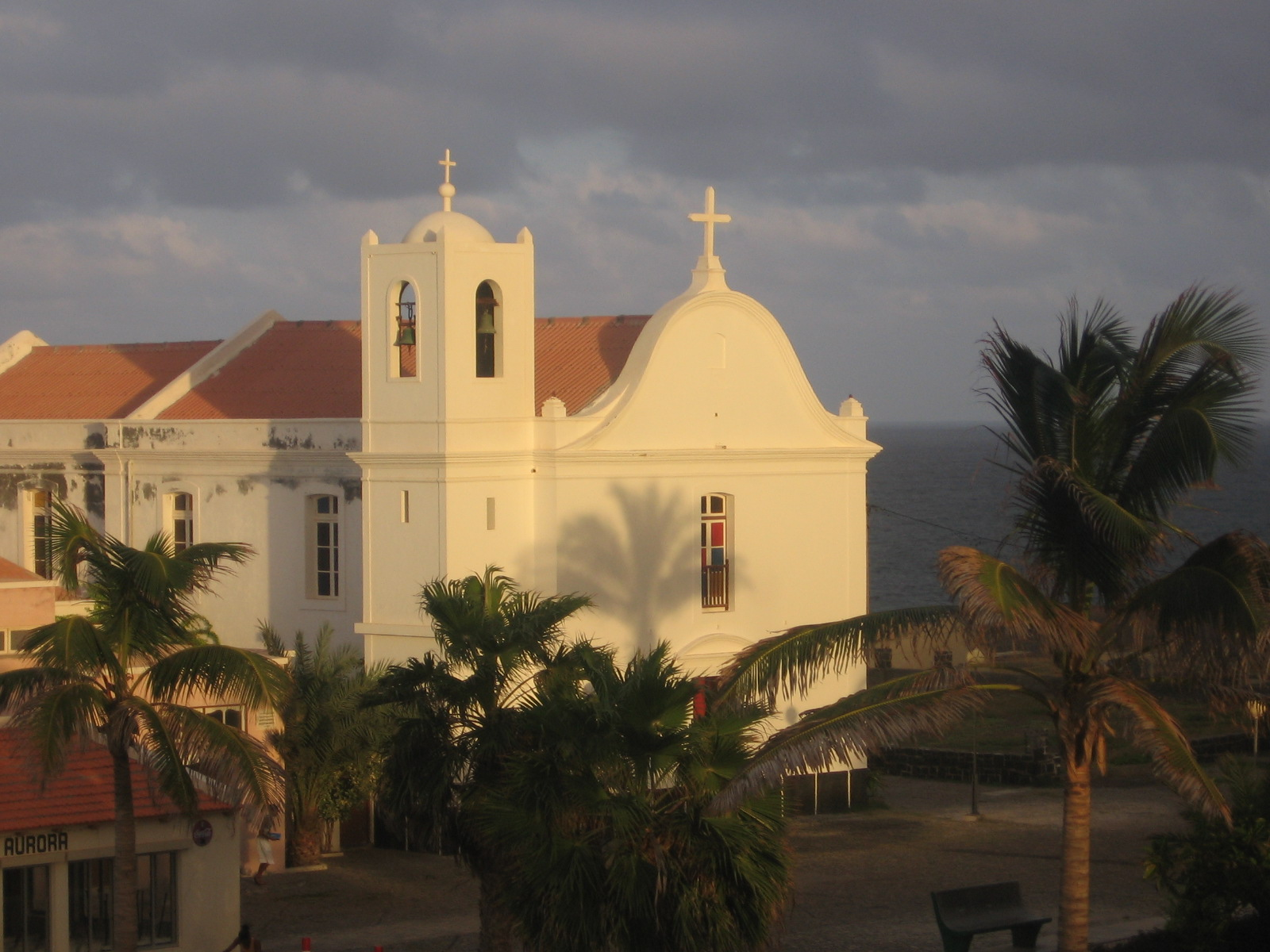
- The church of Nossa Senhora do Livramento, Ponta do Sol

- Location within Cape Verde
- Coordinates: 17.18°N 25.11°W
- Country: Cape Verde
- Island: Santo Antão
- Municipality: Ribeira Grande

Population (2010)
  - Total: 2,425
- ID: 112

Nossa Senhora do Livramento is a freguesia (civil parish) of Cape Verde. It covers the northern part of the municipality of Ribeira Grande, on the island of Santo Antão.

== Settlements ==
The freguesia consists of the following settlements (population at the 2010 census):

- Fontainhas (pop: 282)
- Ponta do Sol (pop: 2,143, city)
