= Moroços =

Natural park in Cape Verde

Moroços Natural Park
- Interactive map of Moroços Natural Park
- Coordinates: 17.090°N 25.176°W
- Area: 8.18 km^{2} (3.16 sq mi)

Moroços Natural Park (Parque Natural de Moroços), in the middle of the island of Santo Antão, is one of ten "natural parks" in Cape Verde. The protected area is 8.18 km^{2} (3.16 sq mi). It covers 7.46 km^{2} (2.88 sq mi) of the municipality of Ribeira Grande, and 0.71 km^{2} (0.27 sq mi) of Porto Novo.

== Geography ==
The Moroços Natural Park is situated at the western end of the eastern plateau of Santo Antão. It is characterised by steep cliffs towards the north, and pozzolana soils. Its highest point is Monte Moroços at 1,767 m elevation. The natural park also includes the summits Cruz de Moroços (1,646 m) and Monte Hortelão (1,631 m) and the areas of Gudo dos Moroços, Fonte Hortelão and Chã de Moroços.

== Flora ==
Its vegetation is diverse due to its location between the arid plateau and the more humid headwaters of Ribeira da Garça and Ribeira Manequim, and still close to the original natural vegetation. It has a large variety of endemic plants, many of which are endangered or vulnerable species, including Artemisia gorgonum, Conyza feae, Globularia amygdalifolia and Periploca laevigata.

== See also ==
- List of protected areas in Cape Verde
