= Ribeira Grande, Cape Verde (municipality) =

Municipality of Cape Verde

Ribeira Grande
- Municipality
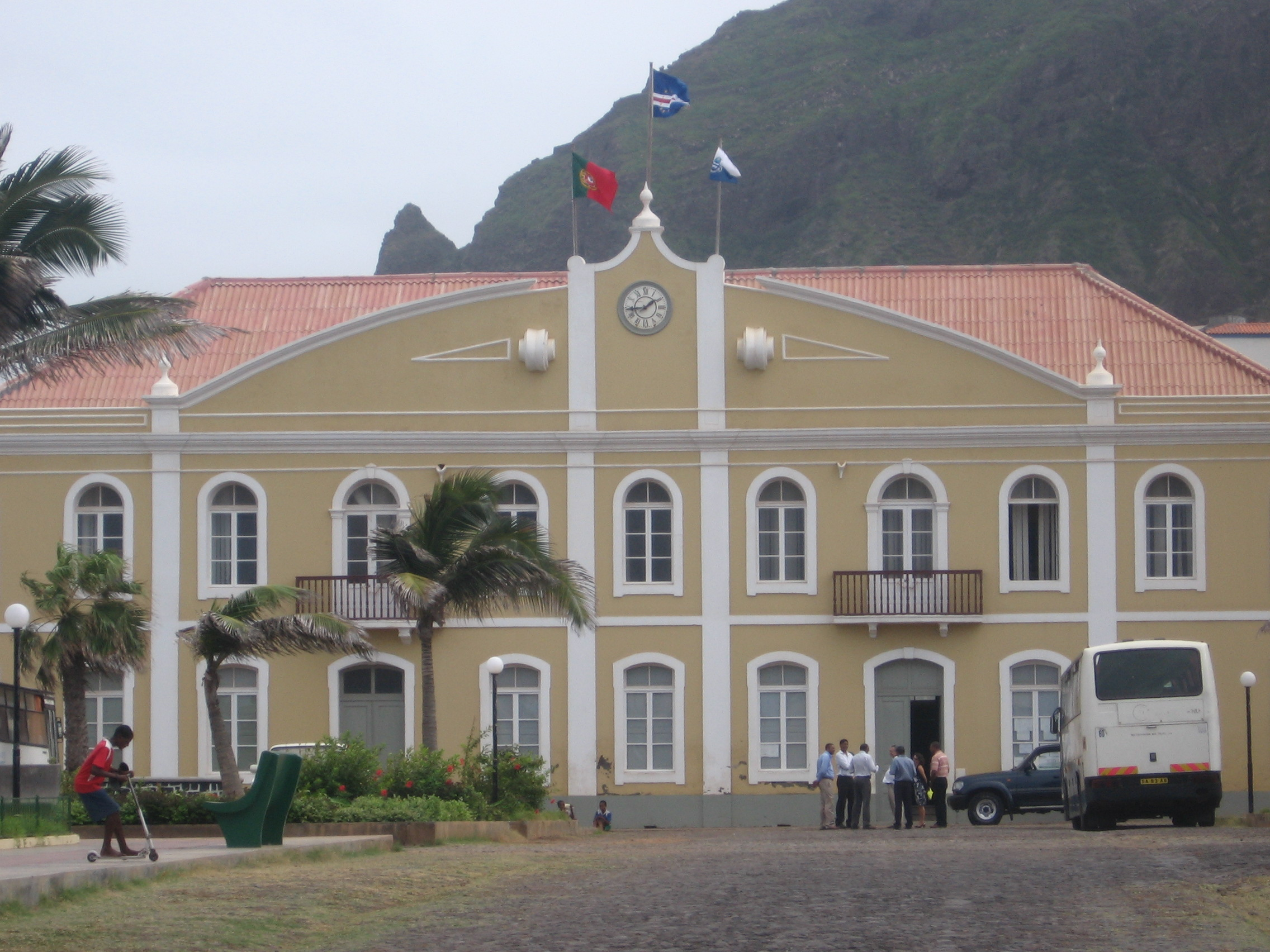
- Municipal hall of Ribeira Grande in Ponta do Sol

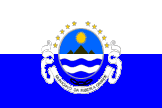
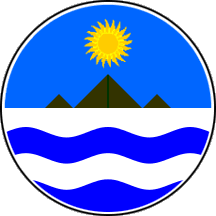
- Flag Seal

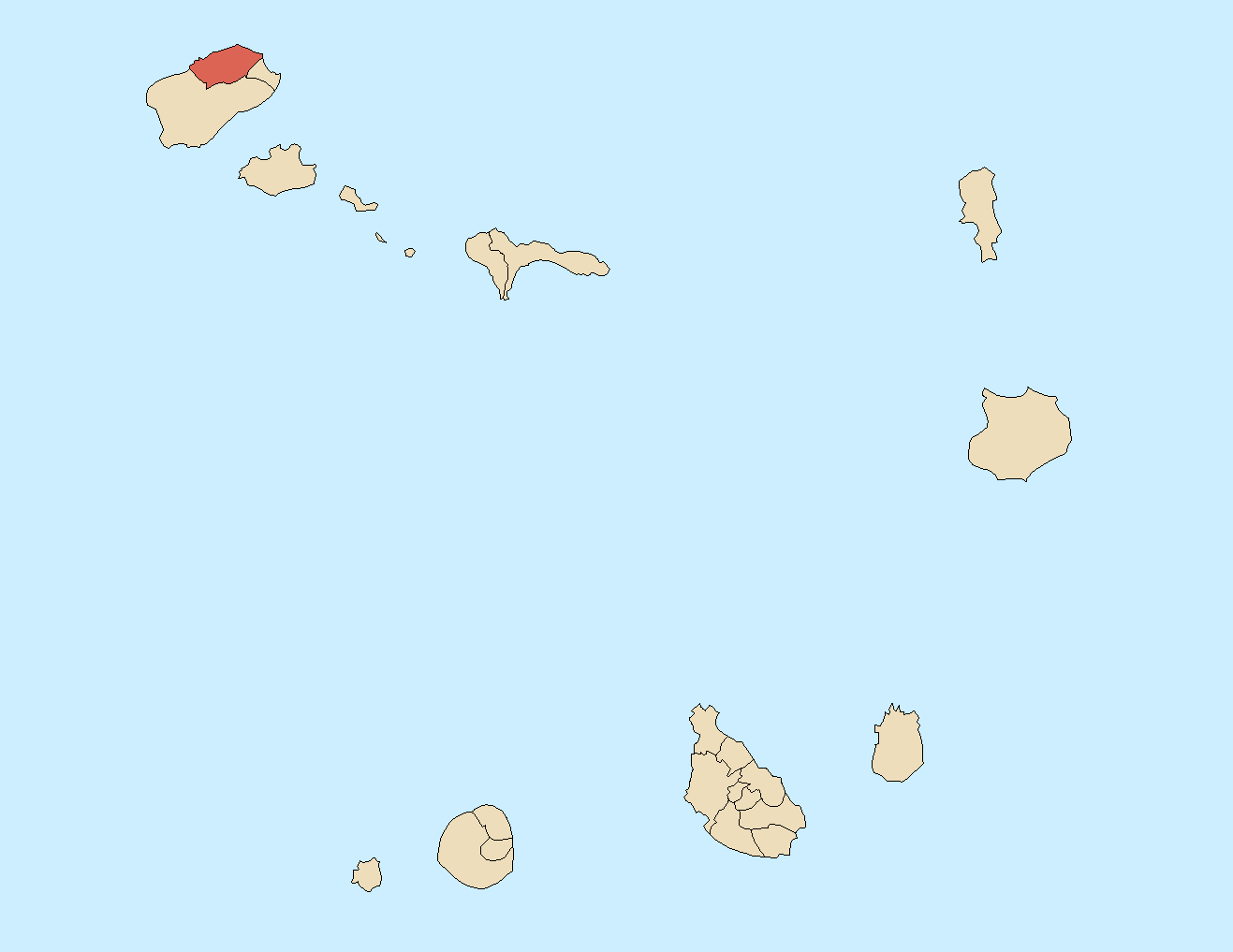
- Coordinates: 17.15°N 25.11°W
- Country: Cape Verde
- Island: Santo Antão
- Seat: Ponta do Sol

Area
  - Total: 166.5 km^{2} (64.3 sq mi)

Population (2010)
  - Total: 18,890
  - Density: 113.5/km^{2} (293.8/sq mi)
- ID: 11
- Website: Official website

Ribeira Grande is a concelho (municipality) of Cape Verde. Situated in the northern part of the island of Santo Antão, it covers one fifth of the island area (166.5 km^{2}), and is home to nearly half of its population (18,890 at the 2010 census). Its seat is the city Ponta do Sol.

== Subdivisions ==
The municipality consists of four freguesias (civil parishes):

- Nossa Senhora do Rosário
- Nossa Senhora do Livramento
- Santo Crucifixo
- São Pedro Apóstolo

== Demography ==
Population of Ribeira Grande (1940—2010)
Year	Population
1940	19,766
1950	15,444
1960	17,246
1970	22,873
1980	22,102
1990	20,851
2000	21,560
2010	18,890

== Geography ==
The municipality has a rugged landscape, stretching from the mountains in the interior of the island to the north coast. It has several deep river valleys, including those of Ribeira da Garça, Ribeira Grande and Ribeira da Torre. It borders the municipality Paul to the east and Porto Novo to the south. The protected areas Cova-Paul-Ribeira da Torre Natural Park, Moroços and Cruzinha lie (partly) within the municipality.

== History ==
In 1732 the Municipality of Santo Antão was created, with its seat in the town Ribeira Grande. In 1867 this was divided into the municipality of Paul (covering the area of current Paul and Porto Novo) and the municipality of Ribeira Grande. These were merged in 1895 into one municipality. The municipalities of Paul and Ribeira Grande were recreated in 1917.

== Politics ==
Since 2008, the Movement for Democracy (MpD) is the ruling party of the municipality. Its current president is Orlando Delgado (MpD). The results of the latest elections, in 2016:

Party	Municipal Council		Municipal Assembly	
Party	Votes%	Seats	Votes%	Seats
MpD	61.77	7	60.62	12
PAICV	24.77	0	24.81	4
UCID	8.51	0	9.64	1

== Persons ==
- António do Espírito Santo Fonseca, president of the National Assembly from 1996 to 2001
- Gabriel Mariano, Capeverdean essayist, novelist & poet
- Manuel de Novas, Capeverdean poet

== Twin towns ==
- Torres Novas, Portugal
- Ponta do Sol, Madeira Islands
