= List of islands in Macaronesia =

Macaronesia

This is a list of islands in Macaronesia, as ordered by area, max altitude and population.

== Islands over 10 square kilometres (3.9 sq mi) ==
Rank	Island's Name	Area (km^{2})	Area (sq mi)	Height (m)	Location	Population	Density (per km^{2})
1	Tenerife	2,034.38		3,715	Canary Islands	966,354	475
2	Fuerteventura	1,659.74		807	Canary Islands	126,227	76
3	Gran Canaria	1,560.11		1,956	Canary Islands	870,595	558
4	Santiago	991		1,392	Cape Verde	294,135	297
5	Lanzarote	845.94		671	Canary Islands	154,530	183
6	Santo Antão	785		1,979	Cape Verde	38,200	45
7	São Miguel	744.55		1,105	Azores	137,228	184
8	Madeira	740.7		1,862	Madeira	267,785	362
9	La Palma	708.32		2,423	Canary Islands	85,840	121
10	Boa Vista	631.1		387	Cape Verde	14,451	23
11	Fogo	475.6		2,829	Cape Verde	45,837	96
12	Pico	444.97		2,351	Azores	13,895	31
13	Terceira	400.28		1,021.2	Azores	53,311	133
14	São Nicolau	379.5		1,312	Cape Verde	12,424	33
15	La Gomera	369.76		1,487	Canary Islands	22,426	61
16	Maio	269		436	Cape Verde	6,980	26
17	El Hierro	268		1,501	Canary Islands	11,338	42
18	São Jorge	243.65		1,053.4	Azores	8,381	34
19	São Vicente	227		744	Cape Verde	81,014	357
20	Sal	216		406	Cape Verde	39,700	184
21	Faial	173.06		1,043	Azores	14,356	83
22	Flores	141.02		915	Azores	3,429	24
23	Santa Maria	96.87		586.8	Azores	5,414	56
24	Brava	336		976	Cape Verde	5,698	17
25	Graciosa	60.65		402	Azores	4,095	68
26	Porto Santo	42.17		517	Madeira	5,158	122
27	Santa Luzia	34.2		395	Cape Verde	0	0
28	La Graciosa	29.05		266	Canary Islands	734	25
29	Corvo	17.12		720	Azores	386	23
30	Alegranza	10.202		289	Canary Islands	0	0
31	Deserta Grande	10			Madeira	0	0

== Islands under 10 square kilometres (3.9 sq mi) ==
Rank	Island's Name	Area (km^{2})	Area (sq mi)	Height (m)	Location	Population	Density (per km^{2})
32	Lobos	4.679			Canary Islands	4	0
33	Bugio	3			Madeira	0	0
34	Ilhéu Grande	3			Cape Verde	0	0
35	Ilhéu Branco	2.78			Cape Verde	0	0
36	Selvagem Grande	2.45			Madeira	0	0
37	Ilhéu de Cima	1.5			Cape Verde	0	0
38	Montaña Clara	1.33			Canary Islands	0	0
39	Roque del Este	0.1			Canary Islands	0	0
