= Cabo de Santa Maria =

Cabo de Santa Maria may refer to:

- Cabo de Santa Maria (Cape Verde), a beach and coastal sector on Boa Vista, Cape Verde, whose popular name derives from the wreck of the cargo ship Cabo Santa Maria
- Cabo Santa Maria (ship), a Spanish cargo ship wrecked off Boa Vista in 1968
- Cabo de Santa Maria (Faro), the southernmost point of mainland Portugal
- Cabo de Santa Maria (Angola)
