= List of mountains in Cape Verde =

This is a list of mountains in Cabo Verde:

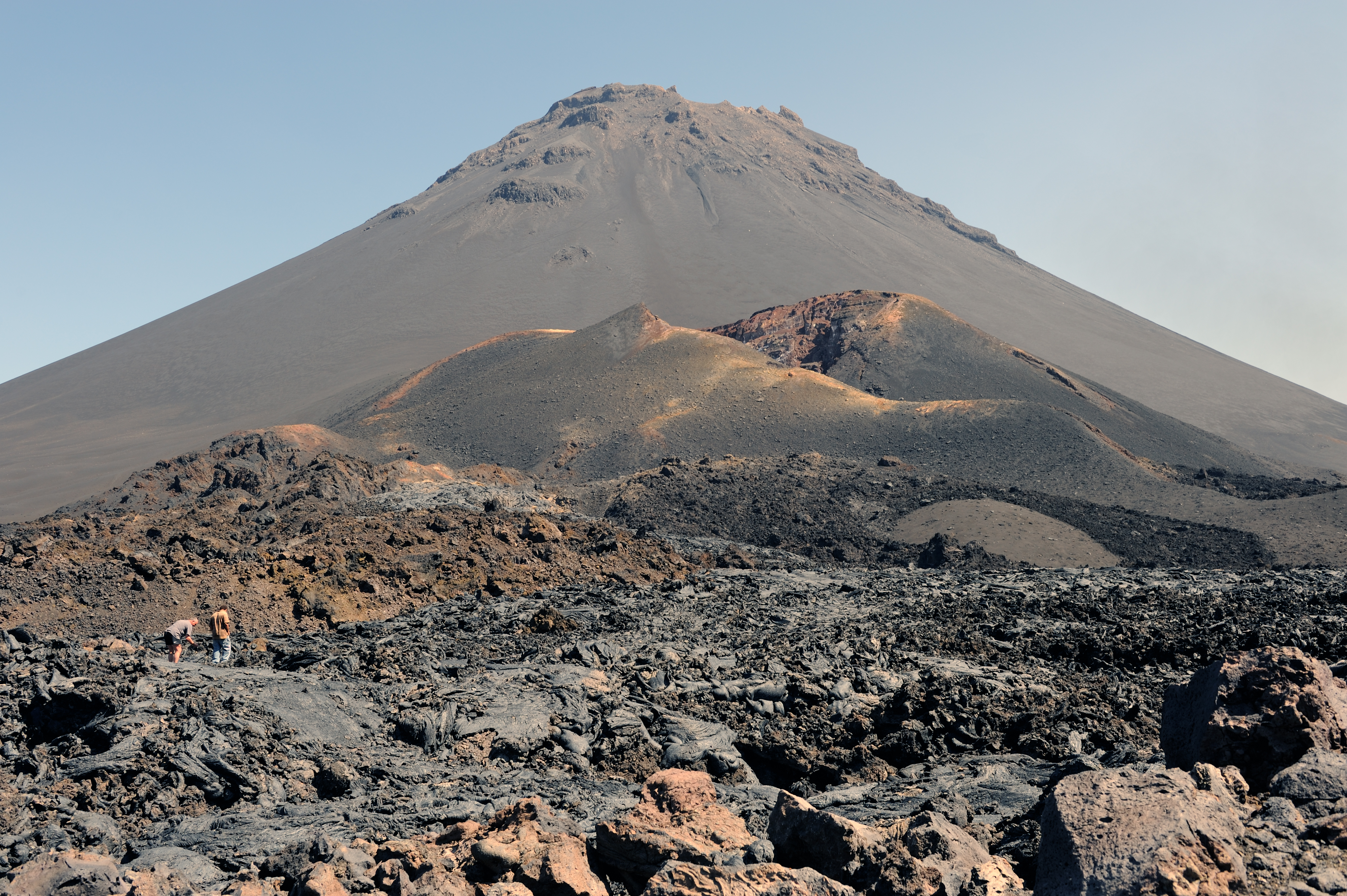
Pico do Fogo (2829 m), the highest summit in Fogo and the nation

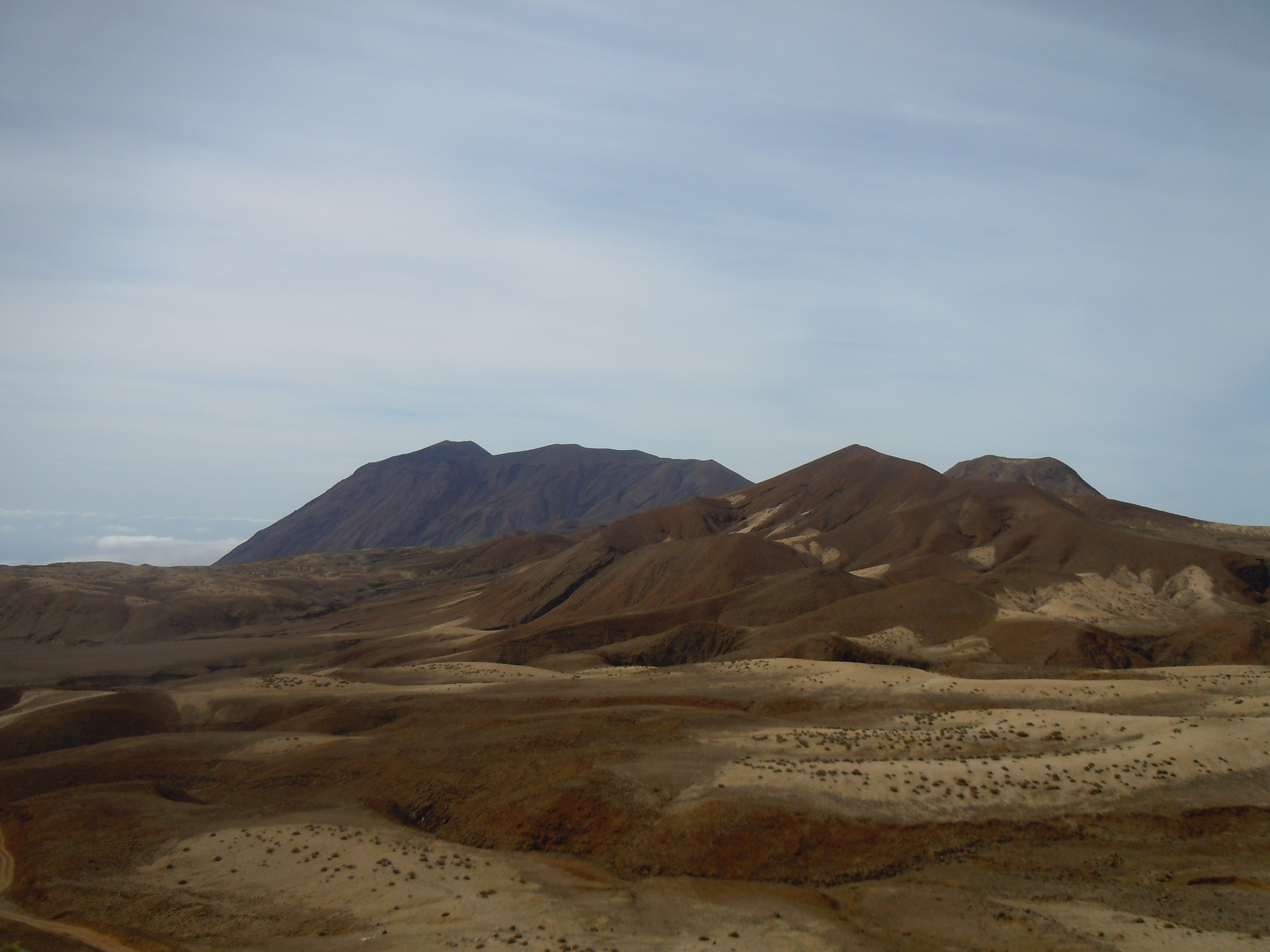
Tope de Coroa (1,983 m), the highest summit in Santo Antão

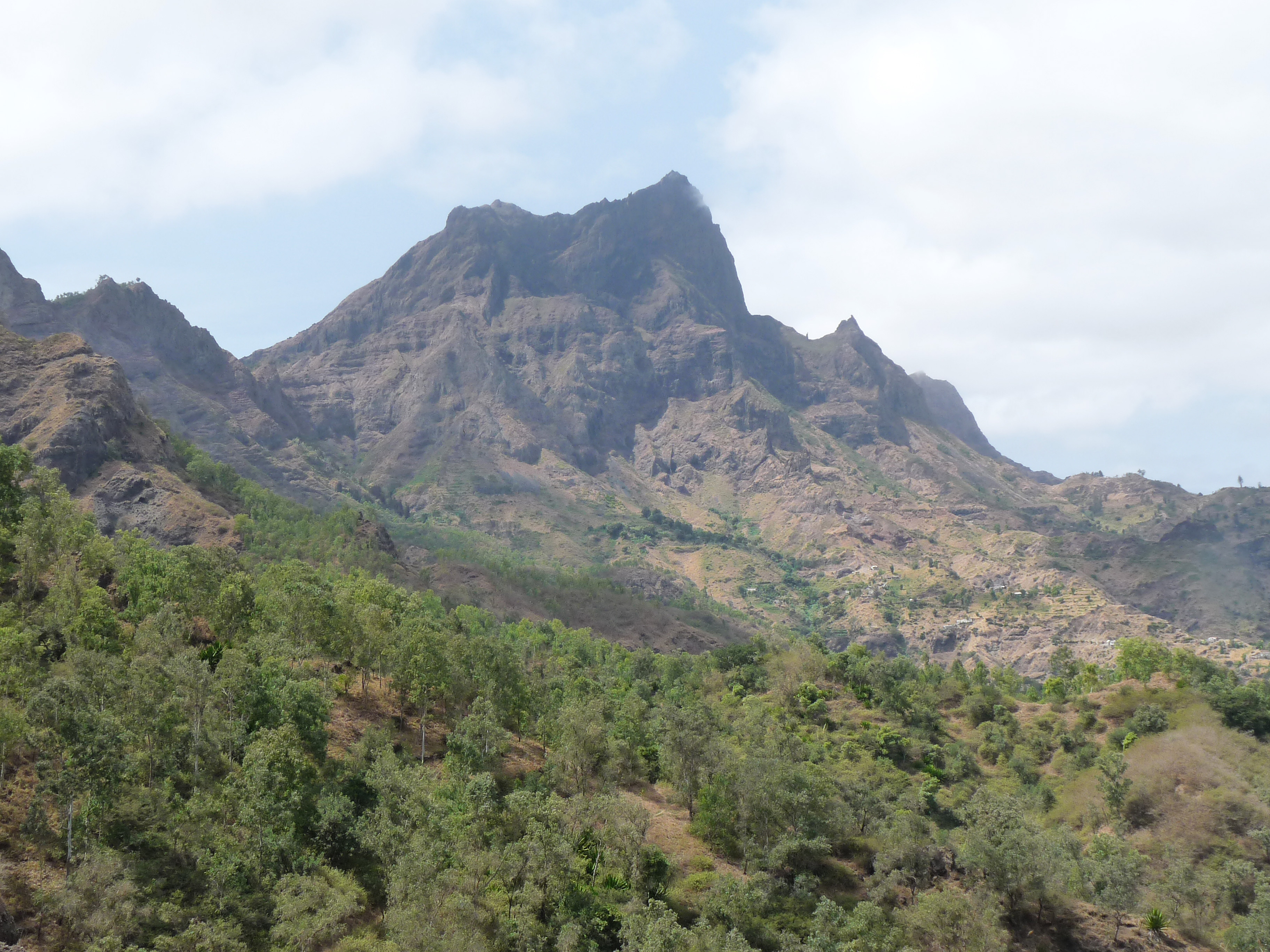
Pico de Antónia, highest point in Santiago

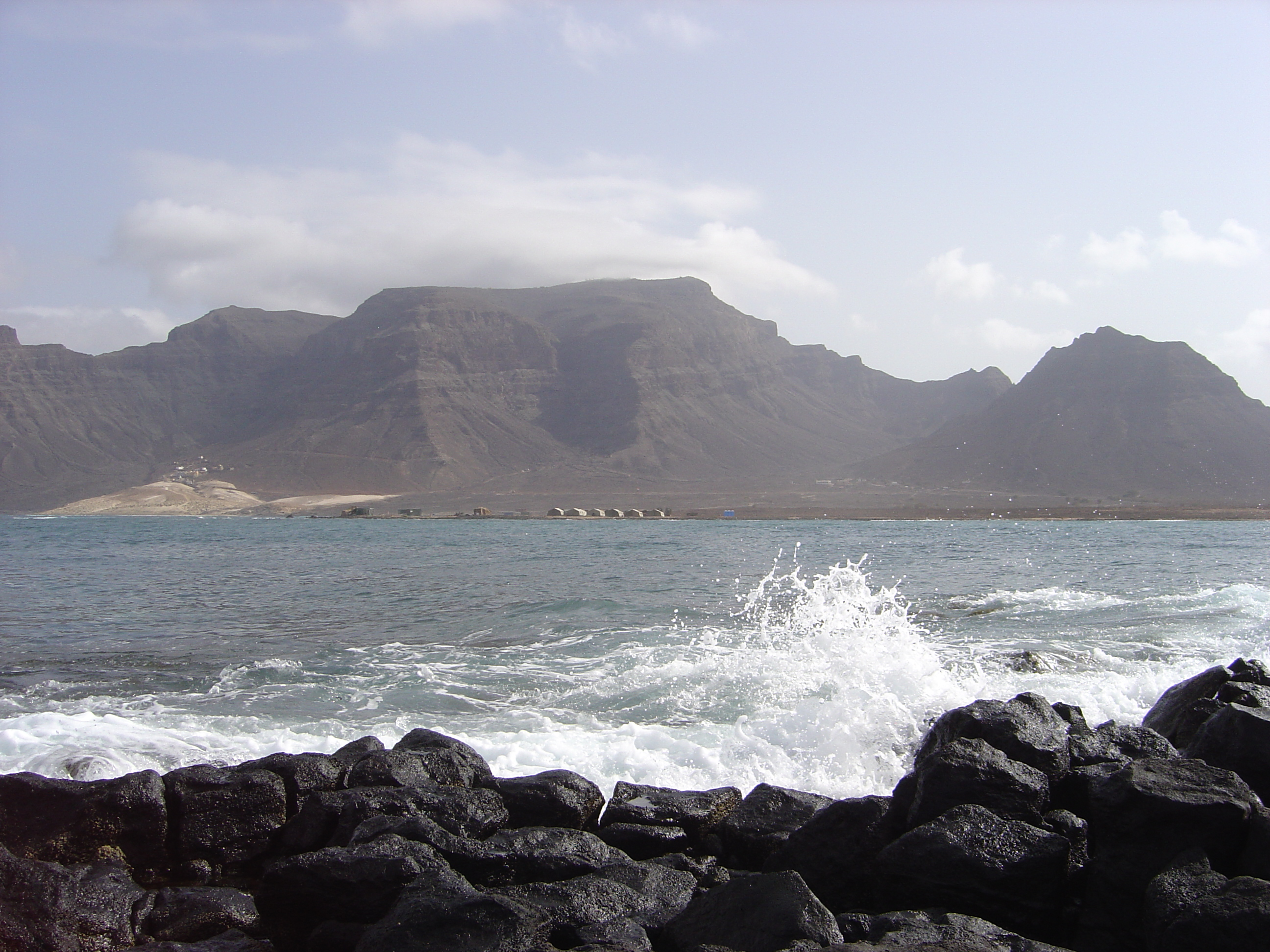
Monte Verde (750 m), highest point in São Vicente

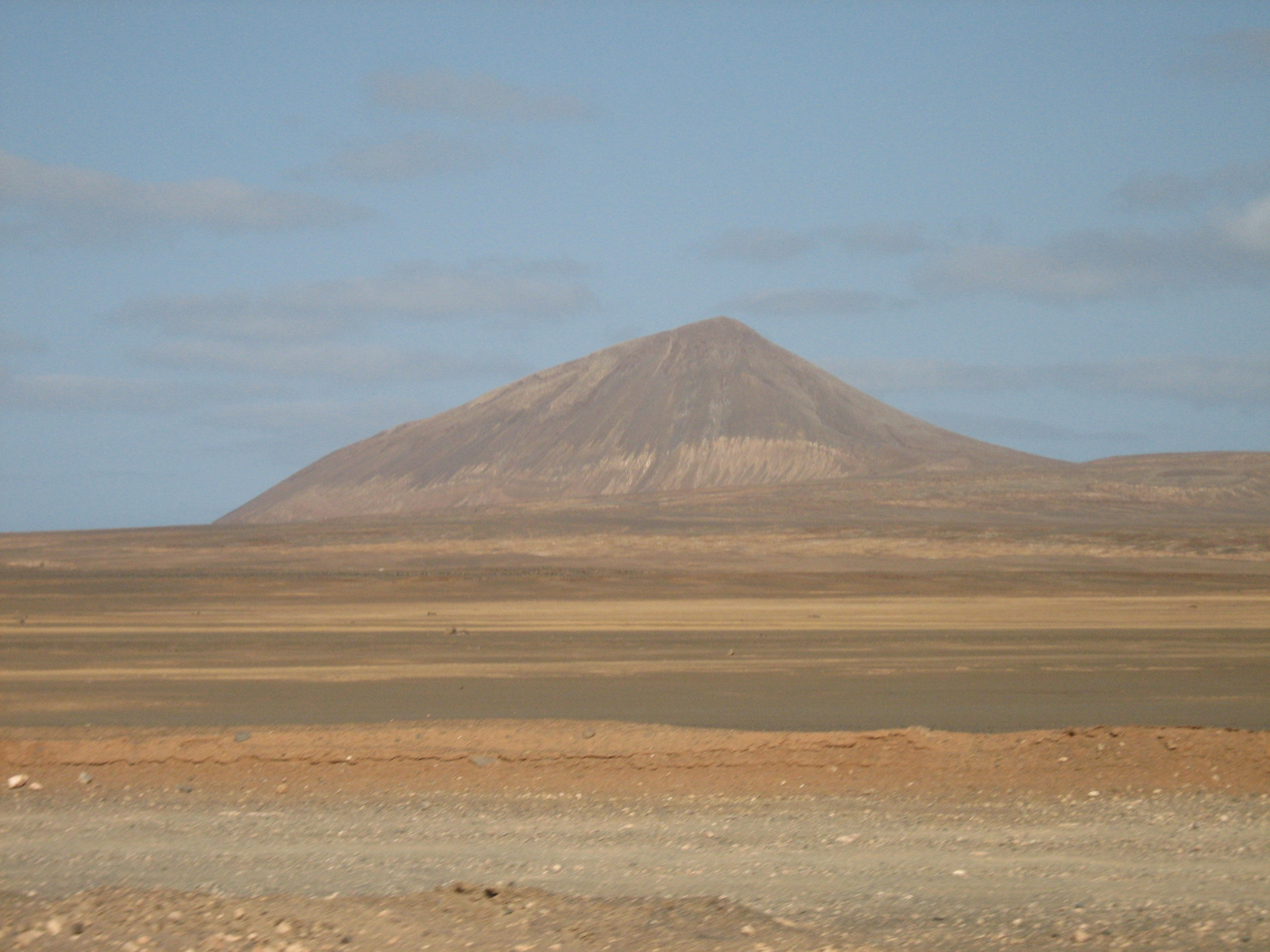
Monte Grande (406 m), highest point in Sal

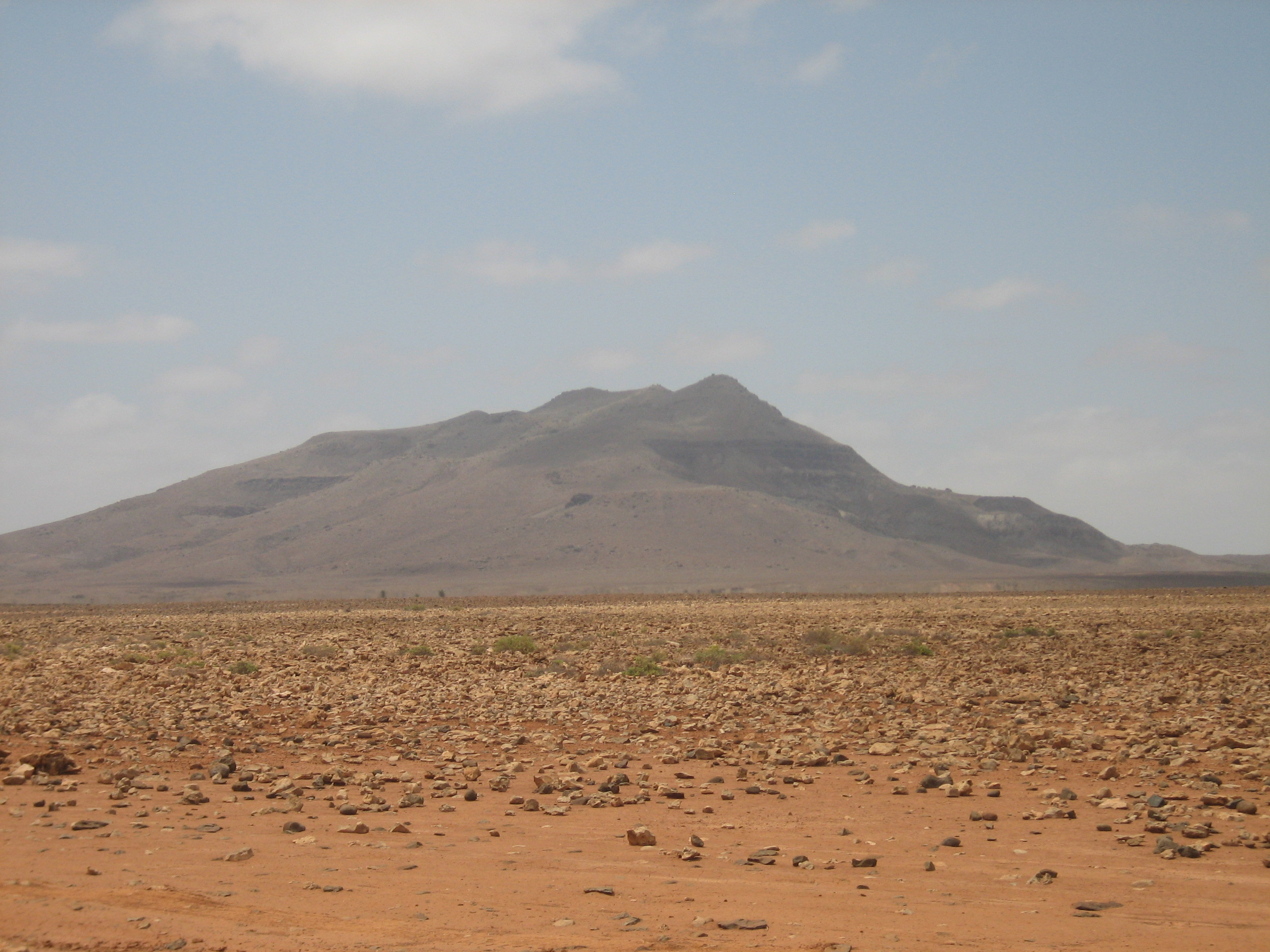
Monte Estância (387 m), highest point in Boa Vista

== List ==
| Name | Island | Elevation (m) |
|---|---|---|
| Pico de Alberto | São Nicolau | 598 |
| Pico de Antónia | Santiago | 1,392 (Note: The highest point on Santiago) |
| Morro de Areia | Boa Vista | 167 |
| Monte Batalha | Maio | 294 |
| Monte Bissau | São Nicolau | 615 |
| Bordeira | Fogo | 2,692 |
| Monte Caçador | Boa Vista | 355 |
| Cagarral | Sal | 173 |
| Caixa | São Vicente | 535 |
| Monte Cara | São Vicente | 490 |
| Tope de Coroa | Santo Antão | 1,979 (Note: The highest point on Santo Antão and in the Barlavento Islands) |
| Cova | Santo Antão | 1,166 |
| Pico da Cruz | Santo Antão | 1,585 |
| Monte Curral | Sal | 109 |
| Monte Estância | Boa Vista | 387 (Note: The highest point on Boa Vista) |
| Rocha Estância | Boa Vista | 357 |
| Pico do Fogo | Fogo | 2,829 (Note: The highest point on Fogo and Cape Verde) |
| Monte Fontainhas | Brava | 976 (Note: The highest point on Brava) |
| Pico Forcado | Boa Vista | 364 |
| Monte António Gomes | São Vicente | 362 |
| Monte Gordo | São Nicolau | 1,312 (Note: The highest point on São Nicolau) |
| Monte Graciosa | Santiago | 643 |
| Monte Grande | Sal | 406 (Note: The highest point on Sal) |
| Gudo de Cavaleiro | Santo Antão | 1,810 |
| Madeiral | São Vicente | 680 |
| Serra Malagueta | Santiago | 1,064 |
| Monte Montona | São Vicente | 242 |
| Monte Moroços | Santo Antão | 1,767 |
| Serra Negra | Sal | 104 |
| Morro Negro | Boa Vista | 156 m |
| Monte Penoso | Maio | 436 (Note: The highest point on Maio) |
| Rabo de Junco | Sal | 165 |
| Monte Santo António | Boa Vista | 379 |
| Monte São João | São Vicente | 154 |
| Monte Tchota | Santiago | 1,041 |
| Topona | Santa Luzia | 395 (Note: The highest point on Santa Luzia) |
| Monte das Vacas | Santiago | 437 |
| Monte Velha | Fogo | 1,482 |
| Pico do Vento | São Vicente | 434 |
| Fateixa | São Vicente | 571 |
| Monte Verde | São Vicente | 744 (Note: The highest point on São Vicente) |
| Viana | São Vicente | 163 |
| Vigia | Boa Vista | 146 |

== See also ==
- Lists of mountains by region
- Geography of Cape Verde
