= List of islands in the Atlantic Ocean =

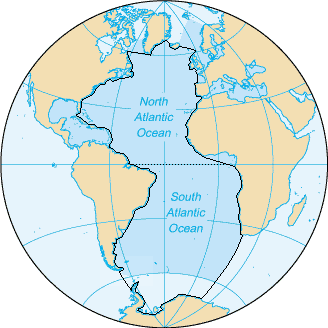
The IHO limits of the Atlantic Ocean

This is a list of islands in the Atlantic Ocean, the largest of which is Greenland. Note that the definition of the ocean used by the International Hydrographic Organization (IHO) excludes the seas, gulfs, bays, etc., bordering the ocean itself. Thus, for instance, not all of the islands of the United Kingdom are actually in or bordering on the Atlantic. For reference, islands in gulfs and seas are included in a separate section. Oceanic islands are formed by seamounts rising from the ocean floor with peaks above the surface of the ocean and are not parts of continental tectonic plates.

== List by subregion ==
=== North Atlantic Ocean ===
==== East ====
- Azores (Portugal)
  - São Miguel, Santa Maria, Terceira, Graciosa, São Jorge, Pico, Faial Island, Flores, Corvo
- Berlengas (Portugal)
- Bissagos Islands (Guinea-Bissau)
- Canary Islands (Spain)
  - Lanzarote, Fuerteventura, Gran Canaria, Tenerife, La Gomera, La Palma, El Hierro, La Graciosa
- Cape Verde Islands
  - Boa Vista, Brava, Fogo, Maio, Santo Antão, São Vicente, Santa Luzia, São Nicolau, Sal, Santiago
- British territories:
  - Great Britain
  - Anglesey (Wales, United Kingdom)
  - Isle of Man (British Crown Dependency)
  - Hebrides (Scotland, United Kingdom)
  - Orkney (Scotland, United Kingdom)
  - Shetland (Scotland, United Kingdom)
  - Isles of Scilly (England, United Kingdom)
  - Isle of Wight (England, United Kingdom)
  - Channel Islands an archipelago in the English Channel, off the French coast of Normandy which are dependencies of the British Crown.
- Ireland
  - Some of the minor islands of Ireland
- Madeira (Portugal)
  - Madeira Island, Porto Santo, Desertas, Selvagens
- Rockall
- São Tomé and Príncipe
- Gorée (Senegal)
- Îles de la Madeleine (Senegal)

==== North ====
- Faroe Islands (Denmark)
  - Borðoy, Eysturoy, Fugloy, Hestur, Kalsoy, Koltur, Kunoy, Lítla Dímun, Mykines, Nólsoy, Sandoy, Skúvoy, Stóra Dímun, Streymoy, Suðuroy, Svínoy, Vágar, Viðoy
- Greenland (Denmark)
  - Ammassalik, Anoraliuirsoq, Apusiaajik, Egger, Skjoldungen, Ile de France, Kulusuk
- Iceland
  - Inhabited islands: Vestmannaeyjar, Hrísey, Grímsey, Flatey. See also list here minor islands of Iceland
- Baffin Island (Canada)

==== West ====
- The Bahamas
- Bermuda (United Kingdom)
- Cuba
- Hispaniola (Haiti and the Dominican Republic)
- Leeward Islands:
  - Anguilla (United Kingdom), Antigua and Barbuda, Guadeloupe (France), Saint Kitts and Nevis, Saint Martin, Virgin Islands
- Newfoundland (Canada)
  - Baccalieu Island, Bell Island, Fogo Island, Funk Island, Kelly's Island, Random Island
- Oak Island (Canada)
- Puerto Rico (United States)
- Sable Island (Canada)
- Turks and Caicos Islands (United Kingdom)
- Coastal islands of the United States (north to south)
  - Matinicus Island, Monhegan Island, Mount Desert Island, Isles of Shoals, Boston Harbor Islands, Prudence Island, Conanicut Island, Aquidneck Island, Elizabeth Islands, Martha's Vineyard, Nantucket Island, Fishers Island, Block Island, Long Island, Fire Island, Manhattan Island, Roosevelt Island, Staten Island, Long Beach Island, Brigantine Island, Absecon Island, Pecks Beach Island, Ludlam Island, Seven Mile Island, Assateague Island, Chincoteague Island, Outer Banks, Sea Islands, Hilton Head Island, Key West (part of Florida Keys)
- Windward Islands:
  - Barbados, Dominica, Martinique (France), Saint Lucia, Saint Vincent and the Grenadines, Trinidad and Tobago

==== South ====
- Saint Peter and Saint Paul Archipelago (Brazil)

=== South Atlantic Ocean ===
- Ascension Island (United Kingdom)
- Saint Helena (United Kingdom)
- Tristan da Cunha (United Kingdom)
  - Gough Island (United Kingdom)
  - Inaccessible Island (United Kingdom)
  - Nightingale Island (United Kingdom)
- Trindade and Martim Vaz (Brazil)
- Saint Peter and Saint Paul Archipelago (Brazil)
- Rocas Atoll (Brazil)
- Fernando de Noronha (Brazil)
- Isla de Lobos (Uruguay)
- Isla Bermejo (Argentina)
- Tigres Island (Angola)
- Mercury Island (Namibia)
- Coastal islands of western South Africa
  - Dassen Island, Dyer and Geyser Islands, Malgas Island, Robben Island, Schaapeneiland, Seal Island

==== Subantarctic region ====
- Falkland Islands (United Kingdom, contested by Argentina)
  - East Falkland
  - West Falkland
  - Barren Island, Beauchene Island, Beaver Island, Bleaker Island, Carcass Island, George Island, Jason Islands, Keppel Island, Lively Island, New Island, Pebble Island, Saunders Island, Sealion Island, Speedwell Island, Staats Island, Weddell Island, West Point Island
- Tierra del Fuego (Argentina and Chile)
  - Isla Grande (Argentina and Chile)
  - Isla de los Estados (Argentina)
  - Isla Observatorio (Argentina)
  - Gable Island (Argentina)

==== Antarctic region ====
- Bouvet Island (Norway)
- South Georgia and the South Sandwich Islands (United Kingdom, contested by Argentina)

== In gulfs and seas ==
Within the Caribbean Sea:

- San Andrés, Providencia and Santa Catalina (Colombia)
- List of islands in the Caribbean

Within the Gulf of Guinea:

- Equatorial Guinea
  - List of islands of Equatorial Guinea
  - Bioko, Annobón, Corisco, Elobey Grande, Elobey Chico

Within the Norwegian Sea:

- Lofoten, Norway, which has four major islands
- Hinnøya, Norway and more in Vesterålen

Within the Gulf of St. Lawrence:

- Anticosti (Canada)
- Cape Breton Island (Canada)
- Magdalen Islands (Canada)
- Prince Edward Island (Canada)
- Saint Pierre and Miquelon (France)
  - Saint Pierre Island, Miquelon Island, Ile aux Marins, Grand Colombier

Others:

- List of islands in the Baltic Sea
- List of islands of the British Isles
- List of islands in the Mediterranean
- List of islands in Macaronesia

== See also ==
- Lists of islands (by ocean, continent, etc.)
