= Monte Santo António =

Mountain in Cape Verde

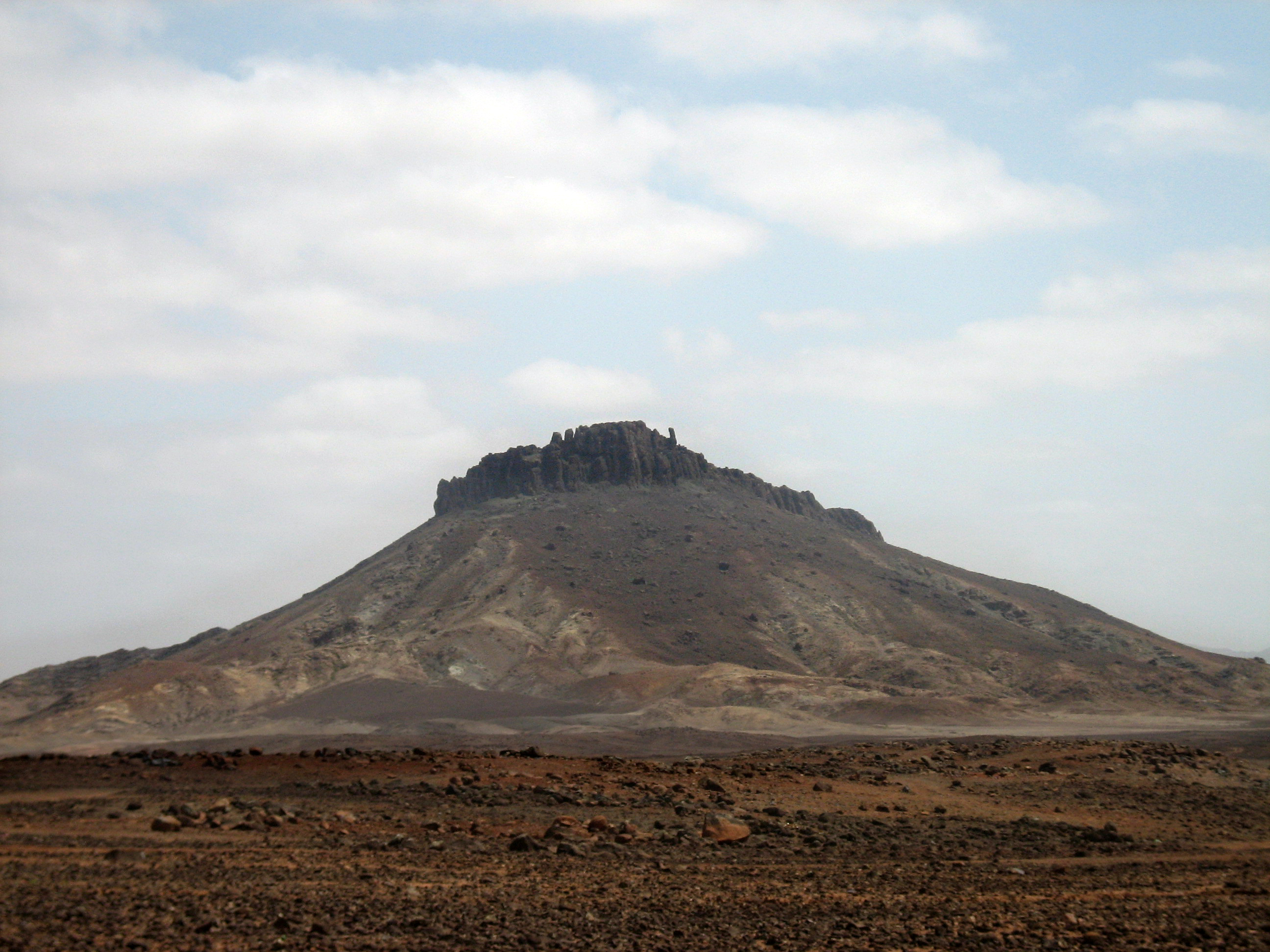
- Monte Santo António

Highest point
- Elevation: 379 m (1,243 ft)
- Listing: List of mountains in Cape Verde
- Coordinates: 16°03′50″N 22°53′02″W

Geography
- Location within Cape Verde
- Location: southeastern Boa Vista

Monte Santo António is a mountain in the southwestern part of the island Boa Vista in Cape Verde. At 379 m (1,243 ft) elevation, it is the island's second highest point. Like Rocha Estância and Monte Estância, it rises steeply from the surrounding plains. It is part of a protected natural area under the statute of natural monument, covering 459 hectares (1,130 acres).

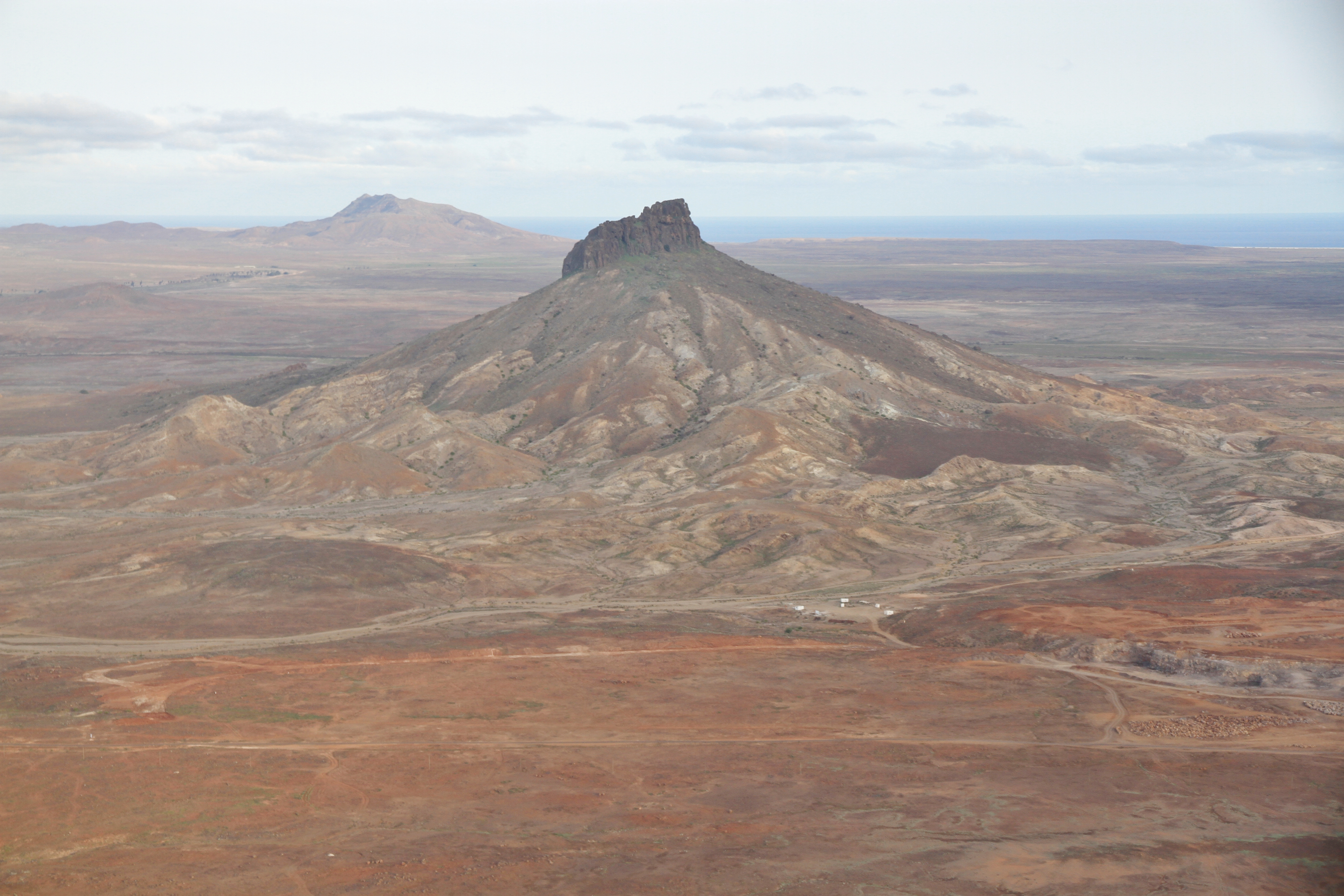
Aerial view of Monte Santo António with Rocha Estância in the background

== See also ==
- List of mountains in Cape Verde
