= Cabo Santa Maria (ship) =

Spanish cargo ship wrecked off Cape Verde in 1968

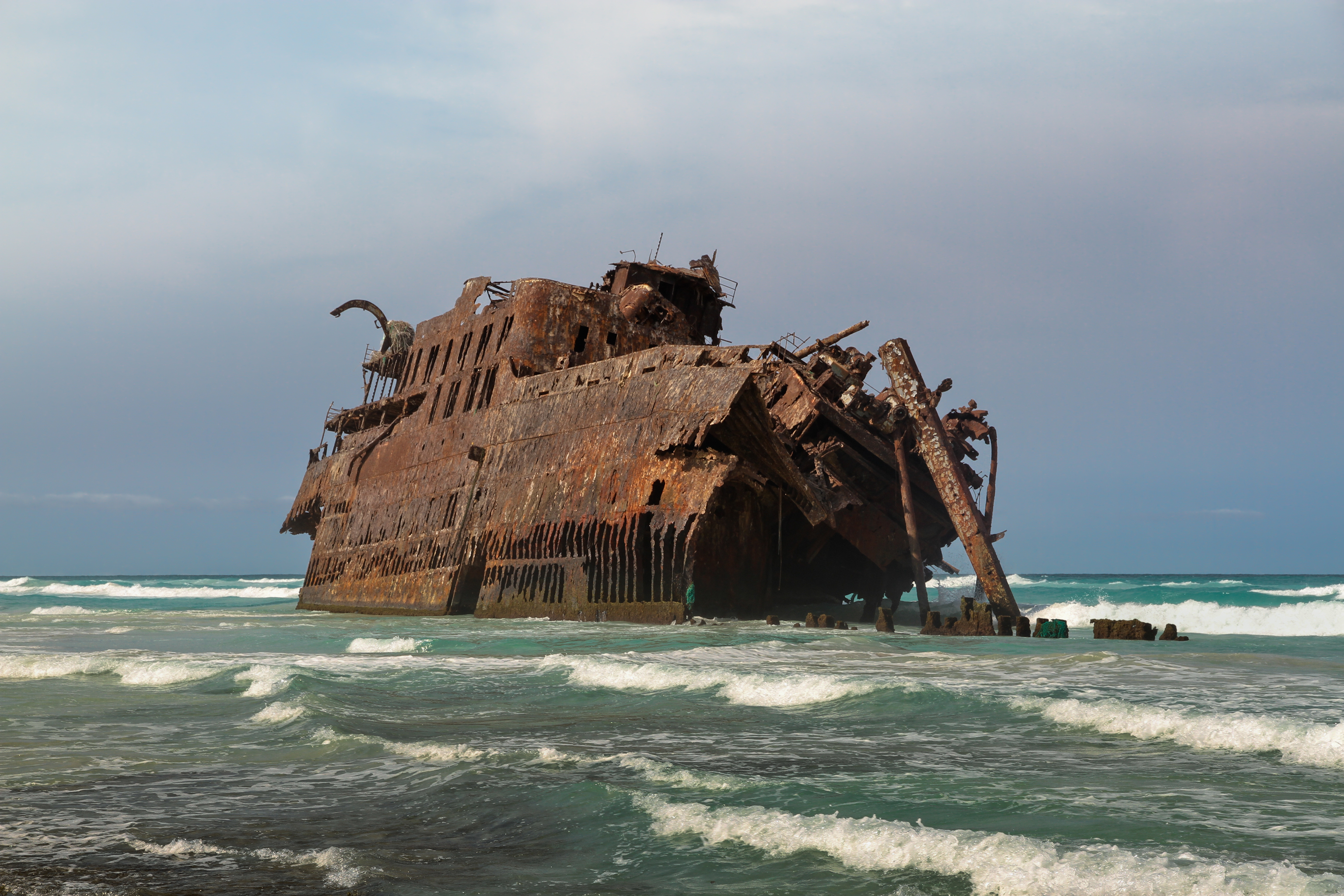
- The wreck of Cabo Santa Maria off Boa Vista in 2010

History
- Name: Hernando de Solís (at launch); Díaz de Solís (1957–1963/64); Cabo Santa María (1963/64–1968)
- Owner: Naviera Comercial Aspe (1957–1963/64); Ybarra y Compañía (1963/64–1968)
- Port of registry: Spain
- Builder: Empresa Nacional Bazán, Cartagena
- Launched: 20 December 1955
- Completed: 1957
- In service: 1957
- Out of service: 1 September 1968
- Identification: IMO number: 5089752; Official number 508975; Call sign EAQS
- Fate: Ran aground at Boa Vista, Cape Verde, and declared a total loss; wreck remains off Praia de Atalanta

General characteristics
- Class & type: Type Y
- Type: General cargo ship with passenger accommodation
- Tonnage: 4,972 GRT; 2,849 NRT; 6,265 t deadweight (1968 register); 7,000 t deadweight (design)
- Displacement: 10,950 t at full load (design)
- Length: 131.40 m (431 ft 1 in) overall; 122.00 m (400 ft 3 in) between perpendiculars
- Beam: 17.20 m (56 ft 5 in)
- Draught: 7.48 m (24 ft 6 in) at full load
- Depth: 10.83 m (35 ft 6 in) to upper deck
- Installed power: 7,300 bhp at 125 rpm
- Propulsion: One Sulzer 10-SD-72 ten-cylinder, two-stroke diesel engine; one propeller
- Speed: 16.5 kn (30.6 km/h; 19.0 mph) service; 17.95 kn (33.24 km/h; 20.66 mph) on trials
- Capacity: 11,197 m^{3} (395,400 cu ft) bale cargo; 12 passengers
- Crew: 38 (design); 37 on final voyage

Cabo Santa Maria (Spanish: Cabo Santa María) was a Spanish general cargo ship built by Empresa Nacional Bazán at Cartagena, Spain. She was one of four Type Y merchant ships ordered under the new-construction programme of the state-owned Empresa Nacional Elcano. Launched on 20 December 1955 as Hernando de Solís, she entered service in 1957 as Díaz de Solís for Naviera Comercial Aspe. Ybarra y Compañía acquired and renamed her in 1963 or 1964; contemporary and later registers differ by one year.

On 1 September 1968, while making her 28th outward voyage from Europe to South America, the ship ran aground in Salinas Bay on the north coast of Boa Vista, Cape Verde. All 37 crew members were reported safe. Attempts to refloat her failed and she was declared a total loss. The unloading of her cargo involved residents from across the island and entered local memory as a providential supply of food during a period of scarcity. The wreck became a visual symbol of Boa Vista, and the adjoining part of Praia de Atalanta came to be popularly known as Cabo Santa Maria beach.

== Design and construction ==
=== Type Y programme ===
Cabo Santa Maria originated in the second phase of Empresa Nacional Elcano's fleet-building programme. The Type Y design comprised four open-shelter-deck cargo liners. The first pair were built at Cádiz and the Y-3 and Y-4 at Bazán's Cartagena yard. Their project names commemorated figures associated with Spanish exploration: Rodrigo de Triana, Andrés de Urdaneta, Hernando de Solís and Pedro de Valdivia.

The design called for a maximum length of 131.50 m (431 ft 5 in), a length between perpendiculars of 122 m (400 ft 3 in), a beam of 17.20 m (56 ft 5 in), and a loaded draught of 7.48 m (24 ft 6 in). At full load, the projected displacement was 10,950 tonnes and deadweight 7,000 tonnes. The intended service speed was 16.5 kn (30.6 km/h; 19.0 mph), with accommodation for twelve passengers and 38 crew.

=== Launch and entry into service ===
The contract for the Y-3 was signed on 4 July 1953. Her hull was assembled on slipway No. 2 at Cartagena and launched on 20 December 1955, one hundred days after assembly began. She was named Hernando de Solís, and Carmen Hierro de González-Aller served as sponsor.

During construction, Empresa Nacional Elcano agreed to sell the vessel to Naviera Comercial Aspe, commonly known as Navicoas, and she was renamed Díaz de Solís. Sea trials took place off Cartagena on 2 January 1957. At half load she achieved a corrected speed of 17.95 kn (33.24 km/h; 20.66 mph) at 132 rpm, 0.95 kn (1.76 km/h; 1.09 mph) above the contract speed. The transfer was executed through successive deeds from Bazán to Elcano and from Elcano to Navicoas. By 6 February the ship was ready to leave Cartagena under her new owner's house flag.

=== Cargo handling and propulsion ===
The completed Y-3 measured 131.40 m (431 ft 1 in) overall and 122 m (400 ft 3 in) between perpendiculars, with a beam of 17.20 m (56 ft 5 in) and a depth of 10.83 m (35 ft 6 in) to the upper deck. Her holds and tween decks provided 11,197 m^{3} (395,400 cu ft) of bale-cargo space. Five exposed hatches had Elcano–MacGregor steel covers. Each hatch was served by two 5-tonne derricks, while Nos. 3 and 4 holds also had one 25-tonne derrick each.

Propulsion was provided by a single Sulzer 10-SD-72 ten-cylinder, two-stroke, cross-scavenged diesel engine manufactured at Winterthur. It developed 7,300 bhp at 125 rpm and drove one propeller. The vessel received Lloyd's Register's highest class and was later listed at 4,972 GRT.

== Commercial service ==
Names and operation of the ship
Period	Name	Owner or operator	Status
1955–1957	Hernando de Solís	Empresa Nacional Elcano	Launch name during construction; sold to Navicoas before entering service
1957–1963/64	Díaz de Solís	Naviera Comercial Aspe (Navicoas)	Entry into service and first commercial period
1963/64–1968	Cabo Santa Maria	Ybarra y Compañía	Mediterranean–Brazil–Río de la Plata service; total loss at Boa Vista

The initial service proposed for Díaz de Solís and her sister Pedro de Valdivia linked Seville with ports in North America. Both ships were subsequently acquired by Ybarra y Compañía and renamed Cabo Santa María and Cabo Santa Marta, respectively. The 1968 edition of Lloyd's Register lists the former name as "Diaz de Solis-63”, while later fleet histories date the purchase from Navicoas to 1964. In Ybarra's surviving files the vessel is styled Cabo Santa María III, followed by "formerly Díaz de Solís".

The same register records 4,972 GRT, 2,849 NRT and a deadweight of 6,265 tonnes, together with official number 508975 and call sign EAQS. The 7,000-tonne deadweight figure in the technical literature was the design value.

Under Ybarra, the ship joined the company's service between the Mediterranean, Brazil and the Río de la Plata. A photograph catalogued by the Maritime Museum of Barcelona shows her at Barcelona under her new name and Ybarra markings.

== Grounding at Boa Vista ==
=== Final voyage ===
Approximate location of the wreck in Cape Verde

The Provincial Historical Archive of Seville preserves manifests for the vessel's 28th outward voyage. Cargo was loaded at Tarragona on 14 August 1968, Barcelona on 17 August, Marseille on 20 August, Genoa on 21 August, Cartagena on 23 August, Algeciras on 24 August, Seville on 26 August and Cádiz on 27 August. Destinations shown in the archive catalogue include Rio de Janeiro, Santos, Montevideo and Buenos Aires.

Cabo Santa Maria sailed from Santa Cruz de Tenerife on 29 August, bound for Rio de Janeiro. In the early hours of 1 September she grounded on a sandbank in Salinas Bay on Boa Vista's north coast, at approximately 16°12′11″N 22°51′53″W. A contemporary Spanish report identified the master as Captain Fernando Sabín and stated that all 37 members of the crew were safe. A 2018 retrospective instead called the commander "Fernando de Solis", whereas Hernando de Solís and Díaz de Solís were earlier names of the ship.

No conclusive cause was published. A retrospective account in the Cape Verdean newspaper A Nação reported that the cause had not been disclosed and treated later suggestions of human error as unverified.

=== Salvage attempts ===
The port tug Damão was sent from Mindelo but lacked sufficient power to pull the ship from the bank. Other ocean-going tugs subsequently took part while the crew remained aboard during the salvage work. On 10 September, Spanish press reported that nautical charts had been requested urgently to support the operation.

Ybarra's archive catalogue records statements by the captain, copies of deck logs, the crew list and salvage correspondence. It also documents an attempt by the ocean-going tug Tasman Zee between 23 November 1968 and 24 January 1969, followed by a technical report dated 18 February 1969. None of the attempts refloated the vessel, which was declared a total loss and abandoned off the beach.

=== Unloading and local impact ===
By the end of September, a decision had been made to land approximately 1,720 tonnes of cargo. With no road to the site and little mechanical equipment, much of the work was done manually. The operation involved residents of Boa Vista, officials and workers from other islands, and continued for several months. Ybarra's files include inventories of goods landed and sold at auction, correspondence with shippers and insurers, and general-average records extending to 1974.

The cargo included machinery, fertiliser, chemicals and food. In oral accounts collected by A Nação, oil, olives, flour, wine and other provisions helped feed islanders during a period of drought and hunger. The episode was remembered locally as a pão por Deus, or providential supply, giving the wreck a social significance distinct from the financial loss to the shipowner.

== Bells for Brasília Cathedral ==
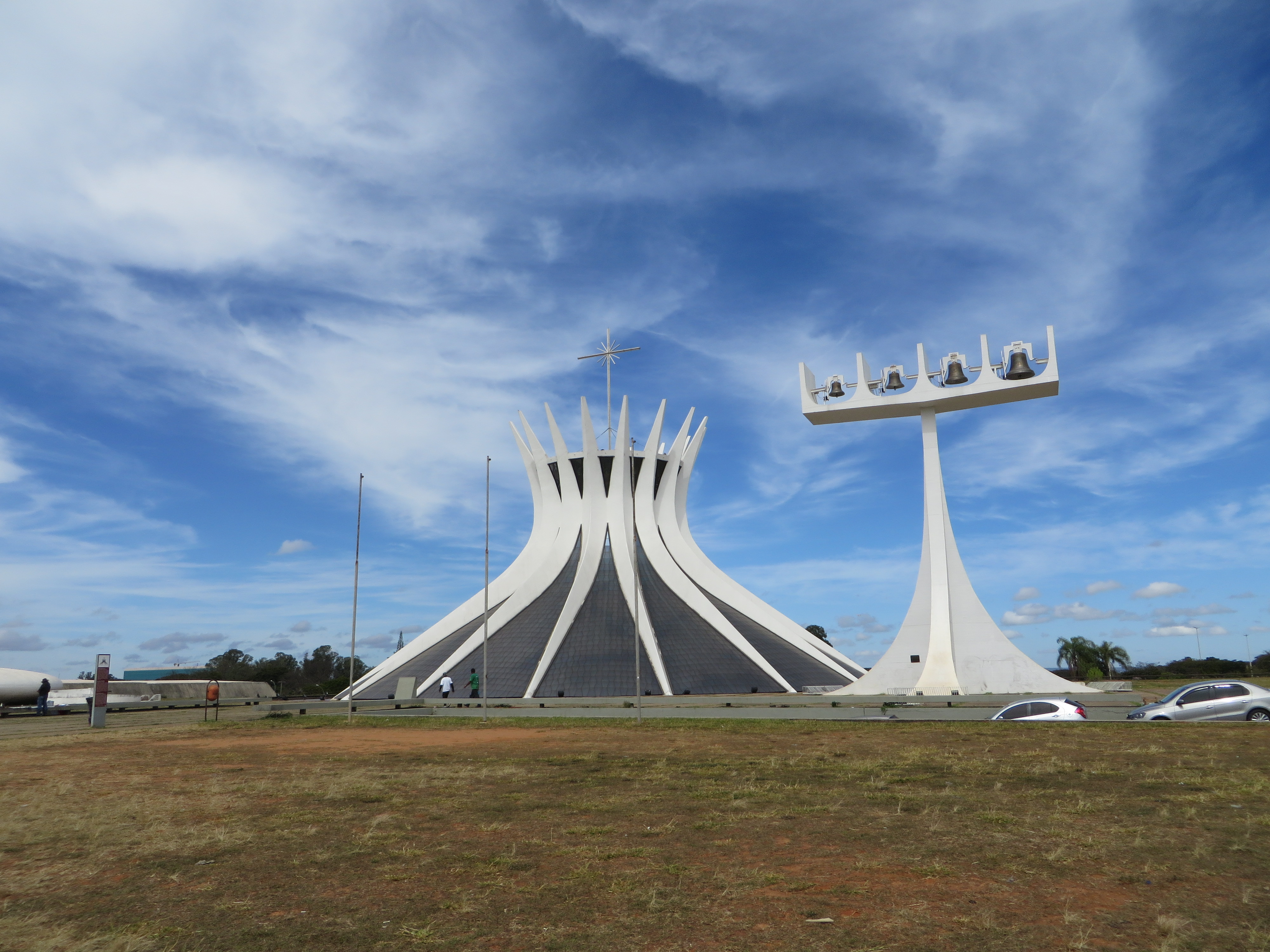
The bell tower of Brasília Cathedral. Its present bells bear the names of the set carried aboard Cabo Santa Maria, but the available accounts do not establish that they are the same physical objects.

Among the cargo were four bronze bells intended for the new Cathedral of Brasília. Contemporary press reported a combined weight of 8,200 kg (18,100 lb) and said that the shipment was consigned to the Spanish ambassador in Brazil. Cast by the Viuda de Ángel Perea foundry of Miranda de Ebro, the bells were named Santa María, Niña, Pinta and Pilarica. The first three names recalled the vessels associated with Columbus's first voyage, and the fourth referred to Our Lady of the Pillar.

The bells were being reported as lost by October 1968. Later accounts differ over their fate. A Nação reported that the originals were recovered three years later and returned to the foundry to be recast. A Brazilian account states that a replacement set was made, reached Brasília on 2 July 1972 and was eventually installed in 1977. The cathedral now has four bells with the same names, weighing between 700 and 3,200 kg, in a bell tower designed by Oscar Niemeyer and inaugurated in 1977.

== Wreck and legacy ==
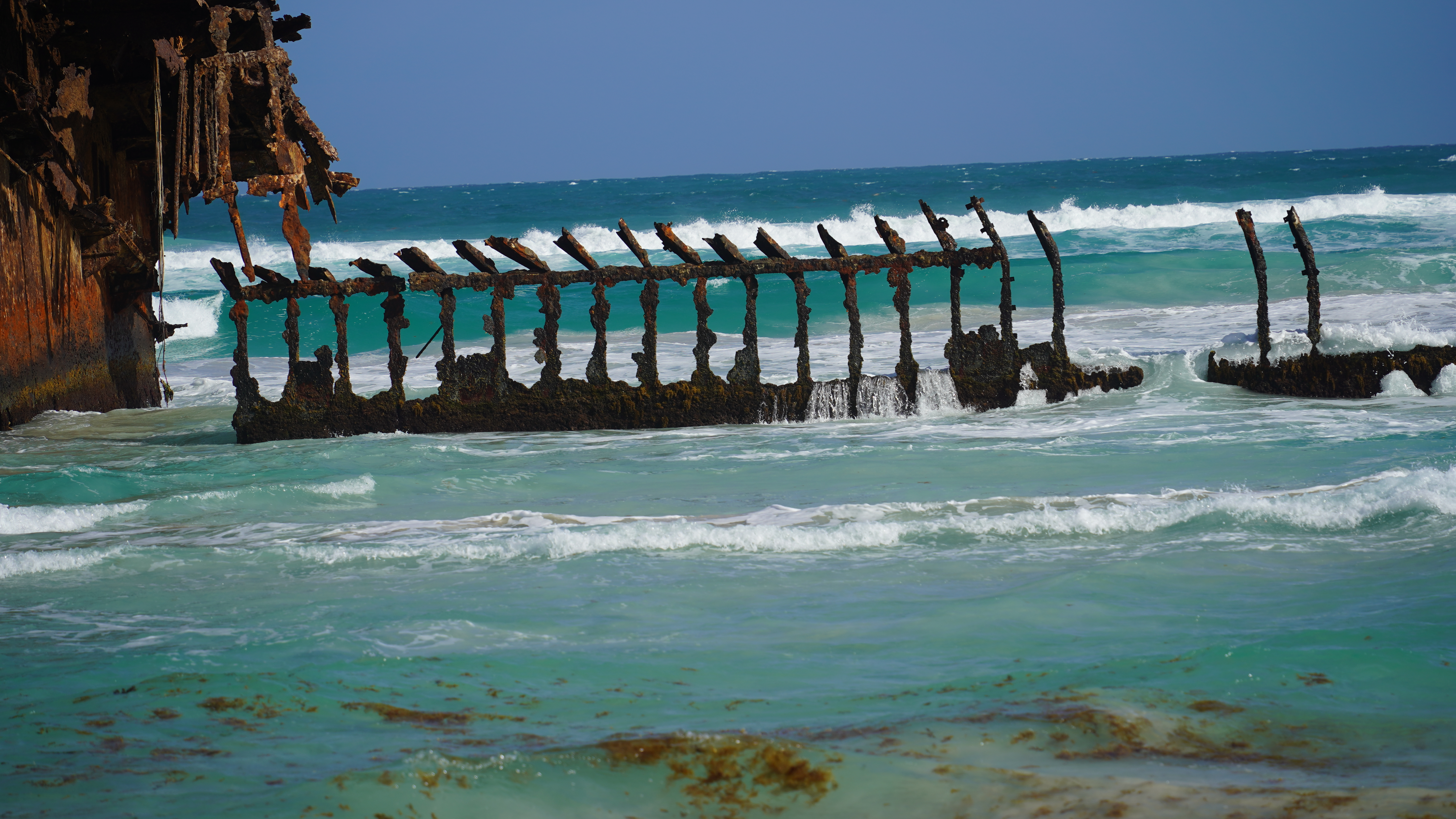
The remains of Cabo Santa Maria in January 2023.

The coast had been known as Praia de Atalanta after the earlier loss of a Scandinavian sailing vessel named Atalanta. After 1968, the section containing the new wreck came to be popularly called Cabo Santa Maria beach. The hull, lying close to the shore, has progressively deteriorated through surf, storms and corrosion.

The wreck became a recurring subject of postcards, books and photography, as well as a regular stop on excursions around Boa Vista. Cape Verdean press has described it as a symbol of both the island and the country. In 2025, the travel section of El País included Cabo Santa Maria among the archipelago's most photographed places. Its local meaning combines the image of the wreck with memories of the communal unloading operation and the food that reached the population.

The surviving company records are held in the Ybarra collection of the Provincial Historical Archive of Seville. The catalogue describes manifests from the final voyage, statements by the captain and crew, navigation logs, technical reports, insurance and salvage files, cargo inventories, and the settlement of the general average. The Maritime Museum of Barcelona holds a photograph of the ship in service before the grounding.

== See also ==
- Praia de Atalanta
- History of Cape Verde
