= Limonium jovibarba =

Conservation status
- Critically Endangered (IUCN 3.1)

Scientific classification
- Kingdom: Plantae
- Clade: Embryophytes
- Clade: Tracheophytes
- Clade: Angiosperms
- Clade: Eudicots
- Order: Caryophyllales
- Family: Plumbaginaceae
- Genus: Limonium
- Species: L. jovibarba

Binomial name
- Limonium jovibarba (Webb ex Boiss.) Kunze

Synonyms
- Limonium jovi-barba, Webb; Statice jovibarba, Webb

Species of flowering plant

Limonium jovibarba is a species of flowering plants of the family Plumbaginaceae. The species is endemic to Cape Verde. It is listed as critically endangered by the IUCN. The species was named by Carl Ernst Otto Kunze in 1891. Its local name is carqueja, a name that may also refer to the related species Limonium brunneri and Limonium braunii.

== Distribution and ecology ==
Limonium jovibarba occurs in humid cracks of rocky cliffs between 50 and 450 metres (160 and 1,480 ft) elevation. It is restricted to the islands of São Vicente (Monte Verde and Monte António Gomes) and São Nicolau (western part).
