= Monte Caçador and Pico Forcado Protected Countryside =

Protected area in Cape Verde

Monte Caçador Pico Forcado Mesa Cágado
- Location within Cape Verde

Highest point
- Elevation: 364 m (1,194 ft)
- Coordinates: 16°7′N 22°46′W

Geography
- Location: East central Boa Vista

Monte Caçador and Pico Forcado Protected Countryside (Portuguese: Paisagem protegido de Monte Caçador e Pico Forcado) is a protected area covering 3,357 hectares (12.96 sq mi) of land in the eastern part of the island of Boa Vista in Cape Verde. It is the most important mountain formation on the island, but not the highest.

The alignment of the peaks forms a tiny mountain range that consists Monte Caçador (355 metres [1,165 ft], Pico Forcado (364 metres [1,194 ft]) and the lower Mesa Cágado (297 metres [974 ft]). The rock formation consists of phonolitic deposits over the basaltic Fundo de Figueiras Formation.

== See also ==
- List of mountains in Cape Verde
