= Limonium braunii =

Conservation status
- Endangered (IUCN 3.1)

Scientific classification
- Kingdom: Plantae
- Clade: Tracheophytes
- Clade: Angiosperms
- Clade: Eudicots
- Order: Caryophyllales
- Family: Plumbaginaceae
- Genus: Limonium
- Species: L. braunii

Binomial name
- Limonium braunii (Bolle) A.Chev, 1935

Species of flowering plant

Limonium braunii is a species of flowering plants of the family Plumbaginaceae. The species is endemic to Cape Verde. It is listed as an endangered plant by the IUCN. The species was first described by the German Carl August Bolle as Statice braunii and was placed in the genus Limonium by the French Auguste Chevalier in 1935. Its local name is carqueja, a name that may also refer to the related species Limonium brunneri and Limonium jovibarba.

== Distribution and ecology ==
Limonium braunii is mainly found in northern rocky and stony shores of the islands of Santo Antão, São Nicolau, Fogo and Brava.

== Other ==
Limonium braunii was depicted on a 20 Cape Verdean escudo coin issued in 1994.
