= Caixa (São Vicente) =

Mountain in Cape Verde

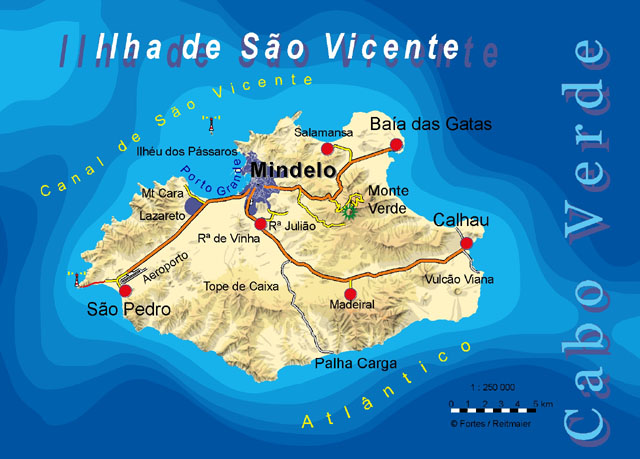
- Tope de Caixa in the island of São Vicente

Highest point
- Elevation: 535 m (1,755 ft)
- Coordinates: 16°49′29″N 24°59′48″W

Geography
- Location within Cape Verde
- Location: southern São Vicente island, Cape Verde

Caixa is a mountain in the southern part of the island of São Vicente.It is situated 7 km south of the city centre of Mindelo. Its elevation is 535 metres (1,755 ft).

== See also ==
- List of mountains in Cape Verde
