= Monte Batalha =

Mountain in Cape Verde

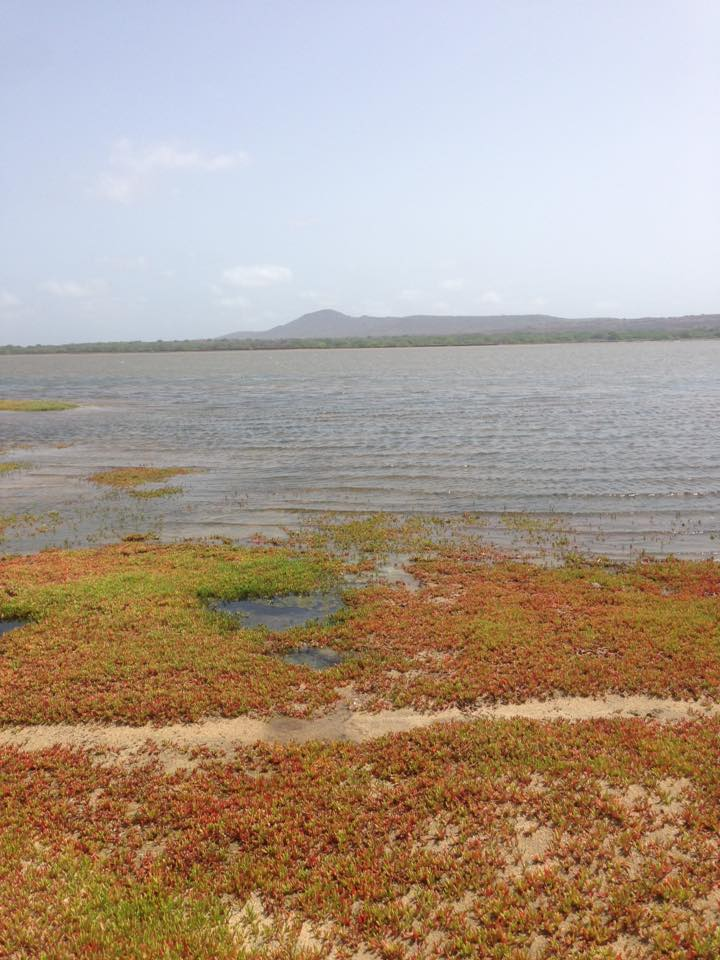
- Monte Batalha as seen from the Maio Saltpans of the southwest

Highest point
- Elevation: 294 m (965 ft)
- Listing: List of mountains in Cape Verde
- Coordinates: 15°12′04″N 23°11′12″W

Geography
- Location within Cape Verde
- Location: island of Maio, Cape Verde

Monte Batalha is a mountain in the island of Maio in Cape Verde. Its elevation is 294 m. It is situated 4 km southeast of Calheta and 8 km northeast of the island capital Porto Inglês.

== See also ==
- List of mountains in Cape Verde
