= Monte António Gomes =

Mountain in Cape Verde

- Location within Cape Verde

Highest point
- Elevation: 362 m (1,188 ft)
- Listing: List of mountains in Cape Verde
- Coordinates: 16°53′07″N 24°55′56″W

Geography
- Location: northeastern São Vicente

Monte António Gomes is a mountain in the northeastern part of the island of São Vicente, Cape Verde. Its elevation is 362 meters. It is 1.6 km north of Monte Verde, 2.3 km southeast of the village Salamansa and 6 km east of the city centre of Mindelo.

== See also ==
- List of mountains in Cape Verde
