= Monte São João =

Mountain in Cape Verde

- Location within Cape Verde

Highest point
- Elevation: 154 m (505 ft)
- Coordinates: 16°51′45″N 24°59′47″W

Geography
- Location: central São Vicente island, Cape Verde

Monte São João is a low mountain in the central part of the island of São Vicente, Cape Verde. Its elevation is 154 m. It is situated 3 km southwest of the city centre of Mindelo.

== See also ==
- List of mountains in Cape Verde
