= Limonium brunneri =

Conservation status
- Critically Endangered (IUCN 3.1)

Scientific classification
- Kingdom: Plantae
- Clade: Embryophytes
- Clade: Tracheophytes
- Clade: Angiosperms
- Clade: Eudicots
- Order: Caryophyllales
- Family: Plumbaginaceae
- Genus: Limonium
- Species: L. brunneri

Binomial name
- Limonium brunneri (Webb ex Boiss.) Kunze

Species of flowering plant

Limonium brunneri is a species of flowering plant of the family Plumbaginaceae. The species is endemic to Cape Verde. It is listed as critically endangered by the IUCN. The species was named by Carl Ernst Otto Kunze in 1891. Its local name is carqueja, a name that may also refer to the related species Limonium braunii and Limonium jovibarba.

== Distribution and ecology ==
Limonium brunneri grows in sandy and clayey areas, and is found on the arid coasts of the islands of Sal and São Vicente and the islets of Branco and Raso.
