= Morro Negro =

- Location within Cape Verde

Highest point
- Elevation: 156 m (512 ft)
- Listing: List of mountains in Cape Verde
- Coordinates: 16°6′13″N 22°40′41″W

Morro Negro is a hill located near the east coast of the island of Boa Vista, Cape Verde. Its elevation is 156 m. The nearest village is Cabeça dos Tarrafes, 5.5 km to the northwest.

== Turtle Nature Reserve ==
The hill forms a part of the Turtle Nature Reserve (Portuguese: Reserva Natural Tartaruga), which covers 14.39 km^{2} of land area and 134.36 km^{2} of marine area. The reserve protects the beaches as nesting areas for its turtle population, and its wetlands and salty lands for birds.

== Lighthouse ==
Morro Negro Lighthouse
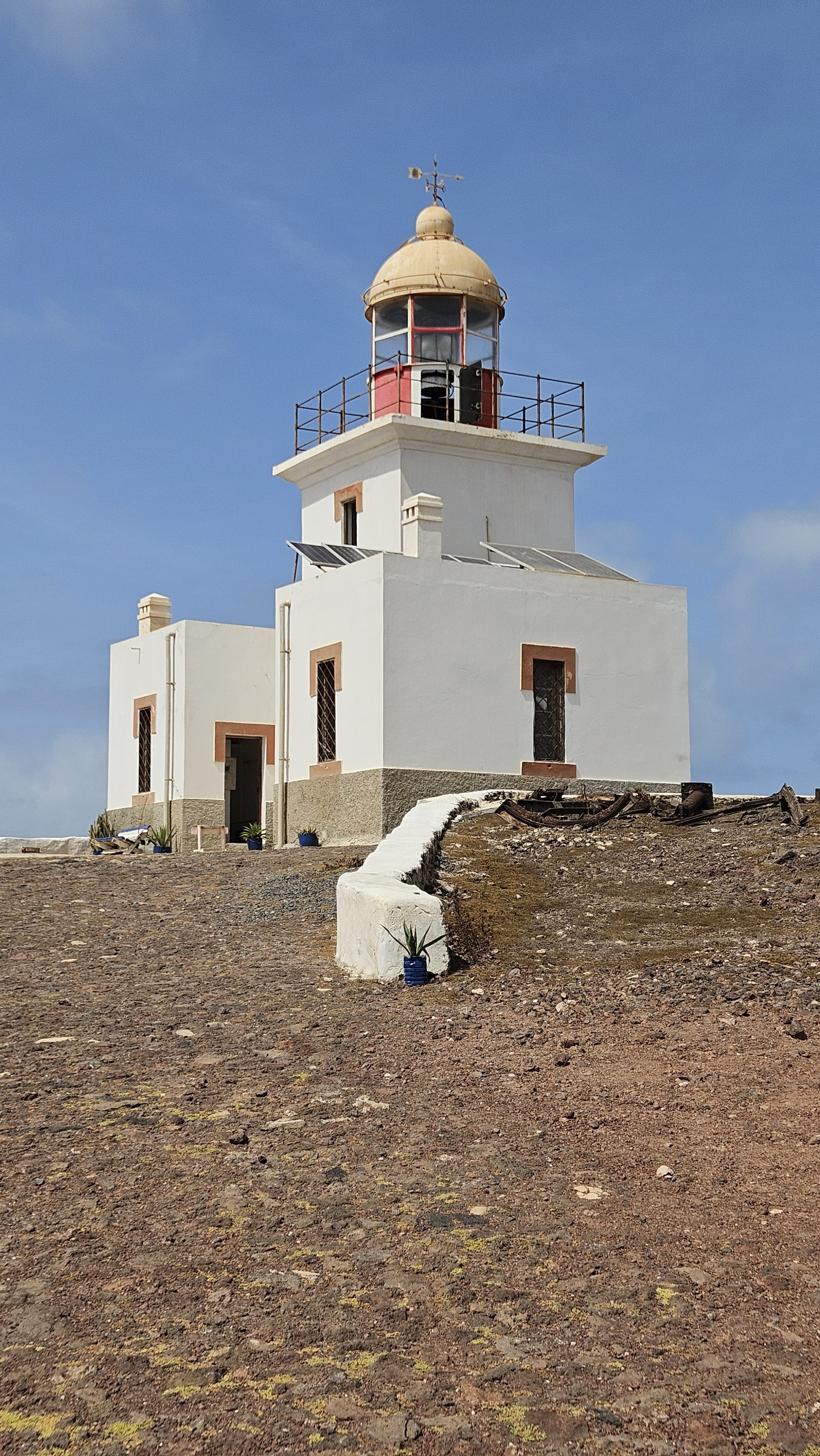
- Location: Morro Negro; Boa Vista; Cape Verde
- Coordinates: 16°6′8.8″N 22°40′39.0″W

Tower
- Constructed: ~1930
- Foundation: concrete base
- Construction: concrete tower
- Height: 11.9 metres (39 ft)
- Shape: quadrangular tower with balcony and lantern attached to 1-storey keeper’s house
- Markings: white tower, red lantern
- Power source: solar power

Light
- Focal height: 163 metres (535 ft)
- Range: 31 nautical miles (57 km; 36 mi)
- Characteristic: Fl W 20s.
- Cape Verde no.: PT-2102

There is a lighthouse on the hill. The lighthouse was built around 1930. It is 12 meters tall and its focal height is 163 meters. Its light range is 31 nautical miles (57 km; 36 mi).

== See also ==
- List of lighthouses in Cape Verde
- List of mountains in Cape Verde
