= Pico de Alberto =

Mountain in Cape Verde

- Location within Cape Verde

Highest point
- Elevation: 598 m (1,962 ft)
- Listing: List of mountains in Cape Verde
- Coordinates: 16°35′15″N 24°7′15″W

Geography
- Location: eastern São Nicolau Island, Cape Verde

Climbing
- Easiest route: climb

Pico de Alberto is a mountain in the eastern part of São Nicolau island in Cape Verde. Its elevation is 598 m. The mountain's summit is located south of the village Juncalinho.
