= Ponta do Sol (Boa Vista) =

Northernmost point of Boa Vista island, Cape Verde

- Headland
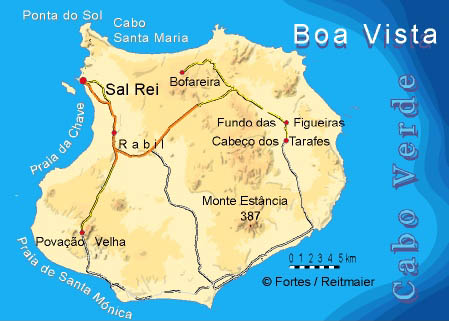
- Ponta do Sol, its location is in the northwest of the island

- Location within Cape Verde
- Coordinates: 16°13′51″N 22°54′35″W
- Location: Northwestern Boa Vista, Cape Verde
- Water bodies: Atlantic Ocean

Ponta do Sol is a headland located in the northwest of the island of Boa Vista. Cape Verde. It is the island's northernmost point. The town Sal Rei is approximately 6 km (3.7 mi) to the south, and the hill Vigia is 2 km (1.2 mi) to the south.

The promontory and the area around it is designated a protected area as a nature reserve with a total of 465 hectares (1,150 acres). It includes a marine strip 300 meters (980 ft) from the coast, covering 283 hectares (700 acres).

The nature reserve protects emblematic birds including ospreys, and a volcanic landscape with fossil dunes. There is a lighthouse on the cape, with a focal height of 117 m (384 ft).
