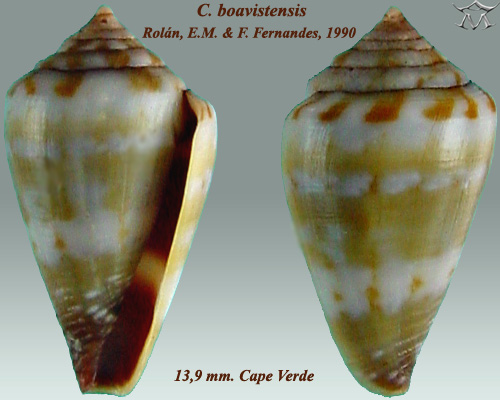
- Apertural and abapertural views of shell of Conus boavistensis Rolán & Fernandez in Rolán, 1990
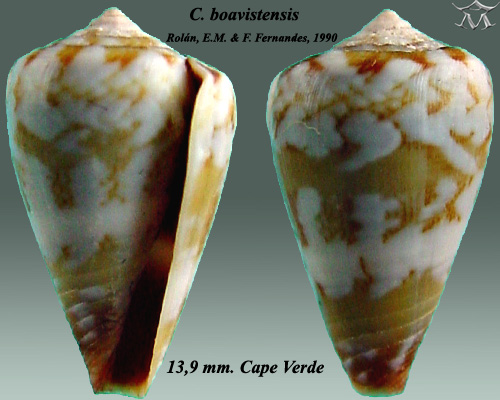

Conservation status
- Least Concern (IUCN 3.1)

Scientific classification
- Kingdom: Animalia
- Phylum: Mollusca
- Class: Gastropoda
- Subclass: Caenogastropoda
- Order: Neogastropoda
- Superfamily: Conoidea
- Family: Conidae
- Genus: Conus
- Species: C. boavistensis

Binomial name
- Conus boavistensis Rolán & Fernandez in Rolán, 1990

Synonyms
- Africonus barrosensis Cossignani & Fiadeiro, 2017; Africonus boavistensis (Rolán & Fernandes, 1990); Africonus varandinhensis Cossignani & Fiadeiro, 2017 (original combination); Conus (Lautoconus) boavistensis Rolán & Fernandez in Rolán, 1990 · accepted, alternate representation

= Conus boavistensis =

Species of sea snail

Conus boavistensis is a species of sea snail, a marine gastropod mollusk in the family Conidae, the cone snails and their allies.

Like all species within the genus Conus, these snails are predatory and venomous. They are capable of stinging humans, therefore live ones should be handled carefully or not at all.

== Description ==
The size of an adult shell grows to a length of 13 mm to 20 mm.

== Distribution ==
This species can be found in the Atlantic Ocean off the island of Boa Vista, Cape Verde.
