= Monte Bissau =

Mountain in Cape Verde

- Location within Cape Verde

Highest point
- Elevation: 615 m (2,018 ft)
- Coordinates: 16°36′38″N 24°14′40″W

Geography
- Location: central São Nicolau island, Cape Verde

Monte Bissau is a mountain in the central part of the island of São Nicolau in Cape Verde. It is situated 3 km southwest of Belém and 6 km east of the island capital Ribeira Brava. Its elevation is 615 m.

== See also ==
- List of mountains in Cape Verde
