= Monte Grande (Sal) =

Mountain in Cape Verde

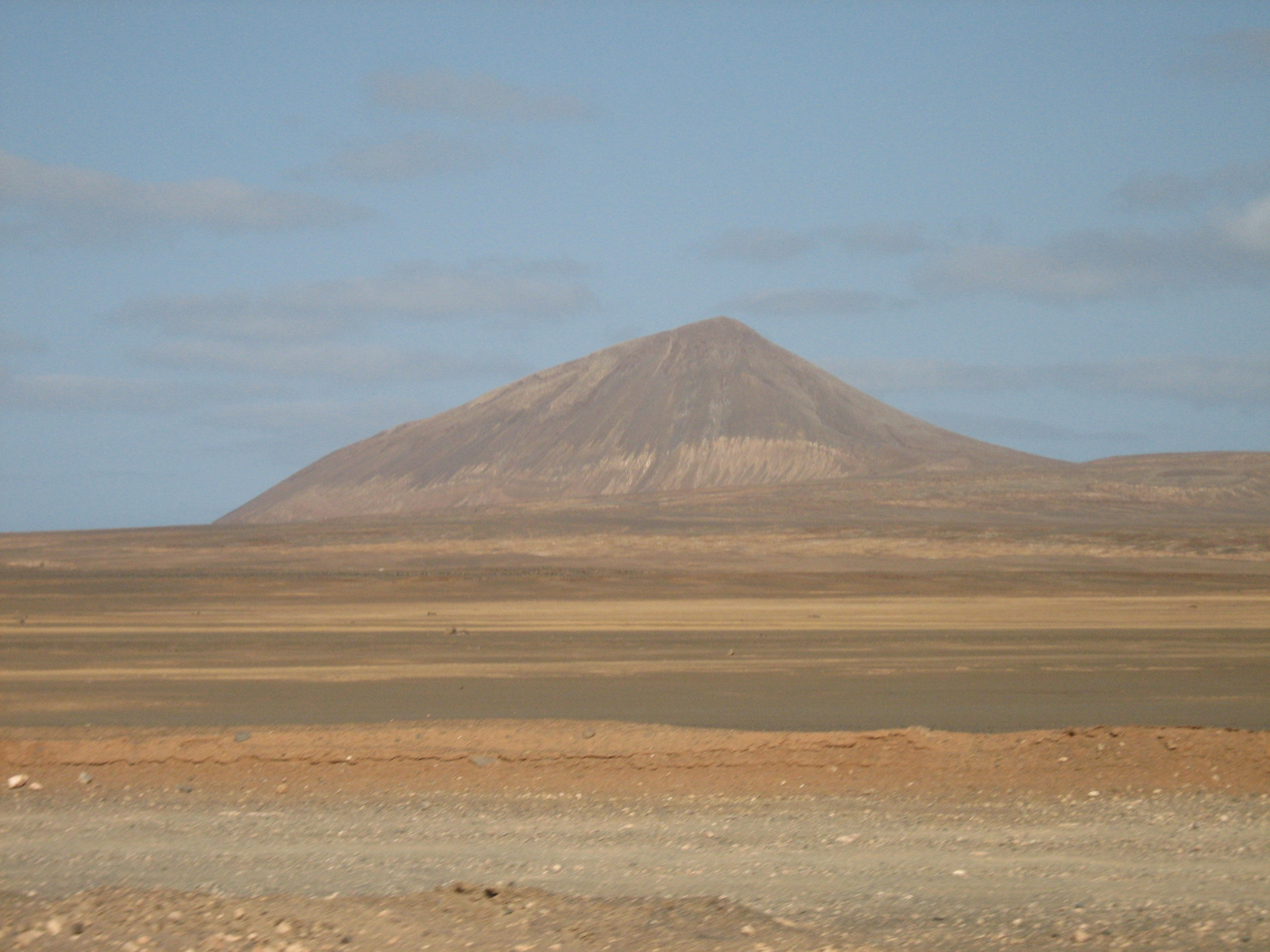
- Monte Grande

Highest point
- Elevation: 406 m (1,332 ft)
- Prominence: 406 m (1,332 ft)
- Listing: List of mountains in Cape Verde
- Coordinates: 16°49′15″N 22°54′36″W

Geography
- Location within Cape Verde
- Location: northern Sal

Monte Grande (Portuguese meaning “big mountain”) is a mountain in the northern part of the island of Sal in Cape Verde. It is situated 8 km northeast of the island capital Espargos. At 405 m (1,329 ft) elevation, it is the highest point of the island. It is a protected landscape because of its geological value; the protected area covers 1,309 ha (3,230 acres). There are pillow lava formations on the coast.

== See also ==
- List of mountains in Cape Verde
- List of protected areas in Cape Verde
