= Monte Montona =

Low mountain in western São Vicente, Cape Verde

- Location within Cape Verde

Highest point
- Elevation: 242 m (794 ft)
- Coordinates: 16°50′22″N 25°01′38″W

Geography
- Location: western São Vicente island, Cape Verde

Monte Montona is a low mountain in the western part of the island of São Vicente, Cape Verde. Its elevation is 242 m. It is situated 4 km northeast of São Pedro and 6 km southwest of the island capital Mindelo.
