= Rocha Estância =

Mountain in Cape Verde

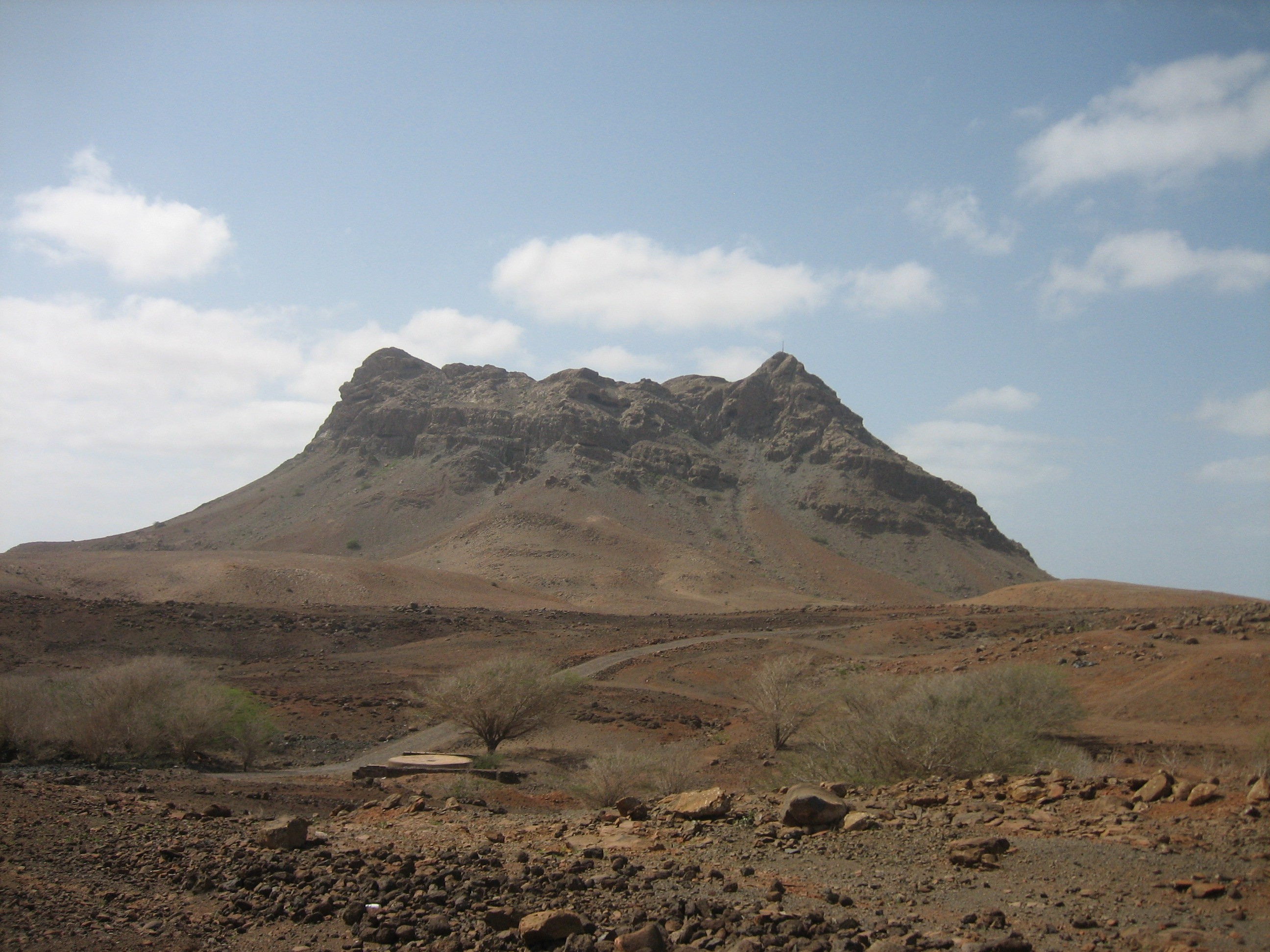
- Rocha Estância

Highest point
- Elevation: 357 m (1,171 ft)
- Listing: List of mountains in Cape Verde
- Coordinates: 16°02′38″N 22°54′43″W

Geography
- Location within Cape Verde
- Location: Southeastern Boa Vista Island, Cape Verde

Rocha Estância is a mountain in the southwestern part of the island Boa Vista in Cape Verde, east of the village of Povoação Velha. Its elevation is 357 meters. It is part of a protected area (category Natural Monument) covering 253 ha. The Our Lady of Conception church is located at the western foot of the mountain.

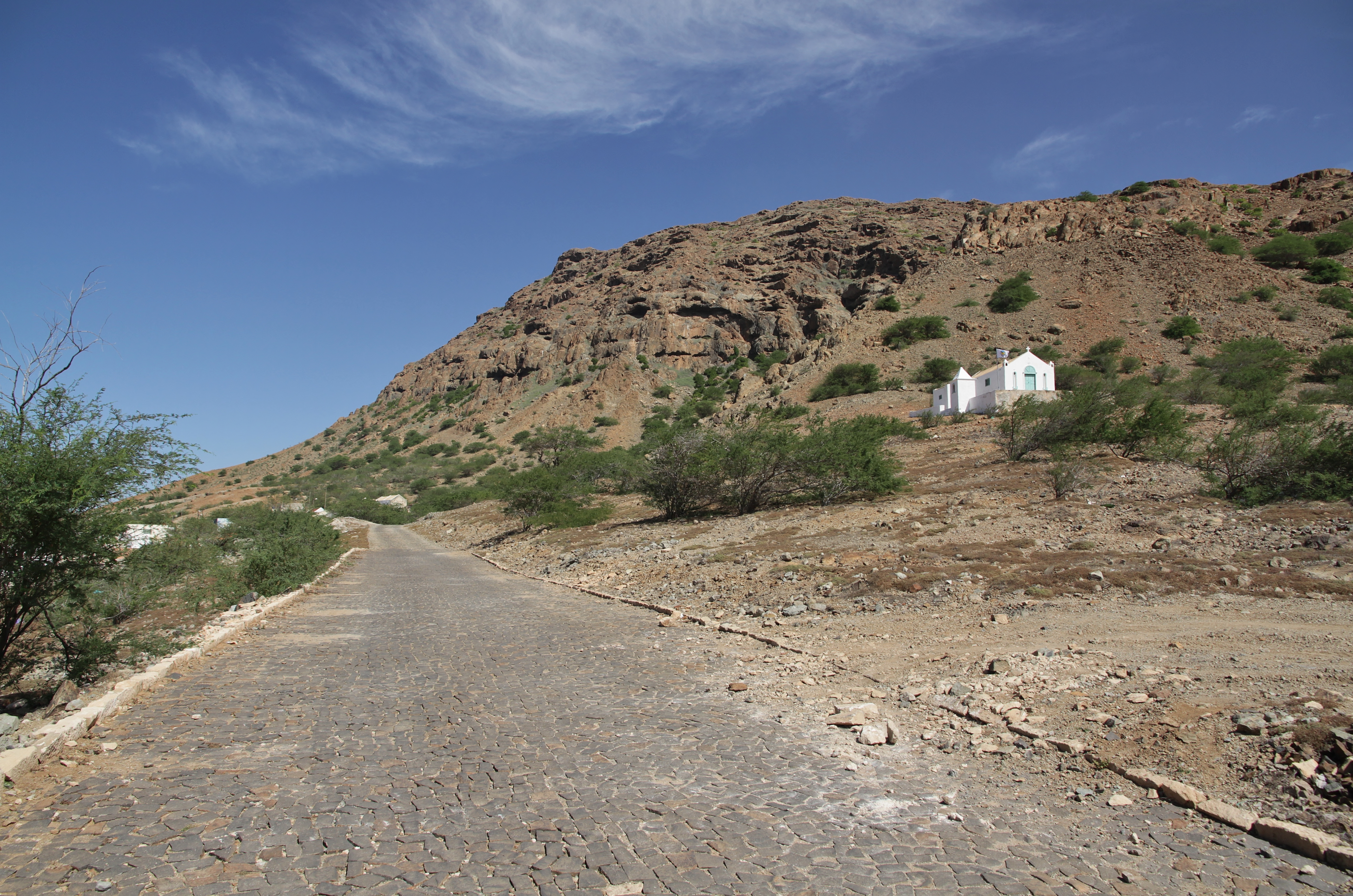
The western foot of the mountain with the church named Our Lady of Conception near Povoação Velha

== See also ==
- List of mountains in Cape Verde
