= Vigia (mountain) =

Mountain in Cape Verde

- Location within Cape Verde

Highest point
- Elevation: 146 m (479 ft)
- Coordinates: 16°12′44″N 22°54′45″W

Geography
- Location: northwestern Boa Vista island, Cape Verde

Vigia is a low mountain in the northwestern part of the island of Boa Vista, Cape Verde. Its elevation is 146 m. It is situated 4 km north of the island capital Sal Rei, and 2 km south of the headland Ponta do Sol. It is part of the Ponta do Sol Nature Reserve covering 467 hectares of land and sea.

== See also ==
- List of mountains in Cape Verde
