= Praia de Atalanta =

Beach in Cape Verde

- Beach
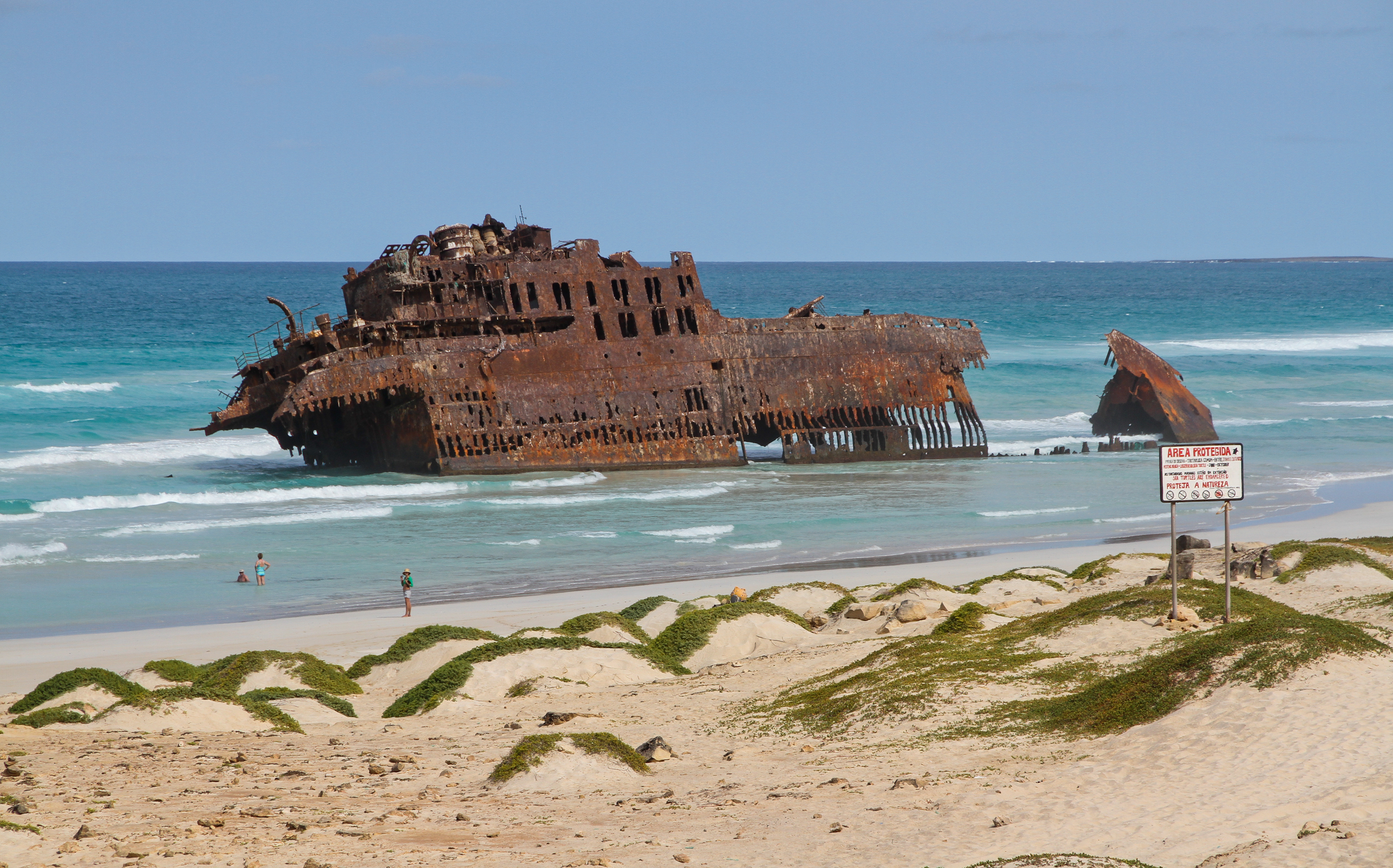
- The wreck of M/S Cabo Santa Maria at the beach in Praia de Atalanta in December 2010.

- Location within Cape Verde
- Coordinates: 16.202°N 22.865°W
- Location: Northwestern Boa Vista

Dimensions
  - Length: 10 km (6.2 mi)
- Access: road

Praia de Atalanta is a beach on the north coast of the island of Boa Vista in Cape Verde. It is approximately 6 km northeast of the island capital of Sal Rei and 3 km west of Vigía. The wreck of the Spanish cargo ship Cabo Santa Maria, which ran aground on September 1, 1968, is located here.

The beach forms a part of Boa Esperança Nature Reserve which also includes the beaches of Sobrado and Copinha.
