= Fateixa =

Uninhabited mountain valley in Cape Verde

- Location within Cape Verde

Geography
- Location: western São Vicente north of São Pedro
- Coordinates: 16°51′47″N 25°03′07″W
- Rivers: Ribeira da Fateixa
- Interactive map of Fateixa

Fateixa is an uninhabited mountain valley near the west coast of the island of São Vicente in Cape Verde. It is 7 km west from the city of Mindelo and 4 km north of São Pedro. It is accessed by the mountain pass Selada de Fateixa. It is surrounded by 300–400 m high mountains, including Cabeça de Gato and Monte de Carrachiça.
