= Monte Verde (Cape Verde) =

Mountain in Cape Verde

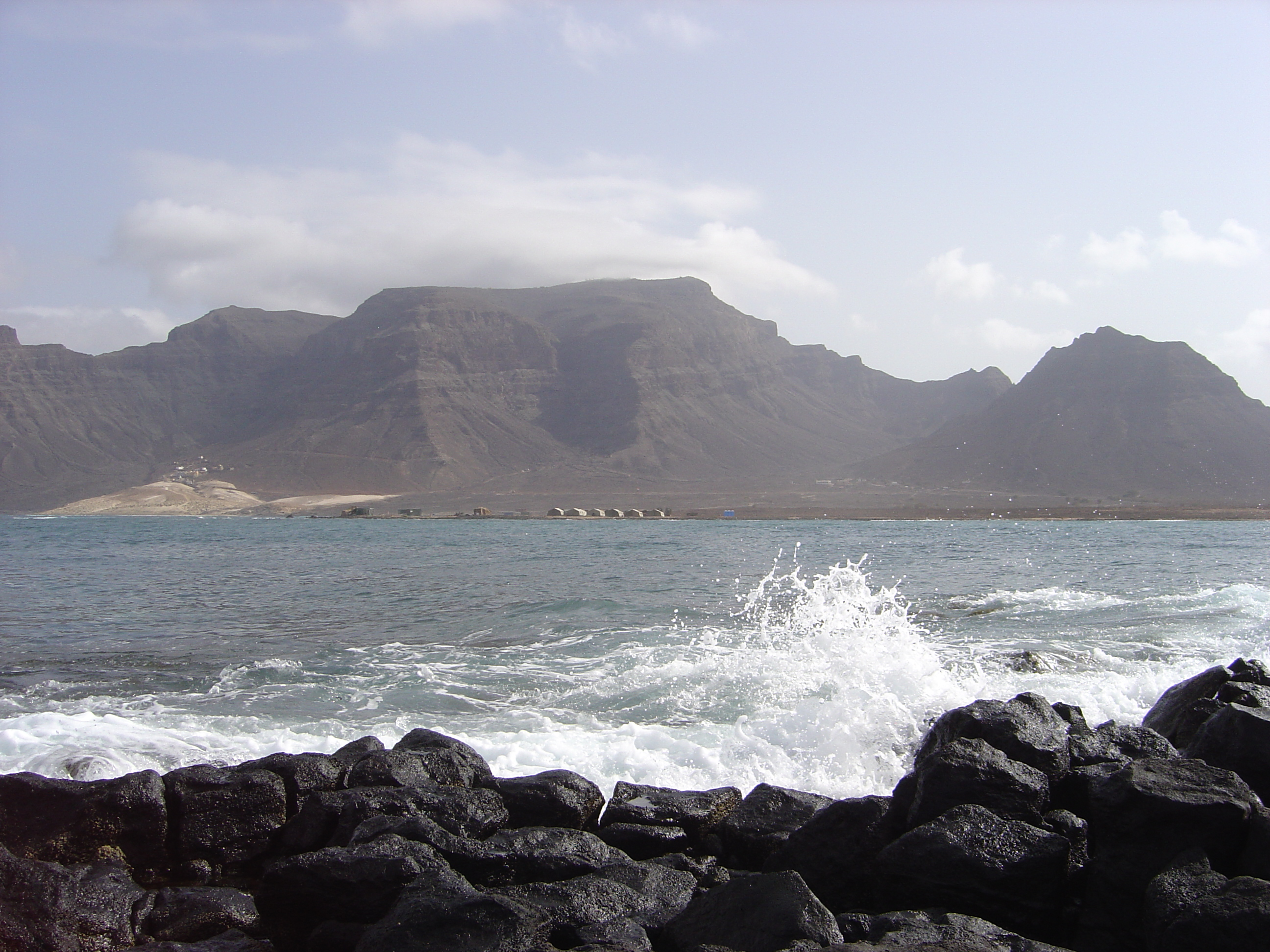
- Monte Verde seen from Baía das Gatas

Highest point
- Elevation: 744 m (2,441 ft)
- Prominence: 744 m (2,441 ft)
- Listing: List of mountains in Cape Verde
- Coordinates: 16°52′07″N 24°56′05″W

Geography
- Location within Cape Verde
- Location: eastern São Vicente

Geology
- Mountain type: Stratovolcano

Monte Verde (Portuguese meaning "green mountain") is a mountain in the eastern part of the island of São Vicente, Cape Verde. At 744 m elevation, it is the island's highest point. The mountain is located 6 km (4 mi) east of the city centre of Mindelo.

== Natural Park ==
The mountain is part of the Natural Park Monte Verde, covering 3.12 km^{2} (1.20 sq mi). Due to its elevation, it is less arid than the rest of the island. All species and communities of endemic flora of São Vicente are concentrated in this area. Of the 93 inventoried species of flora, 17 are on the list of endangered species of São Vicente. In the inaccessible parts of Monte Verde there is a typical vegetation consisting of Limonium jovibarba, Sonchus daltonii, Lobularia canariensis subsp. fruticosa and Campylanthus glaber subsp. spathulatus.

== See also ==
- List of protected areas in Cape Verde
