= Monte Estância =

Mountain in Boa Vista, Cape Verde

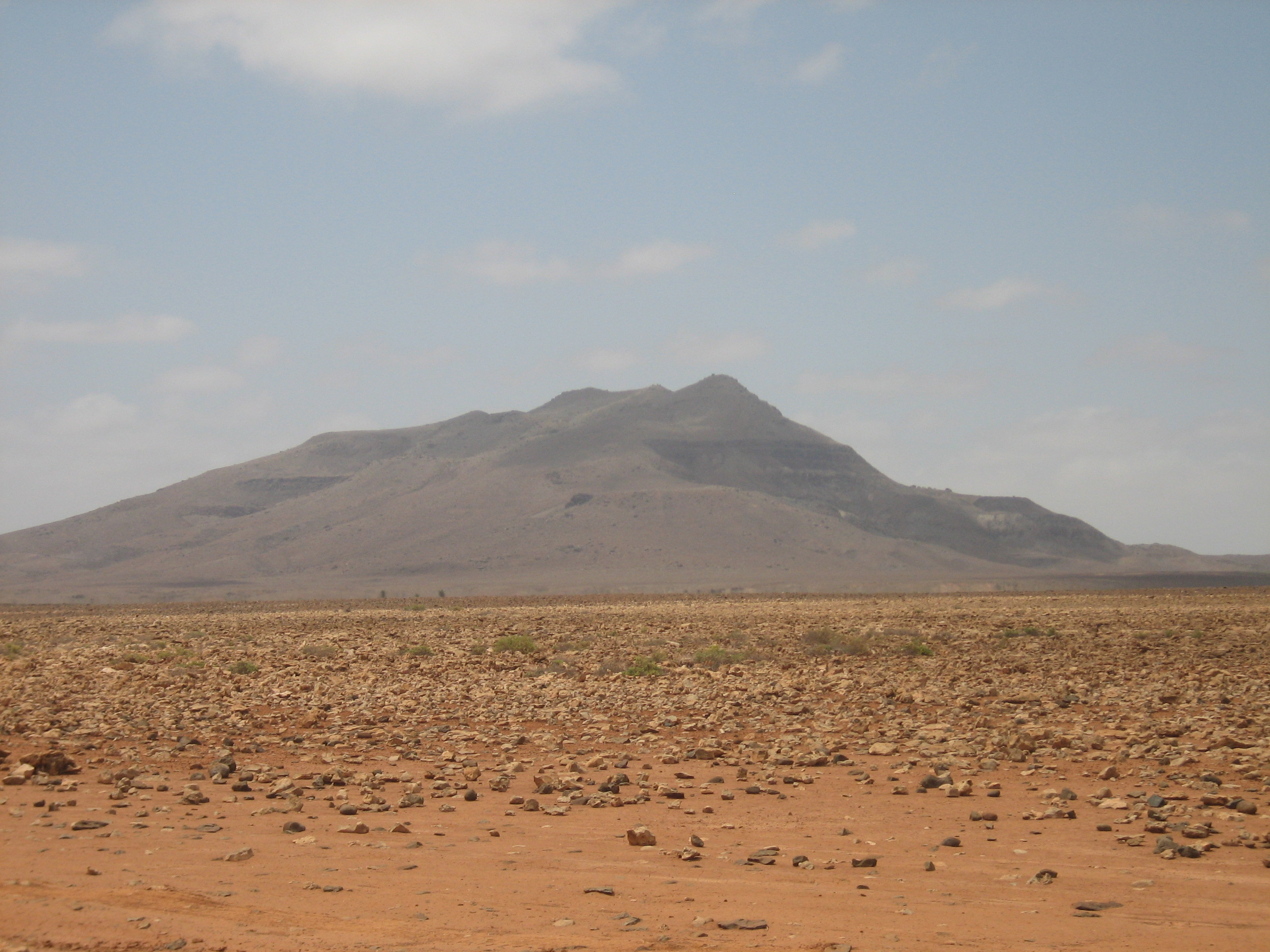
- Monte Estância

Highest point
- Elevation: 387 m (1,270 ft)
- Prominence: 387 m (1,270 ft)
- Listing: List of mountains in Cape Verde
- Coordinates: 16°02′48″N 22°45′18″W

Geography
- Location within Cape Verde
- Location: southeastern Boa Vista

Monte Estância is a mountain in the southeastern part of the island Boa Vista in Cape Verde. At 387 m elevation, it is the island's highest point. It is located 4 km from the Atlantic coast and 23 km southeast of the island capital Sal Rei. It is part of a protected natural space under the statute of natural monument, which covers 739 ha.

== See also ==
- List of mountains in Cape Verde
