= Boa Vista, Cape Verde =

Cape Verde island

Boa Vista
Nickname: Ilha das dunas (island of the dunes)
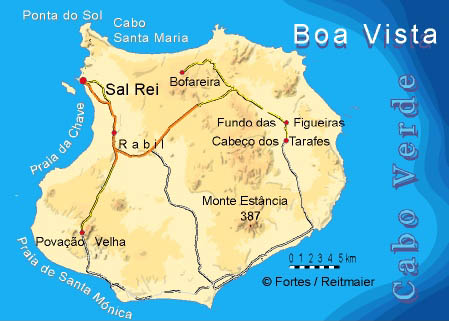

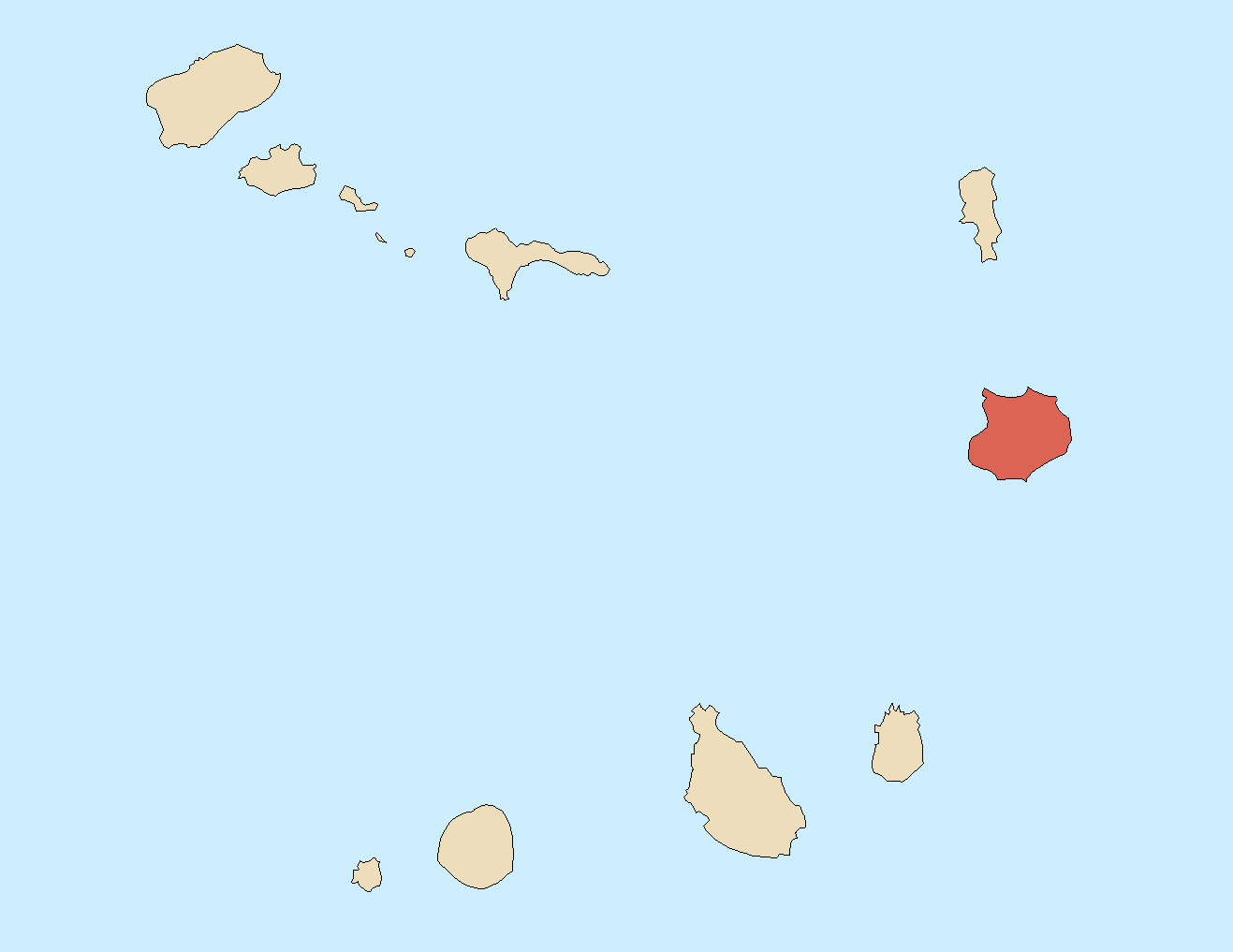

- Location within Cape Verde Location within Africa

Geography
- Location: Atlantic Ocean
- Coordinates: 16°6′N 22°48′W
- Archipelago: Cape Verde
- Area: 631.1 km^{2} (243.7 sq mi)
- Length: 30.8 km (19.14 mi)
- Width: 28.9 km (17.96 mi)
- Highest elevation: 387 m (1270 ft)
- Highest point: Monte Estância

Administration
- Cape Verde
- Municipality: Boa Vista
- Largest settlement: Sal Rei

Demographics
- Population: 14,451 (2015)
- Pop. density: 22.9/km^{2} (59.3/sq mi)

Additional information
- Official website: www.municipiodaboavista.com

Boa Vista (Portuguese for "good view"), sometimes spelled Boavista, is a desert-like island that belongs to the Cape Verde Islands. At 631 km^{2} (244 sq mi), it is the third largest island of the Cape Verde archipelago.

The island of Boa Vista is closer to the African continent than all the other islands in Cape Verde, being the easternmost island of all. The distance between Boa Vista and Senegal is only 450 km. The capital of Boa Vista, Sal Rei, is located in the north-western part of the island. Boa Vista is mainly known for its beaches, turtles and traditional music.

== Geography ==
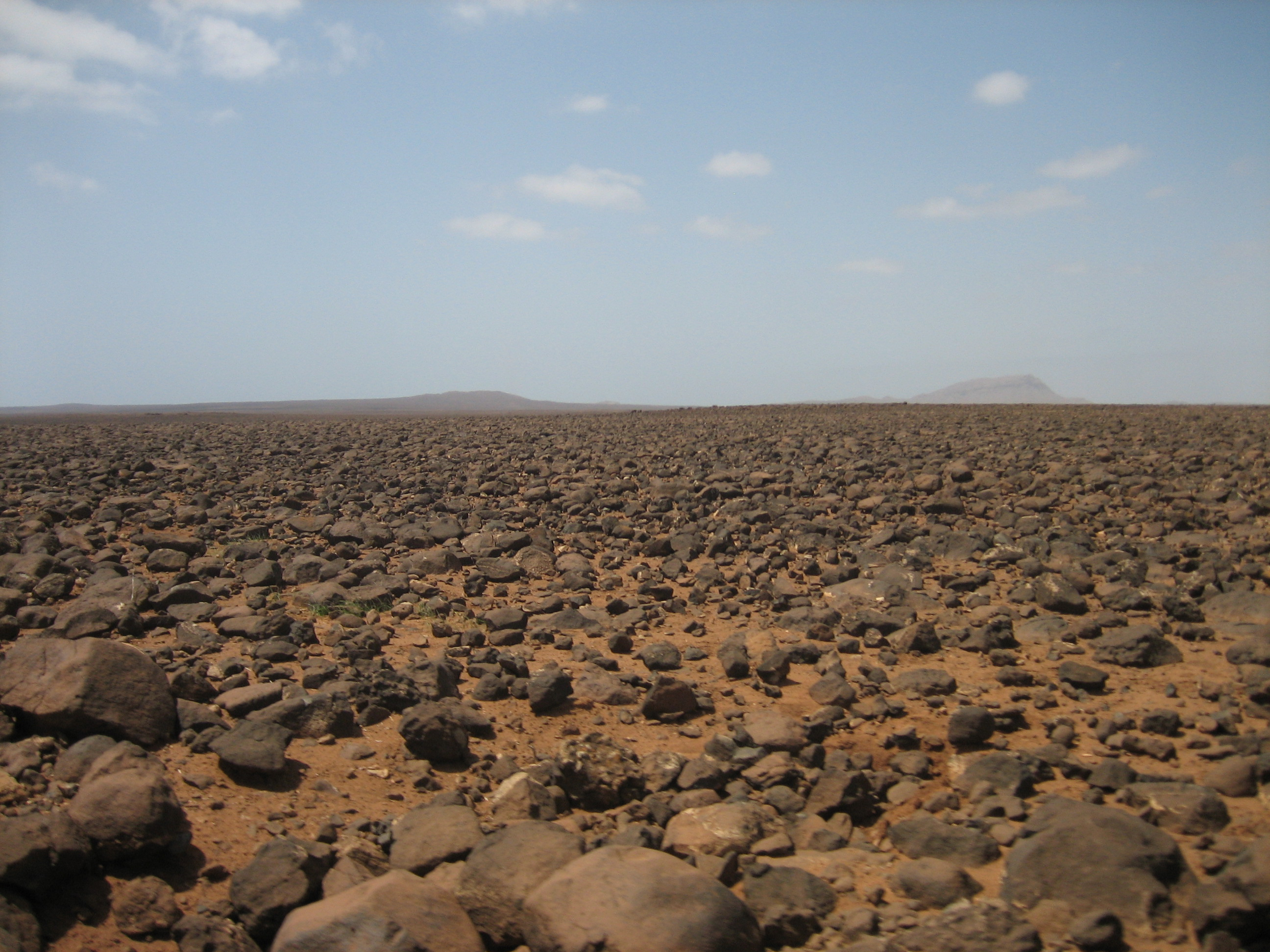
Hamada landscape in the centre of Boa Vista

Boa Vista is the third largest island after Santo Antão and Santiago, with an area of 631.1 square kilometres. It is situated south of Sal and north of Maio. The island is generally flat, but it has numerous hills like Monte Estância (the highest point of the island at 387 m), Monte Santo António, Rocha Estância, Morro de Areia, Morro Negro, Monte Caçador, Pico Forcado and Monte Vigia.

Boa Vista is famous for its large beaches like Atalanta, Cabral, Chaves, Ervatão, Gatas, Santa Mónica and Varandinha. Its northernmost point is Ponta do Sol; its westernmost point Ponta Varandinha. Its main river is the Ribeira do Rabil, which has the largest basin area of all Cape Verde at 199 km^{2} (77 sq mi). Boa Vista is also notable for its desert Deserto de Viana and its dune fields. Boa Vista is surrounded by a number of uninhabited islets, the largest of which is Ilhéu de Sal Rei.

== History ==
The uninhabited island Boa Vista was discovered by António de Noli and Diogo Gomes in 1460. Until the end of the 16th century the only human activity on the island was breeding wild cattle. The island's first settlement, now known as Povoação Velha, was established in 1620 for its salt deposits, which were mainly exploited by the English. In 1820, after many pirate attacks, the population moved to Porto Inglês, later renamed Sal Rei, which had been founded at the end of the 18th century. As did much of the Cape Verdean economy, the exploitation of salt on Boa Vista also relied largely on slavery. A Portuguese-British commission to end slavery was established in Boa Vista in 1842, but slavery was not completely abolished until 1876. Until 1935 the municipality of Boa Vista also covered the island of Sal. In 1975, Cape Verde declared its independence.

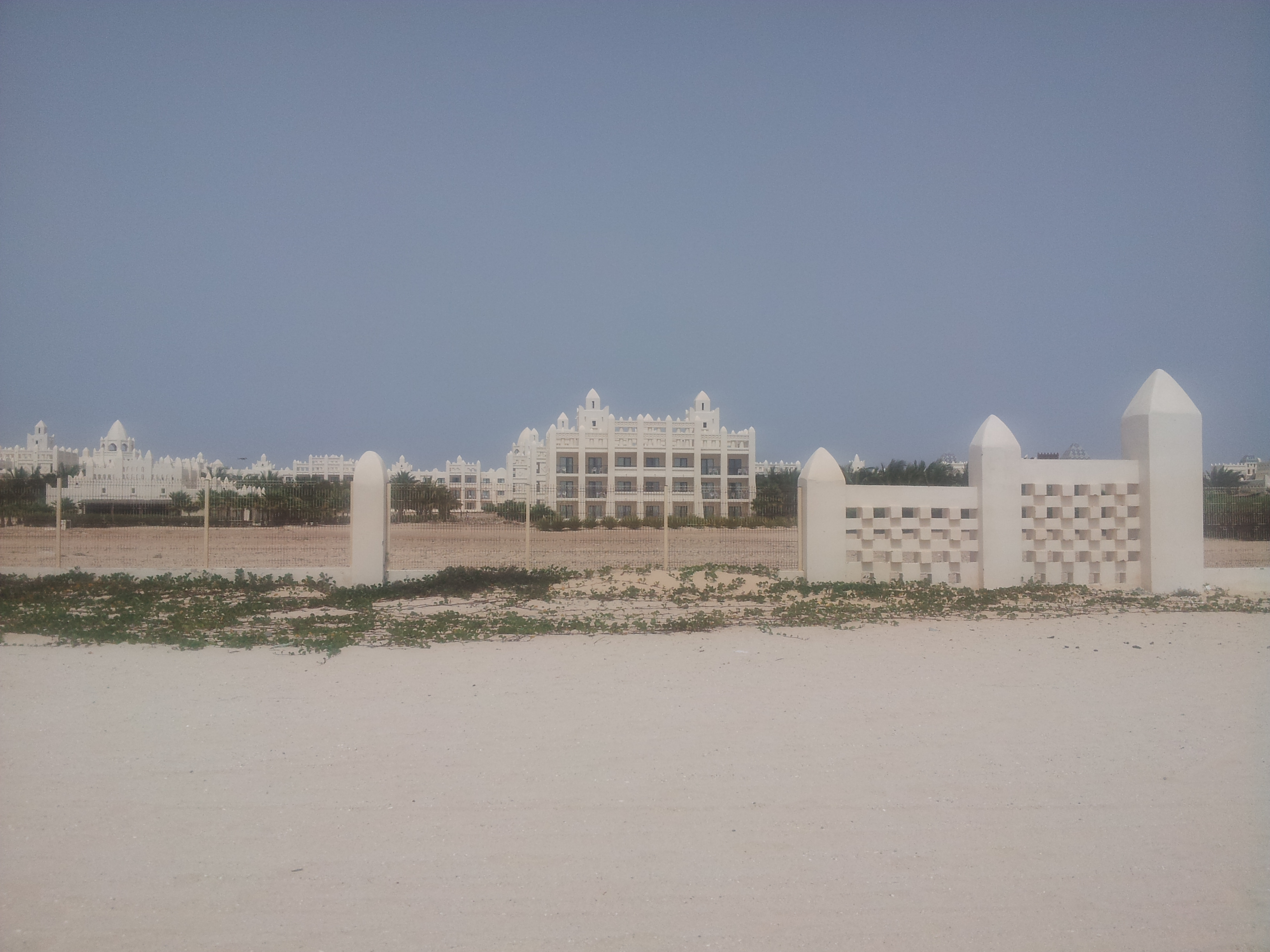
Karamboa Hotel in the west of Rabil

== Municipality ==
Administratively, the island of Boa Vista is covered by one municipality, Concelho da Boa Vista. This municipality consists of two freguesias (civil parishes): Santa Isabel and São João Baptista. The municipal seat is the city Sal Rei. The island's two parishes are subdivided into 9 population zones for statistical purposes:

Municipality	Concelho da Boa Vista		
Freguesias	Santa Isabel		São João Baptista
Zones	Bofarreira; Estância de Baixo; Lacacão	Povoação Velha; Rabil (town); Sal Rei (city)	Cabeça dos Tarrafes; Fundo das Figueiras; João Galego

=== Politics ===
Since 2016, the local party BASTA is the ruling party of the municipality. The results of the latest elections, in 2016:

Party	Municipal Council		Municipal Assembly	
Party	Votes%	Seats	Votes%	Seats
BASTA	57.56	5	53.08	7
MpD	30.60	0	30.23	4
PAICV	10.32	0	14.96	2

== Population ==
In the 1830s, the population of Boa Vista was estimated at 4,000. In 2015 Boa Vista's population was 14,451. Most of the population live in Sal Rei, but there are also several smaller settlements with 10 to 100 people. With 23.3 inhabitants per km^{2}, it is the least-dense populated island in the archipelago.

The population of Boa Vista consist of a mixture of different nationalities. The Creoles, of mixed mainland African and European descent are the biggest group of inhabitants, with no less than 70%, as a lot of Portuguese entered into a relation with the slaves of the African continent, during the colonization of Portugal, and settled in Boa Vista afterwards.

Population of Boa Vista (1940—2015)
Year	Population
1940	2,779
1950	2,985
1960	3,263
1970	3,569
1980	3,372
1990	3,452
2000	4,193
2010	8,554
2015	14,451

== Economy ==
Previously, the inhabitants of Boa Vista survived off salt collection and date farming. Now they still earn money from date farming, but also from tourism. A lot of people work in the tourism sector, as taxi drivers, employees in the various hotel chains or souvenir salesmen in Sal Rei. The income from tourism has risen rapidly since the international airport opened in 2007. There are several hotels and beach resorts on the island.

== Transport ==
The airport of Boa Vista is Aristides Pereira International Airport, about 5 km southeast of Sal Rei. There are ferry services from the port of Sal Rei.

The island has 64 km of national roads, the single first class national road connects Sal Rei and Rabil.

== Nature ==
Boa Vista is not as abundant in flora and fauna as the other larger or more humid islands such as Santiago and Santo Antão; only 3% of its area is forested. However, 37% of its area is a protected area, which is the highest proportion of all inhabited Cape Verde islands. There are 14 protected areas on Boa Vista, including beaches that are important nesting areas for loggerhead sea turtles and birds. There are several endemic species, such as Boa Vista wall gecko (Tarentola boavistensis), Conus boavistensis, Conus salreiensis, and Plesiocystiscus bubistae.

== Gallery ==
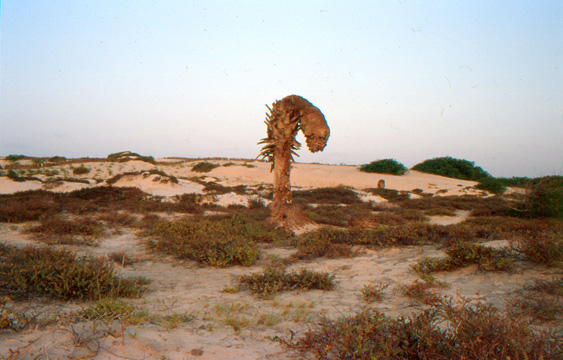
Boa Vista landscape

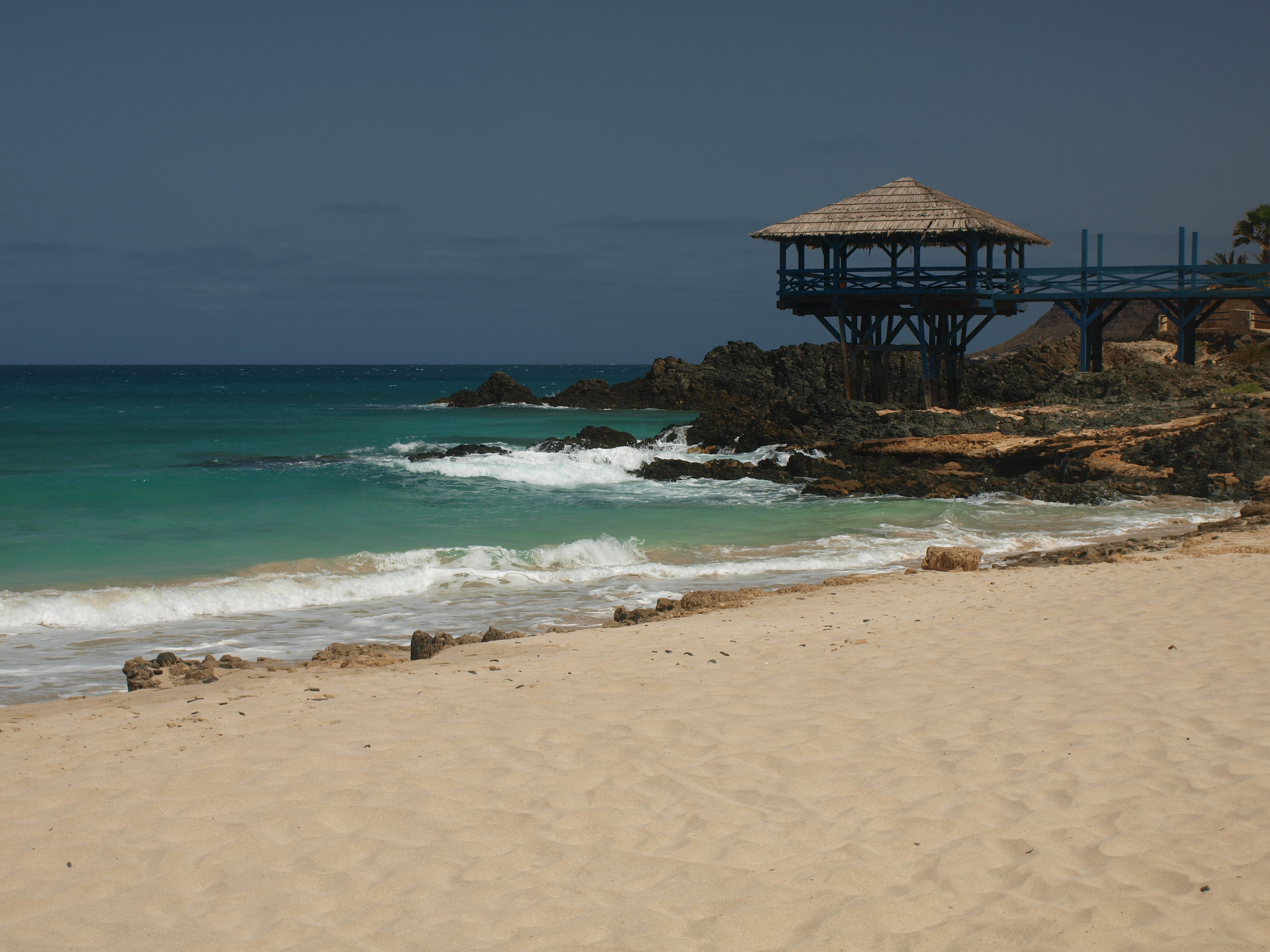
Praia de Cabral, Boa Vista, Cape Verde

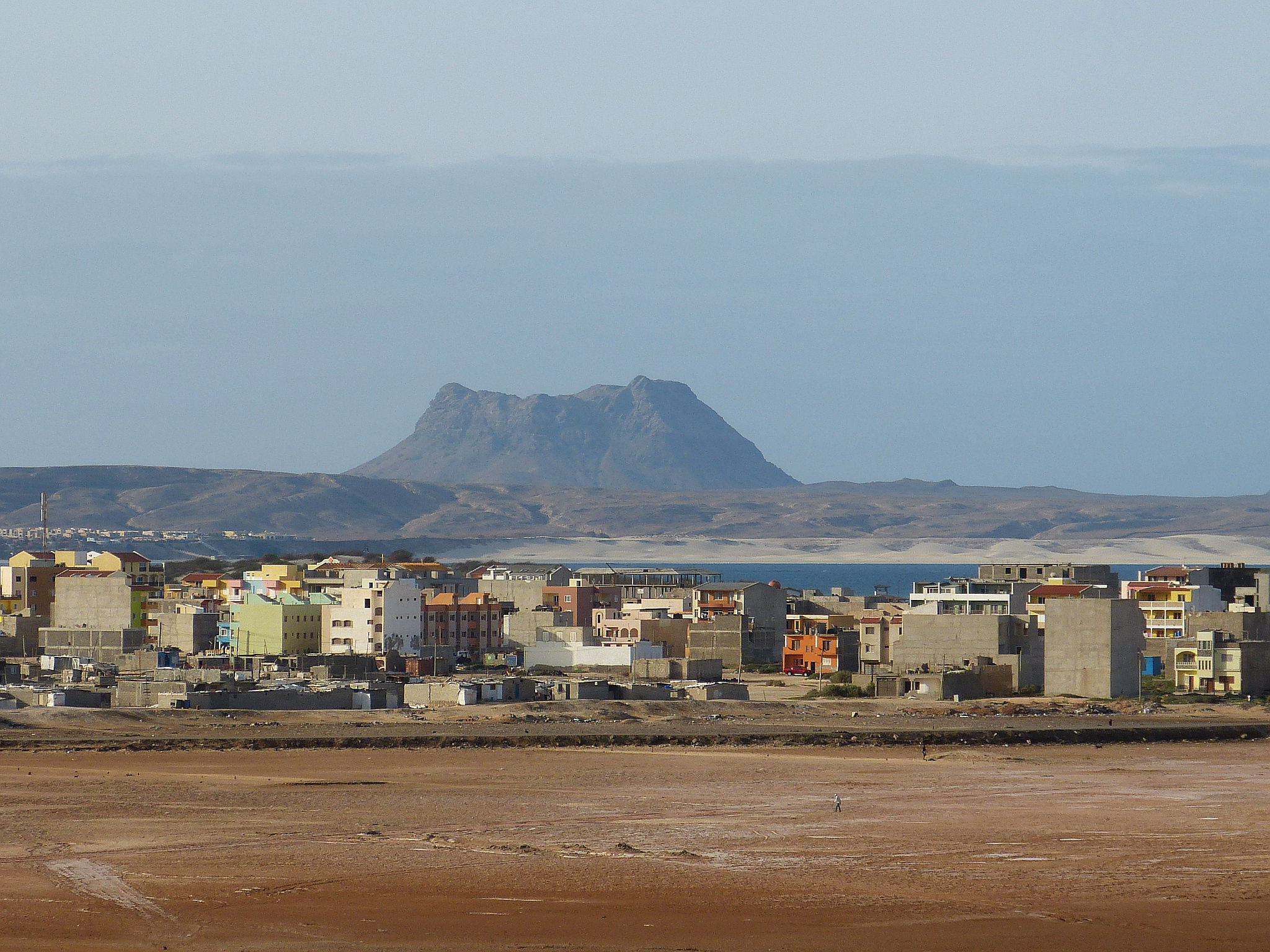
The capital, Sal Rei

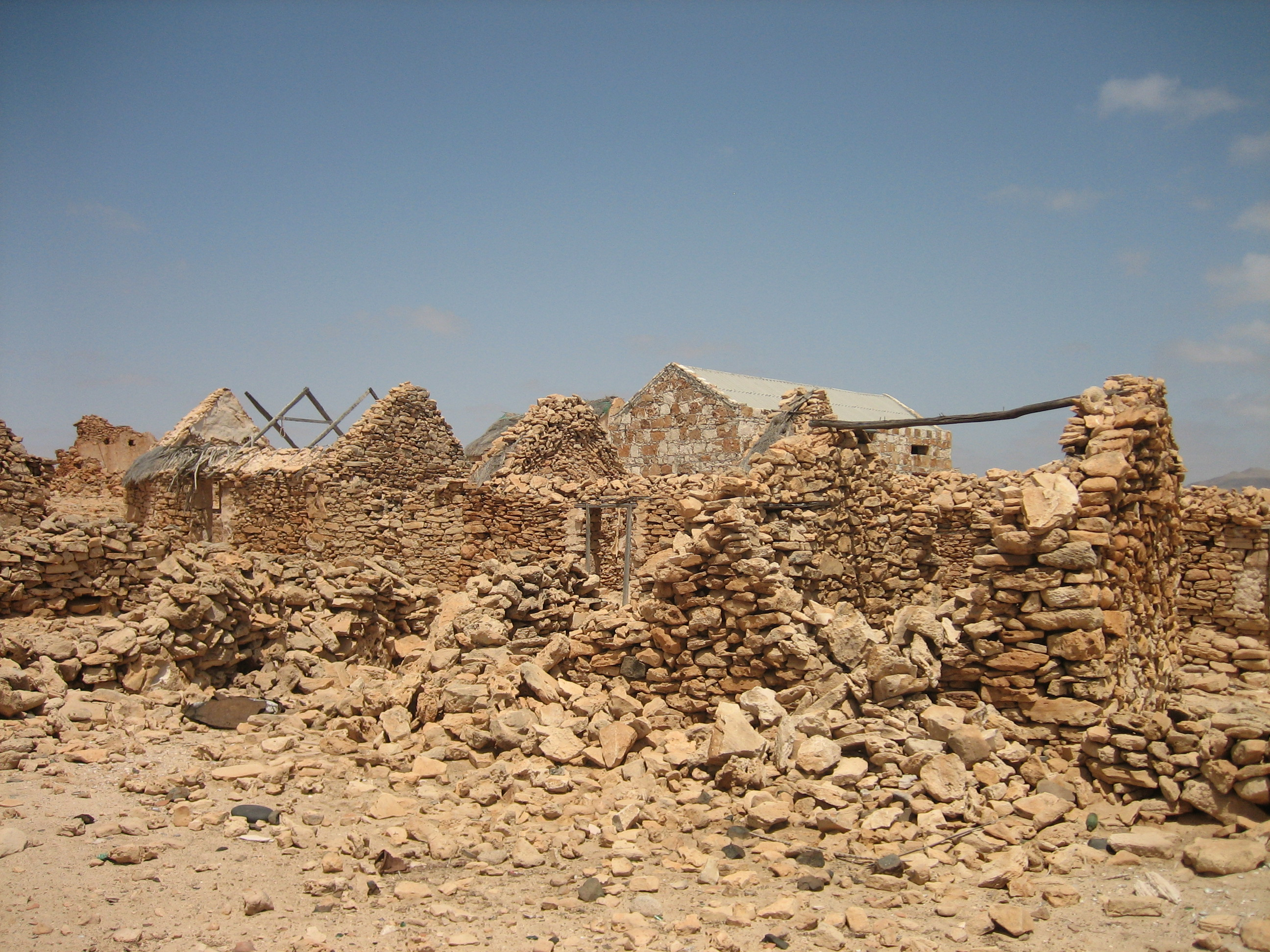
Ruins of the abandoned village Curral Velho

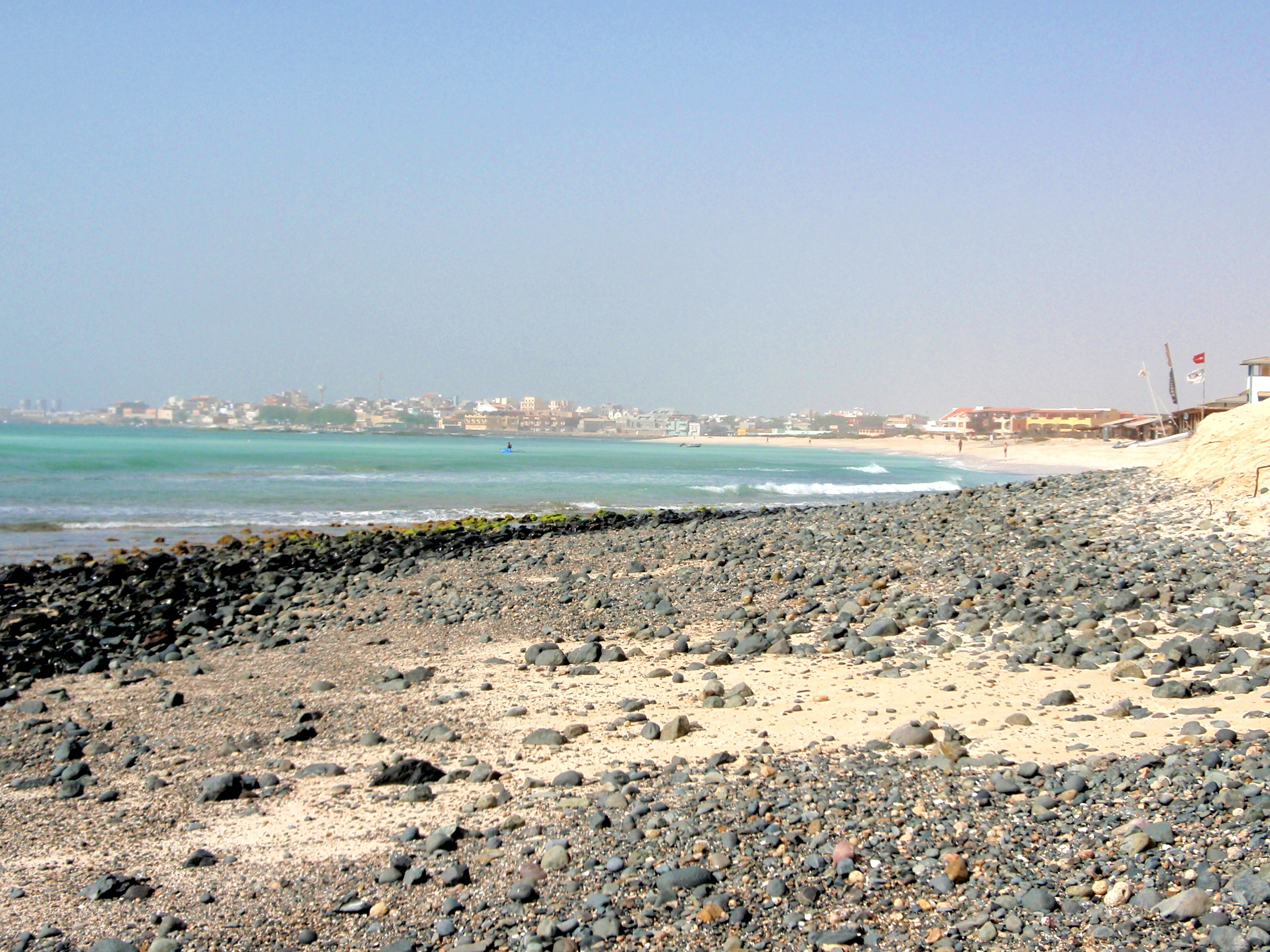
Sal Rei beach

== Sports ==
There are several football clubs on Boa Vista, organised in the Boa Vista Regional Football Association.

== Notable residents ==
- Germano Almeida, writer
- Aristides Pereira, Cape Verde's first president
