= List of beaches of Cape Verde =

This is a list of beaches in Cape Verde.

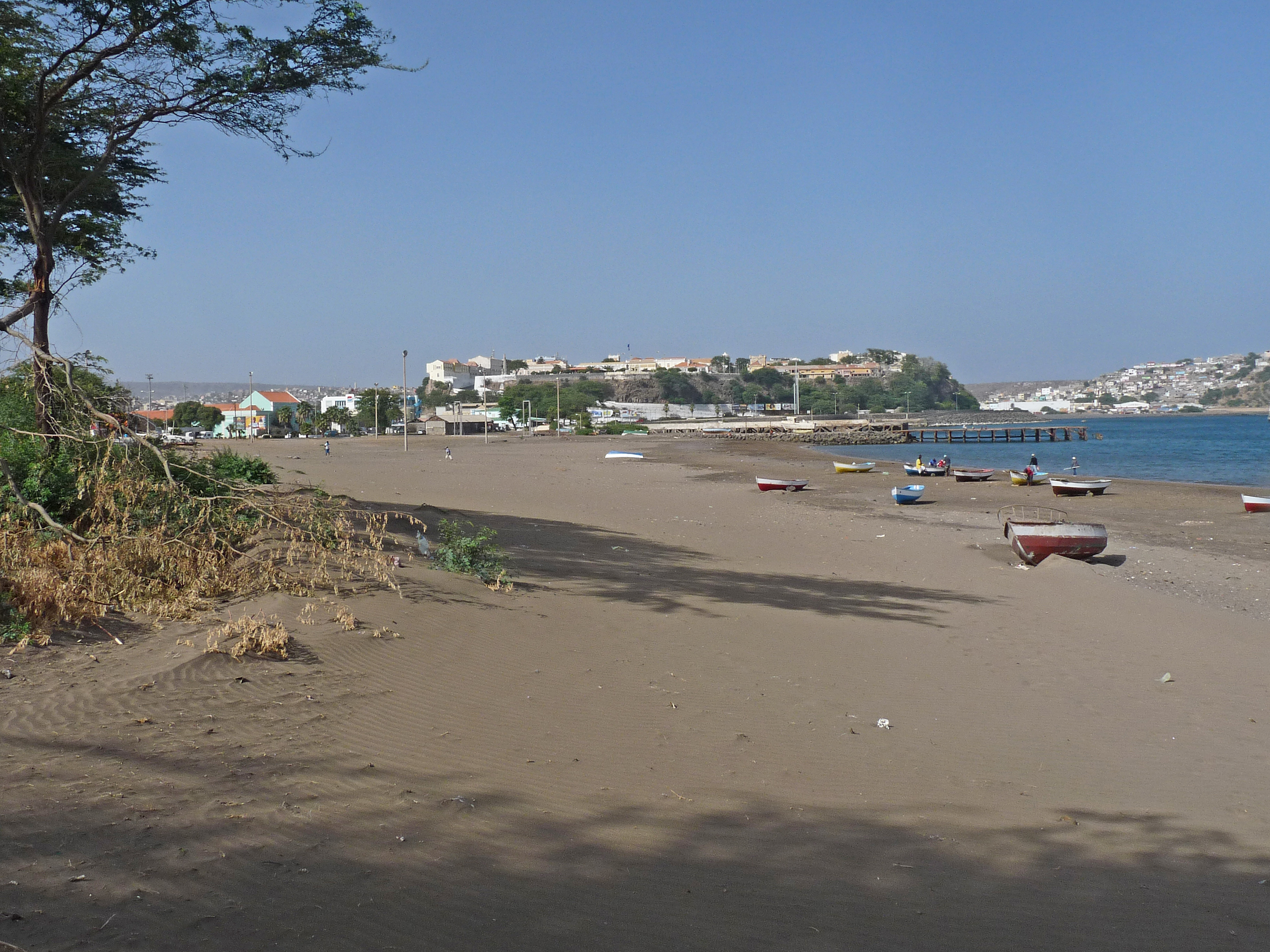
Praia da Gamboa on the island of Santiago

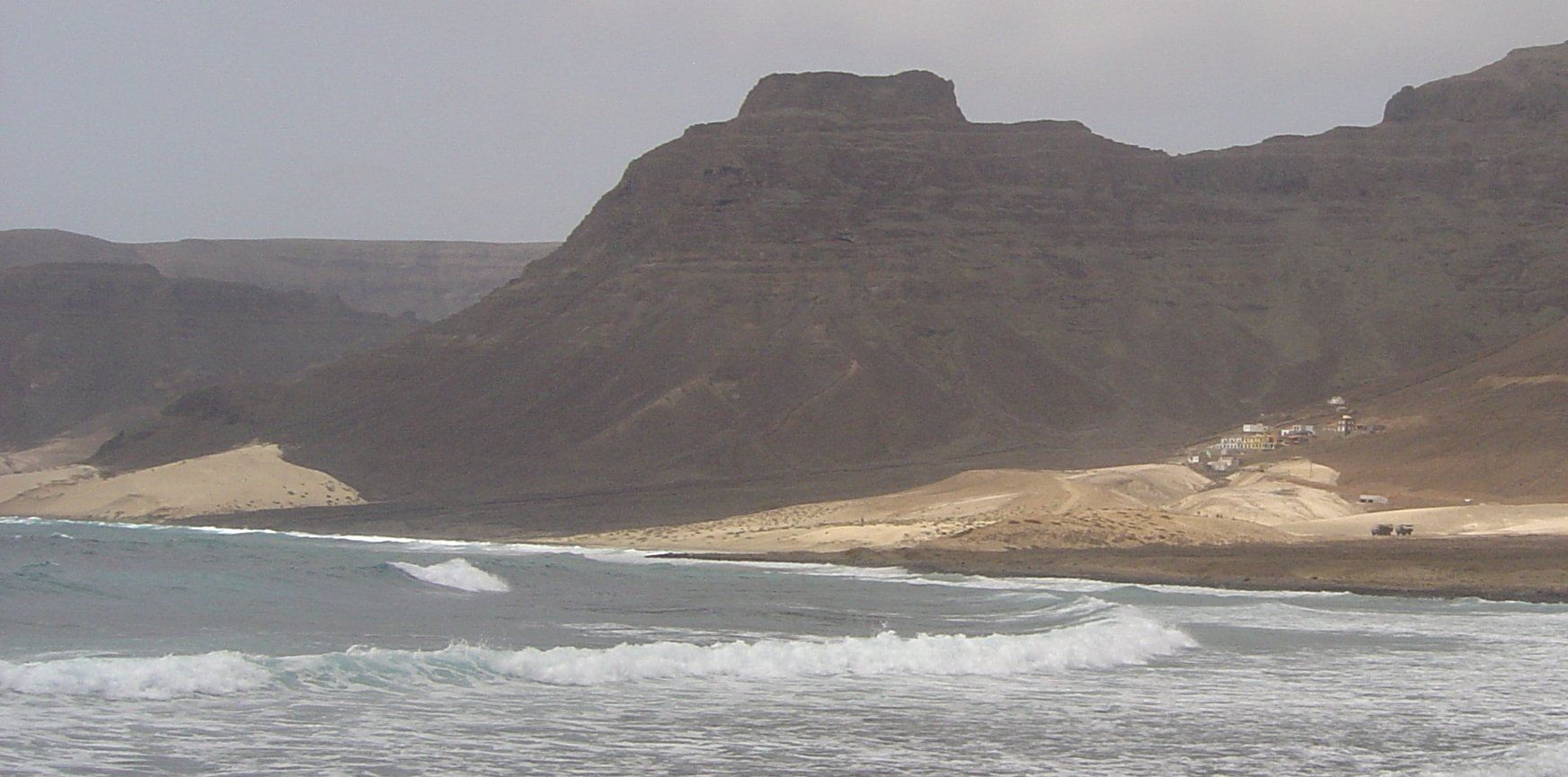
Praia Grande on the island of São Vicente

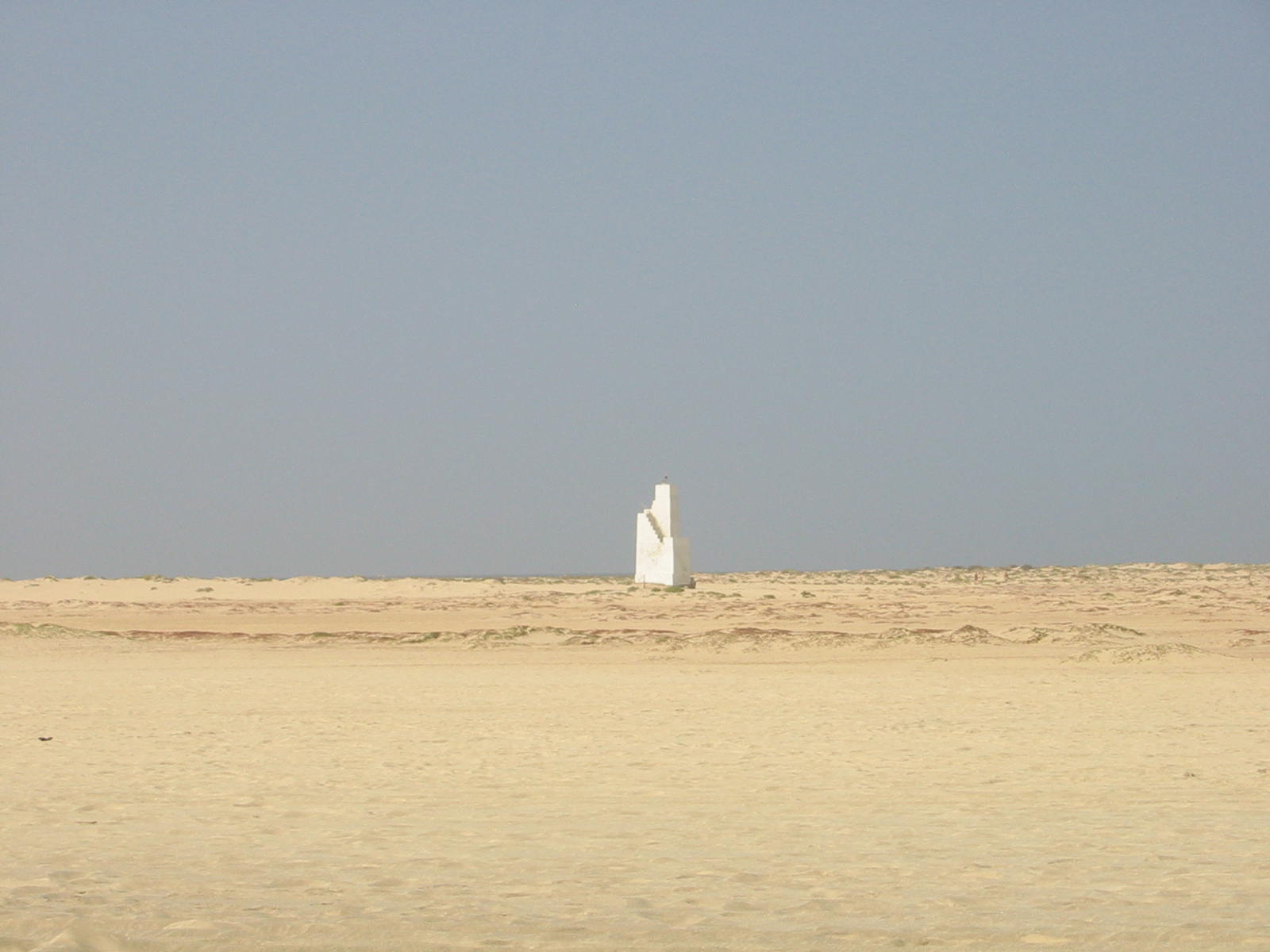
Praia de Santa Maria on the island of Sal

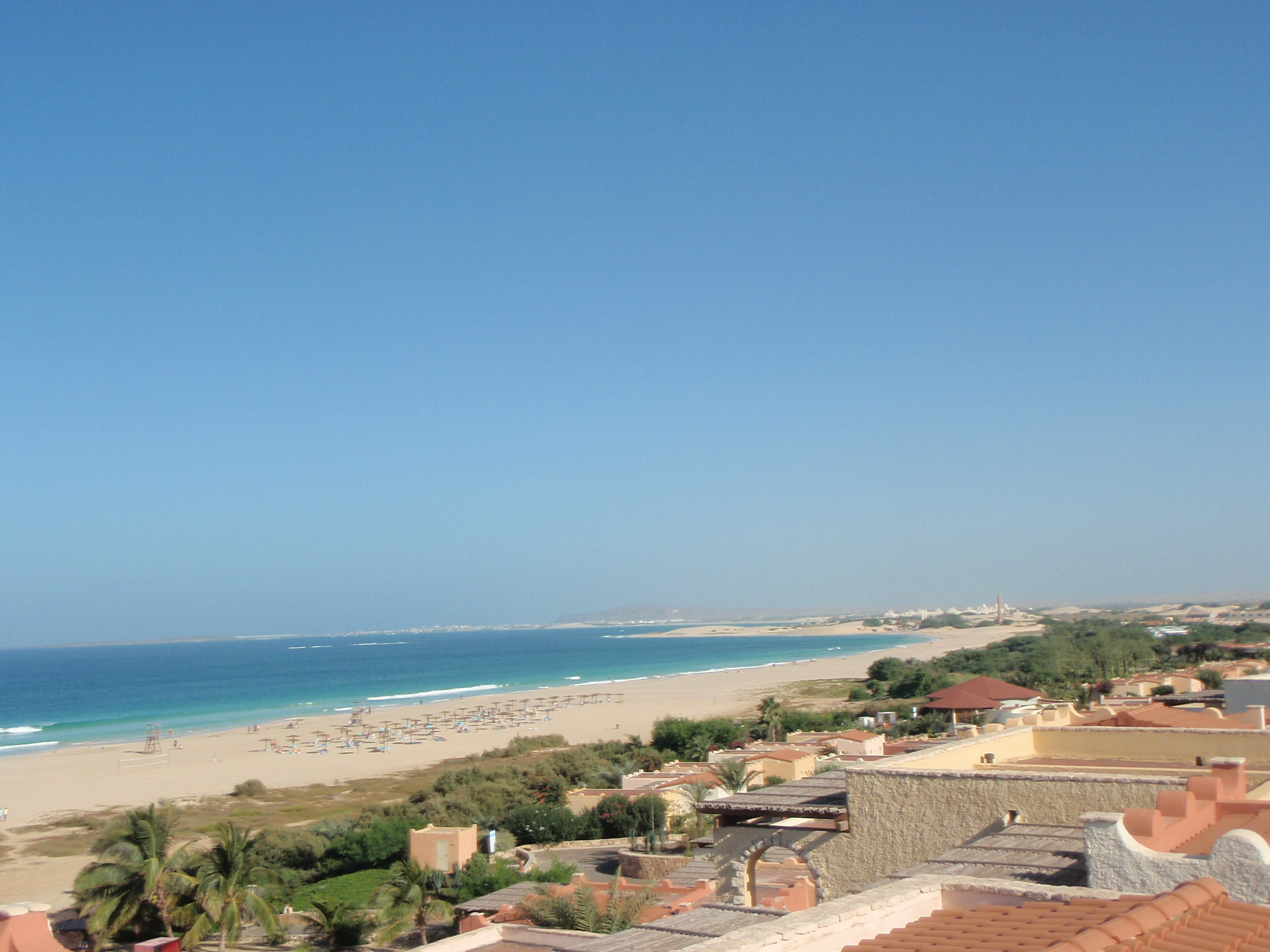
Praia da Chave on the island of Boa Vista

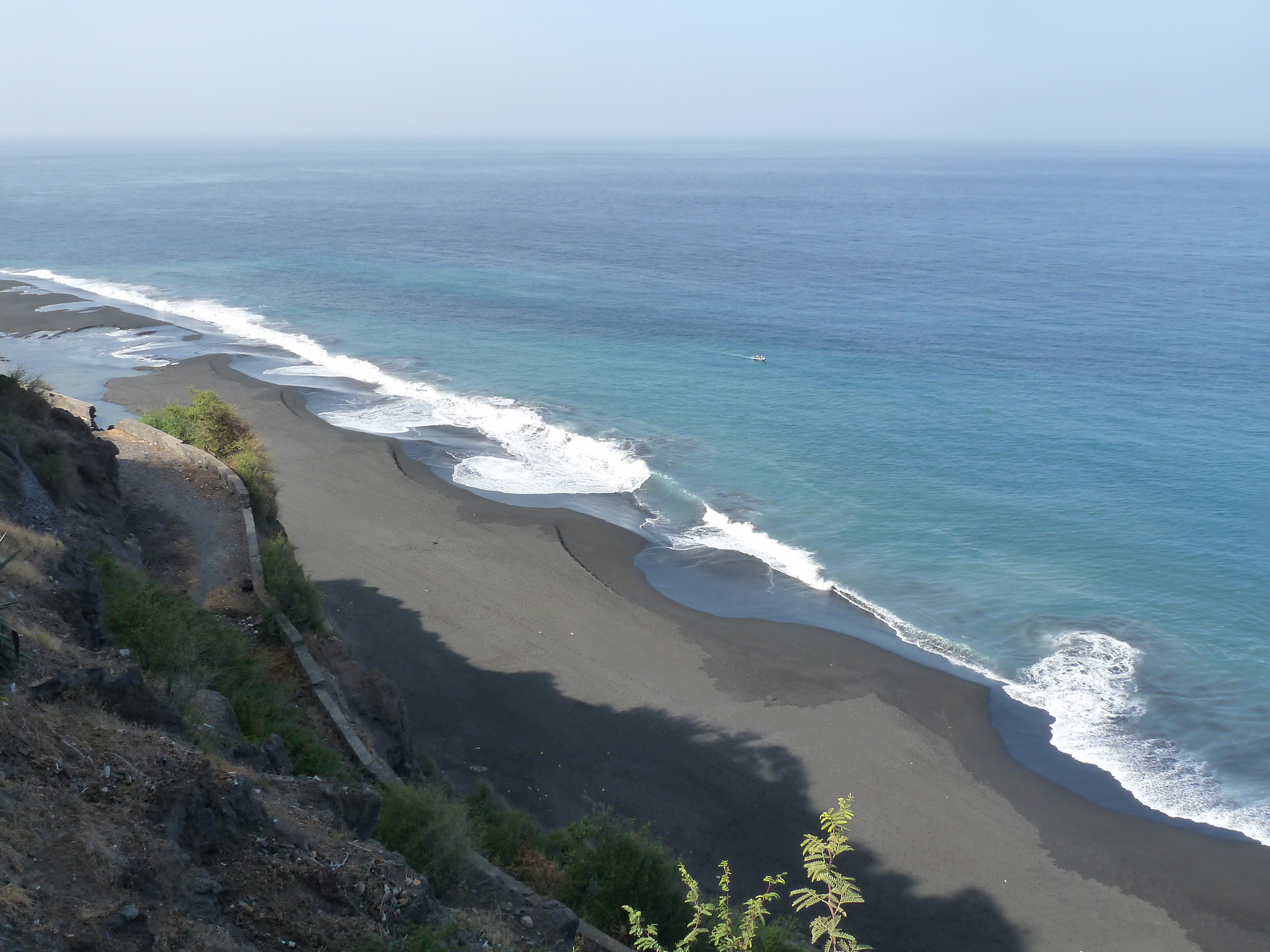
Praia Bila Baxo on the island of Fogo

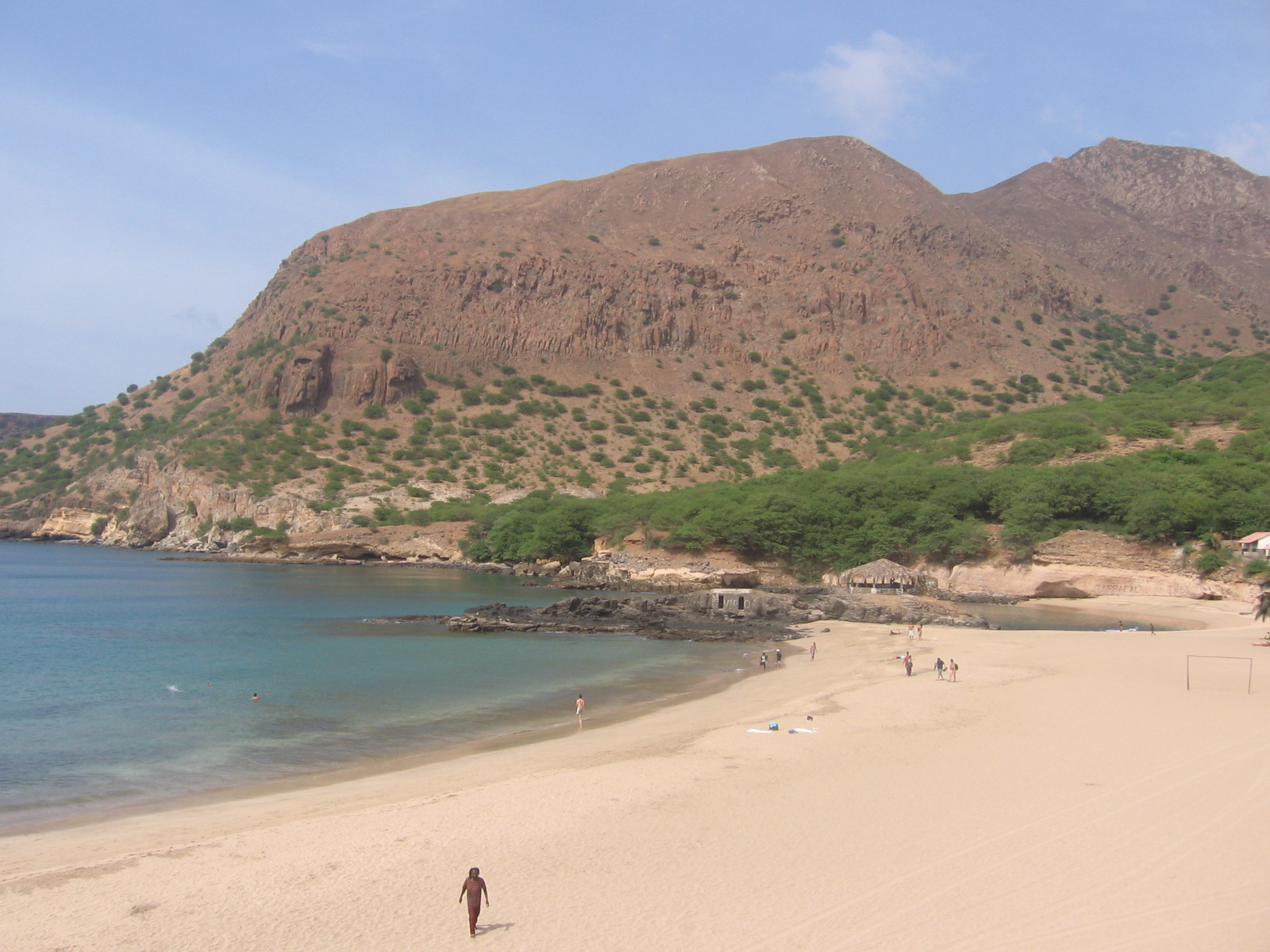
Tarrafal Beach on the island of Santiago

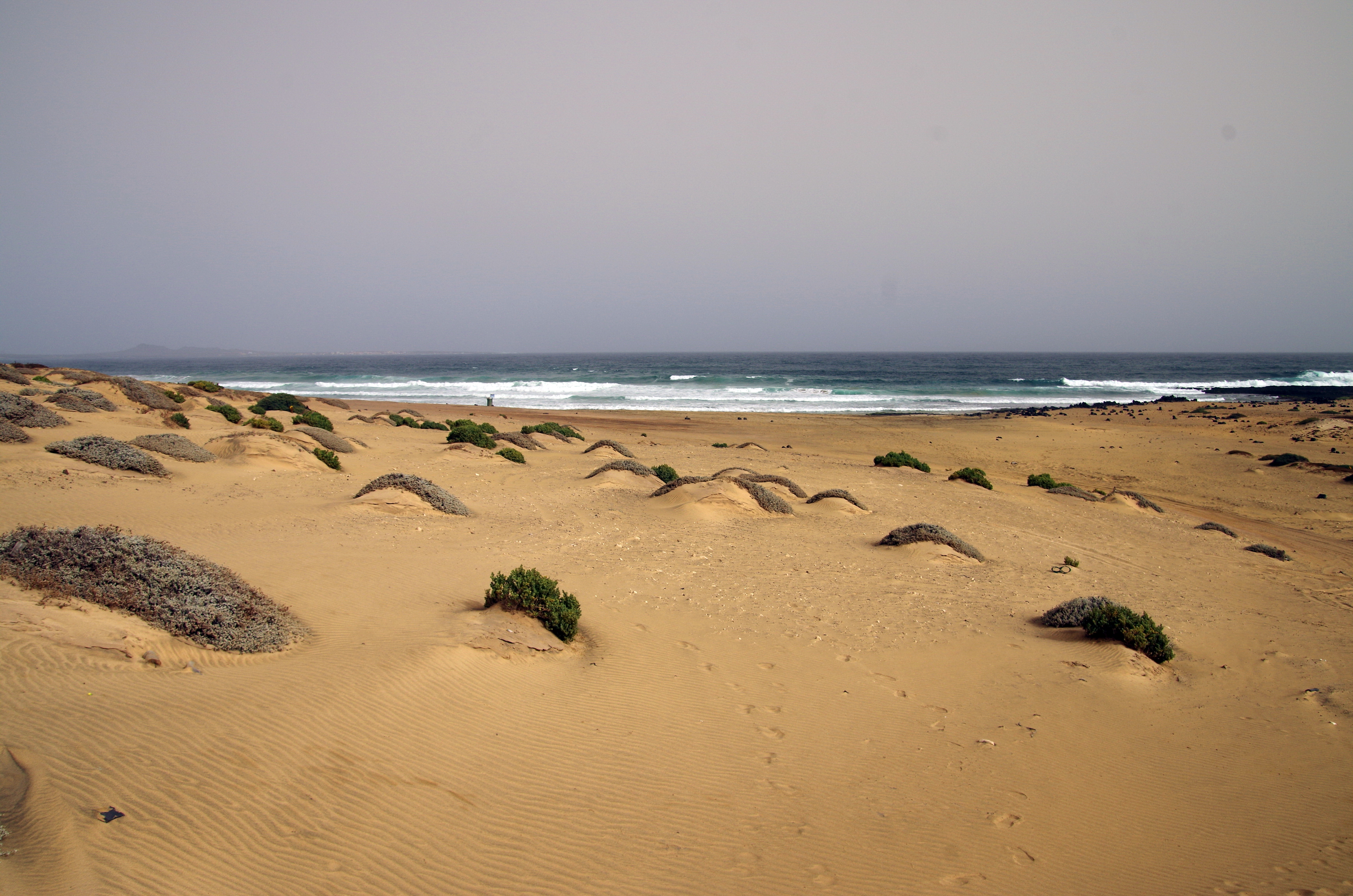
Baía das Gatas's beach on the island of São Vicente

== Boa Vista ==
- Praia de Atalanta
- Praia de Cabral
- Praia de Carquejinha
- Praia de Chaves
- Ervatão
- Praia das Gatas
- Praia de Santa Mónica
- Praia da Varandinha

== Maio ==
- Praia Gonçalo

== Sal ==
- Praia de Santa Maria - south

== Santiago ==
- Praia Baixo
- Praia da Gamboa, Praia

== Santo Antão ==
- Praia d'Aranhas

== São Vicente ==
- Baía das Gatas
- Boca da Lapa
- Praia dos Flamengos - south
- Praia Grande - northeast
