= Ponta Preta (Southern Sal) =

Point in the southern part of the island of Sal

- Headland
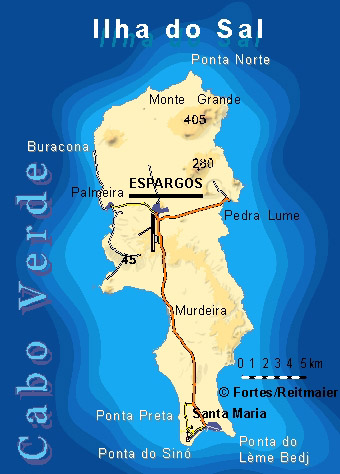
- Ponta Preta, its location is in the southwest of the island

- Location within Cape Verde
- Coordinates: 16°36′21″N 22°55′47″W
- Location: Southern Sal, Cape Verde
- Water bodies: Atlantic Ocean

Ponta Preta (Portuguese meaning "black tip") is a headland in the southwest of the island of Sal in Cape Verde. It is about 2 km west of the town Santa Maria and about 2 km of Ponta do Sinó, the southernmost point of the island. It lies within the nature reserve Ponta do Sinó, at the edge of a tourism development zone.

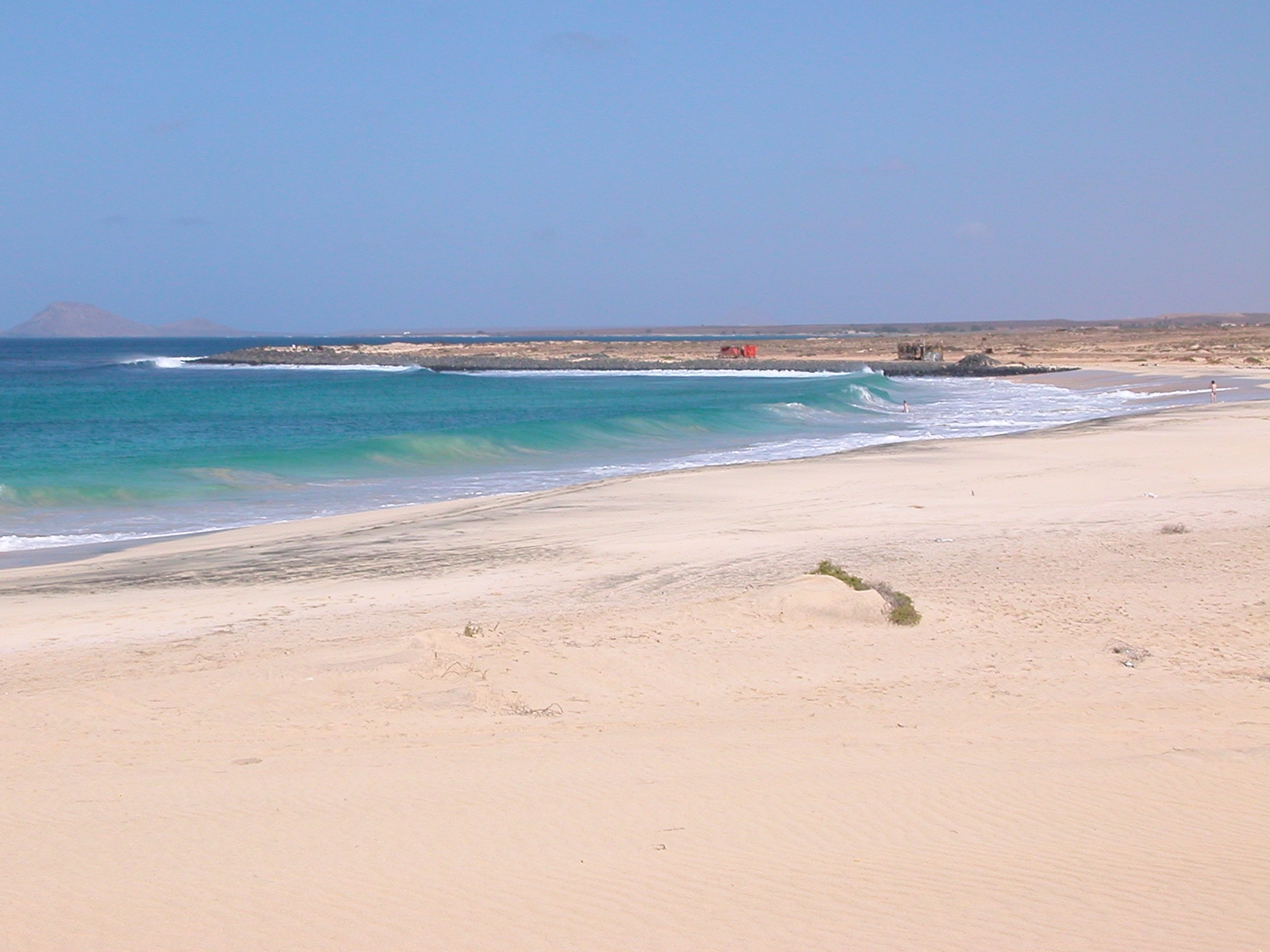
View of Ponta Preta and its beach in 2004

== See also ==
- List of beaches in Cape Verde
- Tourism in Cape Verde
