= Praia de Santa Maria =

Beach in Cape Verde

- Beach
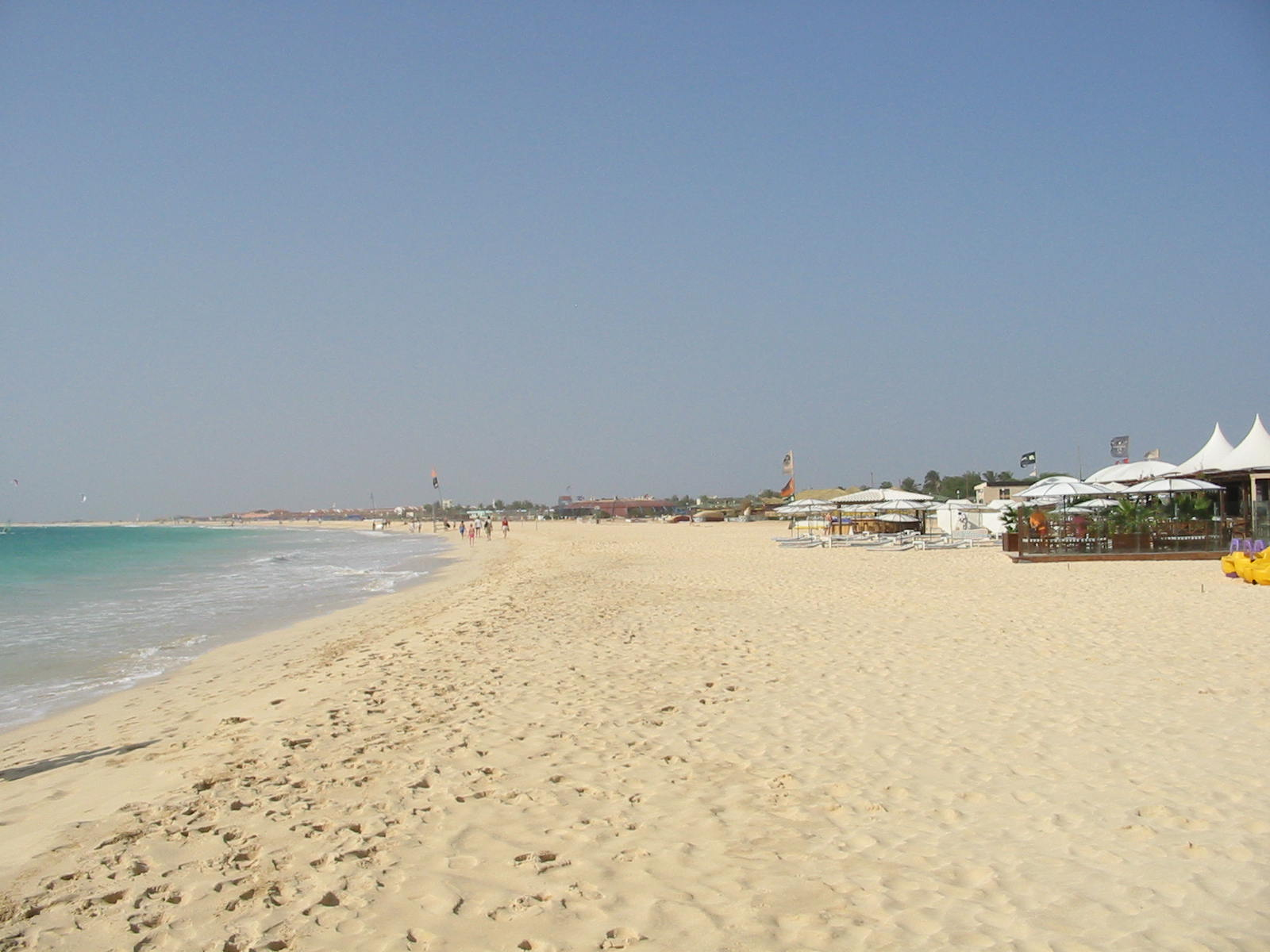
- Santa Maria Beach in 2004

- Coordinates: 16.5914°N 22.9147°W
- Location: Southwest of Santa Maria in Sal, Cape Verde

Praia de Santa Maria is a beach on the south coast of the island of Sal, Cape Verde. It stretches from the city center of Santa Maria in the east to the Ponta do Sinó (the island's southernmost point) in the southwest. It is about 2 km long. Along with Praia da Ponta Preta, it is the most popular beach on the city and island.

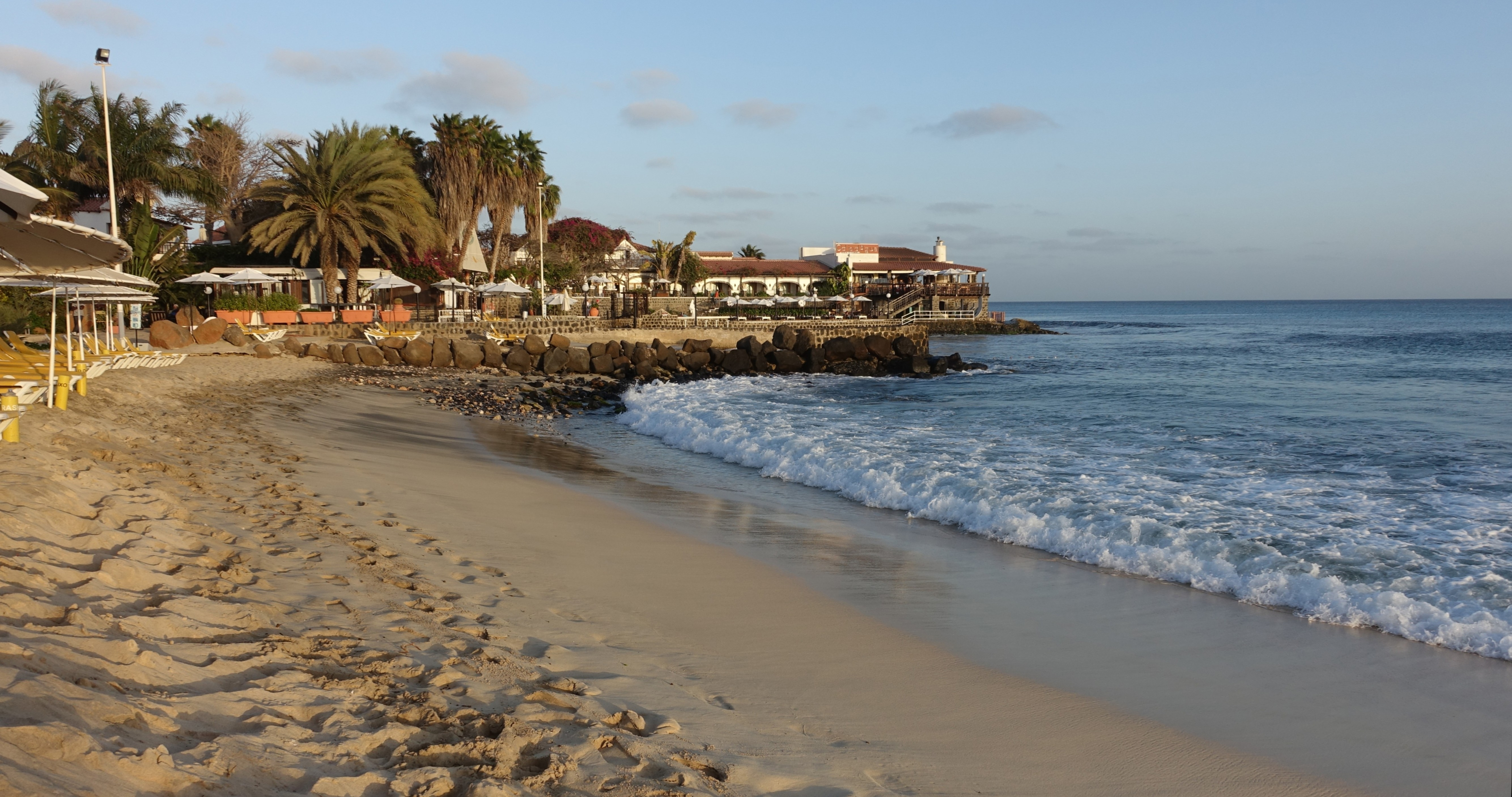
The eastern end of the beach with its pier, Ponta de Vera Cruz, a hotel and a lighthouse

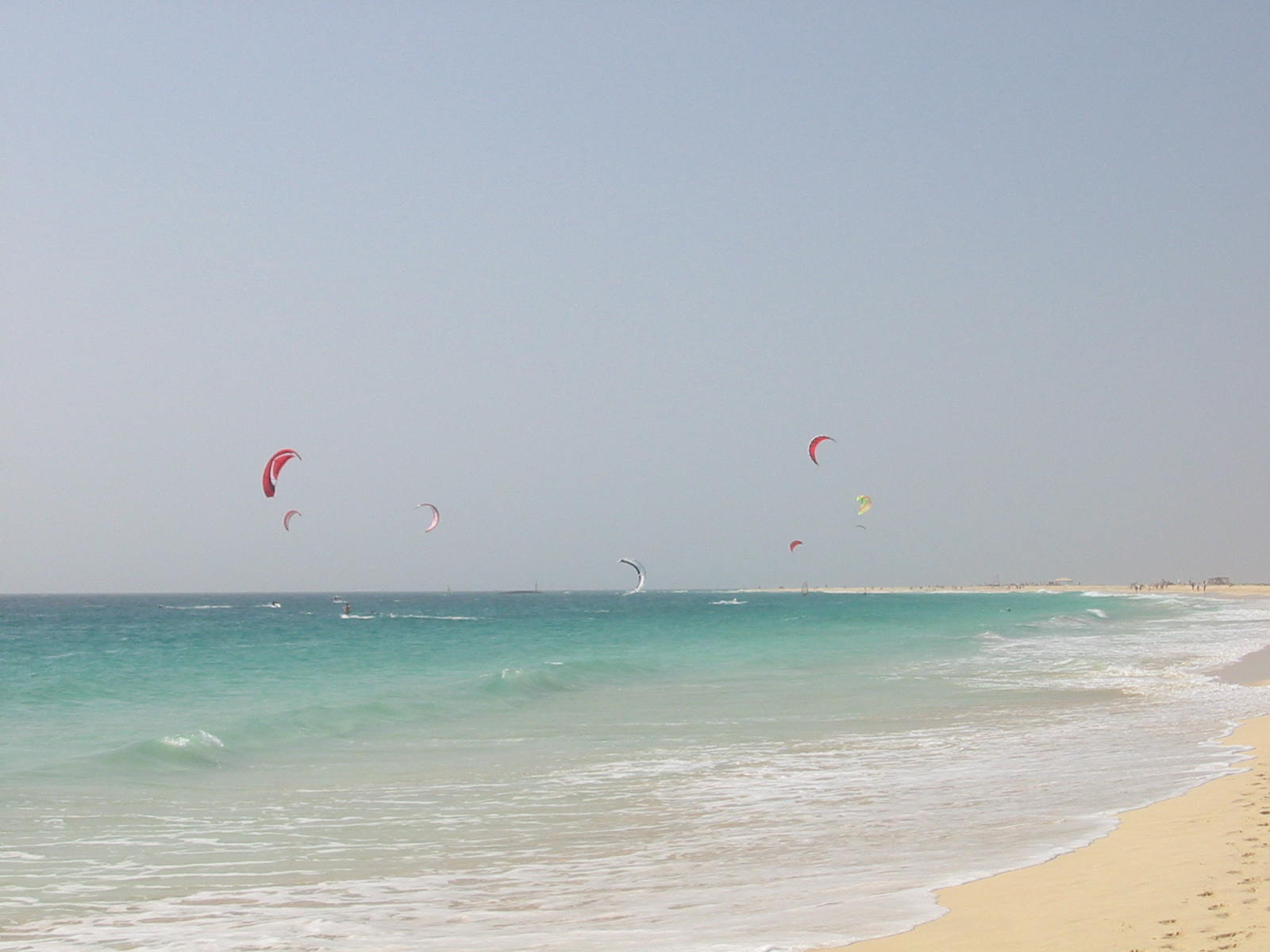
Kitesurfing at the beach

Each year in mid September, the island's music festival Festival da Praia de Santa Maria takes place at the beach.

== See also ==
- List of beaches in Cape Verde
- Tourism in Cape Verde
