= Ponta do Leme Velho =

- Headland
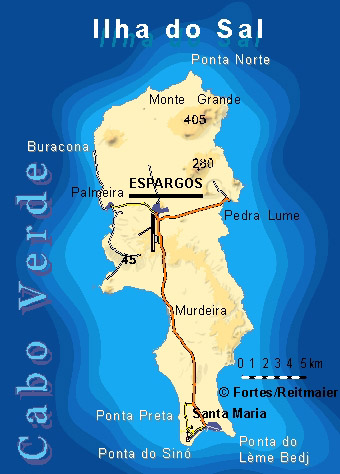
- Ponta do Leme Velho, its location is in the extreme southeast of the island

- Location within Cape Verde
- Coordinates: 16°35′32″N 22°53′13″W
- Location: Southeastern Sal, Cape Verde
- Water bodies: Atlantic Ocean

Ponta do Leme Velho is a headland on the southeast coast of the island of Sal, Cape Verde. It is about 2 km east of the town of Santa Maria.

Also referred to as Ponta do Leme Bedj as seen in the map.
