= Santa Maria Beach =

Santa Maria Beach may refer to:

- Praia de Santa Maria, beach in Cape Verde
- Santa Maria Beach in the Philippines
- Santa Maria or Playa Grande, a beach in Peru
- Santa Maria beach at the start of Capo Vaticano, Italy
- Cape Santa Maria Beach at Seymour's, Long Island, Bahamas

== See also ==
- Cayo Santa María beach, Cuba
