= Praia de Chaves =

Beach in Cape Verde

- Beach
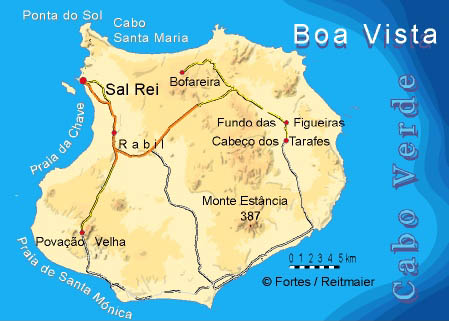
- Praia da Chave, its location is in the west of the island
- Interactive map of Praia de Chaves
- Coordinates: 16.112°N 22.917°W
- Location: Western Boa Vista, Cape Verde

Dimensions
  - Length: 5 km (3.1 mi)
- Access: road

Praia de Chaves (also: Praia da Chave) is a beach in the western part of the island of Boa Vista in Cape Verde, close to the town Rabil. It is about 5 km long.

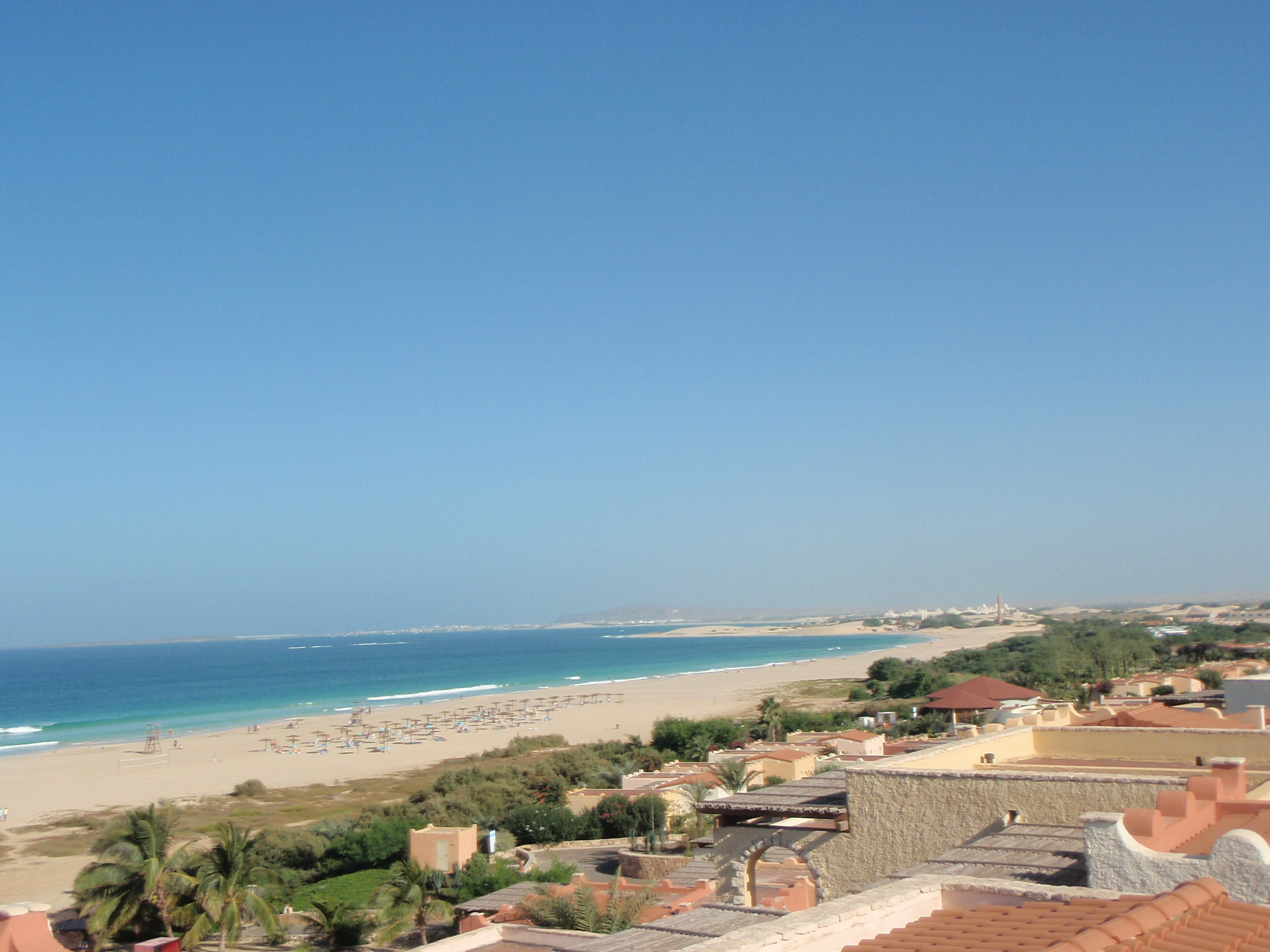
Praia de Chaves with its hotels and resorts

At the northern part of the beach, close to Rabil, tourist resorts have been developed. The southern part is included in the Morro de Areia Nature Reserve.

== See also ==
- List of beaches of Cape Verde
- Tourism in Cape Verde
