= Praia de Carquejinha =

Beach in Cape Verde

- Beach
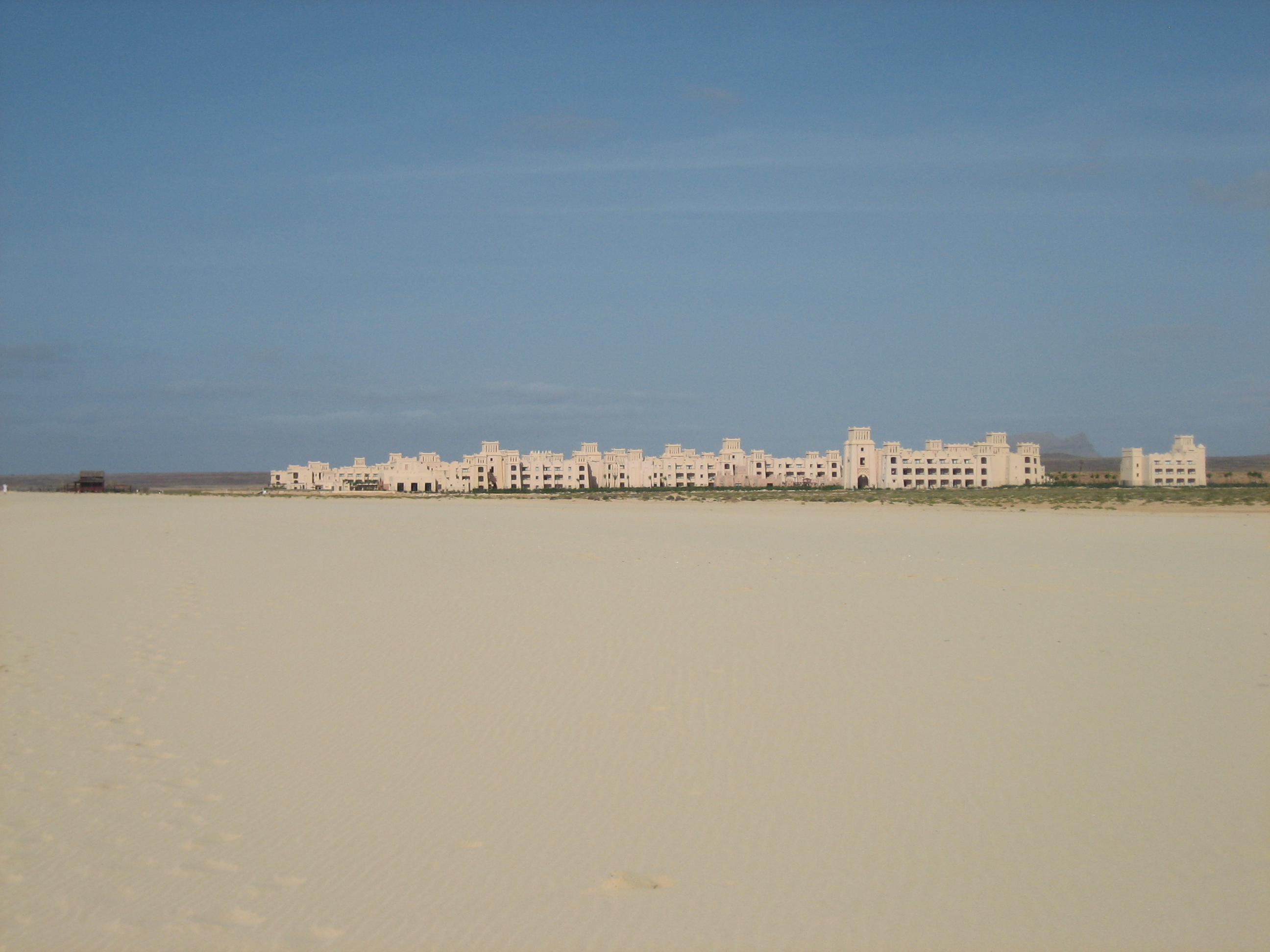
- Tuareg Resort in the village of Curral Velho across Praia de Carquejinha

- Coordinates: 15.976°N 22.855°W
- Location: Southwestern Boa Vista, Cape Verde

Praia de Carquejinha is a beach on the south coast of the island of Boa Vista in Cape Verde Neighboring beaches are Praia de Santa Mónica to the west and Praia de Curral Velho to the east. The beach is about 8 km long.

== See also ==
- List of beaches of Cape Verde
