= Morro de Areia Nature Reserve =

Protected area in Cape Verde

Morro de Areia Nature Reserve Reserva Natureza de Morro de Areia
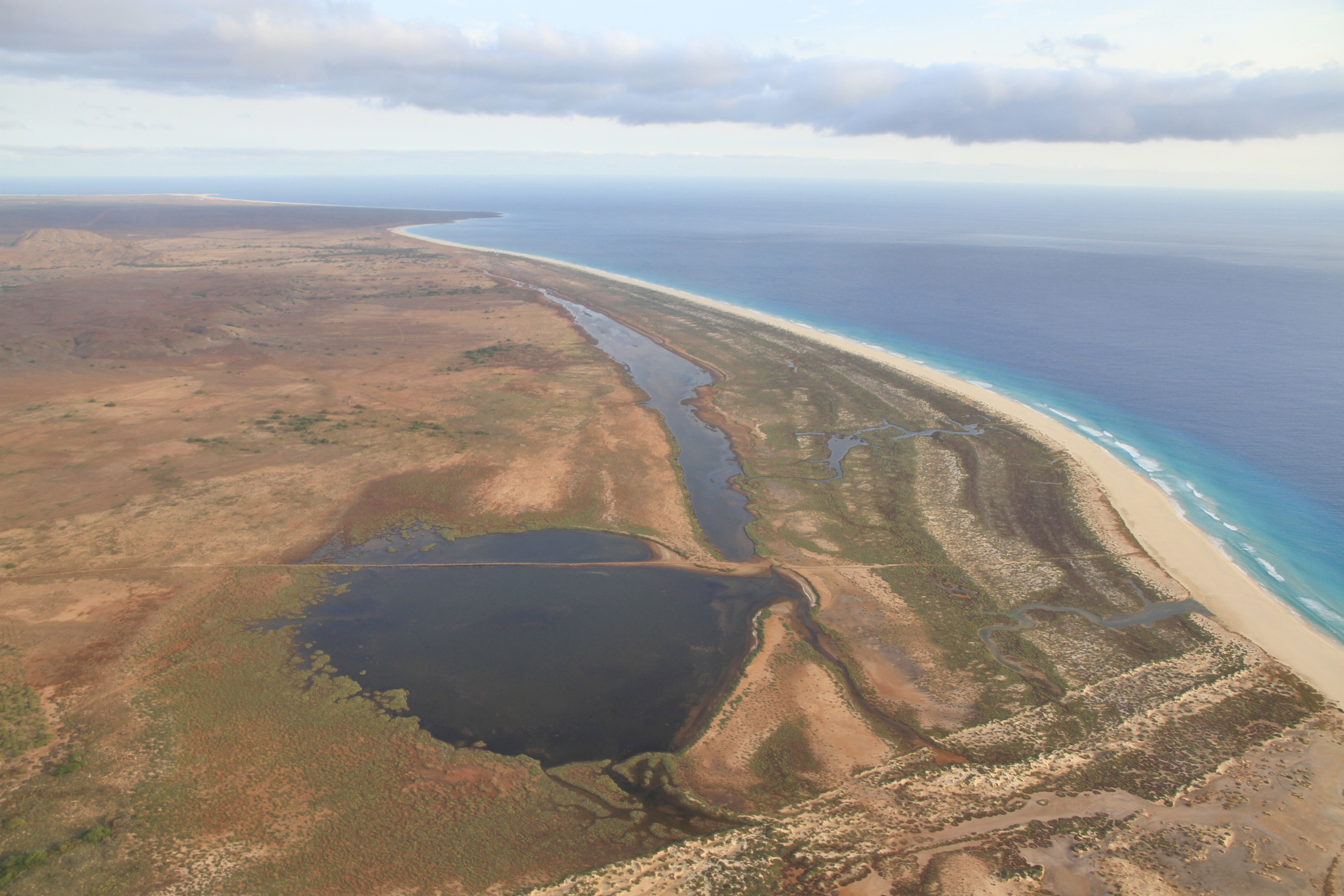
- Praia de Santa Mónica and its vicinity
- Interactive map of Morro de Areia Nature Reserve; Reserva Natureza de Morro de Areia
- Location: Southwestern Boa Vista, Cape Verde
- Coordinates: 16°04′34″N 22°56′49″W
- Area: 25.85 km^{2} (9.98 sq mi)
- Max. elevation: 167 m (548 ft)

Morro de Areia Nature Reserve (Portuguese: Reserva Natural do Morro de Areia) is a nature reserve covering the southwestern coast of the island of Boa Vista in Cape Verde. It takes its name from the hill Morro de Areia, 167 m (548 ft) elevation. The natural reserve covers 21.31 km^{2} of land area, and stretches along the coast from the Praia de Chaves in the north to the Praia de Santa Monica in the south. The reserve includes a 300 m wide marine protection zone, an additional 4.36 km^{2}.

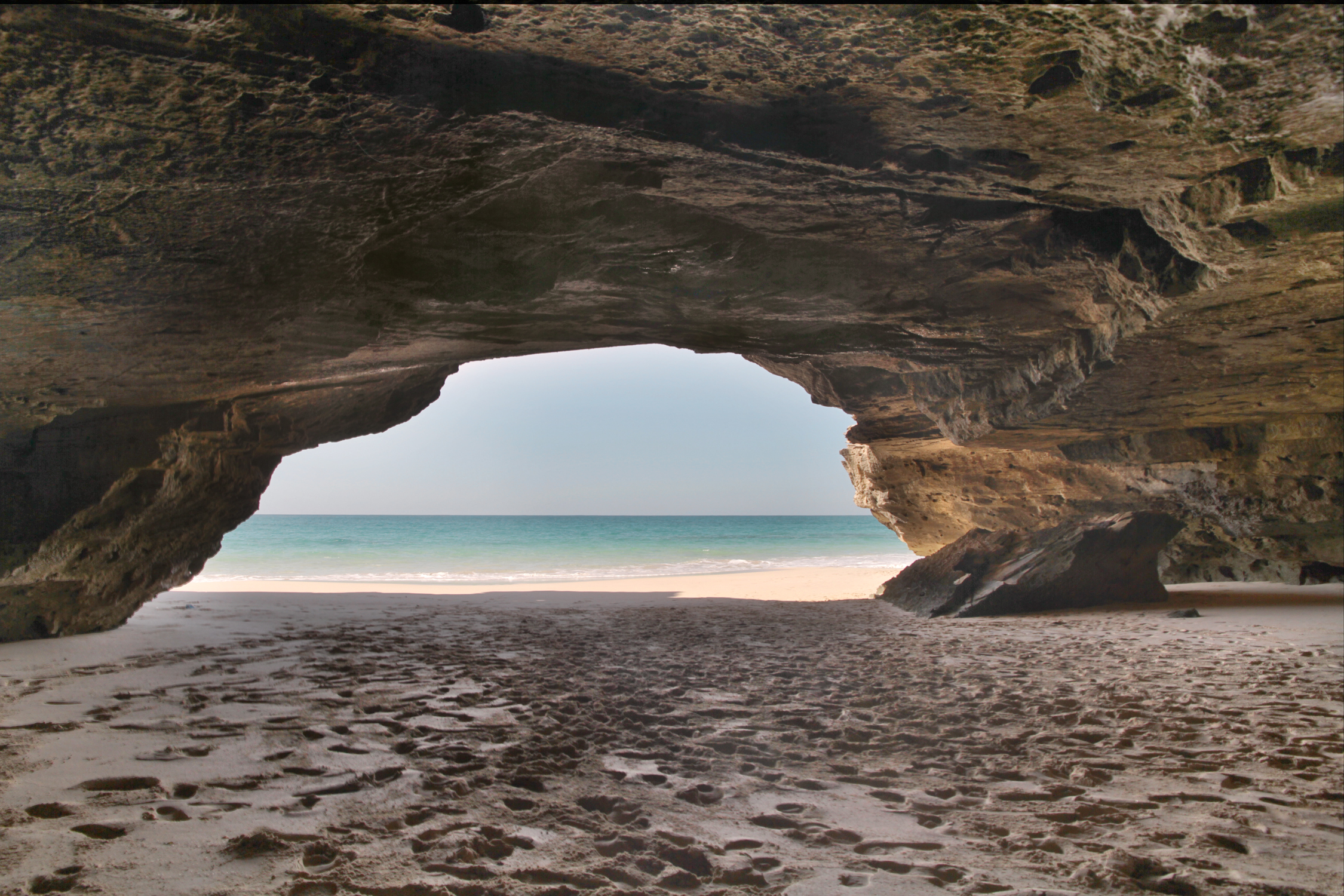
Bracona cave near Praia da Varandinha

== Fauna ==
The nature reserve was established in order to protect the sand dynamics of the dunes, and endemic wildlife species including red-billed tropicbird, osprey, turtles, nurse shark, and numerous invertebrates.

== See also ==
- List of protected areas in Cape Verde
