= Ponta Varandinha =

Westernmost point of Boa Vista, Cape Verde

- Headland
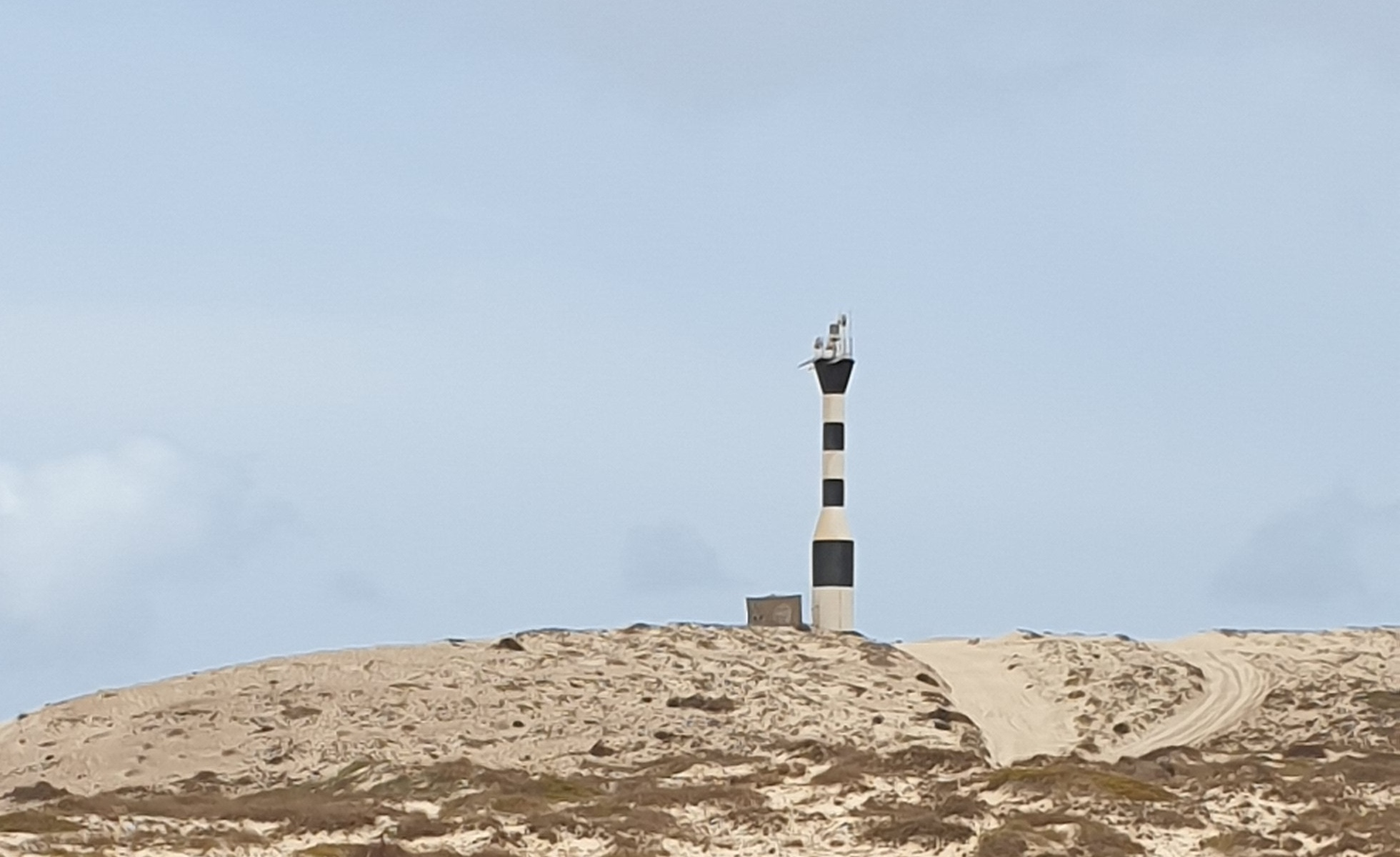

- Location within Cape Verde
- Coordinates: 16°02′32″N 22°57′57″W
- Location: Southwestern Boa Vista, Cape Verde
- Water bodies: Atlantic Ocean

Ponta Varandinha is a headland and the westernmost point of the island of Boa Vista, Cape Verde. To its north lies the beach Praia da Varandinha. The nearest village is Povoação Velha, 5 km (3.1 mi) to the east. There is a lighthouse on the cape. Its focal height is 22 meters (72 ft) and its range extends to 10 nautical miles (19 km; 12 mi).
