= Praia da Varandinha =

Beach in Cape Verde

- Beach
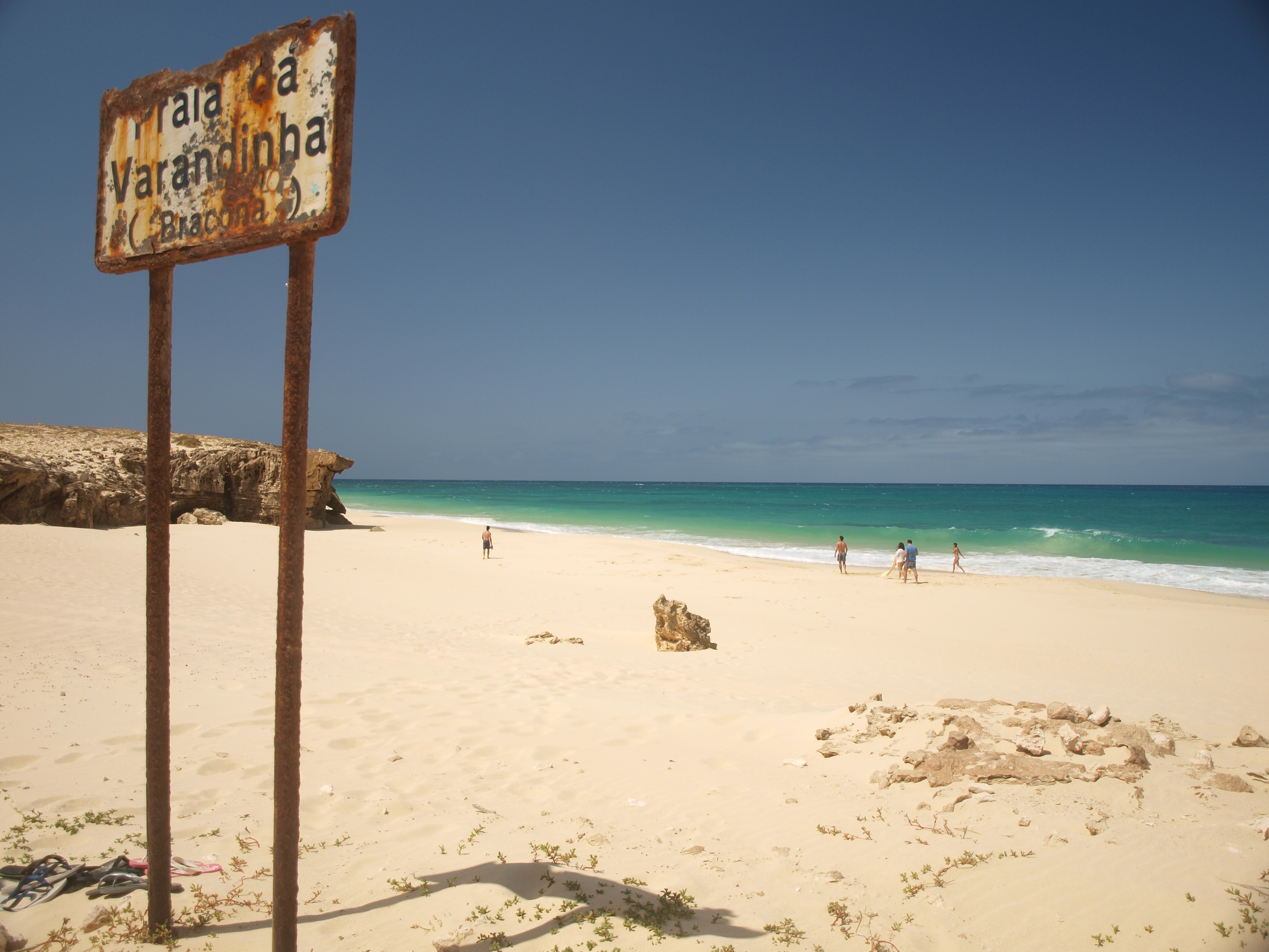
- Praia da Varandinha

- Coordinates: 16.0527°N 22.9613°W
- Location: Southwestern Boa Vista, Cape Verde

Praia da Varandinha is a beach on the southwest coast of the island of Boa Vista in Cape Verde. It lies north of the headland Ponta Varandinha. The beach forms part of the protected area Morro de Areia Nature Reserve.

== See also ==
- List of beaches of Cape Verde
