= Ponta de Vera Cruz =

Headland at Santa Maria, Cape Verde

- Headland
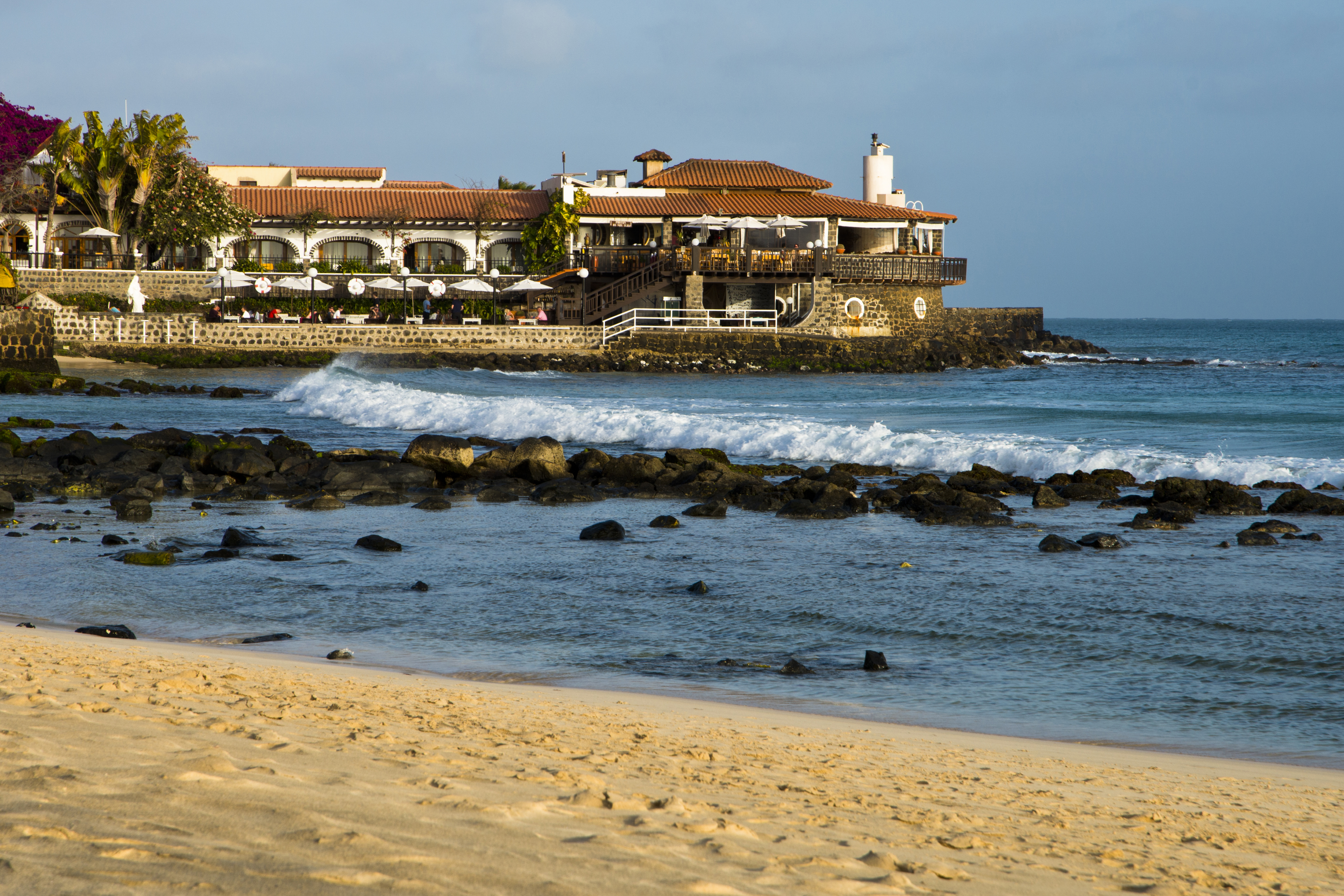
- Ponta de Vera Cruz, its lighthouse and a hotel

- Ponta de Vera Cruz
- Coordinates: 16°35′47″N 22°54′15″W
- Location: centre of Santa Maria, southern Sal, Cape Verde
- Offshore water bodies: Atlantic Ocean
- Ponta de Vera Cruz Lighthouse; Farol de Ponta de Vera Cruz
- Height: 4 m (13 ft)
- Shape: cylinder
- Markings: White
- Power source: solar power
- Focal height: 9 m (30 ft)
- Characteristic: F R

Ponta de Vera Cruz is a headland at the waterfront of the city Santa Maria in the south of Sal, Cape Verde. It is situated near the harbour of Santa Maria. There is a lighthouse on the headland, attached to a restaurant.

== See also ==
- List of lighthouses in Cape Verde
- List of buildings and structures in Cape Verde
