= Ervatão =

Beach in Boa Vista, Cape Verde

- Beach
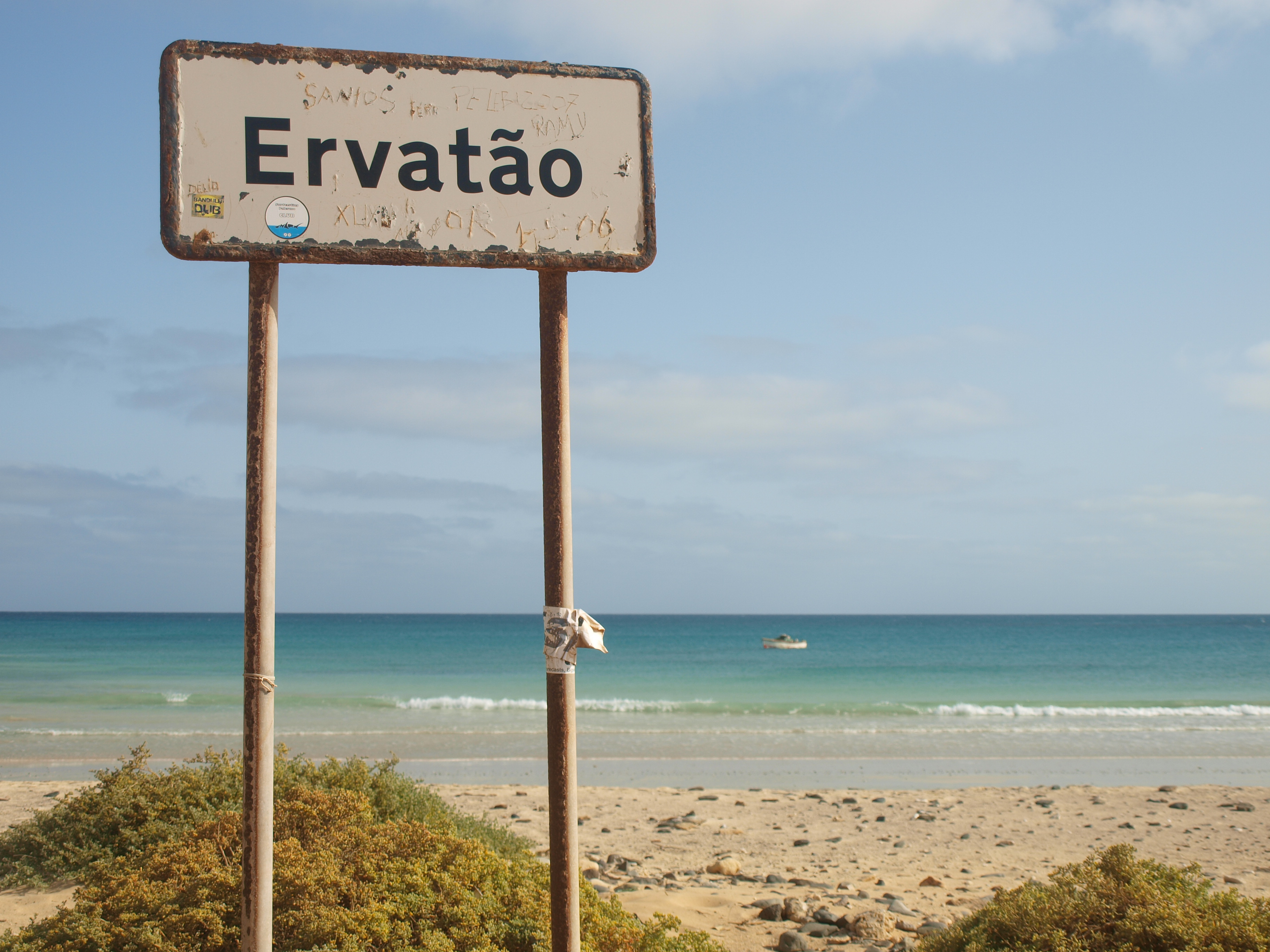
- Ervatão

- Coordinates: 16.042°N 22.698°W
- Location: Southeastern Boa Vista, Cape Verde

Ervatão or Porto de Ervatão is a beach on the southeast coast of the island of Boa Vista in Cape Verde. At its eastern end is the headland Ponta de Ervatão, and at its western end is the headland Ponta Cosme. Ervatão is part of the Turtle Nature Reserve (Portuguese: Reserva Natural Tartaruga). The area of Ervatão receives 70% of all turtles nesting on Boa Vista. In July 2009, 8,000 turtle nests were counted.

== See also ==
- List of beaches in Cape Verde
