= Marguerite Massart =

- Born: 19 September 1900; Brussels, Belgium
- Died: 25 February 1979 (aged 78); Ghent, Belgium
- Occupation: Engineer
- Spouse: Gustave Vynckier

Marguerite Massart (19 September 1900 – 25 February 1979) was the first woman to graduate as an engineer in Belgium. She set up a successful foundry business in Ghent and later introduced a desalinisation project and early solar panels in the first hotel on Sal Island in Cape Verde.

== Early life ==
Marguerite Massart was born in Brussels, Belgium on 19 September 1900. Her mother ran a business supplying copper instruments in the city centre and her father Arthur Massart was the Belgian representative for a French metal company.

== Education ==
Massart showed a particular interest in the sciences and mathematics in school, and chose to attend the Lycée Dachsbeck in Brussels, a school specialising in mathematics. Then in 1918 she entered the Université libre de Bruxelles (ULB). Her older brother Arsene had studied there and helped pave the way for her.

She graduated in 1922 with a degree in civil engineering, making her the first woman to qualify as an engineer in Belgium. This news was reported internationally.

The following year she gained a further qualification as an electrical engineer from the Ecole Montefiore-Levi in Liège.

== Career ==
As soon as she left university, Massart joined the Association des Ingenieurs de Bruxelles (AIBr)an association of engineers who had graduated from the Université libre de Bruxelles. She became general secretary of the organisation in 1925. She remained in close contact with the AIBr throughout her life, donating large sums of money to various relief funds, especially during the Second World War.

Her studies completed, Massart found a job at a Patent Agent's Office in Brussels, where part of her work involved drawing up patent specifications.

In April 1924, Massart spoke at the second International Conference of Women Engineers in Manchester, organised by the British-based Women's Engineering Society, reading "a very clever paper" on Alternating Current Motors. She was elected a member of the Women's Engineer Society in March 1925, its first Belgian member.

In July 1927, Marguerite Massart married Gaspard Vynckier, (1896 – 1972) who ran an electrical equipment business, Vynckier Frères & Co. with his brother Maurice. Initially a small company in Brussels, it grew rapidly once established in Ghent, at its height employing 2,200 people and manufacturing all kinds of electrical equipment (switches, distribution boxes, fuses, bakelite cases and railway equipment). It is thought the couple met through her parents’ business interests in metals supply, as his electrical business needed access to copper for electrical wiring.

== Ghent ==
After their marriage, the couple settled in Ghent and Massart gave birth to two sons, Georges Gaspard Arthur Gustave Vynckier and Lucien Richard Arsène Urbain Vynckier, who both grew up to have careers as engineers. In 1937, the family moved into a large house with a corner tower, (built in 1896) in Coupure Rechts, a smart area of Ghent.

Whilst bringing up her young family, Massart also set up and managed her own successful company, the Cupro Foundry, working with non-ferrous metals.

She became involved in the social life of Ghent, taking a significant role in the local Soroptimists and setting up a local chapter of the Fédération belge des femmes universitaires (FBFU), a Belgian organisation for early women graduates to support each other.

Massart was very attached to the French language, and fought to protect the use of French at a time when the Belgian state was undertaking a process to increase the use of the Flemish language in education in the Flanders area of northern Belgium. She fought to create a French-speaking element within the curriculum in middle schools in Ghent. This caused her some notoriety in the local press.

== Cape Verde ==
In retirement, Marguerite Massart-Vynckier and her husband travelled to warmer countries during the winter months, in search of a climate better suited for her asthma. They were recommended to try Cape Verde, an archipelago in the Atlantic Ocean, 350 miles off the western coast of the African continent. They first visited in 1963 and on their return home, the couple planned a prefabricated house, completed with plans of its independent energy supply, which could be shipped to Cape Verde and reconstructed there. The house was built in Santa Maria in 1965–66, with the couple spending their winters there.

They installed a small desalination plant, using solar power to run the process. In 1970-71 the couple had the Santa Maria water castle built which supplied clean water to the whole village for many years.

Their home expanded to host accommodation for long haul air flight crew, particularly crews from South African Airways, a South African government owned airline which wasn't permitted to fly over or land in many African countries due to those countries' opposition to apartheid. Cape Verde allowed SAA to overfly and land, and became a centre of activity for the airline's flights to Europe and the United States. In 1967, the couple, with their elder son George, opened Cape Verde's first resort hotel named Morabeza.

The Vynckier family gradually expanded the air crew accommodation into a tourist hotel, which was initially powered by alternative energy sources. The Hotel Morabeza was run by their son George (who undertook the engineering of the energy sources) and daughter-in-law Geneviève Vynckier and is still in existence (in 2020), run by Massart's granddaughter Sophie Vynckier Marcellesi.

== Death and legacy ==
Marguerite Massart lost her husband Gustave Vynckier in 1972, and died of heart failure seven years later in Ghent on 25 February 1979.

A French language technical college Institut de Mécanique et d'Électricité Marguerite Massart in Brussels is named in her honour.
