= Ponta do Sinó =

Headland in Sal, Cape Verde

- Headland
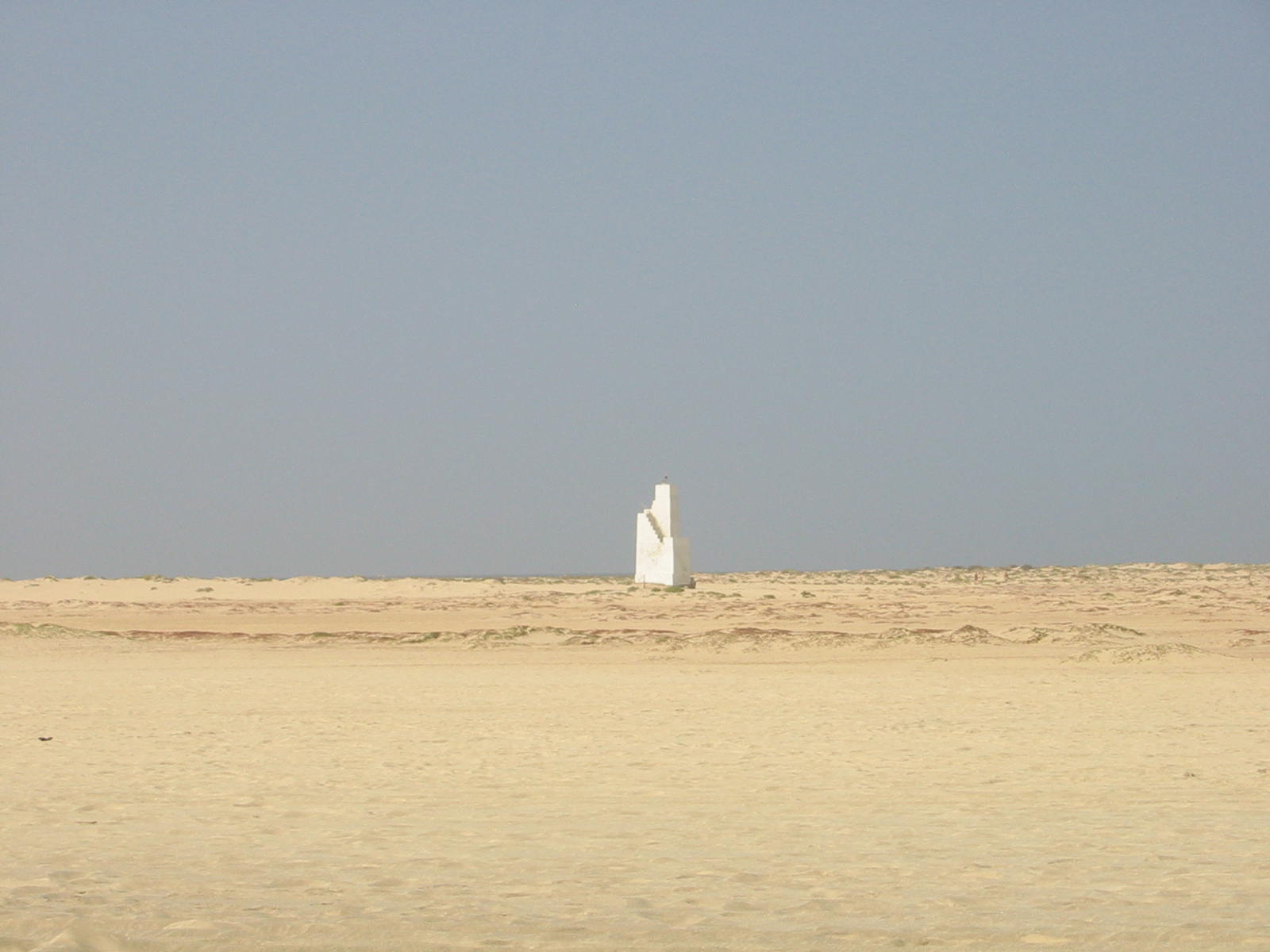
- The lighthouse and the headland facing about southwest and the point

- Coordinates: 16°35′06″N 22°55′16″W
- Location: Southern Sal, Cape Verde near Santa Maria
- Offshore water bodies: Atlantic Ocean

Ponta do Sinó is the southernmost point of the island of Sal in Cape Verde. It lies 2 km southwest of Santa Maria city centre. The area north of the headland is a protected area: nature reserve Ponta do Sinó, at the edge of a large tourism development zone. There is a lighthouse on the headland, Farol da Ponta do Sinó, built in 1892.

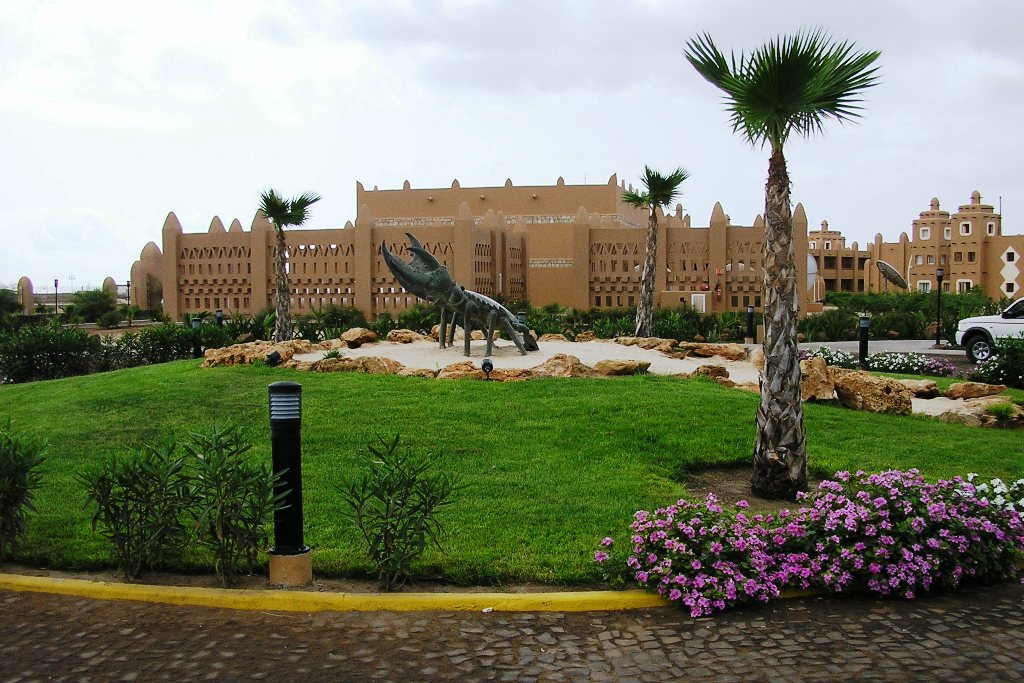
Riu Funana hotel located near Ponta do Sinó

== See also ==
- Tourism in Cape Verde
