= Praia de Cabral =

Beach in Cape Verde

- Beach
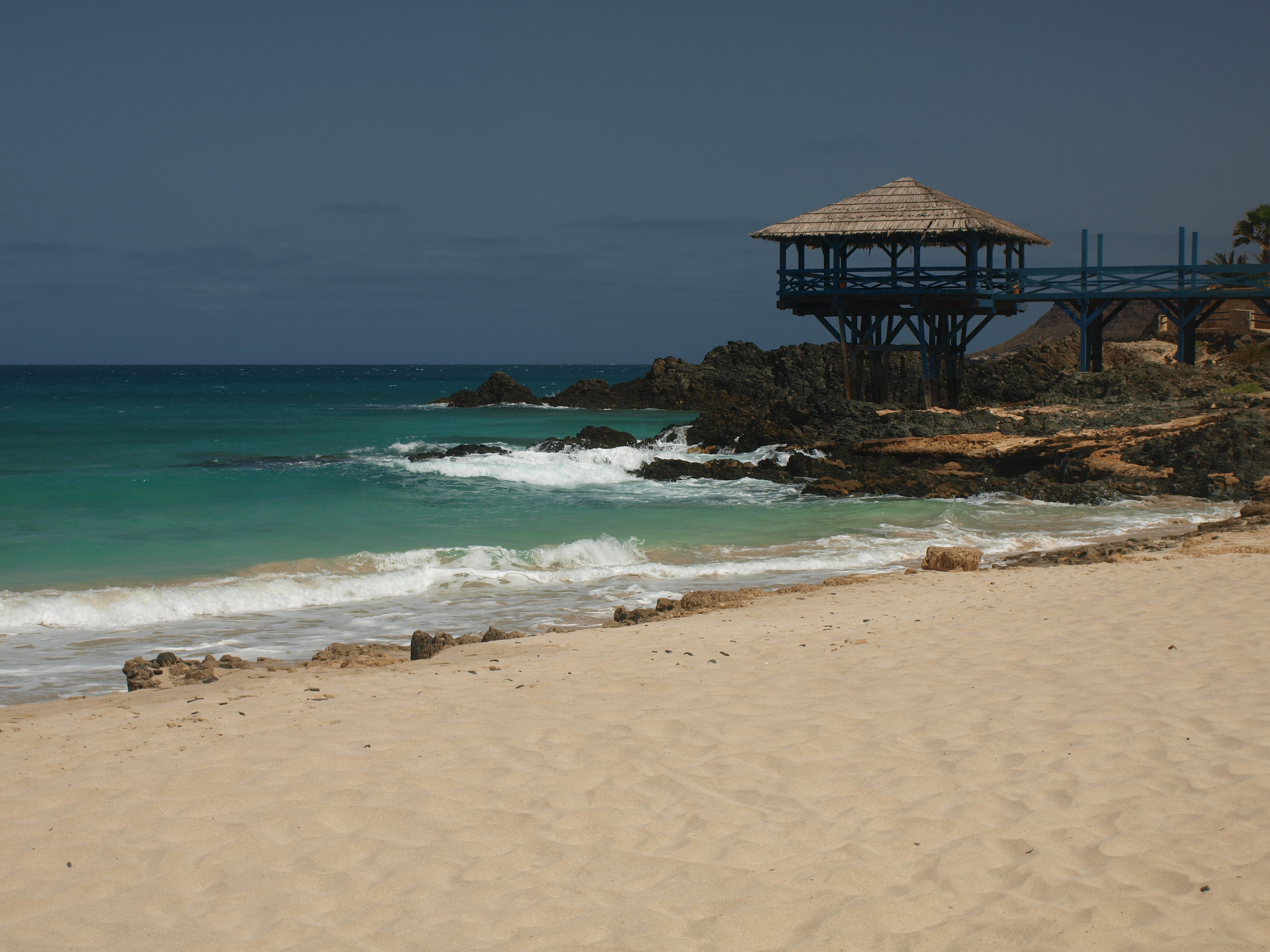
- Praia de Cabral and its land pier
- Interactive map of Praia de Cabral
- Coordinates: 16.185°N 22.918°W
- Location: Northwestern Boa Vista, Cape Verde near Sal Rei

Dimensions
  - Length: 2 km
- Access: road

Praia de Cabral is a beach on the northwest coast of the island of Boa Vista in Cape Verde in the immediate area of the town of Sal Rei. Nearby in Praia de Fátima is an abandoned chapel of Our Lady of Fatima.

== See also ==
- Tourism in Cape Verde
