= Boca de Lapa =

Beach in São Vicente, Cape Verde

- Beach
- Location within Cape Verde
- Coordinates: 16.812°N 24.871°W
- Location: Southeastern São Vicente, Cape Verde
- Access: track

Boca de Lapa is a beach in the southeast of the island of São Vicente, Cape Verde. The waves are strong at this beach, which makes it popular with surfers, who call it "Sandy Beach". It is only accessible by dirt road. It is 4.5 km south of Calhau.
