= Praia d'Aranhas =

Beach in Cape Verde

- Beach
- Location within Cape Verde
- Coordinates: 17.176°N 25.149°W
- Location: Northern Santo Antão, Cape Verde

Dimensions
  - Length: 150 m (490 ft)
- Access: road

Praia d'Aranhas is a beach on the northern coast of the island of Santo Antão in Cape Verde and is part of the municipality of Ribeira Grande and the village of Fontainhas. It lies east of the village of Cruzinha close to its limits and west of Ponta do Sol.

It also has a subdivision and a small stream located.

Another nearby subdivision is Aranhas de Cima.
