= Praia dos Flamengos =

Cape Verdian beach

- Beach
- Location within Cape Verde
- Coordinates: 16.807°N 25.045°W
- Location: Southwestern São Vicente, Cape Verde
- Access: dirt road

Praia dos Flamengos (also: Praia de Flamengo) is a beach in the southwest of the island of São Vicente in Cape Verde. It is 2.5 km southeast of the village São Pedro and 11 km southwest of Mindelo. It is accessible from the northeast by a dirt road.
