= Praia de Santa Mónica =

Beach in Cape Verde

- Beach
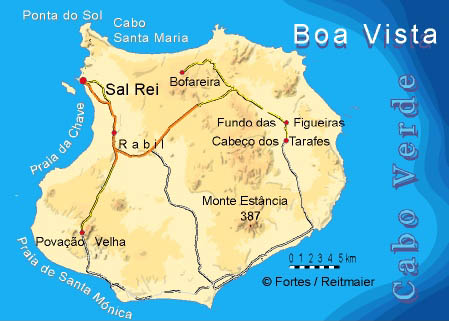
- Praia de Santa Mónica, its location is in the southwest of the island
- Interactive map of Praia de Santa Mónica
- Coordinates: 15°58′40″N 22°49′55″W
- Location: Southwestern Boa Vista, Cape Verde
- Access: road

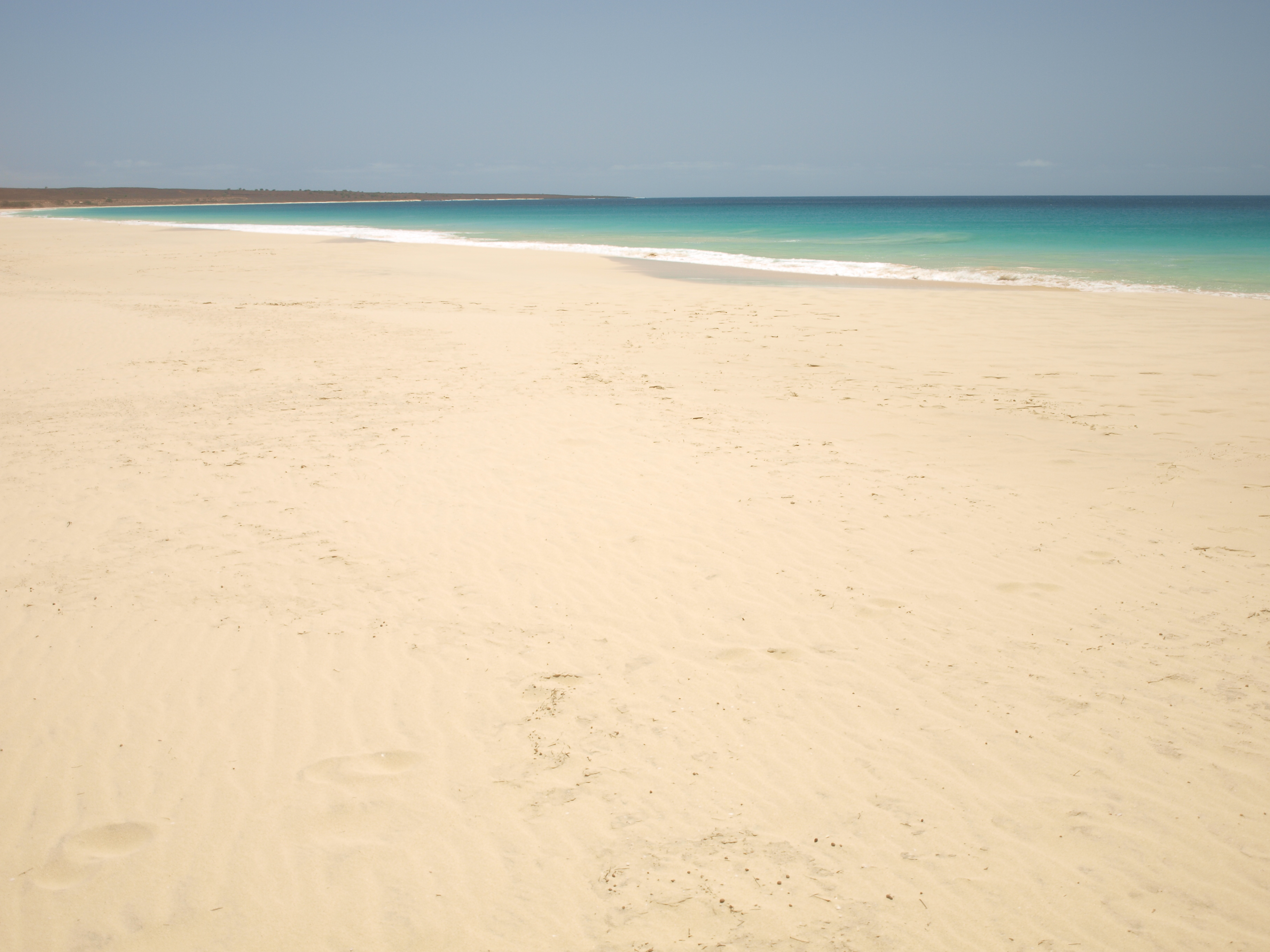
Praia de Santa Mónica

Praia de Santa Mónica (Portuguese meaning "beach of Saint Monica") is a sandy beach in the southwestern part of the island of Boa Vista in Cape Verde. The nearest village is Povoação Velha, 5 km to the north. The beach is adjacent to the protected area Morro de Areia Nature Reserve, which is important for endemic birds and turtles. Praia de Santa Mónica is part of a tourism development zone.

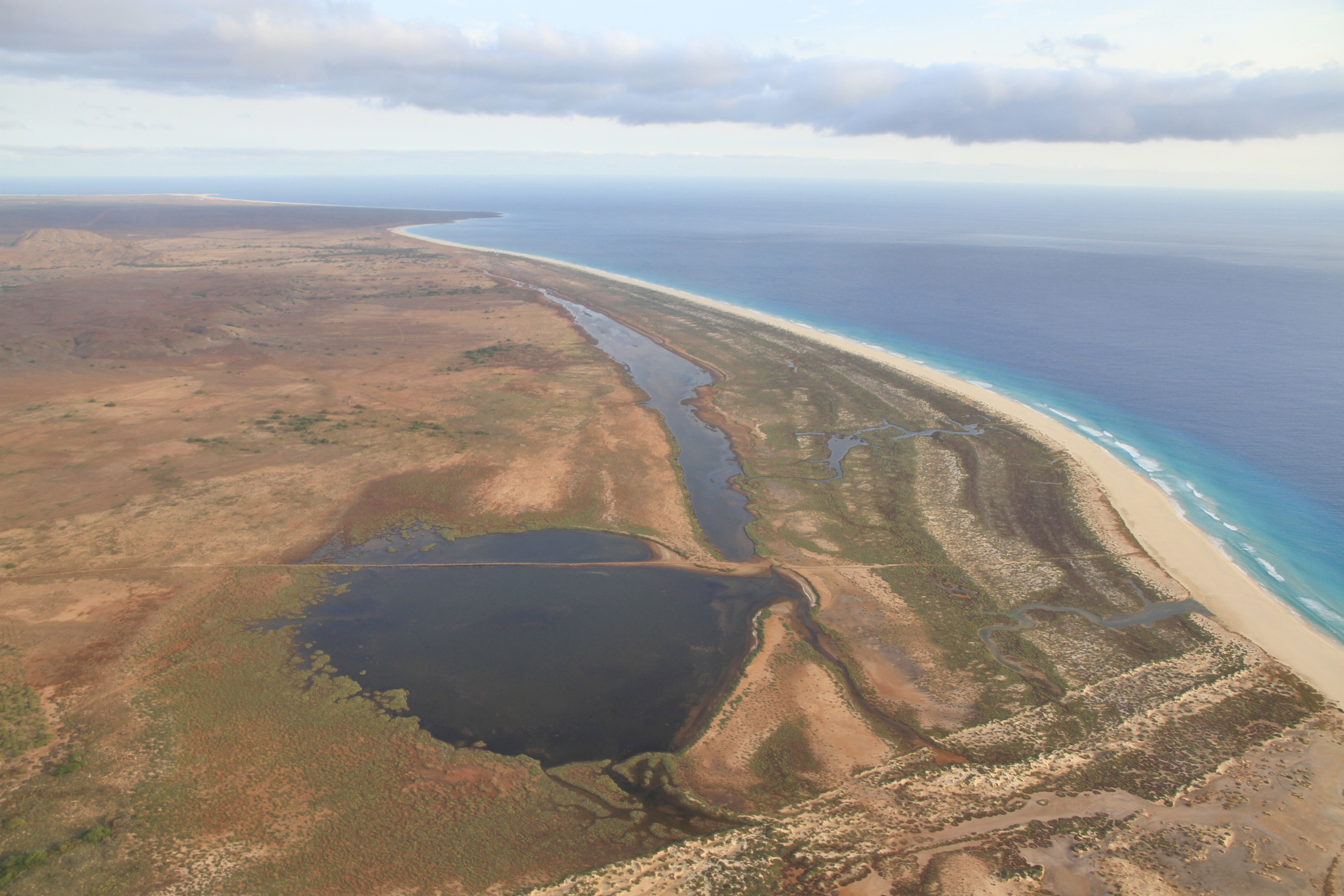
Panoramic view of Praias de Curralinho and de Santa Mónica
