= Santa Maria, Cape Verde =

Santa Maria
- Settlement
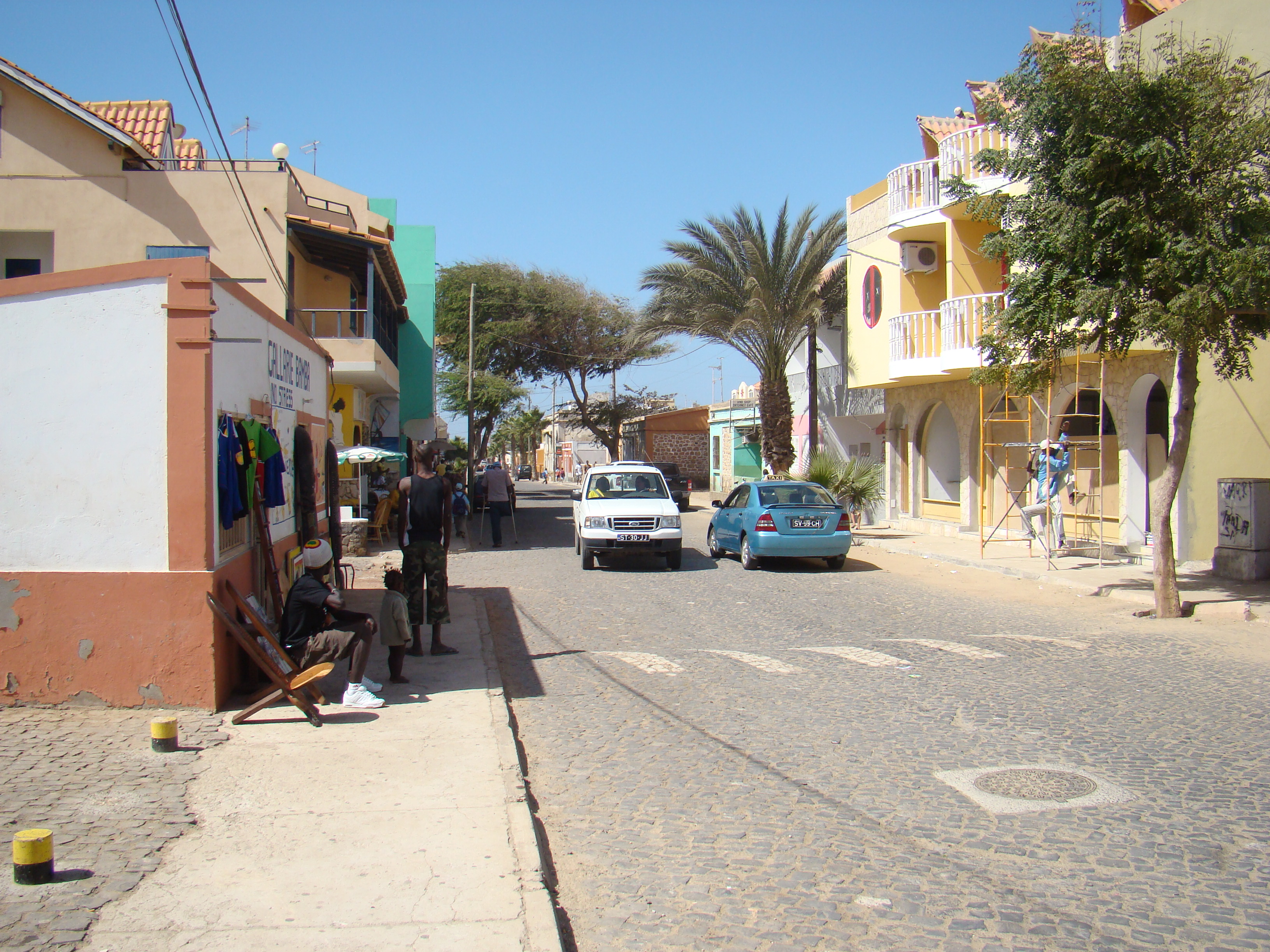
- Typical street in Santa Maria

- Location within Cape Verde
- Coordinates: 16.599°N 22.904°W
- Country: Cape Verde
- Island: Sal
- Municipality: Sal
- Civil parish: Nossa Senhora das Dores
- Elevation: 12 m (39 ft)

Population (2010)
  - Total: 6,258
- ID: 41104

Santa Maria (Portuguese for Saint Mary) is a city in the southern part of the island municipality of Sal, Cape Verde. It is located on the south coast, about 16 km south of the Amílcar Cabral International Airport, and 20 km south of the island capital Espargos.

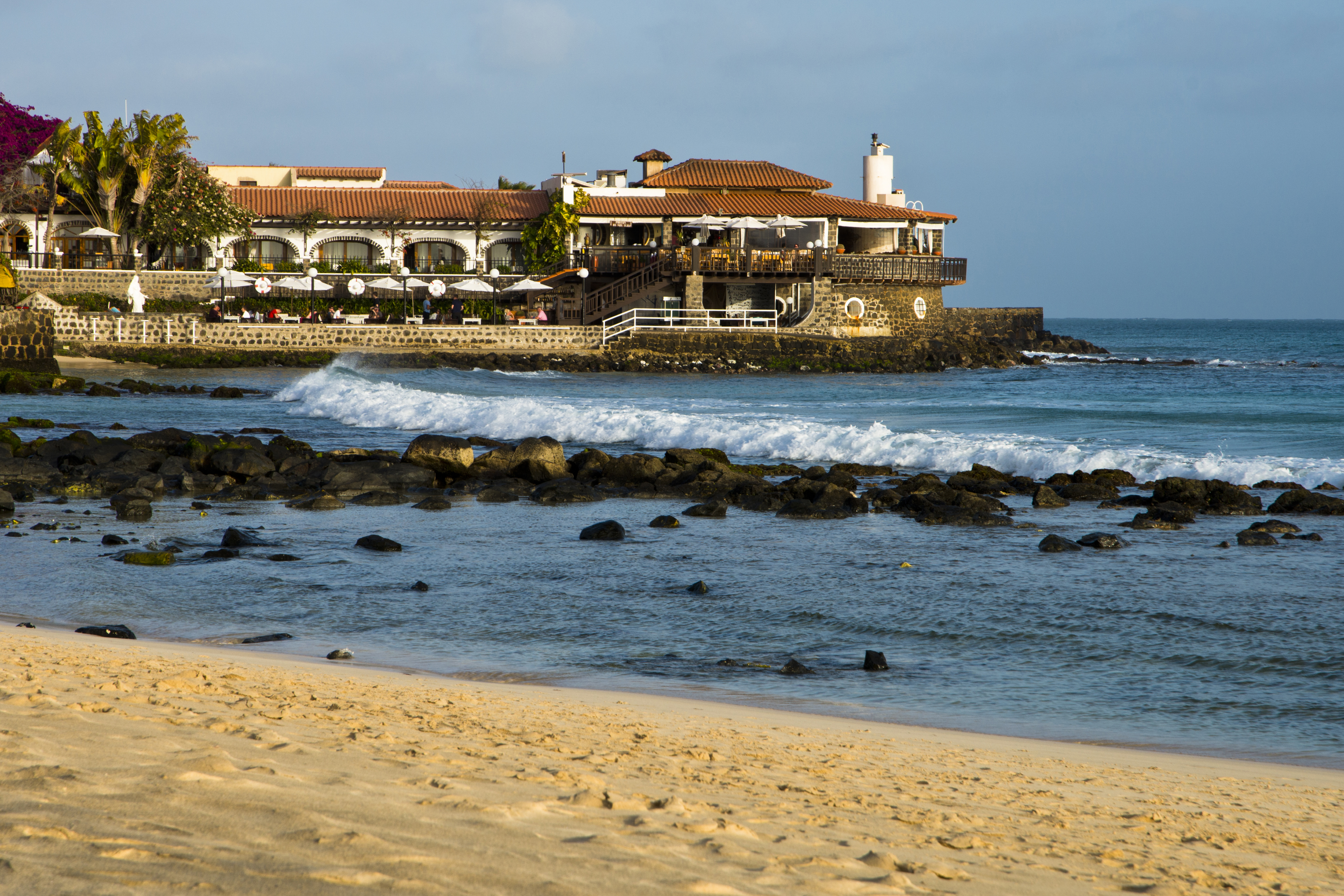
Beach in Santa Maria

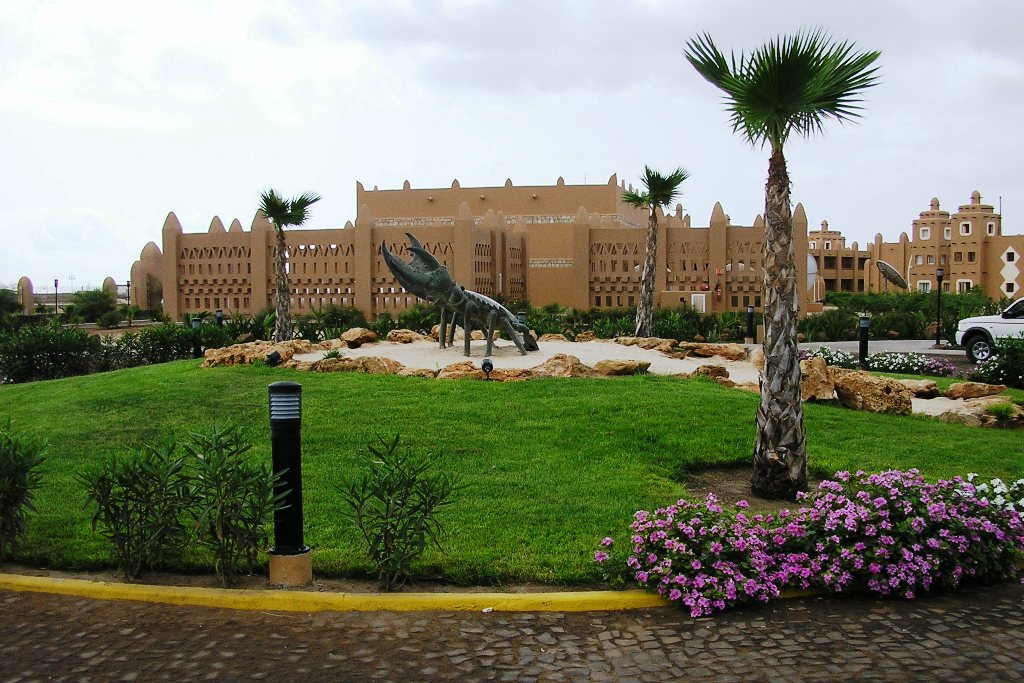
Hotel Garupa, one of several villas in the west of Santa Maria

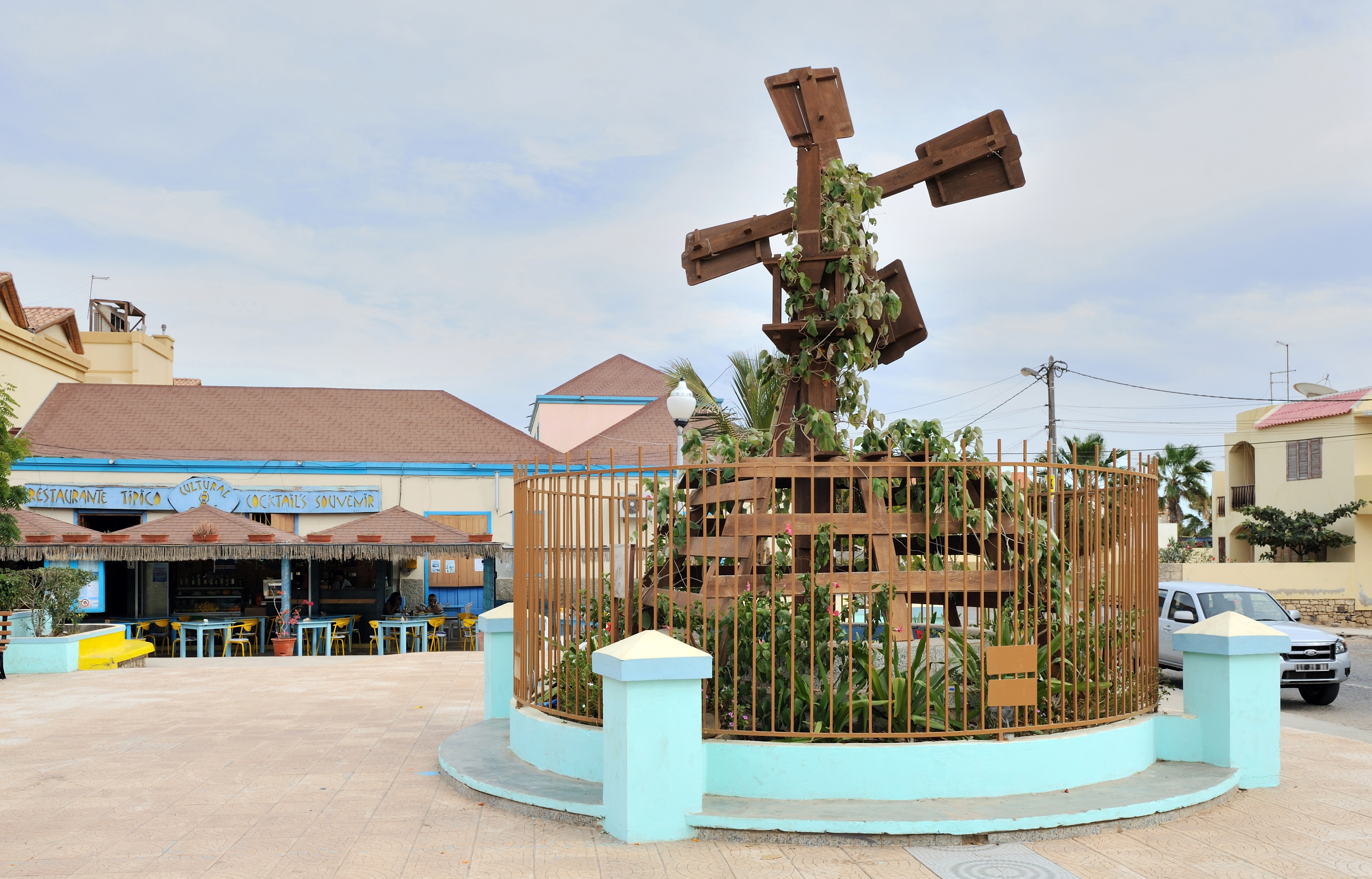
The city square of the city named (Praça) Marcelo Leitão

== History ==
Santa Maria was founded in 1830 for the production of salt. Up to 30,000 tons of salt were shipped from Santa Maria each year. A pier was built in the area of Ponta de Vera Cruz and a small rail track was built to carry the salt to the pier. Most of the product was exported to Brazil, which was halted in 1887 when Brazil imposed a high tax on imported salt to protect its own salt production. The town went into a deep decline, only to recover in 1920 when a Portuguese investor resumed salt production. This continued until 1984. In 1935, Santa Maria was elevated from a village to a town.

In 1967, Belgian industrialists and engineers Georges Vynckier and Marguerite Massart opened Cape Verde's first resort hotel named Morabeza. After 1986, tourism became an important industry on the island, and many resorts and hotels were built in the southern and southwestern coastal areas near Santa Maria. In 2017, 48.2% of the country's available beds were on the island of Sal.

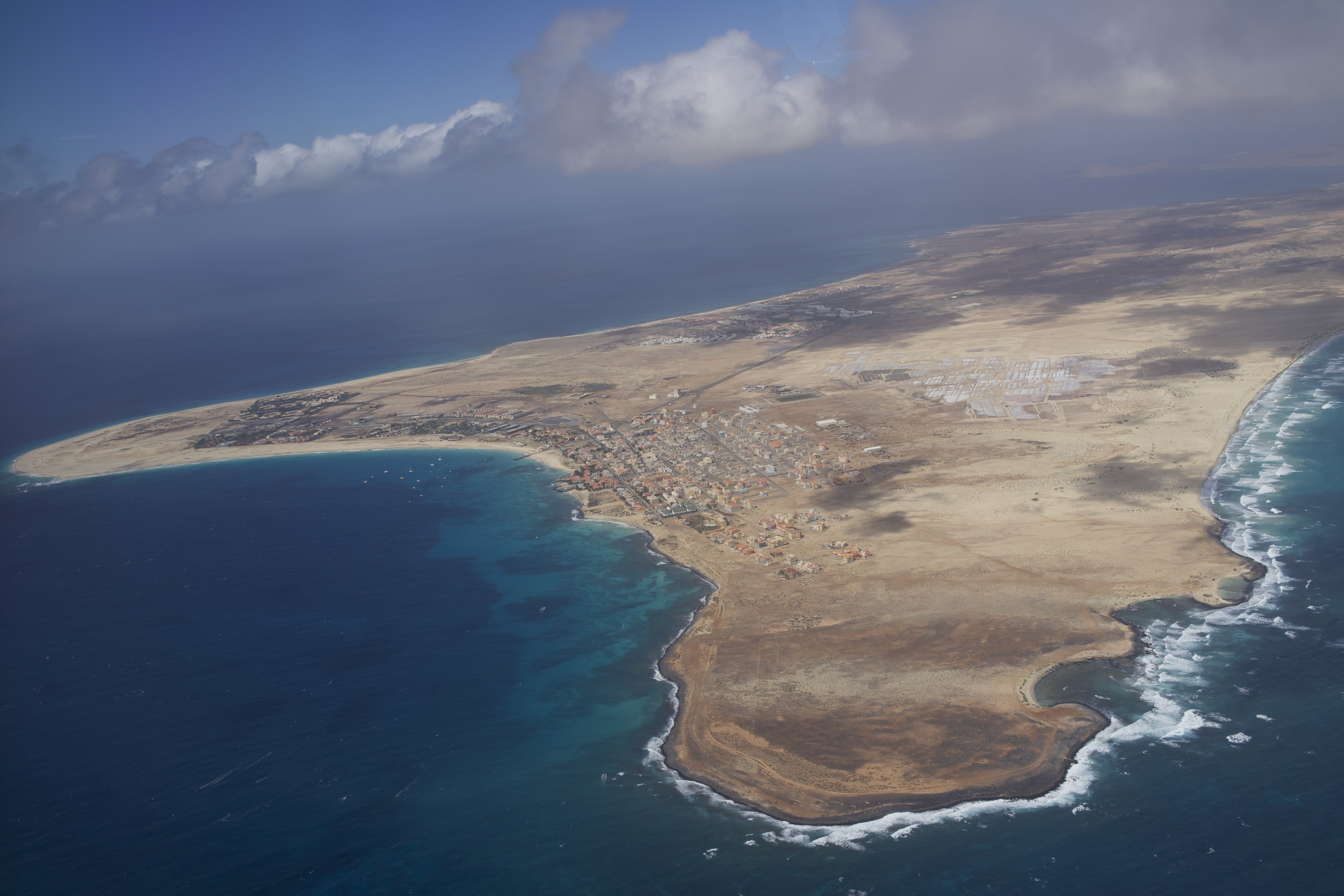
Aerial view of Santa Maria and the surrounding area

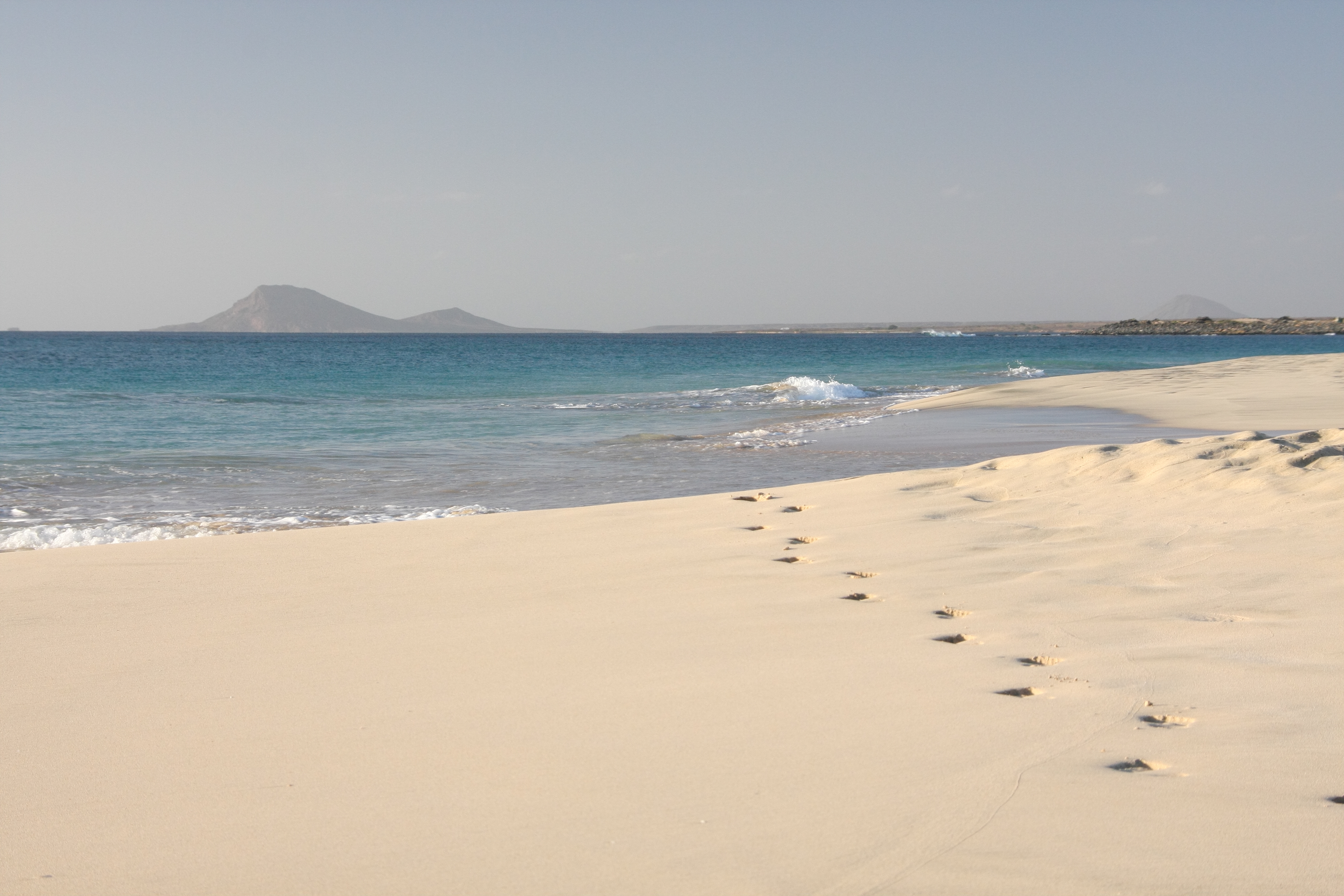
Beach near Santa Maria

== Historical population ==
Year	Population
1990 (Census)	1,343
2000 (Census)	about 2,500
2010 (Census)	6,258

== Points of interest ==
- Praça Marcelo Leitão, the city's main square
- Praia de Santa Maria, beach
- Ponta de Vera Cruz, lighthouse
- Santa Maria Saltpans, a protected landscape

== Climate ==
Santa Maria has an arid climate, though substantially milder than for example, the Sahara, because of ocean moderation - the highest mean temperature is in September with 27°C and its lowest is in January with 22°C.

Annual rainfall is very minimal at 76 mm, the wettest is 33 mm in September and the driest are 0 mm from the months of March to June. Its total average of rainy days is only three. Water temperature ranges from 23 in winter months to 26 in summer and fall months. Humidity ranges from 70% in January, 75% during the summer months and in October to 77% in September.

Climate data for Sal Island
Month	Jan	Feb	Mar	Apr	May	Jun	Jul	Aug	Sep	Oct	Nov	Dec	Year
Mean daily maximum °C (°F)	24.0 (75.2)	24.1 (75.4)	24.8 (76.6)	24.8 (76.6)	25.3 (77.5)	26.0 (78.8)	27.2 (81.0)	28.8 (83.8)	29.3 (84.7)	28.6 (83.5)	27.3 (81.1)	25.2 (77.4)	26.3 (79.3)
Daily mean °C (°F)	21.4 (70.5)	21.1 (70.0)	21.6 (70.9)	21.9 (71.4)	22.5 (72.5)	23.4 (74.1)	24.6 (76.3)	26.0 (78.8)	26.6 (79.9)	26.1 (79.0)	24.5 (76.1)	22.7 (72.9)	23.5 (74.3)
Average precipitation mm (inches)	5.3 (0.21)	3.8 (0.15)	1.3 (0.05)	0.0 (0.0)	0.0 (0.0)	0.0 (0.0)	0.8 (0.03)	14.1 (0.56)	33.6 (1.32)	6.5 (0.26)	2.5 (0.10)	1.6 (0.06)	69.5 (2.74)
Average precipitation days (≥ 0.1 mm)	1	1	1	0	0	0	0	2	3	1	1	0	1
Average relative humidity (%)	70	71	71	73	75	75	75	77	75	73	71	73	73.1
Source: NCEI

== Notable people ==
- Miguel Dias, boxer, immigrated to the Netherlands and played for the Dutch team
- Rodirlei José Ascensão Duarte (better known as Rody), footballer
- Manuel Antonio Martins, founder of Santa Maria, colonial governor
- Ruben Sança, athlete

== See also ==
- List of cities in Cape Verde
- Tourism in Cape Verde
