= Tourism in Cape Verde =

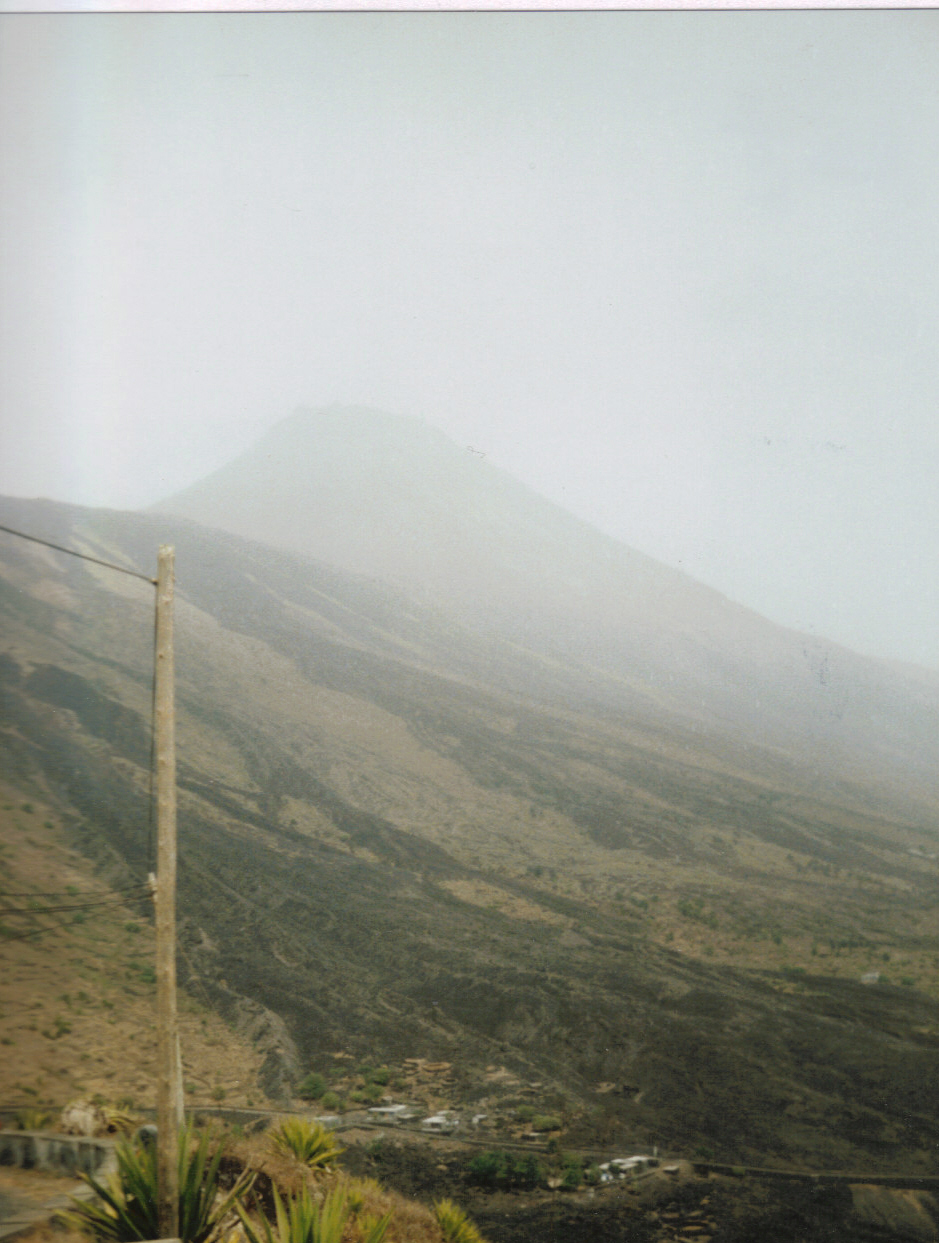
Ecotourism is developing around the volcano Pico do Fogo on Fogo.

Tourism in Cape Verde, a group of islands off the coast of Senegal, West Africa, started in the 1970s on the island of Sal and increased slowly in the 1980s and 1990s.

== Overview ==
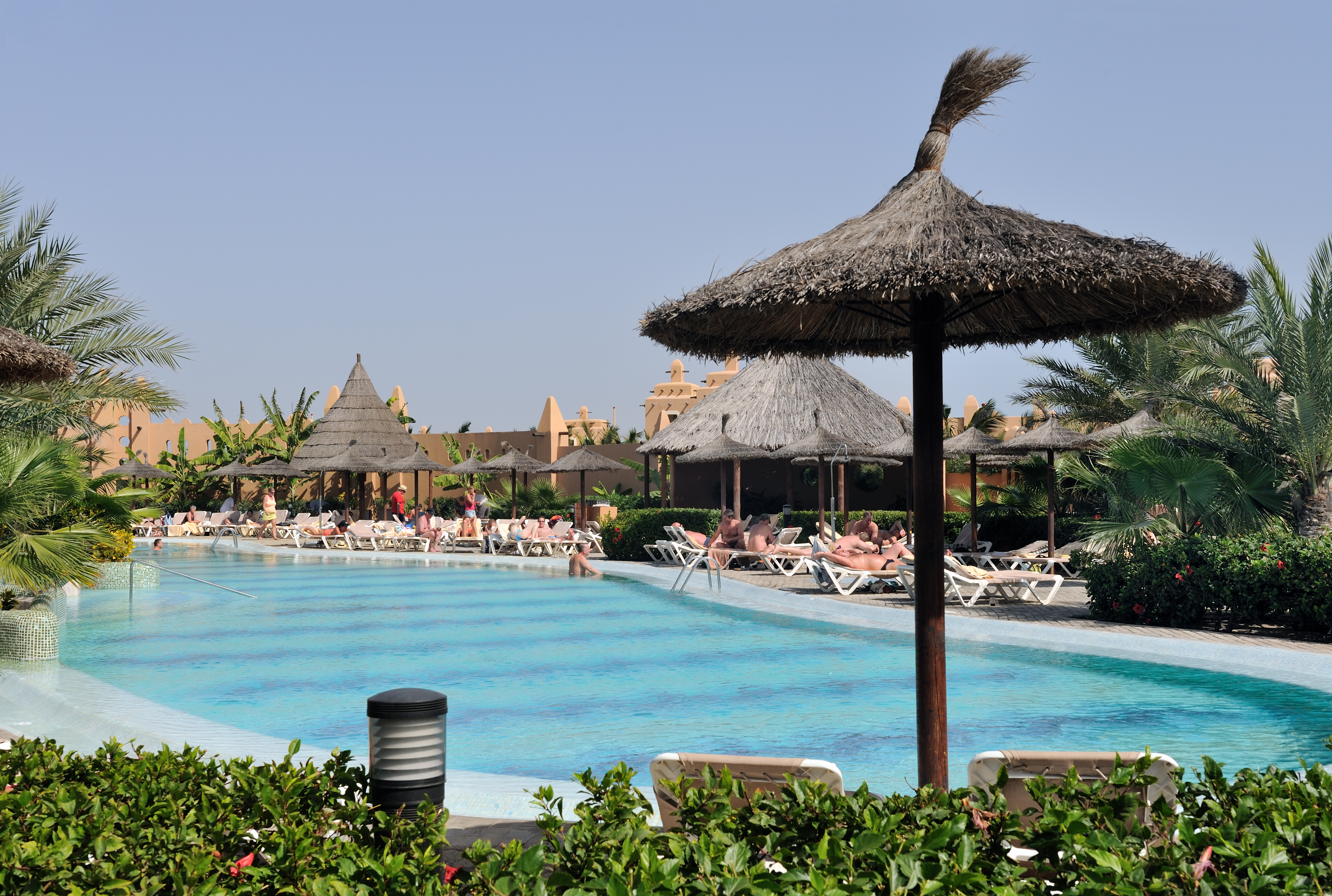
A resort in Sal

Tourism contributed US$41 million to the country's economy in the year 2000. The hotel industry contributed 2.0% to GDP in 1997, which increased to 6.8% in 2001 and 25%-30% in 2026. The number of tourists increased from approximately 45,000 in 1997 to more than 115,000 in 2001 and to over 765,000 in 2018 according to the Cape Verdean statistics bureau. Most of these international arrivals came from the United Kingdom (23.6%), Germany (11.2%), the Low Countries (i.e., The Netherlands and Belgium), France, Portugal, Italy, and other countries. Less than one percent of tourists came from the United States. The vast majority of tourists visit the comparatively flat and less populated islands of Sal, Boa Vista, and Maio with their white sandy beaches.

The islands of Cape Verde have a pleasant climate during most of the year with 350 days of sunshine, and some of them offer an impressive mountain scenery as well. Diving, windsurfing, sailing and trekking are available to tourists. Some ecotourism is developing on the islands of São Nicolau, Santiago and Boa Vista. For tourists interested in cultural topics, the town of Cidade Velha on the island of Santiago was declared a World Heritage Site by UNESCO in 1997, but cultural tourism has not been particularly promoted up to now.

The visa policy of Cape Verde requires visas for tourists from most of the world. A visa exemption for European Union citizens, citizens of the United States and Canada, and citizens of European countries outside the Schengen Area, has been implemented and took effect on 1 January 2019.

== Statistics ==
Most guests in tourist accommodation establishments, by country of residence, in 2015:

Rank	Country	Number
1	United Kingdom	126,685
2	Germany	76,451
3	Portugal	61,979
4	Belgium; Netherlands	60,473
5	France	56,458
6	Italy	27,086
7	Spain	9,412
8	Switzerland	5,450
9	United States	4,282
10	Austria	2,351
11	South Africa	232
	Other countries	88,863
	Total foreign	569,387

== Bibliography ==
- Berlitz Pocket Guide Cape Verde (3rd. revised ed.). Berlitz Publishing. 2018. ISBN 978-1785730627.
