= List of protected areas in Cape Verde =

This is a list of protected areas in Cape Verde:

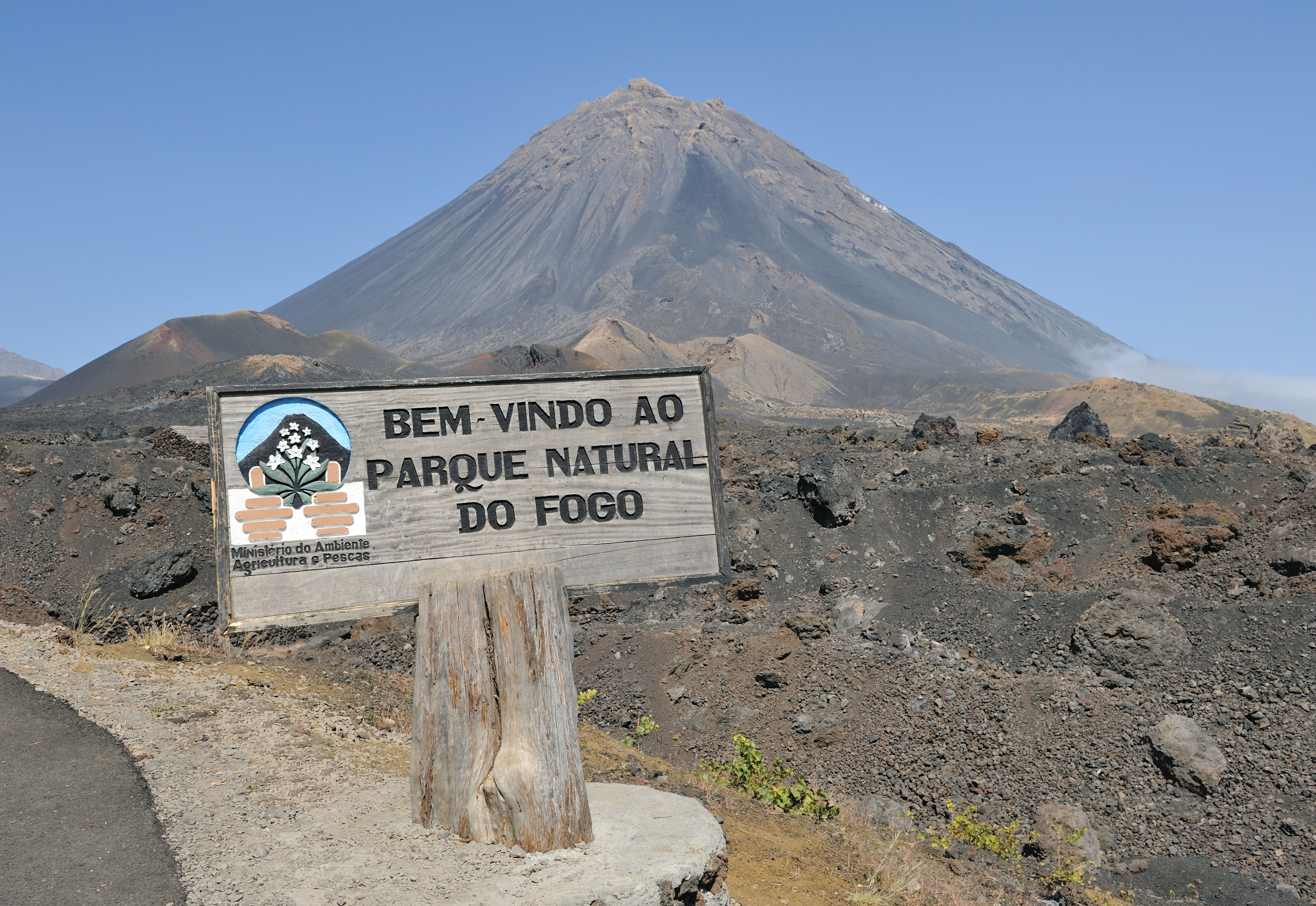
Pico do Fogo and Fogo Natural Park

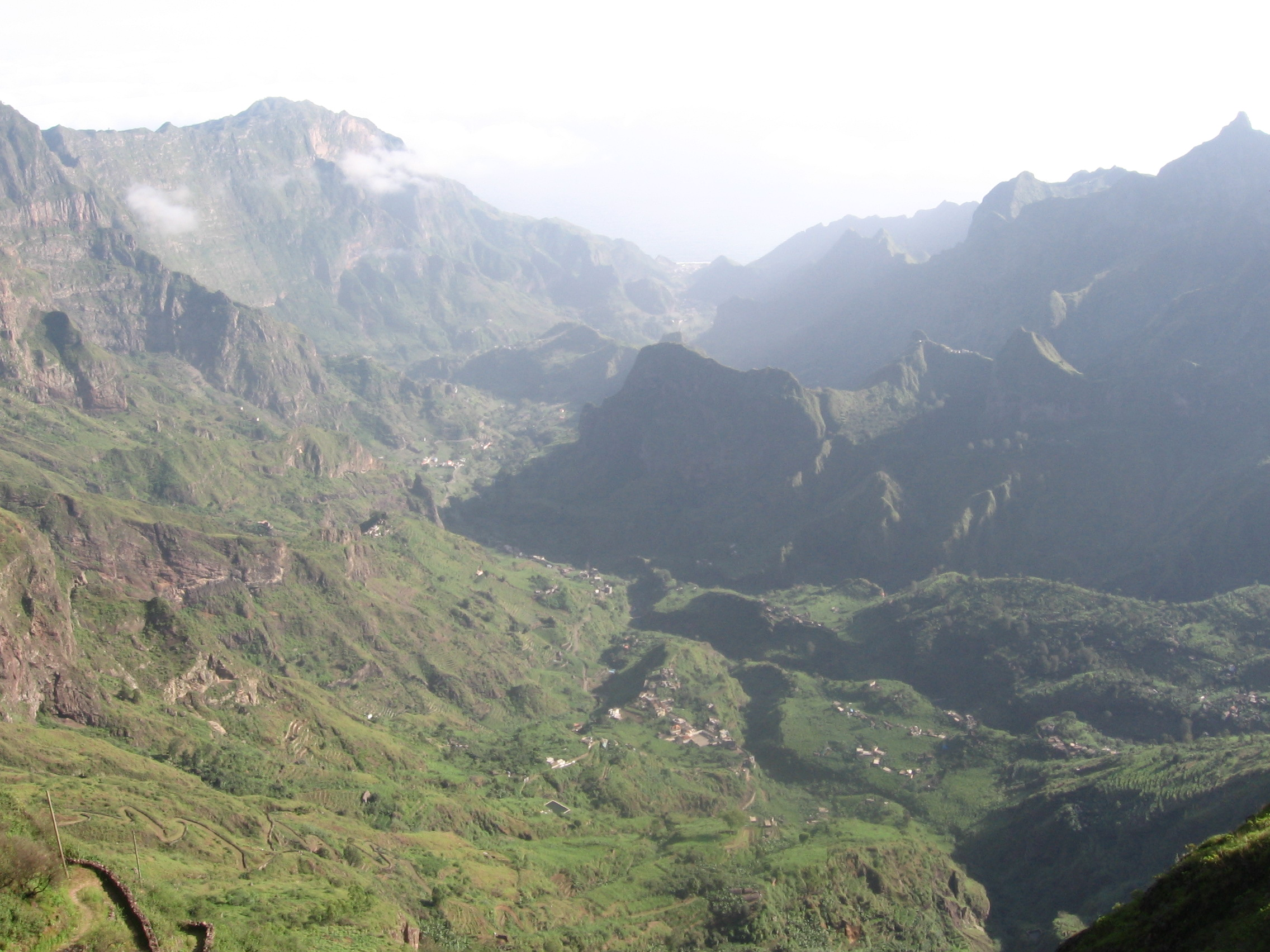
Paul Valley in Cova-Ribeira da Torre-Paul Natural Park, Santo Antão

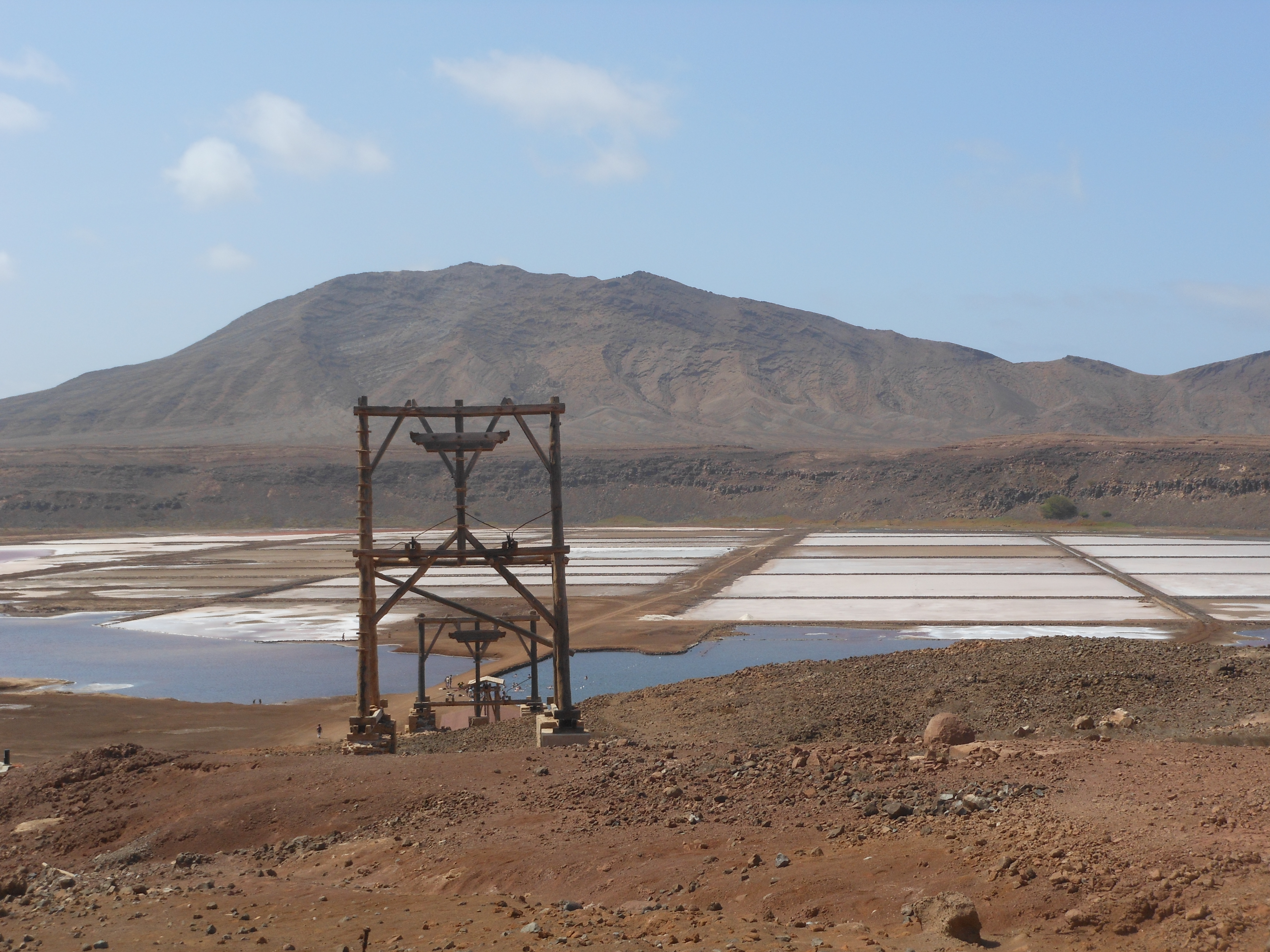
Pedra de Lume Saltpans, Sal

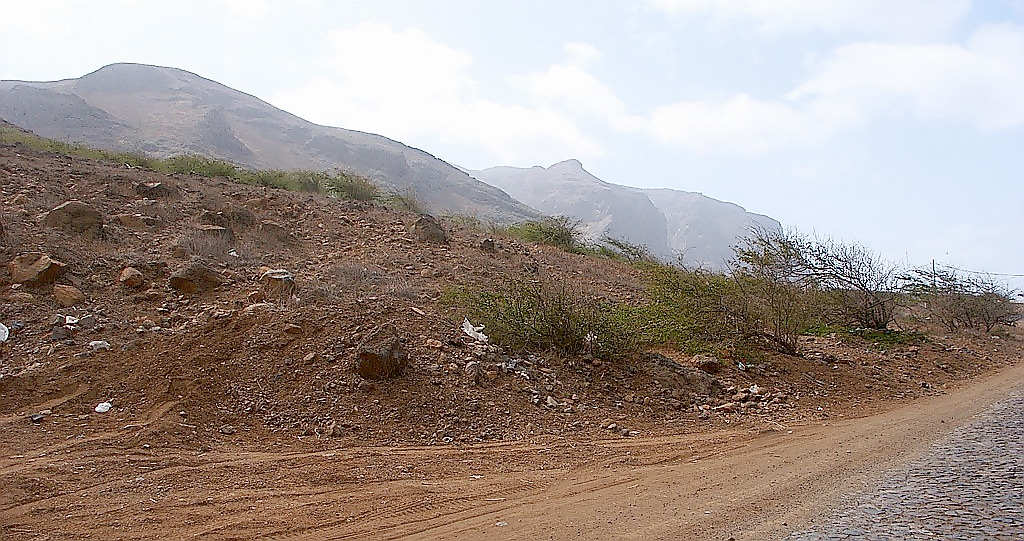
Monte Gordo, São Nicolau

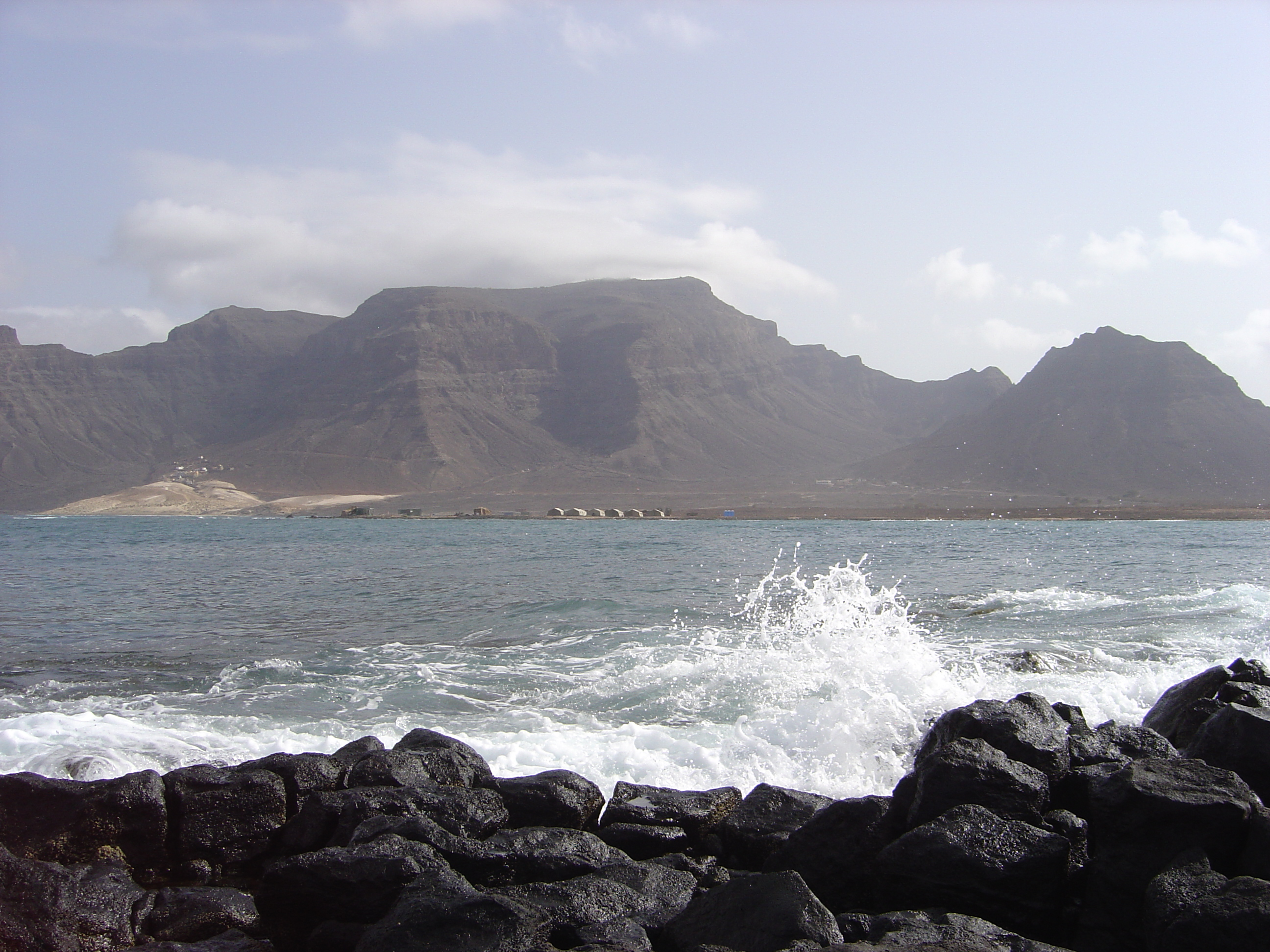
Monte Verde, São Vicente

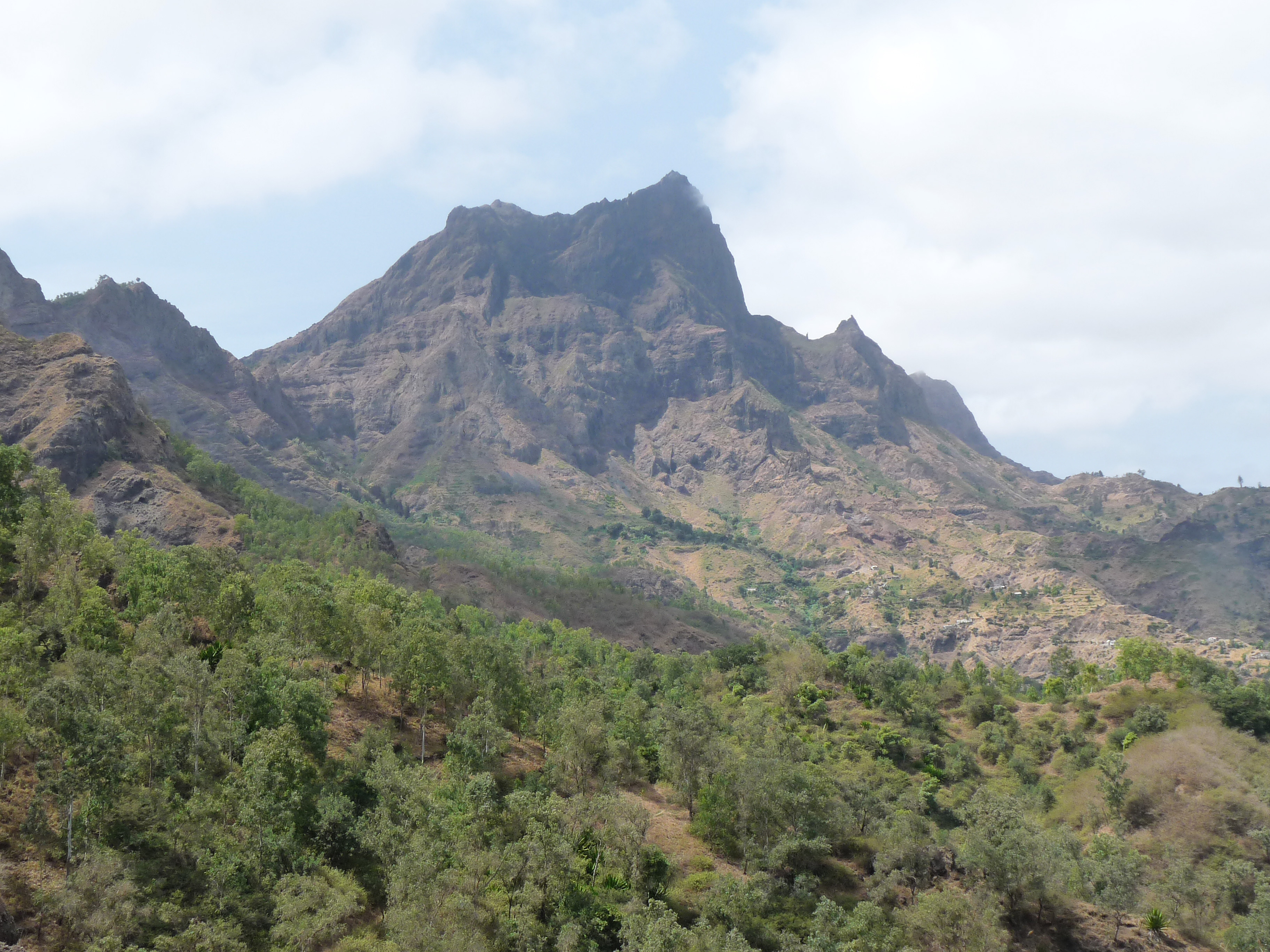
Pico de Antónia, Santiago

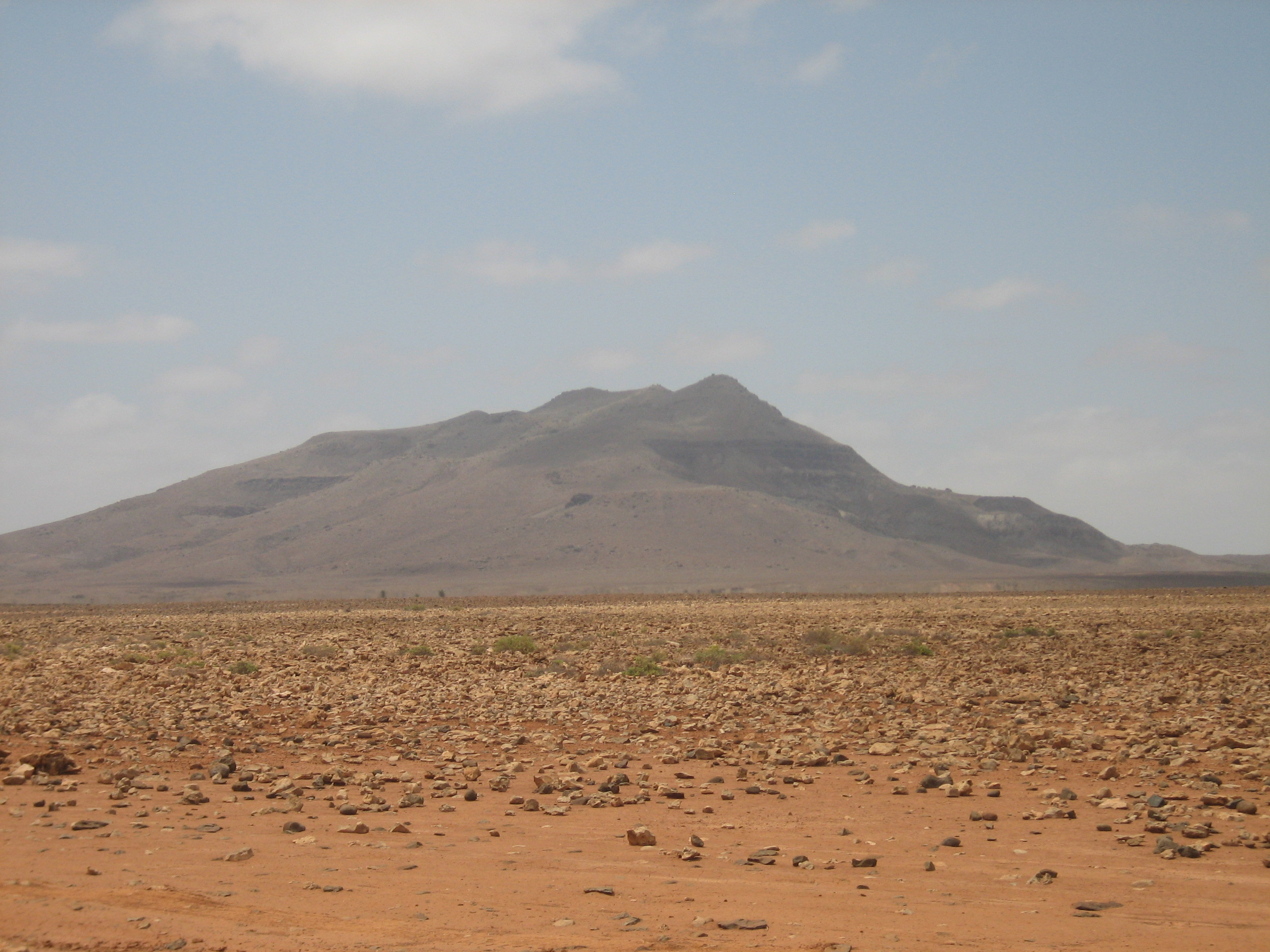
Monte Estância, Boa Vista

== Integral Nature Reserves ==
- Santa Luzia and the islets of Ilhéu Raso and Ilhéu Branco
- Ilhéu de Baluarte, Boa Vista
- Ilhéu de Curral Velho, Boa Vista
- Ilhéu dos Pássaros, Boa Vista
- Ilhéus do Rombo, northeast of Brava

== Nature Reserves ==
- Cruzinha, Santo Antão
- Monte do Alto das Cabaças, São Nicolau
- Costa da Fragata, Sal
- Ponta do Sinó, Sal
- Rabo de Junco, Sal
- Serra Negra, Sal
- Baía da Murdeira, Sal
- Boa Esperança, Boa Vista
- Morro de Areia, Boa Vista
- Ponta do Sol, Boa Vista
- Tartaruga, Boa Vista
- Casas Velhas, Maio
- Lagoa Cimidor, Maio
- Praia do Morro, Maio
- Terras Salgadas, Maio

== Natural Parks ==
- Barreiro-Figueira, Maio
- Cova-Paul-Ribeira da Torre, Santo Antão
- Fogo Natural Park
- Monte Gordo, São Nicolau
- Monte Verde, São Vicente
- Moroços, Santo Antão
- Norte, Boa Vista
- Serra do Pico de Antónia, Santiago
- Serra Malagueta, Santiago
- Tope de Coroa, Santo Antão

== Natural Monuments ==
- Morrinho de Açúcar, Sal
- Morrinho do Filho, Sal
- Monte Estância, Boa Vista
- Monte Santo António, Boa Vista
- Rocha Estância, Boa Vista
- Ilhéu de Sal Rei, Boa Vista

== Protected Landscapes ==
- Pombas, Santo Antão
- Monte Grande, Sal
- Buracona-Ragona, Sal
- Pedra de Lume salt ponds and Cagarral, Sal
- Santa Maria salt ponds, Sal
- Monte Caçador and Pico Forcado, Boa Vista
- Curral Velho, Boa Vista
- Monte Penoso and Monte Branco, Maio
- Monte Santo António, Maio
- Salinas of the English Port, Maio

== Ramsar wetlands ==
- Lagoa do Rabil, Boa Vista
- Pedra Badejo lagoons, Santiago
- Ilhéu de Curral Velho and adjacent coast, Boa Vista
- Salinas of the English Port, Maio

== Important Bird Area ==
- Central mountain range of São Nicolau
- Coastal cliffs between Porto Mosquito and Baia do Inferno, Santiago
- Fogo Volcanic Important Bird Area
- Ilhéu Branco, east of Santa Luzia
- Ilhéu Raso, east of Santa Luzia
- Ilhéu de Curral Velho and adjacent coast, Boa Vista
- Kapok tree, Boa Entrada, Santiago
- Mahoganies at Banana, Ribeira Montanha, Santiago
- Pedra Badejo lagoons, Santiago
- Ribeira do Rabil, Boa Vista
- Serra do Pico da Antónia, Santiago

== See also ==
- Protected areas
- Geography of Cape Verde
- List of mountains in Cape Verde
- Jardim Botânico Nacional Grandvaux Barbosa, founded in 1986
