= Curral Velho =

Curral Velho may refer to:

- Curral Velho, Paraíba, Brazil
- Curral Velho, Cape Verde, a deserted village on the island of Boa Vista
- Ilhéu de Curral Velho and adjacent coast Important Bird Area, on the island of Boa Vista, Cape Verde
- Curral Velho (Santiago), a settlement on the island of Santiago, Cape Verde
