= Santa Maria salt ponds =

Salt evaporation ponds in Cape Verde

Coordinates: 16.610°N 22.903°W

Salt ponds of Santa Maria
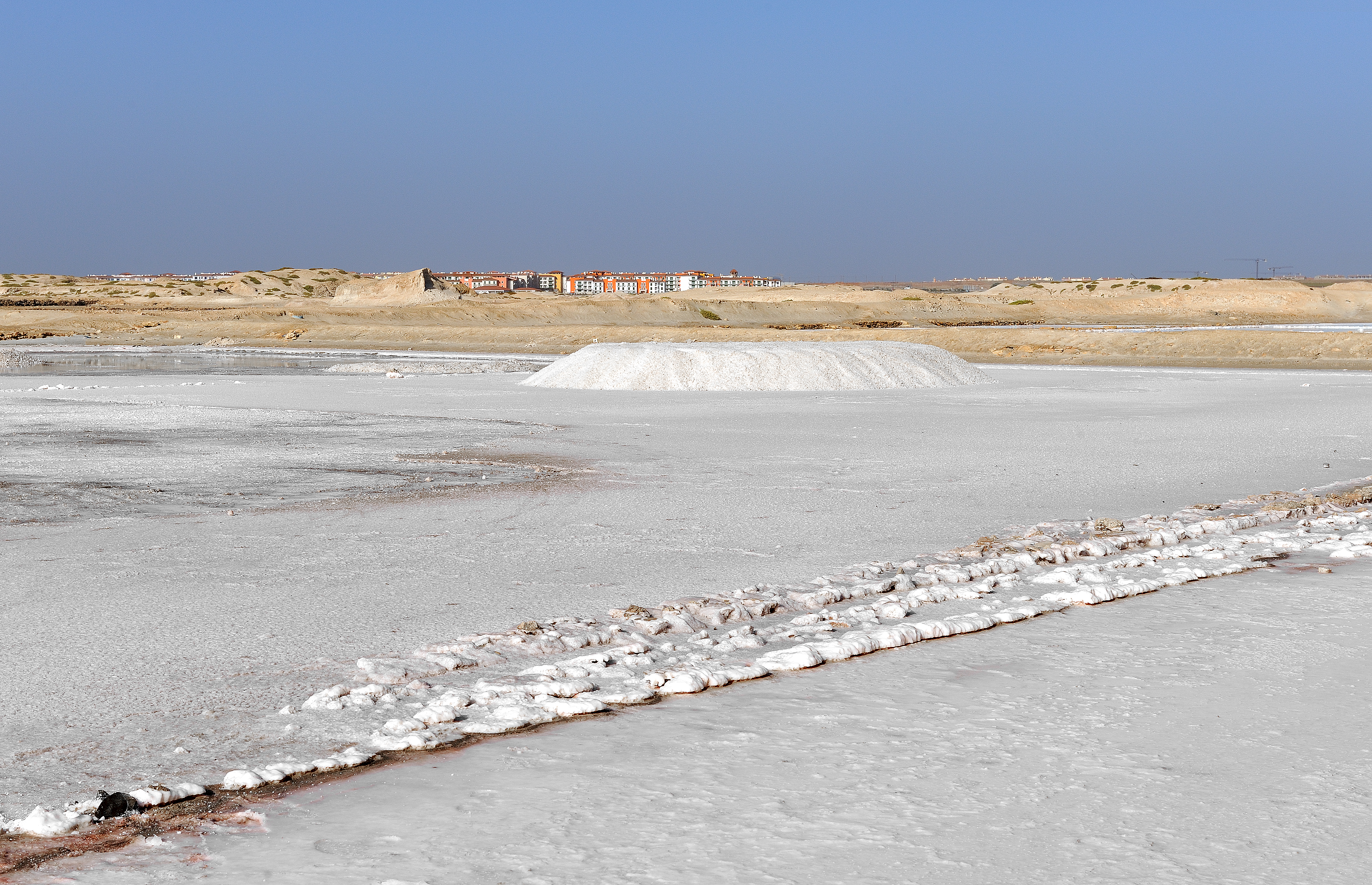
- Saline marsh of Santa Maria
- Interactive map of Salt ponds of Santa Maria
- Location: north of Santa Maria, Sal, Cape Verde
- Area: 69 hectares (170 acres)

The salt ponds of Santa Maria (Portuguese: Salinas de Santa Maria) are a complex of salt evaporation ponds north of the city Santa Maria in the southernmost part of the island of Sal, Cape Verde. It is one of two on the island, the other is near Pedra de Lume. The salt ponds are a protected area as a protected landscape, covering 69 hectares.

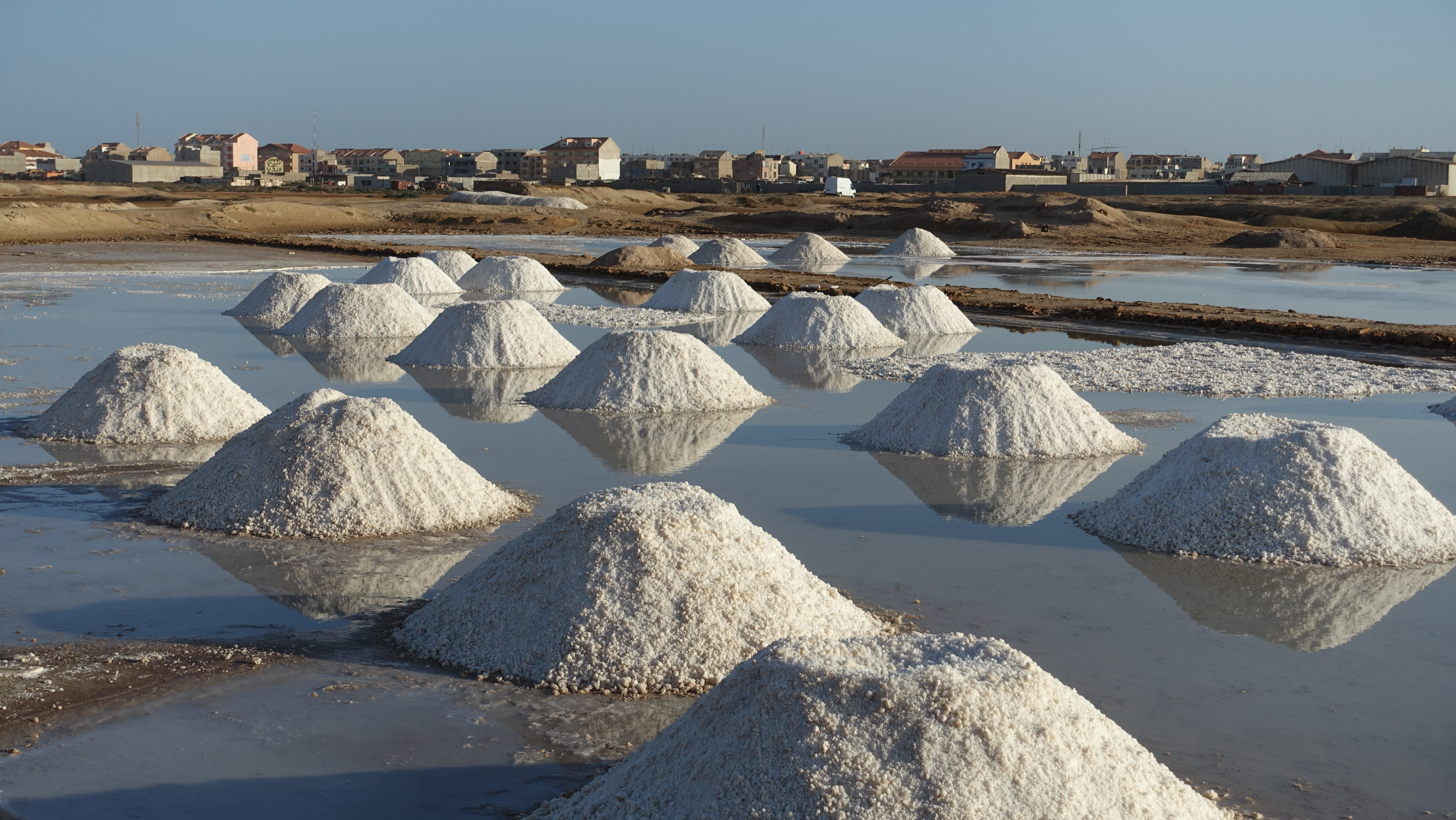
Piles of salt on an evaporation pond north of town

Santa Maria was founded in 1830 for the production of salt. Up to 30,000 tons of salt were shipped from Santa Maria each year. Most of the product was exported to Brazil, which was halted in 1887 when Brazil imposed a high tax on imported salt to protect its own salt production. The town went into a deep decline, only to recover in 1920 when a Portuguese investor resumed salt production. In 1927, salt started to be exported to the Belgian Congo which remained until the nation became independent in 1961 and nationalized its salt production. Salt production started to decline and was ceased in 1984.

== See also ==
- List of protected areas in Cape Verde
