= Terra Boa =

Terra Boa (Portuguese for "good land") may refer to the following places:

- Terra Boa, Paraná, Brazil
- Terra Boa, Cape Verde
