= Buracona =

Bay on Sal Island, Cape Verde

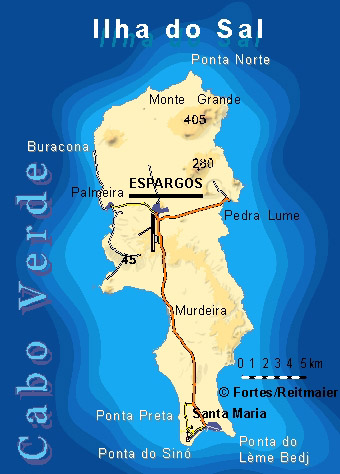
- Buracona, its location is in the northwest of the island

- Location within Cape Verde
- Location: Northwestern Sal, Cape Verde
- Coordinates: 16°47′56″N 22°59′30″W

Buracona is a small bay in the northwest of the island of Sal, Cape Verde. The bay is approximately 5 km north of the village Palmeira. The bay is part of the 5.45 km^{2} (2.10 sq mi) protected landscape of Buracona-Ragona, which covers the coast between Palmeira and Ponta Preta, and the mountain Monte Leste (269 m elevation).

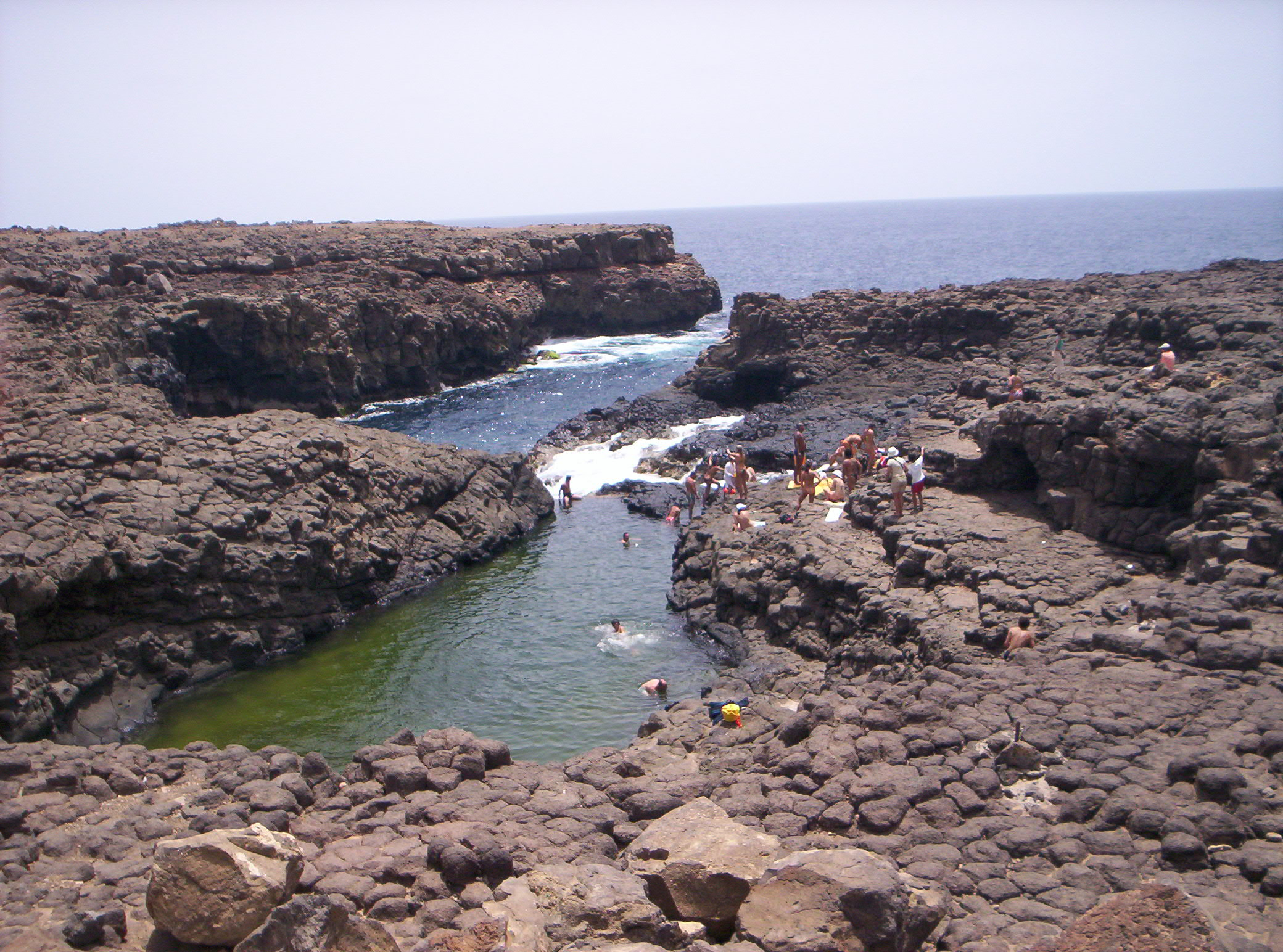
Natural pool of Buracona

== See also ==
- Geography of Cape Verde
- List of protected areas in Cape Verde
