= Ponta da Fragata =

Headland in Cape Verde

- Headland
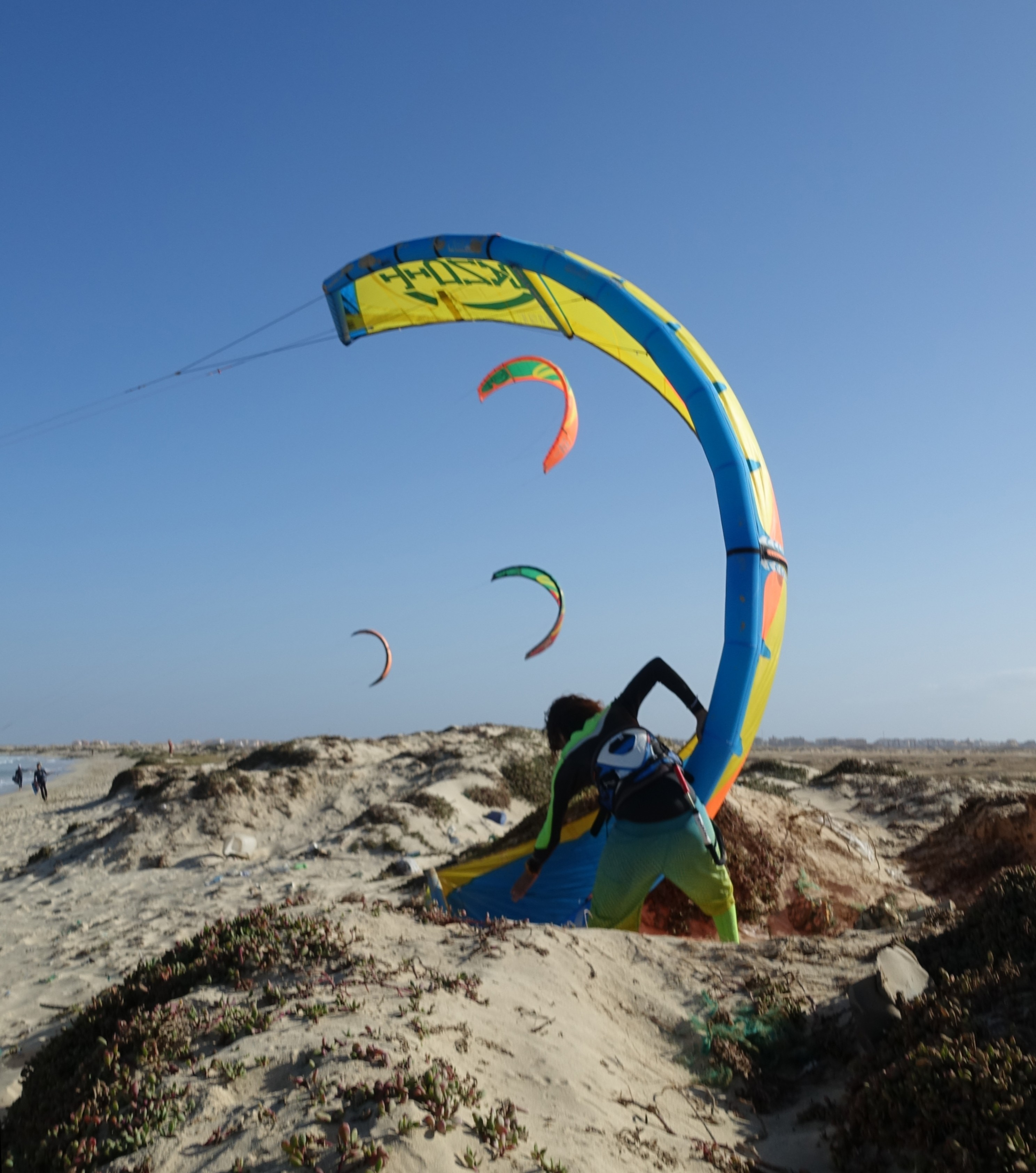

- Location within Cape Verde
- Coordinates: 16°38′42″N 22°53′8″W
- Location: Eastern Sal, Cape Verde
- Water bodies: Atlantic Ocean

Ponta da Fragata (Portuguese meaning "tip of the frigate") is a headland on the east coast of the island of Sal, Cape Verde. It is situated at the southern end of the Serra Negra mountain, 6 km northeast of the town Santa Maria. To the south of the headland stretches the Costa da Fragata, a 4.7 km long sandy beach which is a protected nature reserve, important as nesting area for loggerhead sea turtles. The nature reserve covers 3.46 km^{2} (1.34 sq mi) of land and 23.47 km^{2} (9.06 sq mi) of ocean.

== See also ==
- List of protected areas in Cape Verde
- Tourism in Cape Verde
