= Praia das Gatas =

Beach in Cape Verde

- Beach
- Location within Cape Verde
- Coordinates: 16.194°N 22.709°W
- Location: Northeastern Boa Vista, Cape Verde
- Access: road

Praia das Gatas (Portuguese meaning "beach of the cats") is a sandy beach in the northeastern part of the island of Boa Vista in Cape Verde. The nearest village is Fundo das Figueiras, 5 km to the southwest. It forms a part of Northern Nature Park (Parque Natural do Norte). The small island Ilhéu dos Pássaros lies off the coast at the Praia das Gatas.
