= Morrinho de Açúcar =

Hill in Cape Verde

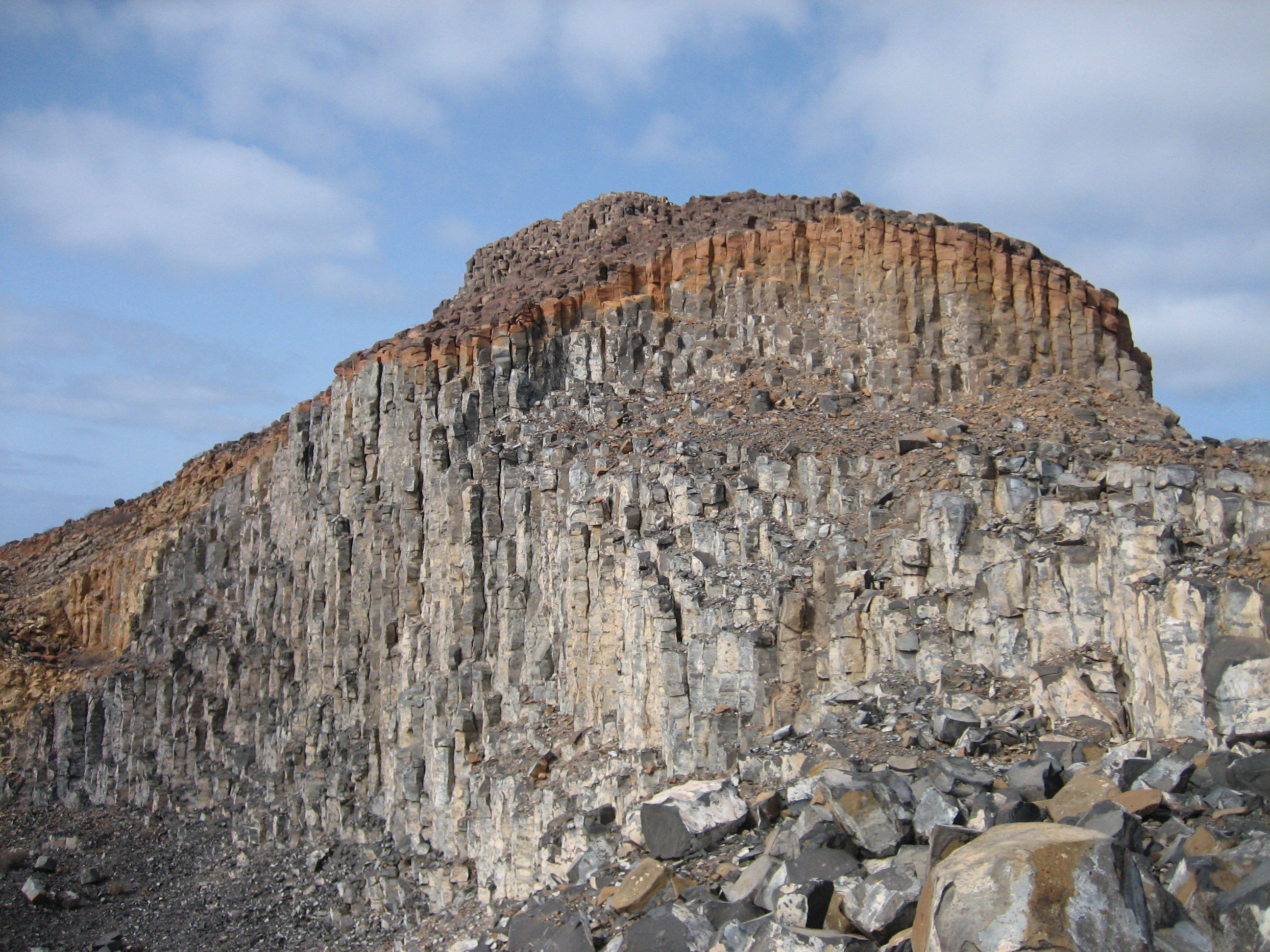
- Morrinho de Açúcar

Highest point
- Elevation: 40 m (130 ft)
- Listing: List of mountains in Cape Verde
- Coordinates: 16°49′44″N 22°57′18″W

Geography
- Location within Cape Verde
- Location: northern Sal

Morrinho de Açúcar (Portuguese meaning "sugar hill") is a small hill in the northern part of the island of Sal in Cape Verde. It is situated 1 km from the north coast and 8 km north of the island capital Espargos. It is a remnant of a volcanic phonolitic chimney, surrounded by a vast plain. It is protected as a natural monument.

== See also ==
- List of mountains in Cape Verde
- List of protected areas in Cape Verde
