= Porto Inglês salt flats =

Protected area of Maio, Cape Verde

Porto Inglês salt flats Salinas do Porto Inglês
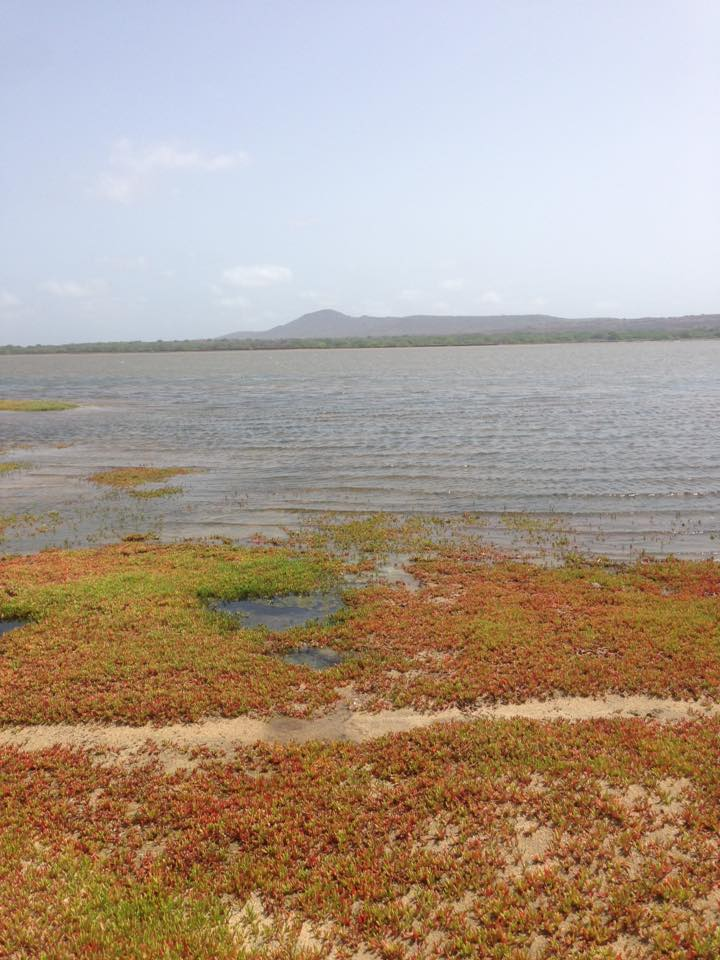

- Location within Cape Verde
- Location: southwestern part of Maio northwest of Porto Inglês
- Coordinates: 15.154°N 23.225°W
- Area: 534 hectares (1,320 acres)
- Created: 2013 (Ramsar site)

Ramsar Wetland
- Designated: 3 July 2013
- Reference no.: 2182

The Porto Inglês salt flats (Portuguese: Salinas do Porto Inglês) are a saline wetland in the southwestern part of the island of Maio, Cape Verde, northwest of the city Porto Inglês. It is a 5.34 km^{2} (2.06 sq mi) protected area (Paisagem Protegida das Salinas do Porto Inglês) and a Ramsar site. It encompasses ecological, landscape, historical and cultural values. The site is frequented by species of birds of conservation interest, some of them protected by national laws and international conventions, and some endemic to the archipelago.

== Fauna ==
The site supports cream-coloured courser (Cursorius cursor) and the endangered loggerhead sea turtle (Caretta caretta). It hosts characteristic sand dune and wetland birds, including the greater hoopoe-lark (Alaemon alaudipes), the black-crowned sparrow lark (Eremopterix nigriceps), bar-tailed lark (Ammomanes cinctura), the sanderling (Calidris alba) and the bar-tailed godwit (Limosa lapponica). It also has an important population of the Kentish plover: 50% of the total population of Cape Verde (150-300 individuals).

== See also ==
- List of protected areas in Cape Verde
