= Serra Negra (Cape Verde) =

Hill on the island of Sal, Cape Verde

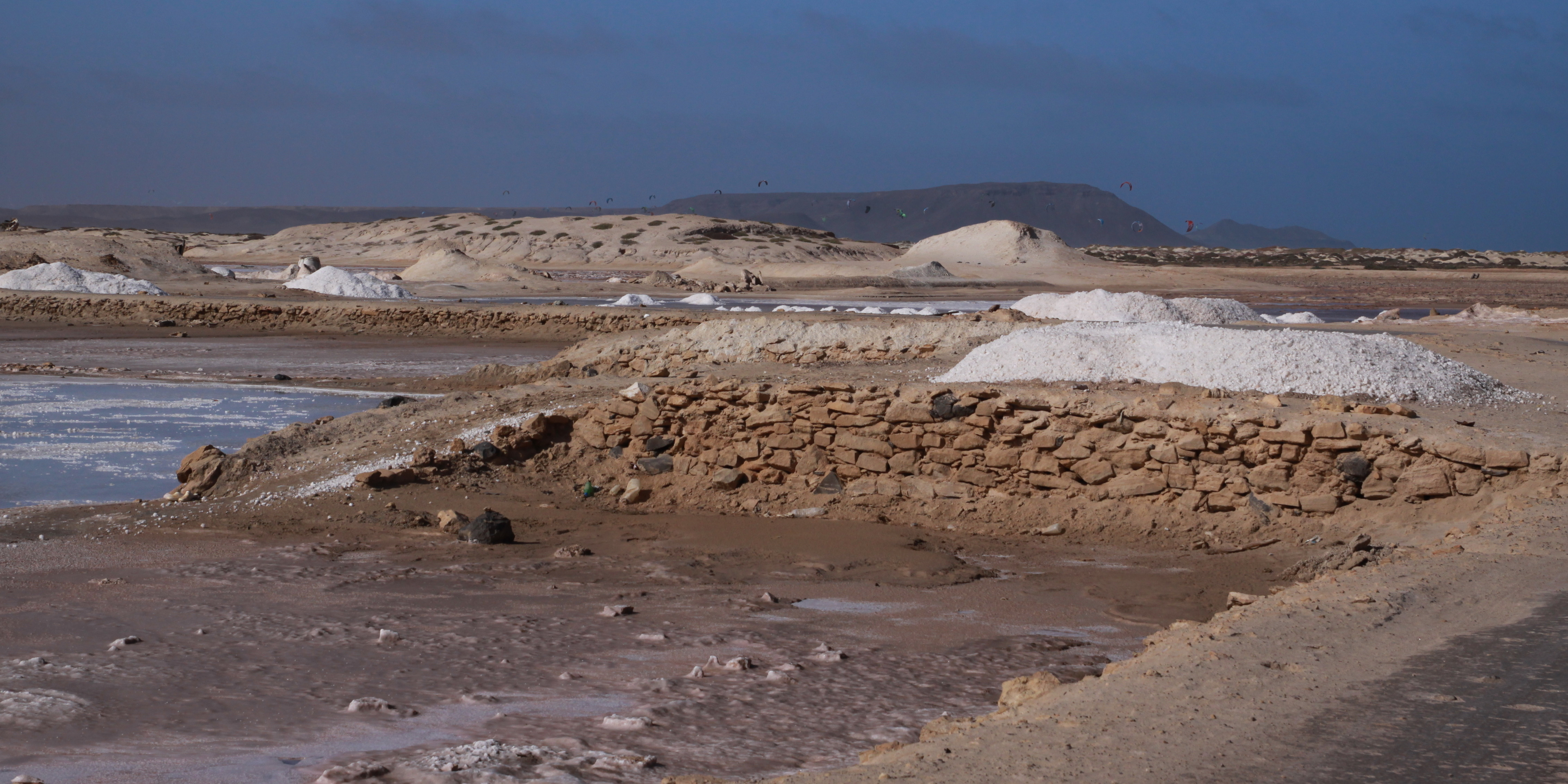
- Serra Negra as seen from the Santa Maria Saltpans

Highest point
- Elevation: 104 m (341 ft)
- Coordinates: 16°39′31″N 22°53′9″W

Naming
- English translation: black mountain
- Language of name: Portuguese
- Pronunciation: Portuguese: [ˈsɛʁɐ ˈneɡɾɐ]

Geography
- Location within Cape Verde
- Location: island of Sal, Cape Verde

Serra Negra is a hill in the southeastern part of the island of Sal in Cape Verde. Its maximum elevation is 104 m, the highest point in southern Sal. It stretches for about 2.5 km along the east coast of the island, between the headland Ponta da Fragata in the south and the Ponta do Morrinho Vermelho in the north. The nearest settlement is Murdeira, to the west. The mountain forms part of a protected area as a nature reserve, important as nesting area for seabirds and turtles. The nature reserve covers 3.31 km^{2} (1.28 sq mi) of land and 22.96 km^{2} (8.86 sq mi) of ocean.

== See also ==
- List of mountains in Cape Verde
