= Cagarral =

Mountain on island of Sal in Cape Verde

- Location within Cape Verde

Highest point
- Elevation: 173 m (568 ft)
- Listing: List of mountains in Cape Verde
- Coordinates: 16°46′26″N 22°53′10″W

Geography
- Location: northeastern Sal

Cagarral is a mountain in the northeastern part of the island of Sal in Cape Verde. It is located near the east coast, 2 km northeast of Pedra de Lume and 6 km east of the island capital Espargos. To its east is the headland Ponta Trás de Cagarral. Together with the mountain and the saltpans to the west, it is a protected area as a protected landscape.

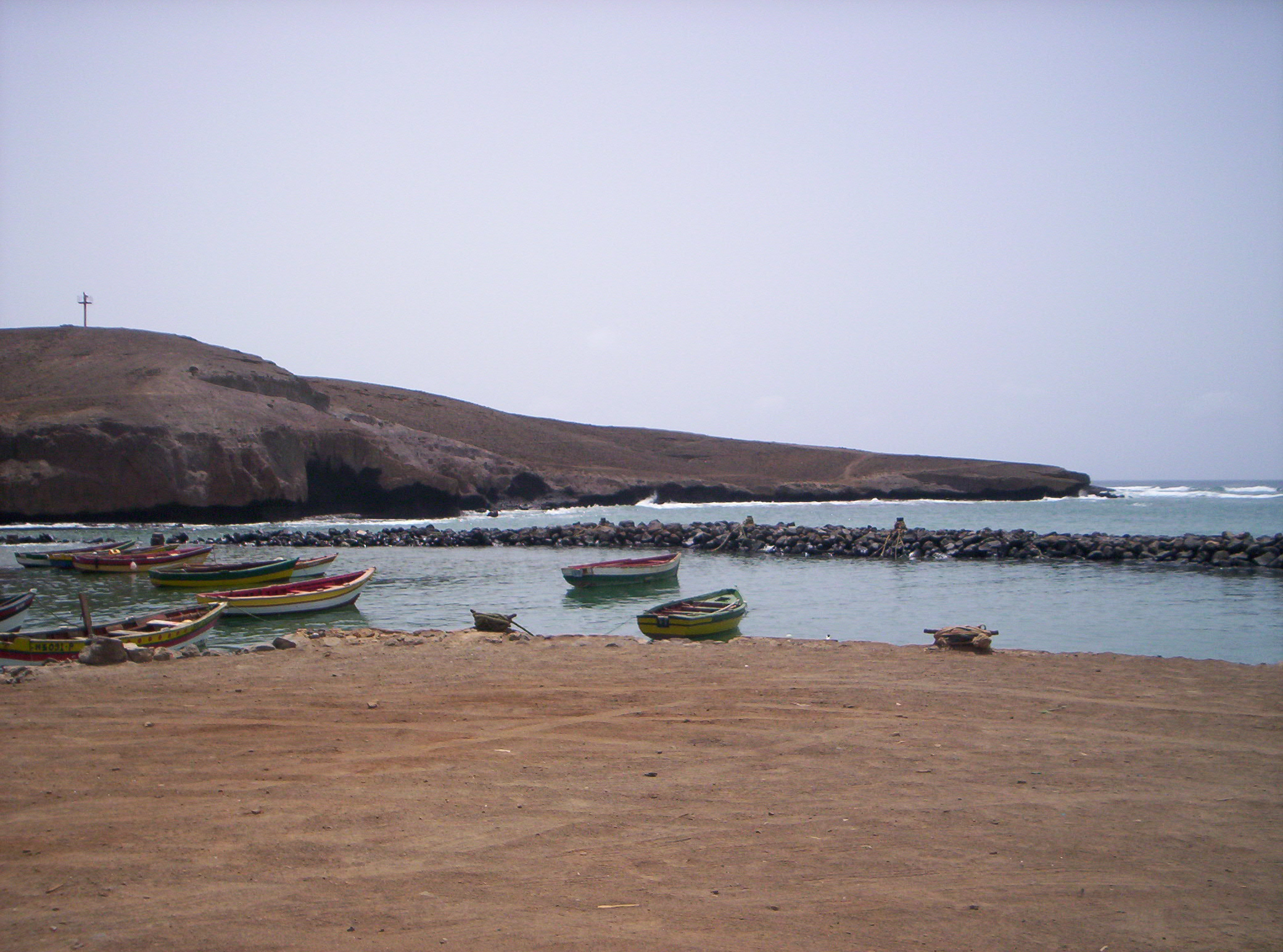
View of the Cagarral headland from the Port of Pedra de Lume
