= Ponta Preta (Northern Sal) =

- Headland
- Location within Cape Verde
- Coordinates: 16°49′31″N 22°59′06″W
- Location: Northern Sal, Cape Verde
- Water bodies: Atlantic Ocean

Ponta Preta (Portuguese meaning "black tip") is a headland in the northwest of the island of Sal in Cape Verde, known as one of the best kitesurfing and windsurfing locales on the island for experienced surfers due to the strong cross off-shore winds. It is approximately 9 km northwest of the island capital of Espargos. The nearest settlement is Terra Boa, 5 km to the southeast. The headland is approximately 28 meters above sea level.
