= Curral Velho, Paraíba =

Curral Velho
- Municipality
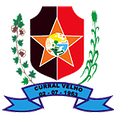
- Coat of arms

- Location in Paraíba state

- Location in Brazil
- Coordinates: 07°34′51″S 38°11′52″W
- Country: Brazil
- Region: Northeast
- State: Paraíba
- Microregion: Itaporanga

Area
  - Total: 222.96 km^{2} (86.09 sq mi)
- Elevation: 338 m (1,109 ft)

Population (2020)
  - Total: 2,512
  - Density: 11.27/km^{2} (29.18/sq mi)
- Time zone: UTC−3 (BRT)
- Postal code: 58990-xxx
- Area code: +55-83

Curral Velho is a municipality in the micro-region of Itaporanga in the Brazilian state of Paraíba. The population is 2,512 (2020 est.) in an area of 222.96 km². The elevation is 338 m.
