= Pedra de Lume =

- Settlement
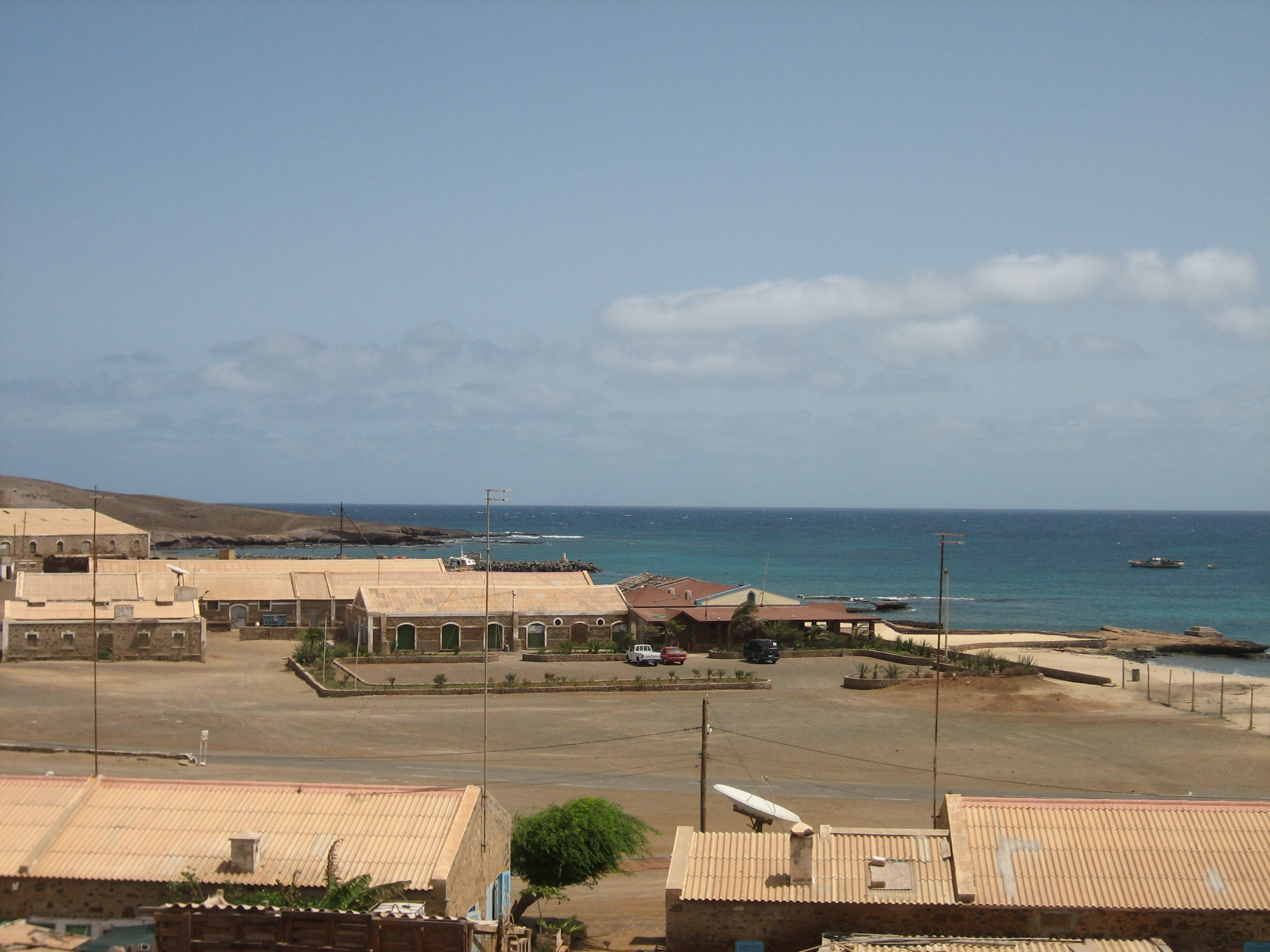

- Location within Cape Verde
- Coordinates: 16.763°N 22.895°W
- Country: Cape Verde
- Island: Sal
- Municipality: Sal
- Civil parish: Nossa Senhora das Dores
- Elevation: 3 m (9.8 ft)

Population (2010)
  - Total: 329
- ID: 41102

Pedra de Lume is a village in the northeastern part of the island of Sal, Cape Verde. The village is situated on the east coast, about 5 km east of the island capital Espargos. It has a small port and a lighthouse, Farol de Pedra de Lume.

== Salt ponds ==
Pedra de Lume has been famous for its salt evaporation ponds (salinas), exploitation of which began in the 18th century. According to geologists, the waters in the lake rise from deep in the earth rather than from lateral infiltration from the ocean. The salinas are situated in the crater of an extinct volcano. Together with the mountain Cagarral, the salinas and the crater form a protected landscape, covering 8.02 km^{2} (3.10 sq mi).

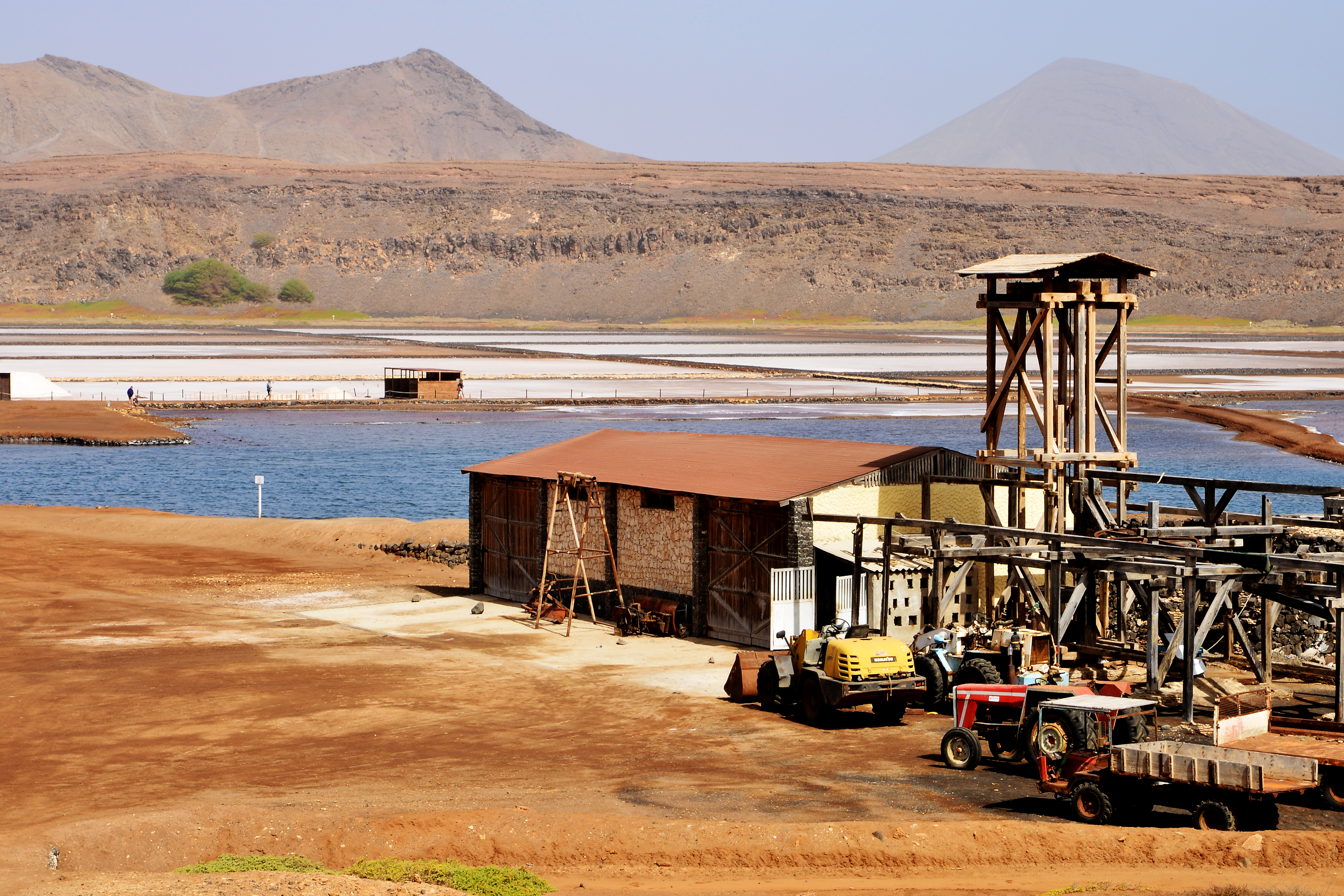
The crater lake

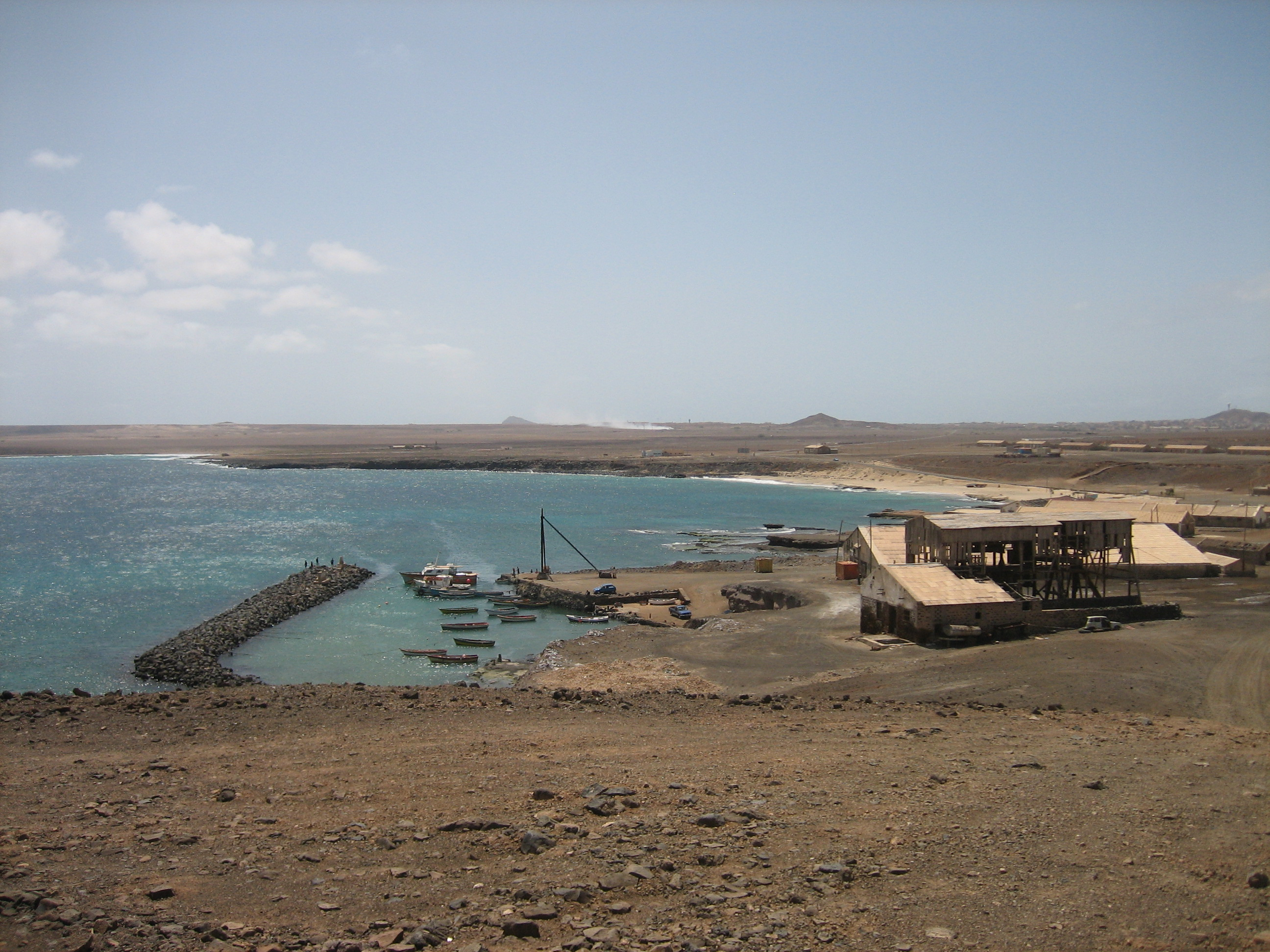
The port of Pedra de Lume

== History ==
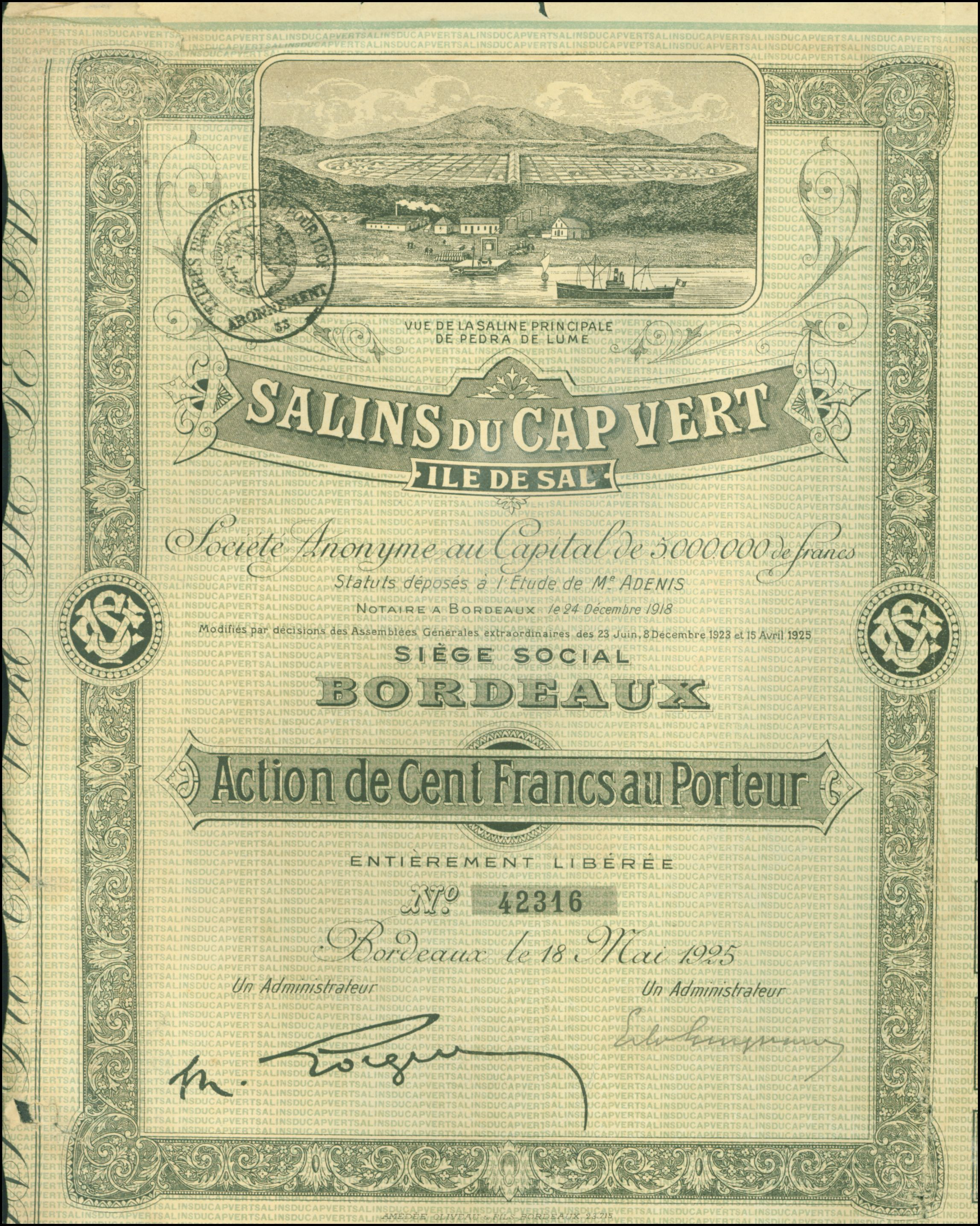
Share of the Salins du Cap Vert, issued 18. May 1925

Pedra de Lume was founded by Manuel António Martins, who started the exploitation of the salt ponds in 1796. A tunnel to the salt ponds was constructed in 1804, and a port in 1805. Salt production flourished in most of the 19th century, but went into decline after 1887, when Brazil, the main export destination, imposed a ban on imported salt. Salt production was revived by the French company Salins du Cap Vert, that installed an 1100 m aerial tramway for salt transport in 1921. Current production is small, and mainly intended for beauty products and thalassotherapy.

== Notable people ==
- Ildo Lobo, singer
- Mirri Lobo, singer

== See also ==
- List of villages and settlements in Cape Verde
- List of protected areas in Cape Verde

== Video ==
- Short BBC documentary on the salt evaporation ponds
