= Ilhéu dos Pássaros (Boa Vista) =

Uninhabited islet in Cape Verde

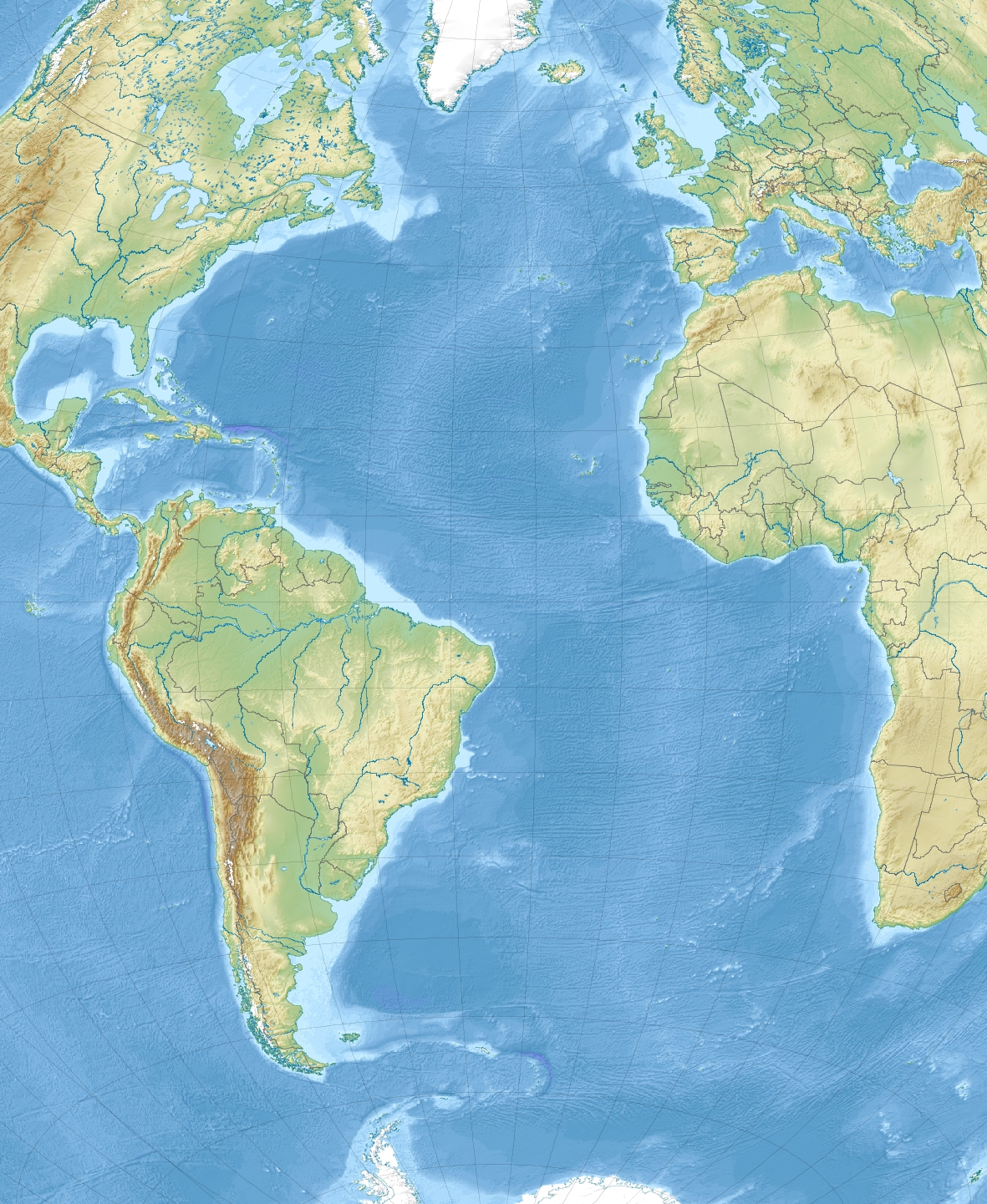
- Location within Cape Verde Location within Atlantic Ocean

Geography
- Location: Atlantic Ocean
- Coordinates: 16.1965°N 22.6985°W
- Archipelago: Cape Verde
- Area: 0.0082 km^{2} (0.0032 sq mi)
- Highest elevation: 5 m (16 ft)

Administration
- Cape Verde
- Concelhos (Municipalities): Boa Vista

Ilhéu dos Pássaros is a small uninhabited islet in the Cape Verde archipelago. It lies about 700 m (2,300 ft) off the northeastern coast of the island of Boa Vista, near the beach Praia das Gatas. The area of the islet is 0.82 ha (2.0 acres); with 38 ha (94 acres) of surrounding marine area it forms a protected area (Reserva Natural Integral Ilhéu dos Pássaros). It is a low, flat islet, covered with sedimentary material and sand. It is connected with the main island by a chain of reefs and volcanic rocks. It is an important nesting site for white-faced storm petrel and band-rumped storm petrel.
