= Baía do Inferno =

Bay in Santiago, Cape Verde

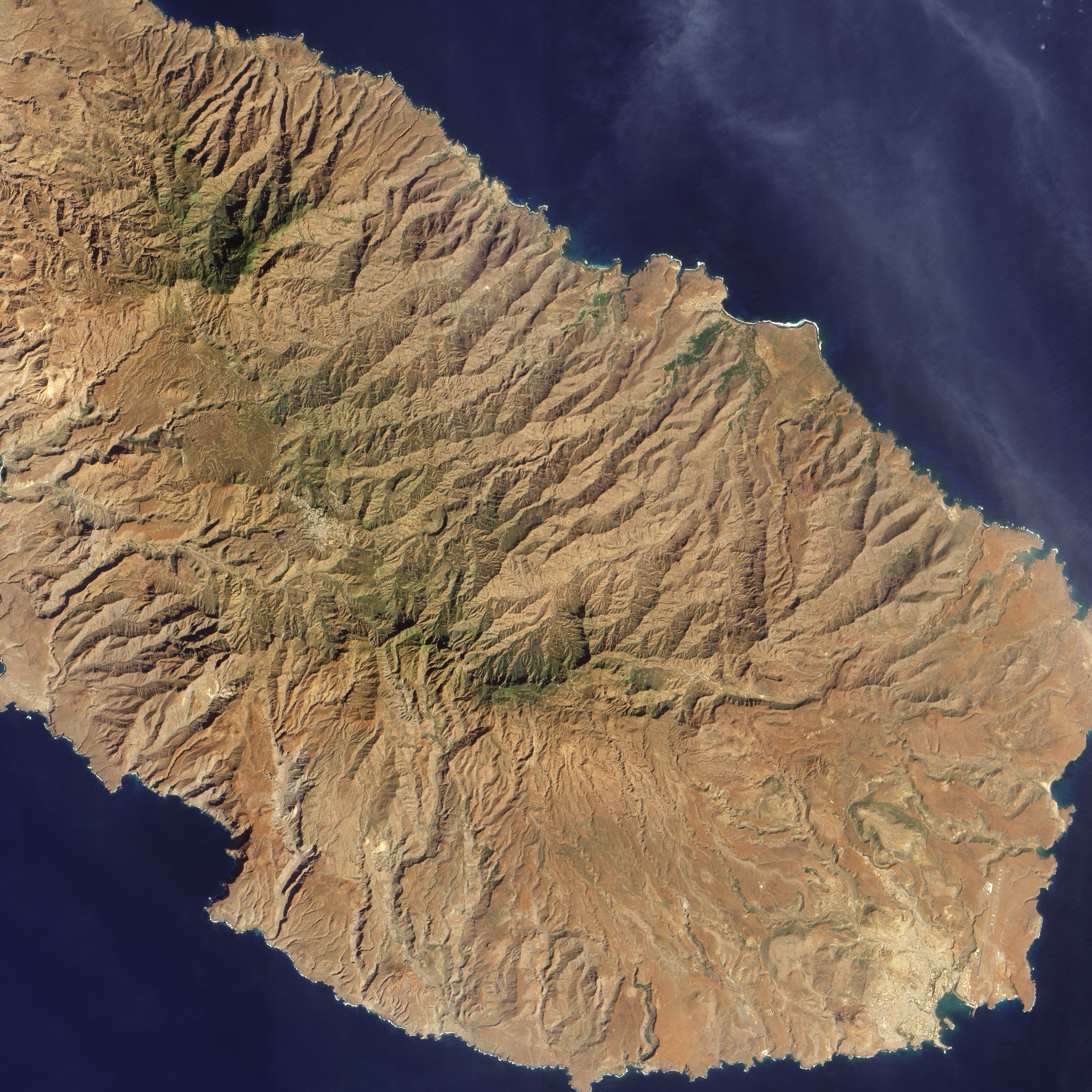
- Satellite photograph of Santiago; the coastal indentation at lower left is the Baia do Inferno

- Location: Southwest of Pico da Antónia, south of Porto Rincão on the island of Santiago, Cape Verde
- Coordinates: 15.0203°N 23.7236°W
- Max. length: 5 km (3.1 mi)
- Max. width: 3 km (1.9 mi)

Baía do Inferno (Portuguese for "bay of hell", also: Baía de Santa Clara) is a bay on the southwest coast of the island of Santiago in Cape Verde in the Atlantic Ocean. The bay is completely within the municipality of Santa Catarina. It is a large and relatively sheltered bay, characterised by steep cliffs, more than 400 m high in some places. The nearest settlement is Entre Picos de Reda, 3 km inland. Rincão lies 4 km north along the coast, Porto Mosquito 6 km southeast.

== Wildlife ==
The bay forms a part of the Important Bird Area "Coastal cliffs between Porto Mosquito and Baia do Inferno", which covers 160 ha and about 8 km of coastline. The site has been identified as an IBA by BirdLife International because the cliffs support 25–30 breeding pairs of red-billed tropicbirds. It also supports the largest colony of brown booby in Cape Verde. The adjacent marine area (13 km^{2}, maximum depth 244 m) has also been identified as an IBA, because of its importance for the red-billed tropicbird.
