= Ilhéu de Curral Velho and adjacent coast Important Bird Area =

Bird sanctuary in Cape Verde

Ilhéu de Curral Velho
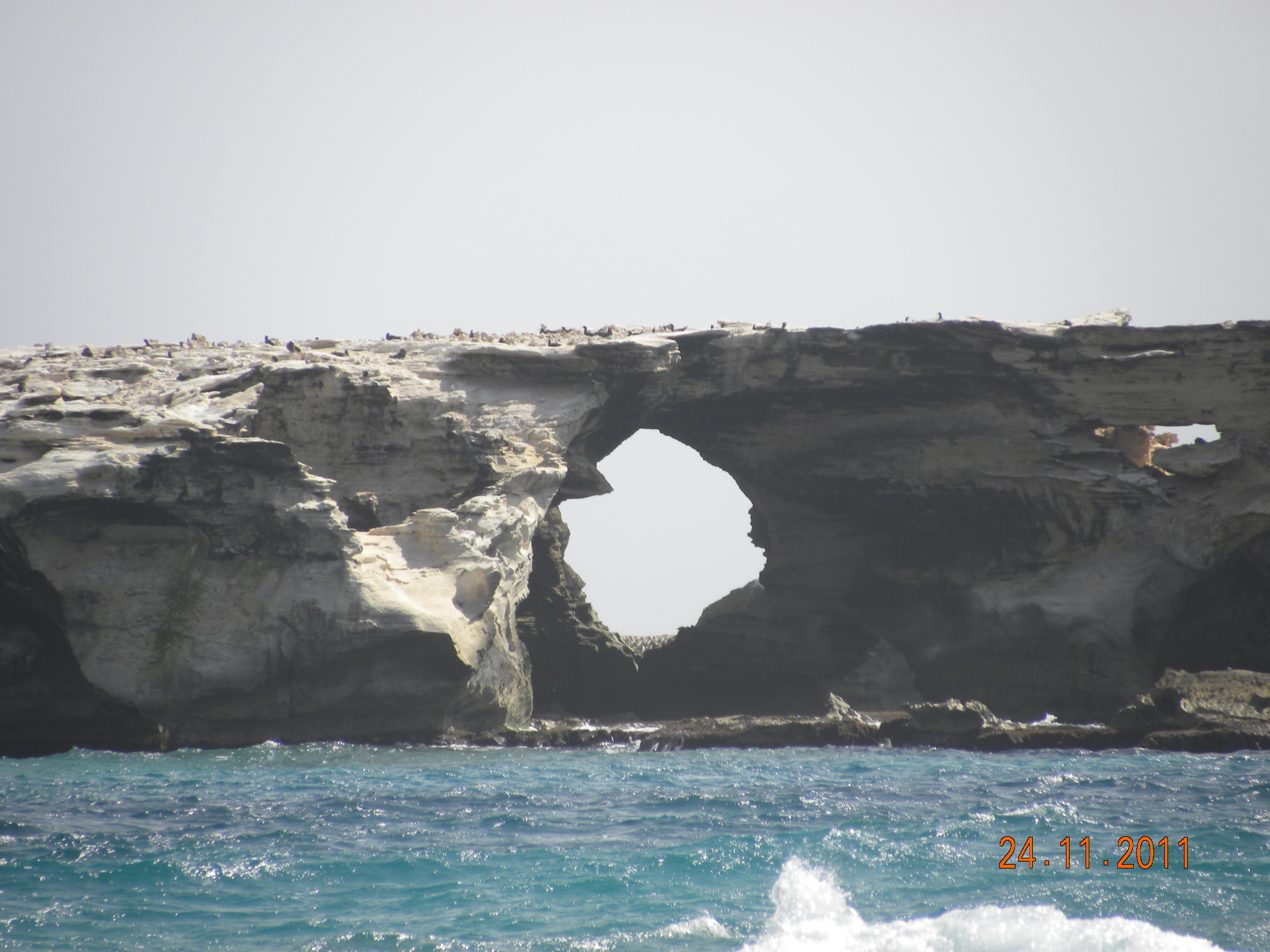
- Ilhéu de Curral Velho and its natural cavern

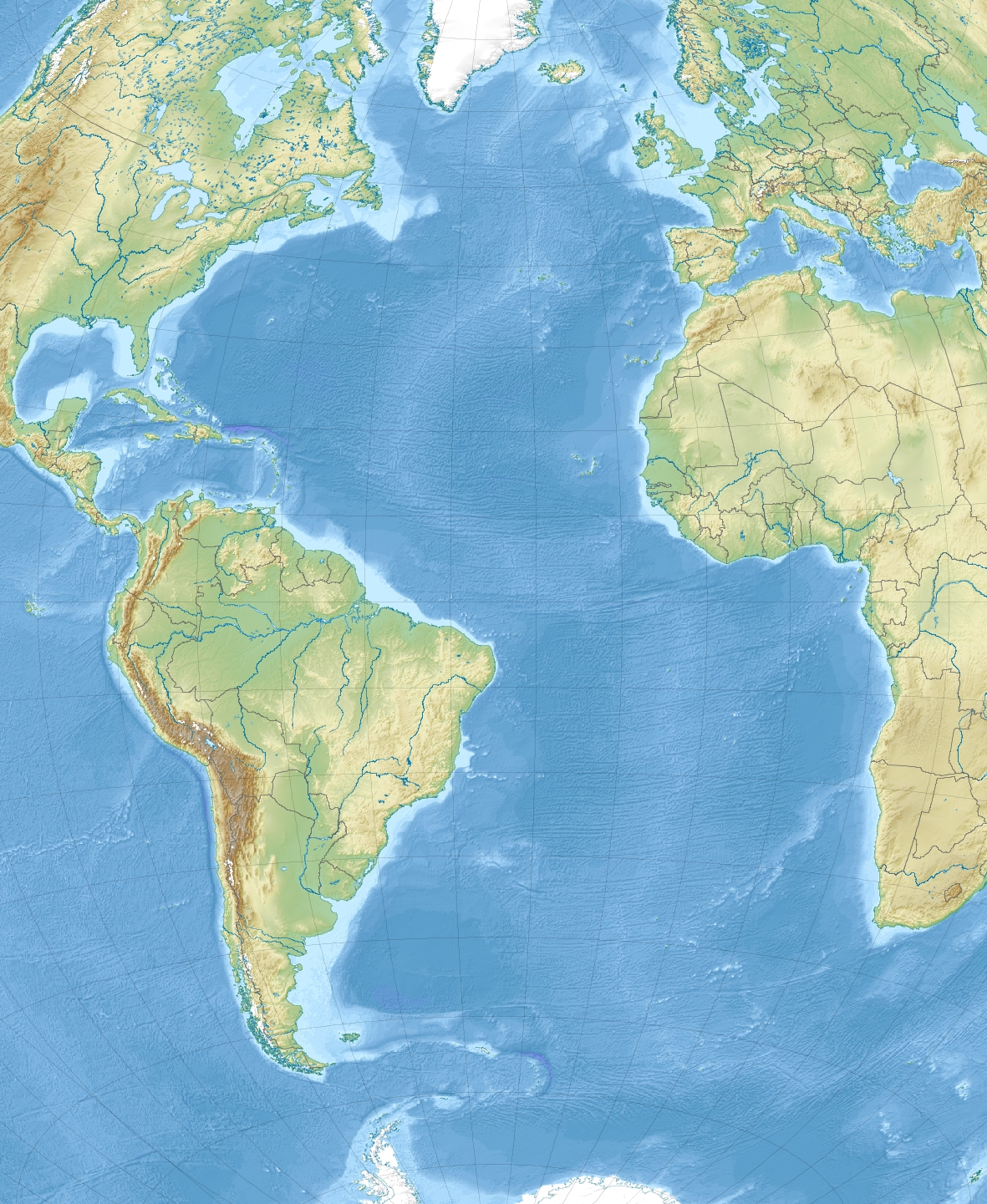
- Location within Cape Verde Location within Atlantic Ocean

Geography
- Location: Atlantic Ocean
- Coordinates: 15.969°N 22.790°W
- Area: 0.0077 km^{2} (0.0030 sq mi)
- Highest elevation: 5 m (16 ft)

Administration
- Cape Verde
- Municipality: Boa Vista

Demographics
- Population: 0

Ramsar Wetland
- Official name: Curral Velho
- Designated: 18 July 2005
- Reference no.: 1575

The Ilhéu de Curral Velho and adjacent coast Important Bird Area lies in the southeastern part of the island of Boa Vista in the Cape Verde archipelago off the coast of north-west Africa in the Atlantic Ocean. It is a 986 ha site consisting of the Ilhéu de Curral Velho, as well as the area opposite it on Boa Vista centred on the deserted village of Curral Velho. It was designated as a Ramsar wetland of international importance on July 18, 2005.

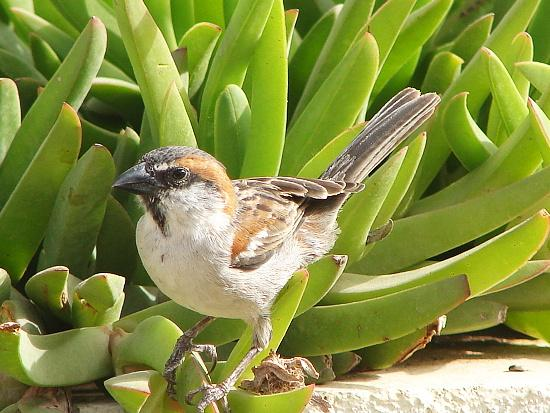
The IBA is important for Iago Sparrows

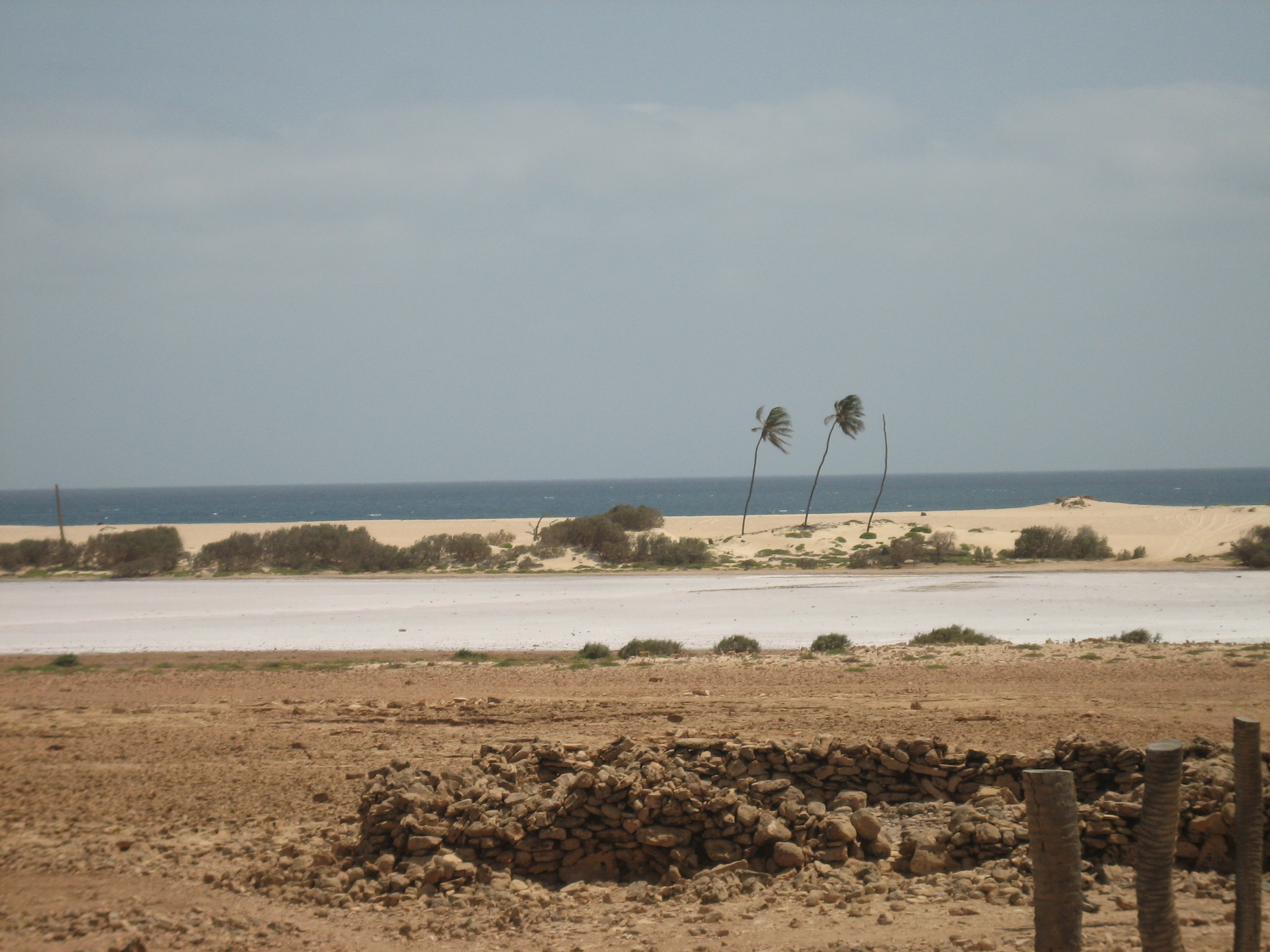
Landscape at Curral Velho

The 0.77 ha (1.9-acre) Ilhéu de Curral Velho is an unvegetated, heavily eroded, calcareous rock, 15 metres (49 ft) in height, lying some 500 m (1,600 ft) off the southernmost point of Boavista. The island and a 41 ha marine area around it are a protected nature reserve (Reserva Natural Integral Ilhéu de Curral Velho).

The area on the main island consists of sand-dunes, a lagoon and an oasis with a vegetation dominated by palm trees, acacias and Tamarix senegalensis. It has a typical arid-zone flora and fauna. The sandy beaches are important nesting sites for threatened Hawksbill and Loggerhead sea turtles. Lizards found in the area include Chioninia stangeri and Hemidactylus bouvieri. The islet is a nesting area for the brown booby, magnificent frigatebird and Cape Verde shearwater. Birds breeding on the adjacent mainland coast include Iago sparrow, common kestrel, common quail, cream-colored courser, Kentish plover and many other species.

== See also ==
- List of islands of Cape Verde
