= Curral Velho, Cape Verde =

Deserted village in Cape Verde

Coordinates: 15.992°N 22.794°W

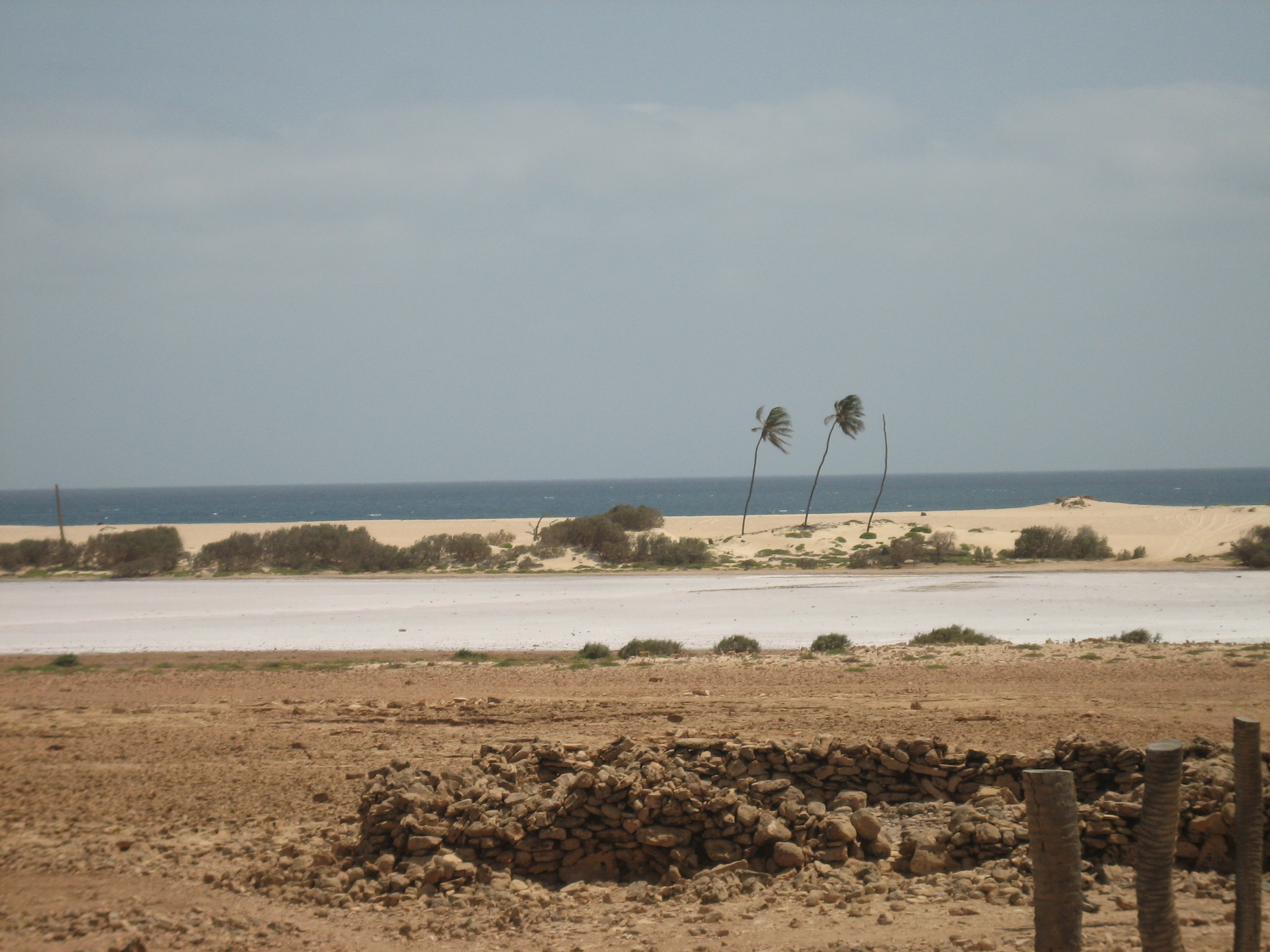
A beach and a saltpan south of Curral Velho

Location of Curral Velho in Cape Verde

Curral Velho is a deserted village in the southern part of the island of Boa Vista, Cape Verde. The village is situated on the south coast, around 25 km (16 mi) southeast of the island capital of Sal Rei. The area around Curral Velho is a protected landscape (Paisagem Protegida de Curral Velho), covering 16.35 square kilometres (6.31 sq mi). The nearby islet Ilhéu de Curral Velho and the adjacent coast are an important area for birds. The old houses of Curral Velho, São Domingos and Prazeres, examples of traditional Capeverdean architecture, are in a precarious state of conservation.

== Gallery ==
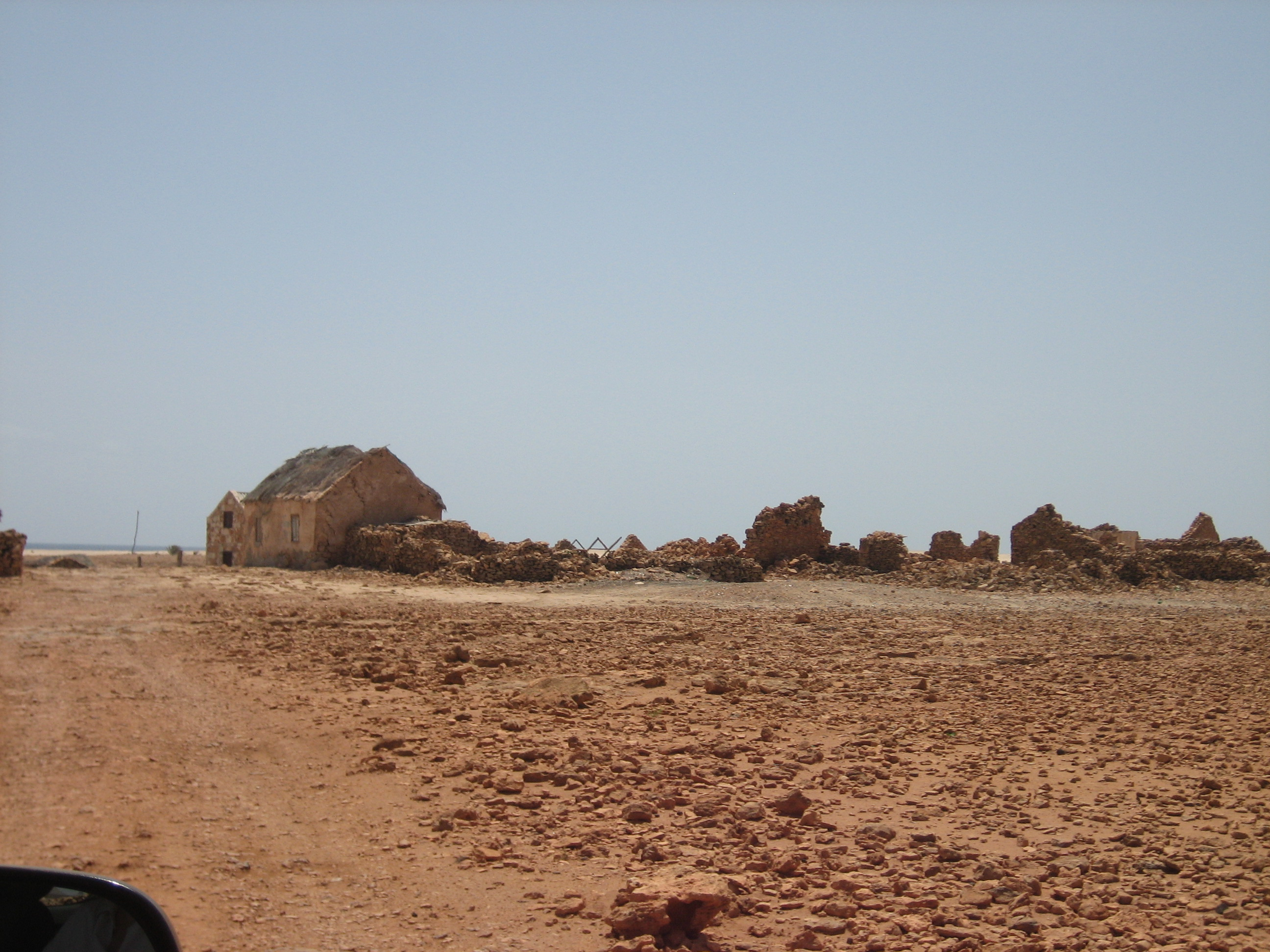
Curral Velho seen from the north

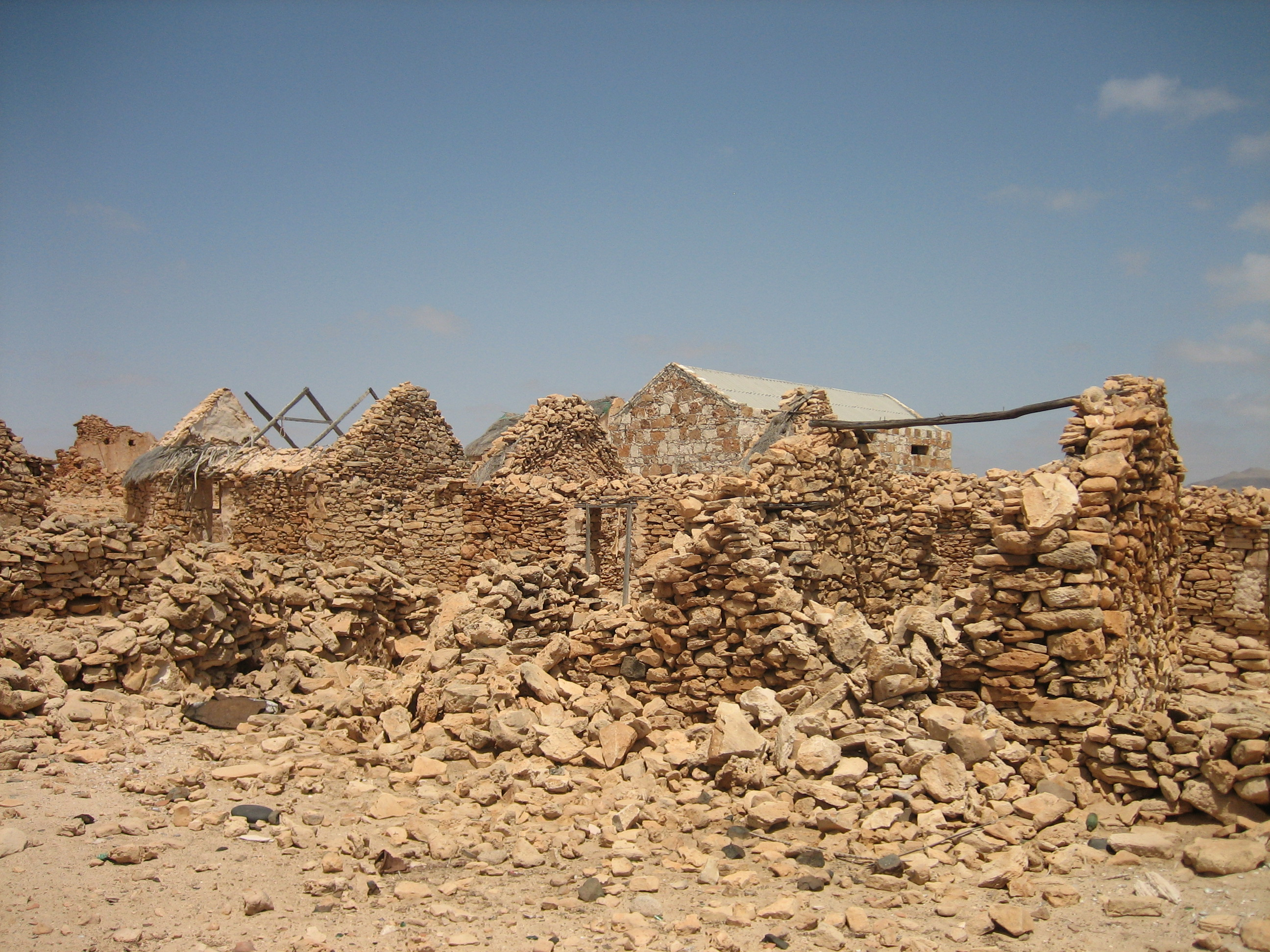
The ruins inside Curral Velho

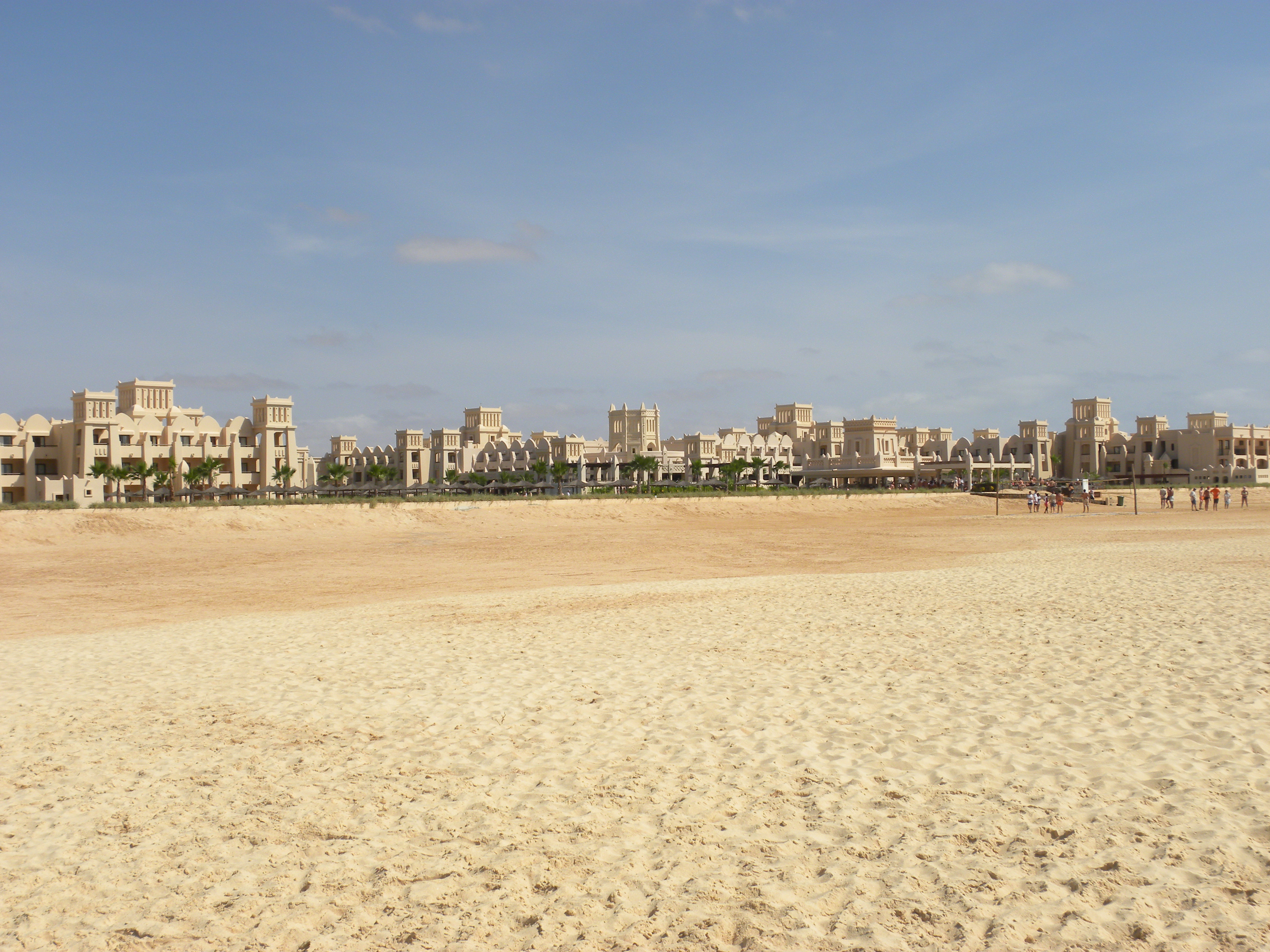
Tuareg resort

== See also ==
- Tourism in Cape Verde
