= Terra Boa, Cape Verde =

Terra Boa
- Settlement
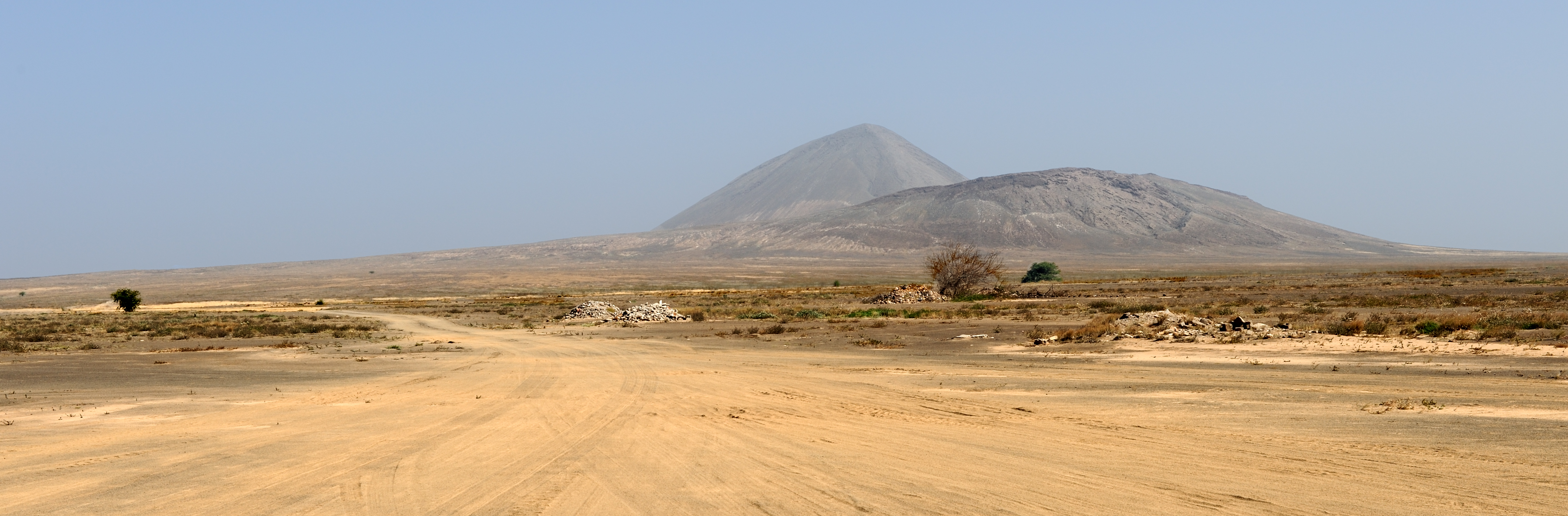
- The surrounding area of Terra Boa.

- Location within Cape Verde
- Coordinates: 16.79°N 22.95°W
- Country: Cape Verde
- Island: Sal
- Municipality: Sal
- Civil parish: Nossa Senhora das Dores

Population (2010)
  - Total: 131
- ID: 41112

Terra Boa (Portuguese meaning the "good land") is a remote village in the northern part of the island of Sal, Cape Verde. In 2010 its population was 131. The village is about 4 km north of the island capital Espargos.
