= Junco (surname) =

Junco is a Spanish surname. Notable people with the surname include:

- Alejandro Junco de la Vega (born 1948), Mexican journalist
- Aura García-Junco (born 1988), Mexican author
- Eduardo Sánchez Junco (1943–2010), Spanish editor
- José Junco (1890–?), Cuban baseball player
- José Álvarez Junco (born 1942), Spanish historian
- Luis Miranda Junco (1919–1969), Spanish footballer
- Mika (footballer, born 1993), born Miguel Ángel Junco Martínez
- Natalia Gómez Junco (born 1992), Mexican footballer
- Nora Junco, Spanish politician
- Oriana Junco (born 1970), Argentine actress
- Pedro Junco (1920–1943), Cuban composer
- Pedro del Barrio Junco y Espriella (1682–?), Spanish colonial administrator
- Reynol Junco (born 1971), American psychologist
- Roberto Gómez Junco (born 1956), Mexican sports journalist, writer, and retired footballer
- Pato O'Ward Junco (born 1999), Mexican racing driver
- Rubén Junco (born 1950), Cuban water polo player
- Sandalio Junco (1894–1942), Cuban Afro-Latino labor figure and communist radical
- Tito Junco, several people
- Víctor Junco (1917–1988), Mexican actor

== See also ==
- Junco (disambiguation)
- The Del Junco family descended from the above
- Juncos (surname)
- Junco Sato Pollack, Japanese artist
