= Junco (disambiguation) =

A junco is a small North American bird of the family Passerellidae.

Junco may also refer to:

== Places ==
- Junco do Seridó, Paraíba, Brazil
- Junco do Maranhão, Maranhão, Brazil
- Palmar de Junco, baseball venue in Cuba
- Xuncu, Asturias, Spain (also spelled Junco)
- El Junco, lake in the Galápagos Islands of Ecuador
- Ilhéu Rabo de Junco, islet in Cape Verde
- Rabo de Junco, hill in Cape Verde

== People ==
- Junco (surname)

== Other ==
- junco, a shrub in the genus Adolphia
- "Junco Partner", 1951 song by James Waynes

== See also ==
- Juncos
- Juncus
