= Rossana Juncos =

Argentine swimmer (born 1961)

Rosanna Juncos
Personal information
- Nationality: Argentine
- Born: 14 April 1961 (age 65) Cordoba

Sport
- Sport: Swimming

Rosanna Juncos (born 14 April 1961) is an Argentine former butterfly, freestyle and medley swimmer. She competed in six events at the 1976 Summer Olympics.

== Personal life ==
Juncos is part of an Argentine Olympic swimming family. Her brother Luis Juncos and her sister-in-law Valentina Aracil (Luis' wife) represented Argentina at the 1984 and 1988 Summer Olympics, respectively. Her American-born niece Natalie Juncos (daughter of Luis and Valentina) is a member of the Argentina women's national football team.
