= Juncos (surname) =

Juncos is a Spanish surname. Notable people with the surname include:

- Leandro Juncos (born 2005), Argentine-American racing driver
- Luis Juncos, Argentine swimmer
- Natalie Juncos, Argentine footballer
- Manuel Fernández Juncos, Puerto Rican journalist
- Rossana Juncos, Argentine swimmer

== See also ==
- Junco (surname)
