= Juncos =

Juncos may refer to:

- Juncos, Puerto Rico, a town
- Juncos (surname), includes a list of people with the name
- Junco, a type of New World sparrows
- Juncos Racing, motor racing team
- Valencianas de Juncos, a volleyball team

== See also ==
- Junco (disambiguation)
