= Baía da Murdeira =

Bay in Cape Verde

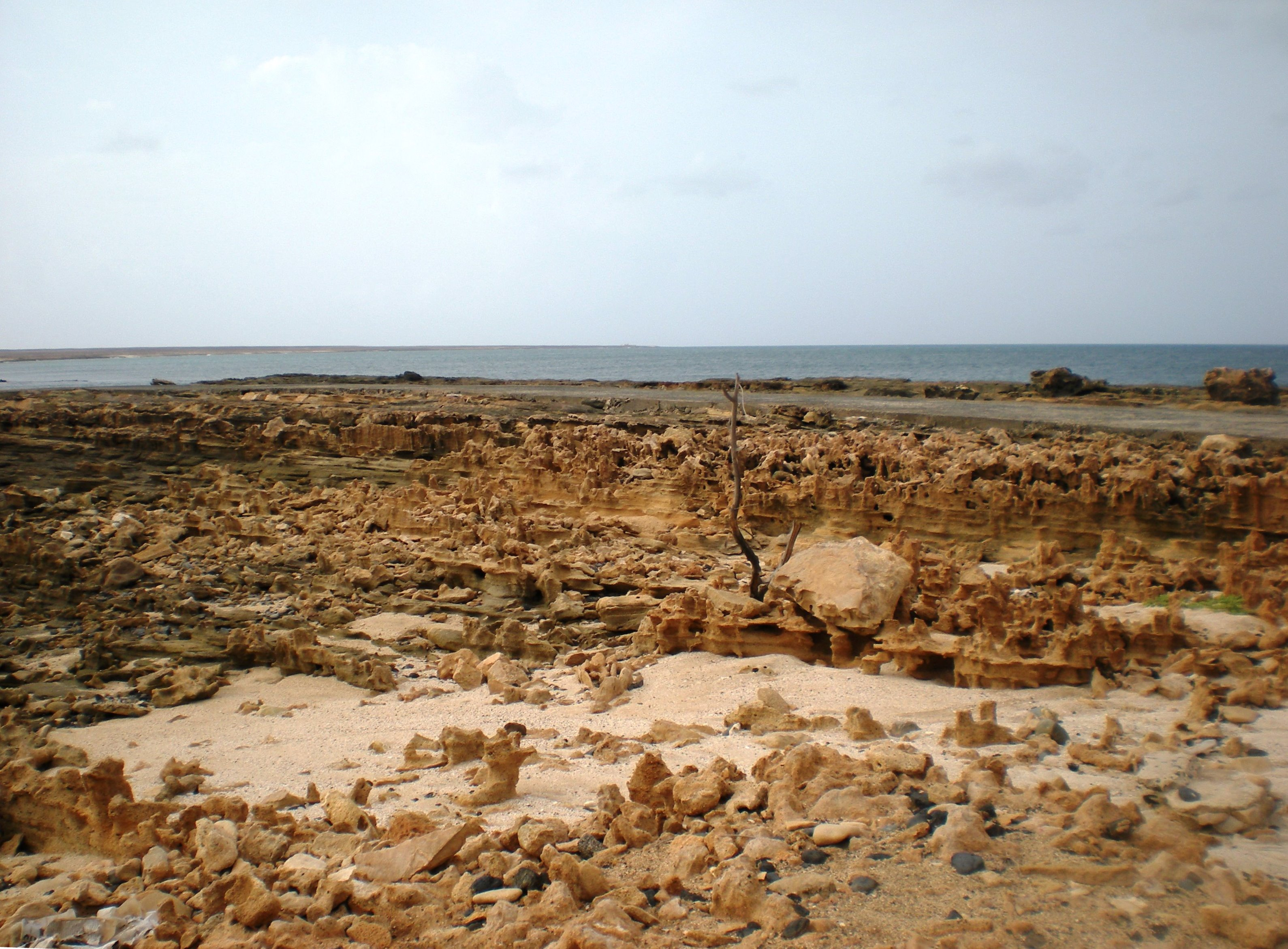
- Baía de Murdeira with its rock pools

- Location within Cape Verde
- Location: west of Murdeira, Cape Verde
- Coordinates: 16.68°N 22.96°W
- Max. length: 5.6 km (3.5 mi)

Baía da Murdeira is a wide crescent shaped bay on the southwest coast of the island of Sal in Cape Verde. It takes its name from the village Murdeira, which lies at its shore. At its northwestern end lie the steep cliff of Rabo de Junco and the islet Ilhéu Rabo de Junco. The bay is protected as a marine nature reserve, which covers 182 hectares of land and 5,925 hectares of sea, including the Ilhéu Rabo de Junco. It is a nesting area for sea turtles and seabirds.

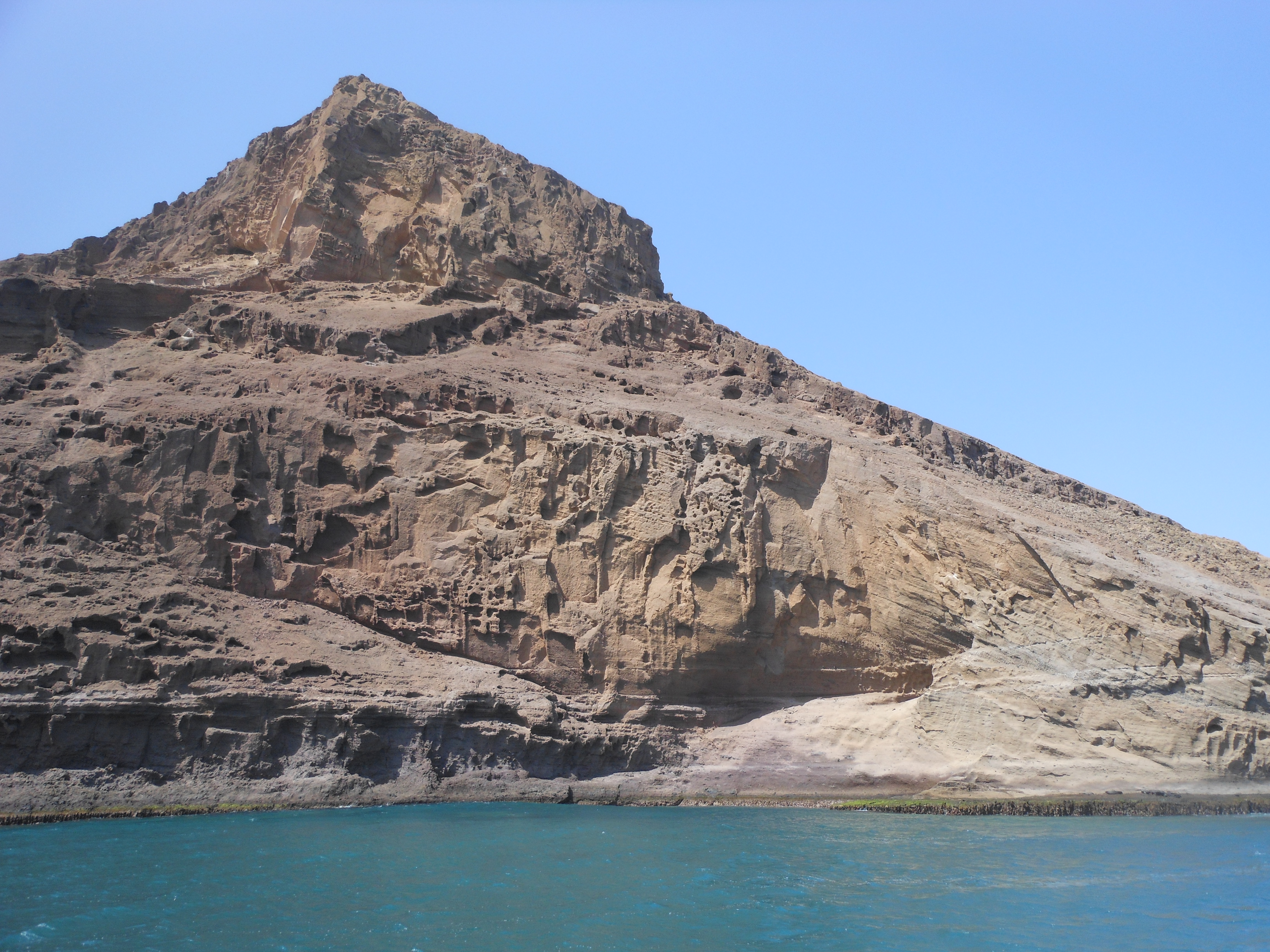
Rabo de Junco at the northwest of the bay
