= Rabo de Junco =

Mountain in Cape Verde

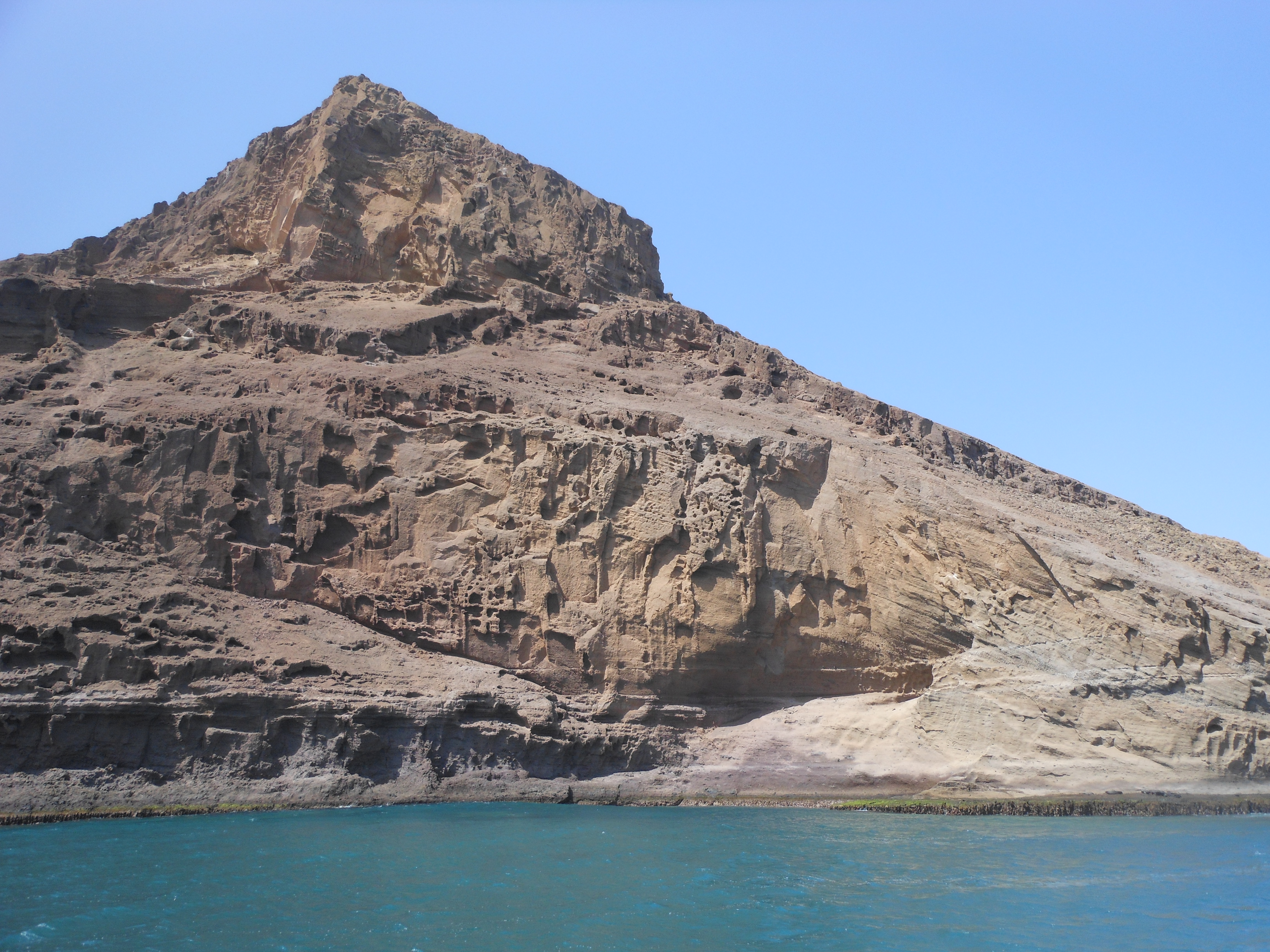
- South face of Rabo de Junco

Highest point
- Elevation: 165 m (541 ft)
- Listing: List of mountains in Cape Verde
- Coordinates: 16°41′46″N 22°58′55″W

Geography
- Location within Cape Verde
- Location: western Sal

Rabo de Junco (also: Monte Leão) is a hill on the west coast of the island of Sal in Cape Verde. It is situated at the northern end of the Baía da Murdeira, 8 kilometres (5.0 mi) southwest of the island capital Espargos. Its steep eroded south face towards the bay is an important nesting area for birds. Rabo de Junco and the surrounding 154 hectares (380 acres) are protected as a nature reserve. It was mentioned as Rabadyunk in the 1747 map by Jacques-Nicolas Bellin. To its west lies the uninhabited islet Ilhéu Rabo de Junco.

== See also ==
- List of mountains in Cape Verde
- List of protected areas in Cape Verde
