= Murdeira =

- Settlement
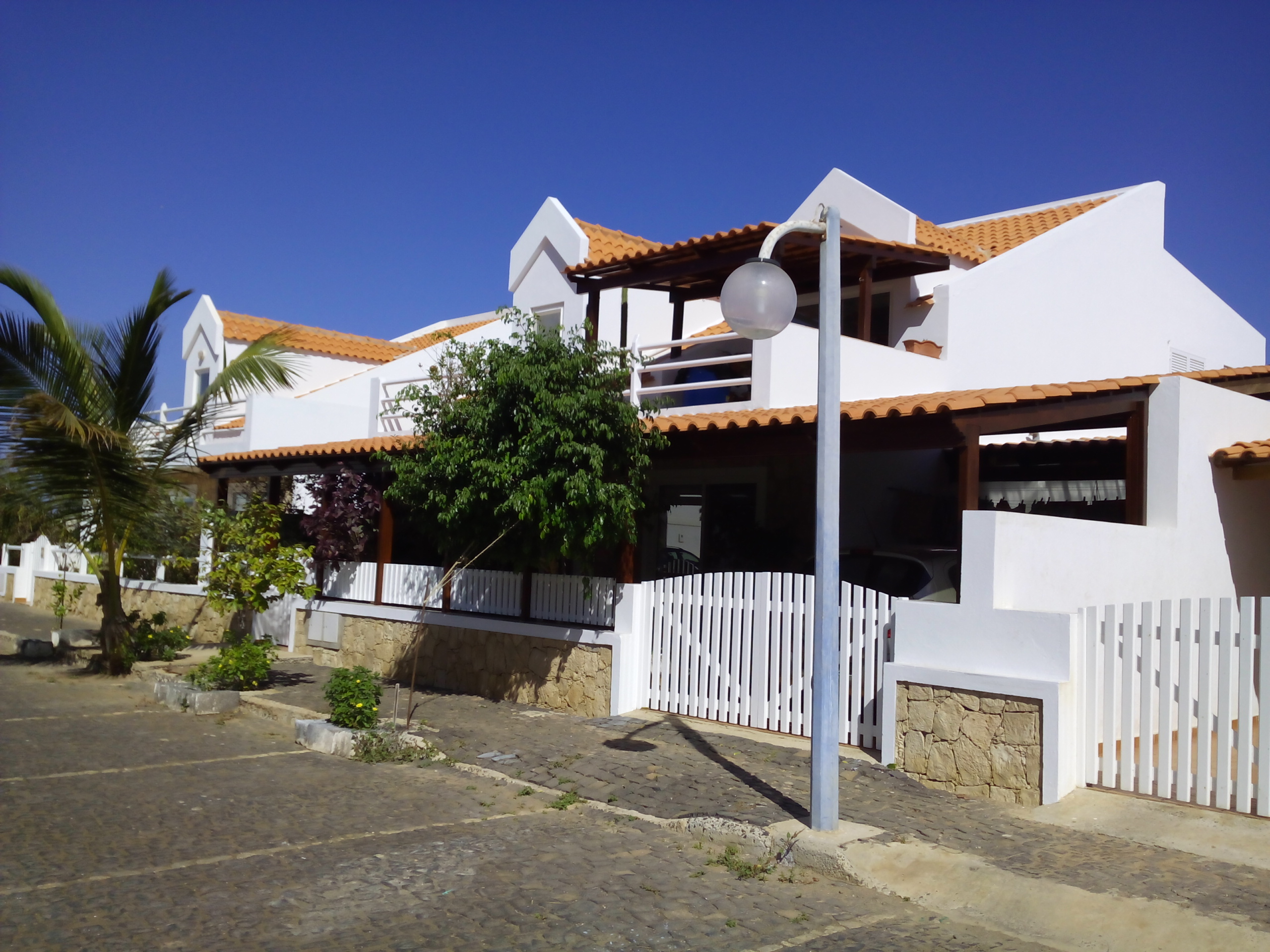
- A villa in Murdeira

- Location within Cape Verde
- Coordinates: 16.682°N 22.937°W
- Country: Cape Verde
- Island: Sal
- Municipality: Sal
- Civil parish: Nossa Senhora das Dores
- Elevation: 1 m (3.3 ft)

Population (2010)
  - Total: 248
- ID: 41111

Murdeira is a village in the island of Sal, Cape Verde. The village is situated on the west coast, 9 km south of the island capital Espargos and 10 km north of Santa Maria. roughly midway along the island's major highway linking

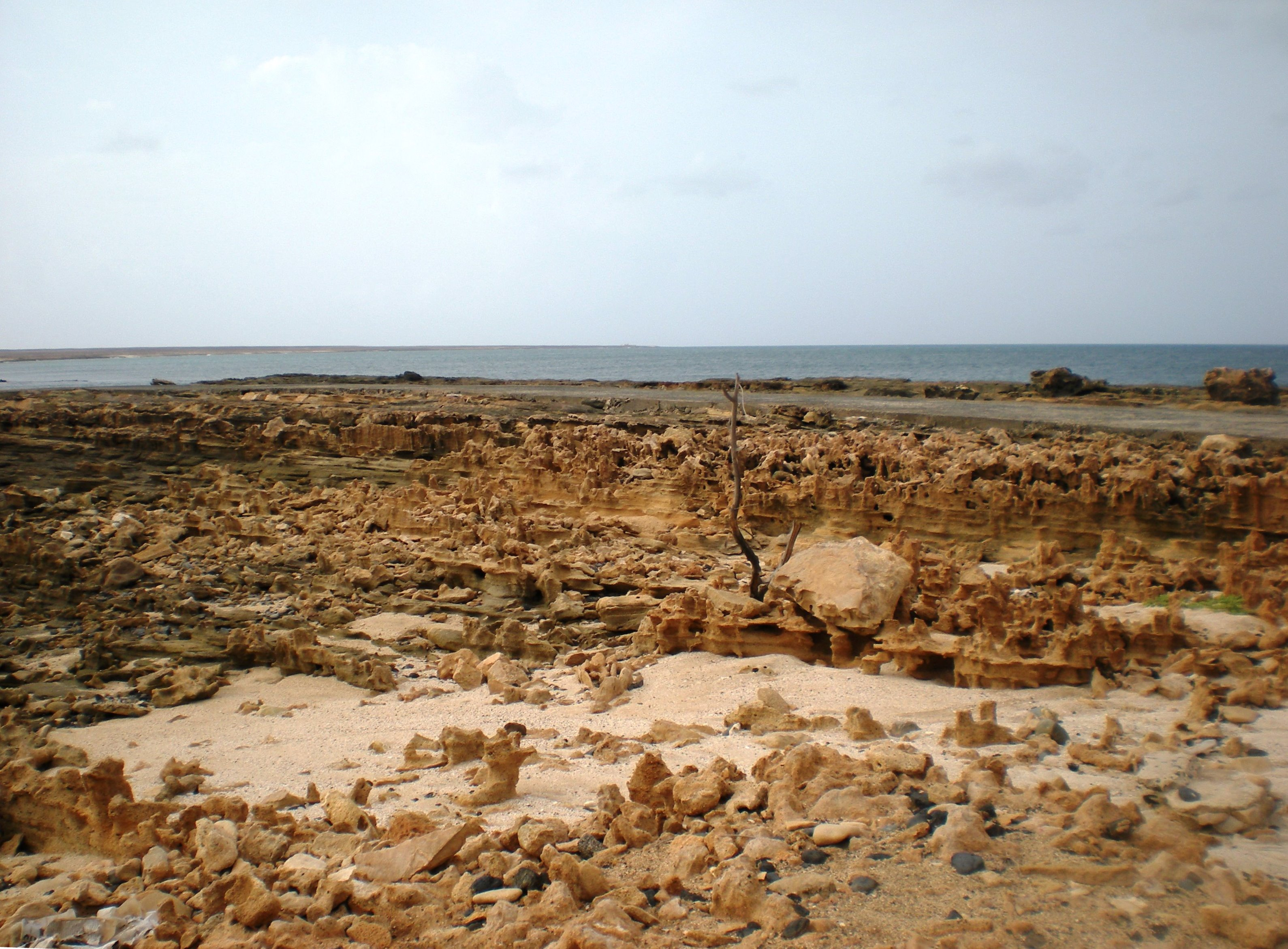
Baía de Murdeira with its rock pools

Murdeira was originally a small settlement of mostly farmers and fishermen. It was mentioned as "Mordera" in the 1747 map by Jacques-Nicolas Bellin. Starting in the late 1990s, a major private undertaking led to the building of a seaside tourist village in the region, called "Aldeamento Turístico da Murdeira", which grew a permanent population as the houses were gradually bought, mostly by island locals and some foreigners. The name now primarily refers to this semi-gated community.

As with the rest of the island, the area around the village is dominated by mostly bare soil and some desert sands. Natural vegetation is scarce, but small concentrations of Faidherbia albida trees and small bushes occur in the region, near the coastline. The village sits in the center of a small cove beach inside the much larger Murdeira Bay (Baía de Murdeira), a nature reserve known for its rich underwater sealife and a small coral reef.

== See also ==
- List of villages and settlements in Cape Verde
- Tourism in Cape Verde
