= Tito Junco =

Tito Junco may refer to:

- Tito Junco (Cuban actor) (1944–2003)
- Tito Junco (Mexican actor) (1915–1983)
