= Ilhéu Rabo de Junco =

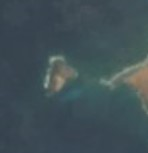
- Ilhéu Rabo de Junco

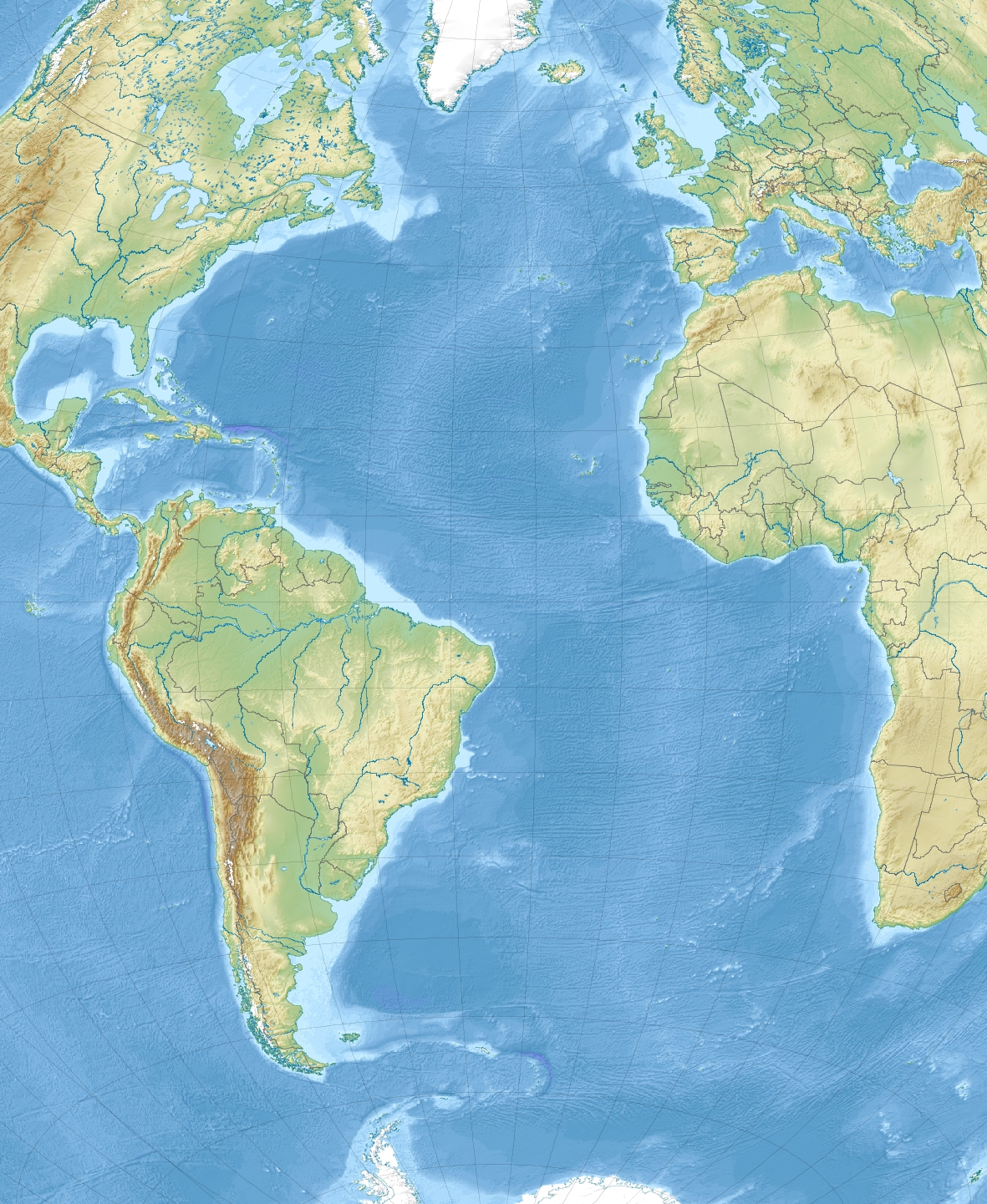
- Location within Cape Verde Location within Atlantic Ocean

Geography
- Location: Atlantic Ocean
- Coordinates: 16.700°N 22.993°W
- Area: 0.02 km^{2} (0.0077 sq mi)
- Length: 0.26 km (0.162 mi)
- Width: 0.17 km (0.106 mi)
- Highest elevation: 18 m (59 ft)

Administration
- Cape Verde
- Municipality: Sal

Demographics
- Population: 0

Ilhéu Rabo de Junco is an uninhabited islet near the west coast of Sal Island, Cape Verde. It lies about 300 metres (980 feet) from the coast. It is 253 metres (830 feet) long and 165 metres (541 feet) wide, its shoreline is about 878 metres (2,881 feet) long. It is the only islet near the island of Sal. Baía da Murdeira lies to the southeast of the islet. Further east is the highest point in southern Sal named Rabo de Junco, which has an elevation of 165 metres (541 feet). The islet is part of the marine nature reserve Baía da Murdeira.
