= Valentina Aracil =

Argentine swimmer

Personal information
- Born: 28 December 1966 (age 59) Mar del Plata, Argentina

Sport
- Sport: Swimming

Valentina Aracil (born 28 December 1966) is an Argentine breaststroke and individual medley swimmer. She competed in four events at the 1988 Summer Olympics.

== Personal life ==
Aracil moved for studies to Michigan, United States in 1988. She now resides in Little Rock, Arkansas, after living in Minnesota and Mississippi. She is married to fellow Argentine Olympic swimmer Luis Juncos and they have two American-born children, both association football players, a son and a daughter (Argentina women's national football team member Natalie Juncos).
