= Junco Sato Pollack =

- Education: Rochester Institute of Technology (MFA)
- Known for: Textiles
- Movement: Abstract art, Minimalism
- Website: http://juncosatopollack.com/

Junco Sato Pollack is a textile artist. As a native of Japan, having lived in the United States for more than 30 years, she aims to combine Eastern and Western influences in her art and create work that has a modernist, minimal design.

== Early life and education ==
Pollack was born in Japan. She received a bachelor's degree in English Linguistics and Literature from Aoyama Gakuin University in 1972. She completed her post-baccalaureate study and apprenticeship under Tsuguo Odani at Seian Women’s University in Kyoto, Japan. Between 1974 and 1980, she studied sericulture, reeling process, spinning, and weaving silk at Kyoto Fiber Polytechnic University. In 1989, Pollack studied with Marie Ann Quette at the Musée des Arts Décoratifs, Paris, France. She completed her Master of Fine Arts in textile design in 1991 at the School for American Crafts, College of Fine and Applied Arts, Rochester Institute of Technology in Rochester, New York.

== Career ==
Junco Sato Pollack received her Masters of Fine Arts degree in textile design from Rochester Institute of Technology in 1991. In 1992 she began teaching as an Associate Professor of Textiles at The Ernest G. Welch School of Art and Design at Georgia State University until 2012.

Her abstract, textile artwork aims to combine Eastern influences of mediation and Zen with Western influences.

Since 2000 she has worked by combining paintings and digital imaging. She transfers the images onto polyester and metallic fabrics in a process known as dye sublimation. This process helps her to create her large and light reflective fabric sculptures that seem to float in space. This process is environmentally sustainable. Pollack has led workshops on Kudzu processing aimed for weavers, paper makers, knitters, designers and artists. These workshops stem from her interest in kudzu as a sustainable and viable resource in art.

Pollack has received grants, fellowships and awards, and participated in exhibitions.

== Work ==
=== Notable collections ===
- Museum of Art and Design, New York, New York
- Frances Loeb Memorial Library Materials Collection of the Graduate School of Design, Harvard University
- Rochester Institute of Technology Wallace Library Art Collection, New York
- Kaikan Museum, Arimatsu, Japan

=== Installations ===
- Hotel Mandarin Oriental Miami, Miami, Florida
- Pittsburgh Airport, Pittsburgh, Pennsylvania
- Pinnacle Assurance, Denver, Colorado

=== Awards and nominations ===
- Finalist, the 11th International Lace Biennial Competition and Exhibition, Brussels, Belgium (2004)
- Finalist, Outstanding Achievement and Recognition, International Textile Design Contest, Tokyo, Japan (1994)
