= Oriana Junco =

Argentine actress and media personality (born 1970)

- Born: 4 January 1970 (age 55); Buenos Aires, Argentina
- Occupations: Actress; media personality

Oriana Junco (born 4 January 1970) is an Argentine actress and media personality.

== Life and career ==
Oriana Junco was born on 4 January 1970 in Buenos Aires to Juan Carlos Junco and Catalina Ester Zapatero. She worked as a public relations officer for 20 years.

== Filmography ==
- Me gusta ser mujer (1993)
- Much Dance (2001)
- Zap TV (2002)
- Sin código (2005–2006)
- Los únicos (2011)
- Pasión de sábado (2011)
- SQP (2011–2013)
- Infama (2013)
- Malas muchachas (2013)
- Periodismo para todos (2014)
- El muro infernal (2020)
