= Junco do Seridó =

Coordinates: 7°00′S 36°43′W

- Municipality
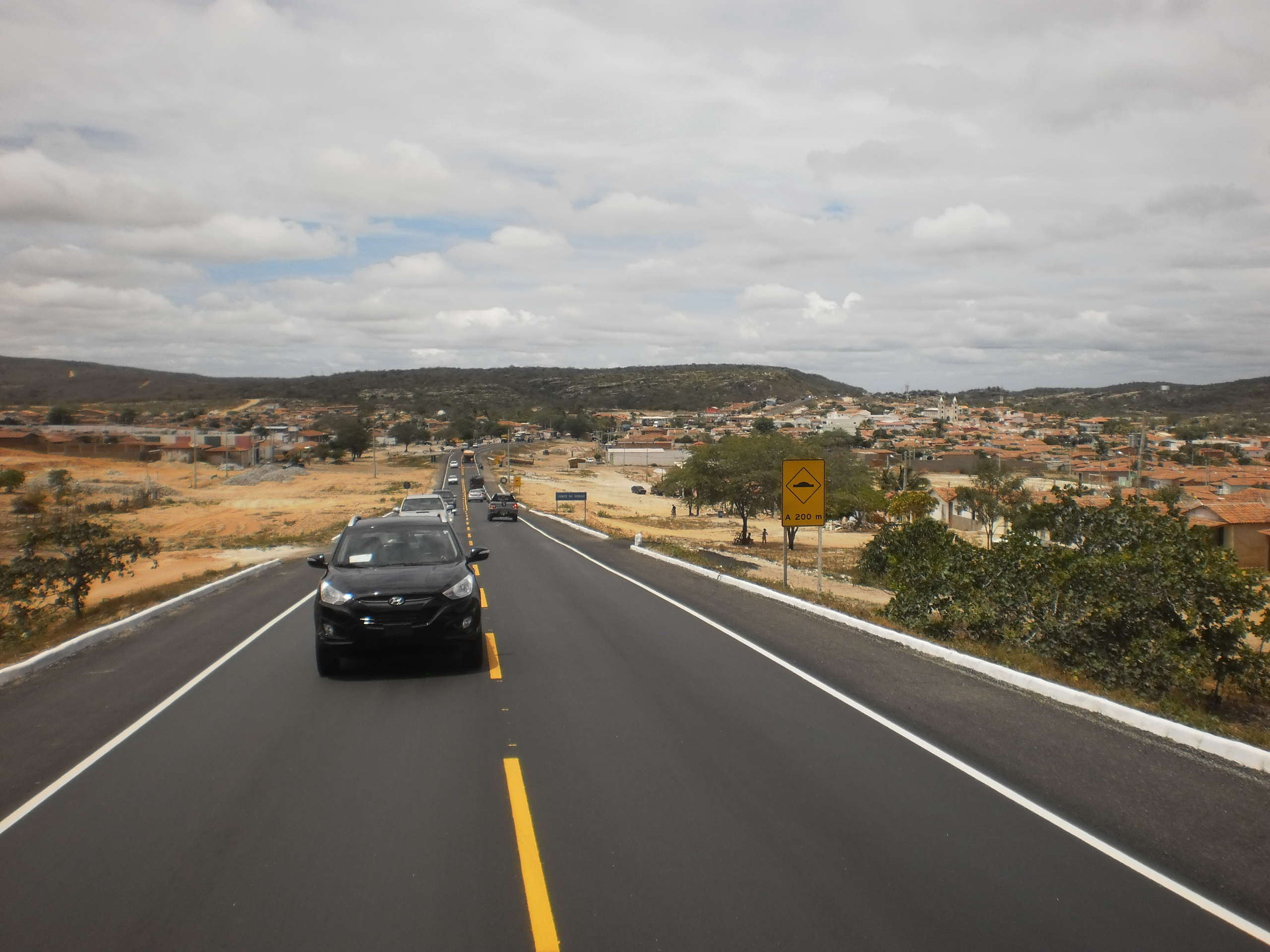

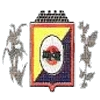
- Coat of arms
- Interactive map of Junco do Seridó
- Country: Brazil
- Region: South
- State: Paraíba
- Mesoregion: Boborema

Population (2020)
  - Total: 7,195
- Time zone: UTC−3 (BRT)

Junco do Seridó (Central northeastern portuguese pronunciation: [ˈʒũkŭ du siɾiˈdɔ]) is a municipality in the state of Paraíba in the Northeast Region of Brazil.

== See also ==
- List of municipalities in Paraíba
