= Sal, Cape Verde =

Island in Cape Verde

Sal
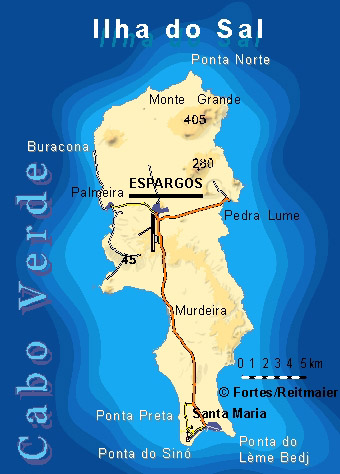

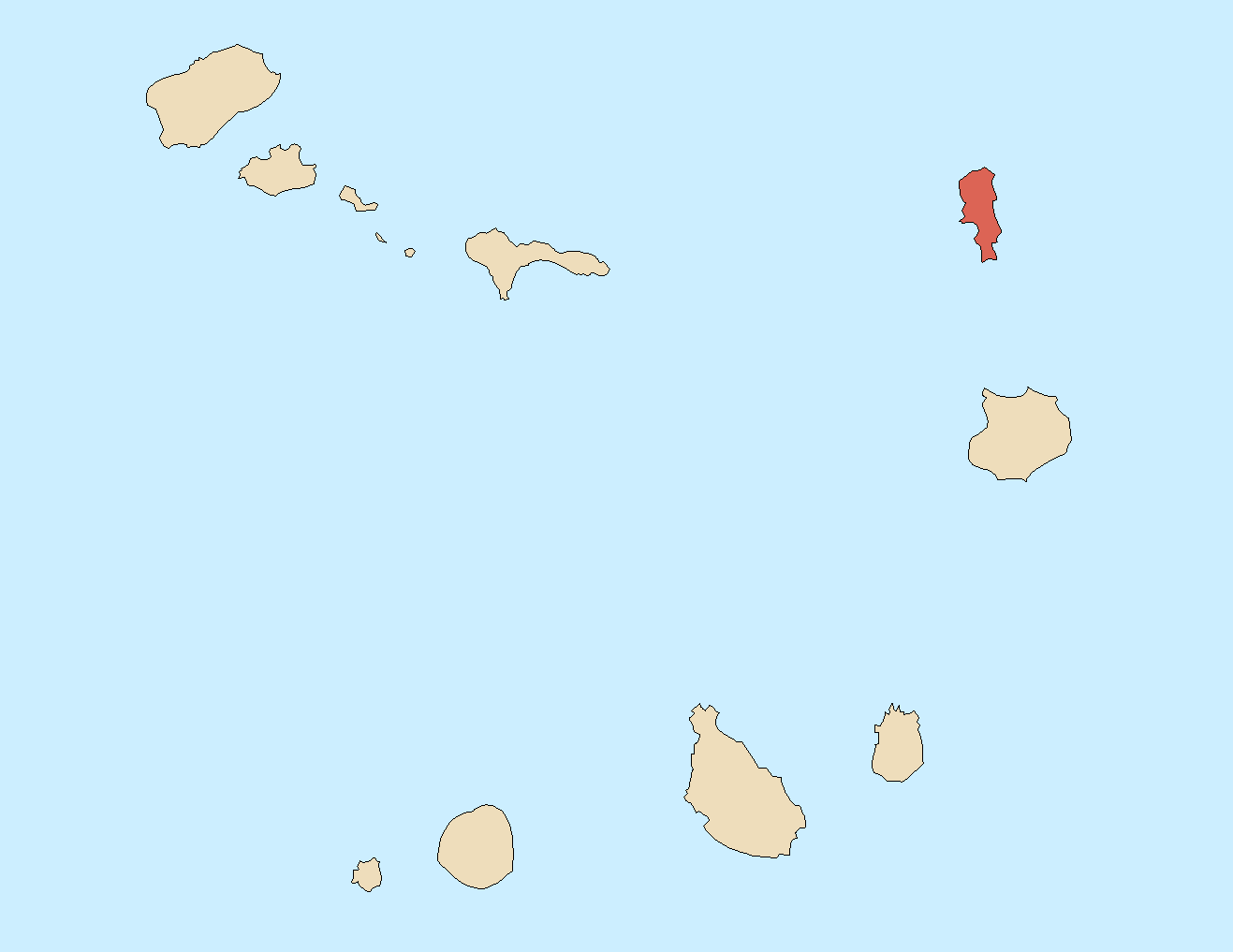

- Location within Cape Verde Location within Africa

Geography
- Location: Africa
- Coordinates: 16°43′N 22°56′W
- Area: 219.84 km^{2} (84.88 sq mi)
- Length: 29.7 km (18.45 mi)
- Width: 11.8 km (7.33 mi)
- Highest elevation: 406 m (1332 ft)
- Highest point: Monte Grande

Administration
- Cape Verde
- Municipality: Sal
- Largest settlement: Espargos

Demographics
- Population: 39,700 (2019)
- Pop. density: 180/km^{2} (470/sq mi)

Sal (Portuguese for "salt") is an island in Cape Verde. Sal is a tourist destination with white sand beaches and over 350 days of sunshine a year. It is one of the three sandy eastern islands of the Cape Verde archipelago in the central Atlantic Ocean, 350 miles (560 km) off the west coast of Africa. Cabo Verde is known for year-round kiteboarding, for the large reserve of Caretta turtles which hatch from July to September, and the music of Cesária Évora. Cabo Verde is now the world's largest nesting aggregation for this turtle species, and Sal has the second-largest rookery.

== History ==
The island was discovered on 3 December 1460 and named Chã ("flat"). This name was changed into the current "Sal" when the two large salt ponds (Pedra de Lume and Santa Maria) were discovered. The first three centuries after its discovery, the island was only sparsely inhabited; in 1720 there was a small fishing village near present Palmeira. This changed when the salt industry was developed at the end of the 18th century, starting in Pedra de Lume. Santa Maria was founded in the south of the island in 1830 by Manuel António Martins. During this time the salt industry thrived, with 30,000 tons of salt being exported in the early years. Most of the salt was exported to Brazil until its nationalization in 1887, Portuguese and French salt investors resumed salt production until 1984.

In 1939 Italy started constructing an airport to receive flights from Europe and South America. Construction was halted and ceased around World War II. The Portuguese bought the airport from the Italians and finished it in 1949. Northeast of the airport, workers from São Nicolau Island settled in a village named Preguiça, now part of Espargos. Hurricane Fred struck the island of Sal in late summer 2015, causing damage to houses, tourist facilities and ships.

== Geography ==
The island is 29.7 km long and 11.8 km wide. Its area is 219.84 km^{2} (84.88 sq mi). It is one of the three sandy eastern islands (Sal, Boa Vista and Maio) of the archipelago, with white sandy beaches. The island is fairly flat; its highest point is Monte Grande, at 406 m elevation. The uninhabited islet Ilhéu Rabo de Junco lies near the west coast of Sal. Saline marshes can be found in the Pedra de Lume crater and north of Santa Maria.

=== Climate ===
Sal Island has on average 350 days of sunshine a year. Winds mainly blow from the northeast. However, some days do also have clouds, but they tend to be scattered and seldom bring rain. The 'rainy season' is from July to mid-October, although rainfall is still low.

Climate data for Sal, Cape Verde (Amílcar Cabral International Airport) 1991–2020, extremes 1950–1990
Month	Jan	Feb	Mar	Apr	May	Jun	Jul	Aug	Sep	Oct	Nov	Dec	Year
Record high °C (°F)	32 (90)	30 (86)	33 (91)	33 (91)	33 (91)	34 (93)	33 (91)	33 (91)	38 (100)	34 (93)	33 (91)	30 (86)	38 (100)
Mean daily maximum °C (°F)	25.0 (77.0)	24.9 (76.8)	25.2 (77.4)	25.5 (77.9)	26.1 (79.0)	27.0 (80.6)	28.1 (82.6)	29.6 (85.3)	30.1 (86.2)	29.6 (85.3)	28.1 (82.6)	26.1 (79.0)	27.1 (80.8)
Daily mean °C (°F)	22.0 (71.6)	21.8 (71.2)	22.0 (71.6)	22.5 (72.5)	23.4 (74.1)	24.3 (75.7)	25.4 (77.7)	26.9 (80.4)	27.4 (81.3)	26.8 (80.2)	25.2 (77.4)	23.3 (73.9)	24.2 (75.6)
Mean daily minimum °C (°F)	19.2 (66.6)	18.8 (65.8)	18.9 (66.0)	19.6 (67.3)	20.6 (69.1)	21.6 (70.9)	22.8 (73.0)	24.2 (75.6)	24.8 (76.6)	24.1 (75.4)	22.5 (72.5)	20.5 (68.9)	21.5 (70.6)
Record low °C (°F)	12 (54)	10 (50)	12 (54)	15 (59)	15 (59)	15 (59)	17 (63)	20 (68)	20 (68)	19 (66)	17 (63)	16 (61)	10 (50)
Average precipitation mm (inches)	2.8 (0.11)	0.5 (0.02)	0.5 (0.02)	1.0 (0.04)	0.5 (0.02)	0.0 (0.0)	2.4 (0.09)	12.8 (0.50)	34.5 (1.36)	15.6 (0.61)	1.3 (0.05)	3.4 (0.13)	75.3 (2.95)
Average precipitation days (≥ 0.1 mm)	0.5	0.2	0.1	0.2	0.1	0	0.1	1.2	2.7	1.1	0.4	0.5	7.1
Average relative humidity (%)	69.0	70.9	70.9	70.6	73.3	75.4	75.5	75.9	77.1	74.7	72.9	71.1	73.1
Mean monthly sunshine hours	182.9	175.2	201.5	216.0	204.6	174.0	148.8	161.2	180.0	198.4	189.0	155.0	2,186.6
Mean daily sunshine hours	5.9	6.2	6.5	7.2	6.6	5.8	4.8	5.2	6.0	6.4	6.3	5.0	6.0
Source 1: NOAA, Instituto Nacional de Meteorologia e Geofísica (humidity 1981-2010)
Source 2: Deutscher Wetterdienst (extremes, sun)

Sal mean sea temperature
Jan	Feb	Mar	Apr	May	Jun	Jul	Aug	Sep	Oct	Nov	Dec	Year
23 °C (73 °F)	22 °C (72 °F)	22 °C (72 °F)	22 °C (72 °F)	23 °C (73 °F)	23 °C (73 °F)	24 °C (75 °F)	25 °C (77 °F)	26 °C (79 °F)	26 °C (79 °F)	25 °C (77 °F)	24 °C (75 °F)	24 °C (75 °F)

== Municipality ==
Administratively, the island of Sal is covered by one municipality, Concelho do Sal. This municipality consists of one freguesia (civil parish), Nossa Senhora das Dores, which also covers the whole island. The municipality of Sal was created in 1935, when it was separated from the Municipality of Boa Vista. The municipal seat was originally at Santa Maria, but Espargos became the municipal seat in the 1970s.

The freguesia is subdivided into the following settlements:

- Espargos (city)
- Murdeira
- Palmeira (town)
- Pedra de Lume
- Santa Maria (city)
- Terra Boa

=== Politics ===
Since 2016, the Movement for Democracy (MpD) is the ruling party of the municipality. The results of the latest elections, in 2016:

Party	Municipal Council		Municipal Assembly	
Party	Votes%	Seats	Votes%	Seats
MpD	50.88	7	50.18	9
PAICV	43.58	0	41.14	7
UCID	2.82	0	5.83	1
PSD	0.34	0	0.38	0

== Demographics ==
As of 1832, the population was estimated at 400 people. Until 1960, it was the least populous island of the nine inhabited islands of Cape Verde, with less than 3,000 inhabitants. Since then the population has been growing rapidly, reaching around 40,000 in 2019, which makes it the third most populous island in Cape Verde, after Santiago and São Vicente, and having overtaken Santo Antão and Fogo.

Population of Sal (1940—2015)
Year	Population
1940	1,121
1950	1,838
1960	2,608
1970	5,505
1980	5,826
1990	7,715
2000	14,792
2010	25,779
2015	33,747
2019	39,700

== Economy ==
Sal's main town, Espargos, is home to one of the nation's international airports. Tourism, focused on the area of Santa Maria, has replaced salt and fishing as the main source of income. In 2017, 48.2% of the country's available beds were on the island of Sal. The living standards on the island are among the best in the Cape Verde archipelago. The island's GDP per capita as of 2015 is 495,827 escudos (4,497 euro).

=== Infrastructure ===
The island is home to Amílcar Cabral International Airport, the busiest airport of Cape Verde. The main port of the island of Sal is at Palmeira. The main roads are:

- Santa Maria - Espargos Road (EN1-SL01)
- Palmeira - Espargos Road (EN1-SL02)

== Sports ==
Football (soccer) is the chief sports on the island. It has the Sal Regional Football Association and its main competitions are the Premier and the Second Divisions. Its main clubs are Académica do Sal, Académico do Aeroporto, Juventude and SC Santa Maria. The island's main stadium is Estádio Marcelo Leitão situated southeast of Espargos's center and all regional matches are played. Basketball is the second most popular on the island as well as volleyball, they are played at Polidesportivo do Sal. Académica do Sal is the island's best basketball team. Futsal is also played. In the beaches of the south of the island and its surrounding waters, surfing, windsurfing and kitesurfing have gained popularity for about 25 years and the island is becoming dominant in the nation in windsurfing and kitesurfing.

== Twin towns - Sister cities ==
Sal is twinned with:

- Cascais, Portugal
- Desenzano del Garda, Italy
- Grottammare, Italy
- South Normanton, England

== Notable residents ==
- Maria Alice, singer
- Carlos Andrade, basketball player
- Rodirlei José Ascensão Duarte (Rody), footballer
- Elvis Évora (Elvis), footballer
- Ana Firmino, singer
- Hermínia da Cruz Fortes, singer
- Ildo Lobo, musician
- Mirri Lobo, musician
- Ildo Augusto Dos Santos Lopes Fortes, current bishop of Mindelo
- 4BGSal Islands, artist
- Nelson Marcos, soccer player
- Basílio Ramos, politician
- Héldon Ramos (Héldon), footballer
- Ruben Sança, athlete
- Dona Tututa, composer and pianist

== Gallery ==
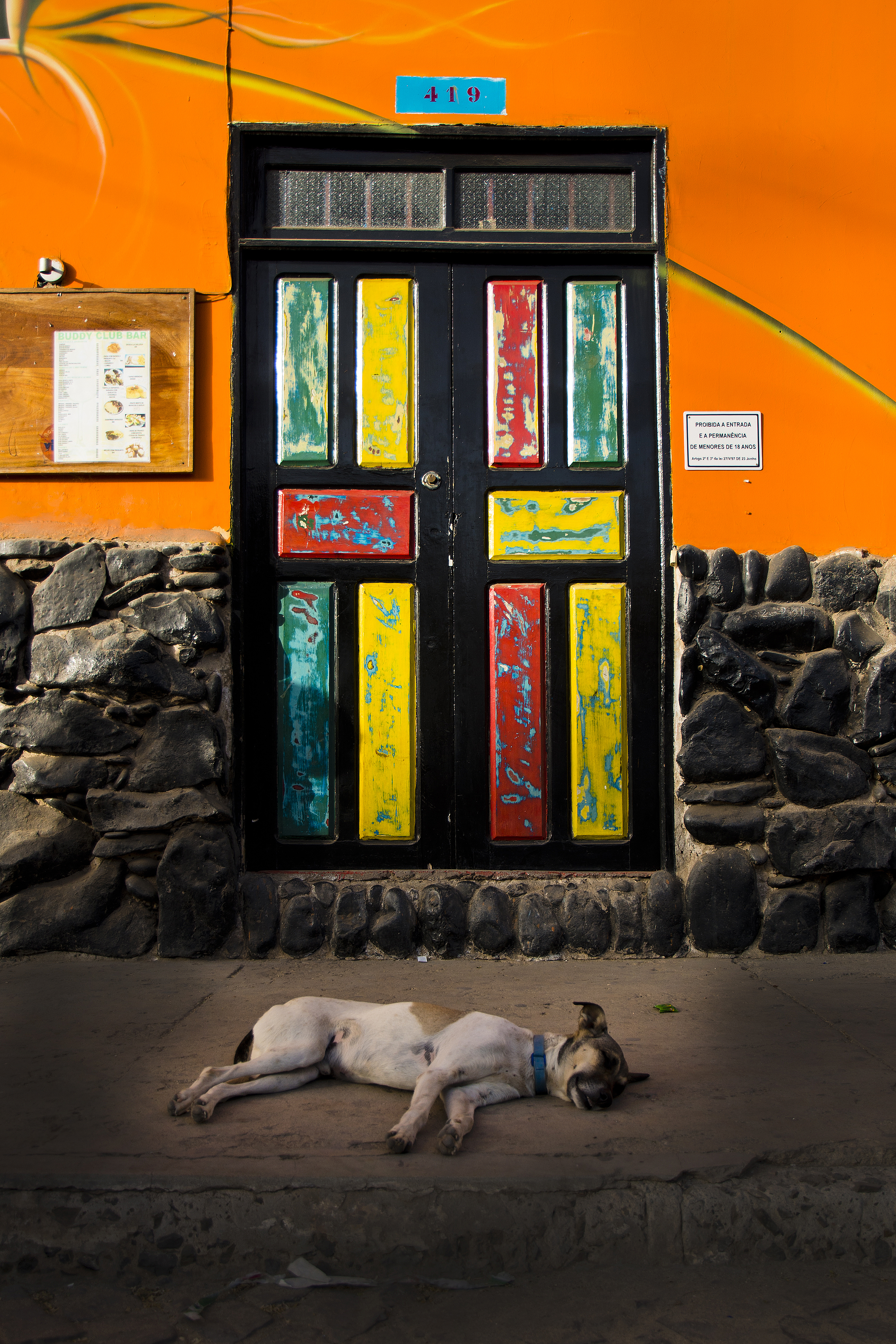
A sleeping dog

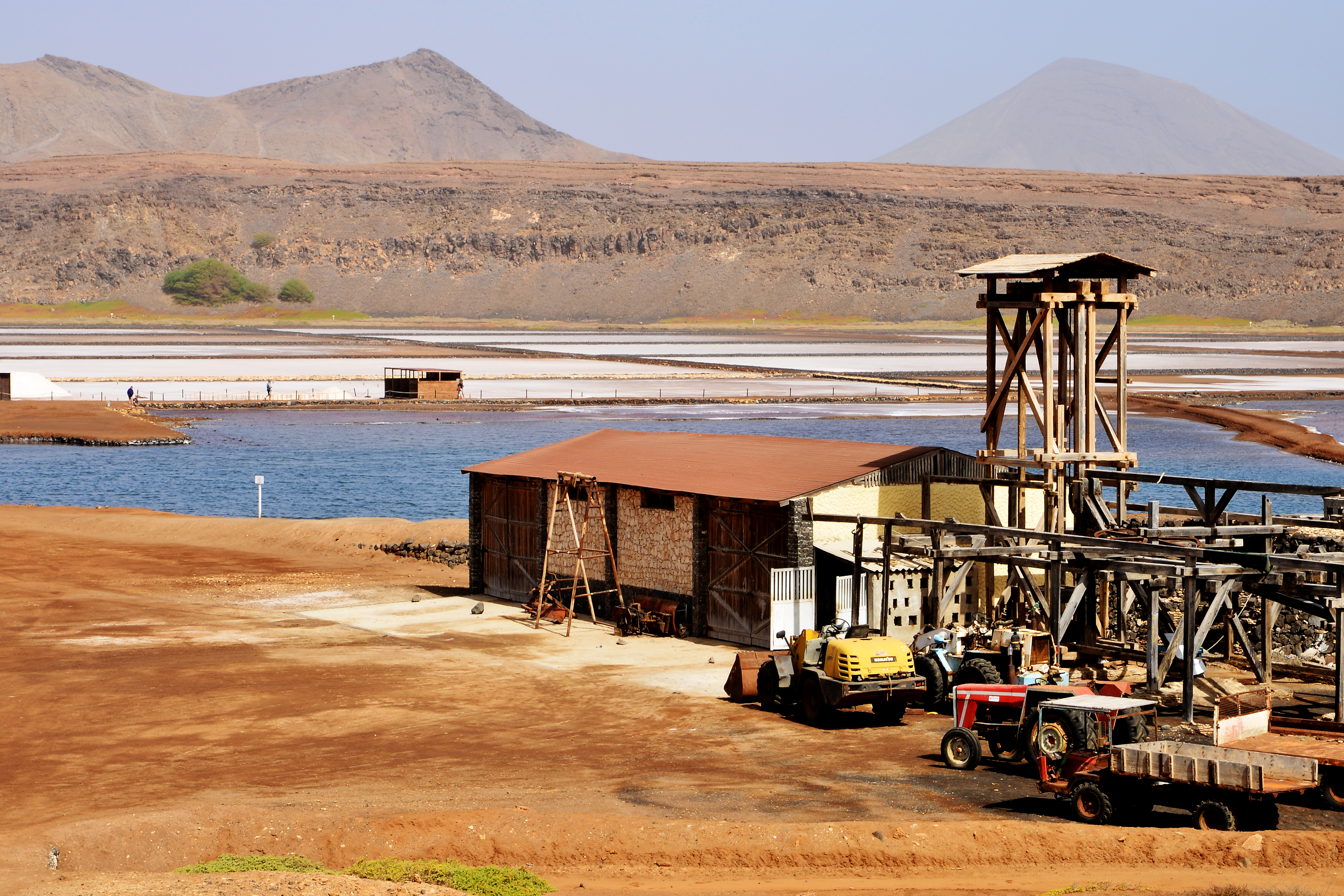
Salt evaporation pond in Volcanic crater (Pedra de Lume)

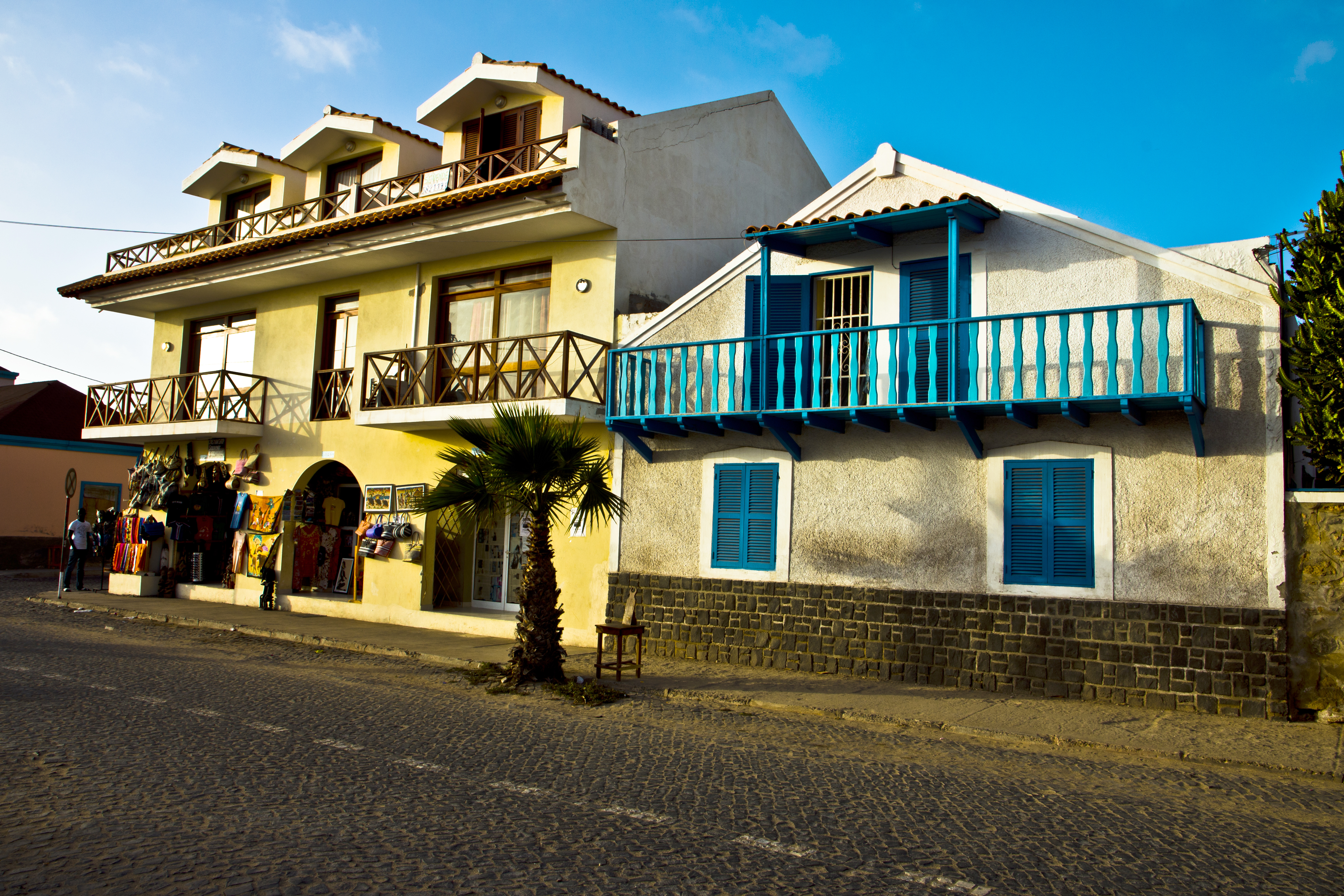
Buildings in Santa Maria

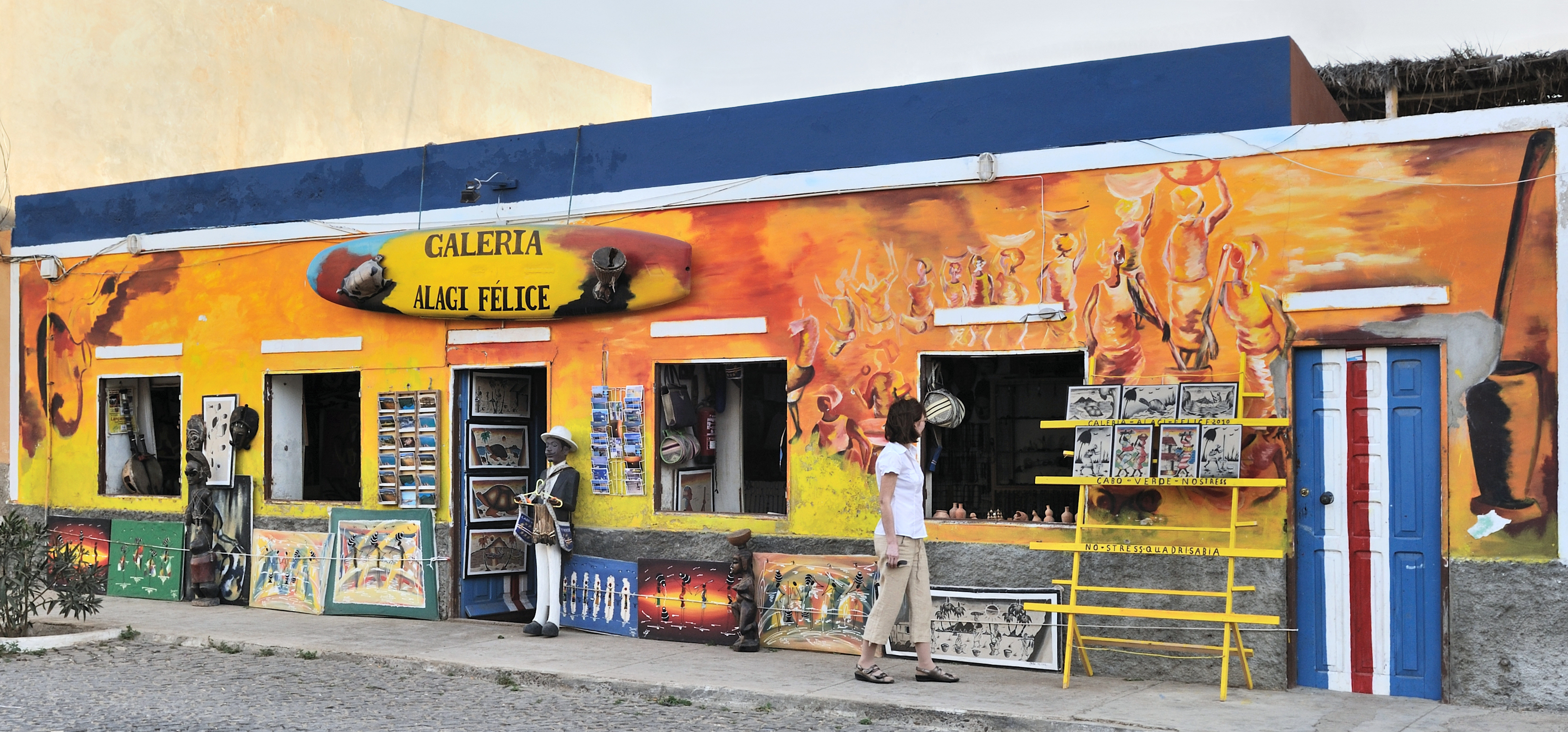
A souvenir shop in Santa Maria

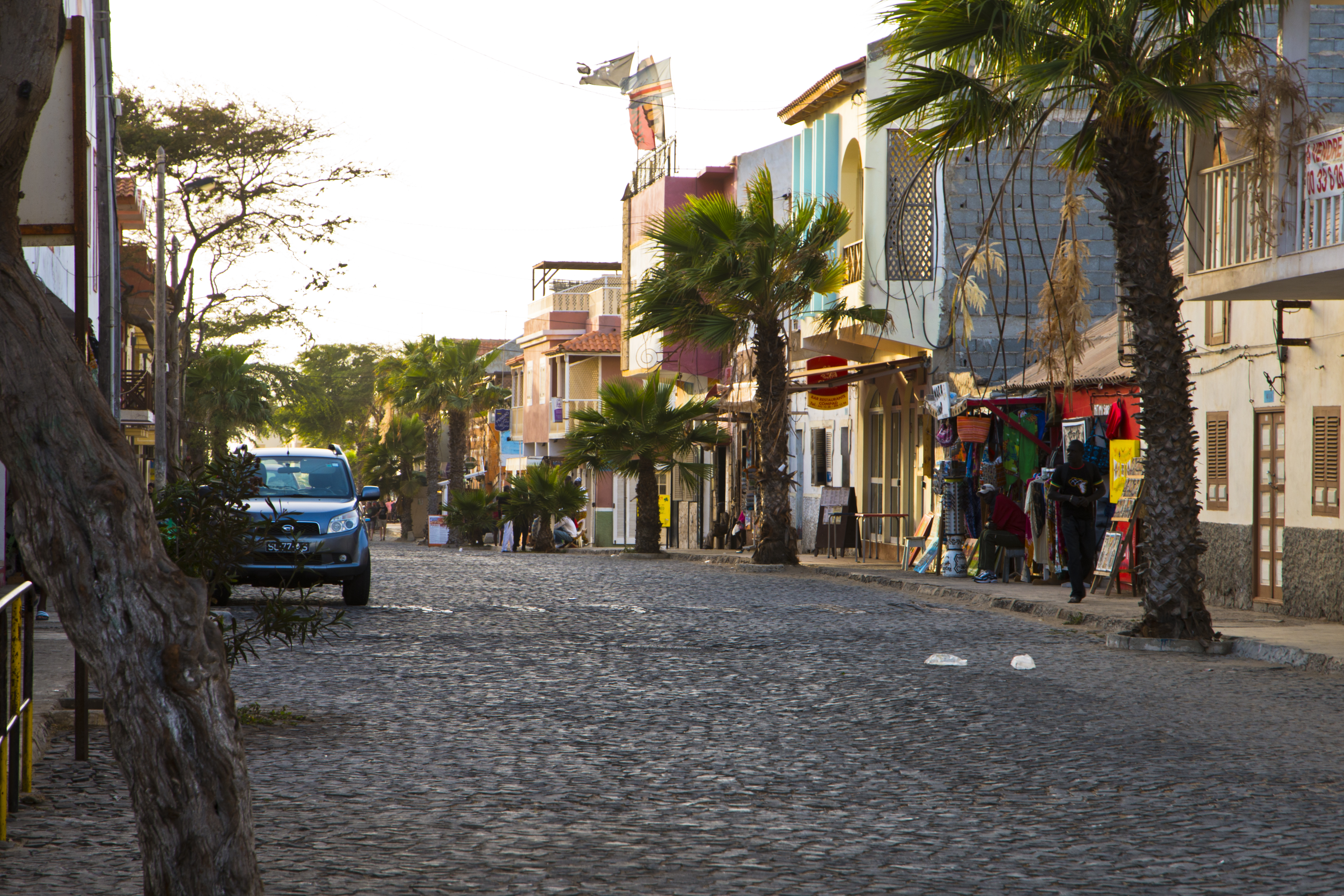
The Mainstreet in Santa Maria, Cabo Verde

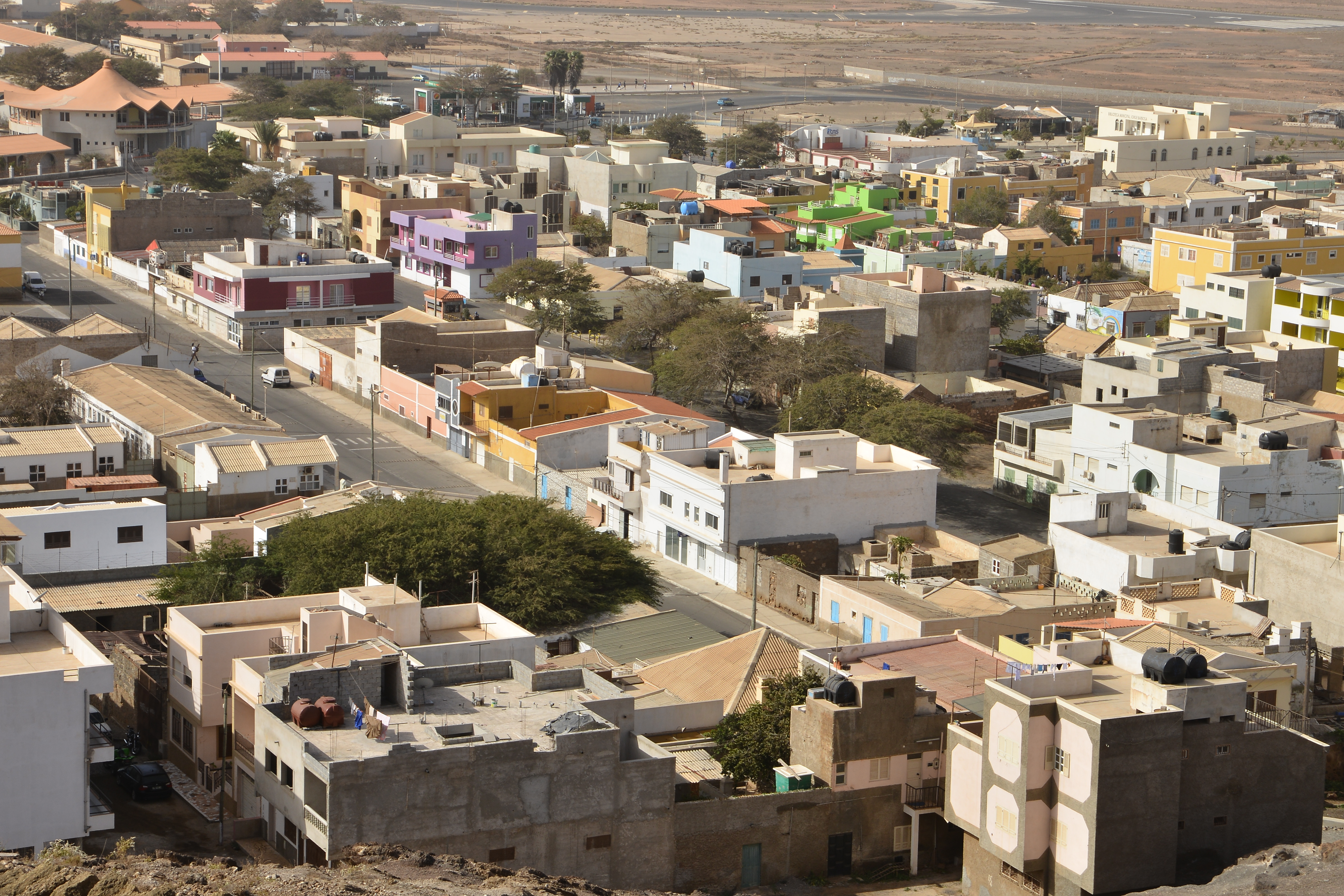
Cityview over Espargos

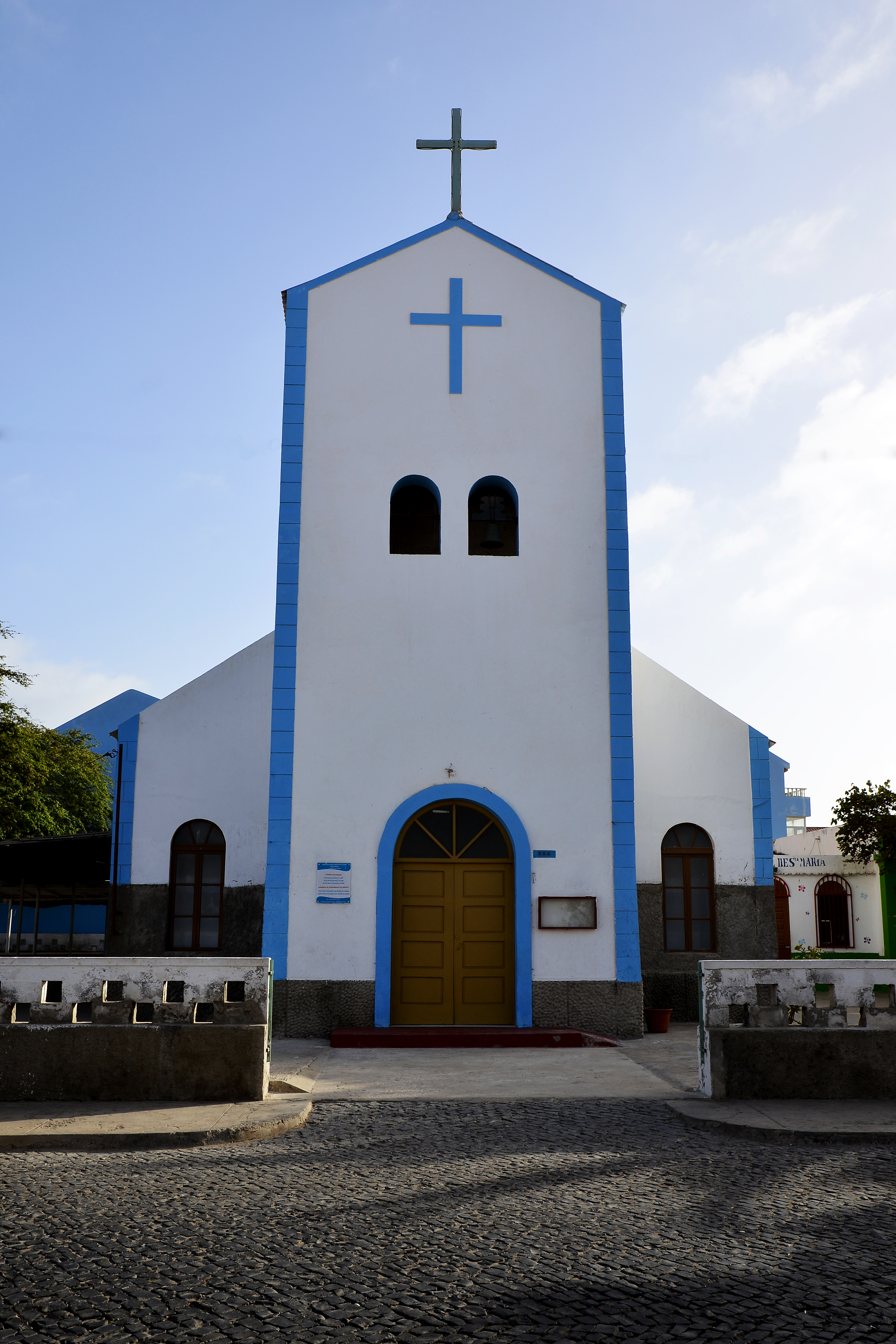
Catholic Church in Santa Maria

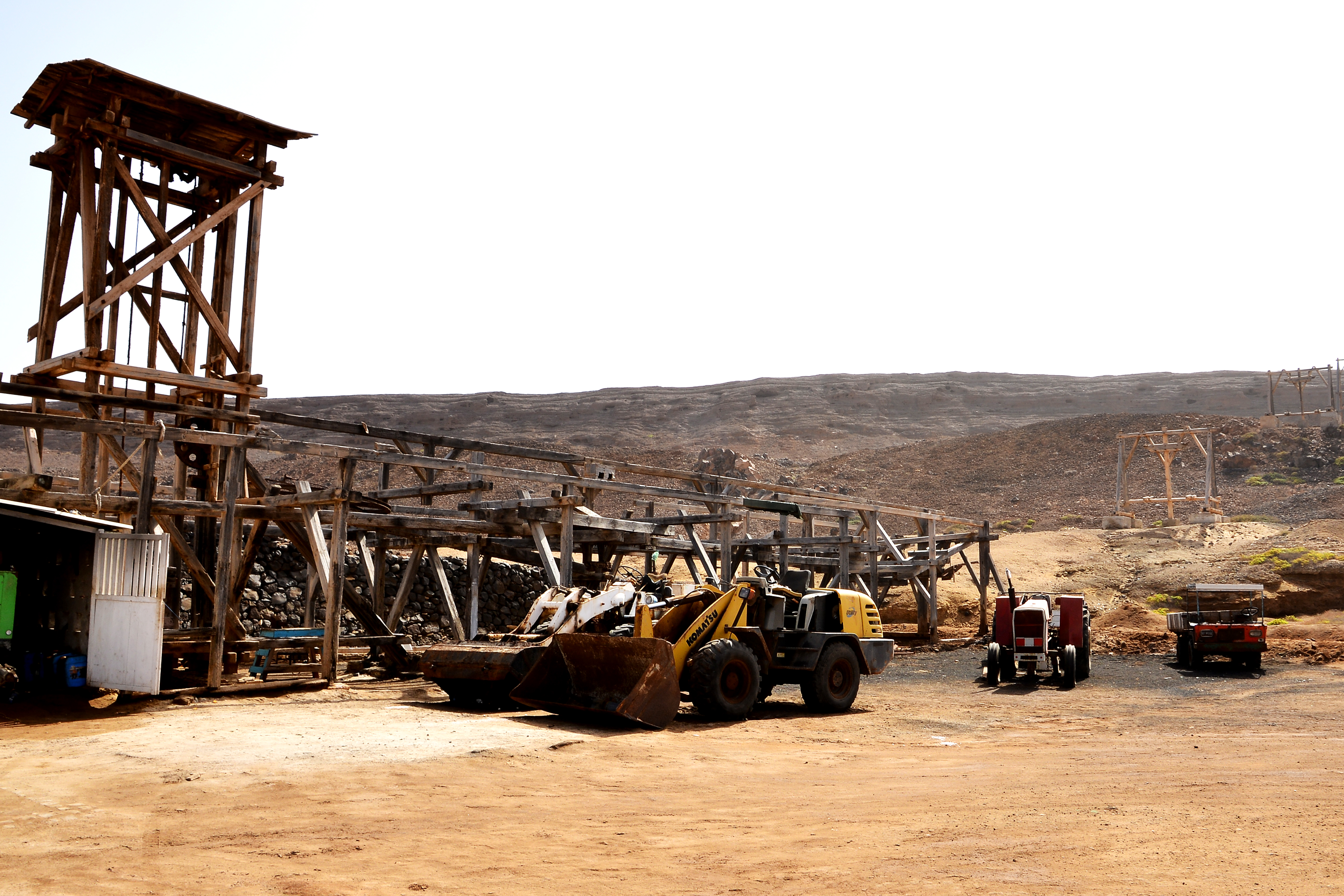
Machinery in Volcanic crater, Pedra de Lume

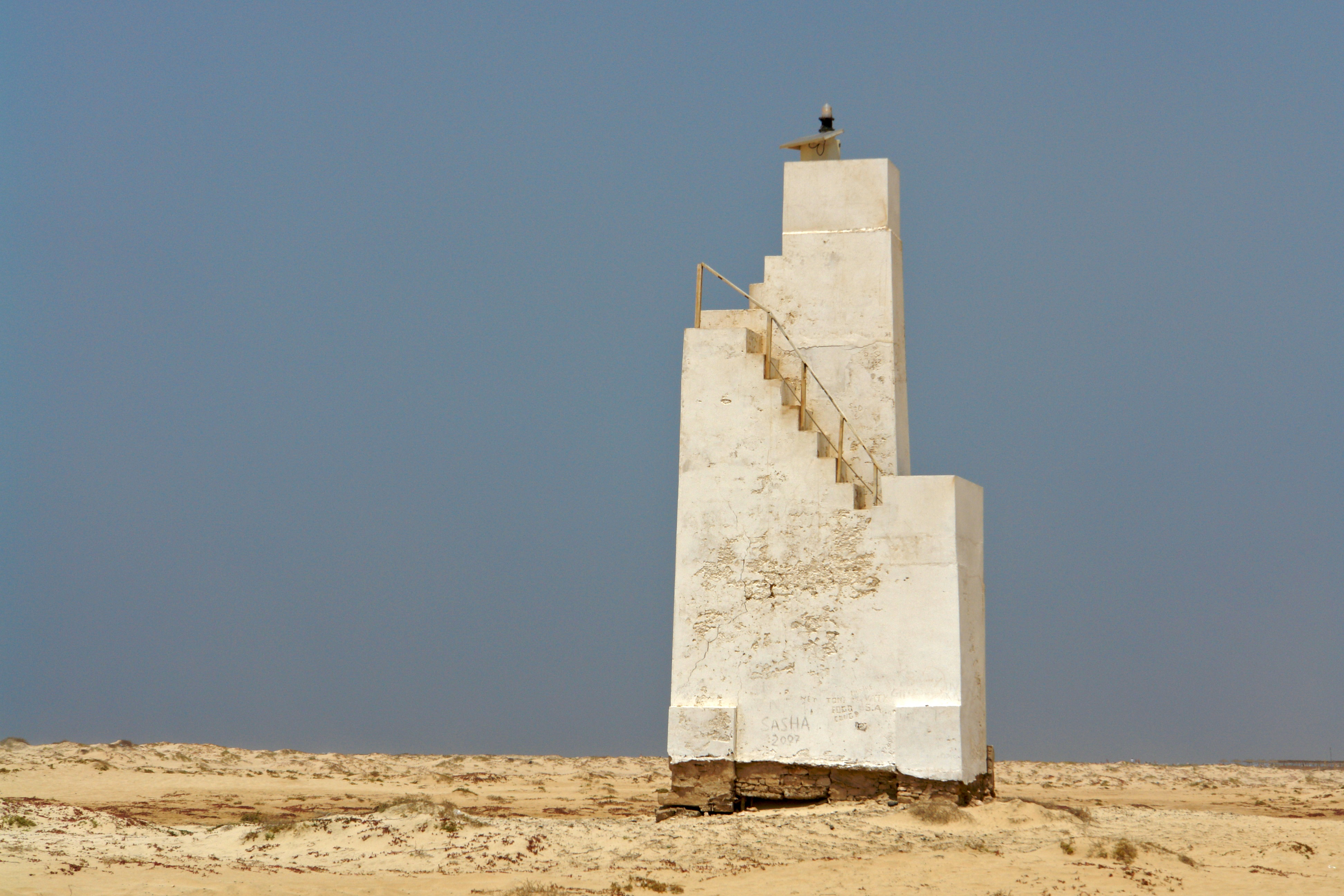
Ponta do Sinó lighthouse

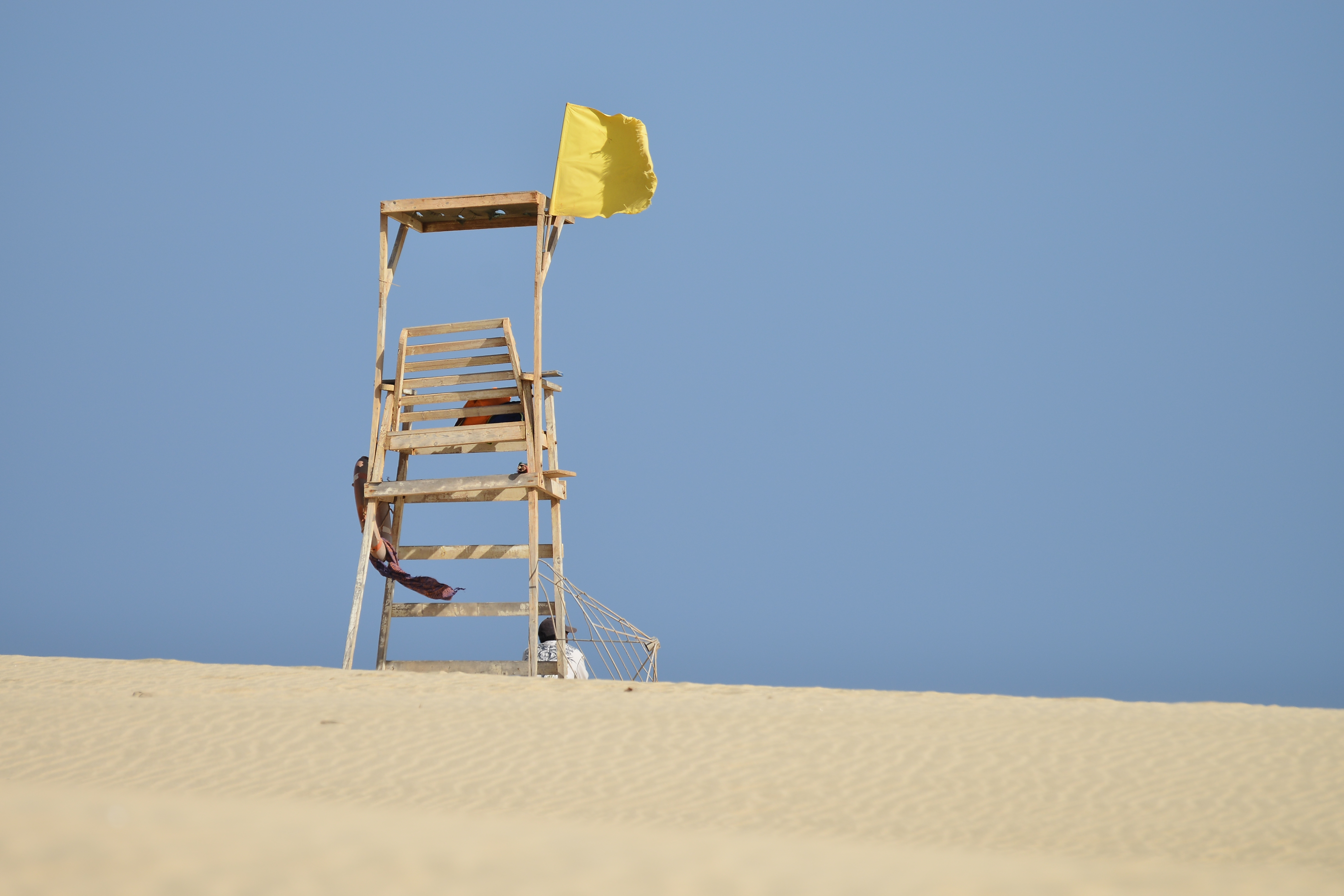
Lifeguard Tower

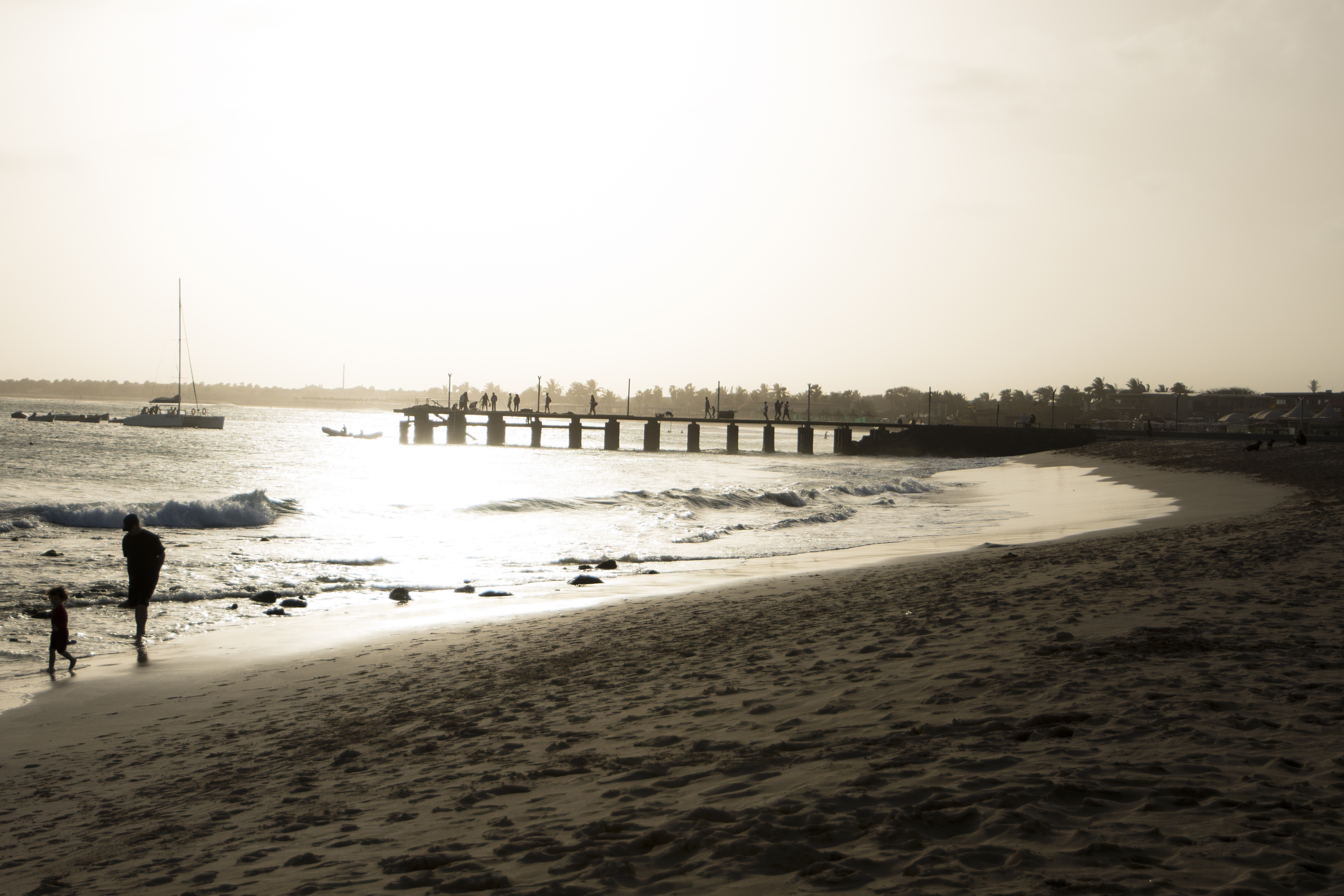
Santa Maria Beach in the evening

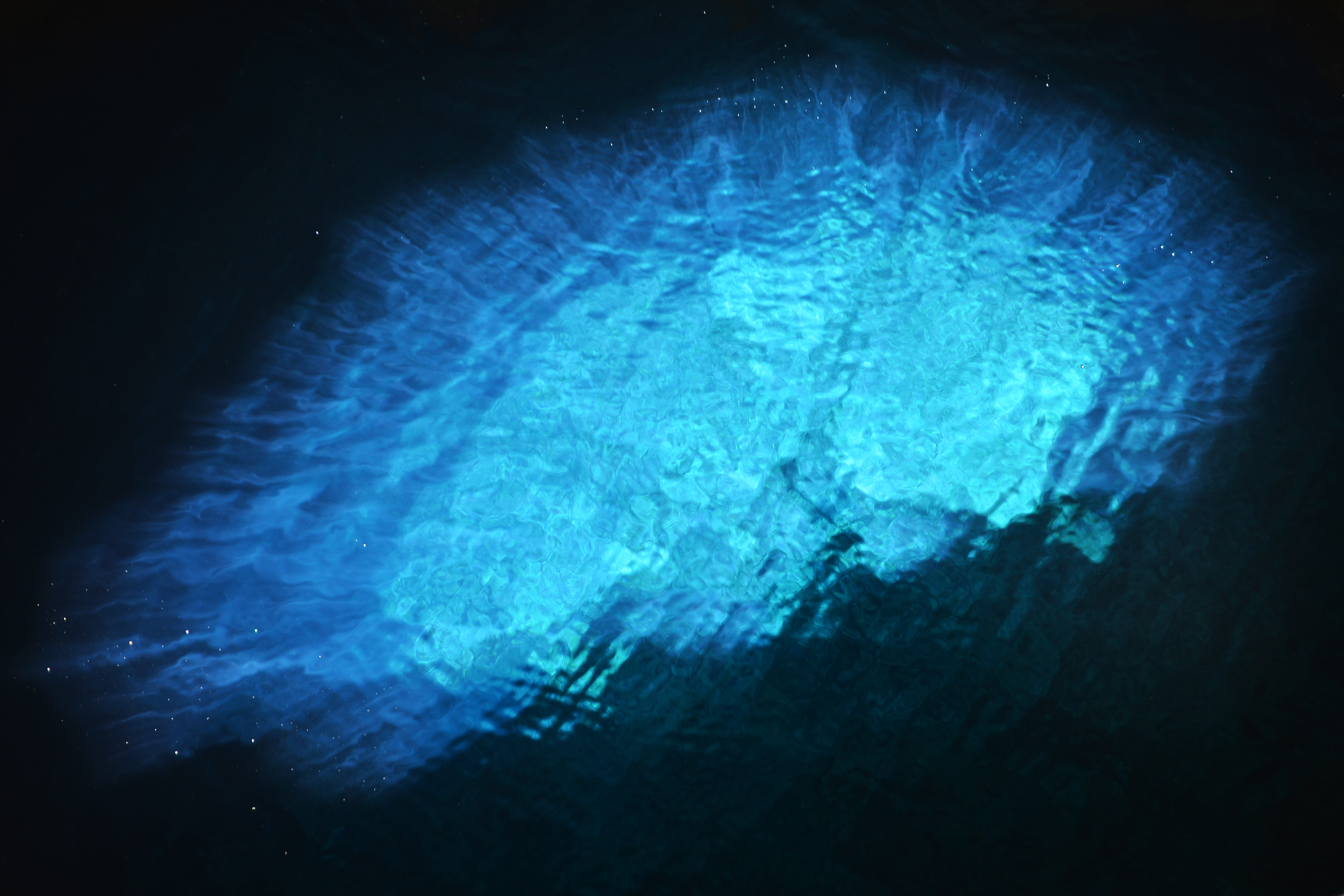
Cave "Blue Eye"

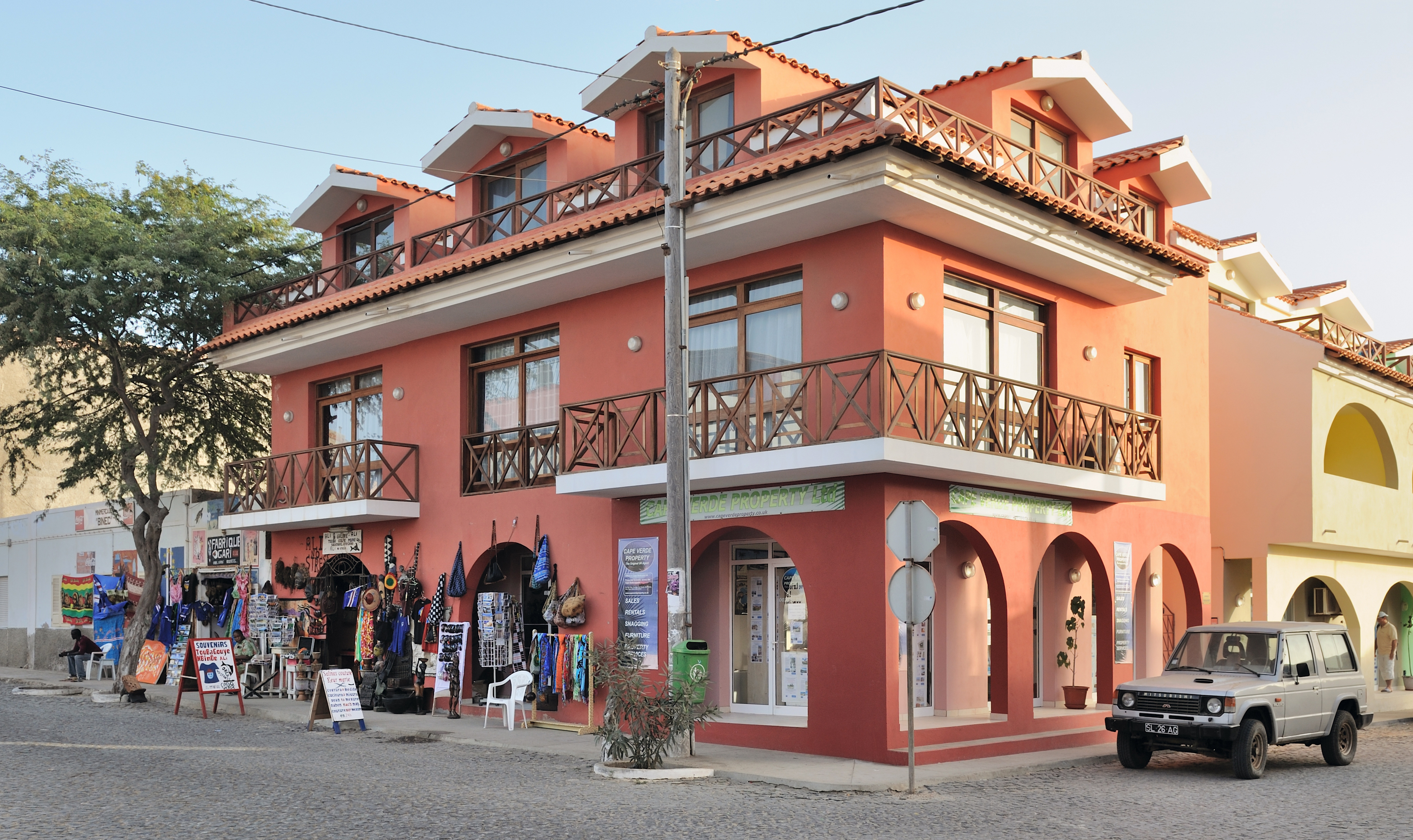
Stores in Santa Maria

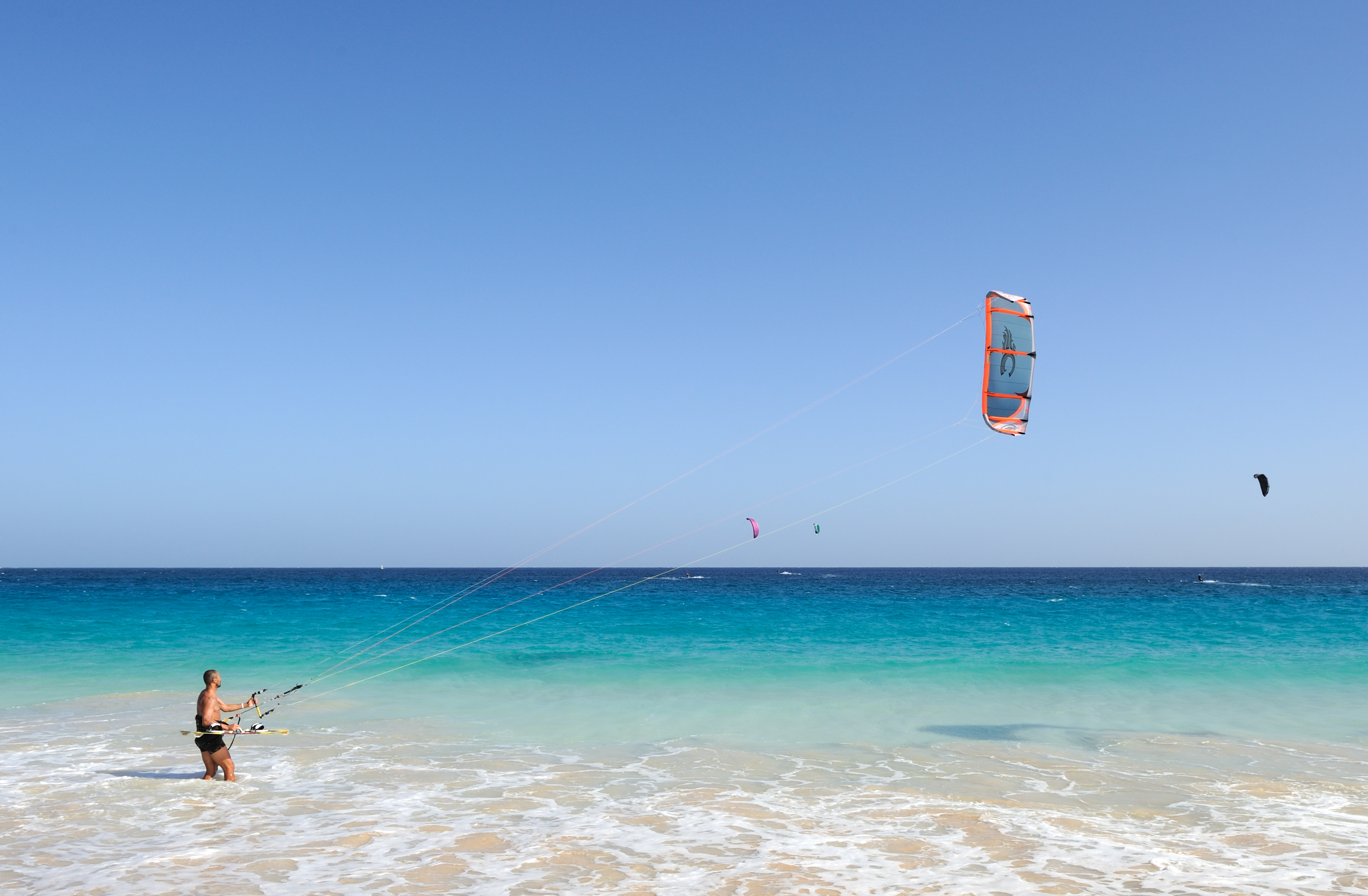
Kiteboarding in Sal, Cape Verde

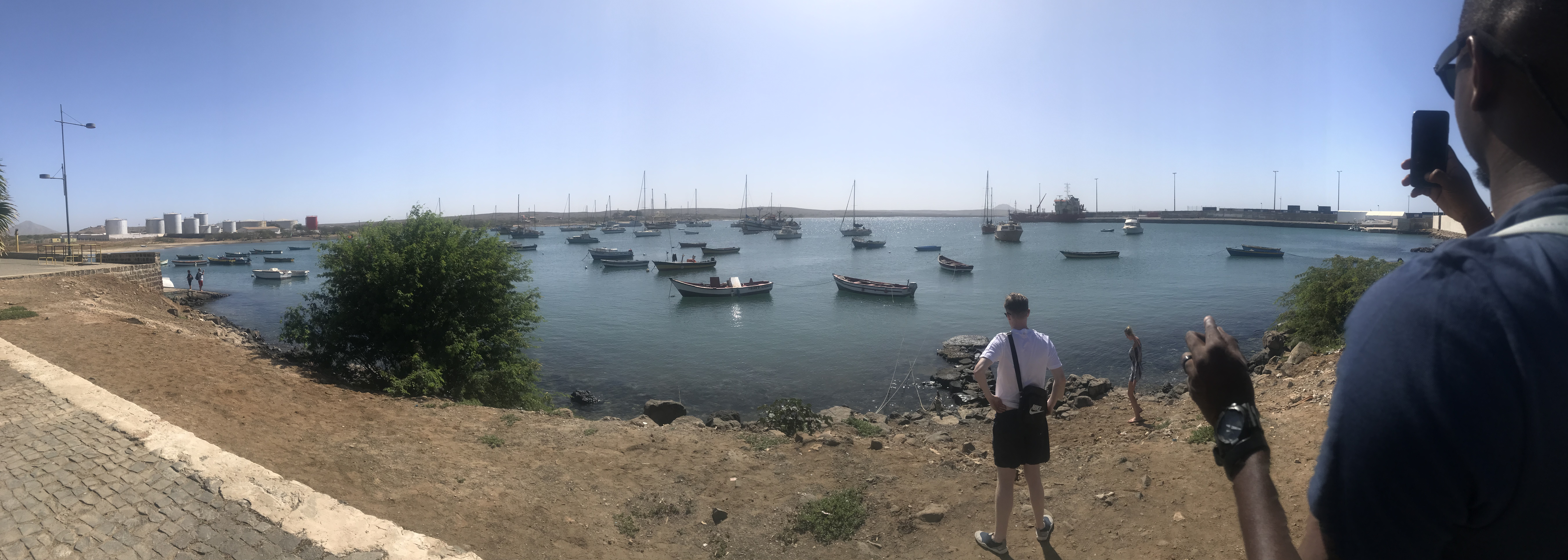
Panorama taken at Palmeira harbour

== See also ==
- Wildlife of Cape Verde
