= Natalie Juncos =

American-born Argentine footballer

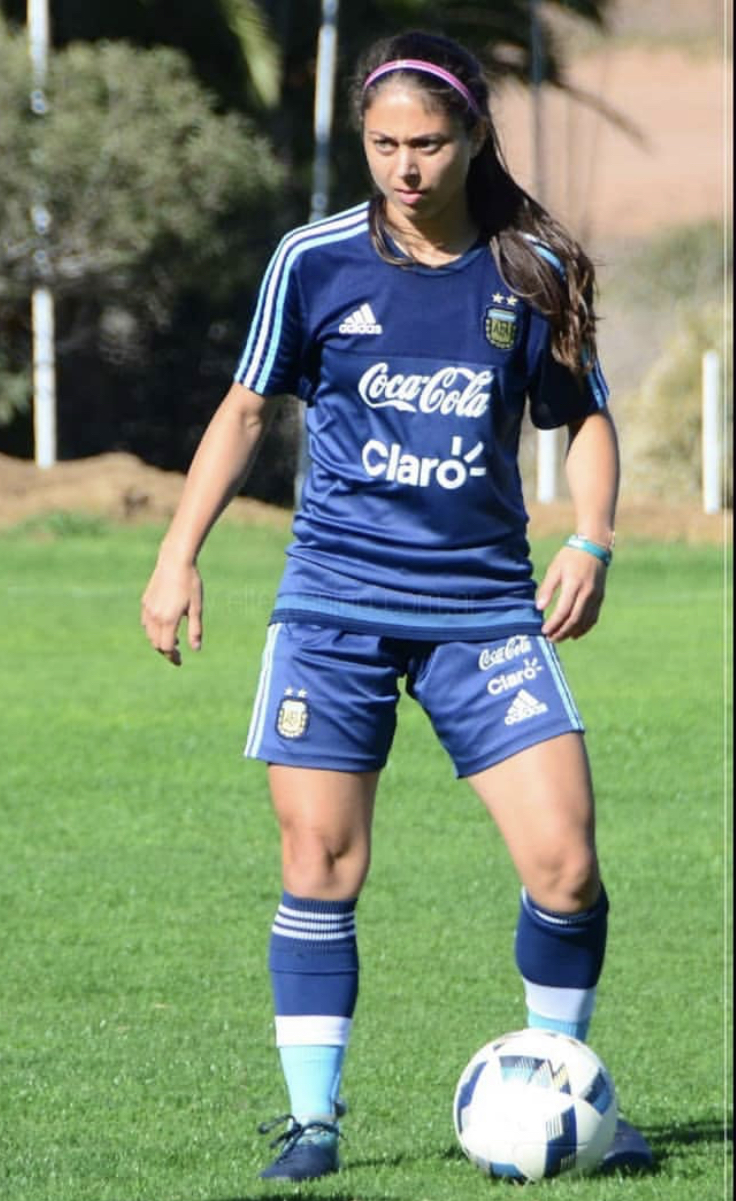

Personal information
- Full name: Natalie Giselle Juncos
- Date of birth: 28 December 1990 (age 35)
- Place of birth: Detroit, Michigan, United States
- Height: 1.60 m (5 ft 3 in)
- Positions: Defender; midfielder

Team information
- Current team: Houston Aces

Youth career
- Lourdes High School
- Northwest Rankin High School

College career
Years	Team	Apps	(Gls)
2009	Florida Gators	2	(0)
2011–2013	Houston Cougars	41	(1)

Senior career*
Years	Team	Apps	(Gls)
2014	River Plate		
2016–2018	UAI Urquiza		
2019–2021	Racing		
2022-	Houston Aces		

International career^{‡}
2018–	Argentina	6	(0)
Medal record
Women's football
Representing Argentina
Pan American Games
Silver medal – second place	2019 Lima	Team
- * Club domestic league appearances and goals ‡ National team caps and goals as of 3 March 2019

Natalie Giselle Juncos (born 28 December 1990) is an American-born Argentine footballer who plays as a defender for Houston Aces and the Argentina women's national team.

== Early life ==
Juncos was born in Detroit to Argentine Olympic swimmers Luis Juncos and Valentina Aracil. She was raised in Rochester, Minnesota and lived in Brandon, Mississippi. Juncos attended the University of Florida, where she played for the Florida Gators women's soccer team. In 2010 she opted to transfer to the University of Houston where she appeared in 41 matches and served as the team captain during her senior year.

== International career ==
Juncos made her senior debut for Argentina during the 2018 Copa América Femenina on 6 April that year in a 1–3 loss to Brazil. She represented Argentina at the 2019 FIFA Women's World Cup in France. The same year, Juncos participated at the 2019 Pan American Games where she won a silver medal as part of the Argentina national team.

== Personal life ==
Juncos is married to an American man from Texas. Her brother Nicholas is also an association football player. Her parents now live in Little Rock, Arkansas.
