= Luis Juncos =

Argentine swimmer

Personal information
- Born: 15 September 1962 (age 63) Córdoba Province, Argentina

Sport
- Sport: Swimming

Luis Augusto Juncos (born 15 September 1962) is an American-based Argentine former butterfly and medley swimmer and current doctor. He competed in two events at the 1984 Summer Olympics.

His wife is fellow Argentine Olympic swimmer Valentina Aracil and their daughter is American-born Argentina women's national football team member Natalie Juncos. His father, Luis Juncos Sr., is also a doctor and worked with Robert Cade at the University of Florida.
