= List of endemic plants of Cape Verde =

The Cape Verde Islands are an archipelago in The Atlantic Ocean off the west coast of Africa, and form the island nation of Cape Verde. The islands are home to dozens of endemic species and subspecies of vascular plants. The Cape Verde Islands are part of Macaronesia, a biogeographical region which also includes the Azores, Canary Islands, Madeira, and the Selvagens.

Plants are listed alphabetically by plant family. Extinct and presumed extinct species are indicated with †.

== Amaranthaceae ==
- Suaeda caboverdeana Rivas Mart.

== Apiaceae ==
- Daucus carota subsp. annuus (Bég.) Mart.Flores, D.M.Spooner & M.B.Crespo
- Daucus carota subsp. tenuissimus (A.Chev.) Mart.Flores, D.M.Spooner & M.B.Crespo – Santo Antão and Fogo
- Daucus humilis (Lobin & K.H.Schmidt) Rivas Mart., Lousã, J.C.Costa & Maria C.Duarte
- Daucus insularis (Parl.) Spalik, Wojew., Banasiak & Reduron
- Daucus ribeirensis (K.H.Schmidt & Lobin) Rivas Mart., Lousã, J.C.Costa & Maria C.Duarte

== Apocynaceae ==
- Cynanchum daltonii (Decne.) Liede & Meve
- Periploca chevalieri Browicz

== Arecaceae ==
- Phoenix atlantica A.Chev.

== Asparagaceae ==
- Asparagus squarrosus J.A.Schmidt
- Dracaena caboverdeana (Marrero Rodr. & R.S.Almeida) Rivas Mart., Lousã, J.C.Costa & Maria C.Duarte – Santo Antão, Sao Nicolãu, and Fogo

== Asphodelaceae ==
- Asphodelus mariolousae Rivas Mart., J.C.Costa & Maria C.Duarte – Fogo

== Asteraceae ==
- Artemisia gorgonum Webb
- Asteriscus daltonii Walp. – Santiago
  - Asteriscus daltonii subsp. daltonii – Santiago
  - Asteriscus daltonii subsp. vogelii (Webb) Greuter
- Asteriscus smithii Walp. – São Nicolau
- Gymnanthemum bolleanum Steetz – São Nicolau
- Helichrysum nicolai N.Kilian, Galbany & Oberpr.
- Launaea gorgadensis (Bolle) N.Kilian
- Launaea picridioides (Webb) B.L.Rob.
- Launaea thalassica N.Kilian, Brochmann & Rustan – Brava
- Nidorella nobrei A.Chev.
- Nidorella varia (Webb) J.A.Schmidt
- Phagnalon melanoleucum Webb
  - Phagnalon melanoleucum var. luridum (Webb) A.Chev.
  - Phagnalon melanoleucum var. melanoleucum
- Pulicaria diffusa (Shuttlew. ex Brunn.) Pett.
- Pulicaria undulata subsp. fogensis (E.Gamal-Eldin) A.Hansen & Sunding – Fogo
- Sonchus daltonii Webb
- Tolpis farinulosa Walp.
- Tolpis glandulifera Bolle

== Boraginaceae ==
- Echium hypertropicum Webb
- Echium stenosiphon Webb – Santo Antão, São Nicolau, and São Vicente
  - Echium stenosiphon subsp. glabrescens (Pett.) Romeiras & M.C.Duarte – São Nicolau
  - Echium stenosiphon subsp. lindbergii (Pett.) Bramwell – Santo Antão
  - Echium stenosiphon subsp. stenosiphon – São Vicente
- Echium vulcanorum A.Chev. – Fogo

== Brassicaceae ==
- Diplotaxis antoniensis Rustan – Santo Antão
- Diplotaxis brochmannii (Rustan) Rivas Mart. – Santo Antão
- Diplotaxis glauca (J.A.Schmidt) O.E.Schulz – Boa Vista and Sal
- Diplotaxis gorgadensis Rustan – Santo Antão
- Diplotaxis gracilis (Webb) O.E.Schulz – São Nicolau
- Diplotaxis hirta (A.Chev.) Rustan & L.Borgen – Fogo
- Diplotaxis sundingii Rustan – São Nicolau
- Diplotaxis varia Rustan – Brava and São Tiago
- Diplotaxis vogelii (Webb) Cout. – São Vicente
- Erysimum caboverdeanum (A.Chev.) Sunding – Fogo
- Lobularia canariensis subsp. fruticosa (Webb ex Christ) L.Borgen
- Lobularia canariensis subsp. spathulata (J.A.Schmidt) L.Borgen

== Campanulaceae ==
- Campanula bravensis (Bolle) A.Chev. – Brava, Fogo, and Santiago
- Campanula cochleromena Gardère
- Campanula feijoana Gardère – Santo Antão
- Campanula fransinea Gardère
- Campanula jacobaea C.Sm. ex Webb – Santiago
- Campanula monteverdensis Gardère – São Vicente
- Campanula vicinituba Gardère

== Caryophyllaceae ==
- Paronychia illecebroides Webb
  - Paronychia illecebroides var. illecebroides
  - Paronychia illecebroides var. nicolauensis Chaudhri – São Nicolau
- Polycarpaea caboverdeana Rivas Mart.
- Polycarpaea gayi Webb
  - Polycarpaea gayi var. gayi
  - Polycarpaea gayi var. halimoides Webb
  - Polycarpaea gayi var. lycioides Webb

== Cistaceae ==
- Helianthemum gorgoneum Webb

== Convolvulaceae ==
- Cressa salina (J.A.Schmidt) Rivas Mart., Lousã, J.C.Costa & Maria C.Duarte

== Crassulaceae ==
- Aeonium gorgoneum J.A.Schmidt
- Umbilicus schmidtii Bolle

== Cyperaceae ==
- Carex antoniensis A.Chev. – Santo Antão
- Carex hansenii (Lewej. & Lobin) Rivas Mart.
- Cyperus sieberianus Spreng. – Santo Antão

== Euphorbiaceae ==
- Euphorbia tuckeyana Steud. ex Webb

== Fabaceae ==
- Lotus alianus J.H.Kirkbr. – Santo Antão and São Vicente
- Lotus brunneri Webb
- Lotus chevalieri Rivas Mart., Lousã, J.C.Costa & Maria C.Duarte
- Lotus jacobaeus L. Fogo and Santiago
- Lotus oliveirae A.Chev. – Santo Antão
- Lotus purpureus Webb
- Tephrosia gorgonea Cout.

== Frankeniaceae ==
- Frankenia caboverdeana (Brochmann, Lobin & Sunding) Rivas Mart., Lousã, J.C.Costa & Maria C.Duarte
- Frankenia montana (Brochmann, Lobin & Sunding) Rivas Mart., Lousã, J.C.Costa & Maria C.Duarte – São Nicolau
- Frankenia pseudoericifolia Rivas Mart., Lousã, J.C.Costa & Maria C.Duarte

== Gentianaceae ==
- Centaurium tenuiflorum subsp. viridense (Bolle) O.Erikss.

== Lamiaceae ==
- Lavandula rotundifolia Benth.
- Micromeria forbesii Benth.
  - Micromeria forbesii var. altitudinum Bolle – Santo Antão
  - Micromeria forbesii var. forbesii
  - Micromeria forbesii var. inodora J.A.Schmidt – Santo Antão and Fogo

== Malvaceae ==
- Malva parviflora var. velutina (J.A.Schmidt) A.Chev. – Santo Antão
- Sida coutinhoi Paiva & Noguiera

== Orchidaceae ==
- † Habenaria petromedusa Webb – Fogo. Last recorded in 1787.

== Papaveraceae ==
- Papaver gorgoneum Cout.
  - Papaver gorgoneum subsp. gorgoneum
  - Papaver gorgoneum subsp. theresias Kadereit & Lobin – Santo Antão

== Plantaginaceae ==
- Campylanthus glaber Benth
- Globularia amygdalifolia Webb
- Misopates orontium var. foliosum (J.A.Schmidt) Ormonde – Santo Antão
- Nanorrhinum dichondrifolium (Benth.) Betsche
- Nanorrhinum elegans (G.Forst.) Ghebr.
- Nanorrhinum webbianum (Sunding) Betsche – Santo Antão

== Plumbaginaceae ==
- Limonium braunii (Bolle) A.Chev.
- Limonium brunneri (Webb ex Boiss.) Kuntze
- Limonium jovibarba (Webb ex Boiss.) Kuntze – São Vicente and São Nicolau
- Limonium lobinii N.Kilian & Leyens – Santiago
- Limonium sundingii Leyens, Lobin, N.Kilian & Erben – São Nicolau

== Poaceae ==
- Eragrostis conertii Lobin
- Hyparrhenia caboverdeana Rivas Mart.
- Urochloa caboverdiana (Conert & C.Kohler) Veldkamp, Potdar & S.R.Yadav

== Polypodiaceae ==
- Dryopteris gorgonea J.P.Roux – Fogo

== Potamogetonaceae ==
- Potamogeton antaicus Hagstr.

== Sapotaceae ==
- Sideroxylon marginatum (Decne. ex Webb) Cout.

== Scrophulariaceae ==
- Verbascum capitis-viridis Hub.-Mor.
- Verbascum cystolithicum (Pett.) Hub.-Mor. – Fogo

== Solanaceae ==
- Solanum rigidum Lam.

== Urticaceae ==
- Forsskaolea procridifolia Webb
