= Diplotaxis =

The scientific name Diplotaxis may refer to:

- Diplotaxis (beetle), a genus of scarab beetle
- Diplotaxis (plant), a genus of crucifer
