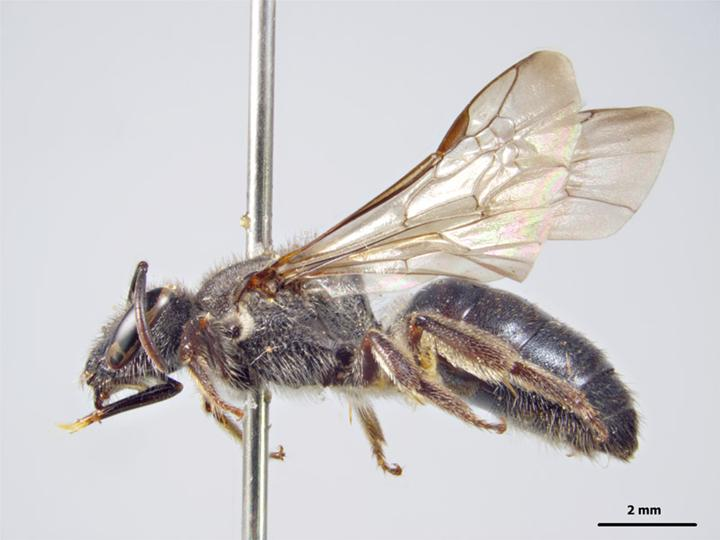
- Female
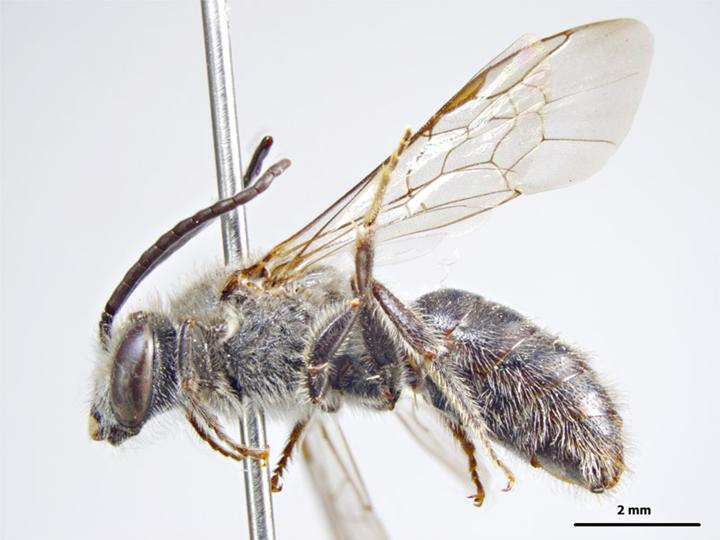
- Male

Scientific classification
- Kingdom: Animalia
- Phylum: Arthropoda
- Clade: Pancrustacea
- Class: Insecta
- Order: Hymenoptera
- Family: Halictidae
- Genus: Lasioglossum
- Species: L. dissimulator

Binomial name
- Lasioglossum dissimulator (Cockerell, 1914)

Synonyms
- Parasphecodes dissimulator Cockerell, 1914; Parasphecodes cervicalis Cockerell, 1915; Parasphecodes zamelanus Cockerell, 1930

= Lasioglossum dissimulator =

Species of bee

Lasioglossum dissimulator, or Lasioglossum (Parasphecodes) dissimulator, is a species of bee in the family Halictidae and subfamily Halictinae. It is endemic to Australia. It was described by British-American entomologist Theodore Dru Alison Cockerell in 1914.

== Description ==
Female body length is about 11 mm. Integumental colouration is mainly black, with reddish markings; with white to brownish hair.

== Distribution and habitat ==
The species occurs in south-eastern Australia. The type locality is Carrum, Victoria.

== Behaviour ==
The adults are flying mellivores. Flowering plants visited by the bees include Hypochaeris, Diplotaxis, Cakile, Leucopogon, Scaevola, Eucalyptus, Leptospermum, Melaleuca, Bursaria, Correa and Pimelea species.
