= Bastard rocket =

Bastard rocket is a common name for several plants and may refer to:

- Brassica pseudoerucastrum
- Diplotaxis muralis, native to Europe, Asia, and Africa
- Reseda
- Sinapis arvensis, native to north Africa, Asia, and Europe
