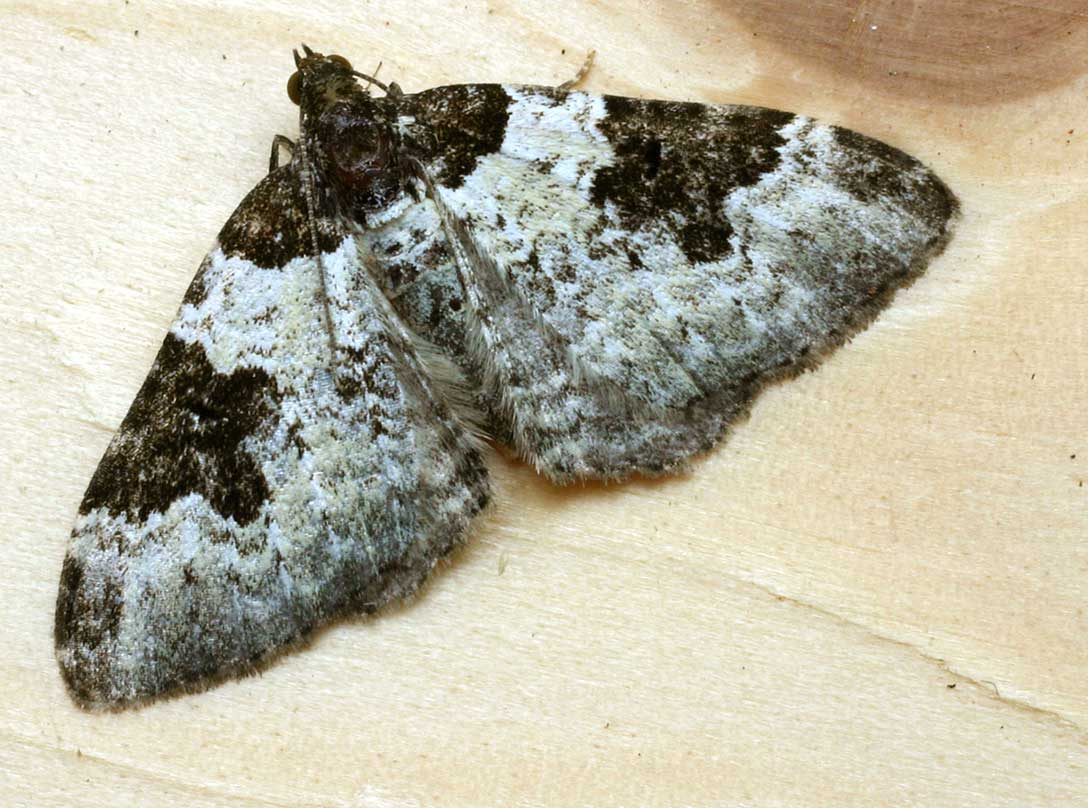

Scientific classification
- Kingdom: Animalia
- Phylum: Arthropoda
- Clade: Pancrustacea
- Class: Insecta
- Order: Lepidoptera
- Family: Geometridae
- Genus: Xanthorhoe
- Species: X. fluctuata

Binomial name
- Xanthorhoe fluctuata (Linnaeus, 1758)

= Garden carpet =

Species of moth

The garden carpet (Xanthorhoe fluctuata) is a moth of the family Geometridae. It is an abundant and familiar species across its huge range which covers the whole Palearctic region from Ireland to Japan and including the Near East and North Africa. It was first described by Carl Linnaeus in his 1758 10th edition of Systema Naturae.

== Description ==
It has a wingspan of 27–31 mm (1.1–1.2 in). The wings are greyish white with three irregular black blotches along the costa of the forewing, the largest in the middle. Occasionally, much darker (melanic) forms occur. "Easy to recognize, in spite of its variability. In the typical form the ground colour is dirty whitish and the median band is almost or altogether obsolete in its posterior half.

- – ab. ochreata Prout has the ground colour ochreous.
- – In ab. neapolisata Mill, the ground colour is much darkened with brown-grey.
- – ab. costovata Haw. has the median band much narrowed and somewhat shortened,
- – deleta Ckll. is merely a rather extreme development of this and need not be separated.
- – ab.immaculata Tutt is a much rarer aberration with the median band entirely wanting.
- – ab. abstersata H.-Sch. shows the opposite extreme of development of the band, which is here darkened completely across the wing; distal area also sometimes darkened.
- – thules Prout is a dark race from the Shetland Islands. The less extreme forms intergrade into ab. neapolisata, but the name strictly applies to specimens in which both the forewings and hindwing are entirely infuscated so that the markings are almost obliterated.
- – sempionaria Rätzer is a small race from the Simplon, of a rather purer white than the type and with the median half-band rather small but rather sharply marked."

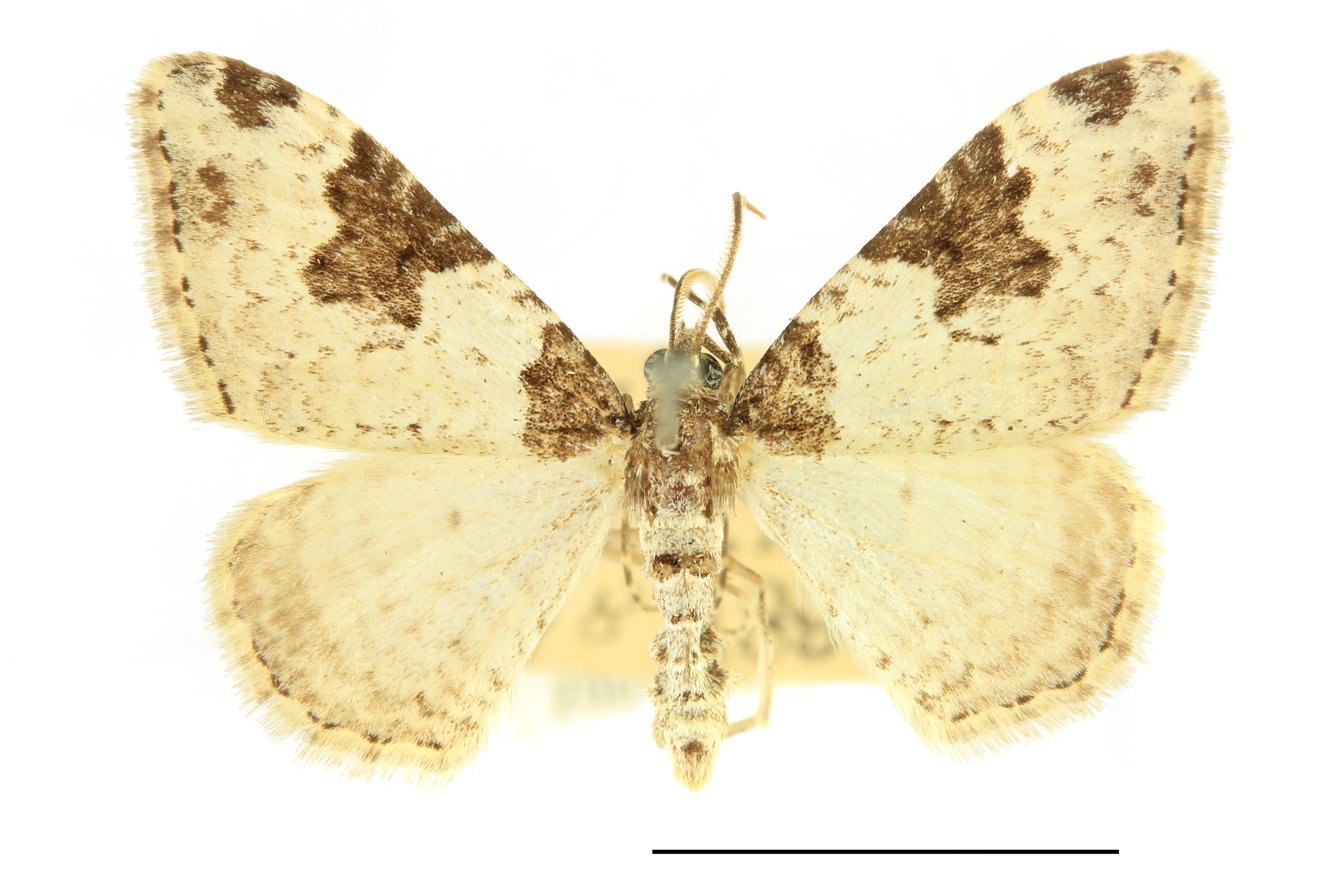
Museum specimen

== Biology ==
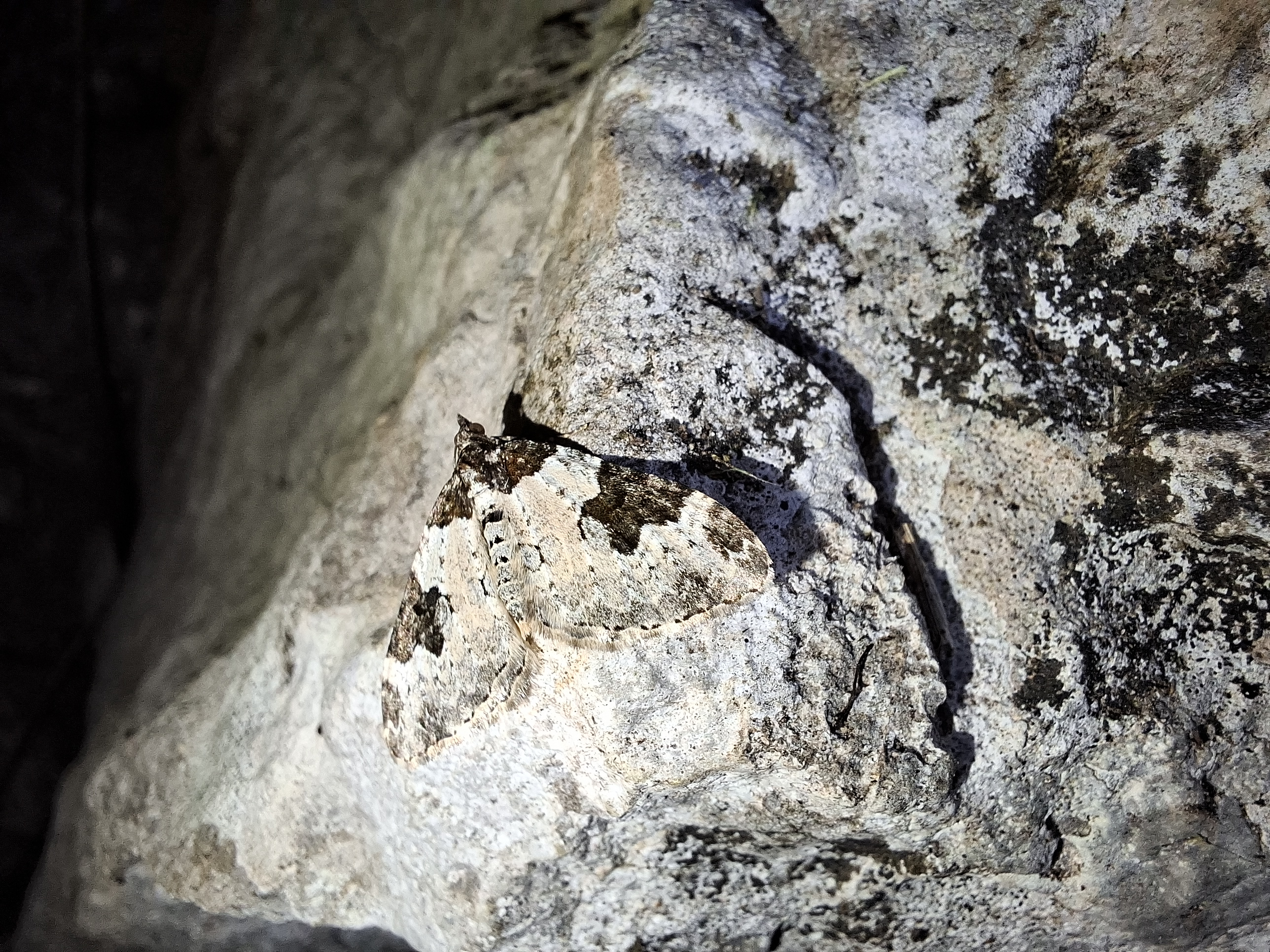
X. fluctuata camouflaging against a dolostone cave interior

The species has an exceptionally long flying season spanning two or three broods, and the adults can be seen any time from April to October in the British Isles. This may vary in other parts of its range. It flies throughout the night and is attracted to light – it is one of the species most likely to be seen at lighted windows.

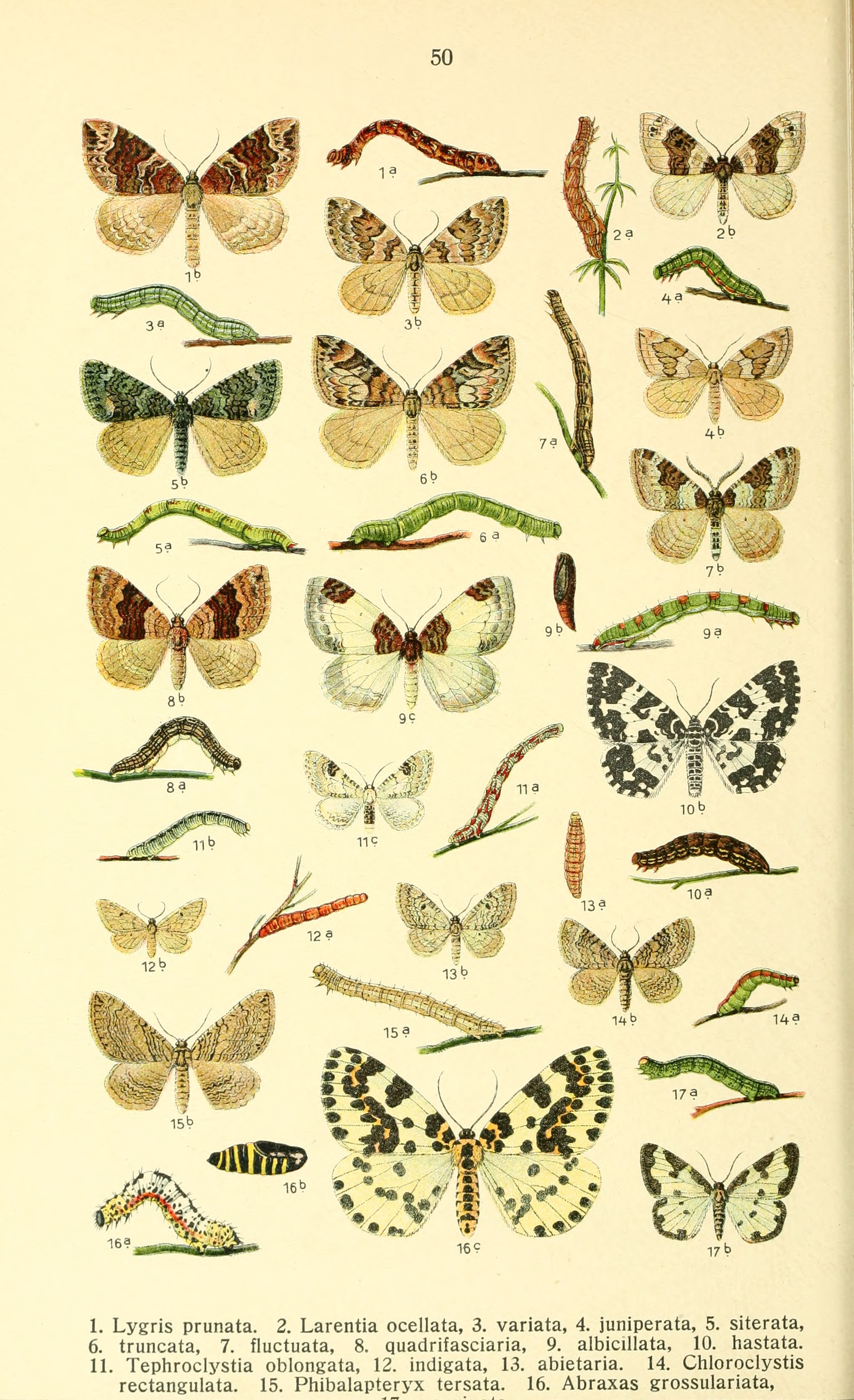
larva and imago depicted by Karl Eckstein in Die Schmetterlinge Deutschlands

The larva is grey or green with pale, diamond-shaped markings along the back. It usually feeds on crucifers: both cultivated brassicas and wild species such as flixweed, garlic mustard, perennial wall-rocket, wallflower, and wild radish. It has also been recorded feeding on nasturtium. The species overwinters as a pupa.
