= Diplotaxis glauca =

Conservation status
- Critically Endangered (IUCN 3.1)

Scientific classification
- Kingdom: Plantae
- Clade: Tracheophytes
- Clade: Angiosperms
- Clade: Eudicots
- Clade: Rosids
- Order: Brassicales
- Family: Brassicaceae
- Genus: Diplotaxis
- Species: D. glauca

Binomial name
- Diplotaxis glauca (Webb) O.E.Schulz, 1916

Synonyms
- Sinapidendron glaucum Webb

Species of flowering plant

Diplotaxis glauca is a species of flowering plants of the family Brassicaceae. The species is endemic to Cape Verde. It is listed as a critically endangered plant by the IUCN. The plant was named by Otto Eugen Schulz in 1916. The local name of the species is mostarda-brabo (wild mustard), a name that may also refer to the related species Diplotaxis gracilis.

== Distribution and ecology ==
Diplotaxis glauca is restricted to the islands of Sal and Boa Vista.
