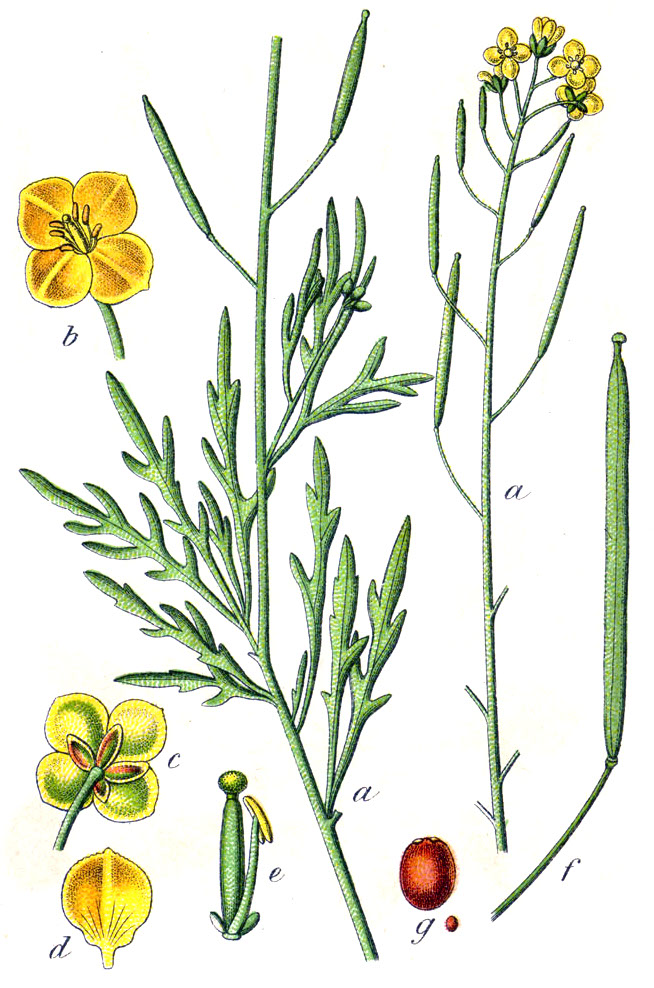

Scientific classification
- Kingdom: Plantae
- Clade: Tracheophytes
- Clade: Angiosperms
- Clade: Eudicots
- Clade: Rosids
- Order: Brassicales
- Family: Brassicaceae
- Genus: Diplotaxis
- Species: D. tenuifolia

Binomial name
- Diplotaxis tenuifolia (L.) DC.

= Diplotaxis tenuifolia =

Species of flowering plant

Diplotaxis tenuifolia is a species of flowering plant in the mustard family known by the common name perennial wall-rocket. It is native to Europe and western Asia, where it grows on disturbed ground and roadsides, and it can now be found throughout much of the temperate world where it has naturalized. In recent years it has increasingly been cultivated to produce salad leaves, which are marketed as wild rocket in Britain or arugula in the U.S. It is easily confused with garden rocket, which has similar uses.

== Description ==
Perennial wall-rocket is a glabrous herb with an erect or sprawling habit, that grows up to 1.3 m tall, with a solid, almost woody terete stem and spreading branches. The deeply pinnate leaves are up to 12 cm long and often rather fleshy, with a peppery taste and a musty smell.

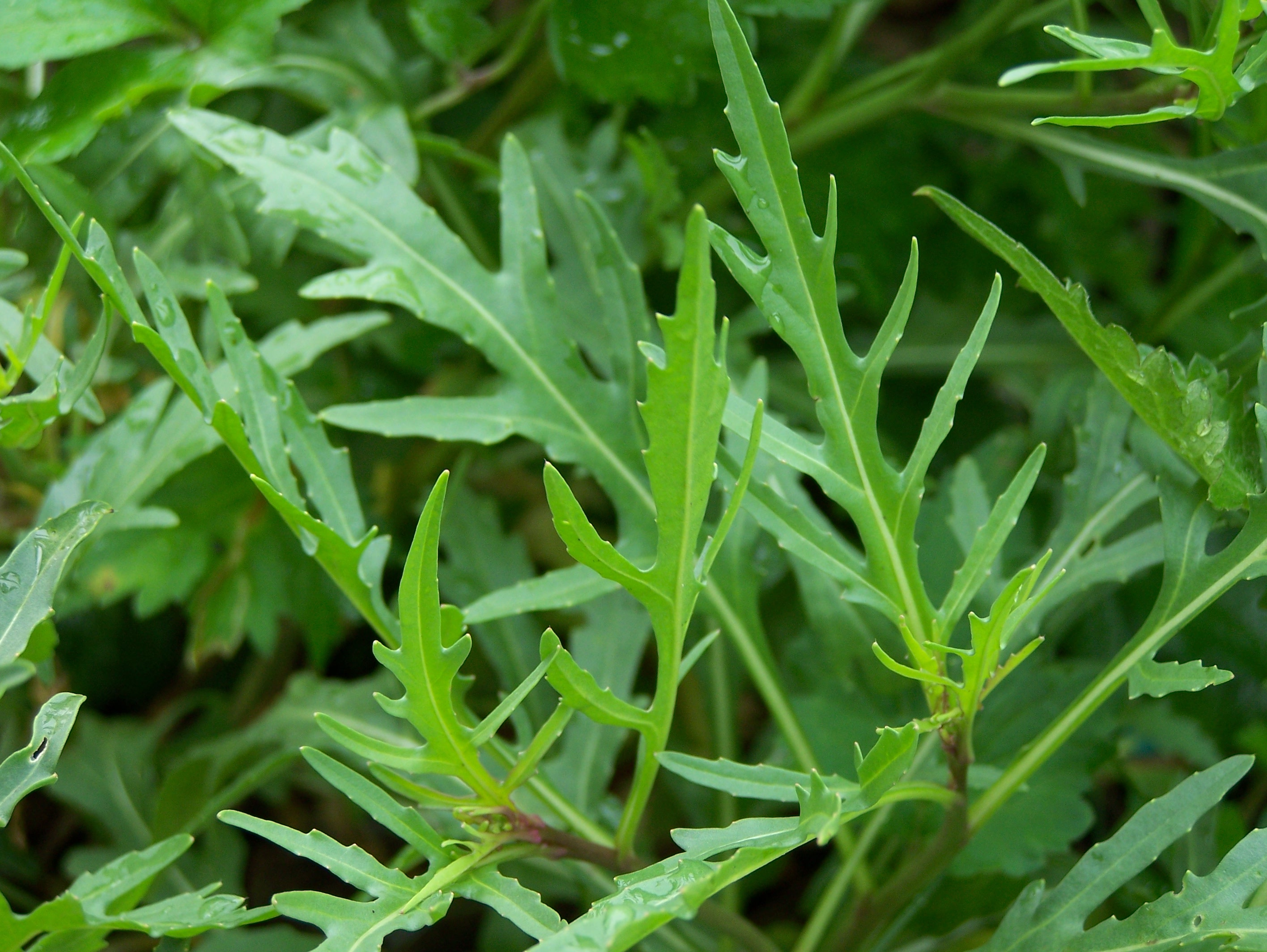
The leaves are typically deeply divided, almost pinnate

In the British Isles, it flowers from May to September (or through October in a warm year). In Spain, it can be seen flowering between April and December. The inflorescence is a branched raceme up to 30 cm long with up to 30 flowers, each of which has 4 free bright yellow petals up to 15 mm long, and 4 free yellow/brown sepals up to 7.5 mm long. Each flower has 6 stamens and a single style.

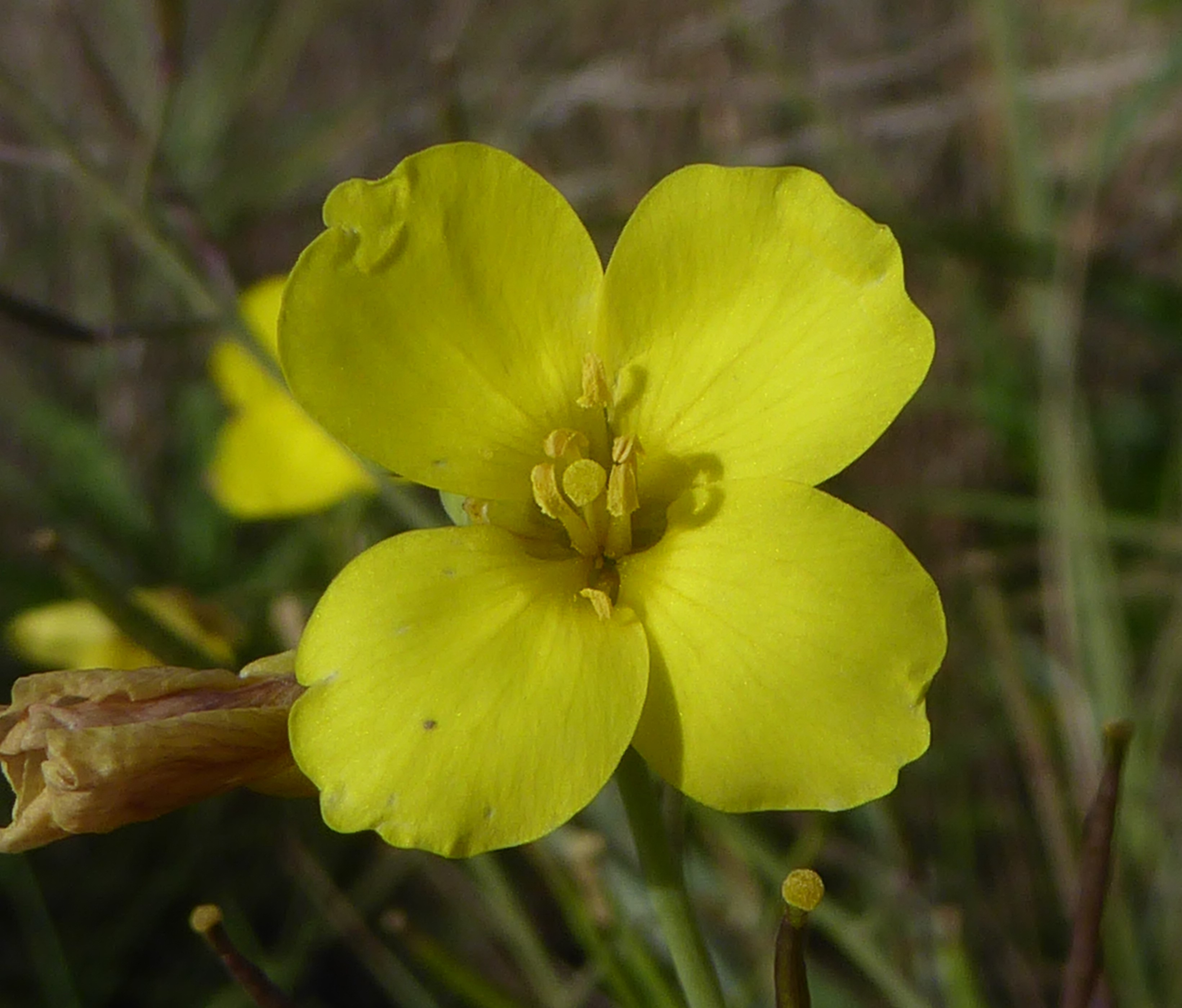
Front view of a flower

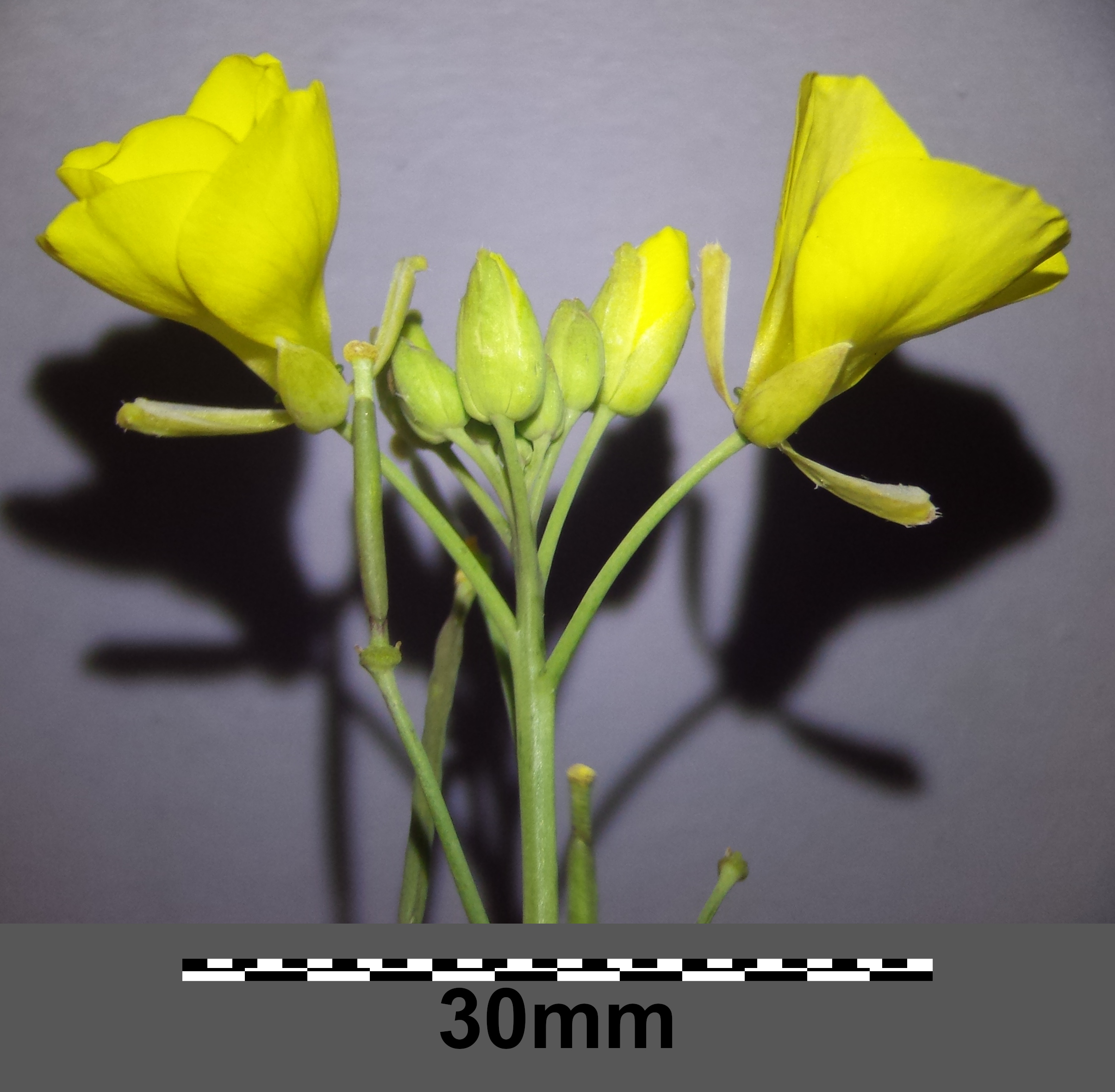
Side view of the flowers and buds

The fruit is a straight, flat silique (pod) up to five centimeters long. The pedicels are shorter than the fruits and ascend at an acute angle to the stem. Above the receptacle is a short (2 mm) stalk (or stipe) below the pod (a useful feature for separating this species from annual wall-rocket). The seeds are arranged in 2 rows, or staggered in a zigzag pattern, towards the centre of the pod, which in turn consists of 2 valves, so a cross-section of the fruit shows 4 seeds in total. This is a distinguishing feature of the genus Diplotaxis, although it is not always easy to see, as plants are not self-pollinating, so ripe seeds do not always develop.

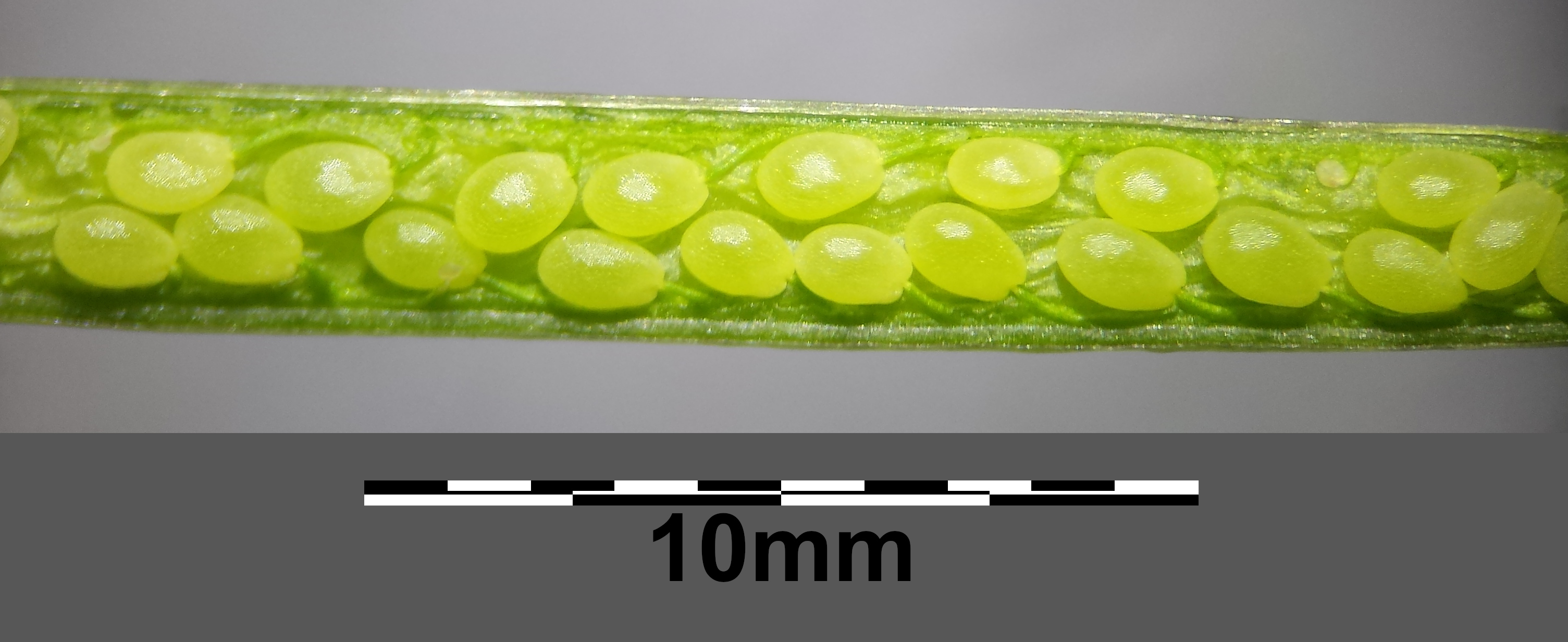
The seeds are arranged in two rows within each valve of the fruit

== Taxonomy ==
The original name (basionym) of perennial wall-rocket is Sisymbrium tenuifolium, published by Linnaeus in 1755, but it was transferred to the new genus Diplotaxis by de Candolle in 1821. It has been given many other names (synonyms) over the years, within the diverse genera Arabis (rockcresses), Brassica (mustards), Crucifera, Eruca (rockets), Erysimum (wallflowers) and Sinapis (charlock), which reflects the complex history of crucifer taxonomy. A full list is maintained by the Catalogue of Life Partnership.

There is only one currently recognised subspecies: Diplotaxis tenuifolia subsp. cretacea (Kotov) Sobr.-Vesp., which was described in 1996 and which is restricted to Ukraine and western Russia.

D. tenuifolia is assumed to have hybridised with D. viminea resulting in D. muralis. It has also been hybridised with Raphanus sativus.

The chromosome number is 2n = 22 (based on British material).

The generic name Diplotaxis comes from the Ancient Greek, διπλός (diplos) = twofold, or double; and τάσσω, τάσσειν (tasso, tassein), which means to put into order, or to draw up in a line (as with troops before a battle). It refers to the double row of seeds in each part of the fruit, which distinguishes this genus from others within the Brassicaceae. The specific epithet tenuifolia simply means "narrow-leafed".

The common name "rocket" is a corruption of the Italian word ruchetta, which describes various cruciferous plants. This species is also sometimes called wild rocket, sand rocket, Lincoln weed (mainly in Australia) and white rocket; the seeds are sometimes marketed as "wild Italian arugula" or "sylvetta arugula".

== Identification ==
In Britain it is most likely to be confused with annual wall-rocket, but it does not have a basal rosette, the leaves are divided more than halfway to the midrib, and the fruit has a short stalk (stipe) above the sepal scars.

The Diplotaxis species can be separated from most other crucifers by the double row of seeds in each valve of the fruit (although this is a difficult feature to see in unfertilised plants) and a seedless beak to the silique.

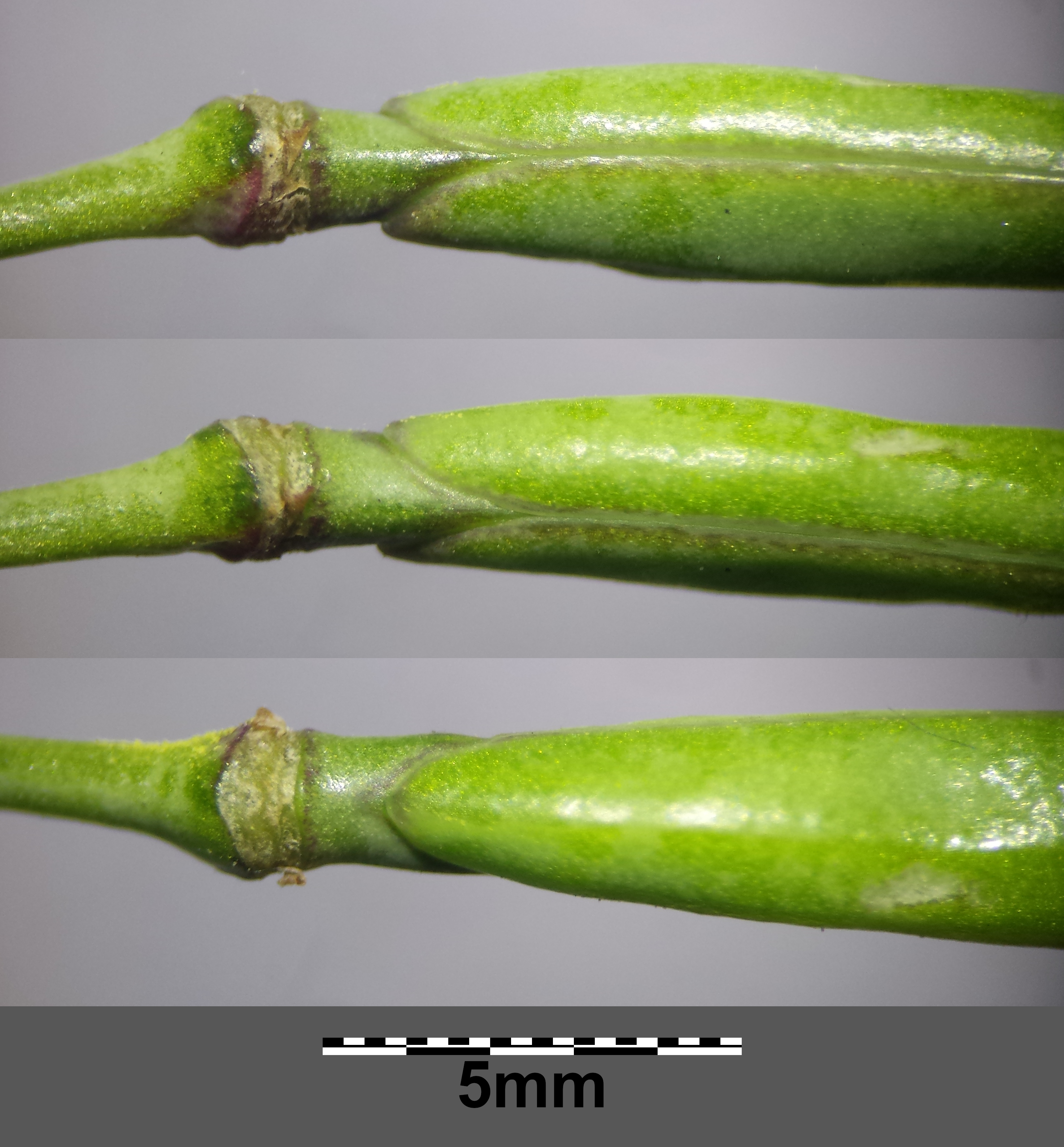
The short stipe below the fruit is a useful identification feature

== Distribution ==
It is native to parts of Europe, reaching in the east to Turkey and Syria. It is extinct from Morocco and Algeria, but has been introduced in a number of regions: Cyprus, the Caucasus, the Levant, Yemen, Japan, Australia, New Zealand, New Caledonia, Canada (Ontario, Quebec and Nova Scotia), the United States, Costa Rica, Argentina and Uruguay.

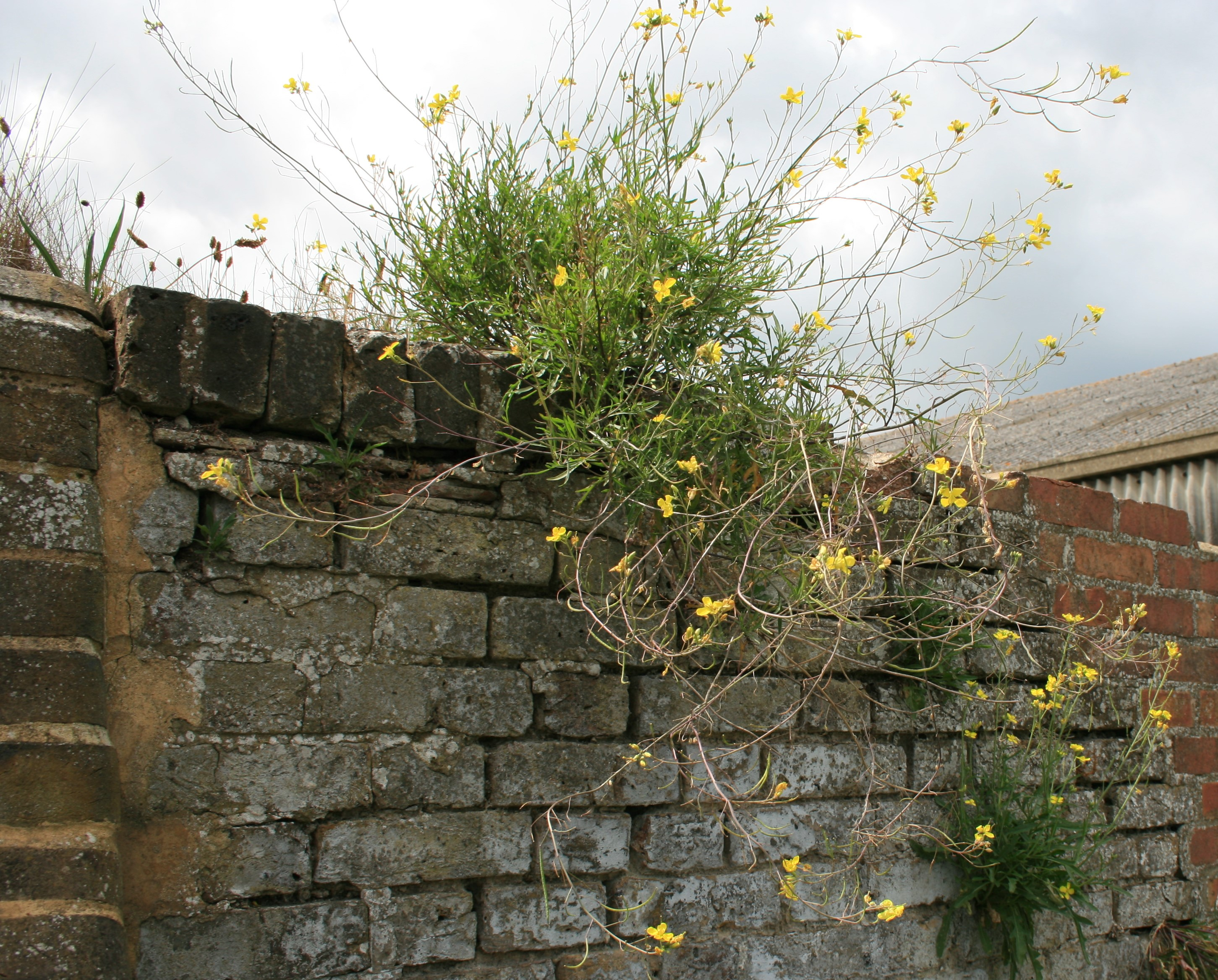
Old walls provide a suitable habitat

Within Europe, its native range covers much of France, the Low Countries, Italy, the Pannonian Basin and the western Balkans up to Macedonia, with generally more thinly scattered populations in northern Greece, Bulgaria, Romania, Crimea, Sicilly, Malta, Sardinia, Corsica and parts of Spain. It has extensively been introduced further north from its native range. In the British Isles the plant is an archaeophyte, with industrial regions and ports still at the centre of the distribution. It is established especially in parts of England and Wales (some believing the plant could even be native to the south-east). Its range has been expanding to the west since the 19th century, but it is still very rare in Scotland and Ireland. It has also been introduced into much of Central Europe: throughout Switzerland, Austria, Germany and Poland, with more scattered instances on the southern shores of Norway and Sweden (where it is found in fewer areas that in the recent past), the Baltic States, Belarus and a few locations further east in Ukraine and European Russia. It has also been introduced on Menorca and near Lisbon in Portugal.

== Ecology ==
It is a ruderal plant of roadsides and waste ground. It generally grows in places where there is full sunlight and requires moderately damp soils with a slightly alkaline reaction and moderately fertile conditions. It is tolerant of occasional salinity, which allows it to grow on the upper part of beaches and along salt-treated road verges. The Ellenberg values in Britain are L = 8, F = 5, R = 7, N = 6, and S = 1. In Spain, it can be found at elevations of up to 800 m.

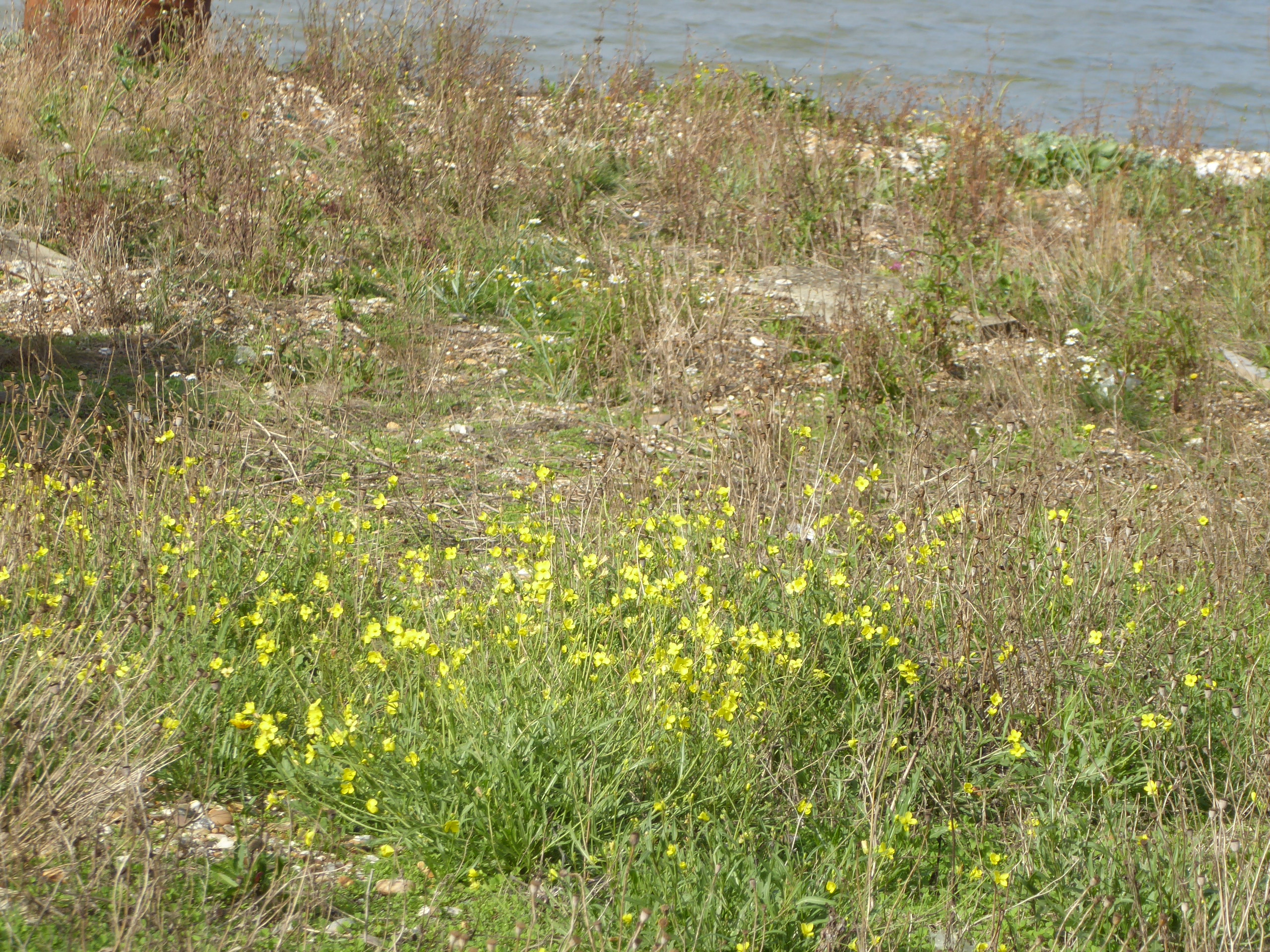
A likely native habitat is on shingle beaches

There are eleven species of insect that are known to feed on perennial wall-rocket in Britain. Five of these are weevils (Curculionidae):

- Ceutorhynchus contractus (Marsham), the cabbage leaf weevil - adults feed on leaves and stems
- C. picitarsis Gyllenhal - adults feed on leaves and stems
- C. timidus Weise (= C. chalibaeus Germar, 1824) - larvae make galls in the petioles.
- Otiorhynchus ligneus - adults feed on the roots
- O. ovatus - adults feed on the roots.

All five polyphagous and widespread.

Four of the phytophagous insects are Diptera (flies). The midge Contarinia nasturtii (Kieffer) has larvae that infest the stems, leaves and flowerheads, causing distortion and sterility. Dasineura brassicae (Winnertz) (previously D. napi (Loew)) is the brassica pod midge, an invasive non-native pest in Britain which causes damage to the developing seedpods. It is particularly of importance on rapeseed crops, but it can also infest wild plants of perennial wall-rocket. Gephyraulus raphanistri (Kieffer) is a gall midge that destroys the flowerheads. None of these species is restricted to wall-rocket and most are quite common, although the NBN Atlas has no records of brassica pod midge on wild plants in Britain as of 2022.

Finally, three species of Lepidoptera (butterflies and moths) are listed. Pieris brassicae is the common cabbage white butterfly, whose larvae eat the leaves and stems of this and many other species of Brassicaceae; Evergestis extimalis is a micromoth whose larvae feed in the flowerheads; and Sitochroa verticalis (the lesser pearl) is also a micromoth, the larvae of which are found on a wide variety of plants.

== Uses ==
Baby leaf rocket is cultivated worldwide as a salad leaf. In addition to D. tenuifolia, the annual Eruca sativa is grown and marketed under the same common names. These leaves are usually mixed with other baby leaf crops to form a mesclun-style salad. These crops have become popular due to their distinctive taste and texture in salads.

Wild rocket is high in ascorbic acid, carotenoids, polyphenols and glucosinolates, such as glucosativin and glucoerucin, which may contribute to the pungent flavour. When the leaves are chewed glucosinolates, through the enzyme myrosinase, are metabolized in isothiocyanates and indoles. Leaves preserved at 5 °C show a loss of ascorbic acid and glucosinolates, and an increase in polyphenols.

One of Trotula's works, Treatments for Women mentions "wild rocket cooked in wine" in a remedy for sanious flux in women.
