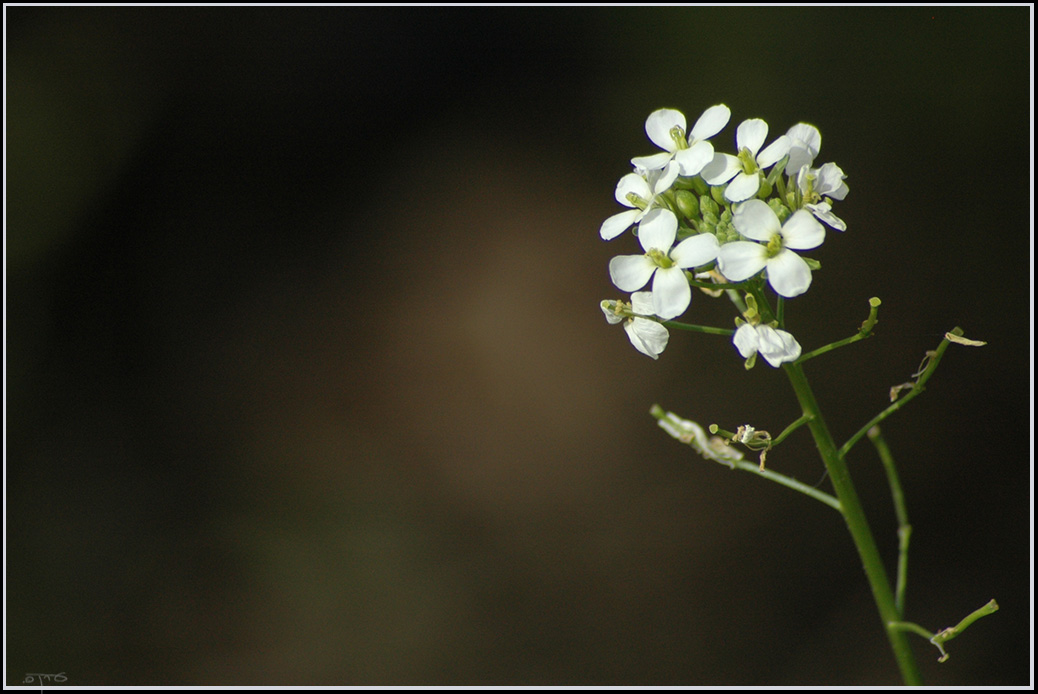
- Diplotaxis erucoides flowers and fruits

Scientific classification
- Kingdom: Plantae
- Clade: Tracheophytes
- Clade: Angiosperms
- Clade: Eudicots
- Clade: Rosids
- Order: Brassicales
- Family: Brassicaceae
- Genus: Diplotaxis
- Species: D. erucoides

Binomial name
- Diplotaxis erucoides (L.) DC.

= Diplotaxis erucoides =

Species of flowering plant

Diplotaxis erucoides, the white rocket or white wallrocket, is a species of annual herb of the family Brassicaceae native to West Mediterranean.

== Description ==
Diplotaxis erucoides is an herbaceous plant up to 20–60 centimetres (8–23 1/2 in) tall, with green, erect stem, sparsely pubescent, and pinnatisect leaves up to 15 cm long. It has racemes of white flowers with four 6–8 mm petals, four sepals, six stamens and a style with green stigma. The fruit is a 25–33 mm siliqua containing 40–80 seeds in two parallel series.
