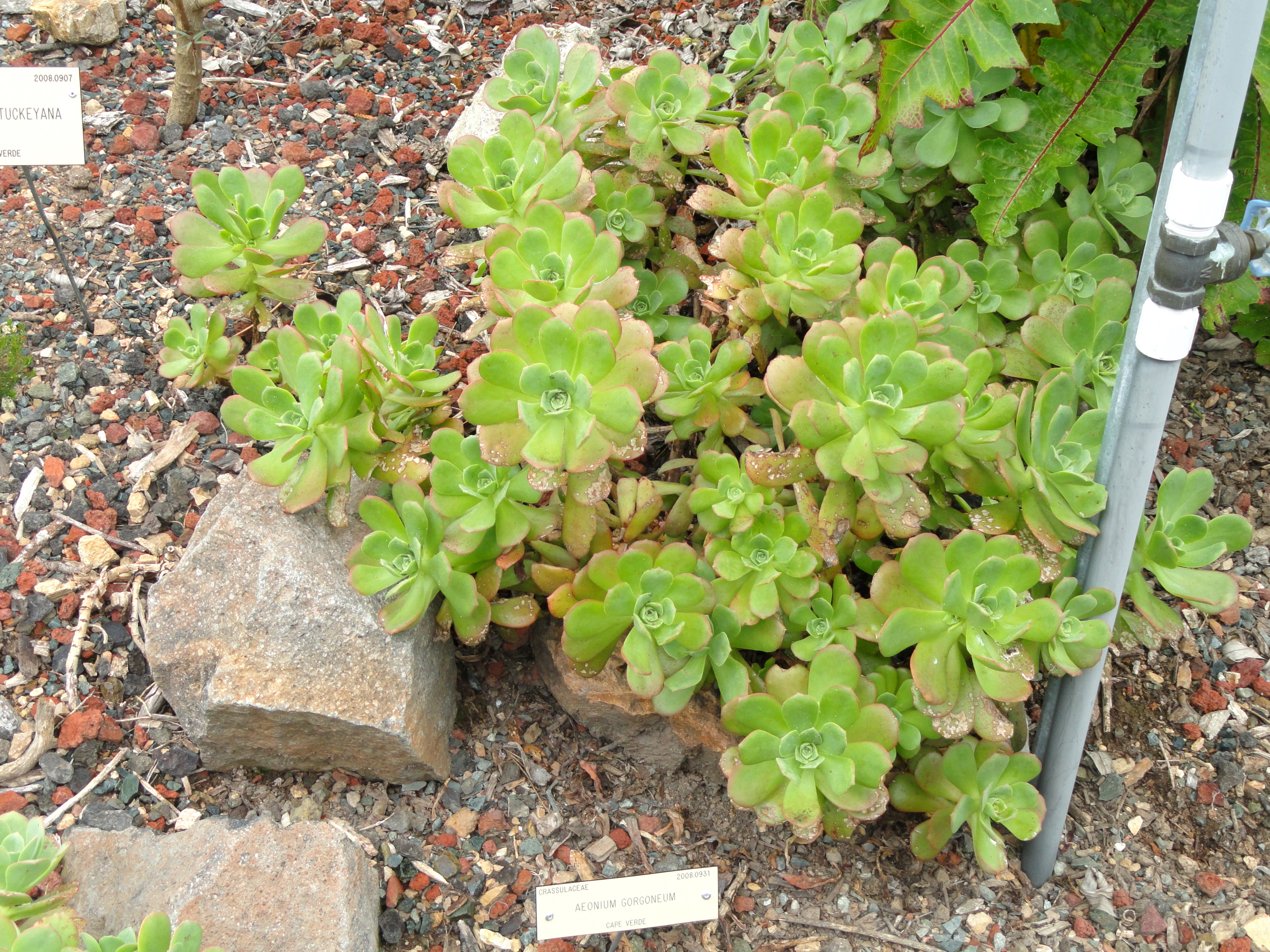
- Aeonium gorgoneum at the University of California Botanical Garden

Conservation status
- Endangered (IUCN 3.1)

Scientific classification
- Kingdom: Plantae
- Clade: Tracheophytes
- Clade: Angiosperms
- Clade: Eudicots
- Order: Saxifragales
- Family: Crassulaceae
- Genus: Aeonium
- Species: A. gorgoneum

Binomial name
- Aeonium gorgoneum J.A.Schmidt, 1852

Synonyms
- Aeonium webbii Bolle; Sempervivum gorgoneum J.A.Schmidt ex Cout.; Sempervivum webbii Schenck

= Aeonium gorgoneum =

Species of succulent

Aeonium gorgoneum is a species of flowering plant in the family Crassulaceae. The species is endemic to Cape Verde. It was first described by Johann Anton Schmidt in 1852. Its local name is saião. The plant plays a role in traditional medicine for the treatment of coughs.

== Description ==
The plant is a perennial shrub and grows up to about 2 m (6 ft 7 in) tall. Its chromosome number is 2n=36.

== Distribution and ecology ==
Aeonium gorgoneum is found on the islands of Santo Antão, São Vicente and São Nicolau at elevations from 400–1,100 m (1,300–3,600 ft) above sea level.

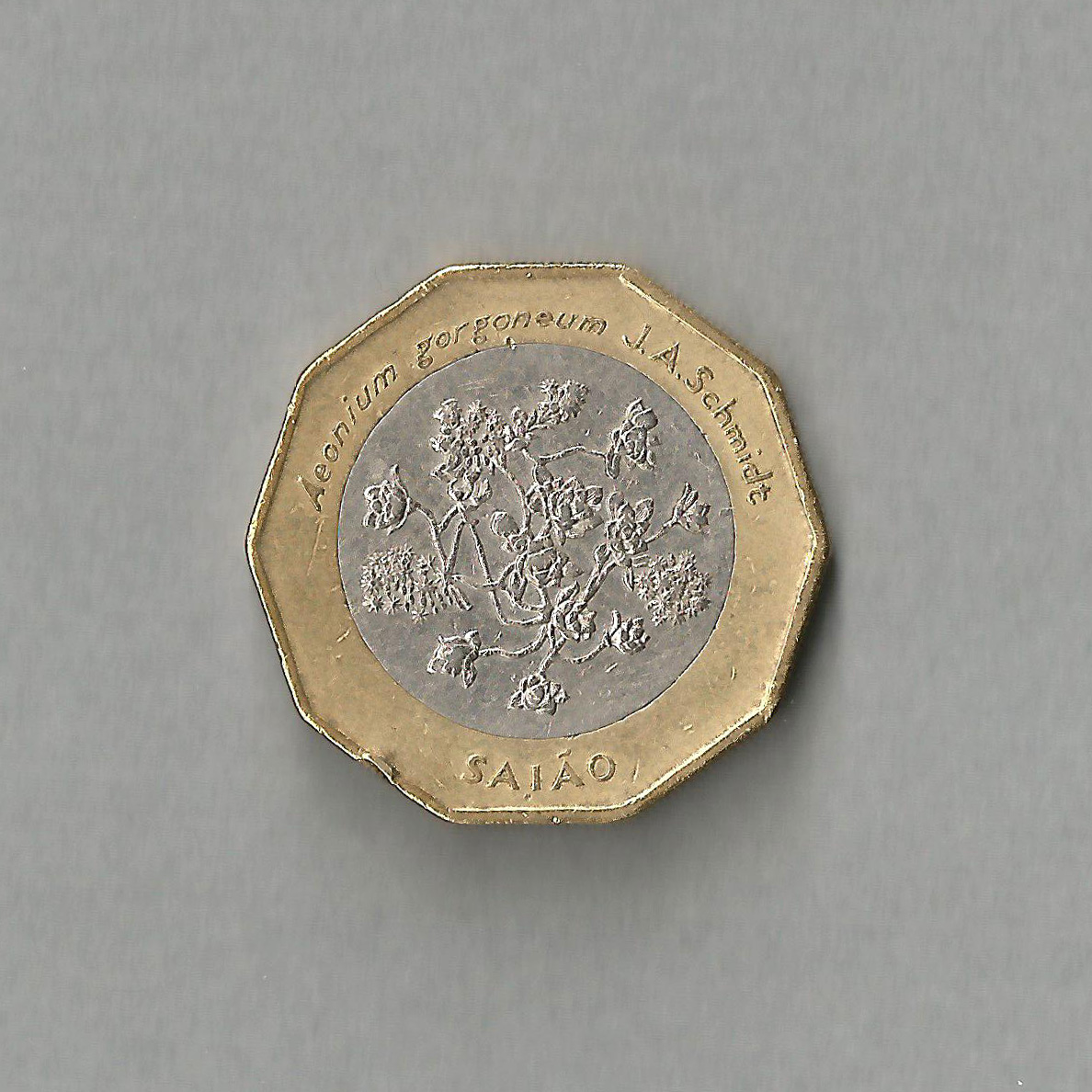
A $100 escudo coin featuring Aeonium gorgoneum
