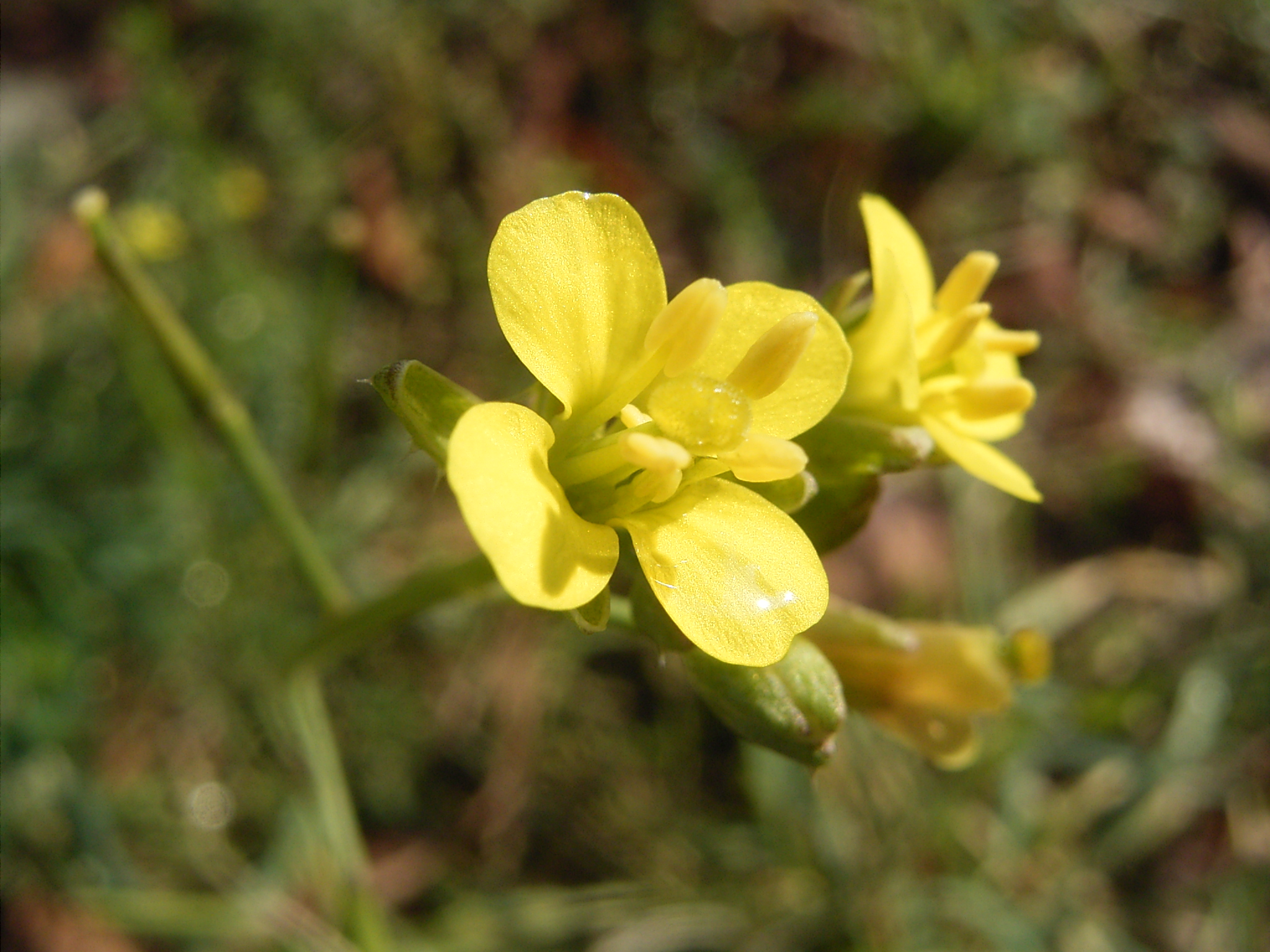

Scientific classification
- Kingdom: Plantae
- Clade: Tracheophytes
- Clade: Angiosperms
- Clade: Eudicots
- Clade: Rosids
- Order: Brassicales
- Family: Brassicaceae
- Genus: Diplotaxis
- Species: D. muralis

Binomial name
- Diplotaxis muralis (L.) DC.

Synonyms
- Sisymbrium murale

= Diplotaxis muralis =

Species of plant

Diplotaxis muralis, the annual wall-rocket, is a species of flowering plant in the family Brassicaceae. This plant is native to Europe, Asia, and Africa, but it is found throughout the temperate world, where it has naturalized. This is an erect mustard-like plant rarely reaching half a meter in height. It has lobed leaves and its stems are topped with dense inflorescences of yellow, or occasionally light purple, flowers with small oval petals and large anthers. The fruit is a podlike silique two to four centimeters long.

== Description ==
It is an annual, but sometimes grows as a perennial, growing up to 15–60 cm (5.9–23.6 in) tall on unbranched stems. It has lobed leaves, which form a rosette at the base of the plant. They are 2–9 cm (0.79–3.54 in) long and 1–3 cm (0.39–1.18 in) wide. It blooms in summer, between May and September in the UK, and between April and August in China. The flowers are yellow, with oblong sepals and longer, obovate petals. Later, it produces a fruit capsule, long cylindrical with a short beak. It contains 2 rows of yellow brown seeds, which are ovoid or ellipsoid shaped.

== Taxonomy ==
D. muralis was first published by Augustin Candolle in Syst. Nat. Vol.2 on page 634 in 1821, based on an earlier description by Carl Linnaeus. Linnaeus had named it 'Sisymbrium murale' in his seminal publication 'Species Plantarum' in 1753.

There are two known subspecies;

- Diplotaxis muralis subsp. ceratophylla (Batt.) Mart.-Laborde
- Diplotaxis muralis subsp. simplex (Viv.) Jafri

The Latin specific epithet muralis is interpreted as 'growing on walls'. D. muralis is commonly known as 'annual wall-rocket' or 'wall rocket', in the UK, as it can be found growing on old walls, and is similar in form to wall rocket (Diplotaxis tenuifolia ), which is taller and bushier.

Several cytological and morphological studies have suggested that D. muralis originated from natural hybridization between D. tenuifolia and D. viminea.

== Distribution and habitat ==
It is native to temperate regions of North Africa, Europe and parts of western Asia.

=== Range ===
It is found in North Africa, within Algeria, Libya, Morocco and Tunisia, in addition to Ethiopia in East Africa. Within Asia it is found in the Caucasus, Georgia (country) and Turkey. In middle Europe, it is in Austria, Belgium, Czech Republic, Germany, Hungary, the Netherlands, Poland, Slovakia and Switzerland. In southeastern Europe, within Albania, Bosnia and Herzegovina, Bulgaria, Croatia, Greece, Italy, Malta, Montenegro, North Macedonia, Romania, Serbia, Slovenia and Ukraine. Also in southwestern Europe, it is found in France, Portugal and Spain.

It has naturalised in the UK since 1778, when it was found in a field of oats raised from imported seeds from a ship wrecked on the Kent coast.

=== Habitat ===
It grows in waste and disturbed ground, such as beside railways, roads and on tips.

== Ecology ==
It is pollinated by bees and other flying insects. It is occasionally cultivated and ploughed into fields as a 'green manure'.
