= Cyperus sieberianus =

Scientific classification
- Kingdom: Plantae
- Clade: Tracheophytes
- Clade: Angiosperms
- Clade: Monocots
- Clade: Commelinids
- Order: Poales
- Family: Cyperaceae
- Genus: Cyperus
- Species: C. sieberianus

Binomial name
- Cyperus sieberianus Spreng., 1827

Species of sedge

Cyperus sieberianus is a species of sedge that is native to parts of the Cape Verde.

== See also ==
- List of Cyperus species
