= Limonium sundingii =

Conservation status
- Critically Endangered (IUCN 3.1)

Scientific classification
- Kingdom: Plantae
- Clade: Tracheophytes
- Clade: Angiosperms
- Clade: Eudicots
- Order: Caryophyllales
- Family: Plumbaginaceae
- Genus: Limonium
- Species: L. sundingii

Binomial name
- Limonium sundingii Leyens, Lobin, N.Kilian, Erben

Species of flowering plant

Limonium sundingii is a species of flowers that belong to the family Plumbaginaceae. The species is endemic to Cape Verde. It is listed as critically endangered by the IUCN.

== Distribution and ecology ==
Limonium sundingii is restricted to the island of São Nicolau, where it occurs in a small area in the east of the island, between 600 and 700 m elevation. They are found in humid and sub-humid zones.
