= Diplotaxis sundingii =

Conservation status
- Critically Endangered (IUCN 3.1)

Scientific classification
- Kingdom: Plantae
- Clade: Tracheophytes
- Clade: Angiosperms
- Clade: Eudicots
- Clade: Rosids
- Order: Brassicales
- Family: Brassicaceae
- Genus: Diplotaxis
- Species: D. sundingii

Binomial name
- Diplotaxis sundingii Rustan

Species of flowering plant

Diplotaxis sundingii is a species of flowering plants of the family Brassicaceae. The species is endemic to Cape Verde. It is listed as a critically endangered plant by the IUCN.

== Distribution and ecology ==
Diplotaxis sundingii is restricted to the island of São Nicolau, where it occurs in mountainous zones in the east of the island, between 500 and 700 metres elevation. Its population size is estimated at less than 250 individuals.
