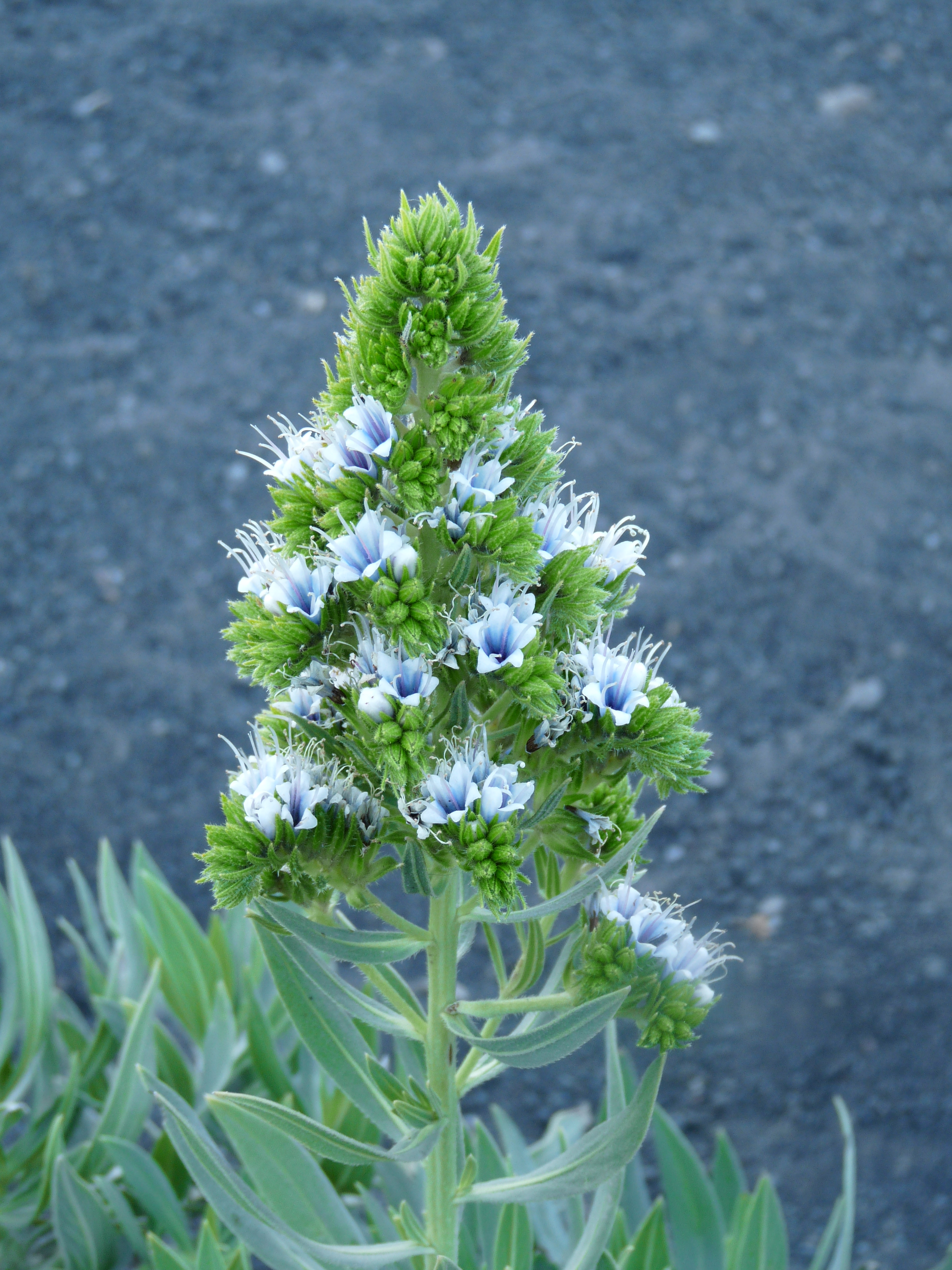
- Echium vulcanorum on Chã das Caldeiras

Conservation status
- Endangered (IUCN 3.1)

Scientific classification
- Kingdom: Plantae
- Clade: Tracheophytes
- Clade: Angiosperms
- Clade: Eudicots
- Clade: Asterids
- Order: Boraginales
- Family: Boraginaceae
- Genus: Echium
- Species: E. vulcanorum

Binomial name
- Echium vulcanorum A.Chev., 1935

= Echium vulcanorum =

Species of flowering plant

Echium vulcanorum is a species of flowering plants of the family Boraginaceae. The species is endemic to Cape Verde. It is listed as an endangered plant by the IUCN. The species was first described in 1935 by Auguste Chevalier. Its local name is língua-de-vaca (cow tongue), a name that may also refer to the related species Echium hypertropicum and Echium stenosiphon. The oil of its seeds contains γ-linolenic acid, and is used for medicinal and dietary purposes.

== Description ==
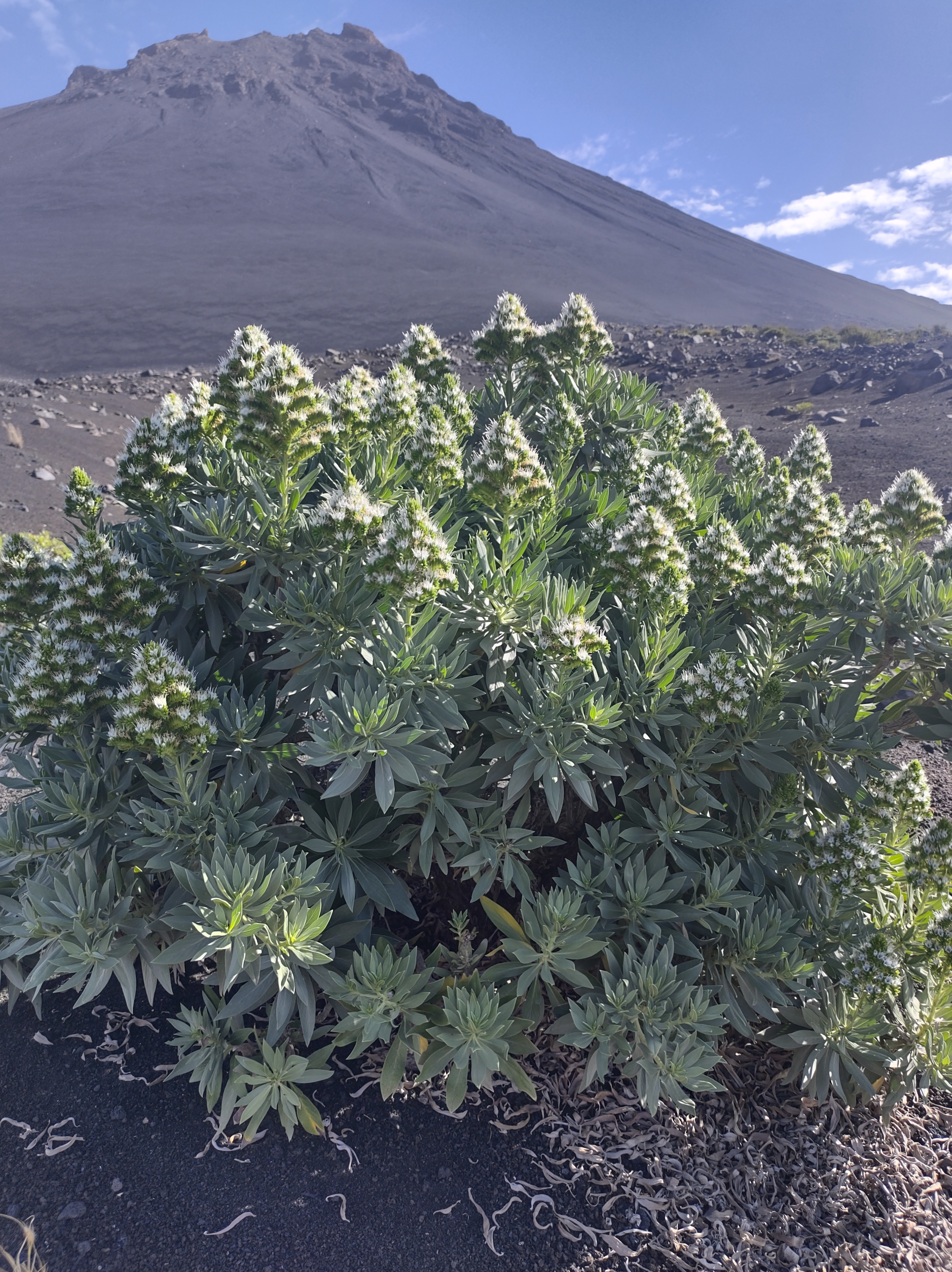
Echium Vulcanorum near Pico do Fogo.

The plant is a very branched shrub that reaches 1–2 m height. Its leaves are lanceolate and 5-7 cm long and 1-1.5 cm wide. Its flowers are white, rarely bluish. Although the plant can have flowers all year long, the most display occurs in the spring when the plant is covered in enormous, cone-shaped clusters of blossoms. Each funnel-shaped blossom has blue streaks radiating from its center and is pearly white with a length of little under an inch. Bees are very fond of the blossoms. Echium vulcanorum is a long-lived species that flower beautifully for several years, in contrast to many Echium species that only flower once before dying.

== Distribution and ecology ==
Echium vulcanorum is restricted to the island of Fogo, where it occurs between 1,600 and 2,400 m elevation, in semi-arid zones.
