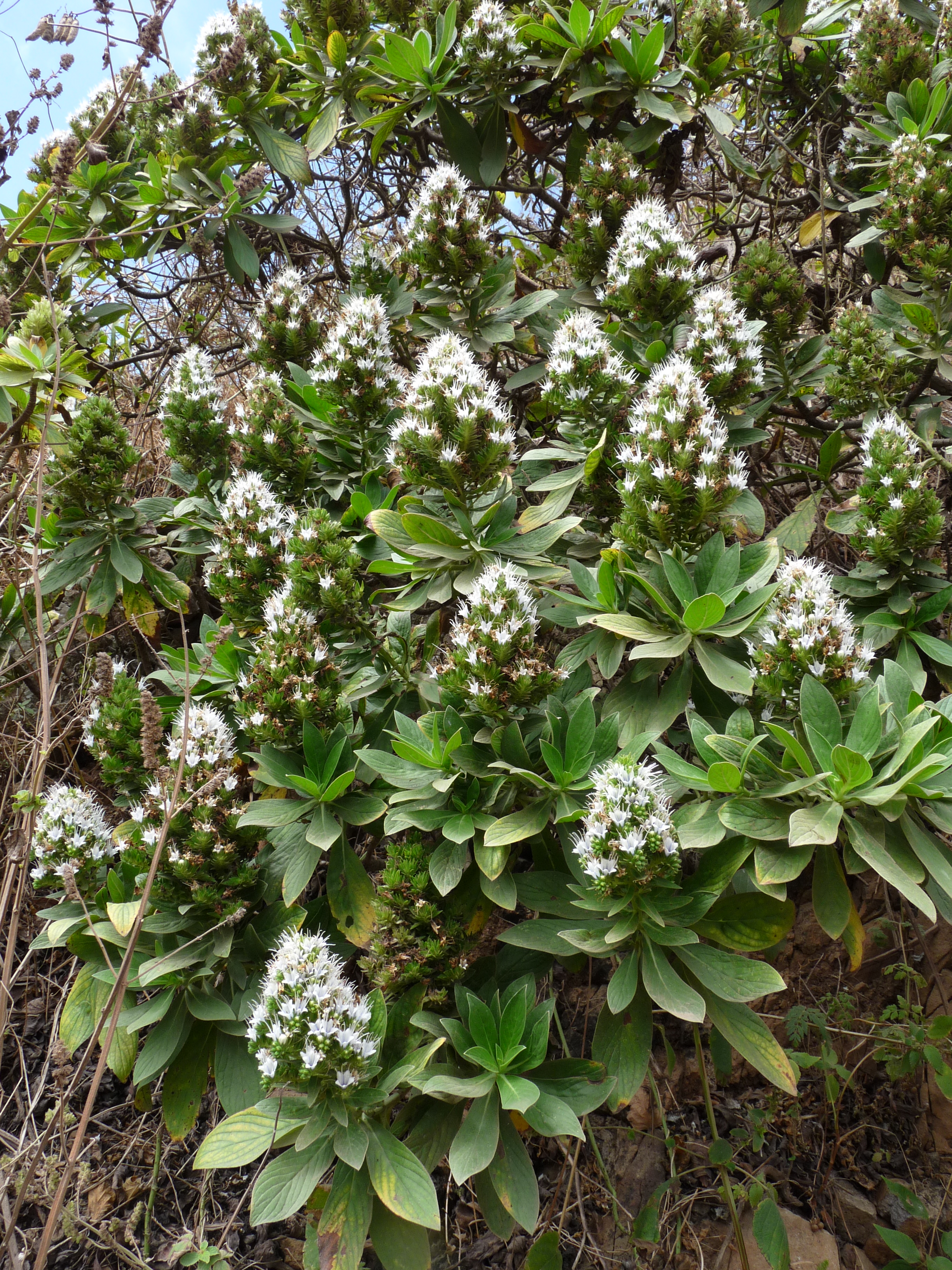
- Echium hypertropicum at Ribeira Principal in Santiago Island

Conservation status
- Endangered (IUCN 3.1)

Scientific classification
- Kingdom: Plantae
- Clade: Tracheophytes
- Clade: Angiosperms
- Clade: Eudicots
- Clade: Asterids
- Order: Boraginales
- Family: Boraginaceae
- Genus: Echium
- Species: E. hypertropicum

Binomial name
- Echium hypertropicum Webb, 1849

= Echium hypertropicum =

Species of flowering plant

Echium hypertropicum is a species of flowering plants of the family Boraginaceae. The species is endemic to Cape Verde. It is listed as an endangered plant by the IUCN.

Its local name is língua-de-vaca (cow tongue), a name that may also refer to the related species Echium vulcanorum and Echium stenosiphon. The oil of its seeds contains γ-linolenic acid, and is used for medicinal and dietary purposes.

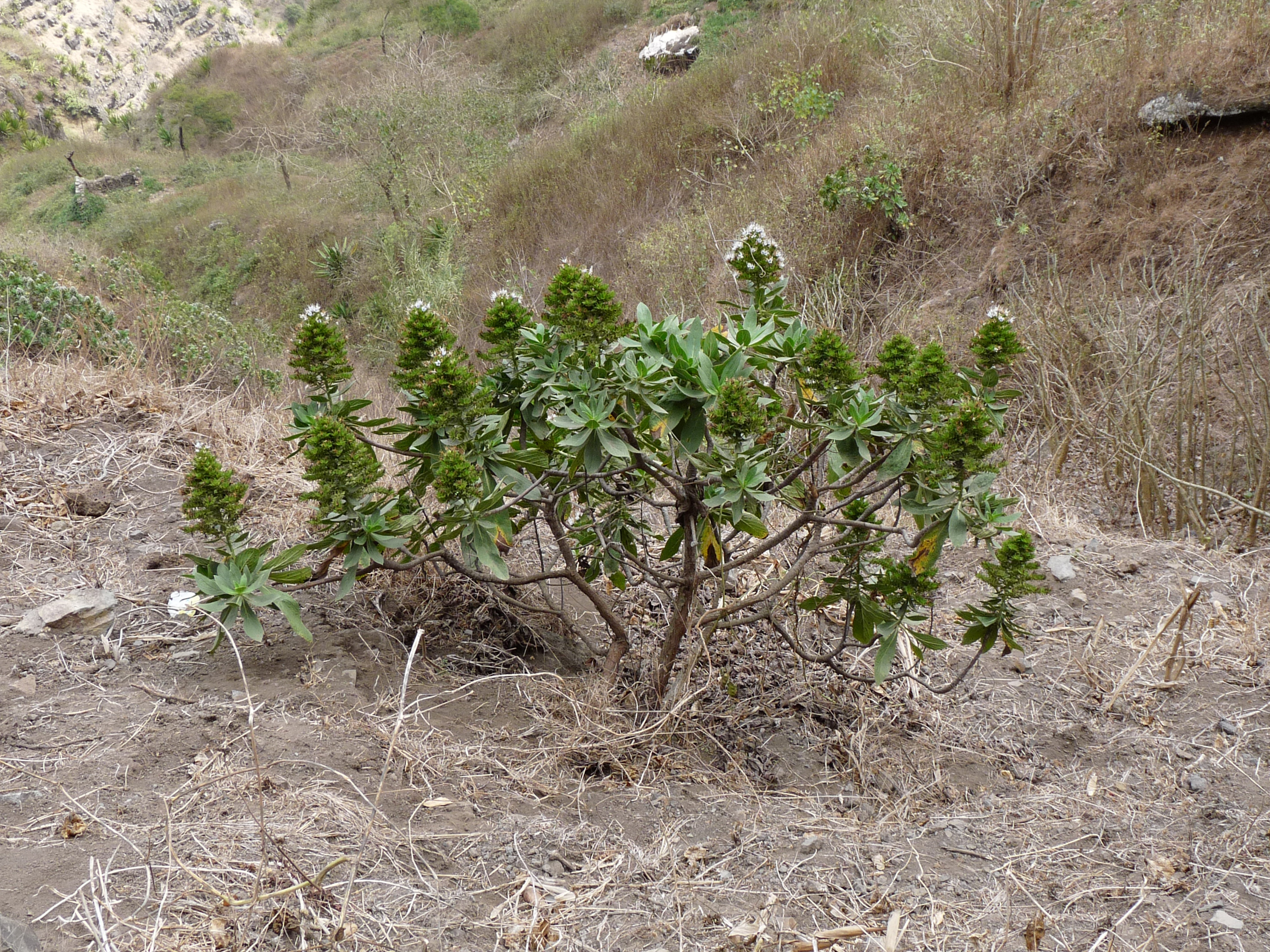
Echium hypertropicum near Ribeira Principal in Santiago

== Description ==
The plant can reach 2 m height. Its leaves are lance-shaped and can be up to 20 cm long. Its flowers are whitish, purplish or bluish. Old plants higher than 0.5–1 m are extremely rare today.

== Distribution and ecology ==
Echium hypertropicum occurs on the islands of Santiago and Brava. It mainly occurs in sub-humid and humid zones.
