= Diplotaxis hirta =

Conservation status
- Endangered (IUCN 3.1)

Scientific classification
- Kingdom: Plantae
- Clade: Tracheophytes
- Clade: Angiosperms
- Clade: Eudicots
- Clade: Rosids
- Order: Brassicales
- Family: Brassicaceae
- Genus: Diplotaxis
- Species: D. hirta

Binomial name
- Diplotaxis hirta (A.Chev) Rustan, L.Borgen

Synonyms
- Diplotaxis decumbens (Chev.) Rustan & L.Borgen; Sinapidendron hirtum A.Chev.

Species of flowering plant

Diplotaxis hirta is a species of flowering plants of the family Brassicaceae. The species is endemic to Cape Verde. It is listed as an endangered plant by the IUCN.

== Distribution and ecology ==
Diplotaxis hirta is restricted to mountain areas of the island of Fogo, between 800 and 2,000 metres elevation.
