= Diplotaxis gorgadensis =

Conservation status
- Endangered (IUCN 3.1)

Scientific classification
- Kingdom: Plantae
- Clade: Tracheophytes
- Clade: Angiosperms
- Clade: Eudicots
- Clade: Rosids
- Order: Brassicales
- Family: Brassicaceae
- Genus: Diplotaxis
- Species: D. gorgadensis

Binomial name
- Diplotaxis gorgadensis Rustan

Species of flowering plant

Diplotaxis gorgadensis is a species of flowering plants of the family Brassicaceae. The species is endemic to Cape Verde. It is listed as an endangered plant by the IUCN.

== Distribution and ecology ==
Diplotaxis gorgadensis is restricted to the island of Santo Antão, where it occurs in the northeastern part of the island, between 450 and 1,300 metres elevation. It is more frequent in humid mountain zones, but is also found in sub-humid and semi-arid zones.

== Subspecies ==
Two subspecies are recognised:

- Diplotaxis gorgadensis subsp. brochmannii
- Diplotaxis gorgadensis subsp. gorgadensis
