= Diplotaxis varia =

Conservation status
- Endangered (IUCN 3.1)

Scientific classification
- Kingdom: Plantae
- Clade: Tracheophytes
- Clade: Angiosperms
- Clade: Eudicots
- Clade: Rosids
- Order: Brassicales
- Family: Brassicaceae
- Genus: Diplotaxis
- Species: D. varia

Binomial name
- Diplotaxis varia Rustan

Species of flowering plant

Diplotaxis varia is a species of flowering plants of the family Brassicaceae. The species is endemic to Cape Verde. It is listed as an endangered plant by the IUCN.

== Distribution and ecology ==
Diplotaxis varia is restricted to the islands of Santiago and Brava, where it occurs between 150 and 920 metres elevation.
