= Diplotaxis antoniensis =

Conservation status
- Vulnerable (IUCN 3.1)

Scientific classification
- Kingdom: Plantae
- Clade: Tracheophytes
- Clade: Angiosperms
- Clade: Eudicots
- Clade: Rosids
- Order: Brassicales
- Family: Brassicaceae
- Genus: Diplotaxis
- Species: D. antoniensis

Binomial name
- Diplotaxis antoniensis Rustan

Species of flowering plant

Diplotaxis antoniensis is a species of flowering plants of the family Brassicaceae. The species is endemic to Cape Verde. It is listed as a vulnerable plant by the IUCN.

== Distribution and ecology ==
Diplotaxis antoniensis is restricted to the island of Santo Antão. It occurs between 1,100 and 1,500 metres elevation in arid, semi-arid and sub-humid zones. It is found on mountain slopes, in stony plains and in cultivated fields, where it is considered as a weed.
