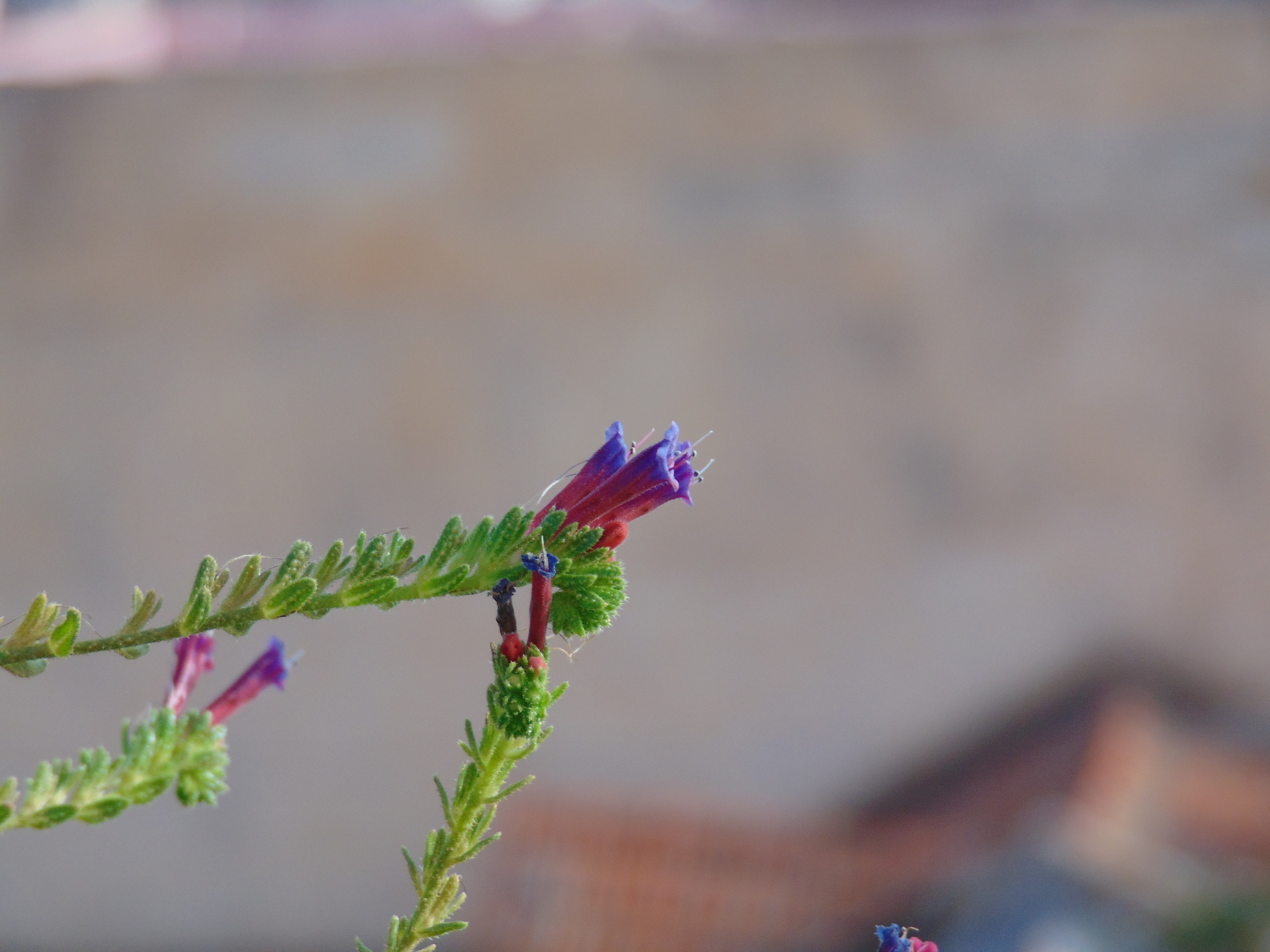

Scientific classification
- Kingdom: Plantae
- Clade: Tracheophytes
- Clade: Angiosperms
- Clade: Eudicots
- Clade: Asterids
- Order: Boraginales
- Family: Boraginaceae
- Genus: Echium
- Species: E. stenosiphon

Binomial name
- Echium stenosiphon Webb, 1849

= Echium stenosiphon =

Species of flowering plant

Echium stenosiphon is a plant species of the family Boraginaceae. The species is endemic to Cape Verde. Its local name is língua-de-vaca (cow tongue), a name that may also refer to the related species Echium vulcanorum and Echium hypertropicum. The plant is used in traditional medicinal for a cough syrup.

== Distribution and ecology ==
Echium stenosiphon occurs in the Barlavento islands of Santo Antão, São Nicolau, São Vicente and Santa Luzia. It mainly occurs in the subhumid and humid zones, but has also been reported from the arid zone on São Vicente.

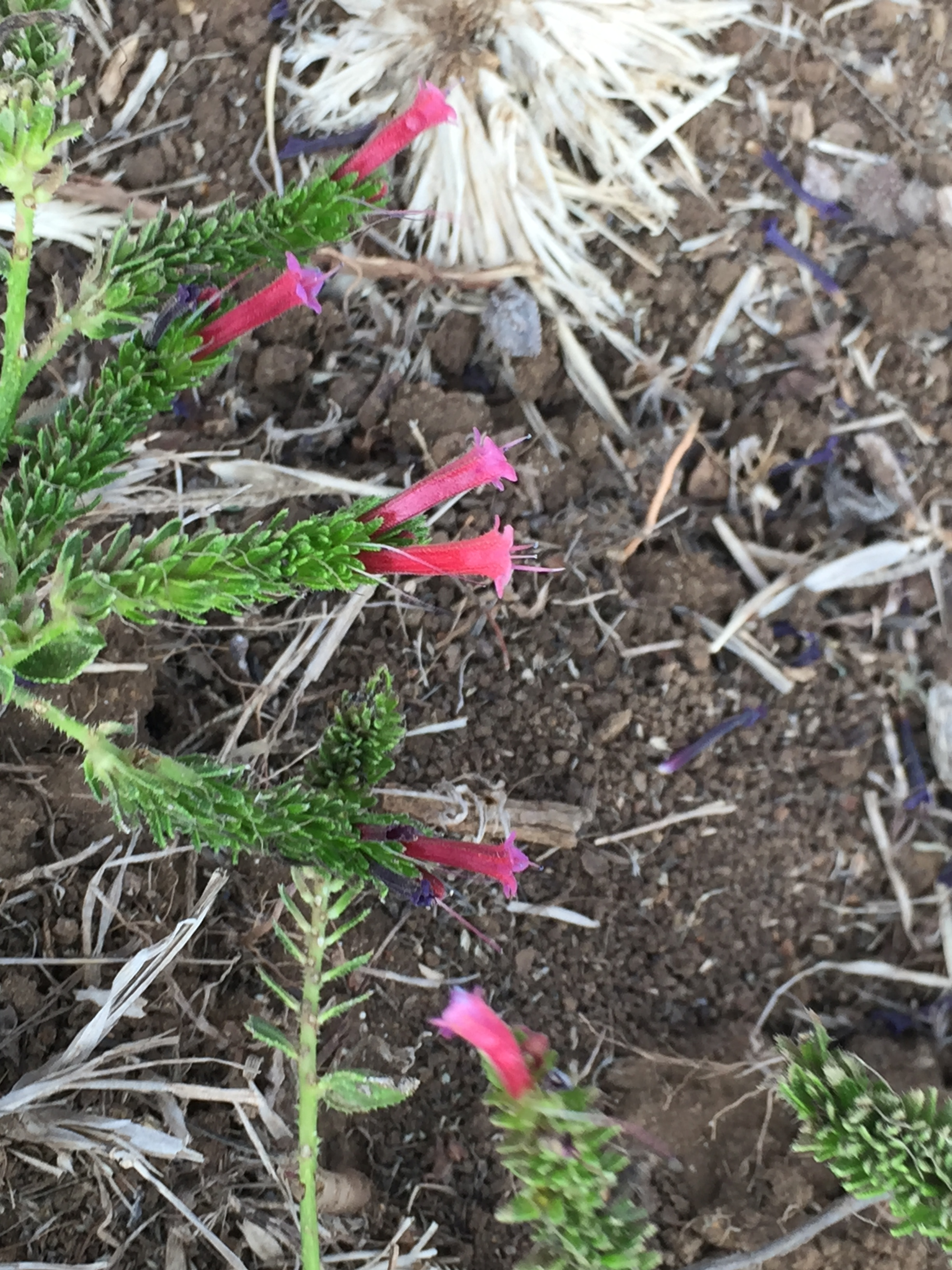
Flowers of E. stenosiphon at Monte Verde.

== Subspecies ==
The following subspecies are recognised:

- Echium stenosiphon subsp. glabrescens
- Echium stenosiphon subsp. lindbergii
- Echium stenosiphon subsp. stenosiphon
