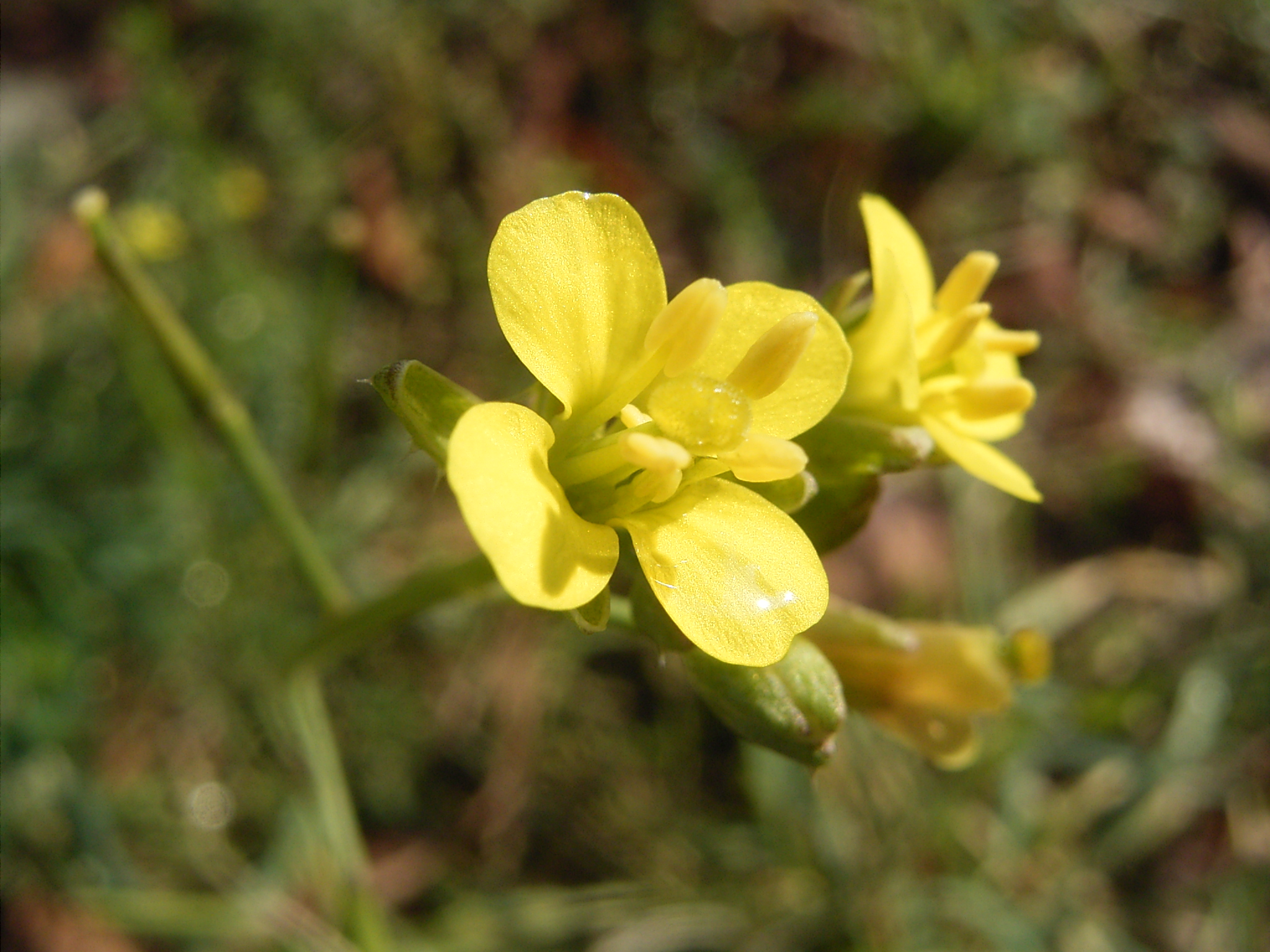
- Diplotaxis muralis

Scientific classification
- Kingdom: Plantae
- Clade: Tracheophytes
- Clade: Angiosperms
- Clade: Eudicots
- Clade: Rosids
- Order: Brassicales
- Family: Brassicaceae
- Genus: Diplotaxis; DC.

Synonyms
- Pendulina Willk.

= Diplotaxis (plant) =

Genus of flowering plants

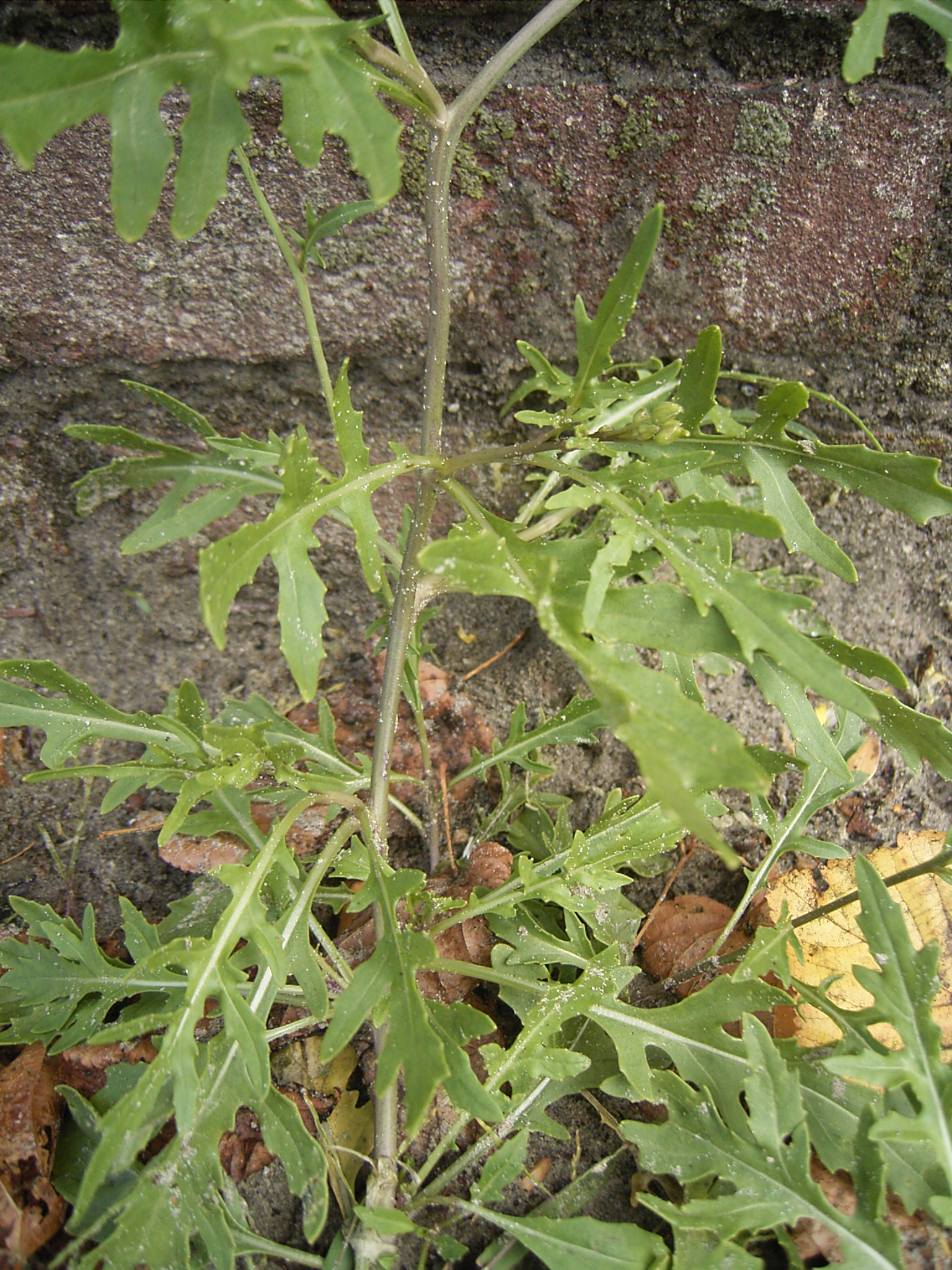
Foliage of Diplotaxis tenuifolia

Diplotaxis (wall-rocket) is a genus of 39 species of flowering plants in the family Brassicaceae (Cruciferae), native to Europe, the Mediterranean region, Macaronesia, Western Asia, the Himalayas, and northeastern tropical Africa; the species diversity is highest in the Iberian Peninsula, North Africa and the Cape Verde archipelago. They are annual or perennial plants, either herbaceous or sub-shrubby with a woody base. The flowers are yellow in most species, but are white in Diplotaxis erucoides and violet in Diplotaxis acris. Some species, such as Diplotaxis tenuifolia and Diplotaxis muralis, have been historically used as leaf vegetables, are similar to Eruca sativa in their peppery flavour, and are used interchangeably with it.

== Species ==
39 species are accepted.

- Diplotaxis acris (Forssk.) Boiss.
- Diplotaxis antoniensis Rustan
- Diplotaxis assurgens (Delile) Thell.
- Diplotaxis australis Mart.-Laborde
- Diplotaxis berthautii Braun-Blanq. & Maire
- Diplotaxis brachycarpa Godron
- Diplotaxis brevisiliqua (Coss.) Mart.-Laborde
- Diplotaxis brochmannii (Rustan) Rivas Mart., Lousã, J.C.Costa & Maria C.Duarte
- Diplotaxis catholica (L.) DC.
- Diplotaxis cossoniana (Reut. ex Boiss.) O.E.Schulz
- Diplotaxis cretacea Kolov
- Diplotaxis cyrenaica (E.A.Durand & Barratte) Maire & Weiller
- Diplotaxis duveyrieriana Coss.
- Diplotaxis erucoides (L.) DC. – white wall-rocket
- Diplotaxis glauca (J.A.Schmidt) O.E.Schulz
- Diplotaxis gorgadensis Rustan
- Diplotaxis gracilis (Webb) O.E.Schulz
- Diplotaxis griffithii (Hook.f. & Thomson) Boiss.
- Diplotaxis harra (Forssk.) Boiss.
- Diplotaxis hirta (A.Chev.) Rustan & L.Borgen
- Diplotaxis ibicensis (Pau) Gómez-Campo
- Diplotaxis ilorcitana (Sennen) Aedo, Mart.-Laborde & Muñoz Garm.
- Diplotaxis kohlaanensis A. G. Miller & J. Nyberg
- Diplotaxis muralis (L.) DC. – annual wall-rocket
- Diplotaxis nepalensis Hara
- Diplotaxis ollivieri Maire
- Diplotaxis pitardiana Maire
- Diplotaxis saharensis (Coss.) Mart.-Laborde
- Diplotaxis × schweinfurthii O.E.Schulz
- Diplotaxis siettiana Maire
- Diplotaxis siifolia Kunze
- Diplotaxis simplex (Viv.) Spreng.
- Diplotaxis sundingii Rustan
- Diplotaxis tenuifolia (L.) DC. – perennial wall-rocket
- Diplotaxis tenuisiliqua Delile
- Diplotaxis varia Rustan
- Diplotaxis villosa Boulos & Jallad
- Diplotaxis viminea (L.) DC.
- Diplotaxis virgata (Cav.) DC.
- Diplotaxis vogelii (Webb) Cout.
- Diplotaxis × wirtgenii Rouy & Foucaud
