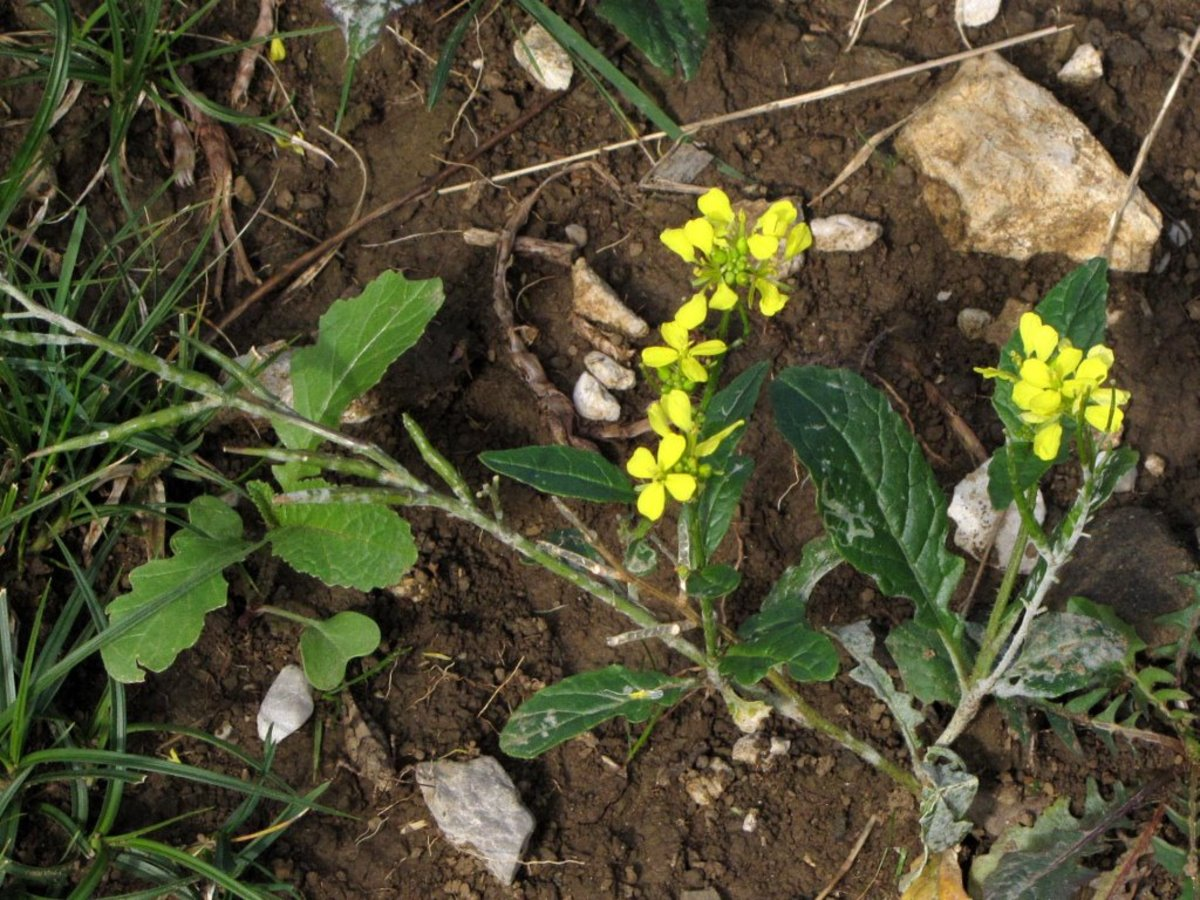

Scientific classification
- Kingdom: Plantae
- Clade: Tracheophytes
- Clade: Angiosperms
- Clade: Eudicots
- Clade: Rosids
- Order: Brassicales
- Family: Brassicaceae
- Genus: Diplotaxis
- Species: D. viminea

Binomial name
- Diplotaxis viminea (L.) DC.

Synonyms
- Diplotaxis prolongoi

= Diplotaxis viminea =

Species of plant

Diplotaxis viminea also known by the common name Vineyard wall rocket is a species of annual herb in the family Brassicaceae. They have a self-supporting growth form and simple, broad leaves. Individuals can grow to 5.8 cm tall. It forms a basal rosette of leaves and flowering stems with or without leaves. It blooms June through October in western Europe, but may have an extended flowering period of up to eight months elsewhere in its range. This species grows in fields and vineyards and is considered by some to be a weed of vegetable crops, vineyards, and gardens.

== Sources ==
This article incorporates text from a free content work. Licensed under CC0 (license statement/permission). Text taken from Diplotaxis viminea. Encyclopedia of Life.
