= Johann Anton Schmidt =

German botanist

- Born: 5 April 1823; Hamburg, Germany
- Died: 21 January 1905 (aged 81); Elberfeld, Germany
- Occupation: botanist

Johann Anton Schmidt (6 May 1823 – 21 January 1905) was a German botanist. The standard author abbreviation J.A.Schmidt is used to indicate this person as the author when citing a botanical name.

Schmidt was born in Hamburg to a merchant family. Under the request of their family, he became a gardener and studied botany in 1843 at the University of Heidelberg (with Gottlieb Wilhelm Bischoff) and in 1849 at the University of Göttingen (with August Grisebach and Friedrich Gottlieb Bartling), in 1850, he was promoted with a dissertation of the causes of the plant to spread, in 1851, he went to a collecting trip in the Cape Verdean Islands and studied its habilitation in Heidelberg on the local flora of Cape Verde.

In 1852, he became private lecturer of Heidelberg and studied the local flora. He also provided for example, mint and figworts for Flora Brasiliensis by Carl Friedrich Philipp von Martius. In 1852 he became a member of the Leopoldine order. After the death of Gottlieb Wilhelm Bischoff, he temporarily headed the botanical garden. He hoped to have a full appointment succeeding Bischoff as director of the botanical gardens, instead, Wilhelm Hofmeister became in 1863. He was announced back to Hamburg as a tutor. He suffered a stroke in 1902 and after the death of his wife in 1904, he moved to Elberfeld, he died in 1905.

Its herbarium is in Hamburg (hermabrium Hamburg, HBG) and the library is in Kiel.

The genus of grasses named Schmidtia is named after him.

== Works ==
- Beiträge zur Flora der Kapverdischen Inseln, Heidelberg 1852
- Flora von Heidelberg, Heidelberg 1857
