= Diplotaxis gracilis =

Conservation status
- Endangered (IUCN 3.1)

Scientific classification
- Kingdom: Plantae
- Clade: Tracheophytes
- Clade: Angiosperms
- Clade: Eudicots
- Clade: Rosids
- Order: Brassicales
- Family: Brassicaceae
- Genus: Diplotaxis
- Species: D. gracilis

Binomial name
- Diplotaxis gracilis (Webb) O.E.Schulz, 1916

Synonyms
- Sinapidendron gracile Webb, 1822

Species of flowering plant

Diplotaxis gracilis is a species of wall rockets that belong to the family Brassicaceae. The species is endemic to Cape Verde and is listed as endangered by the IUCN. The plant was named by Otto Eugen Schulz in 1916. The local name of the plant is mostarda-brabo (wild mustard).

== Distribution and ecology ==
Diplotaxis gracilis is found only in the island of São Nicolau, between 600 and 1,200 meters elevation. It occurs on steep slopes in the Monte Gordo Natural Park.
