= Monte Velha =

Mountain in Cape Verde

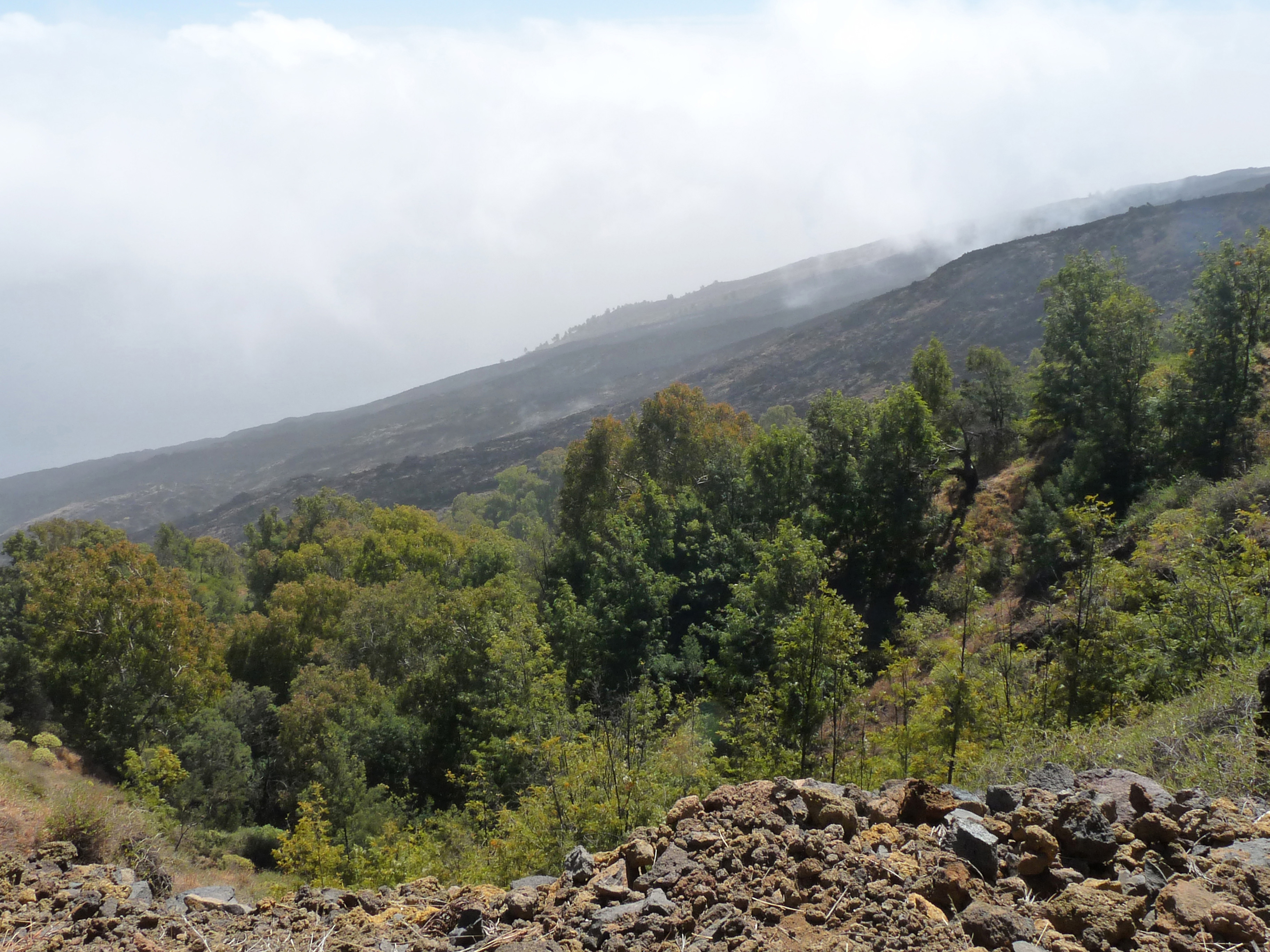
- View of Chã das Caldeiras from the slopes of Monte Velha

Highest point
- Elevation: 1,482 m (4,862 ft)
- Listing: List of mountains in Cape Verde
- Coordinates: 15°0′08″N 24°20′42″W

Geography
- Location within Cape Verde
- Location: northeastern Fogo

Monte Velha is a peak in the northeastern part of the island of Fogo in Cape Verde. Its elevation is 1,482 m. It is a subpeak of the Pico do Fogo volcano, located at the northeastern end of the crater rim. It lies within the municipality of Mosteiros, 4 km southwest of the city centre. Its forest is a protected area, part of the larger Fogo Natural Park.

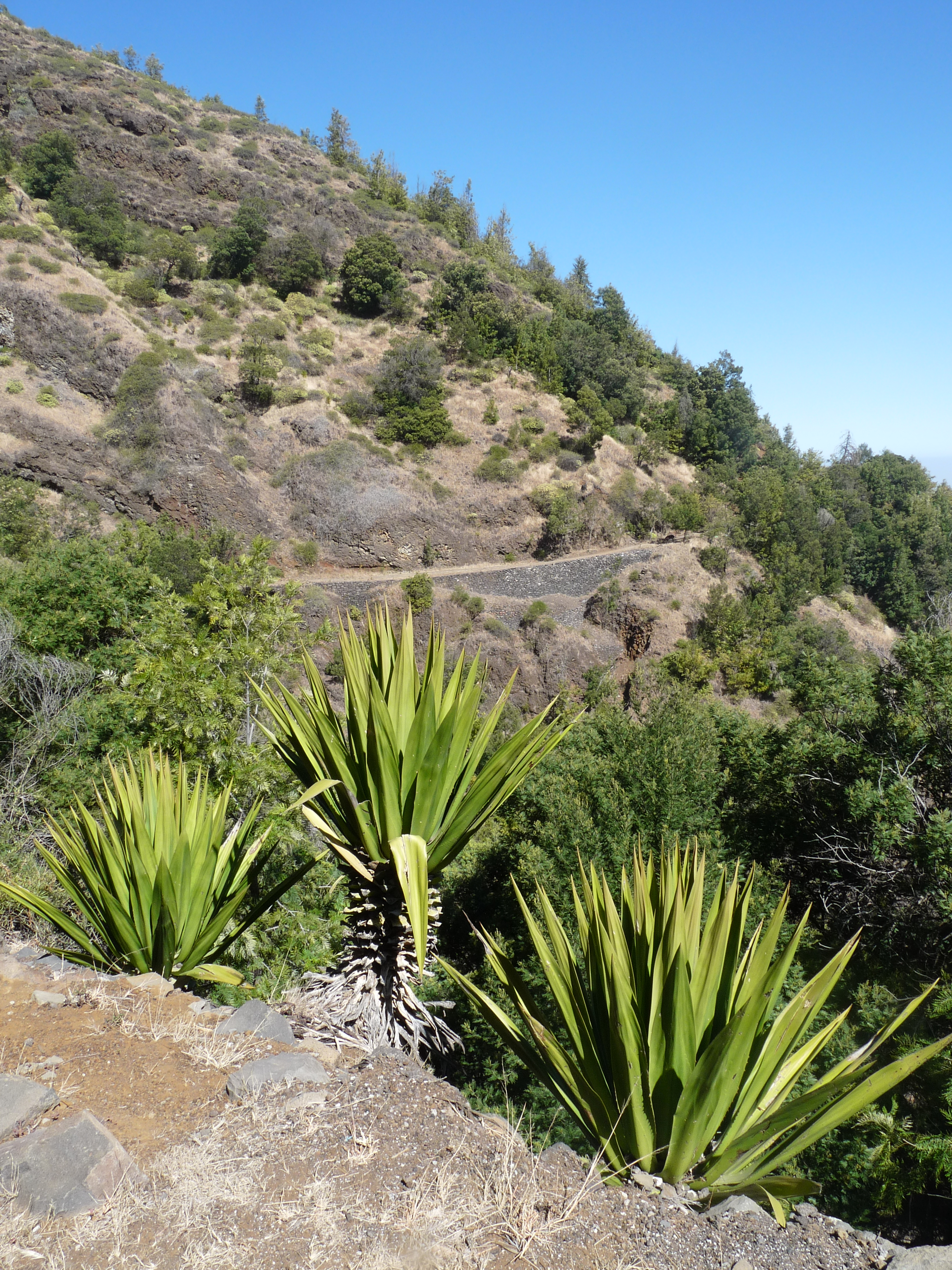
Agaves on the slope of Monte Velha

Due to the exposure of northeast winds, Monte Velha is the most humid part of the island. The annual precipitation shows much variation: in the period 1990-2000 it ranged between 214 and 1,481 mm.

== See also ==
- List of mountains in Cape Verde
