= Periplocin =

Names
- IUPAC name 3-[(3S,5S,8R,9S,10R,13R,14S,17R)-5,14-dihydroxy-3-[(2R,4S,5R,6R)-4-methoxy-6-methyl-5-[(2S,3R,4S,5S,6R)-3,4,5-trihydroxy-6-(hydroxymethyl)oxan-2-yl]oxyoxan-2-yl]oxy-10,13-dimethyl-2,3,4,6,7,8,9,11,12,15,16,17-dodecahydro-1H-cyclopenta[a]phenanthren-17-yl]-2H-furan-5-one

Identifiers
CAS Number	13137-64-9
3D model (JSmol)	Interactive image
ChemSpider	16739442
ECHA InfoCard	100.208.699
EC Number	683-188-2
PubChem CID	14463159
UNII	199X940O3K
CompTox Dashboard (EPA)	DTXSID501030586
- InChI: InChI=1S/C36H56O13/c1-18-31(49-32-30(41)29(40)28(39)25(16-37)48-32)24(44-4)14-27(46-18)47-20-5-9-33(2)22-6-10-34(3)21(19-13-26(38)45-17-19)8-12-36(34,43)23(22)7-11-35(33,42)15-20/h13,18,20-25,27-32,37,39-43H,5-12,14-17H2,1-4H3/t18-,20+,21-,22+,23-,24+,25-,27+,28-,29+,30-,31-,32+,33-,34-,35+,36+/m1/s1 Key: KWBPKUMWVXUSCA-AXQDKOMKSA-N
- SMILES: C[C@@H]1[C@H]([C@H](C[C@@H](O1)O[C@H]2CC[C@@]3([C@H]4CC[C@@]5([C@H](CC[C@@]5([C@@H]4CC[C@@]3(C2)O)O)C6=CC(=O)OC6)C)C)OC)O[C@H]7[C@@H]([C@H]([C@@H]([C@H](O7)CO)O)O)O

Properties
Chemical formula	C_{36}H_{56}O_{13}
Molar mass	696.831 g·mol^{−1}

Hazards
- GHS labelling
Pictograms	(GHS06: Toxic) (GHS08: Health hazard)
Signal word	Danger
Hazard statements	H300, H330, H373
Precautionary statements	P260, P264, P270, P271, P284, P301+P316, P304+P340, P316, P319, P320, P321, P330, P403+P233, P405, P501
- Except where otherwise noted, data are given for materials in their standard state (at 25 °C [77 °F], 100 kPa). Infobox references

Periplocin is a plant-derived glycoside whereby the sugar moiety is linked to a steroid. First reported in 1897 from the stem bark of Periploca graeca from the southwest Caucasus in the Black Sea region. It can also be extracted from Periploca calophylla, Periploca forrestii, Periploca omeiensis and the traditional Chinese medicine cortex periplocae (CPP), the dry root bark of Periploca sepium.

High doses of periplocin are toxic as a cardiac glycoside.

CPP's healing activities have long been recognized in traditional Chinese medicine where it has been used to treat rheumatoid arthritis. Scientific studies of CPP have identified over 100 components of which periplocin has been a major focus both for its toxicity as well as for its potential beneficial pharmaceutical effects. Besides the cardiac glycosides with periplocin as its main constituent, the CPP contains different C21-steroidal glycosides such as periplocodides and pregnene derivatives, fatty acids, volatile oils, terpenes, and others.

Potential medical applications of periplocin are focused on these areas:

- Anti-inflammatory effects. Periplocin and its derivatives have shown anti-inflammatory effects.
- Antitumor activity. A number of in vivo and in vitro studies suggest that periplocin inhibits tumor growth. Studies show both inhibition of growth as well as induction of apoptosis.
- Cardiotonic activity. Traditional use includes an application for heart failure. Structure and function of cardiac muscle were improved in rats.

Periplocin's metabolites, periplocymarin and periplogenin, have also shown some pharmacological effects.

Potential senolytic activity was suggested by an AI structural analysis of over 4,000 chemicals in 2013.
