= Bordeira (Fogo) =

Mountain in Cape Verde

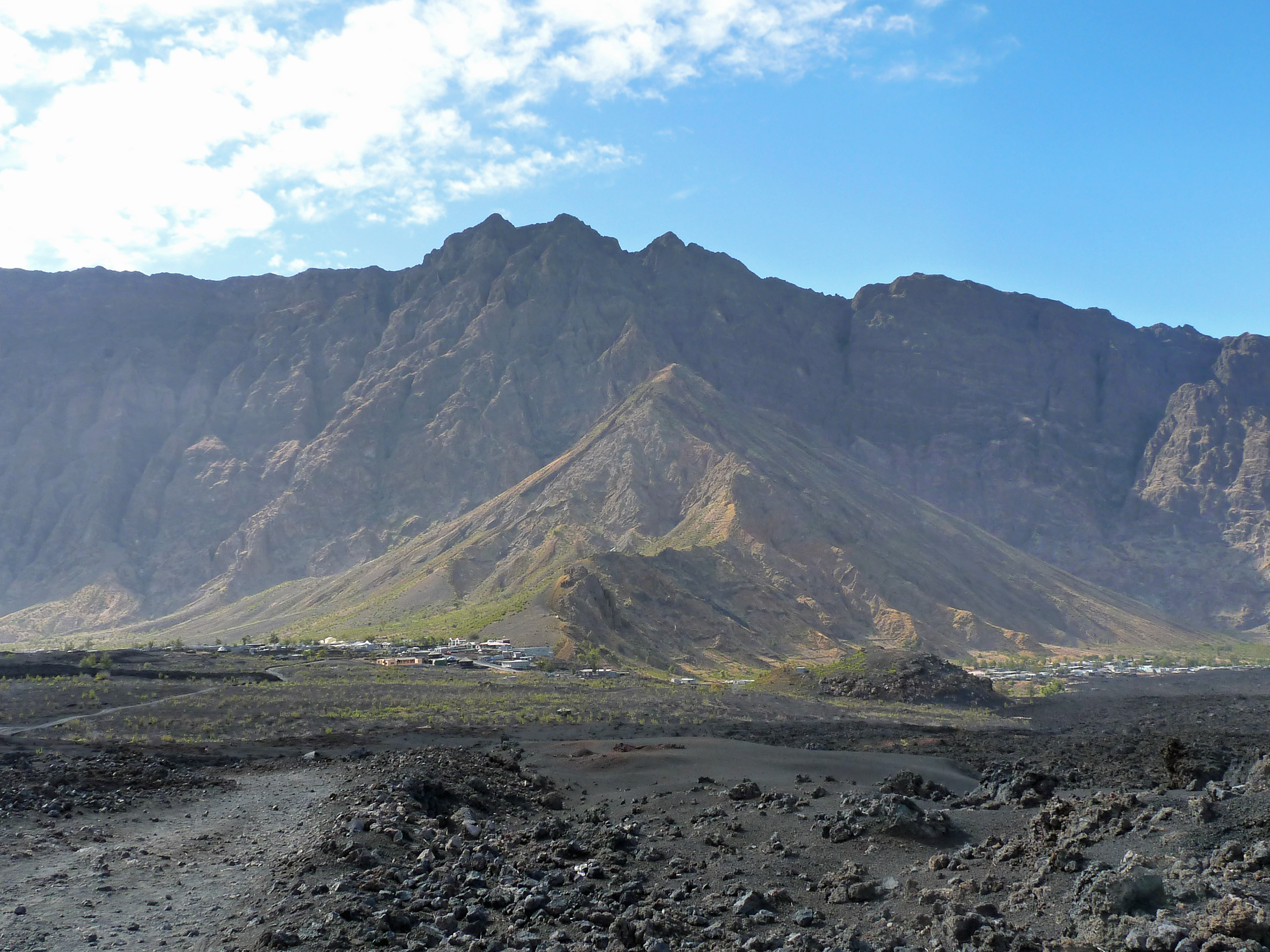
- Bordeira and its summit Pico de Caldeira seen from the foot of Pico do Fogo in 2012, before the most recent eruption

Highest point
- Elevation: 2,692 m (8,832 ft)
- Listing: List of mountains in Cape Verde
- Coordinates: 14°57′40″N 24°23′31″W

Geography
- Location within Cape Verde
- Location: central Fogo

Geology
- Mountain type: Stratovolcano

Bordeira is a semicircular mountain in the middle of the island Fogo. It is a crater rim, up to 1 km high, formed by a prehistoric collapse of the volcano Pico do Fogo. At a maximum elevation of 2,692 metres (8,832 ft), it is the second highest point in the nation behind Pico do Fogo. The name literally means the "border". It forms part of Fogo Natural Park. Opening to the east, it effectively protects the northern, western and southern part of the island against lava flows from the volcano. The settlement Chã das Caldeiras lies at the foot of Bordeira, in the caldera. The east side of the Bordeira cliff is much steeper than the west side.

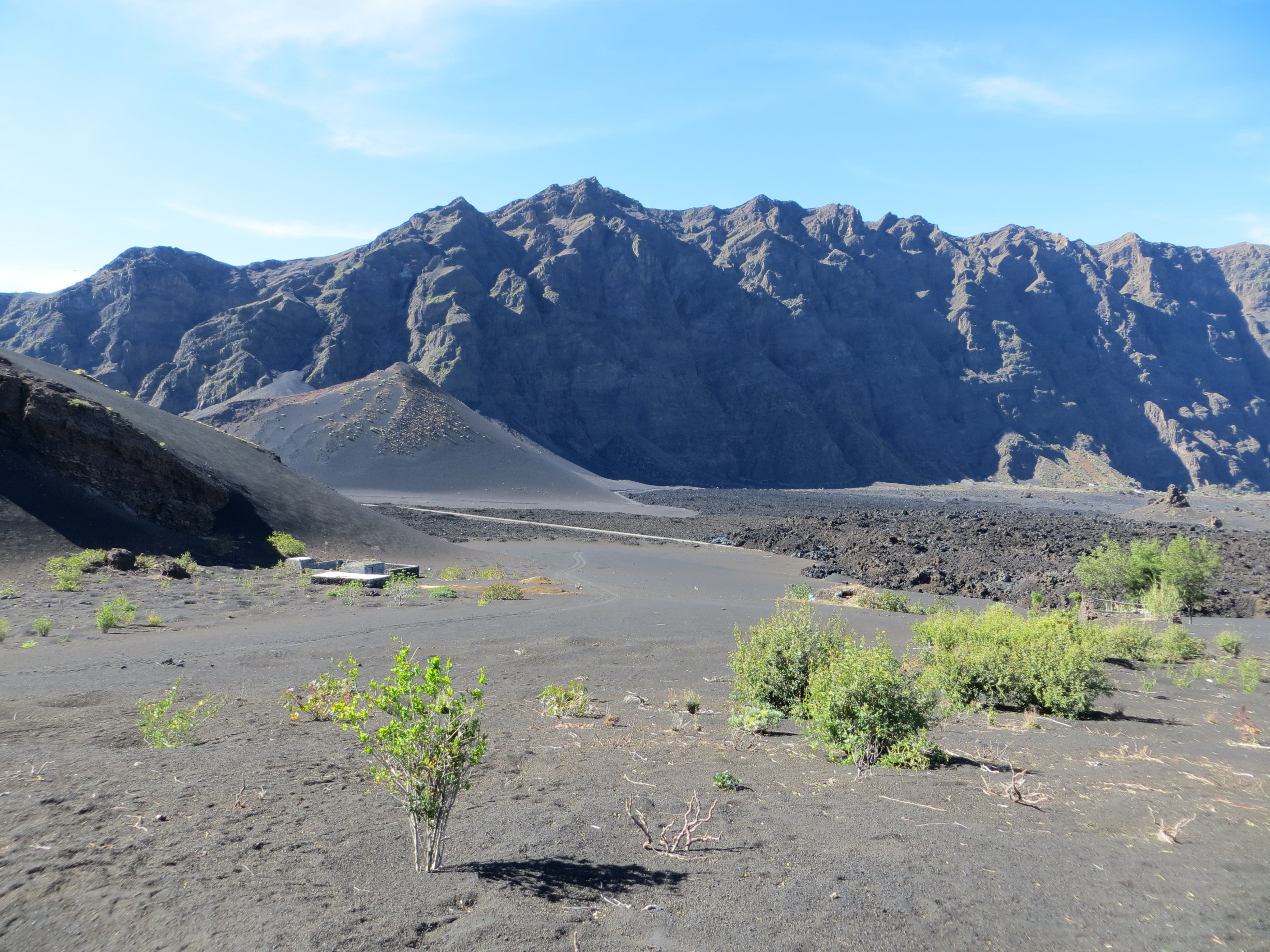
Bordeira, as it is after the 2014-15 eruption

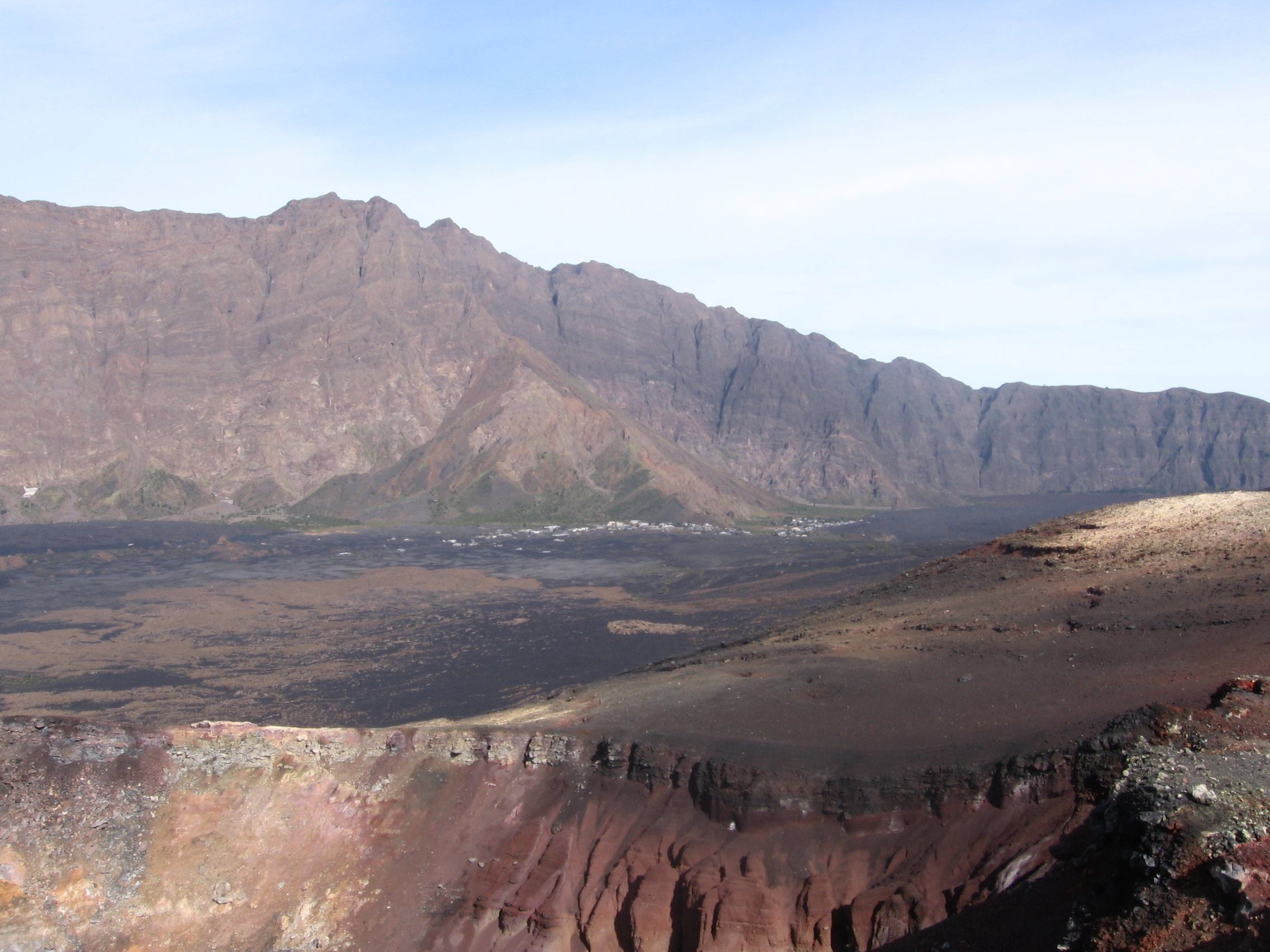
View of Bordeira along Chã das Caldeiras, as seen before the 2014-15 eruption

== See also ==
- List of mountains in Cape Verde
