= Fogo Natural Park =

Natural park in Cape Verde

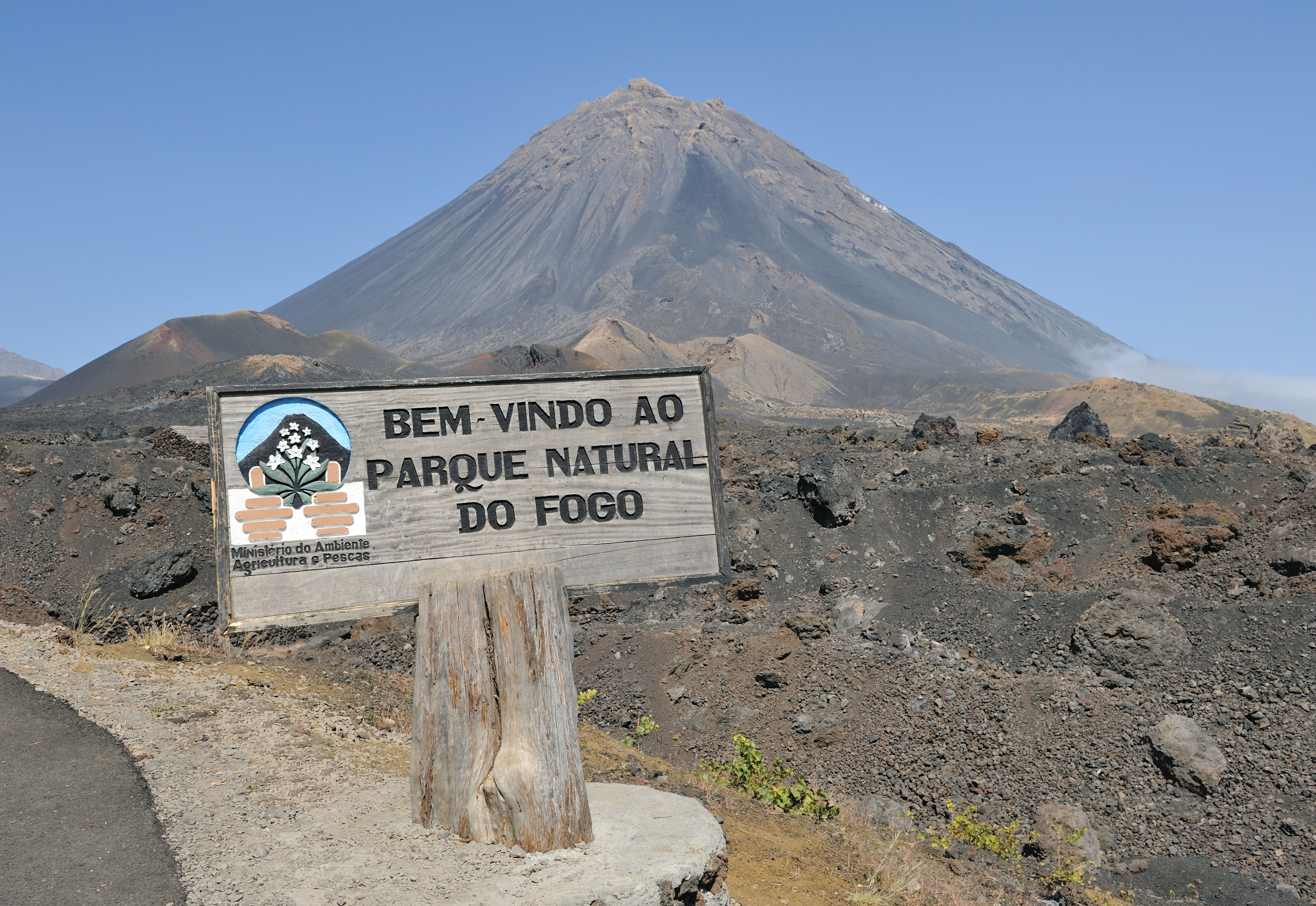
- Welcome sign into the Natural Park

- Location within Africa
- Coordinates: 14.95°N 24.36°W
- Area: 84.69 km^{2} (32.70 sq mi)

Fogo Natural Park (Portuguese: Parque Natural do Fogo) is a protected area located on Fogo Island in Cape Verde, an archipelago nation in the central Atlantic Ocean. Established in 2003, the park encompasses an area of 84.69 km^{2} (32.70 sq mi), representing 17.8% of the island's total landmass. It is geographically distributed across three municipalities in the region. The park incorporates the active stratovolcano of Pico do Fogo and the Monte Velha forests.

== Geography ==
Fogo is a protected area located on Fogo Island in Cape Verde, an island nation in the central Atlantic Ocean. The park was officially established on 24 February 2003, and is one of Cape Verde's ten natural parks. The protected area stretches for 84.69 km^{2} (32.70 sq mi), accounting for 17.8% of the total area of the island. About 50% of the park lies within the municipality Santa Catarina do Fogo, 28% in municipality of Mosteiros and 22% in São Filipe. The natural park is situated in the interior of the island, and the major feature of the topography is the active stratovolcano of Pico do Fogo. The park covers the volcano, its crater, crater rim and the forests of Monte Velha.

The volcano is the highest point in Cape Verde, rising to 2,829 m (9,281 ft) above sea level. The rim is situated at 2,700 m (8,900 ft) and the floor of the caldera is located at 1,625 m (5,331 ft). The caldera is approximately 9 km (5.6 mi) wide and has a gash in its eastern rim, allowing lava flows to reach the coast during eruptions. It is the only active volcano in the islands, and has encountered regular volcanic activity, with significant eruptions five times over the last five centuries. The most recent eruption was in 2014-15, which caused significant changes to the island. Earlier, grapes were grown on the inner slopes of the crater, and subsistence agriculture was practiced on the floor of the caldeira.

== Flora and fauna ==
Fogo national park and the surrounding oceans covering an area of 192 km^{2} (74 sq mi), is an Important Bird Area. Major bird species found including Fea's petrel, Boyd's shearwater and Cape Verde swift. The endemic plants Echium vulcanorum (endangered) and Erysimum caboverdeanum (critically endangered) are only found on the outer crater rim of the volcano of Fogo.
