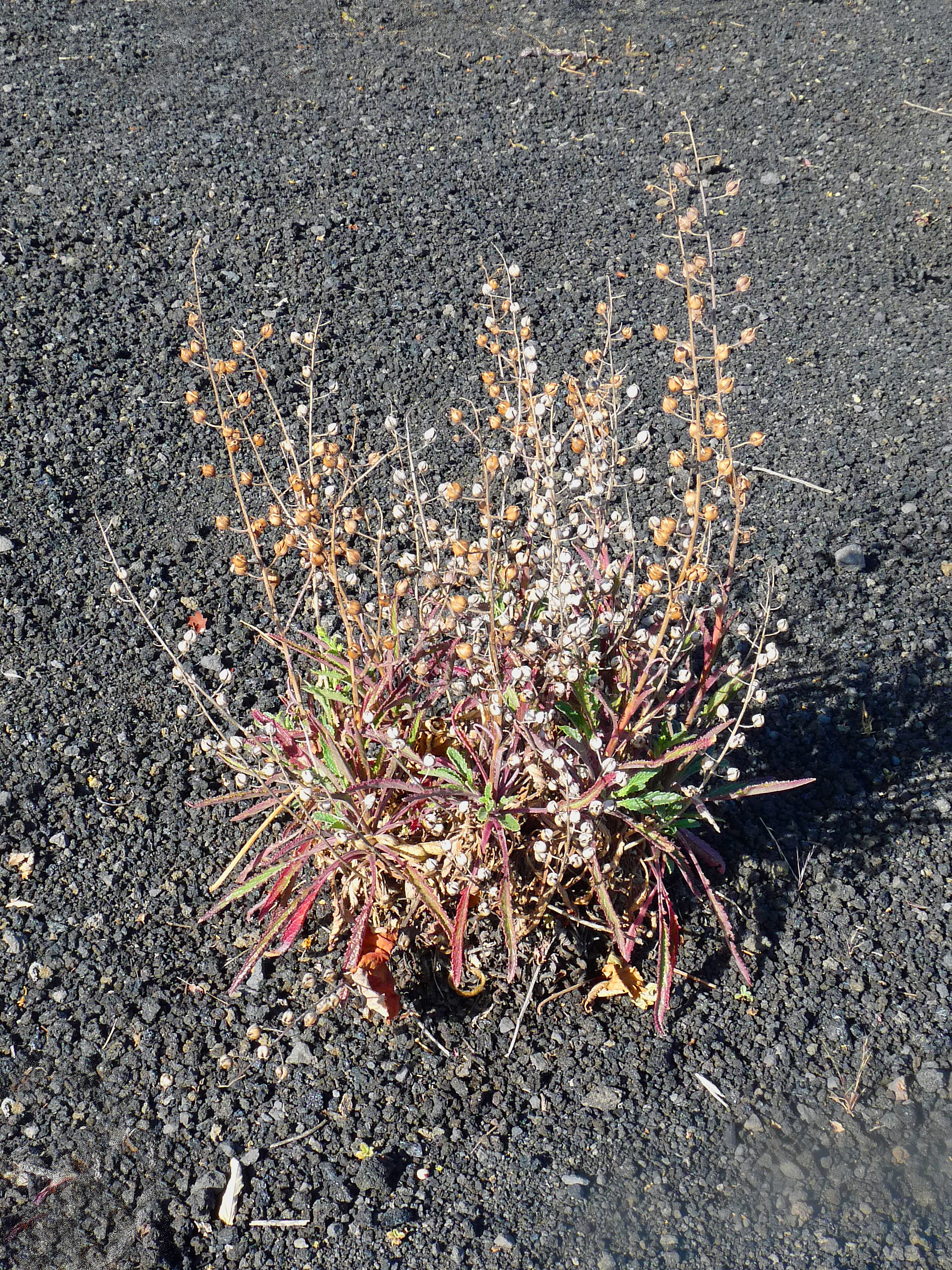
- Verbascum cystolithicum in Chã das Caldeiras

Conservation status
- Endangered (IUCN 3.1)

Scientific classification
- Kingdom: Plantae
- Clade: Tracheophytes
- Clade: Angiosperms
- Clade: Eudicots
- Clade: Asterids
- Order: Lamiales
- Family: Scrophulariaceae
- Genus: Verbascum
- Species: V. cystolithicum

Binomial name
- Verbascum cystolithicum (Pett.) Hub.-Mor., 1973

Synonyms
- Celsia cystolithica Pett.

= Verbascum cystolithicum =

Species of flowering plant

Verbascum cystolithicum is a species of flowers in the family Scrophulariaceae. The species is endemic to Cape Verde. The species was first described in 1960 by Bror Johan Petterson, who placed it in the genus Celsia. Arthur Huber-Morath placed it in the Verbascum species in 1973. Its local name is mato-branco, which may also refer to two other plants.

Verbascum cystolithicum is only found in the mountainous area of the island of Fogo, above 1300 m elevation.
