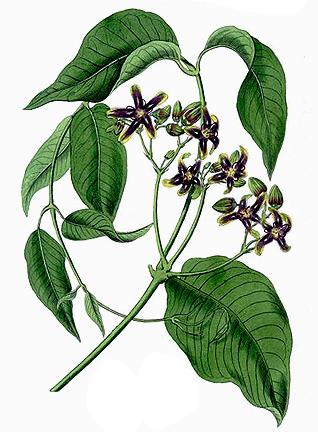
- Periploca graeca

Scientific classification
- Kingdom: Plantae
- Clade: Tracheophytes
- Clade: Angiosperms
- Clade: Eudicots
- Clade: Asterids
- Order: Gentianales
- Family: Apocynaceae
- Genus: Periploca
- Species: P. graeca

Binomial name
- Periploca graeca L.

= Periploca graeca =

Silkvine

Species of vine

Periploca graeca, the silkvine, is an ornamental plant in the family Apocynaceae. It is native to southern Europe and the Middle East, and is sparingly naturalized in scattered locations in the eastern United States.

The bark of Periploca graeca contains the toxic cardenolide glycoside periplocin with activity similar to digitoxin. The essential oil of the stem bark contains the fragrant phenolic compound 2-hydroxy-4-methoxybenzaldehyde, a positional isomer of vanillin.
