= Chã das Caldeiras =

- Settlement
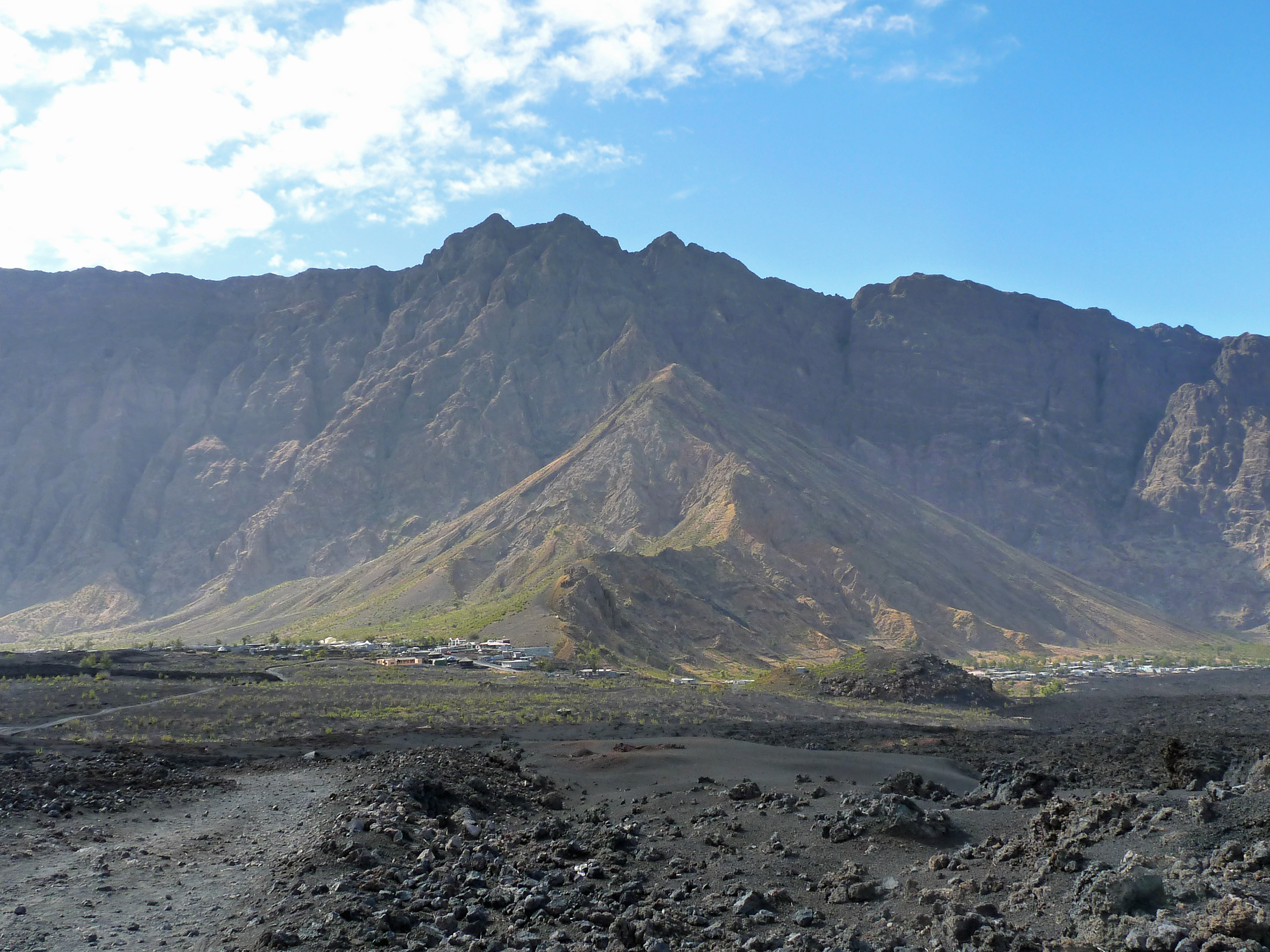
- Village of Chã das Caldeiras before the 2014–15 eruption

- Location within Cape Verde
- Coordinates: 14.971°N 24.367°W
- Country: Cape Verde
- Island: Fogo
- Municipality: Santa Catarina do Fogo
- Civil parish: Santa Catarina do Fogo

Population (2010)
  - Total: 697
- ID: 83102

Chã das Caldeiras (Portuguese: [ˈʃɐ̃ dɐʃ kalˈdɐjɾɐʃ]; lit. 'Plain of the Calderas') is a small community of approximately 700 inhabitants in the crater of the volcano Pico do Fogo on the island of Fogo, Cape Verde. The village consists of two main neighborhoods: Portela and Bangaeira, founded in 1920 and 1917, respectively. At an elevation of about 1,700 meters, it is the highest village in Cape Verde. It is part of the municipality of Santa Catarina do Fogo. The main organizing body in the village is the Associação dos Agricultores de Chã (Chã Farmers Association), an agricultural cooperative that holds considerable sway over the local economy. Chã is the only area in Cape Verde that grows significant quantities of grapes and produces export-quality wines.

There is no running water or electricity in Chã, though residents are increasingly using generators at night to light and power their homes. All non-drinking water is collected rainwater, stored in large cistern tanks for use in the dry season (November to July).

== History ==
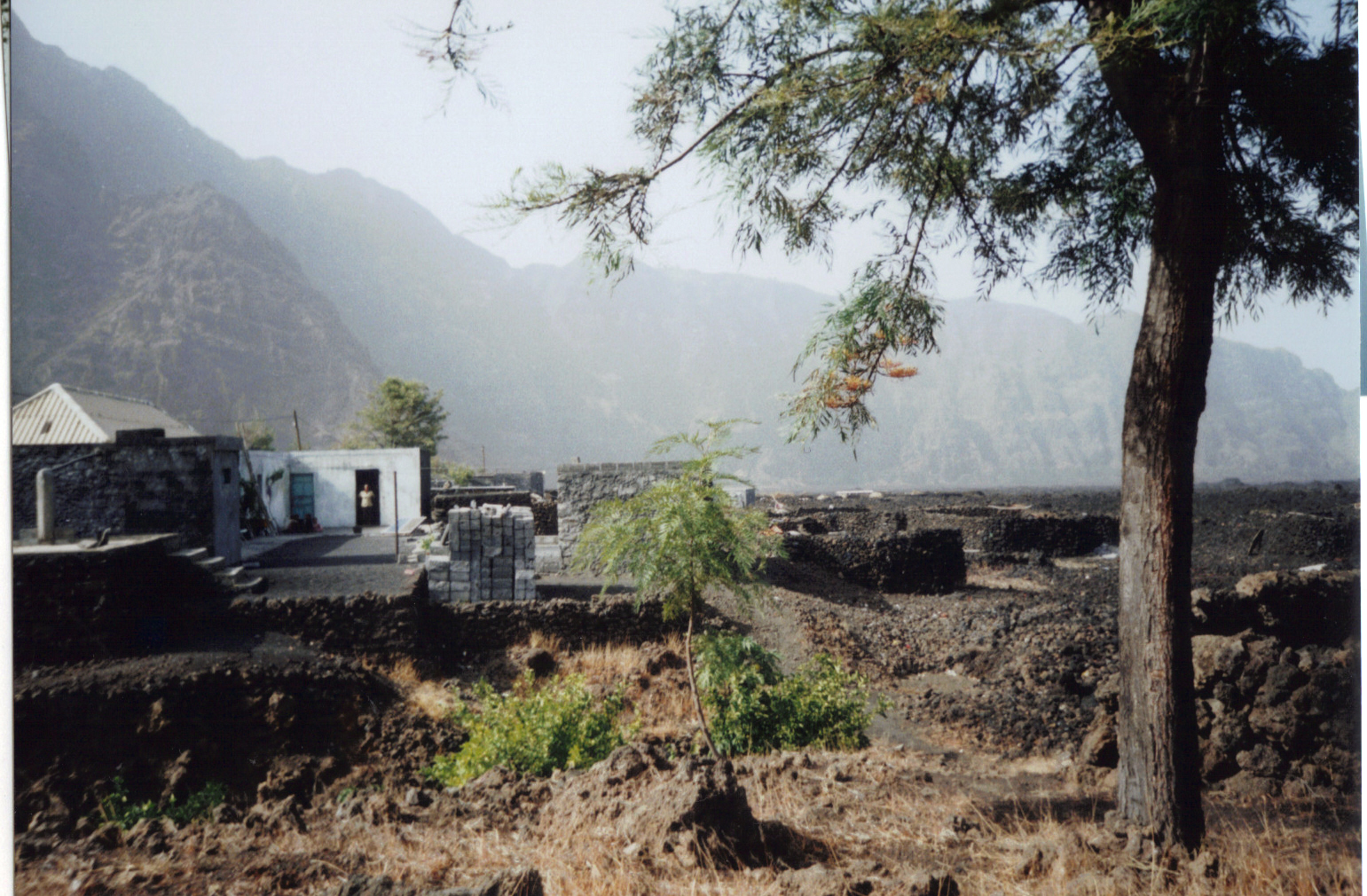
Village of Bangaeira before the November 2014 – February 2015 eruption

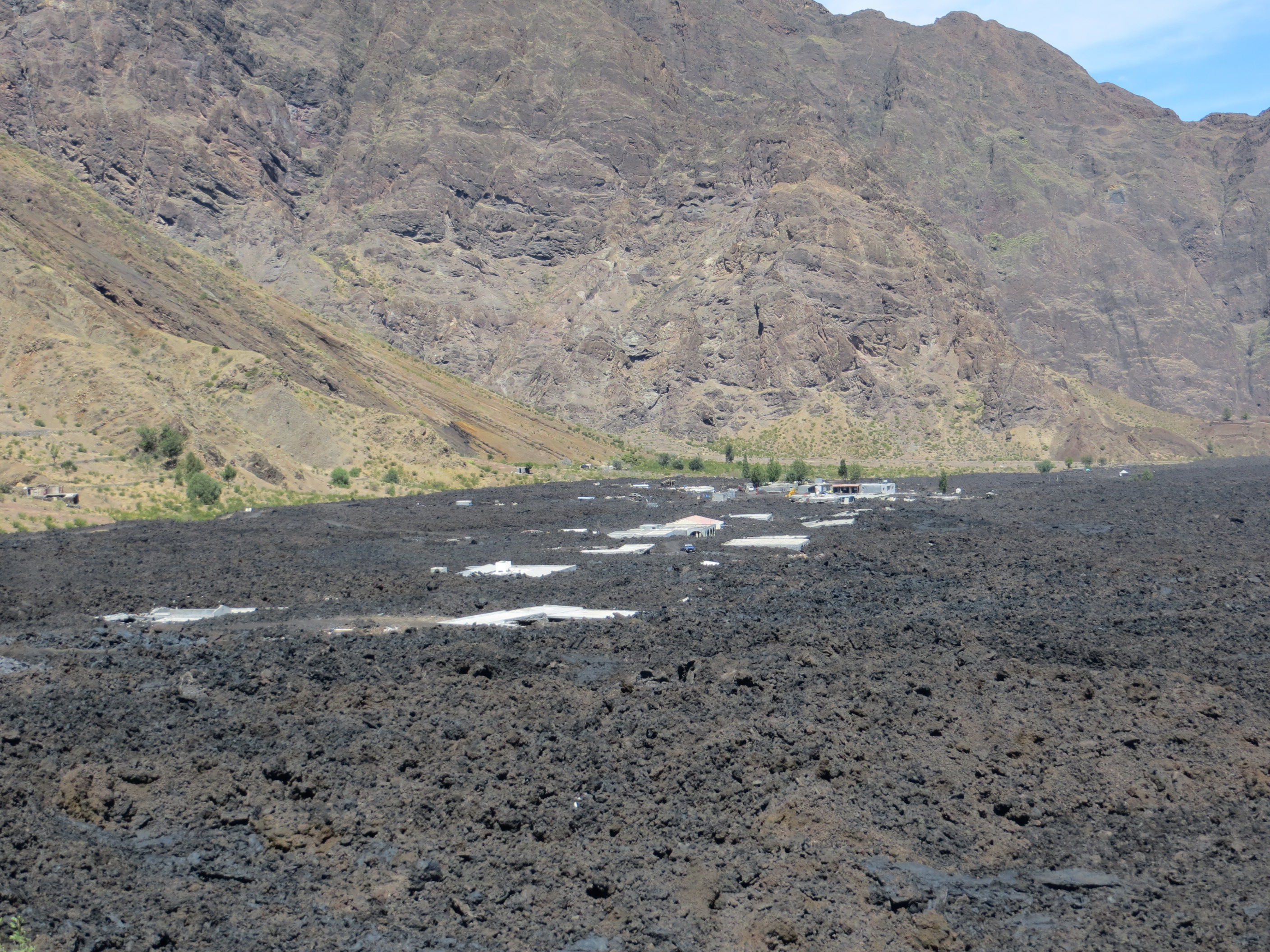
Bangaeira in the aftermath of the 2014–15 eruption, remains of some buildings still exists, some houses were covered with lava, several suffered damages

=== The Count Of Montrond ===
In 1870, the Count of Montrond (François Louis Armand Fourcheut De Montrond, France) stopped on the island en route to Brazil. He brought with him the vines that kicked off wine production in the caldera. He also produced coffee and exported it to Portugal. With his background in engineering and medicine, he oversaw construction of a road from Sao Filipe to Mosteiros and sank wells that are still in use today. Proficient in the use of herbs and herbal remedies, he imported medicinal herbs for use on the island.

At the age of 60, he fell off of a horse and died of an infection in a broken leg.

Many of the inhabitants of Chã, with their light skin, blond hair, and blue eyes, can trace their ancestry back to the biologically prolific Count of Montrond.

=== Eruptions ===
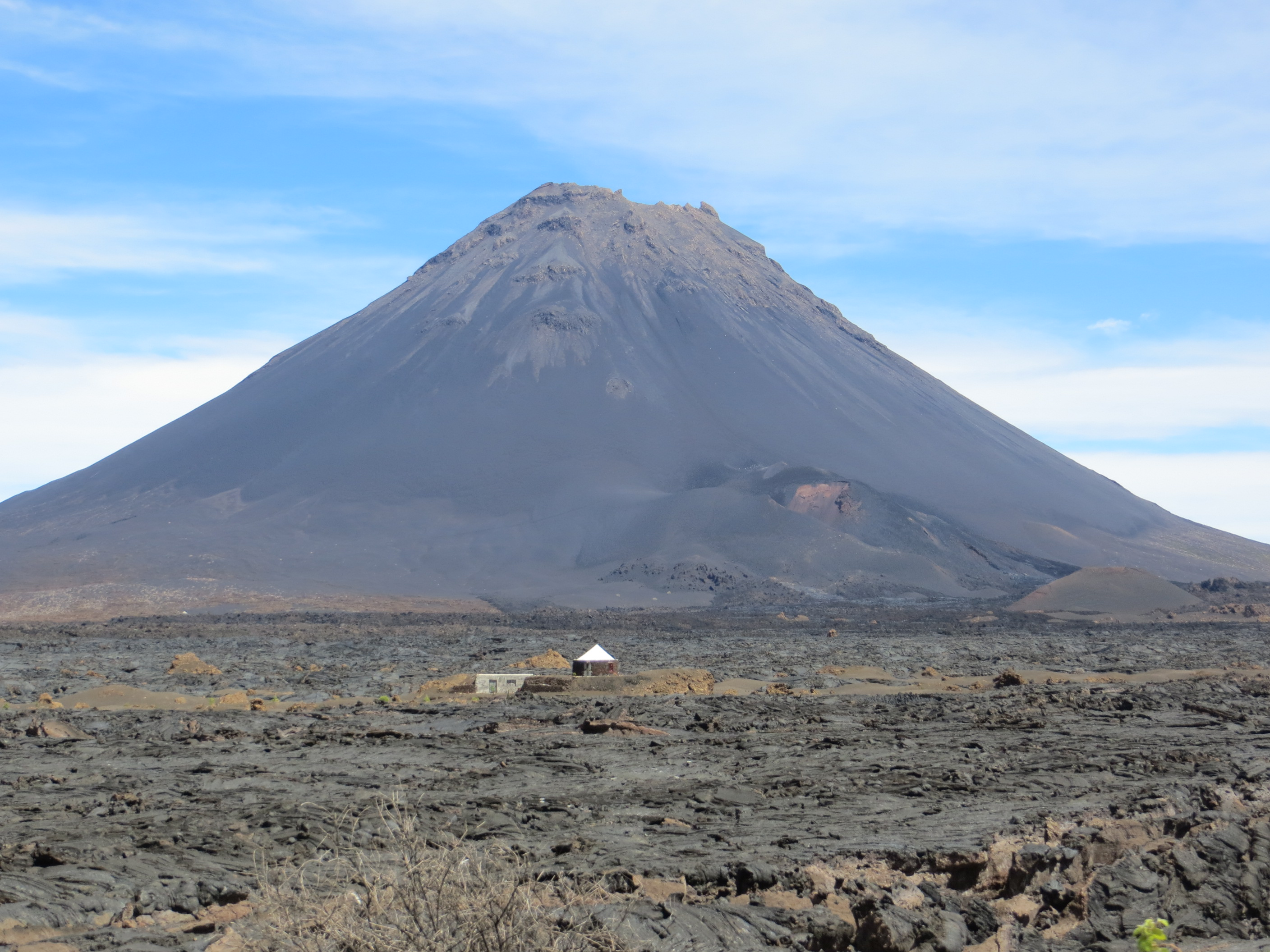
Two years after the 2014–15 eruption, these were some buildings that survived the lava flows

In April 1995, an eruption of the Pico do Fogo damaged several houses in Chã das Caldeiras. Pico do Fogo erupted again in November 2014, destroying 75% of the buildings in Portela, Bangaeira and Ilhéu de Losna. Most of these were covered by lava. After the eruption, the majority of the inhabitants left the village. Cabeça Fundão on the park's edge became the seat of the natural park. A few homes have been rebuilt.

== Natural setting ==
A large crater rim with 1000-meter escarpments, called the Bordeira, encircles the village. On the plain is one large volcanic peak (2,829 m from sea level) and several smaller peaks and lava fields from recent eruptions, most notably 1951, 1995 and 2014 (during which the entire population had to be evacuated). The entire caldera, some 67 km^{2}, is a protected area as part of the Fogo Natural Park (Parque Natural do Fogo), a cooperative effort between the German and Cape Verdean governments.

== Flora and fauna ==
=== Endemic plants ===
84% of the endemic plants (31 total species) on Fogo are located in Chã and on the Bordeira. 48% of these are designated as rare and/or threatened on the Ministry of Environment, Agriculture, and Fisheries' (MAAP) “Red List,” which includes the species Cynanchum daltonii, Echium volcanorum, Erysimum caboverdeanum, Verbascum cystolithicum, Lavandula rotundifolia, Periploca laevigata sp. chevalieri, Euphorbia tuckeyana, and Tornabenea bischoffii and the genus Diplotaxis. These plants are specifically adapted to the caldera's climate (periodically, Chã receives frost during the winter months) and volcanic soils. Chã's endemic plants, along with its unique terrain, are under increasing strain due to overgrazing and to the fuel and fodder collecting of the local populations.

=== Fauna ===
Its fauna mainly include insects, not as many in the lower areas, it is one of the places where it is non-existent. A warbler, the Cape Verde warbler (Acrocephalus brevipennis) are one of several places in the island that are not founded as their habitat is up to 1,300 meters of elevation.

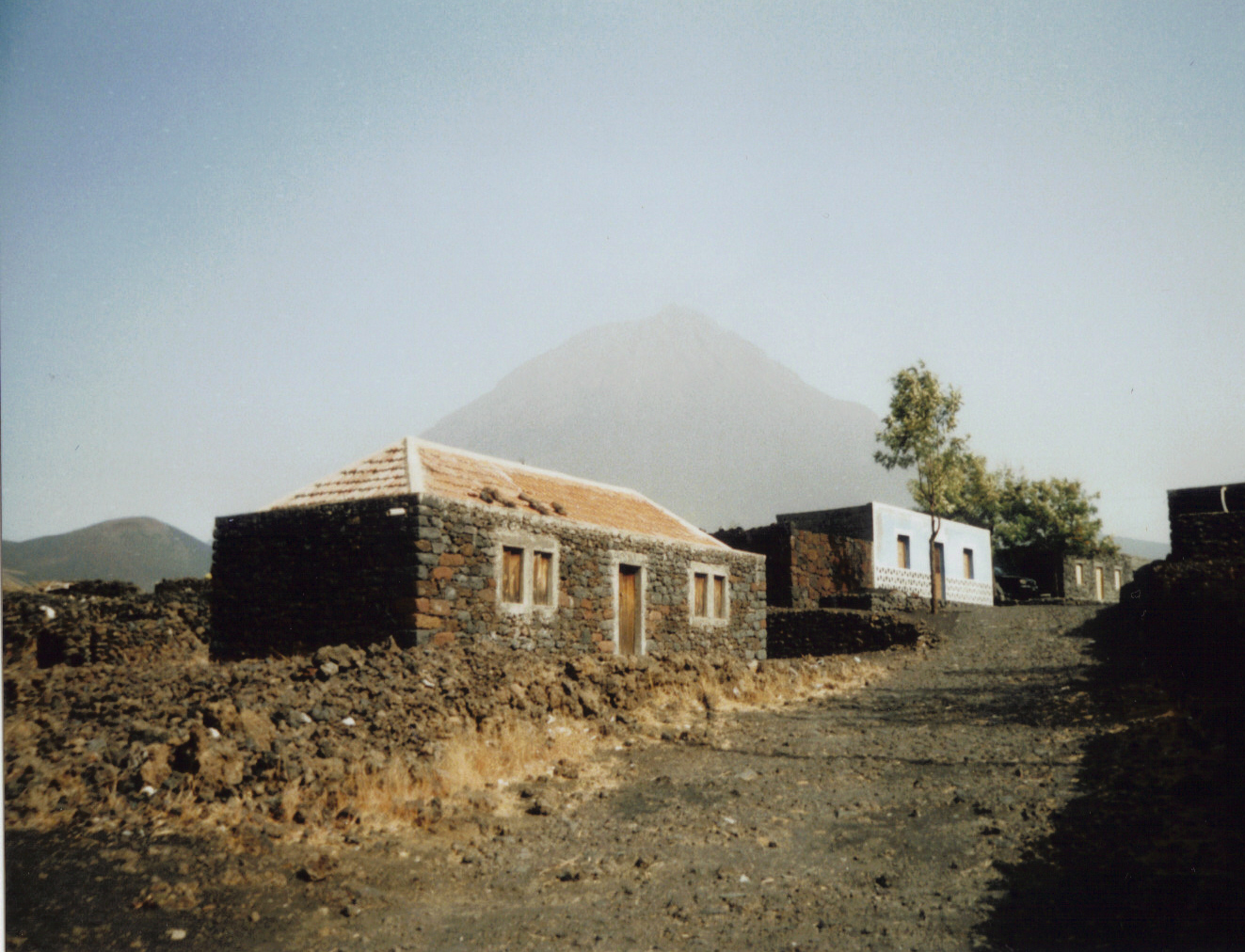
Main Street of Bangaeira before the 2014-15 eruption, much of it were covered with lava and is now earthened

== Climate ==
Unlike the rest of the archipelago (which has an extremely dry, arid, and warm variation of a desert climate), Chã das Caldeiras has a cool semi-arid climate (Köppen BSk) due to its elevation, which also makes it Cape Verde's coolest village. Due to its climate, it has a cool average temperature at 13.5 °C or 56.3 °F, and a relatively high amount of rain (for Cape Verdean standards) at 524 millimetres or 20.63 inches; the largest amount of which falls in September (198 millimetres or 7.80 inches). It is also a factor that enables the village to grow and withhold a grape and winery industry; something that could hardly be achieved or sustained in any of its low-lying counterparts.

Climate data for Chã das Caldeiras, 1,764 metres (5,787 feet) ASL
| Month | Jan | Feb | Mar | Apr | May | Jun | Jul | Aug | Sep | Oct | Nov | Dec | Year |
|---|---|---|---|---|---|---|---|---|---|---|---|---|---|
| Mean daily maximum °C (°F) | 14.8 (58.6) | 14.9 (58.8) | 15.4 (59.7) | 15.9 (60.6) | 16.4 (61.5) | 17.1 (62.8) | 17.7 (63.9) | 18.3 (64.9) | 18.9 (66.0) | 18.4 (65.1) | 17.4 (63.3) | 15.4 (59.7) | 16.7 (62.1) |
| Daily mean °C (°F) | 11.7 (53.1) | 11.5 (52.7) | 11.8 (53.2) | 12.3 (54.1) | 13.1 (55.6) | 13.7 (56.7) | 14.5 (58.1) | 15.2 (59.4) | 15.6 (60.1) | 15.5 (59.9) | 14.2 (57.6) | 12.7 (54.9) | 13.5 (56.3) |
| Mean daily minimum °C (°F) | 8.7 (47.7) | 8.2 (46.8) | 8.3 (46.9) | 8.8 (47.8) | 9.8 (49.6) | 10.4 (50.7) | 11.3 (52.3) | 12.2 (54.0) | 12.3 (54.1) | 12.6 (54.7) | 11.1 (52.0) | 10.1 (50.2) | 10.3 (50.6) |
| Average rainfall mm (inches) | 11 (0.4) | 6 (0.2) | 3 (0.1) | 0 (0) | 0 (0) | 2 (0.1) | 49 (1.9) | 151 (5.9) | 198 (7.8) | 67 (2.6) | 25 (1.0) | 12 (0.5) | 524 (20.5) |
Source: Climate-Data.ORG

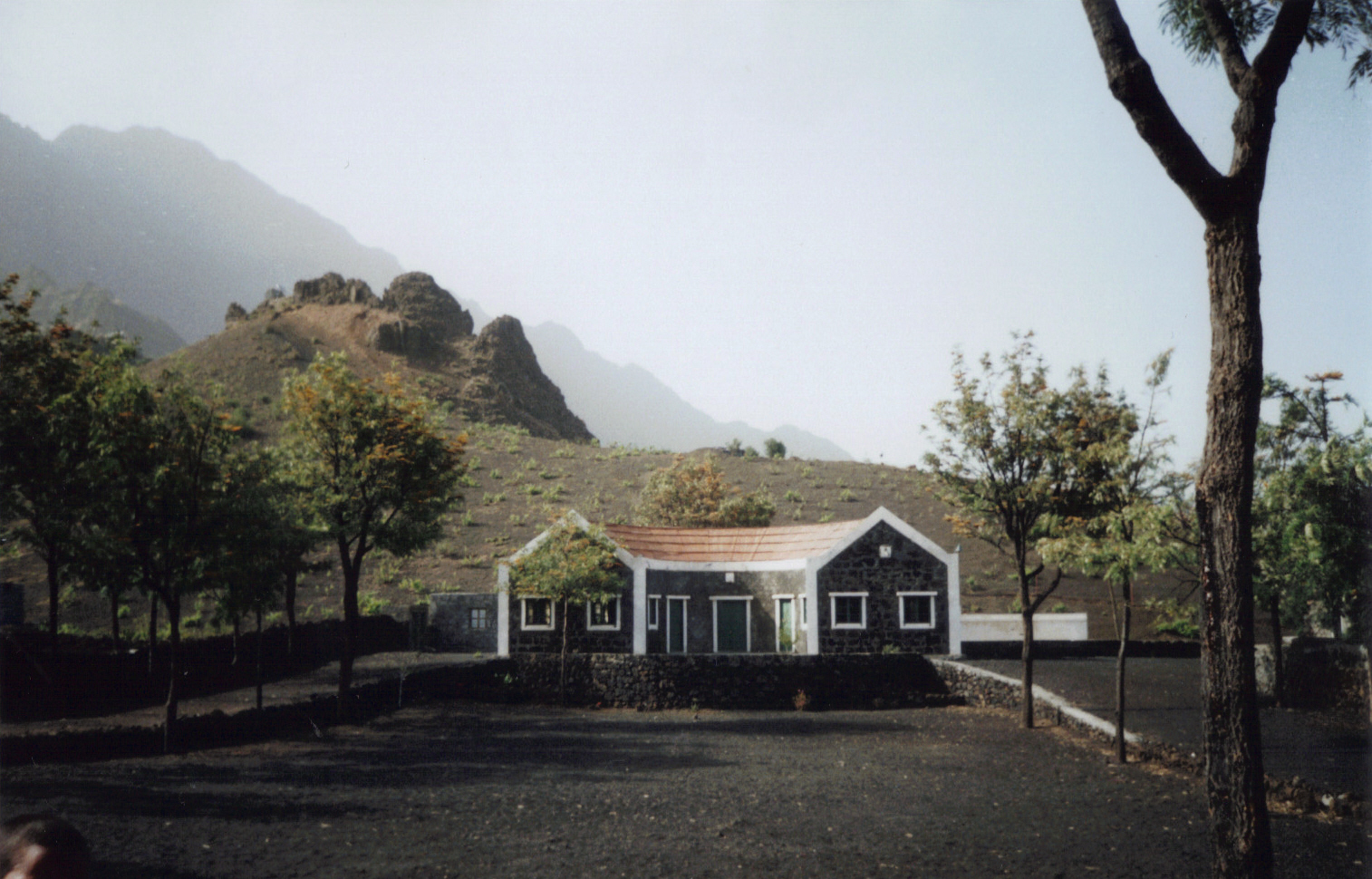
Catholic Church of Portela.

== Agriculture ==
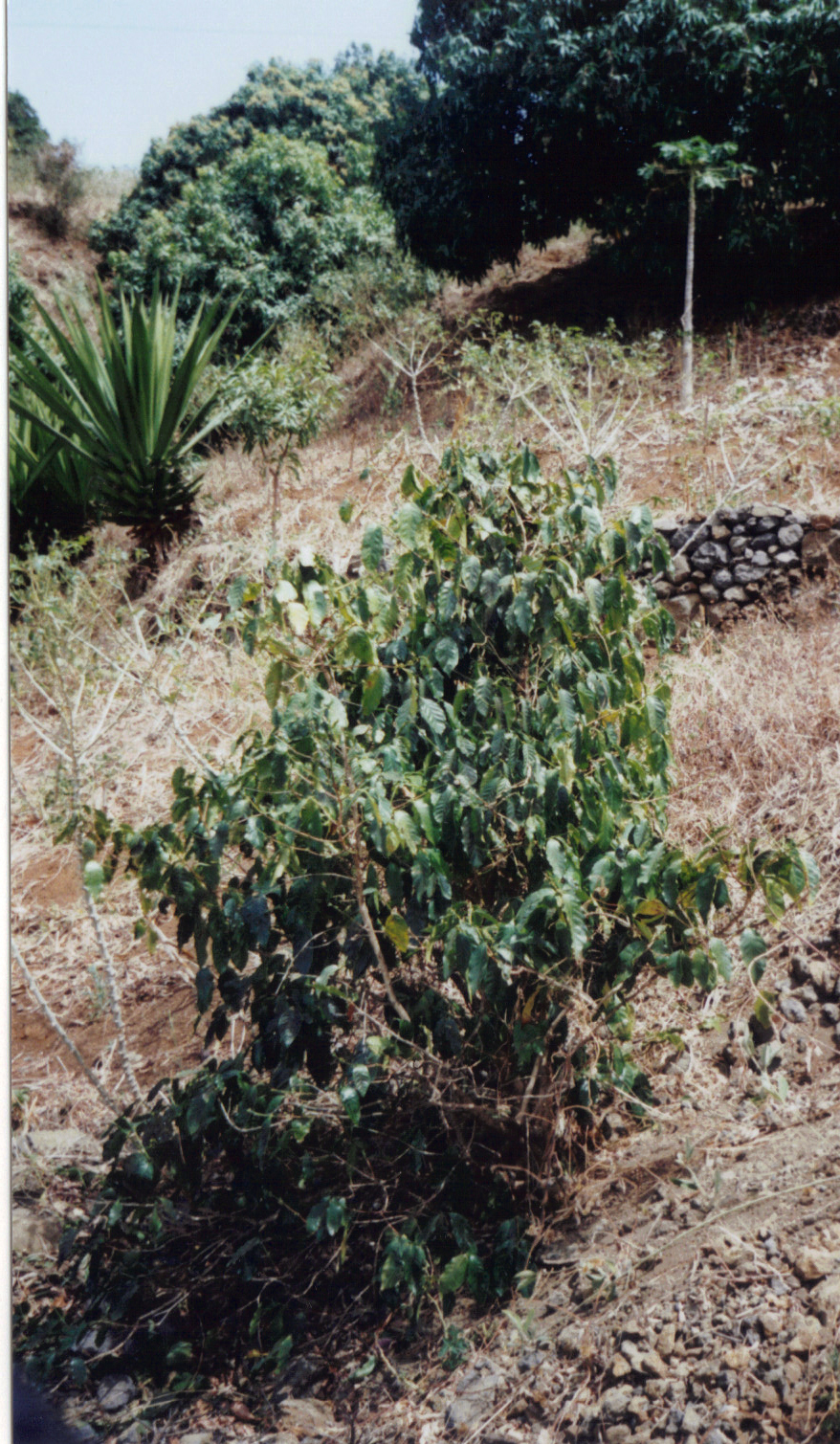
Coffee plant near Mosteiros.

Chã has a lot of vegetation (albeit not in the lava fields), which grows in the rich volcanic soils adjacent to the crater rim. Because of its altitude (elevation 1,629 m), Chã is blessed with milder temperatures and greater precipitation than surrounding areas.

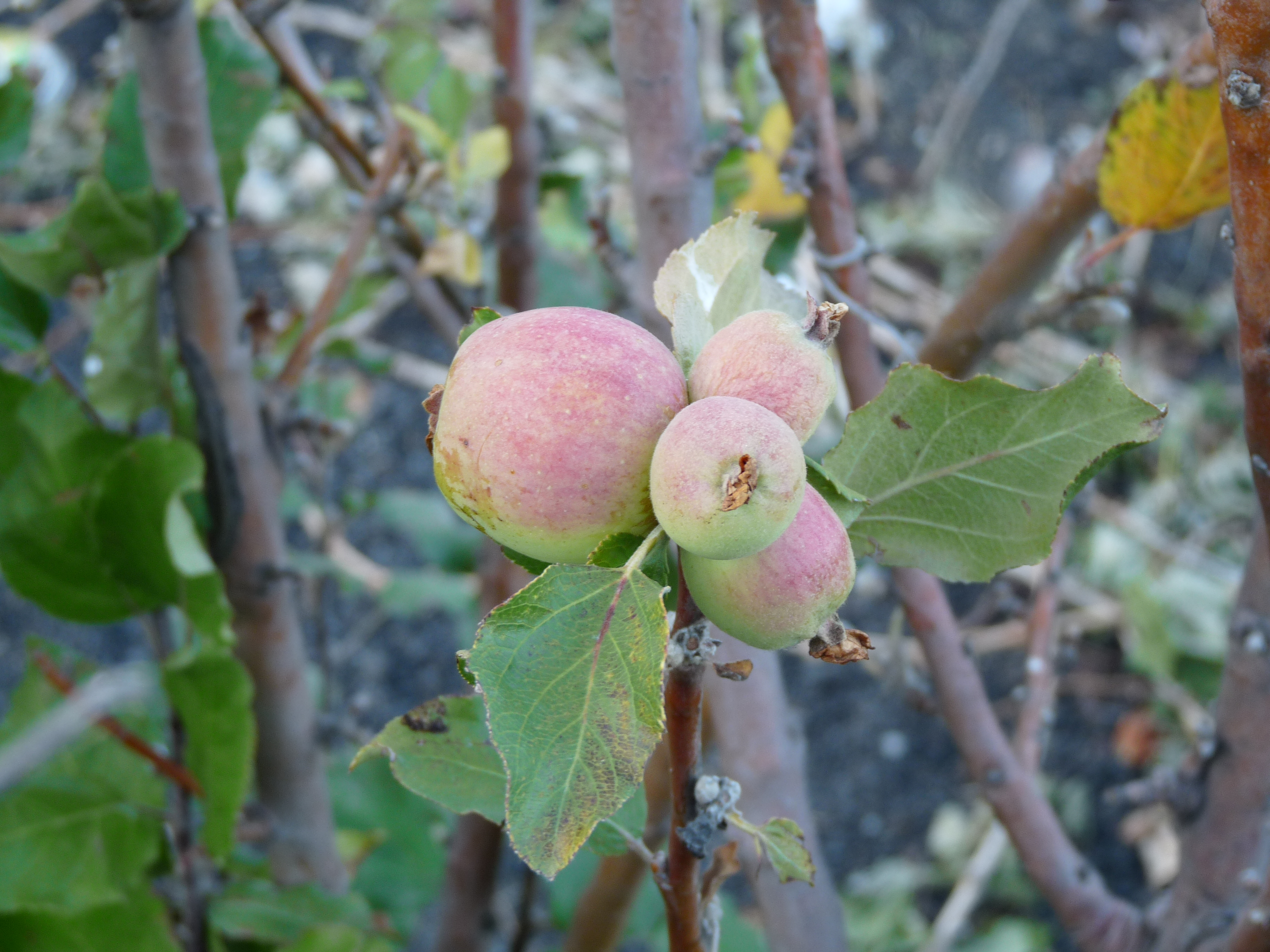
Chã das Caldeiras apples in growth.

Products in the caldera include fruits (apples, grapes, quince fruit, pomegranate, figs, peaches and tomatoes) and vegetables (beans, corn, potatoes, yams, manioc, and peppers) for local consumption and commercial production. The Associação buys excess fruit from the local farmers and turns it into white, red, rosé, and passito wine (label “Chã”); grape (grappa), apple, quince, and peach spirits (label “Espírito da Caldeira”); apple, quince, and peach marmalade; grape, fig, and quince compotes; apple and pomegranate jelly; and pomegranate and grape juice for commercial sale.

Also famous is home-made goat cheese, queijo de cabra. The Associação also roasts and grinds Fogo coffee, Café do Fogo (label “Café das Caldeiras”), grown on the northern flank of the island. The local economy is based primarily on this specialty agriculture and animal-raising, the majority of which is sold domestically or to tourists. The “Chã” label wines, however, are available outside of the country on a limited basis, especially in Cape Verdean enclaves in Massachusetts, Lisbon, Paris, and Rotterdam.

== Wines and Pomace brandy ==
The “Chã” label wines, made by the Associação (with help from the Italian NGO Cospe and the EU), are full-bodied and rich in color and extract. All of the grapes used in the wines are locally grown by farmers inside the caldera, which has a 120-year wine-making tradition. The first wines made in the crater to be exported were sent to Brazil and Guinea-Bissau, then a Portuguese colony like Cape Verde.

Chã's climate and terrain are optimal for viticulture. Days are usually hot and dry, nights cool and humid. With sufficient rain, high-quality, semi-sweet grapes grow (1.2 km^{2} total) in the caldera's rich volcanic soils. In 2006, the Associação produced 40,000 cases of wine (12 bottles each) from 100,000 kg of grapes. The percentage of alcohol in the “Chã” wines (14%) is greater than what is found in wines from the EU or California (usually between 11.5 and 12.5%).

The red wine, vinho tinto, made from the low-lying Portuguese preta tradicional variety of grapes, has a dark red color with shades of purple. Odors include tones and flavors of small, dark fruits like the currant or blackberry; also present are shades of pepper and Muscat nut. The wine's has a rich body, and is often advised for serving at room temperature (20 °C). The tannins are soft, present even when the wine has not been aged.

The white wine, vinho branco, made from locally grown Moscatel grapes, has a fresh taste, unique clarity, and golden shades. Odors include that of semi-sweet citric fruits like the grapefruit. The white also has a subtle, residual sweetness. This wine is often recommended to be served at 10 °C and can be saved for 2–3 years in certain storage conditions.

The rosé wine, vinho rosé, uses a similar variety of dark grapes as the red. It has an elegant rose color with flavors of small, sweet fruits like currants and strawberries. Like the white, the rosé is fresh on the palate, also recommended for drinking at 10 °C. It too can be consumed up to three years.

New to the “Chã” family of wines is the sweet vinho passito, made with the same Moscatel variety of grapes as the vinho branco. However, unlike with the white, the grapes used for the passito are first sun-dried, after which these uvas passas, or raisins, are put through the regular fermentation and filtration processes. Because dried grapes are used, the alcohol content in the passito is lower, at about 10.6%, than what is found in the other “Chã” wines (14%). The passito has a dark amber color; is slightly more viscous than the white, red, and rosé; and has a acidity to balance its sweetness. Odors include that of figs and dried fruits like raisins, prunes and dates. The passito is ideal between 12° and 14 °C as either a post-dinner or dessert wine or, simply, as a “wine of meditation.”

=== Wine making at the Associação ===
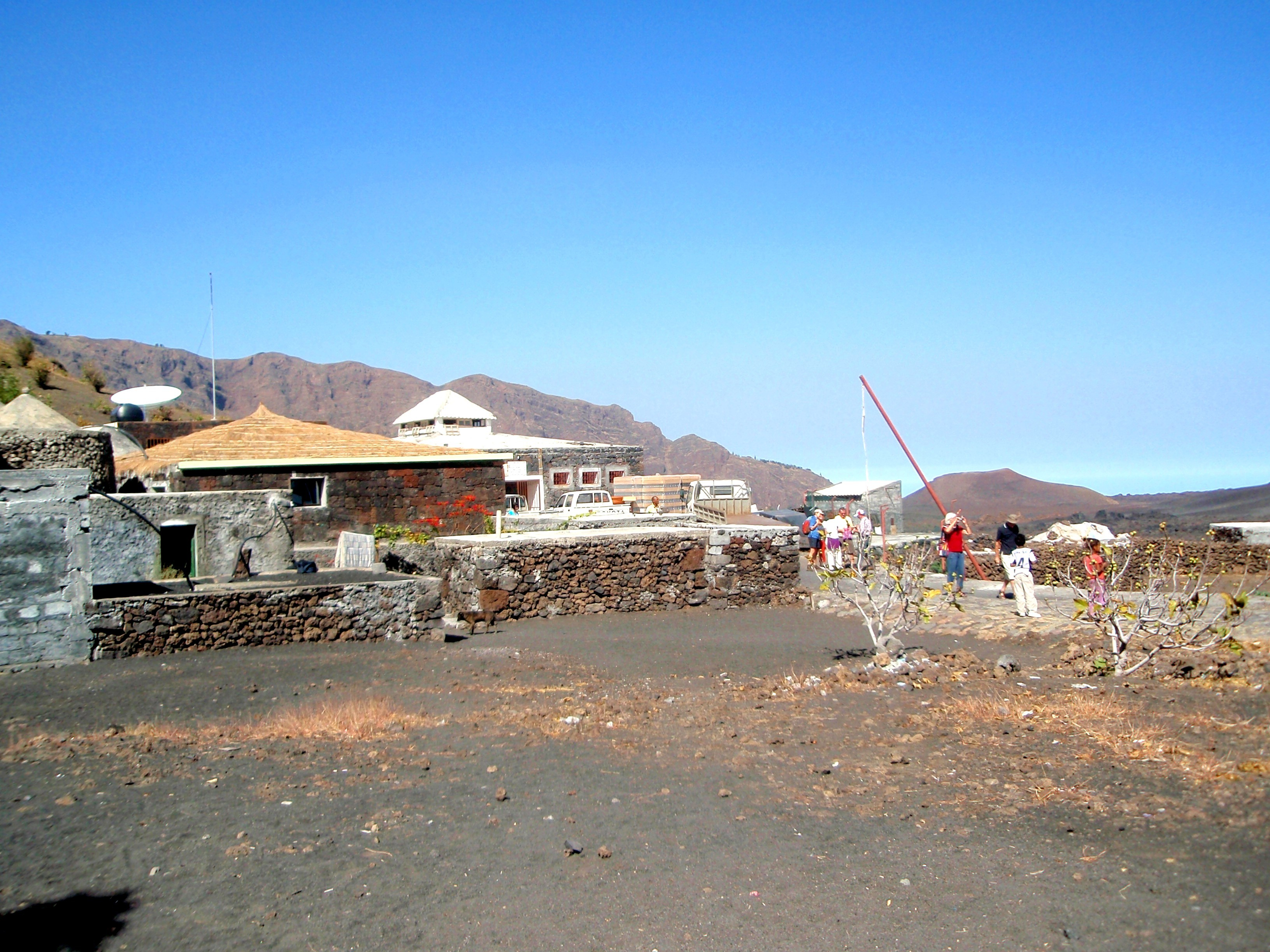
Cooperative (Associação dos Agricultores de Chã) in Portela

During the wine-making process, much attention is given to the hygienic conditions of the cellar and machines. After arrival, the grapes are cleaned and are either crushed (to make red wine) or pressed (to make white and rosé). This process is done as quickly as possible to prevent contamination and odor. The pulp is then put in specially designed barrels in the cellar, where the temperature remains cool even during the hottest days, to begin the fermentation process. This is when the sugar of the grapes turns to alcohol and where the unique characteristics of the wine begin to develop.

The red wine ferments with the grape skins and is pressed afterwards. Then, the wine is fermented for a second time to eliminate remaining bacteria and reduce its vinegar-like acidity. After the second fermentation, the young wine is filtered and drawn into barrels for conservation. The white and rosé wines, on the other hand, are immediately filtered after the first fermentation to maintain freshness and to avoid bacteria growth. Until the wines are bottled, they remain in barrels (to avoid exposure to sunlight and air), except for periodic filtrations to improve clarity.

=== Manecom ===
Chã's best-known wine, however, is called Manecom, a traditional, semi-sweet or -dry, house-made wine. (It should not be confused with the “Chã” label red, white, rosé, and passito wines.) Most households make Manecom for commercial production and personal consumption. The wine can either be a red or white, dry or sweet, but the sweet red variety is by far the most popular.

Manecom gets its name, legend has it, from a man named Manuel Montrond, supposedly the first person to live in Chã. Manuel Montrond in Portuguese, took a liking to the strong, sweet red wine he made. Other inhabitants coined Manuel's wine Manecom. The name stuck and remains to this day.

=== Vinha Maria Chaves wines ===
New since 2012 is the harvesting of grapes and the production of wines by "Vinha Maria Chaves", a new vineyard created during the last 10 years. The vineyard is about 25 hectares of surface and is located just beneath the crater. Adjoining, there is the newly constructed winery "Adega de Monte Barro", for the vinification, aging and bottling of the wines. 4 qualities of wines are produced : santaLuzia (white), sanVicente (rosé), sanTiago (red) and sanFilipe (red). These wines are produced with the grapes from the Maria Chaves vineyard and grapes from Chã das Caldeiras . These wines will be mainly exported. During the festivities of April 30, 2013, the "Adega de Monte Barro" was inaugurated and the new wines were presented to the President, the prime minister and other officials of Cape Verde.

=== Pomace brandy ===
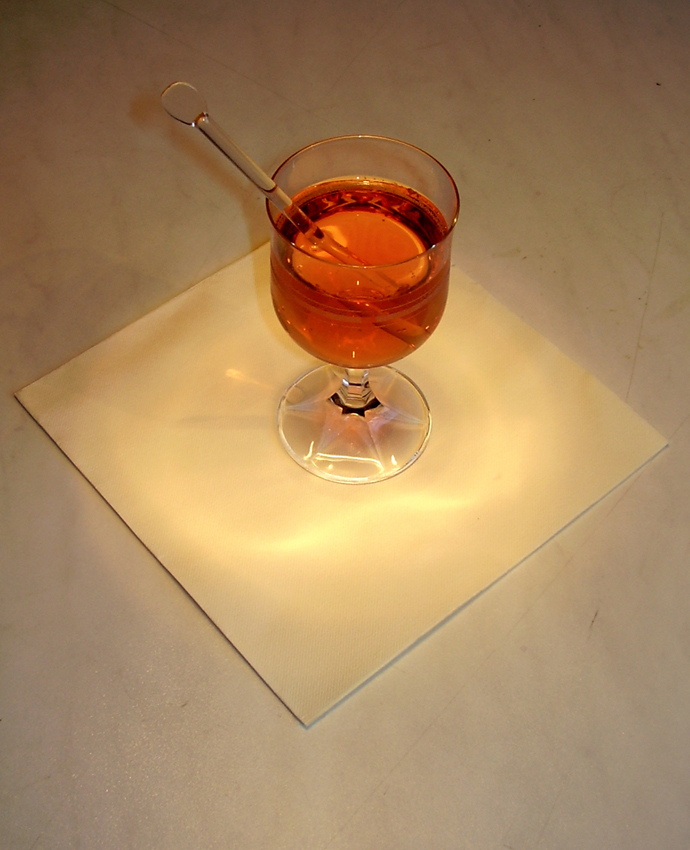
“Espírito da Caldeira” label grape and quince spirits

After the white wine is fermented, the remnant pomace of moscatel grapes is distilled to produce a pomace brandy : destilado de uva (label “Espírito da Caldeira”), that is bright and clear. The spirit's strength enables the drinker to taste, and feel on his/her palate, the flavor of Moscatel grapes. The after taste is smooth and has a hint of sweetness to balance the spirit's high alcohol content (45%).

== Spirits of fruits or herbs ==
The quince spirit, destilado de marmelo, is produced from well-ripened quince fruit. Odors include that of the sweet, tart fruits of the caldera (like quince, apples, and grapes), flavors which combine nicely with the strength of the spirit's alcohol. The finish of the destilado de marmelo is smooth, gentle, and sweet.

The destilado com ervas digestivas, or spirit with herbs, has the unique taste, aroma, potency, and medicinal properties to help with post-dinner digestion. The spirit is a combination of herbs that have been used as a traditional medicine by the people of Chã for generations.

== Sources ==
Else, David; Newton, Alex; Williams, Jeff; Fitzpatrick, Mary; and Roddis, Miles, 1999, West Africa. Lonely Planet: Hawthorn, Australia, 944 p.

Irwin, Aisling; and Wilson, Colum, 2001, Cape Verde Islands. Bradt: Bucks, UK, 278 p.

MAAP de Cabo Verde, and Deutsche Gesellschaft für Technische Zusammenarbeit (GTZ) GmbH, 2003, “Endemic Plants and Indigenous Trees of the Cape Verde Islands.” Praia: UNDP, 35 p.

MAAP de Cabo Verde Pamphlet. “Integrated Participatory Ecosystem Management In and Around Protected Areas,” 2004.

“Spirits of Chã das Caldeiras,” Cospe Pamphlet, 2006.

“Wines of Chã das Caldeiras,” Cospe Pamphlet, 1999.
