= Cyprinia =

Scientific classification
- Kingdom: Plantae
- Clade: Tracheophytes
- Clade: Angiosperms
- Clade: Eudicots
- Clade: Asterids
- Order: Gentianales
- Family: Apocynaceae
- Genus: Cyprinia; Juss.
- Species: C. gracilis

Binomial name
- Cyprinia gracilis (Boiss.) Browicz

Synonyms
- Cyprinia gracilis (Boiss.) Browicz; Periploca laevigata Bal. ex Boiss.

Monotypic genus of plants

Cyprinia is a monotypic genus of plants in the family Apocynaceae. It contains a single species, Cyprinia gracilis, a climber with yellow flowers.

The genus is closely related to Periploca and is treated as a synonym of that genus by some sources. It is native to Cyprus and a few localities in southern Turkey.
