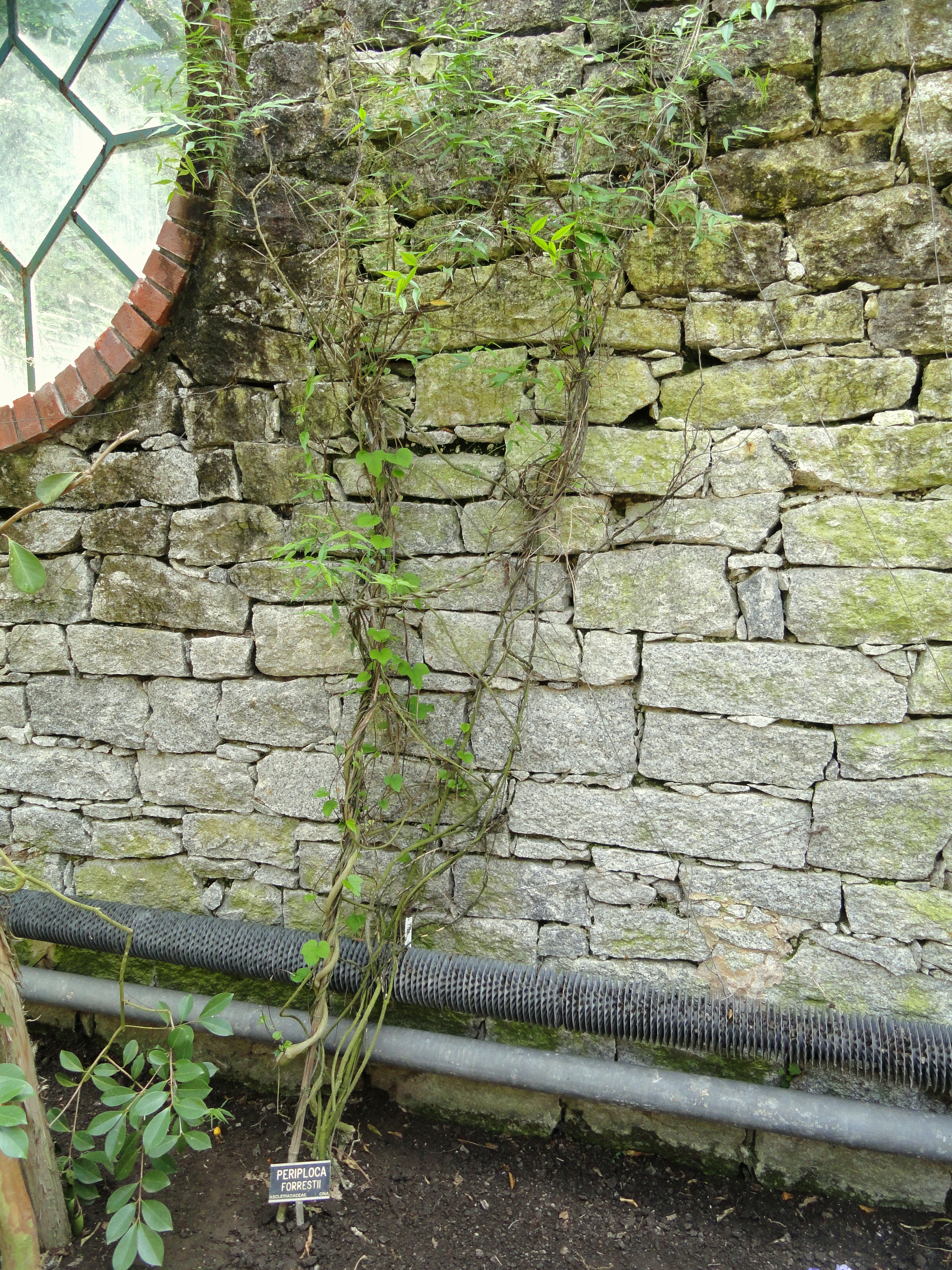
- Periploca forrestii

Scientific classification
- Kingdom: Plantae
- Clade: Tracheophytes
- Clade: Angiosperms
- Clade: Eudicots
- Clade: Asterids
- Order: Gentianales
- Family: Apocynaceae
- Subfamily: Periplocoideae
- Genus: Periploca; Tourn. ex. L.

= Periploca (plant) =

Genus of vines

Periploca is a genus of plants in the family Apocynaceae, first described for modern science by Linnaeus in 1753. It is native to Europe, Asia, and Africa.

Species

1. Periploca angustifolia Labill. - North Africa, South Europe (Kriti, Sicilia, Spain)
2. Periploca aphylla Decne. - Middle East from Sinai to Pakistan
3. Periploca calophylla (Wight) Falc. - S China, Nepal, Bhutan, Assam, E Himalayas, Vietnam
4. Periploca chevalieri Browicz - Cape Verde Islands
5. Periploca chrysantha D.S. Yao, X.D. Chen & J.W. Ren - Gansu Province in China
6. Periploca floribunda Tsiang - Yunnan, Vietnam
7. Periploca forrestii Schltr. - Guangxi, Guizhou, Qinghai, Sichuan, Tibet, Yunnan, India, Kashmir, Myanmar, Nepal
8. Periploca gracilis Boiss. - Cyprus, Turkey
9. Periploca graeca L. - Mediterranean
10. Periploca hydaspidis Falc. - Kashmir
11. Periploca laevigata Aiton - Canary Islands, Savage Islands
12. Periploca linearifolia Quart.-Dill. & A. Rich - Ethiopia
13. Periploca purpurea Kerr - Thailand
14. Periploca sepium Bunge - widespread across much of China
15. Periploca somaliensis Browicz - Saudi Arabia, Yemen, Somalia
16. Periploca tsiangii D. Fang & H.Z. Ling - Guangxi Province in China
17. Periploca visciformis (Vatke) K. Schum. - Somalia

formerly included

1. P. africana, syn of Cynanchum africanum
2. P. albicans, syn of Streptocaulon albicans
3. P. alboflavescens, syn of Parsonsia alboflavescens
4. P. apiculata, syn of Tacazzea apiculata
5. P. arborea, syn of Wrightia arborea
6. P. astacus, syn of Trachelospermum axillare
7. P. bifida, syn of Cryptolepis bifida
8. P. calophylla (Baill.) Roberty 1953 not (Wight) Falc. 1841, syn of Omphalogonus calophyllus
9. P. capsularis, syn of Parsonsia capsularis
10. P. chinensis, syn of Cryptolepis sinensis
11. P. cochinchinensis, syn of Calotropis gigantea
12. P. cordata, syn of Hemidesmus cordatus
13. P. divaricata, syn of Strophanthus divaricatus
14. P. emetica, syn of Secamone emetica
15. P. esculenta, syn of Oxystelma esculentum
16. P. gracilis, syn of Cyprinia gracilis
17. P. indica, syn of Hemidesmus indicus
18. P. mauritiana, syn of Camptocarpus mauritianus
19. P. palvallii, syn of Ichnocarpus frutescens
20. P. parviflora, syn of Streptocaulon parviflorum
21. P. pyrotechnica, syn of Leptadenia pyrotechnica
22. P. secamone, syn of Sarcostemma secamone
23. P. sylvestris, syn of Gymnema sylvestre
24. P. tunicata, syn of Cynanchum tunicatum
25. P. umbellata, syn of Pinochia corymbosa
26. P. virgata, syn of Orthosia virgata

== See also ==
- Cyprinia, Cyprinia gracilis synonym of Periploca gracilis.
