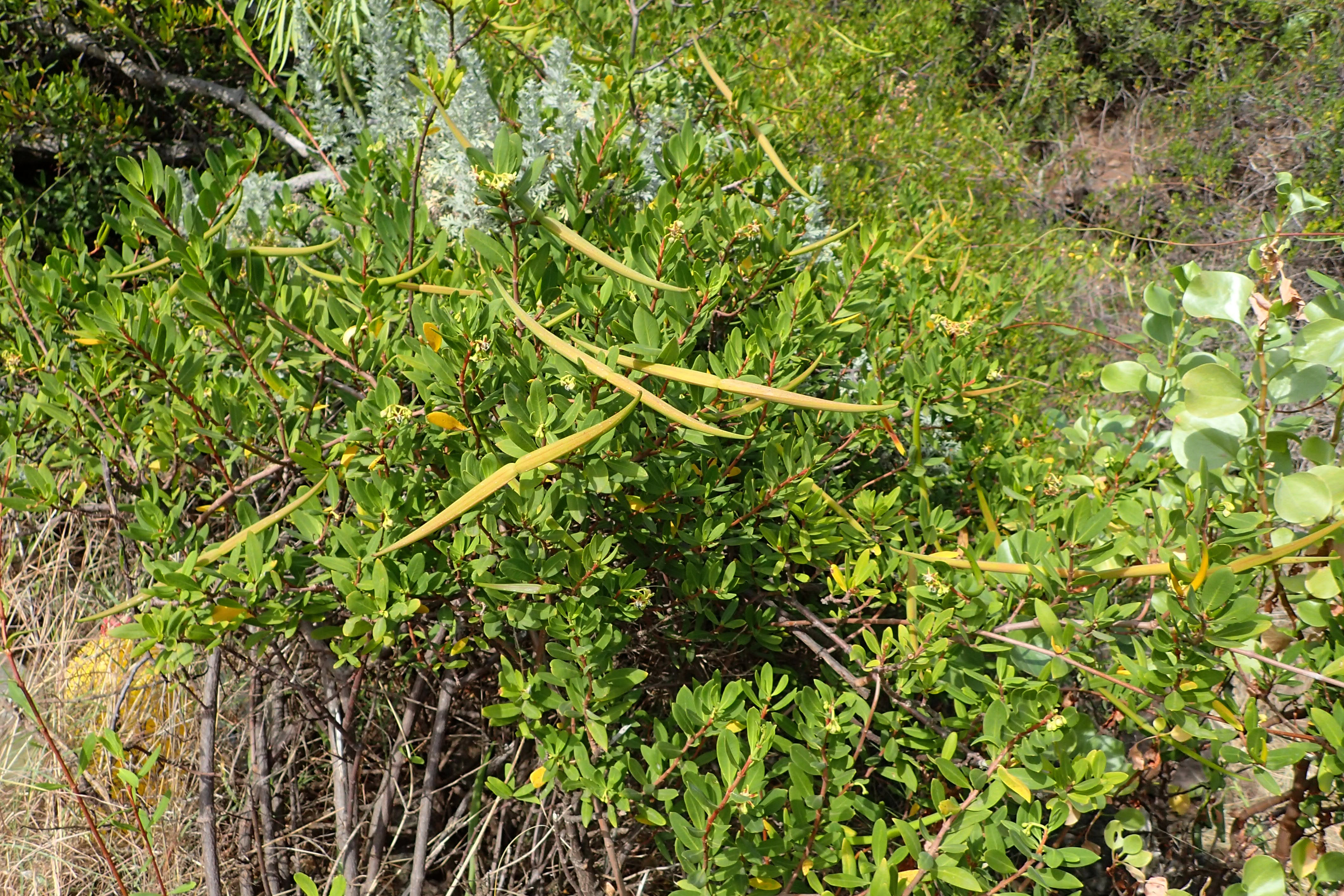
- In habitat, Los Felipes, Tenerife

Scientific classification
- Kingdom: Plantae
- Clade: Tracheophytes
- Clade: Angiosperms
- Clade: Eudicots
- Clade: Asterids
- Order: Gentianales
- Family: Apocynaceae
- Genus: Periploca
- Species: P. laevigata

Binomial name
- Periploca laevigata Aiton

Synonyms
- Periploca oleifolia Salisb.; Periploca punicifolia Cav.

= Periploca laevigata =

Species of flowering plant

Periploca laevigata is a species of flowering plant in the family Apocynaceae, native to the Canary Islands, the Savage Islands and Cape Verde.

The species was described by William Aiton and was published in Hortus Kewensis in 1789. Its Spanish names are cornicabra or cornica. "Cornicabra" means goat horn.

== Subspecies ==
- Periploca laevigata subsp. chevalieri (Browicz) G. Kunkel - found in Cape Verde

== Description ==
The plant is a shrub and can grow up to 2 metres. Its leaves are lanceolate or. Its stems grow up to 15 cm and is about 1 cm thick. Its petals are oblong at the end and has a yellowish-green colour at its ends, inside, it is brown. Its seed pods are long and pointed-like at the ends.

Its chromosome number is 2n = 22.

== Distribution ==
The plant is native to the Canary Islands, the Savage Islands and Cape Verde, reaching its northernmost distribution in Sicily, in the Aegadian Islands. In Cape Verde they occur on the islands of Brava, Fogo, Santa Luzia, Santiago, Santo Antão and São Nicolau. Some authors put the Cape Verdean subspecies as separate (as Periploca chevalieri, Browicz).

== Gallery ==
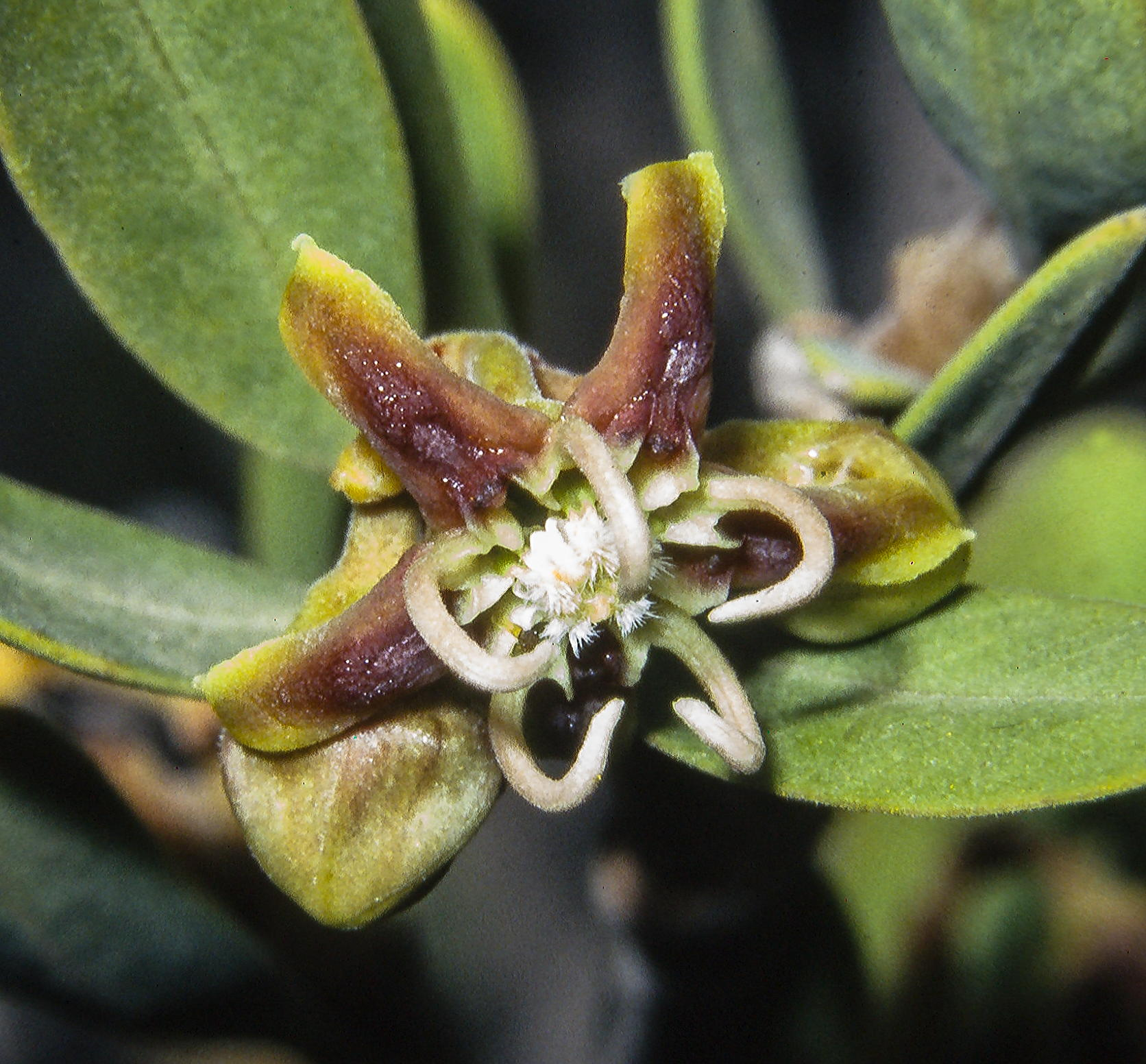
Flower

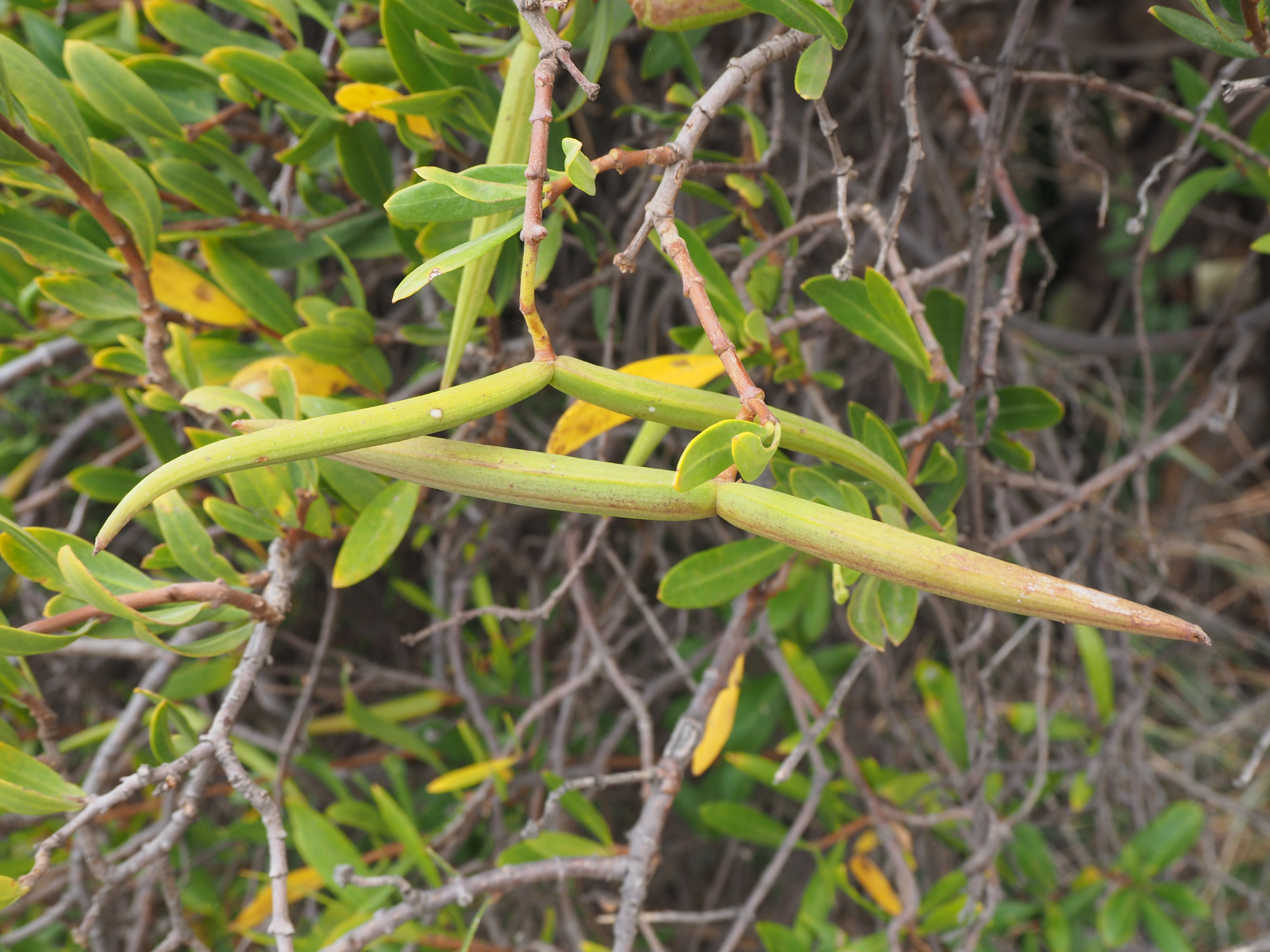
Seed pods

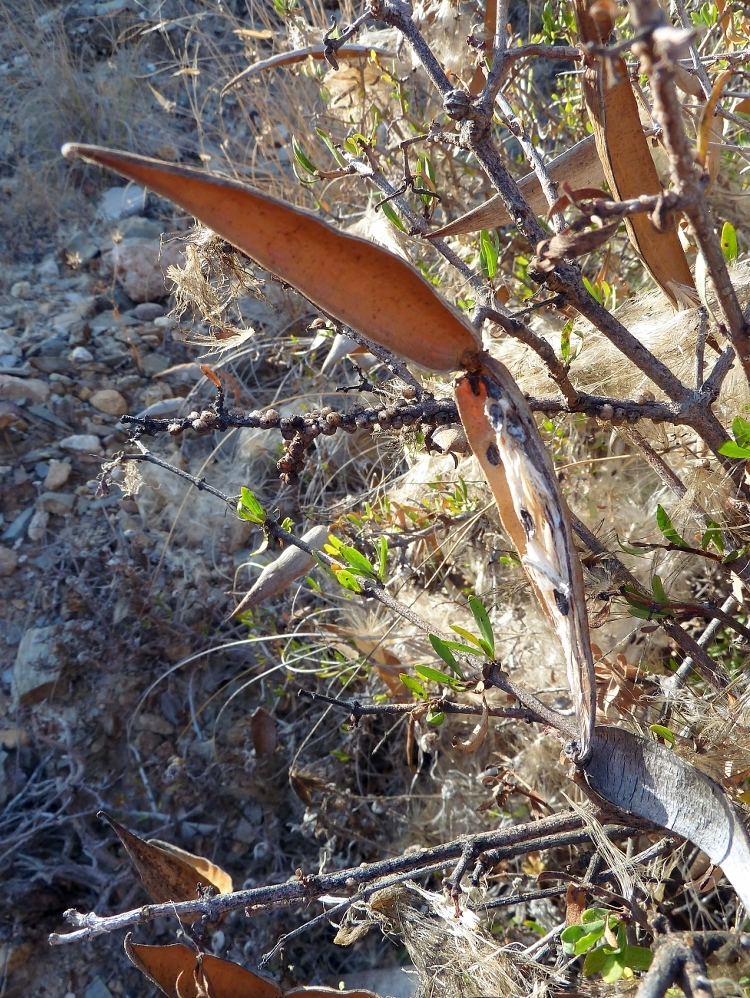
Seeds
