= Pico do Fogo =

Mountain peak in Cape Verde

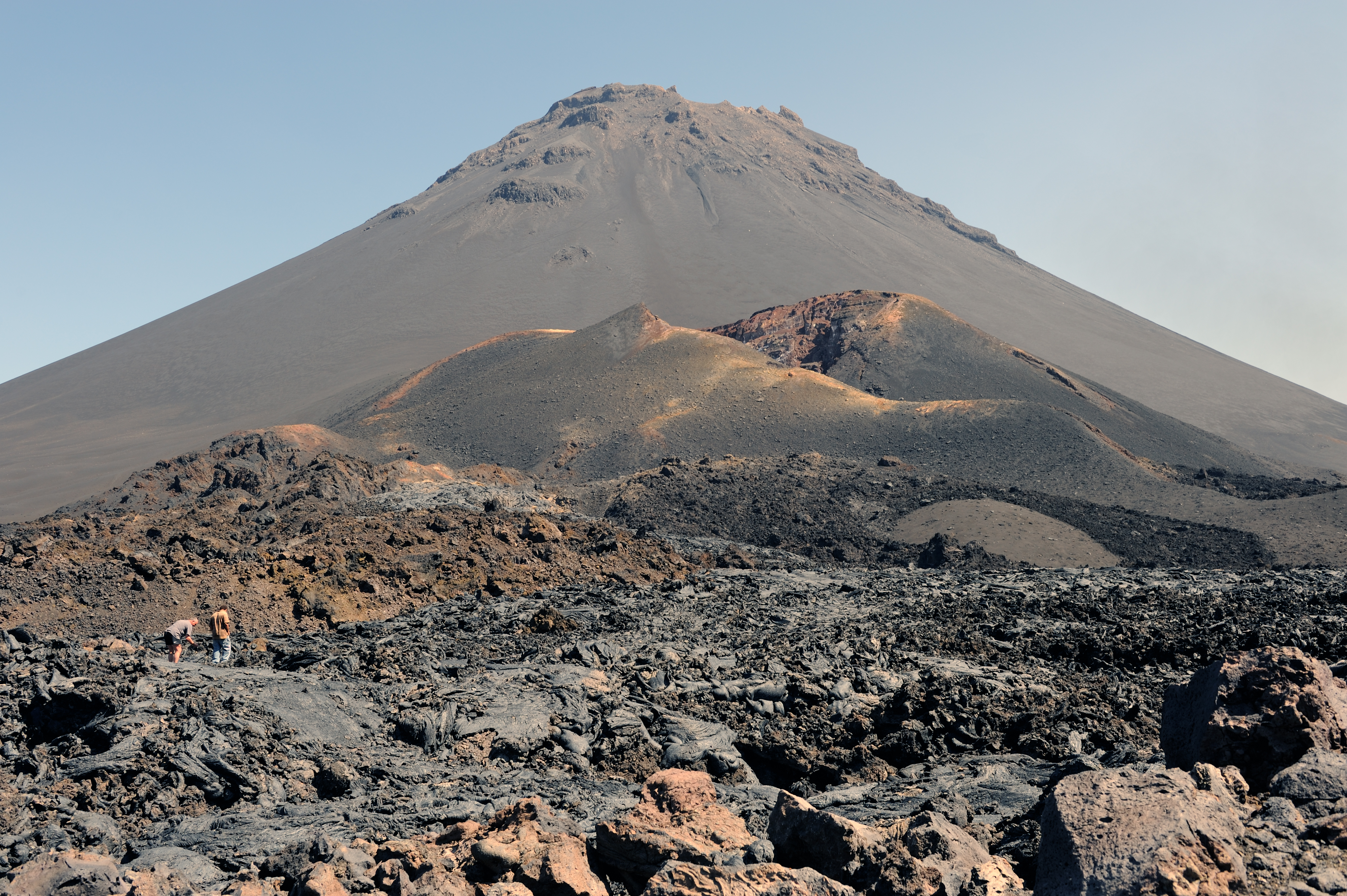

Highest point
- Elevation: 2,829 m (9,281 ft)
- Prominence: 2,829 m (9,281 ft); Ranked 120th
- Listing: Country high point Ultra; List of mountains in Cape Verde
- Coordinates: 14°57′00″N 24°20′30″W

Geography
- Location within Cape Verde
- Location: Fogo, Cape Verde

Geology
- Mountain type: Sommian-Stratovolcano
- Last eruption: November 2014 to February 2015

Pico do Fogo (Portuguese: [ˈpiku du ˈfoɡu]; lit. 'Peak of Fire') is an active stratovolcano located on the island of Fogo, Cape Verde, rising to 2,829 metres (9,281 ft) above sea level. The main cone last erupted in 1680, causing mass emigration from the island. A subsidiary vent erupted in 1995. The only deadly eruption was in 1847 when earthquakes killed several people.

Fogo, which means "fire" in Portuguese, is a hotspot volcanic island. Its most recent eruptions occurred in 1951, 1995 and 2014. It is the youngest and most active volcano in the Cape Verde Islands, a short chain of volcanic islands that generally are younger at the western end, formed as the African Plate moved towards the east over the hotspot.

Fogo consists of a single volcano, so the island is nearly round and about 25 kilometers (16 mi) in diameter. The large summit caldera (about 10 kilometers in the north–south direction and 7 kilometers in the east–west direction) is not located in the center of the island, but rather towards its northeastern corner. The caldera is bounded by steep near-vertical fault scarps on the north, west, and south sides but is breached to the east where lava can flow to the coast. North-northeast-trending eruptive fissures opened along the western flank of Pico, which formed inside the caldera between about 1500 and 1760. The last eruption from the top was in 1769. The current topography of Fogo, with the caldera open to the sea on the east side, results from the sliding of the east flank of the volcano towards the ocean.

The mountain's slopes are used to grow coffee, while its lava is used as building material. Near its peak is a caldera and a small village, Chã das Caldeiras, is inside this caldera. The crater rim, which reaches 2,700 m elevation, is known as Bordeira.

== 73,000 years ago ==
The eastern side of Fogo collapsed into the ocean 73,000 years ago, creating a tsunami 170 meters high which struck the nearby island of Santiago. The tsunami was dated by isotope analysis of boulders deposited on Santiago.

== 1680 AD eruption ==
In 1680 AD, a major summit eruption of Pico do Fogo produced large ash falls over the whole island rendering agricultural lands temporarily unusable and triggering mass emigration from the island, to the neighboring island of Brava in particular.

== 1995 eruption ==
The 1995 eruption began on the night of 2–3 April, covering the island with a cloud of ash. Residents were evacuated from Chã das Caldeiras, as their homes were destroyed.

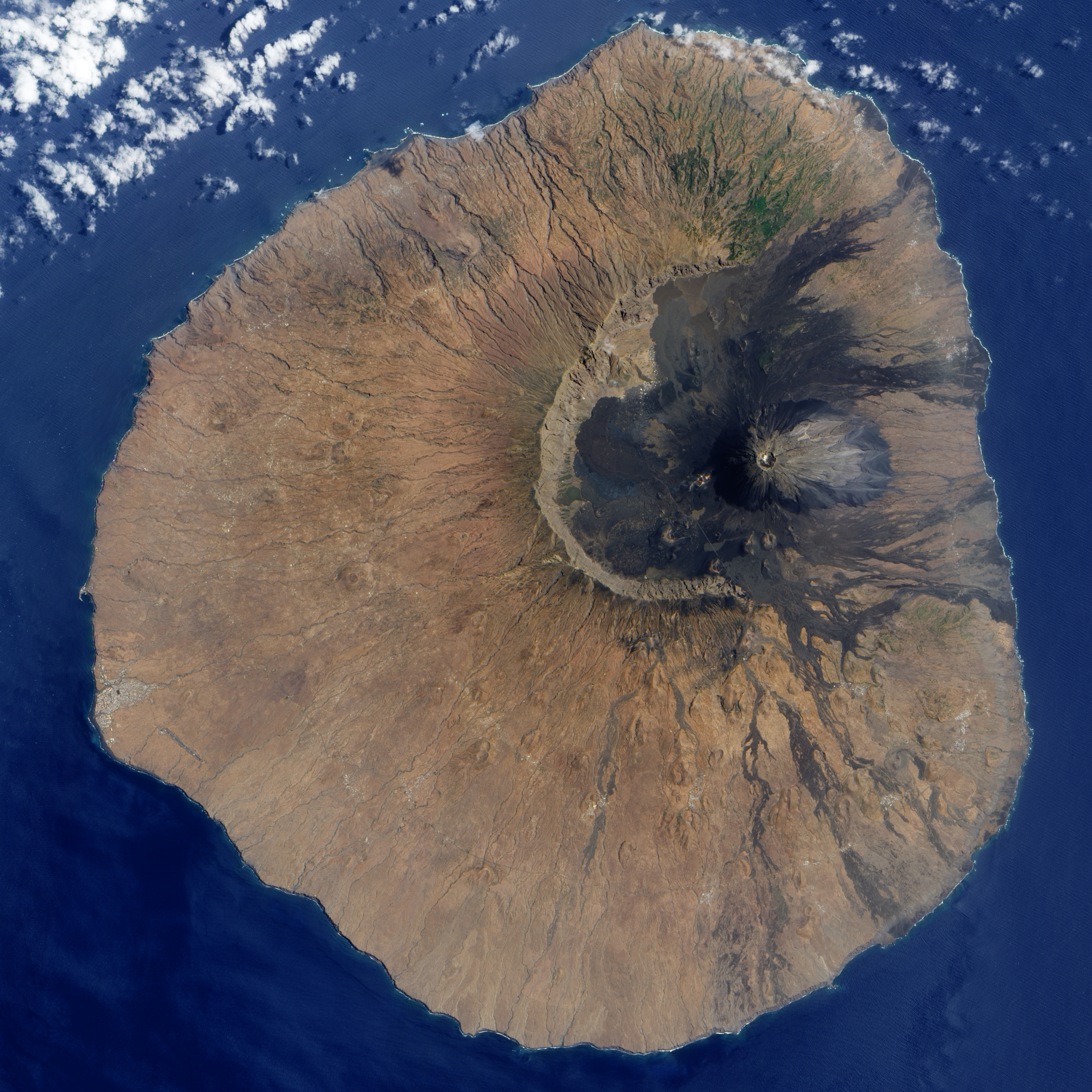
Satellite image of Fogo.

Residents reported that the eruption was preceded by small earthquakes which began about six days prior to the first eruption of lava. These earthquakes increased in magnitude and frequency through April 2, and a particularly strong one was reported at about 8 p.m., four hours before the eruption apparently began. Just after midnight, fissures opened on the flank of Pico. One resident said it looked as if the cone had "been cut by a knife." The eruption began with Strombolian activity, quickly followed by a 'curtain-of-fire' lava fountain that fed a flow which cut off the road to the village of Portela by 2 a.m. The 1,300 people living inside the caldera fled during the night to the safety of villages on the north coast. No one was killed, but about 20 people required medical attention.

During the day on April 3, the island was engulfed by a thick cloud of dark ash that reached 2.5 to 5 kilometers high. The initial flows were pahoehoe lava, although their extent was apparently small. The violent eruption produced lava bombs up to 4 meters across that were ejected as far as 500 meters from the vents. On April 4, lava fountains reached 400 meters high beneath a cloud of ash about 2 kilometers high. A new scoria cone formed that was open to the southwest and fed a growing lava flow. On April 5, the new lava flow reached the western caldera wall and destroyed about five houses and the main water reservoir. During these first few days, civil authorities evacuated about 3,000 people.

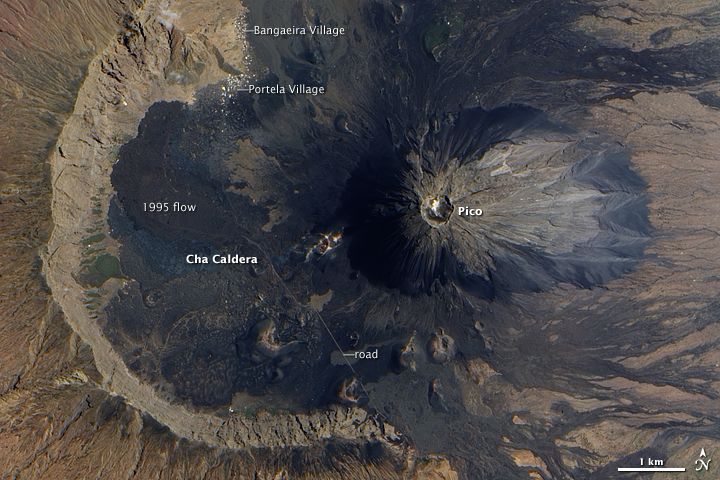
Chã das Caldeiras and main ash cone, Fogo, 2009

The eruption became steadier after the first few days, and moderate, Hawaiian-style lava fountains about 100–120 meters high built a spatter cone more than 140 meters high. The flows were lava, and flowed towards the west to the caldera wall, then turned north. These flows advanced episodically as pressure built from ponding and thickening of the flows. On April 13, a second lava flow began to cover an earlier, stagnant lava flow, and was almost entirely on top of the earlier flow until April 15, when it spread out and destroyed another home. Cinder fell as far as two kilometers south of the vents on April 15. By the 17th, the flow had advanced to within 420 meters of the nearest house in the village of Portela.

On April 18, a portable seismometer began to record much stronger volcanic tremors that indicated a change in eruptive style from lava fountains back to Strombolian activity. Spatter was discharged every 3–8 seconds with loud gas bursts. In addition, the eruptive rate increased and the upper 300 meters of the channel was largely pahoehoe lava. The eruption rates, estimated from the dimensions and flow rates in the channel, were between 4 and 8.5 million cubic meters per day.

During the night of April 18, a series of large, explosive bursts occurred that may have followed collapse of parts of the cone into the vents and subsequent explosive clearing of the debris. By morning, the activity had returned to lava fountaining, and the seismic record was much quieter. The lava flows continued to thicken, and lava ponded along the central channel.

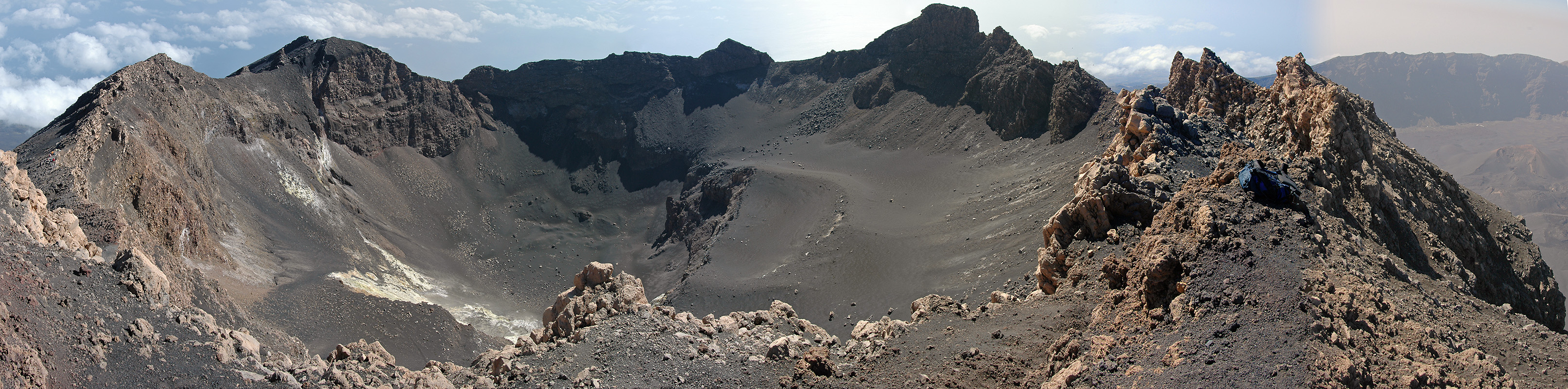
Pico do Fogo (crater).

== 2014-15 eruption ==
The Fogo volcano returned to activity in 2014, having started erupting shortly after 10 a.m. on Sunday, 23 November 2014. There had been a few days of heightened seismic activity, but it worsened beginning at 8 p.m. on Saturday night.

The population of Chã das Caldeiras, totaling around 1,000 inhabitants, spent the night outside their homes due to the strong earthquakes, and started being evacuated when the eruption began. As in 1995, some people initially refused to abandon their homes, but eventually heeded the authorities' instructions.

Bruno Faria, a Cape Verdean vulcanologist, said the intensity of the eruption surpassed that of the 1995 eruption, and approached that of the 1951 eruption, one of the strongest ever recorded on the island. The eruption gained in intensity after 23 November 2014. The village of Portela in the Chã das Caldeiras was covered by a lava stream which completely destroyed the housing stock.

After 77 days of activity, the eruption stopped on 8 February 2015. 75% of the buildings in Portela, Bangaeira and Ilhéu de Losna, sections of Chã das Caldeiras, had been destroyed. Most of these villages had been covered by lava. Geographer Christophe Neff wrote in his blog, after having been in Chã das Caldeiras in November 2017, that the reconstruction of the habitations in the Chã was progressing, and that some hotels were rebuilt and open for travelers.

== Geology ==
Pico do Fogo consists of basanite, tephrite, phonotephrite, clinopyroxene, amphibole, magnetite, olivine, melilite and leucite. The main magma chamber is about 16–24 km deep, into the ocean crust and 10–12 km in the bottom of the crust.

== Depictions ==
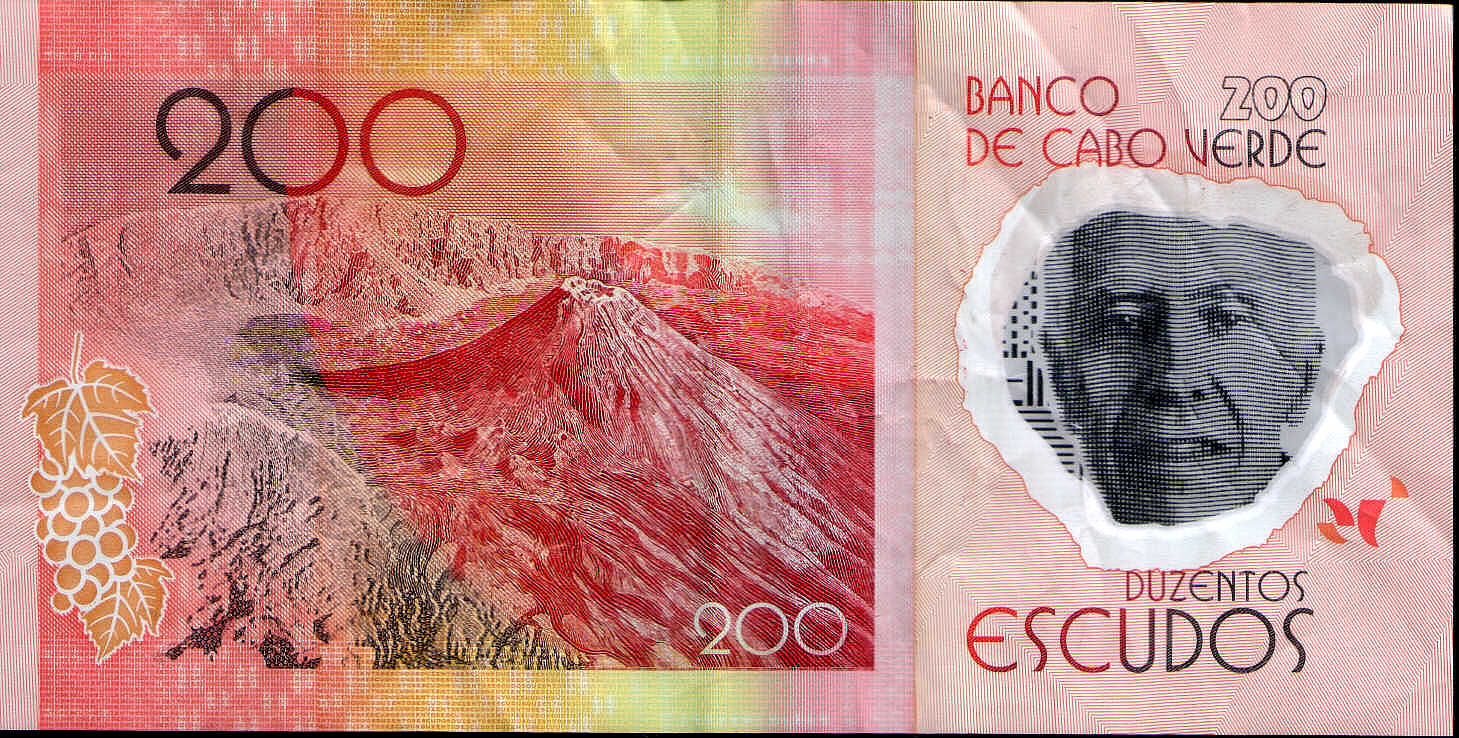
Pico do Fogo along with Henrique Teixeira da Sousa in a Capeverdean $200 escudo note

Since 2014, the peak along with the surrounding caldera were featured in a Capeverdean $200 escudo note. On the bottom left is the wine grape which is grown in the area and on the right Henrique Teixeira de Sousa, a native of the island, birthplace of an area that includes the peak.

== See also ==
- Teide – another stratovolcano that has formed in a caldera of an oceanic island
