= Monte Graciosa =

Mountain in Cape Verde

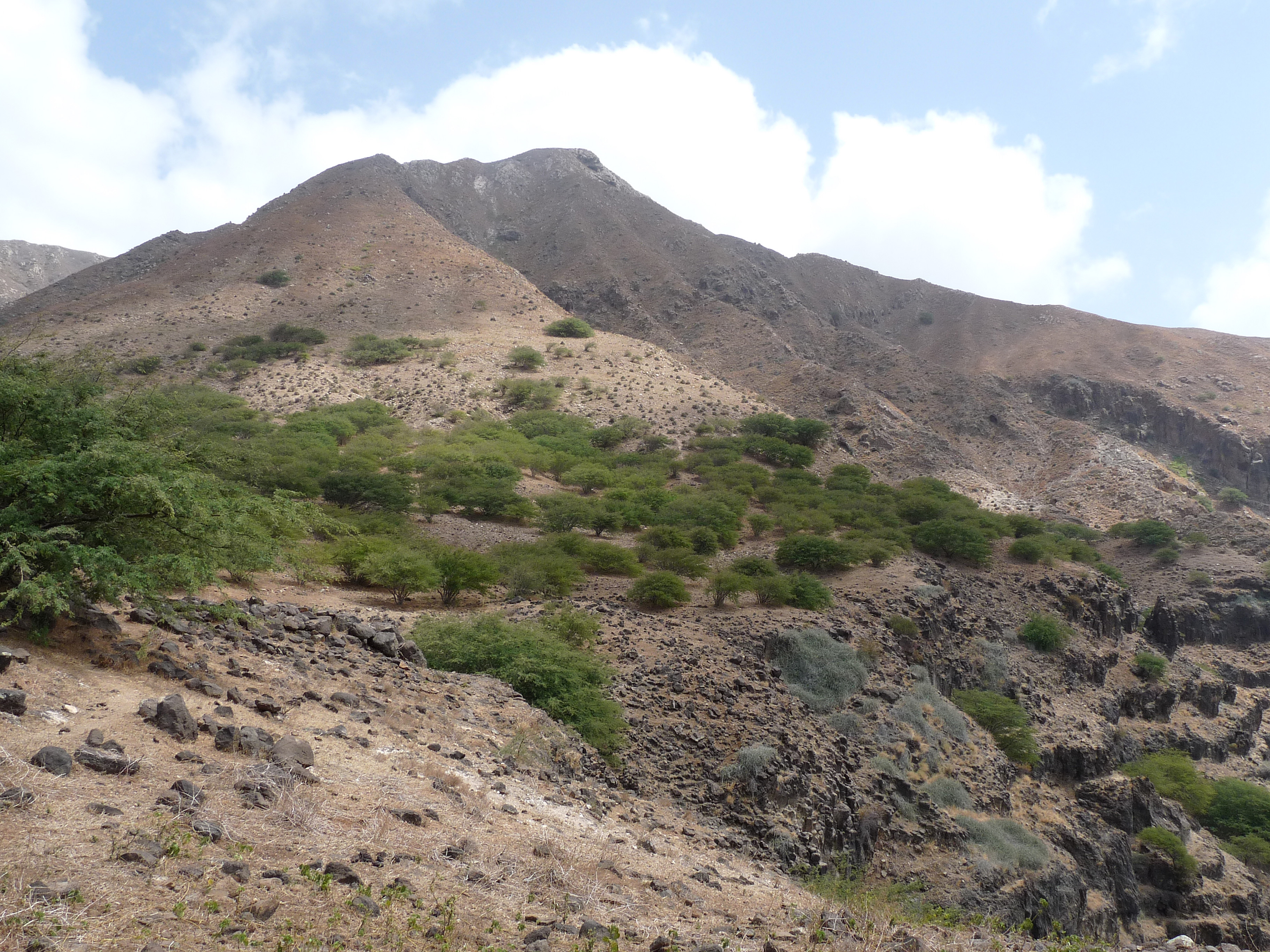
- Monte Graciosa

Highest point
- Elevation: 643 m (2,110 ft)
- Listing: List of mountains in Cape Verde
- Coordinates: 15°17′57″N 23°44′56″W

Geography
- Location within Cape Verde
- Location: northern Santiago

Monte Graciosa (Portuguese meaning “gracious mountain”) is a mountain in the northern part of the island of Santiago in Cape Verde. It lies 2.5 km north of the town of Tarrafal, overlooking the Baía de Tarrafal. Its elevation is 643 m. Towards the west it ends in the headland of Ponta Preta. It is part of a larger proposed natural park. The mountain is of volcanic origin, composed of phonolite and rich in feldspar and olivine.

Several endemic plants grow on the mountain, notably Campylanthus glaber ssp. glaber, Euphorbia tuckeyana, Kickxia webbiana (agrião de rocha), Kickxia dichondrifolia, Nauplius daltonii ssp. daltonii, Paronychia illecebroides, Cynanchum daltonii and Macaronesian ironwood (Sideroxylon marginatum).

== See also ==
- List of mountains in Cape Verde

== Gallery ==
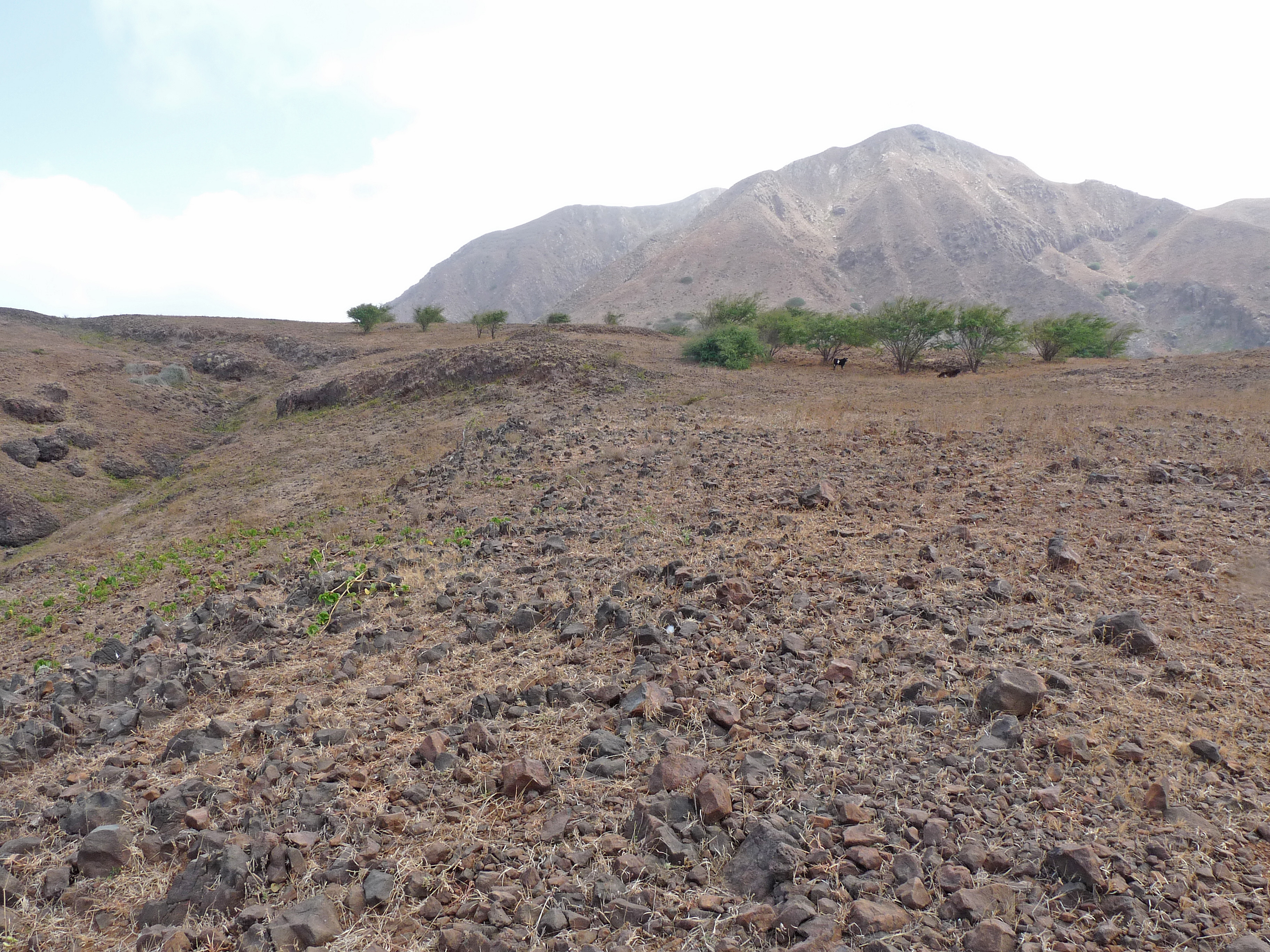
Plateau near the ocean

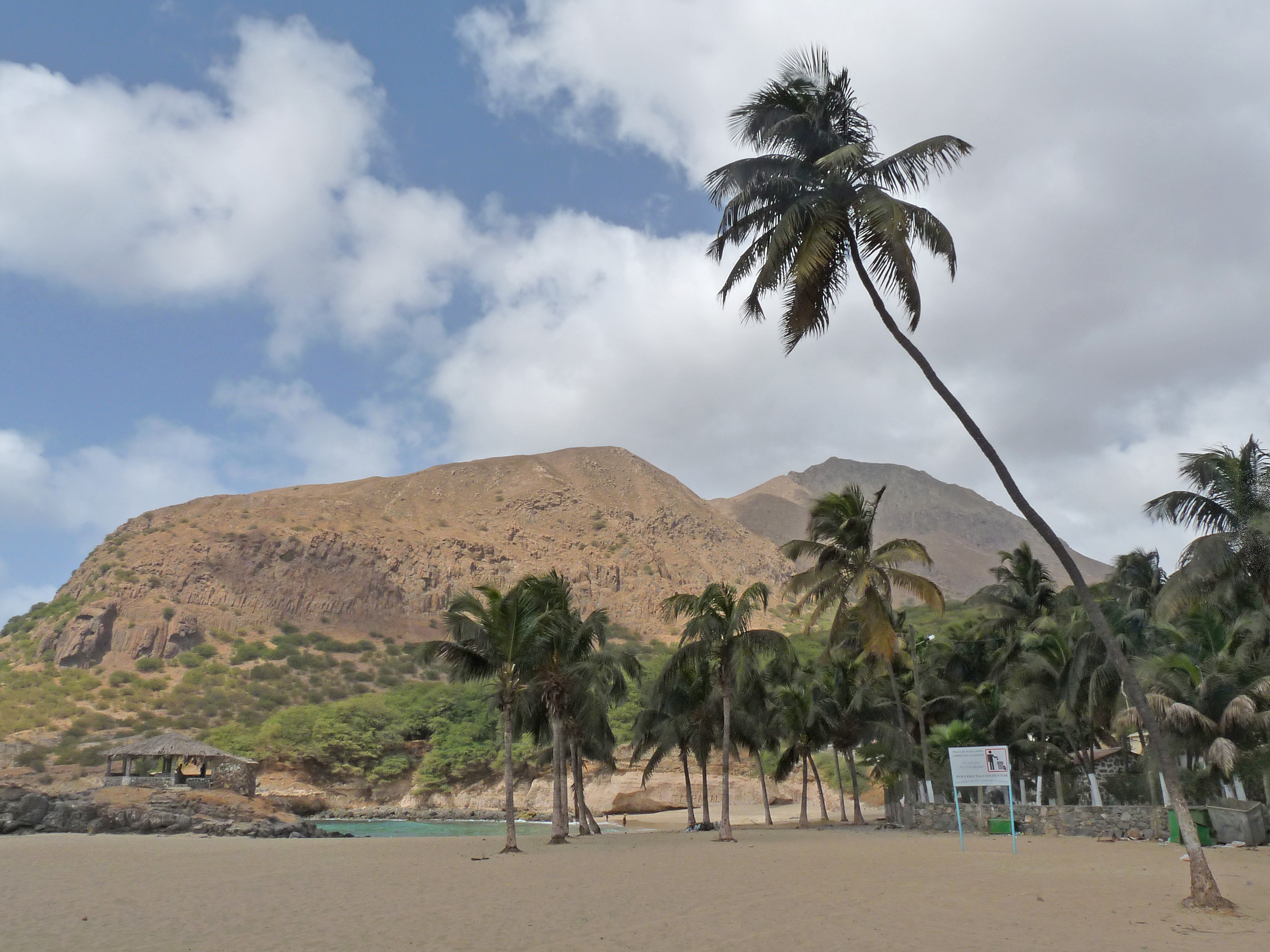
Monte Graciosa seen from Tarrafal Beach

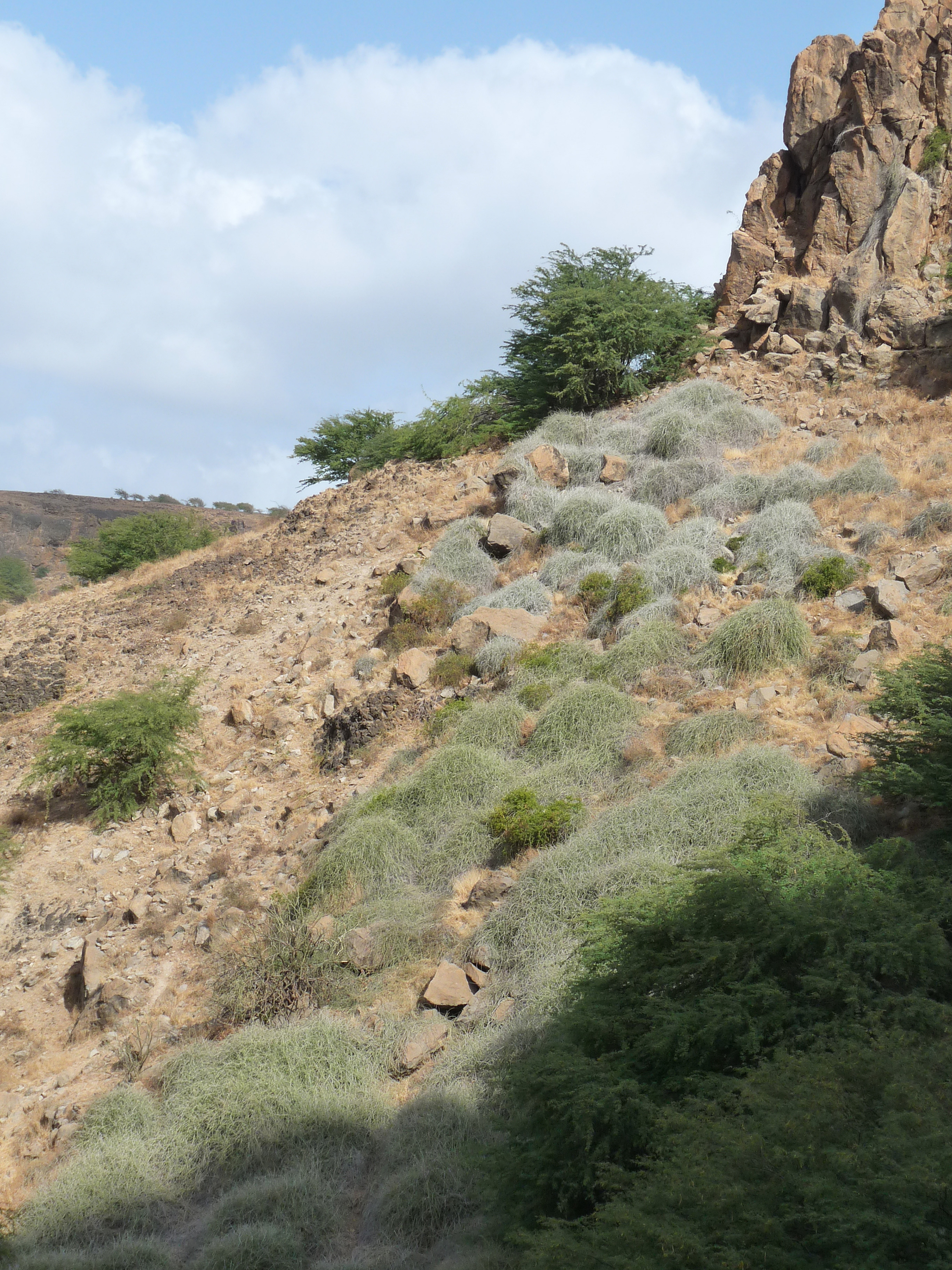
Cynanchum daltonii, an endemic plant of Cape Verde
