= Ponta Preta =

Ponta Preta (Portuguese meaning "black point") may refer to several headlands in Cape Verde:

- Ponta Preta (Maio), in the southwest of the island of Maio
- Ponta Preta (Northern Sal), in the northwest of the island of Sal
- Ponta Preta (Southern Sal), in the southwest of the island of Sal
- Ponta Preta (Santiago), in the northwest of the island of Santiago
- Ponta Preta Lighthouse, on Santiago
