= Tarrafal =

Tarrafal may refer to several locations in Cape Verde:

- Tarrafal, Cape Verde, a town on the island of Santiago
- Tarrafal, Cape Verde (municipality), a municipality on the island of Santiago
- Tarrafal de São Nicolau, Cape Verde, a town on the island of São Nicolau
- Tarrafal de São Nicolau (municipality), a municipality on the island of São Nicolau
- Tarrafal de Monte Trigo, a village on the island of Santo Antão
- Baía de Tarrafal, a bay west of the Town of Tarrafal in the island of Santiago
- Tarrafal camp, a former prison camp in Cape Verde
