= K. elegans =

K. elegans may refer to:

- Kerriodoxa elegans, a palm species
- Klebsormidium elegans, a filamentous charophyte alga species
- Koelreuteria elegans, the Chinese rain tree, a deciduous tree species native to Taiwan and southern China

== Synonyms ==
- Kickxia elegans, a synonym for Nanorrhinum elegans, a cancerwort flower species found in Cape Verde
