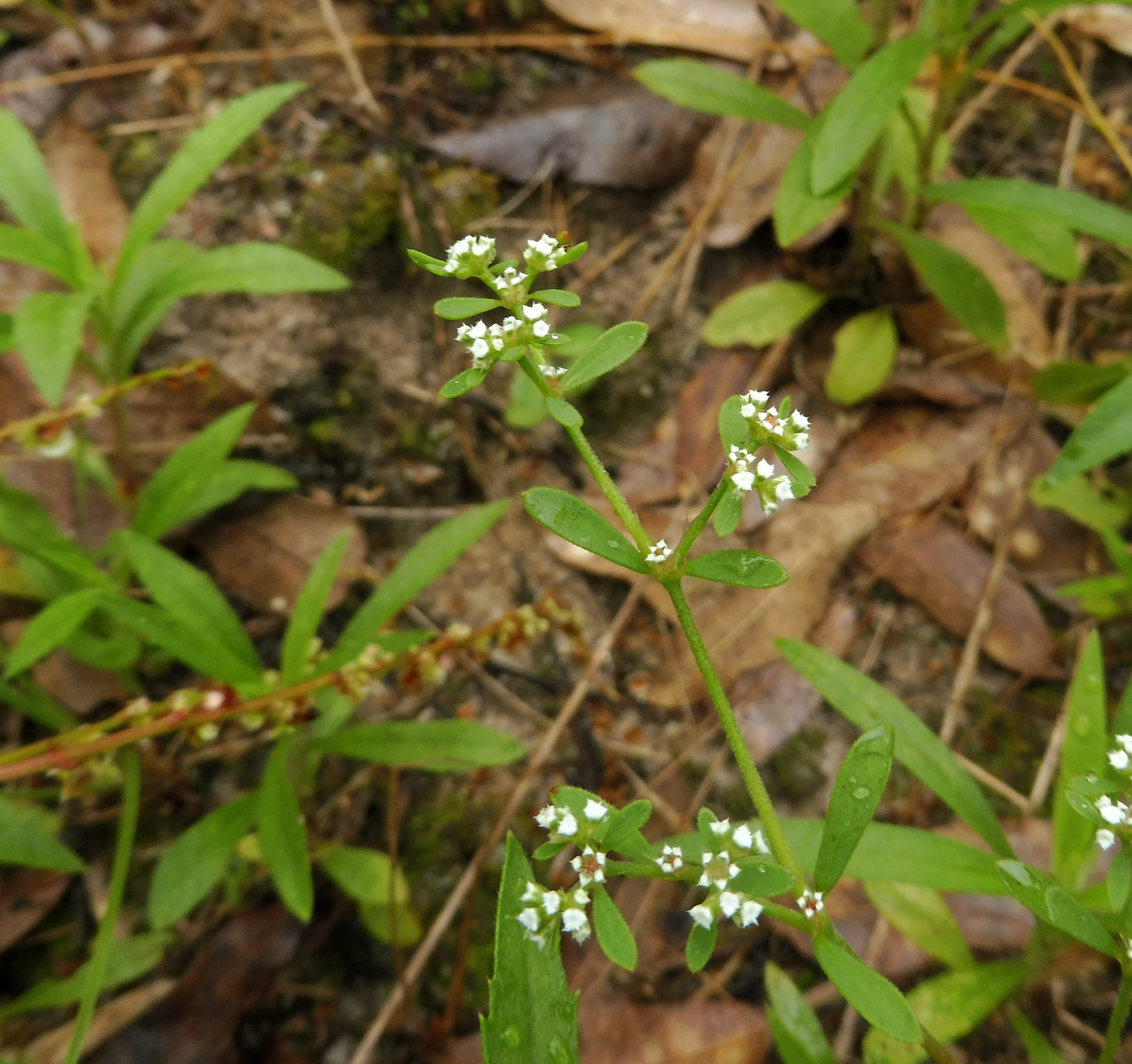

Scientific classification
- Kingdom: Plantae
- Clade: Tracheophytes
- Clade: Angiosperms
- Clade: Eudicots
- Order: Caryophyllales
- Family: Caryophyllaceae
- Genus: Paronychia
- Species: P. drummondii

Binomial name
- Paronychia drummondii Torr. & A.Gray

= Paronychia drummondii =

Species of flowering plant

Paronychia drummondii, commonly called Drummond's nailwort, is a species of flowering plant in the family Caryophyllaceae. It is native to the United States where it is restricted to the South Central region in the states of Louisiana, Oklahoma, and Texas. Its natural habitat is in sandy woodlands and openings.

Paronychia drummondii is an erect annual or biennial. Its leaves are oblong to linear-lanceolate. A key characteristic is the abundance of uniform, hooked hairs at the base of the calyx. Flowers are produced from late spring to fall.
