= Paronychia sessiliflora =

Conservation status
- Secure (NatureServe)

Scientific classification
- Kingdom: Plantae
- Clade: Tracheophytes
- Clade: Angiosperms
- Clade: Eudicots
- Order: Caryophyllales
- Family: Caryophyllaceae
- Genus: Paronychia
- Species: P. sessiliflora

Binomial name
- Paronychia sessiliflora Nutt.

Synonyms
- Paronychia sessiliflora var. brevispina A.Nelson; Queria sessiliflora Eaton

Species of flowering plant

Paronychia sessiliflora, the creeping nailwort, is a plant in the family Cayophyllaceae known from arid and semi arid environments in North America other common names include low nailwort.

== Description ==
Paronychia sessiliflora is a perennial mat-forming, woody herbaceous plant. Flowers are hidden among leaves in 3-6 flowered Cymes or solitary arrangement. Fruits are a utricle.

== Range ==
The plant grows from south-western Canada (Alberta, Saskatchewan) through the western United States from Montana to New Mexico, as well as east to Texas.

== Habitat ==
Paronychia sessiliflora can be found on dry, stony hillsides, summits, and sandstone mesas from elevations of 700 to 3100m.
