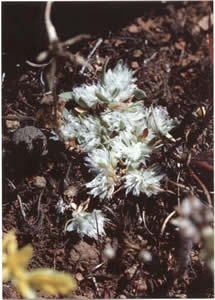

Scientific classification
- Kingdom: Plantae
- Clade: Tracheophytes
- Clade: Angiosperms
- Clade: Eudicots
- Order: Caryophyllales
- Family: Caryophyllaceae
- Genus: Paronychia
- Species: P. ahartii

Binomial name
- Paronychia ahartii Ertter

= Paronychia ahartii =

Species of flowering plant

Paronychia ahartii is a species of flowering plant in the family Caryophyllaceae known by the common name Ahart's nailwort. It is endemic to California, where it is known from three counties at the northern edge of the Sacramento Valley where it rises into the southern slopes of the Cascade Range. It is a plant of moist, rocky habitat, such as vernal pools. This is a petite plant producing a nearly invisible stem from a threadlike taproot. The plant is only about a centimeter wide and somewhat spherical in shape. It is a tiny patch of bristle-tipped green leaves a few millimeters in length with oval-shaped stipules. The single flower occurring in each leaf axil has no petals but white, rough-textured, awn-tipped sepals clustered around the leaves.
