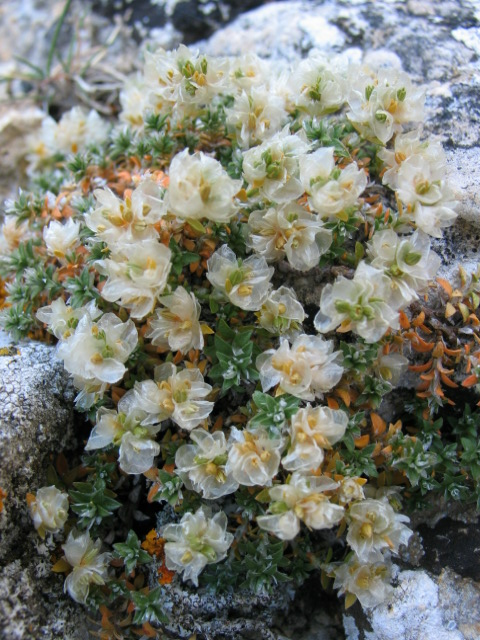

Scientific classification
- Kingdom: Plantae
- Clade: Tracheophytes
- Clade: Angiosperms
- Clade: Eudicots
- Order: Caryophyllales
- Family: Caryophyllaceae
- Genus: Paronychia
- Species: P. argentea

Binomial name
- Paronychia argentea Lam.

= Paronychia argentea =

Species of flowering plant

Paronychia argentea, commonly known as Algerian tea, is an herbaceous plant from the family Caryophyllaceae that grows in sandy areas, ways, abandoned fields and dry terrains.

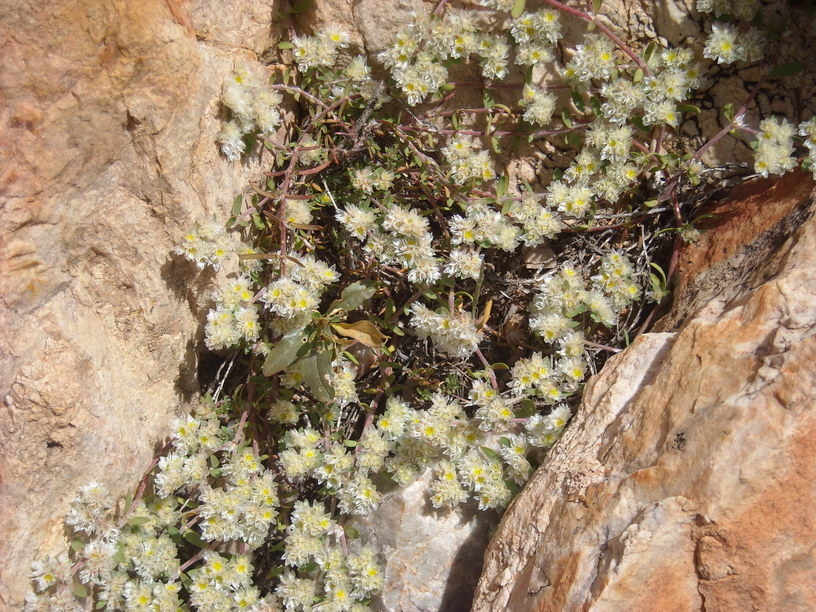
Sight of the plant in its habitat

== Description ==
It is an annual species with procumbent habits, which reaches 30 cm height. Similar to Paronychia capitata but with almost all glabrous leaves, a rigid and prominent sow, and calyx lobules with transparent margins.

The stem is glabrous or pubescent, with opposite, elliptical and mucronate leaves.

The flowers grow in lateral and terminal glomerulus. They are hermaphrodite, pentamerous and actinomorphic, accompanied with scaly silver bracts bigger that themselves. The fruit is an achene.

== Habitat and distribution ==
They can be encountered all around the Mediterranean Sea. It grows in abandoned or dry terrains, dunes and ditches, and flourishes from winter to summer.

== Uses ==
It is used stewed, as a diuretic and blood purifier, and as a plaster to cure wounds.

== Taxonomy ==
Paronychia argentea was described by Jean-Baptiste Lamarck and published in Flore Françoise 3: 230. 1778[1779].

Cytology

Paronychia argentea (Fam. Caryophyllaceae) infraspecific number of chromosomes and taxa: 2n=28

Synonymy

- Paronychia nitida Gaertn. 1791
- Paronychia mauritanica (Schult.) Rothm. & Q.J.P.Silva 1939
- Paronychia italica (Vill.) Schult. in Roem. & Schult. 1819
- Paronychia cuatrecasii Sennen 1929
- Paronychia carpetana Pau 1895
- Illecebrum mauritanicum Schult. in Roem. & Schult. 1819
- Illecebrum maritimum Vill. 1801
- Paronychia pubescens DC. in Lam. & DC. 1805
- Paronychia glomerata Moench 1794
- Chaetonychia paronychia (L.) Samp.
- Ferriera mediterranea Bubani
- Illecebrum argenteum Pourr.
- Illecebrum italicum Vill.
- Illecebrum narbonnense Vill.
- Illecebrum paronychia L.
- Plottzia paronychia (L.) Samp.
