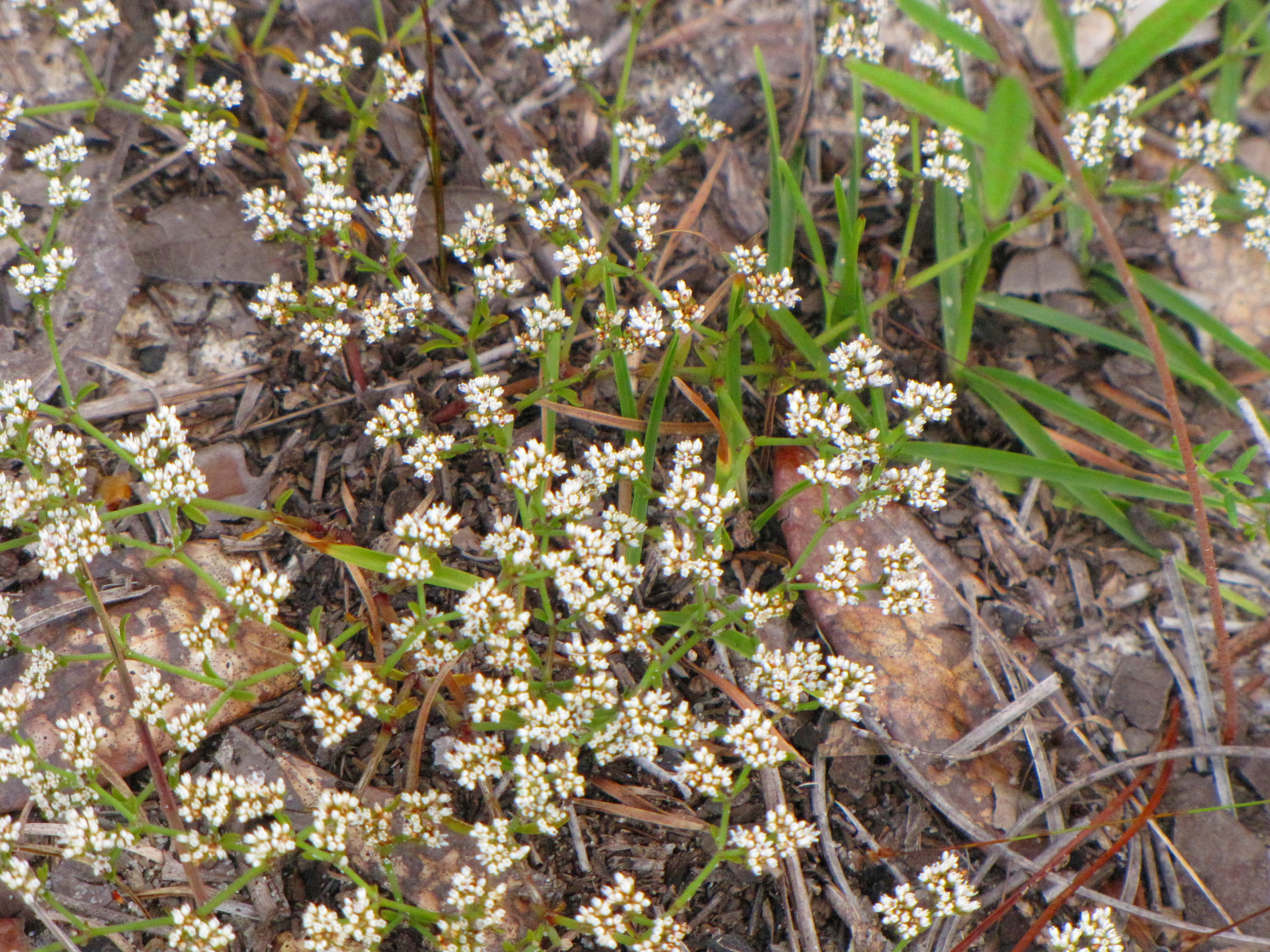

Conservation status
- Imperiled (NatureServe)

Scientific classification
- Kingdom: Plantae
- Clade: Tracheophytes
- Clade: Angiosperms
- Clade: Eudicots
- Order: Caryophyllales
- Family: Caryophyllaceae
- Genus: Paronychia
- Species: P. rugelii

Binomial name
- Paronychia rugelii (Chapm.) Shuttlew. ex Chapm.

Synonyms
- Forcipella rugelii (Chapm.) Small; Gibbesia rugelii (Chapm.) Small; Odontonychia interior Small; Paronychia rugelii var. interior (Small) Chaudhri; Siphonychia interior (Small) Core; Siphonychia rugelii Chapm.

= Paronychia rugelii =

Species of plant

Paronychia rugelii, common names Rugel's nailwort and sand-squares, is a plant native to the US states of Georgia and Florida. It can be found in woodlands and on disturbed sites at elevations below 200 m (667 feet). They are sometimes referred to as sand squares.

Paronychia rugelii is an annual herb up to 50 cm (20 inches) tall, nearly the entire above-ground parts with hairs. Leaves are ovate to lanceolate, up to 6 mm (0.24 inches) long. Flowers are reddish-brown and white.
