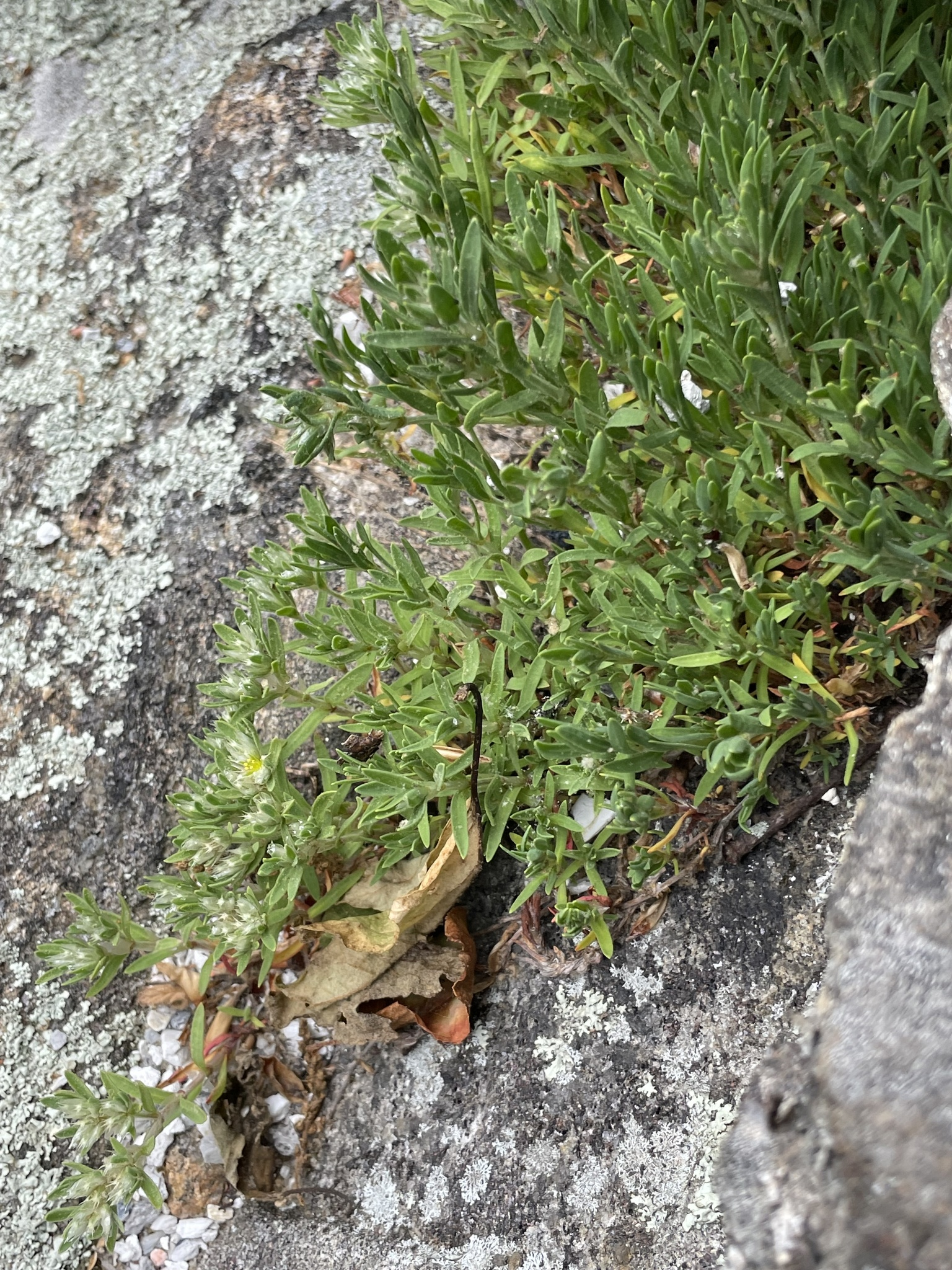
- In Situ at Blood Mountain, Georgia

Scientific classification
- Kingdom: Plantae
- Clade: Tracheophytes
- Clade: Angiosperms
- Clade: Eudicots
- Order: Caryophyllales
- Family: Caryophyllaceae
- Genus: Paronychia
- Species: P. argyrocoma

Binomial name
- Paronychia argyrocoma (Michx.) Nutt.

Synonyms
- Anychia argyrocoma Michx.; Paronychia argyrocoma var. albimontana Fernald; Paronychia argyrocoma subsp. albimontana (Fernald) Á. Löve & D. Löve

= Paronychia argyrocoma =

Species of flowering plant

Paronychia argyrocoma, the silvery nailwort or silverling, is a plant species native to the eastern United States. It has a disjunct distribution, found in New England (Maine, New Hampshire, Vermont and Massachusetts) and the Appalachian Mountains of the Southeast (Georgia, Tennessee, Kentucky, North Carolina, Virginia, West Virginia and Maryland) but not from New York, New Jersey or Pennsylvania in between. The species grows on rocky sites at elevations of 200–1800 m.

Paronychia argyrocoma is a perennial herb with a woody caudex, forming mats covering significant areas of ground. Stems are prostrate to ascending, highly branched, up to 60 cm long. Leaves are leathery, lanceolate, up to 3 cm long. Flowers are borne in glomerules (clumps) of up to 25 flowers, each greenish-brown and covered with long silky hairs and spines on the calyx lobes.
