= Nanorrhinum kuriense =

Conservation status
- Vulnerable (IUCN 3.1)

Scientific classification
- Kingdom: Plantae
- Clade: Tracheophytes
- Clade: Angiosperms
- Clade: Eudicots
- Clade: Asterids
- Order: Lamiales
- Family: Plantaginaceae
- Genus: Nanorrhinum
- Species: N. kuriense

Binomial name
- Nanorrhinum kuriense (Radcl.-Sm.) Ghebr. (2000 publ. 2001)

Synonyms
- Kickxia kuriensis Radcl.-Sm. (1971)

Species of flowering plant

Nanorrhinum kuriense is a species of plant in the family Plantaginaceae. It is an annual native to the islands of Abd al Kuri and Samhah in Yemen's Socotra Archipelago. It grows on dry rocky slopes, and on open sandy plains often in the shade of boulders, from sea level to 500 metres elevation.
