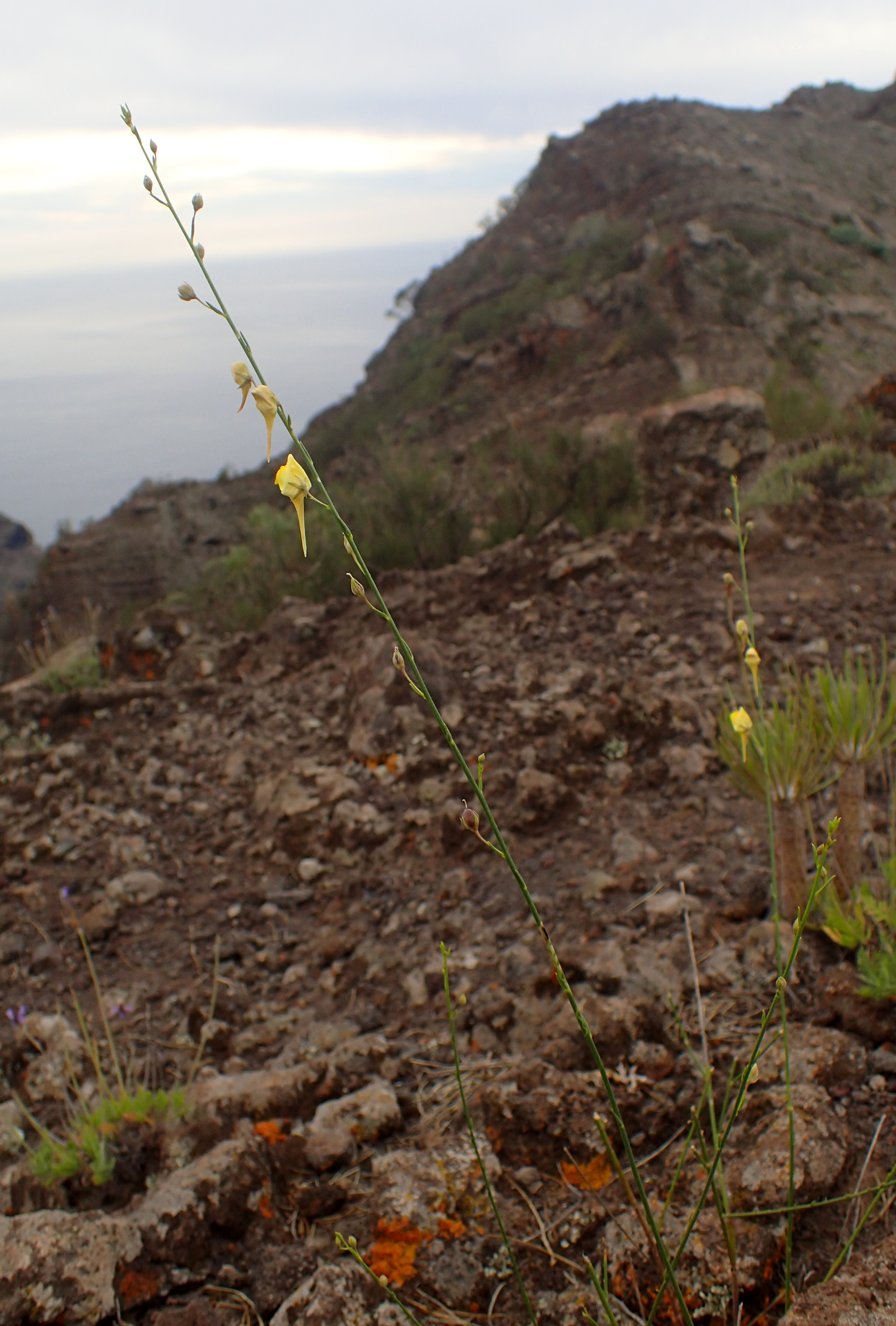
- In habitat, Los Carrizales, Tenerife

Scientific classification
- Kingdom: Plantae
- Clade: Tracheophytes
- Clade: Angiosperms
- Clade: Eudicots
- Clade: Asterids
- Order: Lamiales
- Family: Plantaginaceae
- Genus: Nanorrhinum
- Species: N. scoparium

Binomial name
- Nanorrhinum scoparium (Brouss. ex Spreng.) Yousefi & Zarre

Synonyms
- Elatinoides spartioides (Brouss. ex Buch) Wettst.; Kickxia scoparia (Brouss. ex Spreng.) G.Kunkel & Sunding; Kickxia spartioides (Brouss. ex Buch) Janch.; Linaria scoparia Brouss. ex Spreng.; Linaria spartioides Brouss. ex Buch; Pogonorrhinum scoparium (Brouss. ex Spreng.) Betsche

= Nanorrhinum scoparium =

Species of flowering plant

Nanorrhinum scoparium, synonym Kickxia scoparia, is a yellow-flowered plant native to rocky areas of the Canary Islands in the North Atlantic. It belongs to the plantain family (Plantaginaceae).

== Description ==
Nanorrhinum scoparium is an erect, mostly unbranched perennial plant. It has linear leaves with short or no stalks (petioles), that often fall off early in the plant's lifecycle. The petals are yellow, and the flower has a relatively long, more or less straight spur.

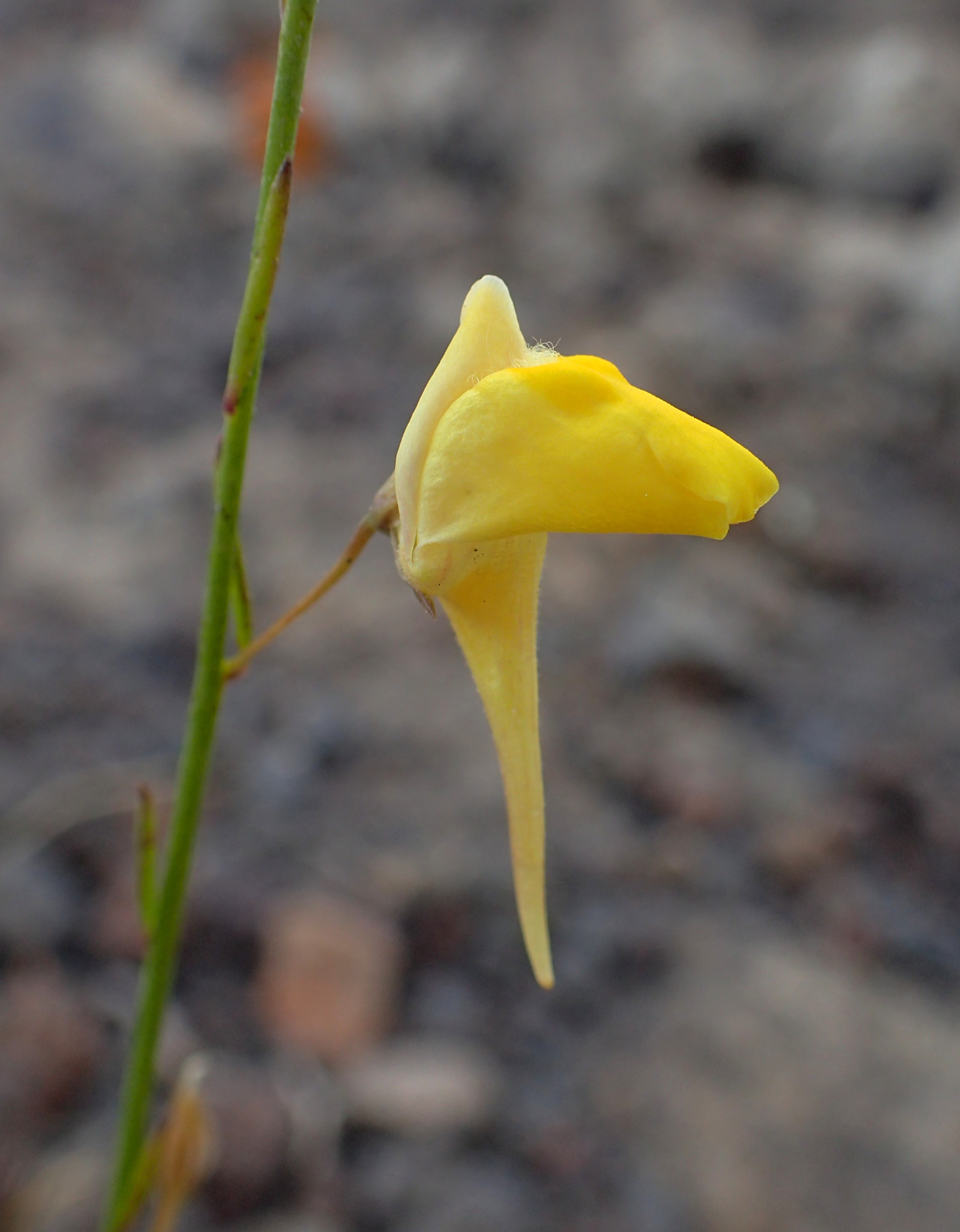
Flower

== Taxonomy ==
The species was first described by Pierre Broussonet in 1825 as Linaria scoparia. It was transferred to the genus Kickxia in 1972 by Günther Kunkel and Per Øgle Sunding. A molecular phylogenetic study in 2016 suggested that a group of species within Kickxia were better placed in Nanorrhinum; Nanorrhinum scoparium was one of the species transferred by Nafiseh Yousefi and Shahin Zarre.

== Distribution and habitat ==
Nanorrhinum scoparium is native to the Canary Islands, although some sources have suggested a wider distribution. In the Canary Islands, it is found in dry rocky slopes, up to elevations of 600 m.
