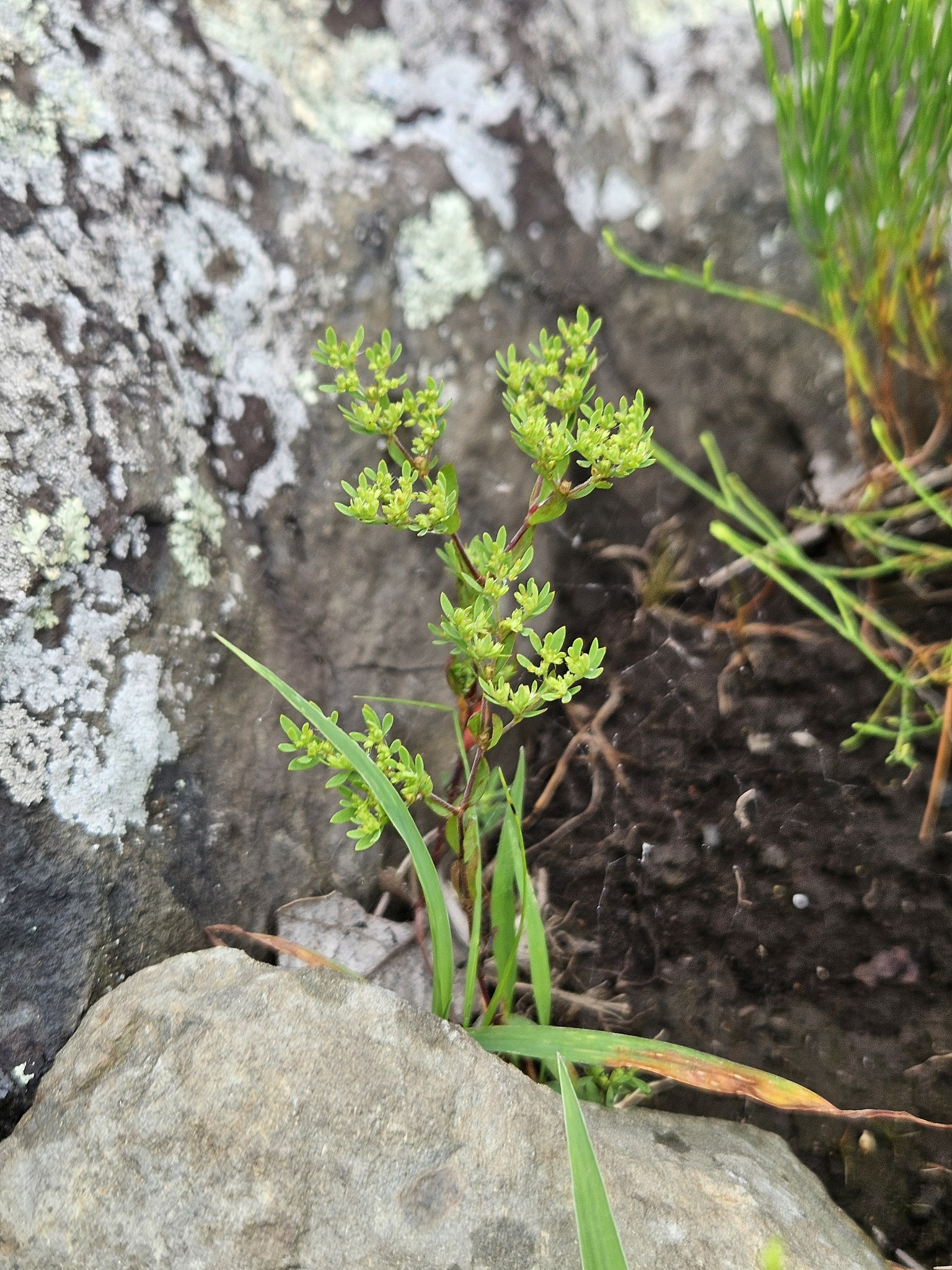

Scientific classification
- Kingdom: Plantae
- Clade: Tracheophytes
- Clade: Angiosperms
- Clade: Eudicots
- Order: Caryophyllales
- Family: Caryophyllaceae
- Genus: Paronychia
- Species: P. fastigiata

Binomial name
- Paronychia fastigiata (Raf.) Fernald

= Paronychia fastigiata =

Species of flowering plant

Paronychia fastigiata, common names hairy forked chickweed, hairy forked nailwort, and forked chickweed, is an annual plant native to North America.

== Conservation status within the United States ==
It is listed as a special concern species and believed extirpated in Connecticut, and it is endangered in Minnesota.
