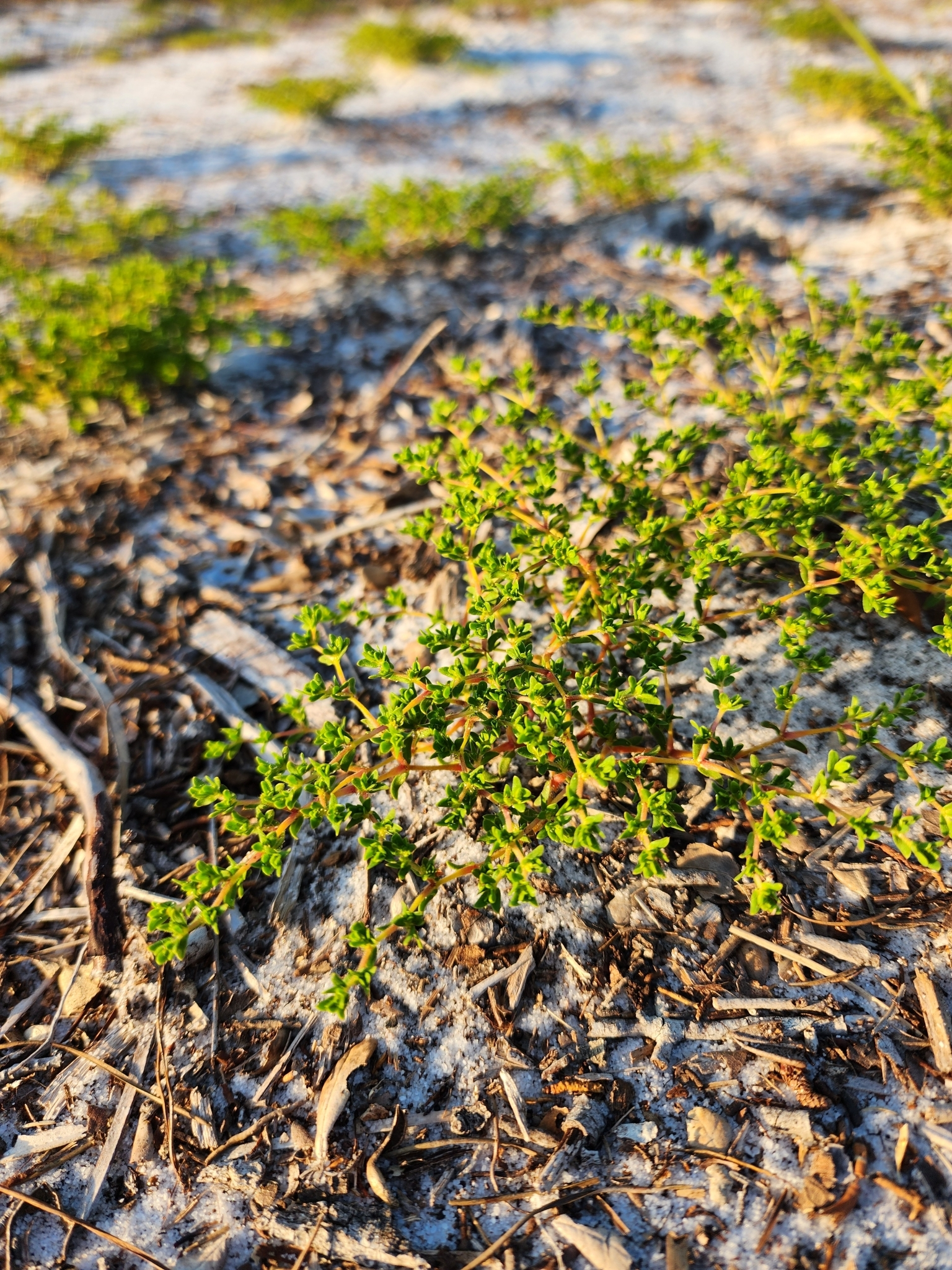

Conservation status
- Vulnerable (NatureServe)

Scientific classification
- Kingdom: Plantae
- Clade: Tracheophytes
- Clade: Angiosperms
- Clade: Eudicots
- Order: Caryophyllales
- Family: Caryophyllaceae
- Genus: Paronychia
- Species: P. herniarioides

Binomial name
- Paronychia herniarioides (Michaux) Nuttall

= Paronychia herniarioides =

Species of flowering plant

Paronychia herniarioides, commonly called coastal plain nailwort, is a threatened species of herbaceous annual flowering plant endemic to the U.S. southeastern coastal plain in the states of Florida, Alabama, Georgia, South Carolina, and North Carolina.

== Description ==
Paronychia herniarioides' limbs range from 5 to 35 cm (2.0 to 13.8 in) in length. Its leaves are obtuse and oblong-elliptical to spatulate in shape. They are 3 to 12 mm (0.12 to 0.47 in) in length and between 1.5 and 3.5 mm (0.059 and 0.138 in) in width.

== Habitat ==
It occurs in the exposed, sandy soils of the fire-dependent habitats of the southeast including sandhill and scrub. It is rare across its range, except for Florida where it is still uncommon.

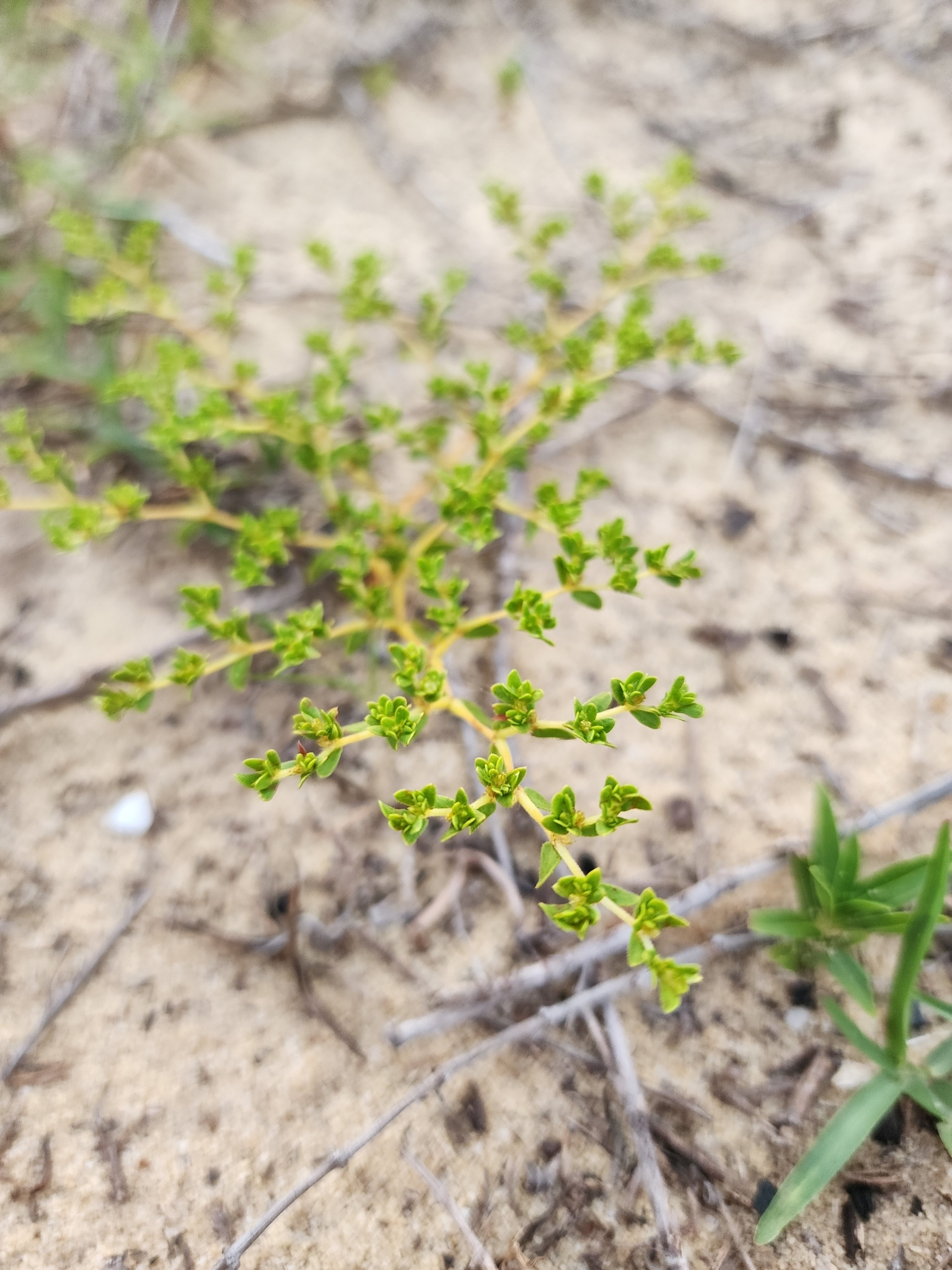
Specimen growing in yellow sand sandhill habitat in Highlands County, FL

Its rarity is exemplified by the fact that the only evidence of its existence in North Carolina for over 200 years was the type specimen found by Michaux until its recent rediscovery in Scotland County, NC.

== Conservation ==
This species is state-listed S1 (critically imperiled) in AL, SC, and NC.
