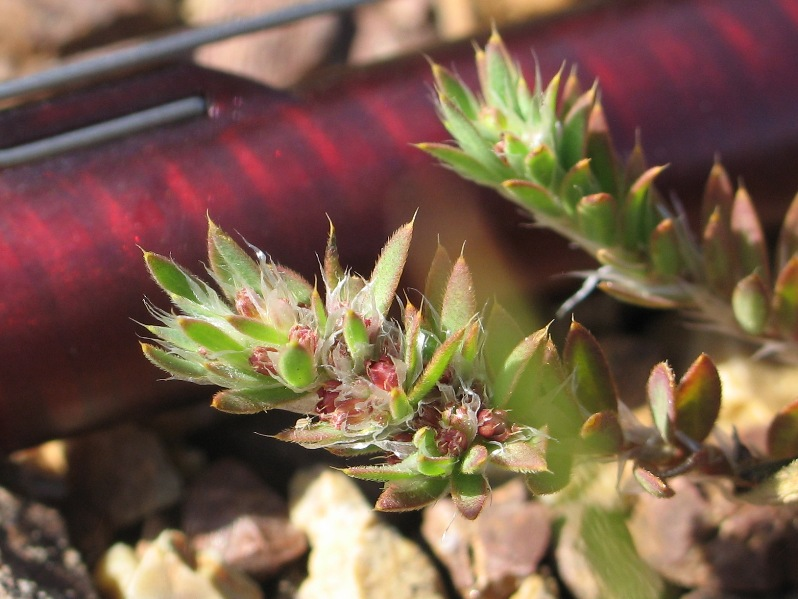

Scientific classification
- Kingdom: Plantae
- Clade: Tracheophytes
- Clade: Angiosperms
- Clade: Eudicots
- Order: Caryophyllales
- Family: Caryophyllaceae
- Genus: Paronychia
- Species: P. franciscana

Binomial name
- Paronychia franciscana Eastw.

= Paronychia franciscana =

Species of plant

Paronychia franciscana is a species of flowering plant in the family Caryophyllaceae known by the common names San Francisco nailwort, California Whitlow-wort, Franciscan paronychia, and Chilean nailwort. It is native to Chile, but it was first described from specimens collected in San Francisco, California, in the United States, where it is an introduced species.

This species is a mat-forming perennial herb growing from a woody caudex. The branching stems stretch prostrate along the ground, reaching up to 50 centimetres (20 inches) in length. The fleshy, somewhat hairy leaves are up to a centimeter long, including their spiny tips. They cover the stems densely. The inflorescence is a tightly packed cyme of two to six flowers emerging from between leaves. They have no petals, but five tiny green to reddish sepals. The fruit is a utricle just over a millimeter long.

This species' native range is in mainland Chile. It is present as an introduction and a weed in the Juan Fernández Islands, particularly Robinson Crusoe Island and Alejandro Selkirk Island, off the Chilean coast. It is also a non-native weed in New South Wales and Victoria in Australia. It has been known from the San Francisco Bay Area since 1887, where it was a common introduced plant growing on the grounds of the Presidio before it ever had a name. Botanist Alice Eastwood used California specimens to give the plant its formal name.
