= Baía de Tarrafal =

Bight in Cape Verde

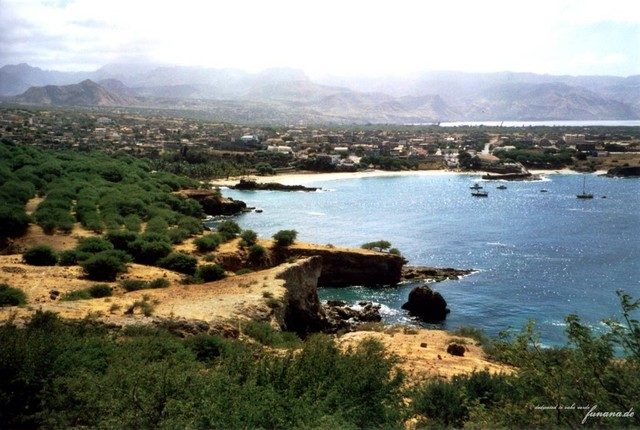

- Location within Cape Verde
- Location: West of Tarrafal, Santiago, Cape Verde
- Coordinates: 15.2837°N 23.7602°W
- Max. length: 2 km (1.2 mi)
- Max. width: 1 km (0.62 mi)
- Average depth: 5 m (16 ft)

Baía de Tarrafal or Tarrafal Bay is a bay of the Atlantic Ocean on the northwest coast of the island of Santiago in Cape Verde. The town of Tarrafal lies at its southeastern shore, and 643 m high Monte Graciosa rises from its northern shore. Most of its coast is rocky, but there is a stretch of beach near the city. The headland Ponta Preta marks the northwestern limit of the bay; there is a lighthouse (Farol da Ponta Preta) on it.

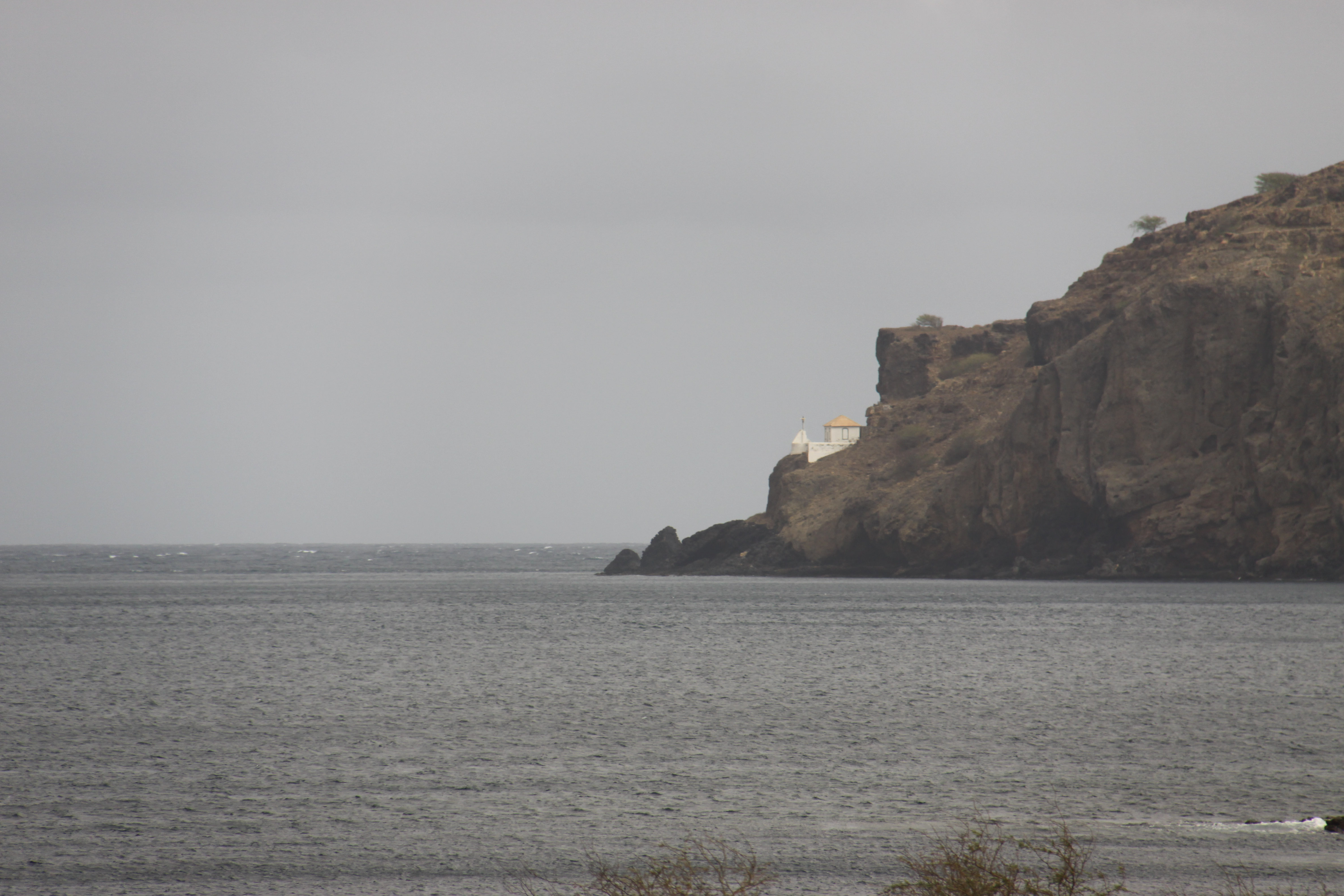
The north part of the bay with Ponta Preta and its lighthouse

== Fauna ==
Marine fauna found in the waters include the goose barnacle Pollicipes caboverdensis and the coral Balanopsammia wirtzi, the only species of the genus. Fish found near the promontory include the Cape Verde basslet (Liopropoma emanueli) and the two-banded seabream (Diplodus prayensis).
