= Nanorrhinum webbianum =

Scientific classification
- Kingdom: Plantae
- Clade: Tracheophytes
- Clade: Angiosperms
- Clade: Eudicots
- Clade: Asterids
- Order: Lamiales
- Family: Plantaginaceae
- Genus: Nanorrhinum
- Species: N. webbianum

Binomial name
- Nanorrhinum webbianum (J.A.Schmidt) Betsche

Synonyms
- Kickxia elegans subsp. webbiana; Kickxia webbiana

Species of flowering plant

Nanorrhinum webbianum is a species of flowering plant in the family Plantaginaceae, endemic to Cape Verde. The local name of the plant is agrião-de-rocha ("rock-cress").

== Distribution and habitat ==
Nanorrhinum webbianum is found in the island of Santo Antão.
