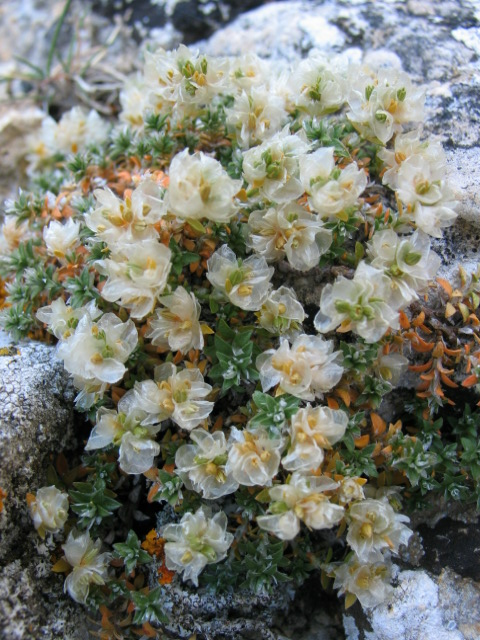
- Paronychia argentea

Scientific classification
- Kingdom: Plantae
- Clade: Tracheophytes
- Clade: Angiosperms
- Clade: Eudicots
- Order: Caryophyllales
- Family: Caryophyllaceae
- Genus: Paronychia; Mill.

Species
- 110+, see text

= Paronychia (plant) =

Genus of flowering plants

Paronychia is a genus of plants in the family Caryophyllaceae with over 110 species worldwide, mostly from warm-temperate North America, Eurasia, South America and Africa. They are annual or biennial or perennial herbs. Some species have a woody base. For the most part they have small, white to yellow-white flowers that are often hidden within the paired bracts.

The genus Siphonychia has been incorporated into Paronychia by botanists.

The common names for some of the species include chickweed, nailwort, and Whitlow-wort. The genus gets its name from the disease of the fingernails which it was once thought to cure. Traditional healers in modern-day use species of this genus to treat kidney stones.

== Selected species ==
- Paronychia ahartii – Ahart's nailwort
- Paronychia argentea – Algerian tea
- Paronychia argyrocoma – Silvery nailwort
- Paronychia canadensis – smooth-forked nailwort
- Paronychia chartacea – paper nailwort
- Paronychia drummondii – Drummond's nailwort
- Paronychia fastigiata – hairy-forked nailwort
- Paronychia franciscana – San Francisco nailwort
- Paronychia herniarioides – coastal plain nailwort
- Paronychia jamesii – James' nailwort
- Paronychia palaestina
- Paronychia rugelii – Rugel's nailwort
- Paronychia sessiliflora – creeping nailwort
- Paronychia virginica – Virginia nailwort or Yellow nailwort
