= Ponta Preta (Maio) =

- Headland
- Location within Cape Verde
- Coordinates: 15°07′41″N 23°12′25″W
- Location: Southwestern Maio, Cape Verde
- Water bodies: Atlantic Ocean

Ponta Preta (Portuguese meaning the black point) is a headland located in the southwest of the island of Maio, Cape Verde. It is 1 km southeast of the town Porto Inglês.
