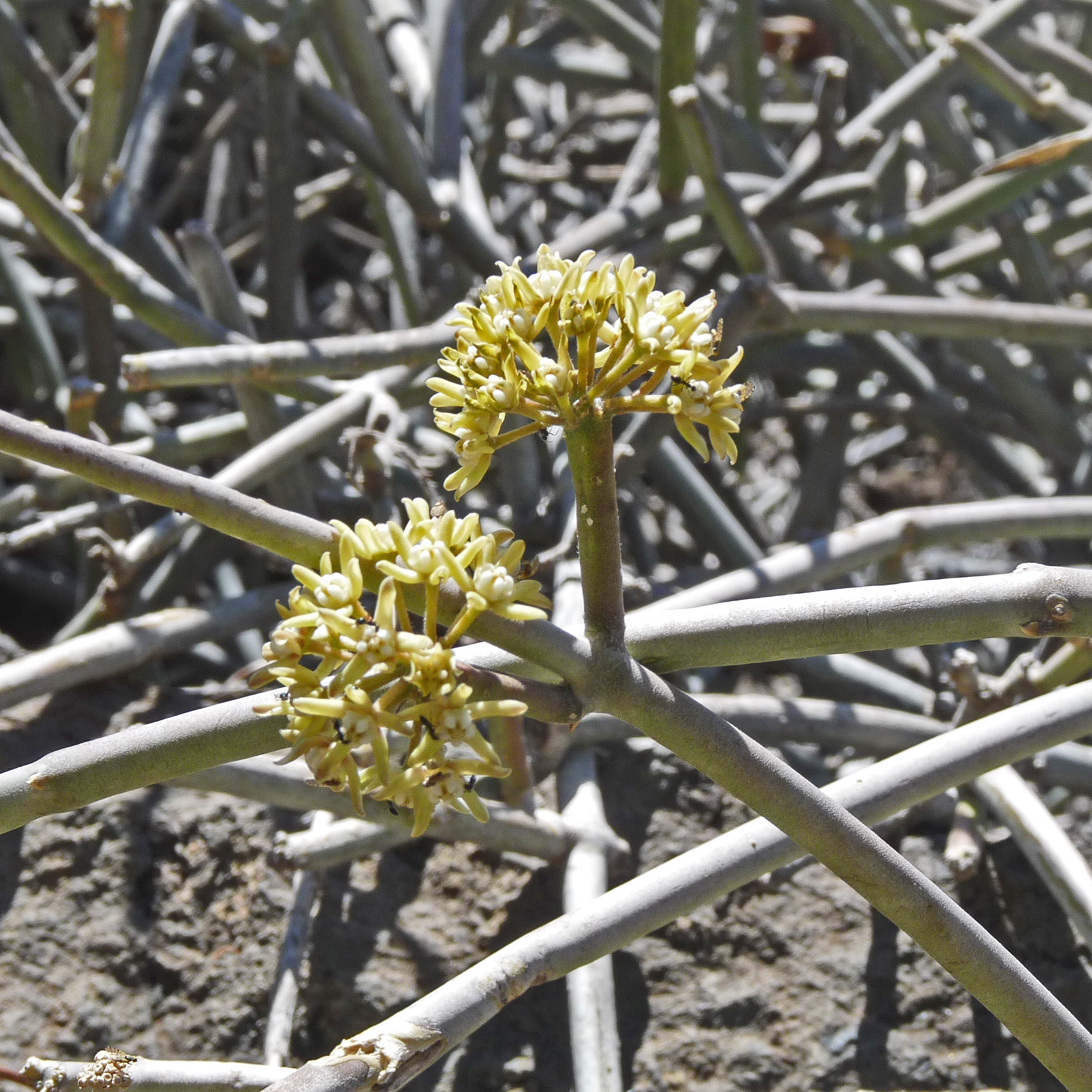
- Flowers on Fogo

Conservation status
- Least Concern (IUCN 3.1)

Scientific classification
- Kingdom: Plantae
- Clade: Tracheophytes
- Clade: Angiosperms
- Clade: Eudicots
- Clade: Asterids
- Order: Gentianales
- Family: Apocynaceae
- Genus: Cynanchum
- Species: C. daltonii

Binomial name
- Cynanchum daltonii (Decne.) Liede & Meve

Synonyms
- Sarcostemma daltonii Decne.; Sarcostemma nudum C.Sm. ex Decne.

= Cynanchum daltonii =

Species of plant

Cynanchum daltonii, synonym Sarcostemma daltonii, is a species of flowering plants of the family Apocynaceae. The species is endemic to Cape Verde. The specific name refers to Joseph Dalton Hooker. The species was named by Joseph Decaisne, as Sarcostemma daltonii, in 1849. Its local name is gestiba. The plant is used in traditional medicine to relieve and treat dental problems.

== Distribution and ecology ==
Cynanchum daltonii occurs in most islands of Cape Verde except Sal, Maio and Santa Luzia. It grows in arid, semi-arid and sub-humid zones.
