= Ponta Preta Lighthouse =

Lighthouse on Santiago, Cape Verde

Ponta Preta Lighthouse Farol da Ponte Preta
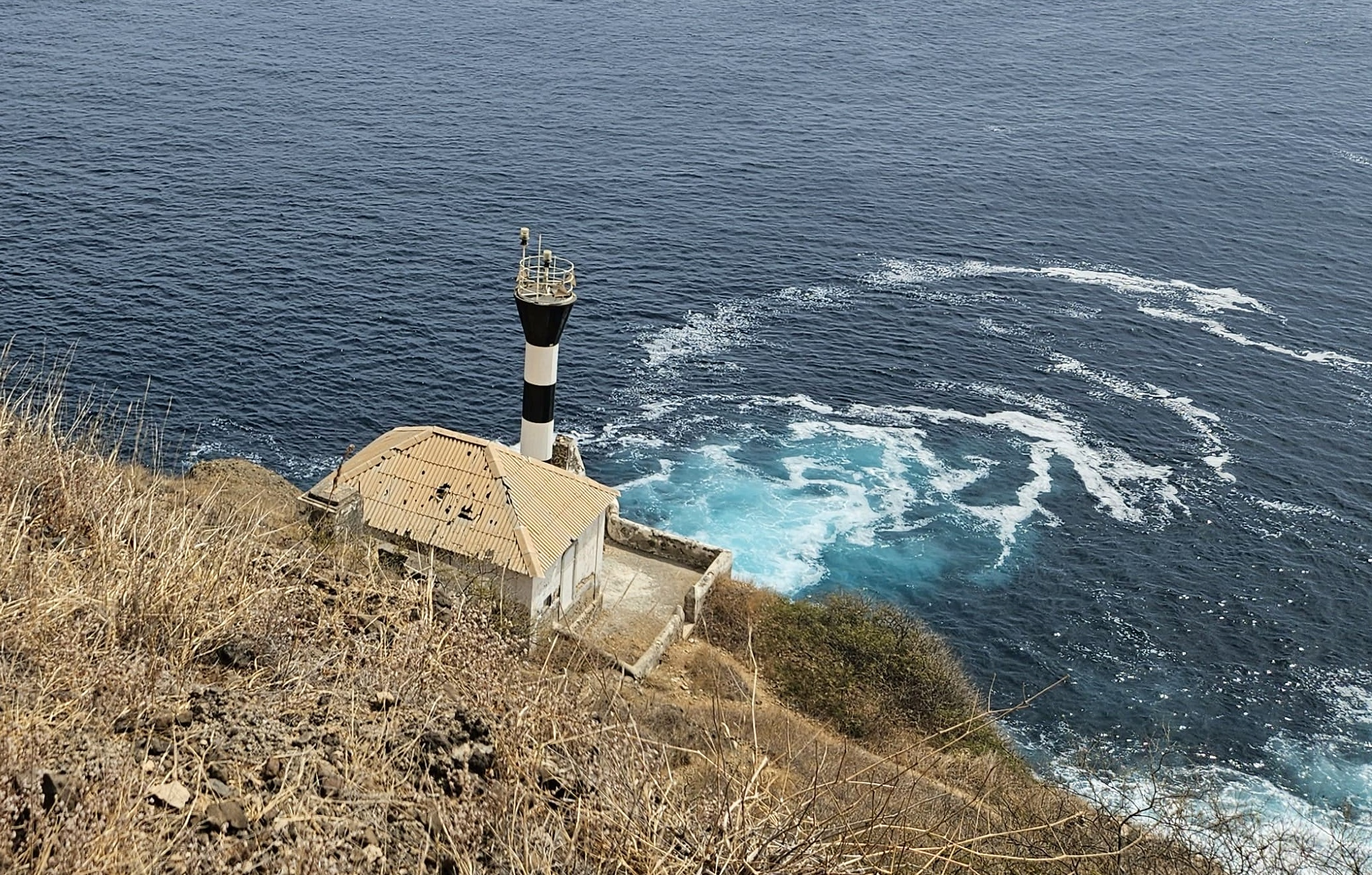
- Ponta Preta Lighthouse in the northwesternmost area of Santiago Island
- Location: Tarrafal; Santiago; Cape Verde
- Coordinates: 15°17′34.4″N 23°46′16.4″W

Tower
- Constructed: 1889
- Foundation: masonry base
- Construction: metal post
- Height: 6 metres (20 ft)
- Shape: post light atop a pyramidal base
- Markings: white post and base

Light
- Focal height: 34 metres (112 ft)
- Range: 8 nautical miles (15 km; 9.2 mi)
- Characteristic: Fl (3) W 12s.
- Cape Verde no.: PT-2148

Farol da Ponta Preta (the Ponta Preta Lighthouse) is a lighthouse on the northwesternmost part of the island of Santiago, Cape Verde. It stands on the headland Ponta Preta, 3 km northwest of the city Tarrafal. The lighthouse was originally constructed in 1889. Its lantern stands on a new black and white tower, in front of a small one storey building. The lighthouse was depicted on a Cape Verdean stamp in 2004.

== See also ==
- List of lighthouses in Cape Verde
- List of buildings and structures in Santiago, Cape Verde

== Gallery ==
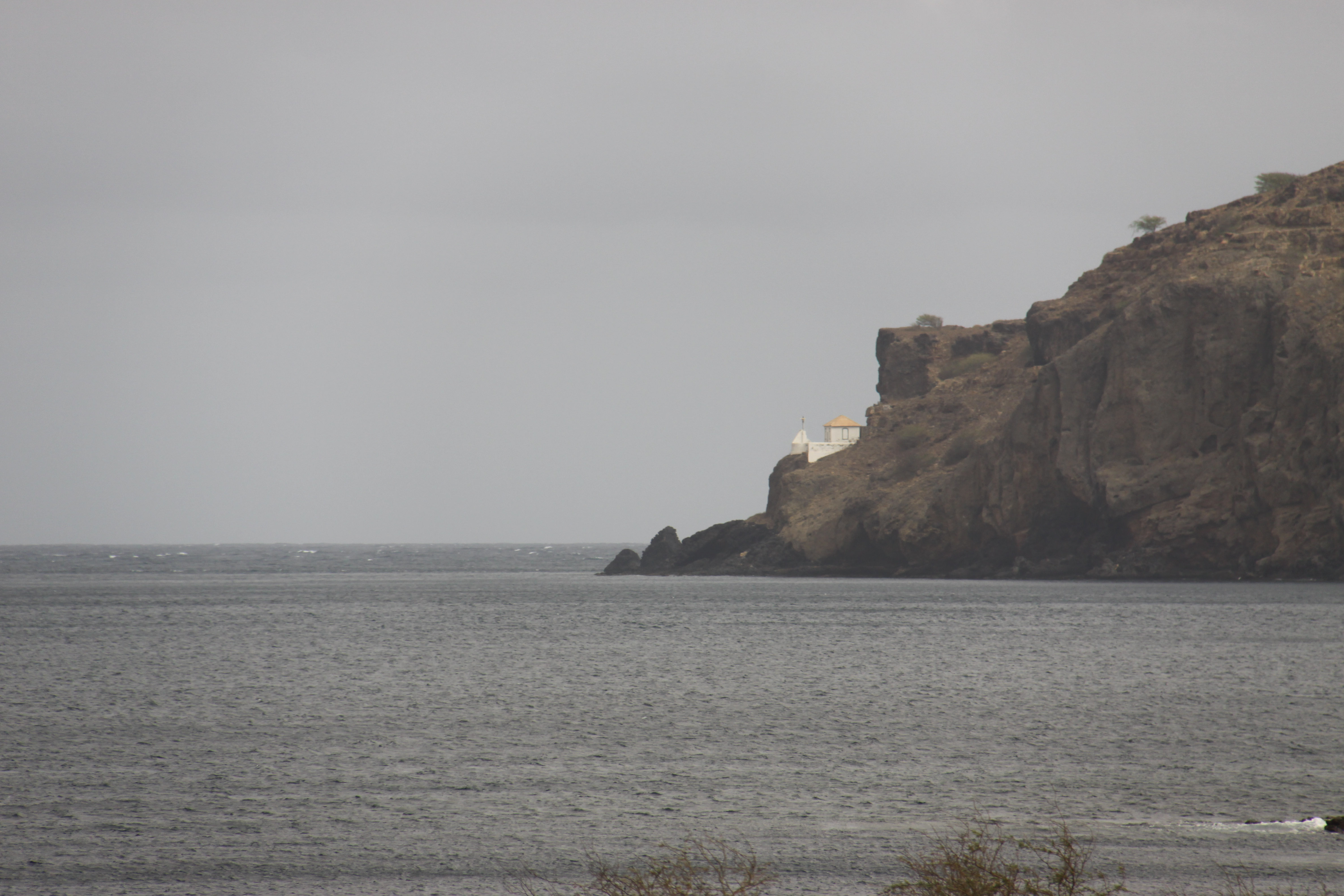
Ponta Preta Lighthouse from the southeastern side of the bay

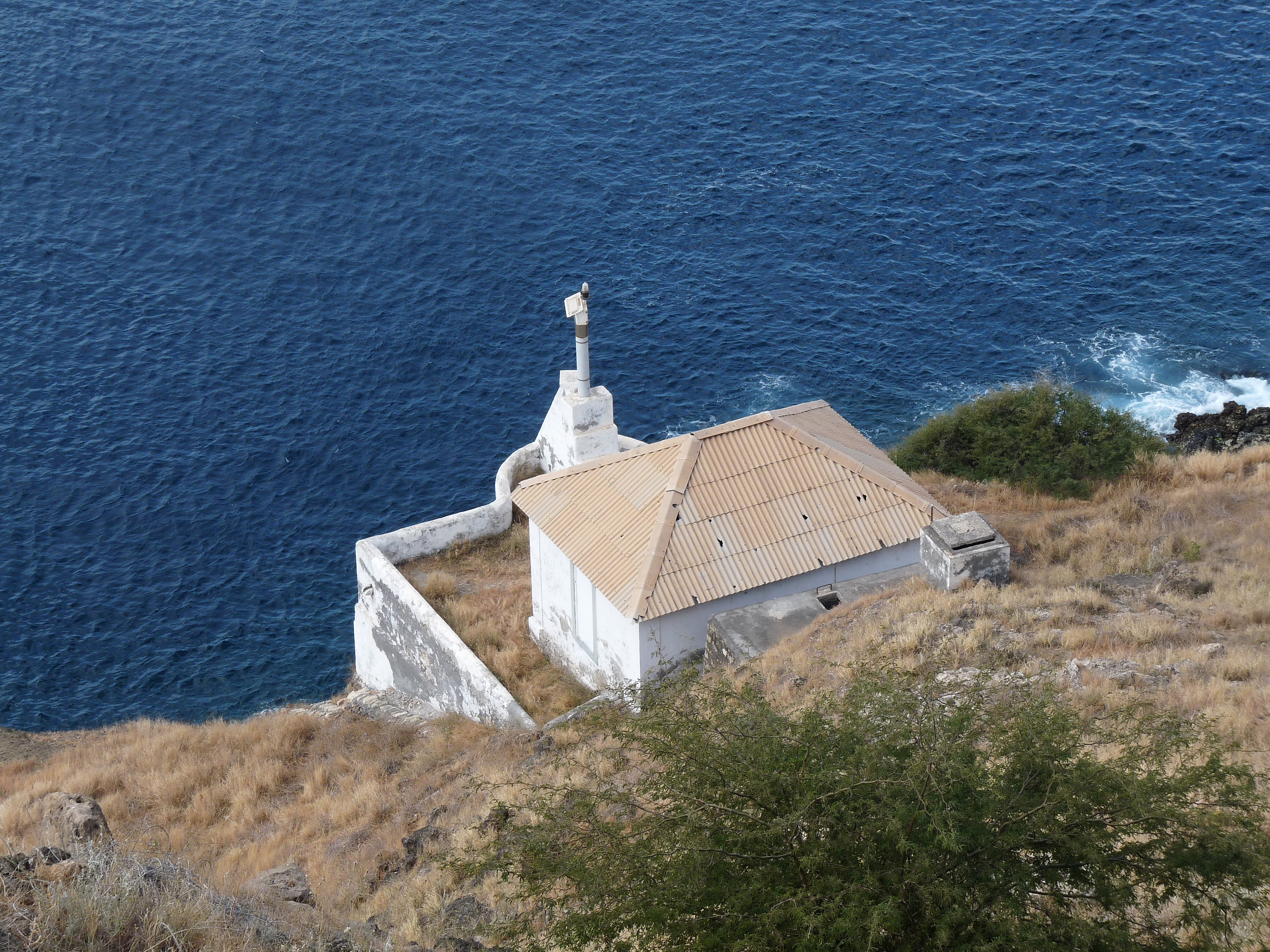
The old white column, later replaced by the new black and white tower

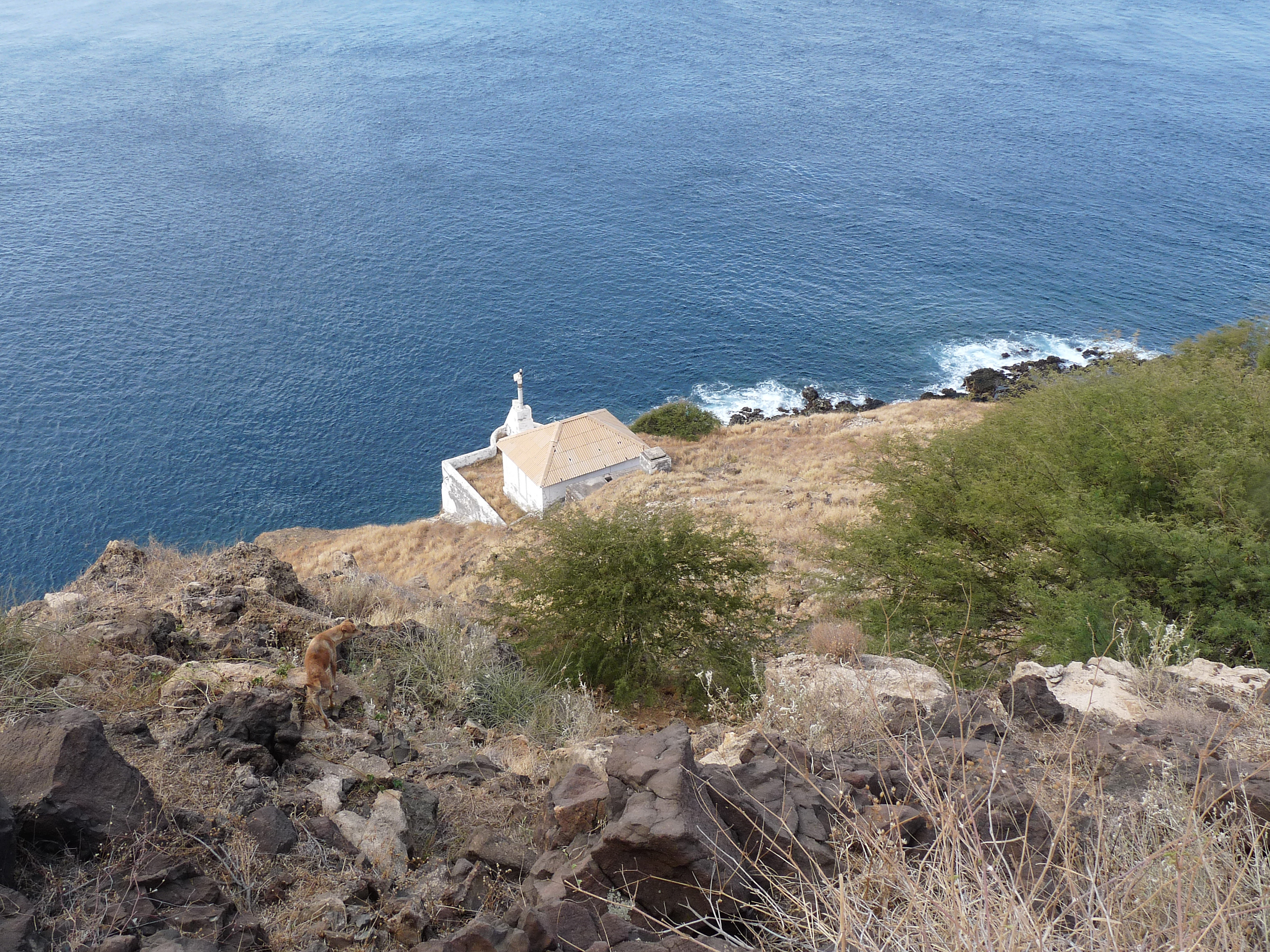
Ponta Preta Lighthouse above the nearby hill
