= Ponta Preta (Santiago) =

- Headland
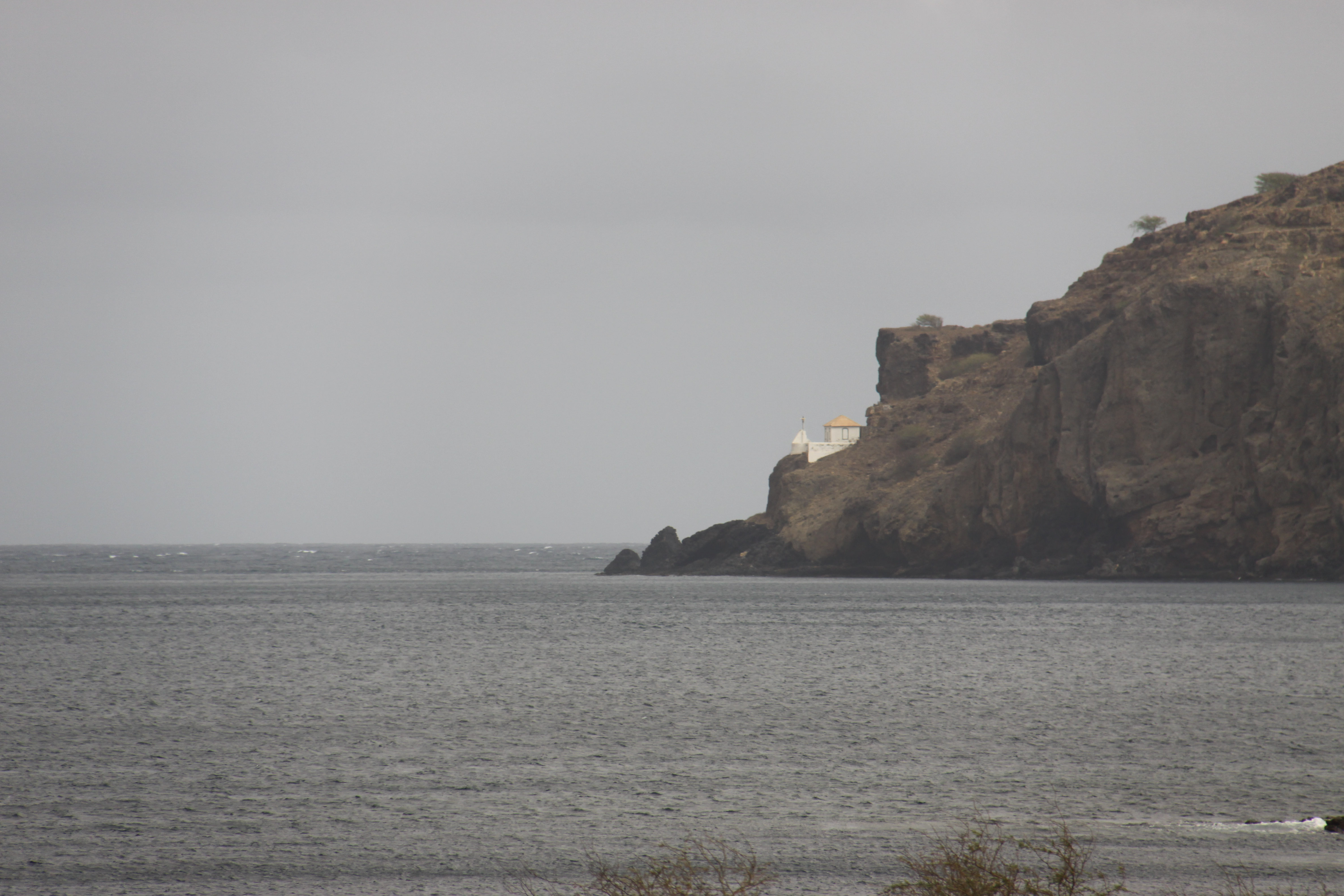
- The north part of the bay along with Ponta Preta and its lighthouse

- Cape Verde
- Coordinates: 15°17′39″N 23°46′20″W
- Location: Northern Santiago, Cape Verde 3 km north of Tarrafal
- Offshore water bodies: Atlantic Ocean

Ponta Preta is a headland in the northwest of the island of Santiago, Cape Verde. It is about 3 km northwest of the town of Tarrafal, and marks the northwestern limit of Baía de Tarrafal (Tarrafal Bay). There is a lighthouse on the headland, Farol da Ponta Preta.
