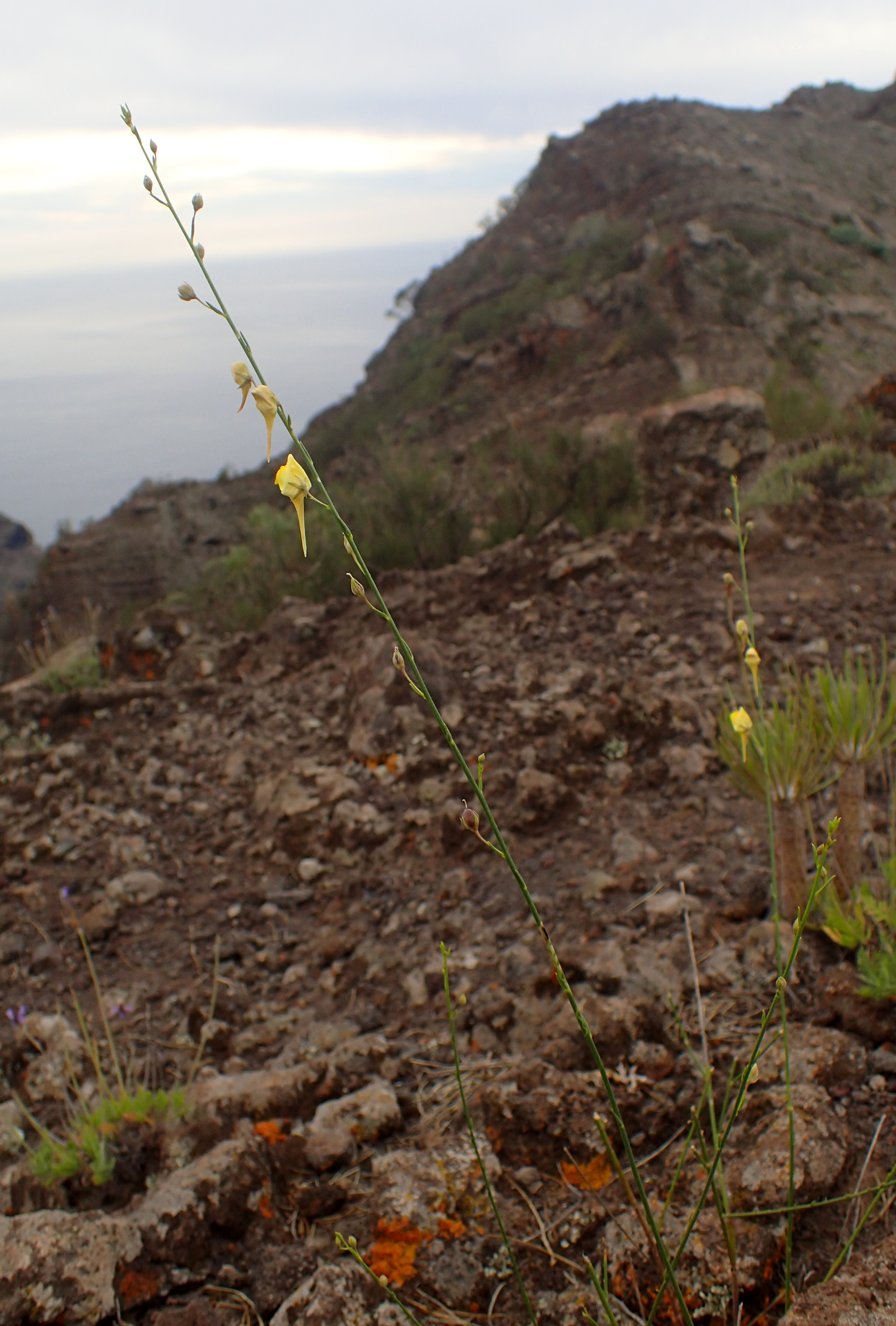
- Nanorrhinum scoparium

Scientific classification
- Kingdom: Plantae
- Clade: Tracheophytes
- Clade: Angiosperms
- Clade: Eudicots
- Clade: Asterids
- Order: Lamiales
- Family: Plantaginaceae
- Tribe: Antirrhineae
- Genus: Nanorrhinum; Betsche

= Nanorrhinum =

Genus of flowering plants

Nanorrhinum is a genus of flowering plants in family Plantaginaceae. It includes 29 species ranging from the Sahara and Sahel of northern Africa to the Arabian Peninsula, Iran, the Indian subcontinent, and Myanmar.

== Species ==
As of February 2018, Plants of the World Online accepted the following species:

- Nanorrhinum acerbianum (Boiss.) Betsche
- Nanorrhinum asparagoides (Schweinf.) Ghebr.
- Nanorrhinum azraqense (Boulos & Lahham) Ghebr.
- Nanorrhinum baluchestanicum Naanaie, Assadi & Tavassoli
- Nanorrhinum bentii (Skan) Betsche
- Nanorrhinum cabulicum (Benth.) Podlech & Iranshahr
- Nanorrhinum campyloceras (Rech.f. & Esfand.) Naanaie, Assadi & Tavassoli
- Nanorrhinum chasmophyticum (Wendelbo) Naanaie, Assadi & Tavassoli
- Nanorrhinum dichondrifolium (Benth.) Betsche
- Nanorrhinum elegans (G.Forst.) Ghebr.
- Nanorrhinum hastatum (R.Br. ex Benth.) Ghebr.
- Nanorrhinum heterophyllum (Schousb.) Ghebr.
- Nanorrhinum incanum (Wall.) Betsche
- Nanorrhinum judaicum (Danin) Yousefi & Zarre
- Nanorrhinum khuzestanicum Naanaie, Assadi & Tavassoli
- Nanorrhinum kuriense (Radcl.-Sm.) Ghebr.
- Nanorrhinum macilentum (Decne.) Betsche
- Nanorrhinum monodianum (Maire) Ibn Tattou
- Nanorrhinum ovatum (Benth.) Podlech & Iranshahr
- Nanorrhinum petranum (Danin) Yousefi & Zarre
- Nanorrhinum ramosissimum (Wall.) Betsche
- Nanorrhinum roseiflorum Mosti, Raffaelli & Tardelli
- Nanorrhinum sagittatum (Poir.) Yousefi & Zarre
- Nanorrhinum scariosepalum (Täckh. & Boulos) Yousefi & Zarre
- Nanorrhinum scoparium (Brouss. ex Spreng.) Yousefi & Zarre
- Nanorrhinum stenanthum (Franch.) Ghebr.
- Nanorrhinum urbanii (Pit.) Yousefi & Zarre
- Nanorrhinum webbianum (J.A.Schmidt) Betsche
- Nanorrhinum woodii (D.A.Sutton) Ghebr.
