= Tarrafal, Cape Verde =

Tarrafal
- Settlement
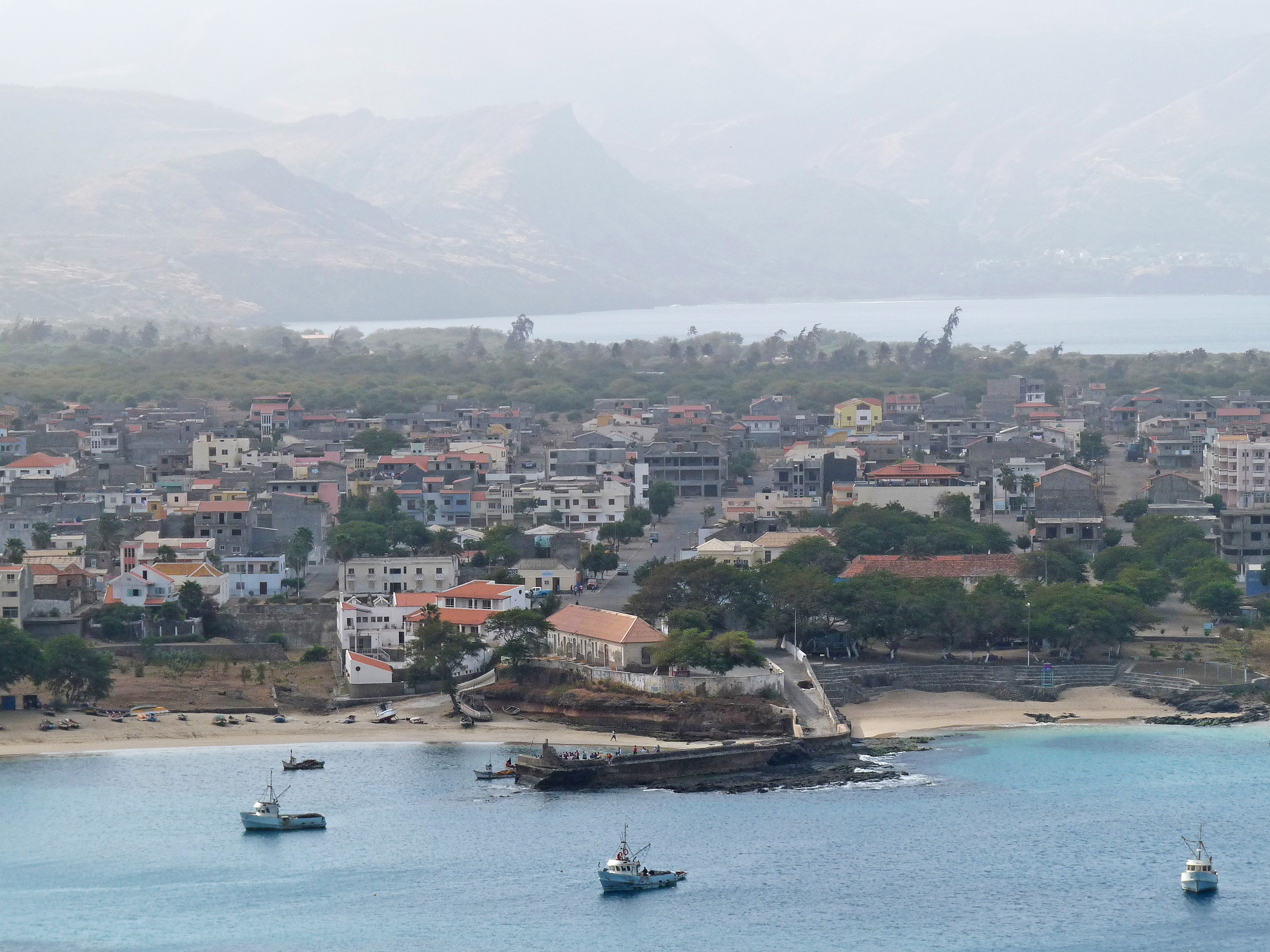
- View of the town of Tarrafal

- Location within Cape Verde
- Coordinates: 15.278°N 23.752°W
- Country: Cape Verde
- Island: Santiago
- Municipality: Tarrafal
- Civil parish: Santo Amaro Abade

Population (2010)
  - Total: 6,656
- ID: 71120

Tarrafal (also: Mangui or Mangue) is a city in the northern part of the island of Santiago, Cape Verde. In 2010 its population was 6,656. It is a fishing port situated on the northwestern coast. It constitutes the seat of the Tarrafal Municipality.

== Geography ==
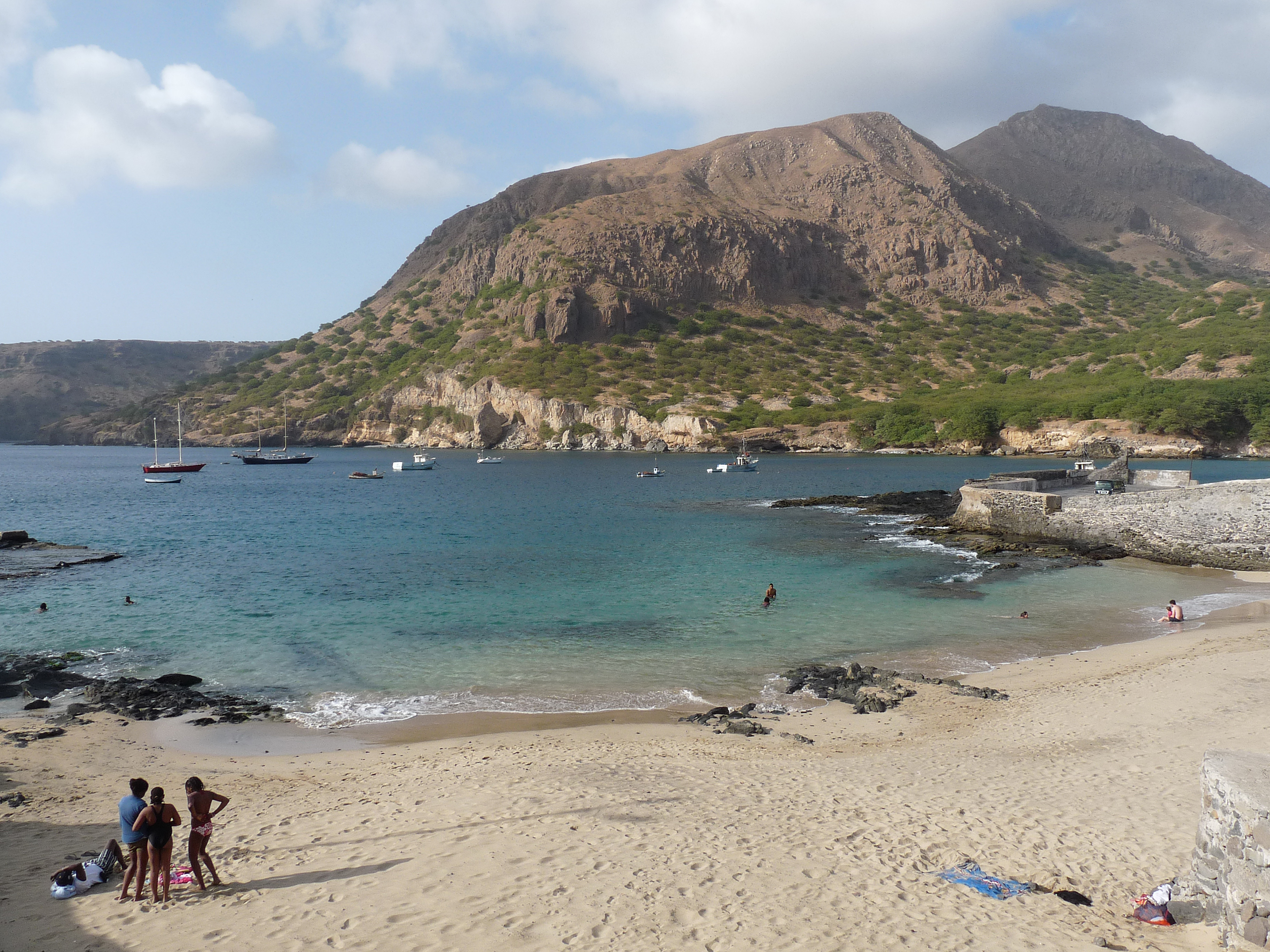
Tarrafal Beach with Monte Graciosa

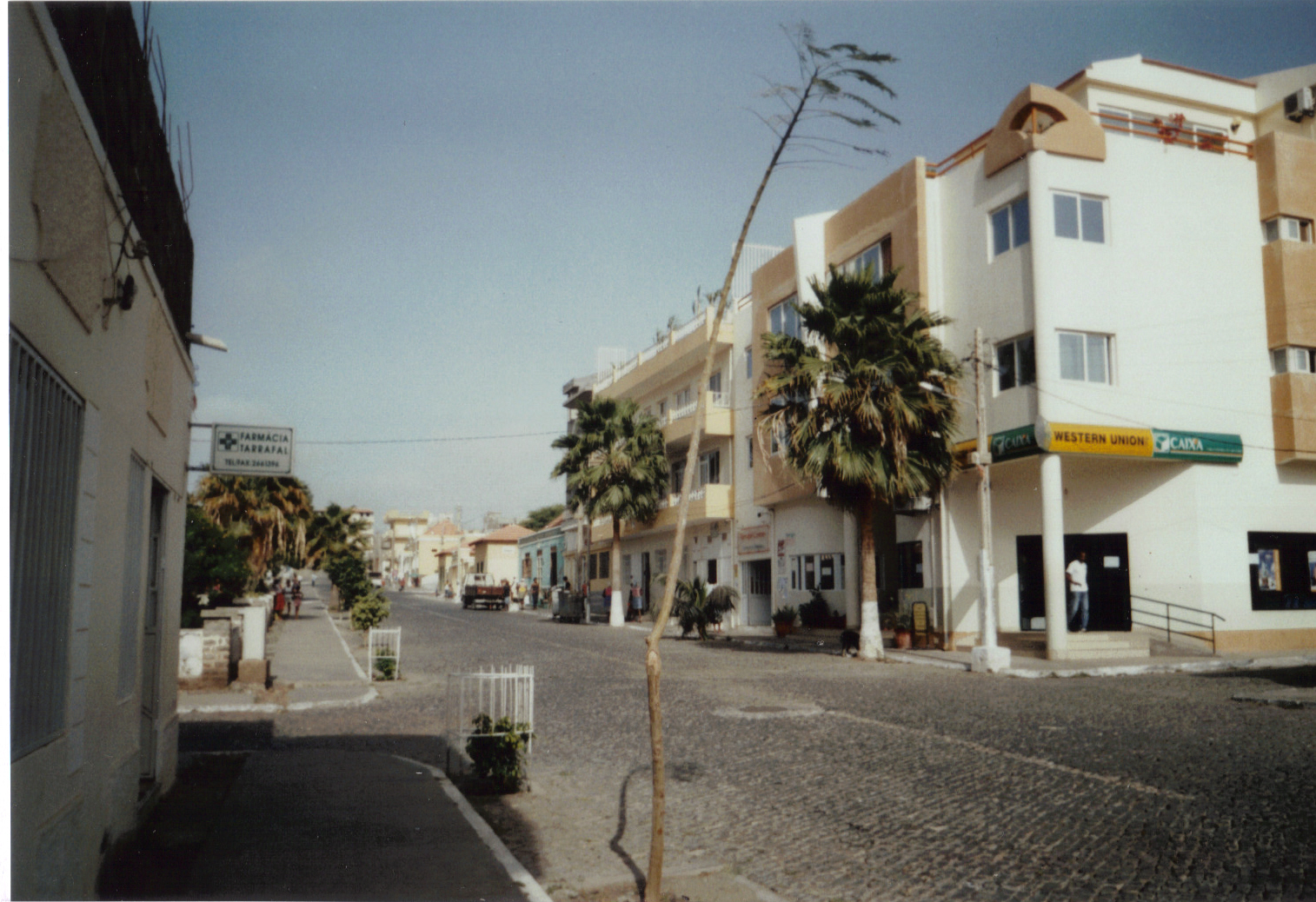
Tarrafal's Main street

The city is situated by the Baía de Tarrafal, at the foot of 643 m high Monte Graciosa. Tarrafal is at the northern end of two main roads to Praia in the south, one leading through Assomada and São Domingos (EN1-ST01), the other along the east coast through Calheta de São Miguel and Pedra Badejo (EN1-ST02).

== History ==
The origin of the toponym “Tarrafal” is the Portuguese word “tarrafal”, which means a plantation of the indigenous plant “tarrafe”, Tamarix senegalensis. The settlement was mentioned in the 1747 map by Jacques-Nicolas Bellin as "Terrafal". In 1917, the municipality of Tarrafal was separated from Santa Catarina, and the town Tarrafal became its seat. Between 1936 and 1974, political prisoners were held at the Tarrafal camp, south of the city. At least 32 prisoners died in the camp, which now houses a museum.

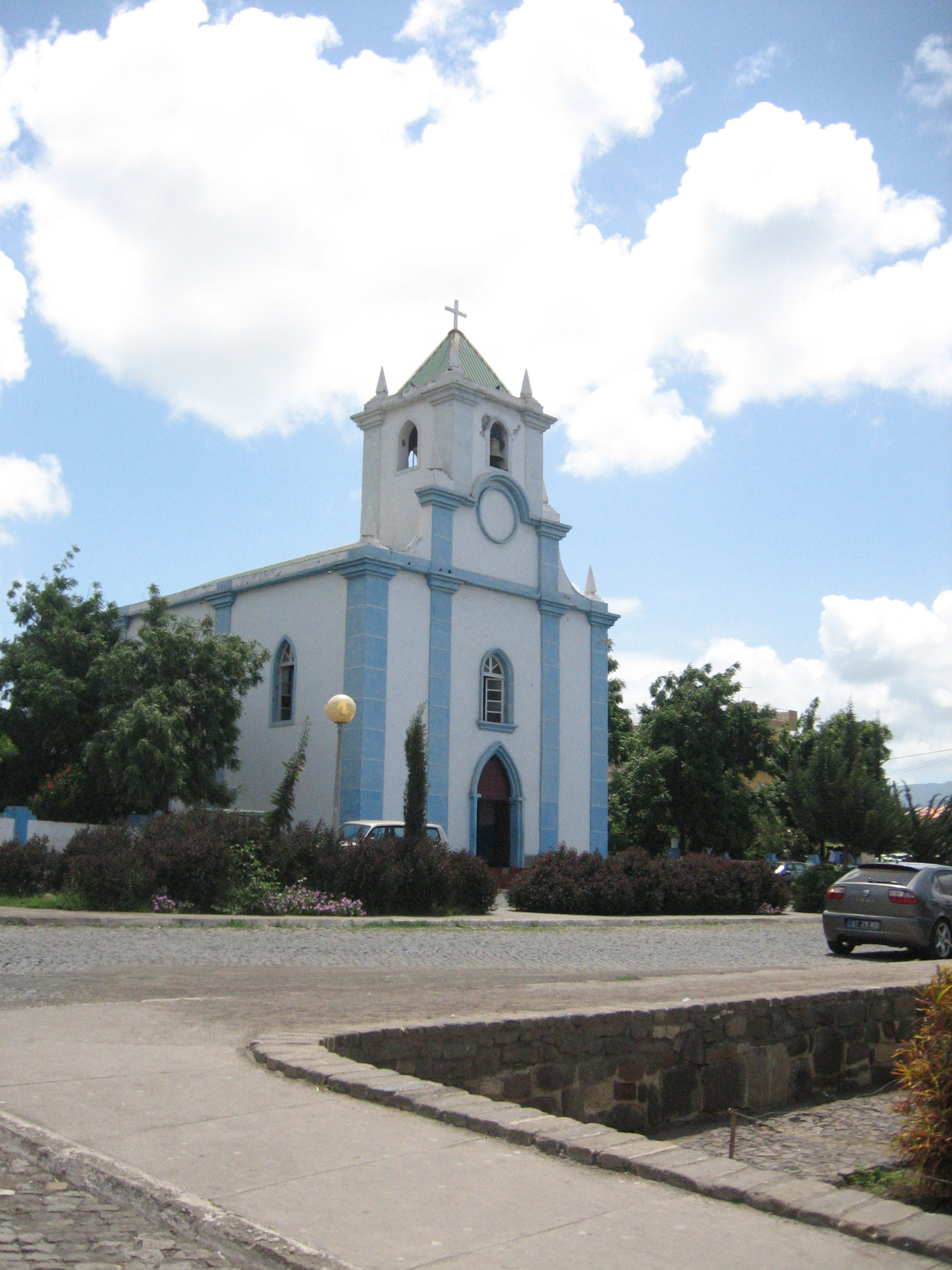
Santo Amaro Church

== Demographics ==
Year	Population
23 June 1990, census	3,626
16 June 2000, census	5,785
1 January 2005, estimate	6,463
2010, census	6,656

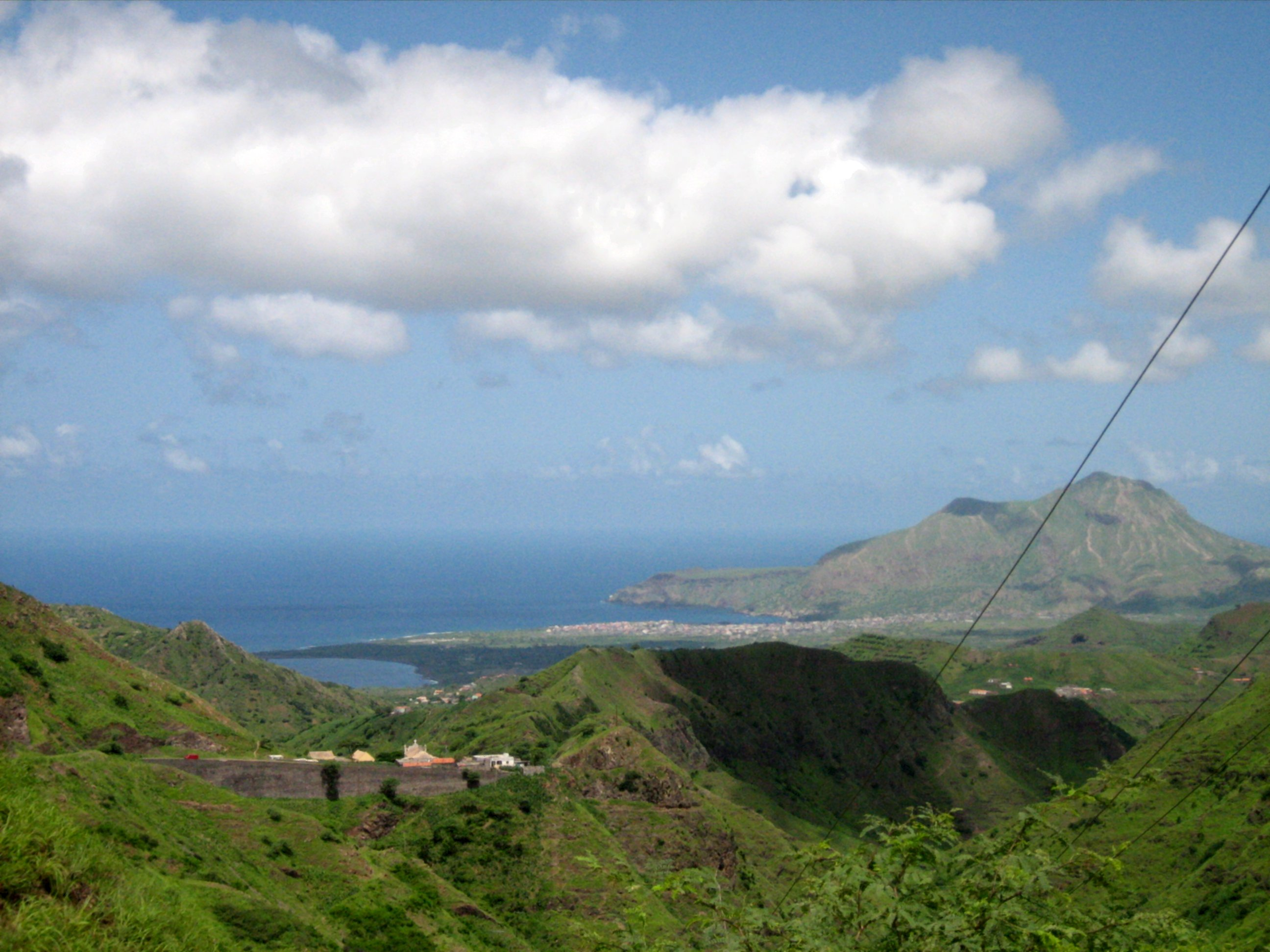
View over Tarrafal along with Monte Graciosa from the Serra Malagueta ranges

== See also ==
- List of cities and towns in Cape Verde
