= Wildlife of Cape Verde =

Location of Cape Verde

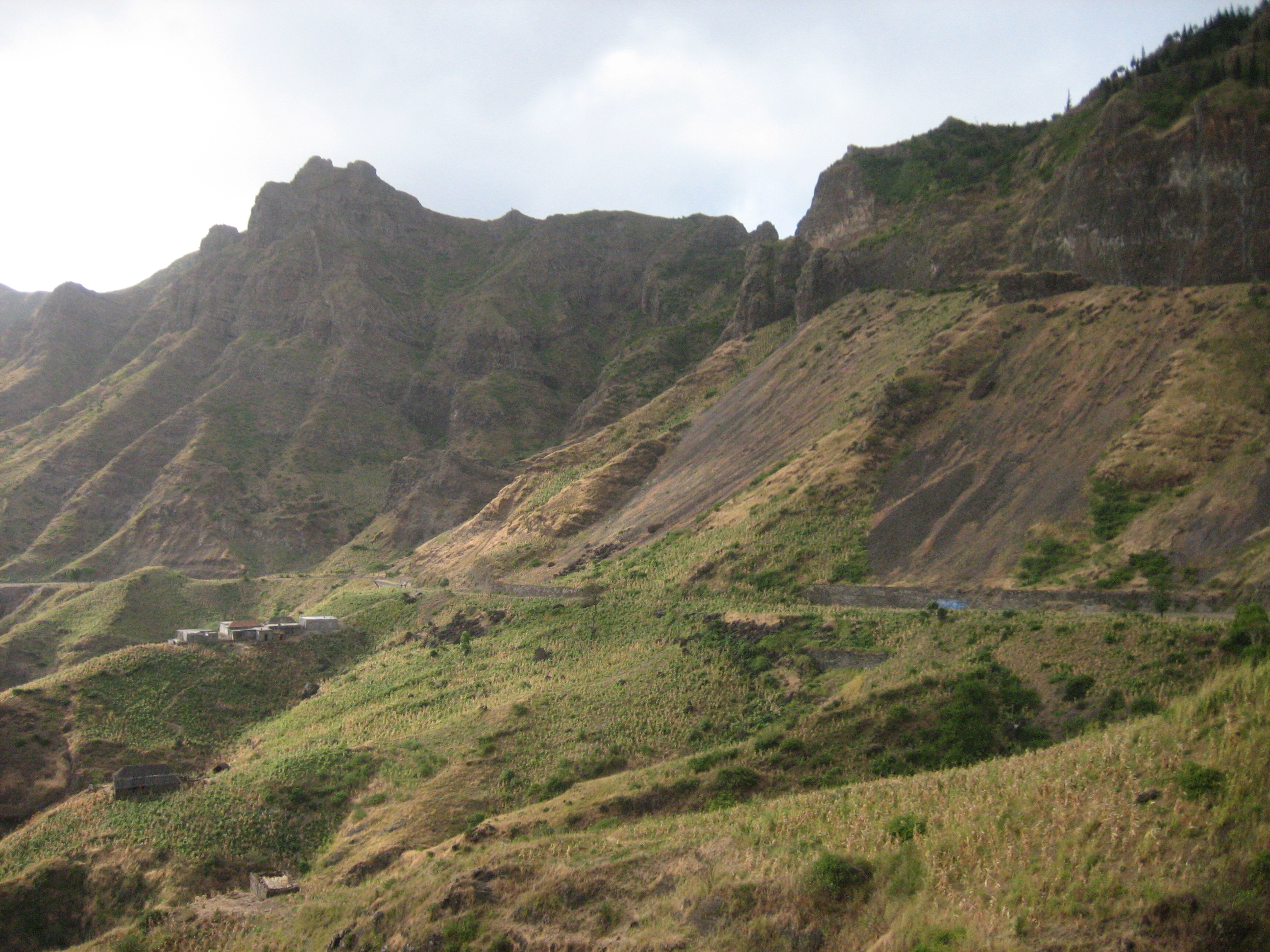
The Serra Malagueta mountain range in the northern part of the island of Santiago

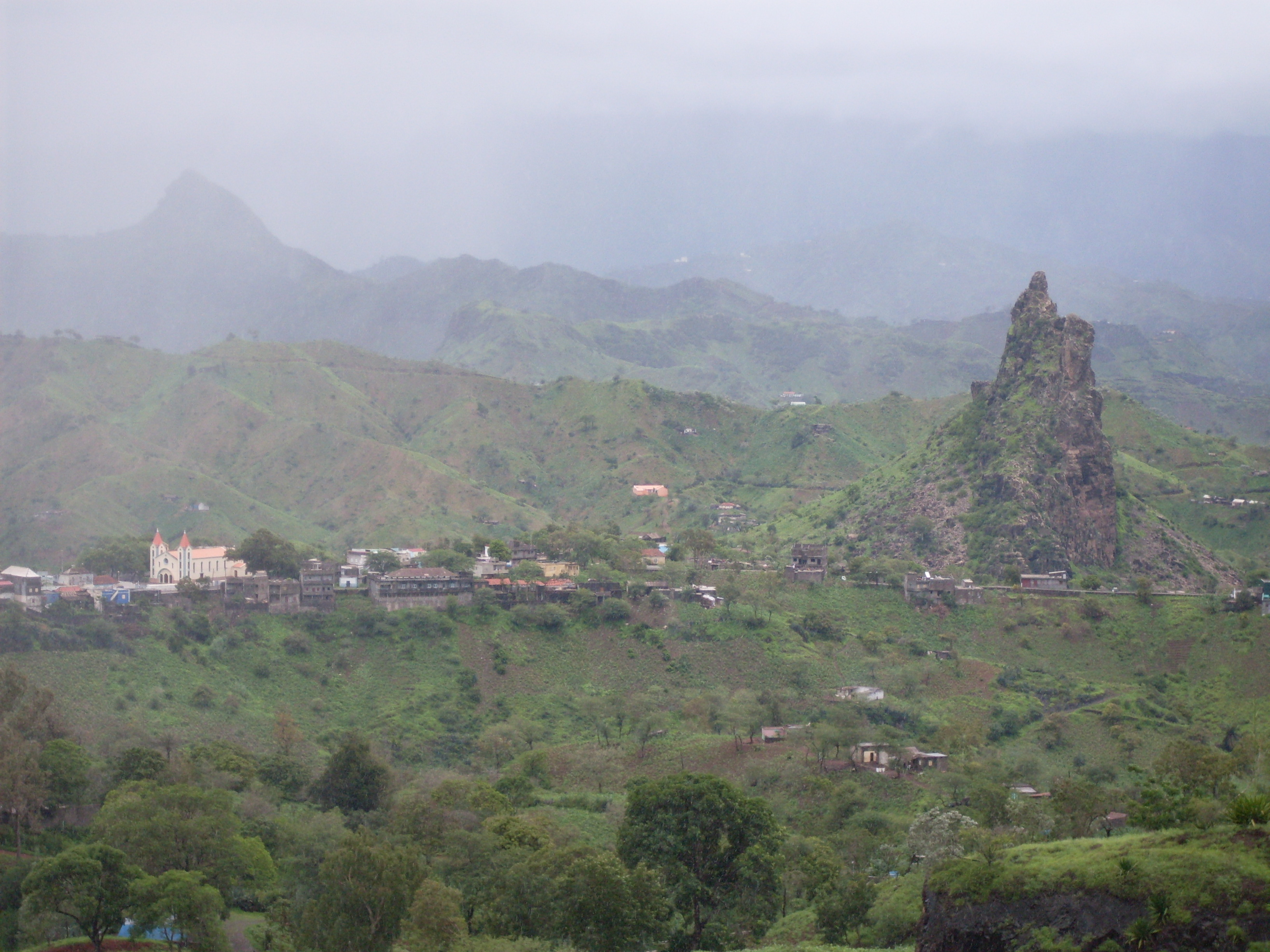
Santiago island. The wetter climate of the interior and the eastern coast contrasts with the dryer one in the south/southwest coast

The wildlife of Cape Verde is found across its archipelago of ten islands and three islets, albeit in smaller numbers of species than mainland Africa. Each volcanic island within the archipelago is unique, and each of them have parks under their jurisdiction, by decree promulgated by the Cape Verde government. Located just off the west coast of Africa, the total land area of the island nation is 4,564 square kilometres (1,762 sq mi).

With the exception of bats, there are no endemic mammal species. Historically, the archipelago was only accessible to creatures with the ability to fly, swim, or to be introduced by humans. The islands were first explored in 1456, but not actually settled until 1462; humans brought their livestock with them, including donkeys, pigs, cattle and goats—many of the latter are now so wild, they resemble mainland ibex, and are (more or less) considered endemic “by default”.

In the centuries since settlement began, more mainland species (such as the green vervet monkey, cats, dogs, mice, rats and rabbits) would make their way with waves of settlers. There are no snakes present on the archipelago, which has allowed for the proliferation of many other species of other herpetiles, such as geckos, frogs and lizards. The main predators of these reptiles and amphibians would be (besides each other) the various birds of prey and raptors present, including the Egyptian vulture, Eurasian buzzard, kestrel, osprey, peregrine falcon, and the rare Cape Verde kite. This kite species is currently threatened by extinction but may yet be observed on Boa Vista and Maio.

The flora consists of tropical dry forests, scrub land, Mediterranean-climate mountains, and rich coral reefs with abundant marine life. The islands are key migration points and breeding locations for numerous birds, plus the 20 different species of cetaceans—including pilot whales, bottlenose dolphins, and humpback whales—which come to feed and mate in the rich waters. Female green sea turtles come to lay their eggs on secluded beaches, likely the same ones they themselves hatched on.

Some of the wildlife species of Cape Verde are considered as endemic, evolving over millions of years of isolation; the grey-headed kingfisher (Halcyon leucocephala) survived here on insects in the absence of water in the lands of the islands.

In the process of development, many lands in the islands were converted to agricultural fields and several hundred varieties of herbaceous plant and tree species were introduced, resulting in depletion of the original vegetation. However, efforts are now underway at reforestation to improve the wildlife of Cape Verde, with reported planting of three million new trees every year (about 7000 per day), with pine, oak, sweet chestnut and acacia as the prominent varieties being planted. Cape Verde is also one of the world's top ten coral reef biodiversity hotspots.

== Geography ==
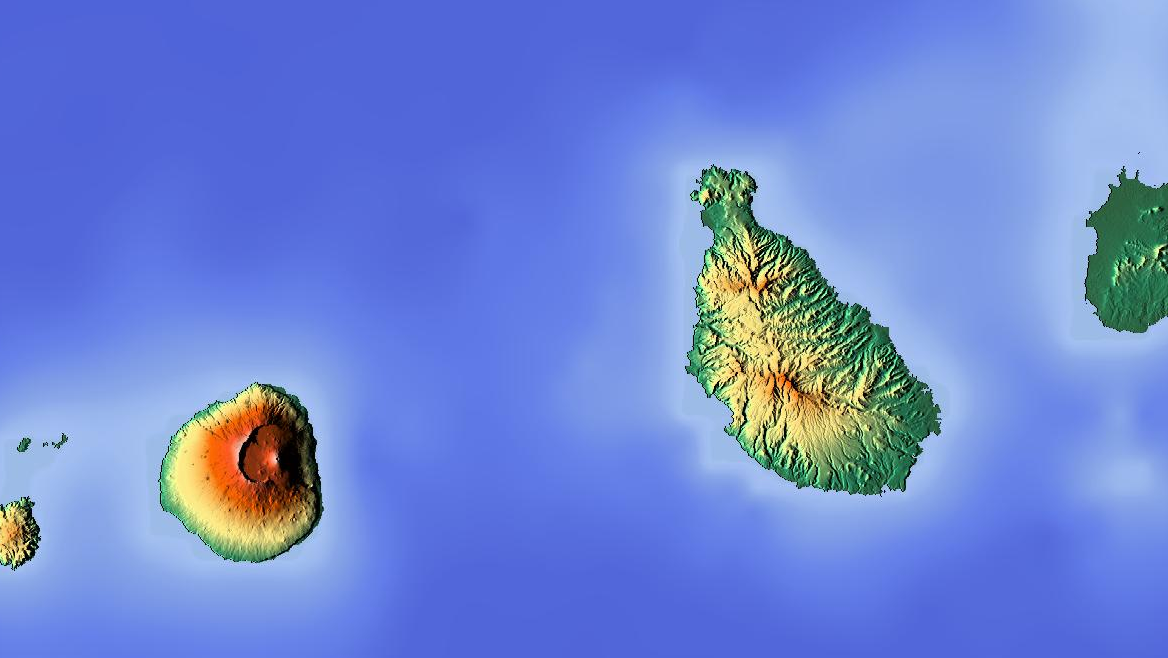
Map of Cape Verde

The Cape Verde archipelago is a cluster of 10 islands and three islets located in the eastern Atlantic Ocean at a distance of 560 kilometres (350 mi) off the coast of Senegal West Africa. They are volcanic in origin. Cape Verde is divided into two areas: the southern leeward islands known as the Sotavento Islands and the windward islands known as the Barlavento Islands in the north; Santo Antão, São Vicente, Santa Luzia, São Nicolau, Sal, and Boa Vista, and the Sotavento Islands of Maio, Santiago (the largest with an area of 991 km2), Fogo (with the only active volcano), and Brava. Nine of these islands which are inhabited have mountainous areas whereas the other islands have flat topography with sandy beaches. There are trees typical of both temperate and tropical climates, depending on elevation, which have created different types of flora and fauna. Given its geographical isolation, it exhibits a unique ecoregion with endemic plant and vertebrate species, particularly birds and reptiles. It is also inferred that arid climate with no sources of surface fresh water and geographic remoteness are the reasons for the islands limited wildlife diversity. As of 2003, there were 48 protected areas covering 0.3% of the islands land mass.

The Cape Verde islands are a very degraded area. Due to proximity to the Sahara, most of the Cape Verde islands are dry, but on islands with high mountains and farther away from the coast, the humidity is much higher, giving a rainforest habitat that is very degraded by the strong human presence. Northeastern slopes of high mountains often receive a lot of rain while Southwest slopes are much drier. This umbria areas are identified with cool and moisture. Some islands, as Santiago with steep mountains, are covered with vegetation where the dense moisture condenses and soaks the plants, rocks, soil, logs, and moss.

The laurel forest is a type of cloud forest that has developed on mountains, where the dense moisture from the sea or ocean, is precipitated by the action of the relief. The terrain forces up wet and warm air masses, which cool and decreases the dew point, causing moisture to condense and fall as rain or fog. This creates a habitat that is cool, saturating air and soil with moisture.

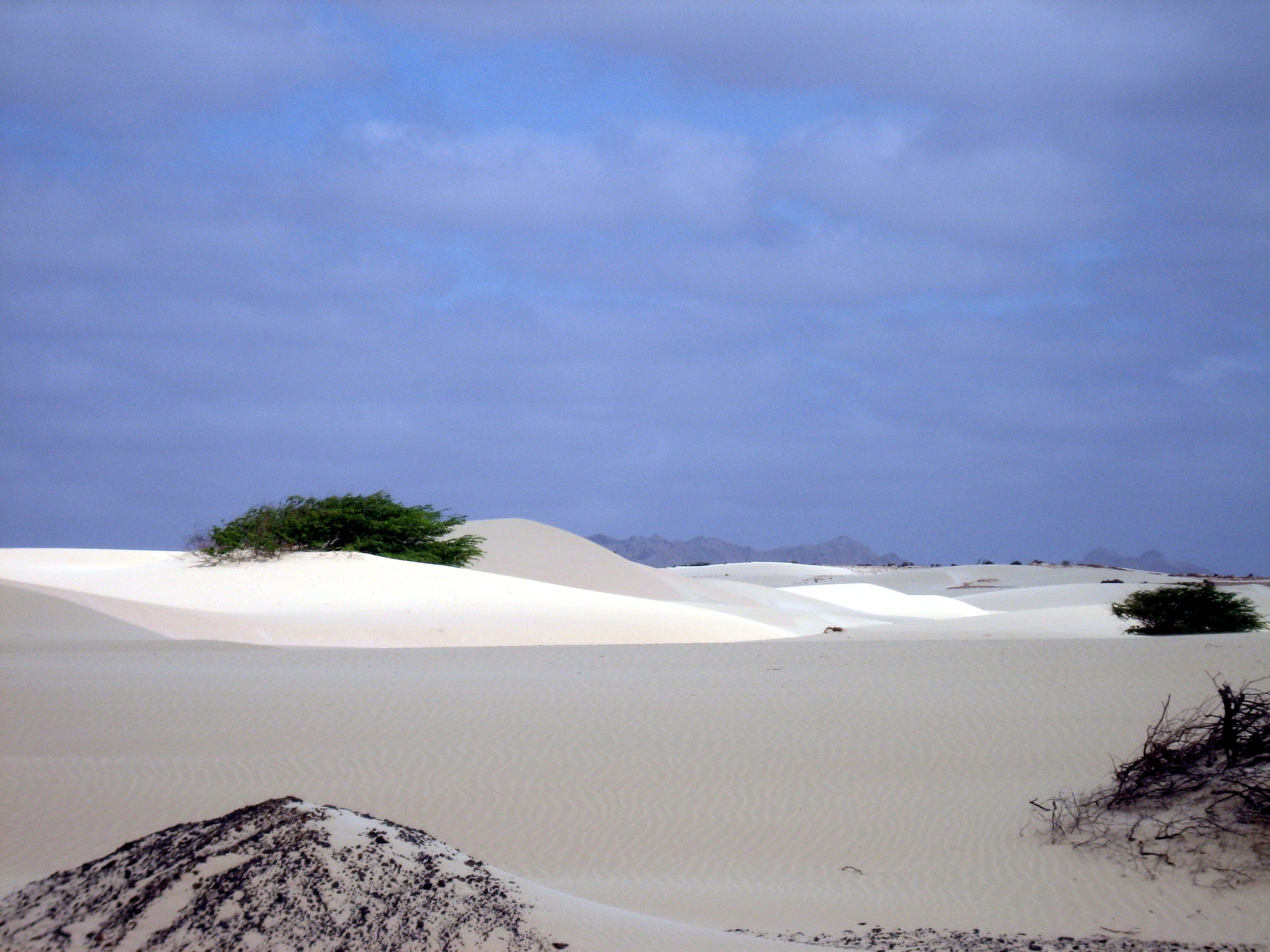
The sand desert Viana on the island of Boa Vista, surrounded by rock desert

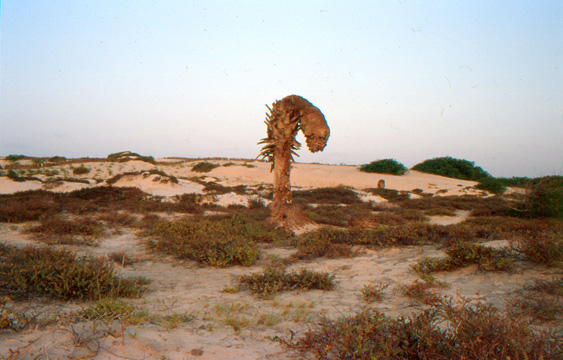
Boa Vista landscape

=== Protected areas ===
The protected areas declared under the Official Gazette of Cape Verde, in February 2003 are:

In Santo Antão Island the protected areas are Moroços – Natural Park, Cova/Ribeira Paúl/Torre – Natural Park, Cruzinha – Natural Reserve, Pombas – Protected Landscape and Tope de Coroa – Natural Park.

São Vicente Island has the Monte Verde – Natural Park.

Branco and Raso Islets – Integrated Reserve is the natural reserve in Santa Luzia Island.

São Nicolau Island has Monte Gordo Natural Park and Monte do Alto das Cabaças Natural Reserve.

Sal Island has 11 protected areas namely, the Salinas de Pedra Lume and Cagarral – Protected Landscape, the Monte Grande – Protected Landscape, the Rabo de Junco – Natural Reserve, the Baía da Murdeira – Natural (Marine) Reserve, the Costa da Fragata – Natural Reserve, the Serra Negra – Natural Reserve, the Buracona-Ragona – Protected Landscape, the Salinas de Santa Maria – Protected Landscape, the Morrinho do Filho –Natural Monument, the Ponta do Sino – Natural Reserve, the Morrinho do Açucar – Natural Monument.

In Maio Island protected are the Terras Salgadas – Natural Reserve, Casas Velhas – Natural Reserve, Barareiro e Figueira – Natural Park, Lagoa Cimidor – Natural Reserve, Praia do Morro – Natural Reserve, Salinas de Porto Inglês – Protected Landscape, Monte Penoso e Monte Branco – Protected Landscape and Monte Santo António – Protected Landscape.

Boa Vista Island has the largest number of parks and natural monuments. These are: The Boa Esperança – Natural Reserve; the Ilhéu de Baluarte – Integrated Natural Reserve, the Ilhéu dos Pássaros – Integrated Natural Reserve, the Ilhéu de Curral Velho – Integrated Natural Reserve, the Ponta do Sol – Natural Reserve, the Tartaruga – Natural Reserve, the Natural Park do Norte – Natural Park, the Monte Caçador e Pico Forçado – Protected Landscape; the Morro de Areia – Natural Reserve; the Curral Velho – Protected Landscape; the Monte Santo António –Natural Monument; the Ilhéu de Sal-Rei – Natural Monument; the Monte Estância – Natural Monument; and the Rocha Estância – Natural Monument.

The Santiago Island has two preserved areas in the Serra da Malagueta – Natural Park and the Serra Pico de Antónia – Natural Park.

The Fogo Island has Bordeira, Chã das Caldeiras e Pico Novo Natural Park.

The Rombo Islets have an Integrated Reserve.

With a view to preserve the marine ecosystems and develop fisheries pragmatically, the action initiated included creation of Marine reserves: Santa Luzia Island, and the Islets Raso and Branco, Boavista, Sal and Maio Islands; and Conservation of Cape Verde Endangered Marine Species Project.

== Flora ==
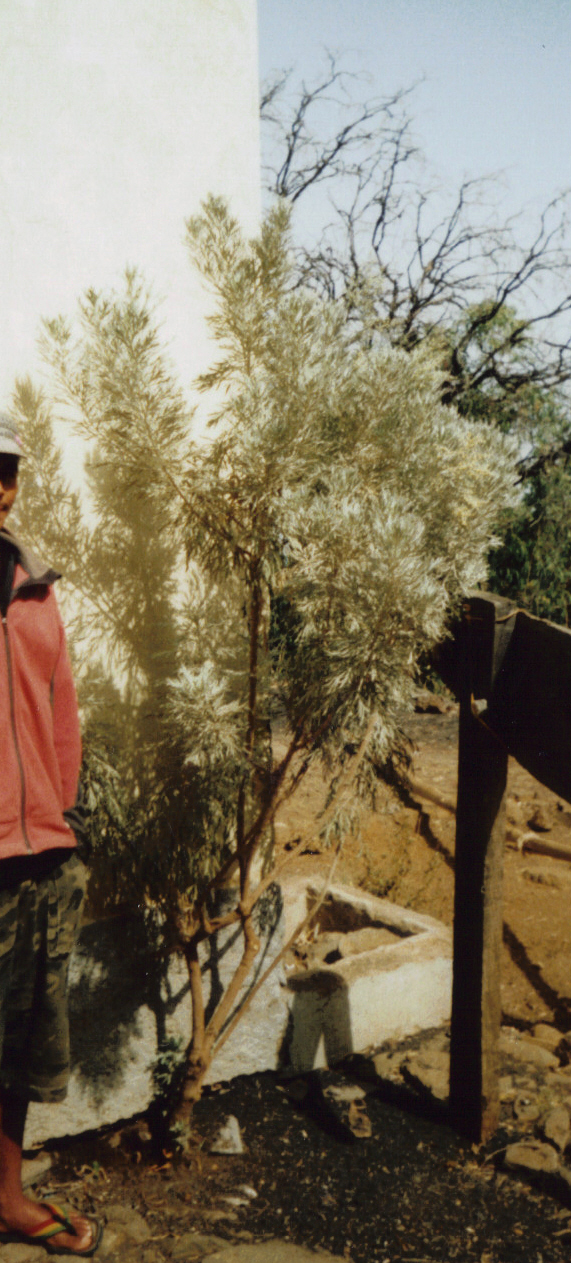
Losma (Artemisia gorgonum), an endemic plant of Fogo Island

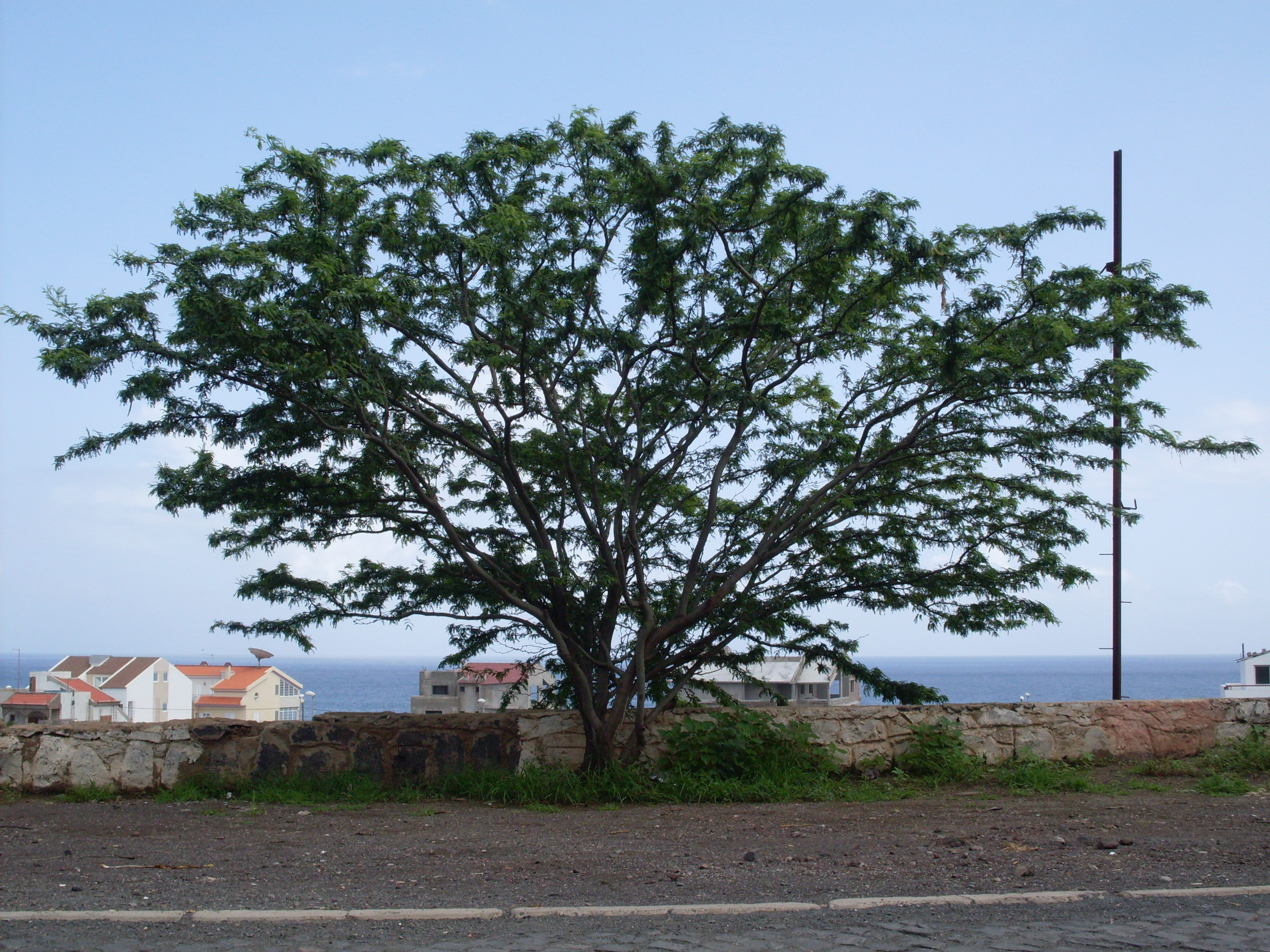
Acacia tree

Historically, Cape Verde was probably not rich with greenery, although the evidence of the situation in earlier times is severely lacking. When Cape Verde was first discovered and colonized by the Portuguese in the 15th century, the wildlife consisted mainly of dry forests and scrub habitat, which underwent a sea change under the influence of the inhabitants of this then isolated and uninhabited group of islands. The endemic flora and fauna of the islands were disturbed and have now remained confined mostly in the mountain peaks, steep slopes and other inaccessible areas.

Vegetation in the islands is basically of the savannah or steppe type. There are trees typical of both temperate and tropical climates, depending on elevation. The flatter parts of the islands sustain semi-desert plants while the higher lands have arid shrubland. The leeward slopes tend to contain desert, with a very sparse shrub cover, mostly thorny or toxic. A number of xerophilous plants grow in the brackish subsoil of Maio, Sal, and Boa Vista.

There are 664 listed plant species, which include two threatened species. Over 80 vascular plant taxa are reported to be endemic to Cape Verde; these include, Aeonium gorgoneum, Campanula bravensis (bellflower), Nauplius smithii, Artemisia gorgonum (sagebrush), Sideroxylon marginatum, Lotus jacobaeus, Lavandula rotundifolia, Cynanchum daltonii, Euphorbia tuckeyana, Polycarpaea gayi and Erysimum caboverdeanum (wallflower). Several trees are indigenous such as the blue-green flat-topped dragon tree Dracaena draco, Tamarix senegalensis, Phoenix atlantica (tamareira), in the lagoons and deserts of Boavista, the ironwood tree and a species of fig tree and Faidherbia albida (formerly known as Acacia albida and locally called simply "acácia"). As a result of extensive tree planting since 1975, there are pine trees, oaks and sweet chestnuts on the cool peaks of Santo Antao, eucalyptus on the heights of Fogo, and forests of acacia on Maio.

== Fauna ==
The island has five mammals out of which three are threatened, 75 species of birds including 2 threatened species, 19 reptiles, 132 varieties of fish species including one threatened species. However, the islands do not have snakes and large mammals.

=== Mammals ===
The only indigenous mammal found in the island is the grey long-eared bat (Plecotus austriacus). Bat species on the islands account for about 20% of all mammals. Of particular note are those of the family Vespertilionidae: Savi's pipistrelle (Hypsugo savii) and Kuhl's pipistrelle (Pipistrellus kuhlii) in addition to the grey long-eared bat. Feral goats are found on Fogo, the descendants of domestic goats introduced by the Portuguese. Rodent populations were introduced by the Portuguese from early ships which visited the islands. Monkeys are also present in Cape Verde, hailing from the African continent. The slender mongoose (Galerella sanguinea) has also been introduced.

=== Birds ===
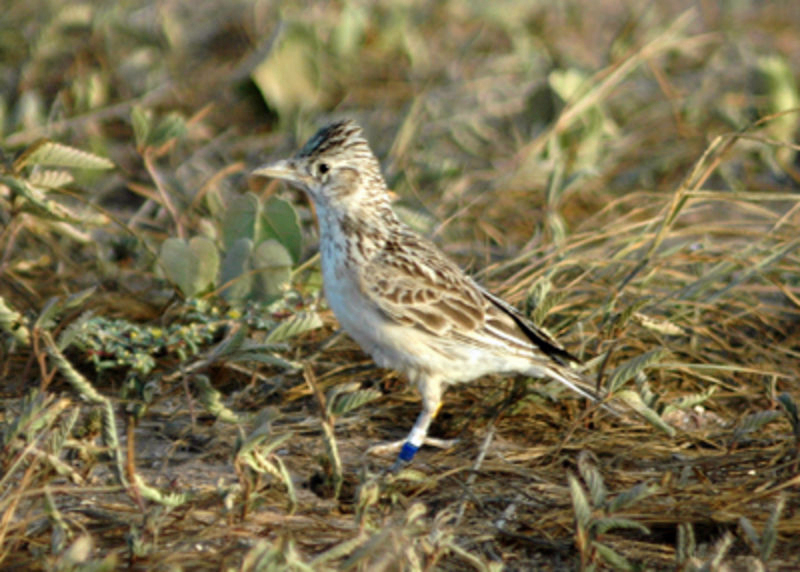
Male colour-ringed Raso lark (Alauda razae)

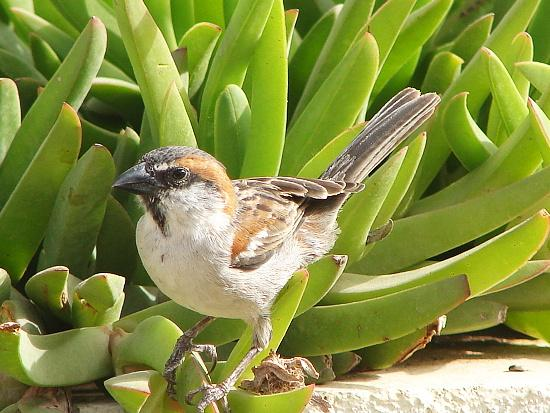
Male Iago sparrow at Sal Island

Cape Verde has many species of endemic birds, which are observed by keen ornithologists and bird watchers on the islands. 130 migrant birds are reported to visit the islands, out of which over 40 nest there. The seabirds which breed on the island are: Fea's petrel, magnificent frigatebird and red-billed tropicbird. Four species of birds, (Alexander's swift, the Raso lark, the Cape Verde swamp-warbler and the Iago sparrow) are also endemic here, while the Cape Verde shearwater is a breeding endemic. The endemic and endangered Bourne's heron is sometimes considered a full species. Also common are the greater flamingo and the Egyptian vulture. There is also an extinct species of quail Coturnix centensis from the Holocene of São Vicente Island.

=== Terrestrial reptiles ===
Lizards reported on the islands are 15 species including 12 endemic species, such as the now extinct Cape Verde giant skink (Chioninia coctei) on Ilhéu Raso, giant gecko (Tarentola gigas) on Raso and Branco islands, Mabuya skinks (6 species), Hemidactylus (3 species) and Tarentola geckos (11 species).

An extinct undescribed species of small Centrochelys tortoise was reportedly present on São Vicente before human settlement.

=== Invertebrates ===
Cape Verde has a reported 58 endemic species of spider, including Wesolowskana lymphatica (jumping spider), and Hottentotta caboverdensis, a parthenogenetic scorpion. It has a reported 15 endemic genera and 369 endemic species of insects. Of note are Ceylalictus capverdensis (bee), Thyreus denolii (cuckoo bee), Thyreus batelkai (cuckoo bee), Thyreus schwarzi (cuckoo bee), Thyreus aistleitneri (cuckoo bee), Chiasmognathus batelkai (cuckoo bee), Monomorium boltoni (ant), Scopula paneliusi (geometrid moth) and Serranegra petrophila, a true bug in the family Lygaeidae There also are endemic marine species, including molluscs such as Favartia burnayi, Nassarius caboverdensis, Prunum sauliae, the cone shell Conus josephinae and the Cape Verde spiny lobster (Palinurus charlestoni).

=== Marine life ===
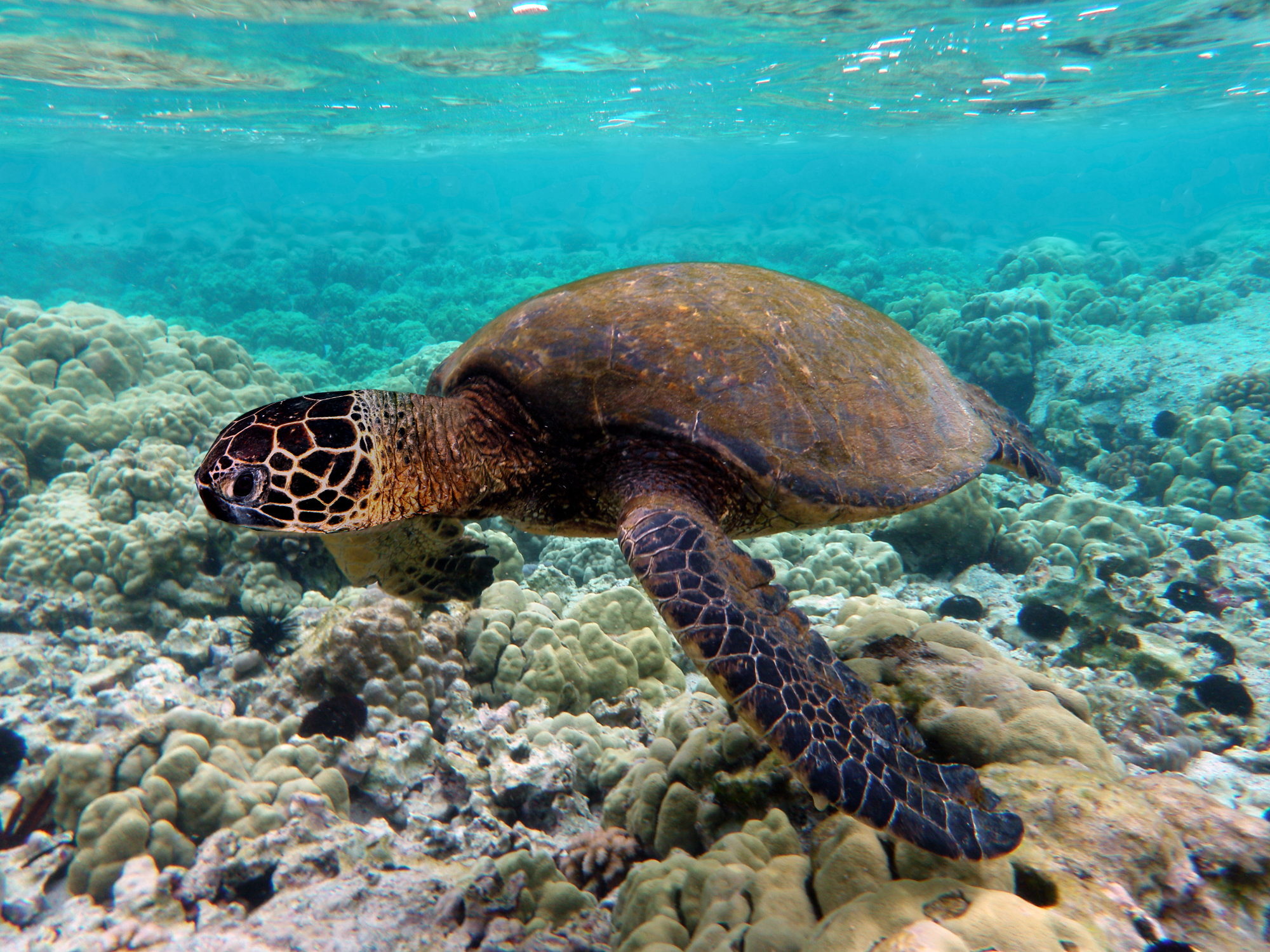
Green sea turtle

The tropical marine environment of the Cape Verde islands of Boavista, Sal and Maio is reported to have a high diversity of sea life. Boavista is part of the Macaronesia Wetlands. Coral reefs are also found extensively in Cape Verde, considered as one of the "world's ten most important coral reefs". There is a large number of endemic marine gastropods (sea snails and sea slugs) on the coasts of Cape Verde.

Marine species reported are bridled dolphin, Atlantic spotted dolphin, long-beaked common dolphin, blue whale, humpback whale, Blainville's beaked whale, common porpoise, barracuda, lemon shark, moray eels and marine turtles (5 species). Turtles migrate across the Atlantic to breed from May to October. The most prominent species is the endangered loggerhead sea turtle (Caretta caretta). Other species of turtle are the hawksbill sea turtle (Eretmochelys imbricate) which is critically endangered; the green sea turtle (Chelonia mydas), endangered; leatherback sea turtle (Dermochelys coriacea) and olive ridley sea turtle (Lepidochelys olivacea). Hunting of sea turtles remains prevalent per an UNEP report, however turtle conservation measures began in 2008.

Eighteen species of whales and dolphins have been recorded in the waters of the Cape Verde archipelago. The area is cited as one of two known breeding grounds for the humpback whale (Megaptera novaeangliae) of the Northern Hemisphere. Humpback whales migrate annually from the North Sea to winter around Cape Verde from January to mid-May. The humpback whale population became limited due to severe overfishing during the 19th century and, although the total North Atlantic population of humpbacks had rebounded to more than 10,000 individuals by 1993, the Cape Verde population remained uncertain as of 2009.

== Threats and legal redress ==
The status of biological resources of Cape Verde, in the process of degradation, was recognized in 1996 which prompted action in 2005 with several legal instruments that were introduced by the government of Cape Verde. In spite of all the legislation, the level of degradation reported in the Red List of Threatened Species was "26% for angiosperms, over 40% of bryophytes, over 65% of pteridophytes and over 29% of lichens are threatened; furthermore, over 47% of birds, 25% of terrestrial reptiles, 64% of coleopterous, over 57% of arachnids and over 59% of terrestrial mollusks." The number of Alauda razae (calhandra-do-Ilhéu-Raso) and Himantopus himantopus (perna-longa) has still shown a declining trend.

Further, with a view to preserve the marine ecosystems and develop fisheries pragmatically the action initiated included creation of Marine reserves: Santa Luzia Island, and the Islets Raso and Branco, Boavista, Sal and Maio Islands; and Conservation of Cape Verde Endangered Marine Species Project.

Organizations

Institutions and organizations involved with the preservation and conservation of the biodiversity of Cape Verde are: The Directorate General of Agriculture, Forest and Livestock Production, the Institute for the Development of Fisheries (INDP), the University of Cape Verde's National Institute of Agricultural Research and Development (INIDA) and Project Biodiversity.

Noting that the exclusive biological species of Cape Verde are not represented in any germplasm banks across the world and that its fauna and flora of Cape Verde are extremely vulnerable to climate adversities with the natural regenerative conditions considered as poor, INIDA has established "a collection of biological resources for ex situ conservation as a means of backing in-situ conservation of species threatened in some way, as they may be introduced in the wild as needs be, in sites where they are best adapted, through a finely tuned reintroduction program."

== See also ==
- Overfishing in West Africa
