= Cape Verde Islands dry forests =

Ecoregion off West Africa

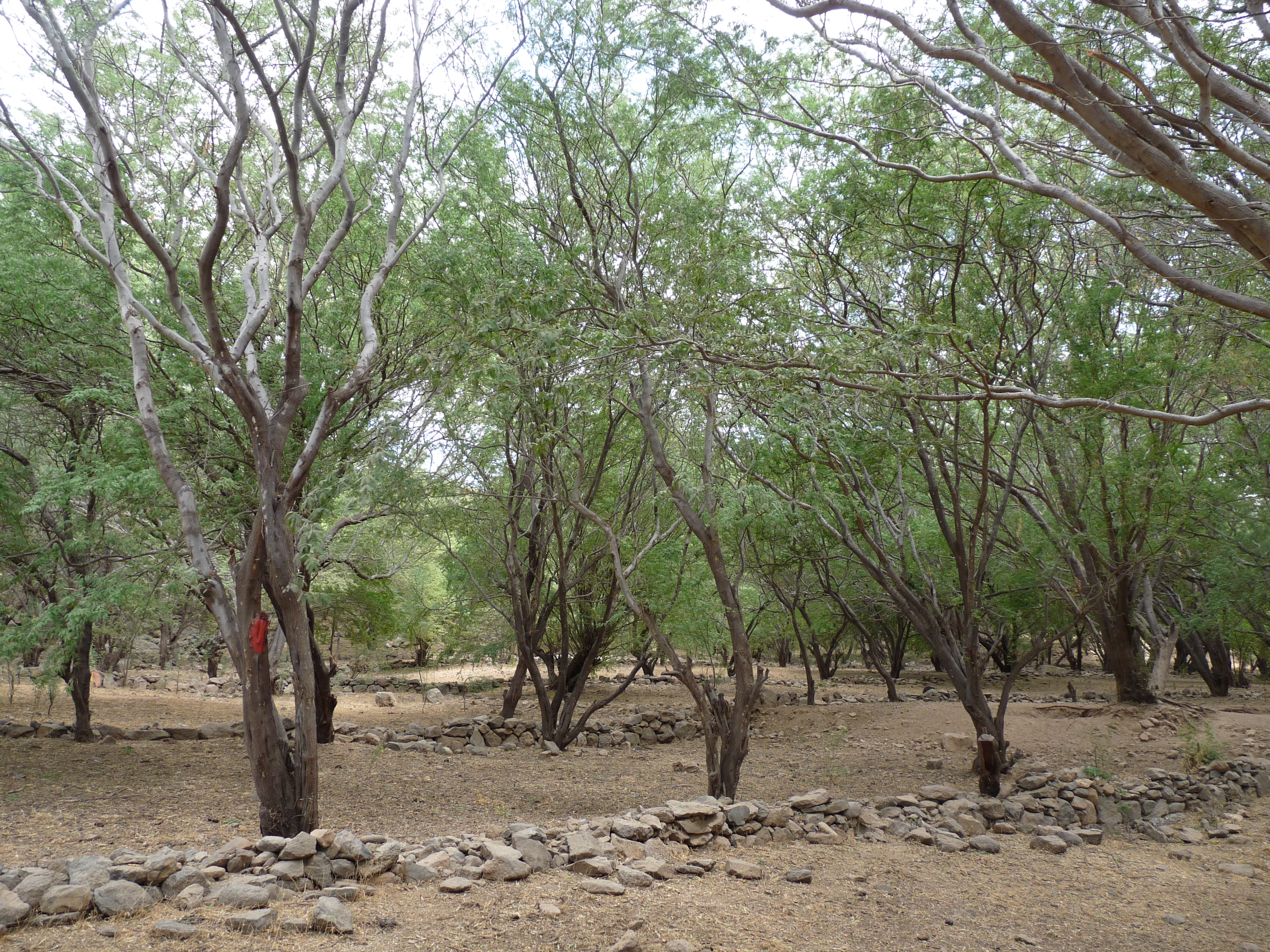
- Acacia woodland on Santiago Island, Cabo Verde

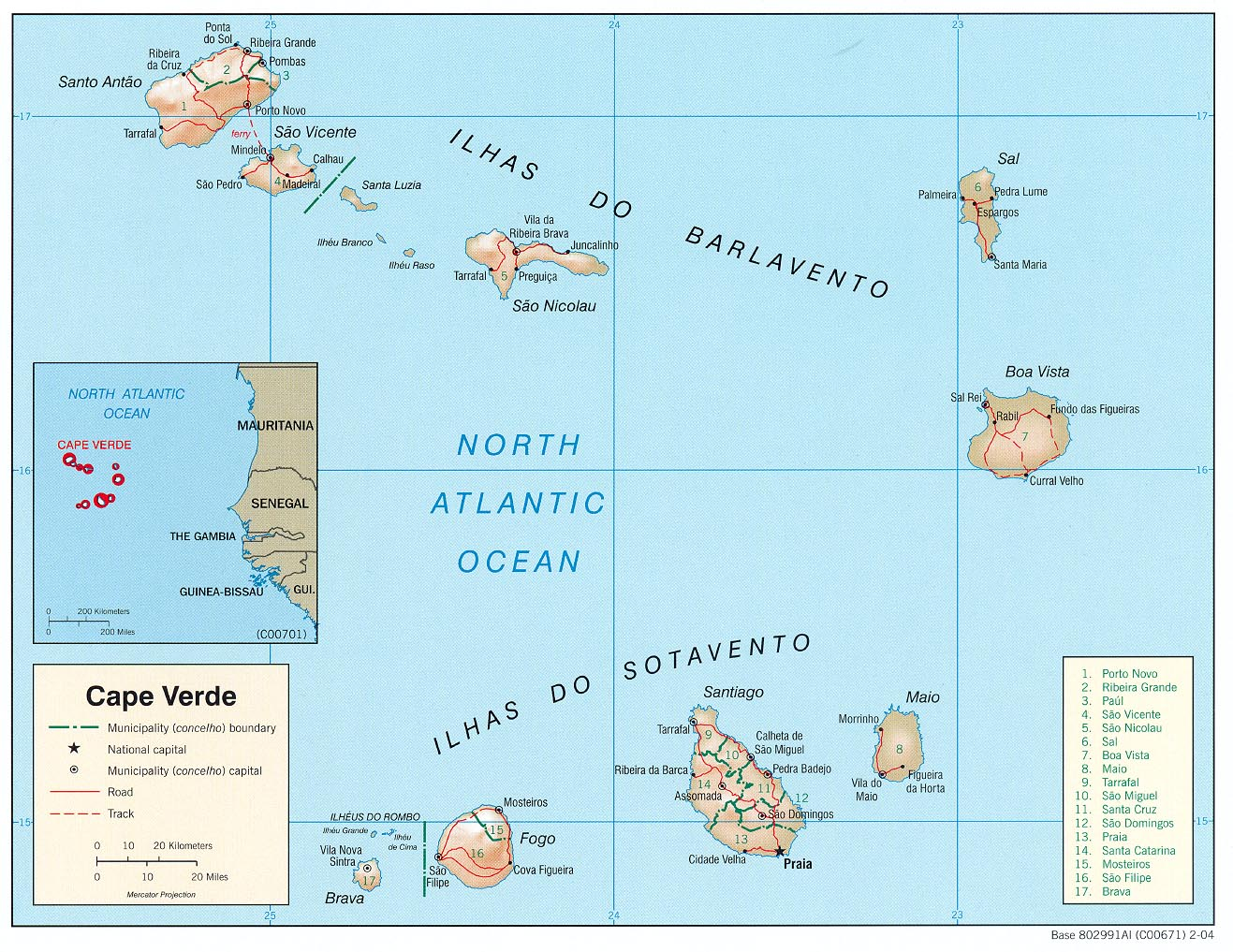
- Map of the Cape Verde Islands

Ecology
- Realm: Afrotropical
- Biome: tropical and subtropical dry broadleaf forests

Geography
- Area: 3,645 km^{2} (1,407 sq mi)
- Country: Cabo Verde

Conservation
- Conservation status: critical/endangered
- Protected: 108 km² (3%)

The Cape Verde Islands dry forests is a tropical and subtropical dry broadleaf forests ecoregion in the Cape Verde Islands, which constitute the country of Cabo Verde. The islands lie off the western coast of Africa.

== Geography ==
The ecoregion covers an area of 3,645 km^{2}, and covers the archipelago's entire land area.

The archipelago consists of ten islands and five islets, divided into the windward (Barlavento) and leeward (Sotavento) groups. The six islands in the Barlavento group are Santo Antão (779 km^{2}), São Vicente (227 km^{2}), Santa Luzia (34 km^{2}), São Nicolau (379 km^{2}), Sal (216 km^{2}), and Boa Vista (620 km^{2}). The four islands in the Sotavento group are Maio (269 km^{2}), Santiago (991 km^{2}), Fogo (476 km^{2}), and Brava (66 km^{2}). All but Santa Luzia are inhabited. Santiago is the largest island, and is home to half the country's population and its capital, Praia.

The archipelago is volcanic in origin. Several of the islands are mountainous, and summits over 1000 meters elevation are found on Fogo (Pico do Fogo, 2,829 m), Santo Antão (Tope de Coroa, 1,979 m), Santiago (Pico de Antónia, 1,392 m), and São Nicolau (Monte Gordo, 1,312 m). Three islands – Sal, Boa Vista, and Maio – are low and dry, and lack reliable water supplies.

The Cape Verde islands are part of Macaronesia, a group of archipelagoes in the Atlantic Ocean which share similarities in climate and ecology.

== Climate ==
The Cape Verde Islands have a tropical climate. Most rainfall is during the warm August and November wet season. The dry season extends from December to July.

Higher islands create orographic precipitation and receive higher rainfall.

== Flora ==
The islands' original flora is not well understood, but likely included savanna or steppe at lower elevations, with semi-desert plants on the lower and drier portions of the archipelago. The higher islands with more precipitation may have supported dry monsoon woodlands or forests. The more humid areas of the islands have been converted to agriculture, and native woodland vegetation persists in isolated enclaves on steep slopes.

There are 750 species of vascular plants on the islands. The majority have been introduced since the islands were settled. 33 pteridophyte species and 240 flowering plants are thought to be native. There are many endemic species among the natives, including the fern Dryopteris gorgonea and 85 flowering plant species from 42 genera, including the endemic genus Tornabenea.

Native tree species include the dragon's blood tree (Dracaena caboverdeana), the fig trees Ficus sycomorus ssp. gnaphalocarpa and Ficus sur, the tamarisk Tamarix senegalensis, and the endemic trees marmulan (Sideroxylon marginatum) and Cape Verde Island date palm or tamareira (Phoenix atlantica). Most of the native trees are threatened by destruction of their habitat.

After Portuguese colonization in the 15th century, the clearing of land for agriculture and grazing by goats reduced and degraded the native vegetation and tree cover, which caused extensive soil erosion. Portuguese colonial authorities began to establish forest plantations in the early 20th century to reduce soil erosion and restore watersheds. Between 1928 and 1975, 30 km^{2} were afforested with non-native pines, cypresses, and eucalyptus, mostly on Santo Antão, Fogo, and São Nicolau. The oldest plantations in the highlands of Santo Antão and São Vicente have now grown into dense forests. Tree planting continued after independence in 1975, and recent afforestation projects have focused on the drier areas of Santiago, Maio, and Brava islands. The species used in these areas include Prosopis juliflora, Acacia spp., and Ziziphus mauritiana, which are adapted to the drier conditions. In 2013, it was estimated that 97 km^{2} of the islands were covered in forest, 22 km^{2} in woodland, and 225 km^{2} in tree plantations.

== Fauna ==
The Cape Verde Islands are home to five endemic bird species. The Iago sparrow (Passer iagoensis) and Cape Verde swift (Apus alexandri) are found on most of the islands. The endangered Raso lark (Alauda razae) is limited to uninhabited Raso Island, and the Cape Verde warbler (Acrocephalus brevipennis) is found only on Santiago Island. The Cape Verde buzzard (Buteo bannermanni) is also endemic to the islands. Bourne's heron or Cape Verde heron (Ardea purpurea bournei) is an endangered subspecies of heron endemic to the islands, with 40 birds living on Santiago Island.

The islands are an important nesting area for seabirds. Two species breed only in the Cape Verde Islands. The Cape Verde shearwater (Calonectris edwardsii) breeds in February and March, principally on the islands of Brava, Branco and Raso in February and March Fea's petrel (Pterodroma feae) breeds on Fogo, Santo Antão, São Nicolau and Santiago in the spring and autumn. The islands are also important breeding areas for the magnificent frigatebird (Fregata magnificens), and for a subspecies of red-billed tropicbird (Phaethon aethereus mesonauta ).

Prior to colonization, the only mammals on the islands were bats. Several species have since been introduced to the islands, including sheep, goats, and cattle, green monkey (Chlorocebus sabaeus), slender mongoose (Galerella sanguinea), European rabbit (Oryctolagus cuniculus), black rat (Rattus rattus) and brown rat (Rattus norvegicus).

There are 22 native species of lizards on the Cape Verde Islands, all of which are endemic – three geckos in genus Hemidactylus, 12 wall geckos of genus Tarentola, and seven skinks in genus Chioninia. There are three non-native reptiles living on the island. Endemic species include the Cape Verde giant skink (Chioninia coctei) on Raso and Branco islands, and the Giant wall gecko (Tarentola gigas) found on São Nicolau, Raso and Branco islands.

== Protected areas ==
108 km^{2}, or 3%, of the ecoregion is in protected areas. Another 1% of the ecoregion is forested but unprotected.
