= Santa Luzia, Cape Verde =

Island of Cape Verde

Santa Luzia
- Terrain map of Santa Luzia

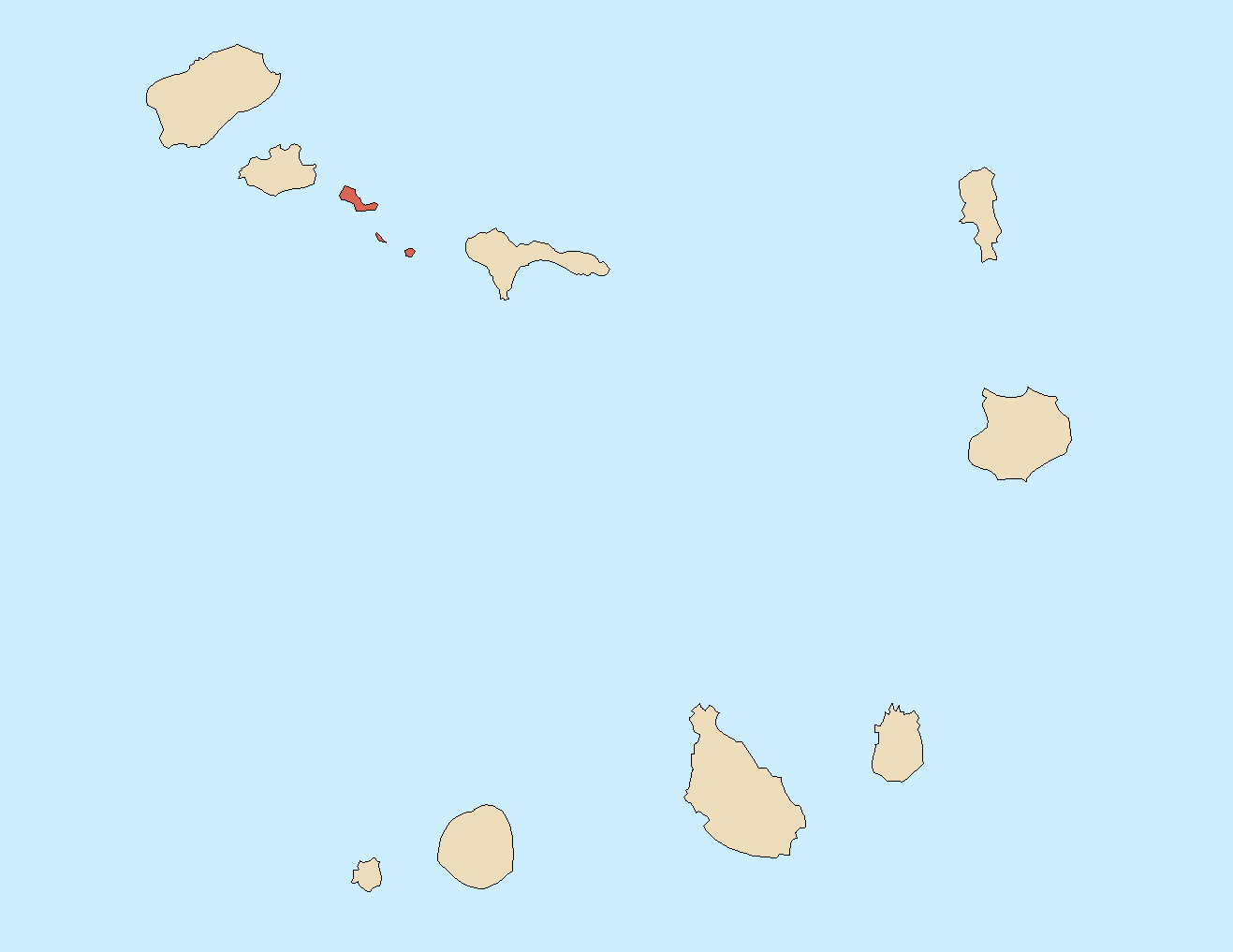

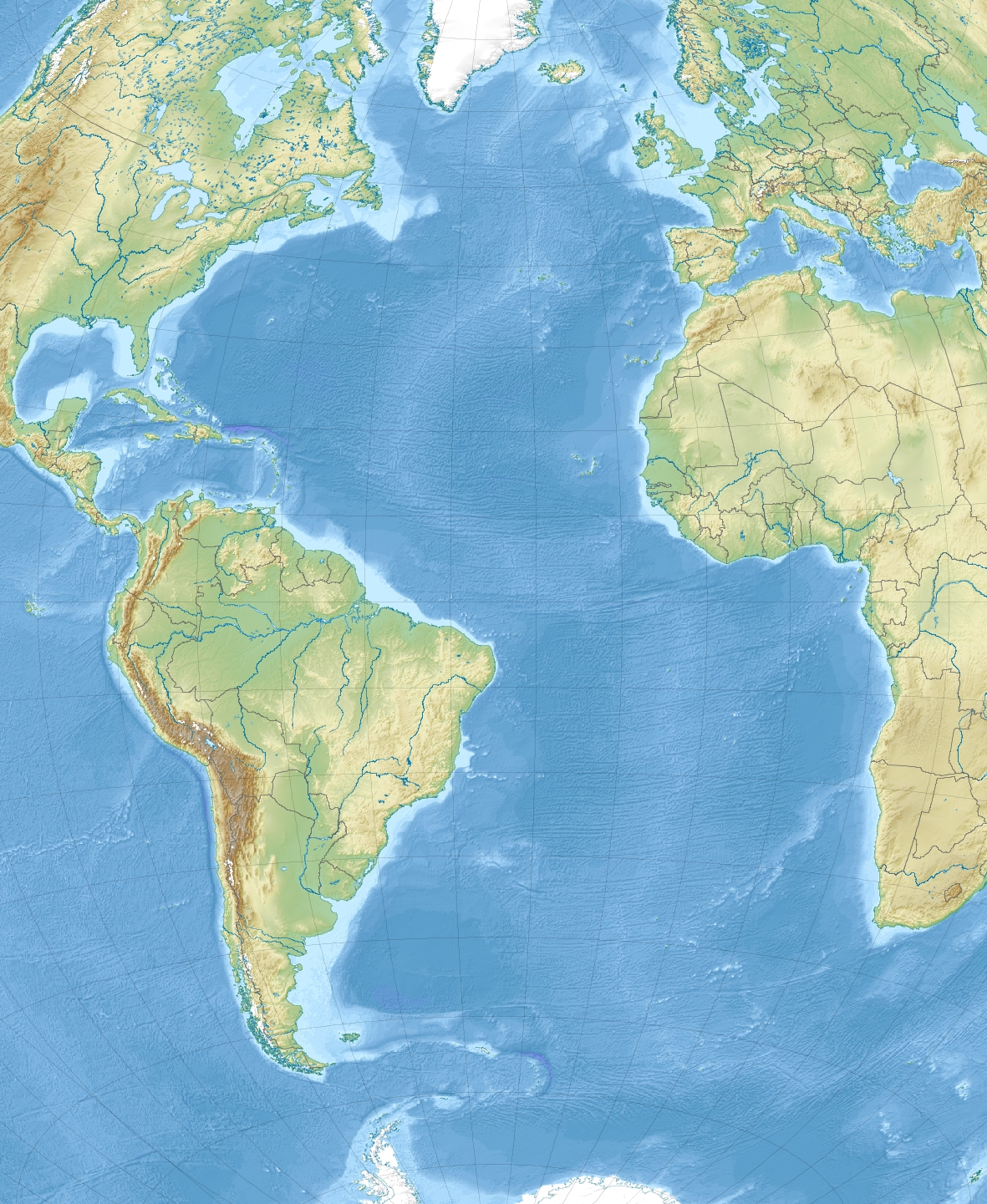
- Location within Cape Verde Location within Atlantic Ocean

Geography
- Location: Atlantic Ocean
- Coordinates: 16°45′41″N 24°44′38″W
- Archipelago: Cape Verde
- Area: 34.2 km^{2} (13.2 sq mi)
- Length: 12.4 km (7.71 mi)
- Width: 5.3 km (3.29 mi)
- Highest elevation: 395 m (1296 ft)
- Highest point: Topona

Administration
- Cape Verde

Demographics
- Population: 0
- Pop. density: 0/km^{2} (0/sq mi)

Santa Luzia is an island of the Barlavento archipelago in Cape Verde (officially: Cabo Verde), located between São Nicolau and São Vicente.

The island, along with the islets Branco and Raso, was designated the Santa Luzia Nature Reserve in 1990 and the 11,000 hectares (27,000 acres) Santa Luzia Marine Protected Area (MPA). All three are on the tentative list of UNESCO's List of World Heritage Sites.

Although the island has never had permanent long-term human inhabitants, it is inhabited by various animals, including sea turtles and a variety of birds.

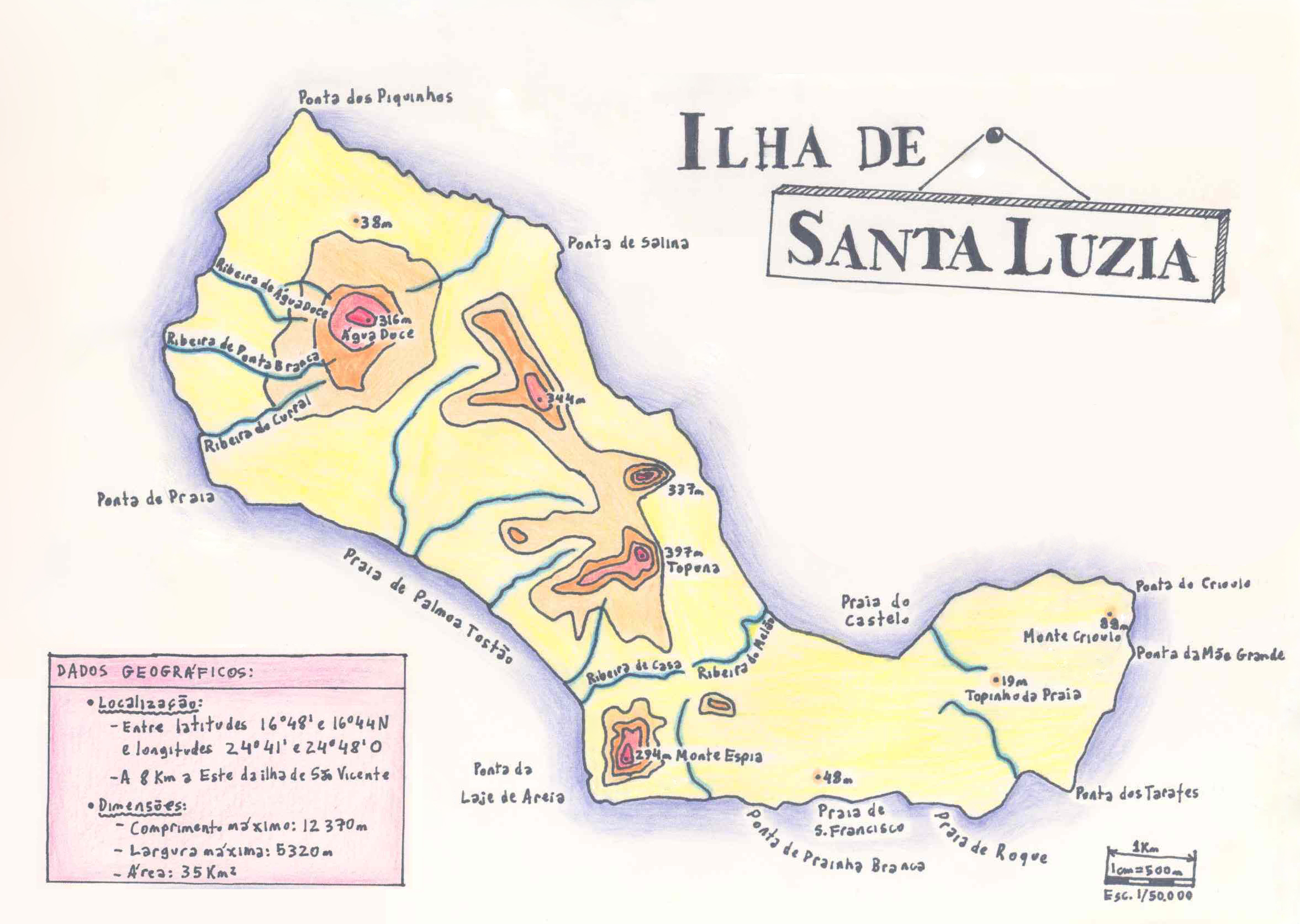
Geographical features of the island

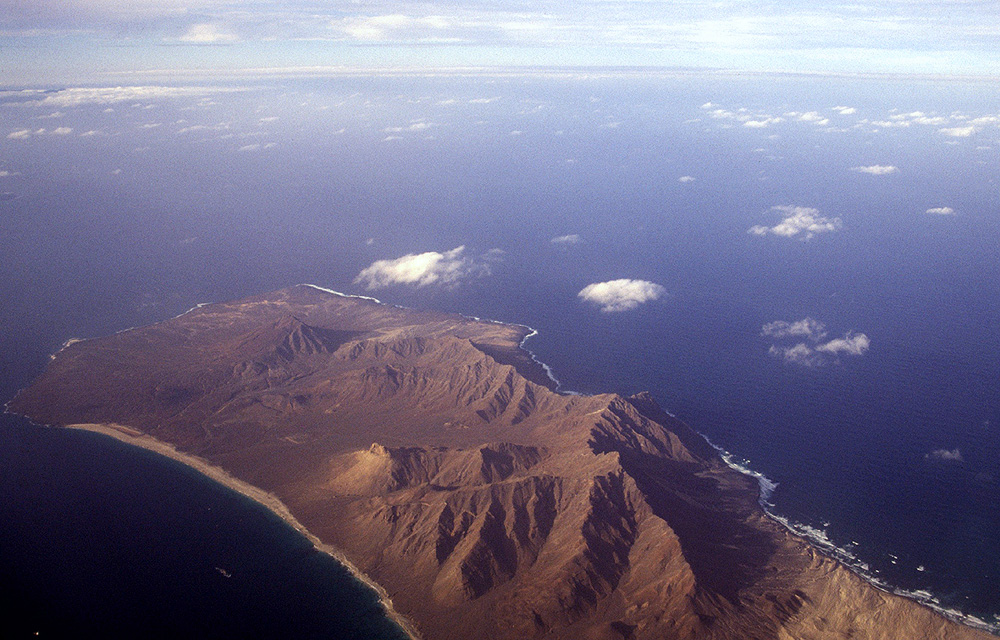
Santa Luzia Island (Cabo Verde), aerial view of the northern portion in 1999

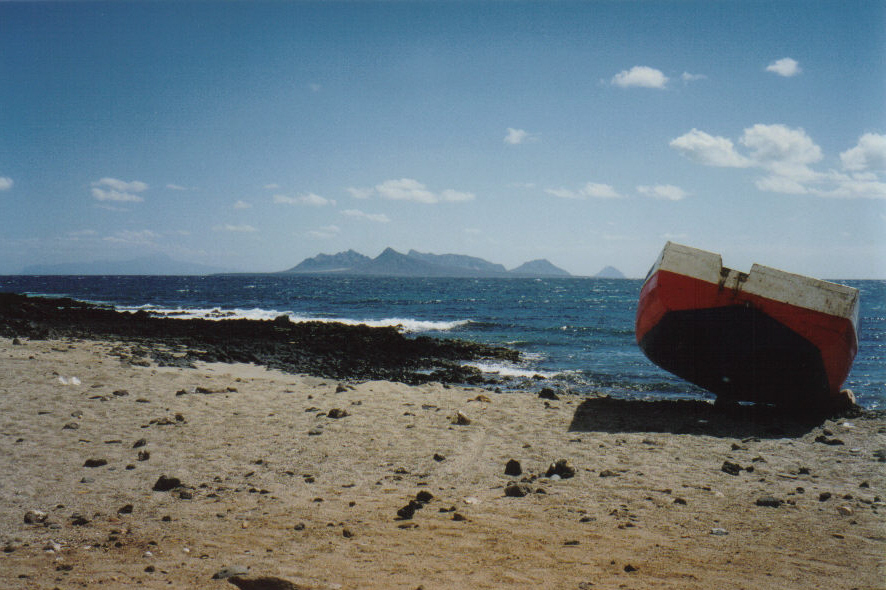
View of the island of São Vicente facing Calhau and Monte Verde. On the left is the island of Santo Antão

== History ==
The island was discovered on December 13, 1461, and named after the saint of the day, Saint Lucy (Santa Luzia), by Portuguese explorer Diogo Afonso, who was serving under Prince Henry the Navigator.

== Recent ==
In the 20th century, a meteorology station was built. Today, fishermen from the nearby islands of São Vicente and Santo Antão fish in the waters around the island.

== Geography ==
The channel of Santa Luzia separates the island of São Vicente, 9 kilometres (5.6 mi) distance, and is 8 kilometres (5.0 mi) wide. The area is 34.2 kilometres (21.3 mi)^{2}. All of the Cape Verdean islands are of volcanic origin. The highest point is Topona elevation 395 m (1,296 ft). Santa Luzia is 12.4 kilometres (7.7 mi) long and 5.3 kilometres (3.3 mi) wide.

Santa Luzia is part of the northern Barlovento group of islands, specifically the western subgroup of windward islands, which includes the volcanic and rocky islands of Santo Antão, São Vicente, São Nicolau, the islets Branco and Raso, as well as the uninhabited Santa Luzia. The island sits off the westernmost point of Africa, approximately 879 kilometres (546 mi) from Dakar, the capital of Senegal.,

== Climate ==
The island has an arid climate and a desert-like landscape.

== Government ==
Administratively, it is not part of any municipality, but in the public domain of the state of Cape Verde. The islands proclaimed their independence on 5 July 1975, with the new name, The República Cabo Verde.

== Protection status ==
Together with the islets of Branco and Raso, Santa Luzia was placed on the tentative list of UNESCO's World Heritage Sites in 2016. Santa Luzia, Ilhéu Branco and Ilhéu Raso were declared a protected area as Santa Luzia Nature Reserve (Reserva Natural Integral de Santa Luzia) in 1990. In addition to the islands proper, 43 km^{2} (17 sq mi), the nature reserve covers 469 km^{2} (181 sq mi) of ocean.

The NGO conservation organization Bisofera1, working with the Cape Verde government, monitors and protects the Santa Luzia Nature Reserve and the Santa Luzia Marine Protected Area (MPA) that covers approximately 11,000 hectares (27,000 acres). Funding and support are provided by Ecofund, the Critical Ecosystem Partnership Fund (CEPF), which includes l'Agence Française de Développement (AFD), Conservation International, the European Union, the Global Environment Facility (GEF), the Government of Japan, the Fondation Hans Wilsdorf, the Government of Canada, and the World Bank. A common goal is to help civil society engage in biodiversity conservation in threatened ecosystems. The New England Aquarium's Marine Conservation Society, through the Marine Conservation Action Fund (MCAF) and BirdLife International are active in Santa Luzie conservation initiatives. Terrimar is using MCAF to patrol turtle breeding grounds on Santa Luzia. Conservation work can be dangerous. On May 30, 2013, Jairo Mora Sandoval, a marine biologist, was kidnapped and murdered on Moín Beach in Costa Rica. In 2019, British marine biologist Alexander "Zeddy" Seymour drowned while researching sharks and rays in Cape Verde.

In 2022, over 2,000 clutches were recorded. Biosfera Association teams with partners, like Plastic Odyssey, where around 100 volunteers clean up from 60 to 180 tons of trash every single year.

The sea snail species conus santaluziensis can also be found in the waters of Santa Luzia.

== Flora ==
The semi-arid climate (Sahel region subject to the Harmattan winds) is harsh, but there are hardy plants that flourish. The unique endemic species Lotus brunneri (Piorno), a subshrub, is also found on Sal, Boa Vista, Maio, and also recorded on São Vicente. The perennial shrub Euphorbia tuckeyana (tortolho) is also only found on the Cape Verdean archipelago. The Calotropis procera (Apple of Sodom or Giant Milkweed), an introduced invasive species that has become naturalized, grows on the islands, especially on Sal. There is unconfirmed evidence that the endemic Cape Verde date palm (Phoenix atlantica A. Chev.) was possibly on the island at some point.

== Fauna ==
Wildlife is abundant on the island, but mainly in the surrounding waters.

=== Mammals ===
The grey long-eared bat (Plecotus austriacus) is indigenous to Cape Verde, but other than a vagrant trip, there is no evidence of habitat. There is evidence that the House Mouse (Mus musculus) is on the island. Feral cats (Felis catus) were a major concern before being eradicated in 2020 (Medina et al., 2021).

=== Reptiles ===
Several species of reptiles make their home on Santa Luzia, or use it as a breeding ground. Stanger's skink (Chioninia stangeri), the Raso wall gecko (Tarentola raziana), and Bouvier's leaf-toed gecko (Hemidactylus bouvieri), as well as the endangered Hawksbill sea turtles have been observed on the island.

=== Loggerhead sea turtles ===
The nesting area with sandy beaches on the southern end of the island is considered a biodiversity hotspot. The Loggerhead sea turtle nests on the island. The archipelago is the second-largest nesting area in the Atlantic and hosts the world's third-largest population overall. The organization Sea Sheppard has helped clean up marine debris such as discarded fishing gear.

=== Birds ===
There is evidence that a colony of Cape Verde Shearwater (Calonectris edwardsii) was historically on the island, but became extirpated with the introduction of invasive species, such as the feral cat. The same appears to be evident with the Boyd's shearwater (Puffinus boydi). When the cats were eradicated, the species began returning to the island. There is hope they will recolonize. The extirpated Raso Lark (Alaudala rufescens) was reintroduced between 2018 and 2020 from Raso to Santa Luzia. Other birds with historical evidence of nesting on the island, since extirpated, are the white-faced storm petrel (Pelagodroma marina eadesorum). In 1912, the Puffinus boydi was considered a subspecies of the Puffinus lherminieri boydi. The specimen was obtained from Cape Verde. From the mid-to-late 20th century, the species was considered a subspecies of either the Little Shearwater (Puffinus assimilis) or Audubon's Shearwater (Puffinus lherminieri). In 2004, evidence showed a reclassification was in order. In 2022, further genetic analysis confirmed that Puffinus boydi, Puffinus baroli and Puffinus lherminieri, should be treated as separate species. In 2024 the American Ornithological Society (AOS) recognized the separate species Puffinus boydi. The Puffinus baroli (Puffinus boydi was considered the same species). The Cape Verde Storm Petrel (Hydrobates jabejabe) has two different groups that breed at different times, referred to as temporal Isolation.

The African stonechat (Saxicola torquatus) has had unconfirmed sightings, but the Canary Island Stonechat (Saxicola dacotiae) nests on the island. The non-native Black-headed Weaver (Ploceus melanocephalus) was likely introduced. Sightings of the Cabo Verde Warbler (Ploceus melanocephalus), endemic to Santiago, Fogo, São Nicolau, and Brava, are likely just vagrant. The Cape Verde Swift (Apus alexandri) travels between the islands, but there is no evidence of nesting on Santa Luzia. The non-breeding range of the Northern Gannet (Morus bassanus) extends as far as the Cape Verde islands, including Santa Luzia. The Red-footed Booby (Sula sula) has been confirmed nesting on Raso, so sightings around Santa Luzia would be expected. The non-breeding range of the Northern Gannet (Morus bassanus) extends as far as the Cape Verde islands, including Santa Luzia. The Lesser Cape Verde Kestrel (Falco neglectus or F. t. neglectus), a northern island subspecies of the Common Kestrel (Falco tinnunculus), is found on the island. In contrast, the Alexander's Kestrel (Falco alexandri) is found on the southern islands.

== Uninhabited ==
The island has never had long-term permanent inhabitants, but it has been used for grazing animals. There was a small community, estimated to be about 20, in the 1800s that raised cattle and other animals, contributing to the Cape Verde economy, and by orchil extraction from lichen used to make a purplish dye. Since the 1990s the island has been uninhabited.

== See also ==
- Cape Verde Islands dry forests
- Flora of Cape Verde
- List of endemic plants of Cape Verde
