= List of World Heritage Sites in Cabo Verde =

Location of World Heritage Sites in Cape Verde

The United Nations Educational, Scientific and Cultural Organization (UNESCO) designates World Heritage Sites of outstanding universal value to cultural or natural heritage which have been nominated by countries which are signatories to the UNESCO World Heritage Convention, established in 1972. Cultural heritage consists of monuments (such as architectural works, monumental sculptures, or inscriptions), groups of buildings, and sites (including archaeological sites). Natural features (consisting of physical and biological formations), geological and physiographical formations (including habitats of threatened species of animals and plants), and natural sites which are important from the point of view of science, conservation or natural beauty, are defined as natural heritage. Cabo Verde accepted the convention on April 29, 1988, making its historical sites eligible for inclusion on the list. As of 2025, Cape Verde has only one World Heritage Site.

== World Heritage Sites ==
UNESCO lists sites under ten criteria; each entry must meet at least one of the criteria. Criteria i through vi are cultural, and vii through x are natural.

World Heritage Sites
Site	Image	Location (municipality)	Year listed	UNESCO data	Description
Cidade Velha, Historic Centre of Ribeira Grande	A white church	Ribeira Grande	2009	1310; ii, iii, iv (cultural)	The town of Ribeira Grande, renamed Cidade Velha in the late 18th century, was the first European colonial outpost in the tropics. Located in the south of the island of Santiago, the town features some of the original street layout impressive remains including two churches, a royal fortress and Pillory Square with its ornate 16th century marble pillar.

== Tentative list ==
In addition to sites inscribed on the World Heritage List, member states can maintain a list of tentative sites that they may consider for nomination. Nominations for the World Heritage List are only accepted if the site was previously listed on the tentative list. As of 2025, Cape Verde has listed nine properties on its tentative list.

Tentative sites
Site	Image	Location (municipality)	Year listed	UNESCO criteria	Description
Nova Sintra Historic Centre	A catholic church next to houses, trees and flowers	Brava	2016	iv, vi (cultural)	
Fogo Natural Park-Chã das Caldeiras		Mosteiros, Santa Catarina do Fogo, São Filipe	2016	viii, x (natural)	
Complex of protected areas of Santa Luzia, Branco and Raso Islands		São Vicente	2016	ix, x (natural)	
Tarrafal concentration camp		Tarrafal	2016	iii, vi (cultural)	
Praia Historic Center		Praia	2016	ii (cultural)	
São Filipe Historic Center		São Filipe	2016	iv, vi (cultural)	
Cova-Paul-Ribeira da Torre Natural Park		Ribeira Grande	2016	v, vii, x (mixed)	
Pedra de Lume salt works		Sal	2016	v, vii (mixed)	
