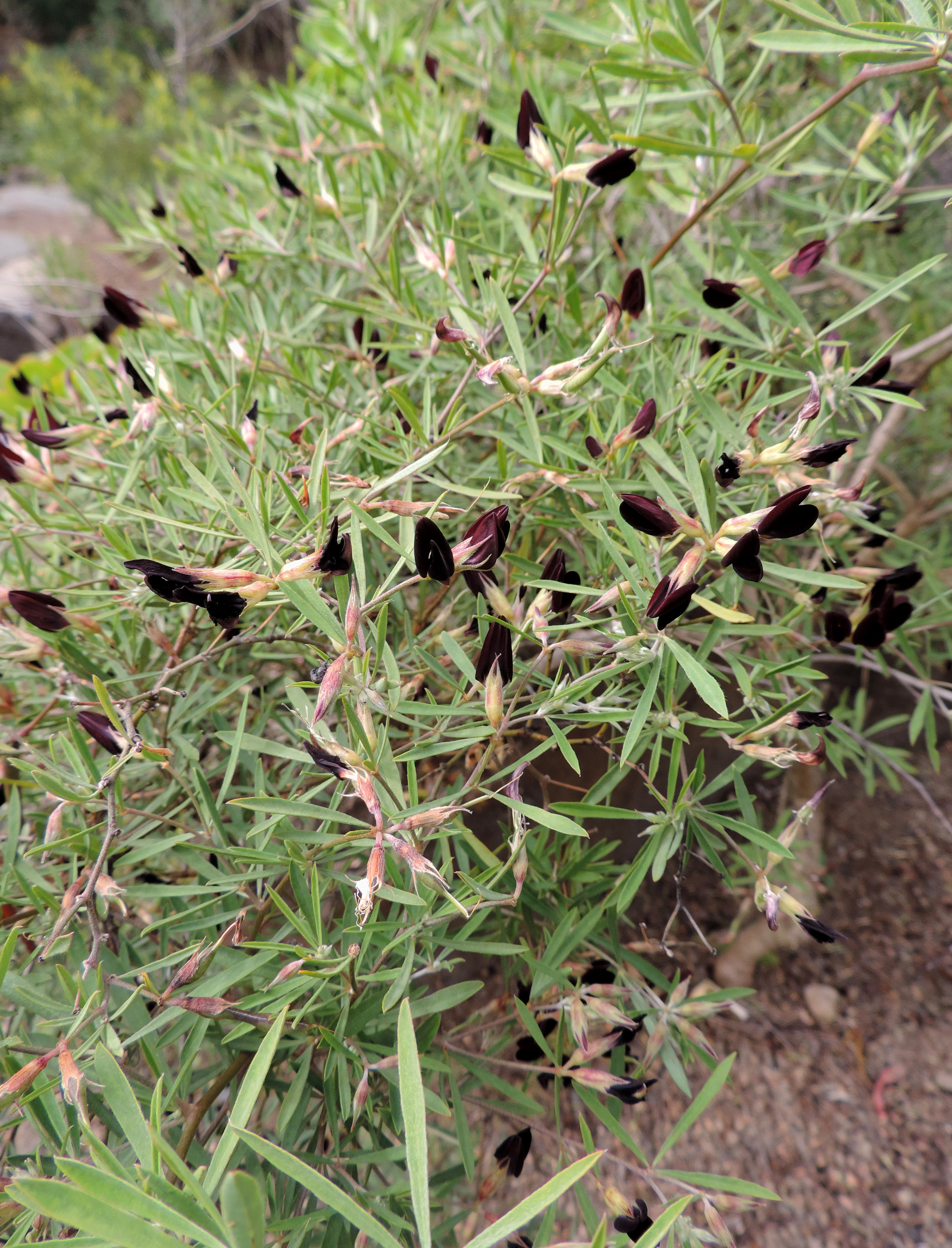
- Lotus jacobaeus in the Canary Islands

Conservation status
- Data Deficient (IUCN 3.1)

Scientific classification
- Kingdom: Plantae
- Clade: Tracheophytes
- Clade: Angiosperms
- Clade: Eudicots
- Clade: Rosids
- Order: Fabales
- Family: Fabaceae
- Subfamily: Faboideae
- Genus: Lotus
- Species: L. jacobaeus

Binomial name
- Lotus jacobaeus L., 1753

= Lotus jacobaeus =

Species of legume

Lotus jacobaeus is a species of flowering plant of the family Fabaceae. The species is endemic to Cape Verde. It was described by Carolus Linnaeus in 1753 in the second volume of Species Plantarum.

== Description ==
Its petals are coloured yellow or yellow and purple.

== Distribution ==
The species occurs on most islands of Cape Verde, except Brava and Santa Luzia. It grows in semi-arid and sub-humid zones.
