= Conus santaluziensis =

- Terrain map of Santa Luzia

Scientific classification
- Kingdom: Animalia
- Phylum: Mollusca
- Class: Gastropoda
- Subclass: Caenogastropoda
- Order: Neogastropoda
- Superfamily: Conoidea
- Family: Conidae
- Genus: Conus
- Species: C. santaluziensis

Binomial name
- Conus santaluziensis (Cossignani & Fiadeiro, 2015)

Synonyms
- Africonus santaluziensis T. Cossignani and R. Fiadeiro, 2015 (original combination), with subspecies included: Conus (Lautoconus) santaluziensis. Varioconus is a synonym of Conus Lautoconus (Monterosato, 1923) and of Conus (Linnaeus, 1758).

Species of sea snail

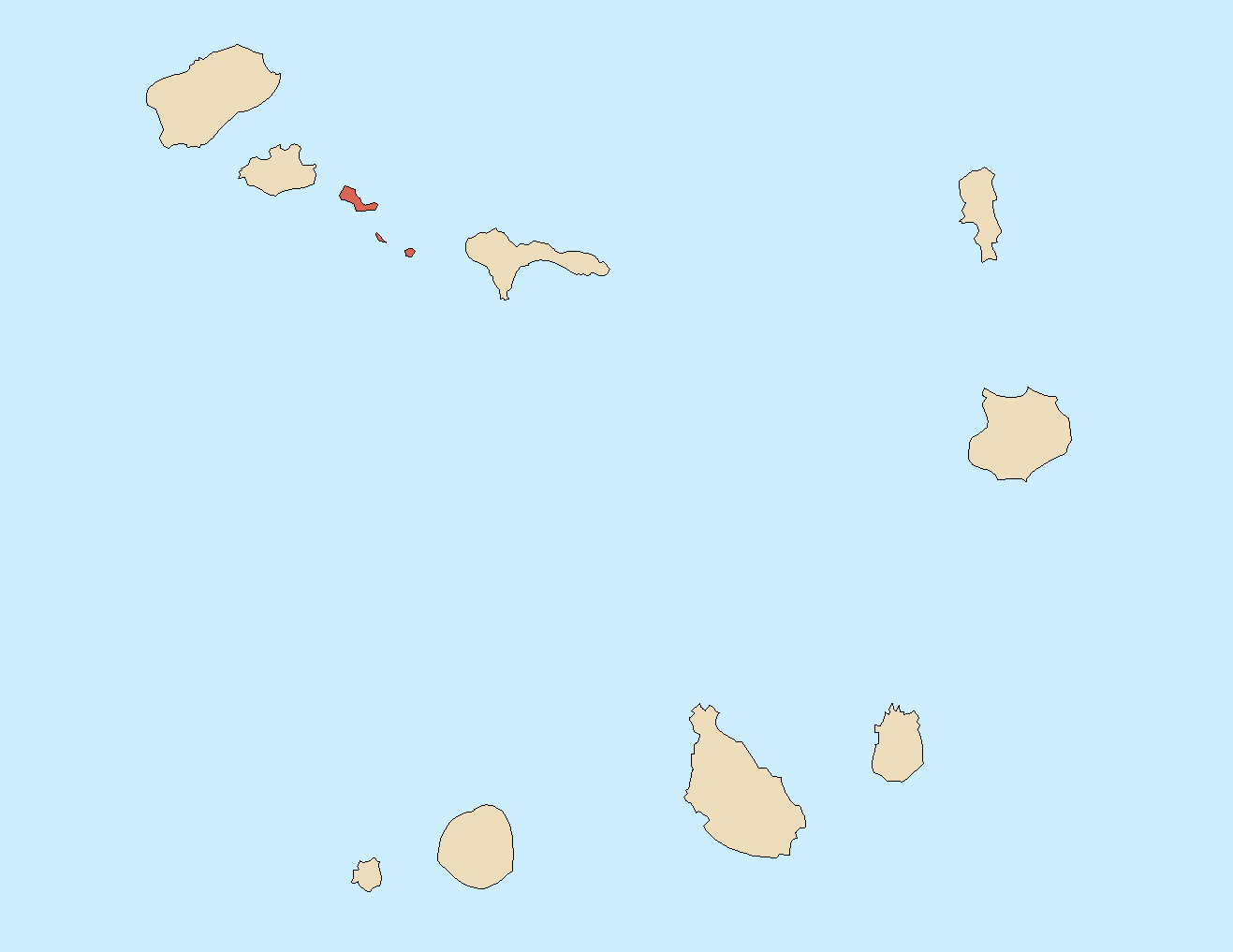
Locator map of Santa Luzia, Cape Verde

Conus santaluziensis is a species of sea snail, a marine gastropod mollusc in the family Conidae, often referred to as the cone snails, cone shells or cones. One of over 803 species, they are predatory, venomous and are capable of stinging humans. The exact count has not yet been determined, considering ongoing debates and potential reclassifications.

== Etymology ==
There is an ongoing debate within the malacological community concerning the classification of cone snails in general, and specifically around Santa Luzia. The species was classified as Africonus santaluziensis (Afonso & Tenorio, 2014) and was also named "Africonus gonsalensis" (Cossignani & Fiadeiro, 2014). However, "Africonus santaluziensis" had precedence, which relegated "Africonus gonsalensis" to a synonym.

== Genus ==
Before 2014, the genus Conus was divided into many smaller genera. Carl Linnaeus: (1758) first described the genus Conus, placing all species in the genus. Others proposed multiple genera. J.H. Hwass: suggested three genera in 1792, J.B.P. Montfort proposed five in 1810, and L.A. Kiener: proposed six genera in 1845. In 1995, the publication Manual of the Living Conidae considered splitting the group, but sufficient data were lacking. A revision in 2009 (Tucker & Tenorio, 2009), and a prevailing convention in malacology resulted in a single genus with multiple genera.

== Species ==
One of over 803 species, they are predatory, venomous and are capable of stinging humans. The exact count is not yet determined, considering ongoing debates and possible reclassifications.

In 2015, a major revision was published in the Journal of Molluscan Studies (Puillandre et al., including Duda, Meyer, Olivera & Bouchet), that utilized molecular phylogenetic analysis. The study resulted in the proposal of the family name, Conidae, with four genera (Conus, Conasprella, Profundiconus, and Californiconus, covering around 803 species; the traditional genus Conus has become widely accepted by taxonomists, but the classifications are still being debated.

== Description ==
The species is hard-shelled, the size ranges from 15 millimetres (0.59 in) to 36 millimetres (1.4 in), and is vermivorous (worm-eaters). The "cones" are equipped with a proboscis .

== Distribution ==
The species is locally endemic to the area around the Reserva Natural Integral de Santa Luzia off Santa Luzia Island, Cape Verde.

== Habitat ==
The species' habitat is predominantly tropical and subtropical waters. Conus exhibits dual preferences: low tide, where they are exposed to air at times, and staying submerged at all times. C. santaluziensis prefers the latter, in or around coral reefs and sandy ground.
