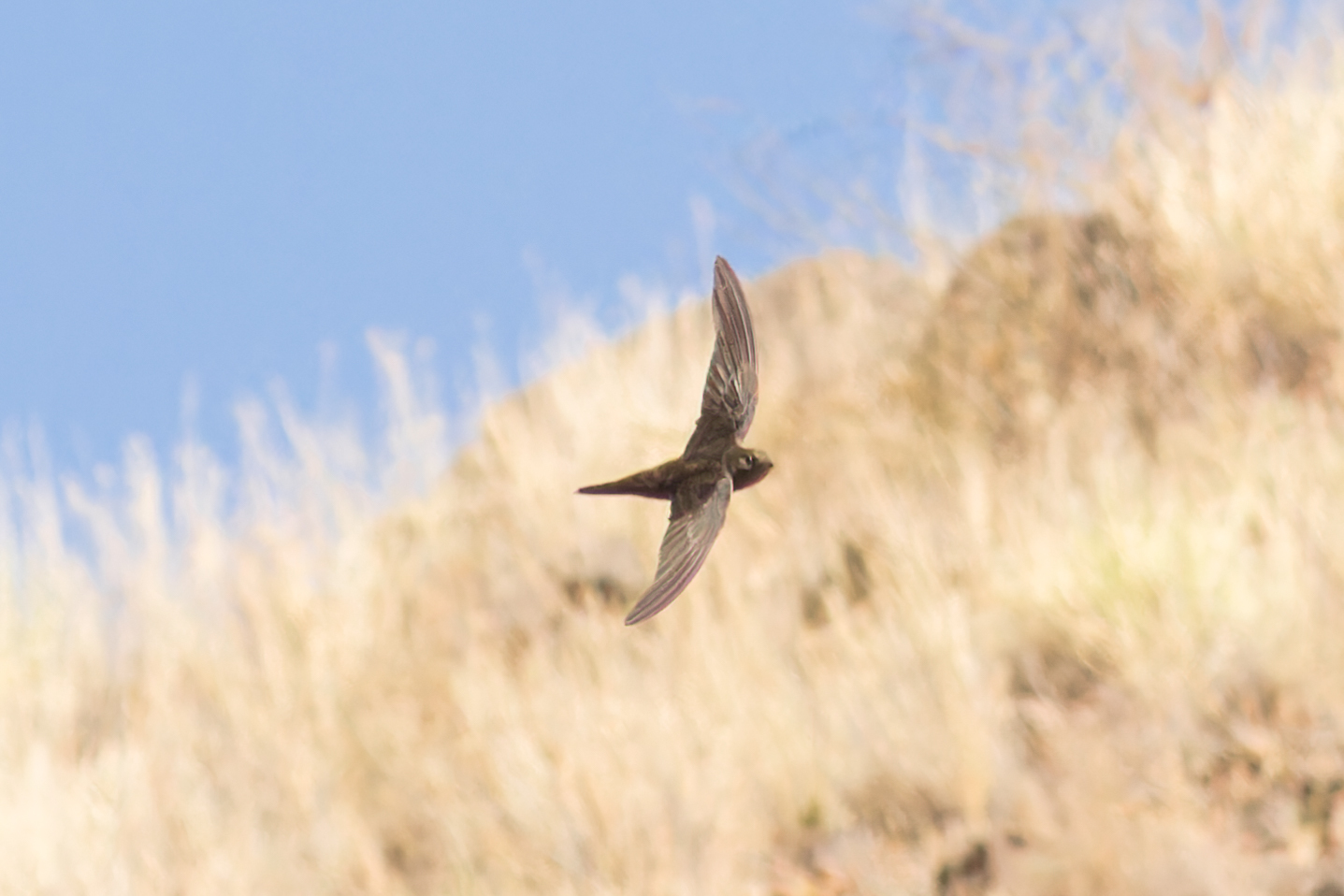

Conservation status
- Least Concern (IUCN 3.1)

Scientific classification
- Kingdom: Animalia
- Phylum: Chordata
- Class: Aves
- Order: Apodiformes
- Family: Apodidae
- Genus: Apus
- Species: A. alexandri

Binomial name
- Apus alexandri Hartert, 1901

= Cape Verde swift =

Species of bird

The Cape Verde swift or Alexander's swift (Apus alexandri) is a small bird of the swift family found only in the Cape Verde Islands. It has been recorded from all the islands except Santa Luzia although it probably breeds only on Santiago, Fogo, Brava, Santo Antão and São Nicolau. It is generally common with a stable population and is not considered to be threatened. The name Alexander's swift commemorates Boyd Alexander, an English ornithologist who led two expeditions to the islands in 1897.

== Description ==
It is 13 cm long with a wingspan of 34 to 35 cm. The plumage is dark grey-brown with a large pale throat patch. Compared to other swifts recorded from the islands it is smaller with shorter wings and a shallower fork to the tail. Its flight action is weaker and more fluttering. It has a high-pitched, screaming call with a buzzing quality.

== Ecology ==
The Cape Verde swift feeds on insects that it catches while flying. It can be seen flying over all habitats and hunts in flight for insects, foraging in flocks over gullies and along cliffs and shorelines. The nest is built in a crevice in a cliff, in a cave, or on the roof of a building. It is saucer-shaped and made of grass and feathers. The eggs are white and a clutch size of two has been reported. The bird is thought to be resident rather than migratory.

== Status ==
The Cape Verde swift has a restricted range but is a common bird on the archipelago, with large numbers on Fogo and Brava. There is no evidence that its numbers are declining and no specific threats have been recognized, so the International Union for Conservation of Nature has assessed its conservation status as being of "least concern".
