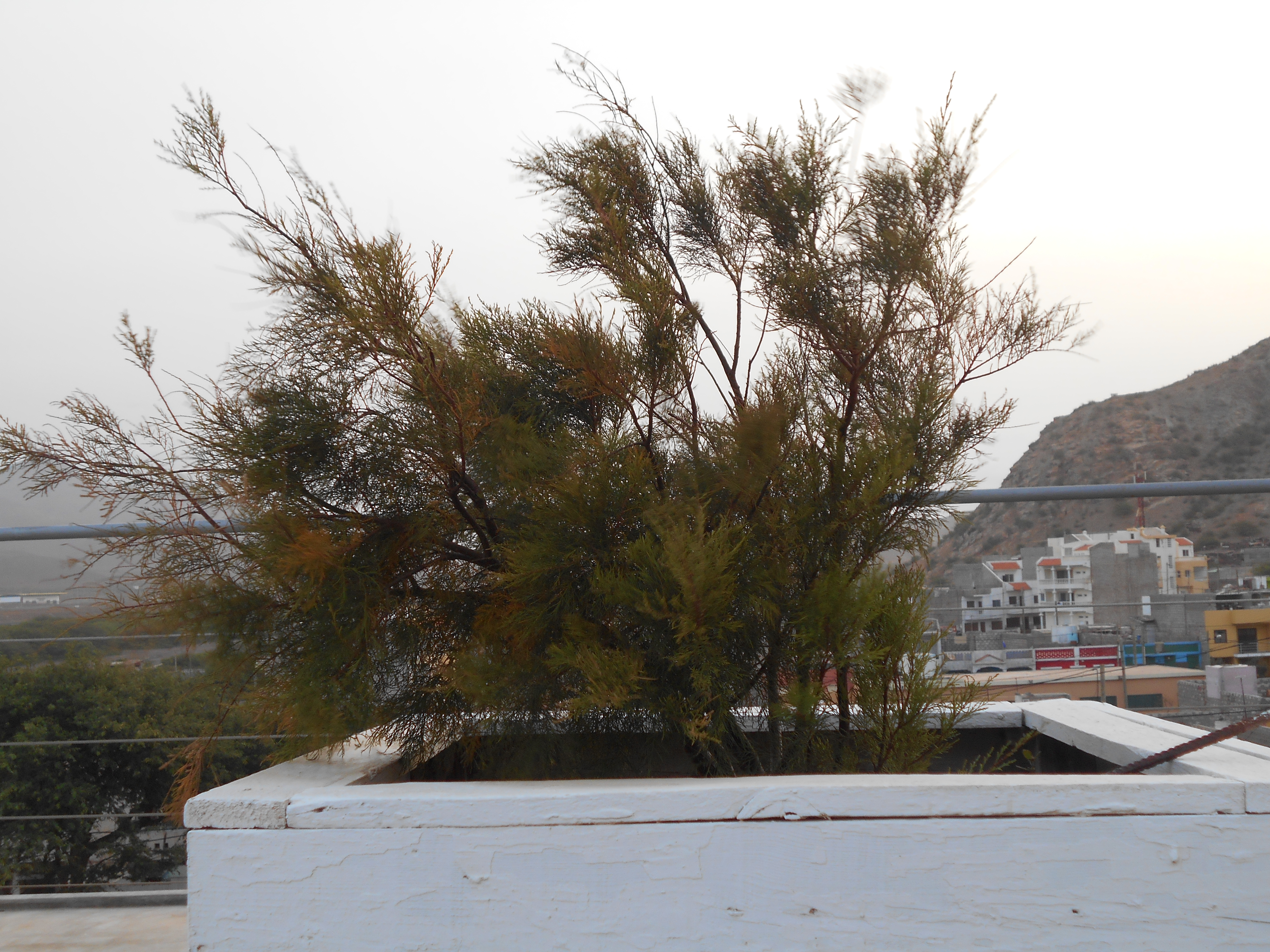
- Tamarix senegalensis in São Pedro, São Vicente, Cape Verde

Scientific classification
- Kingdom: Plantae
- Clade: Tracheophytes
- Clade: Angiosperms
- Clade: Eudicots
- Order: Caryophyllales
- Family: Tamaricaceae
- Genus: Tamarix
- Species: T. senegalensis

Binomial name
- Tamarix senegalensis DC., 1828

= Tamarix senegalensis =

Species of flowering plant

Tamarix senegalensis is a species of flowering plants of the Tamaricaceae family. It is a tree or twiggy shrub, that grows in saline soil, sandy desert and sea-shore.

== Description ==
Tamarix senegalensis is a large shrub, reaching 2–5 metres height. It has many small leaves. In Cape Verde it is called tarrafe, and the related name tarrafal has been given to a number of localities.

== Distribution and ecology ==
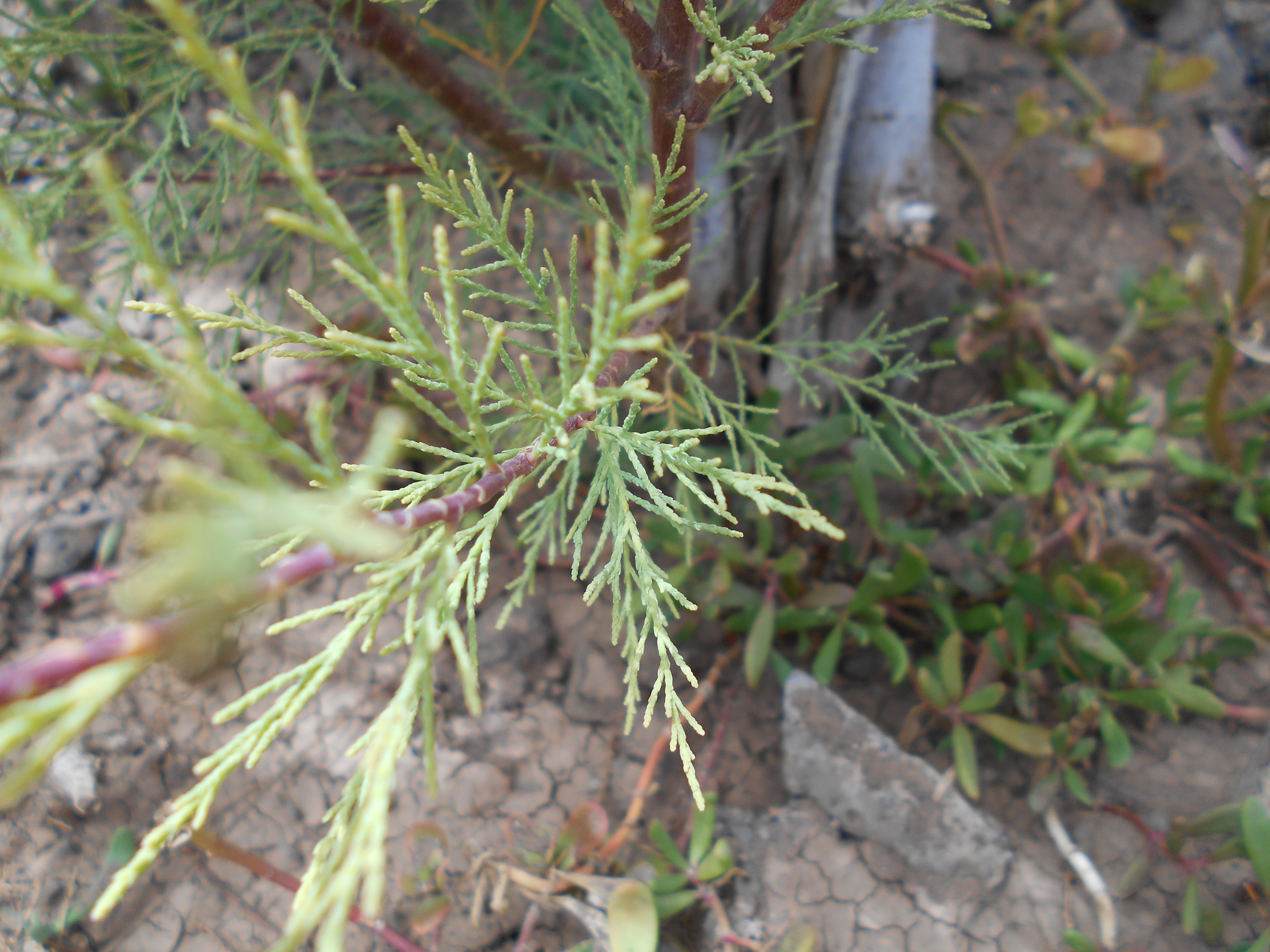
Leaves of the Senegalese tamarisk

Tamarix senegalensis occurs on and near the coasts of northwestern Africa (Morocco, Mauritania, Senegal) and the Cape Verde islands.
