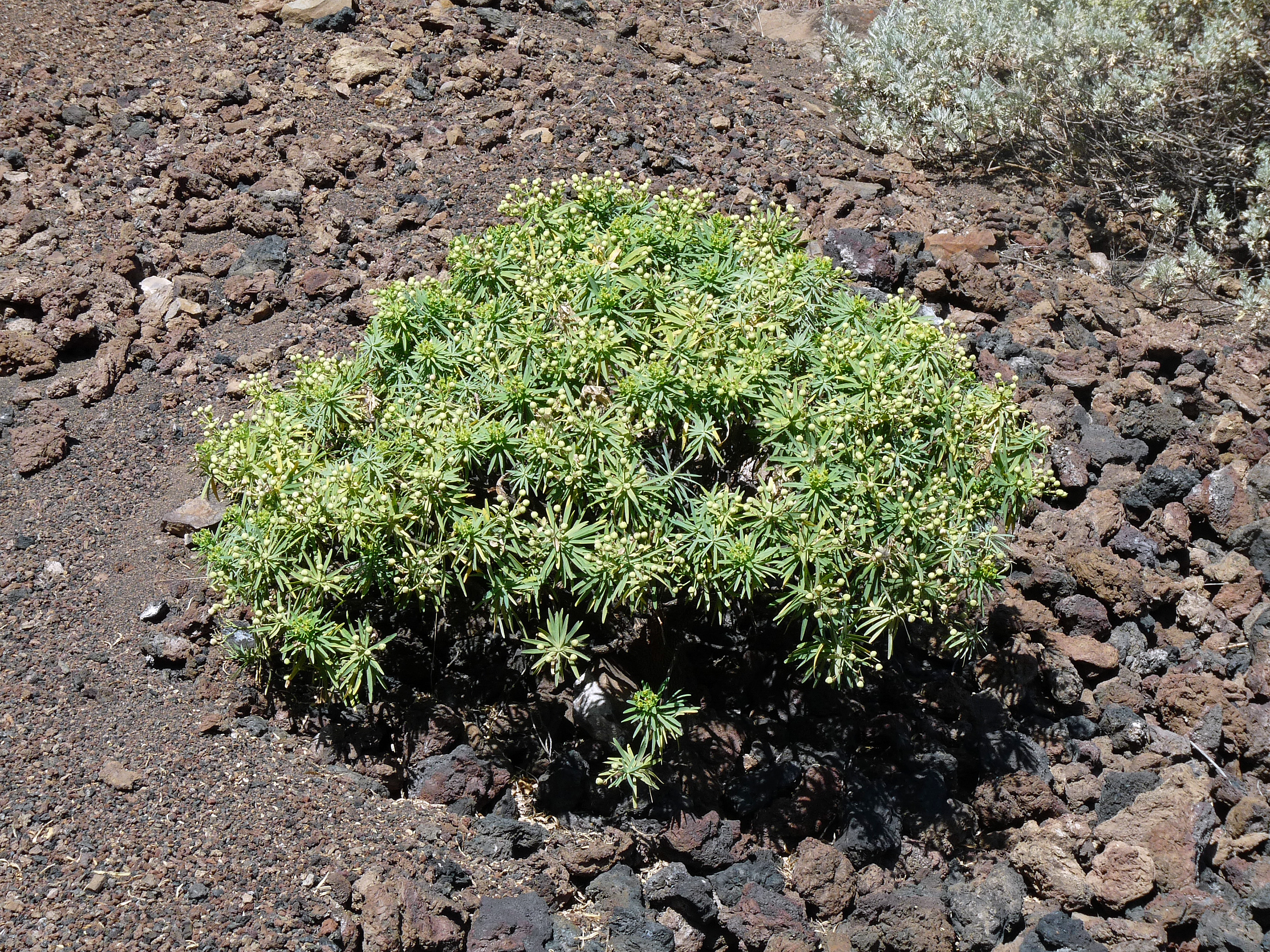
- Euphorbia tuckeyana at Chã das Caldeiras

Conservation status
- Near Threatened (IUCN 3.1)
- CITES Appendix II (CITES)

Scientific classification
- Kingdom: Plantae
- Clade: Tracheophytes
- Clade: Angiosperms
- Clade: Eudicots
- Clade: Rosids
- Order: Malpighiales
- Family: Euphorbiaceae
- Genus: Euphorbia
- Species: E. tuckeyana

Binomial name
- Euphorbia tuckeyana Steud. ex. Webb, 1849

Synonyms
- Euphorbia arborescens C.Sm; Euphorbia tuckeyana var. mezereum Chev. (from The Plant List); Tithymalus tuckeyanus (Steud. ex Webb) Bolle ex Klotzsch & Garcke

= Euphorbia tuckeyana =

Species of flowering plant

Euphorbia tuckeyana is a species of flowering plants of the family Euphorbiaceae. The species is endemic to Cape Verde. The species is named after James Hingston Tuckey. Its local name is tortolho. The plants are used for tanning hides. As most other succulent members of the genus Euphorbia, its trade is regulated under Appendix II of CITES.

== Description ==
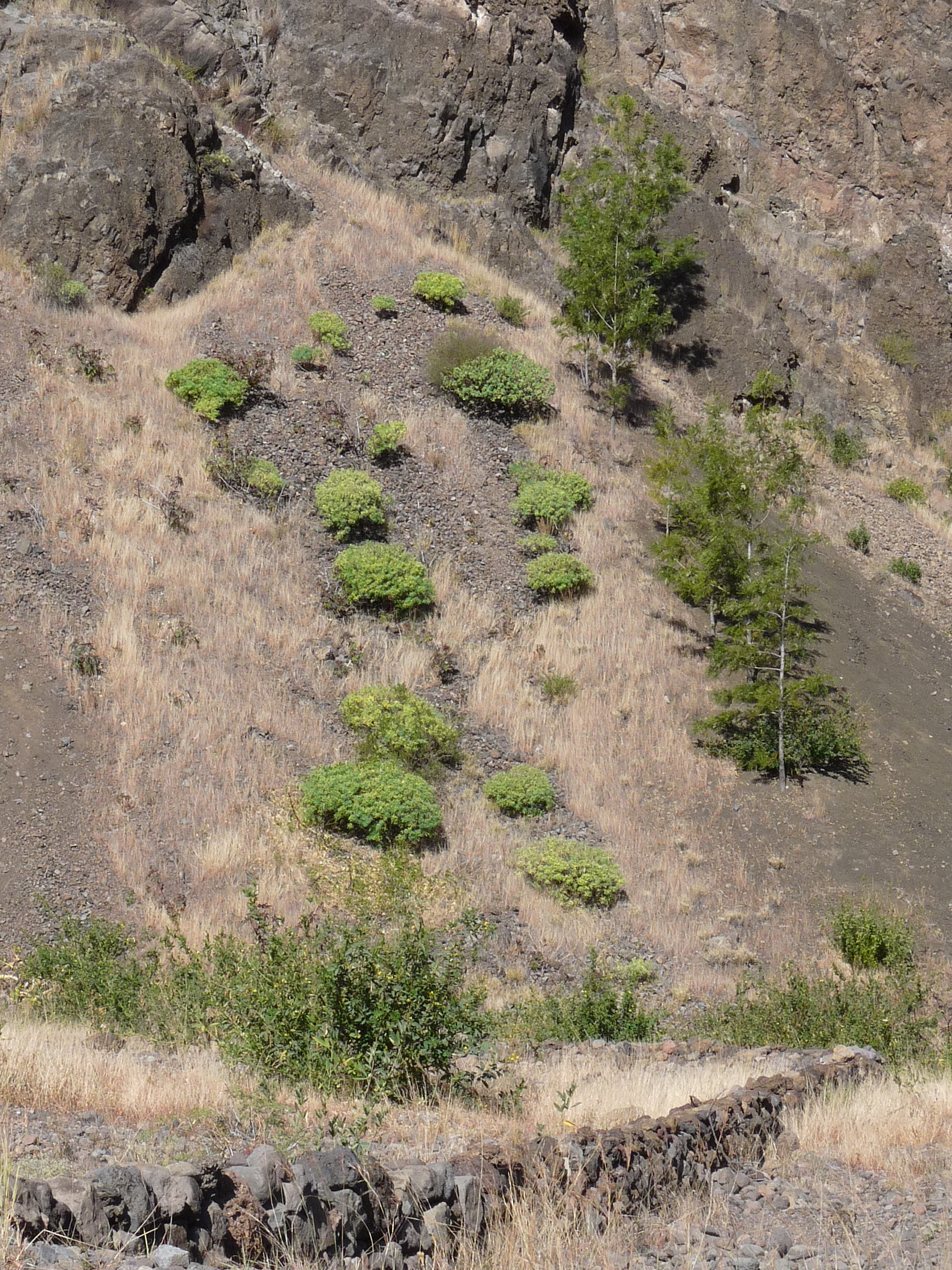
Euphorbia tuckeyana on the crater rim of Chã de Caldeiras on Fogo Island

Euphorbia tuckeyana is a shrub that can reach 3 m height. It has milky sap. Its elliptical leaves are placed in rosettes. It has yellow flowers.

== Distribution and ecology ==
Euphorbia tuckeyana occurs on most of the Cape Verde islands, but not on Maio. It grows in semi-arid, sub-humid and humid zones, between 100 and 2,500 metres elevation. The plants grow in rocky places and escarpments. It is characteristic of the endemic vegetation of the Cape Verde Islands.
