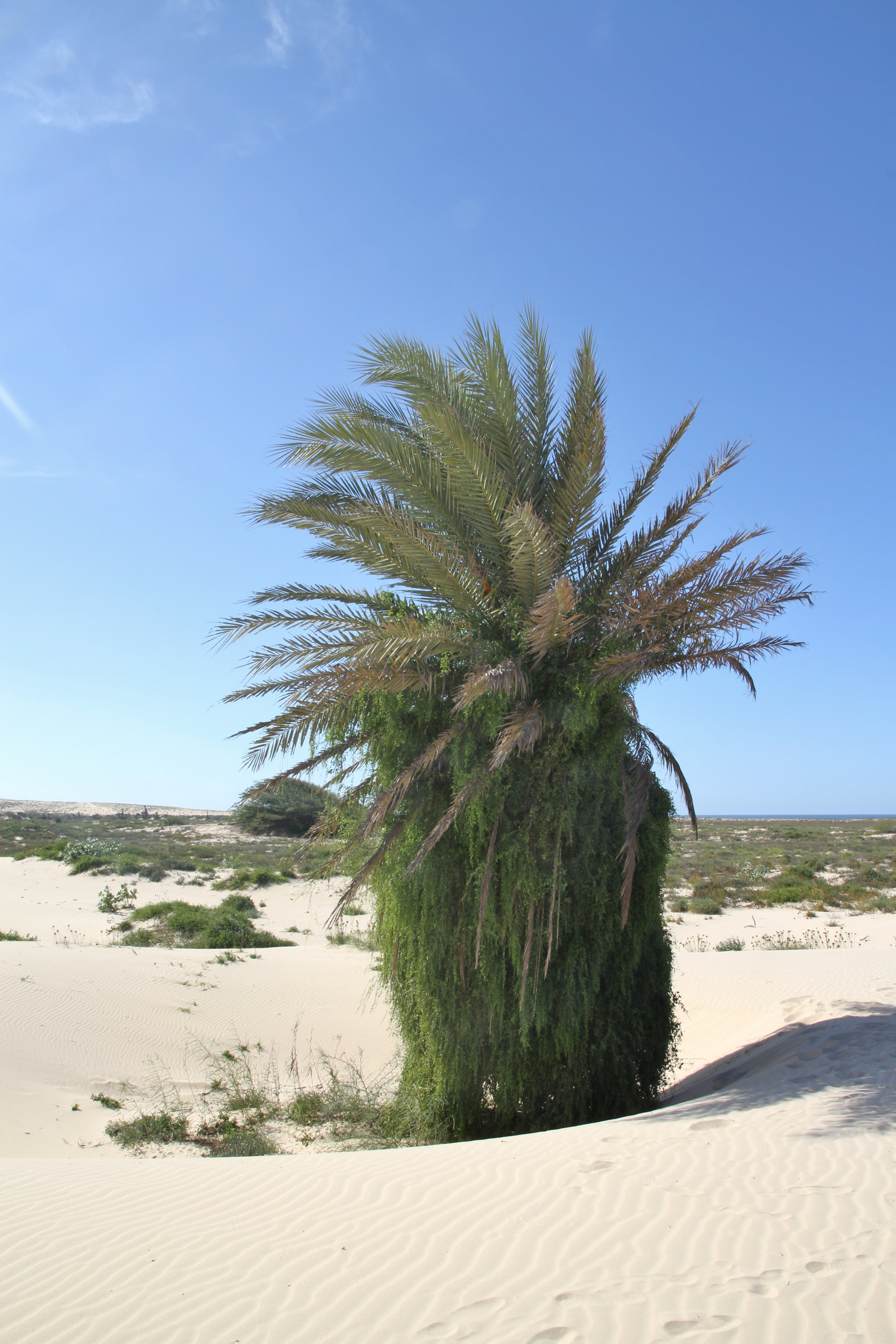
- Phoenix atlantica. The palm tree has other green plants under its shade-giving leaves.

Conservation status
- Endangered (IUCN 3.1)

Scientific classification
- Kingdom: Plantae
- Clade: Tracheophytes
- Clade: Angiosperms
- Clade: Monocots
- Clade: Commelinids
- Order: Arecales
- Family: Arecaceae
- Genus: Phoenix
- Species: P. atlantica

Binomial name
- Phoenix atlantica A.Chev.

= Phoenix atlantica =

Cape Verde Island date palm

Species of palm

Phoenix atlantica (common name Cape Verde Island date palm, local name: tamareira) is an endangered species in the palm family Arecaceae, in the genus Phoenix. It is endemic to the Cape Verde Islands.

== Overview ==
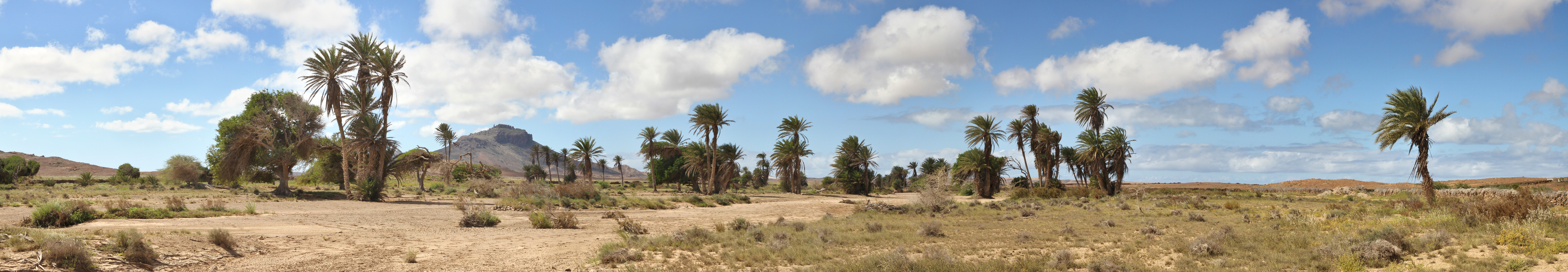
View of an oasis-like location, in the area of central western Boa Vista, with Tamareiras

Phoenix atlantica is a relative of Phoenix dactylifera, the cultivated date palm. P. atlantica is clearly distinct from its close relatives and that its closest relative is likely to be its nearest geographical neighbour, P. dactylifera. The Cape Verde palm, is endemic to the Cape Verde Islands, and was erroneously characterized as a feral Phoenix dactylifera. Three species of the genus Phoenix are recorded from the Cape Verde Islands, P. dactylifera L., P. canariensis Chabaud and P. atlantica A. Chev. While human activity has almost certainly introduced the former two species, the latter is endemic to the islands. Genetic isolation of Cape Verde Island P. atlantica was revealed by microsatellite markers and one chloroplast minisatellite marker to individuals of Phoenix from the Cape Verde Islands, P. dactylifera, P. canariensis and P. sylvestris, in order to assess the taxonomic position of P. atlantica within the genus. The DNA analysis by S. A. Henderson, N. Billotte and J.-C. Pintaud, demonstrated Genetic isolation of Phoenix atlantica.

Phoenix atlantica was first described in 1935 by the French botanist Auguste Chevalier. Its appearance is very similar to Phoenix dactylifera, being more similar in form to P. dactylifera than to Phoenix canariensis, and possessing characters of both. Tamareira is a clustering palm with 2 to 6 trunks, 5–15 m (16–49 ft) in height with dark green leaves 2–3 m (6.6–9.8 ft) in length. P. atlantica can be distinguished easily from P. canariensis by its clustering growth form and its shorter, straighter leaves. The Canary Island date palm is adapted to a wetter climate and cooler temperatures, down to −8 °C (18 °F). Other distinctions between P. atlantica and P. dactylifera include acuminate petals in the male flowers according to Chevalier in 1935, Greuter in 1967, and Brochmann et al. in 1997. The fruit is an oval, pink drupe 2 cm long and 1 cm diameter and containing a single large seed, the fruit pulp is edible but scarce.
