= Foreign relations of Cape Verde =

Cape Verde follows a policy of nonalignment and seeks cooperative relations with all friendly states. Angola, Brazil, the People's Republic of China, Cuba, France, Germany, Portugal, Senegal, Russia, and the United States maintain embassies in Praia.

Cape Verde is actively interested in foreign affairs, especially in Africa. It has bilateral relations with some Lusophone nations and holds membership in a number of international organizations. It also participates in most international conferences on economic and political issues.

== Diplomatic relations ==
List of countries which Cape Verde maintains diplomatic relations with:

#	Country	Date
1	Guinea-Bissau	5 July 1975
2	Senegal	6 July 1975
3	Guinea	8 July 1975
4	Vietnam	8 July 1975
5	Japan	11 July 1975
6	Hungary	16 July 1975
7	Portugal	18 July 1975
8	United States	19 July 1975
9	Liberia	27 July 1975
10	North Korea	18 August 1975
11	Cuba	5 September 1975
12	Romania	17 September 1975
13	Russia	19 September 1975
14	Argentina	26 September 1975
15	Czech Republic	28 October 1975
16	Mongolia	19 November 1975
17	Brazil	5 December 1975
18	France	31 December 1975
19	Equatorial Guinea	1975
20	Poland	12 February 1976
21	Mexico	19 February 1976
22	Mozambique	15 March 1976
23	China	25 April 1976
—	Holy See	12 May 1976
24	Canada	20 July 1976
25	Nigeria	18 August 1976
26	Egypt	19 October 1976
27	Italy	18 November 1976
28	Netherlands	20 November 1976
29	Sweden	4 December 1976
30	Serbia	1976
31	Mauritania	18 January 1977
32	Luxembourg	31 March 1977
33	Norway	9 May 1977
34	United Kingdom	17 May 1977
35	India	6 June 1977
36	Belgium	12 July 1977
37	Iceland	20 July 1977
38	Ghana	4 October 1977
39	Algeria	19 October 1977
40	Angola	30 October 1977
41	Spain	21 December 1977
42	Republic of the Congo	1977
43	Sierra Leone	8 January 1978
44	Iraq	9 January 1978
45	Gambia	January 1978
46	Austria	29 April 1978
47	Turkey	24 June 1979
48	Ivory Coast	3 December 1979
49	Tanzania	11 March 1980
50	Germany	2 June 1980
51	Bulgaria	5 June 1980
52	Switzerland	25 June 1980
53	Albania	6 August 1980
54	Tunisia	1981
55	Zambia	10 July 1982
56	Finland	22 July 1983
57	Nicaragua	25 October 1983
58	Ethiopia	October 1983
59	Cambodia	23 March 1984
60	Morocco	1985
61	Zimbabwe	March 1986
62	Greece	24 April 1986
63	Thailand	2 December 1986
64	Seychelles	9 March 1987
65	Kuwait	30 March 1987
66	Colombia	27 July 1987
67	Pakistan	30 October 1987
68	South Korea	3 October 1988
69	Peru	1 November 1988
70	Bolivia	1 March 1989
—	State of Palestine	1989
71	Estonia	1 October 1991
72	Ukraine	25 March 1992
73	Lithuania	28 May 1992
74	Belarus	4 June 1992
75	Kazakhstan	30 July 1992
76	Slovenia	17 August 1992
77	Latvia	21 October 1992
78	Armenia	26 February 1993
79	Slovakia	7 April 1993
80	South Africa	4 April 1994
81	Israel	27 July 1994
82	Croatia	19 August 1994
83	Iran	November 1994
84	Singapore	6 October 1995
85	Bosnia and Herzegovina	18 October 1995
86	Marshall Islands	1 December 1995
87	Malaysia	19 January 1996
88	Costa Rica	23 May 1996
—	Sovereign Military Order of Malta	1996
89	Namibia	21 August 1996
90	Mauritius	8 November 1996
91	Jamaica	22 March 1999
92	Chile	20 October 1999
93	Philippines	21 March 2000
94	Cyprus	31 March 2000
95	Maldives	23 April 2003
96	Madagascar	9 October 2003
97	Azerbaijan	22 March 2004
98	Moldova	2 September 2004
99	North Macedonia	10 December 2004
100	Bahrain	17 March 2005
101	Qatar	23 March 2005
102	Oman	22 May 2006
103	Andorra	30 June 2006
104	United Arab Emirates	July 2006
105	Guatemala	25 July 2006
106	Venezuela	20 September 2006
107	Saudi Arabia	14 March 2007
108	Saint Vincent and the Grenadines	30 June 2007
109	Dominican Republic	28 September 2007
110	São Tomé and Príncipe	10 November 2008
111	Australia	22 September 2009
112	Timor-Leste	18 November 2009
113	Georgia	22 January 2010
114	Libya	February 2010
115	Sudan	30 May 2010
116	Ecuador	10 August 2010
117	Montenegro	17 December 2010
118	Denmark	17 February 2011
119	Solomon Islands	26 May 2011
120	Fiji	2 April 2012
121	Indonesia	5 December 2012
122	Mali	6 December 2012
123	Gabon	7 December 2012
124	Uruguay	10 September 2013
125	Burkina Faso	14 May 2014
126	Democratic Republic of the Congo	14 May 2014
127	Malta	17 March 2016
128	Rwanda	4 May 2017
129	Nepal	3 August 2017
130	Monaco	10 August 2017
131	Bangladesh	6 June 2018
132	Tajikistan	7 June 2018
133	Dominica	15 May 2019
134	San Marino	25 September 2019
135	Kyrgyzstan	26 September 2019
136	Ireland	19 March 2021
137	Panama	5 April 2021
138	Lebanon	20 May 2021
139	Barbados	21 July 2022
140	Saint Lucia	20 September 2022
141	Antigua and Barbuda	22 September 2022
142	Palau	22 September 2022
143	Bahamas	8 December 2022
144	Suriname	12 December 2022
145	Trinidad and Tobago	14 March 2023
146	Guyana	4 April 2023
147	Samoa	9 May 2023
148	Belize	15 February 2024
149	El Salvador	15 February 2024
150	Comoros	25 April 2024
151	Saint Kitts and Nevis	10 May 2024
152	Uzbekistan	23 September 2024
153	Liechtenstein	2024
154	Burundi	19 June 2025
155	Grenada	25 September 2025
156	Botswana	25 February 2026
157	Niger	26 February 2026

== Bilateral relations ==
Country	Formal Relations Began	Notes
Angola	30 October 1977	See Angola–Cape Verde relations Cape Verde signed a friendship accord with Angola in December 1975, shortly after Angola gained its independence. Cape Verde and Guinea-Bissau served as stop-over points for Cuban troops on their way to Angola to fight UNITA rebels and South African troops. Prime Minister Pedro Pires sent FARP soldiers to Angola where they served as the personal bodyguards of Angolan President José Eduardo dos Santos.: Angola has an embassy in Praia.; Cape Verde has an embassy in Luanda and a consulate in Benguela.
Brazil	5 December 1975	See Brazil–Cape Verde relations: Cape Verde has an embassy in Brasília.; Brazil has an embassy in Praia.
China	25 April 1976	See Cape Verde–China relations In January 2007, Manuel Inocêncio Sousa, Minister of Infrastructure, Transports and Sea, acknowledged the People's Republic of China's importance to Cape Verde stating: "China has been a friend of Cape Verde even before it gained independence from Portugal 30 years ago. Bilateral relations have been very good: in 2002, for example, the trade value between our two countries reached US $1.8 million, in Chinese exports of light industry products and miscellaneous goods.": Cape Verde has an embassy in Beijing.; China has an embassy in Praia.
Czech Republic	28 October 1975 and 1 January 1993	Cape Verde is accredited to the Czech Republic from its embassy in Berlin, Germany.; Czech Republic is accredited to Cape Verde by its embassy in Lisbon, Portugal and an honorary consulate in Praia.
France	31 December 1975	See Cape Verde–France relations: Cape Verde has an embassy in Paris and a consulate-general in Nice.; France has an embassy in Praia.
Guinea-Bissau	5 July 1975	See Cape Verde–Guinea-Bissau relations The Republic of Guinea-Bissau is about 900 km south-east of Cape Verde in coastal West Africa. Both were colonies of the Portuguese Empire and they campaigned together for independence with a plan for unification, but the countries separated after 1980.: Cape Verde has an embassy in Bissau.; Guinea-Bissau has an embassy in Praia.
Hungary	16 July 1975	Both countries established diplomatic relations on 16 July 1975 Hungary is represented in Cape-Verde by its embassy in Lisbon, Portugal and an honorary consulate in Praia.
India	6 June 1977	See Cape Verde–India relations After Cape Verde became a Portuguese colony in the 15th century, it became an important transit point for trade routes from Europe to India and Australia. The Embassy of India in Dakar, Senegal is concurrently accredited to Cape Verde. Cape Verde maintains an Honorary Consulate General in New Delhi. Foreign Minister Jose Brito was the first Cape Verdean minister to visit India in November 2009. Minister of State for Rural Development Sudarshan Bhagat visited Cape Verde in September 2015 as the Prime Minister's Special Envoy. Bhagat invited Cape Verde to send a delegation to attend the third India Africa Forum Summit. Foreign Minister Tolentini Araujo Jorge led the Cape Verdean delegation to participate in the Summit in New Delhi in October 2015. Bilateral trade between Cape Verde and India totaled US$4.20 million in 2014 to 2015, declining by 40.72% from the previous fiscal. India exported $1.43 million worth of goods to Cape Verde, and imported $2.77 million. The main commodities exported from India to Cape Verde are drugs, pharmaceuticals, plastic and linoleum products, and man-made fibers. IBSA provided a grant to refurbish a healthcare Centre in Cape Verde. India provided a line of credit worth $5 million to establish a Technology Park in the country. India donated $50,000 in 2010 to help the Government of Cape Verde to fight dengue fever, and supplied computers for the Government's "A New World" programme in October 2012. Citizens of Cape Verde are eligible for scholarships under the Indian Technical and Economic Cooperation Programme and the Indian Council for Cultural Relations. A small Indian community resides in Cape Verde.
Indonesia		Indonesia is represented in Cape Verde by its embassy in Dakar.
Mexico	19 February 1976	Both countries established diplomatic relations on 19 February 1976: Cape Verde is accredited to Mexico from its embassy in Washington, D.C., United States.; Mexico is accredited to Cape Verde from its Permanent Mission to the United Nations in New York City.
Portugal	18 July 1975	See Cape Verde–Portugal relations Both countries established diplomatic relations on 6 July 1975 when Chargé d'Affaires of Portugal Embassy in Praia Manuel António Pacheco Jorge Barreiros presented letters of credentials: Cape Verde has an embassy in Lisbon.; Portugal has an embassy in Praia.
São Tomé and Príncipe	10 November 2008	Cape Verde has an embassy in São Tomé.; São Tomé and Príncipe maintains an embassy in Praia.
South Africa	4 April 1994	Both countries established diplomatic relations on 4 April 1994: Cape Verde is accredited to South Africa from its embassy in Luanda, Angola.; South Africa is accredited to Cape Verde from its embassy in Dakar, Senegal.
South Korea	3 October 1988	Both countries established diplomatic relations on 3 October 1988 In 2011 Bilateral Trade were Exports $1,140,792 (Machineries, Automobile, Optical Instruments) Imports: $65,166.
Spain	21 December 1977	See Cape Verde–Spain relations: Cape Verde has an embassy in Madrid.; Spain has an embassy in Praia.
Turkey	24 June 1979	See Cape Verde–Turkey relations: The Turkish embassy in Dakar, Senegal is accredited to Cape Verde.; Trade volume between the two countries was $9.5 million in 2019.
Ukraine	25 March 1992	Both countries established diplomatic relations on 25 March 1992 Ukraine is represented in Cape-Verde by its embassy in Dakar, Senegal.
United Kingdom	1977	See Foreign relations of the United Kingdom The UK established diplomatic relations with the United Kingdom on 17 May 1977.: Cape Verde does not maintain an embassy in the UK.; The United Kingdom is not accredited to the Cape Verde through an embassy; the UK develops relations through its embassy in Lisbon, Portugal.; Both countries share common membership of the International Criminal Court, the United Nations, the World Health Organization, and the World Trade Organization.
United States	19 July 1975	See Cape Verde–United States relations The United States provided emergency humanitarian aid and economic assistance to Cape Verde in the period immediately following Cape Verde's independence, as well as after natural disasters, including a hurricane that struck the island of Brava in 1982, and after a severe volcanic eruption on Fogo in 1995. Cape Verde also is eligible for trade benefits under the African Growth and Opportunity Act (AGOA), and has signed an Open Skies agreement to facilitate air travel safety and expansion. On July 4, 2005, Cape Verde became the third country to sign a compact with the U.S. Government-funded Millennium Challenge Corporation (MCC); the five-year assistance package is worth over $110 million in addressing rural economic expansion, infrastructure development, and development of the credit sector.: Cape Verde has an embassy in Washington, D.C., and a consulate in Boston.; United States has an embassy in Praia.

== See also ==
- List of diplomatic missions in Cape Verde
- List of diplomatic missions of Cape Verde
- International organization membership of Cape Verde
- International recognition of Cape Verde
