= List of diplomatic missions of Cape Verde =

This is a list of diplomatic missions of Cape Verde, excluding honorary consulates. Cape Verde has a small number of diplomatic missions.

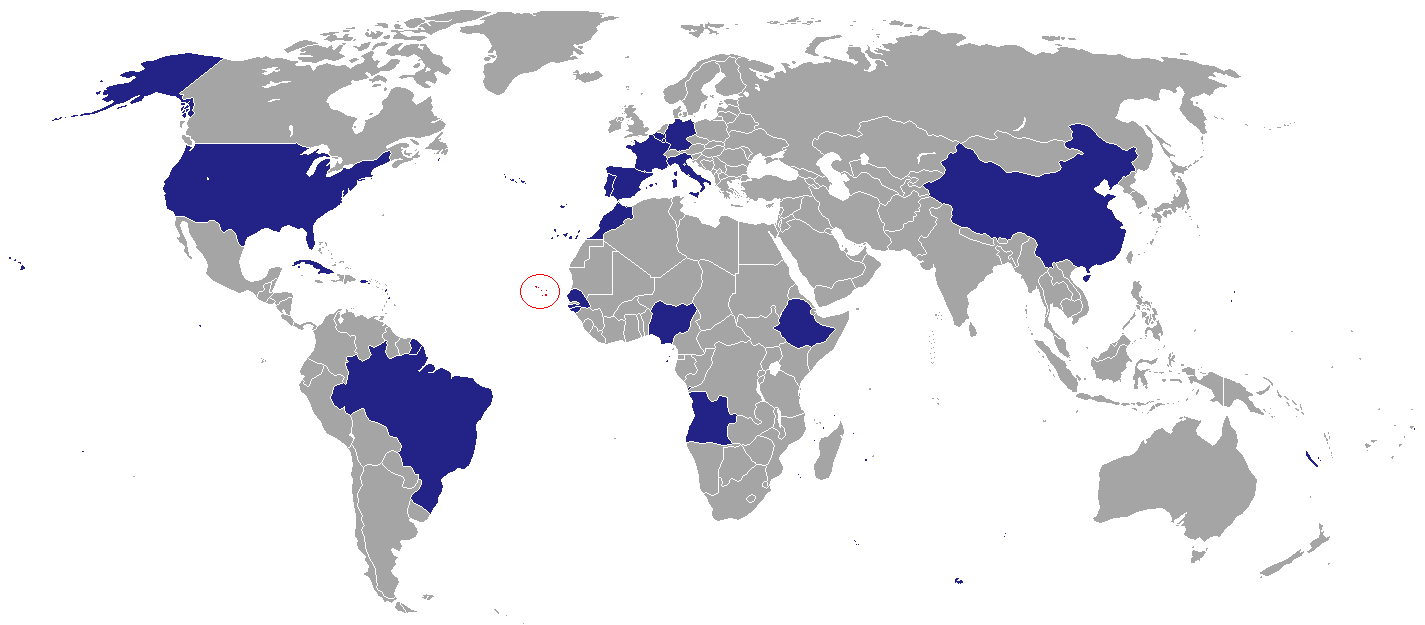
Map of countries with a Cape Verdean diplomatic presence

== Current missions ==
=== Africa ===
Host country	Host city	Mission	Concurrent accreditation	Ref.
Angola	Luanda	Embassy	Countries: Botswana; Mozambique; Namibia; Seychelles; South Africa; Zimbabwe	
Angola	Benguela	Consulate	Countries: Botswana; Mozambique; Namibia; Seychelles; South Africa; Zimbabwe	
Ethiopia	Addis Ababa	Embassy	International Organizations: African Union	
Guinea-Bissau	Bissau	Embassy		
Morocco	Rabat	Embassy		
Morocco	Dakhla	Consulate-General		
Nigeria	Abuja	Embassy	International Organizations: Economic Community of West African States	
São Tomé and Príncipe	São Tomé	Embassy	Countries: Equatorial Guinea	
Senegal	Dakar	Embassy	Countries: Burkina Faso; Gambia; Ivory Coast; Mali	

=== Americas ===
Host country	Host city	Mission	Concurrent accreditation	Ref.
Brazil	Brasília	Embassy	Countries: Argentina; Bolivia; Ecuador; Uruguay	
Cuba	Havana	Embassy		
United States	Washington, D.C.	Embassy	Countries: Canada; Mexico	
United States	Boston	Consulate-General	Countries: Canada; Mexico	

=== Asia ===
Host country	Host city	Mission	Concurrent accreditation	Ref.
China	Beijing	Embassy	Countries: Australia; India; Indonesia; Japan; Malaysia; New Zealand; Pakistan; Papua New Guinea; Philippines; Singapore; South Korea; Thailand; Vietnam	

=== Europe ===
Host country	Host city	Mission	Concurrent accreditation	Ref.
Belgium	Brussels	Embassy	Countries: Bulgaria; Hungary; Ireland; Netherlands; Romania; Slovenia; United Kingdom; International Organizations: European Union; Organisation for the Prohibition of Chemical Weapons	
France	Paris	Embassy	Countries: Monaco; International organizations: UNESCO	
France	Nice	Consulate-General	Countries: Monaco; International organizations: UNESCO	
Germany	Berlin	Embassy	Countries: Czechia; Denmark; Finland; Iceland; Norway; Poland; Russia; Sweden	
Italy	Rome	Embassy	Countries: Albania; Armenia; Bosnia and Herzegovina; Greece; Malta; Montenegro; North Macedonia; San Marino; Serbia; Turkey; International Organizations: Food and Agriculture Organization; International Fund for Agricultural Development; World Food Programme	
Luxembourg	Luxembourg City	Embassy		
Netherlands	Rotterdam	Consulate-General		
Portugal	Lisbon	Embassy	Countries: Holy See; International organizations: CPLP; Sovereign Entity: Sovereign Military Order of Malta	
Spain	Madrid	Embassy	Countries: Andorra	

=== Multilateral organizations ===
Organization	Host city	Host country	Mission	Concurrent accreditation	Ref.
United Nations	New York City	United States	Permanent Mission	Countries: Guatemala	
United Nations	Geneva	Switzerland	Permanent Mission	Countries: Austria; Switzerland; International Organizations: UNIDO	

== Gallery ==
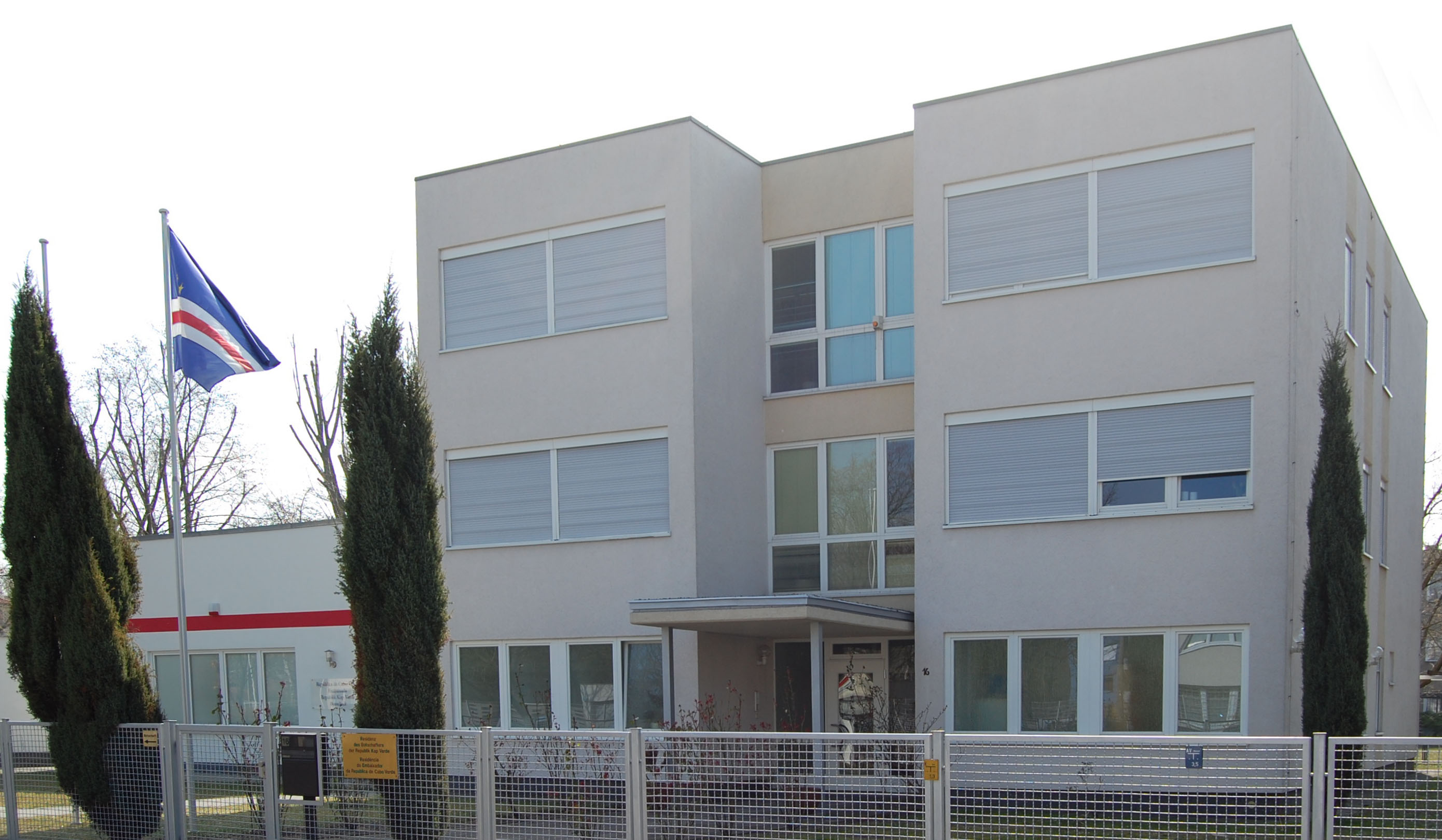
Embassy in Berlin

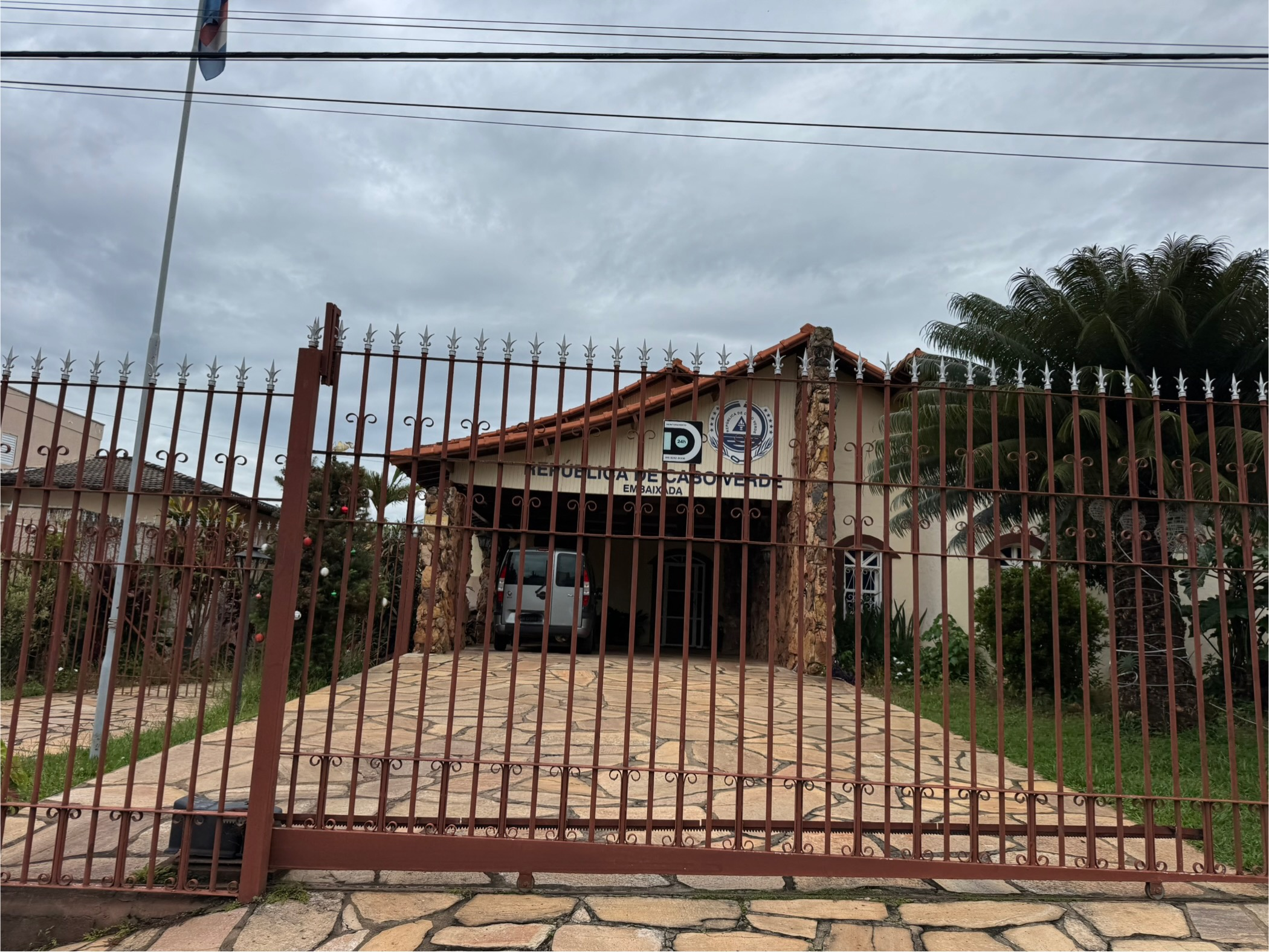
Embassy in Brasília

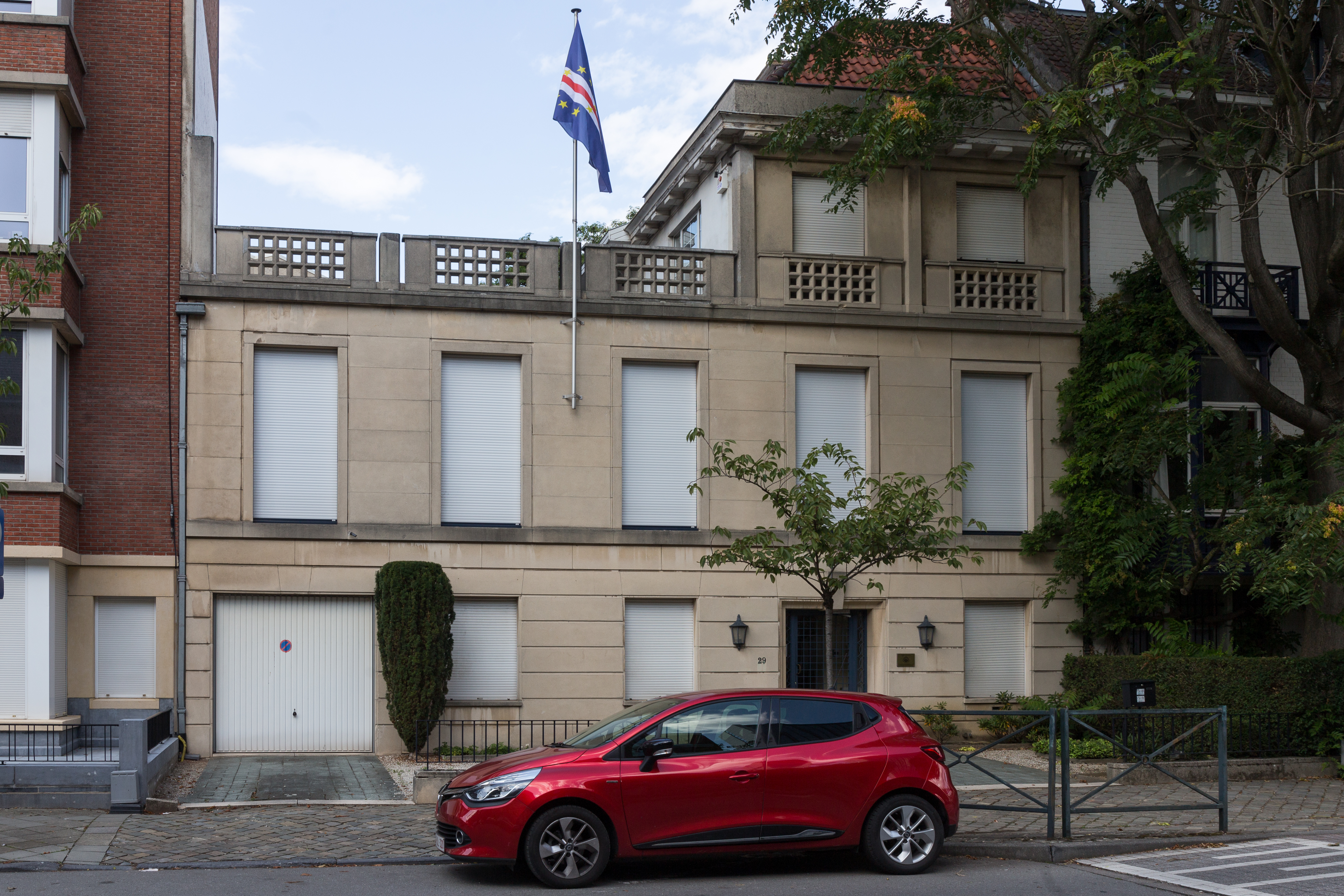
Embassy in Brussels

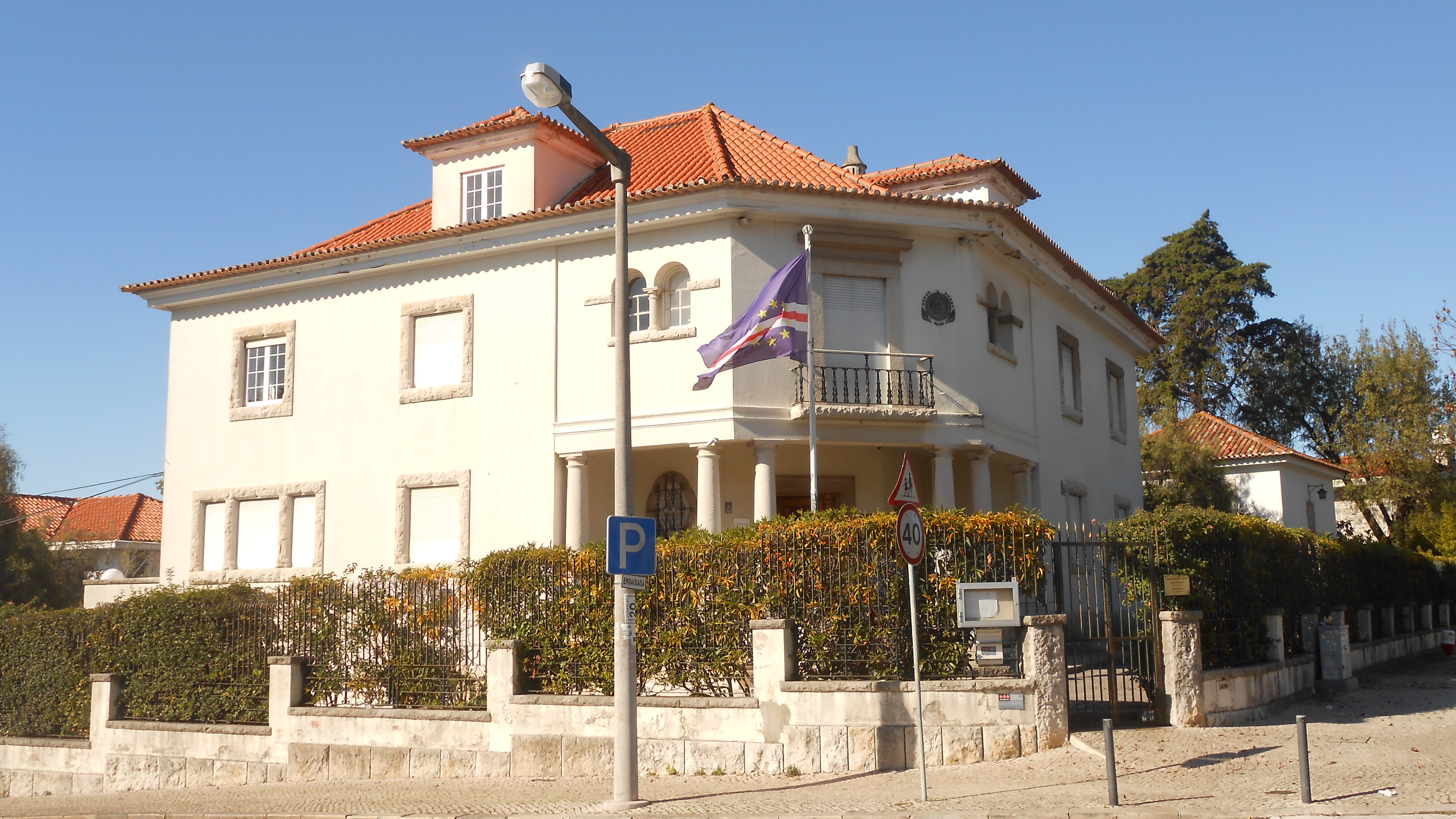
Embassy in Lisbon

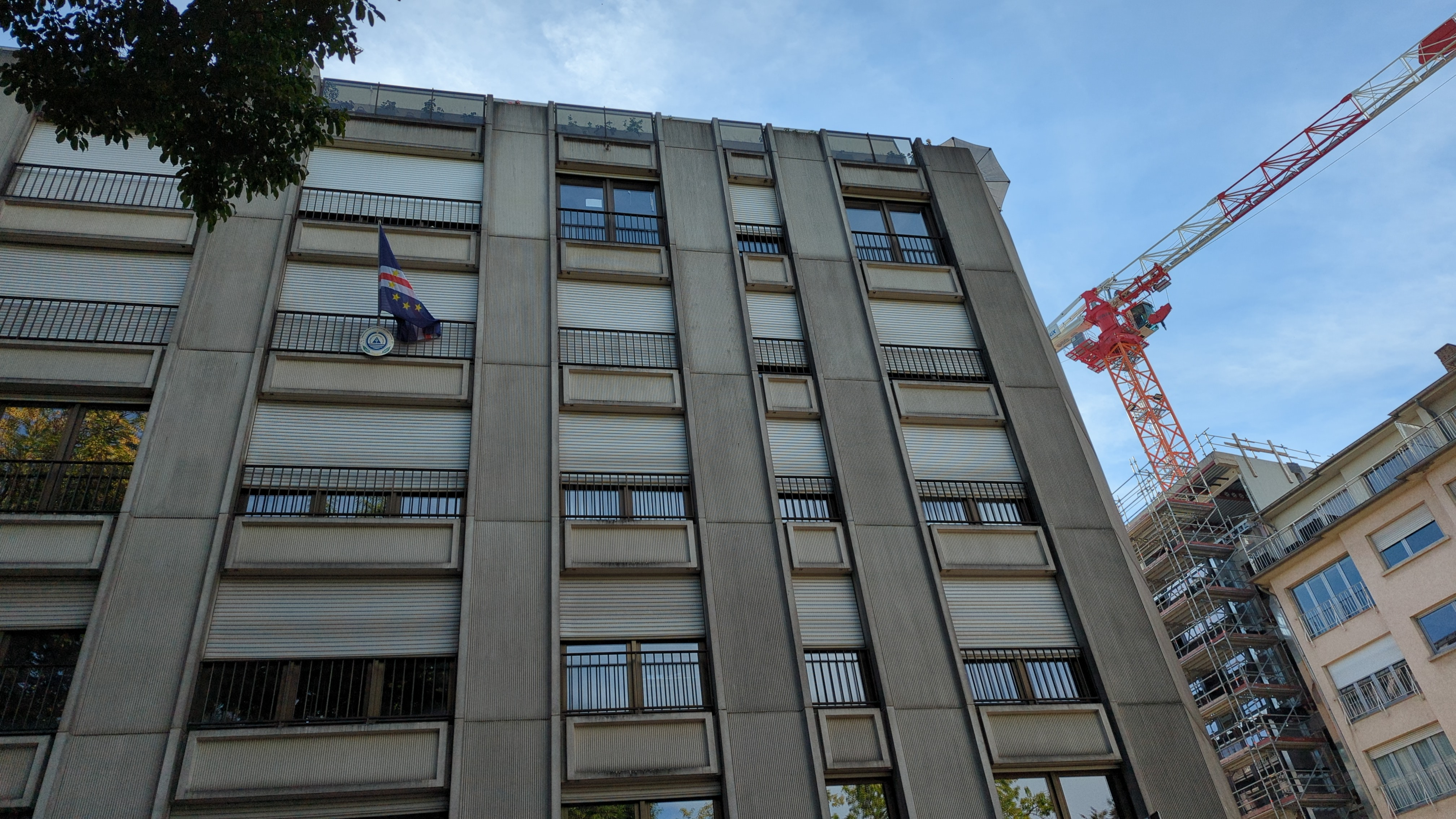
Embassy in Luxembourg

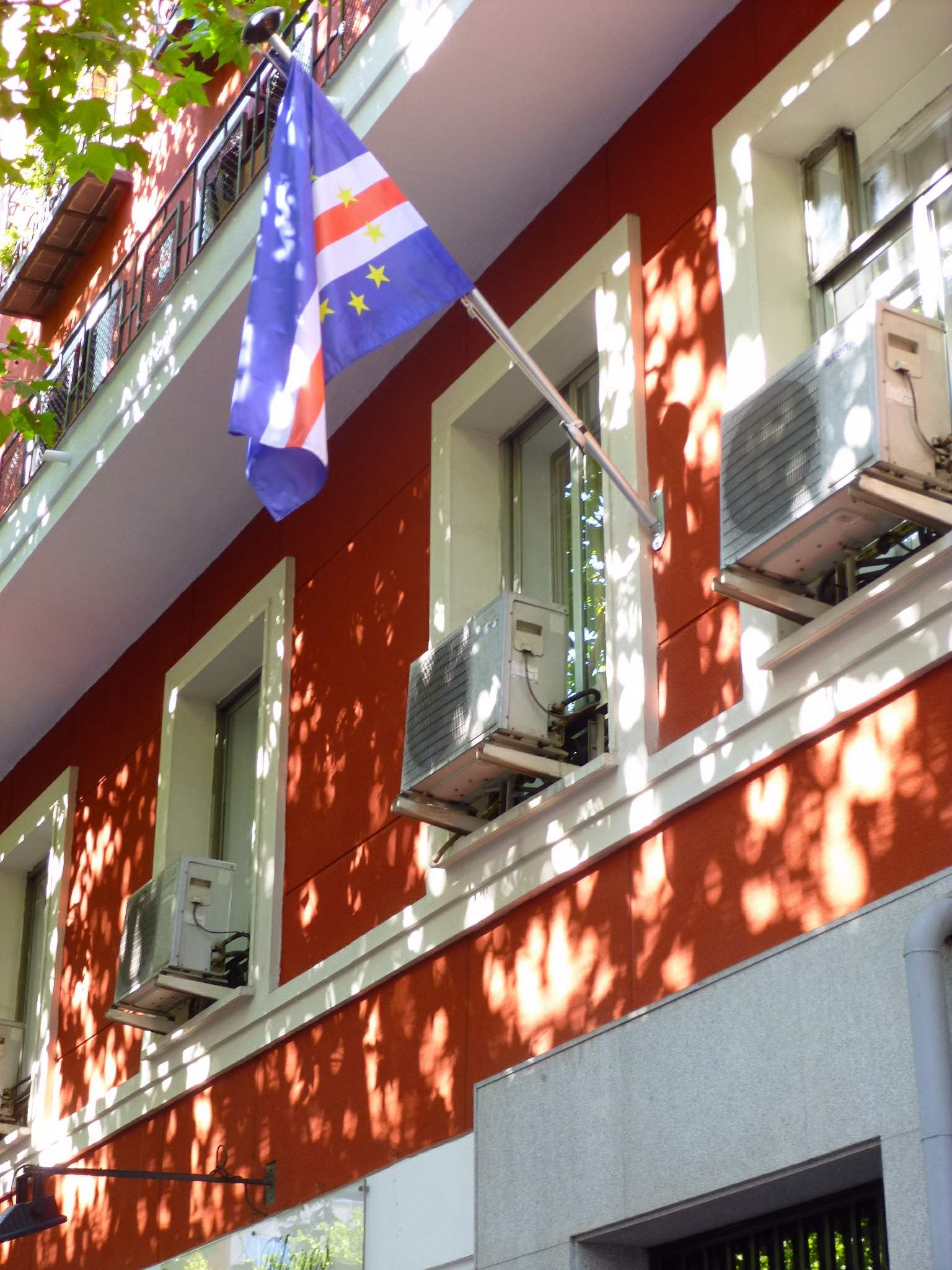
Embassy in Madrid

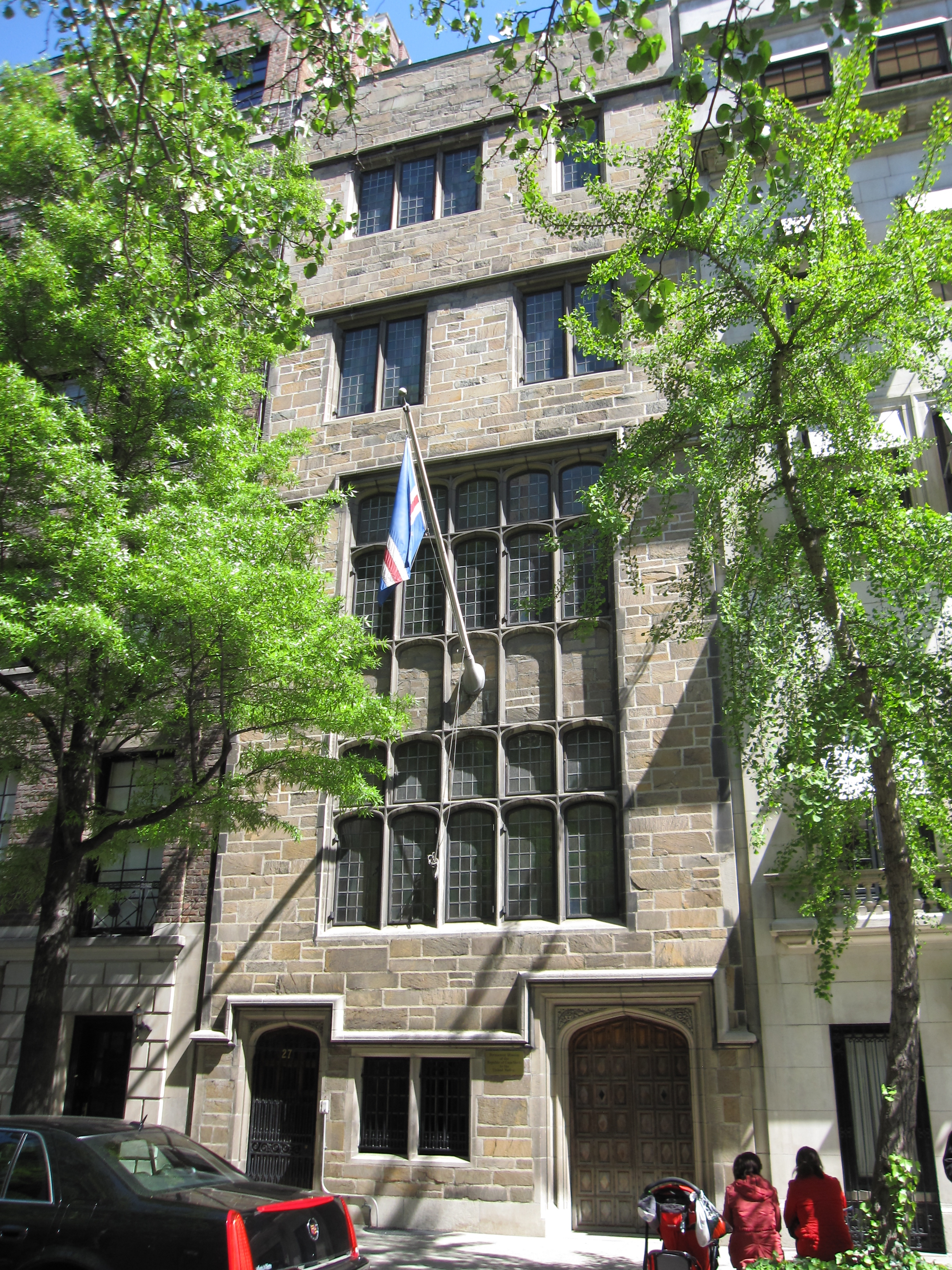
Permanent Mission to the United Nations in New York City

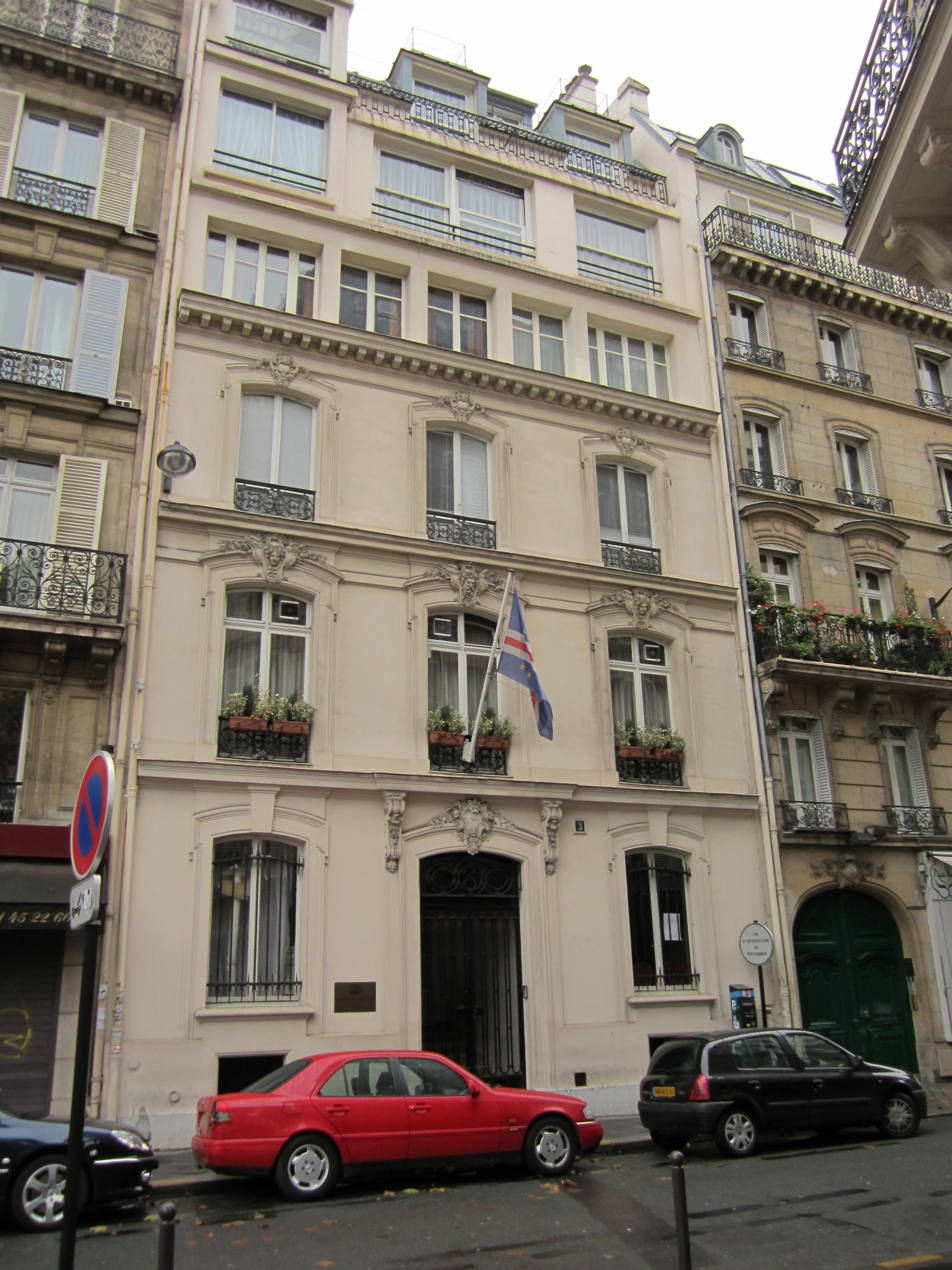
Embassy in Paris

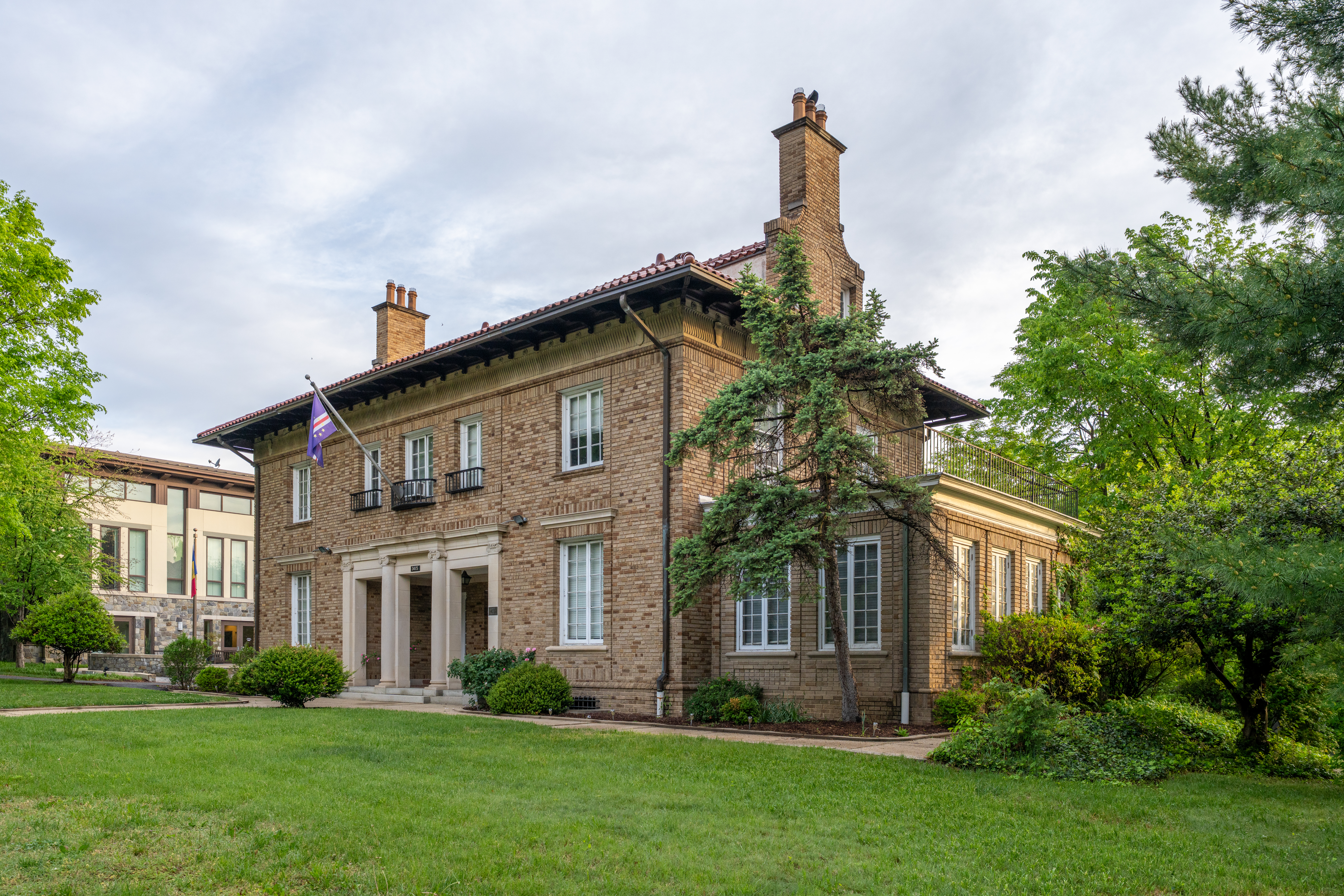
Embassy in Washington, D.C.

== Closed missions ==
=== Africa ===
Host country	Host city	Mission	Year closed	Ref.
Mozambique	Maputo	Embassy	2005	

=== Asia ===
Host country	Host city	Mission	Year closed	Ref.
China	Hong Kong	Consulate-General	2000	

=== Europe ===
Host country	Host city	Mission	Year closed	Ref.
Austria	Vienna	Embassy	Unknown	

== See also ==
- Foreign relations of Cape Verde
- List of diplomatic missions in Cape Verde
- Visa policy of Cape Verde
