= Babcock–Macomb House =

Historic house in Washington, D.C., United States

- U.S. National Register of Historic Places
- D.C. Inventory of Historic Sites
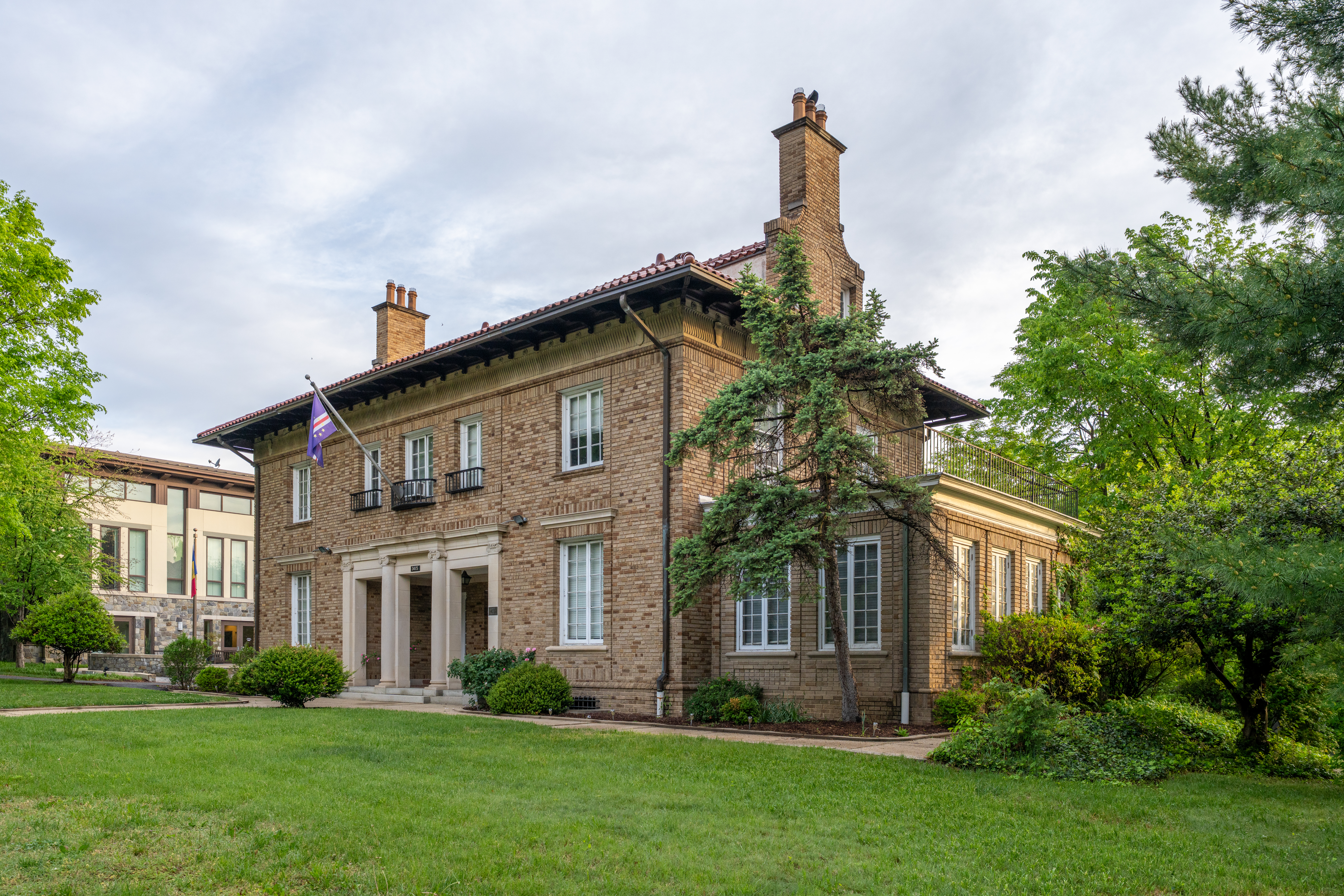

- Location within Washington, D.C.
- Location: 3415 Massachusetts Avenue, NW, Washington, D.C., U.S.
- Coordinates: 38°55′29″N 77°4′4″W
- Area: less than one acre
- Built: 1912
- Architect: Arthur B. Heaton
- Architectural style: Neo-Renaissance
- NRHP reference No.: 94001633

Significant dates
- Added to NRHP: February 10, 1995
- Designated DCIHS: February 1, 1989

The Babcock–Macomb House is a historical residence located at 3415 Massachusetts Avenue, NW, Washington, D.C.

Construction of the house was ordered by Kate Woodman Babcock, widow of former Representative Joseph W. Babcock of Wisconsin. Babcock had had a successful career in the lumber industry while serving two terms in the Wisconsin State Assembly. Upon taking office in the House of Representatives in 1893, Babcock was appointed to the Committee on the District of Columbia. In 1894 he was appointed as chairman. In this position, Babcock gained local popularity and substantial wealth, due to the committee's role in development of the city. Constance McLaughlin Green wrote that Babcock "cleared $400,000 in Washington real estate ... simply by using [his] advance knowledge of which sections of the city were to get funds..."

In 1911, Babcock's widow Kate purchased two lots in the newly laid out Massachusetts Heights subdivision, established when Massachusetts Avenue was extended beyond Florida Avenue. Mrs. Babcock purchased the two lots for $14,529 on October 18. The home was the first constructed in the neighborhood, which the city's planning committee hoped would attract the wealthy elite.

The architect was Arthur B. Heaton. Heaton opened his own office in Washington in 1900 at age 25. Between 1899 and 1906 he designed houses for the new Cleveland Park neighborhood. From 1908 to 1920 he served as supervising architect for the Washington National Cathedral. During this period, Heaton and his family lived in Cleveland Park, and he designed many buildings for the neighborhood. His residential designs used numerous styles, including Georgian, Colonial Revival, Spanish mission, and the Neo-Renaissance of the Babcock–Macomb House.

Mrs. Babcock never moved into the new home. In 1917 she sold it to Tucker Sands, a vice president of the National Metropolitan Bank. Sands rented the house to tenants for two years, until he sold it in 1919 to Army Colonel Augustus Canfield Macomb. The Macomb family lived in the home until 1982, when Edna Wilson Macomb, widow of Alexander Macomb, sold the property to the Republic of Cape Verde, which has utilized it as their embassy to the United States.

== See also ==
- Cape Verde–United States relations
- List of diplomatic missions of Cape Verde
- National Register of Historic Places listings in the District of Columbia
