= Cape Verde–Turkey relations =

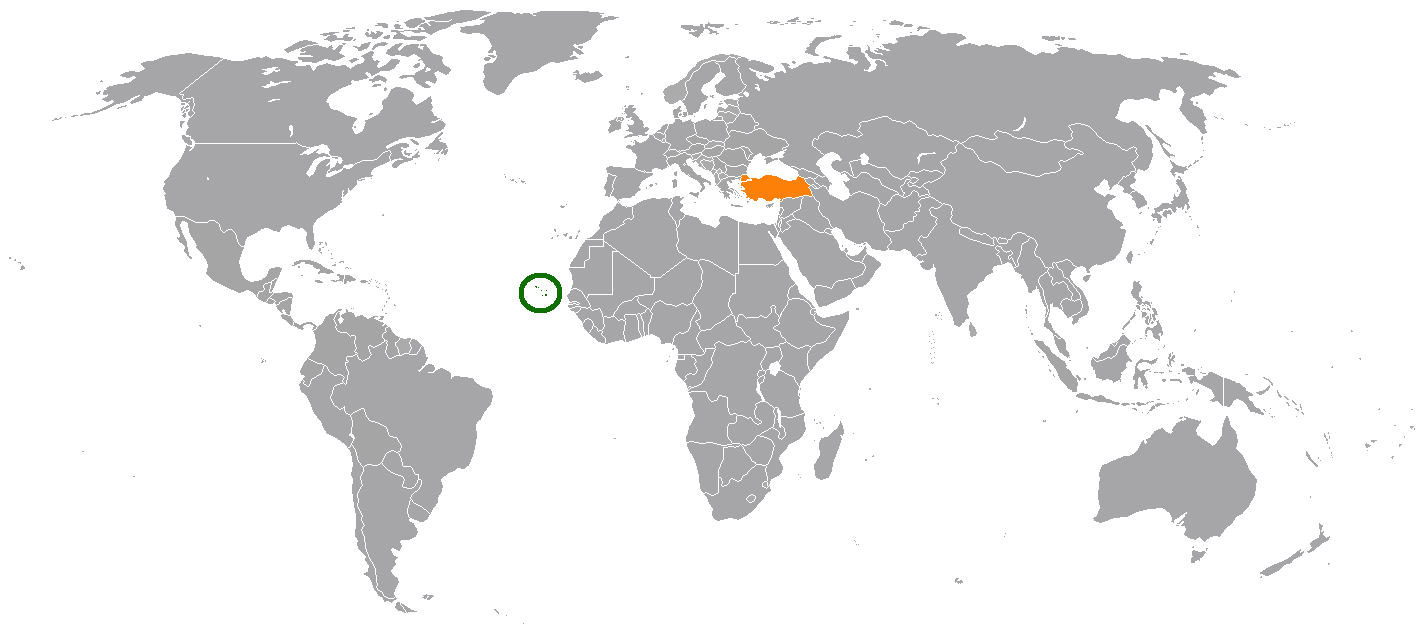

- Cape Verde: Turkey

Cape Verde–Turkey relations are the bilateral relations between Cape Verde and Turkey. The Turkish ambassador in Dakar, Senegal is also accredited to Cape Verde.

== Historical relations ==
Turkey has a relationship with Cape Verde spanning over 300 years.

The relations began with the arrival Sephardic Jews to Ottoman Empire, where they utilized their networks with other Sephardic Jews, including the anusim who came to establish a Jewish coastal presence in Cape Verde as lançados. In 1672, with the establishment of the Portuguese Inquisition in Cape Verde, there was a wave of migration of Sephardic Jews and anusim to the Ottoman Empire.

== Diplomatic relations ==
Relations became closer in 1977 when Turkey cooperated with the Lomé Convention and subsequently the Cotonou Agreement to send developmental aid to Cape Verde and funds to facilitate the restoration of landmarks in Praia. This was welcomed by Partido Africano da Independência de Cabo Verde, the political descendant Partido Africano da Independência da Guiné e Cabo Verde, which championed a closer bilateral political and economic relationship.

== Economic relations ==
Trade volume between the two countries was 9.5 million USD in 2019.

== See also ==
- Foreign relations of Cape Verde
- Foreign relations of Turkey
