= Brazil–Cape Verde relations =

- Brazil: Cape Verde

Brazil–Cape Verde relations are the bilateral relations between Brazil and Cape Verde. Both nations are members of the Community of Portuguese Language Countries, Group of 77 and the United Nations.

== History ==
Both Brazil and Cape Verde were united for three hundred years as part of the Portuguese Empire. As part of the Portuguese Empire, Cape Verde was used as launching point during the Atlantic slave trade from continental Africa to Brazil. From 1815 to 1822, Cape Verde was administered by Brazil during the Transfer of the Portuguese court to Brazil.

In July 1975, Cape Verde obtained its Independence from Portugal. That same year, Brazil and Cape Verde established diplomatic relations. In 1977, both nations signed a Basic Cooperation Agreement and in 1979, both nations signed a Friendship and Cooperation Treaty and Cultural Cooperation Agreement. In 1983, Brazilian President João Figueiredo paid an official visit to Cape Verde, the first for a Brazilian President. The visit was reciprocated in 1985 with the visit to Brazil by Cape Verdean President Aristides Pereira. There have been numerous high-level visits between leaders of both nations since the initial visits.

Cape Verde is currently one of the biggest cooperation partners in projects developed primarily with funds from the Brazilian Cooperation Agency. The country has also taken advantage of the opportunities offered by the Undergraduate and Postgraduate Student Agreement Program and has annually sent hundreds of students to Brazil. Diplomats and military officers from Cape Verde have also traditionally attended training courses in Brazil.

== High-level visits ==
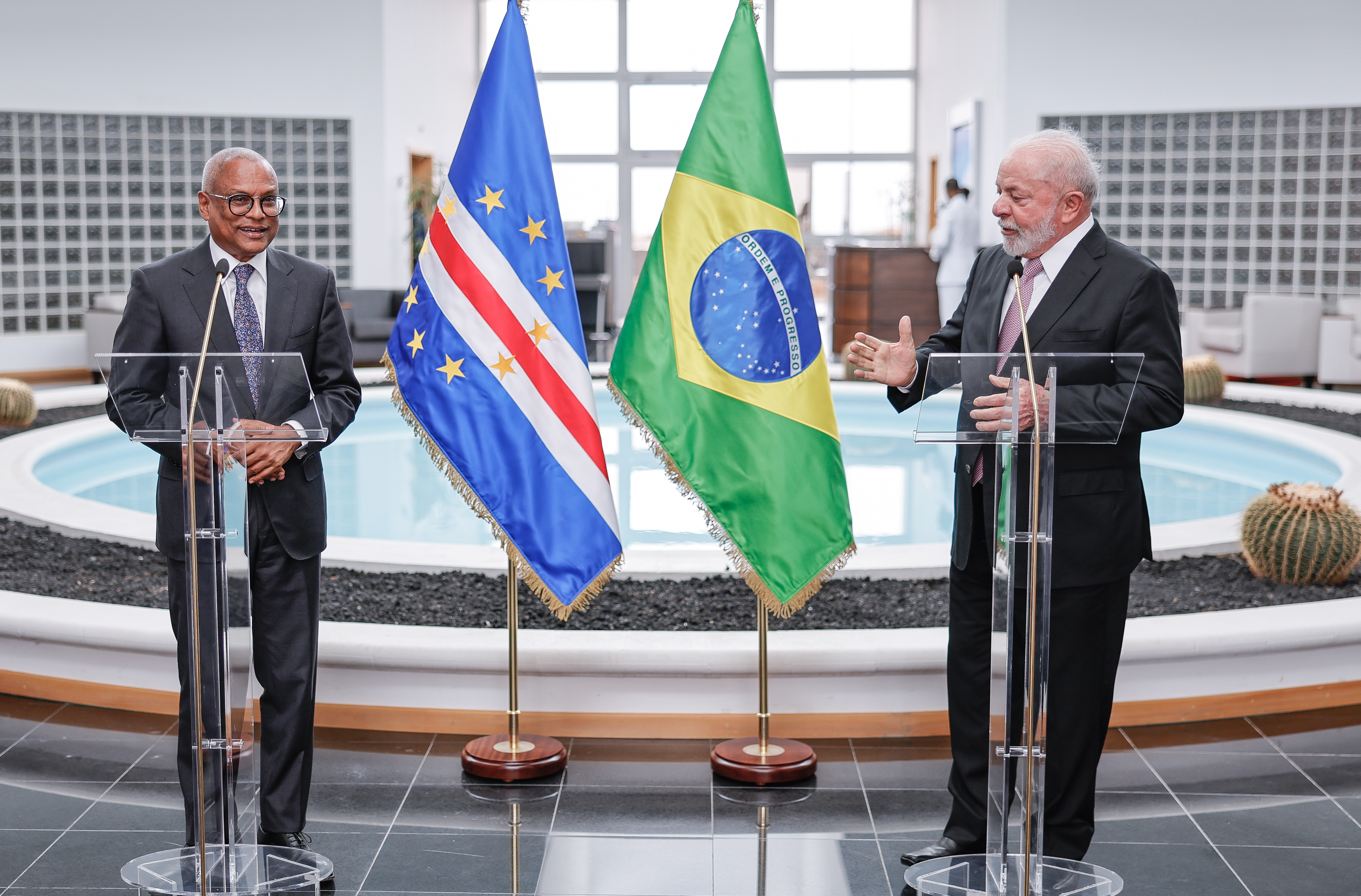
President José Maria Neves and President Lula da Silva in Praia; July 2023.

High-level visits from Brazil to Cape Verde

- President João Figueiredo (1983)
- President José Sarney (1986)
- President Luiz Inácio Lula da Silva (2004, 2010, 2023)
- Foreign Minister Mauro Vieira (2015, 2023)
- Foreign Minister José Serra (2016)
- President Michel Temer (2018)
- Foreign Minister Ernesto Araújo (2019)

High-level visits from Cape Verde to Brazil

- President Aristides Pereira (1985, 1987, 1990)
- President António Mascarenhas Monteiro (1992)
- President Pedro Pires (2002, 2003, 2005, 2006, 2007)
- Prime Minister José Maria Neves (2003, 2005, 2009)
- Foreign Minister José Brito (2011)
- Foreign Minister Jorge Alberto da Silva Borges (2012)
- President Jorge Carlos Fonseca (2019, 2021)
- President José Maria Neves (2022, 2023)
- Prime Minister Ulisses Correia e Silva (2023)

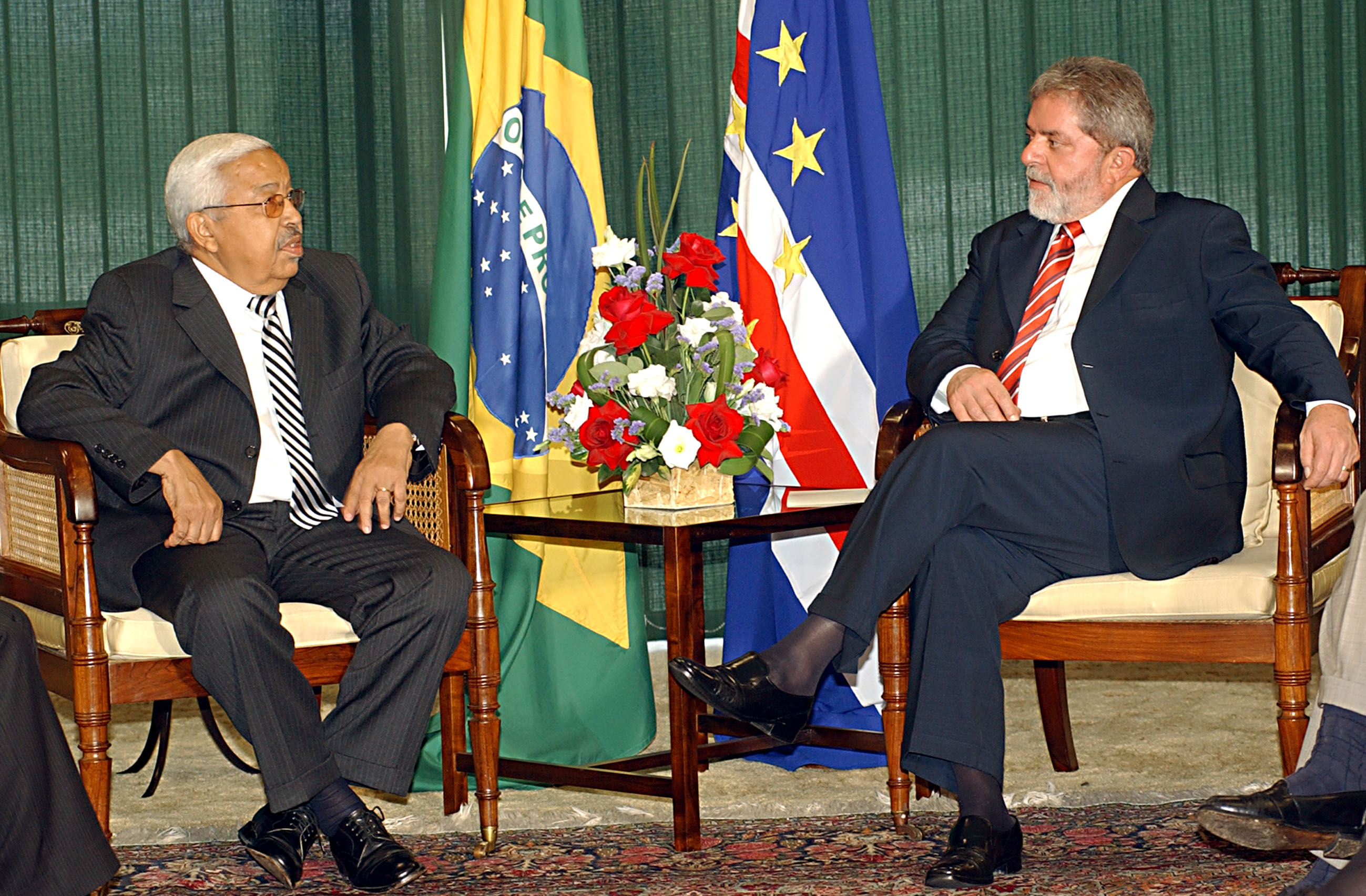
President Luiz Inácio Lula da Silva and Cape Verdean President Pedro Pires in Brasília; 2005.

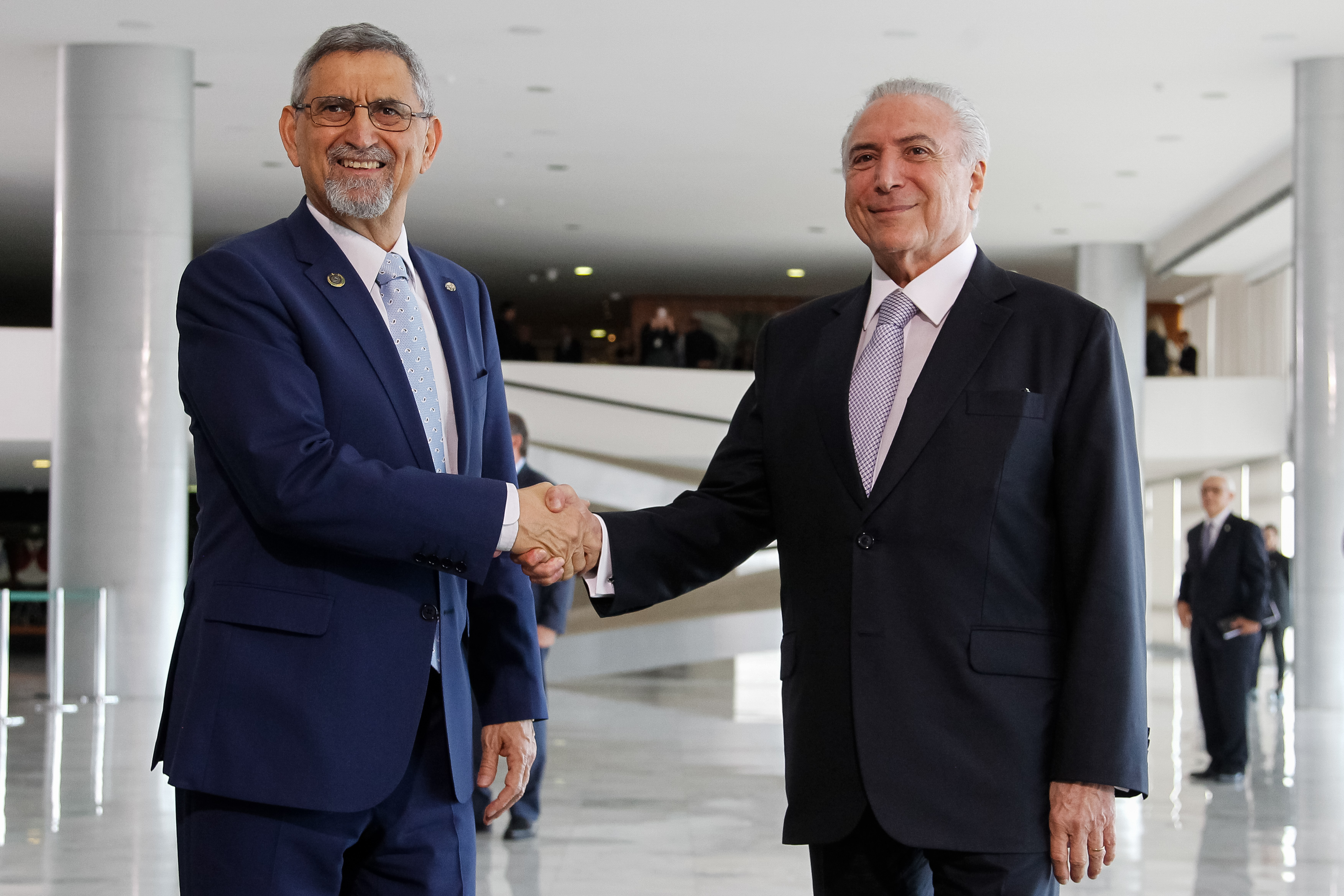
President Jorge Carlos Fonseca and President Michel Temer in Brasília; 2018.

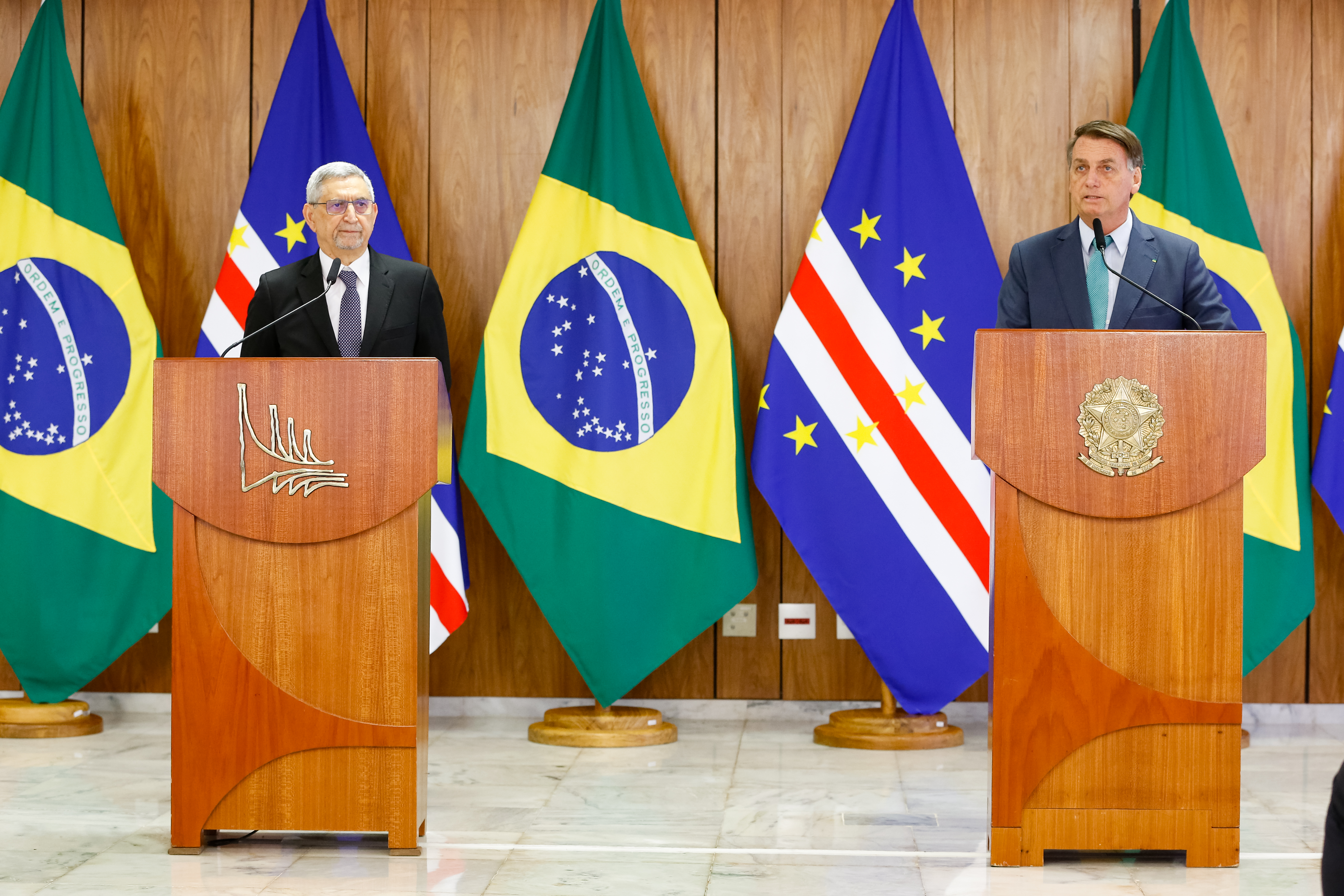
President Jorge Carlos Fonseca and President Jair Bolsonaro in Brasília; 2021.

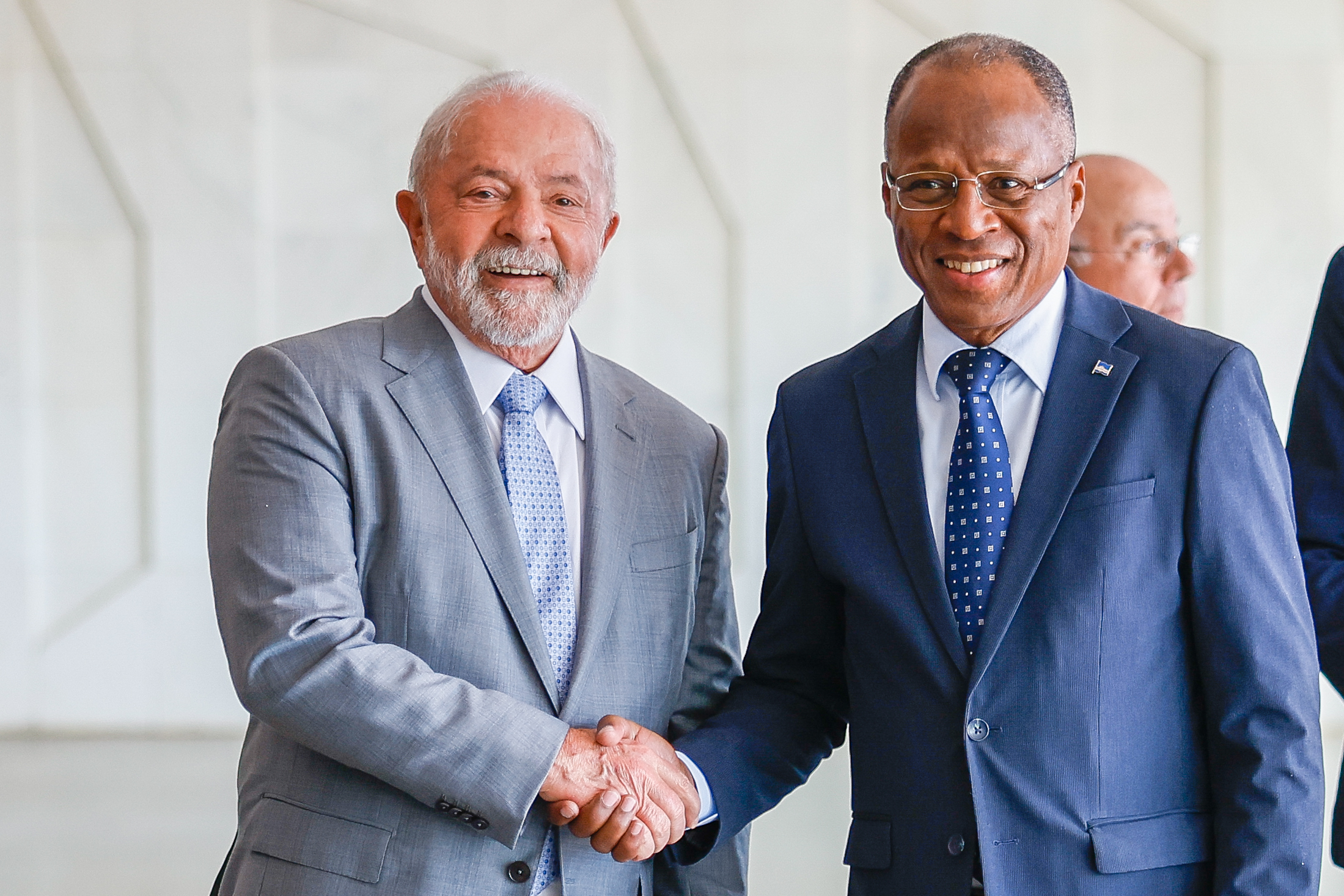
President Lula da Silva and Prime Minister Ulisses Correia e Silva in Brasília; May 2023.

== Resident diplomatic missions ==
- Brazil has an embassy in Praia.
- Cape Verde has an embassy in Brasília.
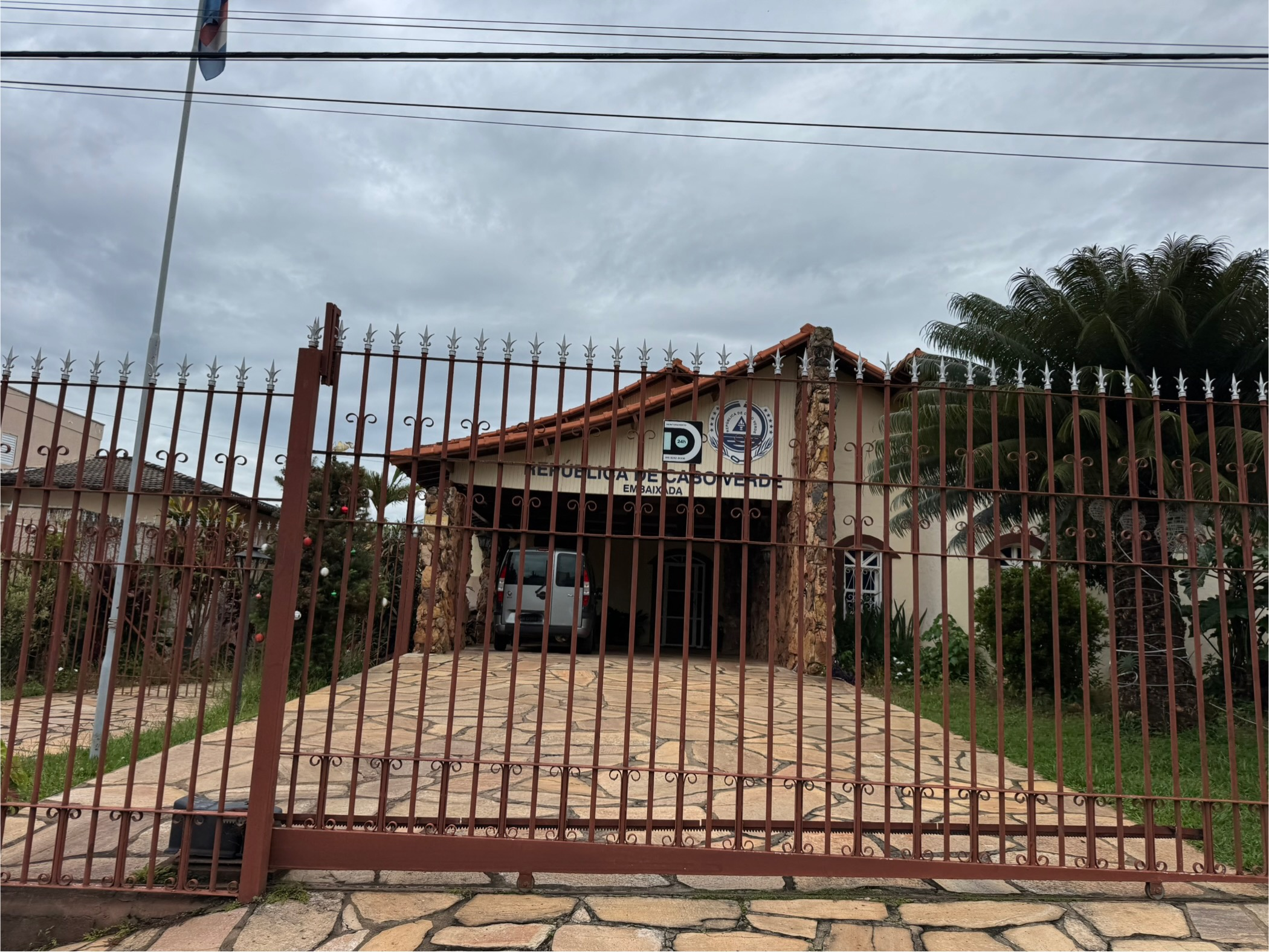
Embassy of Cape Verde in Brasília

== See also ==
- Foreign relations of Brazil
- Foreign relations of Cape Verde
- Lusofonia Games
- United Kingdom of Portugal, Brazil and the Algarves
