= Cape Verde–United States relations =

- Cape Verde: United States

Cape Verde–United States relations are the international relations between Cape Verde and the United States.

== History ==
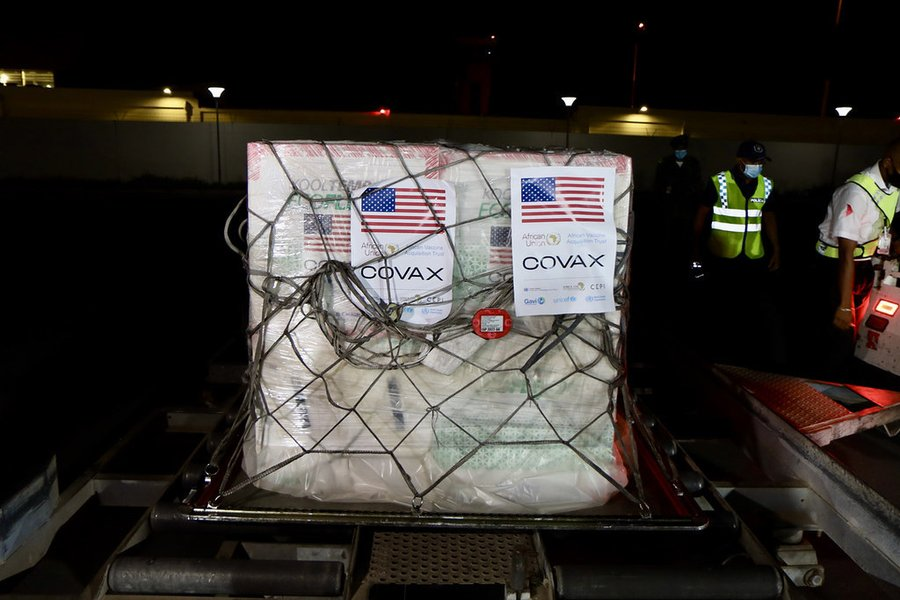
COVID-19 vaccines from the US arrive in Cape Verde as part of the COVAX program in 2021

The relationship is cordial and has strong historical roots. In the early 18th century, U.S. whaling ships appear to have begun recruiting crews from Brava and Fogo to hunt whales that were abundant in the waters surrounding Cape Verde. Ties between the American colonies and Cape Verde are documented as early as the 1740s, when American ships routinely anchored in Cape Verdean ports to trade for salt or buy slaves. The tradition of emigration to the United States began at that time and continues today.

The first U.S. consulate in sub-Saharan Africa was established in Cape Verde in 1818. U.S. consular representation continued throughout the 19th century. The United States recognised Cape Verde on its independence day and supported its admission to the United Nations. Cape Verde assigned one of its first ambassadors to the United States, and a resident U.S. ambassador was posted to Cape Verde in 1983. Prime Minister Jose Neves visited Cape Verdean communities in New England during an official trip to the United States in 2002, and President Pedro Pires visited the United States in April 2005. (Prime Minister Neves also visited the U.S. in September 2007.)

The United States provided emergency humanitarian aid and economic assistance to Cape Verde in the period immediately following Cape Verde's independence, as well as after natural disasters, including a hurricane that struck the island of Brava in 1982, and after a severe volcanic eruption on Fogo in 1995. Cape Verde also is eligible for trade benefits under the African Growth and Opportunity Act (AGOA), and has signed an Open Skies agreement to facilitate air travel safety and expansion. On July 4, 2005, Cape Verde became the third country to sign a compact with the U.S. Government-funded Millennium Challenge Corporation (MCC); the five-year assistance package is worth over $110 million in addressing rural economic expansion, infrastructure development, and development of the credit sector.

In December 2024, U.S. President Joe Biden paid a visit to Cape Verde and met with Prime Minister Ulisses Correia e Silva and discussed the growing U.S.-Cabo Verdean relationship.

Cape Verde's geography means it is a prime refueling station for European and American planes, and it also cooperates in defense exercises and drug trafficking.

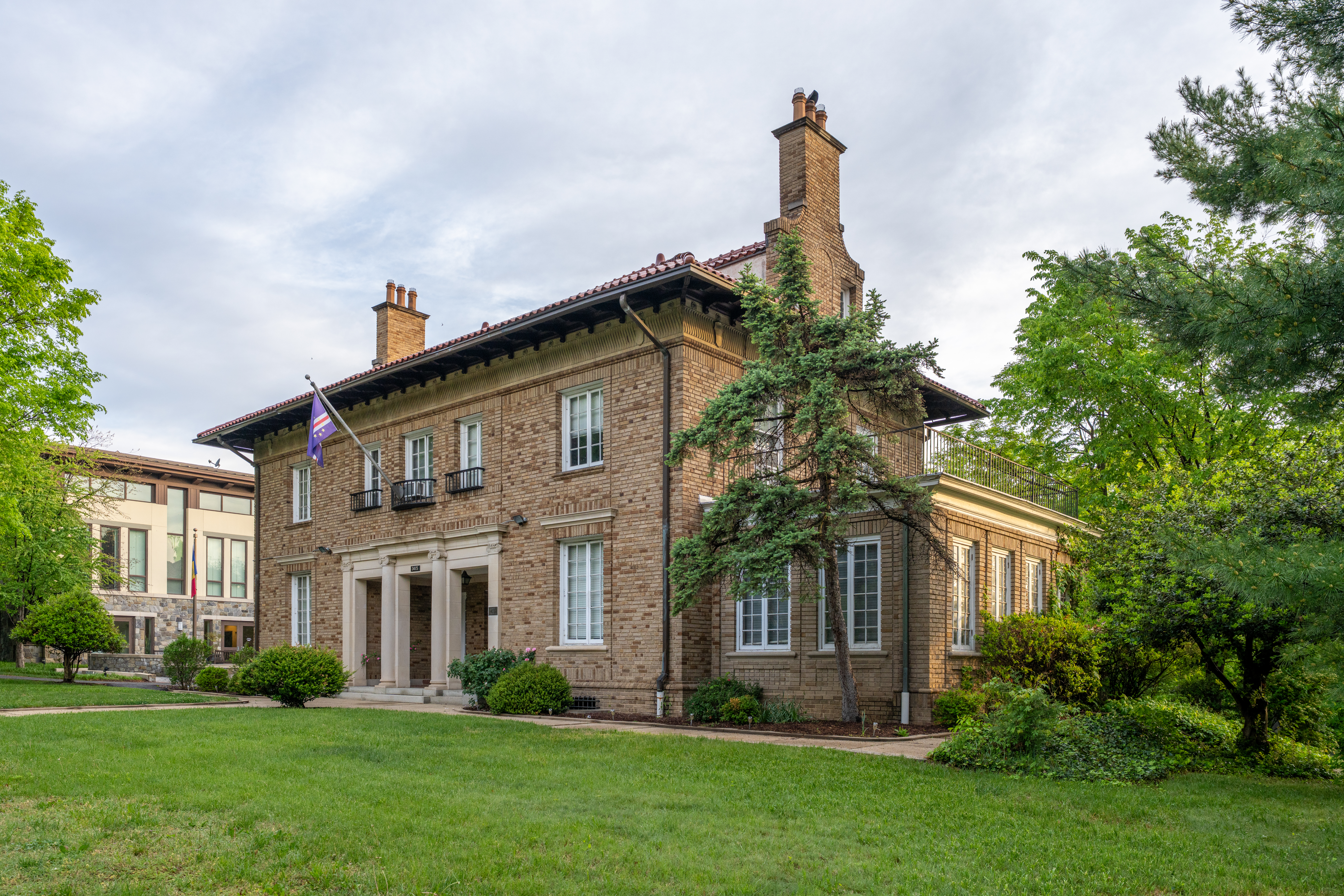
Embassy of Cape Verde in Washington, D.C.

== Resident diplomatic missions ==
- Cape Verde has an embassy in Washington, D.C., and a consulate-general in Boston.
- United States has an embassy in Praia.

== See also ==
- Cape Verdean American
- Embassy of Cape Verde, Washington, D.C.
- Foreign relations of Cape Verde
- Foreign relations of the United States
- List of ambassadors of Cape Verde to the United States
