= Cape Verdean Guinea-Bissauan =

Cape Verdean Bissau-Guineans
Total population
- Cape Verdean 2,000 0.1% of the Bissau-Guinean population

Regions with significant populations
- Bissau

Languages
- Portuguese, Cape Verdean Kriolu

Religion
- Christian (Protestant & Roman Catholic)

Related ethnic groups
- Cape Verdean diaspora

Cape Verdean Bissau-Guineans are Bissau-Guineans residents whose ancestry originated in Cape Verde.

As of 2007, the Instituto das Comunidades (Institute of the Communities) estimated that there were 2,000 people of Cape Verdean descent living in Guinea Bissau. The majority of them lived in the capital city of Bissau and could trace their Cape Verdean roots to the island of Santiago.

== Notable Bissau-Guineans& Cape Verdean ==
The most recognized in Cape Verdean Bissau-Guineans include:

- Amílcar Cabral, led the movement for Guinea Bissau & Cape Verdean independence with the PAIGC Party.
- Luís Cabral, first president of Guinea-Bissau
- Honório Barreto, first African governor of Guinea-Bissau, at the time known as Guine Portuguesa.
- Karyna Gomes, activist, journalist, and musician
- Carlos Lopes, assistant to Assistant Secretary-General and Director for Political Affairs in his Executive Office

== See also ==
- Cape Verde–Guinea-Bissau relations
