= Cape Verde–France relations =

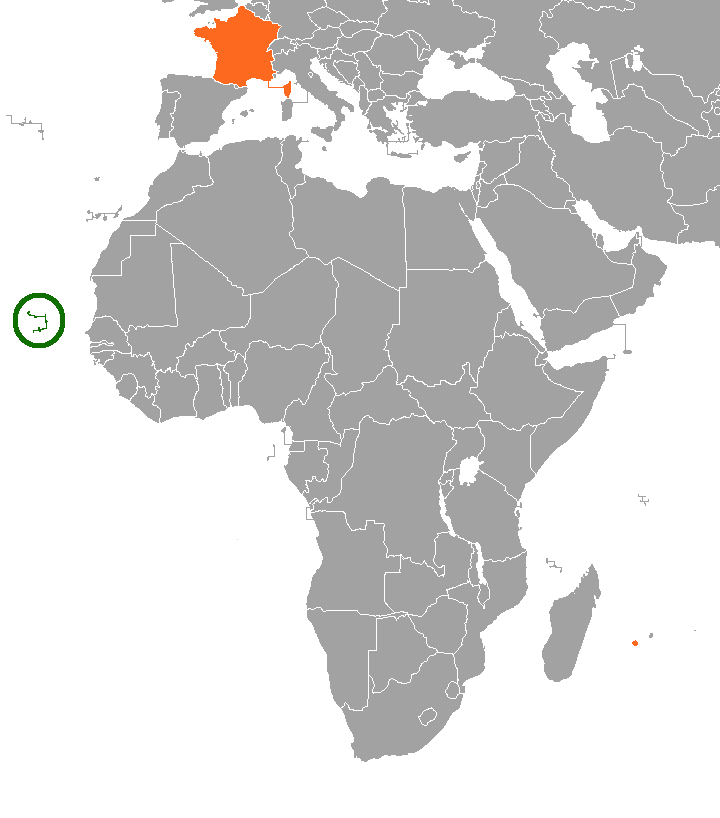

- Cape Verde: France

Cape Verde–France relations are the bilateral relations between France and Cape Verde.

== History ==
Cape Verde opened its embassy in Paris in 1996. In 2006, a partnership document was signed between the two countries which aims to frame the development of bilateral relations between the two countries. In 2008, a bilateral agreement was signed on development and migration.

== Economic development ==
In 2016, France exported 40 million euros worth of products to Cape Verde (compared to 11 million in 2015), which makes France the second biggest exporter. The Bolloré and Club Méditerranée are present in Cape Verde. The French Development Agency has been present and active in Cape Verde since its independence in 1975.

== Resident diplomatic missions ==
- Cape Verde has an embassy in Paris and a consulate-general in Nice.
- France has an embassy in Praia.

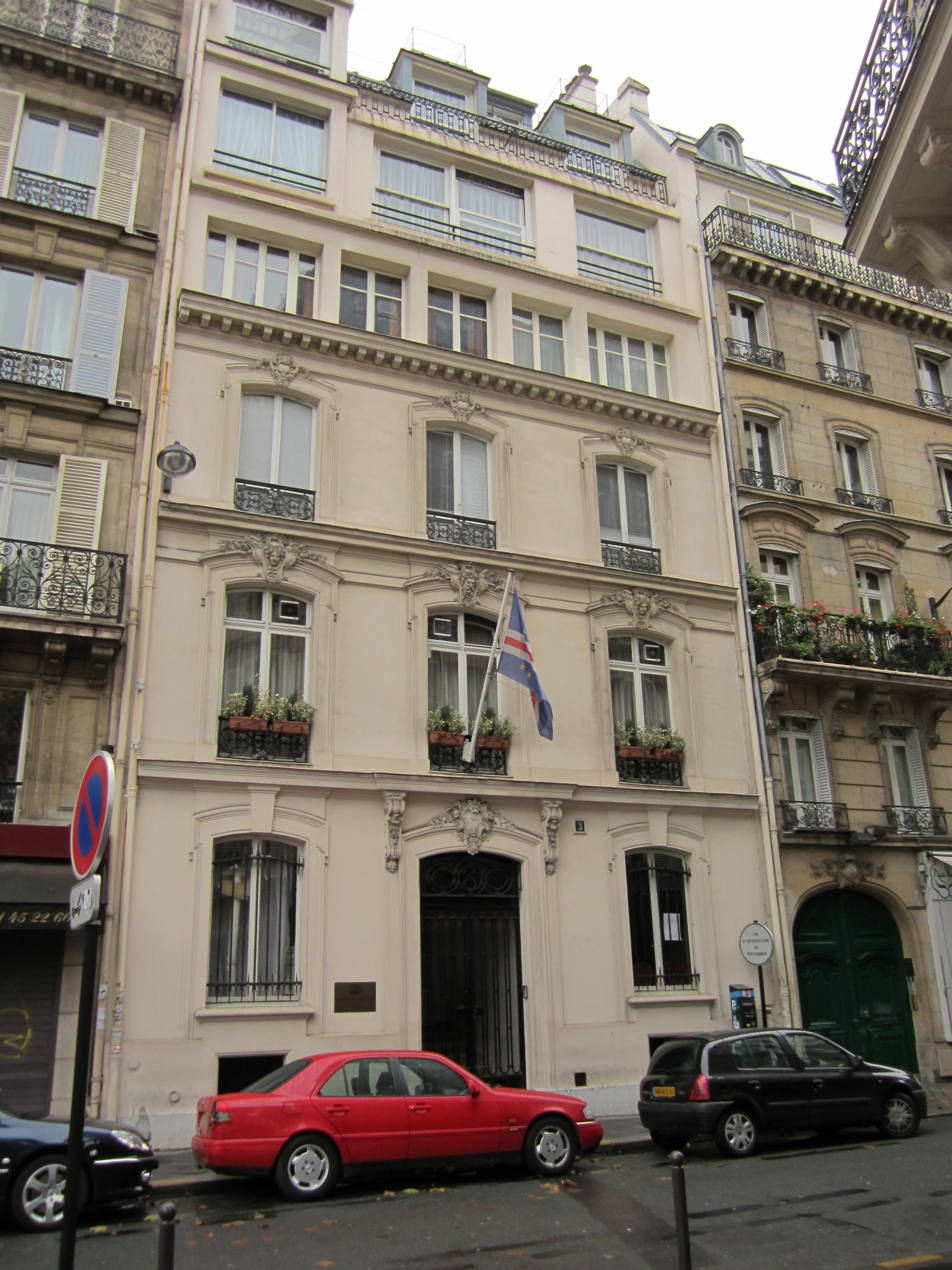
Embassy of Cape Verde in Paris

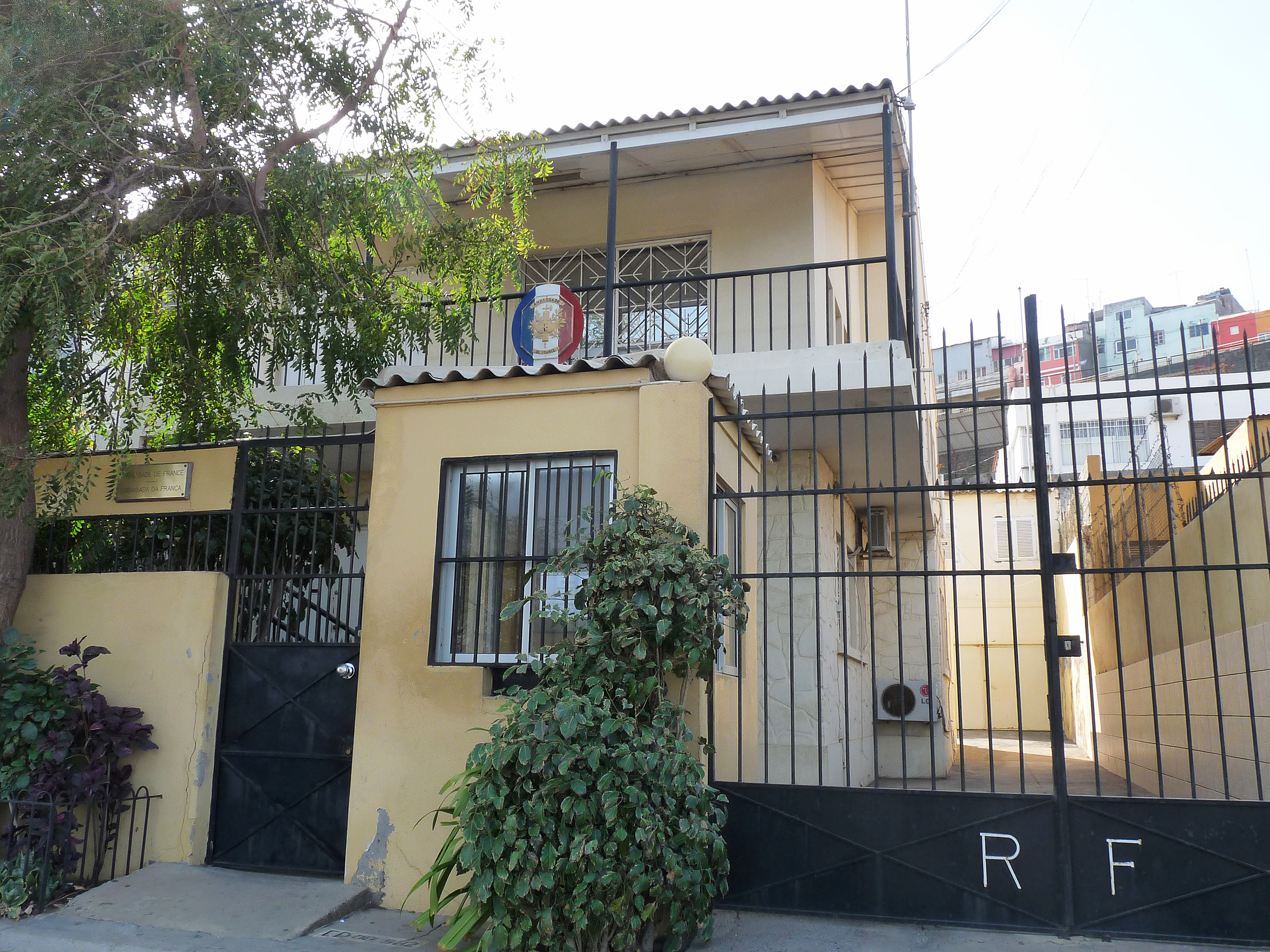
Embassy of France in Praia

== See also ==
- Foreign relations of Cape Verde
- Foreign relations of France
