= Cape Verde–Guinea-Bissau relations =

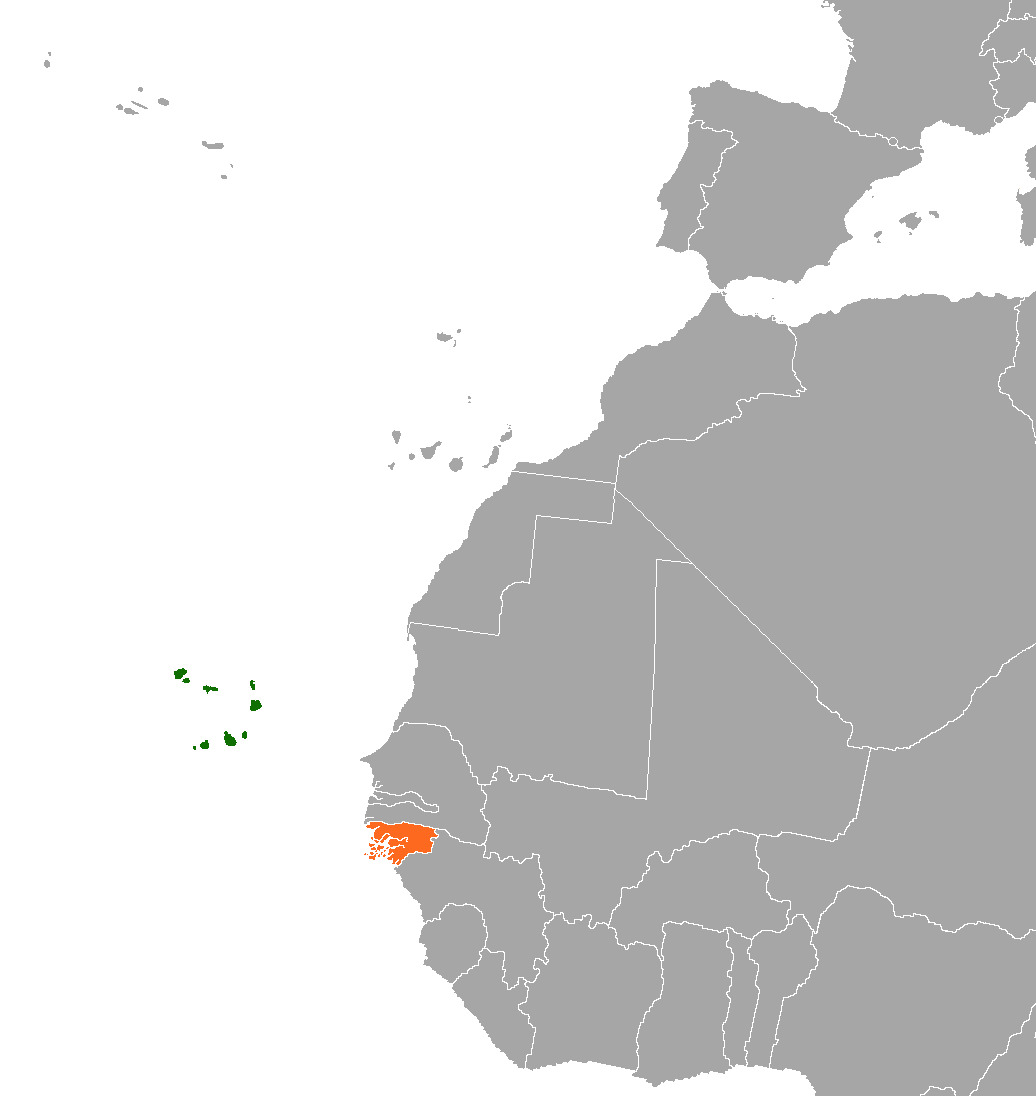

- Cape Verde: Guinea-Bissau

Cape Verde–Guinea Bissau relations refers to the bilateral relationship between the Republic of Cape Verde (Cabo Verde) and the Republic of Guinea-Bissau. Cape Verde is an island country about 900 km north-west of Guinea-Bissau, a coastal West African country. Both were colonies of the Portuguese Empire and they campaigned together for independence with a plan for unification, but the countries separated after 1980. The two countries were both founder members of the Community of Portuguese Language Countries (CPLP) in 1996, and are each members of the African Union and the Economic Community of West African States (ECOWAS).

== Colonial history ==
The area on the mainland under Portuguese rule now containing Guinea-Bissau was originally called "Guiné de Cabo Verde". Cape Verde was a site of transit in the slave trade from Guinea-Bissau to the Americas. Portuguese Cape Verde supplied many colonial officials for the mainland Portuguese Guinea, later Guinea-Bissau, at one point making up three-quarters of the civil service.

== Independence ==
Cape Verde and Guinea-Bissau campaigned together for independence from Portugal, chiefly led by Amílcar Cabral's Marxist African Party for the Independence of Guinea and Cape Verde (PAIGC) from 1956. Cape Verde provided the bourgeoisie that led the anti-colonial movement in Portuguese Guinea. An ideology of unity was key to Cabral's theory of African liberation, and Cabral was himself Cape Verdean Guinea-Bissauan, though the call for unity was partly a tactic to avoid Guinea-Bissau becoming independent without Cape Verde, as the latter had closer ties to Portugal. The PAIGC then fought the Guinea-Bissau War of Independence (part of the wider Portuguese Colonial War), and declared independence in 1973, being formally granted independence in September 1974. Cape Verde joined Guinea-Bissau in independence from Portugal when it peacefully negotiated independence on 5 July 1975, following the April 1974 Carnation Revolution in Portugal, and Aristides Pereira of the PAIGC became president. The intent was unification, as written into the two countries' constitutions. The PAIGC viewed them as "sister republics" with "two bodies with only one heart", and the countries shared a flag and national anthem.

However, the elites in Cape Verde opposed unification, there were constitutional and legal differences, and the trade between them was minor. On November 14, 1980, a coup d'état by João Bernardo Vieira against "foreign" mestiços overthrew the government of Luís Cabral (half-brother of Amílcar) in Guinea-Bissau, leading to Cape Verde separating under Pedro Pires on January 20, 1981 and forming the ruling African Party for the Independence of Cape Verde (PAICV).

== 1980s–2000s ==
From 1980 to 2000, during the Vieira presidency in Guinea-Bissau, the countries were less closely involved. Guinea-Bissau experienced a lack of development and periods of violence while Cape Verde was relatively stable. Guinea-Bissau was, like other "non-aligned" African states, closer to the Soviet Union, while Cape Verde, nominally Marxist, formed relations with Western countries due to a dependence on food imports following drought. Diplomatic relations were restored after the presidents met in June 1982, and an ambassador from Cape Verde was received by Guinea-Bissau in July 1983.

After multi-party politics was introduced in Cape Verde in 1990, the victorious Movimento para Democracia changed the flag and national anthem away from being similar to that of Guinea-Bissau.

In the 1998 Guinea-Bissau Civil War, triggered by a crackdown on Senagelese separatists in Guinea-Bissau, Cape Verde called for the withdrawal of troops from Senegal and Guinea-Conakry from Guinea-Bissau, there to support Viera. Cape Verde also opposed Viera's request for ECOWAS to send peacekeepers. Cape Verde took in refugees from Guinea-Bissau and helped to negotiate peace as part of the CPLP, with Cape Verdean foreign minister José Luís de Jesus chairing the discussions on a Portuguese warship that led to a ceasefire agreement. The Cape Verde president Peres also mediated during the violent 2005 presidential election campaign in Guinea-Bissau, and following the 2009 assassination of Vieira.

== Bilateral relations post 2010 ==
Relations have improved since the election of Malam Bacai Sanhá in Guinea-Bissau in 2009. The air connection between the countries operated by TACV, which had been suspended following the April 2012 coup in Guinea-Bissau, was restored in June 2015 during a visit of Cape Verdean Prime Minister José Maria Neves to Bissau to meet Domingos Simões Pereira and discuss economic and business relations. Neves had last visited in 2011. The countries signed an agreement on avoiding double taxation that September.

== Cultural relations ==
Cape Verde and Guinea-Bissau share the Portuguese language as their official language, and the Portuguese creole Crioulo language as a recognised language.

Cape Verdean Guinea-Bissauans have formed an Associação dos Filhos e Descendentes de Cabo Verde, and Guinea-Bissauan Cape Verdeans, who number around 8–9000, have formed an Associacao dos Guineeneses Residentes em Cabo Verde. Despite their shared language and culture, immigrants from Guinea-Bissau are often viewed as "manjacos", a derogatory term used for people from mainland Africa and the legalisation of Guinea-Bissauans in Cape Verde has been long delayed.

== Resident diplomatic missions ==
- Cape Verde has an embassy in Bissau.
- Guinea-Bissau has an embassy in Praia.

== See also ==
- Conference of Nationalist Organizations of the Portuguese Colonies
- Foreign relations of Guinea-Bissau
- Foreign relations of Cape Verde
- Cape Verdean Guinea-Bissauan
