= List of diplomatic missions in Cape Verde =

This is a list of diplomatic missions in Cape Verde. At present, the capital city of Praia hosts 17 embassies.

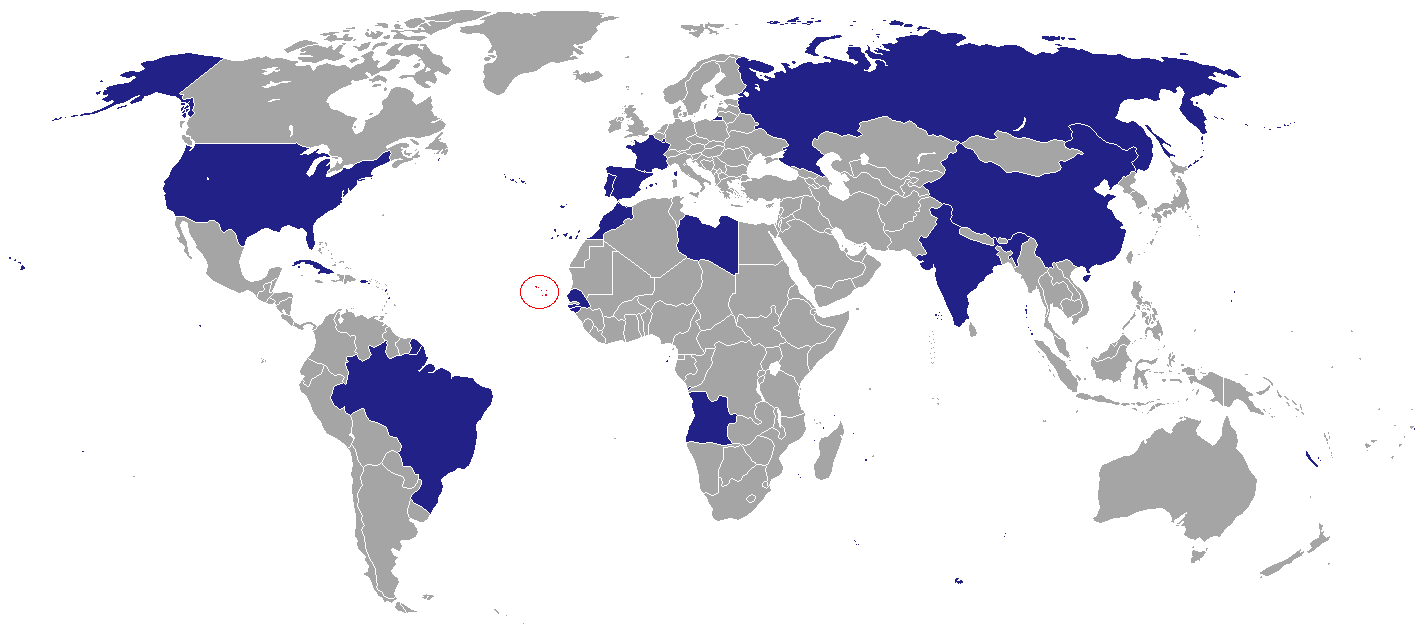
Map of diplomatic missions in Cape Verde

== Diplomatic missions in Praia ==
=== Embassies ===
1. Angola
2. Brazil
3. China
4. Cuba
5. France
6. Guinea-Bissau
7. India
8. Libya
9. Luxembourg
10. Morocco
11. Portugal
12. Russia
13. São Tomé and Príncipe
14. Senegal
15. Sovereign Military Order of Malta
16. Spain
17. United States

=== Other Delegations & Missions ===
1. ECOWAS (Representative Office)
2. European Union (Delegation)
3. United Nations (Resident Coordinator's Office)
4. World Health Organization (Country Office)

== Gallery ==
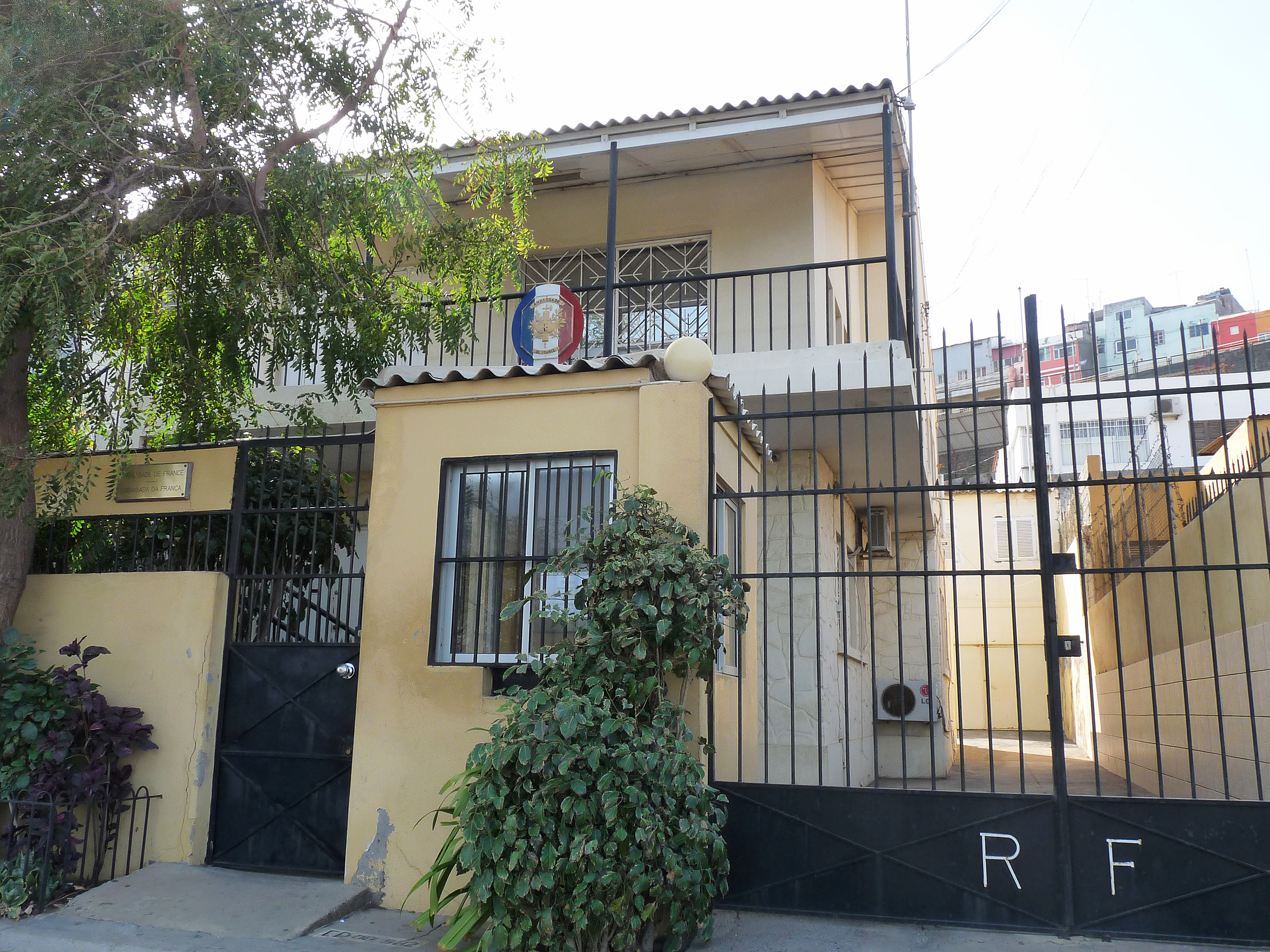
Embassy of France

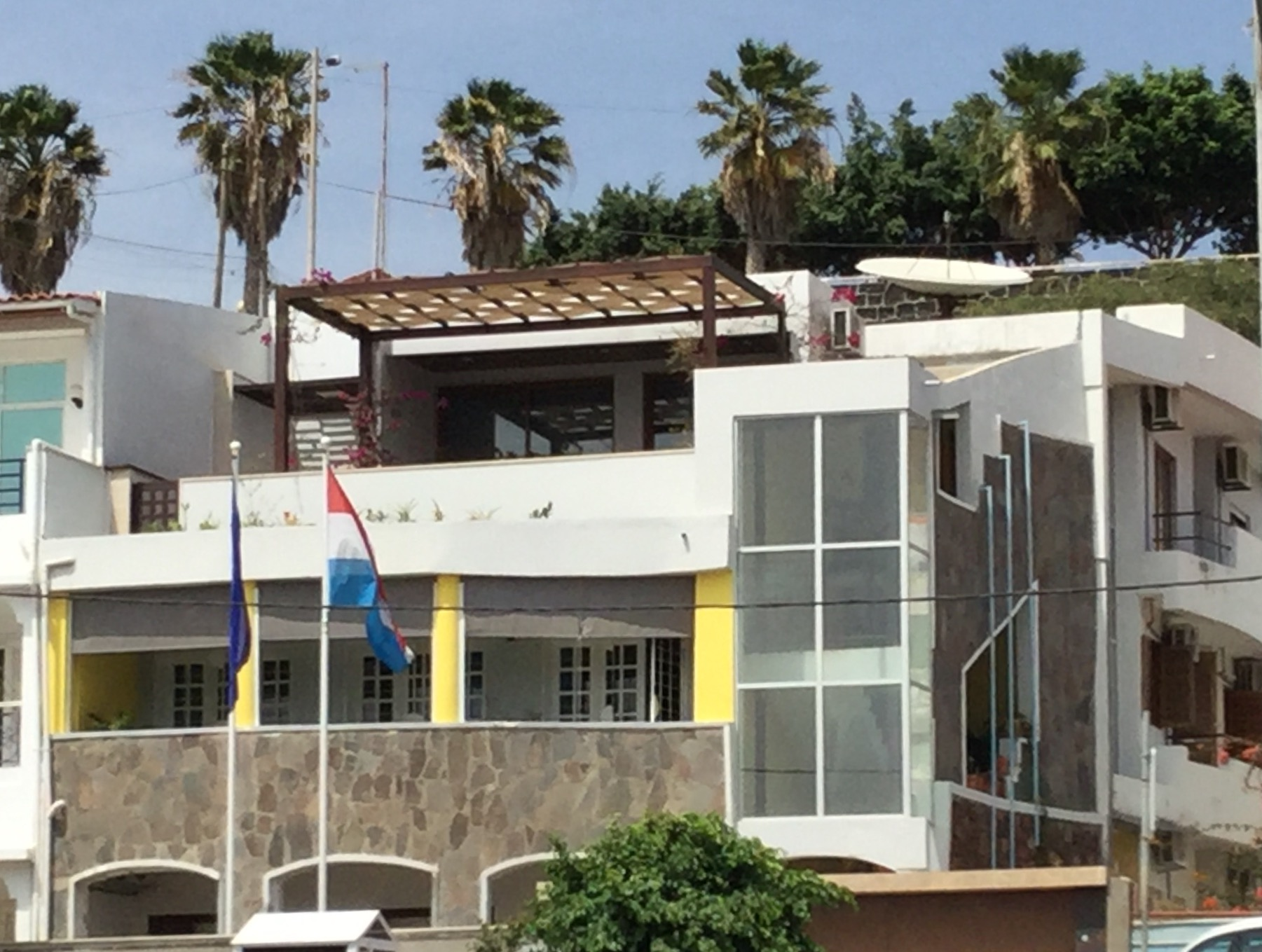
Embassy of Luxembourg

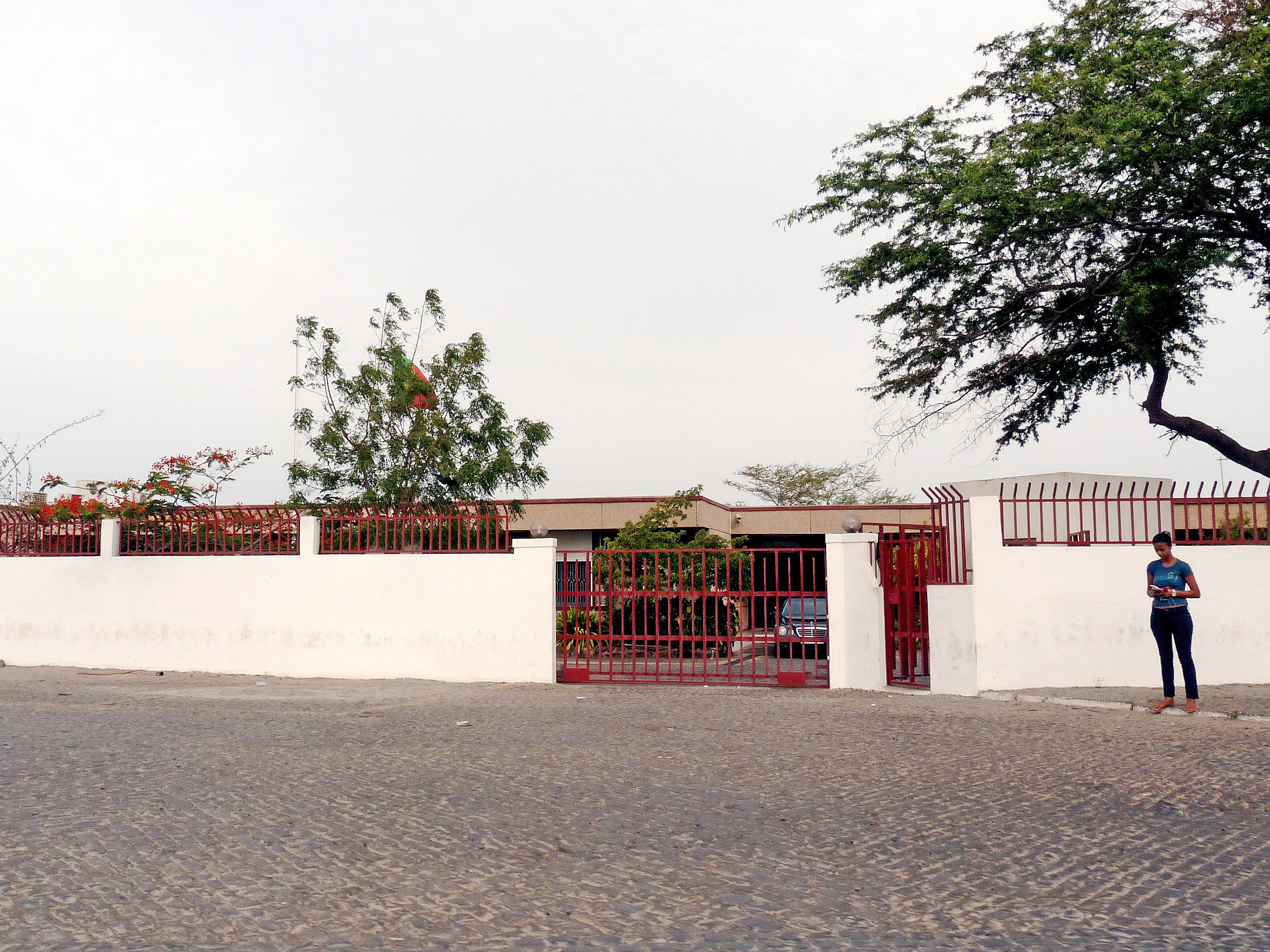
Embassy of Portugal

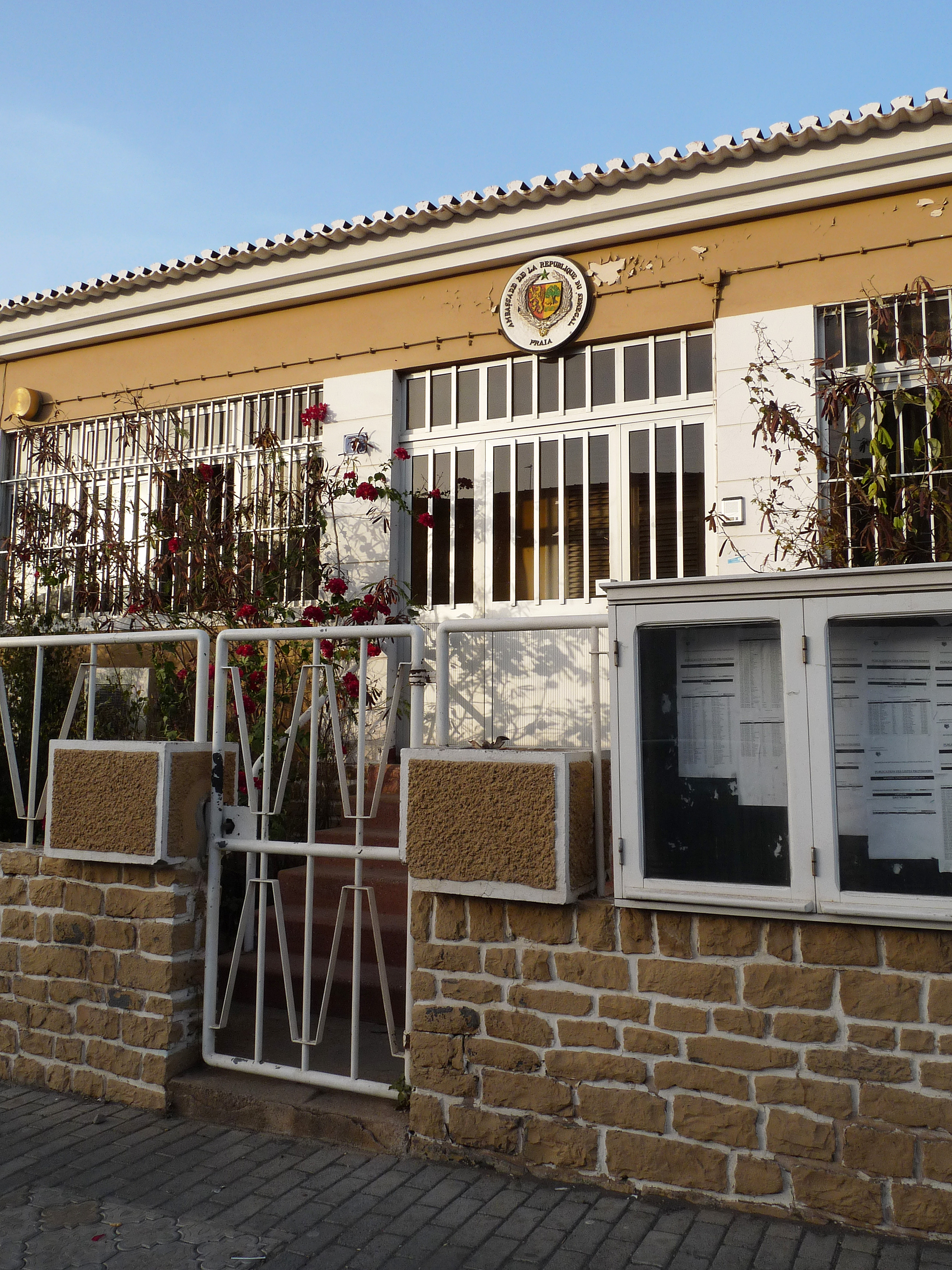
Embassy of Senegal

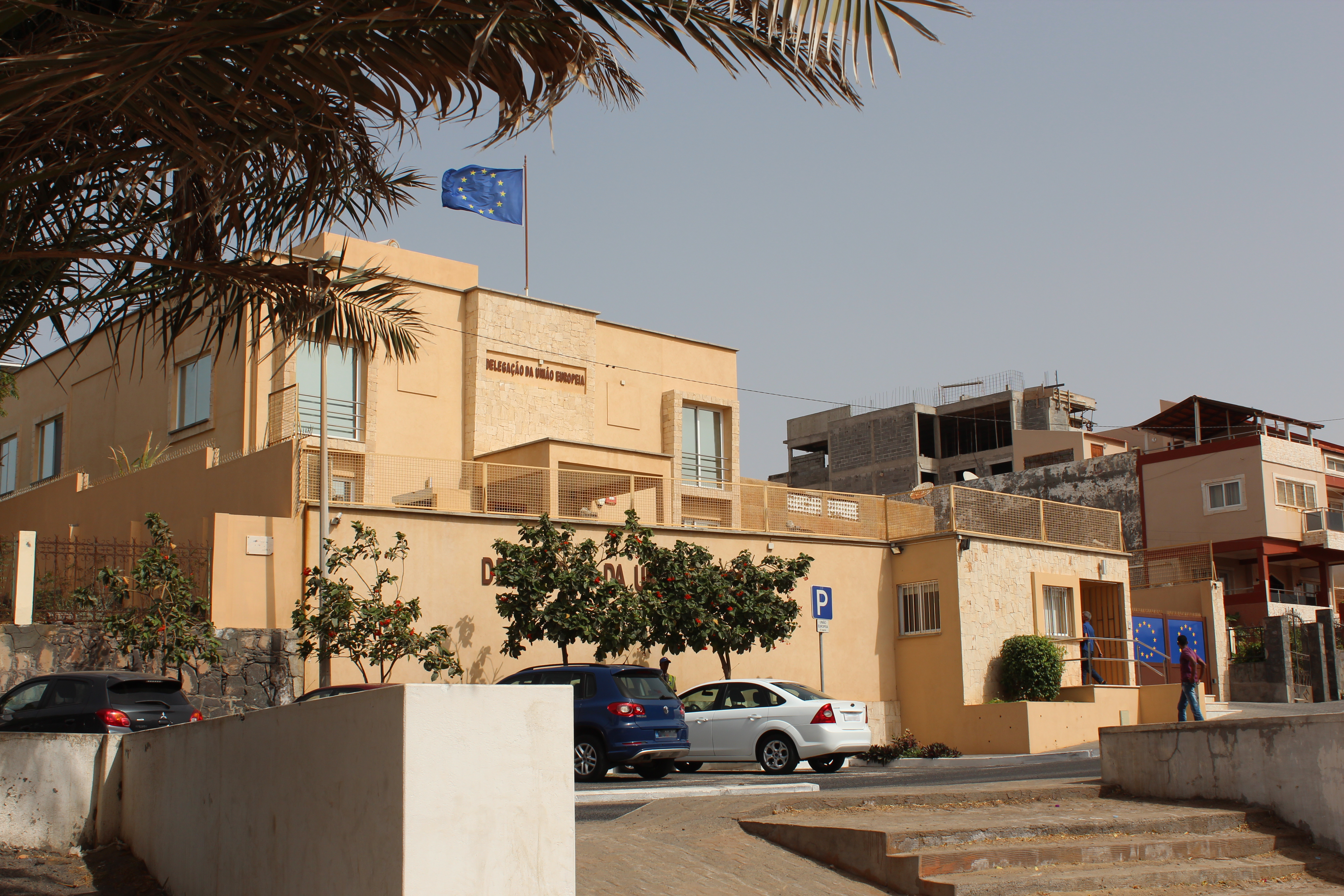
Delegation of the European Union

== Consular missions ==
=== Mindelo ===
- Portugal (Consular office)

== Non-resident embassies ==
Resident in Dakar

- Algeria
- Belgium
- Burkina Faso
- Colombia
- Cameroon
- Canada
- Egypt
- Ethiopia
- Gambia
- Germany
- Ghana
- Greece
- Guinea
- Holy See
- Indonesia
- Israel
- Italy
- Japan
- Kenya
- Malaysia
- Mali
- Netherlands
- Palestine
- Romania
- Saudi Arabia
- Sierra Leone
- South Africa
- South Korea
- Switzerland
- Thailand
- Turkey
- United Arab Emirates
- United Kingdom
- Venezuela
- Zimbabwe

Resident in Lisbon

- Argentina
- Australia
- Austria
- Croatia
- Cyprus
- Czech Republic
- Denmark
- Finland
- Iran
- Iraq
- Ireland
- Norway
- Panama
- Philippines
- Serbia
- Sovereign Military Order of Malta
- Sweden

Resident elsewhere

- Afghanistan (Paris)
- Jordan (Paris)
- Laos (Paris)
- Maldives (London)
- Mexico (New York City)
- Namibia (Luanda)
- Nigeria (Bissau)
- Seychelles (Addis Ababa)
- Slovakia (Abuja)
- Slovenia (Brussels)
- Vietnam (Luanda)
