= Outline of Cape Verde =

Island country in West Africa

The Flag of Cape Verde

The Coat of arms of Cape Verde

The location of Cape Verde

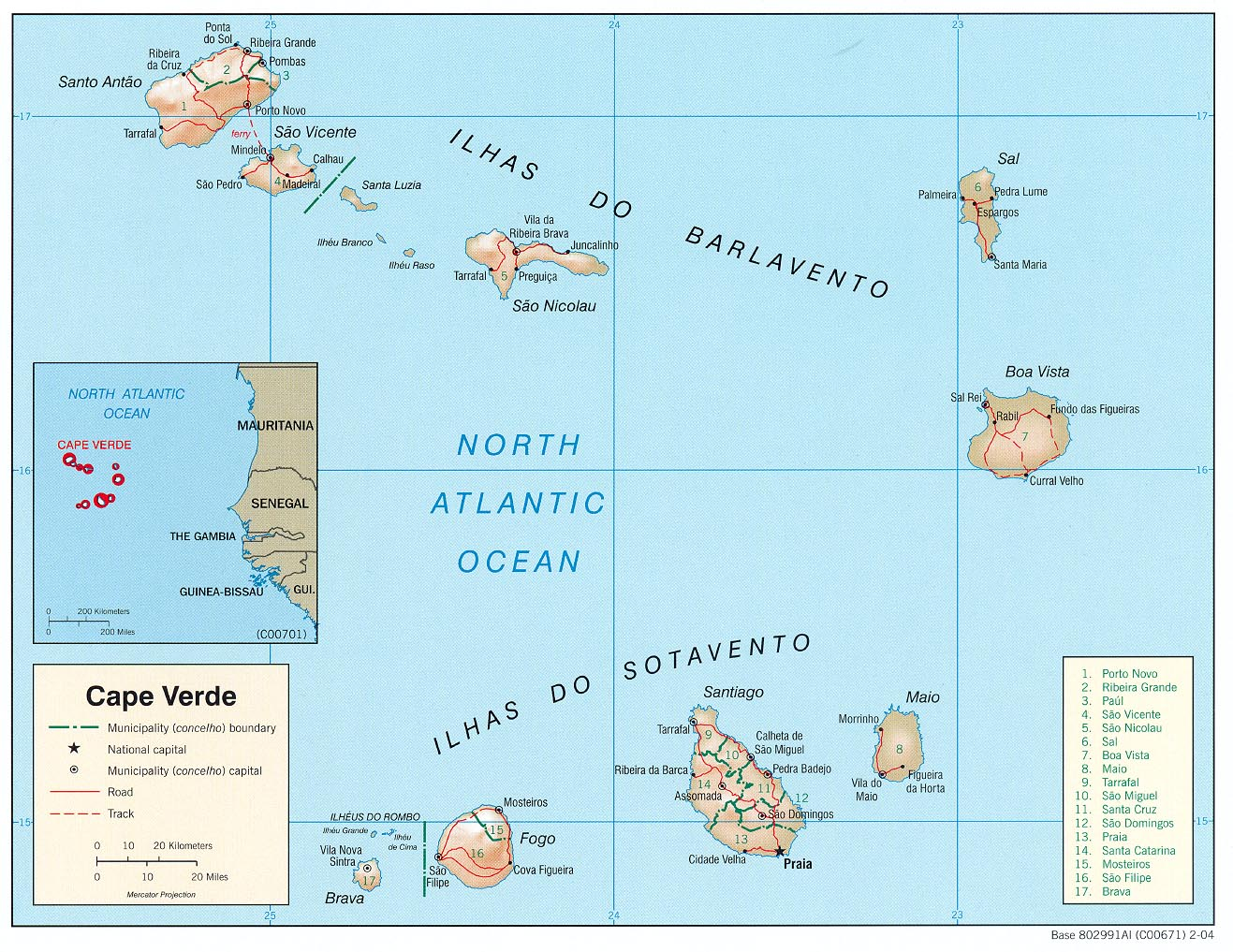
A relief map of the Republic of Cape Verde

The following outline is provided as an overview of and topical guide to Cape Verde:

Cape Verde – sovereign country located on an archipelago in the Macaronesia ecoregion of the North Atlantic Ocean, off the western coast of Africa. The previously uninhabited islands were discovered and colonized by the Portuguese in the 15th century (though there may have been earlier discoveries), and attained independence in 1975.

== General reference ==
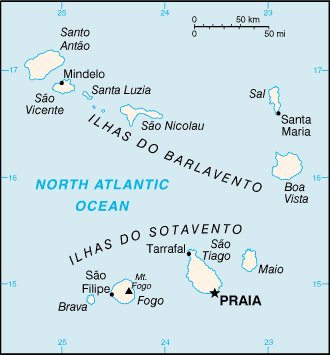
A basic map of Cape Verde

- Pronunciation: /ˌkeɪp ˈvɜːrd/
- Common English country name: Cape Verde
- Official English country name: The Republic of Cape Verde
- Common endonym(s):
- Official endonym(s):
- Adjectival(s): Cape Verdean
- Demonym(s): Cape Verdeans
- Etymology: Name of Cape Verde
- ISO country codes: CV, CPV, 132
- ISO region codes: See ISO 3166-2:CV
- Internet country code top-level domain: .cv

== Geography of Cape Verde ==
An enlargeable topographic map of Cape Verde

Geography of Cape Verde

- Cape Verde is:
  - an island country
    - of 10 islands and 8 islets
  - a Developing country
  - a Sovereign state
- Population of Cape Verde: 436,821(2008) - 165th most populous country
- Area of Cape Verde: 4,033 square kilometres (1,557 sq mi) - 172nd largest country
- Atlas of Cape Verde

=== Location ===
- Cape Verde is situated within:
  - Northern Hemisphere and Western Hemisphere
  - Atlantic Ocean
    - Macaronesia
  - Africa
    - West Africa
- Time zone: Cape Verde Time (UTC-01)
- Extreme points of Cape Verde
  - High: Mount Fogo 2,829 m (9,281 ft)
  - Low: North Atlantic Ocean 0 m
- Land boundaries: none
- Coastline: 965 km (600 mi)

=== Environment of Cape Verde ===
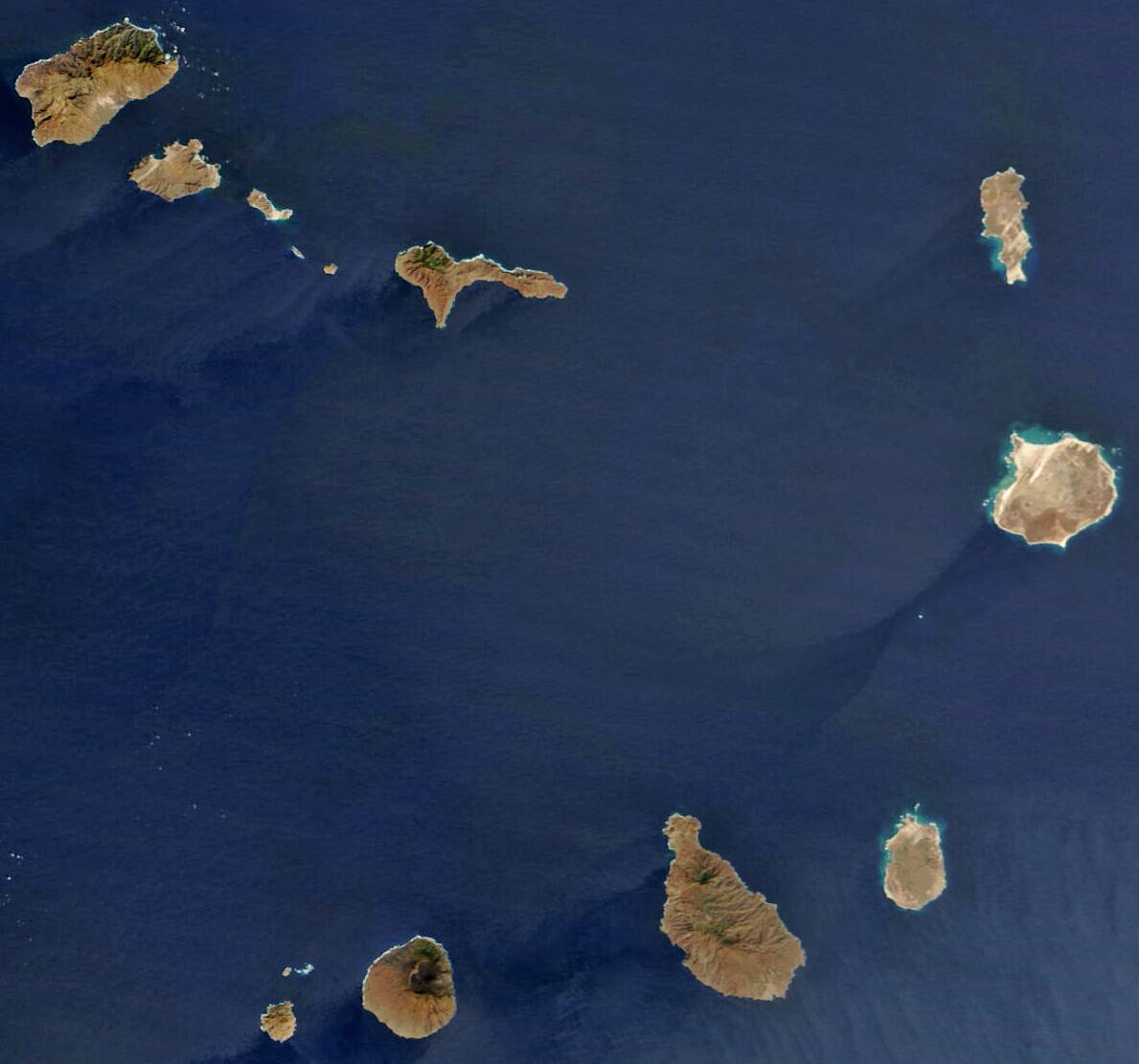
A satellite image of Cape Verde

- Climate of Cape Verde
  - Cape Verde-type hurricane
- Geology of Cape Verde
- Wildlife of Cape Verde
  - Fauna of Cape Verde
    - Birds of Cape Verde
    - Mammals of Cape Verde

==== Natural geographic features of Cape Verde ====
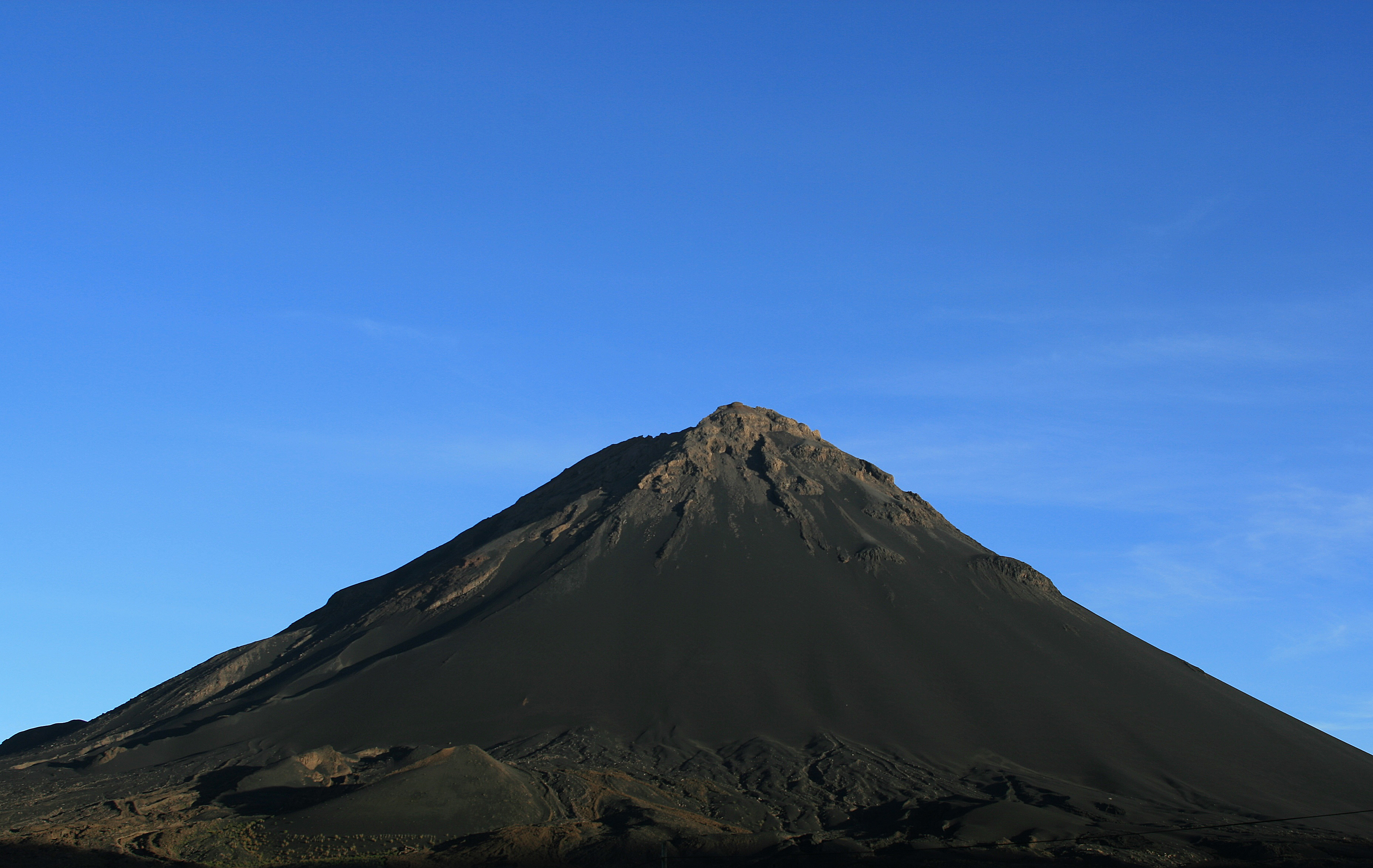
Mount Fogo

- Glaciers in Cape Verde: none
- Islands of Cape Verde
- Mountains of Cape Verde
  - Volcanoes in Cape Verde
- World Heritage Sites in Cape Verde: Cidade Velha

=== Regions of Cape Verde ===
Regions of Cape Verde

==== Administrative divisions of Cape Verde ====
Administrative divisions of Cape Verde

- Municipalities of Cape Verde

===== Municipalities of Cape Verde =====
Municipalities of Cape Verde

- Capital of Cape Verde: Praia
- Cities of Cape Verde

=== Demography of Cape Verde ===
Demographics of Cape Verde

== Government and politics of Cape Verde ==
Politics of Cape Verde

- Form of government: unitary semi-presidential representative democratic republic
- Capital of Cape Verde: Praia
- Elections in Cape Verde
- Political parties in Cape Verde

=== Branches of government ===
Government of Cape Verde

==== Executive branch of the government of Cape Verde ====
- Head of state: President of Cape Verde, José Maria Neves
- Head of government: Prime Minister of Cape Verde, Francisco Carvalho
- Cabinet of Cape Verde

==== Legislative branch of the government of Cape Verde ====
- Parliament of Cape Verde: National Assembly (unicameral)

=== Foreign relations of Cape Verde ===
Foreign relations of Cape Verde

- Diplomatic missions in Cape Verde
- Diplomatic missions of Cape Verde

==== International organization membership ====
Cape Verde is a member of:

- African Development Bank Group (AfDB)
- African Union (AU)
- African, Caribbean, and Pacific Group of States (ACP)
- Community of Democracies (CD)
- Community of Portuguese Language Countries (CPLP)
- Economic Community of West African States (ECOWAS)
- Food and Agriculture Organization (FAO)
- Group of 77 (G77)
- International Bank for Reconstruction and Development (IBRD)
- International Civil Aviation Organization (ICAO)
- International Criminal Court (ICCt)
- International Criminal Police Organization (Interpol)
- International Development Association (IDA)
- International Federation of Red Cross and Red Crescent Societies (IFRCS)
- International Finance Corporation (IFC)
- International Fund for Agricultural Development (IFAD)
- International Labour Organization (ILO)
- International Maritime Organization (IMO)
- International Monetary Fund (IMF)
- International Olympic Committee (IOC)
- International Organization for Migration (IOM)
- International Red Cross and Red Crescent Movement (ICRM)
- International Telecommunication Union (ITU)
- International Telecommunications Satellite Organization (ITSO)
- International Trade Union Confederation (ITUC)
- Inter-Parliamentary Union (IPU)
- Multilateral Investment Guarantee Agency (MIGA)
- Nonaligned Movement (NAM)
- Organisation internationale de la Francophonie (OIF)
- Organisation for the Prohibition of Chemical Weapons (OPCW)
- União Latina
- United Nations (UN)
- United Nations Conference on Trade and Development (UNCTAD)
- United Nations Educational, Scientific, and Cultural Organization (UNESCO)
- United Nations Industrial Development Organization (UNIDO)
- Universal Postal Union (UPU)
- World Customs Organization (WCO)
- World Federation of Trade Unions (WFTU)
- World Health Organization (WHO)
- World Intellectual Property Organization (WIPO)
- World Meteorological Organization (WMO)
- World Tourism Organization (UNWTO)
- World Trade Organization (WTO)

=== Law and order in Cape Verde ===
- Capital punishment in Cape Verde
- Crime in Cape Verde
- Human rights in Cape Verde
  - LGBT rights in Cape Verde
  - Freedom of religion in Cape Verde
- Law enforcement in Cape Verde

=== Military of Cape Verde ===
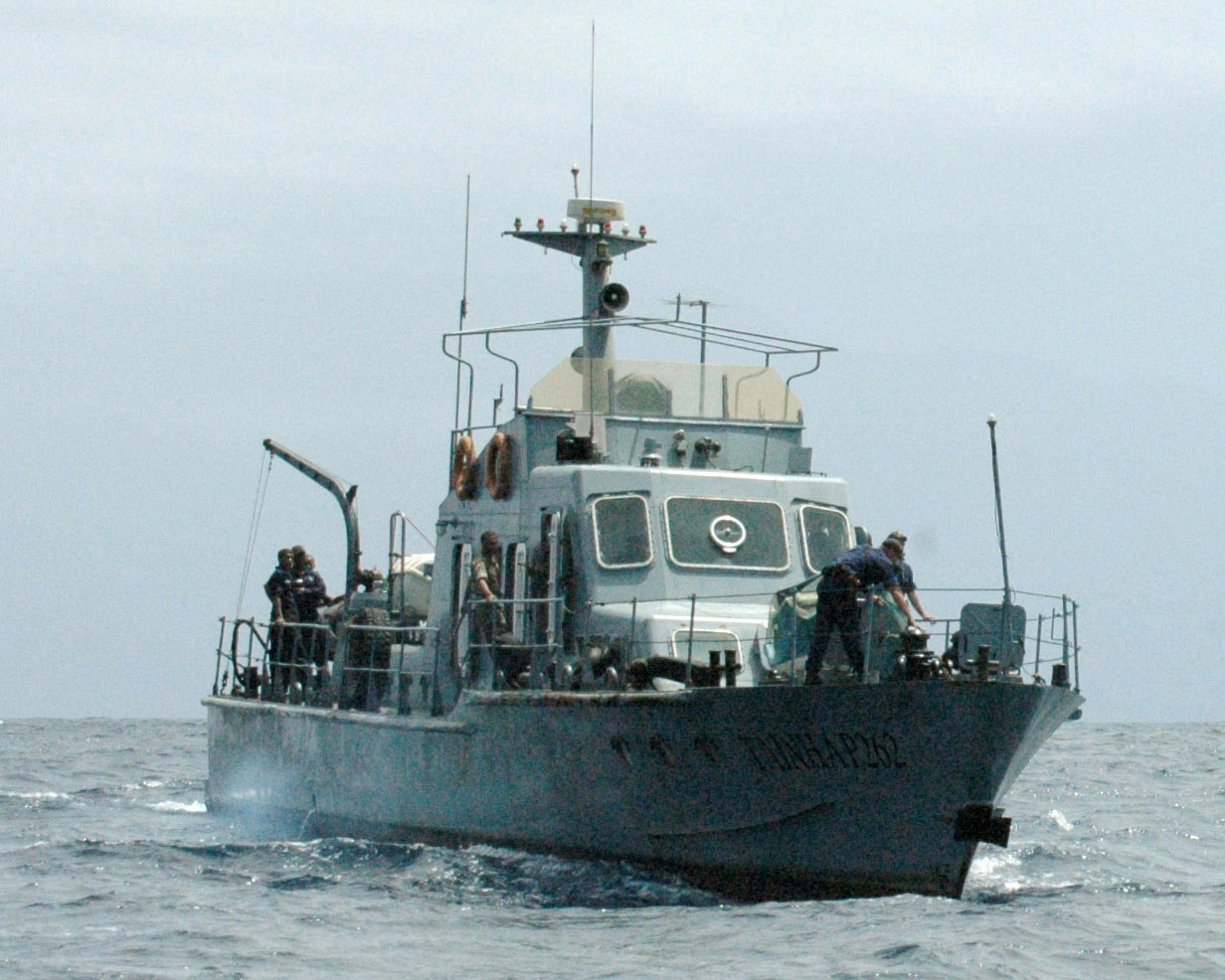
Cape Verdian coast guard ship Tainha (P 262)

Military of Cape Verde

- Command
  - Commander-in-chief of Cape Verde: the President of Cape Verde, Pedro Pires
- Forces
  - Army of Cape Verde
  - Navy of Cape Verde
- Military history of Cape Verde

== History of Cape Verde ==
History of Cape Verde

- Military history of Cape Verde

== Culture of Cape Verde ==
Culture of Cape Verde

- Architecture of Cape Verde
- Languages of Cape Verde
- National symbols of Cape Verde
  - Coat of arms of Cape Verde
  - Flag of Cape Verde
  - National anthem of Cape Verde
- People of Cape Verde
- Public holidays in Cape Verde
- Religion in Cape Verde
  - Buddhism in Cape Verde
  - Christianity in Cape Verde
    - Roman Catholicism in Cape Verde
  - Hinduism in Cape Verde
  - Islam in Cape Verde
- World Heritage Sites in Cape Verde: Cidade Velha

=== Art in Cape Verde ===
- Music of Cape Verde

=== Sports in Cape Verde ===
- Football in Cape Verde
- Cape Verde at the Olympics

== Economy and infrastructure of Cape Verde ==
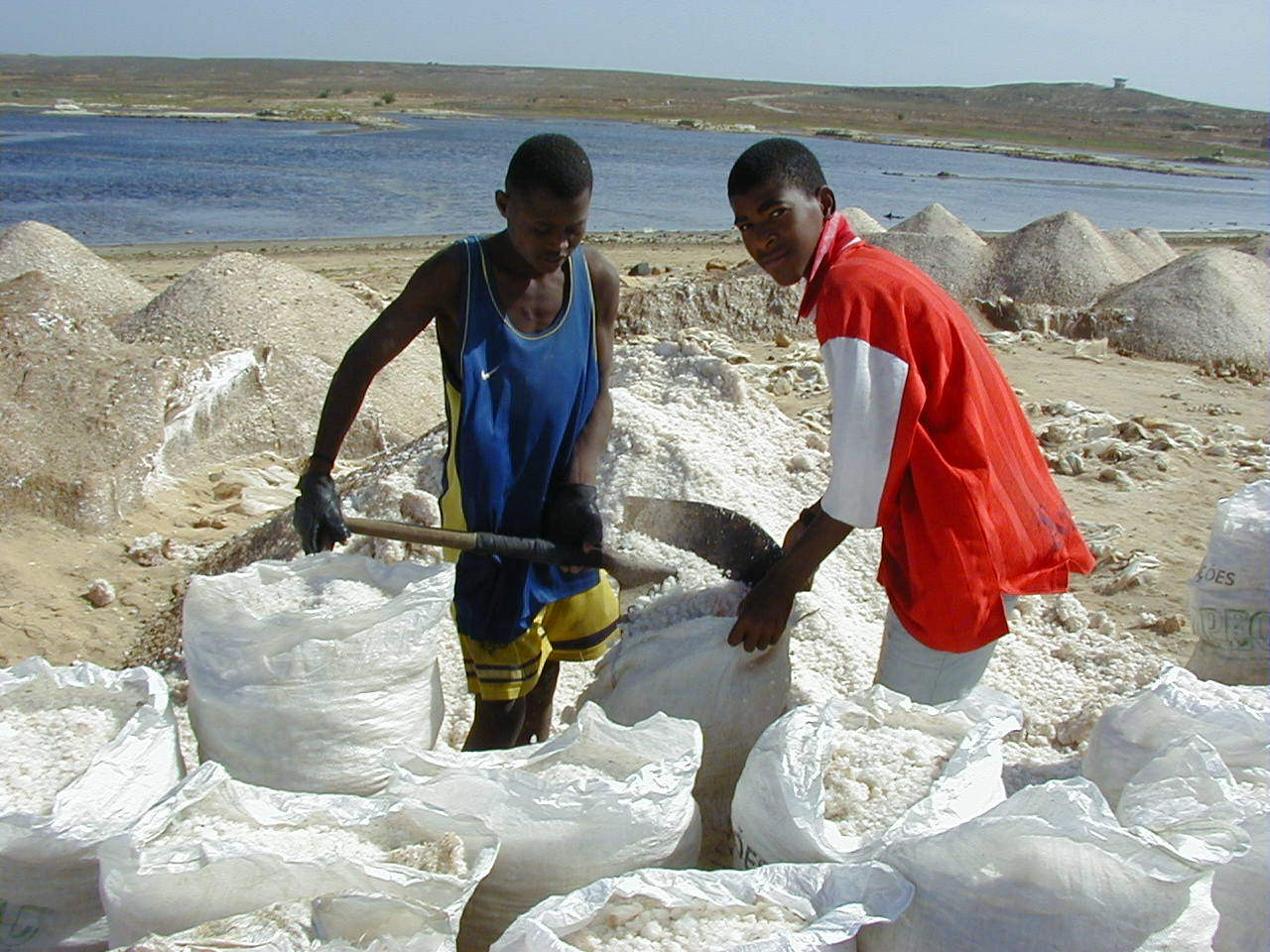
Locals collecting sea salt from the salt flats on the island of Maio

Economy of Cape Verde

- Economic rank, by nominal GDP (2007): 160th (one hundred and sixtieth)
- Agriculture in Cape Verde
- Communications in Cape Verde
  - Internet in Cape Verde
- Companies of Cape Verde
- Currency of Cape Verde: Escudo
  - ISO 4217: CVE
- Energy in Cape Verde
- Health care in Cape Verde
- Mining in Cape Verde
- Tourism in Cape Verde
  - Visa policy of Cape Verde
- Transport in Cape Verde
  - Airports in Cape Verde
  - Roads in Cape Verde

== Education in Cape Verde ==
Education in Cape Verde

== Health in Cape Verde ==
Health in Cape Verde

== See also ==
Cape Verde

- List of Cape Verde-related topics
- List of international rankings
- Member state of the United Nations
- Outline of Africa
