= Socialist Cape Verde =

Former government of Cape Verde

Republic of Cape Verde República de Cabo Verde
- 1975-1990
- Flag Coat of Arms
- Motto: Unidade, Trabalho, Progresso "Unity, Work, Progress"
- Anthem: Esta É a Nossa Pátria Amada "This Is Our Beloved Homeland" (1975-1990)
- Map of Cape Verde
- Official languages: Portuguese
- Religion: Secular state (de jure)

Population
  - 1980 census: ▲323,300
- ISO 3166 code: CV

Cape Verde was a socialist state ruled by the PAIGC from its independence from Portugal in 1975, to its first elections in 1990. It was a one party authoritarian state, which aimed at union with Guinea-Bissau, but that plan ultimately failed.

== Formation ==
After the 25 April 1974 Carnation Revolution, Cape Verde became more autonomous but continued to have an overseas governor until that post became a high commissioner. Widespread unrest forced the government to negotiate with the PAIGC, and agreements for an independent Cape Verde were on the table. Pedro Pires (at the time still in Algeria) signed an agreement at the end of August that year to give Portuguese Guinea and Cape Verde both paths to independence, with the islands planned to hold a referendum on such in the near future. However, such referendum never ended up being scheduled, with the PAIGC renouncing the agreement by the next February as they established their government on the islands, asking for immediate independence without a referendum instead. On 5 July in Praia, Portuguese Prime Minister Vasco Gonçalves transferred power to National Assembly President Abilio Duarte. The colonial history of Cape Verde ended when Cape Verde become independent, a negotiated transfer, and one of the few Portuguese African colonies to achieve independence without guerilla fighting within its borders.

== Growth ==
Cape Verde built the foundations for a stable, constitutional democratic state. From early on, Cape Verde's practical approach to development policy was evident. Even during this interventionist period, leaders emphasized prudent fiscal management, low inflation, and stable monetary and exchange rate policies. According to World Bank, the 1982-1990 GDP growth was around 5.2%, With growth mainly in the first half of the decade.
