= Economy of Cape Verde =

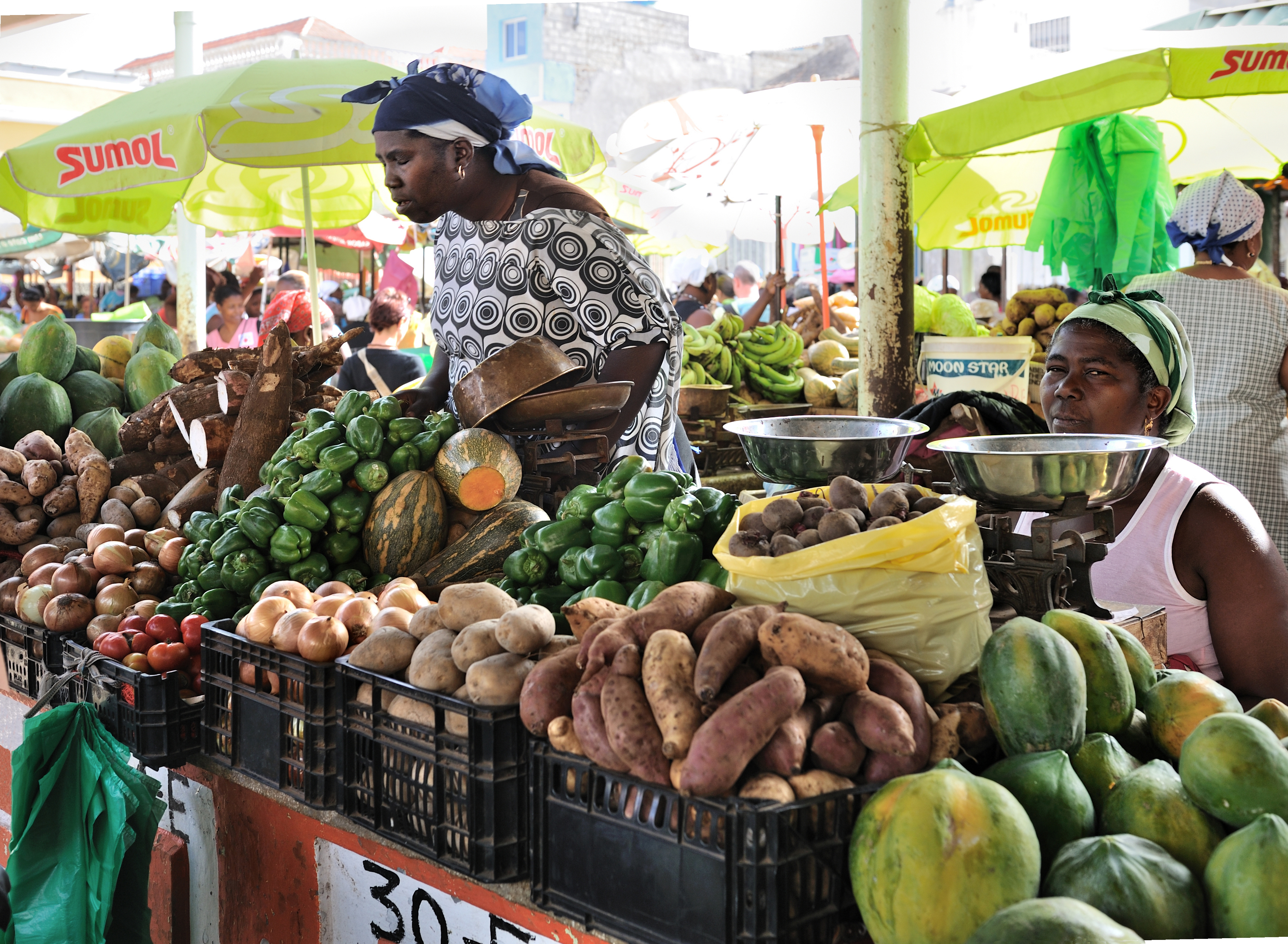
- A market place in Praia
- Currency: Cape Verdean escudo (CVE)
- Fiscal year: Calendar year
- Trade organisations: AU, WTO
- Country group: Developing/Emerging; Upper-middle income economy

Statistics
- GDP: ▲$2.79 billion (nominal; 2025); ▲$6.3 billion (PPP; 2025)
- GDP rank: 168th (nominal; 2025); 175th (PPP; 2025)
- GDP growth: 5.0% (2025); 4.9% (2026f)
- GDP per capita: ▲$5,420 (nominal; 2025); ▲$12,250 (PPP; 2025)
- GDP per capita rank: 114th (nominal; 2025); 118th (PPP; 2025)
- GDP per capita growth: 5.8% (2025)
- GDP by sector: agriculture (4.7%); industrial (10.5%); services (69.4%) (2024 estimate)* (2024 est.)}}
- Inflation (CPI): 1.275% (2018)
- Population below national poverty line: 15% (As of 2010)
- Labour force: 243,120 (2010)
- Labour force by occupation: food and beverages, fish processing, shoes and garments, salt mining, ship repair
- Unemployment: ▲11.9% (2025)
- Youth unemployment: ▲28.4% (2025)
- Informal employment: 60.6% (2015)

External
- Exports: $1 billion (2019 est.)
- Export goods: processed and frozen fish, mollusks, clothing, scrap iron (2019)
- Main export partners: Spain 65%; Portugal 14%; Italy 8%; (2016)
- Imports: $1.29 billion (2019 est.)
- Import goods: refined petroleum, delivery trucks, coal tar oil, cars, rice (2019)
- Main import partners: Portugal 39%; Netherlands 16%; Spain 11%; China 6%; (2016)
- Gross external debt: $284 million (As of 2010)

Public finance
- Government debt: N/A (As of 2008)
- Revenue: $480 million (2009 est.)
- Spending: $595.9 million (2009 est.)
- Economic aid: $136 million (recipient) (As of 2009)
- Credit rating: Standard & Poor's: B+ (Domestic); B+ (Foreign); BB (T&C Assessment)
- All values, unless otherwise stated, are in US dollars.

Cape Verde has a developing economy that is service-oriented with a focus on commerce, trade, transport and public services. It is a small archipelagic nation that lacks resources and has experienced severe droughts. Agriculture is made difficult by lack of rain and is restricted to only four islands for most of the year. Cape Verde's economy has been steadily growing since the late 1990s, and it is now officially considered a country of average development, being only the second African country to have achieved such transition, after Botswana in 1994. Cape Verde has significant cooperation with Portugal at every level of the economy, which has led it to link its currency (the Cape Verdean escudo) first to the Portuguese escudo and, in 1999, to the euro.

== Overview ==
About 75% of food is imported. Cape Verde annually runs a high trade deficit, financed by foreign aid and remittances from emigrants; remittances constitute a supplement to GDP of more than 20%. Economic reforms, launched by the new democratic government in 1991, are aimed at developing the private sector and attracting foreign investment to diversify the economy. Since 1991, the policies the government has pursued include an open welcome to foreign investors and a far-reaching privatization program.

Fish and shellfish are plentiful, and small quantities are exported. Cape Verde has cold storage and freezing facilities as well as fish processing plants in Mindelo, Praia, and on Sal. However, the fishing potential, mostly lobster and tuna, is not fully exploited.

The economy is service-oriented, with commerce, transport, and public services accounting for almost 70% of the GDP. Although nearly 35% of the population lives in rural areas, the share of agriculture in GDP in 2010 was only 9.2% (up from 8.9% in 1995); of the 1998 total, fishing accounts for 1.5%.

The Cape Verdean government established the top priorities for development as the promotion of a market economy and of the private sector; the development of tourism, light manufacturing industries, and fisheries; and the development of transport, communications, and energy facilities. In 1994-95 Cape Verde received a total of about U.S.$50 million in foreign investments, of which 50% was in industry, 19% in tourism, and 31% in fisheries and services. Prospects for 2000 depend heavily on the maintenance of aid flows, remittances, and the momentum of the government's development program.

== International recognition ==
Cape Verde is considered a developing country, and is included on the list of the United Nations Small Island Developing States.

In 2007 the United Nations graduated Cape Verde from the category of Least Developed Countries, only the second time this has happened to a country.

On December 18, 2007, the General Council of the World Trade Organization approved a package for the accession of Cape Verde to the WTO. Accession was effective on July 23, 2008, 30 days after ratification by Cape Verde, which took place on 23 June. The package requires Cape Verde to adapt some of its economic regulation. In particular, it will need to introduce a new Customs Code, and to introduce copyright and patent laws complying with the Agreement on Trade-Related Aspects of Intellectual Property Rights. According to the World Intellectual Property Organization (WIPO), Cape Verde have a law on copyrights (Law No. 101/III/90, December 1990) and an Industrial Property Code (Legislative Decree No. 4/2007 of August 20, 2007). Pascal Lamy, director-general of the WTO said, "I am very pleased to welcome Cape Verde as a new member. This new membership will strengthen multilateral trading system. Being part of the WTO will enable Cape Verde to continue its integration into the world economy."

== Sectors ==
=== Mineral industry ===
Mining is an insignificant contributor to the country's economy. Most of the country's mineral requirements are imported. As of 2007, production of mineral commodities was limited to clay on the islands of Boa Vista, Sal, and São Vicente; gypsum and iron ore on the island of Maio; limestone on the islands of Boa Vista, Sal, and Santo Antão; pozzolana on the island of Santo Antão; and salt on the islands of Maio and Sal. Cape Verde was not a natural gas or petroleum producer as of 2007.

=== Tourism ===
Tourism in Cape Verde, a group of islands off the coast of Senegal, West Africa, started in the 1970s on the island of Sal and increased slowly in the 1980s and 1990s.

== Infrastructure ==
=== Transportation ===
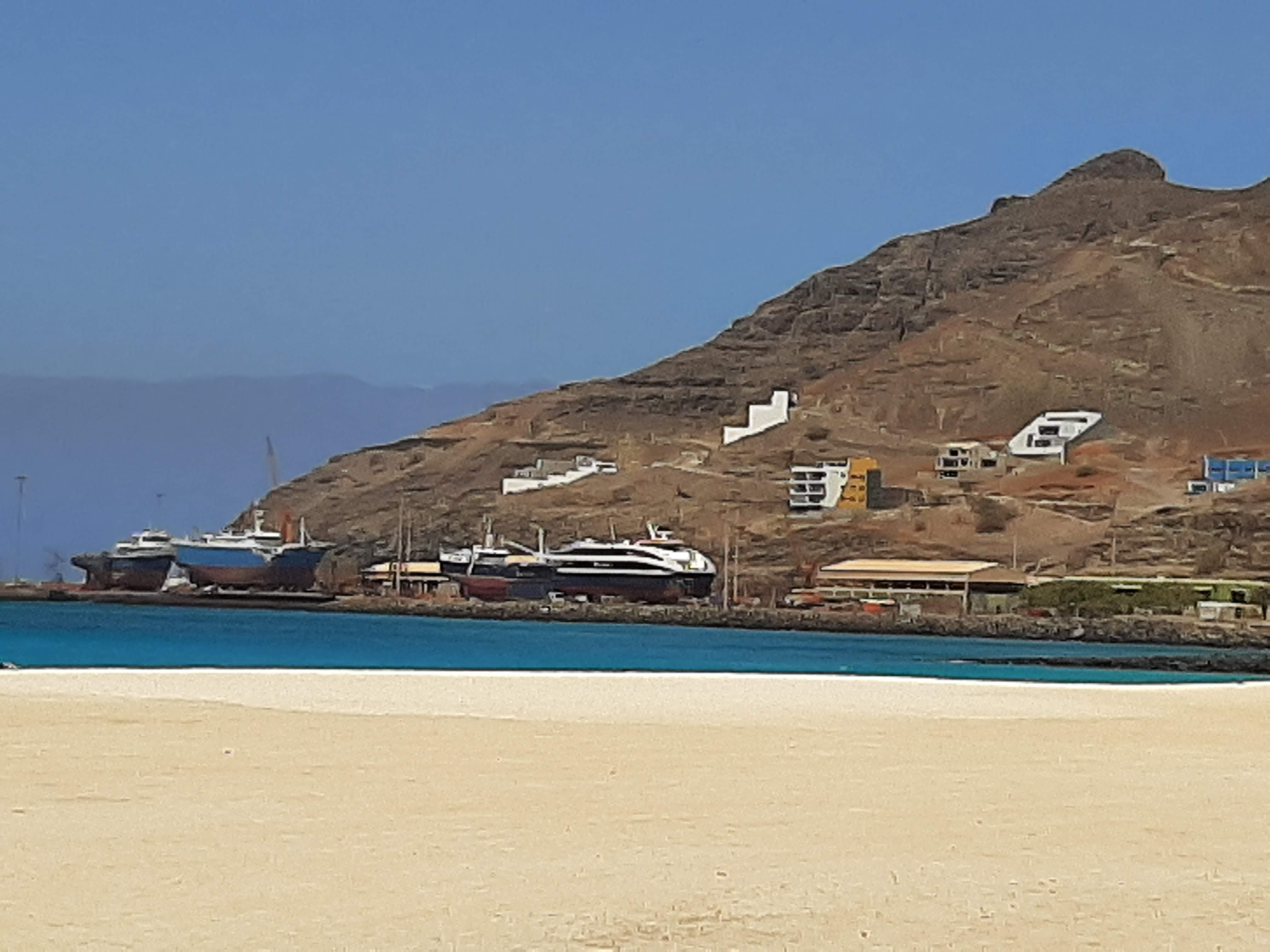
Shipyard at Mindelo

Cape Verde's strategic location at the crossroads of mid-Atlantic air and sea lanes has been enhanced by significant improvements at Mindelo's harbour (Porto Grande) and at Sal's international airport. Ship repair facilities at Mindelo were opened in 1983, and the harbours at Mindelo and Praia were recently renovated. The major ports are Mindelo and Praia, but all other islands have small port facilities, some of which are to be expanded in the near future. In addition to the international airport on Sal, airports are located on all of the inhabited islands except for the smallest island, Brava, which was built, but found to be too dangerous so it was shut down after a few failed attempted landings. The archipelago has 3,050 kilometers (1,830 mi.) of roads, of which 1,010 kilometers (606 mi.) are paved. The new Praia International Airport is currently operative.

=== Energy ===
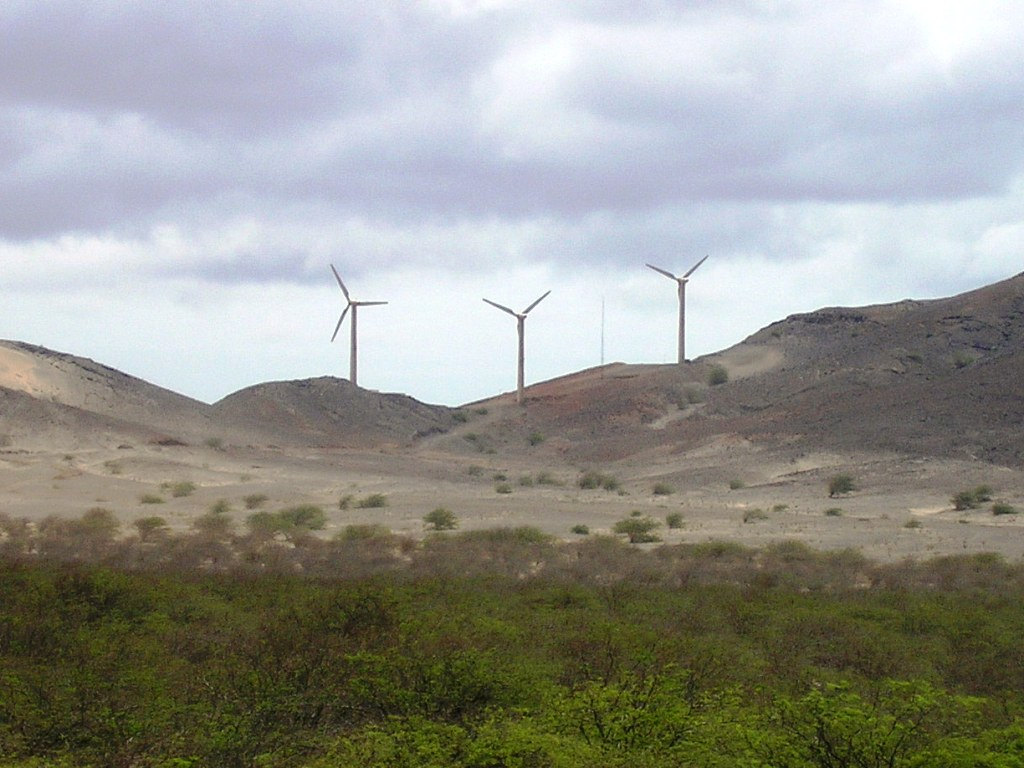
Wind farm on São Vicente island, Cape Verde

Cape Verde is a net importer of energy, with no significant fossil energy resources. As of 2016, 176,743 tonnes of fuel (about 3,550 barrels per day) were sold on the internal market. Electricity production was 443 GWh in 2016, of which 81% from thermal power, 17% from wind power and 1.4% from solar power. The main electricity producing company of Cape Verde is Electra. Electra serves all islands of Cape Verde except Boa Vista, where electricity and water are produced and distributed by the public-private company Águas e Energia de Boavista. Other smaller electricity producers are Cabeólica, which operates four wind parks, Águas de Ponta Preta on the island of Sal, and Electric Wind on Santo Antão.

=== Telecommunications ===
Telecommunications in Cape Verde include fixed-line and mobile telephone services, radio and television broadcasting, and Internet access. The country's telecommunications system underwent extensive modernization from 1996 to 2000 following partial privatization in 1995. Cellular service was introduced in 1998, a fiber-optic ring linking all islands was completed in 2001, and broadband services were launched in 2004. Cape Verde is a landing point for the Atlantis-2 transatlantic fiber-optic cable.

== Macroeconomic statistics ==
Exports of Cape Verde by product category (2019) Chemical products Transportation Machines Mineral products Plastics and rubbers Metals Foodstuffs Precious metals Textiles Instruments Animal products Vegetable products Paper goods Footwear and headwear Miscellaneous Stone and glass Wood products Animal and vegetable bi-products Animal hides Arts and antiques Weapons

=== Main indicators ===
The following table shows the main economic indicators in 1980-2026. Inflation below 5% is in green.

Year	GDP			GDP growth (real)	Inflation	Government debt (% of GDP)
Year	Total (bil. US$ PPP)	Per capita (US$ PPP)	Total (bil. US$ nominal)	GDP growth (real)	Inflation	Government debt (% of GDP)
1980	0.2	861	0.2	▲5.3	▲15.1	n/a
1985	▲0.4	▲1390	0.2	▲8.6	▲5.9	n/a
1990	▲0.6	▲1764	▲0.4	▲0.7	▲11.1	n/a
1995	▲0.9	▲2336	▲0.6	▲7.5	▲8.4	n/a
2000	▲1.4	▲3391	▲0.7	▲7.3	▲ -2.4	▲71.9
2005	▲2.1	▲4651	▲1.4	▲5.8	▲0.4	▼66.7
2006	▲2.4	▲5164	▲1.5	▲9.1	▲4.8	▼66.2
2007	▲2.8	▲6039	▲1.7	▲15.2	▲4.4	▼59.6
2008	▲3.0	▲6518	▲2.0	▲7.0	▲6.8	▼57.5
2009	3.0	▼6392	▼1.9	▼ -1.5	▲1.0	▲58.8
2010	▲3.1	▲6517	▼1.8	▲1.8	▲2.1	▲66.2
2011	▲3.3	▲6873	▲2.0	▲3.9	▲4.5	▲71.6
2012	▲3.4	▲7038	▼1.9	▲1.1	▲2.5	▲82.9
2013	▲3.5	▲7162	▲2.0	▲0.6	▲1.5	▲93.5
2014	▲3.6	▲7297	2.0	▲0.7	▲ -0.2	▲105.7
2015	3.6	▲7393	▼1.8	▲0.9	▲0.1	▲115.7
2016	▲3.8	▲7750	▲1.9	▲4.3	▲ -1.4	▼115.6
2017	▲4.1	▲8214	▲2.0	▲4.6	▲0.8	▼113
2018	4.1	▼8169	▲2.2	▲3.7	▲1.3	▼112.3
2019	▲4.4	▲8890	▲2.3	▲6.9	▲1.1	▼109.8
2020	▼3.5	▼7048	▼1.8	▼ -20.8	▲0.6	▲149.1
2021	▲4.0	▲7876	▲2.1	▲7.0	▲1.9	▲149.5
2022	▲4.9	▲9726	▲2.3	▲15.8	▲7.9	▼127.6
2023	▲5.4	▲10517	▲2.5	▲4.8	▲3.7	▼117.5
2024	▲5.9	▲11504	▲2.7	▲7.2	▲1.1	▼112.8
2025	▲6.4	▲12423	▲3.1	▲5.5	▲2.3	▼101
2026	▲6.9	▲13314	▲3.4	▲4.8	▲2.2	▼95.9

== See also ==
- Cape Verdean escudo
- United Nations Economic Commission for Africa
