= Cape Verdean =

Cape Verdean may refer to:

- Something of, from, or related to the country of Cape Verde
- A person from Cape Verde, or of Cape Verdean descent:
  - Cape Verdeans
  - Cape Verdean Americans
  - Demographics of Cape Verde
  - List of Cape Verdeans
- Cape Verdean Creole, a language
- Cape Verdean cuisine
