= Religion in Cape Verde =

Religion in Cape Verde (Pew 2020)
Religion	percent
Christianity	78.3%
Islam	1%
Unaffiliated	20.6%
Other religion	1%

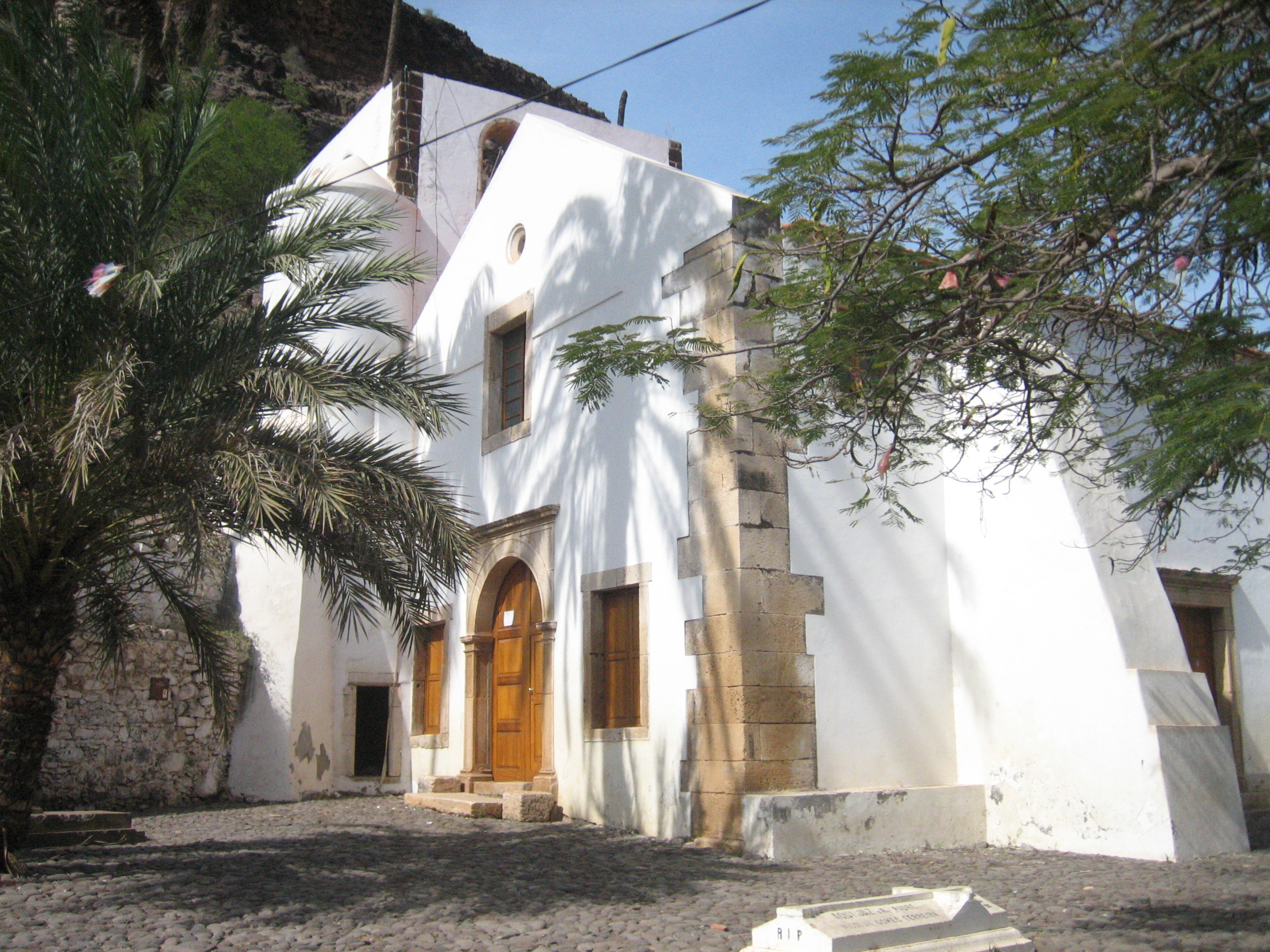
A Catholic church in Santiago, Cape Verde.

Christianity is the largest religion in Cape Verde, with Catholicism having the most adherents. Different sources give varying estimates on the relative sizes of various Christian denominations. According to projections from the Association of Religion Data Archives, more than 94% of the population of Cape Verde is Christian, with almost 85% being Catholic. About 5% of the population is Protestant. The largest Protestant denomination is the Church of the Nazarene. Other groups include the Assemblies of God, Seventh-day Adventist Church, the Universal Church of the Kingdom of God, independent Baptists and various other Pentecostal and evangelical groups. There is also a small presence of the Islamic and Baháʼí Faith communities.

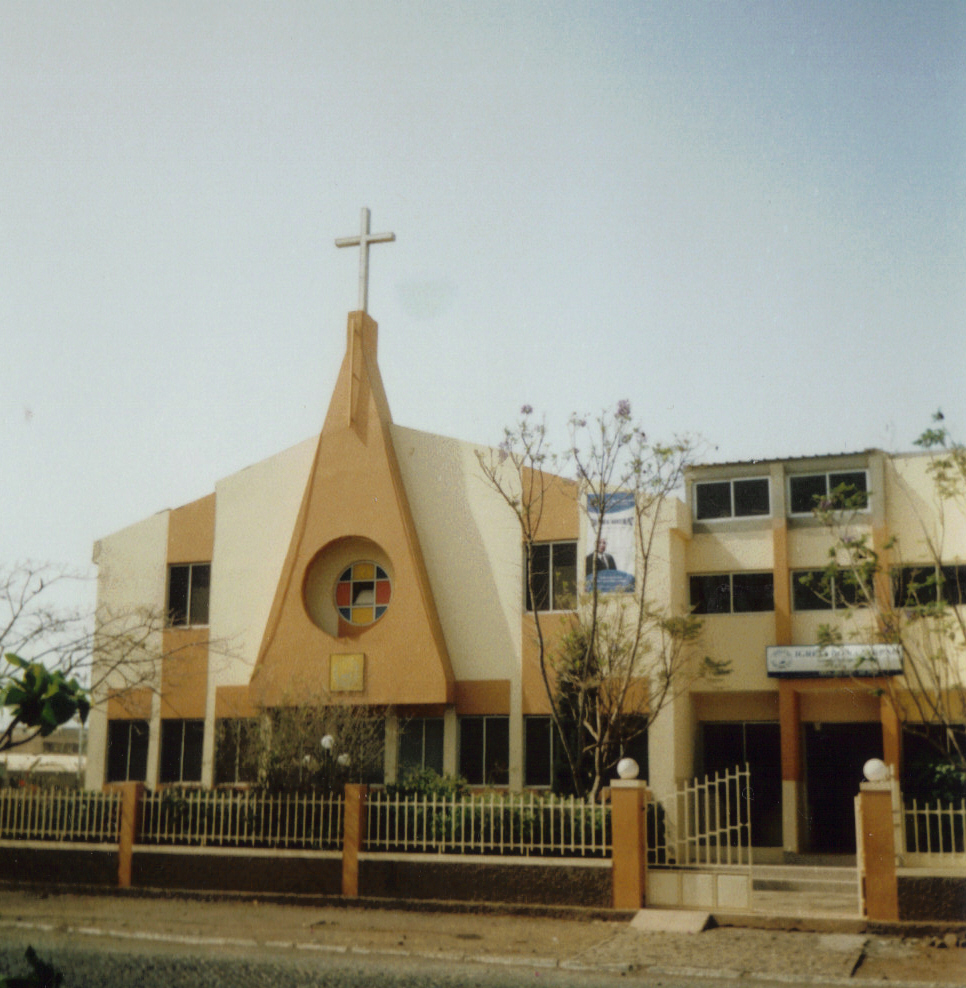
Protestant Church in Praia.

The Constitution provides for freedom of religion, and the Government generally respects this right in practice.

The national census in 2021 showed 73% Catholics, 2% Seventh Day Adventists, 2% Nazarene, 2% Christian Rationalist, 1% Muslim, and 16% who were not identifying with any religion.

In 2026, the country was scored 4 out of 4 for religious freedom.

== See also ==
- Outline of Cape Verde
- Islands of Macaronesia
  - Azores
  - Canary Islands
  - Madeira
- Christianity in Cape Verde
- Roman Catholicism in Cape Verde
- Islam in Cape Verde
- Freedom of religion in Cape Verde
- The Church of Jesus Christ of Latter-day Saints in Cape Verde
