= Regions of Cape Verde =

Cape Verde also referred to in English by its Portuguese name Cabo Verde, and known officially as the Republic of Cabo Verde,[b] is an archipelagic country in the eastern Atlantic Ocean, off the coast of West Africa that is historically divided into two groups, or regions:

- Barlavento (meaning literally Windward), including Santo Antão, São Vicente, Santa Luzia, São Nicolau, Sal and Boa Vista, in the northern side.
- Sotavento (meaning literally Leeward), including Maio, Santiago, Fogo and Brava, in the southern side.

In addition to the historical regions, the islands can also be divided by geographical features, resulting in:

- A group of dry, very flat, and geologically old islands (Sal, Boa Vista and Maio), lying to the east and closer to the African coast (which makes them a target for sand from the Sahara desert, resulting in long sandy beaches, typically used for beach tourism), and
- A group of rocky, volcanic, agricultural islands more to the west. Their orography is rougher because they're geologically newer, and the westernmost islands (such as Santo Antão) tend to be the most mountainous.
