= Christianity in Cape Verde =

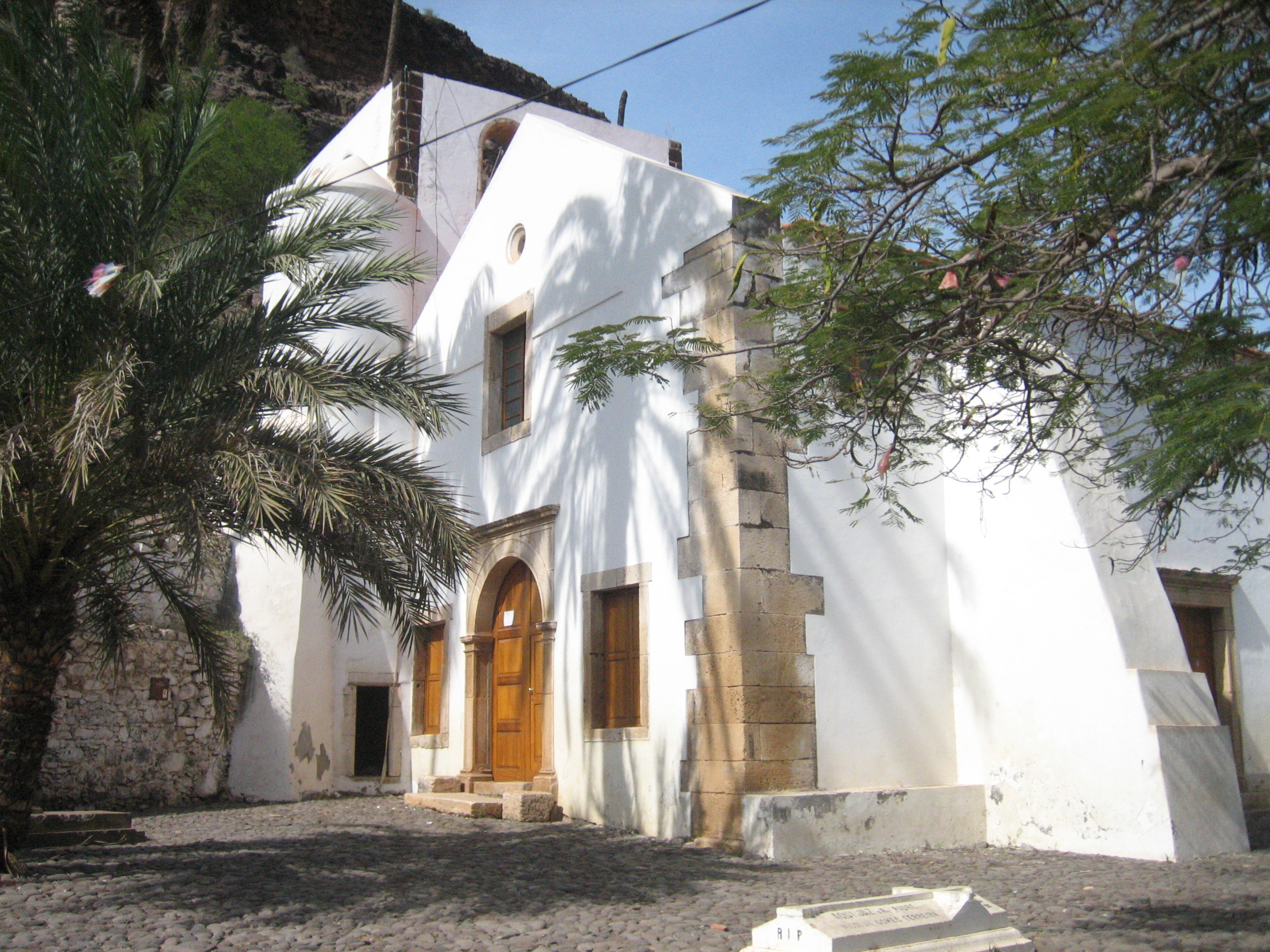
Church in Santiago, Cape Verde

Christianity is the largest religion in Cape Verde, with Roman Catholics having the most adherents. Different sources give varying estimates on the relative sizes of various Christian denominations. More than 94% of the population of Cape Verde is Christian, with almost 85% being Roman Catholic. About 5% of the population is Protestant. The largest Protestant denomination is the Church of the Nazarene. Other groups include the Church of the Nazarene, the Assemblies of God, Seventh-day Adventist Church, the Universal Church of the Kingdom of God, independent Baptists and various other Pentecostal and evangelical groups.

== See also ==
- Religion in Cape Verde
- Roman Catholicism in Cape Verde
- Freedom of religion in Cape Verde
- The Church of Jesus Christ of Latter-day Saints in Cape Verde
