= São Vicente Island =

São Vicente Island may refer to:

- São Vicente, Cape Verde
- São Vicente Island (São Paulo, Brazil)
