= Human rights in Cape Verde =

Human rights in Cape Verde are addressed under the national constitution.

The 2021 Human Rights Report by the United States Department of State noted that in general, the government respected the basic rights of citizens; however, there were concerns in certain areas such treatment by military personnel against other military personnel.

== Development ==
Legislative protection of human rights can be seen as a relatively recent development, with the constitution being officially adopted in 1980. The political system operates under a multi-party parliamentary democracy.

== Historical situation ==
The following chart shows Cape Verde's ratings since 1975 in the Freedom in the World reports, published annually by Freedom House. A rating of 1 is "free"; 7, "not free".^{1}

Historical ratings

| Year | Political Rights | Civil Liberties | Status | President^{2} |
| 1975 | 5 | 5 | Partly Free | Aristides Pereira |
| 1976 | 6 | 6 | Not Free | Aristides Pereira |
| 1977 | 6 | 6 | Not Free | Aristides Pereira |
| 1978 | 6 | 6 | Not Free | Aristides Pereira |
| 1979 | 6 | 6 | Not Free | Aristides Pereira |
| 1980 | 6 | 6 | Not Free | Aristides Pereira |
| 1981 | 6 | 6 | Not Free | Aristides Pereira |
| 1982^{3} | 6 | 6 | Not Free | Aristides Pereira |
| 1983 | 6 | 6 | Not Free | Aristides Pereira |
| 1984 | 6 | 7 | Not Free | Aristides Pereira |
| 1985 | 6 | 7 | Not Free | Aristides Pereira |
| 1986 | 6 | 6 | Not Free | Aristides Pereira |
| 1987 | 5 | 6 | Partly Free | Aristides Pereira |
| 1988 | 5 | 6 | Not Free | Aristides Pereira |
| 1989 | 6 | 5 | Not Free | Aristides Pereira |
| 1990 | 5 | 5 | Partly Free | Aristides Pereira |
| 1991 | 2 | 3 | Free | Aristides Pereira |
| 1992 | 1 | 2 | Free | António Mascarenhas Monteiro |
| 1993 | 1 | 2 | Free | António Mascarenhas Monteiro |
| 1994 | 1 | 2 | Free | António Mascarenhas Monteiro |
| 1995 | 1 | 2 | Free | António Mascarenhas Monteiro |
| 1996 | 1 | 2 | Free | António Mascarenhas Monteiro |
| 1997 | 1 | 2 | Free | António Mascarenhas Monteiro |
| 1998 | 1 | 2 | Free | António Mascarenhas Monteiro |
| 1999 | 1 | 2 | Free | António Mascarenhas Monteiro |
| 2000 | 1 | 2 | Free | António Mascarenhas Monteiro |
| 2001 | 1 | 2 | Free | António Mascarenhas Monteiro |
| 2002 | 1 | 2 | Free | Pedro Pires |
| 2003 | 1 | 1 | Free | Pedro Pires |
| 2004 | 1 | 1 | Free | Pedro Pires |
| 2005 | 1 | 1 | Free | Pedro Pires |
| 2006 | 1 | 1 | Free | Pedro Pires |
| 2007 | 1 | 1 | Free | Pedro Pires |
| 2008 | 1 | 1 | Free | Pedro Pires |
| 2009 | 1 | 1 | Free | Pedro Pires |
| 2010 | 1 | 1 | Free | Pedro Pires |
| 2011 | 1 | 1 | Free | Pedro Pires |
| 2012 | 1 | 1 | Free | Jorge Carlos Fonseca |
| 2013 | 1 | 1 | Free | Jorge Carlos Fonseca |
| 2014 | 1 | 1 | Free | Jorge Carlos Fonseca |
| 2015 | 1 | 1 | Free | Jorge Carlos Fonseca |
| 2016 | 1 | 1 | Free | Jorge Carlos Fonseca |
| 2017 | 1 | 1 | Free | Jorge Carlos Fonseca |
| 2018 | 1 | 1 | Free | Jorge Carlos Fonseca |
| 2019 | 1 | 1 | Free | Jorge Carlos Fonseca |
| 2020 | 1 | 1 | Free | Jorge Carlos Fonseca |
| 2021 | 1 | 1 | Free | Jorge Carlos Fonseca |
| 2022 | 1 | 1 | Free | José Maria Neves |
| 2023 | 1 | 1 | Free | José Maria Neves |

== International treaties ==
Cape Verde's stances on international human rights treaties are as follows:

International treaties

| Treaty | Organization | Introduced | Signed | Ratified |
| Convention on the Prevention and Punishment of the Crime of Genocide | United Nations | 1948 | - | 2011 |
| International Convention on the Elimination of All Forms of Racial Discrimination | United Nations | 1966 | - | 1979 |
| International Covenant on Economic, Social and Cultural Rights | United Nations | 1966 | - | 1993 |
| International Covenant on Civil and Political Rights | United Nations | 1966 | - | 1993 |
| First Optional Protocol to the International Covenant on Civil and Political Rights | United Nations | 1966 | - | 2000 |
| Convention on the Non-Applicability of Statutory Limitations to War Crimes and Crimes Against Humanity | United Nations | 1968 | - | - |
| International Convention on the Suppression and Punishment of the Crime of Apartheid | United Nations | 1973 | - | 1979 |
| Convention on the Elimination of All Forms of Discrimination against Women | United Nations | 1979 | - | 1980 |
| Convention against Torture and Other Cruel, Inhuman or Degrading Treatment or Punishment | United Nations | 1984 | - | 1992 |
| Convention on the Rights of the Child | United Nations | 1989 | - | 1992 |
| Second Optional Protocol to the International Covenant on Civil and Political Rights, aiming at the abolition of the death penalty | United Nations | 1989 | - | 2000 |
| International Convention on the Protection of the Rights of All Migrant Workers and Members of Their Families | United Nations | 1990 | - | 1997 |
| Optional Protocol to the Convention on the Elimination of All Forms of Discrimination against Women | United Nations | 1999 | - | 2011 |
| Optional Protocol to the Convention on the Rights of the Child on the Involvement of Children in Armed Conflict | United Nations | 2000 | - | 2002 |
| Optional Protocol to the Convention on the Rights of the Child on the Sale of Children, Child Prostitution and Child Pornography | United Nations | 2000 | - | 2002 |
| Convention on the Rights of Persons with Disabilities | United Nations | 2006 | 2007 | 2011 |
| Optional Protocol to the Convention on the Rights of Persons with Disabilities | United Nations | 2006 | - | - |
| International Convention for the Protection of All Persons from Enforced Disappearance | United Nations | 2006 | 2007 | - |
| Optional Protocol to the International Covenant on Economic, Social and Cultural Rights | United Nations | 2008 | 2011 | - |
| Optional Protocol to the Convention on the Rights of the Child on a Communications Procedure | United Nations | 2011 | - | - |

== See also ==
- Freedom of religion in Cape Verde
- LGBT rights in Cape Verde
- Politics of Cape Verde

== Notes ==
1. Note that the "Year" signifies the "Year covered". Therefore the information for the year marked 2008 is from the report published in 2009, and so on.
2. As of 8 July (Independence Day) in 1975; 1 January thereafter.
3. The 1982 report covers the year 1981 and the first half of 1982, and the following 1984 report covers the second half of 1982 and the whole of 1983. In the interest of simplicity, these two aberrant "year and a half" reports have been split into three year-long reports through interpolation.
