= Freedom of religion in Cape Verde =

The constitution of Cape Verde provides for freedom of religion, and the government has generally respected this right in practice. Government policy continued to contribute to the generally free practice of religion. There were no reports of societal abuses or discrimination based on religious belief or practice.

== Religious demography ==
Cape Verde is an archipelago consisting of 10 islands, 9 of which are inhabited. It has an area of 1,557 square miles (4,030 km^{2}) and a population of 458,000, according to the National Statistics Institute.

Christianity is the largest religion in Cape Verde, with Roman Catholics having the most adherents. Different sources give varying estimates on the relative sizes of various Christian denominations. In 2020, more than 94% of the population of Cape Verde were Christian, with almost 85% being Roman Catholic. About 5% of the population is Protestant. The largest Protestant denomination is the Church of the Nazarene. Other groups include the Church of the Nazarene, the Assemblies of God, Seventh-day Adventist Church, the Universal Church of the Kingdom of God, independent Baptists and various other Pentecostal and evangelical groups.

There is a small Baháʼí Faith community and a small Muslim community. The number of agnostics is estimated at less than 1% of the population.

== Status of religious freedom ==
=== Legal and policy framework ===
The constitution provides for freedom of religion, and the government generally respected this right in practice. The government at all levels sought to protect this right in full and did not tolerate its abuse, either by governmental or private actors.

The constitution protects the right of individuals to choose and change their religion and to interpret their religious beliefs for themselves.

The Penal Code, which entered into force in 2004, states that violations of religious freedom are crimes subject to a penalty of between 3 months' and 3 years' imprisonment.

There is no state religion. The constitution provides for the separation of church and state and prohibits the state from imposing any religious beliefs and practices.

The Catholic Church enjoys a privileged status in national life. For example, the government provides the Catholic Church with free television broadcast time for religious services. Also, the government observes the Christian holy days of Ash Wednesday, Good Friday, Easter, All Saints' Day, and Christmas as official holidays. Furthermore, each municipality has a holiday to honor its patron saint. The government does not observe any other religious holidays.

The constitution provides for freedom of association. All associations, whether religious or secular, must register with the Ministry of Justice to be recognized as legal entities.

Registration is mandatory under the constitution and the law of associations. There are no special incentives for registering and failure to do so has not resulted in penalty or prosecution. One disadvantage of not registering is the inability of unregistered groups to apply for government or private loans and benefits as an association.

To register, a religious group must submit to the Ministry of Justice a copy of its charter and statutes, signed by the members of the group. The constitution sets forth the criteria for all associations, including religious ones, and states that the association may not be military or armed; may not be aimed at promoting violence, racism, xenophobia, or dictatorship; and may not be in violation of the penal law. Failure to register with the Ministry of Justice does not result in any restriction on religious belief or practice.

== 2020s ==
In 2023, the country was scored 4 out of 4 for religious freedom.

== See also ==
- Religion in Cape Verde
- Christianity in Cape Verde
- Human rights in Cape Verde
