= Islam in Cape Verde =

Islam in Cape Verde is a minority religion with a small community. With 2.8% of the total population, Muslims are mainly immigrants from Senegal and other neighboring countries, and are active in small-scale commerce and souvenir trade.

== Notable Muslims ==
- Logan Costa, footballer
- Félix Mathaus, footballer
- Jamiro Monteiro, footballer
- Steven Moreira, footballer

== See also ==
- Glossary of Islam
- Outline of Islam
- Index of Islam-related articles
- Religion in Cape Verde
