= Telecommunications in Cape Verde =

Telecommunications in Cape Verde include fixed-line and mobile telephone services, radio and television broadcasting, and Internet access. The country's telecommunications system underwent extensive modernization from 1996 to 2000 following partial privatization in 1995. Cellular service was introduced in 1998, a fiber-optic ring linking all islands was completed in 2001, and broadband services were launched in 2004. Cape Verde is a landing point for the Atlantis-2 transatlantic fiber-optic cable.

== Infrastructure and services ==
Telephones - main lines in use: 72 764 (2011)

Telephones - mobile cellular: 496 900 (2011)

Telephone system:
General assessment: effective system, extensive modernization from 1996-2000 following partial privatization in 1995
domestic: major service provider is Cabo Verde Telecom (CVT); fiber-optic ring, completed in 2001, links all islands providing Internet access and ISDN services; cellular service introduced in 1998; broadband services launched in 2004
international: country code - 238; landing point for the Atlantis-2 fiber-optic transatlantic telephone cable that provides links to South America, Senegal, and Europe; HF radiotelephone to Senegal and Guinea-Bissau; satellite earth station - 1 Intelsat (Atlantic Ocean) (2007)

Radio broadcast stations: AM 0, FM 22 (and 12 repeaters), shortwave 0 (2002)

Television broadcast stations: 5 (and 7 repeaters) (2008)

Internet service providers (ISPs): 4 (2008)

Internet Users: 150 000 (2011)

Internet Hosts: 7 308 (2007)

Country code: CV

== See also ==
- Telephone numbers in Cape Verde
- Media of Cape Verde
