= National emblem of Cape Verde =

National Emblem of Cape Verde
- Armiger: Republic of Cabo Verde
- Adopted: 1999
- Shield: The national emblem of Cape Verde contains a circle within which is written the name of the nation in Portuguese; also in this circle are a torch and triangle, symbols of freedom and national unity. The circle is ringed with ten stars, that represent the islands of Cape Verde, and is similar to the symbolism on the flag of Cape Verde. At the top of the shield is a plumbob, a symbol of righteousness; three chain links are at the bottom.
- Motto: República de Cabo Verde "Republic of Cape Verde"

The national emblem of Cape Verde contains a circle within which is written the name of the nation in Portuguese. Within the circle are a torch and triangle, symbols of freedom and national unity. At the top of the shield is a plumbob, a symbol of righteousness; three chain links are at the bottom. This emblem replaces the earlier variant with the seashell that had been in use since independence. The current emblem was adopted in 1999.

== Background and historical arms ==
On 8 May 1935, Portugal introduced a new coat of arms for its colonies, including Cape Verde, São Tomé and Principe, and Guinea-Bissau (then Portuguese Guinea). (Note: published in the Diário do Govêrno) The 1935 arms are described as follows: "All arms were of the same model: divided vertically in such a way that two sub-shields are formed. The dexter was white with five small blue shields each bearing five white discs (i.e. the “quinas cross” representing the motherland). The sinister represented the colony. In the base green and white waves to indicate the overseas location. To complete the badge, the arms were set upon a golden armillary sphere with a golden mural crown." On July 11, 1951, a slightly revised version was introduced, which was used until July 5, 1975.

The replacement flag following independence in 1975, in use from then until 1992, used colours more typical of African nations, with red, green and yellow, almost identical to the flag of Guinea-Bissau. On the left in the red portion of the flag was the coat of arms, in use from July 5, 1975 until September 22, 1992 in its own right. It featured a large black star, surrounded by a saffron-yellow and green maize wreath and a scallop shell in the centre, also of a saffron/amber colour. The independent coat of arms, not used on the flag, featured the same saffron-yellow and green maize wreath and a scallop shell in the centre at the bottom, but the star was smaller and complicated with several other features, including a flag poll and something resembling a book. The current national emblem of Cape Verde was adopted in 1992 at the same time as the national flag, 17 years after the island nation became independent.

=== Gallery ===
Provisional coat of arms of the Portuguese colony of Cape Verde from June 1832, elaborated by Afonso Dornelas and proposed by the Portuguese Institute of Heraldry at the request of the Agency General of the Colonies.

Coat of arms of the Portuguese colony of Cape Verde, from May 8, 1935.

Coat of arms of the Portuguese province of Cape Verde from June 11, 1951.

Escutcheon of the colony and then province from May 8, 1935.

Coat of arms of Cape Verde from July 5, 1975.

Coat of arms of Cape Verde from September 22, 1992 to November 23, 1999.

== Symbolism ==
The circle of the current emblem is ringed with ten stars, that represent the islands of Cape Verde, and is similar to the symbolism on the flag of Cape Verde. The plumbob symbolizes righteousness and uprightness which constitute the "key vault" of Cape Verdean constitution. The equilateral triangle symbolizes unity, equality and people's civil rights recognized by the democratic system. The torch symbolizes freedom gained after many years of struggle. The sea symbolizes nostalgia. The palms symbolize victory won in the struggle for national independence, and the stars represent the ten islands that form the archipelago of Cape Verde.
