= Demographics of Cape Verde =

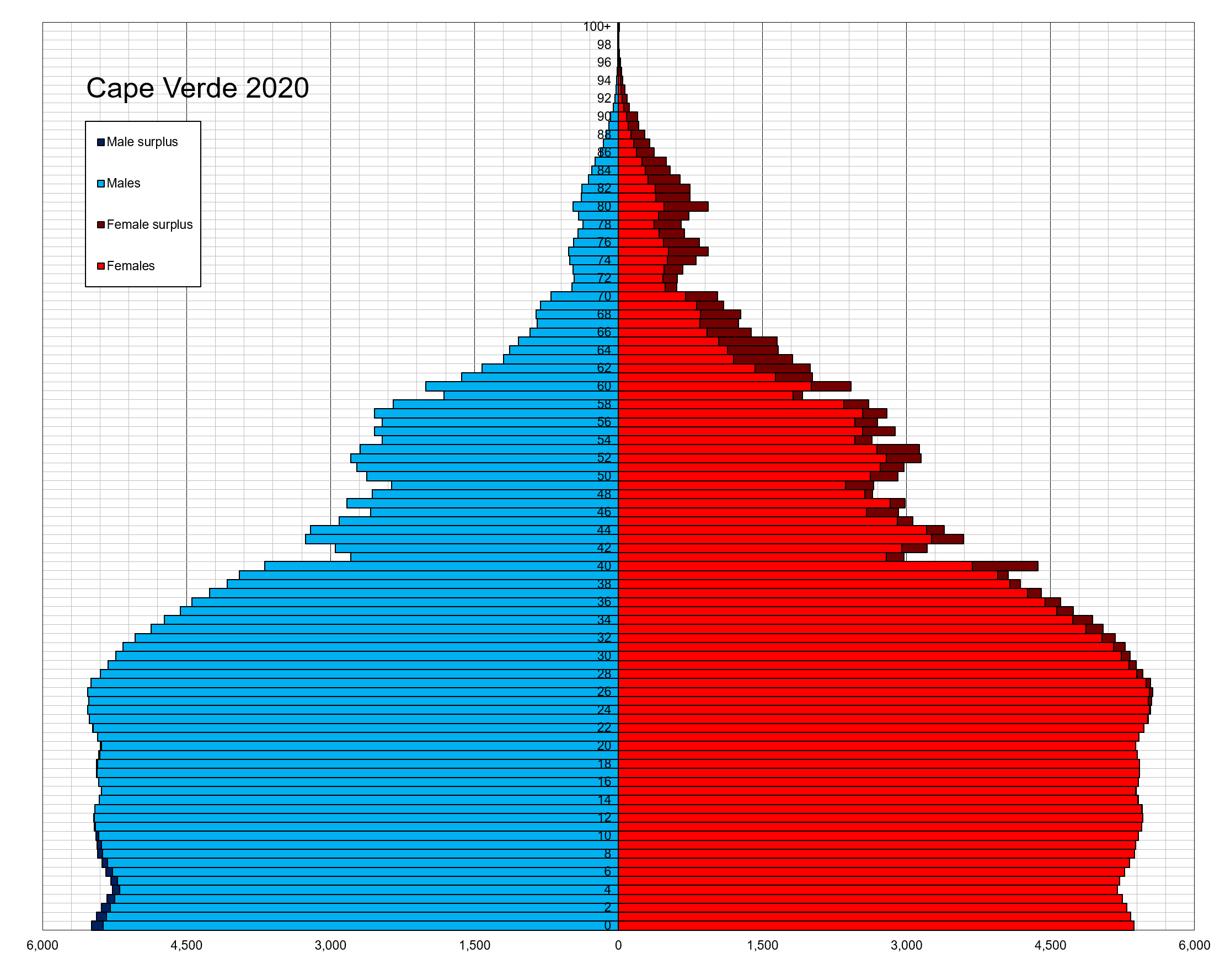
- Population pyramid of Cape Verde in 2020
- Population: 596,707 (2022 est.)
- Growth rate: 1.21% (2022 est.)
- Birth rate: 18.49 births/1,000 population (2022 est.)
- Death rate: 5.8 deaths/1,000 population (2022 est.)
- Life expectancy: 73.75 years
  - male: 71.41 years
  - female: 76.15 years
- Fertility rate: 2.13 children born/woman (2022 est.)
- Infant mortality: 23.53 deaths/1,000 live births
- Net migration rate: -0.57 migrant(s)/1,000 population (2022 est.)
- Immigrant share: 3.1% (2024)

Age structure
- 0–14 years: 27.95%
- 65 and over: 5.48%

Sex ratio
- Total: 0.95 male(s)/female (2022 est.)
- At birth: 1.03 male(s)/female
- Under 15: 1.01 male(s)/female
- 65 and over: 0.52 male(s)/female

Nationality
- Nationality: Cabo Verdean or Cape Verdean

Language
- Official: Portuguese
- Spoken: Cape Verde Creole

Demographic features of the population of Cape Verde include population density, ethnicity, education level, health of the populace, economic status, religious affiliations and other aspects of the population.

Cape Verde has about 540,000 inhabitants. A large proportion (236,000) of Cape Verdeans live on the main island, Santiago. Many more live abroad in the Cape Verdean diaspora in mainland Africa, Europe, U.S., Brazil, et cetera.

The archipelago of Cape Verde was first discovered and claimed by Portuguese sailors working for the Portuguese Crown in 1456. Cape Verdeans are West African. Many foreigners from other parts of the world settled in Cape Verde as their permanent country.

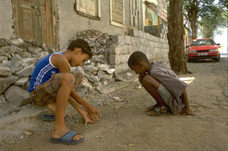
Two Cape Verdean children playing

The difficulty of survival in a country with few natural resources has historically induced Cape Verdeans to emigrate. In fact, of the more than 1 million people of Cape Verdean ancestry in the world, only a little more than one-third actually live on the islands. Some 500,000 people of Cape Verdean ancestry live in the United States, mainly in New England. Many people of Cape Verdean ancestry also live in Portugal, Netherlands, France, Italy and Senegal. Cape Verdean populations also settled Spain, Germany, Canada, and other CPLP countries (Angola, Brazil and Guinea-Bissau). Since independence from Portugal in 1975, a number of Cape Verdean students have continued to be admitted every year to Portuguese high schools, polytechnical institutes and universities, through bilateral agreements between the Portuguese and Cape Verdean governments.

Portuguese functions as a state language. Virtually all formal documents and official declarations are in Portuguese. But it is not the first language. Cape Verdean, commonly called Kriolu, is spoken as a mother tongue by virtually all Cape Verdeans, irrespective of social status or religious affiliation. Moreover, historical linguists often attribute Cape Verdean Creole as the oldest "New World" contact language. It is a "contact" language in the sense that it was born and evolved between linguistically different groups who, by necessity, had to create a common language to communicate with each other. There is a rich repertoire of literature and songs in Cape Verdean Creole. In religion, the majority of Cape Verdeans follow Catholic Christianity. There are some Protestants, Baháʼís and Muslims.

== Population ==
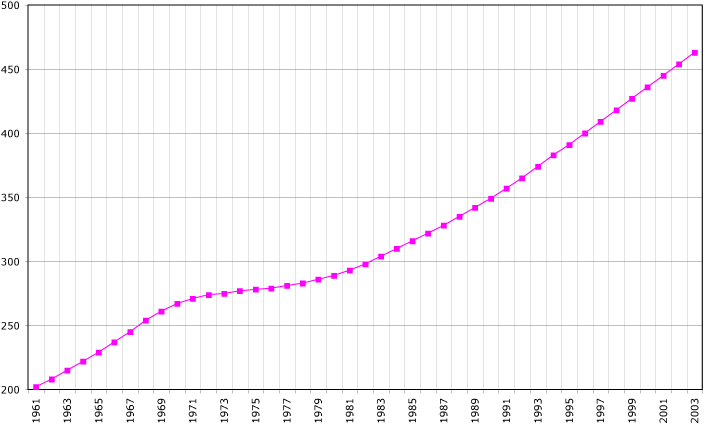
Demographics of Cape Verde, Data of FAO, year 2005; Number of inhabitants in thousands.

Census population
Year	Pop.	±% p.a.
1930	210,500	—
1940	189,984	−1.02%
1950	199,902	+0.51%
1960	270,999	+3.09%
1970	295,703	+0.88%
1980	341,491	+1.45%
2000	431,989	+1.18%
2010	491,875	+1.31%
2021	491,233	−0.01%

According to the 2022 revision of the World Population Prospects the total population was 587,925 in 2021, compared to only 178,000 in 1950. The proportion of children below the age of 15 in 2010 was 31.8%, 62.3% was between 15 and 65 years of age, while 5.9% was 65 years or older.

Population by Sex and Age Group (Census 16.VI.2010):

Age group	Male	Female	Total	%
Total	243 403	248 280	491 683	100
0–4	25 131	25 069	50 200	10.21
5–9	25 168	25 040	50 208	10.21
10–14	27 864	27 361	55 225	11.23
15–19	29 655	29 405	59 060	12.01
20–24	27 327	25 578	52 905	10.76
25–29	23 336	21 005	44 341	9.02
30–34	18 165	16 339	34 504	7.02
35–39	14 106	13 130	27 236	5.54
40–44	12 988	13 303	26 291	5.35
45–49	11 347	12 165	23 512	4.78
50–54	8 162	9 999	18 161	3.69
55–59	4 947	7 196	12 143	2.47
60–64	2 613	3 580	6 193	1.26
65–69	2 499	3 716	6 215	1.26
70–74	3 437	5 229	8 666	1.76
75–79	2 980	4 453	7 433	1.51
80–84	2 092	3 185	5 277	1.07
85–89	827	1 358	2 185	0.44
90–94	377	696	1 073	0.22
95+	172	325	497	0.10
Age group	Male	Female	Total	Percent
0–14	78 163	77 470	155 633	31.65
15–64	152 646	151 700	304 346	61.90
65+	12 384	18 962	31 346	6.38
Unknown	210	148	358	0.07

Population Estimates by Sex and Age Group (01.VII.2020) (Data refer to national projections.):

Age group	Male	Female	Total	%
Total	281 533	275 324	556 857	100
0–4	26 739	25 524	52 264	9.39
5–9	26 162	24 973	51 135	9.18
10–14	25 262	25 389	50 651	9.10
15–19	23 734	23 483	47 218	8.48
20–24	23 955	22 461	46 416	8.34
25–29	28 159	26 015	54 173	9.73
30–34	28 603	24 995	53 597	9.62
35–39	24 111	20 484	44 595	8.01
40–44	18 738	15 923	34 660	6.22
45–49	14 043	12 780	26 822	4.82
50–54	12 282	12 693	24 974	4.48
55–59	10 437	11 557	21 994	3.95
60–64	7 125	9 226	16 351	2.94
65–69	4 080	6 402	10 482	1.88
70–74	2 050	2 955	5 006	0.90
75–79	1 722	2 772	4 494	0.81
80–84	2 037	3 496	5 533	0.99
85–89	1 443	2 389	3 833	0.69
90–94	682	1 249	1 931	0.35
95+	170	560	730	0.13
Age group	Male	Female	Total	Percent
0–14	78 163	75 886	154 049	27.66
15–64	191 186	179 615	370 801	66.59
65+	12 184	19 823	32 007	5.75

Population by Sex and Age Group (Census 16.VI.2021):

Age group	Male	Female	Total	%
Total	246 363	244 870	491 233	100
0–4	23 111	22 429	45 540	9.27
5–9	23 533	23 086	46 619	9.49
10–14	23 809	22 771	46 580	9.48
15–19	21 903	20 401	42 304	8.61
20–24	20 391	18 159	38 550	7.85
25–29	22 481	21 665	44 146	8.99
30–34	22 552	21 681	44 233	9.00
35–39	19 217	18 105	37 322	7.60
40–44	15 820	14 259	30 079	6.12
45–49	12 269	11 347	23 616	4.81
50–54	11 257	11 224	22 481	4.58
55–59	10 001	10 682	20 683	4.21
60–64	7 536	8 765	16 301	3.32
65–69	4 496	6 510	11 006	2.24
70–74	2 347	3 279	5 626	1.15
75–79	1 685	2 842	4 527	0.92
80–84	1 839	3 404	5 243	1.07
85–89	1 257	2 473	3 730	0.76
90–94	648	1 316	1 964	0.40
95+	211	472	683	1.39
Age group	Male	Female	Total	Percent
0–14	70 453	68 286	138 739	28.24
15–64	163 427	156 288	319 715	65.08
65+	12 483	20 296	32 779	6.67

== Vital statistics ==
Vital events of Cape Verde are not (yet) available for recent years. The Population Department of the United Nations prepared the following estimates.

Period	Live births per year	Deaths per year	Natural change per year	CBR*	CDR*	NC*	TFR*	IMR*
1950–1955	9 000	4 000	5 000	49.0	22.6	26.3	6.57	139
1955–1960	10 000	4 000	5 000	48.0	21.1	26.9	6.76	132
1960–1965	10 000	4 000	6 000	45.0	18.7	26.3	6.97	125
1965–1970	11 000	4 000	6 000	41.4	16.4	25.0	6.97	117
1970–1975	12 000	4 000	8 000	41.1	13.4	27.7	6.86	96
1975–1980	13 000	4 000	9 000	41.6	11.6	30.0	6.62	78
1980–1985	13 000	3 000	10 000	41.3	10.3	31.0	6.10	65
1985–1990	14 000	3 000	11 000	40.9	9.2	31.7	5.63	54
1990–1995	14 000	3 000	11 000	36.5	7.9	28.6	4.93	44
1995–2000	13 000	3 000	10 000	31.6	6.7	24.9	4.15	37
2000–2005	12 000	3 000	9 000	26.2	5.8	20.5	3.28	28
2005–2010	11 000	3 000	8 000	21.9	5.2	16.7	2.60	21
* CBR = crude birth rate (per 1000); CDR = crude death rate (per 1000); NC = natural change (per 1000); IMR = infant mortality rate per 1000 births; TFR = total fertility rate (number of children per woman)

=== Registered births and deaths ===
Year	Population	Live births	Deaths	Natural increase	Crude birth rate	Crude death rate	Rate of natural increase	TFR
1948		3,756						
1949		3,904	3,641	263				
1950		5,322	2,562	2,760				
1951		7,367	2,377	4,990				
1952		7,647	2,455	5,192				
1953		7,597	2,866	4,731				
1954		8,697	3,305	5,392				
1955		8,547	2,220	6,327				
1956		8,377	2,200	6,177				
1957		8,237	2,790	5,447				
1958		9,026	2,552	6,474				
1959		9,609	2,382	7,227				
1960		8,954	3,127	5,827				
1961		8,319	2,543	5,776				
1962		8,952	2,452	6,500				
1963		9,671	2,996	6,675				
1964		9,783	2,315	7,468				
1965		9,638	2,377	7,261				
1966		9,621	2,167	7,454				
1967		10,190	2,593	7,597				
1968		10,131	2,397	7,734				
1969		9,671	3,452	6,219				
1970		9,379	2,883	6,496				
1971		9,493	4,147	5,346				
1972		8,966	2,779	6,187				
1973		8,418	3,513	4,905				
1974		8,492	2,576	5,916				
1975		8,210	2,796	5,414				
1976		9,863	2,869	6,994				
1977		9,965	2,564	7,401				
1978		10,060	3,207	6,853				
1979		8,289	2,469	5,820				
1980		9,650	2,080	7,570				
1981		8,580						
1982		11,066	2,169	8,897				
1983		11,438	2,649	8,789				
1984		11,696	2,863	8,833				
1985		11,282	2,735	8,547				
1986		12,636						
1987		12,771						
1988		12,443						
1989								
1990		9,669	2,505	7,164				
1991		12,289	2,616	9,673				
1992		9,671	2,843	6,828				
1993			2,821					
1994								
1995	386,813		3,520			9.1		
1996	393,478		2,715			6.9		
1997	406,267		3,047			7.5		
1998	413,382	15,460	2,811	12,649		6.8		
1999	426,061		2,812			6.6		
2000	436,821	12,746	2,433	10,313	29.2	5.6	23.6	4.00
2001	445,035	12,550	2,396	10,154	28.2	5.4	22.8	
2002	452,198	12,345	2,395	9,950	27.3	5.3	22.0	
2003	460,837	12,120	2,600	9,520	26.3	5.6	20.7	
2004	468,854	11,862	2,522	9,340	25.3	5.4	19.9	
2005	478,163	11,554	2,423	9,131	24.3	5.1	19.2	
2006	487,121	9,765	2,612	7,153	20.7	5.4	15.3	2.443
2007	491,419	10,421	2,484	7,937	21.8	5.2	16.6	2.575
2008	499,796	10,165	2,683	7,482	21.0	5.5	15.5	2.429
2009	485,677	9,962	2,583	7,379	20.4	5.3	15.1	2.334
2010	477,859	10,568	2,352	8,216	22.1	4.9	17.2	2.535
2011	480,577	10,777	2,488	8,289	22.4	5.2	17.2	2.589
2012	483,285	10,050	2,610	7,440	20.8	5.4	15.4	2.419
2013	485,996	9,845	2,518	7,327	20.3	5.2	15.1	2.358
2014	488,719	9,868	2,528	7,340	20.2	5.2	15.0	2.356
2015	491,436	9,794	2,761	7,033	19.9	5.6	14.3	2.330
2016	493,465	9,980	2,591	7,389	20.2	5.3	14.9	2.389
2017	495,522	9,943	2,497	7,446	20.1	5.0	15.1	2.401
2018	497,558	9,551	2,836	6,715	19.2	5.7	13.5	2.327
2019	499,609	9,284	2,771	6,513	18.6	5.5	13.1	2.286
2020	501,657	9,211	2,959	6,252	18.4	5.9	12.5	2.280
2021	504,125	8,607	3,178	5,429	17.1	6.3	10.8	2.147
2022	506,595	7,981	3,032	4,949	15.8	6.0	9.8	1.99
2023	509,078	6,760	2,925	3,835	13.3	5.7	7.6	1.68
2024	511,534	5,999	3,082	2,917	11.7	6.0	5.7	1.52

=== Fertility ===
Total fertility rate (TFR) (wanted fertility rate) and crude birth rate (CBR):

Year	CBR (Total)	TFR (Total)	CBR (Urban)	TFR (Urban)	CBR (Rural)	TFR (Rural)
2005	22	2,9 (2,8)	23	2,7 (2,7)	22	3,1 (3,0)

Fertility data from 2005 (DHS Program):

Region	Total fertility rate	Percentage of women age 15-49 currently pregnant	Mean number of children ever born to women age 40–49
Santo Antão	2.9	3.8	6.0
São Vicente	2.0	3.4	4.0
São Nicolau	3.3	4.4	4.2
Sal	3.2	7.0	3.9
Boa Vista	2.4	10.0	4.4
Maio	2.6	1.7	4.3
Santiago	3.1	5.4	4.5
Praia Urbano	3.2	5.1	4.5
Santiago Norte	2.7	6.2	4.3
Resto Santiago	3.3	4.6	4.8
Fogo	3.1	6.3	5.6
Brava	2.8	7.0	5.0

=== Life expectancy ===
Period	Life expectancy in Years
1950–1955	48.08
1955–1960	▲48.77
1960–1965	▲49.45
1965–1970	▲52.43
1970–1975	▲55.25
1975–1980	▲60.52
1980–1985	▲62.37
1985–1990	▲64.10
1990–1995	▲65.73
1995–2000	▲67.94
2000–2005	▲71.27
2005–2010	▲71.77
2010–2015	▲72.14

== Ethnic groups ==
=== Genetics ===
E1b1a, R1b

The predominance of West African mitochondrial DNA haplotypes in their maternal gene pool, the major West African Y-chromosome lineage E3a was observed only at a frequency of 15.9%. Overall, these results indicate that gene flow from multiple sources and sex-specific patterns have been important in the formation of the genomic diversity in the Cabo Verde islands.

== Languages ==
Portuguese (official), Kriolu

According to results from 2016, 72.8% of the population aged 12 or above could speak a language besides Kriolu, and the vast majority of them spoke Portuguese, the official language of the country and the language from colonial time. Ability to speak non-Kriolu languages also varied greatly by age, with younger generations being substantially more likely to speak a non-creole language.

Percentage of population aged 12 or above by ability to speak various languages
	Any non-creole languages	Portuguese	English	French	Spanish	Italian
Total 12+	72.8	72.2	16.5	13.5	3.0	0.9
12-14	84.8	84.7	8.5	7.0	0.0	0.1
15-24	88.6	88.1	25.0	19.5	1.2	0.3
25-44	79.8	78.8	20.5	15.8	4.3	1.6
45-64	54.6	54.4	7.2	7.8	4.6	0.6
65 +	26.4	26.3	2.6	4.5	1.8	1.1

== Religion ==
Catholic 77.3%, Protestant 3.7% (includes Church of the Nazarene 1.7%, Adventist 1.5%, Universal Kingdom of God 0.4%, and God and Love 0.1%), other Christian 4.3% (includes Christian Rationalism 1.9%, Jehovah's Witness 1%, Assembly of God 0.9%, and New Apostolic 0.5%), Islam 1.8%, Other 1.3%, None 10.8%, Unspecified 0.7% (2010 estimate)
