= 2009–10 in Cape Verdean football =

Football in Cape Verde
- Season: 2009–10

Men's football
- 2010 Cape Verdean Football Championships: Boavista FC

In the 2009–10 season of competitive football (soccer) in Cape Verde: The 3rd Cape Verdean Cup took place that year.

== Diary of the season ==
- Brava Island Cup and Super Cup held their first editions
- Taça da Ilha do Maio or Taça Djarmai and the Super-Taça da Ilha do Maio or Super-Taça Djarmai was established
- March 13: Juventude da Furna football (soccer) club established in Brava
- Sporting Clube da Boa Vista won their only title for Boa Vista
- SC Morabeza won their 5th and recent title for Brava
- Botafogo FC won their 17th and recent title for Fogo
- Barreirense won their 2nd and recent title for Maio
- Académico do Aeroporto won their 10th title for Sal
- Scorpion Vermelho won their 3rd title for Santiago North
- Sporting Clube da Praia won their title for Santiago South
- Solpontense won their 4th and recent title (6th overall for Santo Antão) for Santo Antão North
- Marítimo do Porto Novo won their 2nd and recent title for Santo Antão South
- Desportivo Ribeira Brava won their 4th and recent title for São Nicolau
- Batuque FC won their 3rd title for São Vicente
- Académica do Sal won their second and recent cup title for Sal
- May 8: 2010 Cape Verdean Football Championships began
- May 15: Sporting Praia defeated Ribeira Brava 2-7 and made it the highest scoring match and the largest goal difference until May 30
- May 30: Boavista defeated Solpontense 7-1 which made it the season's highest scoring match
- June 5: Regular season ends
- June 20: Knockout stage begins
- July 3: Championship finals begins
- July 11: Boavista FC won their 3rd and recent national championship title

== Final standings ==
=== Cape Verdean Football Championships ===
Batuque and Académico do Aeroporto were first in each group, second place Group A club Boavista advanced with 8 points and second place Group B club Sporting Praia advanced with 11 points and scored the most with 16 goals, Boavista was second with 15 goals. Sporting advanced to the finals with 2 goals scored while Boavista advanced with a goal scored away in the second match. Boavista defeated Sporting 2-0 in the first match and 0-1 in the final match and Boavista went to win their 3rd and recent title.

=== Group A ===
Pos	Team	Pld	W	D	L	GF	GA	GD	Pts
1	Batuque FC	5	2	3	0	9	3	+6	9
2	Boavista FC	5	2	2	1	15	8	+7	8
3	Marítimo	5	2	1	2	7	9	-2	7
4	SC Morabeza	5	1	3	1	5	4	+1	6
5	Botafogo	5	1	2	2	8	13	-5	5
6	Solpontense FC	5	1	1	3	7	14	-7	4

=== Group B ===
Pos	Team	Pld	W	D	L	GF	GA	GD	Pts
1	Académico do Aeroporto	5	4	1	0	12	4	+8	13
2	Sporting Clube da Praia	5	3	2	0	16	6	+10	11
3	Scorpion Vermelho	5	2	0	3	7	8	-1	6
4	Sporting Clube da Boa Vista	5	1	2	2	4	8	-4	5
5	Desportivo Ribeira Brava	5	1	1	3	6	12	-6	4
6	Barreirense	5	0	0	5	5	12	-7	0

==== Final Stages ====
Semi-Finals				Finals
Boavista FC	0	1	1
Académico do Aeroporto	0	1	1	Boavista FC	2	1	3
Sporting Clube da Praia	1	1	2	Sporting Clube da Praia	0	0	0
Batuque FC	0	1	1

Leading goalscorer: Fufura - 5 goals

=== Cape Verdean Cup ===
The third Cape Verdean Cup took place. Boavista Praia won their 2nd and recent cup title after being winner in the final round after defeating in two matches with the most goals scored.

==== Participants ====
- Sport Sal Rei Club, winner of the Boa Vista Island Cup
- Botafogo, winner of the Fogo Island Cup
- Barreirense, winner of the Maio Island Cup
- Juventude, winner of the Sal Island Cup
- No participant from the Santiago North Zone
- Boavista Praia, winner of the Santiago South Zone Cup
- Solpontense, winner of the Santo Antão North Cup
- Marítimo Porto Novo, winner of the Santo Antão South Cup
- Talho, winner of the São Nicolau Cup
- Batuque, winner of the São Vicente Cup

=== Island or regional competitions ===
==== Regional Championships ====
Competition	Winners	
Competition	Premier	Second
Boa Vista	Sporting Boa Vista	
Brava	SC Morabeza	
Fogo	Botafogo FC	Nova Era
Maio	Barreirense	
Sal	Académico do Aeroporto	
Santiago North Zone	Scorpion Vermelho	
Santiago South Zone	Sporting Praia	Celtic da Praia
Santo Antão North Zone	Solpontense	
Santo Antão South Zone	Marítimo do Porto Novo	
São Nicolau	Desportivo Ribeira Brava	
São Vicente	Batuque FC	Ponta d'Pom

==== Regional Cups ====
Competition	Winners
Boa Vista	Sport Sal Rei Club
Brava	SC Morabeza
Fogo	Botafogo
Maio	Barreirense
Sal	Juventude
Santiago South Zone	Boavista Praia
Santo Antão North Zone	Solpontense
Santo Antão South Zone	Marítimo Porto Novo
São Nicolau	Talho
São Vicente	Batuque

==== Regional Super Cups ====
The 2009 champion winner played with a 2009 cup winner

(When a club won both, a second place club
from the regional cup also competed.)

Competition	Winners
Fogo	Canceled
Maio	Barreirense
Sal	Unknown
Santiago North	
Santo Antão North Zone	Inter Porto Novo
Santo Antão South Zone	Not held
São Nicolau	Desportivo Ribeira Brava
São Vicente	Batuque

==== Regional Opening Tournaments ====
Competition	Winners
Boa Vista	Unknown
Brava	No competition
Fogo	
Maio	
Sal	Académico do Aeroporto
Santiago North Zone	
Santiago South Zone	
Santo Antão North Zone	Not held
Santo Antão South Zone	
São Nicolau	Unknown
São Vicente	Not held

== Transfer deals ==
=== Summer-Fall transfer window ===
The September/October transfer window runs from the end of the previous season in September up to October.

- (Cape Verde) Aires Marques from CS Mindelense to (Portugal) Sertanense F.C.
- (Cape Verde) Babanco from Boavista Praia to (Portugal) Arouca
- (Cape Verde) Caló from al-Shamaal Qatar to SC Santa Maria
- (Cape Verde) Figo from Amabox Barcelona Tarrafal to Sporting Clube da Praia
- (Cape Verde) Rambé from CS Mindelense to (Portugal) Macedo de Cavaleiros
- (Cape Verde) Rody from SC Santa Maria to (Portugal) FC Porto
- (Cape Verde) Sténio from Académica do Mindelo to CS Mindelense
- (Cape Verde) Tom Tavares from Sporting Praia to (Portugal) Anadia

== See also ==
- 2009 in Cape Verde
- 2010 in Cape Verde
- Timeline of Cape Verdean football
