= Sal Regional Football Association =

- Founded: 1975
- Locations: Espargos; Estádio Marcelo Leitão
- Affiliations: Cape Verdean Football Federation
- Website: Official website
- Remarks: Domestic cup: Sal Island Cup; Sal Island Super Cup; Sal Island Opening Tournament

The Sal Regional Football Association (Portuguese: Associação Regional de Futebol do Sal, abbreviation: ARFS) is a football (soccer) association covering the island of Sal. It is headquartered in the city of Espargos, the island capital.

== About the Island/Regional League ==
The area includes the whole island of Sal and includes its surrounding islets.

== Organization ==
The association also organizes and functions the Sal Regional Championships, the Cup, the Super Cup and the Opening Tournament. The association has 13 registered clubs, Santa Maria, Académica do Aeroporto do Sal and Académica do Sal are semi-pro clubs. The regional champion competes in the National Championships each season, once did in the cup (2007, 2009, 2010, 2012) competition who competed at the national level. The regional championships has two divisions.

- Sal Premier Division (8 clubs)
- Sal Second Division (5 clubs)

== History ==
The island league was founded in 1975 after Cape Verde became independent and became the third oldest island championships alongside Fogo and after Santiago. The regional championships contained only six clubs and was the only region that not a single new club were added until 2014 when six new clubs were added and the Second Division were added as Sal's population grew. In 2015, the Premier Division were added and for the 2015–16 season, it would feature eight clubs and the Second Division was reduced to four but awaiting new clubs in that division. Pretória, based in the east of Espargos competed for the first time on March 27, 2017, and became the 13th and recent club on the island.

In 1999, the Sal Island Cup was founded, later in 2000, the Super Cup and Opening Tournament competitions were founded.

As ARFS was used for the Santiago Regional Football Association, until 2002 during its final dissolution of the organization, Sal's abbreviation was read as ARFSL.

Up to 2005, the championships had the second most clubs in the nation and up to 2011 was shared with Brava's. Up to 2014, it was the championships that had the fewest clubs. From 2015 to 2016, it had the same number of clubs as that of Maio, since March 2017, it has a club more than Maio's.

Recently of club participations in the Premier Division. ASGUI, a new participant was the first club ever to be relegated. Until May 2017, neither of the original six clubs was relegated, Verdun Pedra de Lume was the second unrelegated club to relegate as they finished last and first of the original six.

== Registered clubs ==
The region's registered clubs as of October 2017 include:

Club	Location	Founded	Registered
Académico do Aeroporto do Sal	Espargos	1966	1975
Académica do Sal	Espargos	1965	1975
ASGUI	Santa Maria		2014
Chã de Matias	Chã de Matias, Espargos		2014
Florença	Santa Maria	1995	2014
Gaviões	Hortelã, Espoargos		2014
JURF (Jovens Unidos)	Ribeira Funda, Espargos	1988	2014
Juventude	Morro Curral, Espargos	1962	1975
Nova Geração	East Espargos		2014
Oásis FC			2017
Palmeira	Santa Maria		1975
GDRC Pretória	Pretória, Espargos	1991	2016
SC Santa Maria	Santa Maria	1937	1975
Verdun	Pedra de Lume	1945	1975

== See also ==
- Sports in Sal, Cape Verde
