= Djô de Pedra de Lume =

Cape Verdean association football player (died 2015)

Personal information
- Full name: José Rocha Fernandes
- Date of birth: 1953 or 1954
- Place of birth: Pedra de Lume, Portuguese Cape Verde
- Date of death: 26 July 2015 (aged 61)
- Place of death: Pedra de Lume, Cape Verde
- Position: Goalkeeper

Senior career*
Years	Team	Apps	(Gls)
- Académico do Aeroporto
- FC Juventude
- Académica do Sal
- Verdun
- Boavista
- Ribeira Bote de São Vicente

International career
1978–????	Cape Verde		
- * Club domestic league appearances and goals

José Rocha Fernandes (1953/1954 – 26 July 2015), also known as Djô de Pedra de Lume, was a Cape Verdean footballer, who played as a goalkeeper for the Cape Verde national team. He is considered one of the best Cape Verdean goalkeepers of all time.

In 2022, he was selected as part of the IFFHS's all-time Cape Verde men's dream team.

== Career ==
Djô played in the first match ever for the Cape Verde national team, a 1–0 defeat to Guinea on 19 April 1978. Additionall, he played matches for the Sal regional football team.

During his career, Djô also played futsal as a striker.

== Personal life and death ==
The name Djô de Pedra de Lume refers to his hometown of Pedra de Lume. Prior to his death, Djô had one of his legs amputated. The training center of the Cape Verdean Football Federation in Espargos is named after him.

=== Death ===
Djô died on 26 July 2015, at the age of 61, after suffering an acute myocardial infarction.
