= Sports in Sal, Cape Verde =

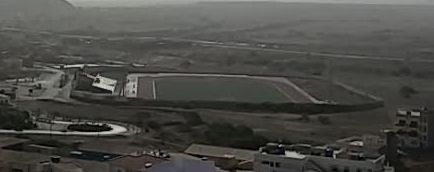
Estádio Marcelo Leitão, one of three sports stadiums of the island

The island of Sal in Cape Verde in the east of the Barlavento Islands is home to several teams and clubs. The major professional club may now be Académico do Aeroporto do Sal, the remaining clubs are amateur or beginners. In 1976, Sal would have its own island championships of each sport. The football competition was the third along with Fogo to have its own first held in 1976 after the nation's independence. Since 2014, the football (soccer) was the only competition divided into two divisions.

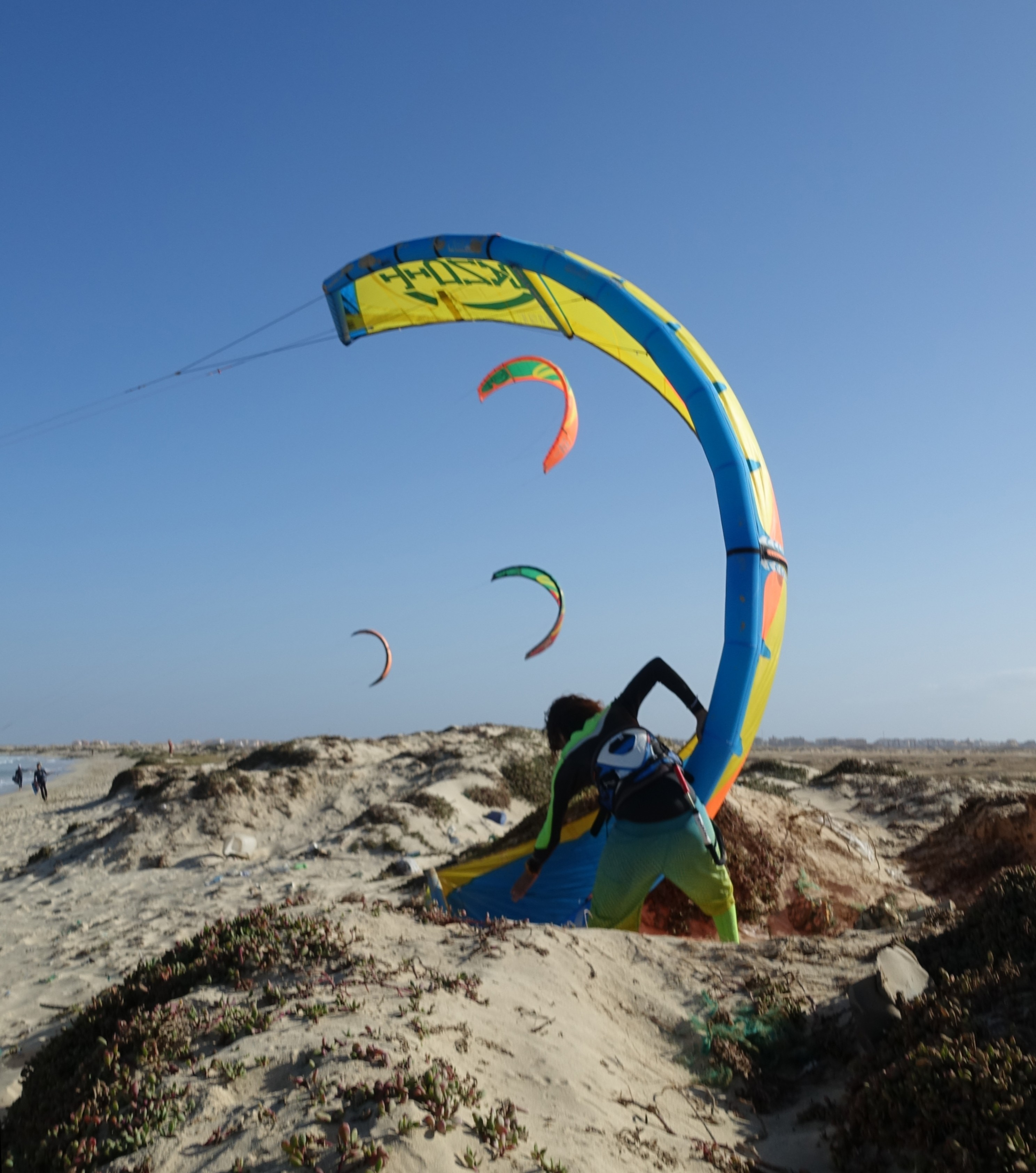
Kite surfing at Costa da Fragata, Sal is being the common of kite surfing in Cape Verde

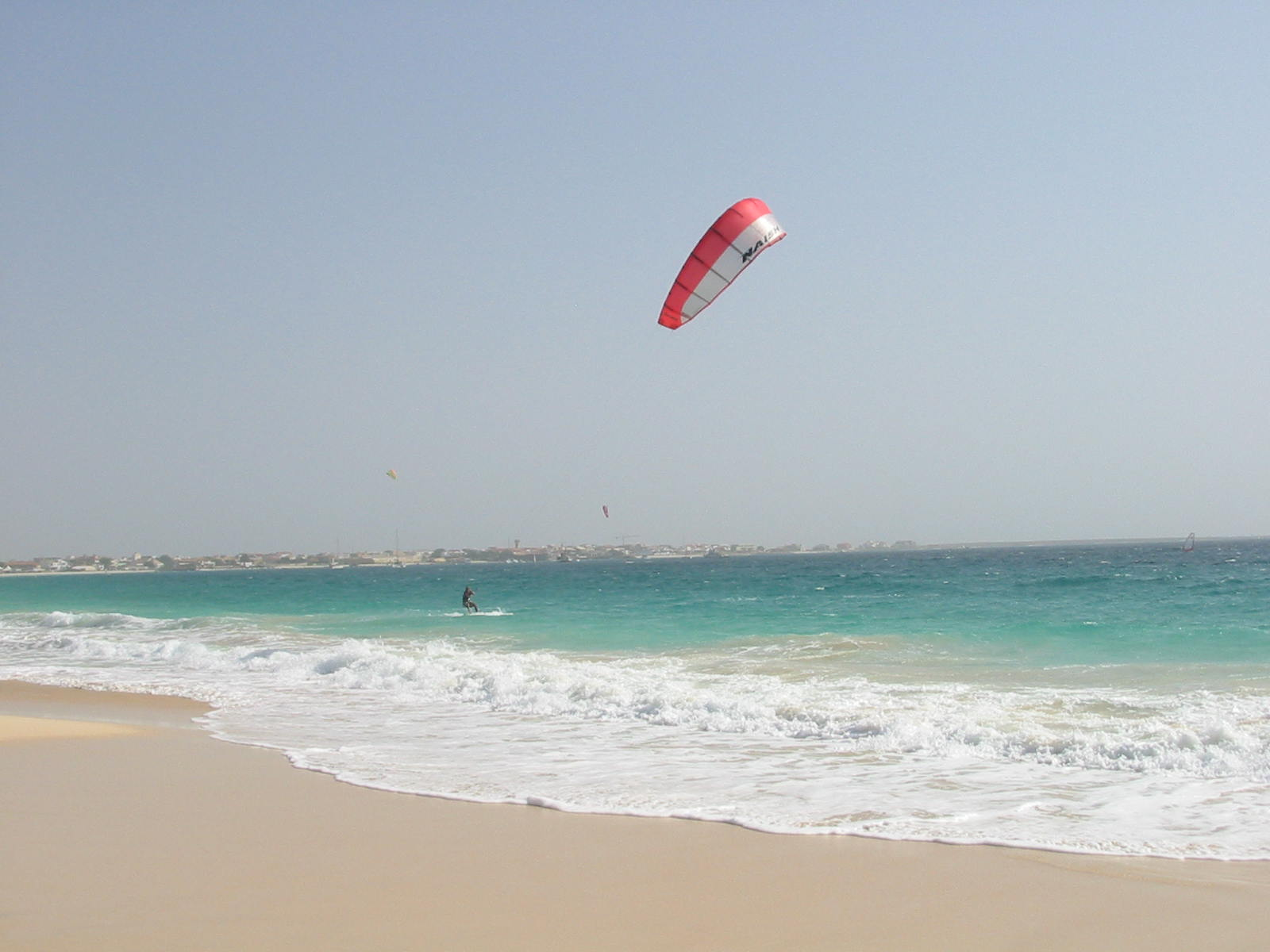
Windsurfing at Santa Maria Beach (Praia de Santa Maria), Sal being the commonplace of the sport today in Cape Verde

== Football (soccer) ==
Football (soccer) remains to be the most popular sport both in the island and the nation. The island has 13 football (soccer) clubs in two divisions governed by the Sal Regional Football Association.

Sal was the third island to have a football (soccer) club known as SC Santa Maria, founded in what was the island capital in 1939. SC Verdun, based in Pedra de Lume was founded in 1945. At the time, Sal was the least inhabited island in the archipelago, with a population of around 1,000. GD Palmeira (now as Palmeira de Santa Maria) was later founded. The airport settlement was founded around 1948 around the island's airport now known as Amílcar Cabral, the next football clubs would be created in Espargos, starting with Juventude in 1962, Académica do Sal in 1963 and the island wide Académico do Aeroporto in 1966. At the time, Sal was only around 2,000 and football activity was the least in Cape Verde alongside Brava.

From the 1990s, the island's population grew which led to the creation of new clubs. They include ASGUI and Florença, based in Santa Maria founded in the 1990s and several more Espargos clubs were formed, each based in a neighborhood including GDRC Pretória and Gaviões.

Académica do Sal and Académico do Aeroporto do Sal are the only clubs who won a national championship football titles, the first was won in 1993 and the last was won in 2003.

Until 2014, Sal had only six registered clubs and the others were unregistered and had only one division. The number of clubs were the least in Cape Verde, in the 1980s, the number of clubs were equal with Brava's.

Of the 13 existing clubs, the largest are concentrated in Espargos numbering 9 out of 13. Santa Maria has four clubs and Pedra Lume with only one.

Since 1976, the winner of the island championships heads to the national championship game each season.

Only Académica do Sal have competed in the continental competitions.

Overall, Espargos has the most titles won numbering 26, second is Santa Maria with eight and last is Pedra de Lume with two.

Also there are two regional cup competitions, super cup competitions in which features a champion and a cup winner (sometimes a second place cup winner when a champion is also a cup winner) and an opening tournament. The cup competition was founded in 1999.

The island also features some other tournaments, the recent being the Armed Forces Cup first held in the 2016-17 season.

== Basketball ==
Basketball is the second most popular sport on the island. Its most popular clubs are Académico do Aeroporto and Académica do Sal, one of the newest clubs is GDRC Pretória. Basketball competitions began around the 1990s.

Basketball venues is Polidesportivo (Municipal) do Sal, Santa Maria has yet to have its own arena and had plans to construct its own arena.

== Volleyball ==
Volleyball is another sport in Cape Verde, one of the most popular. Its popular club on the island is Académico do Aeroporto do Sal. All of its matches are played at Polidesportivo do Sal. Beach volley is another sport played mainly in Santa Maria in the south of the island.

== Other sports ==
When tourism thrived in the 1980s and the 1990s which partly boomed its population to more than 10,000 in the mid-1990s and over 20,000 in the late 2000s. Kite surfing, sailing, windsurfing became popular and rose, during the 1990s and the 2000s, it risen dramatically, it became the commonplace of these sports in the archipelago surpassing São Vicente and nearby Boa Vista islands. Most of the kite surfing and windsurfing are in the area of Santa Maria, Costa da Fragata and north of it.

Futsal, athletics, water polo and chess are other sports on the island, with its popularity quickly soared with its population growth in recent decades.

Athletics are competed at the Estádio Marcelo Leitão, the other is in Santa Maria. Futsal matches are played at Polidesportivo do Sal.

== Sporting events ==
Some of the National Championship final matches took place several times at Estádio Marcelo Leitão in 1993, in 2003 and in 2006.

== Stadium and arenas ==
| Stadium | Town / City | Capacity | Type | Tenants | Region | Opened |
|---|---|---|---|---|---|---|
| Estádio Marcelo Leitão | Espargos | 8,000 | Football; Athletics | Académica do Sal, Académico do Aeroporto, Gaviões, Juventude, Verdun Pedra de Lume | Sal | |
| Patina, Estádio de | Espargos | | Football | Os Gaviões, JURF (Ribeira Funda), GDRC Pretória | Sal | c 1990 (field); 2017 (stadium) |
| Pedra de Lume, Campo de | Espargos | | Football | Verdun Pedra de Lume | Sal | |
| Sal, Polidesportivo do | Espargos | | Basketball; Volleyball; Futsal | Académico do Aeroporto, GDRC Pretória | Sal | |
| Santa Maria, Estádio Municipal do | Santa Maria | 2,000 | Football | ASGUI, Florença de Santa Maria, Palmeira de Santa Maria, SC Santa Maria | Sal | c. 2012 |

=== Smaller football (soccer) fields ===
- Campo de Palmeira
- Campo de Palmeira do Este
- Campo de Pedra de Lume
- Santa Maria Beach Volley Complex

== See also ==
- Sport in Cape Verde

Sport in other islands:

- Sports in Fogo, Cape Verde
- Sports in Santiago, Cape Verde
- Sports in Santo Antão, Cape Verde
- Sports in São Vicente, Cape Verde
