= SC Verdun =

Sport Clube Verdun
- Founded: May 1, 1945
- Ground: Pedra de Lume and Estádio Marcelo Leitão, Sal Island, Cape Verde
- Chairman: Alcindo Conceição Silva
- Manager: Domingo Gomes
- League: Sal Island League
- 2016–17: 8th, relegated
Home colours	Away colours

Sport Club Verdun (Capeverdean Crioulo, ALUPEC or ALUPEK: Sport Klubi Verdun, also in the São Vicente Crioulo: Sport Klube Verdun) is an association football club that plays in the Sal Island League in Cape Verde. The team is based in the village of Pedra de Lume in the east of the island of Sal, though they play in Espargos' stadium, the home field which is made up of dirt is rarely used for practices. Its current chairman is Alcindo Conceição Silva and its current manager is Domingo Gomes who replaced Djulhiano Santos which he now manages Juventude.

== History ==
The club was founded on May 1, 1945, and is the second oldest club on the island after SC Santa Maria.

The club celebrated its 25th anniversary in 1970. The team won their first island title in 1980 and failed to proceed in the national championships.

Later, Verdun celebrated its 50th anniversary in 1995. In 2001, Verdun won their only regional cup title and proceeded them into the regional super cup where they would be victorious after defeating Académica do Sal and won their first of two titles.

Verdun finished first in Sal and won their second and last title in 2014, their next in 34 years. Their second and recent appearance in the nationals was in 2014, no wins were made, four losses were made, they had only a point made at their first match of the season, a two-goal draw with Académica do Fogo.

Verdun's total regional championship titles were shared with GD Palmeira as fifth and last until 2018, Verdun is now solely last in the most regional championship titles and is ranked sixth. Verdun appeared in the 2014 regional super cup and claimed their second and last title, where they defeated the cup winner Juventude.

The club were moderate for the next two seasons with a slight slip in position, Verdun finished fourth with 12 points, 3 wins and draws and seven goals were scored. Verdun played in the extended 2016 season which had some successes, they finished with 19 points and had six wins, a draw and scored 18 goals, the only unsuccessful was they finished fifth. That started the three-year downturn for the club, the first the introduction of the Second Division in 2014 led by the growing population of the island, a year later, the relegation of a last place club.

In the 2016–17 season, the club was trapped in last place and would be for the whole season, it was the final downturn for the club and also being the fall of Verdun Pedra de Lume. Verdun Pedra de Lume became the second club to be relegated and became the first of the original six to be relegated and next season, a Second Division club. Verdun conceded the most goals for most of the time, at the 13th round, the club conceded 23 goals. On April 30, Santa Maria's big win over Gaviões now has Verdun the second most (24) to Gaviões' 30. Verdun Pedra de Lume finished with four points and had four draws and had 10 losses, 5 goals were scored. Domingo Gomes later lost his job as coach for Verdun.

Verdun's first ever Second Division participation was the Opening Tournament, they headed up to the final GDRC Pretória 3–1 at extra time as the match had a goal draw during regulation. They won their only Second Division's Opening Tournament title for 2017. Verdun Pedra de Lume started the 2017–18 Second Division season, a few rounds later, Verdun Pedra de Lume was second behind the new entrant Oásis Atlântico and remained in that position as of the sixth round. Two rounds later, they were etching for a return into the Premier Division or remain in the Second Division next season as they were second with 14 points, six less than Oásis Atlântico. Verdun made a two-goal draw with the newcomer Oásis Atlântico, after Verdun completely lost a chance of returning to the Premier Division and will spend another season in the Second Division next season, The final match would be the highest in the second Division, an 0–6 win over Nova Geração, they scored a total of 21 goals, behind Oásis Atlântico. Verdun Pedra de Lume finished second with 18 points, five less than Oásis Atlântico.

== Stadium ==
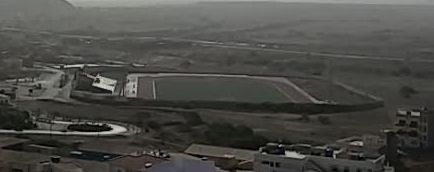
The home field of Verdun Pedra de Lume

Estádio Marcelo Leitão is a multi-use stadium in Espargos, Cape Verde. It is currently used mostly for football matches. The stadium holds 8,000. The stadium has seat rows in the east side and is east-southeast of the city center and Monte Curral. The stadium is home to the two best football clubs on the island, Académico do Aeroporto and Académica do Sal, other clubs based in Espargos includes Juventude which is based in Morro Curral and the stadium is being located inside the neighborhood. Other clubs based in Espargos but a neighborhood includes the newly established clubs of Gaviões and Chã de Matias. Clubs playing the stadium but based on other parts of the island include Santa Maria, Pedra de Lume or Verdun, Palmeira de Santa Maria, ASGUI and Florença.

== Logo ==
Its logo features a crest and are colored yellow on left and green on right, the first letters of the club name SCV goes from top to the bottom and has the shovel and a digger, the words work, sport and unity ("trabalho, desporto, unidade" in Portuguese) are read on the middle and progress ("progresso" in Portuguese) in the yellow ribbon.

== Honours ==
- Sal Island Championships: 2

1979/80, 2013/14

- Taça Dja d'Sal: 1

2000/01

- Sal Island SuperCup: 2

2000/01, 2013/14

=== Secondary achievement ===
- Sal Opening Tournament Second Division: 1

2017

== League and cup history ==
=== National championship ===
Season	Div.	Pos.	Pl.	W	D	L	GS	GA	GD	P	Cup	Notes	Playoffs
2014	1B	6	5	0	1	4	3	7	+4	1		Did not advance	Did not participate

=== Island/Regional Championship ===
Season	Div.	Pos.	Pl.	W	D	L	GS	GA	GD	P	Cup	Tour	Notes
2013–14	2	1	10	6	2	2	15	9	+6	20		Winner	Promoted into the National Championships
2014–15	2	4	10	3	3	4	7	9	-2	12			
2015–16	2	5	14	6	1	7	18	24	-6	19			
2016–17	2	8	14	0	4	10	5	24	-19	4			Relegated into the Regional Second Division

== Statistics ==
- Best position at a cup competition: 1st (regional)
- Appearances at a regional cup competition: 18
- Appearances at regional super cup competition: 2
- Worst position: 2nd – Second Division, in 2018
- Worst season: 2017 (10 losses)

== Current squad ==
As of February 19, 2017

Note: Flags indicate national team as defined under FIFA eligibility rules; some limited exceptions apply. Players may hold more than one non-FIFA nationality.

No.	Pos.	Nation	Player
1	GK	CPV	Euro
2	DF	CPV	J. Pinto
3		CPV	Ary
5	DF	CPV	Ivan
7		CPV	Alex (A)
8	FW	CPV	Walter
9		CPV	Fafe (A)
10	MF	CPV	Ravi
11		CPV	To (Note: Also written as Tó)

No.	Pos.	Nation	Player
12	GK	CPV	Tedi (Note: Sometimes as Teddy)
13	DF	CPV	Kuke
14		CPV	Alex (B)
15	FW	CPV	Vidjay
16	DF	CPV	Fabio
17	MF	CPV	Ricardo
18	MF	CPV	Vla (Note: Also written as Vlá)
19		CPV	Robace
20	MF	CPV	Diabom

== Chairmen history ==
- (Cape Verde) Zéu Soares
- (Cape Verde) Tuche (Paulo Jorge)
- (Cape Verde) Alcindo Conceição Silva

== Managerial history ==
Name	Nationality	From	To
Djulinano Santos	Cape Verde		up to October 2015
Domingo Gomes	Cape Verde	October 2015	late 2017
Zeu Soares	Cape Verde	since late 2017	
