= Sal Island Super Cup =

Sal Island SuperCup
- Founded: 2000
- Region: Sal Island, Cape Verde
- Current champions: Académico do Aeroporto
- Most championships: probably Académico do Aeroporto

The Sal Island Super Cup (Portuguese: Super Copa da Ilha do Sal, Capeverdean Crioulo, ALUPEC or ALUPEK: Super Kopa da Idja du Sal, Sal Crioulo: Super Taça Dja d'Sal São Vicente Crioulo: Super Kopa da Ilha d' Sal) is a SuperCup competition played during the season in the island of Sal, Cape Verde. The competition is organized by the Sal Regional Football Association (Associação Regional de Futebol de Sal, ARFS). The regional winner competes with the cup winner. Sometimes, if a champion also has a cup title, a cup club who is runner-up qualifies.

The first super cup competition began in 2000.

Since 2012, the super cup is also known as Supertaça Sança Gomes.

Académico do Aeroporto has likely won the most Super Cup titles on the island.

The upcoming super cup edition will feature Palmeira, to qualify as champions and Santa Maria, to qualify as a cup winner.

== Winners ==
Season	Winner	Score	Runner-up
1999/2000	Sport Clube Verdun		GD Palmeira
2000/01	Sport Clube Verdun		Académica do Sal
2002-07	not held		
2007/08	Académico do Aeroporto		Académica do Sal
2008/09	Sport Club Santa Maria		Académico do Aeroporto
2009/10	unknown		
2010/11	Académico do Aeroporto		Académica do Sal
2011/12	GD Palmeira		Juventude
2012/13	Académico do Aeroporto		GD Palmeira
2013/14	Sport Clube Verdun		Juventude
2014/15	Académico do Aeroporto		GD Palmeira
2015-16	Académico do Aeroporto		Juventude
2016-17	Académico do Aeroporto	1-1 (4-2 p)	Académica do Sal

=== Performance By Club ===
Listed titles only

Club	Winners	Winning years
Académico do Aeroporto	6	2009, 2011, 2013, 2015, 2016, 2017
Sport Clube Verdun	2	2000, 2014
GD Palmeira	1	2012
Sport Club Santa Maria	1	2009

=== Performance by area ===
Listed titles only. Italics indicate that the super cup competition is not yet held as two participants are based in the same area.

Settlement or city	Winners	Winning years
Espargos	5	2009, 2011, 2013, 2015, 2016, 2017
Santa Maria	2 listed	2009, 2012
Pedra de Lume	3 listed	2000, 2001, 2014

== See also ==
- Sal Island Cup
- Sal Island Opening Tournament
- Sal Island League
- Sports in Sal, Cape Verde
