= 2004 Cape Verdean Football Championships =

Cape Verdean Football Championship
- Season: 2004
- Champions: SC Sal Rei
- Matches played: 31
- Goals scored: 93 (3 per match)
- Top goalscorer: Ravs (11)

The 2004 Cape Verdean Football Championship season was the 25th of the competition of the first-tier football in Cape Verde. Its started on 8 May and finished on 10 July, earlier than the last season. The tournament was organized by the Cape Verdean Football Federation.

== Overview ==
Académico do Aeroporto was the defending team of the title. A total of 11 clubs participated in the competition, one from each island league. No club participated from the Santo Antão Island League (South) due to the regional championship was not held, again in several seasons, also the champion of a previous season competed at the nationals, Académico do Aeroporto from the island of Sal participated. As that club were also regional winners, again a runner-up of the regionals qualified and was Santa Maria from the south of the island. A total of 93 goals were scored, Ravs scored the most numbering 11 (more than 10% of the total).

There were no competition in the first week of July due to the municipal elections that were taking place.

== Participating clubs ==

Participating football (soccer) clubs of the 2004 Cape Verdean Football Championships (Cape Verde)
- Académico do Aeroporto, winner of the 2003 Cape Verdean Football Championships
- SC Sal Rei, winner of the Boa Vista Island League
- Nô Pintcha, winner of the Brava Island League
- Vulcânicos FC, winner of the Fogo Island League
- Onze Unidos, winner of the Maio Island League
- SC Santa Maria, runner up of the Sal Island League
- Estrela dos Amadores, winner of the Santiago Island League (North)
- Académica da Praia, winner of the Santiago Island League (South)
- Paulense Desportivo Clube, winner of the Santo Antão Island League (North)
- FC Ultramarina, winner of the São Nicolau Island League
- Académica do Mindelo, winner of the São Vicente Island League

=== Information about the clubs ===
Club	Location
Académica do Mindelo	Mindelo
Académica da Praia	Praia
Académico do Aeroporto	Espargos
Estrela dos Amadores	Tarrafal
Nô Pintcha	Furna
Onze Unidos	Vila do Maio
Paulense Desportivo Clube	Paúl
SC Sal Rei	Sal Rei
SC Santa Maria	Santa Maria
FC Ultramarina	Tarrafal de São Nicolau
Vulcânicos FC	São Filipe

== Overview ==
The league was contested with 12 clubs, Sal-Rei FC would win the championship.

== League standings ==
=== Group A ===
Pos	Team	Pld	W	D	L	GF	GA	GD	Pts
1	Académico do Aeroporto	5	3	2	0	14	3	+11	11
2	SC Sal Rei	5	3	2	0	12	2	+10	11
3	Académica do Mindelo	5	3	2	0	11	2	+9	11
4	CD Nô Pintcha	5	2	0	3	4	10	-6	6
5	Paulense Desportivo Clube	5	1	0	4	3	13	-10	3
6	Estrela dos Amadores	5	0	0	5	1	15	-14	0

=== Group B ===
Pos	Team	Pld	W	D	L	GF	GA	GD	Pts
1	FC Ultramarina	4	2	1	1	7	3	+4	7
2	Académica da Praia	4	2	1	1	9	6	+3	7
3	Onze Unidos	4	2	1	1	5	3	+2	7
4	Vulcânicos FC	4	1	2	1	7	8	-1	5
5	SC Santa Maria	4	0	1	3	3	11	-8	1

== Results ==
The league's highest scoring game would be Académico Aeroporto defeating Paulense 6-0.

Week 1
Home	Score	Visitor	Date
Sal Rei	4 - 0	Estrelas dos Amadores	8 May
Académica Mindelo	1 - 1	Académico Aeroporto	8 May
Nô Pintcha	1 - 0	Paulense	9 May
Onze Unidos	0 - 0	Ultramarina	8 May
Vulcânicos	3 - 3	Académica Praia	8 May

Week 2
Home	Score	Visitor	Date
Paulense	0 - 4	Académica Mindelo	15 May
Académico Aeroporto	2 - 2	Sal Rei	15 May
Estrelas dos Amadores	0 - 3	Nô Pintcha	16 May
Académica Praia	1 - 0	Onze Unidos	15 May
Santa Maria	1 - 1	Vulcânicos	16 May

Week 3
Home	Score	Visitor	Date
Paulense	3 - 0	Estrelas dos Amadores	22 May
Académica Mindelo	0 - 0	Sal Rei	22 May
Nô Pintcha	0 - 3	Académico Aeroporto	23 May
Santa Maria	0 - 4	Ultramarina	22 May
Vulcânicos	1 - 3	Onze Unidos	22 May

Week 4
Home	Score	Visitor	Date
Sal Rei	4 - 0	Nô Pintcha	29 May
Académico Aeroporto	6 - 0	Paulense	29 May
Estrelas dos Amadores	1 - 3	Académica Mindelo	30 May
Ultramarina	1 - 2	Vulcânicos	29 May
Académica Praia	4 - 1	Santa Maria	29 May

Week 5
Home	Score	Visitor	Date
Paulense	0 - 2	Sal Rei	5 June
Académica Mindelo	3 - 0	Nô Pintcha	5 June
Estrelas dos Amadores	0 - 2	Académico Aeroporto	5 June
Ultramarina	2 - 1	Académica Praia	5 June
Santa Maria	1 - 2	Onze Unidos	5 June

== Final Stages ==
Semi-Finals				Finals
Académica da Praia	2	2	4
Académico do Aeroporto	1	1	2	Académica da Praia	0	2	2
FC Ultramarina	2	1	3	SC Sal Rei	2	1	3
SC Sal-Rei	1	2	3

=== Semi-finals ===
12 June 2004

Académica da Praia	2:1	Académico do Aeroporto

Estádio da Várzea, Praia
12 June 2004

Sal-Rei FC	2:1	FC Ultramarina

Sal Rei
19 June 2004

Académico do Aeroporto	1:2	Académica da Praia

Estádio Marcelo Leitão, Espargos
19 June 2004

FC Ultramarina	2:1	Sal-Rei FC

Estádio João de Deus Lopes da Silva, Ribeira Brava

=== Finals ===
26 June 2004

Académica da Praia	0:2	Sal-Rei FC
		Kai 37'; Ravs 83'

Estádio da Várzea, Praia
10 July 2004

Sal-Rei FC	1:2	Académica da Praia
Ravs 68'		Décio 6'; Yuri 93'

Sal Rei

Cape Verdean Football 2004
Champions
Sport Sal Rei Club
1st title

== Statistics ==
- Top scorer: Ravs: 11 goals (Sal Rei FC)
- Biggest win: Académico Aeroporto 6-0 Paulense (May 29)
