= Sport in Cape Verde =

Cape Verde has risen to prominence in a number of sporting areas in recent decades.

== History ==
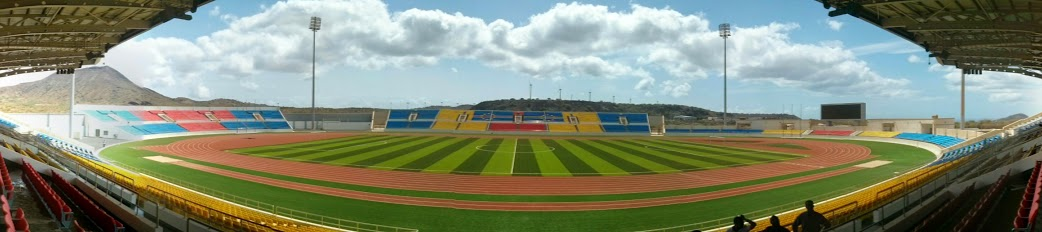
The national stadium

The first sport began in the island of São Vicente in the start of the 20th century, one of the first sports brought to the island was tennis and golf brought by the British and passengers visiting through Cape Verde. Later it spread to Santiago where the colonial capital was located and Sal.

Kite surfing, windsurfing has recently increased in use and popularity in Cape Verde today.

== Football ==
Football is the most popular sport in Cape Verde and has been for many years. Today it is one of the few countries that does not use the common division system (e.g. the Gambia, another small country uses the national division system and has the Premier and Second Divisions), another small country smaller in size is São Tomé and Príncipe who uses the same system as Cape Verde, but the system which Cape Verde used up to the 1990s having only a national championship match, the winner of each island competes in the national championships, sometimes when an island winner also won the championship as they won a national title in the previous season, a second place club competes, the national winner competes in the following season. The first edition was held in 1953 and was the Colonial Championships held up to 1974 as Cape Verde was under Portuguese rule. After Cape Verde became independent in 1975, it held its first edition in 1976, three championship competitions were cancelled, the first was difficulty of finding a winner from Sotavento, that year, other islands competed in the national championships. Mindelense also has the most national titles numbering 12.

The first regional championship was São Vicente, its first edition was held in 1938. Mindelense won the most titles numbering 48, the highest of any of the regional championships in the world. The Santiago Island League is the second oldest and since 2001 and formally since 2003, broken up into two zones. There are 11 championships in 9 islands, two are in the North and South Zones. Cape Verde has over 100 football clubs. Youth championships are held in most islands.

The nation also has the cup, the super cup and the opening tournament in each region, the Santiago North Zone does not have these competitions. The Cape Verdean Cup held its first edition in 2007, it was held four times up to 2012, afterwards it was cancelled. The winner of the cup from each island competed. Maio competed twice and Brava competed once. Santiago North never competed. There are 11 cup competitions, Santiago North does not have any, Santo Antão has both the North and South Zones and since 2016, the regional level.

The Cape Verdean Super Cup took place in 2013 with its first edition, the champion featured a cup winner, Sporting Praia win their only title, a year later the champion faced a super cup winner from the previous year, Mindelense won their only title in the recent edition in 2014.

The first club to compete at the African level was Sporting Praia in 1993, years after Cape Verde became a CAF member. A total of five clubs participated including Sporting Praia, Mindelense, FC Derby, Boavista Praia and Travadores, only one club SC Atlético was disqualified in 1992 due to that the football federation did not name the entrant on time.

Mindelense is the oldest football club in Cape Verde. It also has the westernmost club in the whole of Africa named Tarrafal de Monte Trigo, a lesser club and a newly established one who participated in the Santo Antão South Zone in the 2013-14 season.

The Opening Tournaments (Association Cup in some islands) has one part with a club meeting once, some has three or four rounds than a final match.

There are several venues for football, Estádio da Várzea in Praia, the capital is the most used, second is Mindelo's Estádio Municipal Adérito Sena is the second most used. Santiago has the most football venues. Boa Vista, Maio and Brava have only a venue each.

== Basketball ==
Basketball is the country's second most popular sport, popularity continues to grow today. Today it is one of the few countries that does not use the common division system, another small country smaller in size is São Tomé and Príncipe who uses the same system as Cape Verde, but the system which Cape Verde used up to the 1990s having only a national championship match, the winner of each island competes in the national championships, sometimes when an island winner also won the championship as they won a national title in the previous season, a second place club competes, the national winner competes in the following season.

The championship was first held after independence.

ADESBA is the only champion to compete at the continental level in 2015.

== Kite and wind surfing ==
Surfing is not done in Cape Verde. Other related sports such as kite and wind surfing are common in Cape Verde. It was introduced at the time of independence and was mainly dominant in the island of São Vicente. After the end of the 20th century, this type of sports was gaining in other islands notably Sal and Boa Vista which has a lot of sands and dunes with its desert-type landscape. Much of them were tourists. Its popularity was gaining in recent years in the two eastern islands mostly by tourists. It made Sal and Boa Vista the commonplace of kite and wind surfing in the country and does into the present day.

== Futsal ==
Futsal, a sport originated in Brazil has increasing in popularity in Cape Verde.

== Golf ==
A small golf course is located about 3 km south of Mindelo in the island of São Vicente and was the first of its kind in Cape Verde. More golf courses are planned especially in the Island of Sal and probably near Salamansa.

== Volleyball ==
Volleyball is another sport in Cape Verde.

Cape Verde featured a women's national team in beach volleyball that competed at the 2018–2020 CAVB Beach Volleyball Continental Cup.

== Other sports ==
Other sports played in the country are tennis and cricket. Tennis is gaining in popularity and players in recent years. The most notable complex in the country are in Praia's Várzea in the west and another in Mindelo. Badminton in Cape Verde is not common.

Cricket is another sport, one of the first sports brought to Cape Verde in the island of São Vicente. At the time, its popularity was mostly done by British visitors in the late 19th century and the 1900s at the height of ship service and refueling at Porto Grande Bay. Cricket remains popular today but not as much as that time, much of its dominance is in the island of São Vicente, a cricket club in existence today is GS Castilho.

== See also ==
Sports by island

- Sports in Sal, Cape Verde
- Sports in Santiago, Cape Verde
- Sports in Santo Antão, Cape Verde
- Sports in São Vicente, Cape Verde
