= Taça Dja d'Sal =

Sal Island SuperCup Taça Dja d'Sal
- Founded: 1999
- Region: Sal Island, Cape Verde
- Teams: 12
- Current champions: SC Santa Maria (1st time)
- Most championships: Académico do Aeroporto (4 or 5)

The Sal Island Cup (Portuguese: Taça da Ilha do Sal, Capeverdean Crioulo, Sal Creole: Taça Dja d' Sal, ALUPEC or ALUPEK: Tasa da Dja du Sal) is a cup competition played during the season in the island of Sal, Cape Verde, it consists of all the clubs from all the two regional divisions and are divided into about five to six rounds. The competition is organized by the Sal Regional Football Association (Associação Regional de Futebol de Sal, ARFS). The cup winner competed in the regional super cup final in the following season. For several seasons, the winner qualified into Cape Verdean Cup which has been cancelled due to financial and scheduling reasons.

Its recent cup winner is SC Santa Maria who won their only title.

== History ==
Académico do Aeroporto do Sal has won the most number of cup titles, the least are SC Santa Maria and SC Verdun.

Espargos has the most number of cup titles won numbering about 13. Santa Maria of the south of Sal is second with four and last is Pedra de Lume of the east of Sal.

Between 2012 and 2014, SC Santa Maria was the only club who never won a cup title, in 2015, it was one of five clubs who never won a title including ASGUI and Chã de Matias, up to 2018, it was one of nine who never won a cup title. After March 31, 2018, all of the original six has a cup title or more, leaving eight clubs who never won a cup title, six of the eight included ASGUI, Chã de Matias, Florença, JURF, Oásis Atlântico and Pretória.

In the 2017-18 season, its recent non competitor was ASGUI who withdrew.

== Winners ==
Season	Winner	Score	Runner-up
1999-2000	not listed		
2000/01	SC Verdun		
2001/02	Académico do Aeroporto		
2002/03	Académico do Aeroporto		
2003/04	not listed		
2004/05	Académica do Sal		
2005/06	Académico do Aeroporto		
2006/07	Académica do Sal		
2007/08	Académica do Sal	4–0	Juventude
2008/09	Académico do Aeroporto		
2009/10	Juventude		
2010-11	Académica do Sal		
2011-12	GD Palmeira		
2012/13	GD Palmeira	1–0	Académico do Aeroporto
2013/14	Juventude		
2014/15	GD Palmeira		
2015/16	Juventude		Académico do Aeroporto
2016-17	Académica do Sal	2–1	Académico do Aeroporto
2017–18	SC Santa Maria	1–0 (aet)	GD Palmeira

=== Performance By Club ===
Club	Winners	Winning years
Académico do Aeroporto	4/5	2002, 2003, 2006, 2009
Académica do Sal	5	2005, 2007, 2008, 2011, 2017
Juventude	3	2010, 2014, 2016
GD Palmeira	3	2012, 2013, 2015
SC Santa Maria	1	2018
SC Verdun	1	2001

=== Performance by area ===
Settlement or city	Area	Winning years
Espargos	11/12	2002, 2003, 2004, 2005, 2006, 2007, 2008, 2009, 2011, 2014, 2016, 2017
Pedra de Lume	1	2001
Santa Maria	4	2012, 2013, 2015, 2018

== See also ==
- Sal Island Super Cup
- Sal Island Opening Tournament
- Sal Island League
