= Sal Island Opening Tournament =

- Founded: around 2001 or 2002
- Region: Sal Island, Cape Verde
- Teams: 12 (6 in each two divisions)
- Current champions: SC Santa Maria (2nd time)
- Most championships: Académico do Aeroporto (9 titles)

The Sal Island Opening Tournament (Portuguese: Torneio de Abertura da Ilha do Sal, Capeverdean Crioulo, ALUPEC or ALUPEK: Turneiu de Abertura Idja du Sal) is an opening tournament competition played during the season in the island of Sal, Cape Verde. The competition is organized by the Sal Regional Football Association (Associação Regional de Futebol de Sal, ARFS). The competition is similar to a league cup used in other countries. The first competition began in the 2000s.

As the league later had two divisions, unlike other islands, the 2015 season had all of the clubs from the first and second divisions competed and extended to 11 rounds with several new clubs who started competing in official competitions. The group system was restored for the 2016-17 season and had two groups and each round, the leader of each group headed to the final and has two divisions.. The current winner is SC Santa Maria who became the fourth club to win their only title.

== Winners ==
Season	Winner	Score	Runner-up
2001/02	Académica do Sal		
2002-04	Unknown		
2004/05	Académico do Aeroporto		
2005/06	Académico do Aeroporto		
2006/07	Palmeira		
2007/08	Académica do Sal		
2008/09	Académico do Aeroporto		
2009/10	Académico do Aeroporto		
2010/11	Académico do Aeroporto		
2011/12	Académica do Sal		
2012/13	Académico do Aeroporto		
2013/14	Académico do Aeroporto		
2014/15	Académico do Aeroporto		
2015-16	Académico do Aeroporto		
2016/17	Santa Maria		
2017	Santa Maria	1–0	Académico do Aeroporto

=== Performance By Club ===
Listed titles only

Club	Winners	Winning years
Académico do Aeroporto	9	2005, 2006, 2009, 2010, 2011, 2013, 2014, 2015, 2016
Académica do Sal	2 listed	2002, 2008
SC Santa Maria	2	2016/17, 2017
GD Palmeira	1 listed	2007

=== Performance by area ===
Listed titles only

Settlement or city	Area	Winning years
Espargos	11 listed	2002, 2005, 2006, 2008, 2009, 2010, 2011, 2013, 2014, 2015, 2016
Santa Maria	3 listed	2007, 2016/17, 2017

== See also ==
- Sports in Sal, Cape Verde
- Sal Premier Division
- Sal Second Division
- Sal Island Cup
- Sal Island SuperCup
