= Cape Verdean Super Cup =

- Founded: 2013
- Region: Cape Verde
- Teams: 2
- Current champions: CS Mindelense
- 2014 Cape Verdean Super Cup

The Cape Verdean Super Cup (Portuguese: Super Taça de Cabo Verde, Capeverdean Crioulo, ALUPEC or ALUPEK: Super Tasa di Kauberdi) is a Super Cup competition played during the season in Cape Verde. The competition is governed by the Cape Verdean Football Federation (FCF). The national championship winner competes with the cup winner, in the 2014 edition, the 2013 super cup winner played with the 2014 national champion. The first super cup competition began in 2013 which took place on 1 May and the last one took place in 2014 which took place on 30 April. The regional champion competes with the cup champion. Sometimes, if a champion also has a cup title, a cup club who is runner-up qualifies which never did. since 2017, it is the only competition of any level where a cup-runner up never competed.

Planning for the Super Cup began at the start of 2010 and scheduling was completed in 2012.

Only three clubs participated, CD Onze Unidos, Sporting Praia and CS Mindelense. Sporting and Mindelense are the only Super Cup winners with each having a title. Sporting Praia was the only club who competed twice. The only super cup goal was scored in the 2014 edition.

Unlike other competitions, all of its super cup matches took place at Estádio 5 de Julho in São Filipe in the island of Fogo.

Since 2015, no super cup competition has taken place as no Cape Verdean Cup took place due to scheduling problems.

== Winners ==
Year	Winners	Score	Runners-up
2013	Sporting Clube da Praia	0–0 (5–3 p)	Onze Unidos
2014	CS Mindelense	1–0	Sporting Clube da Praia

== See also ==
- Cape Verdean Football Championships
- Cape Verdean Cup
