= 2023 Cape Verdean Football Championships =

Cape Verdean Football Championships
- Season: 2023
- Champions: GD Palmeira

The 2023 Cape Verdean Football Championships was a season of top-flight football in Cape Verde.

The championship final match between GD Palmeira and Académica do Mindelo was the second straight year both teams appeared in the final, and featured two teams from the island of Sal for only the third time ever. GD Palmeira won their first ever championship after defeating Académica 7:6 on penalties after playing to a 1–1 draw. Latche scored a free kick for Palmeiras in the 89th minute to send the match to penalty kicks. The final was played on the island of Maio.

The national stage of the competition featured a group stage followed by a semi-final. Mindelense qualified for the finals after only five matches out of group A. They were joined by the two finalists and Vulcânico from Group B, who were the best runners-up with 11 points.

Cape Verde did not send any teams to either of the 2023–24 African club cup competitions.

== League Table ==
=== Group A ===
Pos	Team	Pld	W	D	L	GF	GA	GD	Pts	Qualification or relegation
1	Mindelense	6	4	2	0	6	0	+6	14	Qualified for the semi-finals
2	Travadores	6	3	0	3	10	6	+4	9	
3	Santo Crucifixo	6	2	1	3	4	6	−2	7	
4	Juventude do Norte	6	1	1	4	4	12	−8	4	

Rules for classification: 1) points; 2) goal difference; 3) number of goals scored.

=== Group B ===
Pos	Team	Pld	W	D	L	GF	GA	GD	Pts	Qualification or relegation
1	GD Palmeira	6	4	0	2	10	6	+4	12	Qualified for the semi-finals
2	Vulcânico	6	3	2	1	8	5	+3	11	Qualified for the semi-finals
3	Belo Horizonte	6	1	2	3	5	10	−5	5	
4	Os Sanjoanenses	6	1	2	3	7	9	−2	5	

Rules for classification: 1) points; 2) goal difference; 3) number of goals scored.

=== Group C ===
Pos	Team	Pld	W	D	L	GF	GA	GD	Pts	Qualification or relegation
1	Académica do Mindelo	6	4	1	1	13	7	+6	13	Qualified for the semi-finals
2	Morabeza	6	2	4	0	6	4	+2	10	
3	Figueirense	6	1	2	3	8	11	−3	5	
4	Varandinha	6	0	3	3	6	11	−5	3	

Rules for classification: 1) points; 2) goal difference; 3) number of goals scored.

=== Semi-final stage ===
- Palmeira 4–3 Mindelense (2:2, 2:1)
- Académica do Mindelo 8–5 Vulcânico (2:2, 6:3)

Soccerway

=== Final ===
8 July 2023
Final

Académica do Mindelo	1–1	GD Palmeira
'48 Aí		'89 Latche
Penalties
	6–7

Dau d'Segunda, Ilha do Maio

== Attendances ==
The average league attendance was 388:

#	Club	Average
1	Mindelense	781
2	Travadores	713
3	Académica do Mindelo	624
4	Vulcânico	411
5	Juventude do Norte	332
6	Palmeira	322
7	Os Sanjoanenses	268
8	Santo Crucifixo	263
9	Morabeza	260
10	Figueirense	244
11	Belo Horizonte	238
12	Varandinha	200
