= Sports in São Vicente, Cape Verde =

The island of São Vicente in Cape Verde in the westcentral portion of the Barlavento Islands is home to several teams and clubs. The major professional clubs are CS Mindelense, FC Derby, Académica do Mindelo, Batuque FC and Amarante. The island also has a league named the São Vicente Island League, it is the oldest in Cape Verde, first it only had football, later it had basketball, volleyball, athletics and now futsal.

The island was the first place in Cape Verde that sports were introduced.

== Football (soccer) ==
Football remains to be the most popular sport both in the island and the nation, the championship are includes the nearby islets that include Santa Luzia, it is the only championship including the two main islands. The island has 14 football clubs, 8 in the Premier Division and 6 in the Second Division. There are two professional clubs, two amateur semi-pro clubs.

The oldest football and sports club on the island as well as Cape Verde is CS Mindelense which was founded in 1919 and was officially founded on May 25. 1922. GS Castilho was the second oldest club founded on February 18, 1922, and later FC Derby, the third oldest club founded on August 5, 1929, and the first club that is an affiliate of a POrtuguese club, the fourth oldest is GD Amarantes. Between December 2, 1929, to 1931, it had the most clubs in Cape Verde. The São Vicente Island League was formed and had four clubs for the first three seasons. Académica do Mindelo was founded on April 1, 1940, the first Portuguese based club on the island, it increased to six matches with the semi-finals introduced and the winner would be decided on the number of points. Falcões do Norte was later founded. Until 1953, it was the only championship in Cape Verde and they were unofficial. More clubs were founded in the 1980s including Batuque and Corinthians São Vicente, the only affiliate of a Brazilian club in the nation, Ribeira Bote and Farense were later founded, in 2007, the first clubs outside of Mindelo competed including São Pedro, Salamansa and Calhau, Farense was later founded. Since its foundation of the championships, Mindelense has been the most successful club on the island and a club that won the most regional titles in the world numbering 48, second is Derby and has won 10 titles with their last in 2014. Mindelense today are the top 5 clubs in Cape Verde, the most popular are Boavista and Sporting Clube da Praia of the Santiago South Zone.

The island league's clubs are Académica Mindelo, Amarante, Batuque, Calhau, Castilho, Corinthians São Vicente, Derby, Falcões do Norte, Farense Mindelense, Ponta d'Pom, Ribeira Bote, Salamansa and São Pedro.

Only three clubs are outside the city of Mindelo.

From 1953 to independence, the winner competed in a colonial championship final which was a club from Santiago. After independence, the club elevated into the national semi-finals and a club could compete from another island, Mindelense would first challenge a club from Mindelo. From the 1990s, the point system was introduced and the club with the most points and goals competed into the knockout stage, in 2001 and 2002, the winner was decided on the number of points.

Two clubs, Mindelense and Derby have competed in the continental competitions.

Also there are regional cup competitions, super cup competitions in which features a champion and a cup winner (sometimes a second place cup winner when a champion is also a cup winner) and an opening tournament. The cup and the opening tournament (from 2007, the association cup) were founded in 1999, the super cup were founded in 2000.

The island also features some city football (soccer) tournaments including the Mindelo Cup held for some years, the last was in 2016 which featured the regional champion and the regional cup winner, it was the first to have two clubs from outside the island, they were Académica do Porto Novo and Paulense from the neighboring island of Santo Antão

== Basketball ==
Basketball is the second most popular sport on the island. Its most popular clubs are Académica do Mindelo, GS Castilho and probably Amarante. The champion competes in the national basketball championships each season.

== Tennis and Badminton ==
Tennis and badminton has recently increased in popularity in Cape Verde along with the island. The main tennis complexes are in Mindelo Sports Complex which includes Estádio Municipal Adérito Sena.

== Golf ==
It was the first island in Cape Verde that brought golf, it was introduced at the start of the 20th century during the colonial times. Cape Verde's first golf course is located around 3 km south of the city center of Mindelo.

== Other sports ==
Volleyball, futsal, beach volleyball and athletics are other sports on the island. Athletics are competed at the Estádio Municipal Adérito Sena, the only on the island. One of the athletic clubs is Castilho.

== Sporting events ==
Numerous National Championship finals took place several times at Estádio Municipal Adérito Sena, from its early years in the 1930s up to 1992 it was called Estádio da Fontinha. Some Colonial Championships was held at the stadium between 1953 and 1975. Since the number of final matches was doubled in 2000, each match took place at Adérito Sena in 2000, 2005, 2008, 2011 and from 2013 to 2016.

== Stadium and arenas ==
| Stadium | Town / City | Capacity | Type | Tenants | Opened |
|---|---|---|---|---|---|
| Estádio Municipal Adérito Sena | Mindelo | 5,000 | Football; Athletics | Académica Mindelo, Amarante, Castilho, Corinthians São Vicente, Derby, Farense, Mindelense, Ribeira Bote | 1938 |
| Estádio Adilson Nascimento | Mindelo | 1,000 | Football; Athletics | Secondary use | |

=== Smaller football (soccer) fields ===
- Campo de Bela Vista - artificial turf - located in Bela Vista in the east of Mindelo
- Campo de Calhau - dirt field - used for training by Calhau FC
- Campo de São Pedro - dirt field - used for training by AD São Pedro
- Campo da Salamansa - dirt field - used for training by Salamansa FC and its their home field
- Campo de Ribeira Julião - artificial turf

== See also ==
- Sport in Cape Verde
- Arts and culture in São Vicente, Cape Verde

Sport in other islands

- Sport in Fogo, Cape Verde
- Sport in Sal, Cape Verde
- Sport in Santiago, Cape Verde
- Sport in Santo Antão, Cape Verde
