= Estádio Marcelo Leitão =

Sports stadium in Sal Island, Cape Verde

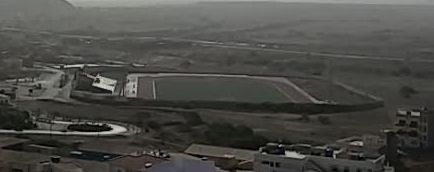
- Estádio Marcelo Leitão from Monte Curral

- Location within Cape Verde
- Location: Espargos on Sal Island, Cape Verde
- Coordinates: 16.7533°N 22.9388°W
- Owner: Municipality of Sal
- Operator: Sal Regional Football Association (ARFS); Sal Regional Athletics Association (ARAS)
- Capacity: 2,000

Construction
- Opened: 1980s

Tenants
- Football clubs: Académico do Aeroporto; Académica do Sal; Juventude; Verdun; Gaviões; Chã de Matias; Jovens Unidos; GDRC Pretória; All clubs from other parts of Sal

Estádio Marcelo Leitão is a multi-use stadium in Sal Island, Cape Verde. It is used mostly for football matches and now track and field and has a capacity of 8,000 people. It is named for Marcelo Leitão, one of the two main features on the island, the other is a square located in Santa Maria. The stadium is owned by the municipality of Sal and still does as the municipality has yet to split into two. The stadium are operated by the Sal Regional Football (Soccer) and Athletic associations. It is the home stadium of Espargos teams, Académico do Aeroporto and others based in a neighborhood Juventude and recently Chã de Matias, Gaviões, Jovens Unidos of Ribeira Funda (the three since 2014) and Pretória (since 2017), it is also home to the island's club Académica do Sal. The ground is made of artificial grass, its area is 105 x 68 meters. Its location is south of the road connecting the east of the city with the road encircling most of the city. The stadium also had recently constructed parking lots.

Its location is over 1 km east of the city center. Nearby areas includes the urban area to the north which continues to expand, the Espargos-Pedra de Lume road (EN2-SL01) in the south and the University of Sal and the hill in the west.

== Football ==
Despite that Estádio Municipal de Santa Maria expanded in around 2012 or 2014, clubs based in Santa Maria, SC Santa Maria and GD Palmeira continues to play at the stadium in Espargos in the middle of the island.

== Athletics ==
Since 2010, athletics are played at the stadium and is the only one on the island. The Sal Regional Athletics Championships takes places each season. All clubs on the island compete at the facility surrounding the football field.

== History ==
=== Early football field ===
Espargos opened the island's second football field in the 1960s and the clubs played at that field. The stadium was completed in the 1980s. A huge growing population throughout Sal including the capital led to the construction of a newer stadium in the eastern limits of Morro Curral in 2001 and the newer started expanded on March 10, 2003. In early November 2005, the stadium became the second on the island to have an artificial turf. The stadium became illuminated in 2008. A track and field was completed on April 5, 2010.

=== Football field in Chã de Matias ===
ENE of Espargos and north of the subdivision of Pretoria, is another small football field named Patina used for youth competitions, it was built in the late 2000s and demolished in 2015. After its demolished, it was improved and added a new football field with seats and was opened in 2016. Second Division matches of the island may recently have started playing at the field.

=== Modern stadium ===
Two finals were held in the stadium, the first was the second match of the 2003 Cape Verdean Football Championships where Acadèmico do Aeroporto do Sal won their only title after winning over FC Ultramarina 3–2, all goals were scored by Dixa. The most recent was the 2006 Cape Verdean Football Championships where Académico of Sal Airport lost to Sporting Clube da Praia 0–1 in its first match, in the following week, Académico of Sal Airport lost the championships and Sporting Praia won their fifth title.

The 2009 Cape Verdean Cup had Group B teams played in the stadium, clubs based in the east of the archipelago. The 2012 edition of the cup had the group stage matches and the cup final played at the stadium.

== See also ==
- List of buildings and structures in Sal, Cape Verde
- List of football stadiums in Cape Verde
