= Rodi Duarte =

Cape Verdean footballer (born 1991)

Rodi
Personal information
- Full name: Rodirlei José Ascensão Duarte
- Date of birth: 28 May 1991 (age 35)
- Place of birth: Santa Maria, Cape Verde
- Height: 1.70 m (5 ft 7 in)
- Position: Forward

Team information
- Current team: Sporting Praia

Youth career
- 2009: Porto

Senior career*
Years	Team	Apps	(Gls)
?–2009	Sporting Santa Maria		
2009–2010	Porto	0	(0)
2010–2012	Gil Vicente	0	(0)
2011–2012	→ Pinhalnovense (loan)	8	(2)
2012–2014	Famalicão	14	(2)
2014–2015	Poli Timișoara	9	(1)
2015–2016	Sporting Praia		
2016–2017	Santa Maria		
2017–2020	GD Oásis Atlântico		
2020–2021	Florença Santa Maria		
Total		31	(5)

International career
- Cape Verde U21
2009	Cape Verde	2	(2)
- * Club domestic league appearances and goals

Rodirlei "Rodi" José Ascensão Duarte, sometime known as "Rody" (born 28 May 1991) is a Cape Verdean former footballer who played as a forward.

== Career ==
Rodi spend his youth career in Portugal where he played for F.C. Porto. He returned to Cape Verde and his senior career began with SC Santa Maria based in his hometown. He would play for several Portuguese football clubs starting with FC Porto for one season in 2009, two seasons with Gil Vicente and was on loan with Pinhalnovense in the 2011–12 season and recently with Famalicão. He spent one season in Romania with ACS Poli Timişoara where he appeared for nine matches and scored a goal. Rodi moved to play with Sporting Praia, his second Cape Verdean club in six years where he currently appears.

Rodi was capped for Cape Verde under-21 team. He was call-up to the senior team in September 2009 along with three other U21 internationals and played in the match against Malta.
