= Sal Premier Division =

- Founded: 1960
- Region: Sal Island, Cape Verde
- Number of clubs: 8
- Promotion to: Cape Verdean Football Championship
- Relegation to: Sal Second Division
- Domestic cup(s): Sal Island Cup; Sal Island SuperCup
- Current champions: Palmeira (7th title) (2024–25)
- Most championships: Académico do Aeroporto (15 titles)
- Broadcaster(s): TCV (major pro clubs)
- Website: Official website

The Sal Premier Division is a regional championship played in Sal Island, Cape Verde. The winner of the championship plays in Cape Verdean football Championships of each season. The competition are organized by the Sal Regional Football Association (Associação Regional de Futebol de Sal, ARFS). The Premier Divisions contains eight clubs. In title history, Académico do Aeroporto has the most titles numbering 14, and is ranked fifth in the most championship titles of any of the island leagues in Cape Verde. The champion promotes into the Cape Verdean Football Championships each season while the last placed club relegates into the second division the following season.

== History ==
The regional championships was founded shortly after independence and became the four championships to compete at the national level.

SC Verdun from Santa Maria was the first club to win a title, Académico Sal, Palmeira and Académica do Aeroporto were the next club to win a title, SC Santa Maria was the fifth club to win a title in 1987. From 1990 to 2014, it was the only regional championship in Cape Verde that every club has won a title, Juventude was the last club who was without a title in 1990.

Up to the 2014 season, the league had only six clubs competing. From the mid-2000s to 2011, it had the second most clubs in the country, up until 2014, it had the fewest clubs in the country after Maio and Brava. When the Second Division was introduced, the championships has the fifth most clubs in the nation after São Vicente.

Sal was the most recent club to have a Second Division added in the 2014/15 season, each two divisions had 6 clubs each. In the following season, two clubs added to the premier division totalling eight.

== Broadcasting rights ==
Its top clubs, the Académica clubs of the island are broadcast on TCV but not often except for a club competing at the national level, it is aired often on its Sal affiliate.

== Sal Premier Division - Clubs 2017/18 ==
- Académico do Aeroporto - Espargos
- Académica do Sal - Espargos
- ASGUI - Santa Maria
- Florença - Santa Maria
- Gaviões - Hortelã, Espargos - relegated after finishing last
- Juventude - Morro Curral, Espargos
- Palmeira - champions
- Santa Maria

== Winners ==
=== Sal Island/Regional Championships ===
- 1960: Atlético
- 1961–69: not known
- 1970–75: not held
- 1975–76: Juventude
- 1976–77: Juventude
- 1977–78: Not held
- 1978–79: Juventude
- 1979–80: Verdun
- 1980–81: Santa Maria
- 1981–82: Académica
- 1982–83: Santa Maria
- 1983–84: Académica
- 1984–85: Palmeira
- 1985–86: Santa Maria
- 1986–87: Académico do Aeroporto
- 1987–88: Santa Maria
- 1988–89: Juventude
- 1989–90: Juventude
- 1990–91: Académica
- 1991–92: Académica
- 1992–93: Académica
- 1993–94: Académica
- 1994–95: Académico do Aeroporto
- 1995–96: Académica
- 1996–97: Santa Maria
- 1997–98: Santa Maria
- 1998–99: Juventude
- 1999–00: Palmeira
- 2000–01: Académica
- 2001–02: Académico do Aeroporto
- 2002–03: Académico do Aeroporto
- 2003–04: Académico do Aeroporto
- 2004–05: Académica
- 2005–06: Académico do Aeroporto
- 2006–07: Académico do Aeroporto
- 2007–08: Académico do Aeroporto
- 2008–09: Santa Maria
- 2009–10: Académico do Aeroporto
- 2010–11: Académico do Aeroporto
- 2011–12: Juventude
- 2012–13: Académico do Aeroporto
- 2013–14 : Verdun

=== Sal Premier Division ===
- 2014–15: Académico do Aeroporto
- 2015–16: Académico do Aeroporto
- 2016–17: Académico do Aeroporto
- 2017–18: Palmeira
- 2018–19: Oásis Atlântico
- 2019–20: Palmeira
- 2020–21: abandoned due to COVID-19 pandemic
- 2021–22: Palmeira
- 2022–23: Palmeira
- 2023–24: Académico do Aeroporto
- 2024–25: Palmeira

=== Performance By Club ===
Club	Winners	Winning years
Académico do Aeroporto	15	1987, 1995, 2002, 2003, 2004, 2006, 2007, 2008, 2010, 2011, 2013, 2015, 2016, 2017, 2024
Académica	10	1960, 1982, 1984, 1991, 1992, 1993, 1994, 1996, 2001, 2005
Palmeira	7	1985, 2000, 2018, 2020, 2022, 2023, 2025
Juventude	7	1976, 1977, 1979, 1989, 1990, 1999, 2012
Santa Maria	7	1981, 1983, 1986, 1988, 1997, 1998, 2009
Verdun	2	1980, 2014
Oásis Atlântico	1	2019

=== Performance by area ===
Settlement or town	Winners	Winning years
Espargos	32	1960, 1976, 1977, 1979, 1982, 1984, 1987, 1989, 1990, 1991, 1992, 1993, 1994, 1995, 1996, 1999, 2001, 2002, 2003, 2004, 2005, 2006, 2007, 2008, 2010, 2011, 2012, 2013, 2015, 2016, 2017, 2024
Santa Maria	15	1981, 1983, 1985, 1986, 1988, 1997, 1998, 2000, 2009, 2018, 2019, 2020, 2022, 2023, 2025
Pedra de Lume	2	1980, 2014

== Other sporting clubs ==
=== Basketball ===
The island also has its basketball competition. The competition is run by the Sal Basketball Association (ARBS, Associação de Basquetebol (or Basquete) do Sal). All of its games are played at Polidesportivo Municipal do Sal. One of its clubs include:

- Académico do Aeroporto
- GDRC Pretória

== See also ==
- Sal Regional Football Association
- Sports in Sal, Cape Verde
