= Académica do Sal =

Académica
- Full name: Associação Académica do Sal
- Nickname(s): Atlético
- Founded: August 3, 1963
- Ground: Estadio Marcelo Leitão; Espargos, Cape Verde
- Capacity: 8,000
- League: Sal Island League
- 2015–16: 2nd
Home colours	Away colours

Associação Académica do Sal (Capeverdean Crioulo, also in the Sal Crioulo language, ALUPEC or ALUPEK, Akadémika) is a football club that had played in the Premier division and plays in the Sal Island League in Cape Verde. It is based in the city of Espargos in the island of Sal and its location is on Palmeira Road (Caminho da Palmeira) next to the city library. It is one of many teams that only won one title since independence. Its current proprietor is Mário Ramos.

It is played along with Sal's famous teams including Académico do Aeroporto.

Académica Sal is one of the most successful football (soccer) club in Cape Verde, having won about 17 official titles, only one is national and the remaining 16 are regional titles.

== Logo and uniform ==
Home uniform up to 2015

The logo and the uniform as well as other teams with the name Académica and Académico in Cape Verde is identical to Académica de Coimbra.

Its current uniform feature a blue-yellow striped T-shirt with yellow in its edges and blue sleeves along with blue shorts and socks used during home matches and the uniform used during away matches remains white.

Its former uniform colours were black for home matches and white for away matches.

== History ==
The club was founded on August 3, 1963 in Espargos (then a newly founded town) and is also the second oldest club in Espargos. The club serves the whole island. Three years later, another club affiliate to Académica would be founded in Sal and is Académico do Aeroporto do Sal and serves Espargos, Palmeira, Pedra de Lume and Terra Boa.

At the regional competitions, the club has won about 6 championship titles, 5 opening tournament titles and four cup titles.

The club celebrated its 25th anniversary in 1988.

In 2013, the club celebrated its 50th anniversary. In recent years, Académica do Sal was runner up in the 2013–14 season with 19 points and 6 wins. A year later, the club suffered which ended up at last place and finished with 2 points and had no wins, this was the last time that a club finished last and remains in the championships. Académica Sal did better in the four match extended season with two new clubs added, Académica Sal saw their next win in 11 matches defeating Palmeira 2–1 on February 6. On March 5, the club challenged Florença for the first time and defeated that club based in Santa Maria. On March 17, the club met for the first time with ASGUI and defeated that newly entered club 0–1. Académica Sal was once more a runner up in the 2015–16 season with 27 points and scored 24 goals. Académica Sal started off first place for the 2016–17 season, then 5th at the fourth round and from the sixth round onwards 4th place, but not in round 7 where they were 3rd, there they lost their chance from ever returning to be first, Académica Sal finished with 22 points and scored four goals and draws. Their last season match was an 0–2 win over Palmeira, there it was the last two goals the club scored for 2017 at the Premier Division. In the cup competition, once again, Académica Sal reached the final which will take place on May 6 and will feature Académico do Aeroporto do Sal and bringing again the Airport Derby there. As Académico do Aeroporto also won the 2017 regional championships on April 13, Académica Sal got their qualification into the 2017 regional super cup. Académica do Sal defeated Académico do Aeroporto and claimed their next cup title in six years for the island, their super cup qualification became as cup winner.

Académica Sal appeared in the 2017–18 regional cup in the first round on November 18, the match with Gaviões ended in a scoreless draw which brought into the penalty shootout, unlike their successful previous season, Académica Sal lost 9–8 in penalty kicks and was thrown out from further competitions. Académica Sal started the 2017–18 season not well with two scoreless draws, then two straight wins and was sixth, a position that was throughout the 2014–15 season up to the fifth round, this time not a single goal scored, the least in the region, less than the newest entrants of Florença Santa Maria, Gaviões and ASGUI. Académica Sal is now suffering as they are now in their worst position ever, they are now seventh but not in the relegation zone. They kept their promise of staying in the Premier Division for the following season as ASGUI only had losses, they remain seventh. Académica lost to Florença 2–1 on January 21 and finally scored their next Premier Division goal in nine months. Académica made a goal draw with Juventude and the club and has three points with 3 draws and four losses, the club conceded 11 goals, the third worst alongside Florença. Académica suffered two more losses, the first in the Airport Derby featuring Académico do Aeroporto before another single goal draw was made, this time with Santa Maria. The club was first seventh, then it risen to sixth and stayed outside the last two positions even into the 11th round. Recently they made a goal draw with Santa Maria on March 3, in goal totals, the least in Sal with six, one less than last placed Gaviões. The lowest position the club once finished, the Airport Derby took place at the 12th round occurred, they lost 2–1 to Académico do Aeroporto and lost a position to seventh, the club scored its seventh seasonal goal the least in the Premier Division. On March 13, they unexpectedly lost to Florença Sta. Maria and the club scored nothing. Gaviões's loss kept Académica Sal most of its chances not being relegated. Uncertainty the club may relegate or remain next season.

=== National participation ===
Académica challenged against FC Derby in the 1984 finals and lost to Derby 3–2 on penalties, they would win their first and only national title in 1993 after beating Boavista from Praia, they were tied 2 in the first match, they won 2–1 over Boavista, it is the only club from the island to win a national title. After winning Sal's title for 1996, the club headed for their stint for another national title, they entered what was the triangular phase which featured Santiago's CD Travadores and São Nicolau's FC Ultramarina from Tarrafal, their attempt failed as they finished third place behind Ultramarina and the club which Académica do Sal lost the title to, Travadores.

One of the club's recent national appearance were in 2001 and in 2005, the first finished with 13 points and had 4 wins, in point totals, it was shared with GD Amarantes which was second at the time. Their next was in 2005 and had the same number of wins, goals and points as they did four years earlier, but was slightly more successful with no loss and only four goals conceded, the club headed to the semis and lost to FC Derby 4–1 in the first match, the second match was scoreless and the club was out of the competition.

=== Continental competition ===
After their 1993 win, they participated in the 1994 African Cup of Champions Clubs (now the Champions League) and faced Mauritania's Sonader and lost to that club. It is the only appearance of a club outside the islands of Santiago and São Vicente at a continental level, it does not include SC Atlético in 1992 as the club was disqualified as the federation did not name the entrant on time.

Académica Sal never scored a goal in the two matches against SONADER (or SONADER Ksar) which is now simply known as Ksar of Mauritania, the club lost 2–0 in one of two matches in Nouakchott Stadium. It is one of two Cape Verdean clubs that never scored a goal at a continental level.

=== Other competitions ===
Académica Sal's first opening tournament title was won in 2002, their next was in 2008 and their recent was in 2016.

Académica's first cup title was win in around 2005, their second was in 2007, their third was in 2008 and their recent was in 2011.

Académica do Sal was Sal's first cup winner to appear in the first Cape Verdean Cup in the summer of 2007 and did not appear in the finals. They were one of four teams that participated in the national level.

== Stadium ==
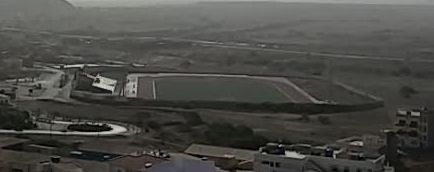
Estádio Marcelo Leitão, the home field of Académica do Sal

Estádio Marcelo Leitão is a multi-use stadium in Espargos, Cape Verde. It is currently used mostly for football matches. The stadium holds 8,000. The stadium has seat rows in the east side and is east-southeast of the city center and Monte Curral. The stadium is home to the two best football clubs on the island, the other being Académico do Aeroporto, other clubs based in Espargos includes Juventude which is based in Morro Curral and the stadium is being located inside the neighborhood. Other clubs based in Espargos but a neighborhood includes the newly established clubs of Gaviões and Chã de Matias. Clubs playing the stadium but based on other parts of the island include Santa Maria, SC Verdun Pedra de Lume, Palmeira de Santa Maria and ASGUI, Florença.

== Rivalry ==
Académico do Aeroporto do Sal is the club's only rival and is called the Airport Derby (Clássico da Ilha do Aeroprto, Derby of the Island of the Airport), where Espargos was founded upon, sometimes, it is known as the Derby of the Académicas of Sal or the Sal Island Derby, the only derby on the island.

== Honours ==
- Cape Verdean Championship: 1

1992/93

- Sal Island League: 6 listed

1983/84, 1992/93, 1993/94, 1995/96, 2000/01, 2004/05

- Sal Island Opening Tournament: 5

2001/02, 2007/08, 2011/12, 2013/14, 2015/16

- Sal Island Cup: 5

2004 or 2005?, 2007, 2008, 2011, 2017

== Performance in CAF competitions ==
Académica do Sal's results in CAF competition
Season	Competition	Qualification method	Round	Opposition	Home	Away	Aggregate
1994	African Cup of Champions Clubs	Cape Verdean champions	Preliminary Round	(Mauritania) SONADER Ksar	0–0	2–0	2–0

== League and cup history ==
=== National championship ===
Season	Div.	Pos.	Pl.	W	D	L	GS	GA	GD	P	Notes	Playoffs
2001	1	2	6	4	1	1	10	5	+5	13		
2005	1B	1	5	4	1	0	10	4	+6	13	Promoted into playoffs	4th place

=== Island/Regional Championship ===
Season	Div.	Pos.	Pl.	W	D	L	GS	GA	GD	P	Cup	Notes
2004–05	2	1	-	-	-	-	-	-	-	-	Winner	Promoted into the National Championships
2013–14	2	5	10	6	1	3	18	8	+10	19		Promoted into the National Championships
2014–15	2	6	10	0	2	8	5	29	-24	2		
2015–16	2	2	14	9	0	5	24	19	+5	27	Finalist	
2016–17	2	4	14	6	4	4	18	17	+1	22	Winner	
2017–18	2	6	14	2	4	8	9	24	-15	10	1st round	

=== Association cup ===
Season	Group	Pos.	Pl.	W	D	L	GS	GA	GD	P	Finals
2017	B	4	3	0	1	2	2	6	-4	1	Did not appear

== Statistics ==
- Best position: 1st (national)
- Best position at a cup competition: 1st (regional)
- Best position at an opening tournament: 1st
- Appearances in a cup competition:
  - National: 1
  - Regional: 18
- Highest number of points in a season: 13 (national)
- Worst position: 6th (regional)
- Worst season: 2018

== Managers ==
- (Cape Verde) Lúcio Antunes, in around 2009–2010

== Other sports ==
Handball is Académica do Sal other sports club.
