= Académico do Aeroporto =

- Full name: Académico do Aeroporto do Sal
- Nicknames: Cadems, Controladores (Controllers)
- Founded: 1 December 1966
- Ground: Estádio Marcelo Leitão; Espargos, Sal, Cape Verde
- Capacity: 8,000
- Chairman: (Cape Verde) Carlos Moniz
- Manager: (Cape Verde) Nelito
- League: Sal Island League
- 2016–17: 1st, Champion
- Website: http://www.academicosal.com
Home colours	Away colours

Académico do Aeroporto (Capeverdean Crioulo, ALUPEC or ALUPEK: Akadémiku du Aeropurtu) is a football club that had played in the Premier division and plays in the Sal Island League in Cape Verde. It is based in the city of Espargos in the island of Sal. The team is named after its nearby airport (Sal International Airport). Its current director is Ivan Lopes since mid-February 2017, its chairman is Carlos Moniz who returned for the second time and its manager was Lúcio Antunes since 2015. Now that Verdun Pedra de Lume was relegated, the club became the island's five unrelegated original clubs.

Académico do Aeroporto is one of the most successful football (soccer) club in Cape Verde and is the most successful on the island, having won about 32 official titles, only one is national and the remaining 31 are regional titles.

== History ==
The club was founded on 1 December 1966 and are one of two affiliates with Académica de Coimbra, the other is Académica do Sal. One of some in the nation having two affiliates in a championship, the other for example is CD Travadores and Benfica on Praia that are affiliated with S.L. Benfica. It is also the third oldest club in the city of Espargos.

The club won their first ever regional title in 1986, as the national competition was cancelled, they never appeared. They won their second title in 1988 and qualified into the nationals for the first time.

Between 1992 and 1993 with Juventude and Palmeira, then again in 2003 and 2004 and 2004 and 2005, the team had the same title with Associação Académica do Sal. Since 2003, the club won the most titles on the island with 14 titles and is fifth of any of the island leagues with the most championship titles. Also the club won 4 cup titles, their recent was in 2009. The club also has 5 super cup titles, their first was in 2008, their next two was won every two years, in 2011 and in 2013.

Académico do Aeroporto brought a new manager named Lúcio Antunes who was coaching the Angolan team Progresso Associação do Sambizanga, he coached for a season His management brought Académico to win their second regional consecutive title on 21 April 2016, their fourth time from 2002 to do so and now totals 14, the club finished with a new record of 35 points led by an additional two clubs and four matches in the season. The club's last seasonal match was a 5-1 win over Santa Maria, one of the season's highest and Académico's last win over that club. In other competitions was the regional cup, where the only failure the club did was a loss at the cup final to Juventude in May. Qualified as champions, Académico entered the 2016 Super Cup and defeated Juventude to win their recent title. Académico appeared in the 2016 championships in mid-May and was placed in Group B, the club finished with 7 points and had two wins and scored four goals, this was the third season that they finished third. Antunes was to return to coach the Cape Verdean team but he declined it, he continues to coach Académico do Aeroporto do Sal. In November, Cabeto left and Moniz was once again as president.

The club celebrated the 50th year of foundation on 1 December 2016.

Académico do Aeroporto do Sal started off the 2017 Premier Division season third, then second at the 3rd round, the club was fourth at rounds 2 to 4. Ivan Lopes replaced Mendes as director of the club in mid February. The club remained second until 14 April when they took the first-place position. The club had a two-point difference with Santa Maria two weeks before the end of the regional season. Académico do Aeroporto won the final match of the season and threw out Pedra de Lume (Verdun) out of the Premier Division for the following season, the result was 1-0 and claimed their third consecutive title, 15th overall. In goalscoring, this is the number with 29, one less than Juventude's. Académico do Aeroporto once again headed to the cup final for 2017 and faced Académica do Sal in the Airport Island Derby, another consecutive cup final loss was made and lost the title to that club.

Académico do Aeroporto appeared in the 2017 regional super cup, qualified as champion, they faced the cup winner Académica do Sal and the Airport Island Derby was featured in the Super Cup held on 14 October, the club won their 6th title after a tough match which defeated 4-2 in the penalty shootout as the match ended in a goal draw. Académico had two straight wins defeating clubs not powerful on the island, at the third round on 17 December, they played with Santa Maria, they made another loss to the island's oldest club and the score was 1-2 at the third round, they were fourth place at the fourth round after a goal draw with Juventude. On 14 January, the club defeated Académica do Sal in the island's only rivalry, the Airport Rivalry and put that club in their worst scenario as they were seventh and had no goals scored, that club was seventh. Académico was still fourth with 13 points, their match, a 1-3 win over Gaviões. Académico defeated ASGUI on 10 February then suffered a loss to Florença Santa Maria next round. Académico do Aeroporto is still fourth. A win over Santa Maria followed, then a goal draw with Juventude Sal, the Airport Derby came and a 2-1 win over Académica Sal and is not the last match of the derby as that club is seventh outside the relegation zone. Académico saw the unexpected, a loss to Palmeira, with it, a chance for their fourth consecutive title and national participation as they have 23 points. Gaviões will be the season's final challenge in Sal and likely to kick that club into the Second Division next season.

=== Opening Tournament successes ===
Their first opening tournament title was won in 2005, their second which made it two in a row in 2006, in 2011, the club won three titles in a row, recently the club won one opening tournament title every two years for four years between their third in a row and 2015, their recent win was the 2015 season. Together with Juventude and Palmeira Santa Maria they have 10 points, 3 wins and a draw. Académico has 9 goals and makes it third with three less than Juventude.

Académico do Aeroporto's recent opening tournament final appearance was the 2017 season, they lost the title to SC Santa Maria.

=== National appearances ===
Their first national participation was in 1988, they lost one of the matches and was a non-participant in the finals. In 1995 they finished 2nd place in Group C with two points, the first with a point system and the only with the old two point system, the club failed to advance into the final stage.

In the 2002 national championship season, their first match was a loss to Batuque of São Vicente and was last place, next was three consecutive wins as they defeat São Nicolau's Atlético, Académica do Fogo and Santo Antão's Sanjoanense, they were second place. A single goal draw with Maio's Onze Unidos was next, it put the club first place. Next was a loss to almighty Sporting Praia before their bye week, their position fallen to fourth. Their final match of the season was a win over the ailing Académica da Brava. Along with Académica do Fogo and SC Atlético, the club had 16 points and was third, the points was second ranked. From the reintroduction of the group stage in 2003 up until the stage changed in 2016, not a single club would have 16 points. As the national championships became three groups and each club has a six match regular season, still not a single club has over 16 points today.. Académico do Aeroporto finished fourth, shared with SC Atletico and Académico do Aeroporto, they also had 5 wins and a draw, the difference was the club scored 19 goals, less than Académica do Fogo's 21 and more than and Atlético's 17.

In the 2006 season, Académico do Aeroporto do Sal had four wins and finished first with 12 points and 12 goals scored, as they shared the same points with Sporting Praia, the club had four goals more. Overall, Mendes scored the most with seven goals in the nationals. From 2007, their performances slowly waned but not in 2010, it slowly continued up to 2017.

Between 2011 and 2015, Académico participated once every two years in the national championships after winning an island title. In 2015, the club scored 12 goals and 9 points and was placed third and did not participate in the playoffs. The 10 May match was suspended and was rescheduled to 3 June and Académica beat Sporting Brava 2–1. The club received the 2015 Fair Play Award. In 2015, the city opened a sports complex with artificial turf, a gym, a pool, an auditorium and a multipurpose hall.

Académico do Aeroporto made their third straight appearance at the national championships in mid-May and placed itself in Group B, this time, one of three groups, other clubs in the same group are another Académica club of Porto Novo, Mindelense and Paulense. Antunes has left the club as coach and Nelito is the clubs' new coach who came in May. In the past four rounds, the club did not make a win, they not have a two match losing streak and the club was listed as a non-participant in the upcoming playoffs and was last place in the group, the club lost to almighty Mindelense, the nation's two best club, the club picked up a position and finished third in the group with 5 points. The club did not have a low number of points in the regular season in over two decades.

==== Playoff participation ====
The team, Académico do Aeroporto were the first place champions for Sal Island in 2003 and 2006, Académico do Aeroporto had made it in the 2003 season and lost to FC Ultramarina, a team from Tarrafal 3–1 in the first leg, the second leg beat the team 3 to 2 and claimed the 2002–03 season title and is the only club from Sal Island to win a single national title, Pu scored the first two goals in the first leg, in the last Dixa scored the remainder in the next, the club did not achieve entry into the 2004 CAF Champions League the following year. The 2005–06 season saw the team in the second leg of the semi-finals to win six points, one of the highest in history on advancing to the finals, they competed with Sporting Clube da Praia, one of the best teams in Cape Verde and won 1–0 by Gerson in the first leg but Académico do Aeroporto was tied in the second leg but did not claim the 2005–06 title, it went to Sporting Clube da Praia with the most points. Their last playoff participation was in 2011 where they scored a single goal in each of the two matches with São Vicente's Mindelense, the club lost the first match, they later won the second match, their continuation of remaining in the playoffs was finished and finished as a semifinalist.

==== Cape Verdean Cup ====
As the club won their first and recent title for the club. It was the second club from Sal to appear at the second Cape Verdean Cup in the summer of 2009 and did not appear in the finals. They were one of four teams that participated in the national level.

== Stadium ==
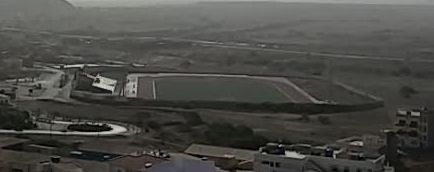
The home field of Académica do Aeroporto

Estádio Marcelo Leitão is a multi-use stadium in Espargos, Cape Verde. It is currently used mostly for football matches. The stadium holds 8,000. The stadium has seat rows in the east side and is east-southeast of the city center and Monte Curral. The stadium is home to the two best football clubs on the island, the other being Académica do Sal, other clubs based in Espargos includes Juventude which is based in Morro Curral and the stadium is being located inside the neighborhood. Other clubs based in Espargos but a neighborhood includes the recently added clubs of Gaviões, Chã de Matias and GDRC Pretória. Clubs playing the stadium but based on other parts of the island include Santa Maria, SC Verdun Pedra de Lume, Palmeira de Santa Maria and ASGUI, Florença.

== Uniform ==
Its uniform color has a T-shirt colored in half, amber yellow in the left and black on the right with black shorts and amber yellow socks used during home games and a uniform with black shorts and the remainder white for away games.

Its former uniform colours were yellow with a black short for home matches and black clothing for away matches up to the 2013 season. From September 2014 to early April 2017, its uniform all colored white used during away games.

Home uniform in 2014
Away uniform in 2014
Away uniform from September 2014 to early April 2017

== Rivalry ==
Académica do Sal is the club's only rival and is called the Airport Derby (Clássico da Ilha do Aeroprto, Derby of the Island of the Airport), where Espargos was founded upon, sometimes, it is known as the Derby of the Académicas of Sal or the Sal Island Derby, the only derby on the island.

== Honours ==
- National:
  - Cape Verdean Championship: 1

2003

- Regional:
  - Sal Island League: 15

1985/86, 1987/88, 1994/95, 2001/02, 2002/03, 2003/04, 2005/06, 2006/07, 2007/08, 2009/10, 2010/11, 2012/13, 2014/15, 2015/16, 2016-17

  - Taça Dja d'Sal (Sal Island Cup): 4

2001/02, 2003/04 or 2004/05?, 2005/06, 2008/09

  - Sal Island SuperCup: 6

2007/08, 2010/11, 2012/13, 2014/15, 2015/16, 2016/17

  - Sal Island Opening Tournament: 7

2004/05, 2005/06, 2008/09 2009/10, 2010/11, 2012/13, 2014/15

== League and cup history ==
=== National championship ===
Season	Div.	Pos.	Pl.	W	D	L	GS	GA	GD	P	Cup	Notes	Playoffs
1995	1C	2	2	0	2	0	-	-	-	2		Did not advance	Non-participant in the Final Phase
2002	1	4	8	5	1	2	17	11	+6	16			
2003	1B	1	5	4	0	1	7	1	+6	12		Promoted into playoffs	Champion
2004	1A	1	5	3	2	0	14	3	+11	11		Promoted into playoffs	Semifinalist
2006	1B	1	5	4	0	1	12	3	+9	12		Promoted into playoffs	Finalist
2007	1B	1	5	3	2	0	10	3	+7	11	Finalist	Promoted into playoffs	Semifinalist
2008	1A	3	5	3	1	1	7	5	+2	10		Did not advance	Did not participate
2009											Finalist		
2010	1B	1	5	4	1	0	12	4	+8	13		Promoted into playoffs	Semifinalist
2011	1B	2	4	2	2	0	8	5	+3	8			Semifinalist
2013	1A	3	5	2	3	0	3	1	+2	9		Did not advance	Did not participate
2015	1B	3	5	3	0	3	12	9	+3	9		Did not advance	Did not participate
2016	1B	3	5	2	1	2	4	4	0	7		Did not advance	Did not participate
2017	1B	3	6	1	2	3	6	10	-4	5		Did not advance	Did not participate

=== Island/Regional Championships ===
Season	Div.	Pos.	Pl.	W	D	L	GS	GA	GD	P	Cup	Notes
2005–06	2	1	10	-	-	-	-	-	-	-	Winner	Promoted into the National Championships
2006–07	2	1	10	-	-	-	-	-	-	-	Winner	Promoted into the National Championships
2007–08	2	1	10	-	-	-	-	-	-	-		Promoted into the National Championships
2008–09	2	1	10	-	-	-	-	-	-	-	Winner	Promoted into the National Championships
2009–10	2	1	10	-	-	-	-	-	-	-		Promoted into the National Championships
2010–11	2	1	10	-	-	-	-	-	-	-		Promoted into the National Championships
2012–13	2	1	10	-	-	-	-	-	-	-		Promoted into the National Championships
2013–14	2	2	10	6	1	3	18	8	+10	19		
2014–15	2	1	10	5	5	0	21	3	+18	20		Promoted into the National Championships
2015–16	2	1	14	11	2	1	30	7	+23	35	Finalist	Promoted into the National Championships
2016–17	2	1	14	10	1	3	29	12	+17	31	Finalist	Promoted into the National Championships
2017–18	2	4	14	7	2	5	24	17	+7	23	Semifinalist	

=== Association cup ===
Season	Group	Pos.	Pl.	W	D	L	GS	GA	GD	P	Finals
2005–06		1	-	-	-	-	-	-	-	-	
2009–10		1	-	-	-	-	-	-	-	-	
2010–11		1	-	-	-	-	-	-	-	-	
2012–13		1	-	-	-	-	-	-	-	-	
2014–15		1	-	-	-	-	-	-	-	-	
2017	B	1	3	2	0	1	3	4	-1	6	Finalist

== Statistics ==
- Best position: 1st (national)
- Best position at a cup competition: Finalist (national)
- Appearances:
  - National: 14
  - Regional: approx. 40
- Appearances at a cup competition:
  - National: 1
  - Regional: 19
- Best season: 2016 (11 wins, 2 draws, 1 loss)
- Highest number of goals in a season, National: 17 (regular season, record in 2002), 22 (total, record in 2006)
- Highest number of points in a season:
  - National: 16
  - Regional 35, in 2016
- Highest number of wins in a season:
  - National: 7
  - Regional: 11, in 2016
- Lowest number of wins scored in a season: 1 (national), in 2017
- Lowest number of points in a season: 2 (national), in 1995
- Highest number of goals conceded in a season: 11 (national)
- Highest number of losses in a season: 3 (national), in 2015 and in 2017

== Directorial history ==
- (Cape Verde) Mendes (2015-mid-February 2017)
- (Cape Verde) Ivan Lopes (since mid-February 2017)

== Chairmen history ==
Name	Nationality	From	To
Carlos Moniz	Cape Verde	in 2014	October 2015
Carlos Cabeto	Cape Verde	October 2015	November 2016
Carlos Moniz	Cape Verde	since November 2016	

== Managerial history ==
Name	Nationality	From	To
Lúcio Antunes	Cape Verde	2015	October 2016
Vacant		October	November 2016
Lúcio Antunes	Cape Verde	November 2016	May 2017
Nelito	Cape Verde	since May 2017	

== Other sports ==
Académico do Aeroporto
- Founded: 1980s
- Arena: Polidesportivo do Sal
- Website: http://www.academicosal.com/

Other sports that Académica has are basketball (second oldest), handball, volleyball (third oldest) and athletics. The team is a member of the Sal Regional Basketball Association (Associação Regioinal do Basquetebol (or Basquete) do Sal, ARBS).

Basketball and volleyball are played at Polidesportivo Municipal do Sal and athletics in the same stadium as football.
