= FC Juventude (Sal) =

Futebol Clube de Juventude
- Full name: Futebol Clube Juventude
- Nicknames: Juventud, "O Azul", Clube do Povo da Ilha do Sal
- Founded: 26 February 1962
- Ground: Estadio Marcelo Leitão; Sal, Cape Verde
- Capacity: 8,000
- Chairman: David Brito
- Manager: Djulhiano Santos
- League: Sal Island League
- 2015–16: 7th
Home colours	Away colours

Futebol Clube Juventude (Capeverdean Crioulo, also in the Sal Crioulo language, ALUPEC or ALUPEK: Juventudi) is a football (soccer) club that had played in the Premier division and plays in the Sal Island League in Cape Verde. It is based in the subdivision of Morro de Cural in the city of Espargos in the island of Sal. Juventude is the fifth successful football (soccer) club on the island, having won 7 official regional titles. As of the 2016–17 season, its chairman is David Brito and its coach is Djulhiano (not as Djuliano) Santos.

== History ==
The club was founded on 26 February 1962, and is the oldest club in Espargos, it was also the first to be founded outside Santa Maria, the north of the island and a neighborhood. The club celebrated its 10th anniversary in 1972 and its 25th anniversary in 1987 and 50th anniversary 2012.

The team entered the national division for the first time after independence in 1976 and lost a match there. Their second appearance was in 1990, and Juventude's only time they had a second consecutive appearance which was their third overall in 1991, Juventude played again in 1999 and recently in 2012. Between 1990 and 2014, Juventude was the last team to be left without a regional title before six additional clubs were formed and the regional competition having two divisions.

In 2010 the team won their first Sal Island Cup, thus qualifying for the Cape Verdean Cup, the national cup competition and be the third club to enter. Juventude are one of four teams that participated in the national level. Two more cup titles would be won for Sal Island, in 2014 and 2016. Juventude headed to their third super cup competition and faced Académica do Aeroporto do Sal, the regional champion in November 2016, Juventude lost to that club.

Its current chairman is David Brito who became in 2015 and its manager is Djul(h)iano Santos who managed SC Verdun in the 2014–15 season. The club did not do well, Juventude finished second to last and was the first that they finished 7th with 12 points, 3 wins and draws and 8 losses. A season later, Juventude's position was better and finished 3rd in 2017, they had 29 points, 9 draws, 2 points and 3 losses, shared with Santa Maria, Juventude scored 30 goals, 10 less than Santa Maria's.

The club started good for the 2017–18 season, Juventude scored the region's second highest scoring match with an 0–5 win over Gaviões. The club was third at the fifth round, behind the well-known clubs of Santa Maria and Palmeira and ahead of other well-known clubs of Académico do Aeroporto and Académica do Sal. Juventude was second and three clubs alongside Académico do Aeroporto and Palmeira Santa Maria had 10 points, 3 wins and a draw, Juventude had scored 12 goals at the 5th round. Juventude made a goal draw with Santa Maria on 27 January and Juventude lost a position to Palmeira, they had 16 goals scored, second in the region behind Santa Maria. Two more wins were made with 1 over nil each were made in the next two rounds and gained a position, that Palmeira had second with 20 points. Another win was made, a larger score 0–5 over the powerful Académica do Sal who is recently in low-moderate position, then a goal draw was made with Sal's most powerful club Académico with a goal apiece on 4 March. Juventude was still second, since the 10th round, same points and 7 wins as to Santa Maria, they had 24 goals scored, less than Santa Maria's. This round (round 11), they had the same wins as to Palmeira Sta. Maria. Unexpectedly Juventude lost to Florença on 11 March as well as a position and is now third, they shared their wins alongside Académico do Aeroporto. Juventude made a surprisingly win over ASGUI 3–2 on 18 March, alongside Palmeira and Santa Maria, they are contesting for a regional title. With 27 points, they may get a club record as their highest is 29 made last season, their final challenge with Santa Maria, this may be a possibility being a regional title contest.

== Stadium ==
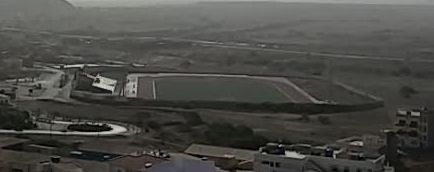
The home field of Juventude of Sal

Estádio Marcelo Leitão is a multi-use stadium in Espargos, Cape Verde. It is currently used mostly for football matches. The stadium holds 8,000. The stadium has seat rows in the east side and is east-southeast of the city center and Monte Curral. The stadium is home to the two best football clubs on the island, Académico do Aeroporto and Académica do Sal. Other clubs based in Espargos but a neighborhood includes the newly established clubs of Gaviões and Chã de Matias. Clubs playing the stadium but based on other parts of the island include Santa Maria, SC Verdun Pedra de Lume, Palmeira de Santa Maria and ASGUI, Florença.

== Logo ==
Its logo color is blue and reads the club name and the island name in the middle of the soccer ball. Its slogan is "Sports and Progress" ("Desporte e Progresso"), it also gives its name to its nickname O Azul.

== Uniform ==
Its uniform colors are all sky blue for home matches and a blue-white striped shirt (three blue stripes and four white) with blue sleeves and the remainder blue for away or alternate matches.

Home uniform up to March 31, 2017
Away uniform up to March 31, 2017

Until 31 March 2017, its uniform colors had a sky blue T-shirt and the other colors were white and the whole colors for away games.

== Honours ==
- Sal Island League: 5

1976, 1989/90, 1990/91, 1998/99, 2011/12

- Sal Island Cup: 3

2010, 2014, 2016

== League and cup history ==
=== National championship ===
Season	Div.	Pos.	Pl.	W	D	L	GS	GA	GD	P	Cup	Notes	Playoffs
1999	1A	2	6	3	1	2	9	11	-2	10		Did not advance	Did not participate
2012	1A	3	5	2	2	1	8	9	-1	8		Did not advance	Did not participate

=== Island/Regional Championship ===
Season	Div.	Pos.	Pl.	W	D	L	GS	GA	GD	P	Cup	Notes
2011–12	2	1	10	-	-	-	-	-	-	-		Promoted into the National Championships
2013–14	2	6	10	2	0	8	7	22	-15	6	Winner	
2014–15	2	5	10	3	3	4	11	14	-4	12		
2015–16	2	7	14	3	3	8	17	23	-6	12	Winner	
2016–17	2	3	14	9	2	3	30	14	+16	29		
2017–18	2	3	14	8	4	2	29	12	+17	28	Semi-finalist	

=== Association cup ===
Season	Group	Pos.	Pl.	W	D	L	GS	GA	GD	P	Finals
2017	B	2	3	1	2	0	5	2	+3	5	Did not appear

== Statistics ==
- Highest number of points in a season:
  - National: 10, in 1999
  - Regional: 29, in 2017
- Best position at a cup competition: First Phase (national)
- Appearances in a cup competition:
  - National: 1
  - Regional: 19
- Appearances in a regional Super Cup competition: 4
- Worst position: 7th

== Chairmen ==
- (Cape Verde) Nelson Figueiredo (January–October 2015)
- (Cape Verde) David Brito (since October 2015)
