= Monte Curral =

Hill in Espargos, Cape Verde

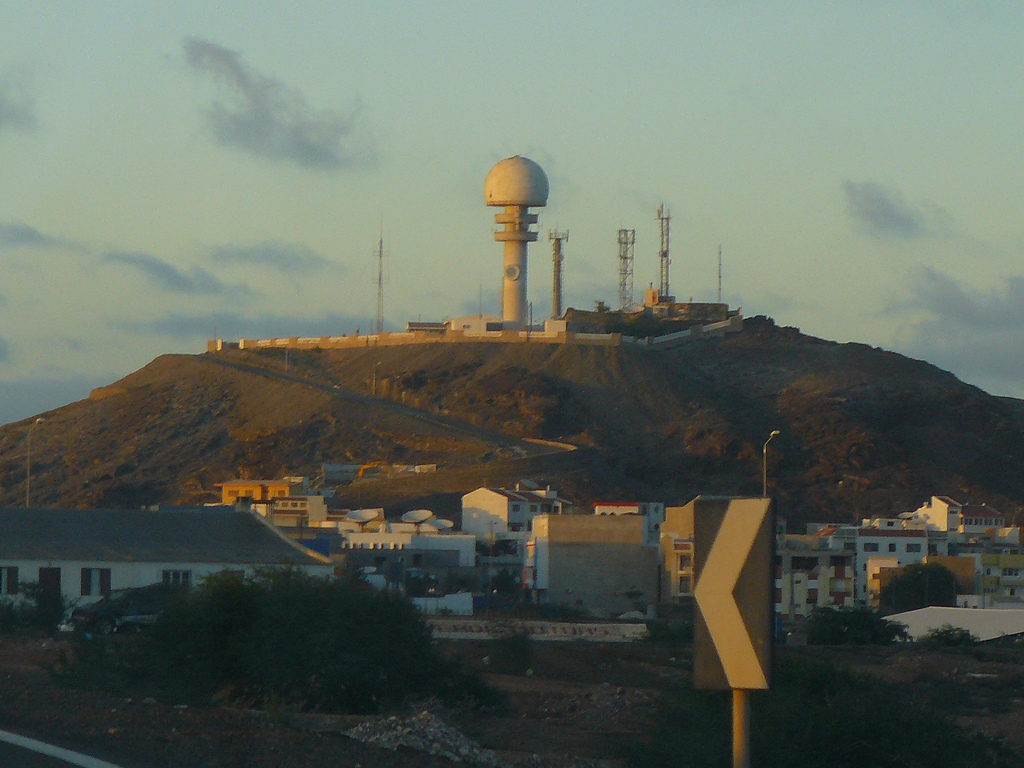
- Monte Curral with the airport's control tower

Highest point
- Elevation: 109 m (358 ft)
- Listing: List of mountains in Cape Verde
- Coordinates: 16°45′26″N 22°56′34″W

Geography
- Location within Cape Verde
- Location: Espargos, northern Sal island

Geology
- Mountain type: Formation

Monte Curral is a hill in the city of Espargos, on the island of Sal, Cape Verde. Its elevation is 109 meters. On the summit there is an air control tower for the nearby Amílcar Cabral International Airport, as well as several telecommunication masts.

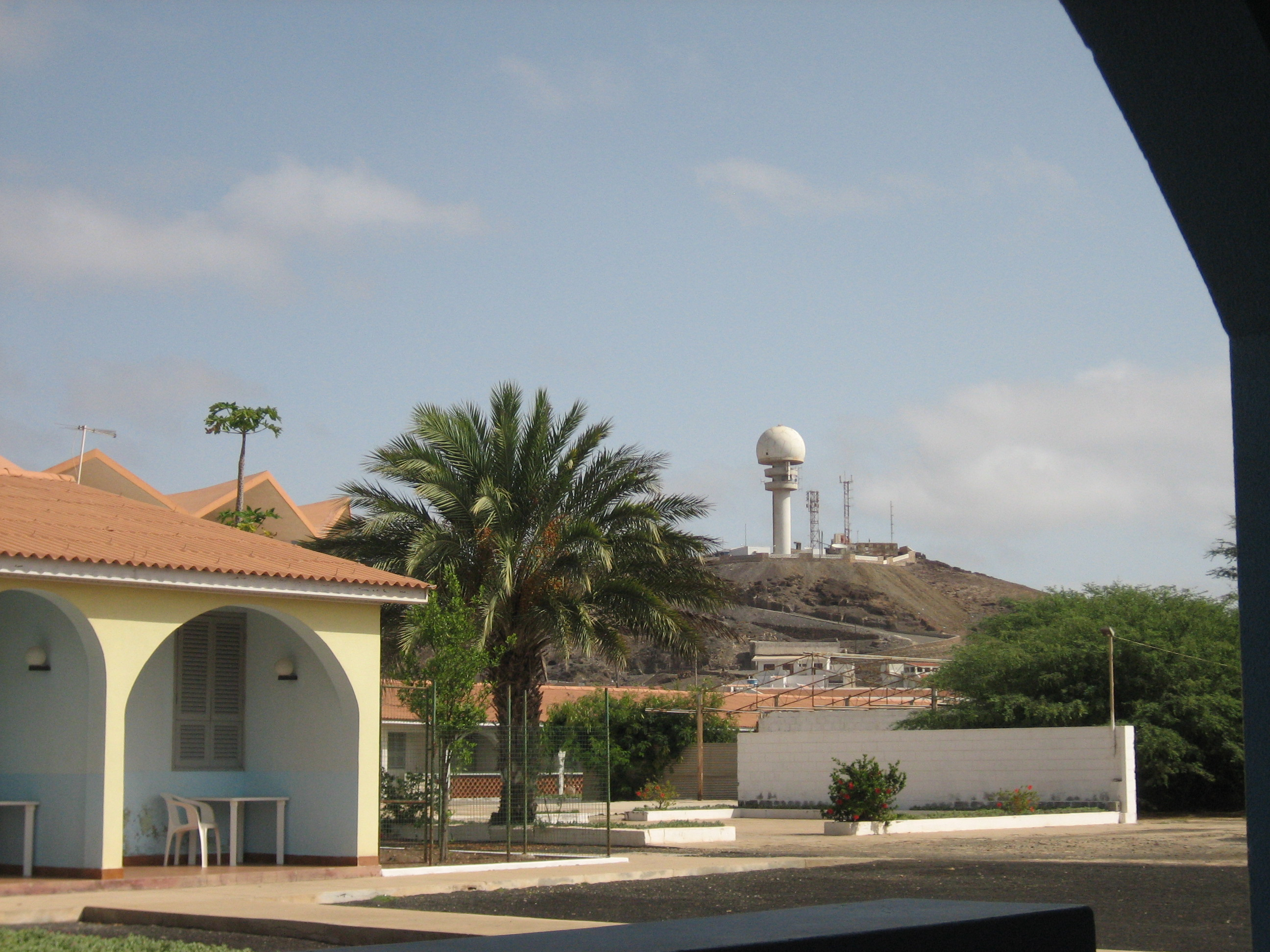
Another view of Monte Curral with its transmitters and traffic control tower

== See also ==
- List of mountains in Cape Verde
