= GD Palmeira =

Palmeira Palméra
- Full name: Grupo Desportivo Palmeira
- Ground: Municipal Stadium (Estádio Municipal); Santa Maria, Cape Verde
- Capacity: 1,000 chairman =
- League: Sal Premier Division
- 2025–26: 1st, Champion
Home colours	Away colours	Third colours

Grupo Desportivo Palmeira (Capeverdean Crioulo, ALUPEC or ALUPEK: Palméra, also in the Sal Crioulo) is a football club that had played in the Premier division and plays in the Sal Island League in Cape Verde. It is based in the town of Santa Maria and plays in its municipal stadium north of the town center. Palmeira is the fourth successful football (soccer) club on the island, having won 8 official regional titles.

== Origin of the name ==
The name mainly originates from several palms in the area, one area, there are palms on Avenida Amílcar Cabral today, since there is a village name Palmeira in the west of the island which has the same origin, the team does not owe its name from a village on the same island. To avoid confusion, the club mainly calls it under the name Palmeira do Sul do Sal or Palmeira de Santa Maria

== Logo ==
Its logo contains a green colored (or palm) shield with three white lines and the abbreviated full form on top, Palmeira on top of the second shield which has a palm tree in which it is named after with a football or a soccer ball, the island name in Portuguese is on the bottom. The logo (except for its top part and the bottom part of the shield) is the same to today's Sporting CP logo and is the club's semi-affiliate.

== History ==
The team participated in the first two national championship competitions after winning two Sal titles since independence, their first in 1985 and another fifteen years later in 2000, but has never won any titles at national level. At the 2000 competition, Palmeira was in Group B, they failed to win a match or score a goal, their first competition was at the second round on August 20 and was a loss to Fogo's Vulcânicos. Palmeira's only national draw was made with São Vicente's FC Derby without any goals scored at the final round.

Palmeira's first cup title was in 2012 and was the last club to enter at the national level. They appeared at the fourth Cape Verdean Cup in the summer of 2012 and did not appear in the finals. They were one of four teams that participated in the national level. Palmeira won a second consecutive title in 2013. Three years later, they won their recent title. It made Palmeira's fifth and recent Super Cup appearance and fourth as a cup winner, the club lost to Académica do Aeroporto in the 2015 edition.

Palmeira's first super cup title was in 2000, their recent was in 2012, entered as regional champion.

Their first insular opening tournament title was won in 2007, and it is their only one.

Palmeira Santa Maria started second in the 2017–18 Premier Division with a win over Juventude, a week later, a scoreless draw with Académica do Sal was made, on December 17, they made a 1–4 win over Gaviões and put the club in the top positions. Alongside Académico do Aeroporto and Juventude has 10 points, 3 wins and a draw, the club is fourth as they scored a total of eight goals, one less than Académico do Aeroporto's. Palmeira was second, then they were third at round 5. Recently Palmeira Santa Maria made two more wins with their first, and 1–4 win away over the mighty Académico do Aeroporto and their last over Florença Santa Maria where they got their second place back. Palmeira lost to Juventude along with its second position. Palmeira defeated Académica Sal, a club formerly successful and remained third. Palmeira made a draw with Gaviões without any goals scored, then a huge 2–5 win over ASGUI and is contesting for another possible regional championship title as they had 23 points, one less than Santa Maria's and Juventude's. Also they scored a total of 21 goals, same as Académico do Aeroporto. At round 12, they took the first-placed position from Santa Maria after their 1–3 win and gained a chance for another regional title and has 26 points. Another win, an unexpected one over the powerful Académico do Aeroporto came and had 29 points, already reached club record, over their 23 made in 2000 and since the 2015–16 expansion to eight teams. Palmeira's final match was a 1–3 win over Florença and finished with a new record of 32 points, with four points over Santa Maria and Juventude. Palmeira finally claimed their next regional title in 18 years, in overall titles, they became the fifth in Sal remaining behind Juventude but ahead of Verdun Pedra de Lume. Palmeira now appears in Group C in the national division in April.

In the regional cup semis, they made a two-goal draw with Juventude then defeated that club 3–4 in the penalty shootout and in some seasons, they came to the cup final and faced Santa Maria on March 31, they lost the title after losing 1–0 in extra time.

At the 2018 National Division, Palmeira Santa Maria made a goal draw with Fogo's Vulcânico on April 14. At round 2, they made their first national championship win where they defeated almighty Sporting Praia Next, a huge 4–2 win over Barrerirense of Maio was made, currently the nation's highest, then a loss to the same club was followed. Palmeira defeated Fogo's Vulcânicos and with 10 points, a success that Palmeira Santa Maria never endured, they are leaders in Group C and head to the semis in mid-May. Their 6th and final round would be a challenge with Sporting Praia in which they were defeated.

The 2022 cape-verdean championship, which took place after two seasons without being held, due to the COVID-19 pandemic, Palmeira, as Sal's champions managed to reach their first final. In the final match, which was held on the island of Boa Vista, Palmeira were defeated by Académica do Mindelo (1–0).

In the 2023 season, the team managed to reach their second consecutive final, facing once again Académica do Mindelo, the defending national champions. The final was held on the island of Maio, on June 8. After the matched ended 1–1, Palmeira beat Académica do Mindelo, via a penalty shootout (7–6), thus becoming national champions for the first time in their history.

== Honours ==
- Cape Verdean Football Championships

2023, 2025

- Sal Island League/Premier Division: 3

1984/85, 1999/00, 2018

- Sal Island Cup: 3

2012, 2013, 2015

- Sal Island SuperCup: 1

1999/00, 2011/12

- Sal Island Opening Tournament: 1

2006/07

== League and cup history ==
=== National championship ===
Season	Div.	Pos.	Pl.	W	D	L	GS	GA	GD	P	Notes	Playoffs
2000	1B	3	2	0	1	1	0	1	-1	1	Did not advance	Did not participate
2018	1C	1	6	3	1	2	8	7	+1	10	Advanced into the playoffs	Finalist
2022	1B	1	6	4	1	1	10	5	+5	13	Advanced into the playoffs	Finalist
2023	1B	1	6	4	0	2	10	6	+4	12	Advanced into the playoffs	Winner

=== Island/Regional Championship ===
Season	Div.	Pos.	Pl.	W	D	L	GS	GA	GD	P	Cup	Notes
2001	2	1	10	-	-	-	-	-	-	23		Promoted into the National Championships
2012	2	4	10	4	2	4	13	12	+1	14	Winner	Promoted into the National Championships
2013	2	2	10	6	4	0	21	9	+12	22	Winner	Promoted into the National Championships
2013–14	2	4	10	4	3	3	15	13	+2	15		
2014–15	2	2	10	5	5	0	14	5	+9	20	Winner	
2015–16	2	4	14	6	3	5	23	13	+10	21		
2016–17	2	6	14	4	3	7	12	20	-8	15		
2017–18	2	1	14	10	2	2	29	10	+19	32	Finalist	Promoted into the National Championships

=== Association cup ===
Season	Group	Pos.	Pl.	W	D	L	GS	GA	GD	P	Finals
2017	B	3	3	1	1	1	4	2	+2	4	Did not appear

== Statistics ==
- Best position: 4th (national)
- Best position at a cup competition: First Round (national)
- Best position at an opening tournament: 1st (regional)
- Appearances in a cup competition:
  - National: 1
  - Regional: 18
- Appearances in a regional Super Cup competition: 5
- Best season: 2018 (10 wins, 2 draws, 32 points)
- Highest number of points in a season: 32, in 2018
- Highest number of wins in a season: 10, in 2018
