= Taça Nacional de Cabo Verde =

Taça Nacional de Cabo Verde Cape Verdean National Cup
- Founded: 1982
- Region: Cape Verde
- Teams: 11
- Current champions: Palmeira (1st time)
- Most championships: Boavista Praia; Mindelense (2 titles each)
- Broadcaster(s): TCV (television); RTC (radio)
- 2026 Taça Nacional de Cabo Verde

The Taça de Cabo Verde (Portuguese for the Cape Verdean Cup, also as the Capeverdean Cup) is the main knock-out football tournament of the Cape Verde islands. It started in 1982, it was later revived in 2007 and is played annually. The competition features the winners of each island or regional cup competition and competes into two groups.

== History ==
The first edition took place in 1982 and was only broadcast on radio, television broadcasts did not began until 1997, its first telecast of the cup competition began in 2007. Most of the matches, all of the semis and finals were broadcast on TCV and RCV. Some of the matches were broadcast on regional television and radio including Rádio Barlavento and Rádio Praia (or AM Praia).

From the 2013 edition, the winner competes in the Cape Verdean Cup, the only time done was Onze Unidos, the 2012 cup winner.

== Winners ==
Year	Winners	Score	Runners-up
1982	Mindelense	1–0	Morabeza [Brava]
1983–06	Not played		
2007	Académica da Praia	3–1	Académica do Sal
2008	Not played		
2009	Boavista Praia	1–0	Académico Sal
2010	Boavista Praia (champion in final round)		
2011	Not played		
2012	Onze Unidos	2–1 (aet)	Académica Porto Novo
2013–16	Not played (Note: Not held due to financial and scheduling concerns)		
2017	Canceled (Note: The 2017 edition was possibly to be held, with the knockout stage of the national championships continued into late-August, the cup competition was not held)		
2018	Sporting Clube da Praia	2–1	Santa Maria
2019	Santo Crucifixo	3–2	Palmeira
2020	Cancelled (Note: Due COVID-19 pandemic in Cape Verde)		
2021	Not played		
2022	Travadores	5–1	Figueirense
2023	Académica do Mindelo	1–0	Barreirense
2024	Mindelense	2–1	Palmeira
2025	Palmeira	1–0	Sport Sal Rei Club

== Total ==
Club	Titles
Boavista Praia	2
Mindelense	2
Académica da Praia	1
Onze Unidos	1
Sporting Clube da Praia	1
Santo Crucifixo	1
Travadores	1
Académica do Mindelo	1
Palmeira	1

== See also ==
- Cape Verdean Football Championships
- Cape Verdean Super Cup
