= SC Santa Maria =

Santa Maria
- Full name: Sport Clube Santa Maria
- Nickname: Santá
- Founded: April 1, 1937
- Ground: Municipal Stadium (Estádio Municipal); Santa Maria, Sal, Cape Verde; Estadio Marcelo Leitão; Espargos, Sal
- Chairman: Octavio Almeida
- Manager: Carlos Nunes
- League: Sal Premier Division
- 2023–24: 4rd
Home colours	Away colours

Sport Clube Santa Maria (also in Capeverdean Crioulos of ALUPEC or ALUPEK and Sal) is a football club that had played in the Premier division and plays in the Sal Island League in Cape Verde. It is based in the town of Santa Maria in the southern part of the island of Sal. Santa Maria is the third successful football (soccer) club on the island, having won 10 official regional titles.

== History ==
The club was founded on April 1, 1937, and is the oldest on the island. It was once the island's only club until 1948. It is one of the most titled teams in the Sal regional division, with 7.

The club participated 8 times at the national level. Their greatest appearance was in the national finals, where they lost to Académica do Mindelo in the 1989 edition. As Académico do Aeroporto won their only national title in 2003, Santa Maria qualified as a runner-up in 2004, the club only had a draw and finished 5th with a point. The club was next qualified as a runner-up since the early 1990s. Their recent appearance was in 2009 after winning their last championship title. The club also did not have a win but had two draws, a little better than five years later, with six goals scored, the club finished 5th with 2 points.

The club won its only Super Cup title in 2009. On December 30, 2016, Santa Maria won their first Association Cup/Opening Tournament title for the 2016–17 season on the island.

The club celebrated their 50th anniversary in 1987, the club celebrated their 75th anniversary in 2012.

In the 2016–17 season, Santa Maria started in second place. After a win over Verdun in the 2nd round, the club was in the lead until a loss to Juventude on April 14, and became second, which would be for the rest of the season. On April 30, the final match of the season, Santa Maria made the highest scoring match in the region, where they defeated Gaviões 1–10. Santa Maria finished with 29 points, two fewer than Académica do Aeroporto's; the club scored 40 goals, the most in the nation.

Santa Maria participated in the 2017–18 season with the island's association cup, placed first in Group A, and advanced to play in the final match and defeated Académico do Aeroporto 1–0 in extra time to win their second straight title; the only scorer was Tchubasco. Santa Maria kicked off the 2017–18 Sal Premier Division with first place with three points, another win was made and a high scoring in two regional championship matches, they defeated ASGUI 2–9 and is currently the region's highest of the season, the club is first place as of the third round as they recently defeated the island's most popular club Académico do Aeroporto, a repeat of what they did in the Opening Tournament final and contested to be the top three clubs of the island as the club is the first of the four participating historic clubs in the Premier Division. At round 4, they were first place, more than the other participating historic clubs of the island, two more than Juventude, three more than Académico do Aeroporto, and five more than Académica do Sal. Santa Maria was one position ahead of Juventude. three ahead of Académico do Aeroporto and six ahead of Académica do Sal. Santa Maria is still first at the seventh round, midway in the Premier Division, as they did last season, and has 19 points and has scored 24 goals, at that round, an unheard number over 17 last season. Their next win was 6–1 over Gaviões on January 21. A goal draw with Juventude was next, followed by another win over Florença Santa Maria, then a repeat of a goal draw, this time with ASGUI. Santa Maria lost to the powerful Académico do Aeroporto afterwards, before a repeat of a goal draw, this time with Académica Sal on March 3. Santa Maria remains in first place as of the 11th round. For two rounds from the 10th round, they had equal points with Juventude, also they had 30 goals scored and seven wins, the latter the same with Juventude since the 10th round and Palmeira in the 11th round. In the 2017–18 Sal Island Cup, the club started at the first round, where they defeated Oasis FC 3–1 in their first ever match with that club. Santa Maria had a bye week at the quarterfinals. In the semis, the club defeated Académico do Aeroporto and later became a participant in the final. Santa Maria recently lost another Premier Division match, 1–3 to Palmeira, and its first position. Santa Maria was second with 24 points; they were still the masters in goals with 31 scored. Their points the same as Juventude's at round 12. Santa Maria made another win with a big result of 0–6 over Gaviões and were one of three teams that have a regional championship title waiting next round, also waiting are possible club records in points and goals, as Santa Maria has 37 goals scored. Their final match was against Juventude, which ended in a two-goal draw. Palmeira's win had Santa Maria failing for another championship title, and it finished second behind Palmeira. Sal scored the region's most goals with 39, a goal less than last season, failing to make another club record. On March 31, the regional cup finals were played with Palmeira Santa Maria, which went into extra time and finally won their only cup title after winning 1–0, also becoming the city's second and most recent club to have a cup title. Santa Maria will qualify for the Super Cup, first made on March 25, their status became as cup winner on March 31, they will play with the champion Palmeira later at the end of the season.

== Logo ==
Its logo represents a shield with a red line with another line and its abbreviated form on top, it features the Atlantic Ocean on the bottom, coloured from sky blue to navy blue with a soccer ball and a boat in the middle overlooking its setting sun, which is colored along with the setting evening skies of yellow, light orange, orange, and red.

== Stadium ==
Santa Maria has its own stadium located in the north of town, then as a field; it was the first sports facility on the island, opened in the 1940s. It moved locations in the 1990s, just next to its saline marsh. The club uses Estádio Marcelo Leitão where all of its matches are played.

== Uniform ==
Home uniform in 2010
Visitor's uniform in 2010

Its clothing colors are red with a white left sleeve, a white tag on the back, and a white rim on the right sleeve used for home games. Its colors are opposite to those of white clothing, and others red for away or alternate games.

Up to 2014 or 2015, its jersey has a red shirt and socks and white pants for its home games.

== Honours ==
- Sal Island League: 7

1982, 1987, 1989, 1992, 1997, 1998, 2009

- Sal Island Cup: 1

2017-18

- Sal Island SuperCup: 1

2009

- Sal Island Opening Tournament Premier Division: (Note: Also known as the Association Cup) 2

2016/17, 2017

=== Other ===
- Armed Forces Cup (Taça de Forças Armadas): 1

2016/17

== League and cup history ==
=== National championship ===
Season	Div.	Pos.	Pl.	W	D	L	GS	GA	GD	P	Notes	Playoffs
2004	1B	5	4	0	1	3	3	11	-8	1	Did not advance	Did not participate
2009	1A	5	5	0	2	3	6	13	-7	2	Did not advance	Did not participate

=== Island/Regional Championship ===
Season	Div.	Pos.	Pl.	W	D	L	GS	GA	GD	P	Cup	Notes
2003–04	2	2	10	-	-	-	-	-	-	-		
2008–09	2	1	10	-	-	-	-	-	-	-		Promoted into the National Championships
2013–14	2	3	10	5	1	4	14	9	+5	16		
2014–15	2	4	10	4	2	4	14	12	+2	4		Promoted into the National Championships
2015–16	2	3	14	7	1	6	20	17	+3	22		
2016–17	2	2	14	9	2	3	40	17	+23	29		
2017–18	2	2	14	8	4	2	39	15	+24	39	Winner	

=== Association cup ===
Season	Group	Pos.	Pl.	W	D	L	GS	GA	GD	P	Finals
2016–17		1	-	-	-	-	-	-	-	-	Winner
2017	A	1	3	2	1	0	8	2	6	7	Winner

== Statistics ==
- Best position: 2nd (national)
- Best position at an opening tournament: 1st
- Best position at a cup competition: 1st (regional)
- Best season: 2017 (40 goals, 29 points)
- Appearances in the national competition: 8
- Appearances at the regional cup competition: 18
- Appearances at the regional Super Cup competition: Once, in 2009 – total appearance remains for a few more months and will become 2 appearances

== Current squad ==
As of 11 February 2017

Note: Flags indicate national team as defined under FIFA eligibility rules; some limited exceptions apply. Players may hold more than one non-FIFA nationality.

No.	Pos.	Nation	Player
1		CPV	Fá (Note: Also as Fa)
2		CPV	Dwalter
3		CPV	Tcheps
4		CPV	Ary
5		CPV	Tchu
6		CPV	Khun
7		CPV	Kichon
8		CPV	Rony (Note: Also known as Ronny)
10		CPV	Duda
11		CPV	Rody II
12		CPV	Beto
13		CPV	Dery (Note: Also known as Derry)
14		CPV	Josiry

No.	Pos.	Nation	Player
16		CPV	Leo
17			Kakoya
18			Koue
20		CPV	Edu (Note: Sometimes known as Edw (pronunciation: not as Edoo))
21			Moussa
22			Abdou
23		CPV	To (Note: Also as Tó)
24		CPV	Tonas
25		CPV	Djicas
26		CPV	Paulo R.
27		CPV	Paulo S.
28		CPV	Rudy
99		CPV	Wiliam

== Chairmen history ==
Name	Nationality	From	To
Simão Diniz	Cape Verde	in 2010	
Paulino Gabriel	Cape Verde	in 2015	late 2016
Américo Soares	Cape Verde	since late 2016	

== Managerial history ==
Name	Nationality	From	To
Ben-Hur Évora	Cape Verde	in 2010	
Táta (Agostinho Ramos)	Cape Verde	in 2015	2016
Kiki Rocha	Cape Verde	since 2016	

== Other sports ==
The sports club also has athletics. Its athletics competitions are competed at Estádio Marcelo Leitão in Espargos.
