= ALUPEC =

Alphabet for Cape Verdean Creole

The Alfabeto Unificado para a Escrita do Caboverdiano (Unified Alphabet for Cape Verdean Writing), commonly known as ALUPEC, is the alphabet that was officially recognized by the Cape Verdean government to write Cape Verdean Creole.

== Description ==
The ALUPEC is a phonetic writing system based on the Latin script and states only which letters should be used to represent each sound. The system does not establish rules for spelling (orthography). For that reason, Cape Verdean creole writing is not standardized; the same word or the same sentence may appear written in different ways. Cape Verdeans write idiosyncratically — that is, each person writes in his or her own dialect, sociolect, and idiolect.

The descriptive texts concerning the ALUPEC claim that it is "a system composed by 23 letters and four digraphs". What those texts do not specify is that the ALUPEC also includes the letter Y and the digraph RR.

Older documents, such as the 1994 Proposed Criteria of the Unified Alphabet for the Cape Verdean Writing System, showed the following order:
A B S D E F G H I J DJ L LH M N NH N̈ O P K R T U V X TX Z

Later documents (after 1998) show the following order:
A B D DJ E F G H I J K L LH M N NH N̈ O P R S T TX U V X Z

The ALUPEC comes close to a perfect phonetic system in that almost every letter represents only one sound and almost every sound is represented by only one letter. The vowels may have a graphic accent, but the system does not consider letters with accents as separate letters.

Letter	IPA	Description
a	/a/ or /ɐ/	like a in Portuguese pá or like a in (European) Portuguese para
á	/a/	like a in Portuguese pá
â	/ɐ/	like a in (European) Portuguese para
b	/b/	like b in English but
d	/d/	like d in Portuguese dedo
dj	/dʒ/	like j in English just
e	/e/ *	like e in Portuguese dedo, never like i in Portuguese filho * see notes on Barlavento usage
é	/ɛ/	like e in Portuguese ferro
ê	/e/	like e in Portuguese dedo
f	/f/	like f in English for
g	/ɡ/	always like g in English go, never like s in English pleasure
h		used only in the digraphs lh and nh
i	/i/ or /j/	like i in Portuguese vi or like y in English yes
í	/i/	like i in Portuguese vi
j	/ʒ/	like s in English measure
k	/k/	like c in Portuguese caco
l	/l/	like l in French elle
lh	/ʎ/	like lh in Portuguese filho
m	/m/	like m in English me
n	/n/	like n in Portuguese não
nh	/ɲ/	like nh in Portuguese ninho
n̈ (n with diaeresis)	/ŋ/	like ng in English king
o	/o/	like o in Portuguese amor never like u in Portuguese tu
ó	/ɔ/	like o in Portuguese porta
ô	/o/	like o in Portuguese amor
p	/p/	like p in Portuguese para
r	/ɾ/ or /ʀ/	like r in Portuguese porta or like r in Portuguese rato
rr	/ʀ/	like rr in Portuguese ferro
s	/s/ *	like s in Portuguese sim, never like z in Portuguese zero * see notes on Barlavento usage
t	/t/	like t in Portuguese tu
tx	/tʃ/	like ch in English chair
u	/u/ or /w/	like u in Portuguese tu or like w in English wet
ú	/u/	like u in Portuguese tu
v	/v/	like v in English vain
x	/ʃ/	like sh in English ship, never like the Portuguese words sexo, próximo or exame
z	/z/	like z in Portuguese zero

Additional notes:

- The letter y is used only to represent the copulative conjunction (corresponding to "e" in Portuguese, which means and), in the same fashion as in Spanish.
- The letter r has the sound /ʀ/ only in the beginning of the words.
- The letter n in the end of the syllables is not pronounced, it only indicates the nasality of the preceding vowel.
- The personal pronoun that represents the subject form of the first person of the singular (English “I”) is always written with the capital letter N, whatever the pronunciation, whatever the Creole variant.
- The graphic accents are used to indicate the stressed syllable in proparoxytone words, and to indicate the stressed syllable in oxytone words that do not end in a consonant; the acute accent is also used in paroxytone words when the stressed syllable has the sounds /ɛ/ or /ɔ/.
- When writing Santo Antão Creole and São Vicente Creole, the letter s can be pronounced as [s], [ʃ], and [ʒ], depending on context. This mostly corresponds to the (European) Portuguese s, except, as noted, the intervocalic s (pronounced [z] in Portuguese). See Portuguese phonology.
- When writing Barlavento Creoles, the letter e is written in the place of vowels that would exist in equivalent Sotavento words. If this written vowel was simply omitted, syllables could be left without vowels, or consonants left at the end of a word, in ways deemed improper. For example:
  - /dbɔʃ/ is written debóxe, not dbóx (compare Sotavento dibaxu)
  - /amdʒers/ is written amedjeres, not amdjers (Sotavento mudjeris)
    This is a contradiction within the ALUPEC, which intends to be a phonetic system in that every letter should represent only one sound and every sound should be represented by only one letter. Some words in Barlavento Creoles will have, therefore, a dubious representation, with the pronunciation to be deduced by context. Examples:

word with the phoneme /e/ indeed	translation into English	Word with the phoneme elided	comparison with the same word in Sotavento Creoles	translation into English
bejon /beˈʒõ/	big kiss	bejon /bʒõ/	bujon /buˈʒõ/	imaginary bird that haunts children (Pt: abujão)
kemâ /keˈmɐ/	to burn	kemâ /kmɐ/	kumâ /kuˈmɐ/	that (subordinating conjunction)
pelâ /peˈlɐ/	to peel	pelâ /plɐ/	pilâ /piˈlɐ/	to pound
petâ /peˈtɐ/	to defy someone with the chest	petâ /ptɐ/	botâ /boˈtɐ/	to throw
pezâ /peˈzɐ/	to weigh	pezâ /pzɐ/	pizâ /piˈzɐ/	to step on
remâ /ʀeˈmɐ/	to row	remâ /ʀmɐ/	rumâ /ʀuˈmɐ/	to put in place, to arrange
se /se/	his / her	se /s/	si /si/	if

== History ==
The ALUPEC emerged in 1994, from the alphabet proposed by the Colóquio Linguístico de Mindelo, in 1979.

On 20 July 1998, the ALUPEC was approved by the Conselho de Ministros de Cabo Verde, for a five-year trial period. According to the same council, the ALUPEC would "take into account the diversity of the Cape Verdean Language in all the islands, and only after that trial period its introduction in schools would be considered".

In 2005, the ALUPEC was recognized by the Cape Verdean government as a viable system for writing the Cape Verdean Creole, becoming the first (and as of 2023 the only) alphabet to attain such status. Nevertheless, the same law allows the usage of alternative writing models, "as long they are presented in a systematized and scientific way".

In 2009, Decree-Law No. 8/2009 officially institutionalized the use of the ALUPEC.

In spite of having been officially recognized by the state, the usage of ALUPEC is neither official nor mandatory.
