= Espargos =

- Settlement
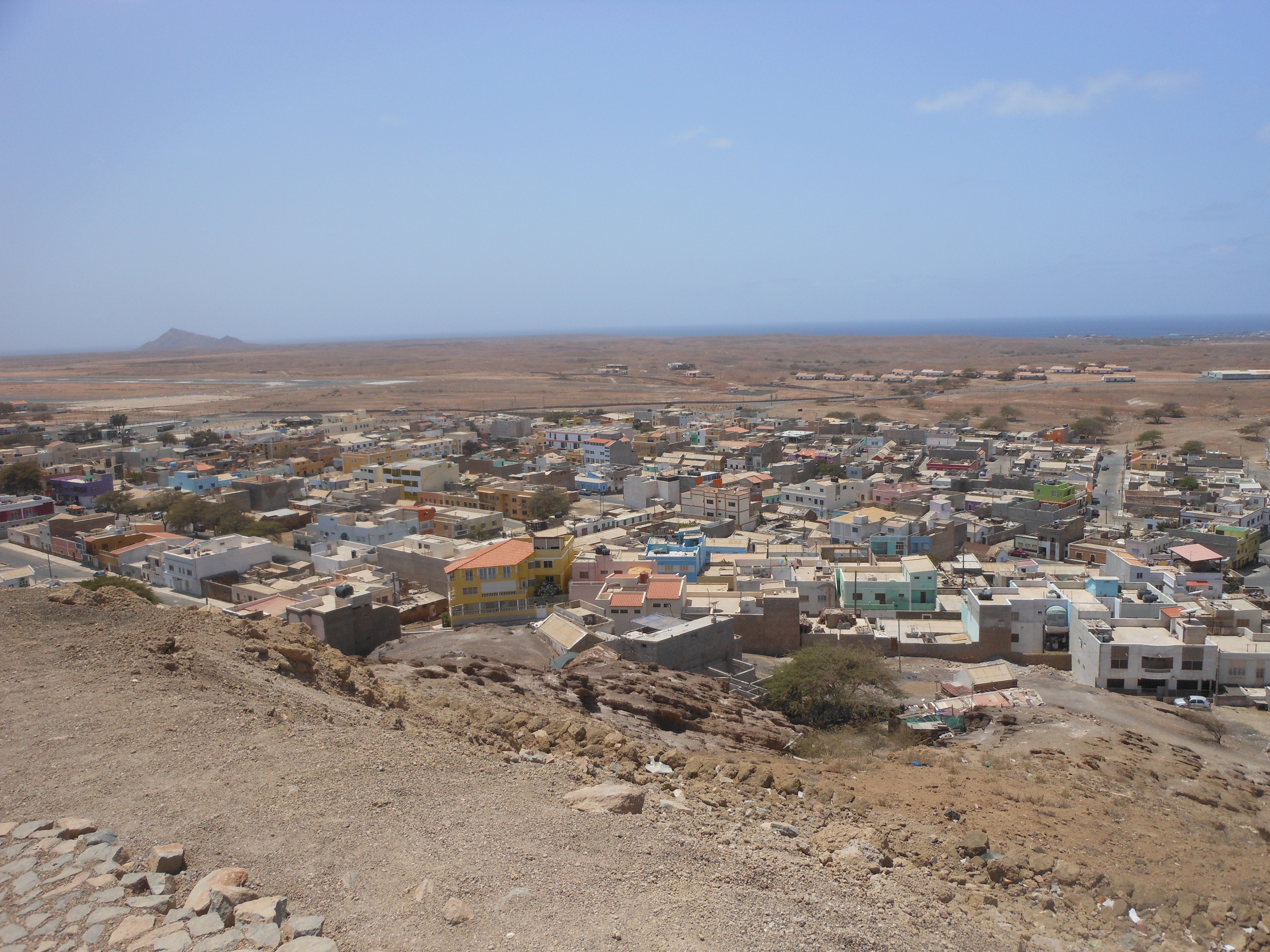

- Location within Cape Verde
- Coordinates: 16.756°N 22.946°W
- Country: Cape Verde
- Island: Sal
- Municipality: Sal
- Civil parish: Nossa Senhora das Dores

Population (2010)
  - Total: 17,081
- ID: 41106

Espargos (Portuguese for "asparagus") is the capital and main commercial centre of the island and municipality of Sal, Cape Verde. The city is situated in the heart of the island.

== Geography ==
The highest point of Espargos is Monte Curral, elevation 109 meters, where the radar station and the control tower for the airport are located. The Amílcar Cabral International Airport is situated directly southwest of the city centre. The head offices of Cabo Verde Express are located at the airport. The national road EN1-SL01, a dual carriageway, connects Espargos with Santa Maria in the south of the island. Other national roads connect it with Pedra de Lume and Palmeira.

For statistical purposes, the city of Espargos is divided into 24 localities (lugares). The most populous of these are: África 70, Bairro Novo I, Bairro Novo II (Ribeira d'Hoz), Chã de Matias, Chã de Fraqueza, Hortelã de Baixo, Hortelã de Cima, Preguiça and Ribeira Funda.

== History ==
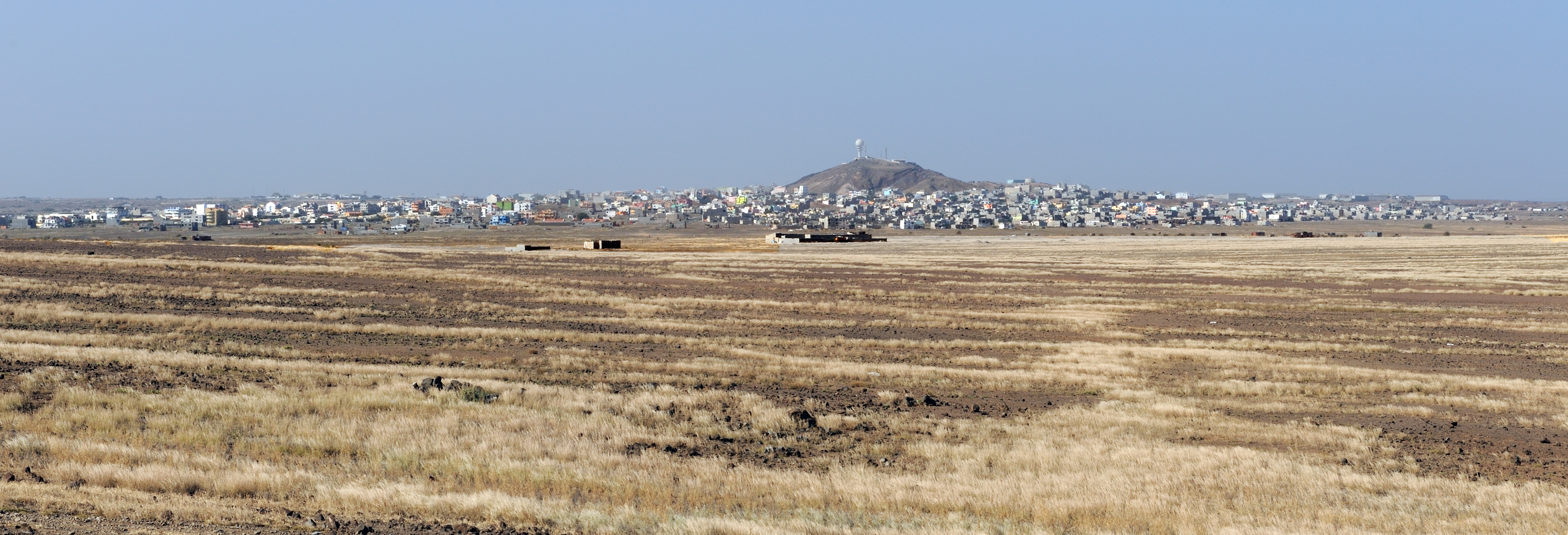
Panoramic view of Espargos from the west

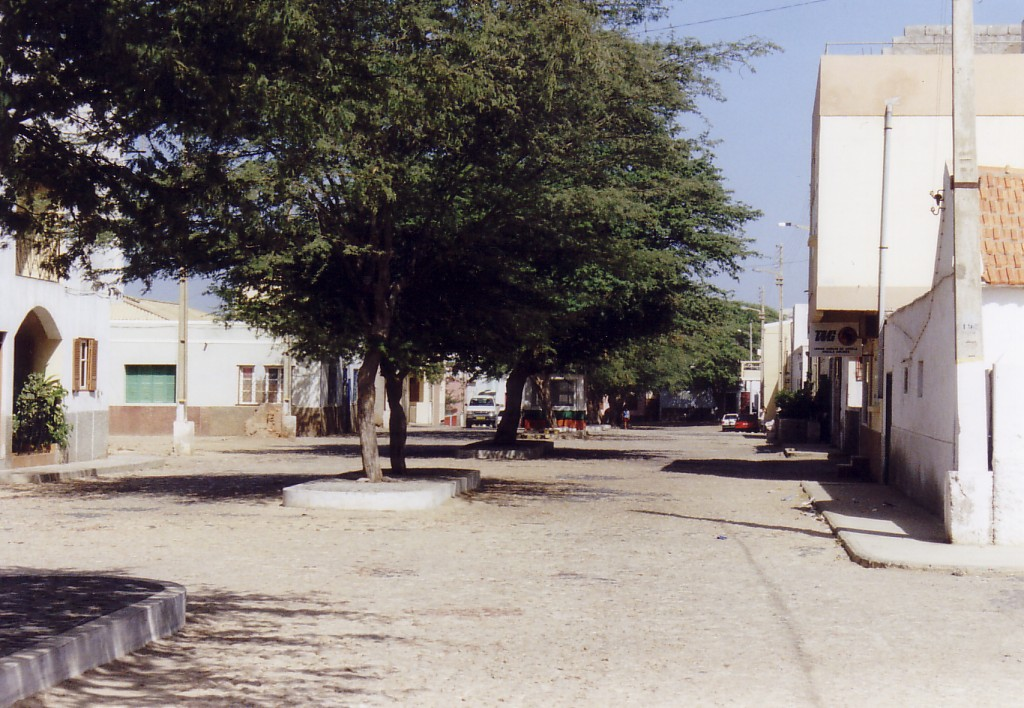
One of the streets of Espargos

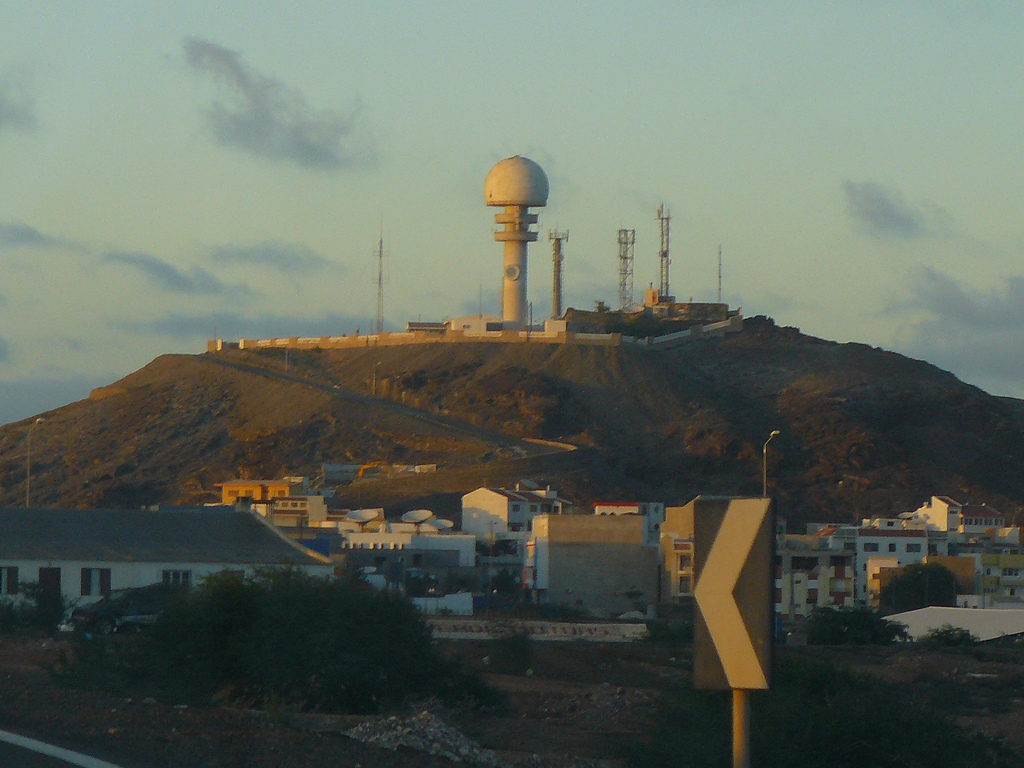
Monte Curral with its airport radar and the city

The development of Espargos started with the construction of the airport in 1939. The Italian Government of Benito Mussolini was granted authorization by the Portuguese colonial government to begin construction of a transit airport to service its flights between Europe and South America. As a consequence of World War II, the Italian involvement in the airport project ceased. In 1945 the Portuguese purchased the airport installation from the Italians and by 1949 the airport was a fully operational facility. Small houses were erected in several areas immediately adjacent to the airport. Workers from the island Sao Nicolau named the civilian area "Preguiça" after the port village on their home island. In 2010, Espargos was elevated from a town to a city.

== Demographics ==
Year	Population
1990 (Census)	5,778
2000 (Census)	5,456
2010 (Census)	17,081

== See also ==
- List of cities and towns in Cape Verde
