= List of Sporting Clube da Praia seasons =

Sporting Clube da Praia, short form: Sporting Praia (Capeverdean Crioulo, ALUPEC or ALUPEK as well as Badiu: Sporting Klubi di Praia) is a Capeverdean football club based in Praia and plays at Estádio da Várzea (sometimes in English as Várzea Stadium). The club was founded on 2 December 1923 and affiliate to the Portuguese club Sporting CP (also as Sporting Lisbon), the first made in Cape Verde and under the Portuguese rule, and played their first competitive match in early 1953.

The club has won a total of about 37 official tier-one and regional trophies, the championship titles (3 colonial, 9 national and 20 regional), 3 listed regional cup titles, 2 listed super cup titles (1 national and 1 regional) and 3 listed opening tournament titles.

Sporting Praia was the first Cape Verdean club to compete at the continentals, the greatest appearance was the First Round at the continental championships, the last was the CAF Champions League.

== Seasons ==
=== Performance in African competitions ===
Sporting Praia's results in CAF competition
Season	Competition	Qualification method	Round	Opposition	Home	Away	Aggregate
1992	African Cup of Champions Clubs	Cape Verdean champions	Preliminary Round	(Senegal) Port Autonome (Dakar)	0–0	0–0	0–0 (3–1 p.)
1992	African Cup of Champions Clubs	Cape Verdean champions	First Round	(Tunisia) Club Africain	0–0	3–1	1–3
2000	CAF Champions League	Probably second or third place in the Santiago South Zone championships	Preliminary Round	(Central African Republic) AS Tempête Mocaf	2–3	0–1	3–3 (a)
2001	CAF Cup Winners' Cup	Probably second or third place in the Santiago South Zone championships	Preliminary Round	(Chad) Gazelle FC	2–5	Withdrew^{1}	5–2 (w)
2007	CAF Champions League	Cape Verdean champions	Preliminary Round	(Guinea) Fello Star	0–1	Withdrew^{2}	1–0 (w)
2008	CAF Champions League	Cape Verdean champions	Preliminary Round	(Morocco) FAR Rabat	0–3	3–0	3–3 (5-4 p)
2008	CAF Champions League	Cape Verdean champions	First Round	(Angola) Inter Luanda	2–1	0–1	2–2 (a)
2009	CAF Champions League	Cape Verdean champions	Preliminary Round	(Morocco) FAR Rabat	0–6	1–0	1–6

^{1} Sporting Praia withdrew
^{2} Sporting Praia withdrew due to the Guinean Civil War

=== Colonial era ===
Year	Finals	Club	Result
1961	Won	GD Amarantes	Champion
1969	Won	CS Mindelense	Champion
1974	2–1	Castilho	Champion

=== National championships ===
Partial list from 1984 to 1998

Year	Stage	Opposition	Result
1977	Semifinals	Botafogo	Lost
1988	Semifinals	Boavista Praia	Won
1988	Finals	CS Mindelense	2–0
1988	Finals	CS Mindelense	0–1
1988	Finished as Finalist		

Season	Div.	Pos.	Pl.	W	D	L	GS	GA	GD	P	Notes	Playoffs
1998	1		4	-	-	-	-	-	-	-	Qualified into the final phase	
1998	1	2	3	2	0	1	7	6	+1	6	Finalist	
2002	1	1	8	6	1	1	22	4	+18	19		
2005	1A	1	5	4	1	0	24	2	+22	12	Promoted into playoffs	Finalist
2006	1B	2	5	4	0	1	8	4	+4	12	Promoted into playoffs	Champion
2007	1A	1	5	3	1	1	11	1	+10	10	Promoted into playoffs	Champion
2008	1A	1	5	4	0	1	15	3	+12	12	Promoted into playoffs	Champion
2009	1B	1	5	4	1	0	11	1	+7	12	Promoted into playoffs	Champion
2010	1B	2	5	3	2	0	16	6	+10	11	Promoted into playoffs	Finalist
2011	1A	2	5	4	0	1	7	2	+5	12	Promoted into playoffs	Finalist
2012	1A	1	5	3	2	0	15	3	+12	11	Promoted into playoffs	Champion
2013	1B	3	5	2	3	0	6	3	+3	9	Did not advance	Did not participate
2014	1A	1	5	4	1	0	7	1	+6	13	Promoted into playoffs	Semifinalist
2017	1C	1	6	4	2	0	8	1	+7	14	Advanced into the playoffs	Champion
2018	1C	2-U	6	2	2	2	5	5	0	8	Did not advance	Did not participate

2-U: A club who finished second and in the second place ranking (best of three), ranked as a non-participant in the playoff stage which the club has been eliminated from as they finished in one of the last two positions

=== Island/Regional Championships ===
Listing from 2002, up to 2002, it was the standings of the Santiago Regional Championships

Qualification into the National Championships/Division; Qualification into the national cup competition

Season	Div.	Pos.	Pl.	W	D	L	GS	GA	GD	P	Cup	Assoc. Cup	Notes
2001–02	2	1	18	12	2	4	39	19	+20	38			Promoted into the National Championships^{1}
2002–03	2	4	18	10	3	5	29	16	+13	33			
2003–04	2	2	18	12	6	0	39	10	+29	42			
2005	2	1	17	16	1	0	64	10	+54	49		Winner	Promoted into the National Championships
2005–06	2	1	18	13	4	1	47	16	+31	43			Promoted into the National Championships
2007	2	1	18	12	5	1	39	10	+29	41			Promoted into the National Championships
2007–08	2	1	18	14	2	2	45	14	+31	44	Winner		Promoted into the National Championships
2008–09	2	2	18	12	4	2	31	12	+19	40			Also promoted into the National Championships^{2}
2009–10	2	1	18	-	-	-	-	-	-	45			Promoted into the National Championships
2010–11	2	2	18	10	4	4	29	14	+15	34			Also promoted into the National Championships^{2}
2011–12	2	1	18	15	2	1	36	13	+23	47			Promoted into the National Championships
2012–13	2	1	18	15	3	0	36	13	+23	48			Promoted into the National Championships
2013–14	2	1	18	14	2	2	36	9	+27	44	Winner		Promoted into the National Championships
2014–15	2	2	18	9	7	2	26	14	+12	34			
2015–16	2	3	22	13	7	2	49	17	+32	46	Quarterfinalist		
2016–17	2	1	22	17	4	1	43	10	+33	55	Winner	Not held	Promoted into the National Championships
2017–18	2	4	22	12	5	5	39	17	+22	41	Winner	Not held	Also to be promoted in the National Championships^{2}

^{1}Promoted to the single regional championship match and then the national championships after defeating the North Zone winner Desportivo Santa Cruz
^{2}As Sporting Praia was also national champion in the previous season, the club was already promoted
