= Santiago South Super Cup =

- Founded: c. 2007
- Region: Southern Santiago, Cape Verde
- Current champions: Sporting Clube da Praia
- Most championships: Sporting Clube da Praia

The Santiago South Super Cup (Portuguese: Super Taça de Santiago Sul) is a regional super cup competition played during the season in the south of Santiago, Cape Verde consisting the municipalities of Praia, Ribeira Grande de Santiago and São Domingos. The competition is organized by the Santiago South Regional Football Association (Associação Regional de Futebol de Santiago Sul de Futebol, ARFSS). Its current champions is Sporting Praia who won their third and recent title. The regional champion competes with the cup champion. If a champion also has a cup title, a cup club who is runner-up qualifies. The upcoming edition will feature the champion Académica da Praia and the cup winner Sporting Praia.

Several cancellations occurred including in 2011, 2014, the time when Pico do Fogo on the nearby island to the west was erupting and the 2016 edition, as the cup competition took place on April 15, 2017, the super cup competition which was slanted for May or June 2017 may have been canceled.

== Winners ==
Season	Winner	Score	Runner-up
2007	Sporting Clube da Praia		Académica da Praia
2011	Not held (Note: The edition would feature the champion Boavista Praia and as Boavista Praia was also cup winners, it would feature Vitória da Praia, the second placed cup winner)		
2012	ADESBA		Sporting Praia
2013	Sporting Praia		CD Travadores
2014	Not held (Note: The edition would feature the champion Sporting Praia and as Sporting was also cup winners, it would feature Tchadense, the second placed cup winner)		
2015	Boavista Praia	1-0	Académica Praia^{1}
2016	Not held (Note: The edition would feature the champion Desportivo Praia and the cup winner Delta, it would take place somewhere around May or June 2017)		
2017	Sporting Praia	2-0	Garridos

^{1}Runner up in the cup final as the regional cup winner was also the regional champion that season

=== Performance By Club ===
Club	Winners	Winning years
Sporting Praia	3	2007, 2013, 2017
ADESBA/Bairro	1	2012
Boavista Praia	1	2015

== See also ==
- Sports in Santiago, Cape Verde
- Santiago South Cup
- Santiago South Premier Division
- Santiago South Association Cup
