= Felisberto Cardoso =

Cape Verdean football manager

Managerial career
- Years: Team
- 2008–2012: Sporting Clube da Praia
- 2014–2015: Sporting Clube da Praia

Felisberto Cardoso, nicknamed Beto, is a Cape Verdean football coach.

== Career ==
Beto was coach of Sporting Clube da Praia starting in around 2008 for a few years, he would lead his team to win the 2009 Championships and later the 2010 regional championships for the Santiago South Zone, the club that season finished as a finalist in the 2010 edition.

He was appointed interim manager of the Cape Verde national team in February 2014, alongside Men Ramires.

He was later named as acting coach in January 2016, becoming manager permanently in March 2016.

He came back to coach Sporting Praia once more from September 2014 until October 2015. His second management was not as successful as the previous as the club finished second with 34 points for the season behind Boavista FC.

== Achievements ==
As manager:

Cape Verdean Football Championships winner: 2009
Santiago South Zone Football Championships winner: 2009-10
