= Sporting–Boavista rivalry of Praia =

Football rivalry in Cape Verde

Sporting and Boavista rivalry of Praia
- Other names: Capital Derby (Derby do Capital); Praia Derby (Derby da Praia)
- Location: Praia, Santiago, Cape Verde
- Teams: Sporting Praia, Boavista Praia
- Latest meeting: Boavista Praia 2–1 Sporting Praia, February 10, 2018

The football rivalry between Sporting and Boavista FC is considered the greatest rivalry in both Cape Verde and the island of Santiago, specifically in the city of Praia. It is one of the most significant rivalries in the nation and the region, alongside the Mindelo derby (or São Vicente derby), which is also a longstanding rivalry. This rivalry is known as the Capital Derby (Derby do Capital or Clássico da Capital) and is part of the Praia Derby (Derby da Praia).

== History ==
Since the creation of the regional championships in 1953, there have been around 100 matches featuring Sporting and Boavista, as well as over 100 matches in cup competitions.

In 2010, the rivalry reached the national level in the finals and became part of the Sotavento Derby (Derby de Sotavento) or the Battle of Sotavento (Batalha de Sotavento). Boavista Praia won both matches and claimed their third title since independence.

=== Cultural rivalry ===
Both Sporting Praia and Boavista are affiliated with Lisbon.

=== Football rivalry ===
The rivalry is the third longest in Cape Verde, following the derbies of Travadores and Vitória Praia, and ahead of Académica Praia.

Sporting Praia is one of the most successful football (soccer) clubs in Cape Verde, having won approximately 41 official titles (12 national and 29 regional) compared to Boavista's 19 official titles (6 national and 13 regional). On the other hand, Sporting Praia boasts a better performance in African competitions, although no Cape Verdean team has ever won an African title. Their greatest successes include reaching the First Round of the 1992 African Cup of Champions Clubs and the 2009 CAF Champions League. Sporting Praia also appeared once in the 2001 CAF Cup Winners' Cup but did not advance beyond the preliminaries. Meanwhile, Boavista did not progress past the first round of the 1994 CAF Cup or the preliminaries of the 1996 African Cup of Champions Clubs.

=== Honours ===
Competitive honours won
Competition	Sporting	Boavista
Cape Verdean Football Championships	12	3 (1)
Cape Verdean Cup	None	2
Santiago and the Santiago South	23	7
Praia Cup	1	4
Praia Super Cup	2	1
Santiago South Zone Opening Tournament	3	1
Other	1	None

== Partial matches list ==
=== Santiago Island League (South Zone) ===
The information includes selected matches from the 2011-12 season.

	Sporting Praia – Boavista Praia			Boavista Praia – Sporting Praia		
Season	R.	Date	Score	R.	Date	Score
2011–12	16	19–04–2012	1–1	7	11–02–2012	0–0
2012–13	11	15–03–2013	3–2	2	28–12–2012	0–1
2013–14	4	14–12–2013	1–0	13	21–02–2014	1–1
2014–15	7	07–02–2015	1–1	16	10–04–2015	1–0
2015–16	9	31–01–2016	0–1	20	24–04–2016	2–2
2016–17	21	22–04–2017	1–3	10	27–01–2017	1–2
2017–18	4	25–11–2017	0–0	15	10–02–2018	2–1

=== Cape Verdean Football Championships ===
	Sporting Praia – Boavista Praia			Boavista Praia – Sporting Praia		
Season	R.	Date	Score	R.	Date	Score
2010	Finals-2nd Leg	11–07–2010	0–1	Finals-1st Leg	03–07–2010	2–0

== Head-to-Head ranking in the Santiago South Zone ==
P.	02	03	04	05	06	07	08	09	10	11	12	13	14	15	16	17	18
1																	
2																	
3																	
4																	
5																	
6																	
7																	
8																	
9																	
10																	
11																	
12																	

Key
Sporting Praia
Boavista Praia

== Men in both teams ==
- (Cape Verde) Babanco
- (Cape Verde) Blessed
- (Cape Verde) Dário Furtado
- Emanuel Temitop Jayirola
- (Cape Verde) Panduru
- (Nigeria) Matthew Mbutidem Sunday
