= AD Bairro =

- Full name: Associação Desportiva do Bairro Craveiro Lopes
- Nickname(s): Canarinha (Little Canary)
- Founded: around 1968
- Ground: Estádio da Várzea, Av. Cidade da Lisboa, Praia, Cape Verde
- Capacity: 8,000
- Chairman: Carlos Sena Teixeira
- Manager: Daniel Cardoso
- League: Santiago South Premier Division
- 2017–18: 8th
- Website: http://www.bairro.cv
Home colours	Away colours

Associação Desportiva do Bairro Craveiro Lopes, commonly known as AD Bairro or ADESBA for short, is a multisport club that had played in the Santiago Island South Zone League in Cape Verde. It is based in the capital city of Praia in the island of Santiago and plays in the stadium with a capacity of 8,000 The club never won a championship title, they have two cup titles. Its sports include football (soccer), basketball, futsal, similar to arena football and volleyball. Its current president Carlos Sena Teixeira and its manager is Daniel Cardoso who came in February 2017. Its nickname is canarinha which is Portuguese for the little canary.

== Logo ==
Its logo color has a green seal with ADESBA on top and the club's full name on the bottom with the football (soccer ball) and basketball in the middle, the sports that Bairro have.

== Uniform ==
Home uniform up to October 2016

Its uniform color is yellow with light (French) green pants and socks with three thick black stripes for home games and all light green clothing for away games. Until October 2016, its home clothing was a white t-shirt with black pants and black striped yellow socks

== History ==
The football club was created in the late 1960s and was the first club to be founded in a city neighborhood, that time, the neighborhood named after the Portuguese president Nuno Craveiro Lopes who visited the country in 1955, the neighborhood at the time was more than ten years old. The club later participated in the second division at the time was the only one until they reached the first division in 1990 and continued since 1992. Zé Piguita played for ADESBA between 1999 and 2002 and became one of the greatest players of the club.

In the 2002 season, they finished 3rd with 32 points and two seasons had nine wins. Their positions dropped to fifth a year later but scored more goals numbering 28. In 2004, they finished fourth for two seasons, four draws and scored 25 goals, first with 26 points and six wins, then with 28 points and eight wins. Bairro dropped a position to fifth in 2005 where they finished for two seasons along with their six wins, they scored 27 goals in 2006, a year later, they scored 32. Bairro finished with 32 points in 2008 for two seasons along with nine wins and five draws. In 2008, Bairro finished second. The club entered the national competition for the first time in 2008, as Sporting, also from Praia won the island championship for the year and also they won the 2007 championship, they automatically participated which gave Bairro, the second place team to participate. Bairro reached the semi-finals and challenged against Sporting Praia, they won 3–2 in the first match and scored nothing and lost at the second match. In goal totals by player, Fufuco had the most in the country with seven goals at the championships.

In 2009, Bairro finished fourth, two seasons later, their positions dropped and finished 10th with 15 wins, four wins and 11th losses and was relegated for the Second Division next season. In the 2011–12 season, Bairro was playing in the Second Division, they got first place and returned to the Premier Division where the club has played since the 2013–14 season. In recent years, ADESBA had 16 points and scored 13 goals and had 4 wins and draws and 10 losses in the 2013/14 season, in the 2014/15 season, the club had 19 points and their goal total double than last season with 26. In the 2015/16 season, the first featuring 22 matches, they had the same goal total as last season numbering 26 but their point total skyrocketed nearly doubling to 41, their seasonal wins risen from 5 to 11 and their draws doubled from 4 to 8, Bairro conceded 13 goals, more than half than last season. Their position slightly risen from 7th in 2014 to 5th in 2016 and that was it as ADESBA again finished fifth in 2017, they had scored more numbering 31 and finished with 31 points, more goals conceded numbering 33.

ADESBA started the 2017–18 Premier Division season with a won over Eugénio Lima, their next win was at the fifth round where they defeated that new entrant Tira Chapéu 3–2 and fifth at the fifth round, they hadeight points shared with Sporting Praia, ADESBA has 5 goals scored, two less than Sporting. Two losses to Praia's top five clubs followed on 16 December and were Travadores and Sporting. A win over AD Ribeira Grande was next and is the club's recent. Two more losses followed to Praia's other top five clubs Académica and Boavista with the last one, the region's worst as they lost 7–3 on 5 January. Bairro is in mid-position, 6th place with 11 points and conceded 18 goals, third worst behind the last two placed clubs Tira Chapéu and Eugênio Lima. Up next was a goal draw with Desportivo on 13 January and is currently sixth with 12 points three less than that club and one more than Travadores.

=== Cup competitions ===
At the regional cup competitions, their first was won in 1995 and their recent was in 2012. Bairro qualified into the 4th Cape Verdean Cup in 2012, the recent edition and lost in one of the rounds. Later Bairro participated in the 2012 Super Cup, qualified as cup winner, they challenged Sporting Praia and after winning in the penalty shootouts, Bairro won their recent super cup title.

Bairro's recent cup competitions met twice with their nearby club Celtic da Praia, they would lose to that club, both at the 1/8 finals (or the second round) and also where Bairro started, first in 2016 with a 2–0 result to Celtic, then in 2017. only in the penalty shootouts with the result 8–7 to that club after the match had not a single goal scored.

== Stadium ==
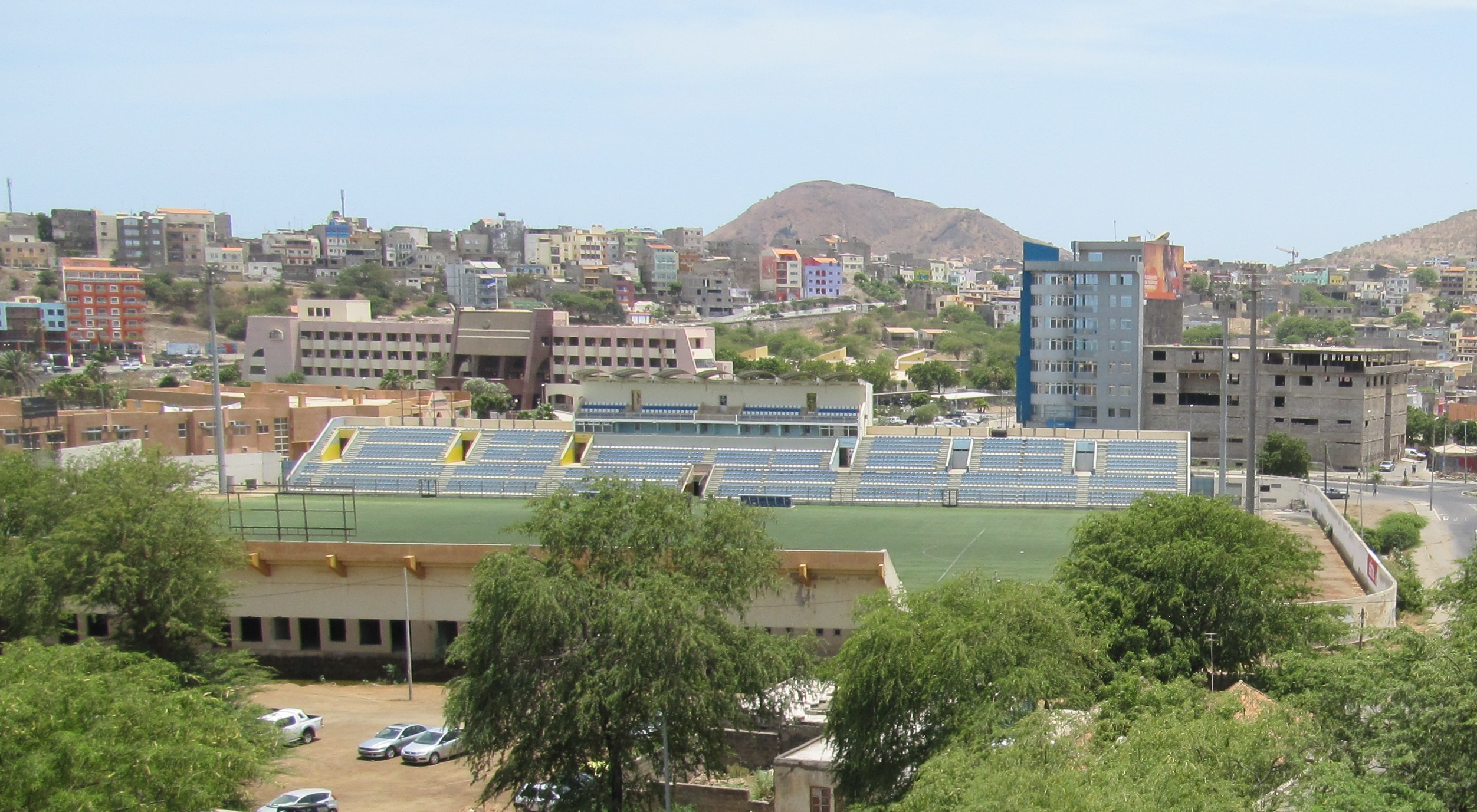
Estádio da Várzea, second home of ADESBA

ADESBA's home field is at Sucupira, the closest field to the neighborhood and its next to it. Due to its field size, ADESBA plays at Estádio da Várzea, a multi-use stadium in Praia, Cape Verde. It is currently used mostly for football matches. The stadium holds 8,000. The stadium has seat rows in the left and right sides and a small hill and a plateau lies to the west.

It is played along with Praia's three other famous teams including Sporting Praia, Boavista, Académica and CD Travadores in the same stadium. The club practices also at the stadium and rarely at the other stadium which includes Craveiro Lopes, probably Calabaceira or Sucupira in the north.

== Honours ==
- Santiago South (Praia) Cup: 2

1995, 2011/12

- Santiago South Super Cup: 1

2011/12

=== Secondary honours ===
- Santiago South Zone Second Division: 1 listed

2011/12

== League and cup history ==
=== National championship ===
Season	Div.	Pos.	Pl.	W	D	L	GS	GA	GD	P	Notes	Playoffs
2008	1B	2	5	2	2	1	12	5	+7	8	Promoted into playoffs	3rd
Total:			5	2	2	1	12	5	+7	8		

=== Island/Regional Championship ===
Season	Div.	Pos.	Pl.	W	D	L	GS	GA	GD	P	Cup	Tour	Notes
2002	2	3	18	9	5	4	24	21	+3	32			
2002–03	2	5	18	9	3	6	28	26	+2	30			
2003–04	2	4	18	6	4	8	25	28	-3	25			
2005	2	4	16	8	4	4	25	16	+9	28			
2005–06	2	5	17	6	4	7	17	18	-1	22			
2006–07	2	5	18	6	6	6	27	28	-1	24			
2007–08	2	2	18	9	5	4	34	26	+8	32			Also promoted into the National Championships
2008–09	2	4	18	9	5	4	30	16	+14	32			
2010–11	2	10	18	4	3	11	12	29	-17	15			Relegated into the regional Second Division
2011–12	3	1	18	-	-	-	-	-	-	-	Winner		Promoted into the regional Premier Division
2012–13	2	7	18	4	6	8	19	21	-2	18			
2013–14	2	7	18	4	4	10	13	23	-10	16			
2014–15	2	6	18	5	4	9	26	28	-2	19			
2015–16	2	5	22	11	8	3	26	13	+13	41			
2016–17	2	5	22	9	4	9	31	33	-2	31	Round of 8		
2017–18	2	8	22	7	5	10	23	38	-15	26	Round of 8		

== Statistics ==
- Best position: 3rd (overall, national)
- Appearance in a regional super cup competition: Once, in 2012
- Total wins: 3 (national)
- Total goals scored: 15 (national)
- Total points: 8 (national)
- Highest number of matches played in a season: 22 (regional)
- Highest number of points in a season: 41 (regional)

== Players ==
=== Current squad ===
As of 12 December 2016

Note: Flags indicate national team as defined under FIFA eligibility rules; some limited exceptions apply. Players may hold more than one non-FIFA nationality.

No.	Pos.	Nation	Player
—		(Cape Verde) CPV	Bruno Xavier F. Gonçalves
—		(Cape Verde) CPV	Jordy Antony F. Gomes (Note: also known as Djordy or Djordi)
—			Bruno Manuel M. levy
—		(Cape Verde) CPV	Milton Cunha
—		(Cape Verde) CPV	Walter Fernandes

== Chairmen history ==
- (Cape Verde) Guto (Fernando Augusto Fernandes Ribeiro) – until October 2016
- (Cape Verde) Carlos Sena Teixeira – since February 2017

== Managerial history ==
- (Cape Verde) Cley – October 2016 – February 2017
- (Cape Verde) Daniel Cardoso – since February 2017

== See also ==
- AD Bairro's basketball team
