= Desportivo da Praia =

Football club in Cape Verde

Desportivo Praia
- Full name: Desportivo da Praia
- Nickname: militares (troops)
- Founded: 1979
- Ground: Av. Cidade da Lisboa; Estádio da Varzea, Praia, Cape Verde
- Capacity: 8,000
- Chairman: Jorge Martins Andrade
- Manager: Kuko
- League: Santiago South Premier Division
- 2017–18: 7th
- Website: http://www.fa.gov.cv/index.php/desportivo-da-praia-futebol
Home colours	Away colours

Desportivo da Praia is a football club that currently plays in the Premier division and the Santiago Island League (South) in Cape Verde. It is based in the capital city of Praia in the island of Santiago. It is the military team of Cape Verde. Its nickname is militares. The team won the first and only regional opening tournament in 2014.

Its logo has a blue circle with the acronym GDCP in the middle and a large D on the right and the club name on the right. Its uniform color features a blue clothing with a T-shirt with white stripes in the middle for home games and a white T-shirt with the remainder blue for away games.

== History ==
The club was founded in 1979 by the Cape Verdean Armed Forces.

Their appearance into the national competition was in 1990 and advanced up to the finals and faced CS Mindelense and lost two matches, this was their greatest position.

In 2004, Desportivo da Praia celebrated its 25th anniversary of its foundation.

On December 16, 2011, the third round of the season, Desportivo defeated Varanda 7–0 and made it the region's highest result of the season, also in that season, 46 goals were scored, the region's highest ahead of Sporting Praia. Desportivo finished as runner up to Sporting with 41 points and failing to qualify into the nationals. As Sporting Praia won the 2012 title and would win another regional title, team again entered the national division in 2013 as runner up in the Santiago Island League South. Desportivo won their second regional title in 26 years, their first since the breakup for the South Zone, the club finished with a record 47 points and scored 43 goals, the points record is shared with Sporting's 2013 total and is behind Sporting's 2012 total of 48 and 2005 total of 49 in the region, it is also one of the highest of any island leagues in Cape Verde. Their next was their third appearance and was placed in Group A, their first match was a second round which ended in a scoreless draw with CD Sinagoga from Santo Antão North, on June 1, they played their rescheduled first round match with the champion from the north of the island Varandinha from Tarrafal, they lost 1–3 in their last meeting with the club from two parts of the island even at the nationals, their last match ended in a 2–1 win over Sporting Brava. Desportivo finished third with 7 points and with two wins and losses and a draw, scored 7 goals. For the first time, the club also heads to the regional super cup in late 2016. Desportivo qualified into the 2015–16 Super Cup, as the Boavista-Delta cup final was not played in May 2016, the match was rescheduled for April 15, 2017, Desportivo will face the cup winner Delta in the rescheduled 2016 regional super cup as early as May 2017.

Again in three seasons, the club finished third for the 2016–17 season. During the season, they were first place from rounds two to three, lost it and later was second from rounds 10 to 12, a draw with Travadores at the 13th round dropped it to third and kept it for the remainder of the season with the exceptions of the 15th and 17th rounds where they were fourth. Desportivo had 46 points, shy of their total of the previous season, they had 44 goals scored, a goal higher and ranked second ahead of Sporting Praia's.

Desportivo da Praia played in the friendly competition, the local GAFT Cup of Tarrafal Municipality, one of the first six outside the municipality to play, the club played up to the finals and lost to Benfica de Santa Cruz and the title.

Desportivo Praia started the regional 2017–18 season with two straight losses before they made a win over the newcomer Tira Chapéu on November 17, another was made over the historically mighty Travadores a week later. A draw with almighty Sporting was followed. On December 10, they defeated AD Ribeira Grande before a loss to Académica was made. Their December 23 match with Boavista was delayed due to no referees appeared in the match, rescheduled for January 9, they lost 3–1. Desportivo made another win on December 20 over Benfica, then a two-goal draw with Eugénio Lima was made at the fifth day of 2018 in January. Recently Desportivo made a goal draw with ADESBA and is fifth with 15 points, three ahead of ADESBA and nine less than almighty Sporting. Desportivo failed to make another win as they lost again to Tchadense, this time with the score 2–1, the club's fifth of the season but is still fifth, with 11 points behind fourth placed Sporting. Another draw was next with a goal made with Celtic. Desportivo now has 16 points, shared alongside Tchadense, Ribeira Grande and ADESBA though their position dropped to 7th as they scored 13 goals. A round later, win number four came to Desportivo and made it the club's highest scoring match (third overall in Santiago South) of the season with the score 0–5 over newcomer Tira Chapéu and returned the 5th position to Desportivo and had 18 goals scored in total, a second straight win (fifth win of the season) was made on February 10 over CD Travadores who once had their successful seasons up to the late 2010s and has 22 points, now six less than Sporting's and scored more than 20 goals.

== Stadium ==
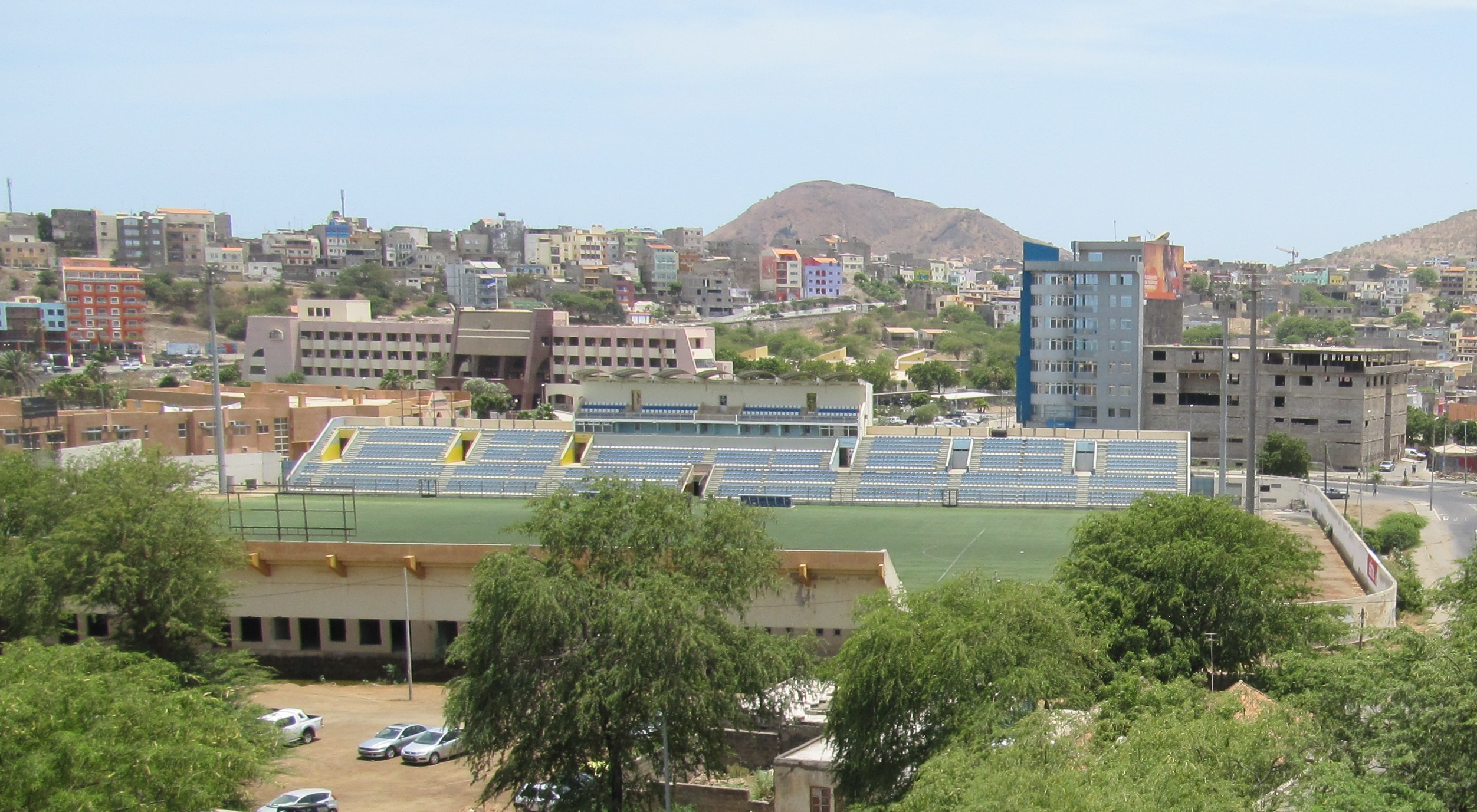
Estádio da Várzea, the home field of Desportivo Praia

Estádio da Várzea is a multi-use stadium in Praia, Cape Verde. It is currently used mostly for football matches. The stadium holds 8,000. The stadium has seat rows in the left and right sides and a small hill and a plateau lies to the west.

It is played along with Praia's three other famous teams including Sporting Praia, Boavista, Académica and CD Travadores in the same stadium. The club practices also at the stadium.

== Rivalry ==
The club's only rivalry is with Travadores.

== Honours ==
- Regional Championships: 2
  - Santiago Island Championships: 1

1990

  - Santiago South Premier Division: 1

2016

- Santiago South (Praia) Opening Tournament: 2

2014, 2015

== League and cup history ==
=== National championship ===
Season	Div.	Pos.	Pl.	W	D	L	GS	GA	GD	P	Notes	Playoffs
2013	1B	3	5	2	3	0	6	3	+3	9		Semi-finalist
2016	1A	3	5	2	1	2	7	6	+1	7		

=== Island/Regional Championship ===
Season	Div.	Pos.	Pl.	W	D	L	GS	GA	GD	P	Cup	Tour	Notes
2001–02	2	6	18	5	8	5	23	12	+11	23			
2002–03	2	6	18	5	5	8	23	27	-4	20			
2003–04	2	5	18	7	4	7	31	30	+1	25			
2005	2	8	17	4	3	10	10	26	-16	15			
2005–06	2	6	16	5	3	8	19	25	-6	18			
2006–07	2	7	18	5	5	8	23	36	-13	20			
2007–08	2	6	18	7	4	7	22	26	-4	25			
2008–09	2	7	18	2	7	9	10	26	-16	13			
2010–11	2	4	18	9	2	7	20	18	+2	29			
2011–12	2	2	18	13	2	3	46	15	+31	41			
2012–13	2	2	18	8	8	2	28	13	+15	32			Also promoted into the National Championships
2013–14	2	3	18	10	6	2	37	17	+20	36		Winner	
2014–15	2	3	18	9	6	3	37	20	+17	33		Winner	
2015–16	2	1	22	14	5	3	43	12	+30	47			Promoted into the National Championships
2016–17	2	3	22	14	4	4	44	18	+26	46	1st round	Not held	
2017–18	2	7	22	7	5	10	27	30	-3	26	1st round	Not held	

== Statistics ==
- Best position: 3rd (national, group stage)
- Best position at an opening tournament: 1st
- Number of appearances in the national competition: 3
- Number of appearances in a regional super cup competition: to be the only appearance
- Highest number of points in a season:
  - Regional: 47, in 2016
  - National: 7, in 2016
- Highest number of goals scored in a season: 43 (regional), in 2016
- Highest number of matches played in a season:
  - Regional and national: 27, in 2016
  - Regional only: 22, one season, in 2016
- Most goals scored by season: Ró (16) in 2017
- Lowest number of points in a season: 7 (national), in 2016
- Highest number of goals conceded in a season: 6 (national), in 2016
- Highest number of matches lost in a season: 2 (national), in 2016
- Total number of points: 15 (national)

Other:

- Appearance at the GAFT Cup: Once, in 2017

== Players ==
=== Current squad ===
As of December 12, 2016

Note: Flags indicate national team as defined under FIFA eligibility rules; some limited exceptions apply. Players may hold more than one non-FIFA nationality.

No.	Pos.	Nation	Player
—			José Edlly Soares de Carvalho
—		CPV	Euclides T. Monteiro
—	FW	CPV	Ro (Óscar Romário Lopes Vaz)
—		CPV	Silvério o Rosário Sanches Lopes
—		CPV	Walter Patrick M. Tavares
—			Wilson Patrick Tavares

== Other sports ==
Desportivo Praia also has a men's handball team.
