= Estádio da Várzea =

Sports stadium in Praia, Cape Verde

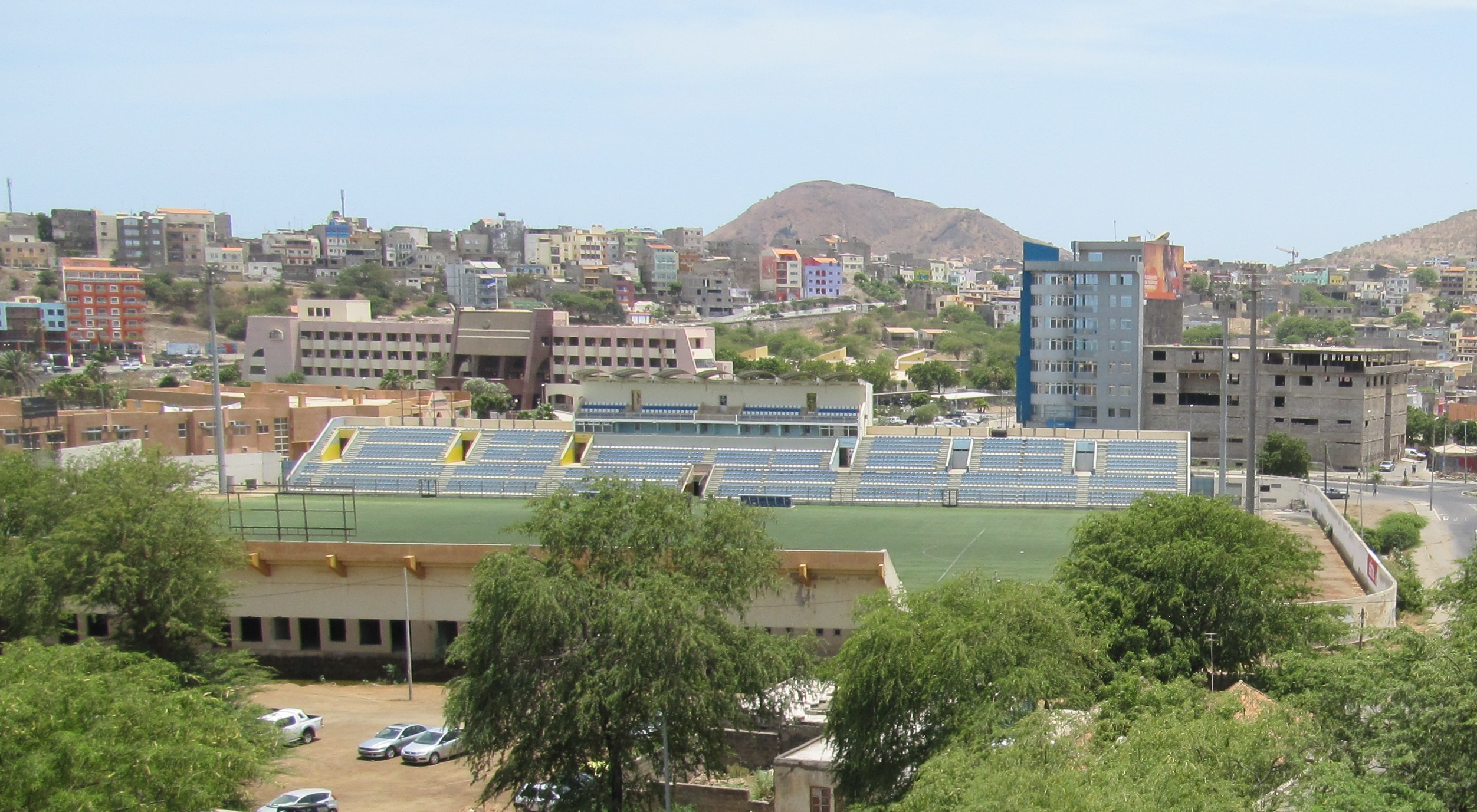

- Location within Cape Verde
- Location: Avenida Cidade de Lisboa; Praia, Santiago, Cape Verde
- Coordinates: 14.9161°N 23.5121°W
- Owner: Câmara Municipal da Praia
- Operator: ARFSS (Santiago South Regional Football Association)
- Capacity: 8,000

Construction
- Opened: 2006

Tenants
- Académica da Praia; ADESBA; Benfica da Praia; Boavista FC; Desportivo da Praia; Sporting Clube da Praia; CD Travadores; Vitória FC da Praia

Estádio da Várzea is a multi-purpose stadium in Praia, Cape Verde, just west of Plateau, the city center, in the subdivision of Várzea and on Avenida Cidade de Lisboa on its east side. It is currently used mostly for football matches. The stadium holds 8,000 people. The stadium is owned by the city of Praia and is operated by the Santiago South Regional Football Association and serves its headquarters of the association. The other stadium operated by the association in the south of the island is Calabaceira.

The entrance is on the west side of the stadium, where most of the seating is. The stadium has seat rows in the left and right sides, 200 meters east is Plateau, the city center. Its size is 108 by 69 meters, the longest part of the field goes north to south with a 15-degree angle facing east at the top. Its elevation is about 4 meters above sea level. A smaller practice field lies due south.

The stadium is the home of some of the best football clubs in Cabo Verde: Sporting Praia, CD Travadores, Académica and Boavista FC from the Santiago Island first division. League games often take place in front of dozens of spectators. Vitória FC, Desportivo da Praia and Benfica Praia also use the venue for home games. Other clubs that base in another part include ADESBA located in the nearby neighborhood of Craveiro Lopes some hundreds of meters north but play in the stadium.

The front entrance into the stadium on avenida Cidade de Lisboa

== Competition ==
The regional Premier Division matches are played in the afternoon and the early evening hours starting, on Fridays, its matches starts at 16:00 (4 PM) and during the weekends its matches starts at 14:00 (2 PM). Four regional Second Division matches are played in the morning hours starting at 8:00 (8 AM), the other match are played at nearby Calabaceira further northwest.

== Training ground ==
Southwest of the stadium is a small training ground. The clubs mainly train at that part of the stadium, some like Sporting Praia, Travadores, Académca da Praia, Desportivo Praia, ADESBA and Celtic Praia train there. The size is 69 x 43 meters. It was built on a former concrete basketball court in 2004.

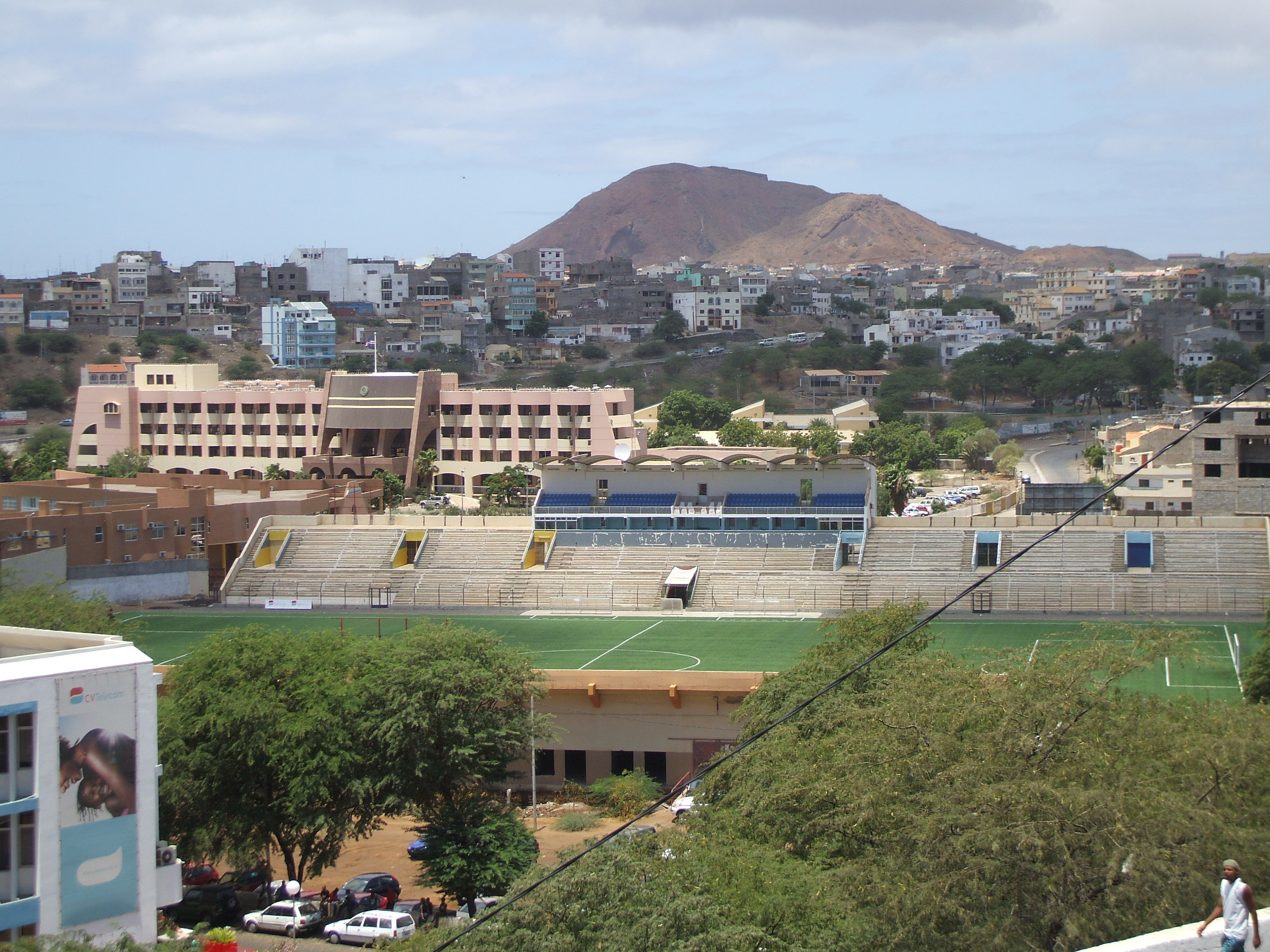
The stadium in 2007 with the view of Monte Vermelho

== Other landmarks ==
Other landmarks around the stadium includes the National Library in the north, the government building, home of the National Assembly in the south and recently since 2013, the stock market building. Further east is the headquarters of Cabo Verde Telecom, a building south is Cape Verde's tallest building built in around 2010, it is used for finances, banking and investments.

Other nearby sports complexes are its tennis complex and Gimnodesportivo Vava Duarte about two buildings south.

== History ==
The stadium (then commonly as Estádio Municipal da Praia) was constructed around the mid-20th century.

From 1953 to 2002, the stadium was solely operated by the Santiago Regional Football Association before its breakup into two zones.

On February 5, 2004, the management of the stadium was done by the Santiago South Regional Football Association, newly separated then, while the ownership remains to be the city itself. Currently the ARFSS is the operator of the stadium, they also operate Calabaceira and a part of its training grounds in other parts of the city.

The stadium was reopened in 2006, Campo de Coco formerly occupied the site until the area would be renovated. Campo do Coco was one of the first football (soccer) fields opened in around 1930, around the 1990s, the stadium name became Várzea.

The stadium twice hosted the Amilcar Cabral Cup, the first was in 1982 which it also canceled the national championships that season but not the first national cup, and the last one was in 2000 where the team defeated Senegal 1-0 and won the only title. In 1998, the field started to deteriorate, one of the reasons that the Santiago regional competitions were cancelled for the 1999 and the 2001 seasons, it was restored briefly in 2000. Another reason of the deterioration was that in the 1980s and the 1990s, more matches were played especially the Second Division at the stadium with an addition of a few clubs. The stadium underwent renovations for November 1999, heavy rains delayed renovations and was not completed until April in the following year. Later, Praia's clubs between 2001 and 2004 were played at Sucupira, weeds were grown inside the stadium, the stadium was being renovated and the field sorted again at the time. The adjacent Sucupira field became disused, a building is now built on the former field. On March 15, 2007, the field became artificial and synthetic turf. Before, the grass was dry and in bad shape due to the climate that is not favorable for natural grass, the replacement costed about CV$60 million (545,000 euros). Music concerts also took place in the stadium especially in February 2007. The first Cape Verdean Cup final took place in September 2007 which was won by Académica Praia. More improvements along with artificial grass were made in late 2010 and artificial light were added.

With the improved 2017 national season, the first with two meetings each, 3 out of 6 matches were at the stadium and had three consecutive matches played, the 2nd, 3rd and the 4th rounds.

=== Cape Verdean Colonial/Provincial Championships ===
The final matches between the winners of the islands of Santiago and São Vicente before independence in 1975 took place at Campo do Coco, one of them was in 1972, the predecessor to Várzea, they were held each year with the exceptions of 1955, 1957 to 1959 and in 1970.

=== Cape Verdean Football Championships ===
Several final matches of the Cape Verdean Football Championships took place in the stadium, one of two finals matches featuring a club from Santiago or outside the island of São Vicente took place at the stadium until 1985. Four of its matches was held at Sucupira while the stadium was being repaired, Sporting Praia won their fourth title at the stadium in 2002 with a record total of 19 points and scored 22 goals. The 2004 final took place in the stadium with the first match of two where Academica lost to Sport Sal Rei Club 0–2 on June 26, 2004. The first of two match of the 2005 finals was in the stadium with FC Derby and ended in a one-goal draw, Derby later won their third and recent title for the club. In 2006, the second final match took place on July 2 and Sporting was tied with Académico do Aeroporto with two goals, Sporting won their fifth title, their first of four consecutive titles. In 2007, the second match was at the stadium on July 21 and had a one-goal draw with Académica do Mindelo and Sporting claimed their sixth title under the away goals rule. Sporting faced Derby in the 2008 finals, the second rescheduled match featured Sporting who defeated Derby with 3 goals and claimed their seventh title. The 2009 finals was the first in the country that featured two clubs from the same city, the clubs were Sporting and Académica da Praia and Sporting won all four consecutive titles. Again, the 2009 finals would feature clubs from the same city, Boavista FC defeated Sporting Praia in two of its final matches and claimed their third and recent title for the club. The 2011 edition of the finals had its first match held at the stadium and the first with artificial grass, Sporting played against CS Mindelense and lost the match by a goal, later Mindelense won their eighth title. In the 2012 finals, Sporting challenged against SC Atlético in the second match and ended scoreless, Sporting under the away goals rule claimed their ninth and recent title for the club, one of the notable finals of the decade. The 2017 national football championship finals had the second leg took place in the stadium, the next in five years where Sporting Praia won their recent title, also its long-awaited celebrations made by Sporting Praia fans took place at the stadium. The 2018 National Division has the first three of the six matches with Académica Praia in the stadium while Sporting played its first match in the stadium and will play the last six inside Várzea.

=== Cape Verdean Cup ===
The knockout stage of the Cape Verdean Cup took place at the stadium in 1982, 2007, 2009, 2010 and in 2012. The 2007 season had all matches played and the final round with three matches in 2010. No new national cup competitions have been made until 2018, where the third round matches will be playing in June.

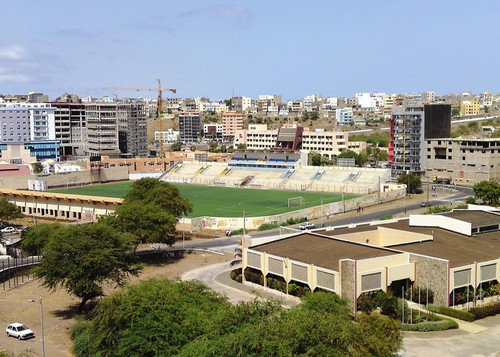
The stadium in 2010 with the view of Achada de Santo António and Tira Chapéu. Below on the bottom right is the National Library

=== Clubs at the continental level ===
African championship and cup league competitions took place at the stadium, seven championship editions took place with eleven matches and three cup competitions with three matches.

In the championship portion, Sporting held the most with seven matches the latter five being the CAF Champions League with ASC Port Autonome and Tunisia's Club Africain in the 1992 African Cup of Champions Clubs which was the first Cape Verdean club to appear, in the 2000 CAF Champions League with AS Tempête Mocaf of Bangui, Guinea's Fello Star in 2007, FAR Rabat and Inter Luanda in 2008 and again with FAR Rabat in 2009, the 2009 edition was the recent that the Cape Verdean champion competed at the continental level. The other two are Travadores with two matches held, first in the 1995 African Cup of Champions Clubs with Real de Banjul and the 1997 CAF Champions League with USM Alger and Boavista in 1996 African Cup of Champions Clubs.

In the cup portion each of the three clubs held it once, Travadores was the first Cape Verdean club to compete at the continental competition in 1993 where Boavista lost to ASC Air Mauritanie, then Boavista in 1994 with Diamond Stars from Sierra Leone and lastly Sporting held it once in 2001 with Gazelle FC from N'Djamena, Chad.

== Architecture ==
The architectural type is early modernism. The exterior of the architecture at the front is colored stucco-peach, it has eight modernized square columns, on the bottom inside are colored white where the entrance gates are and the offices are located. In the middle is colored light brown with two flaw windows on its edges with four in the middle at the upper third floor, a circular window at the second floor is in the middle, it is bordered by two balconies at the third floor and bordering it are two thick glass staircase windows with three small squared windows each side on its two upper floors.

== Panoramics ==
The stadium can be viewed from the hills in the outskirts including Achada Santo António and especially the Plateau of Praia.

== Transportation ==
Two nearby bus stops are located by the stadium. One is at Avenida Cidade de Lisboa to the south and another is on the old road between the city center and Cidade Velha. These stops are also served by minibuses and taxis. Bus lines of the city's transit system that is nearby the stadium include:

- São Filipe – Plateau - Achada Santo António (sometimes)
- Palmarejo - Plateau – Achada Grande [Line 2] (sometimes)
- São Filipe – Plateau - Achada Santo António - second route
- Palmarejo – Plateau – Eugénio Lima
- Terra Branca – Plateau – Pensamento (sometimes)

== See also ==
- List of football stadiums in Cape Verde
- List of buildings and structures in Santiago, Cape Verde
- Santiago South Regional Football Association
- Santiago South Premier Division
- Santiago South Second Division - most matches takes place at the stadium
