= Complexo Desportivo Adega =

Sports stadium on Santiago Island, Cape Verde

- Location within Cape Verde
- Location: Caminho de Adega; Achada Grande Tras, Praia, Santiago Island, Cape Verde
- Coordinates: 14.9262°N 23.4883°W
- Owner: Câmara Municipal da Praia

Construction
- Opened: 2012

Tenants
- Football clubs (training): Boavista FC (Cape Verde); Sporting Clube da Praia; Athletics: Travadores

Complexo Desportivo Adega is a multi-purpose stadium in the Achada Grande Trás section of Praia, Cape Verde. It is currently used mostly for football matches and athletics competitions, much of the football (soccer) training are used for practices. It is 100 metres (330 ft) long and 64 metres (210 ft) wide. It is the home base of several athletic clubs playing at the regional level.

Its location is in the east of the island just a kilometer north of the country's busiest port and is connected with the circular bypass that also connects with the road to Assomada and Cidade Velha.

Several football (soccer) clubs including Boavista and Sporting Praia practices at the complex, before the soccer matches.

Athletic competitions take places at the complex, the Santiago South Zone Athletic Championships takes places each season. One of the teams include Travadores participating at the complex.

== See also ==
- List of buildings and structures in Santiago, Cape Verde
