= Piguita =

Cape Verdean retired footballer

Personal information
- Full name: Carlos Ilídio Moreno Gomes
- Date of birth: 7 December 1970 (age 55)
- Place of birth: Praia, Cape Verde
- Height: 1.85 m (6 ft 1 in)
- Position: Centre back

Senior career*
Years	Team	Apps	(Gls)
1992–1993	Sporting Praia		
1993–1994	Famalicão	11	(1)
1994–1995	Beira-Mar	16	(0)
1995–1996	Portimonense	26	(0)
1996–2007	Covilhã	276	(19)
2007–2008	Lusitânia	16	(1)
2008–2009	Unhais	7	(2)
2009	Alcains	3	(1)
2009–2010	Penamacorense	5	(1)
Total		360	(25)
- * Club domestic league appearances and goals

Carlos Ilídio Moreno Gomes (born 7 December 1970), known as Piguita, is a Cape Verdean retired footballer who played as a central defender.

== Club career ==
Piguita was born in Praia. He arrived in Portugal at the age of 22 from Sporting Clube da Praia, suffering two consecutive Primeira Liga relegations with F.C. Famalicão and S.C. Beira-Mar.

After one year in the third division with Portimonense SC, Piguita signed for S.C. Covilhã in the second level. He went on to remain with the club for 11 years, appearing in nearly 300 competitive matches and achieving three promotions to division two.

Piguita retired at nearly 40, after three seasons with four teams in Portuguese amateur football.
