= Vargas Fernandes =

Cape Verdean footballer (born 1977)

Personal information
- Full name: Eduardo Moreira Fernandes
- Date of birth: 21 August 1977 (age 49)
- Place of birth: Praia, Cape Verde
- Height: 1.75 m (5 ft 9 in)
- Position: Midfielder

Senior career*
Years	Team	Apps	(Gls)
1997–2000	Sporting Clube da Praia		
2000	Gil Vicente	0	(0)
2001–2002	Lusitânia	21	(1)
2002–2003	Avanca		
2003–2004	Fazendense		
2004–2005	Alverca	32	(2)
2005	PP-70	7	(2)
2006	Moreirense	16	(2)
2006–2007	Portimonense	23	(1)
2007–2008	Gondomar	8	(0)
2008–2009	Oliveirense	26	(0)
2009–2010	Standard Sumgayit	8	(0)
2010–2015	Sporting Clube da Praia		

International career
2007	Cape Verde	3	(0)
- * Club domestic league appearances and goals

Eduardo Moreira Fernandes (born August 21, 1977), better known as Vargas Fernandes is a Capeverdean footballer who played as a midfielder.

== Career ==
His first club was Sporting Clube da Praia in his native country, he would lead to win the 1998 regionals. In 2000, he played in Portugal, starting in Gil Vicente in the Portuguese SuperLiga. He played as a midfielder there with different clubs, in the 2004-05 season, he played with FC Alverca which was in the lower Liga de Honra (Honour League). With the club, Vargas Fernandes reached in the second tier Segunda Liga, but released him due to financial problems. He was one of the first Capeverdeans to play with a Finnish club up north in Tampere and played with Tampereen Peli-Pojat-70 which was in the Second Division, he scored two goals, a season later he spend the next four seasons in Portugal, after his return, he played in Moreirense, Portimonense, Gondomar and Olvieirense, of the goals he scored, he only scored a goal with Portimonense, each in the Segunda Liga. In 2009, he became the first Capeverdean to play with an Azeri club, Standard Sumgayit, early in the season, Valdas Ivanauskas was coach. After the end of the season, the club was eleventh and was relegated into the national Second Division, he scored not a single goal there. Vargas returned to his home country to play with Sporting Clube da Praia in 2010 for the next five seasons, he would become one of the oldest players in the club that played. During that time, his achievement was the 2012 national championships, the club's ninth and recent title. His next two successes were regional titles won in 2013 and 2014.

== Career statistics ==
=== International ===
Cape Verde national team
Year	Apps	Goals
2007	3	0
Total	3	0

Statistics accurate as of match played 9 September 2007
