= Fock (footballer) =

Cape Verdean footballer (born 1982)

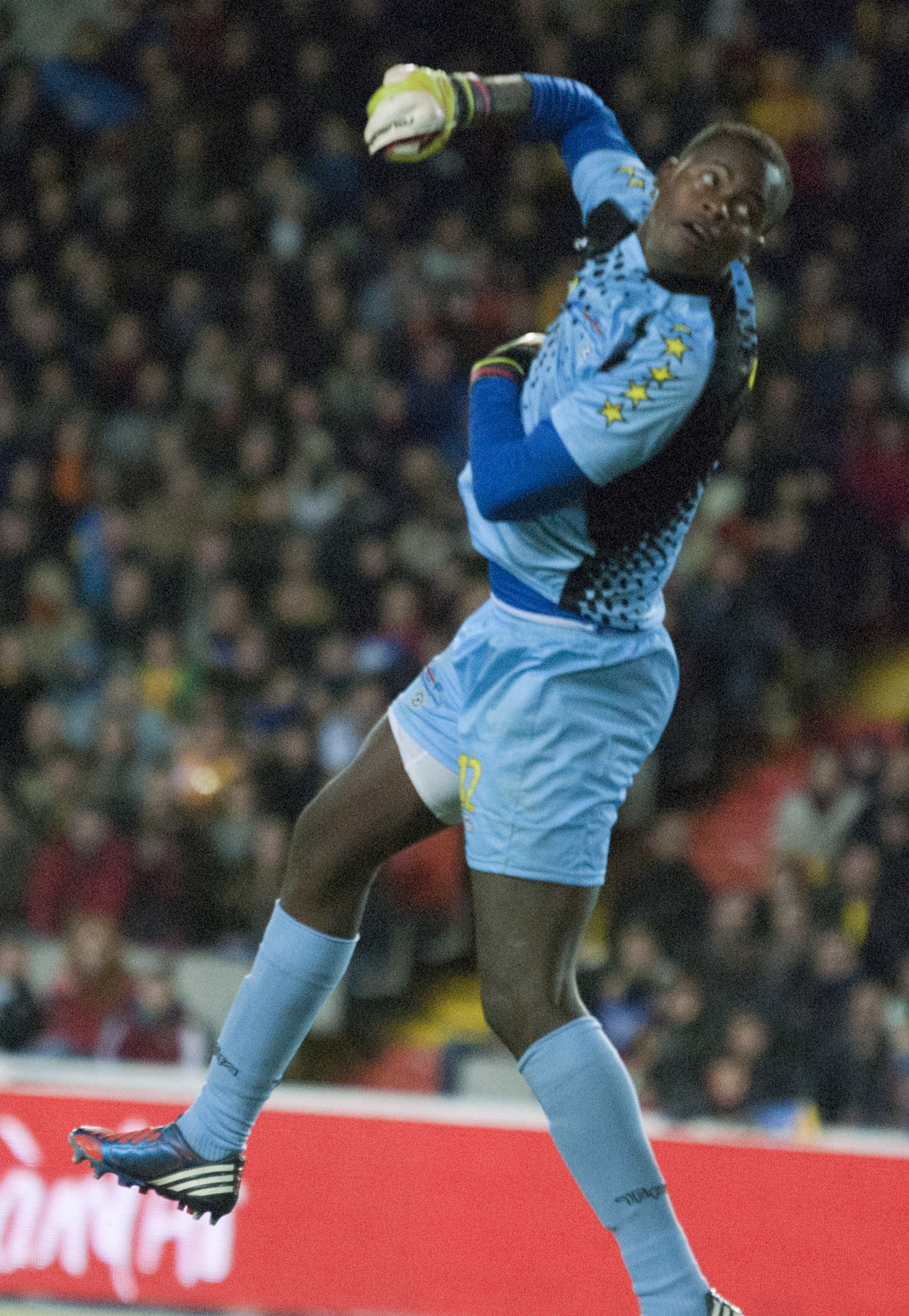
- Fock in action for Cape Verde in 2013

Personal information
- Full name: Fredson Jorge Ramos Tavares
- Date of birth: 25 July 1982 (age 44)
- Place of birth: São Vicente, Cape Verde
- Height: 1.88 m (6 ft 2 in)
- Position: Goalkeeper

Team information
- Current team: Batuque

Youth career
- 1990–2001: Real Júnior

Senior career*
Years	Team	Apps	(Gls)
2002–2003	Real Júnior		
2004–2007	Sporting Praia	69	(0)
2008–2010	Mindelense	26	(0)
2010–2011	Ceuta	26	(0)
2011–2012	Batuque		
2012	Petro Atlético		
2013	Batuque		
2014–2015	Caála	21	(0)
2015	Benfica Luanda	1	(0)
2016–	Batuque		

International career^{‡}
2009–2013	Cape Verde	12	(0)
- * Club domestic league appearances and goals as of 10 September 2017 ‡ National team caps and goals as of 9 January 2013

Fredson Jorge Ramos Tavares (born 25 July 1982), known as Fock, is a Cape Verdean footballer who plays for Batuque FC as a goalkeeper.

== Club career ==
Born in São Vicente, Fock started playing for Real Júnior Tarrafal, Sporting Clube da Praia and CS Mindelense. In 2010, he had his first experience abroad, joining a host of compatriots at AD Ceuta in the Spanish third division and being the most utilised player in his position in his first and only season.

Fock returned to his country in 2011, going on to spend two years with Batuque FC.

== International career ==
Fock won his first cap for Cape Verde in 2009. On 24 May of the following year he appeared in a friendly in Covilhã with Portugal – who was preparing for the 2010 FIFA World Cup in South Africa – playing the entire match as the minnows (ranked 117th) managed a 0–0 draw.
