= Sporting Clube da Praia =

- Full name: Sporting Clube da Praia
- Nickname(s): Leões (Lions); Verde-e-Amarelos (Green'n'Yellow); Lion di Kapital (Lion of the Capital, Portuguese: Leão de Capital)
- Founded: 2 December 1923
- Ground: Estádio da Várzea, Praia, Cape Verde
- Capacity: 8,000
- Chairman: Carlos Daniel Caetano
- Manager: Lito
- League: Santiago Island League (South); Cape Verdean Football Championships
- 2017–18 2018: 1st, Champions; 2nd and eliminated
- Website: www.scp.cv
Home colours	Away colours

Sporting Clube da Praia, short form: Sporting Praia (Capeverdean Crioulo, ALUPEC or ALUPEK as well as Badiu: Sporting Klubi di Praia) is a professional football club that plays in the Santiago South Premier Division in Cape Verde. It is based in the capital city of Praia in the island of Santiago, one of the unrelegated clubs in the south of the island along with three of the city's four historically mightiest clubs including Académica, Boavista and CD Travadores. Along with Académcia, Boavista, Desportivo, Travadores and Vitória, it is one of several teams that share the same ground, Estádio da Várzea, which has a capacity of 8,000. SCP regularly play home games in front of hundreds of spectators. Sporting has won six championships since independence and a few before independence. The first title was won in the summer of 1962 before independence. Sporting recently won the 2017 national title. Its current president is Carlos Daniel Caetano and its manager is Lito, who once played for Portuguese clubs as footballer.

Sporting Praia is one of the most decorated football (soccer) clubs in Cape Verde and is the island's most decorated club, having won about 44 official titles, 14 of which are national titles and 30 which are regional titles.

== History ==
The club was founded on 2 December 1923 and is the oldest club in both the city and the island, it is the third oldest on the nation. The name is identical to the Sporting Clube de Portugal and is the 20th affiliate. Sporting Praia is the second oldest Sporting CP affiliate in Africa and its islands after Sportin Clube de Luanda.

=== In the regional competition ===
Before independence, Sporting won several regional titles in 1961, 1964 and in 1968. In the final years of Portuguese rule, Sporting Praia celebrated its 50th anniversary of its foundation in 1973. A year later, they won their final regional title before independence of the archipelago.

==== From independence to the breakup of the Santiago Championships into two zones and after ====
Tó Lobo was manager of Sporting Praia in the 1980s and the early 1990s, he led to win a few regional titles in 1984, 1985, 1988 and 1991. Later Tóca was manager for most of the 1990s. Sporting won two more regional titles for Santiago in 1997 and in 1998.

Notable players at the last decade of the 20th century and into the 21st included Piguita, Vargas and Ronny (Souto). For most of the time in the 20th century, some of its greatest players of the club played in Europe mostly Portugal.

In 1998, Sporting Praia celebrated its 75th anniversary of its foundation. Tó Lobo was once again coach for Sporting for the early 2000s. Tó Lobo led his team to win a regional title in 2002, the club finished with 38 points.

==== Sporting's success after the breakup of the Santiago Championships into two zones ====
Beto became coach of the club in late 2004 and remained until 2012, he took the club to further successes. Sporting had a total of eight titles for the South Zone, their first was in 2005 and won four consecutive in 2008. Also in 2005, Sporting had their best season with 16 wins, not a single loss and most of all 49 points surpassed on 7 April 2017. Of any of the island leagues, Sporting held the record for the most points for eleven years when Santiago North Premier Division's Varandinha took it with 63 points in 2016, second would be Scorpion Vermelho with 61 which Sporting would be third.

Sporting has the longest unbeaten record with 40 matches, it started on 30 April 2003 and ended on 10 December 2005.

On 10 November 2007, Sporting the champion faced Académica Praia, the cup winner in the 2007 regional super cup, the match had a goal draw and went into extra time, during that time, the stadium had a poor visibility and the match was halted, it was not replayed until 14 December, Sporting defeated Académica 2–1 and won their first super cup title for the South Zone.

Beto later led the club to its greatest success that Sporting had ever seen but not as they did in 2005 in 2009 and 2011, they were runner up of Santiago South, though the club entered the national championships on two occasions, the other as automatic holders of the national title. The greatest players of the time in the 2000s were Dário (Furtado), Bock, Platini, Zé di Tchecha, Stopira, Alex (Aires Marques), Babanco and later Tom Tavares, Patrick Andrade, Loloti and Figo who mainly led its successes even at the national level. In the early 2010s to 2015, one of its goalkeepers is the Senegalese Maguette. Another Senegalese played but a player named Théo Mendy. As did in its early decades of the club especially the 20th century, afterwards most of these greatest players later played in Europe predominantly Portugal.

Janito became coach in 2012 and kept its remaining regional successes going. Sporting underwent a 28 match unbeaten streak which started from 18 February 2012 to 16 November 2013. The team would win three titles in a row between 2012 and 2014 totalling eight.

In late 2012 Sporting Praia, entered as champion faced the regional cup winner Bairro (or ADESBA), the island's most dynamic club entirely lost the chance for another super cup title and lost the title to Bairro. A year later, entered as champions, Sporting would achieve better than last season defeating Travadores, the cup winner and claimed another super cup title.

==== Two seasons with nearly successes ====
Later Beto retook the position for about two years up to 2015 and the season was not as successful as earlier. Paulo Veiga was chairman between 2013 and 2016, and ruined a bit of Sporting Praia's successes of the earliest part of the centuryIn the 2014–15 season, in the regional super cup in late November, Sporting Praia was to face Tchadense, a second place cup winner as Sporting won both the championship and a cup title, the match was postponed and then cancelled. Later in the regional championships on 22 February in a match with CD Travadores, Sporting fielded an ineligible player, he scored a goal. Fans didn't like it and Travadores was awarded three goals and Sporting lost the match, the club lost three points by the secretary, the recent in the regional competition.

Janito Carvalho was again coach of the club for the season and no top successes the club would achieve as they did last time. Sporting's newly extended 2015/16 season results started at the lowest position in the first two weeks then climbed to second and did not got the number one spot until late in week 17, then third in week 20, then second and lastly returned to third and finished in that position with 46 points, 13 wins and 7 draws. Sporting had the championship's highest number goals scored with 49, less than half more than the previous season and was also the club's highest. Sporting's final match of the station numbering 7 was the championship's highest shared with Boavista and Desportivo. In the following season, Veiga's three-year presidential career went to an end. Carvalho moved to Académica da Praia in late 2016.

Carlos Daniel Caetano became president of the club in October or November 2016. Recently as of the 18th round, Sporting regained full success as the club has 14 wins and 4 draws and scored 21 goals, the goal total is second and is shared with Boavista's. Mbutidem Sunday, the Nigerian scored the most goals in the region numbering eleven alongside Travadores' Anilton. With a goal total of 46, it matches the previous season's totals but not 2012 total of 47, there is a possibility it will be shared with the 2005 point total and may become the greatest season ever led by the enlargement of the matches to 22. In the Santiago South Cup, Sporting was successful in the cup tournaments up to the third round when the club fielded two ineligible players in a match with Travadores, second overall, the original result was 2–0, the match was awarded 3–0 against the club and kicked out of the cup competition until the next season. Its success was also told in the regional cup competitions as the club defeated Ribeira Grande de Santiago in the cup semis on 13 April with the score of 0–1 and will appear in the cup final alongside Os Garridos, Sporting's next appearance at the cup final in three years.

==== A new turn towards another success ====
Started from 7 February 2016 with a win over Vitória, Sporting went on a 32 match unbeaten streak as of the 19th round of the 2016–17 season, of any island leagues, it is behind CS Mindelense with 34 matches which occurred between 2014 and 2016. Also Sporting had a 22 match unbeaten streak away at the regionals and surpassed that of São Vicente's, Mindelense's 18 match unbeaten streak at home and five more away which lasted from 2014 to April 2016. Overall, it is behind Académica Porto Novo's record of 30 which was from 2012 to April 2016. Sporting got 49 points, a club record tied with previous seasons with that total in 2005, Sporting achieved a large chance of becoming regional championship at the 20th round and became after their victory over Desportivo 0–1 on 7 April and also another seven match winning streak of the season was made. Sporting got the South Zone's ninth regional title. Also Sporting's points total which is the region's highest became 52, a new record made succeeding their 49 which they had in 2005. Sporting's attempt of making further club record in points completely vanished after their only loss to Boavista at the 23rd round, another mighty club of the city. Sporting's final match of the season was a victory over Tchadense and Sporting made 55 points, a club record that Sporting cherished. Of any of the island leagues in the nation, third it became behind Scorpion Vermelho's 61 of the north of the island. 17 wins Sporting got, a new club record superseded their 2005 totals and 43 goals scored, less than the previous season. In the 2017 regional cup, originally for 19 May, it was set for 7 May, Sporting defeated Garridos and won their recent cup title after winning 5–3 in the penalty shootout as the match ended in a goal draw. The regional Super Cup took place on 28 October and featured, Sporting defeated the cup runner-up Garridos and won their third and recent super cup title for the south of the island.

Sporting started off the 2017–18 season being first place up to the second round, they though then attempt to continue their astonishing unbeaten streak even away, that finally came to an end as Sporting suffered another loss in four Premier Division matches to rival Académica Praia with the result 3–2, which ended their unbeaten streak away totaling 24 matches in the First/Premier Division. Also their recent loss dropped their position to fourth at the sixth round and remained until 29 December Two straight scoreless draws Sporting followed then two wins with the scored 4–0 each. In between, Sporting played their first cup match and defeated Desportivo 2–1 and proceeded to the second round. Sporting had 14 points and 15 goals scored, the region's highest but remained fourth. On 29 December, Sporting defeated Celtic 2–1 and put every club having a loss or more for the season in Santiago South. Another win was made over their inaugural match with Tira Chapéu with the result 1–0. At the 10th round Sporting remained fourth, behind Académica, Boavista and now below Celtic but ahead of Desportivo (9-point difference), ADESBA, Tchadense and Travadores. A scoreless draw was followed with the historically powerful Travadores on 12 January and had a nine-point difference over Desportivo, fifth place. Sporting made a miracle for another win as they defeated Benfica 0–2 away, but the club remains fourth and has 27 points, an 11-point difference over a fifth placed club Desportivo, later Tchadense. Sporting suffered with an unexpected loss to Ribeira Grande on 26 January, another scoreless draw, fourth one was made with Académcia Praia next. Another loss to Boavista was followed, a repeat of the late April match. Sporting played another regional cup match on 6 February and again defeated Benfica 0–2 and proceeded to the quarterfinals, their next will be a rivalry with Académica. Back at the championships. Sporting made a relief with another win over Desportivo on 16 February. Sporting made draw no. 5, this time, a goal each made with Eugénio Lima who will to face relegation. Their minimal successes continued as they defeated Bairro 3–0 next round. Académica's win had Sporting one final chance of winning their next regional title, they blew it after an unexpected loss to Tchadense on 11 March, not lost is their upcoming national participation. Sporting shared their 33 goals with Celtic, a club who later faced at the 20th round and astonishingly ended in a 1–0 victory and became Sporting's second back to back win. Sporting's faced their rival Travadores at the 22nd and final round, Sporting suffered a 1–2 loss and made their fifth seasonal loss, not that many in 15 years. Sporting finished with 41 points and had 39 goals scored, the last time they scored that many was in the 2006–07 season.

=== In the provincial competition during the final decades of Portuguese rule ===
Sporting Praia's first appearance in the then colonial competition was in 1961 where they won their first championship title after defeating GD Amarantes, their second was in 1964 and lost 2–0 to Académica do Mindelo, their third was in 1969 after defeating CS Mindelense and their third in 1974 where they defeated Castilho from Mindelo 2–1 and claimed the final colonial title. At the time Sporting had the second most number of colonial titles with just two, behind Académica do Mindelo and Mindelense. Sporting had the third title totals from 1967 to 1974 with just one shared by three other Praia's clubs Académica and Boavista and from 1972 Travadores, from 1973, it was shared with GS Castilho. Sporting's totals were shared with Travadores from 1974 to independence.

=== In the national competition ===
Sporting Praia succeeded up to the finals in 1977 and their first after Cape Verde became independent, Sporting scored two goals in one of the two final matches, the club lost the penalty shootouts 4–3. At the 1978 national championships, Sporting faced the winner of Fogo, Botafogo, the match went to a dispute as Sporting fielded an ineligible player, the award was undetermined, the result was a null. It led to the cancellation of the championships and no finals took place which would feature the winner of the Barlavento Islands Mindelense.

Sporting would win their first title after independence in 1985 after defeating Morabeza from the small island of Brava 2–0, Sporting headed to their final competition appearance in 1988 which was unsuccessful, they lost to CS Mindelense 2–0 and 0–1 in the 1988 finals their second national title was won in 1991 after defeating Desportivo Ribeira Brava from up north 1–0 in the second leg, the only scored match which gave Sporting the first Cape Verdean club to enter the African Championship competition a year later, in national championship totals, it became second most, in 1995, it was shared with Boavista da Praia in 1995 and Travadores in 1996. Sporting faced Mindelense yet again in the 1997 edition and two matches ended in ties, one scoreless and one with a goal apiece, Sporting scored penalty shootouts to win their third title, since that time, Sporting has the second most number of championship titles, the first was from 1997 to 2008.

Their appearance in the 2002 season was not a playoff one, it was decided on a total of points and goals and Sporting claimed it in 2002 with 19 points, 6 wins and 22 goals scored ahead of Batuque FC by four goals and without a point or a win ahead. Sporting's highest match of the season was a 0–9 win over Académica da Brava which was played on 29 June The point total of 19 is the highest in national championship history, as the first phase would have a maximum of four or five games the following year, no other club surpassed the point total in the present day.

After the playoff system was restored, in the 2004–05 season, Sporting versus FC Derby was tied in the first leg, the team lost 4–3 to Derby along with the national title. Also that season saw being one of the highest total numbers of goals in history scored with 24 and 11 for the playoffs for a total of 35. The score 13 (who defeated Desportivo Estância Baixo) in a single match was one of the highest in national league history and is the highest in the club. Overall goal totals with the regionals was 99 and being the highest of any club scored to date.

In the 2006 season, the club beat the team known as Académico do Aeroporto from Espargos on Sal Island, during the semi-finals they won the most points, six before entering the finals and lost in the first leg and won in the second leg where Dário scored a goal at the 43rd minute and claimed the title for the 2005–06 season, a year later, the team claimed their second title in a row in the 2006–07 season and also were the championships of the island's south zone, at the second leg of the finals, Dário scored during stoppage time and equaled the score and won the match under the away goals rule. In the 2008 season, there were protests by fans over Académica's loss on 23 June over a referee that received a penalty to one of Sporting's players. This cause a delay in the playoffs and was finally resolved on 8 July, matches resumed two days later on 10 July. The results for the first leg was 1–0 and won 3–0 against Derby in the second, Zé di Tchetcha scored the first two in the first half while Platini scored it in the middle of the second half, yet again received their third title in 2008 season, their totals equaled Mindelense for just a season with the most titles, again Sporting competed in their recent African competition in 2009. Sporting competed in the 2009 edition where they faced CS Mindelense, the first leg was scoreless, Sporting won the second leg 3–0, the first goal was a penalty scored by Dário and advanced to the finals, Sporting faced Académica da Praia in their first ever rivalry of Southern Santiago and the city inside the national competition, all Sporting's three goals were scored by Nuna in the first (2–0) and second (1–1) legs and became the only club to win four consecutive titles, for the next five years. Sporting had solely the most championship titles in the country. Sporting did not compete in African competition in 2010, not even in 2013 likely due to financial problems. The 2010 and 2011 seasons were unsuccessful for Sporting, they've lost the title to the city's other rival FC Boavista and CS Mindelense of Mindelo by a total of a single goal. Earlier in the national championships in 2010 at the first round, they defeated Desportivo Ribeira Brava 7–2 on 22 May and became the highest scoring match in the championships, one of two, but on 30 May, it became the second biggest behind Boavista's win over Solpontense, later in 2011, their highest scoring match was two, three matches, Vulcânicos, Sal Rei and Ultramarina, all in the last three rounds before knockout stage. Their recent national title win was in 2012 where they defeated SC Atlético 1–1 in the first match up north in the island of São Nicolau, no goals scored in the second match. In 2013, their national championship totals was shared with Mindelense in 2013 and again Sporting has the second most championship titles since 2014. Also Sporting Praia competed in the first Cape Verdean Super Cup who was qualified as a champion in 2013 and faced the 2012 cup winner Onze Unidos, Sporting defeated that club in Vàrzea and claimed their only super cup title.

The club's next appearance in the national level was in the 2014 season, their highest appearance was up to the semis, after finishing 1st in Group A with 13 points, they challenged with Académica from the island of Fogo in their next playoff appearance, the first match was scoreless and lost to Académica 2–3 in the second match. Ró was the only scorer in the semis scored twice in the second match. Sporting Praia became the only club to have the most consecutive appearances in the national champions numbering ten between 2005 and 2014. In the 2014 Super Cup, the club lost to Mindelense.

So far Sporting Praia appeared 17 times at the finals, played 23 finals matches and scored 21 goals at the championship finals, most of the after the end of the 20th century.

For the 2017 season with the revival of the three group system but continues to have the playoffs, Sporting Praia played twice with another Sporting affiliate from Brava in Group C alongside Sal Rei and runner-up of São Vicente FC Derby. The season's first match was a win over Derby and the last was a scoreless draw in Brava. Sporting advanced to the semis and defeated Santo Antão South's Académica do Porto Novo with a total of 2–1 goals as the first leg had a goal draw. Sporting Praia made their next final playoff appearance in five years. Originally for 9 and 15 July, the problems between Mindelense and Ultramarina Tarrafal continued as access to Estádio Orlando Rodrigues in Tarrafal de São Nicolau, the island's most populated city was unavailable as they had no keys, later Mindelense did not appear for an unknown reason, Mindelense was disqualified and Sporting Praia faced Ultramarina Tarrafal in the finals, Sporting Praia won all two legs, first the 20 August match with the result of 1–2 in São Nicolau, then with the scored of 3–2 at home and Sporting finally claimed their next national title in five years, celebrations occurred in the stadium by Sporting fans on the club's tenth and recent national title.

In the following season, Sporting will be a participant in the championships, qualifying as national champions, recently they will play in Group C.

=== Continental appearances ===
Their first appearance in the African competition was in 1992 with the cup competition in the first round and defeated Port Autonome from Dakar, Senegal, they failed to appear in the second round when they would lose to Tunisia's Club Africain, this would be their only appearance under the former name. Sporting Praia was the first Cape Verdean club to compete in the continental championships. Their second appearance, the first in the CAF Champions League was in 2000 and challenged AS Tempête Mocaf from the Central African Republic in the preliminary round and lost. Their second appearance was against Fello Star from Guinea in 2007 and scored 1–0, they withdrew from the second match due to the civil war and strife in Guinea and Fello Star was awarded 3–0, Sporting Praia did not advance. The following year challenged two clubs, Morocco's FAR Rabat and Inter Luanda in the first round and in 2009 again played against FAR Rabat and lost the first match 6–0 and did not advance after scoring only a single point after the second match and that was their recent appearance. Sporting made the most appearance of a Cape Verdean football club in the continental championship competition totalling five. The next appearance of a Cape Verdean club of any sport into the African competition would be Bairro Craveiro Lopes in basketball in the 2015 season Their only CAF Cup Winners' Cup appearance was in 2001 in the preliminaries with Gazelle FC from Chad and score 5–2, no second match was played as one of the clubs withdrew. Their qualification into the 2000 continental championship and later the cup did not finish the criteria as there was no common two tier national divisions whereas the club remains in the following season and the last place club relegates while the first place of a second tier qualifies, the reason was unknown or that Sporting Praia was second or third in the regional championships, the 1999 winner GD Amarantes was not a professional club and later in 2000, the second place Académica Operária is not a professional club and had no financial capability to compete.

So far, Sporting scored a total of 16 goals, the most of any Cape Verde Team at the continental level, in the championships, Sporting scored a total of eleven goals which was the most of any Cape Verdean club, Sporting scored five in the CAF Cup Winners; Cup. Also Sporting played a total of 14 matches, 13 at the championships and one at the CAF Cup Winner's Cup.

=== Other regional competitions ===
Other than the cup and the super cup competitions, Sporting also has three opening tournament titles won in 2001, 2003 and in 2005.

=== Other competitions ===
Sporting Praia participated in the third edition of the Boavista Praia's Champion's Cup in the final days of October 2016, a friendly competition, Sporting Praia lost the final match on 30 October.

In October 2017, Sporting Praia were the first three participants outside the municipality of Tarrafal to the north and from the south of the island to compete in the 2017 GAFT Cup alongside Boavista and Desportivo of the same city. The club headed up to the semis on 24 October and made a goal draw with Desportivo Praia which went to extra time and lost 3–4 to that club.

== Stadium ==
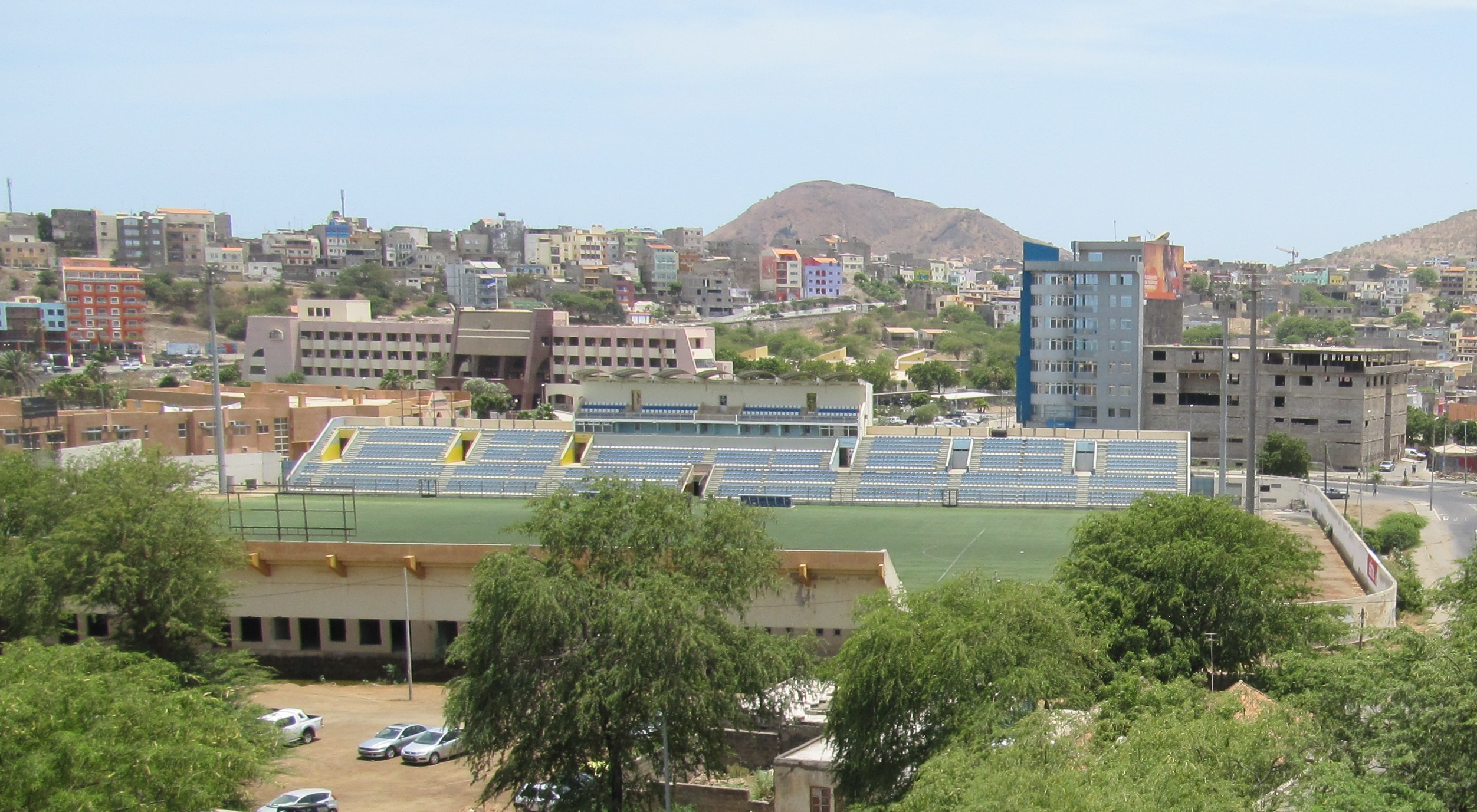
Estádio da Várzea, home field of Sporting Praia

Estádio da Várzea is a multi-use stadium in Praia, Cape Verde. It is currently used mostly for football matches. The stadium holds 8,000. Its address is Caixa Postal 234. The stadium has seat rows in the left and right sides and a small hill and a plateau lies to the west. The stadium is home to the three best football clubs in Cape Verde and the island's six best, Sporting. CD Travadores, Boavista FC, Académica, Desportivo and Vitória, all in the Santiago South Championships.

The club also practices at the stadium and at Complexo Desportivo Adega in Achada Grande Tras.

== Logo ==
Its logo has a shield and is colored green and features a lion with a football on the left, the abbreviated name is bubbled on the top and the unabbreviated form is at the bottom. The logo is identical to Sporting Clube de Portugal's old logo. Sporting Clube de Portugal are the fathering club of Sporting Clube da Praia.

== Uniform ==
Its uniform features a striped green-white shirt with green sleeves and green socks. The uniform is identical to its fathering club, Sporting Clube de Portugal.

Its home uniform is a white t-shirt with four thick green stripes, black shorts and white socks with three green stripes, the same to Sporting Lisbon's uniform color used for home matches. Its away uniform is black clothing with a t-shirt with three thick grey stripes.

Its former uniform was a green (coloured like tourmaline)-white T-shirt with green socks striped at the top and a black shorts for home games and a pastel green short, green shirt and green socks which were colored black for away games. Its later uniform would be a yellow shirt with green sleeve and collar edges, green shorts and socks for home games, a white T-shirt with black shorts and green socks for away games and a half white half black T-shirt with white shorts and green socks for alternate uniform when another team has a uniform colored white. From September 2014 to February 2017, its away uniform was a white t-shirt with green sleeves.

Home uniform in 2009 and 2010	Away uniform in 2009 and 2010	Home uniform up to 2014	Away uniform up to 2014	Third colours up to 2014	Away uniform up to February 2016

== Supporters and sponsors ==
The fans are known as Torcida Verde Santiago. A Torcida Verde is a cheerleader supporter of Sporting Clube da Praia. The name is identical to its fathering club, Sporting Clube de Portugal. Their mottos are: O Nosso Amor, Não Conhece Distâncias (Our Love, Do Not Know Distances). Torcida Verde Santiago's mascot is a lion.

Its sponsors include the nation's second most used communications company Unitel t+ as well as Incolac, Caixa which is the nation's business bank and Primavera.

== Rivalries ==
Their biggest rivals is fans of CS Mindelense called Laranja Exército (see Sporting Praia–Mindelense rivalry) and the former rival was Académica do Mindelo where Sporting fans were called Mancha Negra (see Sporting–Académica Mindelo rivalry). The last challenge between Sporting and Académica Mindelo was the 2007 finals. Académica Mindelo was relegated to São Vicente's second division in 2013 and played up to 2014. Sporting's rivalry with Académica Mindelo entirely disappeared today, a tiny part was the national championship restructuring for the upcoming 2017 season done in November 2015.

Their biggest rivalry at the regional level are with Boavista, Travadores, Vitória and Académica Praia. All forming the Praia derbies, one of them is titled Praia derby. They are the biggest rivalries in Cape Verde at the regional level along with the Mindelense-Derby rivalry of São Vicente.

== Honours ==
=== National ===
- Championship of Cape Verde: 13
  - (Before independence) 3: 1961, 1969, 1974.
  - (Since independence) 10: 1985, 1991, 1997, 2002, 2006, 2007, 2008, 2009, 2012, 2017.
- Cape Verdean Cup: 1

2018

- Cape Verdean Super Cup: 1

2013

=== Regional ===
- Regional championship totals: 23
  - Santiago Regional Championships: 13

1961, 1964, 1969, 1974, 1977, 1978, 1984, 1985, 1988, 1991, 1997, 1998, 2002.

  - Santiago South Premier Division: 10

2002, 2005, 2006, 2007, 2008, 2010, 2012, 2013, 2014, 2017

- Santiago South Cup: 4 listed

2008, 2014, 2017, 2018

- Santiago South Super Cup: 2

2013, 2017

- Torneio Inicio da Praia (Opening Tournament): 3

2001, 2003, 2005.

== Statistics ==
- Best position: First Round (continental)
- Best position at cup competitions: 1st (national)
- Best position at an opening tournament: 1st
- Appearances at the national cup competition: Once, in 2018
- Appearances at a super cup competition:
  - National: 2
  - Regional: 4
- Total number of goals scored at the continental level: 16
  - CAF Champions League: 11
  - CAF Cup Winner's Cup: 5
- Total matches played at the continental level: 14
  - CAF Champions League: 13
  - CAF Cup Winner's Cup: Once
- Best season: 2017 season (17 wins, 4 draws and 55 points)
- Most wins at the Regional Championships: 19 (3 April 2004 to 10 April 2005)
- Highest number of wins in a season: 17, in 2017 – Probable regional record
- Longest unbeaten run: 40 matches (30 April 2003 to 10 December 2005)
- Highest number of goals scored in a season:
  - National: 24 (regular season), 11 (playoffs), total: 35, in 2005
  - Regional: 64, in 2005
- Highest number of points:
  - National: 19, in 2002 (National record, shared with Batuque)
  - Regional: 55, in 2017 – New regional record
- Highest scoring match in the National Championships: Sporting Praia 13–0 Estância Baixo, 11 June 2005

Other:

- Appearance at the GAFT Cup: Once, in 2017
- Highest number of goals conceded in a season: 14 (national), 2016

== Players ==
=== Current squad ===
As of 4 May 2017

Note: Flags indicate national team as defined under FIFA eligibility rules; some limited exceptions apply. Players may hold more than one non-FIFA nationality.

No.	Pos.	Nation	Player
1	GK	(Cape Verde) CPV	Kelvi
2	DF	(Cape Verde) CPV	Kadú
3	DF	(Cape Verde) CPV	Admar
4	DF	(Cape Verde) CPV	'Blessed' M. Teixeira
5	DF	(Cape Verde) CPV	Madjer
6	MF	(Portugal) POR	Tabaco
7	MF	(Cape Verde) CPV	Gily
8	MF	(Cape Verde) CPV	Palo
9	FW	(Nigeria) NGA	Mike
10	MF	(Cape Verde) CPV	Tigana
11	FW	(Cape Verde) CPV	Nildo
13	MF	(Ivory Coast) CIV	Gaussou Badayoko

No.	Pos.	Nation	Player
14	DF	(Cape Verde) CPV	Paulo Tavares
15	DF	(Cape Verde) CPV	Panduru
17	MF	(Cape Verde) CPV	Pery
18	FW	(Portugal) POR	Kikas
19	FW	(Cape Verde) CPV	Tei
20	MF	(Cape Verde) CPV	Dário Paiva
21	FW	(Cape Verde) CPV	Igor
22	FW	(Nigeria) NGA	Matthew Mbutidem Sunday
23	GK	(Cape Verde) CPV	Txu
24	DF	(Cape Verde) CPV	Tidy
25	MF	(Cape Verde) CPV	Nelito
26	MF	(Portugal) POR	Camaron

== Chairmen history ==
Name	Nationality	From	To
Jorge Carlos Vasconcelos	Cape Verde		1993
Dinis Fonseca	Cape Verde	1995	2003
Carlos Évora	Cape Verde	2003	2012
António Mendes	Cape Verde	2003	2012
Rui Évora	Cape Verde	2012	2013
Paulo Veiga	Cape Verde	2013	October 2016
Carlos Daniel Caetano	Cape Verde	since October 2016	

== Managerial history ==
Name	Nationality	From	To
(Victor) Tó Lobo	Cape Verde	around 1983	around 1992
Tóca (José Antunes)	Cape Verde	in 1997	
Tó Lobo	Cape Verde	around 2000	2003
Beto (Felisberto Cardoso)	Cape Verde	2004	2012
Alex Teixeira	Cape Verde	2012	2012
Janito Carvalho	Cape Verde	2012	2014
Beto (Felisberto Cardoso)	Cape Verde	September 2014	October 2015
Janito Carvalho	Cape Verde	October 2015	2016
Lito (Cláudio de Aguiar)	Cape Verde	2017	mid-January 2017

=== Assistant managers ===
Name	Nationality	From	To
Pisco	Cape Verde	in 2008/09	
Zé Piguita	Cape Verde		up to 2013/14
Dino	Cape Verde	2014	around 2016

== Goalkeeping coaches ==
- (Cape Verde) João Moreira (in 2009)
- (Cape Verde) Tchabana (up to 2013/14)
- (Cape Verde) Berra (until August/September 2016)

== Staff ==
Updated 23 October 2015

Name	Role
(Cape Verde) Paulo Veiga	Chairman
(Cape Verde) Janito Carvalho	Manager and head coach
(Cape Verde) Dino	Assistant manager
(Cape Verde) Berra	Goalkeeping Coach
(Cape Verde) Nelson/ Manú (as of 2013/14)	Team chef

== Other clubs ==
The club also has youth teams, the U-11 whose coach is António Carvalho, the U-13 team whose coach is Helton Delgado and the U-15 team whose coach is Dário Furtado, the club's former player

== Named after ==
Two streets are named after the club in the neighborhood of Achada de Santo Antònio and named as Sporting, one a street (rua), the other a court (largo), one of its offices are located there.

== See also ==
- Other clubs named "Sporting" in Cape Verde:
  - Sporting (Boa Vista Island)
  - Sporting (Brava)
  - Sporting Clube de Porto Novo
  - SC Farense de Fonte Filipe
  - Logo based but a different name: GD Palmeira of Sal
