= CD Travadores =

Football club in Cape Verde

- Full name: Clube Desportivo Travadores
- Nicknames: Índios (Indians); Águias (Eagles)
- Founded: 15 October 1930
- Ground: Estádio da Várzea, Praia, Cape Verde
- Capacity: 8,000
- Chairman: Armindo Oliveira
- Manager: Tazinho
- League: Santiago South Premier Division
- 2017–18: 8th
- Website: https://cdtravadores.wixsite.com/travadores
| Home colours | Away colours | Third colours |

Clube Desportivo Travadores (Capeverdean Crioulo, ALUPEC: Klubi Desportivu Travadoris) is a football club in the Santiago South Premier Division in Cape Verde and are one of the unrelegated clubs of the Premier Division. It is based in the capital city of Praia, on the island of Santiago, and plays in a stadium with a capacity of 8,000. It is affiliated with Portuguese club S.L. Benfica and was its first affiliate in Cape Verde and in the western part of West Africa. Travadores' nicknames are Índios (Indians) and Águias (Eagles).

Travadores is one of the most successful football clubs in Cape Verde, having won 12 official titles, of which 3 are national and 9 are regional.

Along with Sporting and Boavista, they form the Big Three of Praia (until 2003, the Big Three of Santiago).

== History ==
The club was founded on 15 October 1930 in the then-colonial capital of Praia, and is the island's second, and the country's fourth, oldest club. CD Travadores was officially registered on 25 May 1939.

On 11 August 1987, the club was elevated to the status of "Institution of Public Utilities".

During the 20th century, the club's best players included Casos de Mota Gomes, Sabino, Nicou, Nutcha (ALUPEK: Nutxa), Rubóm (Rubom), Mariozinho, Vu (then spelled as Vú), Raulinho, Bala, Flávio, Abel Barreto, Zé Maria, Zé Galado, Lemos, Tazinho Né, Zé di Loja, Cotchi (ALUPEK: Kotxi), Capuz and Tchacula. Later players included Tchesco and Loloti.

The club has three top-flight titles, of which two are national. The club has also won nine regional titles, of which seven are of Santiago and one of the island's South Zone.

The club finished towards the bottom of the table in recent years, including 8th place in 2009, 2011 and in 2013. Travadores won the regional cup title for 2013. In 2014, the club finished as runner-up in the South Zone, earning 43 points and scoring 37 goals. For the next two seasons, the club finished 7th with 28 points and seven wins in 2016. They also finished 7th in 2017 but were less successful, with 25 points, 7 wins and four draws.

Travadores kicked off the 2017–18 season with a win over Ribeira Grande and started fourth, then they suffered a three match losing streak and was 11th place as of the 4th round of championship competition. Travadores made a two match winning streak before they lost three straight matches and started off their small downturn. Two draws were followed by a loss to Ribeira Grande on 19 January, then a draw with Académica. Travadores is recently 9th place which had been for the past four rounds and now has two points above the 11th-placed club and kept their relief from relegation.

=== Provincial appearances ===
Travadores first participated in the playoffs in 1954 and lost to CS Mindelense; this repeated in 1960 with the same club and in 1968 with Académica do Mindelo. They won their first provincial title in 1972 by defeating Académica from Mindelo. In 1974, during Portugal's Carnation Revolution, Travadores defeated Castilho 2–1 and got their second and most-recent provincial title.

=== National appearances ===
After the end of colonial rule in Cape Verde, Travadores participated in the independent nation's finals for the first time, losing to Mindelense in 1992. In 1994, they won their first national title, defeating SC Atlético from the island of São Nicolau 2–0 and 2–1. They won their second and most-recent title in 1996 in the triangular phase, which featured São Nicolau's FC Ultramarina of Tarrafal de São Nicolau and Académica do Sal.

Travadores' recent appearances at the national championships were in 2001, where they had only a draw and got one point, and in 2003, where the club took part in Group A, finishing with two wins and a draw and qualifying up to the semi-finals.

=== Continental competitions ===
Travadores has entered African competitions three times. In their first continental competition, the CAF Cup in 1993, they advanced to the preliminaries. They also appeared in the 1995 African Cup of Champions and the 1997 CAF Champions League.

== Stadium ==
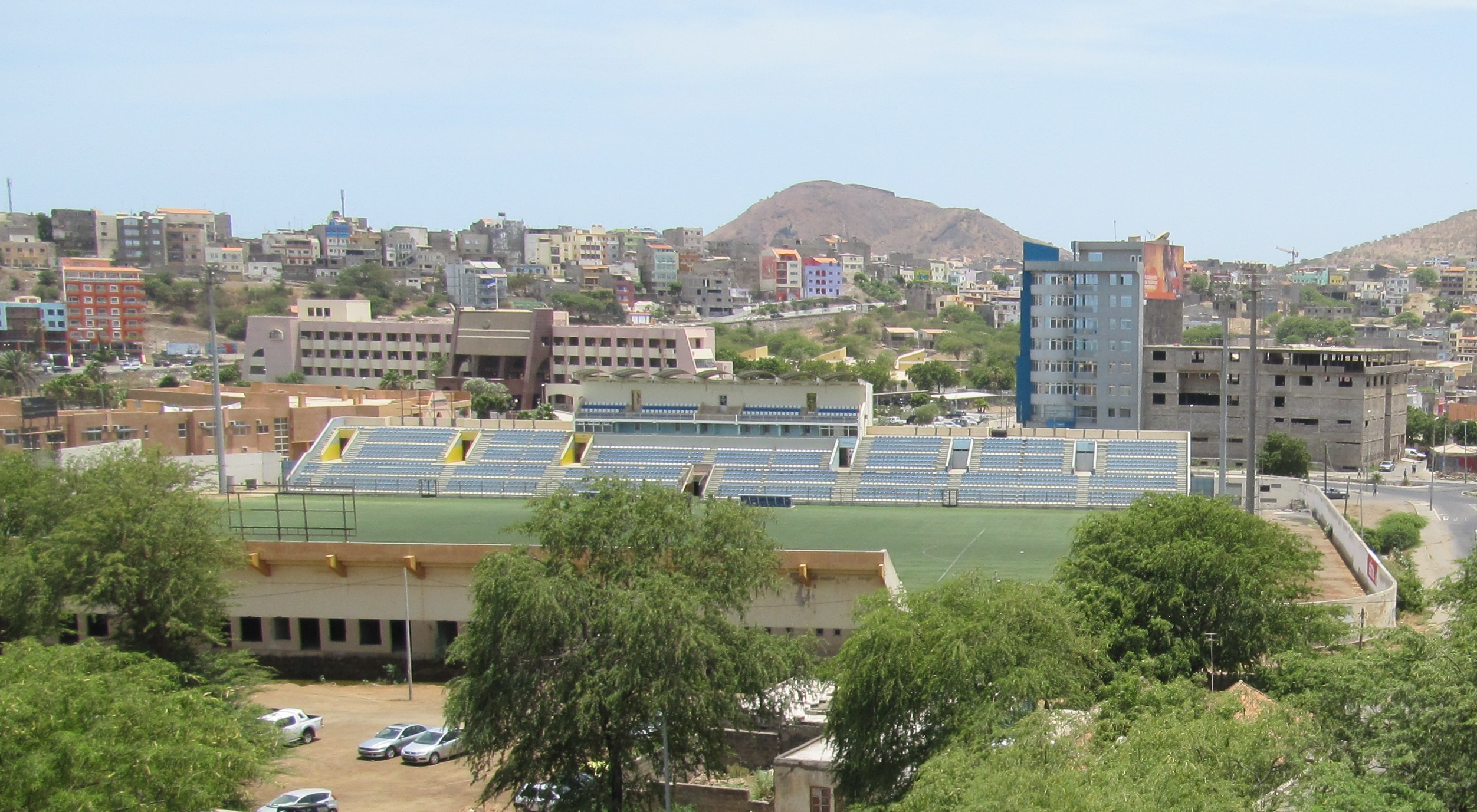
Estádio da Várzea, the home ground of CD Travadores

Travadores plays its home matches at Estádio da Várzea, along with Praia's other teams including Sporting, Boavista FC, Académica, Desportivo and Vitória, all in the Santiago South Championships. It is currently used mostly for football matches. The stadium holds 8,000. Its address is Caixa Postal 234. The stadium has seat rows in the left and right sides and a small hill and a plateau lies to the west. The club practices at the stadium and also at Sucupira, just northwest.

The club played at the Sucupira Field between 2001 and 2006, when they moved to the Estádio da Várzea.

== Logo ==
Its logo is a white crest (not fully circular) with a golden bird above, a green and red ribbon bearing the Latin inscription "E pluribus unum", a red and white shield with a ball and a blue ribbon with the initials of the club's name in the middle. Its logo is nearly the same as Benfica's, but the outer circle is white.

== Uniform ==
Its uniform colors has red clothing for home games, the shirt has two dark thick red stripes in the sleeves with thin white stripes and has thin white rim on its shorts and blue stripes on its socks. Its away uniform is with the clothing white and the stripes red, it does not have the thick stripes as the home uniform does, on the socks, it has the same blue stripes. Its third colour uniform is blue with red thin stripes on its sleeves, shorts and socks and has a dark blue red wide stripes in the middle and the back of the shirt. Its shirts are currently supplied by Adidas.

Its former uniform was a red shirt and socks with white shorts for home games used up to 2014. Between October 2014 and 2017, its uniform color were red with a white collar for home games and a white T-shirt and socks with red shorts for away games

Home uniform up to the 2014 season
Home uniform from October 2014 to October 2017
Away uniform from October 2014 to October 2017

== Rivalry ==
The club's main rivalry is with Sporting, forming the Derby Eterno da Praia (Eternal Derby of Praia). Travadores is also rivals with Desportivo Praia.

== Honours ==
- Cape Verdean Championship: 3
  - Before independence: 1
    - 1972
  - After independence: 2
    - 1994, 1996
- Taça Nacional de Cabo Verde: 1
  - 2022
- Regional championship titles: 9
  - Santiago Island League: 8
    - 1954, 1960, 1967, 1967/68, 1971/72, 1991/92, 1993/94, 1995/96, 1999/2000
  - Santiago Island League (South): 1
    - 2002/03
- Santiago South Cup: 1

2013

== League and cup history ==
=== Performance in African competitions ===
Travadores's results in CAF competition
| Season | Competition | Qualification method | Round | Opposition | Home | Away | Aggregate |
|---|---|---|---|---|---|---|---|
| 1993 | CAF Cup | Runner-up in the Cape Verdean National Championships | First round | (Mauritania) ASC Air Mauritanie | 0–0 | 0–0 | 0–0 (5–6 p) |
| 1995 | African Cup of Champions Clubs | Cape Verdean champions | Preliminary Round | (The Gambia) Real de Banjul | 0–0 | 1–0 | 0–1 |
| 1997 | CAF Champions League | Cape Verdean champions | Preliminary Round | (Algeria) USM Alger | 1–3 | 6–1 | 2–9 |

=== Colonial era ===
| Year | Final(s) | | Club |
| Year | 1 | 2 | Club |
|---|---|---|---|
| 1960 | Lost | | CS Mindelense |
| 1966 | Lost | | CS Mindelense |
| 1972 | 2–2 | 1–0 | Académica (Mindelo) |

=== National championship ===
| Season | Div. | Pos. | Pl. | W | D | L | GS | GA | GD | P | Notes | Playoffs |
|---|---|---|---|---|---|---|---|---|---|---|---|---|
| 2000 | 1A | 4 | 2 | 0 | 1 | 1 | 2 | 3 | −1 | 1 | Did not advance | Did not participate |
| 2003 | 1B | 2 | 4 | 2 | 1 | 1 | 7 | 4 | +3 | 7 | Promoted into playoffs | Semi-finalist |

=== Island / Regional championship ===
| Season | Div. | Pos. | Pl. | W | D | L | GS | GA | GD | P | Cup | Tour | Notes |
|---|---|---|---|---|---|---|---|---|---|---|---|---|---|
| 2002 | 2 | 2 | 18 | 11 | 4 | 3 | 37 | 15 | +22 | 37 | | | |
| 2002–03 | 2 | 1 | 18 | 13 | 4 | 1 | 33 | 14 | +19 | 43 | | | Promoted into the National Championships |
| 2003–04 | 2 | 6 | 18 | 6 | 3 | 9 | 26 | 18 | +8 | 21 | | | |
| 2005 | 2 | 5 | 17 | 7 | 5 | 5 | 23 | 19 | +4 | 26 | | | |
| 2005–06 | 2 | 3 | 18 | 11 | 6 | 1 | 26 | 10 | +16 | 39 | | | |
| 2007 | 2 | 3 | 18 | 8 | 5 | 5 | 28 | 13 | +15 | 31 | | | |
| 2007–08 | 2 | 4 | 18 | 8 | 4 | 6 | 23 | 19 | +4 | 28 | | | |
| 2008–09 | 2 | 8 | 18 | 2 | 7 | 9 | 10 | 26 | −16 | 13 | | | |
| 2010–11 | 2 | 8 | 18 | 5 | 5 | 8 | 14 | 21 | −7 | 20 | | | |
| 2011–12 | 2 | 5 | 18 | 7 | 3 | 8 | 21 | 21 | 0 | 24 | | | |
| 2012–13 | 2 | 8 | 18 | 4 | 6 | 8 | 19 | 21 | −2 | 18 | Winner | | |
| 2013–14 | 2 | 2 | 18 | 13 | 4 | 1 | 37 | 10 | +27 | 43 | | | |
| 2014–15 | 2 | 8 | 18 | 5 | 1 | 12 | 17 | 38 | −21 | 16 | | | |
| 2015–16 | 2 | 7 | 22 | 7 | 7 | 8 | 26 | 31 | −5 | 28 | Semi-finalist | Not held | |
| 2016–17 | 2 | 7 | 22 | 7 | 4 | 11 | 34 | 48 | −14 | 25 | Round of 8 | Not held | |
| 2017–18 | 2 | 9 | 22 | 7 | 3 | 12 | 25 | 38 | -14 | 24 | In progress | Not held | |

== Statistics ==
- Best position: First Round (Continental)
- Best position at a cup competition: Preliminary round (Continental)
- Highest number of points in a season: 7 (national)
- Appearances at a continental championship: 3
- Appearance in a regional super cup competition: Once, in 2013
- Total goals scored at African competitions: 2 (CAF Champions League)
- Total matches played at the continental level: 6
  - CAF Champions League: 4
  - CAF Cup Winner's Cup: 2
- Lowest position: 9th – Premier Division

== Players ==
=== Current squad ===
As of 30 April 2017

Note: Flags indicate national team as defined under FIFA eligibility rules; some limited exceptions apply. Players may hold more than one non-FIFA nationality.

| No. | Pos. | Nation | Player |
|---|---|---|---|
| — | | CPV | Claudino Évora Almeida |
| — | | CPV | Carlos Andrade |
| — | | | Kadu Barreto |
| — | | CPV | Jorge Alexandre Cardoso |
| — | | CPV | Celso Mendes |
| — | | CPV | Bruno Miguel Correia |
| — | DF | CPV | Djimmy (Admar de Jesus Lopes (Note: Also as Admir de Jesus Lopes)) |
| — | | | Edmilson Varela |
| — | | CPV | Zébi (Eusébio)' Tavares |
| — | DF | CPV | João Paulo Ferreira |
| — | | CPV | Genilson Sena Monteiro |
| — | | CPV | Gilson Silva Gonçalves |
| — | | CPV | Fortunato Gonçalves |
| — | | CPV | Ildemar Gomes |
| — | | CPV | Ivandro Correia |
| — | | CPV | Ivandro Pereira Cabral |

| No. | Pos. | Nation | Player |
|---|---|---|---|
| — | | CPV | Keven Alves |
| — | | CPV | Adilson Lopes |
| — | | CPV | Ivan Bruno Lopes |
| — | | CPV | Euclides Mascarenhas |
| — | | CPV | José Carlos Mendes |
| — | | CPV | Lucas Cabral Mendes |
| — | | CPV | Carlos Alberto Moreno |
| — | | CPV | Paulo Ricardo Natividade |
| — | | CPV | Ildemar Gomes |
| — | FW | CPV | Fufuco |
| — | | | Gbemisola Ogundele |
| — | MF | NGR | Chibike Okoronkwo |
| — | | CPV | José Pereira |
| — | | CPV | Clarimundo Stevon P. Mendes |
| — | | CPV | Walter António Fernandes |

== Other sports ==
Travadores also had basketball, boxing, and volleyball teams, but due to an economic crisis and low arena visits had to close two clubs. The teams once played at Gimnodesportivo Vavá Duarte. Travadores also has an athletic team and plays at Complexo Desportivo Adega.

== See also ==
- List of football clubs in Cape Verde
