= Santiago South Opening Tournament =

- Founded: 2000
- Region: Southern Santiago Island, Cape Verde
- Teams: 8
- Current champions: Desportivo da Praia
- Most championships: Sporting Clube da Praia

The Santiago South Opening Tournament or the Association Cup (Portuguese: Torneio de Abertura de Santiago Sul, Capeverdean Crioulo, ALUPEC or ALUPEK: Turnéu di Abertura di Santiagu Sul), is an opening tournament competition (equivalent to a league cup used in other countries) played during the season in the south of Santiago, Cape Verde consisting the municipalities of Praia, Ribeira Grande de Santiago and São Domingos. The competition is organized by the Santiago South Regional Football Association (Associação Regional de Futebol de Santiago Sul de Futebol, ARFSS). Its current champions is Desportivo da Praia who won their second and recent title in 2016. Up to around 2012, the competition was mostly known as the Praia Cup. Up to around 2010, it was the Praia Municipal Tournament.

The first edition took place in 2000 and was the second regional competition after the championships alongside Boa Vista, Fogo and Maio.

Sporting Praia was its first winner won in 2002. Sporting won the most tiles totaling five and Desportivo is second with two titles. Several cancellations occurred, in 2014 and in the early part of the 2016-17 season.

== Winners ==
Season	Winner	Runner-up
2001	Not held	
2002	Sporting Clube da Praia	
2003	Boavista da Praia	
2004	Sporting Clube da Praia	
2006	Sporting Clube da Praia	
2007-08	Unknown	
2009	Sporting Clube da Praia	
2010-11	Unknown	
2012	Sporting Clube da Praia	
2013-14	Not held	
2014-15	Desportivo da Praia	
2015-16	Desportivo da Praia	
2016-2018	Not held	

== See also ==
- Sports in Santiago, Cape Verde
- Santiago South Premier Division
- Santiago South Cup
- Santiago South Super Cup
