= Santiago South Cup =

Santiago (Island) South Cup
- Founded: 1985
- Region: Southern Santiago Island, Cape Verde
- Teams: 22
- Current champions: Sporting Clube da Praia
- 2017–18 Santiago South Cup

The Santiago South Zone Cup (Portuguese: Copa da Ilha de Santiago Sul, Capeverdean Crioulo, ALUPEC or ALUPEK: Kopa da dja di Santiagu Sul) is the oldest regional cup competition in Cape Verde and is played during the season in the south of island of Santiago, Cape Verde consisting the municipalities of Praia, Ribeira Grande de Santiago and São Domingos. It consists of all the clubs from all the two regional divisions and are divided into about six rounds. The cup competition is organized by the Santiago South Regional Football Association (Associação Regional de Santiago Sul, ARFSS). The cup winner competed in the regional super cup final in the following season. Since 2007, the winner qualifies into the Cape Verdean Cup which were canceled from 2012 to 2017 due to financial and scheduling reasons.

Until 2003, it covered the whole island and was known as the Santiago Island Cup (Taça Insular/Regional de Santiago) and was also known as the Praia Cup (Taça da Praia) in which it would later be used for the opening tournament and consisted of only eight to ten clubs and they only came from the city of Praia, no clubs from the north of the island competed in the cup competition as no clubs from that part were registered at the time. The cup competition split in 2002 and the Santiago Cup became the Santiago South Cup. The first cup competition in the North Zone took place in 2007, further competitions took place, recent competitions did not take place today there due to financial reasons. Clubs from the municipality of São Domingos took part of the North Zone's cup competitions until 2010. The 2016 cup final did not take place in May 2016 due to an unknown reason. The cup final was rescheduled and set to April 15, 2017 and Delta won their only regional cup title.

Its recent cup winner is Sporting Clube da Praia who won their second straight cup title on March 31. Sporting also achieved qualification as cup winner into the super cup which will take place later in the season.

== Winners ==
Season	Winner	Score	Runner-up
1985	Académica da Praia		
1986-1993	Unknown		
1994	Académica da Praia		
1995	ADESBA		
1996-98	Unknown		
1999-2001	Not held		
2002-2006	Unknown		
2006-07	Académica da Praia		
2007-08	Sporting Praia		
2008-09	Boavista Praia		
2009-10	Boavista Praia		
2010-11	Boavista Praia		Vitória da Praia
2011-12	ADESBA		
2012-13	CD Travadores	2–0	Celtic da Praia
2013/14	Sporting Praia		Tchadense
2014/15	Boavista Praia		Académica da Praia
2015/16 (Note: Played on April 15, 2017)	GDRC Delta		Boavista Praia
2016–17	Sporting Praia	1-1 (5–3 pen.)	Os Garridos
2017–18	Sporting Praia	2–1	CD Travadores

== See also ==
- Sports in Santiago, Cape Verde
- Santiago South Premier Division
- Santiago South Super Cup
- Santiago South Opening Tournament (Praia Cup)
