= Boavista FC (Cape Verde) =

Football club in Praia, Cape Verde

- Full name: Boavista Futebol Clube
- Nicknames: Boavista; As Panteras (The Panthers)
- Founded: July 5, 1939
- Ground: Estádio da Várzea, Praia, Cape Verde
- Capacity: 8,000
- Chairman: Luis Manuel Semedo
- Manager: Humberto Bettencourt
- League: Santiago Island League (South)
- 2017–18: 2nd
| Home colours | Away colours | Third colours |

Boavista Futebol Clube (Capeverdean Crioulo, ALUPEC or ALUPEK: FK Boavista or FK Boabista, Boavista or Boavista Futibol Klubi) is a football club that had played in the Premier division and plays in the Santiago Island South Zone League in Cape Verde. It is based in the city of Praia in the island of Santiago. The team has only reached a few of these games before and after independence. Its current president is Luis Manuel Semedo who once coached Boa Vista's Académica Operária. and its manager is Nelito Antunes.

Boavista Praia is one of the most successful football (soccer) club in Cape Verde, As of 2017 having won about 18 official titles, 6 are national titles and 12 are regional titles.

Its nicknames are As Panteras, also the nickname of Porto's Boavista F.C., the other nickname is Boavista, the club name. Not commonly used is Os Axadrezados (The Chequered ones) which is also Porto's Boavista FC nickname.

== History ==
The club was founded on July 5, 1939, Santiago Island's fourth oldest and Cape Verde's sixth oldest club. Its logo and uniform with minimal exceptions are identical to Portugal's Boavista FC. The name is not related to or located on Boa Vista Island to the northeast, it is named after a Porto club founded during colonial rule. Its nickname is even a club name. It was founded on the same day which 36 years later became Independence Day in Cape Verde.

Boavista won insular titles in 1963, 1976, 1987, 1993 and 1995, after it split into two zones, Boavista won two titles for the South Zone in 2011 and in 2015. Boavista also won cup titles, three consecutive cup titles was won between 2009 and 2011, their last was in 2015, Boavista did not qualify for the first time to the 2015 Cape Verdean Cup due to financial concerns. Boavista's only regional Super Cup win was in 2015 after they defeated Académica da Praia 1–0.

Boavista club celebrated its 50th anniversary in 1979.

Boavista finished 8th in the 2001–02 season with 18 points, 4 wins and 7 draws and losses, they scored 16 goals which the least to date for the club and conceded 21 goals to other Santiago South clubs, the 2001–02 season was the last time they finished below the 6th-place position at the regionals. In 2003, Boavista did better with 35 points, but failed to enter the national championships as they finished 2nd place behind CD Travadores. Their positions waned to 3rd in 2004 but scored 35 goals that season, and 6th in 2005, their last under the 5th position at the regionals, the club also done the most draws to date numbering eight. 23 points they had for the next two seasons. Boavista's success did better for 2006 as they had 6 wins and 5 draws and 22 goals scored, Boavista finished fourth for the next two seasons. In 2007, Boavista had 6 draws and 28 goals scored in Santiago South and had 30 points. Boavista had 8 wins for the next two seasons. In 2008, they scored better with 23 goals. In 2009, Boavista finished third with 37 points, it was their club record.

A year later in 2010, they finished second with 43 points, it was their club record for points for the next five seasons, Boavista finished with 38 points which equalled their goal numbers scored. At the national championships in 2010, they defeated Solpontense from the north of Santo Antão 7–1 and made it the biggest win at the national championships and one of two highest scoring matches. Later in 2011, the first four rounds were unsuccessful at the national championships, a scoreless draw was made with Académica do Porto Novo. Boavista defeated Maio's Onze Unidos, then lost to Académico do Aeroporto do Sal, and finally defeated Rosariense Clube with the score 6–0 which made it the highest scoring match at the nationals tying Mindelense's 6–0 win over Vulcânicos in the first round. Boavista finished third with 7 points and failed to qualify into the knockout stage.

=== Recent regional championship competitions ===
Boavista won the 2011–12 season's first match with a 2–0 win over Desportivo. A loss to Varanda was followed, then a two match winning streak was next before a goal draw was made with Celtic. Another win was followed, then a scoreless draw with Sporting. Boavista made two more wins, with a revenge one over Varanda and Celtic. From the 14th round, they were third and finished at that position. Their last four matches ended in draws with the last one with two goals apiece with Tchadense. Boavista had 30 points, 8 wins and six draws, also they scored 25 goals together with AD Ribeira Grande. Janito was manager in 2012, Boavista's first match of the season was the same club at the first round Desportivo, they made a two-goal draw, then lost to the mighty Sporting Praia. The Panthers (Pateras) made two more wins before a two match streak was followed. On February 8, they defeated Tchadense, then a 5–1 win over Ribeira Grande. Boavista later lost to the lesser Varanda before going on a two consecutive match wins. A loss to Travadores was followed, Boavista made two more wins before two consecutive draws were made, first a scoreless one with Celtic, then a goal apiece with Tchadense. Boavista's final match was a 0–1 win over Ribeira Grande, threw that club into the Second Division for the following season. Boavista repeatedly finished third with 20 points and had nine wins and three draws. Boavista had 26 goals, one extra than last season. Janito left as Boavista's coach in 2013.

Humberto Bettencourt became manager in late 2013 and tried for a successful season for the club, their first match of the season was a win over ADESBA, a goal draw with Travadores was next, another win was made, this time over Tchadense. The Capital Derby had Boavista lost the match 1–0 to Sporting. Two more losses were made before six straight wins were made, a small feat unmade in seasons with the third one awarded by the regional association as Desportivo was not present at a January 25 match. Boavista made a bit of a relief as they made just a draw with Sporting, a goal apiece, two additional draws were made, first to Académica and finally Tchadense. Two straight wins were followed before the club lost the final match to Desportivo on March 29. Boavista finished lower with fourth but had a point more than last season with 31. Three more goals were scored than last season which numbered 29. Bettencourt left the club as manager, not to be coaching with Boavista Praia until 2017.

The next manager was Nelito Antunes in 2014, he would bring success to the club. A two-goal draw with Travadores was the club's first match of the season and was fifth. Three straight wins were made defeating Bairro, Celtic and Desportivo, from the third round onward, first place the club was. A goal draw was made with Vitória. Next was a win over weak Varanda then a draw with their rival Sporting was made. A win over Os Garridos was next before the season's only loss was made to Académica. The Panthers of Boavista was surprised that a two match winning streak was next. A scoreless draw with Celtic was next, followed by the remaining six matches ending in victories with the fourth one, a 5–0 win over Os Garridos which was the region's highest of the season. As they won the 2015 championship which was their last, the club had 43 points which matched their 2010 club record, also they scored 37 goals, the most sharing Desportivo's. Nelito Antunes left Boavista Praia for a year.

The club in 2015 got a new manager for a year from Spartak d'Aguadinha, Joel de Castro from Portugal. In the 2015/16 season, first time with 22 matches, the club did poorly in the first week inside the relegation zone being eleventh then soared to fourth and reached the number one spot on the 11th week and then slipped to 5th in the 15th week and finished second with 46 points, 14 wins and scored 45 goals behind Desportivo and ahead of Sporting also with 46 points but with 13 goals, the most goals scored was Matxona numbering 14. Overall in point totals, it is behind Desportivo's total of 47 set in the same season, Boavista's 46 points became a club record. Sporting also had it in 2013 and are one of the highest in the region and of any island leagues in Cape Verde.

Once again, Nelito Antunes returned to the club as manager in late 2016 but shortly left in January 2017, another return was made with Humberto Bettencourt again manager of the club in two years, their positions were moderate and reached second place at the 13th round but their chances of being champion was slipping and disappeared as Sporting Praia claimed another regional title at the 20th round. In point totals which now number 46, it was shy of their total last season and superseded and made it 49, a club record after defeating almighty Sporting Praia in the Capital Derby, the 21st round match on April 22, Boavista became a second placed club for the season and finished it on April 30. 48 goals were scored, the most in the South Zone and made it a club record and 51 points they achieved.

Boavista started off the new 2017–18 season, but with a loss to Celtic da Praia, currently the only one of the season. Boavista underwent a two match winning streak defeating Tira Chapéu then Travadores. On November 25, they made a scoreless draw with Sporting in the Capital Derby. Boavista currently went on a two match winning streak, they defeated Ribeira Grande, one of the weakest in Santiago South, then the mighty Académica and the ailing Benfica, they were second with 16 points, behind Celtic and ahead of Praia's other top clubs Académica and Sporting. Two more wins were followed and their results got bigger, a 0–6 win over Eugénio Lima, then 7–3 over ADESBA and is currently the region's highest. They had the most goals scored, 25 in nine rounds. Boavista had no official position yet as their match with Desportivo which was for December 23 has not been made as no referees showed up, their match was played on January 9 and was a 3–1 win over Desportivo. Boavista was third place until their win over Tchadense at the 10th round and took Celtic's second-place position at the 11th round, Boavista scored the region's most with 30 goals Boavista attempted their battle to keep their second position, it became a kind of awkward as Boavista lost to a lesser powerful club of Celtic 2–1 and lost a position to third place where they are and thus ended their four-game winning streak. Another win came as they defeated the newcomer in their second challenge with Tira Chapéu with the result 1–0 and took the second position held by Celtic, they are still the leader in goal scoring totaling 32. Boavista met their historically powerful Travadores on February 3 and had a huge win with the score 0–6 and made another match the second highest in Santiago South, their goal total rose to 38. A few rounds later on March 9, Boavista defeated Desportivo 0–4 and had 47 goals which became the club's second behind theirs made last season. Boavista is approaching club records in goals or points, also a possibility is a regional title and a national championship participation. Boavista's next match was with Eugênio Lima and ended in a goal draw, Boavista now has an eight-point difference behind Académica, with two rounds to go, what completely disappeared was another regional title for Boavista alongside Celtic. Boavista's 48 goals now equals to theirs last season. A back to back win came to Boavista as they defeated Bairro 0–3, also Boavista made a goalscoring record of 51. Boavista had one more chance in only tying their record to their last season in wins and goals, they god it at the 22nd round as their final competition of the season was against Tchadense and finished second, the score was 4–1 and also finished with a new record of 55 goals, their club records in points was 51, the same as theirs made last season, also in club records was their 16 wins, another with the same number with their last only made last season.

=== Playoff participation and upper appearances ===
Boa Vista won their only colonial title before summer in 1963 after they defeated Académica do Mindelo, champion of São Vicente with the score 3–0.

After independence, Boa Vista participated at the national championships for the first time in 1976 but lost their chance for their first national title after losing to Fogo's Botafogo in the semis. Boa Vista claimed their first title ever in 1987 even since independence after defeating São Nicolau's SC Atlético 3–1 in the home leg as no goals were scored in the away leg. They entered the finals in 1993 and challenged with Académica (Espargos) to claim its second title. The first match was lost 1–0 to Académica do Sal, then second match was tied at two apiece, after Zé di Letcha tied it at two each, protests then a pitch invasion occurred, Boavista lost all two legs, the second title was not to be claimed until 1995 and won through the triangular phase and contained no playoffs, as Académica do Mindelo withdrew, it was reduced to a single match and Boavista defeated Académica Operária from the island of Boa Vista. It offered Boavista entry to their first and only appearance in the continental level, the African Cup of Champions Clubs 1996, the match with Mauritania's ASC Sonalec was abandoned, their first match was with Algeria's JS Kabylie in the first round and scored only a goal and the club did not advance. In their next championship appearance as they qualified as second place as Sporting Praia, automatically qualified for the 2010 championships as the 2009 winner, Boavista challenged with that club in the championship final in July and winning both legs in the Praia Derby and won the 2010 regional title, Boavista Praia won their third and most recent for the club in 2010 after defeating Sporting Clube of the same city for a total of two goals all scored in the first leg in the second finals that featured two clubs from the same island, even the same city, it did not gained entry into the 2010 CAF Champions League likely to financial concerns. Also it was the club's last champ finals appearance before the restructuring into two phases in 2016 which will be put for the 2017 season. One of the best scorers for the club and the championships that season was Fufuco, he would head on to the Middle East and played in the UAE with Hatta Club next season, the next time he played another club in his nation was in 2016 with this club and later CD Travadores.

Boa Vista once again returned to the playoffs in 2012 and 2015 without heading to the final. In 2015, Matxona scored the most goals in their last national appearance with 6.

So far Boavista Praia appeared 3 times at the finals, played 6 finals matches and scored nine goals at the championship finals.

=== Cape Verdean Cup ===
After winning the island cup title for 2009, Boavista qualified for the Cape Verdean Cup and won their first title, Boavista returned for the last time in 2010 and won their second and recent cup title after being the only club in the final round after defeating Sport Sal Rei Club and Botafogo of São Filipe.

=== Friendly competitions ===
==== Boavista Praia Champion's Cup ====
In 2014, the club celebrated the 75th anniversary and organized the Taça dos Campões (The Cup of Champions) as a friendly match. The first edition featured the greatest clubs from different islands and the club would win the competition. The second edition featured clubs from different nations, Boavista Praia lost. In late October, the third edition was held and featured Cape Verdean teams, two of them were of the island, the other being Sporting Praia, the other two were from the western portion including CS Mindelense and Académica do Fogo. In 2016, Boavista won the second and last title of the competition, the third edition was the last competition.

==== Other ====
Boavista Praia played in the 2017 GAFT Cup being one of the three clubs from the south of the island. They face a club from the same location Desportivo, the only match that featured two of the city's club in the quarterfinals and its two matches. Boavista lost the quarterfinal match 1–2 and did not advance to the semis.

== Stadium ==
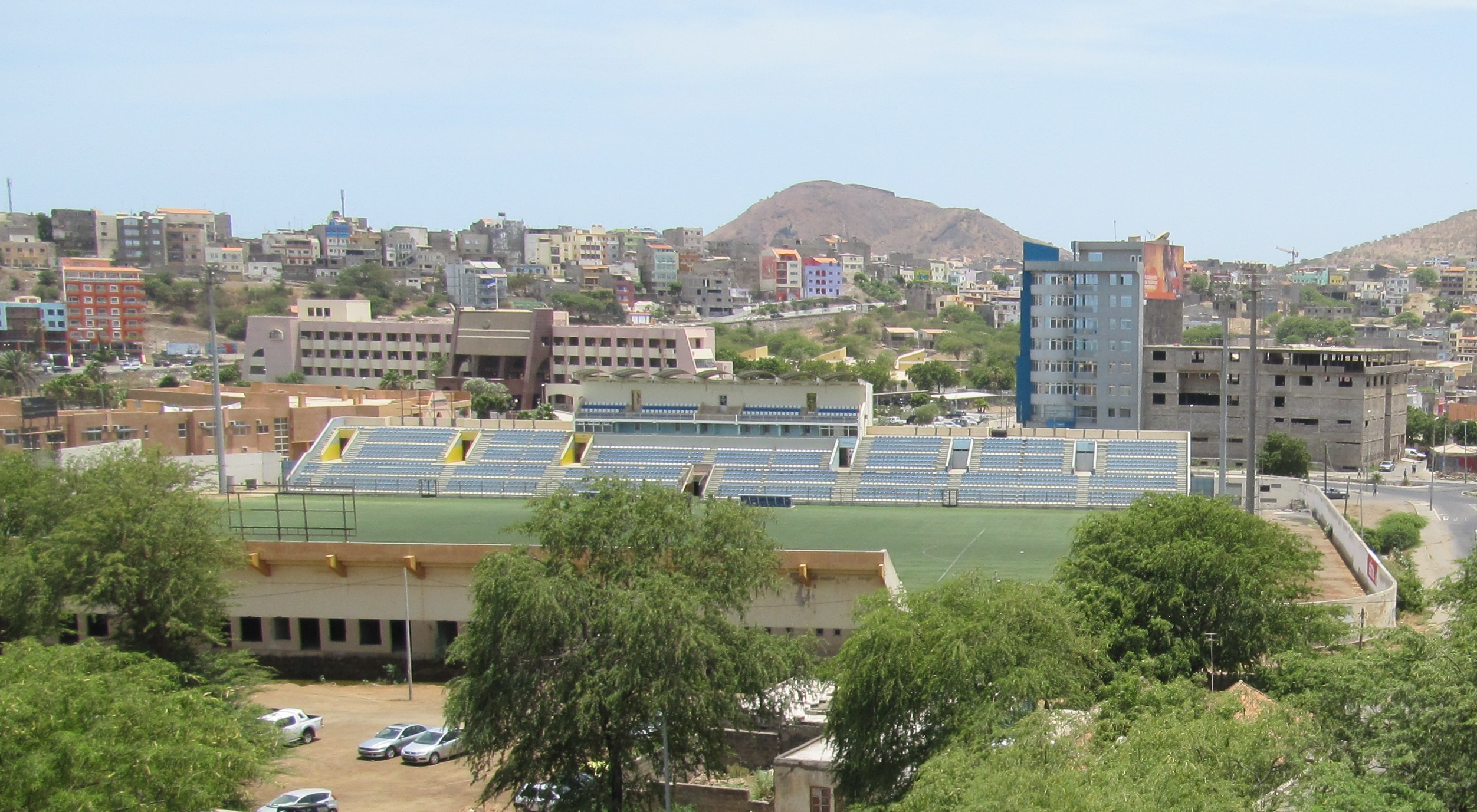
The home stadium of Boavista FC

The club plays at Estádio da Várzea in which Sporting, Travadores and Académica also play, the club also practices at the stadium and Complexo Desportivo Adega at Achada Grande Tras and the neighboring Sucupira.

== Rivalries ==
Their biggest rivalry at the regional level are with Sporting, Travadores, and Académica Praia. All forming the Praia derbies, one of them is titled Praia derby. They are one of the biggest rivalries in Cape Verde with the exception of the one with Académica. As Vitória was listed in the relegation zone at the 19th round of the 2017 season, their secondary rivalry with Vitória had ended.

== Uniform ==
Its uniform color is white with black socks but a black T-shirt with black sleeve rim is used for home games, all with a two-rowed checkered lining on the right. When there is a same uniform color in some parts of the other club, the other uniform color is red with a checkered sleeve and black socks.

Previous uniforms were colored black for home games with a black-white checkered portion T-shirt and white socks and white with black socks for away games.

Home uniform up to 2014
Visitor's uniform up to 2014

== Honours ==
=== National titles ===
- Cape Verdean Championship: 5
  - 1963, 1987, 1995, 2010, 2024
- Cape Verdean Cup: 2
  - 2008/09, 2009/10

=== Regional titles ===
Island/Regional Championships

- Santiago Island League: 6
  - 1962/63, 1975/76, 1982/83, 1986/87, 1992/93, 1994/95
- Santiago South Premier Division: 2
  - 2010/11, 2014/15
- Santiago South/Praia Cup: 4
  - 2008/09, 2009/10, 2010/11, 2014/15
- Santiago South Super Cup: 1
  - 2014/15
- Santiago South Opening Tournament: 1
  - 2003

=== Other titles ===
- Champion's Cup (Taça de Campões):
  - 2014, 2016

== League and cup history ==
=== Performance in African competitions ===
Boavista Praia's results in CAF competition
| Season | Competition | Qualification method | Round | Opposition | Home | Away | Aggregate |
|---|---|---|---|---|---|---|---|
| 1994 | CAF Cup | Runner-up in the Cape Verdean National Championships | Preliminary Round | (Sierra Leone) Diamond Stars | 1–4 | 3–1 | 2–7 |
| 1996 | African Cup of Champions Clubs | Cape Verdean champions | Preliminary Round | (Mauritania) ASC Sonalec (Note: Sonalec withdrew) | canc. | canc. | none |
| 1996 | African Cup of Champions Clubs | Cape Verdean champions | First round | (Algeria) JS Kabylie | 1–2 | 2–0 | 1–4 |

=== Colonial era ===
| Year | Finals | Club | Result |
|---|---|---|---|
| 1963 | Won | Académica do Mindelo | Champion |

=== National championship ===
| Year | Stage | Opposition | Result |
|---|---|---|---|
| 1976 | Semi-finals | Botafogo | Lost |
| 1983 | Semi-finals | Académica Sal Rei | Lost |
| 1987 | Finals | Atlético São Nicolau | Champion |
| 1993 | Finals | Académica do Sal | Finalist |

| Season | Div. | Pos. | Pl. | W | D | L | GS | GA | GD | P | Cup | Notes | Playoffs |
|---|---|---|---|---|---|---|---|---|---|---|---|---|---|
| 1995 | 1B | 1 | 2 | 2 | 0 | 0 | 3 | 0 | +3 | 4 | Not held | Promoted into the final phase | Champion |
| 2009 | | | | | | | | | | | Winner | | |
| 2010 | 1A | 1 | 5 | 2 | 2 | 1 | 15 | 8 | +7 | 8 | Winner | Promoted into playoffs | Champion |
| 2011 | 1B | 3 | 4 | 2 | 1 | 1 | 9 | 4 | +5 | 7 | | Did not advance | Did not participate |
| 2015 | 1B | 2 | 5 | 4 | 0 | 1 | 14 | 4 | +10 | 12 | | Promoted into playoffs | Semi-finalist |

=== Island/Regional Championship ===
| Season | Div. | Pos. | Pl. | W | D | L | GS | GA | GD | P | Cup | Tour | Notes |
|---|---|---|---|---|---|---|---|---|---|---|---|---|---|
| 2002 | 2 | 8 | 18 | 4 | 7 | 7 | 16 | 21 | -5 | 19 | | | |
| 2002–03 | 2 | 2 | 18 | 11 | 2 | 4 | 28 | 12 | +16 | 35 | | Winner | |
| 2003–04 | 2 | 3 | 18 | 10 | 4 | 4 | 35 | 13 | +22 | 34 | | | |
| 2005 | 2 | 6 | 17 | 5 | 8 | 4 | 21 | 16 | +5 | 23 | | | |
| 2005–06 | 2 | 4 | 18 | 6 | 5 | 7 | 22 | 19 | +3 | 23 | | | |
| 2007 | 2 | 4 | 18 | 8 | 6 | 4 | 28 | 17 | +11 | 30 | | | |
| 2007–08 | 2 | 5 | 18 | 8 | 4 | 6 | 33 | 28 | +3 | 28 | | | |
| 2008–09 | 2 | 3 | 18 | 11 | 4 | 3 | 39 | 14 | +15 | 37 | | | |
| 2009–10 | 2 | 2 | 18 | - | - | - | - | - | - | 43 | Winner | | Also promoted into the National Championships |
| 2010–11 | 2 | 1 | 18 | 12 | 2 | 4 | 38 | 13 | +25 | 38 | Winner | | Promoted into the National Championships |
| 2011–12 | 2 | 3 | 18 | 8 | 6 | 4 | 25 | 17 | +8 | 30 | | | |
| 2012–13 | 2 | 3 | 18 | 9 | 3 | 6 | 26 | 17 | +9 | 30 | | | |
| 2013–14 | 2 | 4 | 18 | 9 | 4 | 5 | 29 | 21 | +8 | 31 | | | |
| 2014–15 | 2 | 1 | 18 | 13 | 4 | 1 | 37 | 14 | +23 | 43 | Winner | | Promoted into the National Championships |
| 2015–16 | 2 | 2 | 22 | 14 | 4 | 4 | 45 | 21 | +32 | 46 | Finalist | | |
| 2016–17 | 2 | 2 | 22 | 16 | 3 | 3 | 48 | 13 | +35 | 51 | Round of 8 | | |
| 2017–18 | 2 | 2 | 22 | 16 | 3 | 3 | 55 | 13 | +42 | 51 | 1st round | | |

== Statistics ==
- Best position: First Round (continental)
- Best position at cup competitions: First Round (continental)
- Appearances in the cup competition: 2 (national)
- Appearance in a regional super cup competition: Once, in 2015
- Total goals scored at a regional super cup competition: 1
- Total number of goals scored at the continental level: 3
  - CAF Champions League: 2
  - CAF Cup Winner's Cup: 1
- Total matches played at the continental level: 4
  - CAF Champions League: 2
  - CAF Cup Winner's Cup: 2
- Highest number of wins scored in a season: 16 (regional), in 2017 and 2018
  - Highest number of wins away in a season: 10, in 2018
- Highest number of goals scored in a season:
  - National: 15 (regular season), 19 (total)
  - Regional: 55, in 2018
- Highest number of points in a season:
  - National: 12
  - Regional: 51, in 2017 and 2018

Other:

- Appearance at the GAFT Cup: Once, in 2017

== Players ==
=== Current squad ===
As of March 26, 2017

Note: Flags indicate national team as defined under FIFA eligibility rules; some limited exceptions apply. Players may hold more than one non-FIFA nationality.

| No. | Pos. | Nation | Player |
|---|---|---|---|
| — | | CPV | Adelmiro (Note: Portuguese for Adelmir) Leal Landim |
| — | | CPV | Adilson Furtado |
| — | | CPV | Admilson Gomes Monteiro |
| — | | CPV | Alex Ribeiro Correia |
| — | | CPV | Anilton Jorge V. Sanches |
| — | | CPV | Arlindo (Narcelino (Marcelino) Vaz da Costa) |
| — | | CPV | Edson Cledilson G. Moniz |
| — | | CPV | Luis Henrique Fernandes |
| — | | CPV | Nelson Patrique Furtado |
| — | | CPV | Heritison (Note: Also as Hartison or Hertison) Tavares Monteiro |
| — | | CPV | Jair Mendes Garcia |

| No. | Pos. | Nation | Player |
|---|---|---|---|
| — | | CPV | Emanuel Temitop Jaiyrola |
| — | | CPV | Lito (Paulo Semedo) |
| — | | CPV | Osvaldo Mendes Martins |
| — | | CPV | Nana (Dinilson Duarte) |
| — | | CPV | Roberto Carlos Pereira |
| — | | CPV | Vika (Rosalvo (Cesar G.) Fortes) |
| — | | CPV | Edson Manuel Teixeira |
| — | | CPV | Toyzito (Nelson (L. G.) Martins) |
| — | | CPV | Xibaca (Paulo (Martins) de Pina) |
| — | | CPV | Zequinha (Zeca) Soares |

== Managerial history ==
| Name | Nationality | From | To |
|---|---|---|---|
| Janito | Cape Verde | | 2010 |
| Adriano Barbosa | Cape Verde | 2010 | 2012 |
| Humberto Bettencourt | Cape Verde | 2013 | 2014 |
| Nelito Antunes | Cape Verde | 2014 | September 23, 2015 |
| Joel de Castro | Portugal | September 23, 2015 | October 2016 |
| Nelito Antunes | Cape Verde | October 2016 | January 2017 |
| Humberto Bettencourt | Cape Verde | since January 2017 | |
