= Santiago South Premier Division =

Regional football league in Cape Verde

- Founded: 1999
- Region: Southern Santiago Island, Cape Verde
- Number of clubs: 12 (Premier Division); 10 (Second Division)
- Promotion to: Cape Verdean Football Championship
- Relegation to: Santiago South Second Division
- Current champions: Académica da Praia (3rd time) (2017-18)
- Most championships: Sporting Clube da Praia (10 times)
- Website: Official website

The Santiago South Premier Division is a regional championship played in Santiago Island, Cape Verde and is a part of the Santiago South Zone Football Association. The winner of the championship plays in Cape Verdean football Championships of each season while the last two placed clubs relegates in the following season. In 2007 and 2013 when Sporting Praia automatically qualified in the championships as they won their national titles in the previous season, a second place club qualified to the national championships. The division features 12 clubs in the premier division for the second time, Varanda and Delta were relegated into the Second Division, Tchadense and Benfica were promoted last season.

== History ==
The league was formed after the split of the Santiago Island League into the north and south zones in 2002 and the two are the youngest island leagues in Cape Verde, it featured clubs only from the municipality of Praia, Ribeira Grande de Santiago split in 2005 and featured from two parts up to 2010, clubs from São Domingos switched from the North to the South Zone in 2010, Garridos first played during the 2013–14 season. In the late 2000s and up to mid 2015, the championship/league contained ten clubs in each of the two divisions. The Premier Division risen to twelve clubs started from the 2015–16 season and is the current number today. The championship has the most clubs in the country with the exception of the 2015–16 and the 2016–17 seasons which were second, shared with the island's North Zone. Up to the 2014–15 season, the 11th placed club plays with the second placed Second Division club to decide to remain in the Premier Division or be relegated, the last place club directly relegated into the second division in the following season. Started from the 2015–16 season, the last two placed clubs relegated and the top two Second Division clubs qualified as two clubs in the Second Division were registered for the 2016–17 season.

The reduction of the Santiago North Premier Division's clubs to ten now makes it the sole tier 2 competition having the most clubs in the nation. The 2017–18 season has the second division.

== Title history ==
Every title won are clubs that serves the whole of Praia. The first club won after the breakup was Travadores in 2003, Académica was the second winner in 2004, Sporting Praia won two consecutive titles in 2005 and in 2006. Académica won in 2007, then Sporting in 2008, Académica won two back to back titles in 2009, then Sporting in 2010. Boavista won their first in 2011. Sporting won three consecutive titles, one was their recent in 2014. Boavista won their recent title in 2015. Desportivo won their only title in 2016. Sporting won their tenth title in 2017.

== Records and successes ==
Sporting Praia had the longest streak with only wins which was 19 which lasted from April 3, 2004, to April 10, 2005. Sporting Praia recently surpassed the record point total of 49 in 2005 and had 53 points at the end of the 2016–17 season.

== Clubs of the 2017-18 season ==
The 2017–18 season was the third season featuring twelve clubs.

- Académica - Praia
- ADESBA - Craveiro Lopes neighborhood
- Benfica da Praia
- Boavista Praia
- Celtic - Achadina de Baixo neighborhood
- Desportivo da Praia
- Eugenio Lima - based in the homonymous neighborhood - finished 11, to be relegated
- Ribeira Grande - based in the homonymous municipality and serves Cidade Velha, Porto Gouveia and Porto Mosquito - champion and promoted
- Sporting Praia
- Tchadense - Achada Santo Antônio neighborhood
- Travadores - Praia
- AD Tira Chapéu - based in the homonymous neighborhood the west of Praia - finished last, to be relegated

== Winners ==
- 2002: Sporting Clube da Praia
- 2002/03 : CD Travadores
- 2003/04 : Académica (Praia)
- 2005 : Sporting Clube da Praia
- 2005/06 : Sporting Clube da Praia
- 2007 : Sporting Clube da Praia
- 2007/08 : Sporting Clube da Praia
- 2008/09 : Académica (Praia)
- 2009/10 : Sporting Clube da Praia
- 2010/11 : Boavista FC (Cape Verde)
- 2011/12 : Sporting Praia
- 2012/13 : Sporting Praia
- 2013/14 : Sporting Praia
- 2014/15 : Boavista
- 2015-16: Desportivo da Praia
- 2016–17: Sporting Clube da Praia
- 2017–18: Académica da Praia

=== Performance By Club ===
Club	Winners	Winning years
Sporting Clube da Praia	10	2002, 2005, 2006, 2007, 2008, 2010, 2012, 2013, 2014, 2017
Académica (Praia)	3	2004, 2009, 2018
Boavista FC (Cape Verde)	2	2011, 2015
Desportivo da Praia	1	2016
CD Travadores	1	2003

== Topscorers ==
=== By season ===
Season	Nat.	Name	Goals	Club(s)
2013–14	(Cape Verde)	Márcio		Desportivo da Praia
2015–16	(Cape Verde)	Matxona	16	Boavista da Praia
2015–16	(Cape Verde)	António Correia	14	Sporting Clube da Praia
2015–16	(Cape Verde)	Nildo	13	Académica da Praia
2016–17	(Cape Verde)	Ro	16	Desportivo da Praia
2016–17	(Cape Verde)	Anilton	14	Boavista Praia
2016–17	(Cape Verde)	Paiva Tavares	14	CD Travadores
2016–17	(Nigeria)	Matthew Mbutidem Sunday	13	Sporting Clube da Praia

== Seasons in the Santiago South Premier Division ==
Half listed

The number of seasons that each team (in alphabetical order) has played in the Premier Division from 1999 to 2017. In Brackets are their overall appearances with the Santiago Island (or Regional) Championships. The teams in Bold participating in the 2017-18 Santiago South Premier Division:

Seasons	Clubs
19 (c. 62)	**Académica da Praia**, **Boavista Praia**, **Desportivo da Praia**, **Sporting Praia**, **CD Travadores**
18	**AD Bairro**, **Celtic da Praia**
16 (59)	Vitória
10	GDRC Delta
7	**AD Ribeira Grande**, **Tchadense**
3	Os Garridos
2	**Benfica da Praia**, Vila Nova
1	**Tira Chapéu**

== See also ==
- Sports in Santiago, Cape Verde
- Santiago South Cup
- Santiago South Super Cup
- Santiago South Opening Tournament
