= Vozinha =

Cape Verdean footballer (born 1986)

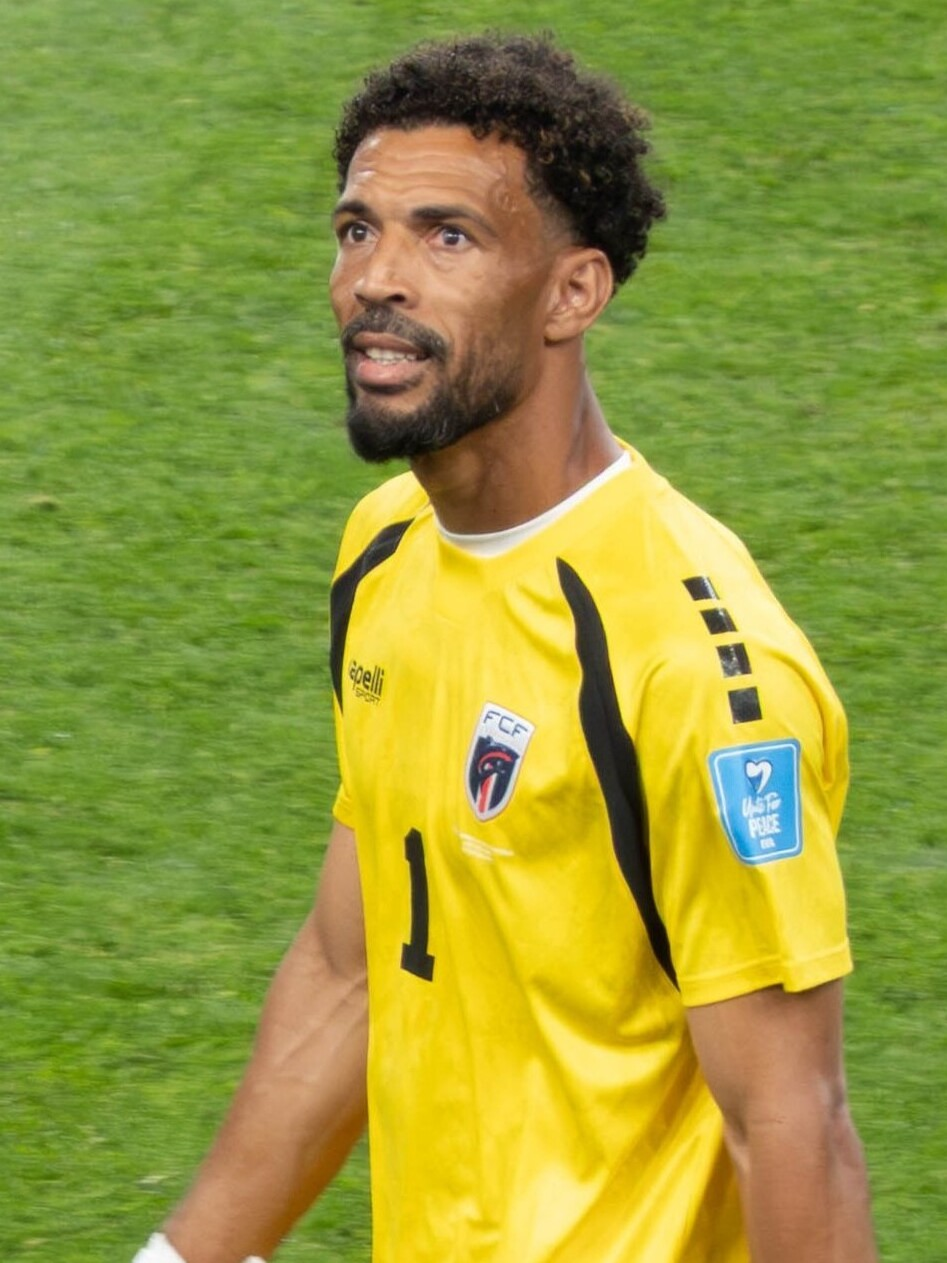
- Vozinha with Cape Verde at the 2026 FIFA World Cup

Personal information
- Full name: Josimar José Évora Dias
- Date of birth: 3 June 1986 (age 40)
- Place of birth: Mindelo, Cape Verde
- Height: 1.89 m (6 ft 2 in)
- Position: Goalkeeper

Team information
- Current team: Colo-Colo
- Number: 29

Youth career
- –2007: Batuque

Senior career*
Years	Team	Apps	(Gls)
2007–2011	Batuque		
2011–2012	CS Mindelense		
2012–2015	Progresso do Sambizanga	51	(0)
2015	CS Mindelense		
2015–2016	Zimbru Chișinău	26	(0)
2016–2017	Gil Vicente	28	(0)
2017–2022	AEL Limassol	116	(0)
2022–2024	AS Trenčín	34	(0)
2024–2026	Chaves	51	(0)
2026–	Colo-Colo	5	(0)

International career^{‡}
2012–	Cape Verde	95	(0)
- * Club domestic league appearances and goals as of 23:24, 8 November 2026 (UTC) ‡ National team caps and goals as of 13 November 2026 (UTC)

Josimar José Évora Dias (Note: Portuguese: [ʒɔ.zi.ˈmaɾ ʒu.ˈzɛ ˈɛ.vu.ɾɐ ˈdi.ɐʃ]) (born 3 June 1986), commonly known as Vozinha, (Note: Kabuverdianu: [vɔ.ˈzi.ɲɐ] — literally "little grandmother" in Cape Verdean Creole) is a Cape Verdean professional footballer who plays as a goalkeeper for Chilean Primera División team Colo-Colo and the Cape Verde national team.

Vozinha's club career has consisted of spells in Cape Verde, Angola, Moldova, Portugal, Cyprus, Slovakia and Chile. A full international since 2012, and the second-highest caps earner in the history of the Cape Verde national team, he has played in five major international tournaments: the Africa Cup of Nations in 2013, 2015, 2021, 2023 and the 2026 FIFA World Cup. Vozinha attracted significant international attention and acclaim for his performances against Spain and Argentina at the 2026 World Cup, including keeping a clean sheet against eventual champions Spain.

== Club career ==
=== Early career ===
Vozinha began playing in the youth ranks of Atlântico on the Cape Verdian island of São Vicente, before progressing through the youth sides of Estoril, Académica do Mindelo, and Batuque. His senior career began with local side Ribeira Bote, followed by a spell at Derby, before he returned to play for Batuque, playing for them until 2011 before moving to local city rivals Mindelense.

In 2012, he was signed by Progresso do Sambizanga in Angola, remaining for three years until the expiration of his contract.

In March 2015, Vozinha returned to Mindelense in the São Vicente Island League, signing for one year. He played all games in the successful Cape Verdean Championship campaign, excluding the final, having already begun finalizing a move abroad. In July 2015, he joined Moldovan National Division club Zimbru Chișinău.

=== Gil Vicente ===
Vozinha moved in August 2016 to Gil Vicente of the Liga Portugal 2, in which he saved five penalties in 32 games, including two against Casa Pia in the Taça de Portugal and two against Benfica B in the league. Although he still had a year remaining on his contract, he agreed to an early termination after his form attracted interest from Cyprus.

=== AEL Limassol ===
In June 2017, he joined Cypriot First Division side AEL Limassol, brought in to replace the departing Venezuelan goalkeeper Rafael Romo. He quickly became a regular starter and featured in AEL's Europa League qualifying campaigns in 2017–18 and 2019–20. His main honour with the club was the Cypriot Cup of 2018–19; he made key saves across both legs of the semi-final against Apollon Limassol before starting the final, a 2–0 win over APOEL that ended a thirty-year wait for the trophy at AEL.

He signed a two-year contract extension in June 2019 following the cup win, with his deal later prolonged again to 2022. By March 2021, Cypriot media identified him as the goalkeeper with the most appearances and greatest longevity at AEL over the preceding decade; that season he had saved four of the eight penalties he faced. He remained with the club for five seasons in total, taking on a leadership role within the squad, before his contract expired on 1 June 2022.

=== Trenčín ===
After leaving Cyprus, Vozinha joined Slovak First League club Trenĉín in August 2022, signing for six months with an option for a further year. He found compatriots Kelvin Pires and Eynel Soares already in the squad. His early integration was slowed by a period of inactivity following an injury and competition from Michal Kukučka, but he gradually established himself as the club's first-choice goalkeeper and one of its senior figures. During the 2023–24 season he kept a clean sheet in thirteen matches and was credited with helping the club avoid relegation, while also being noted for mentoring its younger players. His time at Trenčín ended in July 2024, after 39 official appearances across two seasons.

=== Chaves ===
In July 2024, he returned to Portugal, signing for Liga Portugal 2 side Chaves. In the 2024–25 season he kept eleven clean sheets, a return the club described as the best of any goalkeeper in the competition, and he signed a contract renewal on 5 June 2025. He remained one of the squad's most experienced players and leaders through the following season. On 1 June 2026, approaching his 40th birthday and with his contract expiring, he announced his exit, closing out his second spell in Portuguese football.

=== Colo-Colo ===
On 25 July 2026, it was announced by Chilean Primera División club Colo-Colo that Vozinha was set to join the team on an 18-month contract. The club's president Aníbal Mosa stated "Vozinha will be a Colo-Colo player". Vozinha's flight to Chile scheduled for 28 July was delayed due to issues with his visa. It was postponed to 30 July, at which point Moroccan club RS Berkane made an unsuccessful attempt to hijack the transfer. On 1 August, the ANFP unanimously approved an exemption allowing Vozinha to wear his nickname on the back of his shirt, amending the league rule that previously required players to use only their surnames, following a request backed by Colo-Colo and other Primera División clubs. He arrived in Santiago on 2 August to a warm welcome from supporters before completing the move. On 3 August, Colo-Colo officially announced that Vozinha had signed his contract and become a new player of the club after completing his medical examination earlier that day. He joined on a six-month contract with an option to extend for one year. Later that year, on 8 November, Vozinha won his first Chilean league title as Colo-Colo defeated Ñublense 2–1 to secure their 35th championship with three matches remaining. He made a crucial save in the 97th minute to preserve the victory, which also secured the club's qualification for the 2027 Copa Libertadores.

== International career ==
Vozinha made his debut for the Cape Verde national team in September 2012 in a 2013 Africa Cup of Nations qualification playoff first leg at home to Cameroon, a 2–0 win. He remained in goal for the second leg in Yaoundé on 14 October, a 2–1 loss which saw Cape Verde qualify for its first major tournament. At the finals in South Africa, the team reached the quarterfinals before a 2–0 loss to Ghana. He conceded the second goal after going up for the throw-in in the lulling seconds to attack corner kick.

Vozinha also played at the 2015 Africa Cup of Nations. On 7 October 2020, he earned his 50th cap in a 2–1 friendly win away to Andorra, and a year later he was called up for the 2021 Africa Cup of Nations in Cameroon. He was sent off in the 57th minute of the round-of-16 defeat versus Senegal, after colliding with Sadio Mané with Cape Verde already reduced to ten men. Vozinha was called up once more to play in the 2023 Africa Cup of Nations. Cape Verde reached the quarterfinals of the tournament, eliminating Mauritania 1–0 in the round of 16 before losing to South Africa on penalties following a scoreless draw after extra time.

Vozinha also featured throughout Cape Verde's qualifying campaign for the 2026 World Cup. On 13 October 2025, as captain, he started in a 3–0 win over Eswatini at the National Stadium in the final round-ten match of Group D, a result that secured Cape Verde's first-ever qualification for the FIFA World Cup. He was included in the squad announced for the tournament in May 2026.

Vozinha made his World Cup debut at the 2026 FIFA World Cup for Cape Verde. In the side's first game, Vozinha saved seven shots, securing a 0–0 draw for Cape Verde against Spain, the eventual champion of the tournament. He won the Player of the Match Award for his performance. At 40 years and 12 days old, he became the oldest player to feature in a nation's first FIFA World Cup match – breaking the record that had been set by Curaçao's Eloy Room just a day earlier – and was also the ninth-oldest player to ever feature in the tournament. He also became the third-oldest goalkeeper to keep a clean sheet in a World Cup match, following Peter Shilton and Dino Zoff, and, in the process, moved into second-place among goalkeepers over 40 years old for most saves in a World Cup match on record (since 1966). On 26 June, he kept another clean sheet in a goalless draw against Saudi Arabia, helping his country qualify for the knockout stage as group runners-up. In the Round of 32, Vozinha saved eight shots against defending champions Argentina in a 3–2 loss in extra time. Vozinha's performance was lauded by fans and the media, and he was named a "hero" for Cape Verde. Following the end of the tournament, Vozinha was voted into the Dream XI all-star team by fans.

== Personal life ==
Vozinha's parents wanted to name him Valdano after Argentina footballer Jorge Valdano, but it was not permitted by Cape Verdean authorities. He was given his first name in honour of Josimar, a full-back for Brazil at the 1986 FIFA World Cup. As his father was in the military and his mother worked long hours, he was raised by his grandparents and received his first nickname — Avó — meaning "Granny", for complaining to them when things did not go his way when he was playing as a child. He said that he played under his first name until he moved to Angola, where another goalkeeper was also called Josimar.

Vozinha's younger brother, Delmiro, was also a Cape Verdean player and played for several clubs in the Cypriot Second Division. His other brother, Kleidir, is a mathematics teacher in Brazil.

Vozinha gained over 17 million Instagram followers days after his FIFA World Cup debut against Spain, following coverage by Brazilian broadcaster CazéTV and Portuguese broadcaster LivemodeTV, and a united campaign to help the goalkeeper reach 1 million followers to celebrate his performance. He now has over 29.5 million followers as of July 2026.

Following Vozinha's performance against Spain in the 2026 FIFA World Cup, a newly identified species of sea slug from the Aldisa genus, discovered near Guadalupe Island, was named Aldisa vozinhai after him.

== Career statistics ==
=== Club ===
As of match played 8 November 2026

Appearances and goals by club, season and competition
Club	Season	League			National cup		Other		Total	
Club	Season	Division	Apps	Goals	Apps	Goals	Apps	Goals	Apps	Goals
Zimbru Chișinău	2015–16	Moldovan Liga	26	0	—		—		26	0
Gil Vicente	2016–17	Liga Portugal 2	28	0	3	0	1	0	32	0
AEL Limassol	2017–18	Cypriot First Division	35	0	0	0	6	0	41	0
AEL Limassol	2018–19	Cypriot First Division	13	0	0	0	—		13	0
AEL Limassol	2019–20	Cypriot First Division	23	2	2	0	2	0	27	0
AEL Limassol	2020–21	Cypriot First Division	34	0	5	0	—		39	0
AEL Limassol	2021–22	Cypriot First Division	11	0	0	0	4	0	15	0
AEL Limassol	Total		116	0	7	0	12	0	135	0
AS Trenčín	2022–23	Slovak First League	9	0	5	0	—		14	0
AS Trenčín	2023–24	Slovak First League	25	0	0	0	—		25	0
AS Trenčín	Total		34	0	5	0	—		39	0
Chaves	2024–25	Liga Portugal 2	32	0	0	0	—		32	0
Chaves	2025–26	Liga Portugal 2	19	0	0	0	—		19	0
Chaves	Total		51	0	0	0	—		51	0
Colo-Colo	2026	Liga de Primera	5	0	1	0	—		6	0
Career total			260	0	16	0	13	0	289	0

=== International ===
As of match played 13 November 2026

Appearances and goals by national team and year
National team	Year	Apps	Goals
Cape Verde	2012	2	0
Cape Verde	2013	10	0
Cape Verde	2014	6	0
Cape Verde	2015	10	0
Cape Verde	2016	6	0
Cape Verde	2017	6	0
Cape Verde	2018	2	0
Cape Verde	2019	4	0
Cape Verde	2020	3	0
Cape Verde	2021	7	0
Cape Verde	2022	3	0
Cape Verde	2023	8	0
Cape Verde	2024	10	0
Cape Verde	2025	9	0
Cape Verde	2026	9	0
Total		95	0

== Honours ==
CS Mindelense

- Cape Verdean Football Championship: 2015

AEL Limassol

- Cypriot Cup: 2018–19

Colo-Colo

- Primera División de Chile: 2026

Individual

- FIFA World Cup Dream XI: 2026

Awards

- New species of sea slug named after him, Aldisa vozinhai
