= São Vicente Regional Football Association =

- Founded: c. 1938
- Locations: Mindelo; Estádio Municipal Adérito Sena
- President: Júlio do Rosário
- Affiliations: Cape Verdean Football Federation
- Website: Official website
- Remarks: Domestic cup: São Vicente Cup; São Vicente SuperCup; São Vicente Association Cup

São Vicente Regional Football Association (Portuguese: Associação Regional de Futebol de São Vicente, abbreviation: ARFSV) is a football (soccer) association covering the island of São Vicente. It is headquartered in the city of Mindelo, the island capital.

== About the Island/Regional League ==
The area includes the northwest central part of Cape Verde (especially the three islands of Santa Luzia, Ilhéu Branco and Ilhéu Raso which are not populated today are included in area, though the name of other isles are not used, also there are no clubs in that area).

== Organization ==
The association also organizes and functions the São Vicente Regional Championships, the Cup, the Super Cup, the Association Cup and now the Champions' Cup (equivalent to the Champions' Trophy). The association has 14 registered clubs, Mindelense and Derby are pro-clubs and Académica Mindelo could be a semi-pro club. The regional champion competes in the National Championships each season, once did in the cup (2007) and super cup (2014) competition who competed at the national level. The regional championships has two divisions.

- São Vicente Premier Division (8 clubs)
- São Vicente Second Division (6 clubs)

== History ==
The island league was founded in 1938 and is the oldest and existing association in Cape Verde. In the founding years, the league formerly included much of the Barlavento Islands, when more clubs were created even the other islands, it reduced the area to only the northwestern and then the northwestcentral part of the country. None of the clubs outside the island participated in the island division before their island divisions were created. In its first three seasons, only a single match existed, Académica and GD Amarantes were founded later and the number of clubs risen to four.

The two island competitions were the highest level local championship in Cape Verde. The island had the second largest championships in the country in 1953 which lasted to the late 2000s. The 1953 island champion who was Académica would compete in the first colonial championship and claimed the first colonial title. The only entrant was a club from the island of São Vicente up to the end of colonial rule. Some clubs were created years later including Castilho and Falcões do Norte in the 1960s and increased its clubs to six, the points system was introduced and featured a ten-match season that started in the early of the year. After Batuque was founded, the club number rise to eight and nine in around 1990 after Corinthians who was the first Brazilian based club on the island was founded in 1988, it started a sixteen match season and had a two-year season.

In 1999, the São Vicente Opening Tournament was founded, later in 2001 the São Vicente Cup was founded and in 2004, its Super Cup competitions were founded. In 2007, the Opening Tournament became labelled as the Association Cup. In 2009, the Association Cup would have two divisions featuring clubs that also feature in a division of the championships.

After Santiago Island League South or Fogo, it would be the next league to have a second division in 2008. Once the clubs were only around Mindelo and was the remaining one in Cape Verde, a few clubs were added and are based in other parts of the island including Calhau in the east, Salamansa in the north and São Pedro in the southwest. Also Corinthians São Vicente competed in that division for the first time.

Recently of club participations in the Premier Division, since May 8, 2016, only four are unrelegated and are Mindelense, Batuque, Derby and Falcões do Norte. Calhau, Corinthians and São Pedro are the only clubs who appeared only in the Second Division.

Between the late 2000s and 2015, the Championship had the third largest number of clubs, currently the League has the fourth most number of clubs in the country.

== Registered clubs ==
The region's registered clubs as of 2014 include:

Club	Location	Founded	Registered
Académica do Mindelo	Mindelo	1940	1941
Amarante	Mindelo	1930s	1938
Batuque	Mindelo	1981	1995
Calhau	Calhau		2007
Castilho	Mindelo	1923	1938
SC Corinthians	Mindelo	1987	2007
Derby	Mindelo	1929	1938
Falcões	Chã de Alecrim, Mindelo	1960	1961
Farense	Fonte Filipe, Mindelo		2007
Mindelense	Mindelo	1919	1922
Ponta Pon (or Ponta Pom)	Ponta de Pom, Mindelo		2007
Ribeira Bote	Mindelo-Ribeira Bote		
Salamansa	Salamansa (Note: The club area serves Lameirão, Baías das Gatas and Norte)		2007
São Pedro	São Pedro		2007

== Presidents ==
- Benvindo Leston (up to 2014–15 season)
- Júlio do Rosário (since the end of the 2014–15 season)
