= 1999 Cape Verdean Football Championships =

Cape Verdean Football Championship
- Season: 1999
- Champions: GD Amarantes
- Matches played: 21
- Goals scored: 52 (2.48 per match)
- Biggest home win: GD Amarantes, Solpontense
- Biggest away win: several clubs

The 1999 Cape Verdean Football Championship season was the 20th of the competition of the first-tier football in Cape Verde. The tournament was organized by the Cape Verdean Football Federation. GD Amarantes won their first and only title. Sporting Clube da Praia would be the only time that a non-winning title would participate in the 2000 CAF Champions League, the criteria for qualification was not continued. No club took part in the 2000 CAF Winners' Cup.

== Overview ==
CS Mindelense was the defending team of the title. A total of 8 clubs participated in the competition, one from each island league, no club came from Santiago Island as the competition was cancelled for the season. The season had 6 matches in Group A but a shorter 2 and 3 matches in Group B, it was the first ever season with twice the meetings with each club of the group, occurred in only one croup, the next time it was done was in 2017 with the club and the first in each of the three groups.

The league was contested by 8 teams with GD Amarantes winning the championship. New records were made, Amarantes finished with a new record with 13 points since the points per win risen to three in the nation, Juventude got 10 points, at the time, it became the second highest point in the championships. Two years later, the highest point record was superseded by Onze Unidos. In goal numbers, Solpontense scored the most with 14 and was a record at the national championships, it was superseded in 2001 by Botafogo.

It marked the last appearance of GD Amarantes at the top-level competition.

== Participants ==

Participating football (soccer) clubs of the 1999 Cape Verdean Football Championships (Cape Verde)
- Académica Operária, winner of the Boa Vista Island League
- Nô Pintcha, winner of the Brava Island League
- Vulcânicos FC, winner of the Fogo Island League
- Onze Unidos, winner of the Maio Island League
- Juventude, winner of the Sal Island League
- Solpontense Futebol Clube, winner of the Santo Antão Island League
- FC Ultramarina, winner of the São Nicolau Island League
- GD Amarantes, winner of the São Vicente Island League

=== Information about the clubs ===
Club	Location
Académica Operária	Sal Rei
GD Amarantes	Mindelo
Juventude	Espargos
Nô Pintcha	Nova Sintra
Onze Unidos	Vila do Maio
Solpontense Futebol Clube	Ponta do Sol
FC Ultramarina	Tarrafal de São Nicolau
Vulcânicos	São Filipe

== League standings ==
=== Group A ===
Pos	Team	Pld	W	D	L	GF	GA	GD	Pts
1	GD Amarantes	6	4	1	1	8	5	+3	13
2	Juventude	6	3	1	2	9	11	-2	10
3	Solpontense Futebol Clube	6	2	2	2	14	8	+6	8
4	FC Ultramarina	6	0	2	4	3	10	-7	2

Club	Ama	JuvS	Solp	Ultr
GD Amarantes		4-0	2-1	0-0
Juventude (Sal)	2-0		2-2	2-1
Solpontense Futebol Clube	1-2	4-0		4-0
FC Ultramarina	--+	0-2	2-2	

=== Group B ===
Pos	Team	Pld	W	D	L	GF	GA	GD	Pts
1	Vulcânicos FC	3	1	2	0	6	3	+3	5
2	Académica Operária	3	1	2	0	5	4	+1	5
3	Onze Unidos	2	0	1	1	2	3	-1	1
4	Nô Pintcha	2	0	1	1	1	4	-3	1

Club	Vul	Aop	Onze	NôPi
Vulcânicos		1-0	3-1	1-0
Académica Operária	1-1		3-1	+--
Onze Unidos	0-2	2-0		--+
Nô Pintcha	1-2	1-1	3-1	

== Finals ==
GD Amarantes	2:0	Vulcânicos FC

Estádio Municipal Adérito Sena
Mindelo on São Vicente Island

Vulcânicos FC	1:1	GD Amarantes

Estádio 5 de Julho
São Filipe on Fogo Island

Cape Verdean Football 1999
Champions
GD Amarantes
1st title
