= Kevin Sousa (footballer) =

Cape Verdean footballer (born 1994)

Kéven Sousa
Personal information
- Full name: Kéven Jorge Sousa Ramos
- Date of birth: 6 June 1994 (age 32)
- Place of birth: Praia, Cape Verde
- Height: 1.88 m (6 ft 2 in)
- Position: Goalkeeper

Team information
- Current team: Batuque FC

Youth career
- 2012–2013: Nacional

Senior career*
Years	Team	Apps	(Gls)
2010–2011	Batuque FC		
2011–2012	Académica do Mindelo		
2013–2014	Oeiras	16	(1)
2014	Alcanenense	11	(0)
2014–2016	Nacional	0	(0)
2016–2017	Académica do Mindelo		
2017–	Batuque FC		

International career^{‡}
2014–	Cape Verde	1	(0)
- * Club domestic league appearances and goals as of 11:58, 2 January 2015 (UTC) ‡ National team caps and goals as of 11:58, 2 January 2015 (UTC)

Kéven Jorge Sousa Ramos (born 6 June 1994) is a Cape Verdean footballer who plays as a goalkeeper.

== Career ==
On 19 November 2014, Ken made his international debut against Zambia. He was included in the national squad for 2015 Africa Cup of Nations.
