= 2016–17 São Vicente Association Cup =

São Vicente Association Cup
- Season: 2016-17
- Champions: Batuque FC
- Runner up: FC Derby
- Matches played: 28
- Goals scored: 81 (2.89 per match)

The 2016–17 São Vicente Association Cup season was the 15th of the competition of the Association Cup (equivalent to a League Cup used in other countries, e.g. nearby Senegal) of football in the island of São Vicente, Cape Verde. All of the competition took place in late 2016, the Premier Division of the cup started on October 29 and finished on December 11 and the Second Division of the cup started in December and finished on January 29. The tournament was organized by the São Vicente Regional Football Association (Associação Regional de São Vicente de Futebol, ARSVF). Batuque won their only title for the season.

== Overview ==
Amarante was the defending team of the title. A total of eight clubs competed in the competition and challenged with a different club once in its seven rounds. All of the clubs were also that would participate in its regional Premier Division later in January 2017.

In the Premier Division, Derby scored the most goals numbering 16, followed by Batuque with 12 and last was Salamansa with only six. A total of 81 goals were scored.

In its Second Division, São Pedro won the title for the season.

It marked the final appearance of Falcões do Norte at the Premier Division of the Association Cup, they will spend their first season at the Second Division of the Association Cup.

== Participating clubs ==
=== Premier Division ===
- Académica
- Batuque FC
- FC Derby
- Farense
- Falcões do Norte
- CS Mindelense
- Ribeira Bote
- Salamansa

=== Second Division ===
- Amarantes
- Calhau
- Castilho
- Corinthians
- Ponta d’Pom
- São Pedro

== Association Cup standings ==
=== Premier Division ===
Pos	Team	Pld	W	D	L	GF	GA	GD	Pts
1	Batuque FC	7	5	2	0	12	6	+6	17
2	FC Derby	7	5	1	1	16	5	+11	16
3	CS Mindelense	7	4	3	0	10	5	+5	15
4	Ribeira Bote	7	3	2	2	12	10	+2	11
5	Falcões do Norte	7	2	2	3	11	11	0	8
6	Académica do Mindelo	7	2	1	4	7	11	-4	7
7	Salamansa	7	0	2	5	6	16	-10	2
8	Farense	7	0	1	6	7	20	-13	1

=== Second Division ===
- 1st place: São Pedro

São Vicente Association Cup 2016-17
Winner
Batuque FC
1st title

== See also ==
- 2016–17 São Vicente Island League
