= São Vicente Super Cup =

- Founded: 2004
- Region: São Vicente, Cape Verde
- Current champions: FC Derby (2nd time)
- Most championships: CS Mindelense (4 times)

The São Vicente Super Cup is a regional SuperCup competition played during the season in São Vicente Island, Cape Verde. The super cup competition is organized by the São Vicente Regional Football Association (Associação Regional de São Vicente de Futebol, ARSVF). Its current champions is FC Derby who won their second title The regional champion competes with the cup champion. The 2015 edition was held, as Mindelense won both the regional and cup titles, the regional winner competed with a runner up in the regional cup.

CS Mindelense has the most Super Cup titles with four, one ahead of Batuque, second in totals in three. Third now in totals is FC Derby with two, Académica do Mindelo and Falcões do Norte are fourth and last with a title each.

FC Derby was the first Super Cup winner won in 2005. Batuque won two consecutive Super Cup titles in 2009 and 2010, Mindelense became the second to win two consecutive titles in 2015 and 2016. FC Derby won their second and recent title in 2017.

The 2018 edition which will take place later at the end of the season will feature the champion Mindelense and the cup winner Batuque.

== Winners ==
Season	Winner	Score	Runner-up	Venue
2004–05	FC Derby		Ribeira Bote	Estádio Municipal Adérito Sena
2005–06	CS Mindelense	1–0	Batuque FC	Estádio Municipal Adérito Sena
2006–07	Académica (Mindelo) (Note: Took place in 2008)		FC Derby	Estádio Municipal Adérito Sena
2007–08	not held			
2008–09	CS Mindelense	3–0 ^{1}	FC Derby	Estádio Municipal Adérito Sena
2009–10	Batuque FC (Note: Took place in 2011)		Académica do Mindelo	Estádio Municipal Adérito Sena
2010–11	not held			
2011–12	Batuque FC		Falcões do Norte	Estádio Municipal Adérito Sena
2012–13	Falcões do Norte (Note: Second place cup winner)		CS Mindelense	Estádio Municipal Adérito Sena
2013–14	Batuque FC		FC Derby	Estádio Municipal Adérito Sena
2014–15	CS Mindelense		Amarante (Note: Second place cup winner)	Estádio Municipal Adérito Sena
2015–16	CS Mindelense	3–1	Salamansa FC	Estádio Municipal Adérito Sena
2016–17	FC Derby	2–1	CS Mindelense	Estádio Municipal Adérito Sena

^{1}Mindelense was awarded 3-0 after Derby forfeited the Super Cup match

=== Performance By Club ===
Club	Winners	Winning years
CS Mindelense	4	2006, 2008, 2015, 2016
Batuque FC	3	2010, 2012, 2014
FC Derby	2	2005, 2017
Académica (Mindelo)	1	2007
Falcões do Norte	1	2013

== See also ==
- Sports in São Vicente, Cape Verde
- São Vicente Premier Division
- São Vicente Cup
- São Vicente Association Cup
