= Fredson =

Fredson is a given name and surname. Notable people with the name include:

- Fredson (footballer, born 1981), full name Fredson Câmara Pereira, Brazilian footballer
- Fredson (footballer, born 1991), full name Fredson Vinícius Santos Oliveira, Brazilian footballer
- Fredson Paixão (born 1979), Brazilian martial artist
- Fredson Rodrigues (born 1988), Cape Verdean footballer
- John Fredson (1896–1945), Alaskan tribal leader

== See also ==
- Fred (disambiguation)
