= São Vicente Cup =

São Vicente Island Cup
- Founded: 2000
- Region: São Vicente Island, Cape Verde
- Teams: 14
- Current champions: Batuque FC (6th time)
- Most championships: Batuque FC (5)

The São Vicente Island Cup (Portuguese: Taça/Copa da Ilha de São Vicente, Capeverdean Crioulo, ALUPEC or ALUPEK: Tasa/Kopa da Idja di Sau Visenti) is cup competition played during the season in the island of São Vicente, Cape Verde, it consists of all the clubs from all the two regional divisions and are divided into about five to six rounds. The cup tournament is organized by the São Vicente Regional Football Association (Associação Regional de São Vicente de Futebol, ARSVF). The cup winner competed in the regional super cup final in the following season. For several seasons, the winner qualified into Cape Verdean Cup which has been cancelled due to financial and scheduling reasons.

Batuque won the most cup titles numbering six, second is Derby with four, third is Mindelense with three, fourth is Falcões do Norte with four and last are Académica do Mindelo, Ribeira Bote and Salamansa.

Its recent cup winner is Batuque who won their next cup title after defeating Derby on May 6.

== Winners ==
Season	Winner	Score	Runner-up
2000/01	Batuque FC		
2002/03	Ribeira Bote		
2003/04	FC Derby		
2004/05	FC Derby		SC Ribeira Bote
2005/06	Batuque FC		
2006/07	FC Derby		
2007/08	CS Mindelense	0–0 (5–3 p)	Académica do Mindelo
2008/09	Batuque FC		
2009/10	Batuque FC		Académica do Mindelo
2010-11	Falcões do Norte		
2011-12	Falcões do Norte		
2012/13	CS Mindelense	1–0 (aet)	Falcões do Norte
2013/14	Batuque FC		Derby
2014/15	CS Mindelense		Amarante
2015/16	Salamansa FC		Mindelense
2016-17	FC Derby	1–1 (4–3 p)	Mindelense
2017-18	Batuque FC	0–0 (4–3 p)	FC Derby

=== Performance By Club ===
Club	Winners	Winning years
Batuque FC	6	2000/01, 2005/06, 2008/09 2009/10, 2013/14, 2017/18
Derby FC	4	2003/04, 2004/05, 2006/07, 2016/17
CS Mindelense	3	2007/08, 2012/13, 2014/15
Falcões do Norte	2	2010/11, 2011/12
Académica do Mindelo	1	2008/09
Ribeira Bote	1	2001/02
Salamansa FC	1	2015/16

=== Performance by area ===
Settlement or city	Area	Winning years
Mindelo	16	2001, 2003, 2004, 2005, 2006, 2007, 2008, 2009, 2010, 2011, 2012, 2013, 2014, 2015, 2017, 2018
Salamansa	1	2016

== See also ==
- São Vicente SuperCup
- São Vicente Opening Tournament
- São Vicente Island League
- Sports in São Vicente, Cape Verde
