= Edivândio =

Cape Verdean footballer (born 1991)

Personal information
- Full name: Edivândio Sequeira Reis
- Date of birth: 1 January 1991 (age 35)
- Place of birth: Mindelo, Cape Verde
- Height: 1.82 m (6 ft 0 in)
- Position: Forward

Youth career
- 2009: Batuque FC
- 2009–2010: Marítimo

Senior career*
Years	Team	Apps	(Gls)
2010–2014	Marítimo	5	(0)
2010−2014	Marítimo B	102	(16)
2014–2015	Beira-Mar	29	(5)
2015–2016	Zimbru Chișinău	7	(3)
2016–2017	Felgueiras 1932	8	(1)
2017	UD Oliveirense	10	(4)
2017–2018	Salgueiros	14	(3)
2019	SCM Gloria Buzău		
- * Club domestic league appearances and goals as of 2 July 2019

Edivândio Sequeira dos Reis (born 1 January 1991), commonly known as Edivândio is a Cape Verdean footballer who plays as a forward.

== Football career ==
Edivândio has played 5 games with Marítimo in the Liga Sagres.

== Honours ==
SCM Gloria Buzău

- Liga III: 2018–19
