= Fredson Rodrigues =

Cape Verdean footballer

Fredson
Personal information
- Full name: Fredson Marcelo Andrade Rodrigues
- Date of birth: 31 January 1988 (age 38)
- Place of birth: São Vicente, Cape Verde
- Height: 1.75 m (5 ft 9 in)
- Position: Midfielder

Team information
- Current team: Académica Mindelo

Youth career
- 2006–2007: Porto

Senior career*
Years	Team	Apps	(Gls)
2007–2009	Varzim	1	(0)
2008–2009	→ Pampilhosa (loan)	13	(0)
2010–2013	Batuque		
2014	Mindelense		
2015–	Académica Mindelo		
- * Club domestic league appearances and goals as of 22 January 2017

Fredson Marcelo Andrade Rodrigues (born 31 January 1988 in São Vicente), known simply as Fredson, is a Cape Verdean footballer who plays for Académica do Mindelo as a midfielder.
