= São Vicente Association Cup =

São Vicente Island Association Cup
- Founded: 1999
- Region: São Vicente Island, Cape Verde
- Teams: 14; 8 in the Premier Division; 6 in the Second Division
- Current champions: Batuque FC (1st time)
- Most championships: CS Mindelense (7 titles)

The São Vicente Association Cup (Portuguese: Taça de Associação de São Vicente, Capeverdean Crioulo, ALUPEC or ALUPEK: Tasa di Assosiason di San Visenti), then known as the São Vicente Opening Tournament is an association cup (equivalent to a league cup) played during the season in the island of São Vicente, Cape Verde. The competition is organized by the São Vicente Regional Football Association (Associação Regional de São Vicente de Futebol, ARSVF). Until 2009, it featured 9 rounds and the club met once. When the second division was introduced to the São Vicente Island League in 2009, the Opening Tournament became the Association Cup and featured two divisions. It currently consists of seven rounds, a meeting with another club once. The winner with the most points is the winner.

Mindelense won the most title numbering seven, it was the first club to win a title, their last was in 2013. Derby became the second club to win in 2001. Académica Mindelo became the third club to win a title in the following year. Falcões do Norte was the fourth club to do so in 2004. Mindelense twice won back to back from 2005 to 2009, between, Académica won their second title in 2007. The 2010 edition was cancelled. Derby won two back to back titles in 2012, Mindelense won their recent title in 2013. The 2013-14 and the 2014-15 editions were cancelled, the latter was all the two divisions. For the 2015-16 season which took place in January 2016, Amarante became the fifth club to win a title. In December 2016, Batuque became the sixth club to win a title for the 2016-17 season.

Fifteen titles has won Mindelense has 7 titles, in 2013 it was half, now it is less than half numbering 46.67% out of 15 titles. Derby is next which has three, 1/5 of the total. Third is Académica Mindelo with two. Three remaining has only a title won including Falcões do Norte, Amarante and recently Batuque

== Winners ==
=== Premier Division ===
Season	Winner	Runner-up
1999-2000	CS Mindelense	
2000-01	FC Derby	
2001-02	Académica do Mindelo	
2002-03	CS Mindelense	
2003-04	Falcões do Norte	
2004-05	CS Mindelense	
2005-06	CS Mindelense	
2006-07	Académica do Mindelo	FC Derby
2007-08	Batuque FC	CS Mindelense
2008-09	CS Mindelense	
2009-10	not held	
2010-11	FC Derby	
2011-12	FC Derby	
2012-13	CS Mindelense	Falcões do Norte
2013-14	not held	
2014-15	not held	
2015-16	GD Amarante	
2016-17 (Note: The competition began in October and finished in mid-December in 2016)	Batuque FC	FC Derby
2017	CS Mindelense	FC Derby

==== Performance By Club ====
Club	Winners	Winning years
CS Mindelense	7	1999–00, 2002–03, 2004–05, 2005–06, 2008–09, 2012–13, 2017
FC Derby	3	2000-01, 2010-11, 2011-12
Académica do Mindelo	2	2001-02, 2006-07
Batuque FC	1	2007–08, 2016-17
GD Amarante	1	2015-16
Falcões do Norte	1	2003-04

=== Second Division ===
- 2016/17: São Pedro
- 2017-18: CD Falcões do Norte

== See also ==
- Sports in São Vicente, Cape Verde
- São Vicente Premier Division
- São Vicente Second Division
- São Vicente Cup
- São Vicente SuperCup
