= Cape Verdean Football Championship =

Football competition held in Cape Verde

- Founded: 1976
- Country: Cape Verde
- Confederation: CAF
- Number of clubs: 12
- Level on pyramid: 1
- Domestic cup(s): Cape Verdean Cup; Independence Cup
- International cup(s): CAF Champions League; CAF Confederation Cup
- Current champions: GD Palmeira de Santa Maria (2nd title) (2025)
- Most championships: CS Mindelense (13)
- Broadcasters: TCV and RTP África
- Current: 2025 Cape Verdean Football Championships

The Cape Verdean Football Championship or the Campeonato Caboverdiano de Futebol is a football competition that was created in 1976 in Cape Verde. A local championship was founded in 1953 before independence, when the islands were still part of the Portuguese Empire.

== History ==
=== Before independence ===
The first football championship that was not official took place in 1938 and were colonial and later provincial, only clubs from São Vicente participated, they were actual insular championships. The first official championships began in 1953 and featured clubs from only the islands of São Vicente (along with its surroundings) and Santiago took part. For the next 21 years they occurred and Académica do Mindelo won the first title, Mindelense was the second club to win a title and from 1956 the leader in the number of titles for the remainder of Portuguese rule, Académica Mindelo was second with three titles and Sporting Praia and Travadores with two, Castilho, Académica Praia and Boavista had a single title.

=== Since independence ===
No competition occurred during the end of Portuguese rule and the independence of Cape Verde. Clubs from other islands started to compete in the finals. Mindelense won the first title for an independent Cape Verde, the club lead in the most titles, in the first national championships, Mindelense faced Botafogo from Fogo, the first to feature a club outside Santiago or São Vicente. The 1978 national championships was cancelled as the winner of Sotavento was undecided to challenge Mindelense, the winner of the Barlavento Islands, the finals system was introduced in 1979. Mindelense challenged Botafogo in the final match for the next two years, Botafogo won in 1980 and became the first championship outside Sâo Vicente and Santiago, Mindelense won again in 1981. Clubs from Boa Vista competed in 1980. In 1984, FC Derby faced Académica do Sal in the first finals with two clubs from the same island chain. SC Morabeza was the first club from Brava to compete in the national championships in 1985, the next champion from Brava to compete would not be until 1993.

The group system was introduced in around the 1990s and had two to three matches each. Clubs from the island of Maio would compete in 1990 and Santo Antão would compete in 1993. The triangular system was introduced and was used in 1994 and 1995, the finals was restored again, for one season in 1997, the final phase was introduced and the winner was decided on the highest number of points and Mindelense won, the finals restored again in 1998 and 1999, for the next three seasons, the winner was decided on a total number of points and sometimes goals, Sporting and Batuque shared a record total of 19 points won at the national championships, no other club surpassed it since. Since 2003, the winner would be decided to go to the playoffs on the number of points or goals from each of the two groups. One champion from each island participated in the championships, that time the Santiago and Santo Antâo championships split into two zones. The champion would play for the following season, sometimes a champion who wins a regional league in the follow season, a second placed club participates.

In the 2005 season, Sporting Praia defeated Desportivo Estância Baixo 13-0 and made it the highest scoring match that still stands to date, also Sporting Praia scored the most goals in the championship numbering 35 and still stands today, Derby was second who scored 32, Derby would claim their third and last title for the club. Sporting Praia won their second consecutive title after defeating Académica do Mindelo under the away goals rule as both clubs were tied with a goal in the second final match. In 2015, the FCF chose to keep the group system instead of alterations probably including only the introduction of the first and second tier levels. Mindelense has now a record twelve national titles since 2016 and was their last won, Sporting Praia is second since 2014. The island of Sâo Vicente has now 17 titles won by different clubs, at the time three more than Santiago, two titles won by clubs from Boa Vista and one each from Fogo, Maio and Sal. For some seasons, some of the clubs from a regional league did not participated, its recent one was Brava in 2011.

In regular season competition, in 2008, Derby was the first club to have all five wins along with not a single loss or a draw after the creation of a six club group system, the second was SC Atlético in 2012, and the third was Mindelense in 2015 and also conceded only a goal while the club scored fourteen, the first after the creation of a six club group system, Derby did not conceded a goal in a regular season in 2001, also Derby won all five and was their second and recent time in 2015.

The 2017 season revived the triangular phase and is the first featuring three groups and together with a playoff system, the top three of each group will qualify into the semis along with the second placed club with the most points. The champion will compete in the 2018 CAF Champions League in the following season. As the Malian Premier League was abandoned for the 2017 season as the Malian Football Federation was dissolved, another participant would have been made (along with one from Senegal), the Malian competitions resumed in early May and it reduced to one participant. They could be a participant at the continental but a possibility there could be no participant. No word that the first placed second place of each group qualifies for the 2018 CAF Confederation Cup as no 2017 Cape Verdean Cup will take place.

The Santiago North Premier Division had disputes in the final match of the season ended a week before the start of the nationals, in 2016, it was between Scorpion Vermelho and Varandinha over Scorpion Vermelho's match, the award decision was revoked and Varandinha was regional champions and qualified into the nationals, the first round match was delayed due to that. Benfica Santa Cruz and some other clubs protested AJAC's round 16 win over Juventus Assomada where AJAC fielded a suspended player, Marco Aurélio, who had received two yellow cards. On 7 May, AJAC became champions, the final result actually went to uncertainty especially after 11 May where the regional Judicial Council thought to make it official, Benfica de Santa Cruz were crowned Premier Division champions of the North Zone as well as AJAC. AJAC did not field that suspended player, the chairman Amarildo protested that decision alongside other clubs and on 17 May, the award was revoked and AJAC became regional champions of Santiago North.

In August 2017, Sporting Praia won their recent national championship title after defeating FC Ultramarina from Tarrafal de São Nicolau and Santiago now has 15 titles won, two less than São Vicente.

After two years in which the championship was not held due to the COVID-19 pandemic, the 2022 season culminated with the final played on the island of Boa Vista, in which Académica do Mindelo beat Palmeira 1-0, winning their second title after 33 years.

In a rerun of the previous season's final, the two teams faced each other once again, this time the final was held on the island of Maio, on June 8. After the matched ended 1-1, the winner would eventually be decided via a penalty shootout, with Palmeira beating Académica do Mindelo (7-6), thus becoming national champions for the first time in their history.

== League format ==
The championship is played out in a tournament between the champions of the nine islands (the 10th island, Santa Luzia is not inhabited, Santa Luzia and its islets are part of the São Vicente Premier Division). The islands Santiago and Santo Antão each have two teams due to the fact that both are divided into two football regions (North Santiago, South Santiago, North Santo Antão and South Santo Antão). The defending champions' island or sport region also gets an extra spot in the following season's championship.

=== Clubs 2016-17 ===
==== Group A ====
- Onze Unidos (Cidade do Maio) – Champion of the Maio Premier Division
- FC Ultramarina Tarrafal (Ribeira Brava) – Champion of São Nicolau Island League
- Vulcânicos (São Filipe) – Champion of the Fogo Premier Division
- AJAC da Calheta – Champion of the Santiago North Premier Division.

==== Group B ====
- Académico do Aeroporto (Espargos) – Champion of the Sal Premier Division
- Académica Porto Novo (Porto Novo) – Champion of Santo Antão Island League (South)
- CS Mindelense (Mindelo) – National Champions 2016, also champion of the São Vicente Premier Division
- Paulense DC (Pombas) – Champion of the Santo Antão North Premier Division.

==== Group C ====
- FC Derby (Mindelo) – Runner-up of the São Vicente Premier Division
- Sport Sal Rei (Sal Rei) – Champion of Boa Vista Island League
- Sporting da Brava (Nova Sintra) – Champion of Brava Island League
- Sporting Clube da Praia (Praia) – Champion of the Santiago South Premier Division

== Before independence ==
The competition featured a club from the island of São Vicente and a club from the island of Santiago and continued up to the end of Portuguese rule.

- 1953: Académica (Mindelo) 2-0 Vitória (Praia)
- 1954: CS Mindelense 3-0 CD Travadores
- 1955–59: competition not held
- 1960: CS Mindelense bt CD Travadores (Praia)
- 1961: Sporting Clube da Praia bt GD Amarantes
- 1962: CS Mindelense bt Boavista
- 1963: Boavista 3-0 Académica (Mindelo)
- 1964: Académica (Mindelo) 2-0 Sporting Clube da Praia
- 1965: Académica (Praia) 3-2 FC Derby
- 1966: CS Mindelense 3-1 Sporting Clube da Praia
- 1967: Académica (Mindelo) 2-0 CD Travadores (Praia)
- 1968: CS Mindelense 1-0 Académica (Praia)
- 1969: Sporting Clube da Praia bt Académica do Mindelo
- 1970: competition not held
- 1971: CS Mindelense bt Sporting Clube da Praia
- 1972: CD Travadores (Praia) 2–2 1–0 Académica (Mindelo)
- 1973: Castilho 1–0 Vitória (Praia)
- 1974: CD Travadores 2–1 Castilho

=== Performance by club ===
Club	Winners	Winning years
CS Mindelense	6	1954, 1960, 1962, 1966, 1968, 1971
Académica do Mindelo	3	1953, 1964, 1967
Sporting Clube da Praia	2	1961, 1969
CD Travadores	2	1972, 1974
Castilho	1	1973
Académica da Praia	1	1965
Boavista	1	1963

== Since independence ==
In the first few years. The competition would feature a club from Barlavento and a club from Sotavento. In the 1980s, it would change when a playoff system was introduced. The group system was formed around the mid 1990s.

- 1975 : No competition held
- 1976 : CS Mindelense (Mindelo) 0–0, 3–0 Botafogo São Filipe
- 1977 : CS Mindelense (Mindelo) 2–0, 0–2 (4–3 pen) Sporting Clube da Praia
- 1978 : Competition held but no finals winner as the winner of the Sotavento Islands was undecided to challenge Mindelense, the winner of the Barlavento Islands
- 1979 : No competition held
- 1980 : Botafogo São Filipe 2-1 CS Mindelense (Mindelo)
- 1981 : CS Mindelense (Mindelo) 2–0 Botafogo São Filipe
- 1982 : No competition held due to the 1982 Amílcar Cabral Cup taking place
- 1983 : Académico Sal Rei 2–0 CS Mindelense (Mindelo)
- 1984 : Derby FC (Mindelo) 6–5 on pens Académica (Espargos)
- 1985 : Sporting Clube da Praia 2–0 SC Morabesa
- 1986 : No competition held
- 1987 : Boavista (Praia) 3–1, 0–0 SC Atlético (São Nicolau)
- 1988 : CS Mindelense (Mindelo) 2–0, 0–1 Sporting Clube da Praia
- 1989 : Académica (Mindelo) SC Santa Maria (Sal)
- 1990 : CS Mindelense 2–1, 1–0 Desportivo da Praia
- 1991 : Sporting Clube da Praia 0–0, 1–0 Desportivo Ribeira Brava (São Nicolau)
- 1992 : CS Mindelense (Mindelo) 0–0, 1–1 CD Travadores (Praia)
- 1993 : Académica (Espargos) 2–2, 2–1 Boavista (Praia)
- 1994 : CD Travadores (Praia) 2–0, 2–1 SC Atlético (São Nicolau)
- 1995 : Boavista (Praia)
- 1996 : CD Travadores (Praia)
- 1997 : Sporting Clube da Praia 0–0, 1–1 CS Mindelense (Mindelo)
- 1998 : CS Mindelense (Mindelo)
- 1999 : GD Amarantes (Mindelo) 2–0, 1–1 Vulcânicos (São Filipe)
- 2000 : Derby FC (Mindelo) 1–1, 1–0 Académica Operária (Sal-Rei)
- 2001 : Onze Unidos (Vila de Maio)
- 2002 : Sporting Clube da Praia
- 2003 : Académico do Aeroporto (Espargos) 3–1, 3–2 FC Ultramarina (Tarrafal)
- 2004 : Sal-Rei FC (Sal-Rei) 2–0, 1–2 Académica (Praia)
- 2005 : Derby FC (Mindelo) 1–1, 4–3 Sporting Clube da Praia
- 2006 : Sporting Clube da Praia 1–0, 2–2 Académico do Aeroporto (Espargos)
- 2007 : Sporting Clube da Praia 0–0, 1–1 Académica (Mindelo)
- 2008 : Sporting Clube da Praia 0–1, 3–0 FC Derby (Mindelo)
- 2009 : Sporting Clube da Praia 2–0, 1–1 Académica (Praia)
- 2010 : Boavista (Praia) 2–0, 1–0 Sporting Clube da Praia
- 2011 : CS Mindelense 0–0, 1–0 Sporting Clube da Praia
- 2012 : Sporting Clube da Praia 1–1, 0–0 SC Atlético (Ribeira Brava)
- 2013 : CS Mindelense 3–0, 2–2 Académica Porto Novo
- 2014 : CS Mindelense 2–1, 0–0 Académica Fogo
- 2015 : CS Mindelense 1–1, 1–1 (4–3 on pens) FC Derby (Mindelo)
- 2016 : CS Mindelense 0-1, 1-0 (Mindelense won 5-4 on pens) Académica Porto Novo
- 2017 : Sporting Clube da Praia 2-1, 3-2 FC Ultramarina Tarrafal
- 2018 : Académica da Praia 2-0 CS Mindelense
- 2019 : CS Mindelense 3-1 GD Oásis Atlântico (Santa Maria)
- 2020 : Cancelled (Not held due to Covid-19)
- 2021 : Cancelled (Not held due to Covid-19)
- 2022 : Académica (Mindelo) 1-0 GD Palmeira de Santa Maria
- 2023 : GD Palmeira de Santa Maria 1-1 (Palmeira won 7-6 on pens) Académica (Mindelo)
- 2024 : Boavista (Praia) 1–0, 0–0 FC Derby (Mindelo)
- 2025 : GD Palmeira de Santa Maria 3-4 Sporting Clube da Praia
- 2025 : GD Palmeira de Santa Maria 3-2 CS Mindelense

=== Performance by club ===
Club	Winners	Winning years
CS Mindelense	13	1976, 1977, 1981, 1988, 1990, 1992, 1998, 2011, 2013, 2014, 2015, 2016, 2019
Sporting Clube da Praia	10	1985, 1991, 1997, 2002, 2006, 2007, 2008, 2009, 2012, 2017
Boavista (Praia)	4	1987, 1995, 2010, 2024
Derby FC	3	1984, 2000, 2005
GD Palmeira de Santa Maria	2	2023, 2025
CD Travadores	2	1994, 1996
Académica do Mindelo	2	1989, 2022
Académica da Praia	1	2018
Académica (Espargos)	1	1993
Académico Sal Rei	1	1983
Académico do Aeroporto	1	2003
GD Amarantes (Mindelo)	1	1999
Botafogo São Filipe	1	1980
Onze Unidos	1	2001
Sal-Rei FC	1	2004

=== Performance by island ===
Club	Winners	Winning years
São Vicente	19	1976, 1977, 1981, 1984, 1988, 1989, 1990, 1992, 1998, 1999, 2000, 2005, 2011, 2013, 2014, 2015, 2016, 2019, 2022
Santiago	17	1985, 1987, 1991, 1994, 1995, 1996, 1997, 2000, 2006, 2007, 2008, 2009, 2010, 2012, 2017, 2018, 2024
Sal	4	1993, 2003, 2023, 2025
Boa Vista	1	1983
Fogo	1	1980
Maio	1	1996

== Topscorers ==
The greatest top scorers in the national championships was Zé di Tchecha of Sporting Praia who scored 14 goals. Gerson of SC Atlético scored 13 goals in the 2012 season.

== Seasons in the Cape Verdean Football Championships ==
The number of seasons that each team (in alphabetical order) has played in the National Championships from 1976 until 2018. The teams in Bold participated in 2018 Cape Verdean Football Championships. Not all teams are listed, selected teams are:

Seasons	Clubs
37	**CS Mindelense**
19	Académica Operária
15	Nô Pintcha
14	Académico do Aeroporto do Sal, SC Atlético
13	Académica do Fogo
12	Botafogo FC, FC Derby, Onze Unidos, Ultramarina Tarrafal de São Nicolau
11	Académico 83, **Académica do Porto Novo**, **Sport Sal Rei Club**, **Vulcânicos**
10	**SC Morabeza**
8	SC Santa Maria
7	Paulense, Rosariense Clube
6	Académica do Sal
5	FC Juventude (Sal), **CD Scorpion Vermelho**, Solpontense
4	Académica do Mindelo, Batuque FC, Rosariense Clube, Sporting Clube da Brava
3	Académica da Calheta do Maio, **Barreirense**, Desportivo da Praia, Estrela dos Amadores, Juventude da Furna, **GD Palmeira de Santa Maria**, Sporting Clube do Porto Novo
2	Académica da Brava, Barcelona, **Os Foguetões**, Marítimo do Porto Novo, SC Verdun Pedra de Lume
1	AJAC da Calheta, GD Amarantes, Beira Mar do Maio, Beira-Mar (Ribeira Grande), SC Beira-Mar do Tarrafal, **FC Belo Horizonte**, Benfica de Santa Cruz, GD Corôa, Cutelinho, Desportivo Estância Baixo, Desportivo de Santa Cruz, GDRC Fiorentina, Flor Jovem da Calheta, Grémio Nhágar, Marìtimo, Onze Estrelas, Sanjoanense, CD Sinagoga, Spartak d'Aguadinha, Varandinha

== Broadcasting rights ==
Its matches notably the major clubs are broadcast on RTC's TCV since the introduction of television to Cape Verde. On radio, select and prominent matches are broadcast on RCV. Before independence of 1975, there were broadcast on Rádio Praia aired in Sotavento and Rádio Clube do Mindelo aired in Barlavento.
