= CS Mindelense =

Association football club in Cape Verde

- Full name: Clube Sportivo Mindelense
- Nicknames: Diabos Vermelhos (Red Devils); Leões encarnados (Incarnated Lions)
- Founded: 1919 officially on May 25, 1922
- Ground: Estádio Municipal Aderito Sena; Mindelo, Cape Verde
- Capacity: 5,000
- Chairman: Daniel de Jesus
- Manager: Rui Alberto Leite
- League: Cape Verdean football Championships; São Vicente Island League
- 2016–17: 4th place (national); 1st, champion (regional)
- Website: www.mindelense.com
Home colours	Away colours

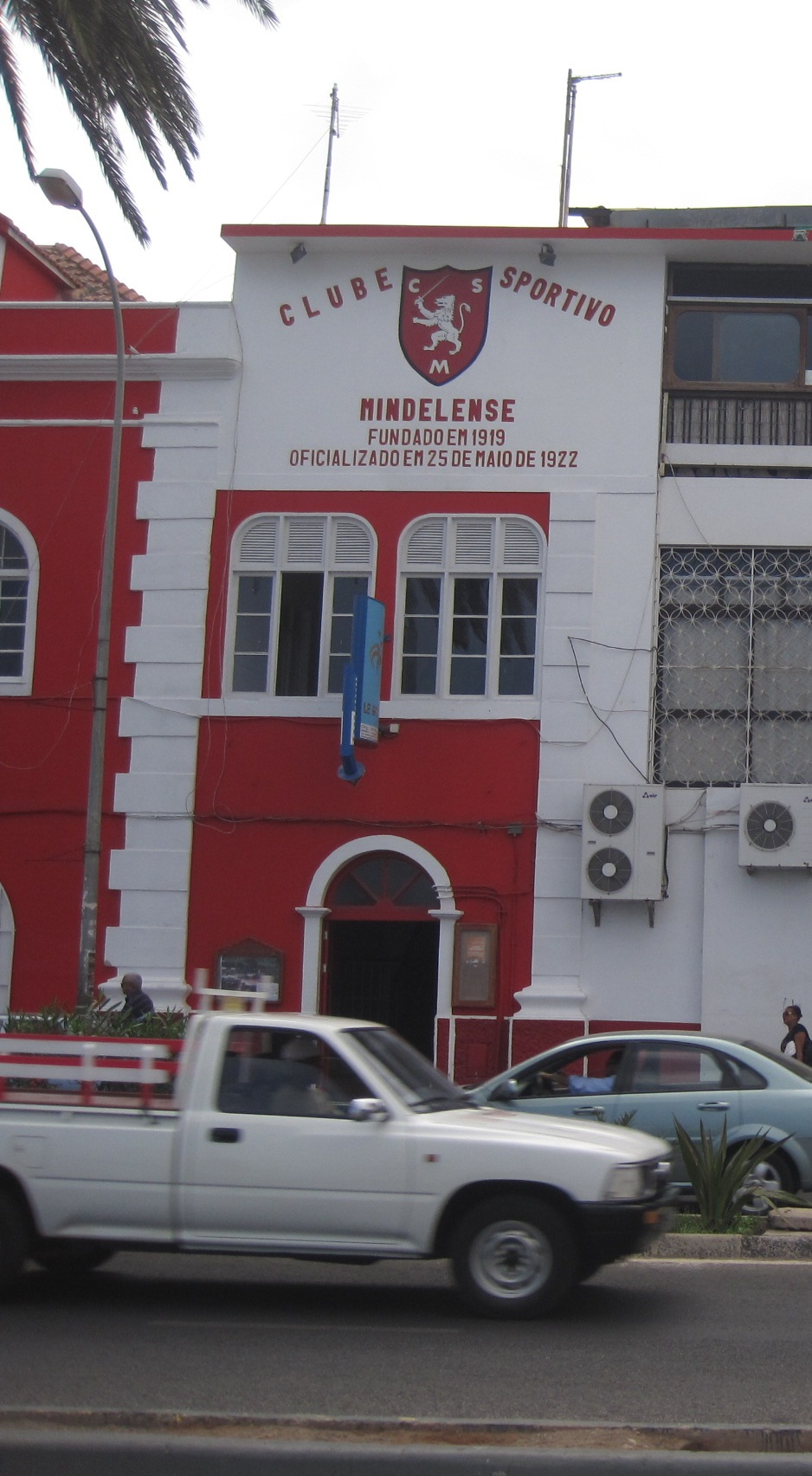
Headquarters of CS Mindelense

Clube Sportivo Mindelense (Capeverdean Crioulo, ALUPEC or ALUPEK: KS Mindelensi (KS – Klubi Sporting), São Vicente Crioulo: KS Mindelense (KS – Klube or Clube (CS))) is a football club that plays in the Premier division of the Interisland League in Cape Verde. It is based in the city of Mindelo in the island of São Vicente. Mindelense is the oldest club in Cape Verde. It is the team won the most cups before and after independence especially in the 1950s and the 1970s with nine titles before independence and eleven after independence. Their first participation in the national division before independence was unofficially in 1938 and officially in 1954, Mindelense first appeared after independence in 1980. Since 30 April 2017, they are one of three unrelegated clubs in the island along with Batuque and Derby. Its current chairman is Daniel de Jesus. The club's nickname is Leões Encarnados or the Incarnated Lions. A nickname that is used less often is the Red Devils or the Diablos Vermelhos.

Overall, Mindelense has 77 honors won and forms one of the highest in the world. Of which Mindelense has 12 national and major titles and 65 regional titles. Mindelense is the top 10 clubs having the most regional titles in the world.

== Logo ==
Its logo color (or colour) is light orange with an orange lion in the middle. The letters C and S representing CS is aligned separately at the top and the M representing Mindelense.

== Uniform ==
Its home uniform is red with white shorts and its visitor uniform is white with red socks. Today, the uniform features white stripes on the shirt's side for home games and its shorts became red. Its clothing are done by Nike and sponsored by Cabo Verde Telecom. In the early 2010s, they were done by Lacatoni and sponsored by JBRN.

Home/First uniform up to 2015
Away/Alternate/Second uniform up to 2015

== History ==
The club was founded in 1919, it would be officialized on May 25, 1922. One of the first greatest players was Adérito Carvalho da Sena who appeared in the 1930s, he would have the stadium named after him. In 1969, Mindelense celebrated its 50th anniversary of the club's foundation. The club was the first in Cape Verde to achieve the professional status in July 1984.

In 2019, CS Mindelense celebrated the 100th year of the club's foundation.

=== National Appearances ===
In 2009, Kadú had the most goals at the national championships with seven, in 2011, Fufura had it with a lower number of five, in 2013, it was Dukinha with 6.

Mindelense appeared for the 2017 season and made their 45+ appearance at the highest level. Mindelense won the first match which was on 14 May defeating Paulense 0–1 in Ponta do Sol.

Mindelense will be present at the 2018 National Division and play in Group A, other participants will be the Académicas of Praia and Porto Novo, the latter from across the island and Boa Vista's Sport Sal Rei Club.

==== Playoff participation ====
Their first time in the playoff participation was in 1954 before independence and 1976 after independence in which won their first eight titles. In their first colonial championships, they defeated Praia's Travadores to get their first title, it was shared with Académica do Mindelo until Mindelense won another title in 1956, from that time, the club possessed the most provincial titles. In 1960, Mindelense won their third after another victory over Travadores, their fourth was in 1962, fifth in 1966, Mindelense got their sixth in 1968 after defeating Académica da Praia in 1968, their 1969 provincial appearance was unsuccessful as they lost to Sporting Praia, a year later as the 1970 edition did not take place, they won their final provincial title and was their last appearance before independence.

Their first national title after independence was in 1976 after defeating Botafogo from Fogo, their second was in 1977 after defeating Sporting Praia. In 1978, Mindelense challenged with Académica Operária from the island of Boa Vista and defeated that club and headed up to the scheduled finals, after Sporting was unawarded in their semis match with Botafogo, the championship finals matches did not take place. Their chance for the fourth one did not claim as Académico Sal Rei beaten CS Mindelense 2–0 in 1983 and was the first Battle of Barlavento, not until 1988 when in both two legs beat Sporting Clube da Praia 2–0 in the first and finally 0–1 in the last., the sixth title was claimed after beating CD Travadores from Praia. The team won the most national titles between 1980 and 2008, Sporting tied it for one year and surpassed Mindelense in 2009 which would last until 2011 when Mindelense tied it once again as they won their eight title defeating Sporting 1–0 in the second finals match, their first match was scoreless. Sporting surpassed Mindelense once more for their third year with the most national titles alone (fourth year with the most national titles) in 2012. It would be broken the following year as Mindelense defeated 3–0 against Académica from Porto Novo in the neighbouring island, the second match was tied at 2 apiece and therefore won their ninth title and once again tied Sporting Praia with the most national titles, Mindelense would win their tenth title a year later beating Académica of the island of Fogo, the club won 2–1 in their first match and scoreless in their second, the 2013–14 CS Mindelense season would become having the nation's most titles with ten titles, again in six years one more than Sporting Praia and their second in a row. The 2014–15 CS Mindelense season would be successful once again and this time challenged Paulense from Paúl, lost one in the first and won two in the second and advanced to the finals and challenged the city's other rival FC Derby by having a single point in each of the two matches, the match went on to penalty kicks and scored 4–3 to claim their third straight national title totalling eleven and two more than Sporting Praia, Mindelense was second and recent in winning consecutive titles in a row numbering three ahead of two (1976–77) by the same club and behind of four by Sporting Praia (2006–09). Mindelense faced Académica from Porto Novo from the neighbouring island northwest, it was the second match ever that was won on penalty kicks and Mindelense defeated Académica Porto Novo the second time and the club won their fourth consecutive national title for the 2016 season, now tied with Sporting Praia with fourth consecutive but a record 12 national titles won, three ahead of Sporting Praia. Also the two final matches were the last at the national championships.

So far Mindelense appeared 13 times at the finals, played 23 finals matches and scored 23 goals at the championship finals.

=== Upper appearances ===
Their first appearance in an African competition was during the 1993 season and challenged ASEC Ndiambour, a club from Senegal and lost 3–2 in all of the two preliminary matches, it was the first appearance of a Cape Verdean club to the continental level. They did not appear in the 2012, 2014, 2015 2016 and lastly the 2017 competitions.

==== Mindelense's appearances in the Portuguese Cup ====
At the time, a colonial or provincial champion competed into the quarterfinal stage of the Portuguese Cup competitions for most of the times from 1961 up to independence in 1975. Mindelense competed in the first cup competition, the Portuguese Cup in 1966 and faced C.S. Marítimo of the Madeira Islands, Mindelense lost both of them, the first 2–4 and the second leg 0–7. Later in their last appearance in the 1971 during the final years of colonial rule, Mindelense challenged against Sporting CP which was played in the island in 1971 and lost 0–21 in their final competition, the worst defeat of the club. Mindelense was the only Cape Verdean club to compete.

=== Regional championships ===
Mindelense has a total of 49 island titles, the most of any club of each regional leagues in the nation. The team were the first club to win a title in the first island championships in 1932, they won five straight titles up to 1936 (then the only in Cape Verde to do so and the only one during Portuguese rule), then four straight up to 1943, after a two-year drought, the club won two consecutive titles in 1947, between 1949 and 1952, Mindelense won four consecutive titles and later seven consecutive between 1954 and 1960, Mindelense won one in 1962 and the next one four years later, Mindelense later won four consecutive titles between 1968 and 1971. Later they won eight island titles in a row (seven after independence) from 1974 until 1982. After winning their 1977 1979 and 1982 titles, Mindelense did not compete in the nationals due to the cancellations of the competition, the latter was due to the 1982 Amílcar Cabral Cup that took place at Estádio Municipal da Praia. In 1980, when they won their sixth straight titles, it was the only club who did that until the following season when Botafogo won six straight, Brava's Nô Pintcha did that in 1998 and Académica do Porto Novo in 2016.

Mindelense would later have six titles in a row from 1988 until 1994, with the 1991 season where no championship was held. Mindelense won three back to back titles between 1996 and 1998, it would also be their last titles won in a row for the next seventeen years. Their next titles would be achieved in 2006, 2009, 2011 and in 2013 since 2015, Mindelense won three consecutive titles.

Other records that Mindelense has at the regional championships had 34 matches without any losses that started from March 29, 2014 with the loss to Derby and lasted up to April 16, 2016 with the loss Amarante, the longest was without any wins at home and numbered 18 which started from January 12, 2014 with the loss to Amarante to April 24, 2016 with the loss to Derby, the shortest was without any wins away (or away-alternative) that lasted from March 29, 2014 to April 16, 2016, this was a regional record.

In 2008, Kadú came to Mindelense from Académica Mindelo to participate in the club for a season, Bock, originally from Sporting Praia also played but a season more. Sténio played for Mindelense in 2010 and a season later played with a Portuguese club Feirense, even Rambé who came from Batuque was in the club. For the 2012 season, the club had Vozinha and Calú. Fredson played in 2014.

An almighty regional success came once more, it first came as the other club Académica Mindelo fielded a fake goalkeeper. One of the five was the April 14 match where the club was awarded 3–0 by the regional association over Académica Mindelo, the original result was 0–1. Mindelense claimed their third consecutive regional title and finished with 32 points, won 9 matches, yet again, not a single loss was made and scored 27 goals. Mindelense returned to the nationals not as title winner but as automatic holders.

Mindelense had the first two matches won in the 2017–18 season, their last win was over Académica Mindelo on December 17 and Mindelense was first. Mindelense is currently second place with 7 points, their first position was grabbed by Batuque, they made a draw with Ribeira Bote on January 6 without any goals scored. Their next match was a goal draw with SC Farense de Fonte Filipe and was third with 8 points, shared with Derby, Mindelense scored four goals at the round, the lowest with their last with five goals at that round last season. Another win was made over Salamansa on January 27 and was still third with 11 points and 5 goals scored alongside Académica Mindelo, the fourth most. Also when Mindelense won, so did Derby and equals the points with the clubs. Mindelense defeated Batuque on February 3 and became second with fewer goals than Derby. It was followed by a two-goal draw with Derby, then Mindelense alongside Derby underwent a three match winning streak defeating Castilho, Académica and Ribeira Bote. At the 9th round, they had 12 goals scored, sharing with Batuque. Mindelense was still second with 14 goals scored, second in the region shared with Castilho. The winning chain with Derby was broken as Mindelense made a goal draw with Farense Fonte Filipe and was second with two points below Derby. Their goal totals were 15, third ahead of Académica and Castilho's 14. Mindelense made another win on March 18, this one over Salamansa and the club had ten goals less than Derby's. The Mindelo Derby was their final match of the season and featured Derby, Mindelense defeated that club 1–2 and became regional champions and conquered their 50th regional title and headed to the national championships on April 7 and be in Group A. Mindelense scored 20 goals, third behind Batuque's and Derby's. Also Mindelense now has its 28 match unbeaten streak at the regionals.

=== Regional cup competitions ===
Their first cup title for Mindelense was claimed in 2007 for the island, their second was in 2014 and later won second in a row in 2015.

In the recent cup matches, Mindelense defeated Falcões do Norte in the 2013 edition, Mindelense did not advance up to the finals in 2014, in 2015, Mindelense claimed their recent cup title in 2015 after defeating Amarante, in the 2016 edition, Mindelense lost to Salamansa FC, a club based 7 km northeast of Mindelo. Mindelense came back for the last time to another cup final, in May 2017 and featured Derby, another loss was made and lost the title to that club. Late in the 2017–18 season, Mindelense participated in the semis and faced Batuque, the match went undecided as it ended in a goal draw, after extra time, Mindelense lost the penalty shootout 4–5 and out from appearing in the finals.

=== Regional super cups ===
Mindelense also has four Super Cup titles were achieved in 2006, 2009, 2015 and 2016.

Their first Super Cup title was won in 2006 after beating Batuque FC making it the second club to win a title. Mindelense competed in the 2009 edition and defeated Derby, second place in the regional cup by awarding the club 3–0 as Derby forfeited the match. As Mindelense were champions and cup winner, Mindelense first faced Falcões do Norte of Chã de Alecrim in late 2013 and lost to that club, their next was on November 7, 2015, Mindelense faced the second placed cup team Amarante in the 2015 São Vicente Super Cup and claimed their third title. Between January 13 and November 7, 2015, Mindelense shared their most possessed super cup titles together with Batuque. Mindelense headed to the 2016 São Vicente Cup final and faced Salamansa, a club based on the north of the island, Mindelense lost to Salamansa 0–3. As island or regional championship, Mindelense again challenged Salamansa and defeated that club in the regional Super Cup match on October 8 and claimed their second consecutive super cup. Mindelense, again qualified as champion made their sixth super cup appearance on October 16, 2017, the match was the only second meeting with the clubs at the regional super cup, the club attempted their third straight title, that had failed as they lost to FC Derby 2–1.

=== Opening Tournament and Association Cup titles ===
Their first opening tournament title was achieved in 2000, their second was in 2003, their third in 2005 and later won two in a row in 2006, they would win the next two in 2008 and 2009, another was won in 2013 and their most recent was in 2017.

=== Multi-tier Champions' Cup ===
Mindelense, winner of the Premier Division faced Ribeira Bote, winner of the Second Division on October 15, 2016 in the first ever Champion's Cup (of the Divisional Champion's Cup avoiding confusion with the Boavista Champion's Cup) featuring the winners of each of the two divisions. Mindelense won their first title. CS Mindelense will become the only club to appear twice, Mindelense will challenge the Second Division champion GS Castilho later in 2017, the second São Vicente Champion's Cup.

=== Other ===
In 2016, Mindelense also appeared as champion in the next Mindelo Cup in years, a friendly competition, it featured the regional cup winner Salamansa, two guest teams outside the island, one was Académica do Porto Novo and the other was Paulense, both from Santo Antão.

=== Friendly competitions ===
In 2016, the club appeared at the Boavista's Champion's Cup in Praia on October 28, the club lost in the semis and played a 3rd place match on October 29 against Académica do Fogo.

== Head offices ==
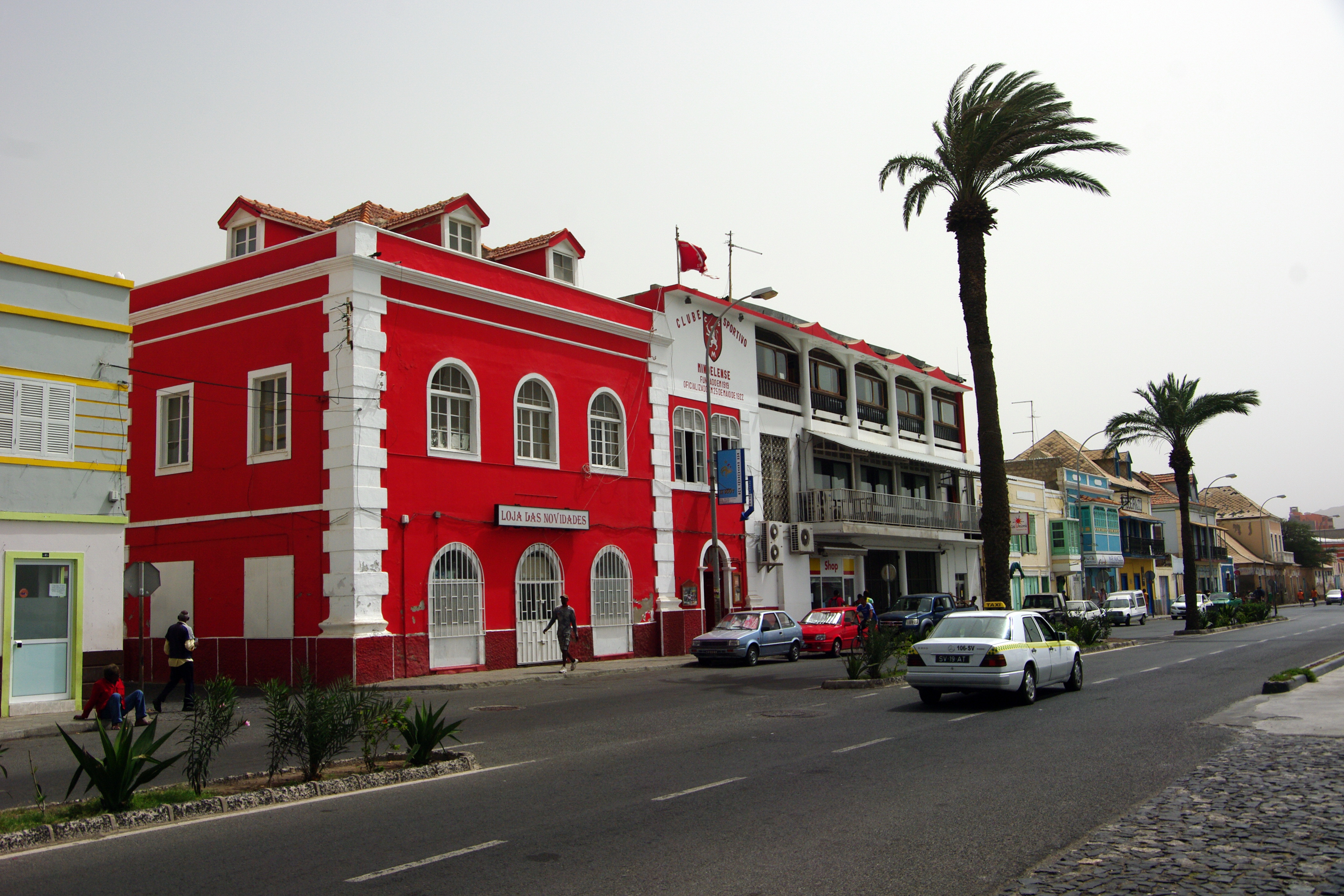
Head offices of CS Mindelense located at Avenida Marginal (or Avenida da Praia in that part)

The club's head office is on Avenida Marginal, that section is also known as Rua or Avenida da Praia in the center of the city. the building being located featured colonial neo-classical architecture. Nearby buildings is the former Cory Brothers building, Other points of interests are Mindelo's marina and yacht, the statue of Diogo Afonso, the replica of Lisbon's Torre de Belém, the Fish Market and Praça Estrela

== Stadium ==
The club and plays in the Adérito Sena Stadium with a capacity of once served up to 4,000, now serves 5,000 after the renovation, it is named after one of the first players of the club Adérito Carvalho da Sena (1905–1970). FC Derby, Académica do Mindelo, Amarante and Batuque are the other major clubs of the island playing in that stadium. Mindelense also trains at the stadium and partly at Adilson Nascimento Field.

== Rivalry ==
Mindelense's main rivalry is FC Derby (see Mindelense–Derby rivalry), known as the Mindelo Derby (Clássico Mindelense), other rivalries are Académica do Mindelo (see Mindelense–Académica rivalry) and Batuque FC (see Mindelense–Batuque rivalry), the only three in São Vicente, its interisland rivalry is with Sporting Praia.

== Honours ==
=== National (Cape Verde Islands) ===
- Top-tier championships: 19
  - Cape Verdean Championship: 13

1976, 1977, 1981, 1988, 1990, 1992, 1998, 2011, 2013, 2014, 2015, 2016, 2019

  - Before Independence (Colonial Championships): 6

1954, 1960, 1962, 1966, 1968, 1971

- Cape Verdean Cup: 2

1982, 2024

- Cape Verdean Super Cup: 1

2014

=== Regional (São Vicente Island) ===
- São Vicente Premier Division: 50

1932, 1933, 1934, 1935, 1936, 1940, 1941, 1942, 1943, 1946, 1947, 1949, 1950, 1951, 1952, 1954, 1955, 1956, 1957, 1958, 1959, 1960, 1962, 1966, 1968, 1969, 1970, 1971, 1974–75, 1975–76, 1976–77, 1977–78, 1978–79, 1979–80, 1980–81, 1981–82, 1987–88/1988–89, 1989–90, 1991–92, 1992–93, 1993–94, 1995–96, 1996–97, 1997–98, 2005–06, 2008–09, 2010–11, 2012–13, 2014–15, 2015–16, 2016–17, 2017–18

- São Vicente Opening Tournament: 8

1999–00, 2002–03, 2004–05, 2005–06, 2007–08, 2008–09, 2012–13, 2017

- São Vicente Cup: 3

2007–08, 2012–13, 2014–15

- São Vicente SuperCup: 4

2005–06, 2008–09, 2014–15, 2015–16

- São Vicente Divisional (Multi-tier) Champion's Cup: 1

2016

== League and cup history ==
=== Performance in African competitions ===
Mindelense's results in CAF competition
Season	Competition	Qualification method	Round	Opposition	Home	Away	Aggregate
1993	African Cup of Champions Clubs	Cape Verdean national champions	Preliminary Round	(Senegal) ASEC Ndiambour	1–1	2–1	2–3

=== Colonial era ===
Year	Finals	Club	Result
1960	Winner	CD Travadores	Champion
1966	Winner	CD Travadores	Champion
1968	0–1	Académica da Praia	Champion
1969	Lost	Sporting Clube da Praia	Finalist
1971	Winner		Champion

==== The club in the Portuguese football structure ====
- Portuguese Cup: 2 appearances

1966 – Third round: vs. C.S. Marítimo (2–4, 0–7)
1971 – 1/8 final: Mindelense (0–21 vs Sporting CP)

=== National championship ===
Year	Stage	Opposition	Result
1976	Semi-finals	Juventude	Won
1976	Finals	Botafogo	Champion
1977	Semi-finals	Club from Sal	Won
1977	Finals	Botafogo	Champion

Season	Div.	Pos.	Pl.	W	D	L	GS	GA	GD	P	Notes	Playoffs
2006	1B	4	5	2	0	3	6	7	-1	6	Did not advance	Did not participate
2009	1A	2	5	4	0	1	13	4	+9	12		4th (no points)
2011	1A	1	5	4	1	0	13	1	+12	13		Champion
2012	1B	3	5	2	1	2	10	4	+6	7	Did not advance	Did not participate
2013	1A	2	5	3	1	1	9	4	+5	6		Champion
2014	1B	1	5	4	0	1	9	2	+7	12		Champion
2015	1B	1	5	5	0	0	14	1	+13	15		Champion
2016	1B	1	5	3	2	0	11	3	+8	11		Champion
2017	1B	1	6	4	1	1	8	3	+5	13		DQ at the semis
2017	1B	1	6	4	1	1	8	3	+5	13		DQ at the semis
2018	1A	2-Q	6	2	4	0	6	4	+2	10	Advanced into the playoffs	Finalist

=== Island/Regional Championship ===
Season	Div.	Pos.	Pl.	W	D	L	GS	GA	GD	P	Cup	Notes
2005–06	2	1	14	-	-	-	-	-	-	-		Promoted into the National Championships
2008–09	2	1	14	-	-	-	-	-	-	-		Promoted into the National Championships
2010–11	2	1	14	-	-	-	-	-	-	-		Promoted into the National Championships
2011–12	2	1	14	-	-	-	-	-	-	-		Also promoted into the National Championships
2012–13	2	1	14	-	-	-	-	-	-	-	Winner	Promoted into the National Championships
2013–14	2	2	14	10	1	3	37	14	+23	31		Also promoted into the National Championships
2014–15	2	1	14	12	2	0	36	7	+29	38	Winner	Promoted into the National Championships
2015–16	2	1	14	9	3	2	24	7	+17	30	Finalist	Promoted into the National Championships
2016–17	2	1	14	9	5	0	27	9	+18	32	Finalist	Promoted into the National Championships
2017–18	2	1	14	10	4	0	20	6	+14	34	Semi-finalist	Promoted into the National Championships

=== Association cup ===
Season	Reg. Div.	Pos.	Pl.	W	D	L	GS	GA	GD	P
2008–09	1	1	-	-	-	-	-	-	-	-
2016–17	1	3	7	4	3	0	10	5	+5	15
2017	1	1	7	6	1	0	13	2	+11	19

== Statistics ==
- Best position: Preliminary Round (continental)
- Best position at a cup competition: 1st (national)
- Best position at an association cup: 1st (regional)
- Appearances at the championships:
  - National: 37
  - Regional: 80
- Appearance at the multi-tier Championship event: Once, in 2016
- Appearances at a regional Super Cup competition: 5
- Appearances at an association cup competition: 16
- Appearances before independence:
  - Appearances at the Portuguese Cup: 2 (1966 and 1971)
  - Total goals scored at the Portuguese Cup: 4
  - Total losses at the Portuguese Cup: 3
- Total matches played at the continental championships: 2
- Total goals scored at the continental championships: 2
- Highest number of goals in a season, National level: 14 (regular season), 18 (total)
- Highest number of points in a season: 15 (national)
- Most games without a loss at the Regional Championships: 34 (March 29, 2014 – April 16-2016)
- Most games without a loss at home at the Regional Championships: 18 (January 12, 2014 – April 24, 2016)
- Most games without a loss away at the Regional Championships: 13 (March 29, 2014 – April 16, 2016)
- Worst defeat: Mindelense 0–21 Sporting CP, 1/8 final in 1971

== Players ==
=== Current squad ===
2 February 2017

Note: Flags indicate national team as defined under FIFA eligibility rules; some limited exceptions apply. Players may hold more than one non-FIFA nationality.

No.	Pos.	Nation	Player
1	GK	CPV	Piduca
2	MF	CPV	Zazú
3	DF	CPV	Hidelvis
4	DF	CPV	Buday
5	DF	CPV	Fache
6	MF	CPV	Dário
7	MF	CPV	Yvan
8	MF	CPV	Maniche
9	FW	CPV	Djonny
10	FW	CPV	Papalelé
12	GK	CPV	Hélio

No.	Pos.	Nation	Player
13	DF	CPV	Cleison
14	DF	CPV	Toi Adão
15	MF	CPV	Djim Kelly
18	MF	CPV	Ivan
19	FW	CPV	Sílvio
20	FW	CPV	Ericson
21	DF	CPV	Day
22	DF	CPV	Vinha
27	FW	CPV	Nené
88	MF	CPV	Yuran

== Chairmen ==
- Augusto Vasconcelo Lopes (in 2012)
- (Cape Verde) Adilson Nascimento (2013 – September 4, 2015)
- (Cape Verde) Daniel de Jesus (since September 4, 2015)

== Managers ==
- (Cape Verde) Tchida (1970s and the 1980s and in the 2000s)
- Cadino da Luz (1980s), as assistant manager
- (Cape Verde) Almara (1990s and 2000s and in 2012)
- (Guinea-Bissau) Alberto Gomes (1990s)
- (Cape Verde) Baessa (1990s)
- (Cape Verde) Daniel Vieira (Abel II) (in 2010)
- (Cape Verde) Bubista (2013)
- (Cape Verde) Rui Alberto Leite (present)
