= FC Derby =

- Full name: Futebol Clube de Derby
- Nickname: Dragões (Dragons)
- Founded: August 5, 1929
- Ground: Estádio Municipal Adérito Sena
- Capacity: 5,000
- Chairman: Carlos Alberto Lopes
- Manager: Yoya
- League: São Vicente Island League; Cape Verdean Football Championships
- 2015–16 2016: 2nd place Semi-finalist
Home colours	Away colours

Futebol Clube Derby (short form: FC Derby, second name: Derby São Vicente) is a football club that had played in the Premier division and the São Vicente Island League in Cape Verde. They are Cape Verde's only affiliate of FC Porto and the oldest affiliate in the whole of Africa. It is based in the city of Mindelo on the island of São Vicente. It is the second team of the regional league who won the most titles after independence especially in the 1960s and the 1970s. Its current president is Carlos Alberto Lopes and its coach is Yoya who became in May 2017. The club name is the Dragons or Dragões, the same as Porto's slogan. Since 30 April 2017, they are one of three unrelegated clubs in the island along with Batuque and Mindelense.

Derby is one of the most successful football (soccer) club in Cape Verde, having won about 22 official titles, 3 are national titles and 19 are regional titles.

== History ==
The club was founded on August 5, 1929 and is the third oldest club on the island. It was founded by the British. The clube became an affiliate to the Portuguese club FC Porto in the new century and is the 65th affiliate, the logo is similar to Porto's, being the old logo and is not the same as Porto's current logo. In 1939, the club celebrated its 10th anniversary, its 25th anniversary in 1953 and its 50th anniversary in 1979.

=== Regional competition ===
Derby participated in the first regional championships in 1938 the club lost to CS Mindelense, they also lost in 1939.

FC Derby won their first title in 1965 and became the region's fourth club after Académica to do so, Derby had the fewest titles until the club won four island (or regional) titles in a row between 1983 and 1986. After winning the 1986 title, they did not participate in the national championships as they were not held. Later they had two in a row titles in 2000 and 2001, their next titles would be achieved in 2001, 2005, 2008 and their most recent in 2014. Derby is second in the number of regional titles numbering ten together with Académica Mindelo since 2014. Between 1985 and 2014, Derby was third in the total number of titles won, in the middle of the season, they lost a chance for a regional title.

In 2014, Almara became coach for nearly three years, he previously coached Fogo's Desportivo de Cova Figueira and Mindelense. In the 2016–17 season, originally that Derby was third placed. In April, Derby made a protest that the club was using a goalkeeper with a fake identity. On April 24, the Disciplinary Council of the Cape Verdean Football Federation, removed every points that the fake goalkeeper had played totalling 11 and included one with Salamansa, Derby, Farense, the almighty Mindelense and Ribeira Bote, from February 25, they were the first three matches and the last two matches on April 15, one of five matches were on February 25 where Derby was awarded 0–3, the original result was a scoreless draw. Derby's position risen to second and achieved the qualification zone for the 2017 national championships as Mindelense were national champions last season. Derby officially finished runner up in the regionals with 21 points, a difference with Académica Mindelo, won 6 matches, 4 draws and scored 22 goals.

Derby started off the 2017–18 season with a win over Farense. Up next were two straight draws. Derby was fifth place, nonetheless, they had the region's second most goals with a total of five behind Castilho's. Derby had a huge 5–1 win over Castilho on January 14 and became the region's highest result for the season, they scored 10 goals in total which became the region's first at the fourth round and their position rose to second as they had 8 points. Derby São Vicente made another win over Ribeira Bote on January 28 and remained second, they scored 13 goals, the most in the region. Derby made a two goal with their rival Mindelense. Then both Derby and Mindelense underwent a three match winning streak and had 15 points each. For Derby, they defeated Farense, Batuque and Salamansa and Derby was first with 22 goals scored, eight more than Mindelense. Mindelense shared other results including 24 points, seven wins and three draws. Derby made straight win number four, an 0–3 win over Castilho and also broke the win chain with Mindelense, they have 27 points, two more, Derby remains first and also scored 25 goals and is goal leader in the Premier Division. Derby made another straight win number five, over Ribeira Bote and continues to have 10 goals more than Mindelense. Also what is coming up, a possible championship title and a national participation.

=== National competition ===
Derby entered in 2005 to the national championships, in the second match, Derby defeated 10–3 over Académica do Porto Novo, a club from Santo Antão just northwest of the island making it the second highest scoring match of the season and the club's highest score to date in the national level, overall Derby scored 23 goals which is the club's highest, In 2006, the Santiago North Zone did not participate in the premier division as they did not win the championship, which meant that FC Derby automatically advanced into the premier league by virtue of having been champions in 2005. After winning a regional cup in 2007, Derby was the islands first team to qualify into the first ever Cape Verdean Cup, there, Derby lost. In 2008, after winning another regional title, Derby entered the 2008 Cape Verdean Football Championships and was placed in Group B and became the first club to win all five matches in a six club group stage and received 15 points, the club's record. In the 2015 edition, Derby of Group B done this for the second time winning all five matches in a six club group stage and received 15 points, this was done together with Mindelense but Derby conceded two goals, this was the most recent.

Overall, Derby competed 12 times in the national level. Since the introduction of the points system in the early 1990s, Derby has a total of 82 points won at the National Championships. Their 12th appearance was made at the 2017 championships, they compete for the first time in three groups and placed in Group C alongside the two Sporting clubs (Brava and Praia (of Santiago South) and Boa Vista's Sport Sal Rei Club. Their first national match was a loss to Sporting Praia 0–1 at home on May 13, an unexpected loss was made to a less prominent club Sporting Brava at the following round. Derby made their recent only win a week later as they defeated Boa Vista's Sport Sal Rei Club 1–0.

==== Full stories of the team's playoff victories and advances ====
Derby's first appearance into the Cape Verdean finals was in 1965 and lost 3–2 to Académica da Praia, their only appearance under Portuguese rule.

FC Derby entered the playoffs for the first time after independence in 1984 and won 3–2 over Académica (Espargos). Derby FC entered the playoffs in 2000 and challenged Académica Operária, a team from Sal Rei, the first match was tied at 1 apiece, and in the second defeated Académica Operária 1–0 and claimed the 2000 championship, their totals was third in the nation, shared with Praia's strongest clubs of Boavista and Travadores. The 2005 championship finals with Sporting Clube da Praia was a 1–1 tie in the first match and a 4–3 victory in the second, giving Cape Verde their third title, no qualification to the 2006 CAF Champions League would occur for Derby, also their title totals became third, ahead of Boavista and Travadores, from mid 2010, the totals are now shared with Boavista Praia. In the 2008 edition, Derby advanced up to the finals and lost the competition to Sporting Praia, their next appearance in the finals was seven years later. The club would enter the 2015 Championships as second place of the regional league, already Mindelense who were first place of the regional league entered into the national championships as they won the 2014 national title. Derby advanced into the finals where they challenged against the city's rival Mindelense and scored 1 in each two matches, they would lose 4–3 on penalty kicks to Mindelense and earned second place. The finals were also the club's last before the two phase system at the nationals was announced in 2016.

So far Derby appeared five times at the finals, played 9 matches at the championship finals.

=== Continental appearance ===
Their first and only appearance into the CAF Champions League was in 2001 and lost to Real Banjul in the preliminaries 1–0 in two matches. As second place in the 2015 national season, due to uncertain reasons particularly financial, Derby did not appear in the 2016 CAF Confederation Cup.

=== Other regional competitions ===
Other competitions included the regional cup, their titles won in 2004, 2005 and 2007. In 2004, Derby was one of three club who had their only cup title, the others were Ribeira Bote and Batuque. In 2005, Derby possessed the most cup titles in the region for a season, in 2006, it was shared with Batuque and had the most again from 2007 to 2009. Derby lost it in 2010 and became second to Batuque in 2010, from 2015 to 2017, the second most total was shared with Mindelense.

Derby came up to the regional cup finals in the 2016–17 season, their next in three years and challenged CS Mindelense, Derby defeated the club and claimed their recent cup title, their next in a decade and became the second club with the most cup titles, behind Batuque FC and ahead of CS Mindelense. Recently in the regional cup semis, Derby defeated Falcões 0–1 on March 1 and will head to the finals to face Batuque on April 7, another challenge with each other in four years.

Derby won their first super cup title won in 2005 after defeating Ribeira Bote in two legs. Qualified as regional champion, Derby made their first attempt for a second super cup title for 2007, it failed as they lost it to Académica do Mindelo. In 2008, Derby's title total became second and last alongside Académica Mindelo and from 2010 Batuque. Qualified as cup winner, they came back in 2009 for another attempt which was failed as the squad did not appear in that super cup competition. In 2010, Batuque's single title total became shared with Derby's and Académica Mindelo's for two years, Derby's total became third and last, shared with Académica and from 2013 Falcões do Norte. As the club they qualified as regional champions, they came back for their third attempt for a second super cup title, the 2014 edition played on January 13, 2015 and that also failed as they lost the title to Batuque. Qualified as cup winner, Derby made their fourth attempt for a super cup title which was also their next regional super cup appearance in three years on October 15, 2017, the club defeated Mindelense 2–1 and ended their twelve-year wait for their second Super Cup title for São Vicente which they achieved. Derby is the only one being third in totals, ahead of Académica's and Falcões do Norte's single title.

Derby started off the 2018 regional cup season with an 0–4 win over Corinthians on January 22 and headed directly to the semis and defeated Falcões do Norte on March 7 and headed to the regional final on April 7 and faced Batuque, the regulation ended without any goals scored and later lost 4–3 in the penalty shoot and with it the title to Batuque, also lost their qualification into the super cup.

==== Association Cup ====
Also Derby has titles in the association cup (up to 2007 as opening tournament) in 2001 whose club was the second to possess, later in 2011 and in 2012. Derby was runner up in some editions, in the 2006–07 edition behind Académica do Mindelo, in the 2016–17 Association Cupbehind Batuque and recently behind the island's and Barlavento's strongest club Mindelense.

In 2002, Derby's single title was later shared with Académica Mindelo's, Falcões do Norte from 2005 and lastly Batuque from 2008. From 2002 to 2007, it was second and last, from 2007, it was third and last behind Académica do Mindelo's until 2011 when it became shared with that club and was again second, since 2012, Derby is solely second in the most number of association cup titles behind Mindelense and ahead of both Académica Mindelo's and Batuque's.

== Logo ==
Its logo colors are black, white and blue, the F.C. Derby is at the top, its dragon carrying the shield and the football colored in blue. In the dragon part features a ribbon reading "Mindelo Cidade" and "Morabeza" on right. The Dragon is also the club's nickname. The top part of the shield reads F.C.D. and has a blue-white striped shield in it.

== Uniform ==
Home uniform up to 2014
Away uniform to 2014
Home uniform from September 2014 to November 2016
Away uniform from September 2014 to 2016
Home uniform up from November 2016 to May 2017

Its uniform color represents for its home games a blue and vertical T-shirt, and blue shorts and white socks for home games and a white T-shirt with the remainder blue for away and alternate games.

Its former uniform colors was blue with a single white stripe, white sleeves and socks and blue shorts for home games and white clothing with blue sleeves and socks for visitor's games, both used until 2014. Between September 2014 and October 2016, its colors were striped blue and a white T-shirt with blue pants and white socks. Its visitor's color was black with a white left sash, black socks and white shorts. From October 2016 to May 2017, its home uniform were a blue and vertical T-shirt with blue sleeves, blue shorts and socks.

== Stadium ==
The club and plays in the Estádio Municipal Adérito Sena with a capacity of once served up to 4,000, now serves 5,000 after the renovation, it is named after one of the first players of the club Adérito Carvalho da Sena (1905–1970). Mindelense, Académica do Mindelo, Amarante and Batuque are the other major clubs of the island playing in that stadium. Derby also trains at the stadium and partly at Adilson Nascimento Field.

== Rivalry ==
Derby's only main rivalry is CS Mindelense. (see Mindelense–Derby rivalry). In 2015, the rivalry was the only time it taken to a national level.

== Honours ==
- Cape Verdean Championship: 3

1983–84, 1999–2000, 2004–05

- São Vicente Premier Division: 10

1965, 1982–83, 1983–84, 1984–85, 1985–86, 1999–2000, 2000–01, 2004–05, 2007–08, 2013–14

- São Vicente Opening Tournament: 3

2000–01, 2010–11, 2011–12

- São Vicente Cup: 4

2003–04, 2004–05, 2006–07, 2016–17

- São Vicente SuperCup: 2

2004–05, 2016–17

== League and cup history ==
=== Performance in African competitions ===
Derby's results in CAF competition
Season	Competition	Qualification method	Round	Opposition	Home	Away	Aggregate
2001	CAF Champions League	Cape Verdean national champions	Preliminary Round	(The Gambia) Real Banjul	0–0	1–0	0–1

=== Colonial/Provincial era ===
Year	Finals	Club	Result
1965	3–2	Académica da Praia	Finalist

=== National championship ===
Season	Div.	Pos.	Pl.	W	D	L	GS	GA	GD	P	Cup	Notes	Playoffs
2000	1B	1	2	1	1	0	1	0	+1	4		Advanced into the finals	Champion
2001	1	5	6	2	2	2	6	7	-1	8			
2005	1B	2	5	4	1	0	23	3	+20	13			Champion
2006	1A	1	4	3	1	0	13	2	+11	10			4th place
2008	1B	1	5	5	0	0	14	3	+11	15			Semi-finalist
2014	1A	5	5	4	1	3	4	6	-2	4		Did not advance	Did not participate
2015	1A	1	5	5	0	0	12	2	+1	15		Advanced into the finals	Finalist
2016	1A	1	5	4	1	0	8	2	+6	13		Advanced into the finals	Semi-finalist
2017	1C	2-U	6	3	1	2	7	5	+2	7		Did not advance	Did not participate
Total:			43	31	8	7	88	30	+58	89			
Total with playoffs:			61	39	13	12	114	49	+65				

2-U: A club who finished second and in the second place ranking (best of three), ranked as a non-participant in the playoff stage which the club has been eliminated from as they finished in one of the last two positions

=== Island/Regional Championships ===
Season	Div.	Pos.	Pl.	W	D	L	GS	GA	GD	P	Cup	Notes
2004–05	2	1	-	-	-	-	-	-	-	-	Winner	Promoted into the National Championships
2007–08	2	1	-	-	-	-	-	-	-	-		Promoted into the National Championships
2013–14	2	1	14	9	5	0	27	9	+18	32		Promoted into the National Championships
2014–15	2	2	14	6	4	4	19	15	+4	22		Also promoted into the National Championships
2015–16	2	2	14	7	6	1	26	11	+15	27		Also promoted into the National Championships
2016–17	2	2	14	6	4	4	22	18	+4	22	Winner	Also promoted into the National Championships
2017–18	2	2	14	10	3	1	29	10	+19	33	Finalist	

=== Association cup ===
Season	Reg. Div.	Pos.	Pl.	W	D	L	GS	GA	GD	P
2016–17	1	2	7	5	1	1	16	5	+11	16
2017	1	2	7	6	1	0	18	9	+9	19

== Statistics ==
- Best position: Preliminary round (continental)
- Best position at the cup competitions: Group Stage (national)
- Best position at an Association Cup: 1st
- Appearances at a championship competition:
  - Regional: 79, to be 80
  - Total top tier appearances: 14
    - Colonial era: 1
    - Since independence: 13
- Appearances in a cup competition:
  - National: 1
  - Regional: 17
- Appearances at a regional Super Cup competition: 5
- Appearances at an association cup competition: 16
- Highest number of wins in a season, national level: 6 (overall), in 2005 and in 2015
- Highest number of goals in a season, national level: 23 (regular season), 32 (with playoffs), in 2005
- Highest number of points in a season: 15 (national)
- Total number of points: 89 (national)
- Highest scoring match at the National Championships: Derby 10–1 Académica Porto Novo, May 21, 2005
- Lowest number of goals scored in a season: 3 (national), in 2000

== Current squad ==
2014–15 season, partial listing

- Bena
- Duque (the Duke)
- Kévy
- Quatro (the Fourth)

== Chairmen ==
- Augusto Vasconcelos Lopes (in 2012)
- (Cape Verde) Carlos Alberto Lopes (present)

== Managers ==
Name	Nationality	From	To
Alberto Gomes	Cape Verde		
Ika (Antônio Dias)	Cape Verde		
Tchida	Cape Verde	in 2012	c. 2014
Almara	Cape Verde	c. 2014	May 2017
Yoya	Cape Verde	since May 2017	
