= São Vicente Premier Division =

- Founded: c. 1930
- Region: São Vicente Island, Cape Verde
- Number of clubs: 8 (Premier Division); 6 (Second Division)
- Promotion to: Cape Verdean Football Championship
- Relegation to: São Vicente Second Division
- Current champions: CS Mindelense (52nd time) (2016–17)
- Most championships: CS Mindelense (52 times)
- Broadcaster(s): TCV (major clubs)
- Website: fcf.cv/sao-vicente

The São Vicente Island or Regional Premier Division is a regional championship played in São Vicente Island, Cape Verde. The championship is organized by the São Vicente Regional Football Association (Associação Regional de São Vicente de Futebol, ARSVF). The winner of the championship plays in Cape Verdean football Championships of each season. In 1989, 2012, 2015, 2016 and 2017, a second place club participated in the national championships, Académica do Mindelo in 1989, Mindelense in 2014 and FC Derby in 2015 and in 2016 and will be for 2017. The 7th place club plays with a Second Division runner-up in a division decisional match to decide on promoting or remain in the Second Division. The last placed club relegated into the São Vicente Second Division. Up to around 2010, only a club was relegated into that division.

== About the Island/Regional League ==
The area includes the northwest central part of Cape Verde (especially the three islands of Santa Luzia, Ilhéu Branco and Ilhéu Raso which are not populated today are included in area, though the name of other isles are not used, also there are no clubs in that area).

== History ==
The island league was founded in 1938 and is the oldest and existing island league in Cape Verde. In the founding years, the league formerly included much of the Barlavento Islands, when more clubs were created even the other islands, it reduced the area to only the northwestern and then the northwestcentral part of the country. None of the clubs outside the island participated in the island division before their island divisions were created. In its first three seasons, it had four clubs and were Amarantes, Castilho, Derby and Mindelense, Académica was founded later and the number of clubs risen to five.

The two island competitions were the highest level local championship in Cape Verde. The island had the second largest championships in the country in 1953 which lasted to the late 2000s. The 1953 island champion who was Académica would compete in the first colonial championship and claimed the first colonial title. The only entrant was a club from the island of São Vicente up to the end of colonial rule. Some clubs were created years later including Castilho and Falcões do Norte in the 1960s and increased its clubs to six, the points system was introduced and featured a ten-match season that started in the early of the year. After Batuque was founded, the club number rise to eight and nine in around 1990 after Corinthians who was the first Brazilian based club on the island was founded in 1988, it started a sixteen match season and had a two-year season.

After the Second Division was established in 2008, in mid-2008, GS Castilho became the first club to be relegated into the Second Division.

Recently of club participations in the Premier Division, since May 8, 2016, only four are unrelegated and are Mindelense, Batuque, Derby and Falcões do Norte.

Between the late 2000s and 2015, the Championship had the third largest number of clubs, currently the League has the fourth most number of clubs in the country.

=== Title history ===
Mindelense won their first of the consecutive titles in the beginning of the league. Amarantes won their first in 1944 and their second in 1945 before Mindelense won two more in 1946 and 1947. Académica of Mindelo won their first in 1948, Mindelense would go on to win four consecutive titles after that. Académica broke Mindelense's fifth straight title change and won their second in 1953, Mindelense went to win seven consecutive titles, Amarantes broke Mindelense's eight straight title and claimed their third in 1961, Mindelense won again in 1962, Académica won two straight followed by FC Derby who won their very first title in 1965. Mindelense won another in 1966, Académica won another in 1967, Mindelense won eight consecutive titles between 1975 and 1982, one was in the final year of Portuguese colonial rule, the other seven was won after the nation became independent. Derby won four consecutive between 1983 and 1986, Mindelense won 6 consecutive between 1988 and 1994, though the 1990/91 season was cancelled. Académica broke Mindelense's change on having 7 consecutive for the second time in 1995. Mindelense continued to be island champions between 1996 and 1998, Amarante was the next winner in 1999, two consecutive champions was won by Derby and later by Batuque in 2002, the recent club to win their first title, Mindelense won titles every two years between 2009 and 2015 and recently won third second consecutive in 2017 and is the recent champion of the island.

CS Mindelense has the most number of island titles with 49 and the most of any of the island leagues in the country. Mindelense's percentage dominates around 62% of the regional total of 79. The second are Académica and Derby with 10 and the fewest with two titles is Castilho. Six clubs in the championships won titles.

=== Records and successes ===
CS Mindelense has 34 matches without any losses that started from March 29, 2014 with the loss to Derby and lasted up to April 16, 2016 with the loss Amarante, the longest was without any wins at home and numbered 18 which started from January 12, 2014 with the loss to Amarante to April 24, 2016 with the loss to Derby, the shortest was without any wins away (or away-alternative) that lasted from March 29, 2014 to April 16, 2016, this was a regional record. Of any of the island leagues, it is second to Académica do Porto Novo of the nearby Santo Antão South Zone

== São Vicente Premier Division - Clubs 2017/18 ==
- Académica - Mindelo
- Batuque - Mindelo
- Castilho - Mindelo
- Derby - Mindelo
- Farense de Fonte Filipe - Mindelo-Fonte Filipe
- Mindelense
- Ribeira Bote - Mindelo-Ribeira Bote
- Salamansa

== Winners ==
=== Island championships ===
==== Before Independence ====
- 1931/32: CS Mindelense
- 1932/33: CS Mindelense
- 1933/34: CS Mindelense
- 1934/35: CS Mindelense
- 1935/36: CS Mindelense
- 1936/37: Sporting de São Vicente
- 1937/38: Sporting de São Vicente
- 1938/39: Sporting de São Vicente
- 1939/40: CS Mindelense
- 1940/41: CS Mindelense
- 1941/42: CS Mindelense
- 1942/43: CS Mindelense
- 1943/44: GD Amarantes
- 1944/45: GD Amarantes
- 1945/46: CS Mindelense
- 1946/47: Académica (Mindelo)
- 1947/48: CS Mindelense
- 1948/49: GD Amarantes
- 1949/50: CS Mindelense
- 1950/51: CS Mindelense
- 1951/52: CS Mindelense
- 1952/53: Académica (Mindelo)
- 1953/54: CS Mindelense
- 1954/55: FC Derby
- 1955/56: Académica (Mindelo)
- 1956/57: CS Mindelense
- 1957/58: FC Derby
- 1958/59: CS Mindelense
- 1959/60: CS Mindelense
- 1960/61: GD Amarantes
- 1961/62: CS Mindelense
- 1962/63: Académica (Mindelo)
- 1963/64: Académica (Mindelo)
- 1964/65: FC Derby
- 1965/66: CS Mindelense
- 1966/67: Académica (Mindelo)
- 1967/68: CS Mindelense
- 1968/69: Académica (Mindelo)
- 1969/70: CS Mindelense
- 1970/71: CS Mindelense
- 1971/72: Académica (Mindelo)
- 1972/73 : GS Castilho
- 1973/74 : GS Castilho
- 1974/75 : CS Mindelense

==== After independence ====
- 1975/76 : CS Mindelense
- 1976/77 : CS Mindelense
- 1977/78 : CS Mindelense
- 1978/79 : CS Mindelense
- 1979/80 : CS Mindelense
- 1980/81 : CS Mindelense
- 1981/82 : CS Mindelense
- 1982/83 : FC Derby
- 1983/84 : FC Derby
- 1984/85 : FC Derby
- 1985/86 : FC Derby
- 1986/87 : Académica (Mindelo)
- 1987/88 : CS Mindelense
- 1988/89 : unknown - CS Mindelense or not held
- 1989/90 : CS Mindelense
- 1990/91 : not held
- 1991/92 : CS Mindelense
- 1992/93 : unknown - CS Mindelense or not held
- 1993/94 : CS Mindelense - Their fourth or sixth consecutive one with the 1991 season with no championship was held or 1989, 1991 and 1993
- 1994/95 : Académica (Mindelo)
- 1995/96 : CS Mindelense
- 1996/97 : CS Mindelense
- 1997/98 : CS Mindelense
- 1998/99 : GD Amarantes
- 1999/00 : FC Derby
- 2000/01 : FC Derby
- 2001/02 : Batuque FC
- 2002/03 : Batuque FC
- 2003/04 : Académica (Mindelo)
- 2004/05 : FC Derby
- 2005/06 : CS Mindelense
- 2006/07 : Académica (Mindelo)

=== Premier Division ===
- 2007/08 : FC Derby
- 2008/09 : CS Mindelense
- 2009/10 : Batuque FC
- 2010/11 : CS Mindelense
- 2011/12 : Batuque FC
- 2012/13 : CS Mindelense
- 2013/14: FC Derby
- 2014/15: CS Mindelense
- 2015-16: CS Mindelense
- 2016–17: CS Mindelense
- 2017–18: CS Mindelense
- 2018–19: CS Mindelense

=== Performance By Club ===
Club	Winners	Winning years
CS Mindelense	50	1932, 1933, 1934, 1935, 1936, 1940, 1941, 1942, 1943, 1946, 1948, 1950, 1951, 1952, 1954, 1957, 1959, 1960, 1962, 1966, 1968, 1970, 1971, 1975, 1976, 1977, 1978, 1979, 1980, 1981, 1982, 1988, 1989, 1990, 1992, 1993, 1994, 1996, 1997, 1998, 2006, 2009, 2011, 2013, 2015, 2016, 2017, 2018, 2019
Académica (Mindelo)	12	1947, 1953, 1956, 1963, 1964, 1967, 1969, 1972, 1987, 1995, 2004, 2007
FC Derby	12	1955, 1958, 1965, 1983, 1984, 1985, 1986, 2000, 2001, 2005, 2008, 2014
GD Amarantes	5	1944, 1945, 1949, 1961, 1999
Batuque FC	4	2002, 2003, 2010, 2012
Castilho (Mindelo)	2	1973, 1974

== Seasons by club ==
The left indicates the participation listed here in the regional championships and since 2008 the Premier Division as of the 2016-17 season, the bold represents its current clubs.

Seasons	Clubs
85	CS Mindelense, FC Derby
79	Amarante
72	Académica do Mindelo, GS Castilho
40s	Falcões do Norte
30s	Ribeira Bote, Farense de Fonte Filipe (Note: Sporting São Vicente until around the 1980s)
21	Batuque
5	Ponta d'Pom, Salamansa
1	São Pedro

== Other competitions ==
=== Champion's Cup ===
A new competition called the São Vicente Champion's Cup, equivalent to the newly created Champions' Trophy was introduced in 2016. The first edition took place on October 15, 2016 and featured a champion from the Premier and the Second Divisions. Mindelense and Ribeira Bote were the first clubs to participate. In the 2017 edition, it will feature the Premier Division champion CS Mindelense and the Second Division participant will be GS Castilho.

- 2016: CS Mindelense
- 2017: Not held

== Other sports ==
=== Basketball ===
The island also has its own basketball championships. The competition is run by the São Vicente Basketball Association (ARBSV, Associação de Basquetebol (or Basquete) de São Vicente). The champion of each season competes at the national level every year.

==== Teams ====
- Académica do Mindelo
- GS Castilho

==== Winners ====
- 2014: Académica do Mindelo

== See also ==
- São Vicente Cup
- São Vicente SuperCup
- São Vicente Association Cup
- Sports in São Vicente, Cape Verde
