= Estádio Municipal Adérito Sena =

Sports stadium in Mindelo, Cape Verde

- Location within Cape Verde
- Former names: Estádio da Fontinha; Campo da Fontinha
- Location: Av. 12 de Setembro; Mindelo, São Vicente, Cape Verde
- Coordinates: 16.8825°N 24.9853°W
- Owner: São Vicente Municipality
- Operator: São Vicente Regional Football Association (ARFSV)
- Capacity: 5,000

Construction
- Opened: 1938

Tenants
- Académica; GD Amarantes; Batuque FC; GS Castilho; Corinthians São Vicente; FC Derby; Cape Verde National Football Team; CS Mindelense

Estádio Municipal Adérito Sena is a multi-use stadium in Mindelo, Cape Verde. It is currently used mostly for football matches and is the home stadium of FC Derby as well as CS Mindelense, Académica, GD Amarantes and Batuque FC and the lesser club of Corinthians São Vicente. The stadium holds 5,000 people and area is 105x68 m and its ground is artificial grass. The stadium is owned by the municipality of São Vicente and is operated by the São Vicente Regional Football Association (ARFSV). It is a certified stadium by FIFA for international competition as well as friendly matches.

It also has the island's only athletic field where it is slightly narrow and dirt.

== Location ==
Its location is at 12 de Setembro which is used as the main road connecting the northeast of the island and in the eastcenter part of the city just east of the city center (also Morada), rarely in the subdivision of Fontinha (formerly Fonte Francés), the stadium is inside the subdivision of Ribeira Bote as a stream is located whose overflows are flowed underneath as the stream remains to be mostly dry, but drier than the flows before the field and the stadium were built. One little spring or a fountain was located in a part where the stadium is located today. A couple of other sports complexes are in the stadium's same location. Concerts and cricket matches are also used.

== Nearby facilities ==
Nearby facilities to the stadium is the football training ground to the east, Liceu Ludgero Lima (Liceu Ludgério Lima), the nation's longest operating secondary institution and the oldest of the two to the southwest and Académica Carlos Alhinho and Polivalente d'Amarante to the west.

== Other competitions ==
Also the Mindelo Cup matches, a friendly match takes place at the stadium once every different years.

== History ==
The field and stadium was possibly the first ever built in Cape Verde, opened in around the mid to late 1930s. The stadium was built on a stream named Ribeira Bote, a 4 km stream that flows around the middle of the island west to Mindelo south of Praça Estrela. The stream flowed southward and today flows underneath Avenida 12 de Setembro and empties into the bay through an underflow tunnel.

The final matches between the winners of the islands of Santiago and São Vicente before independence in 1975 took place at Estádio Fontinha, one of them was in 1972, they were held each year with the exceptions of 1955, 1957 to 1959 and in 1970.

Also in the final years of colonial rule, one of two matches of two Portuguese Cups were played at the field, first, the 1965-66 season where Mindelense lost to CS Marítimo of the Madeira Islands which was played on 9 March and a single 6th round match around April in 1970-71 season where Mindelense lost to Sporting Lisbon 0-21. Mindelense, being the only club from Cape Verde who competed at the Portuguese Club and the only venue ever played in Cape Verde.

Until 1992, the stadium was named Estádio da Fontinha (or Campo da Fontinha). It was renamed and named it after Adérito Carvalho de Sena who played for CS Mindelense and played for several seasons in Boavista FC Porto in the 1930s.

The stadium was renovated in 2006 which included the addition of synthetic turf as the grass was dry and in bad shape due to the climate that is not favorable for natural grass, also its seats were changed and its changerooms were remodeled, they were completed in April 2007. During that time, its matches were played at nearby Alcindo Nascimento.

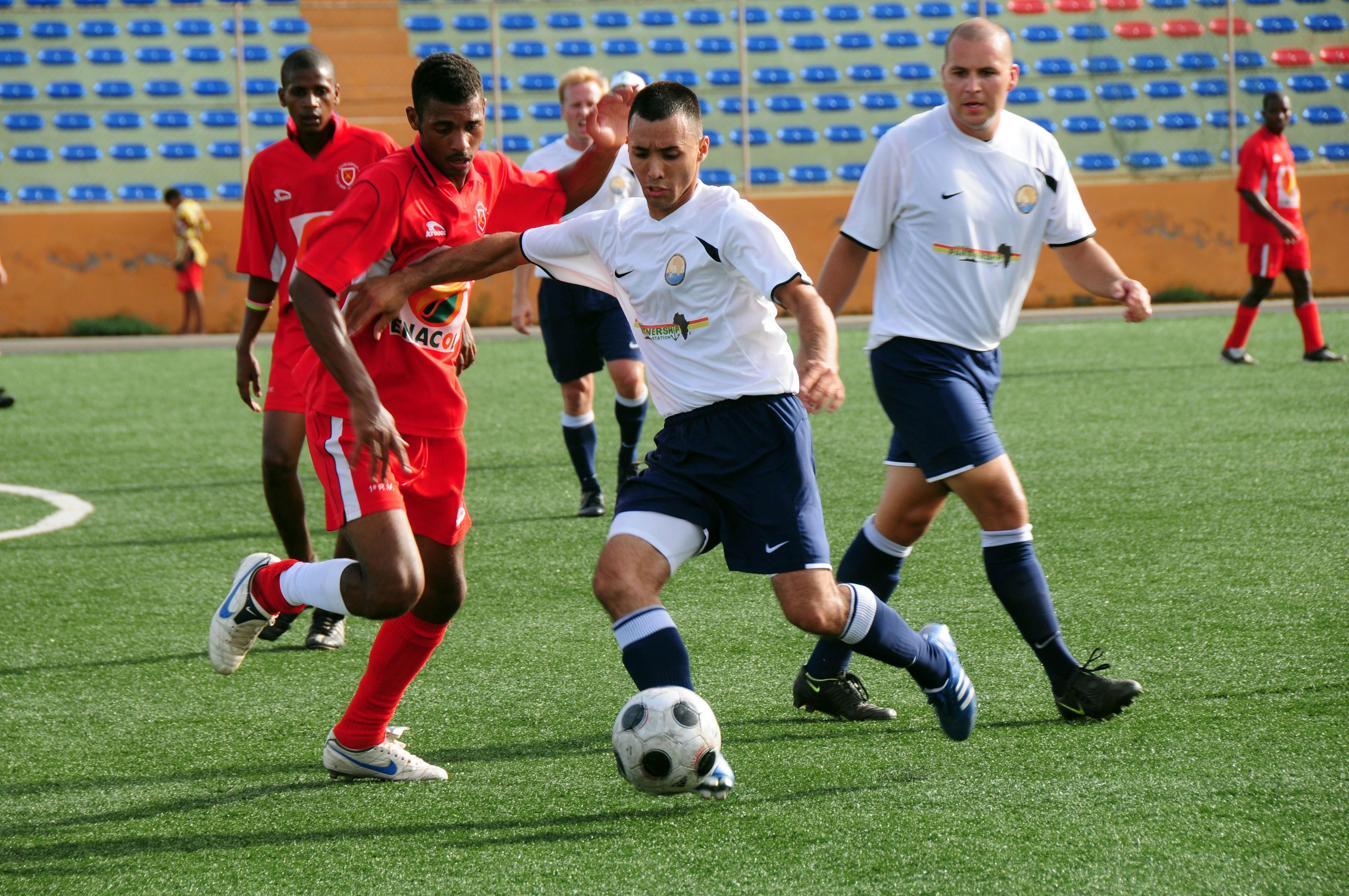
Yeoman 2nd Class Rafael Flores holds off a defender at the stadium on September 10, 2008

On September 10, 2008, the US Navy soccer team of the European Region played a match with the Cape Verdean military team as part of the 11 day sports diplomacy tour which improved understanding and developed goodwill through sports, music and community relations in Cape Verde, Cameroon, and Gabon.

The 2009 Cape Verdean Cup had the group stage matches played at the stadium which featured Group A teams, from the west of the archipelago.

It was recently renovated again in 2014 as artificial turf was added that costed around 600 million escudos (€500,000). The island Super Cup competition took place in the stadium with Batuque defeating Derby on January 13, 2015, this was the first match after renovation.

=== Cape Verdean Football Championships finals ===
Numerous national championship final matches took place in the stadium, one of them was FC Derby who was tied with Académica Operária a goal each on September 3, 2000, Derby later claimed their second title, later in 2005, Derby defeated Sporting Praia 4–3 in the second match and claimed their third title. Derby participated in the 2008 Cape Verdean Football Championships, the first of two final matches took place in the stadium and defeated Sporting Clube da Praia on August 9, a match that was rescheduled, later Sporting Praia defeated Derby. Mindelense played the second final match on July 9, 2011, the club played against Sporting Praia and was a scoreless match, Mindelense won the title with a goal won in two of its matches. Most notably and most recent finals at the stadium were CS Mindelense and the first meeting with Académica do Porto Novo whose first match was at Adérito Sena on July 7 where Mindelense won 3–0 in 2013, in 2014, the first match was at Adèrito Sena and faced Académica do Fogo, Mindelense won 2–1 on May 24, and FC Derby in 2015, both of the matches were played in the stadium on July 4 and 11, Mindelense won the eleventh title after winning 4–3 in penalty kicks, a year later in the 2016 Cape Verdean Football Championships, Mindelense faced Académica do Porto Novo for the second time, the first of the second match took place on July 2 and Mindelense lost a goal in the first match, later they would win the second match and claim the twelfth title.

=== Clubs at the continental competitions ===
Only Mindelense and Derby participated at the continental level and only at the championships. Mindelense was the first and the second Cape Verdean club to compete. The club faced ASEC Ndiambour in the 1992 African Cup of Champions Clubs. Derby participated in the 2001 CAF Champions League and faced Real Banjul.

== Panoramics ==
The stadium can be viewed from the hills and the mountains to the north of Mindelo and northeast as well as the areas west of Monte Verde.

== Transportation ==
Two nearby bus stops are located northwest of the stadium at the corner of Ruas Polivalente de Amarante and Domingos Ramos, there is another bus stop further southwest at the roundabout intersecting Ruas Henrique Sena and Manuel Matos. These stops are also served by minibuses and taxis. Two bus lines of the island's transit system that is nearby the stadium include:

- Morada (City Center)-Fontinha-Ribeira Bote
- Morada (City Center)-Craquinha-Ribeira Julião

== See also ==
- List of football stadiums in Cape Verde
- List of buildings and structures in São Vicente, Cape Verde
- Sports in São Vicente, Cape Verde
