= Batuque FC =

Batuque FC Batuki FK Batúque FK
- Full name: Batuque Futebol Clube
- Nickname: Panteras (Panthers)
- Founded: 5 May 1981
- Ground: Estádio Municipal Adérito Sena, Mindelo, Cape Verde
- Capacity: 5000
- Chairman: João José Cardoso da Silva (Jota)
- Manager: Nhela
- League: São Vicente Island League
- 2015–16: 5th
Home colours	Away colours

Batuque Futebol Clube (Capeverdean Crioulo, ALUPEC: Batuki Futibol Klubi, São Vicente: Batúque Futebol Klube) is a football club that plays in the São Vicente Premier Division in Cape Verde. It is based in the city of Mindelo on the island of São Vicente. Its current president is Jota (João Jose Cardoso da Silva) who became first president in around the mid 2000s. The club's nickname is Panteras (Panthers). Since 30 April 2017, they are one of three unrelegated clubs in the island along with Derby and Mindelense.

Batuque are one of the most successful football clubs on the island, having won about 12 official regional titles, of which, four of them are island or championship titles, four cup titles, three super cup titles and two association cup (opening tournament) titles. Batuque also has a handball team.

== History ==
The club was formed on 5 May 1981 and was founded by players one of them was Jota (João José Cardoso da Silva) and students from Liceu Ludgero Lima located across the stadium southeast of the city center in the subdivision of Monte Sossego. The football club is named after the Cape Verdean music and dancing genre, the batuque. Many of its greatest players took part in European clubs, notably Portuguese clubs.

The club's headquarters was built in 1990. The club celebrated its 10th anniversary in 1991. Later it became a registered club and played their first season in the 1996–97 season. In the 1990s, the coach for Batuque was Alexandre Alhinho, one of the nation's greatest coaches. In 2006, the club celebrated its 25th anniversary and in 2011, its 20th anniversary Around 2012, the next few coach was Piki whose actual name is José Alberto Soares Fermino, his later management gone sour as the club positions slowly dropped from third in 2014, then fourth in 2015 and fifth in 2016, its wins and points totals also dropped and the goal totals which had 22 in 2014 almost dropped by half in 2016.

Nhela replaced Piki in September 2016. Batuque did not have a good start for the 2016–17 season as they did last season, they started second and did slightly better than last season but had the first two matches victorious, first to Falcões do Norteh then to Ribeira Bote, they were fourth at the fourth round after a loss to Derby on 29 January, then third at the ninth round after their win over Ribeira Bote, then fifth at the 11th round after suffering two losses to Salamansa and Derby, Batuque returned to fourth afterwards and they would finish at that position for the season, two last wins were made, first to Farense and lastly Académica do Mindelo. Batuque's final match of the season was a loss to their rival Mindelense which ended in 0–2. Batuque yet again had 20 points, they also scored 14 goals, two more than last season, their only worst was the club conceded 25 goals, the highest in the Premier Division.

Batuque started the 2017–18 season with a win over Salamansa and was in mid-position, a two-goal draw with the mighty Derby came up and was the year's last match. Batuque's first and only match of 2018 which was on 7 January was another win, this time Farense, Batuque took the number spot which Mindelense had for the first two weeks and is their current position, At round two, they had four goals scored, third in the region and later had seven which became second, shared with Castilho. At round 5, they did not lose a single match with their win over the mighty Académica. Batuque was still first with 13 points and 11 goals scored, still second. Batuque underwent two losses before a goal draw was made with Salamansa on 17 February and was third place. Another loss came to Batuque, this one to Derby, then a 1–0 win over Farense de Fonte Filipe. At the ninth round, they had 12 goals alongside Mindelense, a round later with their win over Farense Fonte Filipe, they had 13 goals alongside Académica.. Batuque made an 0–4 win over Ribeira Bote and became second in regional goals numbered 17. Batuque made a 2–0 win over Académica who is suffering another worst season. Batuque remains third and will be in the 13th round and has 19 goals scored.

=== National championship competitions ===
Batuque competed at the national level for the first time in the 2002 season, finishing second with fewer goals than Sporting Praia. The point total of 19 shared with Sporting Praia was the highest total in the national championships; no other club matched that total since, after the restructuring implemented for the following 2017 season it did not even supersede the maximum of 18 but only the combined portion, the new triangular phase became longer than the three early triangular phases but with three groups, this time with a playoff stage with four clubs that featured the second placed club with the most points (sometimes goals if the two has the same points) of that position of each group.

Batuque's second appearance was in 2003 and their first in group stage, they played in Group B and finished third with ten points and did not advance into the playoffs. Seven years later, they made their next appearance and there and played in Group A, they scored the highest match at the nationals defeating Fogo's Botafogo 0–4 on 22 May. The club finished first with 9 points and scored 9 goals and made them advanced to the semis. They challenged Santiago South's mighty Sporting Praia overall for the second time on 19 June and lost 1–0 in the first leg, the second leg was a goal draw and thus Batuque was out of the competition. They came back in 2012 after winning their recent island title and second time in Group A, they had two back to back wins and draws, they lost the final match to Académica Fogo and they failed to qualify into the playoffs after finishing fourth with eight points. Batuque turned a little worse after they loss to their rival Mindelense and became third. Then Batuque lost to Castilho before a single goal draw with Salamansa was made. Batuque went undetermined after they lost to Derby on 25 February. Batuque had 14 points, 12 goals scored alongside Mindelense and four wins, sharing with Castilho.

=== Other regional competitions ===
Batuque won their very first cup title in 2001, five years later they won their second, four years later they won their third after defeating Académica Mindelo and brought the club to their only appearance in the 2010 Cape Verdean Cup. Their fifth title was won in 2014 after defeating FC Derby. Batuque faced Mindelense on 7 March in the regional cup semis and ended in a goal draw which led to the penalty shootout, Batuque finally won 4–5 and got a chance for another cup title in their next cup final appearance in four years, again competed with Derby on 7 April, it went into extra time after no goals were scored and the extra time ended without a goal scored, it went into the penalty shootout and Batuque finally got their next cup title in four years, they claimed their sixth title.

In the 2010 regional super cup, Batuque defeated Académica, the cup winner and became the fourth club to have a title, two years later, Batuque defeated the cup winner Falcões do Norte in the 2012 regional super cup and Batuque became the second club with the most titles behind Mndelense and ahead of Derby and Académica do Mindelo and for a season from late 2013 ahead of Falcões do Norte.

After the stadium was renovated and the artificial turf was added, the 2014 São Vicente Super Cup competition took place in the stadium with Batuque, the cup winner defeating Derby, the champion on 13 January 2015 and made it the first match after renovation, Batuque won their third and recent regional super cup title. At the same time, Batuque was number one in title totals, shared for a season up until 7 November when the club's totals became second behind Mindelense.

Batuque won their first Association Cup title in 2008, their total was third and last, from 2010, it became fourth and last. Batuque won their second and recent title in December 2016 for the 2016/17 season, the club had 17 points, five wins and two draws. Their title total became third overall, shared with Académica Mindelo. Batuque had five wins, shared with Derby, two draws and scored 12 goals, shared with Ribeira Bote, second behind Derby. In the 2016–17 season, Batuque was at the top three positions by the third round and lost their third chance for another title, Batuque finished third behind Mindelense and Derby with 13 points. The club had four wins and a draw and scored 14 goals, shared with the island's magnificent team Mindelense.

=== Other appearances ===
The club appeared as guest alongside a Brava club in the 2016 São Filipe Municipal Tournament in October on the island of Fogo, it was the first two club to appear outside the municipality, the other was Sporting from the island of Brava. The club lost the tournament.

== Stadium ==
The club and plays in the Adérito Sena Stadium with a capacity of once served up to 4,000, now serves 5,000 after the renovation, it is named after one of the first players of the club Adérito Carvalho da Sena (1905–1970). Mindelense, FC Derby, GS Castilho, Académica do Mindelo and Amarante are the other major clubs of the city and the island playing in that stadium along with GD Amarantes. Batuque also trains at the stadium.

== Club identity ==
The club logo has a white pointed shield with black edges. The club name has a big C in the middle and the rest small reading BF, the club name was once displayed on top of the logo. The today's logo has an outer angled shield also rimmed black with the club name on top and its location on the bottom.

Batuque's only rivalry is played against CS Mindelense.

== Honours ==
- São Vicente Island Championships/Premier Division: 4

2001–02, 2002–03, 2009–10, 2011–12

- São Vicente Cup: 6

2000–01, 2005–06, 2008–09, 2009–10, 2013–14, 2017–18

- São Vicente SuperCup: 3

2009–10, 2011–12, 2013–14

- São Vicente Island Opening Tournament: 1

2016–17

== League and cup history ==
=== National championship ===
Season	Div.	Pos.	Pl.	W	D	L	GS	GA	GD	P	Cup	Notes	Playoffs
2002	1	2	8	6	1	1	18	5	+13	19			
2003	1B	3	5	3	1	1	7	4	+3	10		Did not advance	Did not participate
2010	1A	1	5	2	3	0	9	3	+6	9			Semi-finalist
2012	1A	4	5	2	2	1	6	3	+3	8		Did not advance	Did not participate
Total:			23	13	7	3	40	15	+25	46			
Total with playoffs:			25	13	8	4	42	17	+27				

=== Island/Regional Championship ===
Season	Div.	Pos.	Pl.	W	D	L	GS	GA	GD	P	Cup	Notes
2002–03	2	1	-	-	-	-	-	-	-	-		Promoted into the National Championships
2009–10	2	1	14	-	-	-	-	-	-	-	Winner	Promoted into the National Championships
2011–12	2	1	14	-	-	-	-	-	-	-		Promoted into the National Championships
2013–14	2	3	14	9	2	3	22	6	+16	29	Winner	
2014–15	2	4	14	6	3	5	24	22	+2	21		
2015–16	2	5	14	5	5	4	12	8	-4	20		
2016–17	2	4	14	6	2	6	14	15	-1	20		
2017–18	2	3	14	8	2	4	21	13	+8	26	Winner	

=== Association cup ===
Season	Reg. Div.	Pos.	Pl.	W	D	L	GS	GA	GD	P
2016–17	1	1	7	5	2	0	12	6	+6	17
2017	1	3	7	4	1	2	14	7	+7	13

== Statistics ==
- Best position: Semifinalist (national)
- Best position at an association cup: 1st
- Appearances at the Championships:
  - National: 4
  - Regional: 21
- Appearances at the cup competitions:
  - National: Once, in 2010, to be 2
  - Regional: 17
- Appearances in a regional Super Cup competition: 4
- Appearances at an association cup competition: 16
- Total points: 46 (national)
- Total wins: 13 (national)
  - Total wins at home: 7 (national)
  - Total wins away at the National Championships: 7 (6 without playoffs)
- Total matches played: 25 (national)
  - Total matches played at home: 13 (national)
  - Total matches played away: 12 (national)
- Total draws: 7 (regular season), 8 (total) – national
  - Total draws at home at the National Championships: 6 (5 without playoffs)
  - Total draws away: 2 (national)
- Total goals scored: 40 (42 with playoffs) – national
- Highest number of wins in a season: 8 (national), in 2003
- Highest number of points in a season: 19 (national), in 2002 (National record, shared with Sporting Praia)
- Highest number of goals scored in a season: 18 (national), in 2002
- Highest number of draws in a season: 3 (national), in 2003
- Highest scoring match at the National Championships: Botafogo 0–4 Batuque, 22 May 2010
- Total losses: 3 (national)
- Total goals conceded: 17 (national)
- Lowest number of goals scored in a season: 6 (national), in 2012
- Lowest number of points in a season: 8 (national), in 2012
- Highest number of goals conceded in a season: 5 (national), 2002
- Highest number of matches lost in a season:1 (national), three seasons: in 2002, 2003 and in 2012

Other

- Appearance at the São Filipe Municipal Tournament: Once, in 2016
- Appearance at a municipal tournament outside the municipality: Once in 2016

== Managerial history ==
Name	Nationality	From	To
Alexandre Alhinho	Cape Verde	around the 1990s	
Piki (José Alberto Soares Fermino)	Cape Verde	around 2012	September 2016
Nhela	Cape Verde	since September 2016	

== List of players ==
List of Batuque FC players
Name	Nationality	Position	Batuque career	Goals (Note: Regional championships only)	Ref				
Name	Nationality	Position	Batuque career	Goals	Ref	Gilson Manuel Silva Alves	Cape Verde	MF	2004-05
Nivaldo Alves Freitas Santos	Cape Verde	MF	2005–06						
Foryou (Adilson Cruz)	Cape Verde								
Valter Borges	Cape Verde	MF	2007-08; 2012-14						
Mezenga	Cape Verde								
Nando (Fernando Maria Neves)	Cape Verde								
Rosário, Humberto	Cape Verde								
Sequeira, Josimar	Cape Verde								
Vally (Chantre, Valdevindres)	Cape Verde								
Dias, Josimar	Cape Verde								
Rambé (Rosário, Ramilton Jorge Santos do)	Cape Verde	ST	2008-09						
Gomes, Ricardo Jorge Pires	Cape Verde		2009						
Delmiro	Cape Verde	DF	2009-10						
Karr (Edson Jorge Lopes Cruz)	Cape Verde								
Sousa, Kevin	Cape Verde								
Fock (commonly as Bock)	Cape Verde	GK	2011-12; 2013; 2016-present						
Fredson Rodrigues	Cape Verde	MF	2011-13						

=== Youth players ===
List of Batuque FC youth players
Name	Nationality	Position	Batuque career	Goals	Ref				
Name	Nationality	Position	Batuque career	Goals	Ref	Gilson Manuel Silva Alves	Cape Verde	MF	1995-97
Kay	Cape Verde	CB	1998-99						
Nelson	Cape Verde	DF	1999-2000						
Sócrates Oliveira Fonseca	Cape Verde	GK	2007–2011						
Héldon Ramos	Cape Verde	MF	2005–06						
Dani (Mendes Ribeiro)	Cape Verde		2007-08						
Zé Luis	Cape Verde		2008						
Edivândio	Cape Verde	FW	2009						
Joazimar Stehb	Cape Verde	FW	2009						
Ryan Mendes	Cape Verde	FW	2009–10						
Pecs	Cape Verde		2011-12						
Papalelé	Cape Verde	FW	2015?-2017						
