= Académica do Mindelo =

Académica
- Full name: Associação Académica do Mindelo
- Founded: April 1, 1940
- Ground: Av 12 de Setembro; Estádio Municipal Adérito Sena, Mindelo, Cape Verde
- Capacity: 5,000
- Chairman: Julio Wanhon
- League: São Vicente Island League
- 2015–16: 3rd
Home colours	Away colours	Third colours

Associação Académica do Mindelo (Capeverdean Crioulo, ALUPEC or ALUPEK: Akadémika, São Vicente Crioulo: Académica or Akadémika) is a football club that had played in the Premier division and the São Vicente Island League in Cape Verde. It is based in the city of Mindelo on the island of São Vicente and plays in a stadium with a capacity of 5,000. The club is an affiliate of the Portuguese club Académica de Coimbra. It is one of the first teams ever to win a provincial title before independence, in 1953, a year later. There was no further competition until 1956. Académica won their first title since independence in 1989. Other titles includes four for the island including their recent 2006/07 season win and two opening tournaments along with their recent win.

Académica Mindelo is one of the most successful football (soccer) clubs in Cape Verde and the island of São Vicente, having won about 18 official titles, 4 are national and the remaining 14 are regional titles.

There is an educational academy named Académica do Mindelo (Mindelo Academy) located in the city. The club has no relation to that academy. Today the main etymology is with the academy in the city.

== History ==
The club was founded on April 1, 1940, the first of the Académica affiliate in both Cape Verde and West Africa.

Académica do Mindelo celebrated its 50th anniversary of the club's foundation in 1990 and later celebrated its 75th anniversary in 2015.

=== Regional competitions ===
Académica became the region's third club to have a title won in 1948, the club was the third most successful until 1964, with the exception of 1961 to 1963, when it was second with Amarante. After winning their fourth title in 1964, they possess the second most titles in São Vicente, their last one was won in 2007 and was the last they appeared in the nationals, the title total became tied with FC Derby since 2014.

With Alexandre Alhinho as coach in the late 1980s, it would be a successful year for the club; they won a title in 1987; in 1989, they were runner-up in the regionals behind Mindelense. Later in the 2000s, the club had good players such as Carlos Lima, Sténio and Kadú. Later on, Kadú chose to play with Mindelense. From 2007 to 2009, the best player in the club was Sténio, a year later, he moved to the same club where Kadú went.

In the Opening Tournament, Académica was the island's third club to possess a title done in 2002, from 2003, their rankings became second behind almighty Mindelense, Académica won their second and final title that became the Association Cup won in the 2006–07 season and was solely the second club to possess the most titles. In 2010, their titles became shared with Derby and Académica's totals is now third behind Derby.

Académica do Mindelo participated in the 2007 regional super cup played in 2008 and claimed their only title after defeating FC Derby, their title totals was also shared with that club and from 2010 Batuque. Académica as cup winner came back to challenge the champion Batuque in the 2010 super cup played in 2011, it was the club's second and final appearance and lost the title to that club. Académica's super cup title total became third with Derby behind Batuque, their title total was shared with Falcões do Norte from 2013, from 2017, the club's single title total became fourth and last alongside Falcões.

Académica Mindelo was relegated once in the early to mid 2010s to the Second Division, the club returned to the Premier Division in the 2014–15 season after being in the top two positions. The sponsor for the 2014–15 season was MOAVE. Also in the season, the club celebrated its 75th anniversary on April 1. Académica finished 7th which brought them to their promotional match that the club won six in the first match over Castilho, the second match was tied at three, with a total of nine goals, Académica was kept in the Premier Division.

Académica participate in the 2016 Association Cup, the club finished sixth in the Premier Division with 7 points and two wins, the club scored 7 goals alongside Farense which was second in the Premier Division. In the same time, Académica's title totals is now shared with Batuque's. The 2016–17 season had a good start and up to the middle of the week had their positions above Mindelense. In the first part of the season, Calú was with the club. The club was thought to be first place up to the 13th round (originally with 29 points), in April, Derby made a protest that the club was using a goalkeeper with a fake identity. On April 24, the Disciplinary Council of the Cape Verdean Football Federation, removed every points that the fake goalkeeper had played totalling 11 and included one with Salamansa, Derby, Farense, the almighty Mindelense and Ribeira Bote, from February 25, they were the first three matches and the last two matches on April 15. Their positions were dropped from first to fifth and also, their National qualification was lost., all this will remove the coach from the club and formed the club's part of some match fixing. The second-place position was replaced by FC Derby, earlier positions were also changed, the club was actually third, then fifth and their points was 18. But they did well on an April 1 match over Falcões do Norte as no fake goalkeeper took part. After that, Académica's final match of the season was a win over Derby 0–2 and finished third with 21 points and had 7 wins and losses behind CS Mindelense and FC Derby, Farense took the fifth position and fourth was Batuque.

Académica Mindelo started the regional season with the association cup, Académica Mindelo lost the first round match and Académica Mindelo is in the mid position at the sixth round already unable to win another title. Académica finished fourth place, better than last season, they also had 10 points, three wins, a win more than last season, and a draw the same, yet again scored seven goals, sixth and last in the Premier Division, shared with Ribeira Bote. Académica Mindelo started the 2017–18 regional Premier Division championships in the second week of December with a victory over Ribeira Bote, up next were fourth straight losses, first to the almighty Mindelense, then Castilho, then the non-powerful Salamansa and recently Batuque, currently the club is sixth place. During the break in the Premier Division on January 20, 2018, the regional cup begun, it seemed they were successful in that competition as they defeated Ribeira Bote in penalties after the match ended without any goals scored. Académica continued their worst, a very minimal relief the club made with two consecutive draws with three goals each in rounds 7 and 8. Académica lost to their rival Mindelense on February 24, and is seventh with a small chance of a probable decisional matches and a very small chance of another relegation. Académica recently made a win over Castilho and has eight points and 13 goals. A week later, unexpectedly suffered a loss to Salamansa and had a small chance of relegation but a mid to high chance of decisional matches, a level inescapable up to the 13th round. Académica had 14 goals scored, fourth in the region alongside Castilho. Another loss the club suffered, it was to Batuque and had one last chance of escaping the relegation zone by the final round, partial or wholly with two more matches, a loss to Derby, then victory over Farense Fonte Filipe on March 30, Académica finished 7th and repeatedly headed to play in the division decisional matches with second placed Ponta d'Pom. On April 7, they defeated Ponta d'Pom 0–2 in the first leg, the second leg ended in a two-goal draw, with 4 goals over 2, Académica became pleased that they will remain in the Premier Division next season.

=== Appearance during late-Portuguese control ===
Académica was the first champion of the Cape Verdean Provincial (Colonial) Championships as they defeated Vitória da Praia 2–0, the club also scored the first goals of the colonial era. The total was shared with Mindelense in 1954 and the totals became second behind that club from 1956, their totals was later shared with Sporting Praia in 1961 and Boavista Praia two years later. Académica won another title in 1964 after defeating Sporting Praia 2–0 and won another title which remained second and it became two. Three years later, Académica Mindelo defeated Praia's Travadores 2–0 in the 1967 championships and won their third and final provincial title, overall they were still second in totals. In 1972, Académica went for an attempt for another title which is being the last one during Portuguese rule. Once more they faced Travadores, the first leg ended in a double goal draw and lost the second leg 1–0 and the title, this was also their last appearance before independence three years later. Académica Mindelo scored a total of 9 goals at the provincial championships, one the second highest behind Mindelense.

=== National appearances ===
After winning their 1987 regional title, the club competed in the national championships and lost a match and was knocked out. As Mindelense won the 1988 national title, Académica was runner-up and headed all the way to the 1989 finals to claim their only national title after defeating SC Santa Maria from the island of Sal.

In 1995, Académica Mindelo was among the three clubs who entered the triangular phase, they included Boa Vista's Académica Operária and Santiago's Boavista da Praia. The club never competed two matches as they withdrew and together with Académica Operária, lost the title to Boavista da Praia.

Académica Mindelo enjoyed the 2004 season and had three wins, two draws and 11 points similarly to other clubs including Sal's Académico do Aeroporto and Boa Vista's Sal Rei. Sal Rei had 12 goals scored in the regular season coming second, the club had 11 goals scored and was immediately out of the competition. Académica do Mindelo had two draws first with Académico do Aeroporto at the first round with a goal, then a scoreless one with Sal Rei on May 22.

The team won their tenth and final insular title and entered the national division in 2007, the club was first in Group A with 13 points and won four matches, and scored the most in the nation with 16 goals. After several years, the team managed to head into the finals and challenged their rival from the island of Santiago Sporting Clube da Praia. The first leg of the match was nil each and the second leg was tied at one. The most points went to the opponent and lost the national title to Sporting in mid-July, earlier than early-August. Académica fans were worried and did not celebrate the victory. Kadú scored the most goals at the nationals, numbering nine.

== Stadium ==
The club and plays in the Adérito Sena Stadium with a capacity of once served up to 4,000, now serves 5,000 after the renovation, it is named after one of the first players of the club Adérito Carvalho da Sena (1905–1970). Mindelense, FC Derby, Amarante and Batuque are the other major clubs of the city and the island playing in that stadium along with GS Castilho. Batuque also trains at the stadium.

== Logo ==
Its logo is identical with Académica de Coimbra, the only difference is it has the letter M. It is also the logo for basketball and athletics.

== Uniform ==
The logo and the uniform as well as other teams with the name Académica and Académico in Cape Verde are identical to Académica de Coimbra. From 2015 to 2017, its clothing were supplied by MOAVE. Its clothing are currently supplied by Nike.

Home uniform until September 2017
Visitor's uniform until September 2017

== Rivalry ==
Académica's only rivalry is with CS Mindelense, one of the longest in Cape Verde and the second longest in the region. After the creation of the regional division in 2008, the rivalry did not appear in one part of the early 2010s up until 2014 as Académica played in the Second Division. It appeared in other regional competitions.

At the national rival, their rival was with Sporting Praia from the island of Santiago Sporting's rivalry with Académica Mindelo entirely disappeared today, a tiny part was the national championship restructuring for the upcoming 2017 season done in November 2015.

== Honours ==
- Cape Verdean Championship: 2
  - Before independence: 3
    - 1953, 1964, 1967
  - After Independence: 2
    - 1989, 2022
- Taça Nacional de Cabo Verde: 1
  - 2023
- São Vicente Island Championships/Premier Division: 10
  - 1948, 1953, 1963, 1964, 1967, 1972, 1986–87, 1994–95, 2003–04, 2006–07
- São Vicente SuperCup: 1
  - 2006–07
- São Vicente Opening Tournament/Association Cup: 2
  - 2001–02, 2006–07

== League and cup history ==
=== Provincial era ===
Year	Final(s)		Club	Result
1953	Won			Champion
1963	Lost		Boavista FC	Finalist
1964	Won			Champion
1967	Won			Champion
1972	2–2	1–0	CD Travadores	Finalist

=== National championship ===
Season	Div.	Pos.	Pl.	W	D	L	GS	GA	GD	P	Notes	Playoffs
2004	1A	1	4	3	1	0	13	2	+11	10		4th place
2007	1A	1	5	4	1	0	16	0	+16	13		Finalist

=== Island/Regional Championship ===
Season	Div.	Pos.	Pl.	W	D	L	GS	GA	GD	P	Cup	Notes
1988–89	2	2	-	-	-	-	-	-	-	-		Also promoted into the National Championships
2003–04	2	1	-	-	-	-	-	-	-	-		Promoted into the National Championships
2006–07	2	1	14	-	-	-	-	-	-	-		Promoted into the National Championships
2013–14	3	1	10	-	-	-	-	-	-	-		Promoted into the Regional Premier Division
2014–15	2	7	14	3	2	9	11	18	-7	11		Remains in the Premier Division
2015–16	2	3	14	5	7	2	15	10	+5	22		
2016–17	2	3	14	7	0	7	18	21	-3	21		
2017–18	2	7	14	3	2	9	15	22	-7	11		Remains in the Premier Division after defeating Ponta d'Pom

=== Association cup ===
Season	Reg. Div.	Pos.	Pl.	W	D	L	GS	GA	GD	P
2006–07	1	1	7	-	-	-	-	-	-	-
2016–17	1	6	7	2	1	4	7	11	-4	7
2017	1	4	7	3	1	3	7	6	+1	10

== Statistics ==
- Best position: 1st (national)
- Best position at an Opening Tournament/Association Cup: 1st
- Appearances at a regional cup competition: 17
- Appearances at the championships:
- National: 11
- Regional: 83
  - Premier Division: 82
  - Second Division: Once, in the 2014–15 season
- Appearance in a regional Super Cup competition: Once
- Appearances at an association cup competition: 16
- Highest number of points in a season: 13, in 2007

== Former player ==
- (Cape Verde) Sténio, played during the 2008–09 season

== Managerial history ==
- (Cape Verde) Alexandre Alhinho (late 1980s and September 26, 2012-13/14)

== Other clubs ==
Other clubs include basketball and volleyball.

=== Basketball ===
Académica do Mindelo
- Arena: Polidesportivo do Mindelo

Académica do Mindelo has its own basketball club. It is a member of the São Vicente Regional Basketball Association.

Its games are played at Polidesportivo do Mindelo located next to Estádio Municipal Adérito Sena forming the São Vicente Sports Complex.

Académica do Mindelo won their national competition title in 2013/14.

==== Achievements ====
- São Vicente Island Championship: 1 listed

2014

- Cape Verdean Basketball Championships: 1 listed

2014

==== Statistics ====
- Best position: 1st (national)
