= GD Amarantes =

GD Amarante
- Full name: Grêmio Desportivo Amarante
- Founded: 1936
- Ground: Estádio Municipal Adérito Sena, Mindelo, Cape Verde
- Capacity: 5,000
- League: São Vicente Second Division
- 2016–17: 3rd

Grêmio Desportivo Amarante or Amarante (Capeverdean Crioulo, ALUPEC or ALUPEK: GD Amarantis, São Vicente: GD Amarante) is a football club that had played in the Premier division and plays in the São Vicente Island League in Cape Verde. It is based in the city of Mindelo in the island of São Vicente.

== Honours ==
- Cape Verdean Championship: 1

1999

- São Vicente Island League: 4

1944, 1945, 1961, 1998/99

- Sâo Vicente Association Cup: 1

2015/16

== League and cup history ==
=== Colonial era ===
- 1961: Amarantes lost the final competition to Sporting Clube da Praia

=== National championship ===
Season	Div.	Pos.	Pl.	W	D	L	GS	GA	GD	P	Notes	Playoffs
1999	1A	1	6	4	1	1	8	5	+3	13	Advanced into the finals	Champion
Total:			6	4	1	1	8	5	+3	13		

=== Island/regional championship ===
Season	Div.	Pos.	Pl.	W	D	L	GS	GA	GD	P	Cup	Assoc	Notes
2013–14	2	4	14	6	0	8	25	18	+7	18			
2014–15	2	3	14	5	6	3	22	19	+3	21	Finalist		
2015–16	2	8	14	3	0	11	11	29	-18	9		Winner	Relegated to the Regional Second Division
2016–17	3	3	10	-	-	-	-	-	-	-	Semi-finalist		
