= Santiago Island League =

- Founded: 1953
- Region: Santiago Island, Cape Verde
- Number of clubs: 12 (up to 2002); 2 in 2009
- Promotion to: Cape Verdean Football Championship (up to 2002)

The Santiago Island League was a regional football championship played in all of Santiago Island until 2002 when it was broken up into two present divisions, the North and the South zones, Cape Verde. It formed a part of the Santiago Regional Football Association (Associação Regional de Futebol de Santiago, ARFS) The winner of the championship had played in Cape Verdean football Championships of each season.

The island league was one of the two oldest in Cape Verde. Until the 1960s, the league included clubs from the entire southern portion of Cape Verde and functioned as a regional league.

From 2000 to 2002, it only contained a single match where as the champion of the South Zone competed with the North Zone and qualified into the National Championships. From 2002, it received separate qualification of the North and South Zones. Though, the island championship returned in 2009 for a season, it featured a single match with the winner of the North and South Zones competing for the single island championship (without qualification as the North and South Zones qualified separately), Académica da Praia won the championship.

Up to 2002, no association used the abbreviative form of ARFS other than the island of Santiago, Sal Regional Football Association's Portuguese language abbreviative form was read as ARFSL.

== Winners ==
=== Before independence ===
- 1953: Vitória
- 1954: CD Travadores
- 1955-1959 : unknown
- 1959/60 : CD Travadores
- 1960/61 : Sporting Clube da Praia
- 1961/62 : unknown
- 1962/63 : Boavista
- 1963/64 : Sporting Clube da Praia
- 1964/65 : Académica (Praia)
- 1965/66 : unknown
- 1966/67 : CD Travadores
- 1967/68 : Académica (Praia)
- 1968/69 : Sporting Clube da Praia
- 1969/70: CD Travadores?
- 1970/71 : unknown
- 1971/72 : CD Travadores
- 1972/73 : Vitória
- 1973/74 : Sporting Clube da Praia
- 1974/75 : unknown

==== Performance By Club ====
Club	Winners	Winning years
CD Travadores	5 listed	1954, 1960, 1967, 1970?, 1972
Sporting Clube da Praia	4 listed	1961, 1964, 1969, 1974
Académica (Praia)	3 listed	1964, 1965, 1968
Vitória FC (Praia)	2 listed	1953, 1973
Boavista FC (Cape Verde)	1 listed	1963

=== After independence ===
- 1975/76 : Boavista FC
- 1976/77 : Sporting Clube da Praia
- 1977/78: Sporting Clube da Praia
- 1979-82 : unknown
- 1982/83: Boavista FC
- 1983/84: Sporting Clube da Praia
- 1984/85 : Sporting Clube da Praia
- 1985-86 : unknown
- 1986/87 : Boavista FC
- 1987/88 : Sporting Clube da Praia
- 1988/89 : Académica (Praia)
- 1989/90 : Desportivo da Praia
- 1990/91 : Sporting Clube da Praia
- 1991/92 : CD Travadores
- 1992/93 : Boavista FC
- 1993/94 : CD Travadores
- 1994/95 : Boavista FC
- 1995/96 : CD Travadores
- 1996/97 : Sporting Clube da Praia
- 1997/98 : Sporting Clube da Praia
- 1998/99 not held
- 1999/00 : CD Travadores
- 2000/01 not held
- 2002 : Sporting Clube da Praia defeated Desportivo de Santa Cruz
- 2009: Académica da Praia defeated Scorpion Vermelho of the North Zone

==== Performance By Club ====
Club	Winners	Winning years
Sporting Clube da Praia	9 listed	1977, 1978, 1984, 1985, 1988, 1991, 1997, 1998, 2002
CD Travadores	4 listed	1992, 1994, 1996, 2000
Boavista FC (Cape Verde)	5 listed	1976, 1983, 1987, 1993, 1995
Académica (Praia)	2 listed	1989, 2007
Desportivo da Praia	1 listed	1990

== After the first full break up to the single island competitions ==
The next meeting between a club from the north and the South Zone would be the 2006 Cape Verdean Football Championships between Sporting Praia and Beira-Mar on June 3. As Sporting won a national title, two clubs from the South Zone competed, one of them challenged a North Zone club, in 2007, Académica Praia defeated Scorpion Vermelho on June 24 of Group B, in 2008, it was ADESBA and Scorpion Vermelho at Round 2 of Group B., in 2009, it was Sporting and Estrela dos Amadores at Round 5 of Group B, in 2010 it was Sporting Praia and Scorpion Vermelho at the last round of Group B, in 2011, it was Sporting Praia and Benfica Santa Cruz of the first round of Group A, in 2012, it was Sporting Praia and Estrela dos Amadores at the last round of Group A, in 2013, it was Sporting Praia and Scorpion Vermelho at the last round in Group B, in 2014, it was Sporting Praia and Grémio Nhagar at the fourth round in Group A, in 2015, it was Boavista Praia and Beira-Mar Tarrafal at the first round of Group A and in 2016, the last official meeting was Desportivo da Praia and Varandinha Tarrafal, at the first round of Group A in a rescheduled match which was played on June 1.

The 2017 featured three groups, unlike Santo Antão who played in the same group, Group B, the two participants from the island played in two different groups.

Their recent meeting was a friendly competition at the GAFT Cup with the last being Benfica de Santa Cruz and Desportivo da Praia.

== See also ==
- Praia Cup, sometimes as the Santiago Cup, as there was another competition titled the Praia Cup, the common name was the Santiago Cup or the Santiago Island Cup
- Sports in Santiago, Cape Verde
