= Sports in Santiago, Cape Verde =

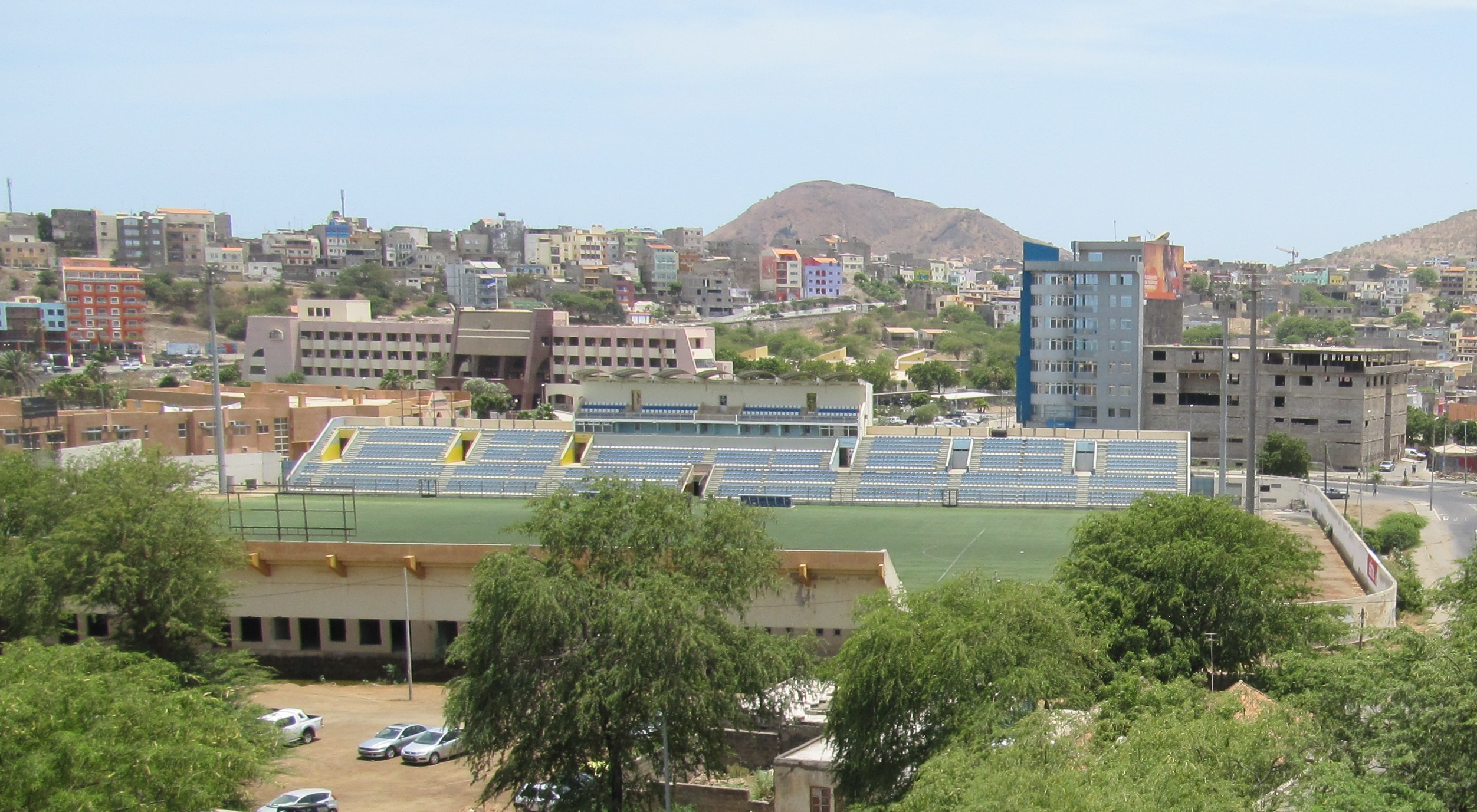
Estádio da Várzea, the major stadium in Cape Verde, home of Praia's top football (soccer) clubs

The island of Santiago in Cape Verde in the middle of the Sotavento Islands is home to several teams and clubs. The major professional clubs are Sporting Praia, Boavista Praia and CD Travadores, semi-pro teams includes Académica da Praia and Desportivo da Praia. From its foundation in 1953 to 1999, the island had a single league of each sport. Since that time, the association and competition are currently divided into two zones, the north (the championships and the association) and the south (the championship and the association) and includes all sports including football, basketball, volleyball, futsal and athletics, the only island to have nearly all the sport competitions into two zones.

As Praia is the Capverdean capital, the Capeverdean Football, Basketball, Volleyball, Athletics and Futsal Federations are headquartered in the city, much of them in the neighborhood of Várzea and nearby Chã das Areias.

== Football (soccer) ==
Football (soccer) remains to be the most popular sport both in the island and the nation. The island has 45 football (soccer) clubs, of which 44 are competing on the island, 22 in each of the two zones, each has 12 in the Premier Division and 10 in the Second Division since 2016. One from the North Zone, Barcelona is not competing. The other three no longer exists today. There are three professional clubs, two amateur semi-pro clubs, the top three are even the most popular clubs in the country. In the 2015-16 season, the Santiago North Zone had the longest season of any of the island leagues in Cape Verde, Varandinha finished with a record breaking 60s points.

The oldest football and sports club on the island as well as Praia is Sporting Clube founded on December 2, 1929. The first club in Cape Verde that would be related to a Portuguese club. Travadores is the second oldest club founded in 1930 and Vitória is the third oldest founded in 1931, since Vitória was founded, Santiago island has the most clubs in two zones in Cape Verde. Grémio Nhágar was the island's first club founded in the 21st century. Tira Chapéu and Relâmpago are the newest clubs on the island. Sporting Praia is the last club on the island who won a national championship title in 2012. Since 2014, Sporting Praia has the second most national football titles after Mindelense of São Vicente Island.

The South Zone's clubs are Académica, ADESBA, Benfica, Boavista Praia, Celtic, Desportivo da Praia, Eugênio Lima (formerly Lapaloma), Garridos, Sporting Praia, Tchadense, Travadores and Vitória in the Premier Division and Asa Grande, Delta, Fiorentina, Kumunidade, Relâmpago, Ribeira Grand, Tira Chapêu, Unidos dos Norte, Varanda and Vilanova in the Second Division. One club that never registered Aliança CV may be a part of Unidos do Norte today. The North Zone's clubs are AJAC, Beira-Mar, Benfica, Desportivo da Calheta, Desportivo de Santa Cruz, Estrela dos Amadores, Flor Jovem, Grémio Desportivo de Nhagar, Associação Juventus, Scorpion Vermelho, União Picos and Varandinha in the Premier Division and ADEC, Chão Bom, Delta Cultura, Desportivo de Assomada, Esperança, Inter Cutelo, Portas Abertas, Real Júnior and São Lourenço FC in the Second Division. Three clubs Os Amigos (Assomada), Barcelona and Juventude de Assomada are absent.

Former clubs includes África Negra of Milho Branco which existed up until the 1990s, Andorinha which existed up to the late 2000s and Black Panthers which appeared in the late 2000s.

Of the 45 existing clubs, the largest are concentrated in Praia numbering 20, around 40% of the island's clubs, 10 are based in a locality (20% of the island total), two are based in Achadinha de Baixo the other are based in each neighborhood. 7 are based in Assomada, two are based in each of its neighborhood, Cutelo and Nhagar. Tarrafal has 6 clubs, Pedra Badejo with three, Calheta de São Miguel with two and some places have a club each.

Between 1953 and 1974, the champion competed in the colonial championship game with the winner of the island of São Vicente. From 1976 to 1983, the champion faced a team from another part of the Sotavento Islands in the national championship games. Since 1984, the champion competes in the group stage of the national competition. Sometimes a national champion from the island continued to remain in the national championships, sometimes a second place club from the island competed. In the 1990s and the early 2000s, it did not compete. Garridos played in the North Zone until 2010, it became the only club to switch to the South Zone.

Three clubs, Sporting, Boavista and Travadores have competed in the continental competitions.

Overall, Praia has the most titles won numbering about 60, 13 since the breakup. Tarrafal was the second place to win a title on the island for the South Zone, it is the first in the South Zone, second in the island with seven, Santa Cruz with six and Santa Catarina and São Miguel with a title each.

Also there are two regional cup competitions, super cup competitions in which features a champion and a cup winner (sometimes a second place cup winner when a champion is also a cup winner) and an opening tournament. The cup was the first to be created in Cape Verde in the late 1970s.

The island also features some municipal football (soccer) tournaments, the newest is the GAFT Cup featuring teams from the municipality of Tarrafal, it was first held in 2016.

The most popular friendly competition is Boavista FC's Champion's Cup (Taça de Campeões), it was first held in October 2014 in honor of the 75th anniversary of the foundation of the club. The first edition featured clubs from the island, the second featured some foreign clubs, the third featured one from the island, Sporting Praia and the other two from other parts of the nation.

== Basketball ==
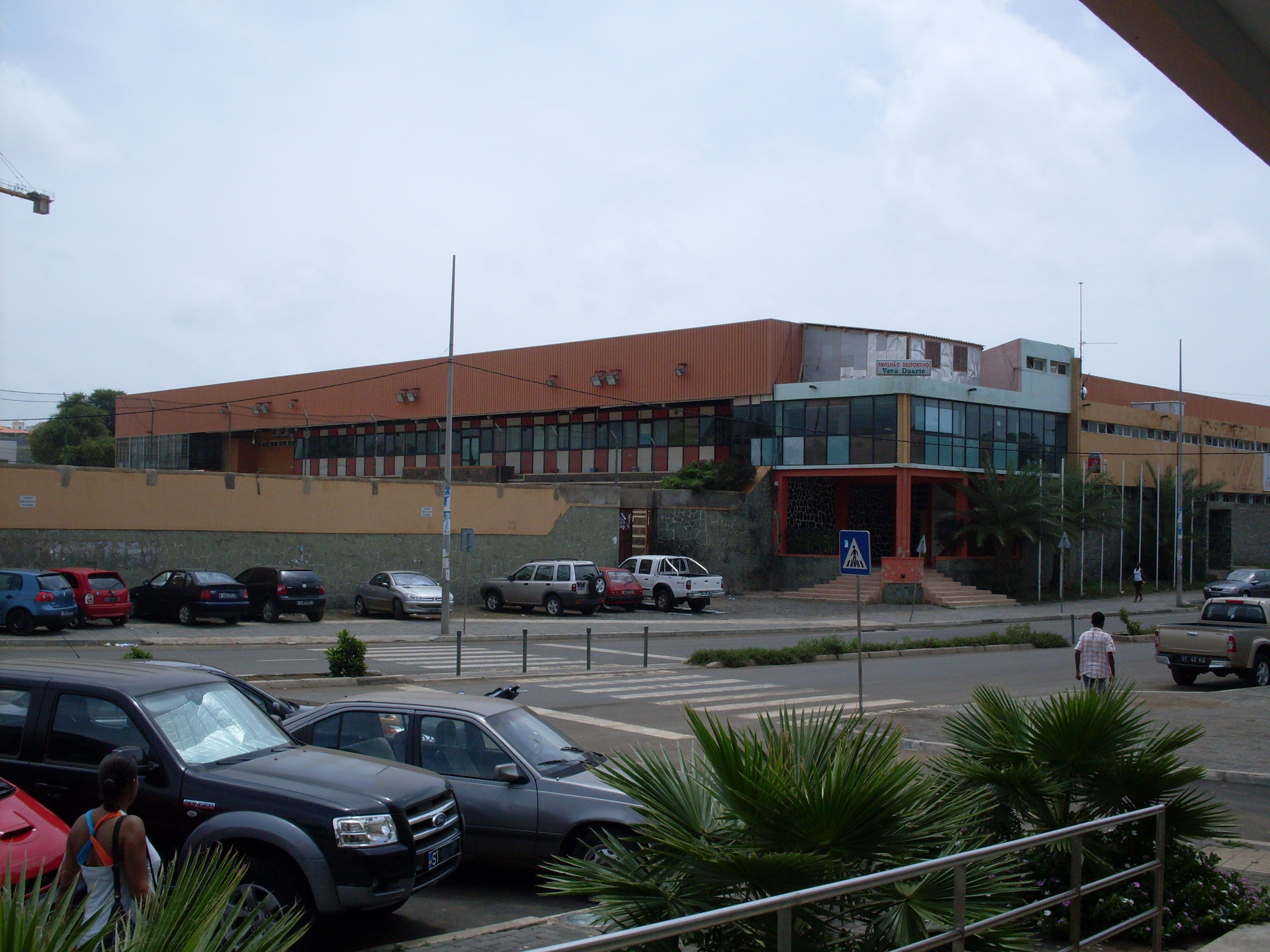
Gimnodesportivo Vavá Duarte, the major sports arena in Cape Verde, home of Praia's top basketball, volleyball and futsal clubs

Basketball is the second most popular sport on the island. Its most popular clubs are ABC Praia and Desportivo da Praia. Lapaloma (later Eugénio Lima), probably withdrawn, AD Bairro and Black Panthers are the other clubs. The champion competes in the national basketball championships each season. AD Bairro became the first club to compete in the African competitions in 2015.

Travadores once had a basketball club but it was eliminated in 2004.

Praia has the most titles won on the island, some are won by a neighborhood, Craveiro Lopes with Bairro numbering two.

Basketball venues include Gimnodesportivo Vavá Duarte and the one in Tarrafal near its football field.

== Tennis and Badminton ==
Tennis and badminton has recently increased in popularity in Cape Verde along with the island. The main tennis complexes are in the west of Várzea in the west of the Praia.

== Volleyball ==
Volleyball is another sport in Cape Verde, one of the most popular and is unknown that is less popular than futsal today. ABC could be one of the clubs. All of its matches are played with Gimnodesportivo Vava Duarte in Chã das Areias. Beach volley is another sport played at nearby Gamboa Beach.

== Other sports ==
Futsal, athletics, water polo and chess are other sports on the island. Athletics are competed at the Complexo Desportivo Adega, one of the only on the island. Futsal matches are played at Gimnodesportivo Vava Duarte. Water polo is very rare in Cape Verde.

== Sporting events ==
Numerous National Championship finals took place several times at Estádio da Várzea and its predecessor. Some Colonial Championships was held at the stadium between 1953 and 1975. The 2002 championship winner Sporting Praia the celebration took place at the stadium. Since the number of final matches was doubled in 2000, each match took place at Várzea from 2004 to 2009, also in 2011 and in 2012.

== Stadium and arenas ==
Stadium	Town / City	Capacity	Type	Tenants	Region	Opened
Estádio da Várzea	Praia	8,000	Football	Sporting, Boavista, Desportivo, Travadores, Vitória, ADESBA, Tchadense	Santiago South	
Estádio de Cumbém	Assomada	2,000	Football	Os Amigos, Desportivo de Assomada, Grémio Desportivo Nhagar	Santiago North	2008
Gimnodesportivo Vava Duarte	Praia	2,000	Basketball; Volleyball; Futsal	ABC Praia, Black Panthers, Eugênio Lima (Lapaloma), Seven Stars, CD Travadores	Santiago South; Santiago (probably) - futsal	
Estádio Municipal 25 de Julho	Pedra Badejo	1,000	Football	Desportivo de Santa Cruz, Scorpion Vermelho	Santiago North	2008
Estádio de Mangue	Tarrafal	1,000	Football	Amabox Barcelona, Beira-Mar, Chão Bom, Estrela dos Amadores, Real Júnior Varandinha	Santiago North	2008
Achada Santo António (Note: Not a wide field)	Praia	500	Football	Tchadense (Note: Home base, only used for practices)	Santiago South	
Estádio da Calheta	Calheta de São Miguel		Football	AJAC, Flor Jovem da Calheta	Santiago North	2008
Calabaceira	Calabaceira, Praia	500	Football	Os Garridos and Ribeira Grande - Primary use and Fiorentina Calabaceira, Unidos do Norte, Vila Nova - Secondary use	Santiago South	
Nora, Campo de	Nora, east of São Domingos		Football	Os Garridos - Secondary use	Santiago South	
Ponta d'Água	Ponta da Àgua, Praia	500	Football	Unidos do Norte, Vila Nova	Santiago South	2015

=== Sports complexes ===
Stadium	Town / City	Capacity	Type	Tenants	Region
Complexo Desportivo Adega	Praia		Football; Athletics; Other sports	none in football (soccer)	Santiago South (Note: Athletics)

=== Smaller football (soccer) fields ===
- Achada Grande Frente - turf added in 2015, the stadium is used for practices
- Achada de São Filipe - used for practices
- Castelão - used for practices
- Milho Branco - used for practices, former field of África Negra, a club never registered into the regional association
- Portal - used for practices
- Sucupira - home of Académica da Praia until 2006, located north of Estádio da Várzea in the neighborhood of Várzea, Praia, the stadium is used for practices
- Tira Chapéu - turf added in 2015, used for practices by the club Tira Chapéu

== See also ==
- Sport in Cape Verde
- Arts and culture in Santiago, Cape Verde

Sport in other islands:

- Sports in Fogo, Cape Verde
- Sports in Sal, Cape Verde
- Sports in Santo Antão, Cape Verde
- Sports in São Vicente, Cape Verde
