= Santiago North Regional Football Association =

- Founded: 1999
- Locations: Assomada, Santiago, Cape Verde; Estádio de Cumbém
- Affiliations: Cape Verdean Football Federation
- Website: Official website
- Remarks: Domestic cup: Santiago North Cup; Santiago North Super Cup

The Santiago North Regional Football Association (Portuguese: Associação Regional de Futebol de Santiago Norte, abbreviation: ARFSN) is a football (soccer) association covering the north of the island of Santiago. It is headquartered in the city of Assomada, in the middle of the island. The winner of the championship plays in the Cape Verdean football Championships of each season. The football association is the second largest behind Boa Vista and ahead of Santo Antão South. The association are one of three championship competitions that play in more than one stadium.

== About the Island/Regional League ==
The area includes the northern part of the island and includes the municipalities of Santa Catarina, Santa Cruz, São Lourenço dos Órgãos, São Miguel, São Salvador do Mundo and Tarrafal

== Logo ==
Its logo features the north of the island, its municipalities that are included with geographical features including places, streams, routes and mountain names being one of the few logos in the world displaying these features to a regional sports association and is Cape Verde's only one displaying it. Its shores are lined with pink and a football (soccer ball) is on the top right. The association name in Portuguese is on the bottom.

== Organization ==
The association also organizes and functions the Santiago North Regional Championship competitions, the Cup and the Super Cup, there is no Opening Tournament competitions due to financial concerns. The association has 23 registered clubs, two are former, Beira-Mar is the only semi-pro club on the island. No pro clubs are in the region. The regional champion competes in the National Championships each season, once did in the cup (2007, 2009, 2010, 2012) competition who competed at the national level. The association has the third largest number of clubs after Santiago's two zones and ahead of São Vicente. The regional championships has two divisions, each with ten clubs.

- Santiago North Premier Division (12 clubs)
- Santiago North Second Division (10 clubs)

== About the Island/Regional Association ==
The league was formed in 1999, the champion qualified into the single island championship which challenged the South Zone champion and the winner qualified into the National Championships, in 2003, the Santiago Island League was split into the north and south zones and was formally created, the two are the youngest island league in Cape Verde. Since 2003, the club has both Premier and Second Divisions, from 2006 they went into disuse and in the 2006/07 season, the league was split into the northcentral and southcentral groups and several teams from the Second Level from the north became a single group. Clubs from São Domingos would participate in the South Zone as a couple of more clubs were created in the North Zone, also being almost equal to half of the island's population. Also up to 2010, it had the largest land area of the football association in Cape Verde, the Boa Vista Regional Football Association took the position afterwards.. Unlike other island leagues, between 2012 and 2015, it had the first and second phases and a playoff system in which the first four clubs would participate. The 2015/16 season now features 14 clubs and the first regional league in Cape Verde to have up to 26 rounds. After nearly nine years, the Second Division was restored and features six clubs.

In its early years up to the 2014 season, it had the second most number of clubs in the country after the South Zone and ahead of São Vicente, later Fogo. It once had the most in the 2015-16 season. Together with the island's South Zone, it had the most number of clubs in the country until 2017, the association now has the most number of clubs in the country with 24 clubs, 10 in the Premier Division and 14 in the Second Division.

The regional cup and the super cup was competed once in 2007. Financial problems did not let the cup and the super cup competitions continue in the island's North Zone.

== Registered clubs ==
The region's registered clubs as of March 2018 include.

- ADEC - Calheta
- AJAC - Calheta
- Beira-Mar - Chão Bom/Tarrafal
- Benfica - Santa Cruz
- Chão Bom (also as Tchon Bom or Txon Bon)
- Dangerous AC Assomada
- Delta Cultura - Tarrafal
- Desportivo de Assomada
- Desportivo da Calheta
- Desportivo de Santa Cruz - Santa Cruz
- Esperança - Assomada
- Estrela dos Amadores (Tarrafal)
- Flor Jovem - São Miguel
- Grémio Desportivo de Nhagar - Assomada
- FC Inter Cutelo-Salina
- Juventude de Assomada
- Associação Juventus
- Associação Nhagar
- ADE Nova Esperança
- AD Portas Abertas
- Real Júnior - Chão Bom/Tarrafal
- São Lourenço FC - São Lourenço
- Scorpion Vermelho - Pedra Badejo and Santa Cruz
- União Picos
- Varandinha - Tarrafal

== Former clubs ==
- Os Amigos - Assomada
- Barcelona - Tarrafal - unknown status that it still exists today
- Filhos de São Miguel
- Fontes
