= Estádio da Calheta =

Sports stadium in Cape Verde

- Location within Cape Verde
- Location: Veneza near Calheta de São Miguel, Santiago, Cape Verde
- Coordinates: 15.1939°N 23.5982°W
- Capacity: 1,000

Construction
- Opened: 2008

Tenants
- ADEC; AJAC; Desportivo da Calheta; Flor Jovem

Estádio da Calheta is a multi-purpose stadium in the village of Veneza (not far from the center) northwest of the town limits of Calheta de São Miguel in São Miguel, Cape Verde, just off the Praia-Pedra Badejo-Tarrafal Road (EN1-ST02). It is one of four that are operated by the Santiago North Regional Football Association (ARFSN). The stadium is home to Calheta's best clubs including AJAC, Desportivo da Calheta and Flor Jovem, recently it is the home field of ADEC. All clubs participate in the Santiago Island League North Zone, two in the Premier Division and ADEC in the Second Division.

The stadium is also used as a training ground before its matches.

== History ==
The football (soccer) field was created around the late 20th century. Construction was completed around the late 2000s and clubs based in the municipality started to play at the stadium.

In 1999, football clubs from Tarrafal and Calheta de São Miguel played in that stadium. When Estádio da Calheta was constructed in 2008, all of its clubs plays at the stadium.

The stadium was used for the Cape Verdean Football Championships once in 2005 featuring Flor Jovem, it was scheduled to play three of its matches, only two were played, the last one which was in the last round against Paulense was not played. The 2016-17 Santiago North Premier Division went into uncertainty as the field (AJAC) and Estádio Municipal 25 de Julho (Benfica Santa Cruz) were going to be used for the 2017 national football championships. AJAC fielded a suspended player Marco Aurélio during a match with Juventus which they originally won 2-4 which was played in Estádio de Cumbém on April 1, the 16th round. As a result, on May 11, Benfica de Santa Cruz were crowned champions and its matches for the 2017 season will be played at its home stadium 25 de Julho. AJAC was punished by the regional association and would have been relegated to the Second Division in the following season for being fake champions. After a decision by the FCF, the stadium will have the second national championships taking place at the stadium featuring AJAC. As the national season started, AJAC or Vulcânicos, the first match which is supposed to be on May 13 may be awarded to one of the clubs.

== Panoramics ==
The stadium can be viewed from the east and the middle of the municipality. It offers a view of the island of Maio on the east side as it is partly in an elevated area.

== See also ==
- List of football stadiums in Cape Verde
- List of buildings and structures in Santiago, Cape Verde
- Sports in Santiago, Cape Verde
