= Football records and statistics in Cape Verde =

This article concerns football records in Cape Verde. Unless otherwise stated, records are taken from the Cape Verdean National Championships and the second-tier Regional Championships.

== National level ==
=== National Championships ===
==== Titles ====
- Most titles: 12, Mindelense

==== Appearances ====
- Most seasons in the National Championships overall: Mindelense
- Fewest seasons in the National Championships: 1 season, joint record, some of the clubs are: AJAC da Calheta, GD Amarantes, Beira Mar (Maio), Beira-Mar (Tarrafal), Benfica de Santa Cruz, GD Corôa, Cutelinho, Desportivo Estância Baixo, Desportivo de Santa Cruz, GDRC Fiorentina, Flor Jovem da Calheta, Grémio Nhágar, Marìtimo, Onze Estrelas, Sanjoanense, Spartak d'Aguadinha, Varandinha
- Most recent first time appearances into the National Championships as of 2017: AJAC da Calheta of the Santiago North Zone

=== Wins ===
- Most wins at the National championships overall (excluding playoffs): 6 wins, Sporting Clube da Praia and Batuque FC (2002)
- Most wins at the National Championships: 7 wins, FC Derby (2008)
- Most wins at home: 6 matches. CS Mindelense (2014))
- Most wins at home in the regular season: 5 (joint record):, Derby (2008), Mindelense (2015)
- Most wins away:, joint record: 4 matches, CS Mindelense (2011, 2016), SC Atlético (2012)

=== Draws ===
- Most two-match draws at the finals in a season: Once (2015)

==== Losses ====
- Most losses at the National Championships in a season: 7 losses, Académica da Brava (2002)

==== Points ====
- Most points in a season (3 points for a win): 19. joint record (2002)
  - Sporting Clube da Praia
  - Batuque

==== Goals ====
- Most goals scored in a season: (34) Sporting Clube da Praia (2005)
- Most goals scored in a regular season: (24) Sporting Clube da Praia (2005)
- Most home goals scored in a season: 23, Sporting Clube da Praia (2005)

==== Scorelines ====
- Record win: Sporting Clube da Praia 13–0 Desportivo Estância Baixo, 11 June 2005

==== Individual ====
- Most goals in a season: 14, Zé de Tchecha (for Sporting Clube da Praia 2005)

=== Cape Verdean Cup ===
- Most wins: 2: Boavista FC (2009, 2010)
- Most consecutive wins:, 2, Boavista FC (2009, 2010)
- Most appearances in a final: 2, Boavista FC (2009, 2010)
- Most appearances without winning: 2, Académica do Sal (2007, 2009)
- Biggest win: 3 goals: Académica da Praia 3–1 Académica do Sal (2007)
- Most goals in a final: 3 goals: Académica da Praia 3–1 Académica do Sal (2007)
- Most defeats in a final:2, Académica do Sal (2007, 2009)

== Regional competitions ==
=== Regional Championships, second-tier ===
==== Titles ====
- Most titles by any of the island leagues: 49, Mindelense, São Vicente

==== Wins ====
- Most wins in a season: 20, GD Varandinha, Santiago North Zone, 2016
- Fewest wins in a season (in a championship more than ten clubs): 1

=== Draws ===
- Most draws in a season: 12, Estrela dos Amadores, Santiago North Premier Division, 2016

==== Goals ====
- Highest number of goals scored in a season: 72, Spartak d'Aguadinha, Fogo, 2014–15
- Highest number of goals conceded: 104, Parque Real, Fogo, in the 2014–15 season

==== Games without a loss ====
- Best season (overall): Académica do Porto Novo – all matches won, in 2012, Santo Antão South Zone
- Best season (with 20+ matches): 20 wins, GD Varandinha, in 2016 – Santiago North Zone
- Longest unbeaten streak at the Regional Championships:53, Académica do Porto Novo (2011 – April 23, 2016), Santo Antão South Zone)
- Most games without a loss at home at the Regional Championships: around 40, Académica Porto Novo, Santo Antão South Zone (since 2011)
- Most games without a loss away at the Regional Championships: around 25, Académica Porto Novo, Santo Antão South Zone (around 2012 – April 23, 2016)

==== Games without a win ====
- Most games without a win at the Regional Championships in two tiers: 26, GDRC Delta, Santiago South (April 25, 2015 – January 9, 2017)
- Most games without a win at the Regional Championships: 50, FC Talho, São Nicolau (March 3, 2013 – January 14, 2017)
- Most games without a win in a season: 22, Delta, Santiago South (2015–16)
- Most games without a win overall: about 70, FC Talho, São Nicolau (March 3, 2013 – December 13, 2016)

==== Scorelines ====
- Record win: Académica da Praia 21–0 Os Garridos, Santiago, 1968
- Most goals in a game: 21, Académica da Praia 21–0 Os Garridos, Santiago, 1968

==== Points ====
- Most points in a season (3 points for a win): 63, GD Varandinha, Santiago North Zone, 2016

=== Regional Cups ===
- Most titles of any of the regional cups: 11 Académica do Porto Novo, Santo Antão South Zone
