= List of football stadiums in Cape Verde =

This is a list of football (soccer) stadiums in Cape Verde, ranked in descending order of capacity. The minimum capacity is 1,000. It includes:

- The stadiums of all clubs in the top two tiers of the Cape Verdean football league system as of the 2016–17 season (Cape Verdean Football Championships and the Regional Premier Divisions), with rankings within each league given.
- The stadiums of teams from Cape Verde which play in national leagues of other football associations, as of the 2016–17 season.

== Current stadiums ==
#	Image	Stadium	Capacity	City	Region	Home team(s)
1		Estádio Nacional de Cabo Verde	15,000	Praia	Santiago South Zone	National football team
2		Estádio da Várzea	8,000	Praia	Santiago South Zone	Sporting, Boavista, Desportivo, Travadores, Vitória, ADESBA, Tchadense
3		Estádio Marcelo Leitão	8,000	Espargos	Sal	Académica do Sal, Académico do Aeroporto, Juventude, Verdun Pedra de Lume
4		Estádio Municipal do Porto Novo	8,000	Porto Novo	Santo Antão South Zone	Académica, Fiorentina, Marítimo, Sporting
5		Estádio Municipal Adérito Sena	5,000	Mindelo	São Vicente	Académica, Amarante, Batuque, Corinthians, Derby, Mindelense
6		Estádio Orlando Rodrigues	5,000	Tarrafal de São Nicolau	São Nicolau	AJAT'SN, FC Praia Branca, Ultramarina
7		Estádio Francisco José Rodrigues	5,000	Mosteiros	Fogo	Atlético Mosteiros, Cutelinho, Grito Povo, Nô Pintcha dos Mosteiros
8		Estádio Municipal do Maio	4,000	Cidade do Maio	Maio	Académico 83, Onze Unidos
9		Estádio de Cumbém	2,000	Assomada	Santiago North Zone	Os Amigos, Desportivo de Assomada, Grémio Desportivo Nhagar, Juventus Assomada
10		Estádio João Serra	2,000	Ribeira Grande	Santo Antão North Zone	Rosariense, Solpontense
11		Estádio 25 de Julho	1,000	Pedra Badejo	Santiago North Zone	Desportivo de Santa Cruz, Scorpion Vermelho
12		Estádio João de Deus Lopes da Silva	1,000	Ribeira Brava	São Nicolau	SC Atlético, Desportivo Ribeira Brava
13		Estádio de Mangue	1,000	Tarrafal	Santiago North Zone	Amabox Barcelona, Beira-Mar, Chão Bom, Estrela dos Amadores, Real Júnior Varandinha
14		Estádio 5 de Julho	1,000	São Filipe	Fogo	Académica do Fogo, ABC de Patim, Baxada, Botafogo, Desportivo de Cova Figueira, Juventude (Fogo), Spartak d'Aguadinha, União de São Lourenço, Valěncia, Vulcânicos

== Old stadiums ==
- Estadio 20 de Janeiro - Maio
- Estadio Municipal Amílcar Cabral - Porto Novo, Santo Antão
- Estadio do Espargos - Sal
- Estadio de Sal Rei - Boa Vista
- Campo de Tarrafal - Tarrafal de São Nicolau, São Nicolau

== See also ==
- List of association football stadiums by capacity
- List of African stadiums by capacity
- Lists of stadiums
