= 2010 Cape Verdean Football Championships =

Cape Verdean Football Championship
- Season: 2010
- Champions: Boavista FC (Cape Verde)
- Matches played: 36
- Goals scored: 110 (3.06 per match)
- Biggest home win: Sporting Praia, FC Boavista

The 2010 Cape Verdean Football Championship season was the 31st of the competition of the first-tier football in Cape Verde. Its started on 8 May, slightly later than the last season and finished on 10 July, later than last year. The tournament was organized by the Cape Verdean Football Federation. It was the second consecutive time that the final featured two clubs from the same island and city, the next time it happened would be five years later. It brought the Capital Rivalry between Sporting and Boavista to the national championships. Another club of Praia named Boavista FC (Cape Verde) winning the national title breaking Sporting Praia's consecutive title wins. A month later, Boavista Praia would become the only club to win both the championship and the cup title in the same season.

== Overview ==
Sporting Clube da Praia was again the defending team of the title. A total of 12 clubs participated in the competition, one from each island league and one who won the last season's title. 36 matches were played and 110 goals were scored. It marked the last appearance of Botafogo of the island of Fogo.

The biggest win were Sporting (2-7 defeated Ribeira Brava) and Boavista (7-1 defeated Solpontense).

The final round match between Ribeira Brava and Barrererense was not played, later, the federation awarded both teams a loss.

== Participating clubs ==

Participating football (soccer) clubs of the 2010 Cape Verdean Football Championships (Cape Verde)
- Sporting Clube da Praia, winner of the 2009 Cape Verdean Football Championships
- Sporting Clube da Boa Vista, winner of the Boa Vista Island League
- SC Morabeza, winner of the Brava Island League
- Botafogo FC, winner of the Fogo Island League
- Barreirense, winner of the Maio Island League
- Académico do Aeroporto, winner of the Sal Island League
- Scorpion Vermelho, winner of the Santiago Island League (North)
- Boavista FC (Cape Verde), runner-up of the Santiago Island League (South)
- Solpontense FC, winner of the Santo Antão Island League (North)
- Marítimo, winner of the Santo Antão Island League (South)
- Desportivo Ribeira Brava, winner of the São Nicolau Island League
- Batuque FC, winner of the São Vicente Island League

=== Information about the clubs ===
Club	Location	Venue	Capacity
Académico do Aeroporto	Espargos	Marcelo Leitão	8,000
Barreirense	Barreiro	20 de Janeiro	
Batuque FC	Mindelo	Adérito Sena	5,000
Boavista FC	Praia	Várzea	12,000
Botafogo FC	São Filipe	5 de Julho	1,000
Desportivo Ribeira Brava	Ribeira Brava	João de Deus	1,000
Marítimo	Porto Novo	Amílcar Cabral	
SC Morabeza	Vila Nova Sintra	Aquiles de Oliveira	500
Scorpion Vermelho	Santa Cruz	25 de Julho	1,000
Solpontense FC	Ponta do Sol	João da Serra	2,000
Sporting Clube da Boa Vista	Sal Rei	Arsénio Ramos	500
Sporting Clube da Praia	Praia	Várzea	12,000

== League standings ==
=== Group A ===
Pos	Team	Pld	W	D	L	GF	GA	GD	Pts
1	Batuque FC	5	2	3	0	9	3	+6	9
2	Boavista FC	5	2	2	1	15	8	+7	8
3	Marítimo	5	2	1	2	7	9	-2	7
4	SC Morabeza	5	1	3	1	5	4	+1	6
5	Botafogo	5	1	2	2	8	13	-5	5
6	Solpontense FC	5	1	1	3	7	14	-7	4

=== Group B ===
Pos	Team	Pld	W	D	L	GF	GA	GD	Pts
1	Académico do Aeroporto	5	4	1	0	12	4	+8	13
2	Sporting Clube da Praia	5	3	2	0	16	6	+10	11
3	Scorpion Vermelho	5	2	0	3	7	8	-1	6
4	Sporting Clube da Boa Vista	5	1	2	2	4	8	-4	5
5	Desportivo Ribeira Brava	5	1	1	3	6	12	-6	4
6	Barreirense	5	0	0	5	5	12	-7	0

== Results ==
Week 1
Home	Score	Visitor	Date
Batuque	2 - 0	Marítimo	8 May
Botafogo	3 - 2	Solpotense	8 May
Morabeza	0 - 0	FC Boavista	9 May
Sporting Praia	5 - 2	Barreirense	8 May
Académico Aeroporto	3 - 1	Scorpion Vermelho	8 May
Sporting Boavista	2 - 2	Ribeira Brava	8 May

Week 2
Home	Score	Visitor	Date
FC Boavista	4 - 2	Botafogo	15 May
Solpotense	1 - 1	Batuque	15 May
Marítimo	1 - 0	Morabeza	16 May
Barreirense	3 - 4	Académico Aeroporto	15 May
Scorpion Vermelho	2 - 0	Sporting Boavista	15 May
Ribeira Brava	2 - 7	Sporting Praia	15 May

Week 3
Home	Score	Visitor	Date
Botafogo	0 - 4	Batuque	22 May
FC Boavista	3 - 4	Marítimo	22 May
Morabeza	3 - 1	Solpotense	23 May
Académico Aeroporto	2 - 0	Ribeira Brava	22 May
Sporting Boavista	1 - 1	Sporting Praia	22 May
Scorpion Vermelho	2 - 1	Barreirense	22 May

Week 4
Home	Score	Visitor	Date
Marítimo	2 - 2	Botafogo	30 May
Batuque	1 - 1	Morabeza	30 May
FC Boavista	7 - 1	Solpotense	30 May
Barreirense	0 - 1	Sporting Boavista	29 May
Sporting Praia	0 - 0	Académico Aeroporto	29 May
Scorpion Vermelho	1 - 2	Ribeira Brava	29 May

Week 5
Home	Score	Visitor	Date
Batuque	1 - 1	FC Boavista	6 June
Solpotense	2 - 0	Marítimo	6 June
Morabeza	1 - 1	Botafogo	6 June
Sporting Praia	3 - 1	Scorpion Vermelho	11 June
Ribeira Brava (awarded a loss against the club)	canc.	Barreirense (awarded a loss against the club)	5 June
Académico Aeroporto	3 - 0	Sporting Boavista	5 June

== Final Stages ==
Semi-Finals				Finals
Boavista FC	0	1	1
Académico do Aeroporto	0	1	1	Boavista FC	2	1	3
Sporting Clube da Praia	1	1	2	Sporting Clube da Praia	0	0	0
Batuque FC	0	1	1

=== Semi-finals ===
20 June 2010

FC Boavista	0:0	Académico do Aeroporto

Estádio da Várzea
Praia
19 June 2010

Sporting Clube da Praia	1:0	Batuque FC

Estádio da Várzea
Praia
26 June 2010

Académico do Aeroporto	1:1	FC Boavista

Estádio Marcelo Leitão
Espargos
26 June 2010

Batuque FC	1:1	Sporting Clube da Praia

Estádio Municipal Adérito Sena
Mindelo

=== Finals ===
3 July 2010

FC Boavista	2:0	Sporting Clube da Praia

Estádio da Várzea
Praia
11 July 2010

Sporting Clube da Praia	0:1	FC Boavista

Estádio da Várzea
Praia

Cape Verdean Football 2010
Champions
Boavista FC
3rd title

== Statistics ==
- Biggest win: Boavista FC 7 - 1 Solpontense (May 30)

== See also ==
- 2009–10 in Cape Verdean football
- 2010 Cape Verdean Cup
