= Estádio de Cumbém =

Sports stadium in Santiago, Cape Verde

- Location within Cape Verde
- Location: Assomada, Santiago, Cape Verde
- Coordinates: 15.0887°N 23.6677°W
- Capacity: 2,000

Construction
- Opened: 2008

Tenants
- Desportivo de Assomada; Juventus Assomada; Associação Nhágar e Boa Entrada; Esperança; Inter Cutelo Salinas; Grémio Nhágar; Portas Abertas; União Picos

Estádio de Cumbém, also as Estádio Municipal de Cumbém is a multi-purpose stadium in the city of Assomada, seat of the municipality of Santa Catarina in the Santiago, Cape Verde and is located in the suburb of Cumbém located south of the centre, accessed with Avenida 15 de Dezembro. It is one of four that are operated by the Santiago North Regional Football Association (ARFSN) and serves as its headquarters of the North Zone. The stadium is home to Assomada's best clubs including Desportivo de Assomada, the top five of the North Zone and Juventude Assomada, clubs based in Assomada's neighborhoods includes Associação Nhágar e Boa Entrada, Esperança FC, Grémio Nhágar and Inter Cutelo Salinas, clubs based in the municipality is Portas Abertas, clubs based outside Santa Catarina is União Picos from São Salvador do Mundo. A former club played at the stadium included Os Amigos and Juventude de Assomada. All clubs participate in the Santiago Island League North Zone

The stadium is also used as a training ground before its matches by clubs mentioned above at the stadium.

== History ==
The football (soccer) field was created in around the 1960s and was Campo de Assomada and was closer to the town center and located near the avenue that was later called 15 de Dezembro. In the 1980s, it became Estàdio de Assomada, clubs from the middle of the island played at the field and its matches were not official until 1999 when the Santiago North Zone Championships was founded. From 2003 to 2008, clubs based in the municipalities of Santa Catarina and Santa Cruz and from 2005, São Salvador do Mundo and São Lourenço dos Órgaos played at the field. The stadium would be moved to the subdivision of Cumbém located in the south of the city at the foot of Monte Xexê. It was finished in 2008 and clubs played at the stadium. Clubs based in Santa Cruz and São Lourenço dos Órgaos would play at Estádio 25 de Julho.

The stadium was used for the Cape Verdean Football Championships once in 2014, the last one in the North Zone, three of the five matches that featured Grémio Nhágar played at the stadium. At the 16th round match on April 1 which was played at the stadium, AJAC fielded a suspended player Marco Aurélio during a match with Juventus Assomada which they originally won 2–4, on May 11, AJAC was punished by the regional association for being fake champions which meant Juventus Assomada was awarded 3–0.

== See also ==
- List of football stadiums in Cape Verde
- List of buildings and structures in Santiago, Cape Verde
- Sports in Santiago, Cape Verde
