= Patas (footballer) =

Cape Verdean footballer

Personal information
- Full name: Pedro Joaquim Furtado Moreno
- Date of birth: 20 July 1986 (age 40)
- Place of birth: Tarrafal, Cape Verde
- Height: 1.80 m (5 ft 11 in)
- Position: Midfielder

Team information
- Current team: GS Loures

Senior career*
Years	Team	Apps	(Gls)
2007–2008	Varandinha		
2010	Estrela Amadores		
2010–2012	Águias do Moradal	43	(1)
2012–2014	Benfica e Castelo Branco	61	(0)
2014–2015	Santa Clara	11	(0)
2015	Loures	6	(0)
2016–2018	Castelo Branco	58	(0)
2018–2019	Torreense	16	(0)
2019–	GS Loures	12	(0)
- * Club domestic league appearances and goals as of 21:34, 13 May 2019 (UTC)

Pedro Joaquim Furtado Moreno (born 20 July 1986), simply known as Patas is a Cape Verdean professional footballer who plays for Grupo Sportivo de Loures in Portugal mainly as a midfielder.

== Club career ==
Born in Tarrafal, Patas kicked off his career in 2007 with local Cape Verde sides. In 2010, he came to Portugal signing with Águias Moradal in the third tier. After spending two successful season, he joined Benfica Castelo Branco in the same tier in 2012.

In 2014, he signed for Segunda Liga club Santa Clara on a two-year contract.
