= Santiago South Regional Football Association =

Santiago South Regional Association
- Founded: 2002
- Locations: Praia; Estádio da Várzea (8,000) Estadio da Calabaceira
- Affiliations: Cape Verdean Football Federation
- Website: Official website

Santiago South Regional Football Association (Portuguese: Associação Regional de Futebol de Santiago Sul, abbreviation: ARFSS, not commonly as ARFSZS) is a football (soccer) association covering the south of the island of Santiago, it is an affiliate of the Cape Verdean Football Federation. It is headquartered in the city of Praia. The association covers the municipalities of Praia, Ribeira Grande de Santiago and São Domingos.

The season features 12 clubs in the premier division for the second time, Varanda and Delta were relegated into the Second Division, Tchadense and Benfica were promoted last season. In the second division, it is another season featuring ten clubs, two new clubs competed for the first time, Relâmpago and Tira Chapêu.

== Logo ==
Its logo has an edged crescented crest and features a football (soccer ball) and on the bottom are the Portuguese language acronym ARFSS.

== History ==
Santiago was the first island league to feature a second division league, it was once known as the second level. It was founded in 2002 after the Santiago Island League was split into two. The south zone would have its seat in Praia. When it was created it wholly covered the Praia until the formation or Ribeira Grande de Santiago in 2005 that split the western part of the municipality. In 2010, clubs from the municipality of São Domingos started to play with the association. Until 2014-15 it had a total of 20 clubs, each had ten clubs, later two were added to the Premier Division totalling 12 and eight clubs played in the Second Division for the 2015–16 season. Two additional registered clubs started to play in the lowest division for the 2016–17 season and now totals ten with 22 overall.

== Organization ==
The association also organizes and functions the regional championships, the Cup, the Super Cup and the Opening Tournament. The association has 22 registered clubs, Sporting and Boavista are pro-clubs. The regional champion competes in the National Championships each season, once did in the cup (2007) and super cup (2013) competition who competed at the national level. The regional championships has two divisions

- Santiago South Premier Division (12 clubs)
- Santiago South Second Division (10 clubs)

== Registered clubs ==
The region's registered clubs as of late 2016 include.

- Académica da Praia - Premier Division
- ADESBA - Craveiro Lopes neighborhood, Praia - Premier Division
- Asa Grande - Achada Grande (Leite (where the club is based) and Tras) - Second Division
- Benfica da Praia - Premier Division
- Boavista Praia - Premier Division
- Celtic da Praia - Achadina de Baixo neighborhood, Praia - Premier Division
- Delta - Praia - Second Division
- Desportivo da Praia - Premier Division
- Calabaceira Fiorentina - Calabaceira neighborhood, Praia - Second Division
- Os Garridos - São Domingos - Second Division
- Kumunidadi/Kumunidade - Second Division
- Eugénio Lima FC - based in the homonymous neighborhood, Praia - Premier Division
- Relâmpago - Second Division
- Ribeira Grande de Santiago - Cidade Velha - Second Division
- Sporting Praia - Premier Division
- Tchadense - Achada Santo Antônio neighborhood - Premier Division
- AD Tira Chapéu - based in the homonymous neighborhood - also serves the west of Praia - Premier Division
- Travadores - Praia - Premier Division
- Unidos do Norte (União dos Norte) - Achada Grande Tras, Paiol, Achada São Filipe and the north of Praia - Second Division
- Varanda - Craveiro Lopes neighborhood, Praia - Second Division
- GDRC Vila Nova (Vilanova) - based in the homonymous neighborhood and covers the north of Praia - Second Division
- Vitória - Praia - Second Division

== Former clubs ==
- Andorinha - São Domingos, now part of Os Garridos
- Associação Juvenil Black Panthers - late 2000s

=== Clubs before it became merged ===
- Avenida 77 - now part of Benfica da Praia
- Jentabus - now part of Benfica da Praia
- Paiol - now part of Unidos do Norte
- Praia Rural - now part of Unidos do Norte
