= Estádio Municipal 25 de Julho =

Sports stadium on Santiago Island, Cape Verde

- Location within Cape Verde
- Location: Pedra Badejo, Santiago, Cape Verde
- Coordinates: 15.1414°N 23.5335°W
- Operator: Santiago North Regional Football Association
- Capacity: 1,000

Construction
- Opened: 2008

Tenants
- Benfica; Desportivo de Santa Cruz; Scorpion Vermelho

Estádio Municipal 25 de Julho is a multi-purpose stadium in the town of Pedra Badejo in the municipality of Santa Cruz on the east of Santiago Island, Cape Verde, it is hundreds of meters west of the center and the Atlantic and hundreds of meters north of the old Praia-Pedra Badejo-Tarrafal highway. The stadium is named after one of the holidays celebrated on July 25. It is currently used mostly for football matches. The stadium holds 1,00 people and its dimensions is 100 x 64 meters. It is operated by the Santiago North Regional Football Association (ARFSN). The stadium is home to Pedra Badejo's best clubs including Scorpion Vermelho, Benfica (one of three on the island, two are called Benfica, the other is in Praia) and Desportivo. All clubs participate in the Santiago Island League North Zone.

The stadium is also used as a training ground by the three clubs before its matches.

== History ==
The football (soccer) field started construction in 2006 and was finished in 2008 replacing the nearby dirt field.

In 1999, football clubs from Santa Catarina and the middle of the island played in that stadium. When Estádio de Cumbém was constructed in 2008, all of its clubs based in São Miguel plays at that stadium. Os Garridos played in the stadium until 2010, after that, clubs from São Domingos switched to the South Zone including Garridos.

The stadium was used for the Cape Verdean Football Championships in 2007, 2008 and 2010 with Scorpion Vermelho, 2010 with Benfica Santa Cruz and the last in 2013 with Scorpion Vermelho, from 2007, only the group stage matches took place at the stadium.

In the 2014-15 regional season, it was the stadium where Tarrafal's Beira-Mar was crowned champion.

In January 2017, construction began for a new stand with larger capacities, new changerooms and an artificial turf, it will be completed in July.

On May 11, AJAC was punished by the regional association which meant Benfica de Santa Cruz would play three of its group stage matches at the stadium, a dispute has risen as Benfica Santa Cruz protested on an unknown problem of AJAC Calheta de São Miguel. Led by some other clubs of the North Zone of the Premier Division, the FCF decided that AJAC became officially regional champions and became the recent club after Varandinha to win their first and only title. No national matches will be taken place at the stadium. Scorpion Vermelho won their fifth regional title and the stadium has three of the six matches currently being played for the 2018 National Division

== Panoramics ==
The stadium can be viewed from most parts of Pedra Badejo.

== See also ==
- List of football stadiums in Cape Verde
- Sports in Santiago, Cape Verde
- List of buildings and structures in Santiago, Cape Verde
