= 2010 Cape Verdean Cup =

2010 Cape Verdean Cup Taça Nacional de Cabo Verde
Tournament details
- Dates: 11/12 May–13 June
- Teams: 11

Final positions
- Champions: Boavista Praia
- Runner-up: Botafogo FC

The 2010 Cape Verdean Cup (Taça Nacional de Cabo Verde de 2010) season was the 4th competition of the regional football cup in Cape Verde. The season started on 20 July and finished with the cup final on 2 August. The cup competition was organized by the Cape Verdean Football Federation (Federação Caboverdiana de Futebol, FCF). Boavista Praia won their last of two cup titles. A month later, they would also win a championship title, currently the only club to win both a cup and a championship title.

A total of 11 clubs participated. 11 played in the first round, five played in the second round, Solpontense started from that round and played its only match where they lost to Botafogo. The final round had three matches played at Estádio da Várzea, the winner were decided on goal totals. Boavista won with a total of 8 goals, runner-up was Botafogo with two goals and third was Sal Rei with nothing as the third match were not held, only two out of three matches were played.

No cup competitions took place in 2011, the next one would be in 2012.

== Participating clubs ==
- Sport Sal Rei Club, winner of the Boa Vista Island Cup
- SC Morabeza, winner of the Brava Island Cup
- Botafogo FC, winner of the Fogo Island Cup
- Barreirense FC, winner of the Maio Island Cup
- Juventude Sal, winner of the Sal Island Cup
- Boavista Praia, winner of the Santiago South Cup
- Solpontense FC, winner of the Santo Antão North Cup
- Marítimo Porto Novo - winner of the Porto Novo Cup (or Santo Antão South Cup)
- FC Talho, winner of the São Nicolau Cup
- Batuque FC, winner of the São Vicente Cup

== First round ==
10 clubs took part.. Solpontense directly advanced into the Second Round as that club had no opponent to challenge.

== Second round ==
Six clubs took part

== Final round ==
Only the first two of three matches were played, the third one was not held. Participants in the national championships indicated in I.

Team 1	Score	Team 2
Boavista Praia (SS, I)	6–0	Sport Sal Rei Club (BV)
Boavista Praia (SS, I)	3–2	Botafogo FC (FG, I))

Cape Verdean Cup 2010
Winners
Boavista Praia
2nd title

== See also ==
- 2009–10 in Cape Verdean football
- 2010 Cape Verdean Football Championships
