= 2013 Cape Verdean Football Championships =

Cape Verdean Football Championship
- Season: 2013
- Champions: CS Mindelense
- Matches played: 36
- Goals scored: 77 (2.14 per match)
- Biggest home win: Mindelense
- Biggest away win: Desportivo Praia (two matches)
- Highest scoring: Dukinha (6)

The 2013 Cape Verdean Football Championship season was the 34th of the competition of the first-tier football in Cape Verde. Its started on 11 May and finished on 13 July, slightly earlier than last year. The tournament was organized by the Cape Verdean Football Federation. CS Mindelense won the ninth title. They did not participate in the 2014 CAF Champions League. In 2014, Mindelense would become the second and most recent club to win both the cup and the super cup title in the same season.

== Overview ==
Sporting Praia was the defending team of the title. A total of 12 clubs participated in the competition, one from each island league and one who won the last season's title. More than three clubs shared the same club name starting with Académic- numbering four out of twelve, one less than last season. Half of Group B clubs would bear the first club name but only half would bear the name in the knockout stage.

The biggest win was Mindelense who scored 4-0 over Ultramarina, other matches that finished with four goals who scored by Desportivo Praia (1-4 over Ultramarina), Solpontense and Académico 83 with four and Desportivo Praia (1-4 over Juventude da Furna).

The season would have one of fewest goals in history after the expansion of the clubs to over ten. Week one had only one victory of each of six matches, five games were tied, one being one and the remaining zero and made it the worst of any soccer week in Cape Verdean football (soccer) history. Week two had no points higher than two scored, the remaining three weeks were better, week four had only one and four points of each of the four matches while two games were finished without a single goal.

== Participating clubs ==

Participating football (soccer) clubs of the 2013 Cape Verdean Football Championships (Cape Verde)
- Sporting Clube da Praia, winner of the 2012 Cape Verdean Football Championships
- Onze Estrelas, winner of the Boa Vista Island League
- Juventude da Furna, winner of the Brava Island League
- Académica do Fogo, winner of the Fogo Island League
- Académico 83, winner of the Maio Island League
- Académico do Aeroporto, winner of the Sal Island League
- Solpontense FC, winner of the Santo Antão Island League (North)
- Académica do Porto Novo, winner of the Santo Antão Island League (South)
- FC Ultramarina, winner of the São Nicolau Island League
- CS Mindelense, winner of the São Vicente Island League
- Scorpions Vermelho, winner of the Santiago Island League (North)
- Desportivo da Praia, runner-up of the Santiago Island League (South)

=== Information about the clubs ===
| Club | Location | Venue | Stadium |
|---|---|---|---|
| Académica do Fogo | São Filipe | 5 de Julho | 1,000 |
| Académica do Porto Novo | Porto Novo | Porto Novo | 8,000 |
| Académico 83 | Vila do Maio | Maio | 4,000 |
| Académico do Aeroporto | Espargos | Marcelo Leitão | 8,000 |
| Desportivo da Praia | Praia | Várzea | 12,000 |
| Juventude da Furna | Vila Nova Sintra | Aquiles d'Oliveira | 500 |
| Mindelense | Mindelo | Adérito Sena | 8,000 |
| Onze Estrelas | Sal Rei | Arsénio Ramos | 500 |
| Scorpion Vermelho | Santa Cruz | 25 de Julho | 1,000 |
| Solpontense FC | Ponta do Sol | João Serra | 2,000 |
| SC Praia | Praia | Várzea | 12,000 |
| FC Ultramarina | Tarrafal de São Nicolau | Orlando Rodrigues | 1,000 |

== League standings ==
=== Group A ===
| Pos | Team | Pld | W | D | L | GF | GA | GD | Pts |
|---|---|---|---|---|---|---|---|---|---|
| 1 | Desportivo da Praia | 5 | 4 | 1 | 0 | 12 | 2 | +10 | 13 |
| 2 | CS Mindelense | 5 | 3 | 1 | 1 | 9 | 4 | +5 | 10 |
| 3 | Académico do Aeroporto | 5 | 2 | 3 | 0 | 3 | 1 | +2 | 9 |
| 4 | FC Ultramarina | 5 | 1 | 1 | 3 | 5 | 12 | -7 | 4 |
| 5 | Onze Estrelas | 5 | 0 | 2 | 3 | 4 | 9 | -5 | 2 |
| 6 | Juventude da Furna | 5 | 0 | 2 | 4 | 4 | 8 | -5 | 2 |

=== Group B ===
| Pos | Team | Pld | W | D | L | GF | GA | GD | Pts |
|---|---|---|---|---|---|---|---|---|---|
| 1 | Académica do Fogo | 5 | 3 | 2 | 0 | 4 | 0 | +4 | 11 |
| 2 | Académica do Porto Novo | 5 | 3 | 1 | 1 | 15 | 1 | +4 | 10 |
| 3 | Sporting Clube da Praia | 5 | 2 | 3 | 0 | 6 | 3 | +3 | 9 |
| 4 | Solpontense FC | 5 | 1 | 3 | 1 | 6 | 6 | 0 | 6 |
| 5 | Academico 83 | 5 | 0 | 2 | 3 | 5 | 11 | -6 | 2 |
| 6 | Scorpions Vermelho | 5 | 0 | 1 | 4 | 1 | 6 | -5 | 1 |

== Results ==
Week 1
| Home | Score | Visitor | Date |
|---|---|---|---|
| Académico do Sal | 0 - 0 | Onze Estrelas | 11 May |
| CS Mindelense | 0 - 2 | Desportivo Praia | 11 May |
| FC Ultramarina | 1 - 1 | Juventude da Furna | 12 May |
| Académico 83 | 0 - 0 | Scorpion | 11 May |
| Sporting da Praia | 0 - 0 | Académica do Porto Novo | 11 May |
| Académica do Fogo | 0 - 0 | Solpotense FC | 11 May |

Week 2
| Home | Score | Visitor | Date |
|---|---|---|---|
| Académico do Sal | 1 - 0 | FC Ultramarina | 18 May |
| Desportivo da Praia | 2 - 0 | Onze Estrelas | 18 May |
| Juventude da Furna | 0 - 1 | CS Mindelense | 19 May |
| Académica do Porto Novo | 0 - 1 | Académica do Fogo | 18 May |
| Académico 83 | 1 - 2 | Sporting da Praia | 18 May |
| Solpotense FC | 1 - 0 | Scorpion | 19 May |

Week 3
| Home | Score | Visitor | Date |
|---|---|---|---|
| Onze Estrelas | 1 - 3 | CS Mindelense | 25 May |
| Juventude da Furna | 0 - 1 | Académico do Sal | 26 May |
| FC Ultramarina | 1 - 4 | Desportivo da Praia | 26 May |
| Scorpion | 0 - 1 | Académica do Fogo | 25 May |
| Sporting da Praia | 1 - 1 | Solpotense FC | 25 May |
| Académica do Porto Novo | 3 - 0 | Académica 83 | 26 May |

Week 4
| Home | Score | Visitor | Date |
|---|---|---|---|
| Onze Estrelas | 1 - 1 | Juventude da Furna | 1 June |
| CS Mindelense | 4 - 0 | FC Ultramarina | 1 June |
| Desportivo Praia | 0 - 0 | Académico do Sal | 1 June |
| Solpotense FC | 4 - 4 | Académico 83 | 1 June |
| Académica do Fogo | 0 - 0 | Sporting da Praia | 1 June |
| Scorpion | 0 - 1 | Académica do Porto Novo | 1 June |

Week 5
| Home | Score | Visitor | Date |
|---|---|---|---|
| Académico do Sal | 1 - 1 | CS Mindelense | 9 June |
| FC Ultramarino | 3 - 2 | Onze Estrelas | 9 June |
| Juventude da Furna | 1 - 4 | Desportivo da Praia | 9 June |
| Sporting da Praia | 3 - 1 | Scorpion | 9 June |
| Académica do Porto Novo | 1 - 0 | Solpotense FC | 9 June |
| Académico 83 | 0 - 2 | Académica do Fogo | 9 June |

== Final Stages ==
| Semi-Finals | | | | Finals |
| CS Mindelense | 1 | 1 | 2 |
| Académica do Fogo | 1 | 0 | 1 | CS Mindelense | 3 | 2 | 5 |
| Académica do Porto Novo | 3 | 0 | 3 | Académica do Porto Novo | 0 | 2 | 2 |
| Desportivo da Praia | 1 | 0 | 1 |

=== Semi-finals ===
22 June 2013

| Académica do Porto Novo | 3-0 | Desportivo da Praia |
|---|---|---|
| Nicha; Nelsa; Ivinha |

Estádio Municipal do Porto Novo
Porto Novo
22 June 2013
16:00

| CS Mindelense | 1:1 | Académica do Fogo |
|---|---|---|
| Dukinha 27' | | Quinzinho 77' |

Estádio Municipal Adérito Sena
Mindelo
29 June 2013

| Desportivo da Praia | 1:0 | Académica do Porto Novo |

Estádio da Várzea
Praia
29 June 2013
15:30

| Académica do Fogo | 0:1 | CS Mindelense |
|---|---|---|
| | | Dany Kwué 46' |

Estádio 5 de Julho
São Filipe

=== Finals ===
7 July 2013

| CS Mindelense | 3:0 | Académica do Porto Novo |
|---|---|---|
| Adyr 6' 65'; Dukinha 40' |

Estádio Municipal Adérito Sena
Mindelo
Referee: Antônio Rodrigues
13 July 2013

| Académica do Porto Novo | 2:2 | CS Mindelense |
|---|---|---|
| Oceano 32'; Flávio 87' | | Dukinha 36' 78' |

Estádio Municipal do Porto Novo
Porto Novo
Referee: Manuel Timas

Cape Verdean Football 2013
Champions
CS Mindelense
9th title

== Statistics ==
- Topscorer: Dukinha: 6 goals (of CS Mindelense)
- Biggest win: CS Mindelense 4-0 FC Ultramarina (June 1)

== See also ==
- 2012–13 in Cape Verdean football
