= 2014 Cape Verdean Football Championships =

Cape Verdean Football Championship
- Season: 2014
- Champions: CS Mindelense
- Matches played: 36
- Goals scored: 73 (2.03 per match)
- Biggest home win: Academica do Porto Novo
- Biggest away win: Académica da Calheta, Académica do Fogo
- Highest scoring: Sy (5)

The 2014 Cape Verdean Football Championship season was the 35th of the competition of the first-tier football in Cape Verde. Its started on 5 April and finished on 31 May, earlier than the previous year as some days later, television viewers would later tune to the 2014 World Cup which took place in Brazil. The tournament was organized by the Cape Verdean Football Federation. CS Mindelense won the tenth title and their second in a row, its total number of titles superseded Sporting Praia's totals by one. They did not participate in the 2015 CAF Champions League.

== Overview ==
CS Mindelense was the team defending the title. A total of 12 clubs participated in the competition, one from each island league and one who won the last season's title. Again more than three clubs shared the same club name starting with Académica numbering four out of twelve. Once again, half of Group B clubs would bear the first club name but only half would bear the name in the knockout stage.

SC Verdun of Pedra de Lume made their next national appearance in 34 years and first also featuring a group stage. Grémio Nhágar was the only participant of the north of Santiago that came from the municipality of Santa Catarina and Assomada.

The biggest win was Académico do Porto Novo who scored 5-0 over Sporting Clube from Brava. Mindelense scored the most matches at home numbering seven and was a record at the national championships.

The season would have the fewest goals in history after the expansion of the clubs to over ten, fewer than last season. Unlike last season, only two matches had nil points. Week 2 had the lowest scoring. Some matches finished 1-0 or 0-1.

== Participating clubs ==

Participating football (soccer) clubs of the 2014 Cape Verdean Football Championships (Cape Verde)
- CS Mindelense, winner of the 2013 Cape Verdean Football Championships
- Académica Operária, winner of the Boa Vista Island League
- Sporting (Brava), winner of the Brava Island League
- Académica do Fogo, winner of the Fogo Island League
- Académica da Calheta, winner of the Maio Island League
- Sport Clube Verdun, winner of the Sal Island League
- Grémio Nhágar, winner of the Santiago Island League (North)
- Sporting Clube da Praia, winner of the Santiago Island League (South)
- Paulense Desportivo Clube, winner of the Santo Antão Island League (North)
- Académica do Porto Novo, winner of the Santo Antão Island League (South)
- SC Atlético, winner of the São Nicolau Island League
- FC Derby, winner of the São Vicente Island League

=== Information about the clubs ===
Club	Location	Venue	Capacity
Académica da Calheta	Vila do Maio	Maio	4,000
Académica do Fogo	São Filipe	5 de Julho	1,000
Académica Operária	Sal Rei	Arsénio Ramos	500
Académica do Porto Novo	Porto Novo	Porto Novo	8,000
SC Atlético	Ribeira Brava	João de Deus Lopes da Silva	1,000
FC Derby	Mindelo	Adérito Sena	8,000
Grémio Nhágar	Assomada	Cúmbem	4,000
Mindelense	Mindelo	Adérito Sena	8,000
Paulense Desportivo Clube	Paúl	João Serra	2,000
Sporting (Brava)	Vila Nova Sintra	Aquiles de Oliveira	500
SC Praia	Praia	Várzea	12,000
Sport Clube Verdun	Espargos	Marcelo Leitão	8,000

Italics indicates a team playing in a stadium in a different town or city.

== League standings ==
=== Group A ===
Pos	Team	Pld	W	D	L	GF	GA	GD	Pts
1	Sporting Clube da Praia	5	4	1	0	7	1	+6	13
2	Académica do Porto Novo	5	2	2	1	7	2	+5	8
3	Grémio Nhágar	5	2	2	1	6	5	+1	8
4	Paulense Desportivo Clube	5	1	1	3	4	6	-2	4
5	FC Derby	5	1	1	3	4	6	-2	4
6	Sporting Clube da Brava	5	0	2	3	3	12	-9	2

=== Group B ===
Pos	Team	Pld	W	D	L	GF	GA	GD	Pts
1	CS Mindelense	5	4	0	1	9	2	+7	12
2	Académica do Fogo	5	3	2	0	10	4	+6	11
3	SC Atlético	5	2	1	2	3	3	0	7
4	Académica da Calheta	5	2	0	3	5	8	-3	6
5	Académica Operária	5	2	0	3	3	9	-6	6
6	Sport Clube Verdun	5	0	1	4	3	7	-4	1

== Results ==
The group and calendar was sorted on February 15 in Praia by the Cape Verdean Football Federation.

Week 1
Home	Score	Visitor	Date
Académica PN	0 - 0	Sporting Praia	6 April
FC Derby	1 - 1	Grémio Nhágar	6 April
Sporting Brava	1 - 1	Paulense	6 April
CS Mindelense	4 - 0	Acádemica Operária	5 April
SC Atlético	1 - 0	Académica da Calheta	6 April
Verdun	2 - 2	Académica do Fogo	5 April

Week 2
Home	Score	Visitor	Date	Time
Académica PN	2 - 1	FC Derby	13 April	16:00
Grémio Nhágar	1 - 1	Sporting Brava	12 April	16:00
Paulense	0 - 1	Sporting Praia	12 April	16:00
CS Mindelense	1 - 0	SC Atlético	12 April	15:30
Académica da Calheta	2 - 1	Verdun	12 April	15:30
Académica do Fogo	2 - 0	Acádemica Operária	12 April	15:30

Week 3
Home	Score	Visitor	Date
Grémio Nhágar	1 - 0	Académica PN	19 April
FC Derby	0 - 1	Paulense	19 April
Sporting Praia	3 - 0	Sporting Brava	19 April
Académica da Calheta	0 - 2	CS Mindelense	19 April
SC Atlético	1 - 1	Académica do Fogo	19 April
Acádemica Operária	1 - 0	Verdun	19 April

Week 4
Home	Score	Visitor	Date	Time
Sporting Praia	2 - 1	Grémio Nhágar	26 April	16:00
Sporting Brava	1 - 2	FC Derby	27 April	16:00
Paulense	0 - 0	Académica PN	26 April	16:00
Acádemica Operária	1 - 3	Académica da Calheta	26 April	15:30
Verdun	0 - 1	SC Atlético	26 April	15:30
Académica do Fogo	2 - 1	CS Mindelense	26 April	15:30

Week 5
Home	Score	Visitor	Date
Académica PN	5 - 0	Sporting Brava	4 May
Grémio Nhágar	2 - 1	Paulense	4 May
FC Derby	0 - 1	Sporting Praia	4 May
CS Mindelense	1 - 0	Verdun	3 May
Académica da Calheta	0 - 3	Académica do Fogo	3 May
SC Atlético	0 - 1	Acádemica Operária	3 May

== Final Stages ==
All times are in Cape Verdean Time (UTC−1)

Semi-Finals				Finals
Sporting Clube da Praia	0	2	2
Académica do Fogo	0	2	2	Académica do Fogo	1	0	1
CS Mindelense	0	3	3	CS Mindelense	2	0	2
Académica do Porto Novo	0	0	0

=== Semi-finals ===
10 May 2014
15:30

Académica do Porto Novo	0:0	CS Mindelense

Estádio Municipal do Porto Novo
Porto Novo
Referee: Manuel Timas Mendes
10 May 2014
15:30

Académica do Fogo	0:0	Sporting Clube da Praia

Estádio 5 de Julho
São Filipe
Referee: Victor Lima
17 May 2014
15:30

CS Mindelense	3:0	Académica do Porto Novo
Nhambu 31'; Catchupa 63' 72'

Estádio Municipal Adérito Sena
Mindelo
Referee: Jaime Noel Figueiredo
17 May 2014
15:30

Sporting Clube da Praia	2:2	Académica do Fogo
Ró 23' 51'		Sy 16'; Cláudio 81'

Estádio da Várzea
Praia
Referee: Alberto Monteiro

=== Finals ===
24 May 2014
15:30

CS Mindelense	2:1	Académica do Fogo
Patchico 7'; Sidney 81'		Victor 29'

Estádio Municipal Adérito Sena
Mindelo
Referee: Aristides Rodrigues
31 May 2014
15:30

Académica do Fogo	0:0	CS Mindelense

Estádio 5 de Julho
São Filipe
Referee: Antonio Rodrigues

Cape Verdean Football 2014
Champions
CS Mindelense
10th title

== Statistics ==
- Top scorer: Sy: 5 goals (of Académica do Fogo)
- Biggest win: Académica PN 5-0 Sporting Brava (4 May)

== See also ==
- 2013–14 in Cape Verdean football
- 2014 Cape Verdean Super Cup
