= 2015 Cape Verdean Football Championships =

Cape Verdean Football Championship
- Season: 2015
- Champions: CS Mindelense
- Runner up: FC Derby
- Matches: 36
- Goals: 103 (2.86 per match)
- Top goalscorer: (Cape Verde) Matxona (6)
- Biggest home win: Mindelense
- Biggest away win: FC Derby, Académico do Aeroporto

The 2015 Cape Verdean Football Championship season was the 36th beginner level competition of the first-tier football in Cape Verde. Its started on 9 May and finished on 11 July. The tournament was organized by the Cape Verdean Football Federation. The schedule including its matches were created on Saturday January 10. CS Mindelense won the eleventh title and became the second club after Sporting Praia to win three in a row. Neither clubs participated in the CAF Champions League competition in 2016 and in the 2016 CAF Confederation Cup. This was the second ever and most recent finals competition that two clubs came from the same island as well as the same city.

CS Mindelense was the defending team of the title. A total of 12 clubs participated in the competition, one from each island league and one who won the last season's title.

The biggest win was Mindelense who scored 6-0 over Sporting Clube from Brava. In Group A, only one club scored more than ten goals while four clubs in Group B scored more than ten, the top two scored 14 each and the 3rd and 4th place clubs scored 12 each. Mindelense became the third and recent club to win all five matches in a six club group stage, Derby also done theirs for the second and most recent time.ĵ

The finals had two of its matches ended in a draw with a goal each, this was the first time that happened. The winner was decided on penalty kicks and Mindelense won 4-3 on penalty kicks, this was the first that ended in a penalty shootout in 21 years, the next occurred in the following season.

== Participating clubs ==

Participating football (soccer) clubs of the 2015 Cape Verdean Football Championships (Cape Verde)
- CS Mindelense, winner of the 2014 Cape Verdean Football Championships
- Académica Operária, winner of the Boa Vista Island League
- Sporting (Brava), winner of the Brava Island League
- Spartak d'Aguadinha, winner of the Fogo Island League
- Académico 83, winner of the Maio Island League
- Académico do Aeroporto, winner of the Sal Island League
- Beira Mar, winner of the Santiago Island League (North)
- FC Boavista, winner of the Santiago Island League (South)
- Paulense Desportivo Clube, winner of the Santo Antão Island League (North)
- Académica do Porto Novo, winner of the Santo Antão Island League (South)
- FC Ultramarina, winner of the São Nicolau Island League
- FC Derby, runner up of the São Vicente Island League

=== Information about the clubs ===
Club	Location	Venue	Capacity
Académico 83	Vila do Maio	Maio	4,000
Académica Operária	Sal Rei	Arsénio Ramos	500
Académica do Porto Novo	Porto Novo	Porto Novo	8,000
Académico do Aeroporto	Espargos	Marcelo Leitão	8,000
Beira-Mar	Tarrafal	Mangue	
FC Boavista	Praia	Várzea	12,000
FC Derby	Mindelo	Adérito Sena	8,000
Mindelense	Mindelo	Adérito Sena	8,000
Paulense Desportivo Clube	Paúl	João Serra	2,000
Spartak d'Aguadinha	São Filipe	5 de Julho	1,000
Sporting (Brava)	Vila Nova Sintra	Aquiles d'Oliveira	500
FC Ultramarina	Tarrafal de São Nicolau	Orlando Rodrígues	5,000

Italics indicates a team playing in a stadium in a different town or city.

== League standings ==
=== Group A ===
Pos	Team	Pld	W	D	L	GF	GA	GD	Pts
1	FC Derby	5	5	0	0	12	2	+10	15
2	Paulense Desportivo Clube	5	3	1	1	6	3	+3	10
3	Académica do Porto Novo	5	2	1	2	5	5	0	7
4	Académico 83	5	2	0	3	5	9	-4	6
5	Spartak	5	1	0	4	5	9	-4	3
6	Académica Operária	5	0	2	3	2	7	-5	2

=== Group B ===
Pos	Team	Pld	W	D	L	GF	GA	GD	Pts
1	CS Mindelense	5	5	0	0	14	1	+13	15
2	Boavista FC	5	4	0	1	14	4	+10	12
3	Académico do Aeroporto	5	3	0	2	12	9	+3	9
4	FC Ultramarina	5	2	0	3	12	16	-4	6
5	Sporting Clube da Brava	5	0	1	4	5	16	-11	1
6	Beira-Mar	5	0	1	4	3	14	-11	1

== Results ==
Week 1
Home	Score	Visitor	Date
Académica Operária	1 - 1	Paulense	9 May
Spartak	1 - 4	Derby	9 May
Académica Porto Novo	1 - 0	Académica 83	10 May
Beira-Mar	0 - 2	Boavista	9 May
Mindelense	3 - 0	Ultramarina	9 May
Académico Aeroporto	2 - 1	Sporting Brava	3 June

Week 2
Home	Score	Visitor	Date
Académica Operária	0 - 2	Spartak	17 May
Derby	2 - 1	Académica Porto Novo	16 May
Académica 83	1 - 3	Paulense	16 May
Beira-Mar	0 - 2	Mindelense	16 May
Ultramarina	2 - 3	Académico Aeroporto	17 May
Sporting Brava	0 - 3	Boavista	17 May

Week 3
Home	Score	Visitor	Date	Time
Derby	1 - 0	Académica Operária	24 May	15:30
Spartak	1 - 2	Académica 83	24 May	15:30
Paulense	1 - 0	Académica Porto Novo	23 May	15:30
Ultramarina	5 - 2	Beira-Mar	24 May	15:30
Mindelense	6 - 0	Sporting Brava	23 May	15:30
Boavista	4 - 2	Académico Aeroporto	23 May	15:30

Week 4
Home	Score	Visitor	Date
Paulense	0 - 1	Derby	31 May
Académica Porto Novo	2 - 1	Spartak	30 May
Académica 83	2 - 0	Académica Operária	30 May
Boavista	5 - 1	Ultramarina	30 May
Académico Aeroporto	1 - 2	Mindelense	31 May
Sporting Brava	1 - 1	Beira-Mar	31 May

Week 5
Home	Score	Visitor	Date
Académica Operária	1 - 1	Académica Porto Novo	7 June
Derby	4 - 0	Académica 83	7 June
Spartak	0 - 1	Paulense	7 June
Beira-Mar	0 - 4	Académico Aeroporto	6 June
Ultramarina	4 - 3	Sporting Brava	7 June
Mindelense	1 - 0	Boavista	6 June

== Final Stages ==
Semi-Finals				Finals
FC Derby	1	2	3
FC Boavista	2	1	3	FC Derby	1	1	2
CS Mindelense	0	2	2	CS Mindelense	1	1	2
Paulense DC	1	0	1

=== Semi-finals ===
20 June 2015

Boavista	2:1	FC Derby
Givalter 62' 88'		Kévy 80'

Estádio da Várzea
Praia
Referee: Jaime Figueiredo
20 June 2015

Paulense DC	1:0	CS Mindelense
Oceano 44'

Estádio João Serra
Ponta do Sol
28 June 2015
15:30

FC Derby	2:1	FC Boavista
Bena 40' 71'		Michel 50'
Penalties
	Derby won

Estádio Municipal Adérito Sena
Mindelo
Referee: António Rodrigues
27 June 2015
15:30

CS Mindelense	2:0 (a.e.t.)	Paulense DC
Gauço 21'; Chibaca 111'

Estádio Municipal Adérito Sena
Referee: Alberto Monteiro

=== Finals ===
4 July 2015
16:00

CS Mindelense	1:1	FC Derby
Latche		Quatro

Estádio Municipal Adérito Sena
Mindelo
Referee: Lenine Rocha
11 July 2015

FC Derby	1:1	CS Mindelense
Duque 90+5'		Xibaka 37'
Penalties
	3-4

Estádio Municipal Adérito Sena
Mindelo

Cape Verdean Football 2015
Champions
CS Mindelense
11th title

== Statistics ==
- Top scorer: Matxona: 6 goals (of FC Boavista)
- Least-beaten goalkeeper: Vozinha (of CS Mindelense)
- Greatest player: Oceano (of Paulense)
- Greatest trainer: Alberto Leite (of CS Mindelense)
- Fair Play Award: Académico do Aeroporto
- Highest scoring match: Mindelense 6-0 Sporting Brava (May 23)

== See also ==
- 2014–15 in Cape Verdean football
