= GD Varandinha =

Varandinha
- Full name: Grupo Desportivo Varandinha
- Founded: 23 September 1994
- Ground: Estádio de Mangue; Tarrafal on Santiago Island, Cape Verde
- Manager: Badau
- League: Santiago Island League (North); Cape Verdean Football Championships
- 2015–16 2016: Champion; Semi-finalist
Home colours	Away colours

Grupo Desportivo Varandinha (also in the Capeverdean Crioulos of ALUPEC or ALUPEK and São Vicente Crioulo) is an association football club that plays in the Santiago Island League North Zone in Cape Verde. The team is based in the town of Tarrafal in the northern part of the island of Santiago in Cape Verde. Since the implementation of the two tier regional system in 2015, Varandinha are one of ten unrelegated clubs of northern Santiago. Its current head coach is Badau.

Along with Tarrafal's Beira-Mar and Santa Cruz's Scorpion Vermelho, it is considered being the most popular club of the North Zone.

== Logo ==
Its logo colors features the front gate with peach-tanned citadel and wooden gates. Inside the logo has the club name in a red tag, on top of the gate are the first two acronyms G and D. The shield rim is orange, outside below has a blue tag reading the foundation date. Inside the shield, on top is a blue balcony railing with white poles inside, on top is the golden crown and on top is white with the city's main geographic feature Monte Graciosa as seen from the middle of the city.

== Uniform ==
Home uniform up to 2014

Its uniform colors is a red t-shirt with four orange edges on each side covering 2/3 of the shirt size and the rest of the clothing white for home matches. The color for away or alternate matches is orange clothing.

Up to 2014, its uniform colors were red and black for home games.

== History ==
The club was founded on 23 September 1994. Varandinha celebrated its 10th anniversary of its foundation in 2004.

Prior to 2006, the team was playing in the second-level competition. It entered into the level and became the Northcentral (Centro Norte) group. today they were playing in the newly formed Group B. The team won their only regional title for the record breaking 2015–16 season, their points achieved was a regional record and had 61 points and 20 wins, even in goal scoring with 45, unbeatable in other islands as South Santo Antão's Académica do Porto Novo, Sporting Brava, Sporting Praia (in 2005, 2006 and 2016), and several clubs of Fogo, the highest being Spartak d'Aguadinha has its own goal scoring records higher than Varandinha's. Second point total of any of the island league is 61 points got by Scorpion Vermelho also in 2016. In the highest points of each season of any of the island leagues, it was once held by Sporting Praia of the Santiago South Zone until 2016 with 49 points made in 2005. Varandinha's 63 points remain unbeatable, Sporting's third total became 52 on 9 April, that club lost one and finished with 55 points, that was the third total until 22 March 2018 as Académica da Praia is now at 56 points and has one more match to go.

In May 2016, a championship declaration dispute arose between Scorpion Vermelho and Varandinha as in a match as on an 3 April match (19th round) featuring Desportivo Santa Cruz and Scorpion Vermelho that Desportivo fielded an ineligible player, it occurred after the goals were scored and the award to Scorpion Vermelho in mid-May was revoked just before the start of the national season and the 2–0 result was kept and Varandinha's participation was kept. As a result, the first round match featuring Desportivo Praia Varandinha and Derby was rescheduled from 13 May to 1 June and Varandinha won 1–3, it was also the last meeting with two clubs from two parts of the island.

For the first time, the club entered the national championships for the first time where the club advanced up to the semi-finals, they played in Group A and was second after FC Derby, the club lost a total of six goals to Mindelense, Varandinha scored the most goals in Group A with nine and they were second overall to Mindelense with eleven.

Along with other clubs in the municipality, Varandinha appeared at the 2016 GAFT Cup in October, the first edition and featured only one meeting each with four matches, the club won their only title after finished with 10 points, the point total was shared with Estrela dos Amadores but Varandinha scored more goals than that club.

Varandinha had another stint for their planned second straight title as they were defenders, they had a two-goal draw on 17 December, the first match of the season with Beira-Mar in the Tarrafal derby, Varandinha started 4th. Varandinha won the 2nd round match defeating União Picos and their positions climbed to 4th. Varandina lost the 3rd round match to AJAC, the club who later became champions. A two match winning streak was followed. On 25 January, Varandinha lost to Benfica Santa Cruz along with their chance for another title and their national participation. In the middle of the 2016–17 season, they were 5th, their positions slowly dwindled to 8th at the 16th round after a loss to Calheta de São Miguel. On 13 April, Varandinha suffered another loss to Benfica which was their last of the season, at the 21st round they were 7th, Varandinha finished 5th after they defeated CD Scorpion Vermelho 5–0. Along with Calheta de São Miguel and Grêmio Nhágar, they had 38 goals scored and had 9 wins, 6 draws and 7 losses shared with two other clubs of the city, Estrela dos Amadores and Beira-Mar.

Varandina started the 2017–18 season with the first two matches ended in draws before their season's first win was made on 2 December over Scorpion Vermelho. Varandinha lost the first of two planned city's derby matches to Beira Mar with the result 1–2. Varandina recently scored 3–1 over another club of the city Estrela dos Amadoes and their positions risen from the middle to third place at the 9th round, Varandina has 10 goals scored in total, shared with Benfica Santa Cruz. On 25 February, Varandinha made three straight goal draws and their positions remained sixth with 16 points. Varandinha made two more wins and their position risen to fifth and has 22 points sharing São Lourenço's, also they had 17 goals scored. Varandina made a win over Flor Jovem and gained to third position, slowly increased their chance for a possible title. Varandinha's further successes were stalled with two additional draws and with one round to go, what is now gone, their second regional title. In goal scoring, they scored 21 now sharing with Nhagar as fourth in the region. Varandinha's final challenge will be with AJAC.

== Rivalry ==
The club's rivalry is Beira-Mar and makes up of the Tarrafal Derby which is also Santiago North's prominent derby, it was once the only derby. It is considered the newest rivalry in Cape Verde.

== Honours ==
- Santiago North Premier Division
  - Champions (1): 2015–16
- GAFT Cup
  - Winners (1): 2016

== League and cup history ==
=== National championship ===
Season	Div.	Pos.	Pl.	W	D	L	GS	GA	GD	P	Notes	Playoffs
2016	1A	1	5	3	1	1	9	4	+5	10	Advanced into the finals	Semi-finalist

=== Island/Regional Championship ===
Season	Div.	Pos.	Pl.	W	D	L	GS	GA	GD	P	Cup	GAFT Cup	Notes
2014–15	2	3	12	6	5	1	16	7	+9	23			Advanced into the final phase
2014–15	2	2	6	2	2	2	9	7	-2	8			2nd place
2015–16	2	1	26	20	3	3	45	17	+28	63		Winner	Promoted into the National Championships
2016–17	2	5	22	9	6	7	38	32	+6	33	Not Held	Quarter-finals	

== Statistics ==
- Best position: 4th (national)
- Appearances at the championships:
  - National: Once, in 2016
  - Regional: 16
- Total matches played: 7 (national)
- Highest number of matches played: 26 (regional), 33 (regional and national)
- Highest number of goals in a season:
  - National: 9 (regular season), 10 (with playoffs)
  - Regional: 47
- Highest number of points in a season:
  - National: 10
  - Regional: 63 – a record of any of the island leagues made in 2016
