= CD Scorpion Vermelho =

Football club in Cape Verde

Scorpion Vermelho
- Full name: Clube Desportivo Scorpions Vermelho (de Santa Cruz)
- Founded: 2003
- Ground: Estádio Municipal 25 de Julho, Santa Cruz on Santiago Island, Cape Verde
- Capacity: 1,000
- League: Santiago North Premier Division
- 2016–17: 8th

Clube Desportivo Scorpions Vermelho de Santa Cruz is a football club that plays in the Santiago Island League North Zone of the Grupo Centro Sul in Cape Verde. The team is based in the town of Santa Cruz in the southeastern part of the island of Santiago and plays at Estádio Municipal 25 de Julho west of town. Since the implementation of the two-tier regional system in 2015, Scorpion Vermelho are one of the ten unrelegated clubs of northern Santiago.

Along with Tarrafal's Beira-Mar and Varandinha, it is considered the most popular club of the North Zone. It may became the North Zone's top five clubs in 2016.

== History ==
The club was founded in 2003, the club was formed in the late 1990s. It is named after a red scorpion as there is on the island, the Cape Verde red scorpion (Hottentotta caboverdensis) which is the island's and the country's only endemic scorpion and listed in the list of endangered species. The first club of the name is not the Portuguese name for scorpion which is escorpião, it is the English name, the last name is Portuguese for red. Its English name is not known as the Red Scorpions, especially translingual, but Scorpion Vermelho. The Capeverdean Creole of ALUPEC is called Scorpion Bermedju and not Skorpion Bermedju.

=== Regional competitions ===
The club was registered in 2006 and participated their first season in 2007. In April 2007, the team won their first zonal (now regional) title in the team's history, they won their second straight in 2008. The club would play in the first and second phases for some seasons. Later, two more titles were won in 2010 and 2013.

Before winning three more championship titles, Scorpion Vermelho also won a cup title for 2007 and later won their only super cup title later in the year. In 2012, they won their last regional cup title.

Scorpion Vermelho celebrated its 10th anniversary of the club's foundation in 2013.

In May 2016, a championship declaration dispute arose between Scorpion Vermelho and Varandinha as in a match as on an April 3 match (19th round) featuring Desportivo Santa Cruz and Scorpion Vermelho that Desportivo fielded an ineligible player, it occurred after the goals were scored and the award to Scorpion Vermelho in mid-May was revoked just before the start of the national season and the 2–0 result was kept and Scorpion Vermelho's second-place position was kept, it delayed the first round national match which Varandinha played.

Nonetheless, Scorpion Vermelho got their best season ever for the records with the extended 2015–16 season, they finished with 18 wins, 7 draws, scored 57 goals and had 61 points, all were club records. Regionally it is ahead of Benfica de Santa Cruz's 46 and AJAC de Calheta's 45 made in 2017, until 2016, third in the region was Desportivo de Santa Cruz. Overall in goal scoring of any regional leagues in the country, it is a goal ahead of Brava's Juventude da Furna but behind South Santo Antão's Académica do Porto Novo, Sporting Brava, and several clubs of Fogo, the highest being Spartak d'Aguadinha has its own goal scoring records higher than Varandinha's. In the highest points of each season of any of the island leagues, it was once held by Sporting Praia of the Santiago South Zone until 2016 with 49 points, Scorpion Vermelho would have the nation's second highest of any of the regional championships behind Varandinha and ahead of Sporting with a total of 55, from 2017 Boavista Praia with 51, on March 22, 2018, it is now ahead of Académica da Praia currently at 56. Scorpion Vermelho's second total of any regional competitions is kept at 61.

Scorpion Vermelho started off the 2016–17 season last place after a 0–4 loss to Estrela dos Amadores, Scorpion defeated Juventus 0–3 and became 6th. On December 29, a two-goal draw with Grêmio Nhágar was followed but dropped its positions to 8th. They did not picked up a position until they defeated Flor Jovem 3–2 on January 29 and then 6th after they defeated Desportivo Santa Cruz, originally for February 12, it was rescheduled to the 25th as the referees needed money for some rounds especially of the season. Scorpion Vermelho had a few scoreless draws later, though they defeated Estrelas dos Amadores at the 12th round and again picked a position to 5th, after they made a victory over Benfica Santa Cruz on March 25 and was 4th place, their highest reached. Their positions plummeted slowly, 5th after a loss to Beira Mar, in between was the club's last won as they defeated AJAC 4–3 on April 13, later they were 6th at the 20th round after a loss to Calheta de São Miguel, the first of three straight losses, they the last two to Desportivo de Santa Cruz and Tarrafal's Varandinha and Scorpion Vermelho finished 8th with 30 points, 8 wins, 7 draws and losses and scored 30 goals.

Scorpion Vermelho started off the 2017–18 season with a goal draw with Flor Jovem, their season's first won was on November 25 as they defeated Benfica. Two straight wins came after their loss to Varandinha on December 2. A single goal draw was made with GDR São Lourenço and is now second place at the sixth round. They had 4 wins with their recent with the score 4–1 over Tarrafal's Beira Mar, their recent was over Flor Jovem on February 17. Two straight draws, a scoreless one with Benfica Santa Cruz and a goal apiece with Varandinha at the 12th round. The club is now first place with 20 points, shared with Flor Jovem and had 14 goals, a seven difference over their 8 conceded. They were still first with 24 points and had 6 wins sharing with four other clubs including the top four clubs, their last win was over AJAC on March 3 in Calheta. A round later, they defeated São Lourenço 0–5 and gained a greater chance for another regional title, they had 27 points, this gained with their win over Estrela dos Amadores and they got it after their win over ailing Calheta and heads for the fifth time at the nationals. The final match of the season will be against Tarrafal's Beira Mar.

=== National competition ===
Scorpion Vermelho entered the Capeverdean National Division for the first time in history and participated in Group B. It was the second club from the municipality and their second participation. Their first match was a win over Santo Antão North's Rosariense 1–0, their second straight win and their last was made over Sporting Clube do Porto Novo of the south of the same island and another result of 2–0. The club's next three matches ended in losses, the match with Vulcânicos was the club's last goal scored for the season and the last two that conceded a goal, the club finished fifth. Later Scorpion Vermelho made their only appearance at the 2007 Cape Verdean Cup and was unsuccessful for the club. Scorpion Vermelho participated again in 2008 and was placed in Group B, no wins would be made, on May 10, the club lost to São Vicente's FC Derby 4–1 and became the worst match ever for the club. The first of two draws were made, no goal were scored in the match with AD Bairro (or ADESBA) who was runner up of the south of the island's Premier Division. The match against Académica da Calheta do Maio was cancelled and officially ended in a draw without goals awarded to the clubs. Scorpion Vermelho finished last for the season.

Their next two participations were all in Group B, Scorpion Vermelho came back for the 2010 season and made the club's greatest success. One exception was their first match lost to Académico do Aeroporto do Sal 3–1 at the first round. The club made two straight wins first over Sporting Boa Vista then Maio's Barreirense, the last match was the club's last win at the nationals. The last two matches ended in a loss first to Ribeira Brava from São Nicolau then to Sporting Praia from down south. One part of the success was they scored 7 goals, the highest ever for the club and finished 3rd failing to qualify into the knockout stage. Their position was their greatest at the national championships. Three years later, they made their last appearance in the 2013 national championships, they made almost no success that season. Their first match of the season was a scoreless draw with Maio's Académico 83. The remaining four matches were losses, the last match of the season saw their last goal scored for the club in a match with Sporting Praia from down south, it ended in a 3–1 loss.

At the nationals, they have 15 points, a number equalling to their goals, 4 wins and draws, they also played 20 matches.

== Logo and uniform ==
Its logo features the crest with the green ribbon reading the club name with the top left colored white and features a scorpion and the bottom right colored blue and features a boat.

== Honours ==
- Santiago North Island Championships/Premier Division
  - Champions (5): 2006–07, 2007–08, 2009–10, 2012–13, 2017–18
- Santiago North Cup
  - Winners (3): 2006–07, 2011–12, 2013
- Santiago North Super Cup
  - Winners (1): 2006–07

== League and cup history ==
=== National championship ===
Season	Div.	Pos.	Pl.	W	D	L	GS	GA	GD	P	Cup	Notes	Playoffs
2007	1B	5	5	2	0	3	5	5	0	6		Did not advance	Did not participate
2008	1B	5	5	0	2	3	2	8	-6	2		Did not advance	Did not participate
2010	1B	3	5	2	0	3	7	8	-1	6		Did not advance	Did not participate
2013	1B	6	5	0	1	4	1	6	-5	1	Not held	Did not advance	Did not participate
Total:			20	4	3	13	15	27	-12	15			

=== Island/Regional Championship ===
Season	Div.	Pos.	Pl.	W	D	L	GS	GA	GD	P	Cup	Notes
2006–07	2	1	-	-	-	-	-	-	-	-	Winner	Promoted into the National Championships
2007–08	2	1	-	-	-	-	-	-	-	-		Promoted into the National Championships
2009–10	2	1	-	-	-	-	-	-	-	-		Promoted into the National Championships
2012–13	2	1	-	-	-	-	-	-	-	-	Not held	Promoted into the National Championships
2014–15	2	6	12	5	3	4	13	9	+4	18	Not held	Did not advance into the final phase
2015–16	2	2	26	18	7	1	57	13	+44	61	Not held	
2016–17	2	8	22	8	7	7	30	31	-1	31	Not held	

== Statistics ==
- Best position: 3rd, Group B (Regular Season, National)
- Appearances at the championships:
  - National: 5
  - Regional: 10
- Total matches played: 19 (national)
  - Total matches played at home: 9
  - Total matches played away: 10
- Total points: 15 (national)
- Total wins: 4 (national)
  - Total wins at home: 3
  - Total wins away: 1
- Total draws: 3 (national)
  - Total draws at home: 1
  - Total draws away: 1 and 1 awarded
- Total goals scored: 15 (national)
- Best season: 2016 (18 wins, 7 draws, 57 goals, 61 points)
- Highest number of goals scored in a season:
  - National: 7 (national), in 2010
  - Regional: 57, in 2016 – club record
- Highest number of points in a season:
  - National: 6, in 2007 and 2010
  - Regional: 61, in 2016 – club record
- Highest number of wins in a season: 18 (regional) – club record
- Highest number of draws in a season: 2 (national), in 2008
- Highest scoring match at the National Championships: three matches with two goals:

Sporting Porto Novo 0–2 Scorpion Vermelho, 19 May 2007
Scorpion Vermelho 2–0 Sporting Boavista, 15 May 2010
Scorpion Vermelho 2–1 Barreirense, 22 May 2010

- Lowest number of goals scored in a season: 5 (national), in 2007
- Lowest number of points in a season: 1 (national), in 2013
- Highest number of goals conceded in a season: 8 (national), in 2008 and 2010
- Highest number of matches lost in a season: 4 (national), 2015
- Total losses: 14 (national)
- Total goals conceded: 27 (national)
- Worst defeat: Derby 4–1 Scorpion Vermelho, 10 May 2008
