= CF Estrela dos Amadores =

Football club in Cape Verde

Estrela dos Amadores
- Full name: Clube de Futebol Estrelas dos Amadores; Clube de Futebol Estrelas do Amadores do Tarrafal
- Founded: 1992
- Ground: Estádio de Mangue; Tarrafal on Santiago Island, Cape Verde
- League: Santiago North Premier Division
- 2016–17: 6th

Clube de Futebol Estrela dos Amadores (Capeverdean Crioulo, ALUPEC or ALUPEK: Strela dus Amadoris and the São Vicente Crioulo: Estrela dos Amadores) is a football (soccer) club that plays in the Santiago Island League North Zone in Cape Verde. The team is based in the town of Tarrafal in the northern part of the island of Santiago and are one of the oldest clubs in the area. Since the implementation of the two tier regional system in 2015, Estrela dos Amadores are one of ten unrelegated clubs of the North Zone of Santiago.

== History ==
The club was founded in 1992 and became registered in 1998. The team won three regional titles in 2004, in 2009 and in 2012 and possessing the second most titles in the region since 2009, from 2012 to 2013, its titles were shared with Scorpion Vermelho of Pedra Badejo.

Estrela dos Amadores celebrated its 5th anniversary in 1997 and later its 10th anniversary in 2002.

=== The club's successful years ===
Estrela dos Amadores was the second club from the North Zone to compete at the nationals in 2004 and was unsuccessful as they finished last in Group A, no wins and draws were made, the club conceded 15 goals, their worst was a 4–0 loss to Sal Rei in the first round. The only goal was scored in a match with Académica do Mindelo where they lost 1–3. Their next appearance was five years later in 2009 and was placed in Group B, it was the club's most successful season as they made two wins shared with SC Morabeza from Brava and Vulcânicos. On May 24, the second round, they made their first win for the club defeating Sporting Porto Novo 3–2 at home, their second win was also in Tarrafal as they defeated Sal Rei's Académica Operária 3–1 at the 4th round, also it was their season's last goal scored. Estrela dos Amadores finished 5th, the only difference the other two was three losses and had six points. Three years later, Estrela dos Amadores made their recent national appearance (the 2012 season) and once more in Group B, their success was the same as their last, their first match was a loss to Batuque from São Vicente. Their first of two draws were made with Académica do Fogo on 12 May. Estrela dos Amadores later lost to Juventude do Sal. The club made their greatest match at the nationals on May 27 as they defeated Brava's Académica 5–0 and was the club's last national win. Their final match at the nationals was their second and final draw with the mighty Sporting Praia from down south of the island.

=== Recent history ===
Estrela dos Amadores started the 2014–15 season 6th with a draw with São Lourenço then a scoreless one with Varandinha and dropped to 7th. A loss to Scorpion Vermelho put down their position to 11th. A win over Calheta placed the club 6th, then a loss to AJAC on February 22 placed the club 8th. A win over Real Júnior put the club 7th and was the club's last win of the season. A loss to Flor Jovem put the club 8th and where they finished with 14 points, 3 wins, 5 draws and 12 goals scored and did not advance into the second phase along with the other nine.

Estrela dos Amadores finished fourth for the 2015–16 season, some of the numbers were new club records including 12 draws and 39 points.

Along with other clubs in the municipality, Estrela dos Amadores appeared at the 2016 GAFT Cup in October, the first edition, second place is what the club finished, it shared the same points with Varandinha numbering 10 but scored fewer goals.

Estrela dos Amadores competed with other Tarrafal clubs for their chance to win another regional title as they started first in the first round of the 2016–17 season, a loss to Varandinha pushed their position to 3rd, the club went to a three match winning streak and after a 10th round win over Juventus Assomada got back their first place and held it for two more weeks as they would lose to Scorpion Vermelho at the 21st round. Two draws followed, first a goal each with Beira-Mar, then a scoreless one with União Picos, their position dropped to third. At the 16th round, they made the season's final win as they defeated Flor Jovem 3–0, two more draws were followed, the same as the previous but with Calheta de São Miguel and Santa Cruz, at the same time, they lost their chance for another regional title and the club was 4th at the 20th round, on May 7, the final match of the season and the Premier Division was a loss to Grêmio Nhágar with the score 4–3 and the club finished 6th with 36 goals which were shared with Varandinha, also shared were 33 points, 9 wins, 6 draws and 7 losses also shared by Beira Mar, the only difference was the club conceded 23 goals second least in the region behind Benfica de Santa Cruz and ahead of AJAC.

Later in the year (2017), Estrela dos Amadores celebrated its 25th year of its foundation.

Estrela dos Amadores started the 2017–18 Premier Division with a 1–0 win over the previous season's champion AJAC, a two-goal draw with Beira Mar was followed. Estrela dos Amadores had the same goals with Flor Jovem, 12, third in the region, they were fifth place with 3 wins and 2 draws. On January 20, Estrelas dos Amadores made a 1–0 win over Desportivo da Calheta and shared the points with Beira Mar and Grémio Nhagar, they had 13 goals scored. A goal draw with AJAC was next followed by a win over Beira Mar and then a loss to Grémio Nhagar. The club was fifth and had 18 points, also they had 5 wins shared with Scorpion Vermelho, Flor Jovem, São Lourenço and Grémio Nhagar. At round 14, they suffered their third straight loss and was seventh, and has the same wins with Varandinha, a round later, they also had the same wins with Flor Jovem and São Lourenço but had 21 points. The club recently defeated Benfica Santa Cruz before a sufferable loss to Scorpion Vermelho. Estrela dos Amadores played at home field with Varandinha and ended in a two-goal draw, the club is seventh, and has 20 goals sharing Flor Jovem and AJAC.

== Logo and uniform ==
The club's logo and uniform are based on the Portuguese football club Estrela da Amadora, though the name of the Tarrafal club are plural. Even they have changed the logo today. Also Tarrafal is twinned with the Portuguese city Amadora. Estrelas dos Amadores is the only affiliate to Estrela da Amadora in the whole of Africa.

== Honours ==
- Santiago Island League (North): 3

2003/04, 2008–09, 2011/12

== League and cup history ==
=== National championship ===
Season	Div.	Pos.	Pl.	W	D	L	GS	GA	GD	P	Notes	Playoffs
2004	1A	6	5	0	0	5	1	15	-14	0	Did not advance	Did not participate
2009	1B	5	5	2	0	3	7	8	-1	6	Did not advance	Did not participate
2012	1A	5	5	1	2	2	8	7	+1	5	Did not advance	Did not participate
Total:			15	3	2	10	16	30	-14	11		

=== Island/Regional Championship ===
Season	Div.	Pos.	Pl.	W	D	L	GS	GA	GD	P	Cup	Notes
2003–04	2	1	-	-	-	-	-	-	-	-		Promoted into the National Championships
2008–09	2	1	-	-	-	-	-	-	-	-		Promoted into the National Championships
2011–12	2	1	-	-	-	-	-	-	-	-		Promoted into the National Championships
2014–15	2	8	12	3	5	4	12	13	-1	14		Did not advance into the final phase
2015–16	2	4	26	9	12	5	34	22	+12	39		
2016–17	2	6	22	9	6	7	36	23	+13	33	Not held	

== Statistics ==
- Best position: 5th – Group Stage (national)
- Appearances at the championships:
  - National: 3
  - Regional: 16:
- Total matches played: 15 (national)
  - Total matches played at home: 8
  - Total matches played away: 7
- Total points: 11 (national)
- Total wins: 3 (national), all of them at home
- Total goals scored: 16 (national)
- Total draws: 2 (national), all of them away
- Highest number of goals scored in a season: 8 (national), in 2012
- Highest number of points in a season:
  - National: 6, in 2012
  - Regional: 39, in 2016
- Highest number of wins in a season: 2 (national), in 2009
- Highest number of draws in a season: 12 (regional), in 2016
- Highest number of matches played in a season: 26 (regional), in 2016
- Highest scoring match at the National Championships: Estrela dos Amadores 5–0 Académica da Brava, 27 May 2012

Other:

- Appearance at the GAFT Cup: 2
- Lowest number of goals scored in a season: 1 (national), in 2004
- Lowest number of points in a season: none (national), in 2004
- Highest number of goals conceded in a season: 15 (national), in 2004
- Highest number of matches lost in a season: 5 (national), in 2004
- Total losses: 10 (national)
- Total goals conceded: 30 (national)
- Worst defeat at the National Championships: Sal Rei 4–0 Estrela dos Amadores, 8 May 2004

== Players ==
- Patas, played in 2010
- (Cape Verde) Tom Tavares
