= CD Flor Jovem da Calheta =

Football club in Cape Verde

Flor Jovem
- Full name: Clube Desportivo Flor Jovem da Calheta
- Ground: Estádio da Calheta, Calheta de São Miguel on Santiago Island, Cape Verde
- League: Santiago North Premier Division
- 2016–17: 10th

Clube Desportivo Flor Jovem da Calheta (Portuguese meaning young flower, Capeverdean Crioulo, ALUPEC or ALUPEK: Flor Juven also in the São Vicente Crioulo) is an association football club that plays in the Santiago Island League North Zone in Cape Verde. The team is based in the town of Calheta de São Miguel in the eastern part of the island of Santiago and its stadium is in the northwest of town named Estádio da Calheta. Since the implementation of the two tier regional system in 2015, the club are one of ten unrelegated clubs of northern Santiago.

== About the club ==
The club name is Portuguese for young flower whereas the club were mainly founded by youngsters and young flowers grown around Calheta.

The team only won a regional title in 2005 and participated once in the Cape Verdean football championships. In the national season, no win was made but a draw, the club's first match was against Académica do Sal and lost 1–2 on May 14, then they lost to Sport Sal Rei Club of Boa Vista and Académica do Fogo where they made their worst defeat at the nationals with the score 6–1. Their last match was a goal draw with São Nicolau's Desportivo Ribeira Brava. As the club did a poor performance, Flor Jovem withdrew and the final match of the season which was on June 18 with Paulense, champion of Santo Antão North was cancelled. Flor Jovem da Calheta was thought to become another participant from the municipality into the national championships, as AJAC fielded an ineligible player, it was later kept as the only participant from the municipality at the nationals, a decision by the national federation chose AJAC to be champions of the Premier Division of the North Zone and is now listed as the first of the two from the municipality.

Recently, the club appeared in the 2014–15 season and were first in the first phase with 31 points and had 10 wins. At the second phase, Flor Jovem finished third with 7 points and had two wins. A total of 18 goals were scored. In the 2015–16 season restructured with the round system used for the North Zone for the first time and became the Premier Division, the club did nearly poorly and finished 9th and had 33 points, 8 wins, 9 draws and losses, they scored more which numbered 37. In the 2017 season, Flor Jovem da Calheta again finished 9th, this time with lower numbers with 21 points, 6 wins, 3 draws and scored 22 goals and conceded 39.

Flor Jovem started the 2017–18 season with a goal draw with Scorpion Vermelho, Flor Jovem had a three match winning streak with their last over Estrela dos Amadores, they also took the number one spot from São Lourenço at the fourth round and had 10 points. Two more draws, each with a goal was followed and had 12 points at the sixth round. Flor Jovem now has 16 points and was still the first, they also the club scored 12 goals in total, third in the Premier Division shared with Estrela dos Amadores at round 8. The battle to keep the number one spot began and lost to second place Scorpion Vermelho on February 17 and its position. Flor Jovem made another win over Calheta on February 21. Flor Jovem is currently second behind Scorpion Vermelho they had 20 points, shared with Flor Jovem along with five draws and shares its 5 wins with Flor Jovem, São Lourenço and Estrela dos Amadores, they scored 17 goals, the difference was four less to the goals they conceded. Flor Jovem had 23 points with their last win on March 3 over Estrelas dos Amadores in Tarrafal. Their wins were shared with four other clubs, the point total was the same as Grémio Nhagar. Flor Jovem suffered another loss, this one to Varandinha from Tarrafal and was fourth. Flor Jovem later made a goal draw with AJAC, for Flor Jovem, there went all of their chances for another title. Flor Jovem suffered a loss to Grémio Nhagar and dropped to fifth place. They scored 20 goals in total, sharing with Estrela dos Amadores and AJAC. The final match was a 5–2 victory over São Lourenco and finished fifth with 27 points.

== Logo ==
Its logo had two green flowers on each side with a football (soccer) ball inside the top of the flower and the club name on the top and bottom. The logo was used until the end of the 2016–17 season.

== Honours ==
- Santiago Island League (North): 1

2004/05

== League and cup history ==
=== National championship ===
Season	Div.	Pos.	Pl.	W	D	L	GS	GA	GD	P	Cup	Notes	Playoffs
2005	1A	6	4	0	1	3	4	12	-8	1		Did not advance	Did not participate
Total:			4	0	1	3	4	12	-8	1			

=== Island/Regional Championship ===
Season	Div.	Pos.	Pl.	W	D	L	GS	GA	GD	P	Cup	Notes
2004–05	2	1	-	-	-	-	-	-	-	-		Promoted into the National Championships
2014–15	2	1	12	10	1	1	14	3	+11	31		Advanced into the final phase
2014–15	2	3	6	2	1	3	4	7	-3	7		3rd place
2015–16	2	9	26	8	9	9	37	43	-6	33		
2016–17	2	9	22	6	3	13	22	39	-17	21		

== Statistics ==
- Best position: 6th (national)
- Total goals scored: 4 (national)
- Total point: 1 (national)
- Highest number of goals conceded in a season: 43 (regional), 2016
- Highest number of draws in a season: 9 (national), in 2016
- Highest number of matches lost in a season: 13 (regional), 2017
