= SC Beira-Mar (Tarrafal) =

Beira-Mar
- Full name: Sport Clube Beira-Mar do Tarrafal
- Founded: 7 December 1985
- Ground: Estadio de Mangue, Tarrafal, Santiago Island, Cape Verde
- Capacity: 8,000
- Chairman: António Furtado
- Manager: Hipólito
- League: Santiago North Premier Division
- 2016–17: 7th
Home colours	Away colours

Sport Clube Beira-Mar do Tarrafal is an association football club that plays in the Santiago Island North League in Cape Verde. It is based in the village of Chão Bom nearly 2 km south of Tarrafal in the northernmost part of the island of Santiago and plays in the Estádio de Mangue. Since the implementation of the two tier regional system in 2015, Beira-Mar is one of ten unrelegated clubs of the north of the island Santiago.

Along with Varandinha and Santa Cruz's Scorpion Vermelho, it is considered being the most popular club of the north of the island.

== History ==
The club is registered as the oldest in the municipality of Tarrafal, it was formed by the union of several sporting groups Voz de de África, Astros and Moscal. The name of the club name after the beauty of crystal waters of the bay. The club celebrated its 29th anniversary on 7 December 2014.

Beira Mar finished 4th in the first phase and qualified into the second phase later the club won their only title in 2015 after finished first place and also appeared in the national competition for the first and only time. The club never had any wins though they had a draw, also they scored only three goals and finished with a point in the national competition.

Beira-Mar had a successful season for the club in 2016, some of these were new club records including 11 wins, 52 goals scored and 38 points. The point total, once fourth in the South Zone, now it became seventh behind Estrela dos Amadores and Grémio Nhágar's 38 and ahead of Desportivo da Calheta's 37 points.

Along with other clubs in the municipality, Beira Mar appeared at the 2016 GAFT Cup in October, the first edition.

Beira Mar was ready for another stint on winning their second regional title in the 2016–17 season, their chance was still held as they had a two goal draw with Varandinha in the Tarrafal derby in the first match of the season and was placed 7th. At the 2nd round, they lost to another club of the city Estrela dos Amadores and was placed 8th. Their first win of the season was the last match of 2016 as they defeated Juventus Assomada 1–5 which was the highest scoring match of the region up to late April. A two match winning streak was made with Grêmio Nhágar and their positions rose to fourth. A goal draw with Scorpion Vermelho was made and was placed 6th. Beira-Mar lost to Benfica Santa Cruz was followed on 21 January but lost a position. Beira-Mar went between 8th and 7th from the 8th to the 17th rounds, at the first part, they lost everything in having a chance to win another regional title. Beira Mar made a victory over ailing União Picos at the 18th round match on 12 April with the score 1–0 and was 6th place for a round as a loss to AJAC placed the club 7th for the rest of the season with the exception of the 21st round where they lost 6–3 to Calheta de São Miguel. The final match of the season was a 1–0 win over Desportivo de Santa Cruz. Beira-Mar finished with 33 points and had 9 wins, 6 draws and 7 wins shared with other Tarrafal clubs of Varandinha and Estrela dos Amadores. Beira Mar scored 36 goals together with Estrela dos Amadores, the only difference was Beira Mar conceded 36 goals, 13 more than that club.

Beira-Mar started off the 2017–18 Premier Division with a 2–0 win over Calheta. Beira-Mar was fifth at the fifth round, their recent win were a 1–2 win over their rival Varandinha and AJAC. Beira-Mar was third with 10 points, shared with Grémio Nhagar as well as 3 wins and a draw, Beira Mar had 10 goals, three more than that club. At the start of 2018, Beira Mar defeated Grémio Nhagar in Assomada 1–4 and became second placed position with 13 points, a scoreless draw with São Lourenço made it 14 points at the 8th round and had 14 goals scored, second in the region behind São Lourenço. Beira-Mar lost a position to Scorpion as they lost 4–1 to that club on 21 January in Pedra Badejo and was third place, shared the points with Estrelas do Amadores but still with Grémio Nhagar. Their positions slipped as they suffered two more losses before a goal draw with Flor Jovem was made on 21 February. Beira Mar was 7th with 15 points, also shared with Benfica Santa Cruz along with 4 wins and 3 draws, Beira Mar had 16 goals scored. Beira Mar now suffered three more losses and dropped to 8th, they had 18 goals scored sharing with Flor Jovem and Grémio Nhagar at the 15th round and at the 16th round, they have the same wins as to AJAC which Beira-Mar recently lost to, Beira Mar now had 19 goals alongside Benfica Santa Cruz. Beira Mar made a win over Grémio Nhagar on 17 March, then a loss to São Lourenço was made, with one round to go, incredibly left from the relegation zone, their last match will be first placed Scorpion Vermelho. Beira Mar has the third most goals in the region numbering 22.

== Rivalry ==
The club's rivalry is GD Varandinha and makes up of the Tarrafal Derby which is also Santiago North's most prominent derby, it was also the only one. It is considered the newest rivalry in Cape Verde.

== Logo and uniform ==
Its logo is coloured in gold and features an eagle carrying the crest, the crest features the anchor and BM (meaning Beira-Mar) in the middle. The logo is nearly the same (the letters and the yellow colour) but it has a shield and not a seal and a golden eagle instead of a brown one. The club is an affiliate of Portugal's S.C. Beira-Mar based in Aveiro. Its uniform is nearly the same as the Portuguese club but slightly different. Other club affiliated to Beira Mar in the nation is on Maio Island. The club in Ribeira Grande on the island of Santo Antão is not affiliated to the Aveiro club.

== Honours ==
- Santiago Island League (North): 1

2014/15

== League and cup history ==
=== National championship ===
Season	Div.	Pos.	Pl.	W	D	L	GS	GA	GD	P	Cup	Notes	Playoffs
2015	1B	6	5	0	1	4	3	14	-11	1		Promoted into playoffs	Semifinalist
Total:			5	0	1	4	3	14	-11	1			

=== Island/Regional Championship ===
Season	Div.	Pos.	Pl.	W	D	L	GS	GA	GD	P	Notes
2014–15	2	4	12	6	3	3	17	14	+3	21	Advanced into the final phase
2014–15	2	1	6	4	0	2	11	4	+7	12	Champion
2015–16	2	5	26	11	5	10	52	41	+11	38	
2016–17	2	7	22	9	6	7	36	36	0	33	

== Statistics ==
- Appearances at the championships:
  - National: Once, in 2015
  - Regional: 16
- Best position: 6th – Group B (national)
- Total goals scored: 3 (national)
- Total draw: 1 (national)
- Total point: 1 (national)
- Highest number of matches played in a season: 26 (regional)
- Highest number of wins in a season: 12 (regional), in 2016
- Highest number of goals scored in a season: 52 (regional), in 2016
- Highest number of points in a season: 38 (regional), in 2016
- Highest number of goals conceded in a season: 41 (regional), in 2016

Other:

- Appearance at the GAFT Cup: 2

== Other sports ==
Other sports include athletics, basketball, volleyball and boxing. Basketball, volleyball and boxing are played at Tarrafal's sports arena east of the football field.
