= GD Benfica de Santa Cruz =

Association football club in Cape Verde

Benfica de Santa Cruz
- Full name: Grupo Desportivo Benfica de Santa Cruz; Grupo Desportivo Benfica
- Founded: November 25, 2005; 19 years ago
- Ground: Estádio Municipal 25 de Julho, Pedra Badejo, Santiago Island, Cape Verde
- Capacity: 8,000
- League: Santiago Island League (South)
- 2015–16: 10th

Grupo Desportivo Benfica de Santa Cruz, sometimes as Grupo Desportivo Benfica, is a professional football club that plays in the Santiago Island North League in Cape Verde. It is based in the town of Calheta de São Miguel in the island of Santiago and plays at Estádio Municipal 25 de Julho located northwest of the city center. Since the implementation of the two tier regional system in 2015, the club are one of ten unrelegated clubs of northern Santiago.

The club is an affiliate to Portugal's S.L. Benfica of Lisbon. It is the only one affiliated to in the North Zone and one of the three on the island. The others are Praia's CD Travadores and Benfica FC da Praia.

== History ==
The club was founded on 25 November 2005 and first competed in the regional competitions in the late 2000s.

In 2011, they got their greatest position of first place of the final phase and won the North Zone's regional championships and qualified into the Nationals. Their first national level challenge was from the south of the island, Sporting Clube da Praia and lost 1–0 on 15 May. Benfica Santa Cruz defeated Sal Rei and later São Nicolau's FC Ultramarina. On 4 June, a goal draw was made with Fogo's Vulcânicos and the final match was also a draw with CS Mindelense from São Vicente, neither goals were scored, their final position was that the club did not head to the playoffs, third place with 8 points, 2 wins and 4 goals scored. From 2012 to 2014, the seasons would not be successful for the club.

In recent history, in 2015, the club finished 7th in the first phase and had 15 points, 3 wins and scored 11 goals. Another aim for the success came for Benfica in the 2015–16 season, the first ever as the Premier Division, their extended season doubled the matches than the previous season and failed to reach the tops as they finished 10th with 29 points and had 8 wins and scored 33 goals, just above the division decisional match qualification zone, a fifty-fifty chance of staying or being relegated.

In the 2016–17 season, the second season as the Premier Division, the club started 4th, then down to 7th after a draw with Grémio Nhágar and a loss to Desportivo Santa Cruz but steadily came back to third on 25 January after defeating the previous champion GD Varandinha 2–1 on 25 January. Benfica headed for another successful season and reached 2nd, dropped to third after a loss to Estrela dos Amadores at home at the 9th round, regained it after a win over AJAC de Calheta and reached 1st place at the 12th round, after a win over Flor Jovem, later their statistics reached record level, never before for Benfica. Their last place position eroded on 25 March as they lost to Scorpion Vermelho of the same municipality 0–1. Benfica headed on a four match winning streak, after a win over Tarrafal's Beira-Mar regained the first position for the remainder of the season, their last win of the season was a victory over União Picos and kicked that club out of the Premier Division in the following season. The winning streak ended as they made a goal draw with Tarrafal's Estrela dos Amadores, then their 5 match unbeaten streak ended after the final loss of the season was made to AJAC who was attempted to make their fake championship but did not. At the same time, Benfica Santa Cruz and some other clubs protested AJAC's round 16 win over Juventus Assomada where AJAC fielded a suspended player that had two yellow cards, named Marco Aurélio, AJAC did not and that president defended it along with other clubs. The final match of the season was a two-goal draw with Juventus Assomada and the final result went to uncertainty. On 11 May, the Judicial Council of the North Zone said that Benfica de Santa Cruz were crowned Premier Division champions of the North Zone and would have got their next regional title in six years. It was overturned and AJAC became champions and Benfica was placed second.

Their win totals equalled to AJAC at the 2016–17 season.

Benfica started the 2017–18 season with the first two matches ended in losses, Benfica underwent a two match winning streak on 9 December with only a goal scored in each matches, Benfica underwent two more straight draws on 22 December. Benfica's first match of 2018 was a loss, they made their only win of the year on 13 January as they defeated AJAC 2–1, the club was 6th place with 11 points, also shared with Estrela dos Amadores and Grémio Nhagar, they scored a total of 10 goals, fifth in Santiago North alongside Varandinha. They were eighth as they lost to Grémio Nhagar on 20 January. Benfica made no further successes as they had two straight losses, until 25 February as they made three more wins, first, over last placed Calheta and was 8th with 15 points, their points shared with Beira Mar and had 13 goals. Then Beira-Mar and Flor Jovem and became sixth with 21 points, they have 6 wins, sharing with other clubs that were in the top four positions. Benfica lost to Estrelas dos Amadores, their wins shared with that club as well as Varandinha at round 16. Benfica was seventh, 16 goals scored, two less than Estrela dos Amadores. A goal draw with Tarrafal's Varandinha came, then a win over AJAC and gained two positions to fifth place with 25 points, its points sharing with São Lourenço and has 19 goals, ninth least in the region with seven more than Calhetas's.

=== Record statistics ===
Their record of 46 points has become a club record and become one of the highest in the North Zone and any of the regional championships, it equals to the South Zone's Sporting made in 2006 and Praia's Boavista's and Desportivo's in 2016, also both of the South Zone. It is behind Sporting Praia's totals of 2012 (47 points, also shared with Fogo's Académica) and 2013 (48 points) alongside others with 48 points including Vulcânicos and ahead of its 45 points in 2010 made by Sporting, Académica Praia's in 2004 and recently in 2017 and Vulcânicos of Fogo in 2004 and 2017.

=== Other competitions ===
Alongside AJAC, Benfica de Santa Cruz were the first two participants of the north of the island outside the municipality of Tarrafal to appear in the second GAFT Cup, the club reached the finals and played with Desportivo da Praia from Santiago South on 28 October and no goals were scored up to extra time which entered into the penalty shootout, the club scored 4–3 and won their only GAFT title.

== Logo and uniform ==
Its logo is colored red and white, nearly the same as S.L. Benfica.

Its logo is with a white crest (not fully circular) with a golden bird above, a green-red ribbon, as S.L. Benfica reads "E pluribus unum", Benfica Santa Cruz reads its club name, not the full name but as Benfica Santa Cruz. It has a red and white shield with a ball and a blue ribbon with the club name acronym in the middle. Other logos in the nation are the same (with some similarity) are Praia's CD Travadores, Benfica da Praia (Benfiquinha), Paulense, Sport Sal Rei Club, Ribeira Brava's SC Atlético, Nô Pintcha dos Mosteiros and Benfica of Brava.

== Honours ==
- Santiago Island League (North): 1

2011

- Santiago North Cup: 1

2010

- Other competitions:
  - GAFT Cup: 1

2017

== League and cup history ==
=== National championship ===
Season	Div.	Pos.	Pl.	W	D	L	GS	GA	GD	P	Cup	Notes	Playoffs
2011	1A	3	5	2	1	2	5	4	+1	8		Did not advance	Did not participate

=== Island/Regional Championship ===
Season	Div.	Pos.	Pl.	W	D	L	GS	GA	GD	P	Notes
2010–11	2	1	-	-	-	-	-	-	-		Promoted into the National Championships
2014–15	2–1	7	12	3	6	3	11	10	+11	15	Did not advance
2015–16	2	10	25	8	5	12	33	30	+3	29	
2016–17	2	2	22	14	4	4	33	16	+17	46	

== Statistics ==
- Best position: 3rd (national)
- Highest number of matches played in a season: 26 (regional), in 2016
- Highest number of wins in a season: 14 (regional), in 2017
- Highest number of goals scored in a season: 33 (regional), in 2017
- Highest number of points in a season: 46 (regional), in 2017

Other:

- Appearance at the GAFT Cup: Once, in 2017
