= AJAC de Calheta =

AJAC AJAC da Calheta
- Full name: Associação Juvenil Amigos de Calheta
- Ground: Estádio da Calheta, Calheta de São Miguel, Santiago Island, Cape Verde
- Capacity: 1,000
- Manager: Amarildo Semedo
- League: Santiago North Premier Division
- 2016–17: Champion
Home colours	Away colours

AJAC or AJAX, full name Associação Juvenil Amigos de Calheta (or da Calheta), also as Associação Juvenil Amigos de Calheta de São Miguel (Capeverdean Creole, ALUPEK: AJAK) is a football (soccer) club that plays in the Santiago Island North League in Cape Verde. It is based in the town of Calheta de São Miguel in the island of Santiago and plays at Estádio da Calheta located north of town center. Since the implementation of the two tier regional system in 2015, AJAC is one of ten unrelegated clubs of the North Zone of Santiago.

The club is the only in Cape Verde that is affiliated to a Dutch club, it is an affiliate of Ajax Amsterdam. Its logo is the same as Ajax Amsterdam's, a thick red circle and the names AJAX on the top left. Not in Africa as another affiliate is in Cape Town, South Africa, it is Ajax Cape Town.

== History ==
The club was founded by young children and friends.

The club first competed in the regional competitions in the 1990s.

In recent history, the club was at moderate positions, they finished 11th and had 10 points with 12 wins and scored 52 goals. Their records were getting bigger with an extended 2015–16 season, they finished with 37 points and was 7th and had 10 wins and 52 goals were scored. In that position, they were around moderate, they started fourth, headed to third at the 7th round and remained for six rounds, later they were fifth and headed to seventh.

=== A record season, a minimal flaw, and dispute ===
The 2016–17 season was shortened and kept much of its success going, the club started third, then second at the second round, first place at the third round and took first position at the 8th round for two weeks and put the club to fourth, their lowest position, they came back third, then second at the 14th round, then first position at the 15th round for two weeks, then lost it, at the 19th round, they were climbing back. On March 11, the club lost to Desportivo da Calheta 4–0 and became one of three worst defeats of the Premier Division that season. At the final round on May 6, the club defeated Flor Jovem 5–0 and finished first place. The club finished with 15 wins, had 3 draws, 48 goals were scored and got 48 points, one of these became club record. On May 11, the regional association deducted three points from the club and became 14 wins, 44 goals and 45 points, a point below Benfica de Santa Cruz, AJAC later took back its three points. Nonetheless, AJAC scored the most goals in the Premier Division. AJAC thought they did the wrong thing when the club fielded a suspended player Marco Aurélio in a match with Juventus Assomada on April 1, Marco Aurélio who had three yellow cards, AJAC actually did not. The original result was kept 2–4, the association awarded Juventus 3–0 but was later revoked. Benfica de Santa Cruz protested AJAC's appearance. AJAC were original champions of the season, later Benfica Santa Cruz became champions. AJAC was thought to be kicked out of Group A at the 2017 championships as the judicial council barred AJAC for a few days and attempted to take Benfica Santa Cruz into the national championship. The declaration was made and it became unofficial, AJAC had officially been relegated and would compete in the Second Division in the following season, almost all of it, for being a false champion. New regulations are being made as the crowning of a champion at all sports with a narrow point difference is to be made two weeks or a month after the end of the season. Also as done in other nations, suspended players are not allowed to attend their matches.

Amarildo, the chairman did not like that decision, they did not fielded a suspended played or made him score some goals. Other probable opponents of this were Juventus Assomada, Beira-Mar Tarrafal, Estrela dos Amadores? and Varandinha. After putting that to the federal level, In Praia, the Capeverdean Football Federation (FCF) officially declared AJAC regional champions on May 17 and qualifies into the national competition as the suspended player in a 16th round match was not fielded and scored not a single goal that match. AJAC won their only regional title and finished with 48 points. AJAC's point record is third in the North Zone behind Scorpion Vermelho's 61 and Varandinha's 63 last season and ahead of Benfica Santa Cruz's 45. AJAC stays in the Premier Division in the following season alongside Benfica Santa Cruz while Juventus Assomada was officially relegated as they finished 11th, inside the relegation zone. Of that, this is the second time after Scorpion Vermelho-Varandinha which occurred in 2016, the previous season in the same region and also being the only in the country where a championship dispute occurred twice in a regional Premier Division or championship.

=== Into the National Championships ===
AJAC played its first ever national championship match on May 20 with Ultramarina from Tarrafal de São Nicolau. At the fourth round on June 4, they made their only win over Vulcânicos on the island of Fogo. At the 5th round, Ultramarina and Onze Unidos' win put both AJAC and Vulcânicos out of playoff competition. The final match of the season was a two-goal draw with Maio's Onze Unidos and AJAC finished last in the group with four points and scored 7 goals, overall it was 10th and AJAC was thrown out of playoff competition.

=== 2017–18 season ===
Their 2017–18 season made another successful season for AJAC, the season's first match was a loss to Estrelas dos Amadores, then a win over Grémio Nhagar. The season seemed not to be successful as they suffered two losses, relief arrived with a win over Calheta on December 16. No relief came as AJAC lost three straight matches. Their last win was at the 9th round where they defeated Varandinha. Two draws that ended in a goal came up. AJAC had three straight losses, first to São Lourenço and was 9th place with 11 points and has a chance or remaining in the division next season. Their recent was to Calheta and fallen again to last place, their points being shared with Calheta along with their wins and losses, Calheta had 11 goals and 18 goals conceded, a seven difference while AJAC had nine differing to their 25 conceded with their 16 scored goals. AJAC defeated Beira Mar on March 11 and now has the same 4 wins to AJAC but had 14 points, AJAC also had 18 goals, also sharing with Varandinha, Flor Jovem and Estrelas dos Amadores, AJAC a bit escaped the relegation zone. AJAC made a goal draw with Flor Jovem, then a loss to Benfica Sta. Cruz and has 15 points, its 20 goals being shared with Estrela dos Amadores and Flor Jovem. AJAC continued to escape the relegation zone with one more match to go, with Tarrafal's Varandinha, it ended in a two-goal draw, Beira Mar's 5–3 win over Scorpion Vermelho. AJAC will be relegated into the following season alongside GD Calheta and become the next clubs to be part of the Second Division. AJAC were one of the seven unrelegated clubs of Santiago North.

== Logo and uniform ==
Its logo is colored red and white, nearly the same as Ajax Amsterdam. The home uniform has a red-white striped T-shirt with white shorts and white socks with a red stripe on top.

== Honours ==
- Santiago North Premier Division: 1

2016/17

== League and cup history ==
=== National level ===
Season	Div.	Pos.	Pl.	W	D	L	GS	GA	GD	P	Notes	Playoffs
2017	1A	3	6	1	2	3	7	11	-4	4	Did not advance	Did not participate

=== Island/Regional Championship ===
Season	Div.	Pos.	Pl.	W	D	L	GS	GA	GD	P	Notes
2014–15	2	11	12	2	4	5	11	15	-4	11	Did not advance
2015–16	2	7	26	10	7	9	52	44	+8	37	
2016–17	2	1	22	15	3	4	48	27	+19	48	Officially Promoted to the National Championships

== Statistics ==
- Best position: 4th – Group Stage (national)
- Appearances at the National Championships: Once, in 2017
- Total matches played: 6 (national)
  - Total matches played at home: 3
  - Total matches played away: 3
- Total points: 4 (national)
- Total wins: 1 (national)
- Total draws: 2 (national)
- Total goals scored: 7 (national)
- Highest number of matches played in a season: 26 (regional), in 2016
- Highest number of wins in a season: 15 (regional), in 2017
- Highest number of goals scored in a season: 48 (regional), in 2017
- Highest number of points in a season: 48 (regional), in 2017
- Total losses: 3 (national)
- Total goals conceded: 7 (national)

Other:

- Appearance at the GAFT Cup: Once, in 2017
