= Santiago North Premier Division =

Santiago Island League (North)
- Founded: 1999 (unilateral); 2002 (formal)
- Region: Northern Santiago Island including Assomada, Cape Verde
- Number of clubs: 12
- Promotion to: Cape Verdean Football Championship
- Relegation to: Santiago North Second Division
- Current champions: AJAC da Calheta (official, 1st time) (2016-17)
- Most championships: Scorpions Vermelho (4 times)
- Website: Official website

The Santiago Island League (North) is a regional championship played in Santiago Island, Cape Verde. The competition is organized by the Santiago North Regional Football Association (Associação Regional de Futebol de Santiago Sul, ARFSS). The winner of the championship plays in Cape Verdean football Championships of each season.

== History ==
The league was formed in 1999, the champion qualified into the single island championship which challenged the South Zone champion and the winner qualified into the National Championships, in 2003, the Santiago Island League was split into the north and south zones and was formally created, the two are the youngest island league in Cape Verde. In 2003, the league had into the northcentral and southcentral groups and several teams from the Second Level from the north became a single group. The competition was not held for the 2006 season. Clubs from São Domingos would participate in the South Zone as a couple of more clubs were created in the North Zone, also being almost equal to half of the island's population. Also up to 2010, it had the largest land area of the football association in Cape Verde, the Boa Vista Regional Football Association took the position afterwards.. Unlike other island leagues, between 2012 and 2015, it had the first and second phases and a playoff system in which the first four clubs would participate. The 2015/16 season featured 14 clubs and the first regional league in Cape Verde to have up to 26 rounds. In the 2016 season, three clubs were relegated while the fourth to last placed club participated in the division decisional match that featured Uniāo Picos, the club won and remained for the following season and currently reduced to 12 clubs equalling to the neighbouring South Zone.

The 2016-17 Premier Division went to a halt on February 7 as the referees needed the salaries for the 17th and the 26th rounds last season and the rounds of this season., it did not resumed until February 25 as the referees were paid four days earlier by its sponsorship of two telecommunications companies, one of them was Cabo Verde Telecom and the municipalities where the clubs are based.

Benfica Santa Cruz protested the result as AJAC fielded an ineligible player. AJAC Calheta actually won the North Zone match, as they did not field and ineligible or suspended player in one of its matches, the regional association claimed that Benfica de Santa Cruz won the title for the 2017 season. The regional Judicial Council chose Benfica de Santa Cruz to compete at the nationals. The participation at the national level was uncertain, the manager Amarildo Semedo and other clubs opposed it as AJAC did not field a suspended player.. On the other, AJAC was to be relegated for being fake champions. This changed as the federation chose AJAC champions on May 17 as the manager said they did not field a suspended player on the match. After putting that to the federal level, In Praia, the Capeverdean Football Federation (FCF) officially revoked the award to Juventus Assomada and its 2-4 result was kept and also declared AJAC regional champions on May 17 and qualifies into the national competition as the suspended player in a 16th round match was not fielded and scored not a single goal that match, Juventus Assomada was relegated as they were officially 11th place for the season. AJAC's manager said justice is protected in sports.

As three clubs were relegated for the 2017–18 season to the Second Division, the Premier Division had its last club reduction which reduced it to ten, tying to Fogo's Premier Division total which is second and two less than the south of the island.

=== Title history ===
Scorpions has the most titles with four, second Estrelas dos Amadores with 3 and six clubs with a title, Barcelona in 2003, Beira-Mar in 2015, the recent winner, Benfica in 2011, Desportivo de Santa Cruz in 2011, Flor Jovem from Calheta in 2005, Grémio Nhagar in 2014 and Varandinha in 2016. Benfica Santa Cruz and some clubs knew that a suspended player played in one of AJAC's matches after May 7. AJAC were fake champions, now officially no champions were decided until May 11, Benfica won their second and recent title.

After an official statement on 11 May 2017, both Tarrafal and Santa Cruz share the most titles won in the North Zone. Tarrafal since its foundation has the most titles won by clubs numbering seven, in its year of foundation, it was the sole title, in 2002, it was tied with Santa Cruz, since 2003, it has the most titles won by the municipality's clubs with the exception of 2008 which was tied with Santa Cruz in 2008, in 2010, in 2012 and in 2015, in between these, Santa Cruz was the leader in 2011 and from 2013 to 2015. Tarrafal has the sole most titles since. Third is São Miguel with two titles and fourth is Santa Catarina with a title in 2014.

== Santiago North Premier Division clubs - 2017–18 season ==
- AJAC - Calheta
- Beira-Mar - Chão Bom/Tarrafal
- Benfica - Santa Cruz
- Desportivo da Calheta
- Estrela dos Amadores (Tarrafal)
- Flor Jovem - São Miguel
- Grémio Desportivo de Nhagar - Assomada North
- GDR São Lourenço - São Lourenço
- Scorpion Vermelho - Pedra Badejo and Santa Cruz
- Varandinha - Tarrafal

== Winners ==
=== Santiago North Regional Championships ===
- 1999/00 : Barcelona (Tarrafal)
- 2000/01 : not held
- 2001/02 : Desportivo de Santa Cruz
- 2002/03 : Barcelona (Tarrafal)
- 2003/04 : Estrela dos Amadores (Tarrafal)
- 2004/05 : Flor Jovem da Calheta
- 2005/06 : not held
- 2006/07 : Scorpions (Santa Cruz)
- 2007/08 : Scorpions (Santa Cruz)
- 2008/09 : Estrela dos Amadores
- 2009/10 : Scorpions (Santa Cruz)
- 2010/11 : Benfica de Santa Cruz
- 2011/12 : Estrela dos Amadores
- 2012/13 : Scorpions (Santa Cruz)
- 2013/14 : Grémio Nhágar
- 2014/15 : Beira-Mar

=== Santiago North Premier Division ===
- 2015-16: Varandinha
- 2016–17: AJAC da Calheta
- 2017–18: Scorpion Vermelho

=== Performance By Club ===
Club	Winners	Winning years
CD Scorpion Vermelho	5	2007, 2008, 2010, 2013, 2018
Estrela dos Amadores	3	2004, 2009, 2012
Barcelona	2	2000, 2003
AJAC da Calheta	1	2017
Beira-Mar	1	2015
Benfica de Santa Cruz	1	2011
Desportivo de Santa Cruz	1	2002
Flor Jovem da Calheta	1	2005
Grémio Nhágar	1	2014
Varandinha	1	2016

=== Performance by municipality ===
Municipality	Winners	Winning years
Tarrafal	7	2000, 2003, 2004, 2009, 2012, 2015, 2016
Santa Cruz	7	2002, 2007, 2008, 2010, 2011, 2013, 2018
São Miguel	2	2005, 2017
Santa Catarina	1	2014

== See also ==
- Sport in Santiago, Cape Verde
- Santiago North Cup
