= Grémio Nhagar =

- Full name: Grémio Desportivo (de) Nhagar
- Founded: 12 April 2001
- Ground: Estádio Municipal de Cumbém; Assomada, Cape Verde
- Capacity: 2,000
- Chairman: Mandel da Lomba
- League: Santiago Island League (North)
- 2015–16: 8th

Grémio Desportivo de Nhagar, not often with an accented a as Nhágar is a football club that plays in the Premier division of the Santiago North Zone League in Cape Verde. It is based in the neighborhood of Nhàgar (whose name is of Guinean, Mandinka origin) in the city of Assomada in the middle of the island of Santiago and plays in the Cumbém Stadium (also known as Assomada Stadium) with a capacity that serves 5,000. Since the implementation of the two tier regional system in 2015, Grémio Nhágar are one of ten unrelegated clubs of northern Santiago. Its current chairman as of 2014 is Mandel da Lomba since 24 October 2014.

== History ==
The club was founded in 2001. It celebrated its 10th anniversary in 2011. Grémio Nhagar qualified after being the top three in the 2014 season and later won their only regional title and is the only club from Santa Catarina who won a title to date, later they competed once in the National Championships. Nhágar finished third with eight points, two wins and six goals scored. In later 2014, the squad was reformed by the new chairman Mandel da Lomba on 24 October and did most and reaching fifth in the first phase, one below the qualification into the second phase and did not advance, Nhàgar finished for the season with 20 points, six wins and scored 21 goals in the first phase. Nhágar had their chance for new regional records in the extended season and the competition that became the Premier Division, it wasn't successful as the previous two seasons as they finished 8th with 34 points, 10 wins, four draws and 37 goals scored, a difference to their 36 goals that conceded to other clubs. In 2017, their success was partly better in points as they finished 3rd with 29 points and had 11 wins, 38 goals and conceded to other clubs less with 24. Their seasonal goal totals were shared with Calheta and Varandinha.

Grémio Nhagar started the 2017–18 season with a two-goal draw with Varandinha. At the 6th round in the end of 2017, the club had 10 points, 3 wins and a draw, shared with Beira-Mar but was fourth, the club has seven goals, three less than that club. Now Grémio made a 2–0 win over Benfica de Santa Cruz and had 14 points, continued to share with Beira Mar and shared with Estrela dos Amadores, they were fifth as they scored 11 goals. Two single goal draws were next followed by a 2–0 win over Estrela dos Amadores on 25 February and is currently fourth with 19 points, also shared with São Lourenço along with five wins, other sharing their wins are Scorpion Vermelho, Flor Jovem and Estrela dos Amadores. Grémio had 15 goals scored, nine less than São Lourenço dos Órgãos. At round 14, they had 23 points sharing Flor Jovem and 18 goals also shared with, that was also shared with Beira Mar. Nhagar defeated Calheta on 11 March and climbed to second place. Another loss struck Nhagar, the one to Tarrafal's Beira Mar, a surprising win over Flor Jovem was next and has 29 points, four less than Scorpion Vermelho, their final match will be with Benfica Santa Cruz and Nhagar completely lost a chance for another regional title.

== Logo and uniform ==
Its logo has a dark to light blue crest with its color lightened from top to bottom, the full name colored white is on top, its acronym GDN colored black is on the bottom and in the middle, an eagle feathered tab reads the year of foundation. In the middle features a ball with a book on bottom, a pen on left and a flat shovel on the right.

== Honours ==
- 'Santiago Island League (North): 1

2013/14

== League and cup history ==
=== National championship ===
Season	Div.	Pos.	Pl.	W	D	L	GS	GA	GD	P	Notes	Playoffs
2014	1A	3	5	2	2	1	6	5	+1	8	Did not advance	Did not participate

=== Island/Regional Championship ===
Season	Div.	Pos.	Pl.	W	D	L	GS	GA	GD	P	Cup	Notes
2013–14	2	1	-	-	-	-	-	-	-	-		Promoted into the National Championships
2014–15	2	5	12	6	2	4	21	14	+7	20		Did not advance into the final phase
2015–16	2	2	25	10	4	11	37	36	+1	34		
2016–17	2	3	22	11	6	6	38	33	+5	39		

== Statistics ==
- Best ranking: 3rd – Group Stage (national)
- Total points scored: 8 (national)
- Total wins: 2 (national)
- Total goals scored: 6 (national)
- Highest number of wins in a season: 11 (regional), in 2017
- Highest number of matches played in a season: 26 (regional), in 2016
- Highest number of points in a season: 39 (regional), in 2017
