= 2011–12 in Cape Verdean football =

Soccer happenings in early 2010s

Football in Cape Verde
- Season: 2011–12

Men's football
- 2012 Cape Verdean Football Championships: Sporting Clube da Praia

In the 2011–12 season of competitive football in Cape Verde:

== Diary of the season ==
- November 25: Celtic FC and GD Varanda, clubs of Praia's neighborhood of Achadinha de Baixo northwest of the center played a match in honor of Djack
- December 2: the 2011–12 Santiago Island League (South) season began
- February 11: Sporting Praia made a scoreless draw with Boavista Praia
- February 26: Juventude in Sal celebrated their 50th anniversary
- April 1: SC Santa Maria celebrated their 75th anniversary
- Académica do Porto Novo won the Porto Novo Cup and qualified into the Cape Verdean Cup
- Académico do Aeroporto defeated Académica do Sal to claim their super cup title for Sal
- Juventude da Furna won their cup title for Brava and qualified into the Cape Verdean Cup
- CD Onze Unidos won their cup title for Maio and qualified into the Cape Verdean Cup
- GD Palmeira won the 2012 Sal Island Cup and qualified into the Cape Verdean Cup
- April 29: all qualifiers listed into the Cape Verdean football championships.
- May 5:
  - Cape Verdean Football Championships begun
  - Sporting Praia defeated Juventude Sal 6-1 and made it the highest scoring match of the season, also it was one of tour with the highest goal difference which was five
- May 12: Mindelense defeated Sal Rei's Académica Operária 5-0 and made it the second match with the highest goal difference of five
- May 13: Sporting Praia defeated Académica Brava 5-0 and made it the third match with the highest goal difference
- May 27: Estrela dos Amadores of Tarrafal, Santiago defeated Académica Brava 5-0 and made it the fourth match with the highest goal difference
- June 3: Regular season ends, Sporting Praia, Académica Fogo, SC Atlético and Académica Porto Novo qualified into the semis
- June 10: the Semifinals started
- June 17: Sporting Praia and SC Atlético qualified into the finals
- July 1: No finals competition due to the 2012 local elections that took place
- July 7: Sporting Praia claimed their ninth and recent title for the club
- late-August: Onze Unidos won their only Cape Verdean Cup title. This was the recent Cape Verdean Cup held

== Final standings ==
=== Cape Verdean Football Championships ===
Sporting Praia and SC Atlético each had 15 goals and were the first in each group, second placed Group A club Académica do Fogo had eight points and eleventh in the total of goals with three. Académica of Porto Novo, second in Group B had ten points and scored ten goals. The top four advanced into the semis, Sporting Praia and SC Atlético advanced with four goals scored. Sporting Praia won under the away goals rule in the first match and Sporting Praia claimed their ninth and recent title for the club. Sporting Praia later qualified into the first national Super Cup in the following year.

=== Group A ===
| Pos | Team | Pld | W | D | L | GF | GA | GD | Pts |
|---|---|---|---|---|---|---|---|---|---|
| 1 | Sporting Clube da Praia | 5 | 3 | 2 | 0 | 15 | 3 | +12 | 11 |
| 2 | Académica do Fogo | 5 | 2 | 2 | 1 | 3 | 3 | 0 | 8 |
| 3 | Juventude | 5 | 2 | 2 | 1 | 8 | 9 | -1 | 8 |
| 4 | Batuque FC | 5 | 2 | 2 | 1 | 6 | 3 | +3 | 8 |
| 5 | Estrela dos Amadores | 5 | 1 | 2 | 2 | 8 | 7 | +1 | 5 |
| 6 | Académica da Brava | 5 | 0 | 0 | 5 | 1 | 16 | -15 | 0 |

=== Group B ===
| Pos | Team | Pld | W | D | L | GF | GA | GD | Pts |
|---|---|---|---|---|---|---|---|---|---|
| 1 | SC Atlético | 5 | 5 | 0 | 0 | 15 | 8 | +7 | 15 |
| 2 | Académica do Porto Novo | 5 | 3 | 1 | 1 | 10 | 6 | +4 | 10 |
| 3 | CS Mindelense | 5 | 2 | 1 | 2 | 10 | 4 | +6 | 7 |
| 4 | Paulense Desportivo Clube | 5 | 1 | 2 | 2 | 6 | 9 | -3 | 5 |
| 5 | Académica Operária | 5 | 0 | 2 | 3 | 9 | 13 | -7 | 2 |
| 6 | Academico 83 | 5 | 0 | 2 | 3 | 6 | 13 | -7 | 2 |

==== Final Stages ====
| Semi-Finals | | | | Finals |
| Sporting Clube da Praia | 3 | 1 | 4 |
| Académica do Porto Novo | 0 | 0 | 0 | Sporting Clube da Praia | 1 | 0 | 1 |
| SC Atlético | 2 | 2 | 4 | SC Atlético | 1 | 0 | 1 |
| Académica do Fogo | 1 | 1 | 2 |

Leading goalscorer: Gerson (SC Atlético) - 13 goals

=== Cape Verdean Cup ===
The fourth Cape Verdean Cup took place. This was the first edition that all eleven participants participated, the cup winners from Boa Vista and Brava competed. Onze Unidos won their only cup title after defeating Académica do Porto Novo 2–1 in extra time. The next edition would take place in 2018.

==== Participants ====
- Juventude do Norte, winner of the Boa Vista Island Cup
- Juventude da Furna, winner of the Brava Island Cup
- Valência FC do Fogo, winner of the Fogo Island Cup
- Onze Unidos, winner of the Maio Island Cup
- Juventude, winner of the Sal Island Cup
- Boavista Praia, winner of the Santiago South Cup
- Paulense, winner of the Santo Antão North Cup
- Académica do Porto Novo, winner of the Santo Antão South Cup
- FC Ultramarina, winner of the São Nicolau Cup
- Batuque, winner of the São Vicente Cup

=== Island or regional competitions ===
==== Regional Championships ====
| Competition | Winners | |
| Competition | Premier | Second |
|---|---|---|
| Boa Vista | Académica Operária | |
| Brava | Académica da Brava | |
| Fogo | Académica do Fogo | Grito Povo |
| Maio | Académico 83 | |
| Sal | Juventude | |
| Santiago North Zone | Estrela dos Amadores | |
| Santiago South Zone | Sporting Clube da Praia | ADESBA |
| Santo Antão North Zone | Paulense | |
| Santo Antão South Zone | Académica do Porto Novo | |
| São Nicolau | SC Atlético | |
| São Vicente | Batuque FC | Castilho |

==== Regional Cups ====
| Competition | Winners |
|---|---|
| Boa Vista | Juventude do Norte |
| Brava | Juventude da Furna |
| Fogo | Valência |
| Maio | Onze Unidos |
| Sal | GD Palmeira |
| Santiago South Zone | ADESBA |
| Santo Antão North Zone | Paulense |
| Santo Antão South Zone | Académica do Porto Novo |
| São Nicolau | FC Ultramarina |
| São Vicente | Falcões do Norte |

==== Regional Super Cups ====
The 2011 champion winner played with a 2011 cup winner (when a club won both, a second place club competed).

| Competition | Winners |
|---|---|
| Boa Vista | |
| Brava | |
| Fogo | Canceled |
| Maio | Onze Unidos |
| Sal | Académico do Aeroporto |
| Santiago North | |
| Santiago South | Canceled |
| Santo Antão North | Paulense |
| Santo Antão South | not held |
| São Nicolau | FC Ultramarina |
| São Vicente | not held |

==== Regional Opening Tournaments ====
| Competition | Winners |
|---|---|
| Boa Vista | Juventude do Norte |
| Brava | Juventude da Furna |
| Fogo | |
| Maio | |
| Sal | Académica do Sal |
| Santiago South Zone | |
| Santo Antão North Zone | Paulense |
| Santo Antão South Zone | Académica do Porto Novo |
| São Nicolau | FC Ultramarina |
| São Vicente | FC Derby |

== Transfer deals ==
=== Summer/Fall 2011 ===
- (Cape Verde) Figo (Note: To avoid confusion with another player Figo who was famous in Portugal in the 2000s, he is also known as Figo de Santiago de Cabo Verde) from Estrela dos Amadores (Tarrafal) to (Portugal) Tourizense
- (Cape Verde) Mailó from FC Ultramarina to CS Mindelense
- (Cape Verde) Vozinha from Sporting Praia to (Angola) Progresso Sambizanga

=== In early and mid 2012 ===
- (Cape Verde) Mailó from CS Mindelense to (Portugal) Leixões S.C.

== Retirements ==
- (Cape Verde) Caló (Sporting Praia)

== See also ==
- 2011 in Cape Verde
- 2012 in Cape Verde
- Timeline of Cape Verdean football
