= Brava Regional Football Association =

Regional football association

- Founded: c. 1981
- Location: Nova Sintra
- Affiliations: Cape Verdean Football Federation
- Website: Official website

Brava Regional Football Association (Portuguese: Associação Regional de Futebol da Brava, abbreviation: ARFB) is a football (soccer) association covering the island of Brava . It is headquartered in the island capital of Nova Sintra. The association are one of six in Cape Verde that covers only one municipality. It is the sublevel of the Capeverdean Football Federation.

The championship only has a single division where seven clubs participate, a club with the most points promotes into the National Championships. It has the fewest teams in the Capeverdean football or soccer and is also the smallest in area.

== History ==
The association was founded in 1982, a few years after independence. Formerly consisted of four clubs, it later risen to five, six in 2003 and seven since 2012. From 2005 to 2010, it shared the fewest teams with the island of Sal, in 2011, Brava had the 10th fewest clubs until Sal added more clubs in 2014 and put the competition into two divisions. Since 2015, the association are the remaining four associations which contains only a single level football competition.

== Organization ==
The association also organizes and functions the regional championships, the Cup, the Super Cup and the Opening Tournament, commonly as the Association Cup (equivalent to the two-tier cup in other countries which includes the League Cup). The association has seven registered clubs, the regional champion competes in the National Championships each season.

- Brava Island Championships

== Registered clubs ==
The region's registered clubs as of October 2017 include.

Club	Location	Founded	Registered
Académica da Brava	Nova Sintra		
Benfica da Brava	Nova Sintra	1996	c. 1997
GD Corôa	Nossa Senhora do Monte		
Juventude da Furna	Furna	2010	2010
Morabeza	Nova Sintra	c. 1977	c. 1980
Nô Pintcha	Nova Sintra		
Sporting Brava	Nova Sintra	1988	c. 1990
