= 2007–08 in Cape Verdean football =

Football in Cape Verde
- Season: 2007–08

Men's football
- 2008 Cape Verdean Football Championships: Sporting Clube da Praia

In the 2007–08 season of competitive football (soccer) in Cape Verde The 2nd Cape Verdean Cup was to took place that year but it was can celled due to ineligible players fielded by Académica Fogo and later Sal Rei.

== Diary of the season ==
- February 9: Estadio Municipal Arsénio Ramos completed and opened in Sal Rei on the island of Boa Vista
- Sport Sal Rei Club won their 7th title for Boa Vista
- GD Corôa won their only title for Brava
- Académica do Fogo won their 17th and recent title for Fogo
- Académica da Calheta won their 2nd title for Maio
- Académico do Aeroporto won their 9th title for Sal
- Scorpion Vermelho won their 2nd title for Santiago North
- Sporting Clube da Praia won their 4th title for Santiago South
- Solpontense won their 3rd title Santo Antão North
- Fiorentina Porto Novo won their only title for Santo Antão South
- Desportivo Ribeira Brava won their 3rd and recent title for São Nicolau
- FC Derby won their 9th title for São Vicente
- May 10: 2008 Cape Verdean Football Championships began
- Early June: The National championships took a break due to the 2008 local elections
- June 8: Two rescheduled first round match took place, one of them where Bairro defeated Fiorentina Porto Novo 6-1 and made it the highest scoring match and the largest goal difference until June 14
- June 14: Sporting Praia defeated Corôa Brava 6-0 and made it the highest scoring match of the national season
- July 5: As Académica do Fogo fielded a player suspended in the Fogo Cup, the knockout stage, Sal Rei also fielded an ineligible player and the knockout stage was rescheduled
- July 6: Académico 83 do Porto Inglês celebrated its 25th anniversary
- July 26: Knockout stage begins
- August 9: Championship finals begins
- August 16: Sporting Clube da Praia won their 7th national championship title

== Final standings ==
=== Cape Verdean Football Championships ===
Sporting Praia and FC Derby were first in each group along with Académica do Fogo and AD Bairro, second of each group. Derby had the most points numbering 15 followed by Sporting Praia. Sporting scored the most with 15 goals followed by Derby with 14, Bairro with 12 and Académica Fogo with 8. As Académica Fogo fielded an ineligible player who got the red card during the Fogo Cup final while Sal Rei fielded an ineligible player during the championships, it was the last time the national championships were delayed to July 26 while the finals were rescheduled to August 9 and 16. It cancelled the second Cape Verdean National Cup that season. Later, Derby advanced to the finals with five goals scored while Sporting Praia advanced with four goals. Derby won the first match 1-0, Sporting won the second leg 3-0 and claimed their 7th national title.

=== Group A ===
Pos	Team	Pld	W	D	L	GF	GA	GD	Pts
1	Sporting Clube da Praia	5	4	0	1	15	3	+12	12
2	Académica (Fogo)	5	3	1	1	9	6	+3	10
3	Académico do Aeroporto	5	3	1	1	7	5	+2	10
4	Sal-Rei FC	5	1	2	2	5	8	-3	5
5	Desportivo Ribeira Brava	5	1	1	3	2	6	-4	4
6	GD Corôa	5	0	1	4	3	13	-10	1

=== Group B ===
Pos	Team	Pld	W	D	L	GF	GA	GD	Pts
1	FC Derby	5	5	0	0	14	3	+11	15
2	AD Bairro	5	2	2	1	12	5	+7	8
3	Académica da Calheta	5	2	2	1	8	8	0	8
4	Solpontense Futebol Clube	5	2	0	3	5	7	-2	6
5	Grupo Desportivo, Recreativo e Cultural Fiorentina	5	0	2	3	2	8	-6	2
6	Scorpion Vermelho	5	0	2	3	2	8	-6	2

==== Final Stages ====
Semi-Finals				Finals
Académica (Fogo)	1	1	2
FC Derby	2	3	5	FC Derby	1	0	1
AD Bairro	3	0	3	Sporting Clube da Praia	0	3	3
Sporting Clube da Praia	2	2	4

Leading goalscorer: Fufuco - 9 goals

=== Island or regional competitions ===
==== Regional Championships ====
Competition	Winners	
Competition	Premier	Second
Boa Vista	Sport Sal Rei Club	
Brava	GD Corôa	
Fogo	Académica do Fogo	
Maio	Académica da Calheta	
Sal	Académico do Aeroporto	
Santiago North Zone	Scorpion Vermelho	
Santiago South Zone	Sporting Praia	GD Varanda
Santo Antão North Zone	Solpontense	
Santo Antão South Zone	Marítimo do Porto Novo	
São Nicolau	Desportivo Ribeira Brava	
São Vicente	FC Derby	Ponta d'Pom

==== Regional Cups ====
Competition	Winners
Fogo	Botafogo
Sal	Académica do Sal
Santiago South Zone	Sporting Praia
Santo Antão North Zone	Unknown
Santo Antão South Zone	Unknown
São Nicolau	SC Atlético
São Vicente	CS Mindelense

==== Regional Super Cups ====
The 2007 champion winner played with a 2007 cup winner (when a club won both, a second place club competed).

Competition	Winners
Fogo	Vulcânicos
Sal	Académico do Aeroporto
Santiago North	Scorpion Vermelho
Santiago South	Sporting Praia
Santo Antão South	Fiorentina Porto Novo
São Nicolau	SC Atlético
São Vicente	Not held

==== Regional Opening Tournaments ====
Competition	Winners
Boa Vista	África Show
Fogo	
Maio	
Sal	Académica do Sal
Santiago South Zone	
Santo Antão North Zone	Paulense
Santo Antão South Zone	
São Nicolau	Unknown
São Vicente	CS Mindelense

== Famous debutants ==
- Babanco - 22-year-old midfielder, debuted with Sporting Praia of the Santiago South Zone and later the national championships
- Kuca - 18-year-old forward, debuted with AD Bairro of the Santiago South Zone
- Tom Tavares - 21-year-old midfielder, debuted with Estrela dos Amadores of the Santiago North Zone

== Transfer deals ==
- (Cape Verde) Aires Marques from Sporting Praia to (Portugal) Académica de Coimbra
- (Cape Verde) Fufuco from AD Bairro to Boavista Praia

== See also ==
- 2007 in Cape Verde
- 2008 in Cape Verde
- Timeline of Cape Verdean football
