= List of Sporting Clube da Brava records and statistics =

Football (Soccer) Club based in Nova Sintra

Sporting Clube da Brava is a Capeverdean football (soccer) club based in Nova Sintra and serves the island of Brava along with its surrounding uninhabited islets of the north. The club was founded in 1988. Sporting currently play in the Brava Island League, their last national championship participation was in the 2017 Cape Verdean Football Championships. Sporting Brava has never been lower than the second tier.

This list encompasses the records set by the club and its statistics.

The club currently is third for the most Brava titles with four behind SC Morabeza and Nô Pintcha.

All stats accurate as of the end of the 2018 regional regular season

== Records and statistics ==
- Best position: 2nd - Group Stage (national)
- Best position at cup competitions: 1st (regional)
- Best position at an opening tournament: 1st
- Appearances at the championships:
  - National: 4
  - Regional: 22
- Appearance at a regional cup competition: 5
- Appearances at regional super cup competition: 3
- Total matches played: 21 (national)
  - Total matches played at home: 9
  - Total matches played away: 12
- Total points: 19 (national)
- Total wins: 5 (national)
  - Total wins at home: 3
  - Total wins away: 2
- Total draws: 4 (national)
  - Total draws at home: 3
  - Total draws away: 1
- Total goals scored: 20 (national)
- Best season:
  - National: 2017 (3 wins, 1 draw, 6 goals, 10 pts)
  - Regional: 2017 (12 wins, 0 draws, 0 losses)
- Highest number of goals scored in a season:
  - National: 6, in 2016 and in 2017
  - Regional: 67, in 2017
- Highest number of points in a season:
  - National: 10, in 2017
  - Regional: 36, in 2017
- Highest number of wins in a season:
  - National 3, in 2017
  - Regional: 12 in 2015 and in 2017
- Longest unbeaten run at the regional championships: 53 matches (April 14, 2013 – February 23, 2018)
  - Longest unbeaten run at home: 29 matches (since February 17, 2013)
  - Longest unbeaten run away: 23 matches (April 14, 2013 – February 23, 2018)
- Highest scoring match(es):
  - National: 2 with three goals
    - FC Ultramarina 4-3 Sporting Brava, 4 June 2015
    - Sinagoga 2-3 Sporting Brava, 15 May 2016
  - Regional: Corôa 2-16 Sporting Brava, 30 April 2017

Other:

- Appearance at the São Filipe Municipal Tournament: Once, in 2016
- Lowest number of goals scored in a season: 3 (national), in 2015
- Lowest number of points in a season: 1 (national), in 2015
- Highest number of goals conceded in a season: 16 (national), 2015
- Highest number of matches lost in a season: 4 (national), 2015
- Total losses: 12 (national)
- Total goals conceded: 41 (national)
- Worst defeat at the National Championships: Mindelense 6-0 Sporting Brava, May 23, 2015

== National championship record by opponent ==
Sporting Brava's first team has competed in a number of regionally and nationally contested leagues, and its national tier record against each club faced in these competitions is listed below. The team that Sporting Brava has met most in national championships competition is Derby from Mindelo whom they have contested 4 matches each after the end of the 2017 regular season.

Derby and Sporting Praia have also defeated Sporting Brava in league competition on two occasions each, which represents the most Sporting Brava have lost against any club. Sporting Brava have won two of the matches against Sal Rei, which represents the most Sporting Brava have won against any club.

=== Key ===
- † Teams with this background and symbol in the "Club" column are (and were for some clubs who are out of the playoffs) competing in the 2017 National Championships alongside Sporting Brava
- P = matches played; W = matches won; D = matches drawn; L = matches lost; F = Goals scored; A = Goals conceded; Win% = percentage of total matches won

=== All-time championship record ===
Statistics correct as of the end of the 2017 regular season

Sporting Brava national championship record by opponent
Club	P	W	D	L	P	W	D	L	P	W	D	L	F	A	Win%
Club	Home				Away				Total						Win%
Académica do Porto Novo					1	0	1	0	1	0	1	0	0	5	0%
Académico do Aeroporto do Sal					1	0	0	1	1	0	0	1	1	2	0%
SC Atlético					1	0	0	1	1	0	0	1	0	1	0%
Boavista Praia	1	0	0	1					1	0	0	1	0	3	0%
Beira-Mar Tarrafal	1	0	1	0					1	0	1	0	1	1	0%
FC Derby	3	1	0	2	1	0	0	1	4	1	0	3	5	5	25%
Desportivo da Praia					1	0	0	1	1	0	0	1	1	2	0%
Grémio Nhágar					1	0	1	0	1	0	1	0	1	1	0%
CS Mindelense	0	0	0	0	1	0	0	1	1	0	0	1	0	6	0%
Paulense	1	0	1	0					1	0	1	0	1	1	0%
CD Sinagoga					1	1	0	0	1	1	0	0	3	2	100%
Sport Sal Rei Club	1	1	0	0	1	1	0	0	2	2	0	0	3	1	100%
Sporting Praia	1	0	1	0	2	0	0	2	3	0	1	2	0	4	0%
Ultramarina Tarrafal (São Nicolau)					1	0	0	1	1	0	0	1	3	4	0%
Varandinha	1	1	0	0					1	1	0	1	2	1	100%
Total	9	3	3	3	12	2	2	9	21	5	4	12	20	41	23.81%
