= 2012 Cape Verdean Cup =

2012 Cape Verdean Cup Taça Nacional de Cabo Verde
Tournament details
- Dates: 11–24 August
- Teams: 10

Final positions
- Champions: Onze Unidos
- Runner-up: Académica do Porto Novo

The 2012 Cape Verdean Cup (Taça Nacional de Cabo Verde de 2012) season was the 5th competition of the regional football cup in Cape Verde. The season started on 11 August and finished with the cup final on 24 August. The cup competition was organized by the Cape Verdean Football Federation (Federação Caboverdiana de Futebol, FCF). Maio's Onze Unidos won their only title.

A total of 10 clubs participated. 10 played in the qualifying round, Paulense, Valência do Fogo and AD Bairro. Juventude do Norte did not play their match on August 18 which was with Sal's GD Palmeira, Palmeira was awarded an 0-3 win. Ultramarina of São Nicolau and Mindelo's Falcões do Norte directly qualified into group stage.

Its group stage consisted of two groups with three teams each (six total) and had two matches played. All remaining matches along with the final were played at Estádio Marcelo Leitão in Espargos, Sal.

No cup competitions took place from 2013 to 2017 due to financial, material and scheduling concerns, the next one would take place in 2018.

== Participating clubs ==
- Juventude do Norte, winner of the Boa Vista Island Cup
- Juventude da Furna, winner of the Brava Island Cup
- Valência FC do Fogo, winner of the Fogo Island Cup
- Onze Unidos, winner of the Maio Island Cup
- Juventude, winner of the Sal Island Cup
- Boavista Praia, winner of the Santiago South Cup
- Paulense, winner of the Santo Antão North Cup
- Académica do Porto Novo, winner of the Santo Antão South Cup
- FC Ultramarina, winner of the São Nicolau Cup
- Batuque, winner of the São Vicente Cup

== First round ==
10 clubs took part.

== Group stage ==
Six clubs took part, three each in one of the two groups. This lasted for three days, each club had a bye week for the round. The club with the most points (sometimes a win or more or goals) qualified into the final.

=== Group A ===
Pos	Team	Pld	W	D	L	GF	GA	GD	Pts
1	Académica do Porto Novo	2	1	0	1	3	3	0	3
2	SC Juventude da Furna	2	1	0	1	2	2	0	3
3	CD Falcões do Norte	2	1	0	1	2	2	0	3

=== Group B ===
Pos	Team	Pld	W	D	L	GF	GA	GD	Pts
1	CD Onze Unidos	2	1	1	0	7	0	+7	4
2	Palmeira Santa Maria	2	1	1	0	2	1	+1	4
3	FC Ultramarina	2	0	0	2	1	9	-8	0

== Final ==
24 August 2012

CD Onze Unidos	2-1 (a.e.t.)	Académica do Porto Novo

Estádio Marcelo Leitão
Espargos, Sal

Cape Verdean Cup 2010
Winners
CD Onze Unidos
1st title

== See also ==
- 2011–12 in Cape Verdean football
- 2012 Cape Verdean Football Championships
