= 2008 Cape Verdean Football Championships =

Cape Verdean Football Championship
- Season: 2008
- Champions: Sporting Clube da Praia
- Champions League: Sporting Clube da Praia
- Matches played: 36
- Goals scored: 107 (2.97 per match)
- Top goalscorer: (Cape Verde) Fufuco (7)
- Biggest home win: AD Bairro and Sporting Praia

The 2008 Cape Verdean Football Championships season was the 29th of the competition of the first-tier football in Cape Verde. Its started on 10 May and finished on 16 August, later than the last season. The tournament was organized by the Cape Verdean Football Federation. Sporting would win their 7th title and third straight after defeating Académica do Mindelo in penalty kicks. Sporting gained entry into the 2009 CAF Champions League, it is the last club to enter to date. No second place club would participate in the 2009 CAF Confederation Cup.

== Overview ==
Sporting Clube da Praia was the defending team of the title. A total of 12 clubs participated in the competition, one from each island league and one who won the last season's title. As Sporting Praia won the 2007 national title, Académica da Praia, runner-up of the island division would compete in the championships.

The season at the time made Sporting Praia to be the first club to win three back-to-back titles. It was the only club that got three titles until 2015 when CS Mindelense became the second club to win three back-to-back titles in 2015.

The biggest win were AD Bairro and Sporting Praia who scored 6 each match, Bairro against Fiorentina and Sporting Praia against Corôa. Two matches which one team scored the highest point and the season was not the retelling of high scoring records. Derby won all five matches in any of the group stages, the first since two teams were added in 2003, it was the only club to do so until 2012. Derby won the most matches at the national championships and remains one of the records as of 2016.

There were no competitions on the third week of May (May 17 & 18) due to the 2008 local elections.

Platini played his last match for Sporting Praia and a Cape Verdean team on the second leg of the finals before moving to Académica de Coimbra in Portugal in the following season.

The semifinals were originally scheduled for July 5 to 11, as an ineligible player was fielded, they were rescheduled to July 26 and August 2 and the finals on August 9 and 16. It interrupted the 2nd Cape Verdean Cup which was to take place in August, it was indeed cancelled, the second edition of the cup took place in the following year.

The next such rescheduling was in 2017 between Ultramarina Tarrafal of São Nicolau and Mindelo's Mindelense of São Vicente as Estádio Orlando Rodrigues had no extra keys for opening its doors so players can play a first leg match along with the personnel.

== Participating clubs ==

Participating football (soccer) clubs of the 2008 Cape Verdean Football Championships (Cape Verde)
- Sporting Clube da Praia, winner of the 2007 Cape Verdean Football Championships
- SC Sal Rei, winner of the Boa Vista Island League
- GD Corôa, winner of the Brava Island League
- Académica (Fogo), winner of the Fogo Island League
- Académica da Calheta, winner of the Maio Island League
- Académico do Aeroporto, winner of the Sal Island League
- Scorpion Vermelho, winner of the Santiago Island League (North)
- Associação Desportiva do Bairro, runner-up of the Santiago Island League (South)
- Solpontense, winner of the Santo Antão Island League (North)
- Grupo Desportivo, Recreativo e Cultural Fiorentina, winner of the Santo Antão Island League (South)
- Desportivo Ribeira Brava, winner of the São Nicolau Island League
- FC Derby, winner of the São Vicente Island League

=== Information about the clubs ===
Club	Location	Stadium
Académica da Calheta	Calheta do Maio	20 de Janeiro
Académica (Fogo)	São Filipe	5 de Julho
Académico do Aeroporto	Espargos	Marcelo Leitão
Associação Desportiva do Bairro	Praia	Várzea
GD Corôa	Vila Nova Sintra	Aquiles de Oliveira
FC Derby	Mindelo	Adérito Sena
Grupo Desportivo, Recreativo e Cultural Fiorentina	Porto Novo	Amílcar Cabral
Desportivo Ribeira Brava	Ribeira Brava	João de Deus
SC Sal Rei	Sal Rei	Arsénio Ramos
Scorpion Vermelho	Santa Cruz	25 de Julho
Solpontense	Ponta do Sol	Estádio João Serra
Sporting Clube da Praia	Praia	Várzea

== League standings ==
=== Group A ===
Pos	Team	Pld	W	D	L	GF	GA	GD	Pts
1	Sporting Clube da Praia	5	4	0	1	15	3	+12	12
2	Académica (Fogo)	5	3	1	1	9	6	+3	10
3	Académico do Aeroporto	5	3	1	1	7	5	+2	10
4	Sal-Rei FC	5	1	2	2	5	8	-3	5
5	Desportivo Ribeira Brava	5	1	1	3	2	6	-4	4
6	GD Corôa	5	0	1	4	3	13	-10	1

=== Group B ===
Pos	Team	Pld	W	D	L	GF	GA	GD	Pts
1	FC Derby	5	5	0	0	14	3	+11	15
2	AD Bairro	5	2	2	1	12	5	+7	8
3	Académica da Calheta	5	2	2	1	8	8	0	8
4	Solpontense Futebol Clube	5	2	0	3	5	7	-2	6
5	Fiorentina Porto Novo	5	0	2	3	2	8	-6	2
6	Scorpion Vermelho	5	0	2	3	2	8	-6	2

== Results ==
Week 1
Home	Score	Visitor	Date
Sal Rei	0 - 1	Académico Aeroporto	10 May
Sporting Praia	2 - 0	Ribeira Brava	10 May
Corôa	0 - 2	Académica Fogo	8 June
Derby	4 - 1	Scorpion Vermelho	10 May
Académica Calheta	1 - 0	Solpotense	10 May
Bairro	6 - 1	Fiorentina	8 June

Week 2
Home	Score	Visitor	Date
Académica Fogo	4 - 1	Sal Rei	24 May
Académico Aeroporto	1 - 3	Sporting Praia	24 May
Ribeira Brava	1 - 0	Corôa	25 May
Scorpion Vermelho	0 - 0	Bairro	24 May
Fiorentina	2 - 3	Académica Calheta	24 May
Solpotense	0 - 1	Derby	15 May

Week 3
Home	Score	Visitor	Date
Sal Rei	2 - 1	Sporting Praia	31 May
Académica Fogo	2 - 1	Ribeira Brava	31 May
Corôa	1 - 2	Académico Aeroporto	1 June
Bairro	3 - 0	Solpotense	31 May
Académica Calheta	1 - 3	Derby	31 May
Fiorentina	1 - 0	Scorpion Vermelho	31 May

Week 4
Home	Score	Visitor	Date
Sporting Praia	6 - 0	Corôa	14 June
Académica Fogo	1 - 1	Académico Aeroporto	14 June
Ribeira Brava	0 - 0	Sal Rei	15 June
Derby	1 - 0	Bairro	14 June
Fiorentina	1 - 2	Solpotense	14 June
Scorpion Vermelho	canc.	Académica Calheta	15 June

Week 5
Home	Score	Visitor	Date
Sporting Praia	3 - 0	Académica Fogo	28 June
Académico Aeroporto	2 - 0	Ribeira Brava	28 June
Corôa	2 - 2	Sal Rei	29 June
Derby	5 - 1	Fiorentina	28 June
Solpotense	3 - 1	Scorpion Vermelho	28 June
Bairro	3 - 3	Académica Calheta	5 June

== Final Stages ==
Semi-Finals				Finals
Académica (Fogo)	1	1	2
FC Derby	2	3	5	FC Derby	1	0	1
AD Bairro	3	0	3	Sporting Clube da Praia	0	3	3
Sporting Clube da Praia	2	2	4

=== Semi-finals ===
26 July 2008

AD Bairro	3:2	Sporting Clube da Praia

Estádio da Várzea
Praia
26 July 2008

Académica do Fogo	1:2	FC Derby

Estadio 5 de Julho
São Filipe
2 August 2008

Sporting Clube da Praia	2:0	AD Bairro

Estádio da Várzea
Praia
2 August 2008

FC Derby	2:1	Académica do Fogo

Estádio Municipal Adérito Sena
Mindelo

=== Finals ===
9 August 2008

FC Derby	1:0	Sporting Clube da Praia
Nelson 36'

Estádio Municipal Adérito Sena
Mindelo
16 August 2008

Sporting Clube da Praia	3:0	FC Derby
Zé di Tchetcha 1' 21'; Platini 64'

Estádio da Várzea
Praia

Cape Verdean Football 2008
Champions
Sporting Clube da Praia
7th title

== Statistics ==
- Top scorer: Fufuco: 9 goals (AD Bairro)
- Biggest win: Sporting Praia 6-0 Corôa (June 14)

== See also ==
- 2007–08 in Cape Verdean football
