= Dário Furtado =

Cape Verdean footballer and manager

Dário
Personal information
- Full name: Dário Osvaldo Dias Furtado
- Date of birth: 14 January 1979 (age 47)
- Place of birth: Praia, Cape Verde
- Height: 1.77 m (5 ft 10 in)
- Position: Left back

Youth career
- Sporting Praia

Senior career*
Years	Team	Apps	(Gls)
1999–2000	Sporting Praia		
2000–2003	Gil Vicente	5	(0)
2001–2002	→ Ovarense (loan)	22	(0)
2003–2004	Marco	29	(0)
2004–2005	Paços Ferreira	19	(0)
2005–2015	Sporting Praia		

International career^{‡}
2004–	Cape Verde	13	(2)

Managerial career
- 2017–: Sporting Praia U-15
- * Club domestic league appearances and goals as of 7 February 2017 ‡ National team caps and goals as of 7 February 2017

Dário Osvaldo Dias Furtado (born 14 January 1979 in Praia), known simply as Dário, is a retired Cape Verdean footballer who played for Sporting Clube da Praia mainly as a left defender. He is currently manager of Sporting Praia's U-15 team.

== Biography ==
=== Early life ===
Dário Furtado was born in the capital city of Praia in the country's early years.

=== Club career ===
When he was a teenager, he started to play for the youth club of Sporting Praia.

His first club of his profession career was Sporting Praia in 1999 and played for a season.

Dário moved in 2000 to Portugal to play for Gil Vicente FC. He would, however, only appear in five top division games for the Barcelos club over the course of two seasons, also being loaned to A.D. Ovarense whilst on contract.

He spent the majority of his career in the country in the second level (Ovarense included), appearing regularly for F.C. Marco and F.C. Paços de Ferreira, and attaining promotion with the latter in 2005.

Shortly after that season, Dário returned to his country and his first professional team Sporting Clube da Praia, going on to play the remainder of his career with his hometown club until 2015. During his continued career with that club, it would be his successful years as Sporting won back to back titles up to 2009 and another in 2012. In his second year with the club at the 2006 national championship finals, he scored a goal against Sal's Académico do Aeroporto at second leg in the 43rd minute, one of three players who scored and brought the club to win their 5th national title. A year later in the 2007 national championship finals at the second leg, he scored a goal during stoppage time against Académica do Mindelo and as it was scored away, it led the club to win a third consecutive title. Dário also played at the CAF Champions League in 2007, 2008 and in 2009. In the 2009 national semis, he scored a goal against a club also based in the city Académica on June 27, the second leg at the 18th minute which was a penalty kick. Sporting automatically qualified into the 2013 national championships and made little success which did not brought the club again to the playoffs. Sporting won the recent regional title and Dário also had a slight more success there and brought the club to the semis, Dário scored nothing in the semis and was his last time he played at the nationals.

=== International career ===
Dário made his debut for Cape Verde in 2004, aged 25. He played once for the national team in the 2006 FIFA World Cup qualification, appearing 15 minutes in a 1–2 away loss against South Africa.

In August 2009, after Cape Verde was eliminated from the 2010 World Cup, Dário was called up for friendlies with Malta and Angola, scoring in the latter game (1–1 draw). On 24 May, he appeared in a friendly in Covilhã with Portugal – who was preparing for the World Cup in South Africa – playing the entire match as the minnows (ranked 117th) managed a 0–0 draw.

=== Managerial career ===
In early 2017, he started coaching the U-15 club of Sporting Clube da Praia, one of the youth clubs that he once played.

== Honours ==
Cape Verdean Football Championships winner: 2006, 2007, 2008, 2009, 2012
Santiago South Zone Championships winner: 2006, 2007, 2008, 2010, 2012, 2013, 2014
Santiago South Zone Cup winner: 2014
