= 2012 Cape Verdean Football Championships =

Cape Verdean Football Championship
- Season: 2012
- Champions: Sporting Clube da Praia
- Matches played: 36
- Goals scored: 111 (3.08 per match)
- Top goalscorer: Gerson (13)
- Biggest home win: Sporting Praia

The 2012 Cape Verdean Football Championship season was the 33rd of the competition of the first-tier football in Cape Verde. Its started on 5 May and finished on 7 July, slightly earlier than last year. The tournament was organized by the Cape Verdean Football Federation. Sporting Praia won the ninth title (eleventh overall), it would be the club's most recent title win. This time, Sporting Praia did not participate in the 2013 CAF Champions League. No club also participated in the 2013 CAF Confederation Cup. In 2012, Sporting Praia won the first super cup title and would become the first club to win both the championship and the super cup title in the same season.

== Overview ==
CS Mindelense was the defending team of the title. A total of 12 clubs participated in the competition, one from each island league and one who won the last season's title. It would be the first time that more than three clubs shared the same club name starting with Académica numbering five out of twelve. Half of Group B clubs would bear the first club name but only half would bear the name in the knockout stage. In the top semifinal bracket, those same clubs again appeared and would be the first time. Both clubs from Santo Antão, Paulense and Académica Porto Novo would later appear in the national cup competitions. It also marked the last appearance of Juventude from the island of Sal.

The biggest win was Sporting Praia who won 6-0 over Juventude from Sal. SC Atlético became the second club to win all five matches in any of the six club group stage.

The finals were interrupted due to the local elections that took place on July 1.

== Participating clubs ==

Participating football (soccer) clubs of the 2012 Cape Verdean Football Championships (Cape Verde)
- CS Mindelense, winner of the 2011 Cape Verdean Football Championships
- Académica Operária, winner of the Boa Vista Island League
- Académica da Brava, winner of the Brava Island League
- Académica do Fogo, winner of the Fogo Premier Division
- Académico 83, winner of the Maio Island League
- Juventude, winner of the Sal Island League
- Estrela dos Amadores, winner of the Santiago Island League (North)
- Sporting Clube da Praia, winner of the Santiago South Premier Division
- Paulense Desportivo Clube, winner of the Santo Antão Island League (North)
- Académica do Porto Novo, winner of the Santo Antão Island League (South)
- SC Atlético, winner of the São Nicolau Island League
- Batuque FC, winner of the São Vicente Island League

=== Information about the clubs ===
Club	Location	Venue	Capacity
Académico 83	Vila do Maio	20 de Janeiro	1,000
Académica da Brava	Vila Nova Sintra	Aquiles de Oliveira	500
Académica do Fogo	São Filipe	5 de Julho	1,000
Académica Operária	Sal Rei	Arsénio Ramos	500
Académica do Porto Novo	Porto Novo	Porto Novo	8,000
SC Atlético	Ribeira Brava	João de Deus Lopes da Silva	1,000
Batuque FC	Mindelo	Adérito Sena	8,000
Estrela dos Amadores	Tarrafal	Tarrafal	1,000
Juventude	Espargos	Marcelo Leitão	8,000
Mindelense	Mindelo	Adérito Sena	8,000
Paulense	Paúl	João Serra	2,000
SC Praia	Praia	Várzea	12,000

== League standings ==
=== Group A ===
Pos	Team	Pld	W	D	L	GF	GA	GD	Pts
1	Sporting Clube da Praia	5	3	2	0	15	3	+12	11
2	Académica do Fogo	5	2	2	1	3	3	0	8
3	Juventude	5	2	2	1	8	9	-1	8
4	Batuque FC	5	2	2	1	6	3	+3	8
5	Estrela dos Amadores	5	1	2	2	8	7	+1	5
6	Académica da Brava	5	0	0	5	1	16	-15	0

=== Group B ===
Pos	Team	Pld	W	D	L	GF	GA	GD	Pts
1	SC Atlético	5	5	0	0	15	8	+7	15
2	Académica do Porto Novo	5	3	1	1	10	6	+4	10
3	CS Mindelense	5	2	1	2	10	4	+6	7
4	Paulense Desportivo Clube	5	1	2	2	6	9	-3	5
5	Académica Operária	5	0	2	3	9	13	-7	2
6	Academico 83	5	0	2	3	6	13	-7	2

== Results ==
Week 1
Home	Score	Visitor	Date
Sporting Praia	6 - 1	Juventude	5 May
Estrela Amadores	0 - 2	Batuque	5 May
Académica Brava	0 - 1	Académica Fogo	6 May
Mindelense	4 - 0	Paulense	5 May
Académica Operária	2 - 2	Académica 83	5 May
Académica Porto Novo	1 - 2	SC Atlético	5 May

Week 2
Home	Score	Visitor	Date
Académica Fogo	0 - 0	Estrela Amadores	12 May
Sporting Praia	5 - 0	Académica Brava	13 May
Batuque	1 - 1	Juventude	13 May
Mindelense	5 - 0	Académica Operária	12 May
Académico 83	1 - 3	Académica Porto Novo	12 May
SC Atlético	3 - 1	Paulense	12 May

Week 3
Home	Score	Visitor	Date
Académica Fogo	0 - 2	Sporting Praia	19 May
Juventude	3 - 1	Estrela Amadores	19 May
Académica Brava	0 - 2	Batuque	20 May
Académico 83	1 - 3	Mindelense	19 May
Académica Operária	4 - 5	SC Atlético	19 May
Paulense	1 - 1	Académica Porto Novo	19 May

Week 4
Home	Score	Visitor	Date
Juventude	0 - 0	Académica Fogo	26 May
Batuque	0 - 0	Sporting Praia	26 May
Estrela Amadores	5 - 0	Académica Brava	27 May
Paulense	3 - 0	Académico 83	26 May
Académica Porto Novo	3 - 2	Académica Operária	26 May
SC Atlético	1 - 0	Mindelense	26 May

Week 5
Home	Score	Visitor	Date
Sporting Praia	2 - 2	Estrela Amadores	3 June
Académica Fogo	2 - 1	Batuque	3 June
Académica Brava	1 - 3	Juventude	3 June
Mindelense	0 - 2	Académica Porto Novo	3 June
Académico 83	2 - 4	SC Atlético	3 June
Académica Operária	1 - 1	Paulense	3 June

== Final Stages ==
Semi-Finals				Finals
Sporting Clube da Praia	3	1	4
Académica do Porto Novo	0	0	0	Sporting Clube da Praia	1	0	1
SC Atlético	2	2	4	SC Atlético	1	0	1
Académica do Fogo	1	1	2

=== Semi-finals ===
10 June 2012

Académica do Porto Novo	0:3	Sporting Clube da Praia
		Quinzinho; Zé di Tchetcha

Estádio Municipal do Porto Novo
Porto Novo

10 June 2012

Académica do Fogo	1:2	SC Atlético
Guy 11'		Gerson 17' 58'

Estádio 5 de Julho
São Filipe
Referee: Victor Lima

17 June 2012

Sporting Clube da Praia	1:0	Académica do Porto Novo

Estádio da Várzea
Praia

17 June 2012

SC Atlético	2:1	Académica do Fogo

Estádio João de Deus Lopes da Silva
Ribeira Brava

=== Finals ===
23 June 2012

SC Atlético	1:1 (a)	Sporting Clube da Praia

Estádio João de Deus Lopes da Silva
Ribeira Brava

7 July 2012

Sporting Clube da Praia	0:0	SC Atlético

Estádio da Várzea
Praia
Referee: Nilton Medina

Cape Verdean Football 2012
Champions
Sporting Clube da Praia
9th title

== Statistics ==
- Top scorer: Gerson: 13 goals (of SC Atlético)
- Least beaten goalkeeper: Magueti: 4 goals (of Sporting Praia)
- Greatest player: Gerson (SC Atlético)
- Greatest coach: Janito Carvalho (Sporting Praia)
- Greatest head: Ru Évora (Sporting Praia)
- Highest scoring match: Sporting Clube da Praia 6-1 Juventude do Sal (5 May)
- Largest goal difference : 5 (three matches)

CS Mindelense 5-0 Académica Operaria (12 May)
Sporting Clube da Praia 5-0 Académica da Brava (13 May)
Estrela dos Amadores 5-0 Académica da Brava (27 May)

== See also ==
- 2011–12 in Cape Verdean football
- 2012 Cape Verdean Cup
