= 2002 Cape Verdean Football Championships =

Cape Verdean Football Championship
- Season: 2002
- Champions: Sporting Clube da Praia
- Matches played: 36
- Goals scored: 117 (3.25 per match)
- Top goalscorer: Di (9)
- Biggest home win: SC Atlético
- Biggest away win: several clubs

The 2002 Cape Verdean Football Championship season was the 23rd of the competition of the first-tier football in Cape Verde. The competition started on 11 May and finished on 6 July 2002. The tournament was organized by the Cape Verdean Football Federation. Sporting Praia won their fourth title. No club participated in the 2003 CAF Champions League and the 2003 CAF Winners Cup.

== Overview ==
Onze Unidos was the defending team of the title. A total of 9 clubs, 36 matches were played and 117 goals were scored. It was one of the few seasons that the total number of points would be the champion, it had fewer games compared to other football leagues and this would be the last season to do so. The following season, they used the group system with 4 matches and with playoffs though the semis would be added, also the Santiago and Santo Antão Island Leagues would be split into two and the total number of clubs risen to 11. The number of goals were higher than any other season in history until 2005. Sporting and Bautuque shared the record total of 19 points, no other club surpassed it since, even into the creation of a three-group season with six matches for each club made in May 2017. Batuque scored the most at home, the most in a regular season.

== Participants ==

Participating football (soccer) clubs of the 2000 Cape Verdean Football Championships (Cape Verde)
- Académica Operária, winner of the Boa Vista Island League
- Académica (Brava), winner of the Brava Island League
- Académica (Fogo), winner of the Fogo Island League
- Onze Unidos, winner of the Maio Island League
- Académico do Aeroporto, winner of the Sal Island League
- Sporting Clube da Praia, winner of the Santiago Island League
- Sanjoanense, winner of the Santo Antão Island League
- SC Atlético, winner of the São Nicolau Island League
- Batuque FC, winner of the São Vicente Island League

=== Information about the clubs ===
Club	Location
Académica da Brava	Nova Sintra
Académica (Espargos)	Espargos
Académica	São Filipe
SC Atlético	Ribeira Brava
Batuque FC	Mindelo
Onze Unidos	Vila do Maio
Sanjoanense	Porto Novo
Sporting Clube da Praia	Praia

== League standings ==
Pos	Team	Pld	W	D	L	GF	GA	GD	Pts
1	Sporting Clube da Praia	8	6	1	1	22	4	+18	19
2	Batuque FC	8	6	1	1	18	5	+13	19
3	Académica (Fogo)	8	5	1	2	21	12	+9	16
4	Académico do Aeroporto	8	5	1	2	17	11	+6	16
5	SC Atlético	8	5	1	2	15	9	+6	16
6	Académica Operária	8	3	0	5	9	11	-2	9
7	Sanjoanense	8	2	0	6	8	21	-13	6
8	Onze Unidos	8	0	2	6	5	17	-12	2
9	Académica (Brava)	8	0	1	7	2	27	-25	1

== Results ==
Club	Prai	Batu	Fogo	Sal	SCAt	SalR	Sanj	Onze	Brav
Sporting Clube da Praia		1-1	3-0	3-1				2-0	
Batuque FC				4-1	3-0	3-0	4-1		
Académica (Fogo)		2-1		1-2		4-2	5-1		
Académico do Aeroporto					3-0	2-1	4-1		3-0
SC Atlético	2-1		1-1					3-0	6-0
Académico Sal Rei	0-1				0-1		2-0		2-0
Sanjoanense (Porto Novo)	0-2				1-2			2-1	2-1
Onze Unidos		0-1	2-5	1-1		0-2			
Académica (Brava)	0-9	0-1	0-3					1-1	

Week 1
Home	Score	Visitor	Date
Sanjoanense	2 - 1	Onze Unidos	11 May
Académica Fogo	4 - 2	Académica Operaria	11 May
Atlético	2 - 1	Sporting Praia	11 May
Batuque	4 - 1	Académico Aeroporto	11 May

Week 2
Home	Score	Visitor	Date
Académica Brava	0 - 1	Batuque	18 May
Académico Aeroporto	3 - 0	Atlético	18 May
Sporting Praia	3 - 0	Académica Fogo	18 May
Académica Operaria	2 - 0	Sanjoanense	18 May

Week 3
Home	Score	Visitor	Date
Onze Unidos	0 - 2	Académica Operaria	25 May
Sanjoanense	0 - 2	Sporting Praia	25 May
Académica Fogo	1 - 2	Académico Aeroporto	25 May
Atlético	6 - 0	Académica Brava	25 May

Week 4
Home	Score	Visitor	Date
Batuque	3 - 0	Atlético	1 June
Académico Aeroporto	4 - 1	Sanjoanense	1 June
Sporting Praia	2 - 0	Onze Unidos	1 June
Académica Brava	0 - 3	Académica Fogo	2 June

Week 5
Home	Score	Visitor	Date
Académica Operaria	0 - 1	Sporting Praia	8 June
Onze Unidos	1 - 1	Académico Aeroporto	8 June
Sanjoanense	2 - 1	Académica Brava	8 June
Académica Fogo	2 - 1	Batuque	8 June

Week 6
Home	Score	Visitor	Date
Atlético	1 - 1	Académica Fogo	15 June
Batuque	4 - 1	Sanjoanense	15 June
Académico Aeroporto	2 - 1	Académica Operaria	15 June
Académica Brava	1 - 1	Onze Unidos	16 June

Week 7
Home	Score	Visitor	Date
Sporting Praia	3 - 1	Académico Aeroporto	22 June
Académica Operaria	2 - 0	Académica Brava	22 June
Onze Unidos	0 - 1	Batuque	22 June
Sanjoanense	1 - 2	Atlético	22 June

Week 8
Home	Score	Visitor	Date
Académico Fogo	5 - 1	Sanjoanense	29 June
Atlético	3 - 0	Onze Unidos	29 June
Batuque	3 - 0	Académica Operaria	29 June
Académica Brava	0 - 9	Sporting Praia	29 June

Week 9
Home	Score	Visitor	Date
Académico Aeroporto	3 - 0	Académica Brava	6 July
Sporting Praia	1 - 1	Batuque	6 July
Académica Operaria	0 - 1	Atlético	6 July
Onze Unidos	2 - 5	Académico Fogo	6 July

=== Position changes ===
Club/Week	01	02	03	04	05	06	07	08	09
Académico do Aeroporto	9	4	5	3	2	1	3	5	4
Académica (Brava)	5	9	9	9	9	9	9	9	9
Académica do Fogo	2	5	6	6	4	4	4	3	3
Académica Operária	8	3	4	4	6	6	6	6	6
SC Atlético	3	7	1	5	5	5	5	4	5
Batuque FC	1	1	3	1	3	2	1	2	2
Onze Unidos	6	8	8	8	8	8	8	8	8
Sanjoanense	4	6	7	7	7	7	7	7	7
Sporting Clube da Praia	7	2	2	2	1	3	2	1	1

Cape Verdean Football 2002
Champions
Sporting Clube da Praia
4th title

== Statistics ==
- Top scorer: Di: 9 goals (Sporting Praia)
- Highest scoring match: Académica Brava 0-9 Sporting Praia (June 29)
- Longest winning streak: Sporting Praia
