= List of Cape Verdean league top scorers =

Below is the list of Cape Verdean Football Championships' top goalscorers by season, the list also includes each top goalscorers of the season by Region, in most parts, the Premier Division.

== National Championships ==
=== By season ===
| Season | Nat. | Name | Goals | Club(s) |
|---|---|---|---|---|
| 2001 | (Cape Verde) | Di | 9 | Sporting Clube da Praia |
| 2002 | (Cape Verde) | Di | 9 | Sporting Clube da Praia |
| 2004 | (Cape Verde) | Ravs | 11 | Sport Sal Rei Club |
| 2005 | (Cape Verde) | Zé di Tchecha | 14 | Sporting Clube da Praia |
| 2006 | (Cape Verde) | Mendes | 7 | Académico do Aeroporto |
| 2007 | (Cape Verde) | Kadú | 9 | Académica do Mindelo |
| 2008 | (Cape Verde) | Fufuco | 7 | ADESBA |
| 2009 | (Cape Verde) | Kadú | 7 | CS Mindelense |
| 2011 | (Cape Verde) | Fufura | 5 | CS Mindelense |
| 2012 | (Cape Verde) | Gerson | 13 | SC Atlético |
| 2013 | (Cape Verde) | Dukinha | 6 | CS Mindelense |
| 2014 | (Cape Verde) | Sy | 5 | Académica do Fogo |
| 2015 | (Cape Verde) | Matxona | 6 | Boavista |

=== By club ===
| Club | Won | Players |
|---|---|---|
| Académica do Fogo | 1 | Sy (1) |
| Académica do Mindelo | 1 | Kadú (1) |
| Académico do Aeroporto | 1 | Mendes (1) |
| SC Atlético | 1 | Gerson (1) |
| AD Bairro | 1 | Fufuco (1) |
| Boavista Praia | 1 | Matxona (1) |
| CS Mindelense | 3 | Kadú, Fufura, Dukinha (1) |
| Sport Sal Rei Club | 1 | Ravs (1) |
| Sporting Clube da Praia | 2 | Di (1), Zé di Tchecha (1) |

== Regional competitions ==
This section is a list of the top scorers of the season by each region, in some championships, only the Premier Division is listed.

=== Fogo Premier Division ===
| Season | Nat. | Name | Goals | Club(s) |
|---|---|---|---|---|
| 2016–17 | (Cape Verde) | Luizim | 26 | Nô Pintcha dos Mosteiros |

=== Santiago South Premier Division ===
==== By season ====
| Season | Nat. | Name | Goals | Club(s) |
|---|---|---|---|---|
| 2013–14 | (Cape Verde) | Márcio | | Desportivo da Praia |
| 2015–16 | (Cape Verde) | Matxona | 16 | Boavista da Praia |
| 2015–16 | (Cape Verde) | António Correia | 14 | Sporting Clube da Praia |
| 2015–16 | (Cape Verde) | Nildo | 13 | Académica da Praia |
| 2016–17 | (Cape Verde) | Ro | 16 | Desportivo da Praia |
| 2016–17 | (Cape Verde) | Anilton | 14 | Boavista Praia |
| 2016–17 | (Cape Verde) | Paiva Tavares | 14 | CD Travadores |
| 2016–17 | (Nigeria) | Matthew Mbutidem Sunday | 13 | Sporting Clube da Praia |
