= Brava Super Cup =

- Founded: 2011
- Region: Brava, Cape Verde
- Current champions: Académica Brava

The Brava Super Cup (Portuguese: Super Taça da Brava, Capeverdean Creole: ALUPEK: Super Tasa da Braba, Brava Creole: Super Taça Dja Braba) is a regional super cup competition played during the season in the island of Brava, Cape Verde. The competition is organized by the Brava Regional Football Association (Associação Regional de Futebol da Brava, ARFB). Its current champions is Académica da Brava who won their only title in 2016. The regional champion competes with the cup champion. If a champion also has a cup title, a cup club who is runner-up qualifies.

Several cancellations occurred including in 2011 when all of the regional football competitions were canceled. The 2015 regional cup competition was not held and recently the 2017 competition was canceled due to that the 2016-17 Brava Cup did not take place due to financial or scheduling problems.

The 2018 edition will take place later in the season. It will feature Morabeza and Sporting Brava

== Winners ==
Season	Winner	Score	Runner-up
2010-11	Not held		
2011-12	Juventude da Furna		Académica da Brava
2012-13	Juventude da Furna		Sporting Clube da Brava
2013-14	Sporting Clube da Brava		Nô Pintcha^{1}
2014-15	Not held		
2015-16	Académica da Brava		Sporting Clube da Brava
2016-17	Not held (Note: Competition was not held as the 2016-17 Brava Cup did not take place)		

^{1}Runner up in the cup final as the regional cup winner was also the regional champion that season

== See also ==
- Brava Island Cup
- Brava Island Championships
- Brava Opening Tournament
