= 2001 Cape Verdean Football Championships =

Cape Verdean Football Championship
- Season: 2001
- Champions: Onze Unidos
- Matches played: 21
- Goals scored: 55 (2.62 per match)
- Top goalscorer: Di (9)
- Biggest home win: Botafogo
- Biggest away win: several clubs

The 2001 Cape Verdean Football Championship season was the 22nd of the competition of the first-tier football in Cape Verde. The competition started on 7 April and finished on 6 June, 2001. The tournament was organized by the Cape Verdean Football Federation. Onze Unidos won their first and only title. No club participated in the 2001 CAF Champions League and the 2001 CAF Winners Cup.

== Overview ==
FC Derby was the defending team of the title. A total of 7 clubs. It was one of the few seasons that the total number of points would be the champion, it had fewer games compared to other football leagues. No club came from Boa Vista and Santiago islands as the championship were cancelled.

The league was contested by 7 teams with Onze Unidos winning the championship. 21 matches were played and a total of 55 goals were scored.

Onze Unidos finished with 14 points which became the highest number of points in the national championships with the extension of the matches from five to eight overall. The point record lasted only a year when Sporting and Batuque took the record in the following season.

== Participants ==

Participating football (soccer) clubs of the 2001 Cape Verdean Football Championships, its municipalities on the map were of after 2005 (Cape Verde)
- Nô Pintcha, winner of the Brava Island League
- Botafogo FC, winner of the Fogo Island League
- Onze Unidos, winner of the Maio Island League
- Académica do Sal, winner of the Sal Island League
- Solpontense Futebol Clube, winner of the Santo Antão Island League
- FC Ultramarina, winner of the São Nicolau Island League
- FC Derby, winner of the São Vicente Island League

=== Information about the clubs ===
Club	Location
Académica (Espargos)	Espargos
Botafogo	São Filipe
Derby	Mindelo
Nô Pintcha	Vila Nova Sintra
Onze Unidos	Vila do Maio
Solpontense Futebol Clube	Ponta do Sol
FC Ultramarina	Tarrafal de São Nicolau

== League standings ==
Pos	Team	Pld	W	D	L	GF	GA	GD	Pts
1	Onze Unidos	6	4	2	0	8	3	+5	14
2	Académica (Espargos)	6	4	1	1	10	5	+5	13
3	Botafogo	6	3	2	1	15	4	+11	11
4	Solpontense	6	2	3	1	10	8	+2	9
5	FC Derby	6	2	2	2	6	7	-1	8
6	FC Ultramarina	6	0	1	5	2	8	-6	1
7	Nô Pintcha	6	0	1	5	4	20	-16	1

Club	Onze	Sal	Bota	Solp	Derb	Ultr	NôPi
Onze Unidos		2-1		0-0	1-0		
Academica (Espargos)			1-0			2-0	3-1
Botafogo FC	1-1					1-0	8-0
Solpontense		2-3	2-2			1-0	
FC Derby		0-0	0-3	2-2			
FC Ultramarina	0-1				1-2		1-1
Nô Pintcha	1-3			1-3	0-2		

== Results ==
Week 1
Home	Score	Visitor	Date
Onze Unidos	1 - 0	FC Derby	14 April
Nô Pintcha	1 - 3	Solpontense	15 April
Académica do Sal	2 - 0	FC Ultramarina	15 April
Week 2
Home	Score	Visitor	Date
Botafogo	1 - 1	Onze Unidos	21 April
FC Derby	0 - 0	Académica do Sal	21 April
FC Ultramarina	1 - 1	Nô Pintcha	21 April
Week 3
Home	Score	Visitor	Date
Solpontense	1 - 0	FC Ultramarina	28 April
Nô Pintcha	0 - 2	FC Derby	28 April
Académica do Sal	1 - 0	Botafogo	28 April
Week 4
Home	Score	Visitor	Date
Onze Unidos	2 - 1	Académica do Sal	5 May
Botafogo	8 - 0	Nô Pintcha	5 May
FC Derby	2 - 2	Solpontense	5 May
Week 5
Home	Score	Visitor	Date
FC Ultramarina	1 - 2	FC Derby	12 May
Solpontense	2 - 2	Botafogo	12 May
Nô Pintcha	1 - 3	Onze Unidos	12 May
Week 6
Home	Score	Visitor	Date
Onze Unidos	0 - 0	Solpontense	19 May
Botafogo	1 - 0	FC Ultramarina	26 May
Académica do Sal	3 - 1	Nô Pintcha	2 June
Week 7
Home	Score	Visitor	Date
Solpontense	2 - 3	Académica do Sal	26 May
FC Ultramarina	0 - 1	Onze Unidos	2 June
FC Derby	0 - 3	Botafogo	2 June (Note: FC Derby did not show up, Botafogo was awarded 0-3)

Cape Verdean Football 2001
Champions
Onze Unidos
1st title

== Statistics ==
- Top scorer: Di: 9 goals (of Sporting Praia)
- Highest scoring match: Botafogo 8-0 Nô Pintcha, 5 May
