= Académica da Brava =

Académica da Brava Akadémica da Brava
- Full name: Associação Académica da Brava
- Ground: Estádio Aquiles de Oliveira; Nova Sintra, Brava Island, Cape Verde
- Capacity: 500
- League: Brava Island League
- 2016–17: 2nd
Home colours	Away colours

Associação Académica da Brava (Capeverdean Crioulo, ALUPEC or ALUPEK: Akadémika da Brava) is a football (soccer) club that plays in the Brava Island League in Cape Verde.

The logo and the uniform as well as other teams with the name Académica and Académico in Cape Verde is identical to Académica de Coimbra. It has a small "Br" on the bottom of the left letter A (standing for Associação, Association in Portuguese), the first two letters, the island of the club being based, Brava.

== About the club ==
Their first island title was won in 2002 and their recent in 2012. The club appeared in the national championships for the first time in 2002. They never won a single match, they had their only draw with Onze Unidos and scored two goals, one with Sanjoanense of Santo Antão, the other with Onze Unidos, the club lost 7 matches which was the worst of any club at the national championships, even with the reformatted 2017 season into three groups and an extension of a week to its championships, it remains unbeatable into the present season. Their recent appearance was the 2012 season where they won not a single match or made a draw, Académica scored only a single goal throughout its five matches in Group A in a match with Juventude do Sal.

In recent years, the club finished fifth place for the regional 2014 season and had 12 points, they had a better position at the moderate level for two seasons with third place, with 21 points, 6 wins and 19 goals in 2015. Their successes soared up further in goal numbers, nearly doubled to 40 and goal scoring, two of them over Benfica, first 5–1 at round 6 and then 9–1 at round 13 which was the highest for the club but not Brava, the season's final match was also high being 8–1 over Morabeza. Others, were additional including its 24 points, 7 wins and 40 goals. In 2017, their positions were better, the club started 7th, then fourth at the second round failing to return to have another regional title, they had one high scoring match which was 6–0 over Benfica at the 5th round where they got third place. A loss to Corôa lost that position and was fourth until they made a four match winning streak that started with a victory over once successful Juventude da Furna at the 11th round and got back third position, they climbed back to second after another win over Benfica but fewer in goalscoring which was 0–4, the final match was being awarded 3–0 as Morabeza did not appear in the season's final match. Académica finished second in Brava with 23 points, again 7 wins and 30 goals scored.

On April 29 and 30, 2017, the club was the next participant from Brava after Sporting Brava in the São Filipe Municipal and Flag Day Tournament, held during Saint Philip's Day, the club finished last place behind Desportivo de Curral Grande, a diaspora team.

Académica had a plan to finish first at the end of the season, that completely failed to start at the top positions as they lost 3–5 to Benfica on their first match on December 24 and the club started last place. Their situation got worse a week later on December 30 as they lost 0–6 to Morabeza and the club remains to be last place as of the second round in Brava. It got worse as not a single match was won at the 12th round, they only had a draw which totals a point and 32 goals were conceded, over 5 times more than their six goals scored, the least in Brava. Their worst was a 7–0 loss to Sporting which was on January 21. Their next meeting was a loss to Morabeza at round 9. Académica did not play at the 10th round. Two more losses came at the 11th round as they lost to Juventude, then a larger 0–6 loss to Sporting. Académica made their second draw, this one with two goals with Corôa and, they were a point behind Corôa. Académica suffered a loss to Nô Pintcha on March 24, the last match of the season and Académica finished seventh, since the 2012 expansion to 12 matches, for the first time, it became their worst position the club finished, not a single match won as the club has a ten match winless streak, each five at home and away, that started in December 2017. Also their worst record were their 10 losses. Académica scored nine goals, the least in Brava for the season and conceded the most with 43.

== Honours ==
- Brava Island League: 2

2001/02, 2011/12

- Brava Island Super Cup: 1

2015/16

== League and cup history ==
=== National championship ===
Season	Div.	Pos.	Pl.	W	D	L	GS	GA	GD	P	Notes	Playoffs
2002	1A	9	8	0	1	7	2	27	-15	1	Did not advance	Did not participate
2012	1A	6	5	0	0	5	1	16	-15	0	Did not advance	Did not participate
Total:			13	0	1	12	3	43	-30	1		

=== Island/Regional Championship ===
Season	Div.	Pos.	Pl.	W	D	L	GS	GA	GD	P	Cup	Tour	Notes
2011–12	2	1	12	9	2	1	38	25	+13	29			Promoted into the National Championships
2013–14	2	5	12	3	3	6	12	23	-10	12			Promoted into the National Championships
2014–15	2	3	12	6	3	3	19	15	+4	21		Not held	
2015–16	2	3	12	7	3	2	40	13	+27	24			
2016–17	2	2	12	7	2	3	30	12	+18	23	Not held		
2017–18	2	7	12	0	2	10	9	43	-34	2			

== Statistics ==
- Best position: 6th – Group A (national)
- Best position at the regional competitions: Finalist
- Appearance at a regional Super Cup: Once, in 2016
- Total matches played: 13 (national)
- Total goals scored: 3 (national)
- Total points: 7 (national)
- Highest number of points in a season:
  - National: 6, in 2012
  - Regional: 29, in 2012
- Highest number of wins in a season: 9 (regional), in 2012
- Highest number of goals scored in a season: 7 (national), in 2002

Other:

- Appearance at the São Filipe Municipal Tournament: Once, in 2017
- Lowest number of points in a season: 1 (national), in 2002
- Highest number of goals conceded in a season: 27 (national), in 2002
- Highest number of matches lost in a season:
  - National: 7, in 2002
  - Regional: 10, in 2018
- Total losses: 12 (national)
- Total goals conceded: 43 (national)
- Total goal differences: 30 (national)
- Worst position: 7th – Regional
- Worst season: 2018 (0 wins, 10 losses)
- Worst defeat: Académica Brava 0–9 Sporting Praia, June 29, 2002
