= GD Corôa da Brava =

Grupo Desportivo Coroa
- Full name: Grupo Desportivo Coroa da Brava
- Founded: 2004
- Ground: Nossa Senhora do Monte, Estádio de Futebol Aquiles de Oliveira, Cidade de Nova Sintra, Cape Verde
- Capacity: 500
- Manager: João Domingos
- League: Brava Island League
- 2015–16: 4th

Grupo Desportivo Coroa da Brava or Desportivo Coroa is a football club that plays in the Brava Island League in Cape Verde. It is based in Nossa Senhora do Monte and plays in Estádio Aquiles de Oliveira in Nova Sintra with a capacity of 500.

== History ==
The club was founded in 2004 and played their first match the same year. Coroa finished second for the next two seasons. Coroa was the island champion and won their first and only title in 2008 and appeared in their only national appearance in the 2008 Cape Verdean Football Championships and played in Group A, Coroa scored 3 goals and never won a match, Coroa scored a goal in a week 3 match with Académico do Aeroporto from Sal and lost the match, the final week match was tied at 2 with Boa Vista's Sal Rei.

Coroa celebrated its 5th anniversary after its foundation in early 2009. Coroa's success was not as much as the previous seasons, they finished 3rd for the 2009 season, Coroa finished 2nd for the last time in 2010. No competition occurred during the 2011 season. Coroa finished in the lower positions, 6th in the 2012, 2013 and 2014. Also during that time, Corôa suffered an 18 match winless streak which lasted from April 12, 2012, with their win over Nô Pintcha until February 2, 2014, it ended with their 3–2 win over Benfica. Also the club suffered 9 winless matches at home, started from March 18, 2012, until February 2, 2014, and 15 away which started from April 12, 2012, until March 7, 2015, with their win over Benfica.

Corôa celebrated its 10th anniversary in early 2014. Coroa finished last with 7th place in 2015 and conceded 46 goals that season.

The club kept a good position for 2016 where they finished fourth. Corôa Brava had a moderate season in the first few weeks in January 2017, 7th they became in the third round, then 6th at the fourth round, kept it for the remainder of the season but not when they defeated Benfica 6–3 on April 9 where they were fifth and was Coròa's recent win. The club suffered a heavy loss in the final round on April 29 and lost to Sporting Brava 16–2, they conceded the most in a match. They finished with 3 wins, the club conceded the most goals in the region numbering 56, worst then Benfica Brava's.

Coròa, the crown started the 2017–18 season at the second round as the first round was their bye week The club suffered four straight losses before a scoreless draw with Académica was made, another loss was made at the seventh round, to Morabeza before a bye week came for the club. Corôa made a two-goal draw with Benfica, the club suffered three losses and is sixth place with just two points. Another two goal draw was made, this one with Académica on March 17 and had three points, their final match was a loss to Morabeza at the 14th and final round and finished sixth place for the second straight time (fourth overall), this time with only three points, they scored 10 goals, the second least behind Académica. Their winless streak is now at 14 matches and 7 matches at home and 10 away, their second worst.

== Logo ==
Its logo features a shield used in Portuguese towns and cities, once used in Cape Verde until 1975, it top part has a golden fortress with brown bricks and silver door rims with wooden doors. It has a semicircular crest, black on left and red on right, three stars, one red and two black on right and Brava's mountain viewed from the east in the bottom. The bottom label is colored red on left and black on right and reads the club name, "Grupo Desportivo-" on left and colored red "- Coroa da Brava" on right.

== Honours ==
- Brava Island League: 1

2007/08

== League and cup history ==
=== National championship ===
Season	Div.	Pos.	Pl.	W	D	L	GS	GA	GD	P	Notes	Playoffs
2008	1A	6	5	0	1	4	3	13	-10	1	Did not advance	Did not participated
Total:			5	0	1	4	3	13	-10	1		

=== Island/Regional Championship ===
Season	Div.	Pos.	Pl.	W	D	L	GS	GA	GD	P	Cup	Opening	Notes
2004–05	2	2	10	-	-	-	-	-	-	-			
2005–06	2	2	10	-	-	-	-	-	-	-			
2006–07	2	2	10	-	-	-	-	-	-	-			
2007–08	2	1	10	-	-	-	-	-	-	-			
2008–09	2	3	10	-	-	-	-	-	-	-			
2009–10	2	2	10	-	-	-	-	-	-	-			
2011–12	2	6	12	3	2	7	20	39	-19	11			
2012–13	2	7	12	0	1	11	15	43	-28	1			
2013–14	2	6	12	1	5	6	7	22	-15	4			
2014–15	2	7	12	1	1	10	13	46	-33	4		Not held	
2015–16	2	4	12	4	1	7	17	36	-19	13			
2016–17	2	6	12	3	1	8	27	56	-29	10	Not held		
2017–18	2	6	12	0	3	9	10	32	-22	3			

== Statistics ==
- Best position: 6th – Group B (national)
- Appearances:
  - National: Once, in 2007
  - Regional: 13
- Total goals scored: 3 (national)
- Total points: 1 (national)
- Total draws: 1 (national)
- Best season: 2008 (regional)
- Highest number of draws in a season: 5 (regional), in 2014
- Lowest number of points in a season: 1 (regional), in 2013
- Lowest number of wins scored in a season: 0 (regional), in 2012 and in 2018
- Lowest number of goals scored in a season: 7 (regional), in 2014
- Highest number of goals conceded in a season: 56, in 2017
- Highest number of matches lost in a season: 11 (regional and overall), in 2013
- Longest winless run at the regional championships: 18 matches (April 12, 2012 – February 2, 2014)
  - Longest winless run at home: 9 matches (March 18, 2012 – February 2, 2014)
  - Longest winless run away: 15 matches (April 12, 2012 – March 7, 2015)
- Worst position: 7th (regional)
- Worst season: 2013 (0 wins, 1 draw, 11 losses)
- Worst defeat Corôa 2–16 Sporting Brava, 30 April 2017
