= 2016 Cape Verdean local elections =

Cape Verde local elections

← 2012	4 September 2016
- All seats on the 22 municipal councils 11 seats needed for a majority
Party	Leader	Vote %	Seats	+/–
MpD	Ulisses Correia e Silva		18	+5
PAICV	Rui Semedo		2	−6
This lists parties that won seats. See the complete results below.

Local elections were held in Cape Verde on 4 September 2016. They were a landslide victory for the Movement for Democracy (MpD), that won 18 out of 22 municipalities (13 in 2012). The African Party for the Independence of Cape Verde (PAICV) won 2 municipalities (8 in 2012).

== Results ==
=== Municipal chamber results ===
The final results are:

Municipality	Winning party	%	Seats	Runner-up	%	Seats
Boa Vista	BASTA	58	5	MpD	31	0
Brava	MpD	59	5	PAICV	39	0
Maio	MpD	57	5	OIAM	41	0
Mosteiros	PAICV	54	5	MpD	43	0
Paul	MpD	55	5	PAICV	38	0
Porto Novo	MpD	50	7	PAICV	47	0
Praia	MpD	63	9	PAICV	32	0
Ribeira Brava	GIRB	33	2	MpD	33	2
Ribeira Grande	MpD	62	7	PAICV	25	0
Ribeira Grande de Santiago	MpD	50	5	PAICV	48	0
Sal	MpD	51	7	PAICV	44	0
Santa Catarina	MpD	50	9	PAICV	47	0
Santa Catarina do Fogo	MpD	53	5	PAICV	46	0
Santa Cruz	PAICV	50	7	MpD	47	0
São Domingos	MpD	61	7	PAICV	36	0
São Filipe	MpD	49	4	PAICV	29	2
São Lourenço dos Órgãos	MpD	49	5	PAICV	48	0
São Miguel	MpD	69	7	PAICV	25	0
São Salvador do Mundo	MpD	52	5	PAICV	45	0
São Vicente	MpD	49	9	UCID	28	0
Tarrafal	MpD	54	7	PAICV	43	0
Tarrafal de São Nicolau	MpD	56	5	PAICV	41	0

=== Municipal assembly results ===
The final results are:

Municipality	Winning party	%	Seats	Runner-up	%	Seats
Boa Vista	BASTA	53	7	MpD	30	4
Brava	MpD	58	8	PAICV	40	5
Maio	MpD	56	8	OIAM	41	5
Mosteiros	PAICV	54	7	MpD	43	6
Paul	MpD	55	8	PAICV	37	5
Porto Novo	MpD	50	9	PAICV	46	8
Praia	MpD	62	14	PAICV	32	7
Ribeira Brava	MpD	33	5	GIRB	32	4
Ribeira Grande	MpD	61	12	PAICV	25	4
Ribeira Grande de Santiago	MpD	50	7	PAICV	48	6
Sal	MpD	50	9	PAICV	41	7
Santa Catarina	MpD	50	11	PAICV	47	10
Santa Catarina do Fogo	MpD	53	7	PAICV	46	6
Santa Cruz	PAICV	50	9	MpD	48	8
São Domingos	MpD	61	11	PAICV	37	6
São FIlipe	MpD	49	9	PAICV	28	5
São Lourenço dos Órgãos	MpD	49	7	PAICV	48	6
São Miguel	MpD	68	12	PAICV	27	5
São Salvador do Mundo	MpD	52	7	PAICV	45	6
São Vicente	MpD	47	11	UCID	30	6
Tarrafal	MpD	54	10	PAICV	43	7
Tarrafal de São Nicolau	MpD	56	8	PAICV	40	5
