= 2003 Cape Verdean Football Championships =

Cape Verdean Football Championship
- Season: 2003
- Champions: Académico do Aeroporto
- Matches played: 31
- Goals scored: 77 (2.48 per match)

The 2003 Cape Verdean Football Championship season was the 24th of the competition of the first-tier football in Cape Verde. Its started on 17 May and finished on 2 August. The tournament was organized by the Cape Verdean Football Federation. No club participated in the 2004 CAF Champions League or the 2004 CAF Winner's Cup.

Sporting Clube da Praia was the defending team of the title. A total of 11 clubs participated in the competition, one from each island league.

== Overview ==
The league was contested by 11 teams with Académico do Aeroporto winning the championship.

It was the first time that a total of 31 matches were played, 77 goals were scored

It would be the first time that two participants came from the island of Santiago and Santo Antão and they featured no single island championship match, they achieve two separate qualifications. Also it was the first participant of a club from Tarrafal, Amabox Barcelona and from Paul, Paulense. It was the only time that a participant of Fogo was outside the city of São Filipe, a club named Cutelinho.

== Participants ==

Participating football (soccer) clubs of the 2003 Cape Verdean Football Championships (Cape Verde)
- Académica Operária, winner of the Boa Vista Island League
- Nô Pintcha, winner of the Brava Island League
- Cutelinho FC, winner of the Fogo Island League
- Onze Unidos, winner of the Maio Island League
- Académico do Aeroporto, winner of the Sal Island League
- Barcelona, winner of the Santiago Island League (North)
- CD Travadores, winner of the Santiago Island League (South)
- Paulense Desportivo Clube, winner of the Santo Antão Island League (North)
- Associação Académica do Porto Novo, winner of the Santo Antão Island League (South)
- FC Ultramarina, winner of the São Nicolau Island League
- Batuque FC, winner of the São Vicente Island League

=== Information about the clubs ===
Club	Location
Académico do Aeroporto	Espargos
Académica Operária	Sal Rei
Académica do Porto Novo	Porto Novo
Barcelona	Tarrafal de Santiago
Batuque FC	Mindelo
Cutelinho FC	São Filipe
Nô Pintcha	Nova Sintra
Onze Unidos	Vila do Maio
Paulense	Paul
CD Travadores	Praia
FC Ultramarina	Tarrafal de São Nicolau

== League standings ==
=== Group A ===
Pos	Team	Pld	W	D	L	GF	GA	GD	Pts
1	FC Ultramarina	4	3	0	1	9	4	+5	9
2	CD Travadores	4	2	1	1	7	4	+3	7
3	CD Nô Pintcha	4	2	1	1	4	4	0	7
4	Onze Unidos	4	1	1	2	4	6	-2	4
5	Associação Académica do Porto Novo	4	0	1	3	3	9	-6	1

=== Group B ===
Pos	Team	Pld	W	D	L	GF	GA	GD	Pts
1	Académico do Aeroporto	5	4	0	1	7	1	+6	12
2	Cutelinho	5	3	2	0	7	3	+4	11
3	Batuque FC	5	3	1	1	7	4	+3	10
4	Paulense Desportivo Clube	5	1	1	3	5	8	-3	4
5	Barcelona	5	0	3	2	4	8	-4	3
6	Académica Operária	5	0	1	4	6	12	-6	1

== Results ==
Week 1
Home	Score	Visitor	Date
Académica Porto Novo	1 - 1	Travadores	17 May
Onze Unidos	0 - 0	Nô Pintcha	17 May
Académico Aeroporto	2 - 0	Académica Operaria	17 May
Batuque	1 - 1	Cutelinho	18 May
Paulense	0 - 0	Barcelona	18 May

Week 2
Home	Score	Visitor	Date
Ultramarina	4 - 1	Onze Unidos	24 May
Nô Pintcha	3 - 1	Académica Porto Novo	25 May
Barcelona	0 - 2	Académico Aeroporto	24 May
Cutelinho	3 - 2	Paulense	24 May
Académica Operaria	2 - 3	Batuque	24 May

Week 3
Home	Score	Visitor	Date
Travadores	3 - 0	Nô Pintcha	31 May
Académica Porto Novo	1 - 3	Ultramarina	31 May
Académico Aeroporto	2 - 0	Paulense	31 May
Batuque	2 - 0	Barcelona	31 May
Cutelinho	2 - 0	Académica Operaria	31 May

Week 4
Home	Score	Visitor	Date
Onze Unidos	2 - 0	Académica Porto Novo	14 June
Ultramarina	2 - 1	Travadores	14 June
Académico Aeroporto	1 - 0	Batuque	14 June
Barcelona	1 - 1	Cutelinho	14 June
Paulense	2 - 1	Académica Operaria	14 June

Week 5
Home	Score	Visitor	Date
Nô Pintcha	1 - 0	Ultramarina	29 June
Travadores	2 - 1	Onze Unidos	29 June
Académica Operaria	3 - 3	Barcelona	28 June
Batuque	2 - 1	Paulense	28 June
Cutelinho	1 - 0	Académico Aeroporto	28 June

== Final Stages ==
Semi-Finals				Finals
Cutelinho	0		0
FC Ultramarina	3	-	3	FC Ultramarina	1	2	3
CD Travadores	0	0	0	Académico do Aeroporto	3	3	6
Académico do Aeroporto	1	0	1

=== Semifinals ===
12 July 2003

Cutelinho FC	0:3 (Note: The match was abandoned at the 90th minute with the score 0-2 after a referee was attacked, Cutelinho was excluded and kicked out of the championships, Ultramarina was awarded 0-3)	FC Ultramarina

Fogo Island
10 July 2003

CD Travadores	0:1	Académico do Aeroporto

Campo do Coco
Praia
19 July 2003

FC Ultramarina	Cancelled	Cutelinho

Estádio João de Deus Lopes da Silva
Ribeira Brava on São Nicolau Island
19 July 2003

Académico do Aeroporto	0:0	CD Travadores

Estadio Marcelo Leitão
Espargos

=== Finals ===
26 July 2003

FC Ultramarina	1:3	Académico do Aeroporto
Páscoa 5'		Pu 10' 32'; Nhuca 53'

Estadio João de Deus Lopes da Silva
Ribeira Brava on São Nicolau Island
2 August 2003

Académico do Aeroporto	3:2	FC Ultramarina
Dixa		Vítor

Cape Verdean Football 2003
Champions
Académico do Aeroporto
1st title

== Statistics ==
- Biggest win: Ultramarina 4-0 Onze Unidos (May 24)
