= Estádio Aquiles de Oliveira =

Sports stadium in Cape Verde, Africa

- Location within Cape Verde
- Location: Nova Sintra, Brava, Cape Verde
- Coordinates: 14.8697°N 24.6913°W
- Operator: Brava Regional Football Association (ARFB)
- Capacity: 1,000

Construction
- Opened: 1980s

Tenants
- Académica Brava; Benfica Brava; Sporting Brava; All other clubs based outside Nova Sintra

Estádio Aquiles de Olveira, also as Aquilo de Oliveira is a multi-use stadium in Nova Sintra on the island of Brava, Cape Verde. As the island size is small, it is the only sports venue on the island. It is used mostly for football matches and is the home stadium of Académica, Benfica and Sporting, clubs based from other parts of the municipality outside Nova Sintra plays at the stadium including SC Juventude da Furna and SC Morabeza. The stadium holds 1,000 people and its ground is artificial grass. The stadium is operated by the Brava Regional Football Association (ARFB).

== Location ==
Its location is southeast of the city center at the foot of a hill just north of the boundary with João de Noly.

== About the stadium ==
The stadium stages matches of all regional football competitions, including the Brava Island League, along with its cup, super cup and the opening tournament competitions.

Each year in June during the Saint John the Baptist festival, the Tournament of Saint John the Baptist (São João da Baptista) has its matches played at the stadium.

Each year, the national football (soccer) championship competition matches takes place at the stadium featuring the club who won the island or regional championship. The only times where no official competitions took place in the stadium were in the late 1980s and in 2011.

== History ==
The stadium first opened in the 1980s when football (soccer) clubs were created on the island.

== See also ==
- List of football stadiums in Cape Verde
