= 2011–12 Santiago Island League (South) =

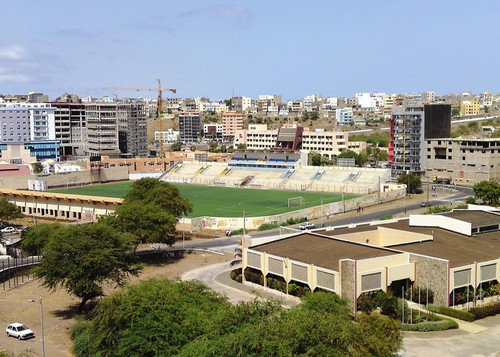
- Estádio da Várzea in 2010, where all of its Premier Division matches were played for the 2011-12 season
- Season: 2011–12
- Champions: Sporting Clube da Praia
- Promoted: ADESBA
- Relegated: Vitória FC Praia
- Matches played: 90
- Goals scored: 245 (2.72 per match)

The 2011–12 Santiago Island League (South) season began on 3 December and finished on 29 April. Sporting won the regional competition and qualified into the 2012 Cape Verdean Football Championships. The championship was organized by the Santiago South Regional Football Association (Associação Regional de Futebol de Santiago Sul, ARFSS).

Boavista Praia was the defending team of the title. A total of 20 clubs participated in the competition, each in two divisions.

== Overview ==
One of the greatest matches of the season was part of the Capital Derby featuring Sporting and Boavista which was on February 11.

A total of 245 goals were scored. Desportivo Praia scored the most numbering 46, second was Sporting Praia with 36 and third was Académica Praia with 26. 7th placed Celtic scored the least with 12, the second least was 8th placed Tchadense and the third least was last placed Vitória with 17. On the opposites, last placed Varanda conceded the most with 34, 8th placed Tchadense concede the second most with 31 and third most was 7th placed Celtic with 29. Sporting conceded the least with 13, second was Desportivo with 15.

The first round was taken by Boa Vista, Académica took it in the second round, Sporting took it in the third round, then Desportivo in the eighth round and again Sporting in the thirteenth round and for the remainder of the season.

== Competing Teams ==
All matches were played at the Estádio da Várzea.

=== Premier Division ===
Team	Place
Boavista	Praia
Desportivo	Praia
Sporting	Praia
Vitória	Praia
Académica	Praia
Varanda	Achadinha de Baixo neighbourhood, Praia
CD Travadores	Praia
Ribeira Grande	Ribeira Grande
Tchadense	Achada Santo António neighbourhood, Praia
Celtic	Achadinha de Baixo neighbourhood, Praia

=== Second Division ===
- ADESBA or Bairro
- Asa Grande - Achada Grande Tras
- Benfiquinha - Praia
- Delta
- Lapaloma
- Fiorentina de Calabaceira
- Garridos - São Domingos
- Kuminidade - Calabaceira
- União dos Norte - Achada São Filipe/Paiol/Vila Nova
- Vilanova

== Table ==
=== Premier Division ===
Pos	Team	Pld	W	D	L	GF	GA	GD	Pts	Qualification or relegation
1	Sporting Clube da Praia	18	15	2	1	36	13	+23	47	Qualification for 2012 Cape Verdean Football Championships
2	Desportivo	18	13	2	3	46	15	+31	41	
3	Boavista	18	8	6	4	25	17	+8	30	
4	Académica	18	8	3	7	26	24	+2	27	
5	CD Travadores	18	7	3	8	21	21	0	24	
6	Ribeira Grande	18	6	4	8	25	28	−3	22	
7	Celtic	18	4	4	10	12	29	−17	16	
8	Tchadense	18	4	3	11	15	31	−16	15	
9	Varanda	18	4	3	11	22	34	−12	15	Divisional decisional match
10	Vitória	18	4	2	12	17	26	−9	14	Relegation to Segundona

Updated to match(es) played on 29 April 2012. Source: FIFA.com
Rules for classification: 1) points; 2) goal difference; 3) number of goals scored.

=== Second Division ===
- 1st: ADESBA or Bairro - Craveiro Lopes, Praia

== Results ==
Week 1

2011-02-12

Boavista	2 – 0	Desportivo
Di di Mena, Nuna

Estádio da Varzea, Praia

2011-02-12

Sporting Praia	1 – 0	Vitória
Tó

Estádio da Varzea, Praia

2011-03-12

Académica Praia	2 – 0	Varanda
Tututa

Estádio da Varzea, Praia

2011-03-12

Ribeira Grande	0 – 1	Travadores
		Nando

Estádio da Varzea, Praia

2011-04-12

Tchadense	0 – 0	Celtic

Estádio da Varzea, Praia

Week 2

2011-09-12

Travadores	1 – 2	Sporting
Nando		Vargas, Carlitos

Estádio da Varzea, Praia

2011-09-12

Celtic	2 – 1	Ribeira Grande

Estádio da Varzea, Praia

2011-10-12

Desportivo	4 – 1	Tchadense

Estádio da Varzea, Praia

2011-10-12

Varanda	1 – 0	Boavista
Júnior

Estádio da Varzea, Praia

2011-11-12

Vitória	1 – 2	Académica

Estádio da Varzea, Praia

Week 3

2011-16-12

Académica	1 – 0	Travadores
Tey

Estádio da Varzea, Praia

2011-16-12

Desportivo	7 – 0	Varanda

Estádio da Varzea, Praia

2011-17-12

Boavista	2 – 0	Vitória
Madjer, Tigana

Estádio da Varzea, Praia

2011-17-12

Sporting	4 – 1	Celtic
Dário, Zé di Tchetcha, Di		Kely

Estádio da Varzea, Praia

2011-18-12

Tchadense	1 – 2	Ribeira Grande

Estádio da Varzea, Praia

Week 4
13, 14 and 15 January 2012

- Travadores 1-3 Boavista
- Varanda 0-1 Tchadense
- Vitória 0-2 Desportivo
- Ribeira Grande 2-3 Sporting
- Celtic 1-0 Académica

Week 5

20, 21 and 22 January 2012

- Académica 1-1 Ribeira Grande
- Desportivo 1-1 Travadores
- Vitória 4-1 Varanda
- Tchadense 1-4 Sporting Praia
- Boavista 1-1 Celtic

Week 6

3, 4 and 5 February 2012

- Celtic 1-3 Desportivo
- Vitória 1-0 Tchadense
- Travadores 2-0 Varanda
- Ribeira Grande 2-3 Boa Vista
- Sporting 1-0 Académica

Week 7

10, 11 and 12 February 2012

- Tchadense 1-2 Academica
- Varanda 4-1 Celtic
- Boavista 0-0 Sporting
- Desportivo 7-3 Ribeira Grande
- Vitória 1-2 Travadores

Week 8

17, 18 and 19 February 2012

- Celtic 0-2 Vitória
- Sporting 1-2 Desportivo
- Travadores 1-0 Tchadense
- Ribeira Grande 2-2 Varanda
- Académica 2-0 Boavista

Week 9

2, 3 and 4 March 2012

- Tchadense 0-3 Boavista
- Varanda 1-4 Sporting
- Vitória 0-1 Ribeira Grande
- Travadores 0-0 Celtic
- Desportivo 3-0 Académica

Week 10

9, 10, 11 March 2012

- Vitória 1-3 Sporting Praia
- Travadores 1-2 Ribeira Grande
- Desportivo 1-0 Boavista
- Varanda 1-1 Académica Praia
- Celtic 0-1 Tchadense

Week 11

16, 17, 18 March 2012

- Académica 3-1 Vitória
- Ribeira Grande 0-0 Celtic
- Sporting 1-0 Travadores
- Tchadense 0-3 Desportivo
- Boavista 2-1 Varanda

Week 12

23, 24, 25 March 2012

- Ribeira Grande 3-0 Tchadense
- Vitória 0-1 Boavista
- Varanda 1-2 Desportivo
- Travadores 4-3 Académica
- Celtic 0-1 Sporting

Week 13

30, 31 March and 1 April 2012

- Tchadense 2-1 Varanda
- Sporting 3-0 Ribeira Grande
- Académica 3-1 Celtic
- Desporitvo 0-3 Vitória
- Boavista 2-3 Travadores

Week 14

5, 6 and 7 April 2012

- Ribeira Grande 2-1 Académica
- Sporting Praia 2-1 Tchadense
- Celtic 0-1 Boavista
- Travadores 1-1 Desportivo
- Vitória 1-1 Varanda

Week 15

13, 14 and 15 April 2012

- Varanda 0-2 Travadores
- Tchadense 1-1 Vitória
- Desportivo 5-1 Celtic
- Boavista 1-1 Ribeira Grande
- Académica 1-2 Sporting

Week 16

17, 18 and 19 April 2012

- Travadores 1-0 Vitória
- Académica 2-1 Tchadense
- Ribeira Grande 0-2 Desportivo
- Celtic 0-3 Varanda
- Sporting 1-1 Boavista

Week 17

20, 21 and 22 April 2012

- Tchadense 2-0 Travadores
- Vitória 0-1 Celtic
- Boavista 1-1 Académica
- Varanda 1-2 Ribeira Grande
- Desportivo 0-1 Sporting

Week 18

27, 28 and 29 April 2012

- Académica 1-3 Desportivo
- Celtic 2-0 Travadores
- Sporting 2-1 Varanda
- Ribeira Grande 1-4 Vitória
- Boavista 2-2 Tchadense

=== Division Decisional match ===
The division decisional match was played not long before the next season started in late December. The first leg was played on December 12 and the second on the 16. The first leg was scoreless and Varanda won the second leg and Varanda remained in the Premier Division for the following season.

- First leg: Varanda 0-0 Fiorentina
- Second leg: Fiorentina 1-3 Varanda

== Position changes ==
Club / Week	1	2	3	4	5	6	7	8	9	10	11	12	13	14	15	16	17	18
Académica da Praia	2	1	2	2	3	2	2	3	3	3	3	3	3	4	4	4	4	4
FC Boavista	1	4	4	4	4	4	4	4	4	4	4	4	4	3	3	3	3	3
Celtic	5	5	5	4	5	5	7	6	7	7	7	7	7	7	7	7	7	7
Desportivo da Praia	10	3	3	3	3	3	3	1	1	1	1	1	2	2	2	2	2	2
Ribeira Grande	8	8	6	7	6	5	5	7	5	5	5	5	5	5	5	6	6	6
Sporting Clube da Praia	3	2	1	1	1	1	1	2	2	2	2	2	1	1	1	1	1	1
Tchadense	6	9	9	6	7	9	10	10	9	10	10	10	8	8	8	8	8	8
CD Travadores	4	4	7	8	8	8	6	5	6	6	6	6	6	6	6	5	5	5
Varanda	9	8	8	9	10	10	8	8	8	8	8	8	10	9	9	9	9	9
Vitória	7	10	10	10	9	7	9	9	10	10	9	9	9	10	10	10	10	10

Santiago South Zone Premier Division
2011–12 Champions
Sporting Clube da Praia
6 title

=== Statistics ===
- Biggest win: Desportivo 7-0 Varanda (16 December 2011)
