= 2008 Cape Verdean local elections =

Local elections were held in Cape Verde on 18 May 2008.

The MpD won in the municipalities of Boa Vista, Maio, Porto Novo, Praia, Ribeira Grande, Ribeira Grande de Santiago, Santa Catarina, São Domingos, São Miguel, São Vicente and Tarrafal while PAICV won in the municipalities of Brava, Mosteiros, Paul, Ribeira Brava, Santa Catarina do Fogo, Santa Cruz, São Filipe, São Lourenço dos Órgãos, São Salvador do Mundo and Tarrafal de São Nicolau.

== Results ==
=== Municipal (câmara) results ===
The final results were:

Municipality	Party	%	Seats	Runner-up	%	Seats
Boa Vista	MpD	68	5	PAICV	32	0
Brava	PAICV	57	5	MpD	43	0
Maio	MpD	65	5	PAICV	35	0
Mosteiros	PAICV	64	5	MpD	36	0
Paul	PAICV	53	5	MpD	45	0
Porto Novo	MpD	54	7	PAICV	43	0
Praia	MpD	50	9	PAICV	49	0
Ribeira Brava	PAICV	51	5	MpD	49	0
Ribeira Grande	MpD	70	7	PAICV	30	0
Ribeira Grande de Santiago	MpD	52	5	PAICV	47	0
Sal	GIMS	66	7	PAICV	34	0
Santa Catarina	MpD	55	9	PAICV	45	0
Santa Catarina do Fogo	PAICV	69	5	GIST	31	0
Santa Cruz	PAICV	60	7	MpD	40	0
São Domingos	MpD	60	7	PAICV	40	0
São Filipe	PAICV	45	4	MpD	33	2
São Lourenço dos Órgãos	PAICV	74	5	MpD	26	0
São Miguel	MpD	58	7	PAICV	40	0
São Salvador do Mundo	PAICV	63	7	MpD	37	0
São Vicente	MpD	46	4	PAICV	31	3
Tarrafal	MpD	70	7	PAICV	30	0
Tarrafal de São Nicolau	PAICV	59	5	MpD	41	0

=== Municipal assembly results ===
The final results were:

Municipality	Party	%	Seats	Runner-up	%	Seats
Boa Vista	MpD	65	9	PAICV	35	4
Brava	PAICV	57	8	MpD	43	5
Maio	MpD	65	9	PAICV	35	4
Mosteiros	PAICV	64	9	MpD	36	4
Paul	PAICV	52	7	MpD	45	6
Porto Novo	MpD	53	9	PAICV	43	8
Praia	MpD	50	11	PAICV	49	10
Ribeira Brava	PAICV	52	7	MpD	48	6
Ribeira Grande	MpD	68	12	PAICV	32	5
Ribeira Grande de Santiago	MpD	52	7	PAICV	47	6
Sal	GIMS	65	11	PAICV	35	6
Santa Catarina	MpD	54	11	PAICV	46	10
Santa Catarina do Fogo	PAICV	69	9	GIST	31	4
Santa Cruz	PAICV	60	10	MpD	40	7
São Domingos	MpD	59	10	PAICV	41	7
São FIlipe	PAICV	46	8	MpD	32	5
São Lourenço dos Órgãos	PAICV	74	10	MpD	26	3
São Miguel	MpD	58	10	PAICV	41	7
São Salvador do Mundo	PAICV	63	11	MpD	37	6
São Vicente	MpD	44	10	PAICV	32	7
Tarrafal	MpD	70	12	PAICV	30	5
Tarrafal de São Nicolau	PAICV	57	7	MpD	43	6
