= Brava Opening Tournament =

Brava Island Opening Tournament
- Founded: 2001
- Region: Brava Island, Cape Verde
- Teams: 8
- Current champions: Sporting Brava (3rd time)
- Most championships: Sporting Brava (3 titles)

The Brava Island Opening Tournament (Portuguese: Torneio de Abertura da Brava, Capeverdean Crioulo, ALUPEC or ALUPEK: Turnéu di Abertura da Braba), is an opening tournament competition (equivalent to a league cup) played during the season in the island of Brava, Cape Verde The competition is organized by the Brava Regional Football Association (Associação Regional de Futebol da Brava, ARFB). Some seasons featured rounds of one portion, some seasons featured three rounds and two groups with the top club of each group in the final match. It currently consists of six rounds, a meeting with another club once. The winner with the most points (sometimes in the final) is the winner.

Recently Sporting Brava won four straight titles for 2017 and is the current winner.

The opening tournament were cancelled in 2011 (along with other sports competitions) and in 2015.

== Winners ==
Season	Winner	Runner-up
2000-01	Morabeza	
2001-02	Nô Pintcha	
2002-03	Benfica da Brava	
2003-04	Nô Pintcha	
2005-10	Unknown	
2010-11	Not held	
2011-12	Juventude da Furna	
2012-13	Sporting Brava	Benfica Brava
2013-14	Nô Pintcha	
2014-15	Not held	
2015-16	Sporting Brava	
2016-17	Sporting Brava	
2017	SC Morabeza	Sporting Brava

== See also ==
- Brava Island League
- Brava Island Cup
- Brava Island Super Cup
