= 2012 Cape Verdean local elections =

Local elections were held in Cape Verde on 1 and 22 July 2012.

== Results ==
Overall, of the 22 municipalities, the Movement for Democracy (MpD) won in 14 and the African Party for the Independence of Cape Verde (PAICV) won in 8. The MpD won two more than in the last elections and the PAICV lost two. The MpD won 47% of the votes and the PAICV won 40,3% of the votes. The abstention was 34%, up from 19,4% in the last local elections.

The MpD won in Boa Vista, Brava, Maio, Paul, Praia, Santa Catarina, São Miguel, São Domingos, São Vicente, Tarrafal and Tarrafal de São Nicolau. The PAICV won in Mosteiros, Porto Novo, Ribeira Brava, Santa Cruz, São Filipe, São Lourenço dos Órgãos, São Salvador do Mundo.

== Overall results ==
=== Municipal (câmara) results ===
The final results are:

Municipality	Party	%	Seats	President - Winner	Runner-up	%	Seats
Boa Vista	MpD	59	5	José Pinto Almeida	PAICV	29	0
Brava	MpD	54	5	Orlando Balla	PAICV	44	0
Maio	MpD	54	5	Manuel Jesus Jorge Ribeiro	PAICV	43	0
Mosteiros	PAICV	71	5	Carlos Fernandinho Teixeira	MpD	28	0
Paul	MpD	55	5	António Aleixo Martins	PAICV	42	0
Porto Novo	PAICV	56	7	Rosa Rocha	MpD	41	0
Praia	MpD	63	9	José Ulisses Correia e Silva	PAICV	35	0
Ribeira Brava	PAICV	51	5	Américo Sabino Nascimento	MpD	42	0
Ribeira Grande	MpD	62	7	Orlando Delgado	PAICV	30	0
Ribeira Grande de Santiago	MpD	53	5	Manuel de Pina	PAICV	45	0
Sal	GIMCS	53	7	José Figueiredo	PAICV	40	0
Santa Catarina	MpD	47	5	Francisco Tavares	PAICV	47	4
Santa Catarina do Fogo	PAICV	53	5	João Amado	MpD	46	0
Santa Cruz	PAICV	51	7	Orlando Sanches	MpD	44	0
São Domingos	MpD	53	7	Franklim Tavares	PAICV	44	0
São Filipe	PAICV	36	3	Luís Pires	GIASF	35	2
São Lourenço dos Órgãos	PAICV	60	5	Victor Baessa	MpD	37	0
São Miguel	MpD	53	7	João Gomes Duarte	PAICV	40	0
São Salvador do Mundo	PAICV	57	5	João Batista Pereira	MpD	40	0
São Vicente	MpD	44	4	Augusto Neves	PAICV	30	3
Tarrafal	MpD	53	7	José Pedro Nunes Soares	PAICV	44	0
Tarrafal de São Nicolau	MpD	51	5	José Freitas de Brito	PAICV	46	0

=== Municipal assembly results ===
The final results are:

Municipality	Party	%	Seats	Runner-up	%	Seats
Boa Vista	MpD	59	8	PAICV	29	4
Brava	MpD	54	7	PAICV	44	6
Maio	MpD	53	7	PAICV	45	6
Mosteiros	PAICV	70	10	MpD	27	3
Paul	MpD	54	7	PAICV	43	6
Porto Novo	PAICV	55	10	MpD	42	7
Praia	MpD	61	13	PAICV	36	8
Ribeira Brava	PAICV	49	7	MpD	42	6
Ribeira Grande	MpD	61	11	PAICV	31	5
Ribeira Grande de Santiago	MpD	53	7	PAICV	45	6
Sal	GIMCS	52	9	PAICV	38	7
Santa Catarina	PAICV	47	11	MpD	47	10
Santa Catarina do Fogo	PAICV	52	7	MpD	46	6
Santa Cruz	PAICV	50	9	MpD	43	8
São Domingos	MpD	53	9	PAICV	44	8
São Filipe	PAICV	36	6	GIASF	35	6
São Lourenço dos Órgãos	PAICV	60	8	MpD	37	5
São Miguel	MpD	53	10	PAICV	39	7
São Salvador do Mundo	PAICV	56	8	MpD	41	5
São Vicente	MpD	42	9	PAICV	30	7
Tarrafal	MpD	53	9	PAICV	43	8
Tarrafal de São Nicolau	MpD	52	7	PAICV	44	6
