= Paulense Desportivo Clube =

Paulense
- Full name: Paulense Desportivo Clube
- Nickname: Encarnados
- Founded: November 1981
- Ground: Campo de Coqueiral, Pombas, Paúl, Cape Verde and Estadio João Serra, Ponta do Sol
- Capacity: 2,000
- Chairman: Octávio Delgado Veiga manager = Alberto Teixeira
- League: Santo Antão North Premier Division
- 2016–17: 1st, champion
Home colours	Away colours

Paulense Desportivo Clube (Capeverdean Crioulo, ALUPEC or ALUPEK: Paulensi Disportibu Klubi and the São Vicente Crioulo: Paulense Dsportiv' Klube) is a football club that had played in the Premier division and plays in the Santo Antão Island League North Zone in Cape Verde. It is based in the town of Pombas, the seat of Paúl in the northeastern part of the island of Santo Antão and is being the main club of Vale do Paul. Its current manager is Alberto Teixeira. Its nickname is Encarnados, the same nickname of Portugal's S.L. Benfica and many other clubs affiliated to Benfica. Since the introduction of the Second Division in the 2012–13 season, the club are one of two that have never been relegated, the other is Os Foguetões.

Paulense is the most successful football (soccer) club in the North Zone and the second on the island, having won about 18 official regional titles.

== History ==
Paulense won their first title in 2003 and in 2005 won two more totaling three titles in a row, the club has won two straight titles in a row in 2014 and 2015 and recently won in 2017 and has a total of seven championship titles. In other competitions, the team won two cup titles, their first was in 2013 and won two consecutive in 2016. Paulense also has four titles in a row for the Super Cup, their recent was in 2015 and four of the five Opening tournament titles were won two years each, in 2007 and 2008 and 2013 and 2014, the last title before the opening tournament competition would be held for the whole island.

The club celebrated its 25th anniversary in 2006. Later, the club celebrated its 32nd anniversary in 2013

=== Regional championships ===
In the 2014–15 season, Paulense had a ten match winning streak at the Regional Championships in two seasons, it started after a goal draw with Rosariense in the previous season on March 15, 2014 and ended in a loss on March 28 to Rosariense with the score 1–3. Paulense also had a 13 match unbeaten streak at the regionals, Paulense's last was loss was on February 13, 2014 to Foguetões 0–2. Paulense also had the region's highest match scored defeating Janela 8–0 on January 31 in a round 5 match and is Paulense's recent highest scored to date, on March 1, Paulense was listed champions. Paulense's position in the 2016 season was second place with 21 points behind Sinagoga. Paulense never reached above second place, they started at fourth, two weeks later climbed to fifth and to second for the rest of the season. Paulense had the first two rounds with draws, the second one with Sinagoga was scoreless, the only loss was to Sinagoga on March 17. Paulense scored the region's most goals numbering 20, tied with Beira-Mar. Since the last match of the 2012–13 season, Paulense had not had a loss away.

Paulense had the lead in the entire 2016–17 regionals and for the upcoming weeks and having 21 points, as Foguetões defeated second placed Sinagoga (with 10 points) on February 18, the club became listed as regional champions for the season and will participate in the 2017 national championships in May. In the last two matches, Paulense made the season's only draw with Sinagoga, then at the final round defeated Janela who after the match relegated from the Premier Division. Paulense did not lose a single match during the season and finished with 28 points and scored the region's most goals numbering 29.

=== Attempted fall, then continuation to remain in the division ===
As they had a great successful years in the 2000s and early and mid 2010s, Paulense unexpectedly turned for the worse. On December 16, they lost 4–1 to Rosariense and Paulense is last in the Premier Division and unheardly slimmed their chance of being a Premier Division club but got a chance to escape the relegation zone they were behind Beira Mar with just a point. They lost it as they had only losses at the fifth round and has become worst in the Premier Division with 13 goals conceded and is to be last place next round. Paulense made their next regional win in several matches with a win over the village of Sinagoga 0–2 at the 6th round. Recently, two more losses Paulense suffered on March 3 and was to Rosariense 0–3. Paulense made their recent win over Beira Mar and had a near medium chance of a possible relegation, never occurred to the club, Paulense had nine points, three more than Beira Mar and escaped the relegation zone. Paulense had 11 goals scored, third in the region. The final challenge was with Os Foguetões, another Paul-based club, also it was thought to be Paulense's final grip to remain in the Premier Division, they lost the match 1–3. For the first time, Paulense will be relegated after finishing last for the season, Paulense was one of the three unrelegated clubs of the Premier Division. In mid-April, Paulense finally placed outside the relegation zone as the Regional Association awarded Paulense a 3–0 win as Santo Crucifixo mistakenly fielded an ineligible player. Paulense finished fourth, it did not entirely faded for remaining in the Premier Division.

=== National competition appearances ===
Their first national appearance was in 2003. Their first match was a scoreless draw with Amabox Barcelona on May 18. A week later on May 24, Paulense scored their first national champs goal in a match with Cutelinho of Fogo who Paulense lost. On June 14, Paulense made their first national champ win over Boa Vista's Académica Operária 2–1. Paulense lost the final match of the season to Mindelo's Batuque and finished fourth with a win and a draw and had four points and was out of the competition after being outside the qualification zone of the playoff stage. Paulense made their second appearance in 2004 and was unsuccessful almost as last season, they made just a win over Santiago North's Estrela dos Amadores 3–0 on May 22 where they scored all the season's goals. On May 29, Paulense made their worst defeat ever, they lost to Sal's Académico do Aeroporto on May 29. Their third appearance was made in 2005, their first match was a won over São Nicolau's Desportivo Ribeira Brava and was 0–3 on May 14. They made their only draw on May 21 and was two goals with Académica do Fogo. The next two matches ended in losses and thus another unsuccessful season for the club. The final match of the season featured champion of the Santiago North Zone Flor Jovem da Calheta and did not play as Paulense was fourth with only four points, six behind Académica Fogo's and Flor Jovem, a weak team withdrew from the competition. On June 19, Paulense was out of the competition.

Seven years would be their next appearance, the 2012 championships, the next two seasons only had a win, their success was slightly better, Paulense had only two losses, all in the first two matches, they lost to Mindelense of the neighbouring island 4–0 on May 5 which was Paulense's second worst, then to São Nicolau's Atlético from the island capital Ribeira Brava. A goal draw was made with the island's archrival Académica Porto Novo. Paulense made the season's only win on May 26 defeating 3–0 over Académico 83 of Maio's island capital. Paulense's first away draw at the nationals was made, a goal each with Académica Operária from Boa Vista. Paulense finished fourth behind Mindelense with 5 points and was out of further competition. Paulense made it to the 2012 Cape Verdean Cup, one of four cup winners from the region that participate and one of several clubs who competed at both national competitions at the same year, Paulense was not long after out of the cup competition.

Two more national championship appearances came, in 2014, a goal draw was made with Sporting Brava on April 6 followed by a loss to Santiago South's Sporting Praia. Paulense made their fifth win as they defeated the second mightiest team of São Vicente FC Derby 0–1 on April 19, in the challenge of Santo Antão with Académica from Porto Novo, a scoreless draw was made and the final match was a loss to Santiago North's Grémio Nhágar from a subdivision of Assomada on May 4. Paulense returned in 2015, where their greatest appearance was at the semi-finalist. Their first match was a draw with Boa Vista's Académica Operária on May 9, two wins were followed, first to Maio's Académico 83, then to their archrival Académica Porto Novo. Paulense's only loss came after a defeat to Derby on May 31, Paulense won the last match of the championship season after a victory over Fogo's Spartak d'Aguadinha. At the knockout stage, they faced with CS Mindelense, Oceano scored the first leg's only goal, Paulense lost 2–0 in the second leg at extra time and was out of the competition. Also, it was Paulense's only playoff appearance at the national champs. Also that season, Oceano was awarded the greatest player of the season. Until March 2017, Paulense's total stats at the nationals had 31 matches played and had nine wins and seven draws, also the club scored 31 goals. Its victory to loss ratio of its matches was 29.03%

For the 2017 season, it was Paulense's first in the reformatted triangular phases, they played in Group B of the first phase which featured Académica do Porto Novo, champion of the South Zone, the 2016 champion Mindelense and Académico do Aeroporto from Sal. Paulense lost the first round match to almighty Mindelense. A minimal success was made, three consecutive draws were next, the third one had no goals in a challenge with Mindelense. Paulense lost 1–3 to Académico do Aeroporto at the 5th round and lost their ticket to the playoff stage, Paulense finished last in the group and suffered as they had their worst season without a win and 10 goals conceded totalling 55 and their victory to loss ratio is now less than a quarter of its 37 matches played.

=== Other regional competitions ===
The club was knocked out in 2017 cup competitions, the Santo Antão Cup in one round and the Santo Antão North Zone cup in the quarterfinals after two years of cup success.

In the 2014 subregional super cup, Paulense (as champion) defeated Sinagoga, as cup winner the 2016 title for the region's north zone, the club faced the champion Sinagoga, based just northwest in the North Zone's super cup, Paulense lost the match to Sinagoga. Paulense as champion will appear in the 2017 regional super cup and play with the cup winner Rosariense.

=== Other competitions ===
In October 2016, Paulense along with Académica do Porto Novo of another league of the south of the island were participants from outside the neighboring island in the revived and reformatted Mindelo Cup, a competition that has not been held in nearly a decade, it featured the champion of São Vicente Mindelense and the cup winner of São Vicente Salamansa.

In local competitions, Paulense won the 2016 and the 2017 Paul Municipal Tournaments, the recent one had the club finished with 6 points.

== Stadium ==
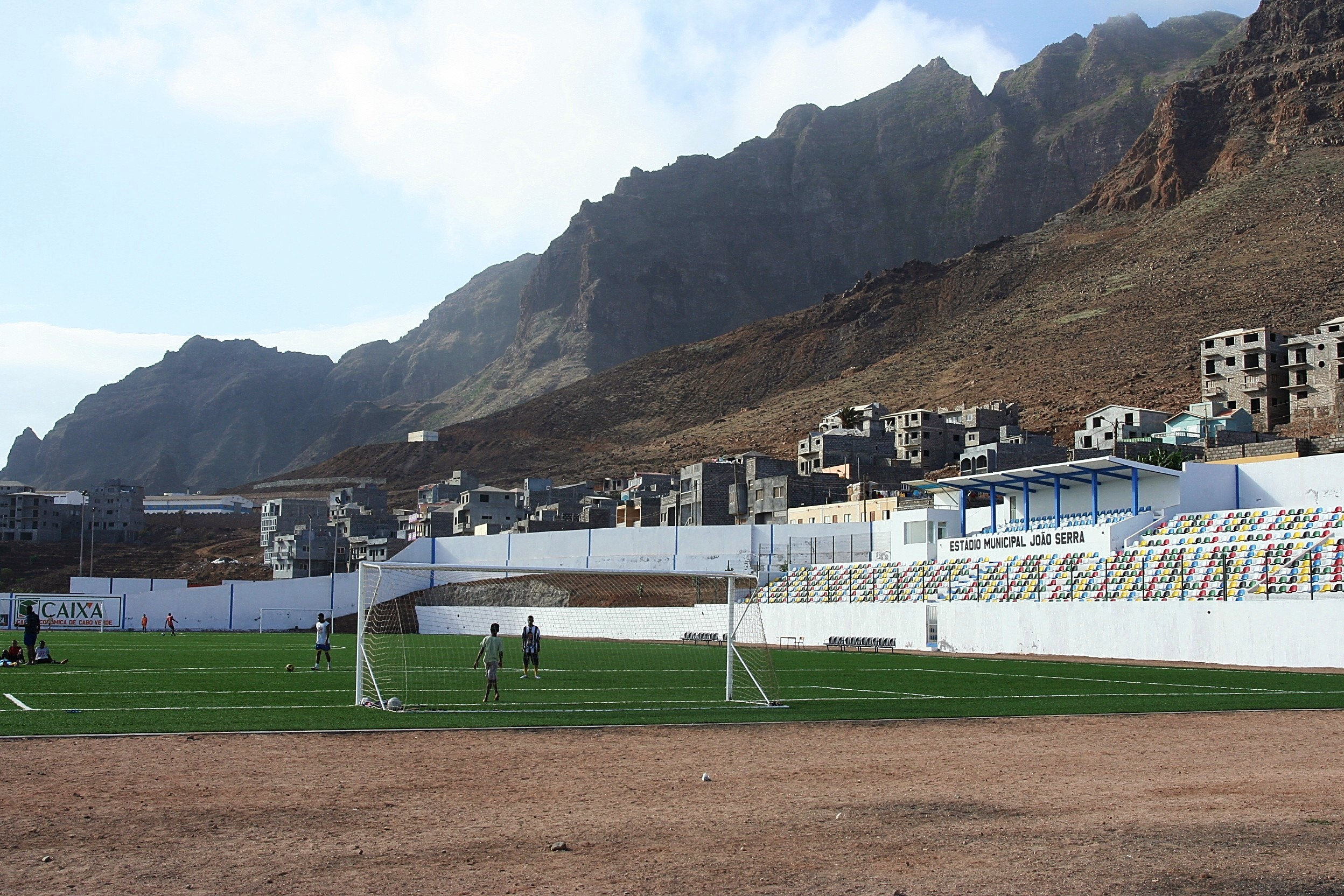
Estádio João Serra, the stadium also used by Paulense

The club has a dirt stadium located in Pombas named Campo de Coqueiral and with no seats, all of its matches are played in Ponta do Sol at Estádio João Serra as the field is slightly wider.

The club trains at the stadium and at their home field.

== Logo ==
Its logo is with a coconut crest with a golden bird above, a green-red ribbon with its motto, unlike other clubs with the Benfica based logo in the country, written in Portuguese, a red and white shield with an orange ball and a blue ribbon with the club name acronym in the middle. Except for the colour and the full semi-circular crest. Its logo is the nearly the same as Portugal's Benfica and remains an affiliate. Other logos that are the same in the nation are CD Travadores, Benfica de Santa Cruz and Benfica da Praia (rarely as Benfiquinha).

== Uniform ==
Home uniform up to November 2016

Its uniform consists of a red clothing with white sleeves used for home matches.

Up to late 2016, is uniform had a crimson red t-shirt with white rim and the remainder black for home matches.

== Rivalry ==
Its only club that is rival to is Académica do Porto Novo forming the Santo Antão Derby (Derbi de Santo Antão), from 2003 at the championships, it only appeared in the national level with their last in 2017. After Paulense finishing last for the 2017–18 Premier Division, the rivalry came to an end.

== Honours ==
- Regional competitions:
  - Santo Antão North Premier Division: 7
  - 2002/03, 2003/04, 2004/05, 2011/12, 2013/14, 2014/15, 2016/17
  - Santo Antão North Cup: 5
  - 2010/11, 2011/12, 2012/13, 2014/15, 2015/16
  - Santo Antão North Super Cup: 4
  - 2011/12, 2012/13, 2013/14, 2014/15
  - Santo Antão North Opening Tournament: 5
  - 2002/03, 2006/07, 2007/08, 2012/13, 2013/14
- Local competition:
  - Paul Municipal Tournament:
  - 2015, 2016, 2017

== League and cup history ==
=== National championship ===
Season	Div.	Pos.	Pl.	W	D	L	GS	GA	GD	P	Notes	Playoffs
2003	1B	4	4	1	1	3	5	8	-3	4	Did not advance	Did not participated
2004	1A	5	5	1	0	4	3	13	-10	3	Did not advance	Did not participate
2005	1A	4	5	1	1	2	7	6	+1	4	Did not advance	Did not participate
2012	1B	4	5	1	2	2	6	9	-3	3	Did not advance	Did not participate
2014	1A	4	5	1	2	2	3	4	-1	3	Did not advance	Did not participate
2015	1A	2	5	3	1	1	6	2	+3	10		Semi-finalist
2017	1B	4	6	0	3	3	4	10	-6	3	Did not advance	Did not participate
Total:			35	8	10	17	34	52	-18	30		

=== Regional Championship ===
Season	Div.	Pos.	Pl.	W	D	L	GS	GA	GD	P	Santo Antão North Cup	Santo Antāo Cup	Tour	Notes
2003–04	2	1	10	-	-	-	-	-	-	-				Promoted into the National Championships
2004–05	2	1	10	-	-	-	-	-	-	-				Promoted into the National Championships
2008–09	2	7	11	1	2	8	19	29	+10	5				
2011–12	2	1	16	-	-	-	-	-	-	-	Winner			Promoted into the National Championships
2013–14	2	1	10	7	1	2	25	14	+11	22			Winner	Promoted into the National Championships
2014–15	2	1	10	9	0	1	24	4	+20	27	Winner		Winner	Promoted into the National championships
2015–16	2	2	10	6	3	1	20	10	+10	21	Winner	Semi-finalist	Not held	
2016–17	2	1	10	9	1	0	29	5	+24	28	Quarter-finalist		Not held	
2017–18	2	4	10	3	0	7	12	19	-9	9	Quarter-finalist		Not held	

== Current squad ==
As of 15 February 2017

Note: Flags indicate national team as defined under FIFA eligibility rules; some limited exceptions apply. Players may hold more than one non-FIFA nationality.

No.	Pos.	Nation	Player
—		CPV	Adi
—		CPV	Lito

== Managerial history ==
- (Cape Verde) Rildo Tavares (around 2014 – February 2017)
- (Cape Verde) Alberto Teixeira (since February 2017)
