= Sporting Clube da Brava =

Sporting
- Full name: Sporting Clube da Brava
- Nickname: Leões
- Founded: 1988
- Ground: Estádio Aquiles de Oliveira; Nova Sintra, Cape Verde
- Capacity: 1000
- Chairman: Francisco Oliveira
- Manager: Ney Loko (Emanuel de Pina)
- League: Brava Island League
- 2016–17: Champion
Home colours	Away colours

Sporting Clube da Brava (Capeverdean Crioulo, ALUPEC or ALUPEK: Sporting Klubi da Brava) is a football club that had played in the Premier division and plays in the Brava Island Division in Cape Verde. It is based in Nova Sintra the island of Brava with its offices located in nearby Lem. Its current coach is Ney Loko. Its nickname is Leões (Lions), the nickname of Lisbon-based Sporting CP and many other clubs founded as branches of Sporting CP. Its current president is Francisco Oliveira and its coach is Ney Loko (Emanuel de Pina).

Sporting Brava is the second most successful football (soccer) club on the island, having won 10 official regional titles.

== History ==
The club was founded in the 1988 and is affiliate number 166. The name is identical to the Sporting Clube de Portugal along with its logo which uses its current form.

At the start of the 21st century, the club's success ranged from moderate to last place. Sporting's success at the start of the 2010s were moderate, and gained, believed to be in part of the extended regional season with the addition of Juventude da Furna. Sporting lost to Morabeza 1–4 on 10 February 2013, and was Sporting's last loss at home in the regionals, later Sporting lost to Nô Pintcha on 7 April, a previously successful club 1–0 and was also Sporting's last match lost at the regionals, their next loss was in the 2017–18 season.

Emanuel de Pina, nicknamed Loco or Ney Loko, a former player became coach of the club and made the club to have their first island title win which was in 2014 and became the island's six of seven who have regional championship titles, also they made and their first entry to the national league, they won their second in a row in 2015 and achieved their second entry. Their greatest ranking was 5th, played a total of 10 matches without any win, they scored a total of 8 goals and totalled only three points. Alongside Académica, Sporting started third for the third round as their match with Académica ended in a two-goal draw and is Sporting's last draw made. A week later, Sporting made a huge 8–0 win over Benfica and became first place which would be for the season. Their scoring successes soared, 9–0 over Morabeza, Sporting's fourth round was a bye week, then 11–1 over Corôa, it was held as the highest scoring match replacing their last two matches. Sporting next two matches were normal victories until 6 March when they defeated Benfica 0–11 and held it as the highest scoring match for two rounds. After the national elections, it became the second highest on the island as Juventude's 0–16 win over Benfica became the first. Sporting's next three match had normal wins, the final match of the season ended in a large 0–7 win over Nô Pintcha. Later, they won their third consecutive title in the 2016 season with 34 points and won all 12 matches, since the addition of Juventude da Furna in 2012, it was their highest even and was a club record, it was also their season's best. Sporting appeared at the 2016 Cape Verdean Football Championships on 14 May. Sporting finished fourth with six points with two wins and six goals scored, better than the previous two seasons, their first national match won in Round 1 on 15 May over Sinagoga, champion of the Santo Antão North Zone.

The club was first place in all of the 2017 season. On 26 March, after defeating Nô Pintcha 1–0, a second placed club and with a 12-point difference with that club, Sporting became champions for Brava and later won their fourth consecutive title. On 2 April, their goal totals quickly rose from 34 to 48 after defeating Benfica Brava 0–14 and made it the region's highest until 30 April, Sporting made a gigantic win defeating Corôa 2–16 and became the highest scoring match for the club. Sporting won all matches of the season and became their best ever since the extension of the season by the appearance of Juventude Furna. From 51 to 67 the goal totals became and a club record in Brava, even its 36-point total, also its unbeaten streak at the regionals became 49, more than Mindelense of São Vicente and Sporting Praia of Southern Santiago. Sporting also got their fourth consecutive entrance into the National Championships on 13 May and the first with a three group system, they played Group C alongside another Sporting affiliate from Praia, Sal Rei of Boa Vista and FC Derby, runner up of São Vicente. The club won the first round match over Sal Rei and the unusual on 21 May, they defeated Mindelo's one of the top two clubs, Derby and their points and wins now equals to that of last season. In the competition of two Sporting affiliates, they found out impossible to defeat the almighty Sporting Praia in Praia as they lost 1–0. One 4 June, Sporting Brava made another victory over Sal Rei at home field and now pushed themselves to a new national championship record in wins (3) and points (9) and now equals half of their previous overall point total of 18. Sporting Brava kept themselves as being the best of the second placed club for their qualification into the playoff stage up to the seventh round, their final was another Sporting challenge with a club from Praia, it ended without any goals scored and finished 2nd with a club record of 10 points, listed third in the second-placed rankings together with Derby Sporting Brava was eliminated from further competitions in the playoff stage.

Sporting attempted their another chance for a regional title, they started the 2017–18 season with a 1–3 win over Nô Pintcha, their chance was narrowly slimmed this time as Sporting started second as they had two goals less than Benfica's. At round 5, they defeated Académica 7–0 and made it the region's highest for the season, on 28 January, they won over Morabeza 2–1, also got the first position from them and kept their chance for another planned championship title and had 15 points after playing five matches, they also scored the region's most goals at 18. Sporting suffered the unexpected, a 3–1 loss to Juventude da Furna at the 10th round and lost a position to Morabeza, Sporting was second with 22 points but held the most goals scored with 32. Their final unbeaten streak number was 55 matches which lasted until 24 February 2018, of any second tier competitions in the archipelago, it is behind Académica do Porto Novo's (of Santo Antão South) 56 made from 5 March 2011, to 23 April 2016. Sporting made another win over Corôa where they scored its 30th seasonal goal and has 31 goals, the most on the island. They remained second at the round, but after nine matches, they are first place and is likely to claim their fifth title. Sporting has 37 goals after a huge 0–6 win over last placed Académica and at the round, fully regained first place from Morabeza. Sporting lost round 13 match to Morabeza 2–0 and lost a position but got their last chance for their fifth straight title and national participation which later faded. On 21 March, Sporting, four points more than Juventude, with Morabeza into the cup final, Sporting will be participant in the upcoming Brava Super Cup. Sporting's final match of the season was a 7–0 win over Benfica and scored the most goals in the region numbering 44, Morabeza's win meant Sporting lost a qualification into the national championships and finished second with 30 points, their 30 became sixth overall in Brava since their 2004 expansion to six teams. Their only record continuing is their unbeaten streak at home which is at 29 matches and incredibly 29 matches without a draw.

=== Other regional competitions ===
Their first overall title was the opening tournament won in 2013, at the time, it became the last club to receive a regional honour, later, Sporting won their third in 2017 which was also their second consecutive and their last, even the 2014–15 edition was cancelled. In the 2017 edition, Sporting failed to win another opening tournament title as they finished second with 13 points, behind SC Morabeza.

Their first Super Cup win was in 2014, Sporting won their only cup title in 2016.

Sporting went up to the semis in the 2018 Brava Cup played on 21 March, it ended in a goal draw with Benfica, later in the penalty shootout, they won 3–0 and will play with Morabeza in the final.

Sporting Brava qualified into the regional Super Cup as champion, the club lost to Académica (second in the cup as Sporting also won the cup) in November 2016.

Sporting will appear in the regional cup final for the 2017–18 season and play with Morabeza. Sporting gained qualification into the upcoming super cup as Morabeza won another championship title in eight years, Sporting's qualification status is not yet made

=== Other competitions ===
Also Sporting Brava were one of the first two clubs outside the municipality of São Filipe to compete in their municipal tournament, the other was Batuque from São Vicente Island, also it was the island's first of two clubs to compete. Sporting Brava won their only title in Spring 2016 and is the only club outside the municipality to receive a title.

== Rivalry ==
The club's only rivalry is with Benfica Brava forming the Eternal Derby of Brava (Derby Eterno da Brava), the island's only rivalry and one of the least popular.

== Uniform ==
Away/alternate uniform up to May 2017

Its uniform is similarly different to Sporting CP and Sporting Praia, it only has a green-striped T-shirt and socks and green shorts for home games and a light green T-shirt with black shorts and dark green socks for away/alternate games.

Until May 2017, its away/alternate uniform had a green T-shirt, black shorts and yellow socks.

== Honours ==
- Regional titles:
  - Brava Island League: 4

2014, 2015, 2016, 2017

  - Brava Cup: 1

2016

  - Brava Super Cup: 1

2014

  - Brava Opening Tournament: 3

2013, 2015, 2016/17

- Other title:
  - São Filipe Municipal Tournament: 1

2016

== League and cup history ==
=== National championship ===
Season	Div.	Pos.	Pl.	W	D	L	GS	GA	GD	P	Notes	Playoffs
2014	1A	6	5	0	2	3	3	13	-9	2	Did not advance	Did not participate
2015	1B	5	5	0	1	4	5	16	-11	1	Did not advance	Did not participate
2016	1A	4	5	2	0	3	6	7	-1	6	Did not advance	Did not participate
2017	1C	2-U	6	3	1	2	6	5	+1	10	Did not advance	Did not participate
Total:			21	5	4	12	20	41	-21	19		

2-U: A club who finished second and in the second place ranking, ranked as a non-participant in the playoff stage which the club has been eliminated from

=== Island/Regional Championship ===
Season	Div.	Pos.	Pl.	W	D	L	GS	GA	GD	P	Cup	Tour	Notes
2013–14	2	1	12	10	2	0	39	11	+28	32		Winner	Promoted into the National Championships
2014–15	2	1	12	8	4	0	34	4	+25	28		Not held	Promoted into the National Championships
2015–16	2	1	12	11	1	0	63	6	+57	34	Winner	Winner	Promoted into the National Championships
2016–17	2	1	12	12	0	0	67	7	+60	36	Not held		Promoted into the National Championships
2017–18	2	2	12	10	0	2	44	9	+35	30	In progress		

== Current squad ==
As of 24 February 2017

Note: Flags indicate national team as defined under FIFA eligibility rules; some limited exceptions apply. Players may hold more than one non-FIFA nationality.

No.	Pos.	Nation	Player
1	GK	CPV	Danielson
2	DF	CPV	Ja (Note: Also spelt as Já)
3	DF	CPV	Stive (Note: Not commonly as Stevie)
4	DF	CPV	Elton
5	DF	CPV	Djan (Note: Not often as Jan)
6	DF	CPV	Willy
7	MF	CPV	Djeredja
8	MF	CPV	Jorge
9	MF	CPV	Black
10	MF	CPV	Helder
11	MF	CPV	Nelson

No.	Pos.	Nation	Player
12	MF	CPV	Heta
13	FW	CPV	Chris
14	GK	CPV	Cláudio
15	FW	CPV	Djuca
16	FW	CPV	Ady
17	MF	CPV	Tchalie
18	MF	CPV	Nouno
19	MF	CPV	Douglas
20	MF	CPV	Jota
21	MF	CPV	Maurício
25	MF	CPV	Djicas

== Managerial history ==
- (Cape Verde) Emanuel de Pina (Loco or Ney Loko) – since November 2013

== See also ==
- Other clubs named "Sporting" in Cape Verde:
  - Sporting (Boa Vista Island)
  - Sporting Clube da Praia
  - Sporting Clube do Porto Novo
