= Fufuco =

Cape Verdean footballer (born 1986)

Personal information
- Full name: Antonio Paiva Tavares
- Date of birth: 28 February 1986 (age 40)
- Place of birth: Praia, Cape Verde
- Height: 1.80 m (5 ft 11 in)
- Position: Forward

Senior career*
Years	Team	Apps	(Gls)
–2008	AD Bairro		
2008–2010	Boavista Praia		
2010–2011	Hatta Club		
2011–2012	Hanoi T&T	13	(4)
2012–2013	U.D. Leiria	5	(0)
2013	G.D. Chaves	8	(1)
2013–2014	CD Operário	26	(14)
2014–2015	C.R. Caála		
2015	Domant FC		
2016–2018	Boavista Praia		

International career
2009	Cape Verde	1	(0)
- * Club domestic league appearances and goals

António Paiva Tavares (born 28 February 1986), commonly known as Fufuco, is a former Cape Verdean footballer, who played as a forward. He was capped by Cape Verde once against Equatorial Guinea in 2009.

== Career ==
=== Hanoi T&T ===
Traded to Vietnamese outfit Ha Noi T&T in 2011, Fufuco was known for his enthusiastic attitude from the first day of training, making his debut in the last 20 minutes of a game fronting Thanh Hoa. Even though he hit a hat-trick in a 6–2 beating of HAGL, the Cape Verdean generally underperformed for the club, earning a red card after complaining about having a goal disallowed versus Khanh Hoa. Seen as puerile by many in Vietnam, he spent prodigally on his Vietnamese girlfriend and did not send money home coupled with disappointing league showings which resulted in him leaving the team by 2012.
