= CD Nô Pintcha =

Football club in Cape Verde

Nô Pintcha
- Full name: Clube Desportivo Nô Pintcha
- Founded: March 12, 1975
- Ground: Estádio Aquiles Oliveira; Nova Sintra, Cape Verde
- League: Brava Island League
- 2015–16: 4th

Clube Desportivo Nô Pintcha is a football club in Cape Verde that plays in the Brava Island Division in Cape Verde. It is based in Cidade (then Vila) Nova Sintra the island of Brava.

Nô Pintcha is the most successful football (soccer) club on the island, having won about 13 official regional titles.

== Logo ==
Its logo features a black star with a yellow anchor in the middle and its acronym "CDNP", the first and last two letters on top and bottom and encircled with three words reading "unidade, trabalho, progresso" ("unity, work, progress in Portuguese).

== History ==
Nô Pintcha was founded on March 12, 1975, less than four months before Cape Verde became independent. Their first island title win was in 1994 and was the league's first title and their recent in 2006. They had won eight consecutive titles between 1994 and 2001 and two consecutive titles in 2003 and 2004. The club won the most number of championship titles in the island and also had ten appearances in the national championships. Other than their champ titles, they have three opening tournament (equalling to a league cup in other countries) titles won in 2002, 2004 and recently in 2014.

In their last five appearances at the national championships, the four did not advance above group stage, Nô Pintcha played only two matches in the 1999 season while they were in group B. No success was made in the 2011 season for the club, 5/6 matches were lost, one had a draw which was the 2nd round match with Ultramarina, their worst loss was an 8–0 loss to Botafogo on May 5. Nô Pintcha did better in 2003, they had two wins over Sotavento based teams Académica do Porto Novo and Ultramarina of São Nicolau who were in Group A alongside the club and later finished third. The club finished fourth for the next two seasons, in 2004, the club was in Group B and also had 6 points., their final appearance in 2006 was not successful other than its position, 4/5 matches ended in a loss, the club's last top tier win was on May 21 where they defeated Sporting Porto Novo of Santo Antão South.

In recent years, they finished second for the 2014 season behind Sporting with 26 points, 7 wins and 46 goals scored, their highest to date. For the next two seasons, they finished fourth with 16 points and 5 wins in 2015 and 2016. In 2015, they scored 22 in 2015 and conceded 20. In 2016, they scored 20 and conceded 33. One part, they did not escape conceding high goals as they lost 0–7 to Juventude da Furna at the 9th round, on April 17, the final match of the season, the same result but to Sporting. More than their third of their goalscoring was in a match with Morabeza where they won it 3–8 and was their highest scoring match to date. In the 2017 season, the club finished 3rd with 19 points but scored only 16 goals.

Nô Pintcha started the 2017–18 season with two straight loss before their first win of the season was made on January 11, where they defeated Corôa. Nô Pintcha recently suffered another two matches which ended in losses before their bye round for round 13. Nô Pintcha had 12 points, five less than Benfica's and nine more than Corôas which meant the club finished fifth. Their final challenge of the season was with Académica which ended in a 1–2 victory and ended with 15 points and had 18 goals scored.

== Honours ==
- Brava Island League: 11

1994, 1995, 1996, 1997, 1998, 1999, 2000, 2001, 2003, 2004, 2006

- Brava Island Cup: 1 listed

2010

- Brava Island Opening Tournament: 3

2002, 2004, 2014

== League and cup history ==
=== National championship ===
Season	Div.	Pos.	Pl.	W	D	L	GS	GA	GD	P	Notes	Playoffs
1999	1B	4	2	0	1	1	1	4	-3	1	Did not advance	Did not participate
2001	1	7	6	0	1	5	4	20	-16	1		No playoffs
2003	1A	3	4	2	1	1	4	4	+3	7	Did not advance	Did not participate
2004	1B	4	5	2	0	3	4	10	-6	6	Did not advance	Did not participate
2006	1A	4	4	1	0	3	4	12	-8	3	Did not advance	Did not participate

=== Island/Regional Championship ===
Season	Div.	Pos.	Pl.	W	D	L	GS	GA	GD	P	Cup	Tour	Notes
2002–03	2	1	8	-	-	-	-	-	-	-			Promoted into the National Championships
2003–04	2	1	10	-	-	-	-	-	-	-		Winner	Promoted into the National Championships
2005–06	2	1	10	-	-	-	-	-	-	-			Promoted into the National Championships
2013–14	2	2	12	8	2	2	46	20	+26	26			
2014–15	2	4	12	5	1	6	22	20	+2	16			
2015–16	2	4	12	5	1	6	20	33	-13	16			
2016–17	2	3	12	6	1	5	16	13	+3	19	Not held		
2017–18	2	5	12	5	0	7	18	22	-4	15			

== Statistics ==
- Highest number of points in a season: 7 (national)
- Highest number of goals conceded in a season: 20 (national)
- Worst defeat: Botafogo 8–0 Nô Pintcha, in 2001
