= Brava Island Cup =

- Founded: c. 1981
- Region: Brava, Cape Verde
- Current champions: Sporting Clube da Brava
- Most championships: SC Morabeza?

The Brava Island Cup (Portuguese: Taça (Copa) da Ilha da Brava, Capeverdean Crioulo, ALUPEC or ALUPEK: Tasa da Braba or Tasa dja Braba, Brava Creole: Taça dja Braba) is a regional cup competition and is played during the season in the island of Brava, Cape Verde, it consists of all the clubs from all the two regional divisions and are divided into about four to five rounds, for some seasons, a group stage was featured. The cup competition is organized by the Brava Regional Football Association (Associação Regional do Fogo, ARFB).The cup winner competes in the regional super cup final in the following season when a cup winner also wins the championship, a runner-up competes. The winner qualifies into Cape Verdean Cup, since 2013, it has been canceled due to financial and scheduling reasons. Its last cup winner was Sporting Clube da Brava, the 2016-17 edition was not held.

The first cup competition took place around 1982 with Morabeza winning the title. The cup continued into the 2000s. The 2007 edition was not held, later the regional competitions including the cup were not held for the 2011 season. Its recent cancellation was the 2016-17 season. The 2018 cup season started on March 14.

The upcoming 2018 cup final will feature Morabeza and Sporting Brava.

== Winners ==
Season	Winner	Score	Runner-up
1982	SC Morabeza		
2007	Not held		
2008	Unknown		
2009	Unknown		
2010	SC Morabeza		
2011	Not held		
2012	Juventude da Furna		
2013	Juventude da Furna		
2014	Nô Pintcha		Sporting Clube da Brava
2015-16	Sporting Brava		Académica da Brava
2016-17	Not held		
2018	SC Morabeza	3–3 (4–3 pen)	Sporting Brava

== See also ==
- Brava Island Championships
- Brava Island Super Cup
