= SC Morabeza =

Morabeza
- Full name: Sport Clube Morabeza
- Nickname(s): Morabeza
- Founded: 1980
- Ground: Estádio Aquiles Oliveira; Nova Sintra, Cape Verde
- Capacity: 1000
- Coordinates: 14°51'9"N 24°43'22"W
- Manager: Alfredo Moreira
- League: Brava Island League
- 2021–22: 1th
Home colours	Away colours

Sport Clube Morabeza is a football club in Cape Verde that plays in the Brava Island Division in Cape Verde. It is based in Nova Sintra the island of Brava and plays at Estádio Aquiles de Oliveira where all the clubs from Brava even those based outside the capital play. The club name's etymology is the name predominantly used in Cape Verde and it is used in other music albums and the hotel in the island of Sal. Its current coach is Alfredo Moreira, himself a former player. Together with Sporting, it is Brava's most successful teams.

== History ==
The club was founded in 1980 and was Brava's first club, the club name's etymology is the nickname for Cape Verde Ilhas de morabeza. Morabeza is the Portuguese word for hospitality and Ilhas de morabeza means the "Islands of hospitality"'. Their first appearance was in 1982 and won four straight in 1985.

In 1982, no national championships took place due to the 1982 Amílcar Cabral Cup taking place in Praia's stadium now Estádio da Várzea, they played the first national cup which ended in a loss to São Vicente's CS Mindelense. Later, they had the first three appearances in the national championships, their first was in 1981 or 1982, their fourth straight was in 1985 where club headed to the finals and lost to Sporting Praia. Their first more island titles including their fifth in 1992 and later headed to the nationals, their fifth was in 2005. Their second was in 2005 where they defeated the Longstanding Nô Pintcha who won the most titles, the club was placed in Group B and did not won a match. For their next four appearances, the club only played in the group stage. Again the club was in Group B in 2007 and Morabeza had only two draws with in the last two weeks with Maio's Académica da Calheta and São Nicolau's Ultramarina. In 2008, they were for the third time in Group B and made their first win of the century in the first round where they defeated Santiago North's Estrela dos Amadores 2–0, then they defeated Fogo's Vulcânicos 2–0 in the second round, in the third round, a scoreless draw was made with Boa Vista's Académica Operária, they had the highest point numbering seven. In 2010, after their second consecutive win for the island, the club had their last national appearance and was placed in Group A for the 2010 season, the first match with Boavista was a scoreless draw in the first round, then Morabeza had their only loss with Marítimo do Porto Novo. Morabeza's only win was over Solpontense 3–1 on May 23. The remaining two matches had a goal draw with Batuque and Botafogo.

Recently, their positions was slipping in the last three seasons in 2016, they were 4th in 2014, 5th in 2015, each with only four wins but in the 2016 season Morabeza finished 6th had a win and the club with 10 losses, scored 12 goals and conceded 50 goals.

Morabeza started second for the 2016–17 Brava season with a win over once successful Juventude da Furna, then third, then at the third round second behind Sporting after their win over Benfica. They had their bye week for the fourth round, Sporting defeated Morabeza 1–4 on February 18 and lost a position to fourth along with their chance for another regional title. They returned to third place with a win over Nô Pintcha. On April 2, they defeated Corôa in the 11th round match, Académica scoring a higher match placed Morabeza fourth where they would finish. Their last appearance and win was 4–0 over Corôa on April 24. The unexpected came as Morabeza did not play in a final match against Académica, the region awarded 3–0 against the club. Morabeza had 17 points, 5 wins and 23 goals, fourth ranked in the region.

Morabeza alongside Benfica Brava were the two clubs who played in a special competition known as Taça de Beneficiência (the Beneficence Cup, or the Goodwill Cup), Morabeza won the special title in 2017.

Morabeza got their 16-year wait for another Opening Tournament title for 2017 as the club had 16 points, four more than Sporting Brava, before the final round, though Morabeza played the season's final match with a 7–1 win over Benfica Brava. Morabeza had a bye week at the final round and Morabeza claimed their title for the island, finished three points ahead of Sporting and Morabeza did not lost a single match. Morabeza started off the 2017–18 regional championship season in mid position, before 2017 ended on December 30, they defeated Académica 0–6 and made it the highest scoring match to date on the island. At the third round, Morabeza was still in the lead on the island along with its goal totals of 10 at the third round. Morabeza was goal leader until January 20, 2018, when Sporting took it, a week later on January 28, they lost the first position to Sporting and had 10 points after five matches were played, their goal totals were second in Brava with 10.

Afterwards, they went on a winning legacy in the 2017–18 season which was four straight, first a 5–2 win over Corôa, their recent, an 0–3 win over Benfica, as Sporting lost the match, they retook first place from that club and had 22 points, the club had 25 goals scored, still second behind Sporting. Their winning legacy continued but not alone, Morabeza scored its 30th seasonal goal after their 5–1 win over Nô Pintcha. Morabeza did not play at the 12th round. Morabeza was first up to the 11th round, but after 10 matches, they are second place ailing to win another championship title. Morabeza struggled for a championship title as they defeated Sporting 2–0 at round 13 and got back their first position. Morabeza had one final chance for a championship title and a national participation, they faced Corôa and entirely gained their next title in eight years and will appear at the national championships, they will be in Group B. At the end of the season, they will appear in the Brava Super Cup, they will qualify as champion. Also Morabeza finished with 10 wins and 31 points, the latter after the 2012 expansion to 7 clubs has made a new club record in points, overall their 31 points matches with the 2013 total made by Juventude Furna as fourth in the region behind Sporting Brava's totals of 2014, 2016 and 2017.

In the 2018 Brava Cup, Morabeza headed to the semis and defeated Juventude da Furna 2–1 and will play in the upcoming final.

== Logo and uniform ==
Its logo features a seal with white rim, the rose and the leaves with the short form "SCM" on top and inside the circle with the Island of Brava, the club's location.

Its clothing color is tourmaline-aqua for home matches and blue for away/alternate matches.

== Honours ==
- Brava Island Championships: 10 listed

1982?, 1983, 1984, 1985, 1992, 2005, 2007, 2009, 2010, 2017–18

- Brava Island Cup: 2 listed

1982, 2010

- Brava Opening Tournament: 2

2001, 2017

- Other:
  - Taça da Beneficiência: 1

2017

== League and cup history ==
=== National championship ===
Season	Div.	Pos.	Pl.	W	D	L	GS	GA	GD	P	Cup	Notes	Playoffs
2005	1B	6	5	0	0	5	4	22	-18	0		Did not advance	Did not participate
2007	1A	5	5	0	2	3	3	10	-7	2		Did not advance	Did not participate
2009	1B	3	5	2	1	2	4	8	-4	7		Did not advance	Did not participate
2010	1A	4	5	1	3	1	5	4	+1	6		Did not advance	Did not participate
2018	1B	4	6	1	0	5	4	11	-7	3		Did not advance	Did not participate
Total:			20	3	6	11	16	44	-28	15			

=== Island/Regional Championship ===
Season	Div.	Pos.	Pl.	W	D	L	GS	GA	GD	P	Cup	Tour	Notes
2004–05	2	1	10	7	3	0	23	10	+13	24			Promoted into the National Championships
2006–07	2	1	10	8	0	2	22	11	+11	24			Promoted into the National Championships
2007–09	2	1	10	7	2	1	27	7	+17	23			Promoted into the National Championships
2009–10	2	1	10	-	-	-	-	-	-	-			Promoted into the National Championships
2013–14	2	4	12	4	1	7	23	31	-8	13			
2014–15	2	5	12	4	2	6	17	23	-6	14			
2015–16	2	6	12	1	1	10	12	50	-58	4			
2016–17	2	4	12	5	2	5	23	22	+1	17	Not held		
2017–18	2	1	12	10	1	1	33	8	+25	31	In progress	Winner	To be promoted into the National Championships

== Statistics ==
- Best position: 2nd, Finalist (national)
- Best position at a cup competition: Finalist (national)
- Best position at an opening tournament: 1st
- Best season: 2018 (10 wins, 31 points)
- Total wins: 3 (national)
- Total goals scored: 6 (national)
- Total points: 15 (national)
- Highest number of points in a season:
  - National: 7, in 2009
  - Regional: 31, in 2018
  - Opening Tournament: 16, in 2018
- Highest number of wins in a season:
  - National: 2, in 2009
  - Regional: 10, in 2018
- Highest number of draws in a season: 3 (national), in 2010
- Lowest number of points in a season: 0 (national), in 2005
- Highest number of goals conceded in a season: 22 (national), in 2005
- Highest number of matches lost in a season:
  - National: 5, in 2005
  - Regional: 10, in 2016
- Worst position: 6th (regional), in 2016
- Worst season: 2016 (10 losses)

== Other clubs named Morabeza ==
The Brava club are the only two clubs in Africa and most part of the world that is named Morabeza. The other is a club named Kê Morabeza (also as Ké Morabeza, the club once known as Bela Vista) which is based in the island of São Tomé in São Tomé and Príncipe once known as Bela Vista, that club's named etymology is after hospitality.
