= Brava Island Championships =

Brava Island League
- Founded: c. 1980
- Region: Brava Island, Cape Verde
- Number of clubs: 7
- Promotion to: Cape Verdean Football Championship
- Current champions: Morabeza (12th title) (2024–25)
- Most championships: Nô Pintcha (15 titles)
- Website: Official website

The Brava Island League is a regional championship played in Brava Island, Cape Verde. The championships are organized by Brava Regional Football Association (Associação Regional de Futebol da Brava, ARFB). The winner of the championship plays in the Cape Verdean football Championships of each season.

== History ==
The league was founded around the 1980s. It has the fewest teams in the Capeverdean football or soccer and is also the smallest in area. From 2005 to 2010, it shared the fewest teams with the island of Sal, in 2011, Brava had the 10th fewest clubs until Sal added more clubs in 2014 and put the competition into two divisions.

=== Title history ===
Nô Pintcha has the most number of island titles with 11, Morabeza with 9, Académica and Sporting with two and Corôa and Juventude da Furna with only one title.

The first club to win the island title was Nô Pintcha in 1994 and was eight-time champion in 2001, one of the most to win eight consecutive titles of any island leagues in the country. It was the only club to be champion until 2002 when Académica became the second to win the first title in 2002, Nô Pintcha won two back to back in 2003 and 2004, Morabeza became the third first timer in 2005, Nô Pintcha won their recent in 2006, Morabeza won their second in 2007, Corôa was the fourth first timer in 2008, the second club to win back-to-back titles was Morabeza in 2009. The 2010–11 season held no competition likely due to financial problems, this was the latest cancellation of an island league in the country. Académica won their second and recent in 2012. Two first timers were Juventude in 2013 which is also their only title and Sporting in 2014. Sporting became two-time champion in 2015 and is the most recent victor.

In performance by area, Nova Sintra leads the most with 23 of the 25 titles won based in the town, Académica and Sporting Brava though based in Nova Sintra are the club that serves the whole island. The other two had won a title each, in Nossa Senhora o Monte in 2008 and Furna in 2013.

== Brava Island League – Clubs 2016–17 ==
- Académica (Brava) – (Vila) Nova Sintra
- Benfica (Brava) - (Vila) Nova Sintra
- GD Corôa - Nossa Senhora do Monte
- Juventude da Furna
- Morabeza (Cidade Nova Sintra)
- Nô Pintcha - (Vila) Nova Sintra
- Sporting (Brava) - (Vila) Nova Sintra

== Winners ==
- 1981–82: not known
- 1982–83: Morabeza
- 1983–84: Morabeza
- 1984–85: Morabeza
- 1985–86: not known
- 1986–87: not known
- 1987–88: Nô Pintcha
- 1988–89: Académica
- 1989–90: Nô Pintcha
- 1990–91: Nô Pintcha
- 1991–92: Morabeza
- 1992–93: Nô Pintcha
- 1993–94: Nô Pintcha
- 1994–95: Nô Pintcha
- 1995–96: Nô Pintcha
- 1996–97: Nô Pintcha
- 1997–98: Nô Pintcha
- 1998–99: Nô Pintcha
- 1999–2000: Nô Pintcha
- 2000–01: Nô Pintcha
- 2001–02: Académica
- 2002–03: Nô Pintcha
- 2003–04: Nô Pintcha
- 2004–05: Morabeza
- 2005–06: Nô Pintcha
- 2006–07: Morabeza
- 2007–08: Corôa
- 2008–09: Morabeza
- 2009–10: Morabeza
- 2010–11: not held
- 2011–12: Académica
- 2012–13: Juventude da Furna
- 2013–14: Sporting
- 2014–15: Sporting
- 2015–16: Sporting
- 2016–17: Sporting
- 2017–18: Morabeza
- 2018–19: Sporting
- 2019–20: not awarded due to COVID-19 pandemic
- 2020–21: abandoned due to COVID-19 pandemic
- 2021–22: Morabeza
- 2022–23: Morabeza
- 2023–24: Morabeza
- 2024–25: not held

=== Performance by club ===
Club	Winners	Winning seasons
Nô Pintcha	15	1988, 1990, 1991, 1993, 1994, 1995, 1996, 1997, 1998, 1999, 2000, 2001, 2003, 2004, 2006
Morabeza	12	1983, 1984, 1985, 1992, 2005, 2007, 2009, 2010, 2018, 2022, 2023, 2024
Sporting	5	2014, 2015, 2016, 2017, 2019
Académica	3	1989, 2002, 2012
Corôa	1	2008
Juventude da Furna	1	2013

=== Performance by area ===
Settlement or town	Winners	Winning years
Nova Sintra	34	1983, 1984, 1985, 1988, 1990, 1991, 1992, 1993, 1994, 1995, 1996, 1997, 1998, 1999, 2000, 2001, 2002, 2003, 2004, 2005, 2006, 2007, 2009, 2010, 2012, 2014, 2015, 2016, 2017, 2018, 2019, 2022, 2023, 2024
Nossa Senhora do Monte	1	2008
Furna	1	2013
