= Sports in Fogo, Cape Verde =

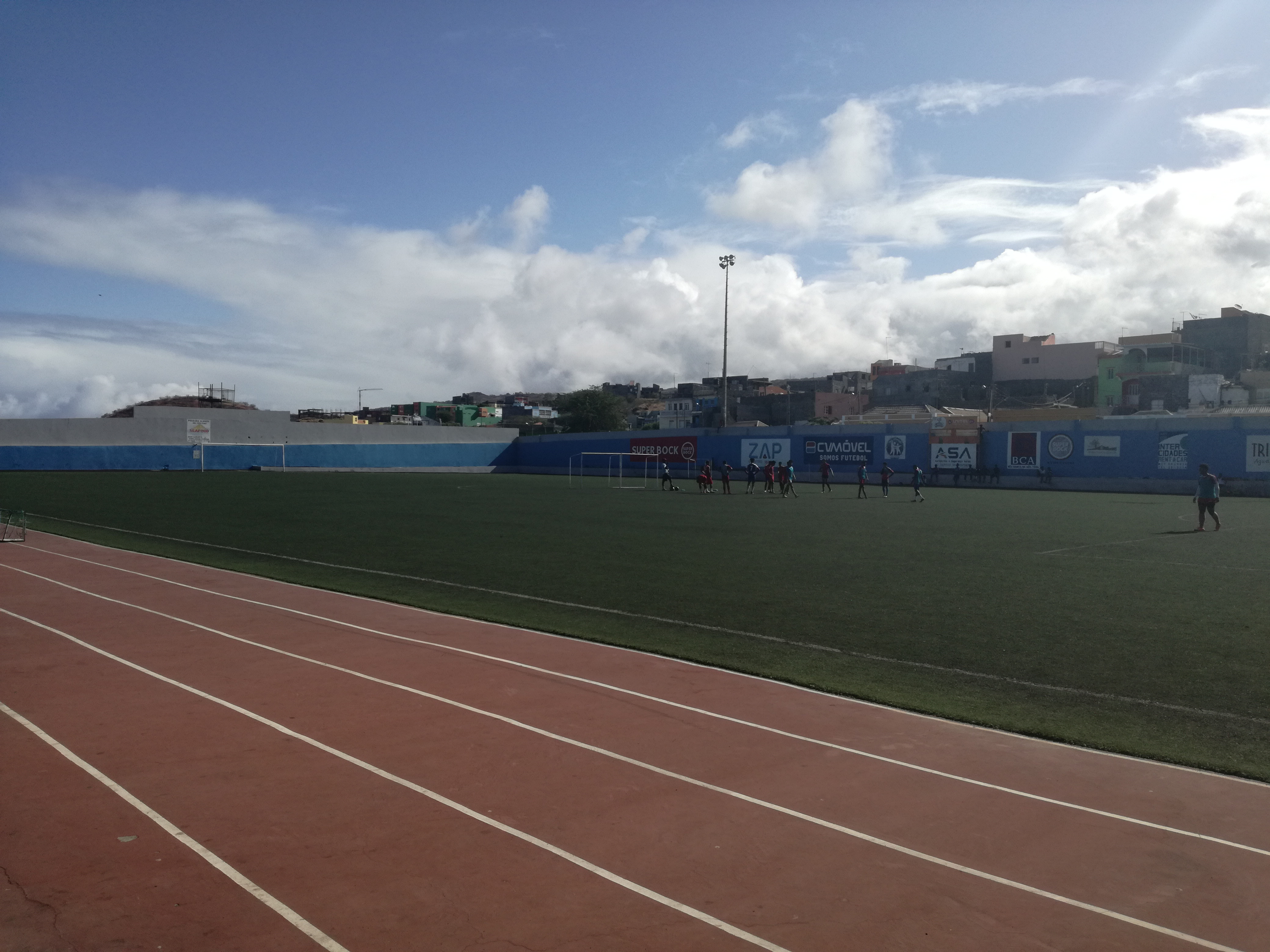
Estádio 5 de Julho, the island's main and most used stadium, home of several top football (soccer) clubs including Académica do Fogo, Botafogo and Vulcânicos, it is also used for athletics

The island of Fogo in Cape Verde in the westcenter of the Sotavento Islands is home to several teams and clubs. The major professional clubs is Botafogo, semi-pro teams includes Académica do Fogo and Vulcânicos, the remainder including the youth club Juventude and Spartak d'Aguadinha are amateur. The football competition was the third along with Sal to have its own first held in 1976 after the nation's independence. From its foundation to 2005, the island had a single league of each sport, it is currently divided into two divisions, the Premier and the Second.

== Football (soccer) ==
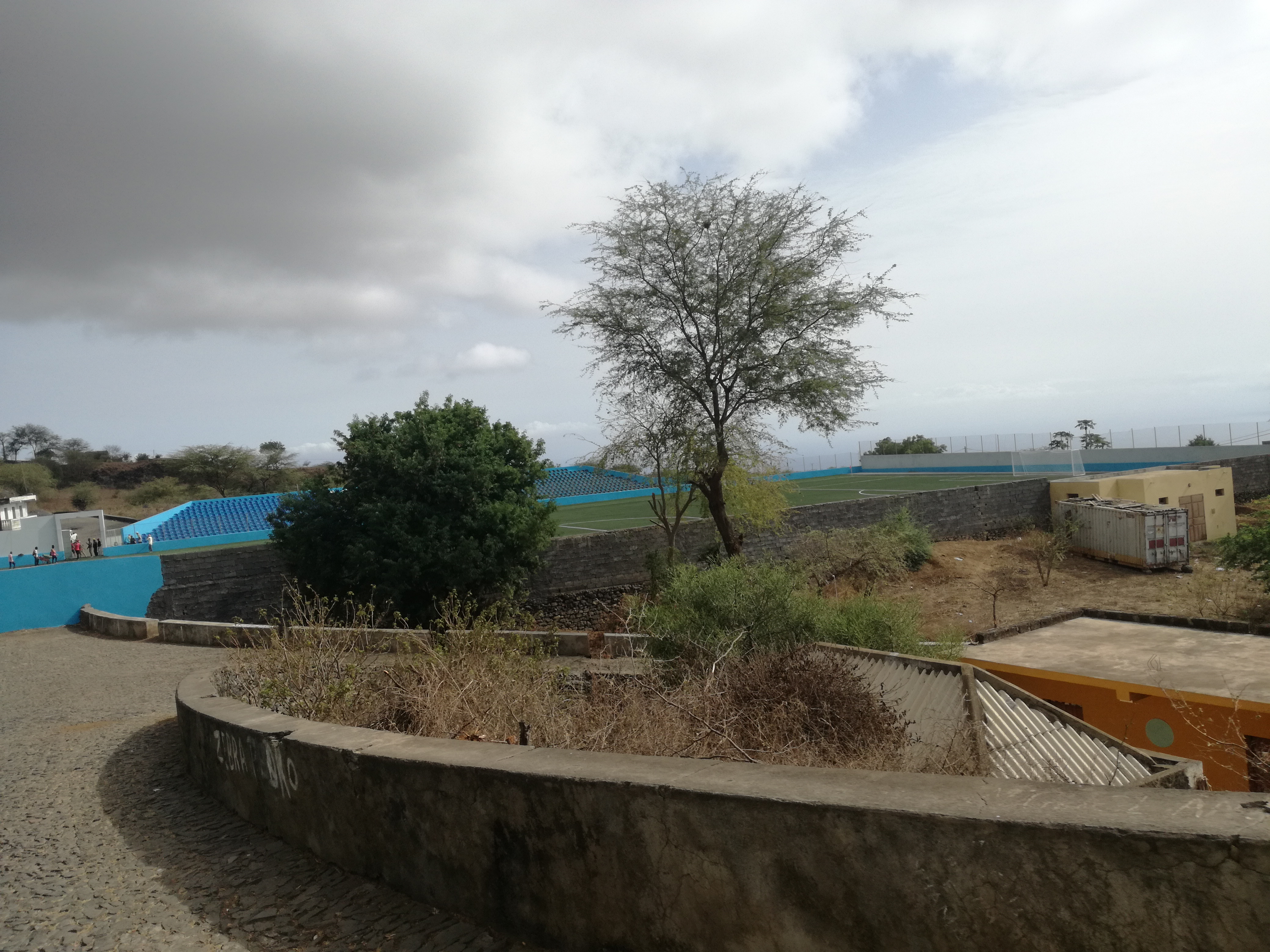
Estádio de São Lourenço, used for Second Division football matches, the other being Monte Pé Largo in Cova Figueira

Football (soccer) remains to be the most popular sport both in the island and the nation. It is governed by the Fogo Regional Football Association, the association has the third most clubs in Cape Verde, though less populated than São Vicente today, but has more registered clubs than that island. The island has 20 football (soccer) club, each has 12 in the Premier and Second Divisions. There is one professional club, two amateur semi-pro clubs, the top three are the most popular clubs in the country.

The oldest football and sports club on the island as well as São Filipe is Vulcânicos founded in July 1953. Académica do Fogo is the second oldest club founded in 1962 and the third oldest is Botafogo founded in 1968. In title numbers, Botafogo is the most successful on the island, Botafogo also won a national title which is the only club from Fogo to do so. Cutelinho may be the first club outside São Filipe to be founded in 1983.

Of the 20 existing clubs, the largest are concentrated in São Filipe numbering seven, around 40% of the island's clubs, 11 all are based in the municipality of São Filipe, more than 50%, 4 are based in Santa Catarina do Fogo and lastly Mosteiros Municipality, of which two are based inside the town.

Since 1976, the winner of the island championships heads to the national championship game each season.

Overall, São Filipe has the most titles won numbering about 60, 13 since the breakup. Tarrafal was the second place to win a title on the island for the South Zone, it is the first in the South Zone, second in the island with seven, Santa Cruz with six and Santa Catarina and São Miguel with a title each.

Also there are two regional cup competitions, super cup competitions in which features a champion and a cup winner (sometimes a second place cup winner when a champion is also a cup winner) and an opening tournament.

== Basketball ==
Basketball is the second most popular sport on the island. Its most popular clubs are Académica do Fogo and Spartak d'Aguadinha. The champion competes in the national basketball championships each season.

Basketball venues include Simão Mendes in the island capital and Luzia Nunes.

== Volleyball ==
Volleyball is another sport in Cape Verde, one of the most popular. Its facilities are at Bila Baixo at São Filipe and probably at Mosteiros' beach.

== Other sports ==
Futsal, athletics, water polo and chess are other sports on the island. Athletics are competed at Estádio 5 de Julho, one of the only on the island. Futsal matches are played at Simão Mendes.

== Sporting events ==
Numerous National Championship finals took place several times at Estádio 5 de Julho. Some Colonial Championships was held at the stadium between 1953 and 1975. The 2002 championship winner Sporting Praia the celebration took place at the stadium. Since the number of final matches was doubled in 2000, each match took place at Várzea from 2004 to 2009, also in 2011 and in 2012. Two national super cup matches took place at the stadium, in 2014 and in 2015.

== Stadium and arenas ==
Stadium	Town / City	Capacity	Type	Tenants	Opened
Estádio 5 de Julho	São Filipe	5,000	Football	Académica do Fogo, Botafogo, Brasilim, Juventude do Fogo, Nova Era, Spartak d'Aguadinha, União de São Lourenço, Valência, Vulcânicos	
Estádio Francisco José Rodrigues	Mosteiros	5,000	Football	Cutelinho, Grito Povo, Nô Pintcha dos Mosteiros	2010
Estádio Monte Pe Largo	Cova Figueira	1,000	Football	Baxada, Desportivo de Cova Figueira, Parque Real	2006
Mendes, Polidesportivo Simão	São Filipe	1,000	Basketball; Volleyball; Futsal	Académica do Fogo, Spartak d'Aguadinha	
Nunes, Polidesportivo Luzia	Luzia Nunes	200	Basketball; Volleyball; Futsal	none	
Estádio de São Lourenço	Curral Grande	1,000	Football	União de São Lourenço	

== See also ==
- Sport in Cape Verde

Sport in other islands:

- Sports in Sal, Cape Verde
- Sports in Santiago, Cape Verde
- Sports in Santo Antão, Cape Verde
- Sports in São Vicente, Cape Verde
