= 2010–11 Fogo Island League =

- Season: 2010–11
- Champions: Vulcânicos
- Promoted: Baxada; Juventude do Fogo
- Relegated: Desportivo de Cova Figueira; Nova Era
- Matches: 90

The 2010–11 Fogo Island League season began on 13 November and finished on 24 April. Vulcânicos won their 9th title and qualified into the 2011 Cape Verdean Football Championships. The championship was organized by the Fogo Regional Football Association (Associação Regional de Futebol do Fogo, ARFF).

Botafogo for the last time was the defending team of the title. A total of 18 clubs participated in the competition, 10 in the Premier Division and 8 in the Second.

Baxada and Juventude were winners of the Second Division while Desportivo de Cova Figueira and Nova Era were relegated into the Second Division for the following season. Cova Figueira has been playing in the Second Division since 2012 but Nova Era did not return until October 2017 into the Premier Division.

== Competing Teams ==
=== Premier Division ===
- Académica do Fogo
- Botafogo (also as Bota Fogo)
- Cutelinho FC
- Luzabril
- Nô Pintcha dos Mosteiros
- Nova Era FC - Terra Branca subdivision, São Filipe
- Spartak d'Aguadinha
- Valência do Fogo
- Vulcânicos

=== Second Division ===
- ABC de Patim
- Baxada
- Brasilim
- Esperança de Achada Furna
- Grito Povo (or Gritu Povu) - Ribeira do Ilhéu
- Juventude do Fogo
- Parque Real - Cova Figueira
- União de São Lourenço

== Table ==
=== Premier Division ===
Pos	Team	Pld	W	D	L	GF	GA	GD	Pts	Qualification or relegation
1	Vulcânicos	18	16	0	2	55	12	+43	48	Qualification for 2011 Cape Verdean Football Championships
2	Spartak d'Aguadinha	18	10	3	5	42	21	+21	33	
3	Académica do Fogo	18	9	5	4	45	26	+19	32	
4	Valência FC do Fogo	18	10	2	6	34	21	+13	32	
5	Cutelinho	18	7	6	5	25	22	+3	27	
6	Botafogo	18	8	2	8	28	22	+6	26	
7	Nô Pintcha dos Mosteiros	18	7	1	10	37	49	−12	22	
8	Luzabril	18	4	4	10	17	38	−21	16	
9	Desportivo de Cova Figueira	18	2	7	9	26	45	−19	13	Divisional decisional match
10	Nova Era	18	2	0	16	16	69	−53	6	Relegation to Segundona

Updated to match(es) played on 24 April 2011. Source: RSSSF
Rules for classification: 1) points; 2) goal difference; 3) number of goals scored.

2010-11 Fogo Zone Premier Division Champions
Vulcânicos
9th title

=== Second Division ===
- 1st: Baxada
- 2nd: Juventude do Fogo
