= 2013–14 Fogo Island League =

Fogo Island League
- Season: 2013-14
- Champions: Académica do Fogo
- Runner up: Cutelinho
- Promoted: Baxada; Parque Real
- Relegated: Juventude; Grito Povo
- Matches played: 90
- Goals scored: 310 (3.44 per match)
- Biggest home win: Académica Fogo
- Biggest away win: Académica Fogo

The 2013-14 Fogo Island League season was the competition of the second and third tiers of football on the island of Fogo, Cape Verde. It started on November 23, 2013 and finished on March 30, 2014. The tournament was organized by the Fogo Regional Football Association (Associação Regional de Futebol de Santiago Sul, ARFF). Académica Fogo won the 13th title, it was also the club's last title won.

== Overview ==
Académica Fogo was the defending team of the title. A total of 20 clubs participated in the competition, 10 in each division. Clubs based in the municipalities of São Filipe and Santa Catarina do Fogo were played at Estádio 5 de Julho, while clubs based in Mosteiros Municipality were played at Estádio Francisco José Rodrigues. Matches in Mosteiros were played each Saturday, sometimes with two matches, while the Second Division matches in Mosteiros featuring Atlético were played each Sunday.

A total of 310 goals were scored, the largest of any scored in any island league. The largest win was Académica do Fogo, who scored 8-1 over Grito Povo on November 30, 2013. It was also the club that scored 7-0 over União São Lourenço on February 23, 2014. It was also the club that won away 1-7 over União São Lourenço on December 15, 2013. It would be the next club in years to win a team home and away with a larger number of goals against a single team in Cape Verde, with the same high number being 7.

Juventude finished last, and along with Grito Povo, they were relegated. Juventude returned for the 2015-16 season. Baxada and Parque Real were leaders in the Second Division. Parque Real defeated Grito Povo in its divisional decisional matches. Baxada spent the next three seasons in that division, while Parque Real were relegated in the following season.

Botafogo took the lead in its first week, then Académica for the rest of the season, with the exception of weeks 5 to 7, where Nô Pintcha took it for a week, and Spartak d'Aguadinha for two weeks.

Académica Fogo scored the most, numbering 59, in 9th place. Grito Povo scored the least, with 21. Also, Académica conceded the least, numbering 15, and Grito Povo the most, numbering 51. Both Desportivo and Travadores scored the most goals, numbering 37; Sporting was second with 36; and Vitòria scored the least, numbering 12. The club that scored the least was in 5th place. Varanda conceded the most goals, numbering 37, followed by Tchadense with 24 and Vitòria with 32. The club that conceded the most was in 5th place.

There were no competitions on the last week of December, the first week of January due to the regional cup competitions.

== Participating clubs ==
=== Premier Division ===
- Académica do Fogo
- Botafogo FC
- Cutelinho FC - Mosteiros
- Juventude
- Grito Povo - Ribeira do Ilhéu
- Nô Pintcha - Mosteiros
- Spartak D'Aguadinha
- União de São Lourenço
- Valência - As Hortas
- Vulcânicos

=== Second Division ===
- ABC de Patim
- Atlântico - São Filipe
- Atlético - Mosteiros
- Baxada - Cova Figueira
- Brasilim - Monte Urca
- Esperança - Achada Furna
- Luzabril - Luzia Nunes
- Nova Era
- Parque Real - Cova Figueira

== League standings ==
=== Premier Division ===
| Pos | Team | Pld | W | D | L | GF | GA | GD | Pts |
|---|---|---|---|---|---|---|---|---|---|
| 1 | Académica do Fogo | 18 | 13 | 3 | 2 | 59 | 15 | +44 | 42 |
| 2 | Cutelinho | 18 | 11 | 3 | 4 | 41 | 22 | +19 | 36 |
| 3 | Botafogo FC | 18 | 10 | 2 | 6 | 26 | 21 | +5 | 32 |
| 4 | Nô Pintcha | 18 | 9 | 5 | 4 | 25 | 18 | +7 | 32 |
| 5 | Spartak D'Aguadinha | 18 | 8 | 7 | 3 | 35 | 27 | +8 | 31 |
| 6 | Valência | 18 | 9 | 3 | 6 | 33 | 26 | +7 | 30 |
| 7 | Vulcânicos | 18 | 3 | 5 | 10 | 22 | 31 | −9 | 14 |
| 8 | União de São Lourenço | 18 | 4 | 2 | 12 | 22 | 49 | −27 | 14 |
| 9 | Grito Povo | 18 | 4 | 1 | 13 | 21 | 51 | −30 | 13 |
| 10 | Juventude | 18 | 3 | 1 | 14 | 26 | 50 | −24 | 10 |

=== Second Division ===
- 1st: Baxada
- 2nd: Parque Real
- 4th: Desportivo de Cova Figueira

== Results ==
Week 1
| Home | Score | Visitor | Date |
|---|---|---|---|
| Valência | 0 - 1 | Nô Pintcha | 23 November |
| União São Lourenço | 0 - 1 | Spartak | 23 November |
| Cutelinho | 2 - 2 | Vulcânico | 23 November |
| Grito Povo | 0 - 3 | Botafogo | 23 November |
| Juventude | 1 - 3 | Académica Fogo | 24 November |

Week 2
| Home | Score | Visitor | Date |
|---|---|---|---|
| Académica Fogo | 8 - 1 | Grito Povo | 30 November |
| Vulcânico | 1 - 1 | União São Lourenço | 30 November |
| Nô Pintcha | 1 - 0 | Spartak | 30 November |
| Botafogo | 3 - 1 | Juventude | 1 December |
| Valência | 1 - 3 | Cutelinho | 1 December |

Week 3
| Home | Score | Visitor | Date |
|---|---|---|---|
| Spartak | 3 - 0 | Cutelinho | 7 December |
| Juventude | 1 - 4 | Valência | 7 December |
| Nô Pintcha | 1 - 1 | Vulcânico | 7 December |
| Grito Povo | 1 - 2 | União São Lourenço | 7 December |
| Académica Fogo | 1 - 0 | Botafogo | 8 December |

Week 4
| Home | Score | Visitor | Date |
|---|---|---|---|
| Juventude | 1 - 3 | Nô Pintcha | 14 December |
| Botafogo | 1 - 3 | Cutelinho | 14 December |
| Grito Povo | 1 - 4 | Valência | 14 December |
| União São Lourenço | 0 - 7 | Académica Fogo | 15 December |
| Vulcânico | 1 - 1 | Spartak | 15 December |

Week 5
| Home | Score | Visitor | Date |
|---|---|---|---|
| Juventude | 3 - 1 | Grito Povo | 21 December |
| Cutelinho | 4 - 2 | União São Lourenço | 21 December |
| Nô Pintcha | 2 - 1 | Académica Fogo | 21 December |
| Valência | 2 - 1 | Vulcânico | 22 December |
| Botafogo | 0 - 1 | Spartak | 15 December |

Week 6
| Home | Score | Visitor | Date |
|---|---|---|---|
| Vulcânico | 2 - 0 | Grito Povo | 11 January |
| Botafogo | 2 - 0 | Nô Pintcha | 11 January |
| Spartak | 3 - 2 | Académica Fogo | 12 January |
| União São Lourenço | 0 - 4 | Valência | 12 January |
| Cutelinho | 3 - 2 | Juventude | 12 January |

Week 7
| Home | Score | Visitor | Date |
|---|---|---|---|
| Spartak | 4 - 3 | Grito Povo | 18 January |
| União São Lourenço | 2 - 1 | Juventude | 18 January |
| Cutelinho | 1 - 1 | Nô Pintcha | 18 January |
| Botafogo | 2 - 0 | Valência | 19 January |
| Académica Fogo | 2 - 1 | Vulcânico | 19 January |

Week 8
| Home | Score | Visitor | Date |
|---|---|---|---|
| União São Lourenço | 1 - 1 | Botafogo | 25 January |
| Académica Fogo | 1 - 0 | Cutelinho | 25 January |
| Nô Pintcha | 2 - 0 | Grito Povo | 25 January |
| Vulcânico | 2 - 1 | Juventude | 26 January |
| Spartak | 1 - 1 | Valência | 26 January |

Week 9
| Home | Score | Visitor | Date |
|---|---|---|---|
| Valência | 1 - 3 | Académica Fogo | 1 February |
| Botafogo | 2 - 0 | Vulcânico | 1 February |
| Cutelinho | 3 - 0 | Grito Povo | 1 February |
| Nô Pintcha | 4 - 2 | União São Lourenço | 1 February |
| Juventude | 2 - 2 | Spartak | 2 February |

Week 10
| Home | Score | Visitor | Date |
|---|---|---|---|
| Nô Pintcha | 2 - 0 | Valência | 8 February |
| Spartak | 2 - 1 | União São Lourenço | 8 February |
| Académica Fogo | 5 - 0 | Juventude | 8 February |
| Vulcânico | 1 - 2 | Cutelinho | 9 February |
| Botafogo | 1 - 2 | Grito Povo | 9 February |

Week 11
| Home | Score | Visitor | Date |
|---|---|---|---|
| Spartak | 2 - 2 | Nô Pintcha | 12 February |
| União São Lourenço | 1 - 3 | Vulcânico | 12 February |
| Grito Povo | 0 - 3 | Académica Fogo | 12 February |
| Cutelinho | 2 - 1 | Valência | 12 February |
| Juventude | 2 - 3 | Botafogo | 13 February |

Week 12
| Home | Score | Visitor | Date |
|---|---|---|---|
| Vulcânico | 0 - 0 | Nô Pintcha | 15 February |
| Valência | 3 - 2 | Juventude | 15 February |
| Cutelinho | 2 - 1 | Spartak | 15 February |
| União São Lourenço | 5 - 2 | Grito Povo | 16 February |
| Botafogo | 0 - 3 | Académica Fogo | 16 February |

Week 13
| Home | Score | Visitor | Date |
|---|---|---|---|
| Valência | 4 - 3 | Grito Povo | 22 February |
| Nô Pintcha | 2 - 0 | Juventude | 22 February |
| Cutelinho | 0 - 1 | Botafogo | 22 February |
| Académica Fogo | 7 - 0 | União São Lourenço | 23 February |
| Spartak | 4 - 3 | Vulcânico | 23 February |

Week 14
| Home | Score | Visitor | Date |
|---|---|---|---|
| União São Lourenço | 0 - 5 | Cutelinho | 1 March |
| Académica Fogo | 3 - 1 | Nô Pintcha | 1 March |
| Grito Povo | 3 - 2 | Juventude | 1 March |
| Vulcânico | 1 - 2 | Valência | 2 March |
| Spartak | 2 - 2 | Botafogo | 2 March |

Week 15
| Home | Score | Visitor | Date |
|---|---|---|---|
| Juventude | 1 - 4 | Cutelinho | 8 March |
| Grito Povo | 1 - 0 | Vulcânico | 8 March |
| Nô Pintcha | 1 - 2 | Botafogo | 8 March |
| Académica Fogo | 1 - 1 | Spartak | 9 March |
| Valência | 2 - 0 | União São Lourenço | 9 March |

Week 16
| Home | Score | Visitor | Date |
|---|---|---|---|
| Valência | 2 - 0 | Botafogo | 15 March |
| Juventude | 2 - 1 | União São Lourenço | 15 March |
| Grito Povo | 3 - 1 | Spartak | 15 March |
| Nô Pintcha | 2 - 0 | Cutelinho | 15 March |
| Vulcânico | 0 - 5 | Académica Fogo | 16 March |

Week 17
| Home | Score | Visitor | Date |
|---|---|---|---|
| Botafogo | 2 - 1 | União São Lourenço | 22 March |
| Cutelinho | 3 - 3 | Académica Fogo | 22 March |
| Grito Povo | 0 - 0 | Nô Pintcha | 22 March |
| Juventude | 3 - 2 | Vulcânico | 23 March |
| Valência | 2 - 2 | Spartak | 23 March |

Week 18
| Home | Score | Visitor | Date |
|---|---|---|---|
| Académica Fogo | 1 - 1 | Valência | 29 March |
| Vulcânico | 0 - 1 | Botafogo | 29 March |
| Grito Povo | 0 - 4 | Cutelinho | 29 March |
| União São Lourenço | 3 - 0 | Nô Pintcha | 30 March |
| Spartak | 4 - 1 | Juventude | 30 March |

== Position changes ==
| Team ╲ Round | 1 | 2 | 3 | 4 | 5 | 6 | 7 | 8 | 9 | 10 | 11 | 12 | 13 | 14 | 15 | 16 | 17 | 18 |
|---|---|---|---|---|---|---|---|---|---|---|---|---|---|---|---|---|---|---|
| Académica do Fogo | 2 | 1 | 1 | 1 | 2 | 4 | 2 | 1 | 1 | 1 | 1 | 1 | 1 | 1 | 1 | 1 | 1 | 1 |
| Botafogo | 1 | 2 | 3 | 6 | 6 | 6 | 6 | 6 | 5 | 5 | 5 | 5 | 5 | 5 | 5 | 6 | 5 | 3 |
| Cutelinho | 5 | 4 | 6 | 4 | 4 | 2 | 3 | 4 | 4 | 4 | 3 | 2 | 3 | 2 | 2 | 2 | 2 | 2 |
| Juventude | 9 | 9 | 9 | 9 | 9 | 9 | 9 | 9 | 9 | 9 | 9 | 9 | 9 | 10 | 10 | 10 | 10 | 10 |
| Grito Povo | 10 | 10 | 10 | 10 | 10 | 10 | 10 | 10 | 10 | 10 | 10 | 10 | 10 | 9 | 9 | 8 | 8 | 9 |
| Nô Pintcha | 3 | 3 | 2 | 2 | 1 | 3 | 4 | 3 | 2 | 2 | 2 | 3 | 2 | 3 | 3 | 3 | 3 | 4 |
| Spartak D'Aguadinha | 4 | 5 | 4 | 3 | 3 | 1 | 1 | 2 | 3 | 3 | 4 | 4 | 4 | 4 | 4 | 5 | 6 | 5 |
| União São Lourenço | 7 | 7 | 5 | 8 | 8 | 8 | 8 | 8 | 8 | 8 | 8 | 8 | 8 | 8 | 8 | 9 | 9 | 8 |
| Valência | 8 | 8 | 7 | 5 | 5 | 5 | 5 | 5 | 6 | 6 | 6 | 6 | 6 | 6 | 6 | 4 | 4 | 6 |
| Vulcânicos | 6 | 6 | 8 | 7 | 7 | 7 | 7 | 7 | 7 | 7 | 7 | 7 | 7 | 7 | 7 | 7 | 7 | 7 |

2013-14 Fogo Island Premier Division Champions
Académica do Fogo
13th title

== Statistics ==
- Biggest win:

Académica (Fogo) 8-1 Grito Povo (November 30, 2013)
União São Lourenço 1-7 Académica Fogo (December 15, 2013)

- Most differences in number of goals:

Académica Fogo 7-0 União São Lourenço

- Longest number one streak: Académica Fogo (weeks 8-18)
- Longest last place streak: Grito Povo (weeks 1-13)
