= Fogo Champion's Cup =

Fogo Champion's Cup Fogo Champion's Trophy
- Founded: 2016
- Region: Fogo Island, Cape Verde
- Teams: 2
- Current champions: Vulcânicos FC (1st time)

The Fogo Champion's Cup or the Fogo Champion's Trophy (Portuguese: Taça da Campeões do Fogo, Capeverdean Creole: ALUPEK: Tasa da Kampionis du Fugu) is a single knockout football (soccer) competition that is played each season in the island of Fogo, Cape Verde. The competition features the champion from the Premier Division and the champion of the Second Division. The trophy competition is organized by the Fogo Regional Football Association (Associação Regional do Fogo, ARFF). Its current winner is Onze Unidos who won their only title.

The Champion's Cup (or Trophy) was introduced in 2016. The first edition took place in November, 2016 and featured Vulcânicos (Premier Division) and Real Marítimo (Second Division) which were the first club to participate. The 2017 edition which featured the Premier Division champ Vulcânicos and the Second Division champ Nova Era was not played as the Second Division club did not shown up.

== Winners ==
Premier Division Champion
Second Division Champion

Season	Winner	Score	Runner-up
2016	Vulcânicos		ABC de Patim
2017	Vulcânicos	N/P	Nova Era

== See also ==
- Fogo Premier Division
- Fogo Second Division
- Fogo Island Cup
- Fogo Super Cup
- Fogo Opening Tournament
