= 2014–15 Fogo Island League =

Fogo Island League
- Season: 2014-15
- Champions: Spartak d'Aguadinha
- Runner up: Académica do Fogo
- Promoted: Juventude
- Relegated: Parque Real
- Matches: 90
- Goals: 412 (4.58 per match)
- Biggest home win: Spartak d'Aguadinha
- Biggest away win: Botafogo; Cutelinho; Valência

The 2014-15 Fogo Island League season was the competition of the second and third tier football in the island of Fogo, Cape Verde. It started on 15 November 2014 and finished on 19 April 2015. The tournament was organized by the Fogo Regional Football Association (Associação Regional do Fogo de Futebol, ARFF). Spartak d'Aguadinha won the first title and competed for the first time in the Cape Verdean National Championships in May.

== Overview ==
Académica Fogo was the defending team of the title. A total of 18 clubs participated in the competition, 10 in the Premier Division and 8 in the Second Division. Clubs based in the municipalities of São Filipe and Santa Catarina do Fogo were played at Estádio 5 de Julho while clubs based in Mosteiros Municipality were played at Estádio Francisco José Rodrigues each Saturday at 16:00. Second Division matches in Mosteiros featuring Grito Povo were played on Sunday

The football (soccer) calendar started on October 1 and was completed on November 1 in São Filipe and determined the ordering, the date and time of the matches.

Académica do Fogo had the number one spot for most of the time, Valência took the number on spot in week 3 and Spartak d'Aguadinha took it in weeks 4 & 5 and the final two weeks and headed to win their very first title and their entry into the national championships.

=== Delay due to the eruption ===
The league was delayed when Pico do Fogo erupted, it would resume on 14 December and matches were rescheduled from November 22. In late November, volcanic clouds hovered the north of the island, at the end of the month especially Patim, Salto and Achada Furna where the clubs are based and they could not train in its fields and a bit of the area around Cova Figueira, it headed north, in early December, it was hovered south again, it was not far from the island capital and its matches could not play, it hovered over Mosteiros' stadium. The league resumed on 14 December with the match Spartak against Académica do Fogo, when the volcano was less active. Some of the breaks lasting two or three weeks in 2015 due to the regional cup were removed and many of its rounds were rescheduled. the Fogo Regional Cup for the 2015 season was probably cancelled. The National Championships in May were not cancelled.

=== Another delay ===
The match between Académica do Fogo and Cutelinho which was for January 11 was postponed due to the sinking of the Vicente ferry on 8 January 2015 with the loss of 15 people, one of them, a player of Académica do Fogo. The match was rescheduled to January 13.

=== Final results ===
A total of 412 goals were scored, the largest of any scored in any island league in the season and all time in Cape Verde for a year, the 2015-16 Santiago North Premier Division superseded with 545. The largest win was Spartak who scored 12-0 over União São Lourenço on 12 April 2015, some matches won by large points and the most ever of any island league of all time in the country, it had the most matches finishing with 9 points, most of the matches featured Parque Real and lost each of them, others would finish with 7 and 8 points. It had the largest number of the highest away win with three matches finishing with 9 points. Also Spartak scored the most numbering 73, Académica conceded the least numbering nine.

Juventude won the second division for the 2014/15 season and will again return during the 2015-16 season. União de São Lourenço was placed 9th and challenged the promotional matches and defeated ABC de Patim 1-0 in the first match, the second match was tied 1 apiece, with a total of two goals scored, they remain in the premier division while ABC de Patim remains in the second division. Last placed Parque Real was relegated and the club only had a victory and conceded a huge 104 goals, a 90 difference to 14 goals they scored, the most of any club in Cape Verde and is currently participating in the island's second division.

== Participating clubs ==
=== Premier Division ===
- Académica do Fogo
- Baxada - Cova Figueira
- Botafogo FC
- Cutelinho FC
- Nô Pintcha
- Parque Real - Cova Figueira
- Spartak D'Aguadinha
- União de São Lourenço
- Valência
- Vulcânicos

=== Information about the clubs (Premier Division) ===
Club	Location	Stadium	2013-14 positions
Académica do Fogo	São Filipe	Estádio 5 de Julho	Champion of the Premier Division
Baxada	Cova Figueira	Estádio Francisco José Rodrigues	Second Division
Botafogo	São Filipe	Estádio 5 de Julho	3rd in the Premier Division
Cutelinho	Mosteiros	Estádio Francisco José Rodrigues	2nd in the Premier Division
Nô Pintcha	Mosteiros	Estádio Francisco José Rodrigues	4th in the Premier Division
Parque Real		Estadio 5 de Julho	Second Division
Spartak d'Aguadinha	São Filipe	Estádio 5 de Julho	5th in the Premier Division
União de Sāo Lourenço	São Lourenço parish	Estádio 5 de Julho	8th in the Premier Division
Valência	Sã Filipe	Estádio 5 de Julho	6th in the Premier Division
Vulcânicos	São Filipe	Estádio 5 de Julho	7th in the Premier Division

=== Second Division ===
- ABC de Patim
- Atlântico
- Atlético
- Brasilim
- Esperança
- Grito Povo
- Juventude
- Luzabril
- Nova Era

== League standings ==
=== Premier Division ===
Pos	Team	Pld	W	D	L	GF	GA	GD	Pts
1	Spartak d'Aguadinha	18	14	2	2	73	23	+50	44
2	Académica do Fogo	18	13	3	2	52	9	+43	42
3	Cutelinho	18	11	2	5	49	23	+26	35
4	Botafogo	18	10	4	4	55	20	+35	34
5	Vulcânicos	18	8	6	4	46	22	+24	30
6	Valência	18	7	3	8	37	39	−2	24
7	Nô Pintcha	18	6	3	9	41	46	−5	21
8	Baxada	18	3	2	13	26	65	−39	11
9	União de São Lourenço	18	3	0	15	19	61	−42	9
10	Parque Real	18	1	3	14	14	104	−90	6

=== Second Division ===
The second division was divided into two groups, the top two of each advanced up to semis, then one club into the finals, the winner advances into the regional Premier Division and the second place competes in the division decisional match where they promote into the Premier Division or remain into the Second Division.

The top two clubs were:

- 1st: Juventude
- 2nd: ABC de Patim, challenged with União de São Lourenço and lost with a total of 1 point, remains in the second division

== Results ==
Week 1
Home	Score	Visitor	Date	Time
Académica Fogo	7 - 0	Parque Real	15 November	14:00
Vulcânico	5 - 1	União São Lourenço	15 November	16:00
Botafogo	2 - 0	Cutelinho	16 November	14:00
Baxada	2 - 3	Valência	16 November	16:00
Nô Pintcha	0 - 2	Spartak	15 November	16:00

Week 2
Home	Score	Visitor	Date	Time
Valência	2 - 2	Parque Real	22 November	14:00
Botafogo	0 - 0	Vulcânico	22 November	16:00
Baxada	7 - 1	Nô Pintcha	17 December^{N1}	(Note: Originally for 14:00)
Spartak	1 - 1	Académica Fogo	14 December^{N1}	(Note: Originally for 16:00)
Cutelinho	4 - 0	União São Lourenço	22 November	16:00
Note 1: The Sunday Matches were suspended due to the volcanic eruption in the northeast of the island.

Week 3
Home	Score	Visitor	Date	Time
Spartak	2 - 1	Cutelinho	20 December	14:00
Parque Real	2 - 2	Baxada	20 December	16:00
Vulcânico	1 - 1	Académica Fogo	29 December	14:00
Valência	3 - 1	União São Lourenço	29 December	16:00
Nô Pintcha	3 - 3	Botafogo	20 December	16:00

Week 4
Home	Score	Visitor	Date	Time
Spartak	2 - 0	Valência	10 January	14:00
Vulcânico	3 - 2	Nô Pintcha	10 January	16:00
Botafogo	10 - 1	Baxada	11 January	14:00
União São Lourenço	2 - 1	Parque Real	11 January	16:00
Cutelinho	1 - 3	Académica Fogo	13 January^{N2}	
Note 2: The game was postponed due to the sinking of the boat Vicente which carried a player of Académica do Fogo and a child.

Week 5
Home	Score	Visitor	Date	Time
Botafogo	3 - 0	União São Lourenço	17 January	14:00
Baxada	0 - 6	Académica Fogo	17 January	16:00
Spartak	2 - 1	Vulcânico	18 January	14:00
Parque Real	0 - 9	Cutelinho	18 January	16:00
Nô Pintcha	1 - 1	Valência	17 January	16:00

Week 6
Home	Score	Visitor	Date	Time
Académica Fogo	2 - 0	Valência	24 January	14:00
Spartak	1 - 3	Botafogo	24 January	16:00
União São Lourenço	4 - 6	Nô Pintcha	25 January	14:00
Vulcânico	9 - 0	Parque Real	25 January	16:00
Cutelinho	2 - 1	Baxada	24 January	16:00

Week 7
Home	Score	Visitor	Date	Time
Vulcânico	4 - 2	Baxada	31 January	14:00
Académica Fogo	1 - 0	Botafogo	31 January	16:00
União São Lourenço	1 - 8	Spartak	1 February	14:00
Valência	3 - 2	Cutelinho	1 February	16:00
Nô Pintcha	3 - 0	Parque Real	31 January	16:00

Week 8
Home	Score	Visitor	Date	Time
Académica Fogo	2 - 0	Nô Pintcha	7 February	14:00
Valência	2 - 1	Botafogo	7 February	16:00
Parque Real	0 - 8	Spartak	8 February	14:00
União São Lourenço	0 - 1	Baxada	8 February	16:00
Cutelinho	0 - 1	Vulcânico	7 February	16:00

Week 9
Home	Score	Visitor	Date	Time
Vulcânico	5 - 0	Valência	14 February	14:00
Baxada	1 - 5	Spartak	14 February	16:00
Parque Real	0 - 9	Botafogo	15 February	14:00
Académica Fogo	3 - 0	União São Lourenço	15 February	16:00
Nô Pintcha	1 - 2	Cutelinho	14 February	16:00

Week 10
Home	Score	Visitor	Date	Time
Parque Real	2 - 8	Académica Fogo	21 February	14:00
União São Lourenço	2 - 1	Vulcânico	21 February	16:00
Spartak	6 - 4	Nô Pintcha	22 February	14:00
Valência	1 - 2	Baxada	22 February	16:00
Cutelinho	3 - 2	Botafogo	21 February	16:00

Week 11
Home	Score	Visitor	Date	Time
Parque Real	0 - 9	Valência	28 February	14:00
Vulcânico	1 - 1	Botafogo	28 February	16:00
União São Lourenço	1 - 5	Cutelinho	1 March	14:00
Académica Fogo	3 - 0	Spartak	1 March	16:00
Nô Pintcha	2 - 0	Baxada	28 February	16:00

Week 12
Home	Score	Visitor	Date	Time
Botafogo	3 - 1	Nô Pintcha	7 March	14:00
Baxada	1 - 1	Parque Real	7 March	16:00
Académica Fogo	1 - 0	Vulcânico	8 March	14:00
União São Lourenço	1 - 2	Valência	8 March	16:00
Cutelinho	3 - 3	Spartak	8 March	16:00

Week 13
Home	Score	Visitor	Date	Time
Académica Fogo	0 - 2	Cutelinho	14 March	14:00
Valência	1 - 3	Spartak	14 March	16:00
Baxada	1 - 4	Botafogo	15 March	14:00
Parque Real	2 - 0	União São Lourenço	15 March	16:00
Nô Pintcha	1 - 1	Vulcânico	14 March	16:00

Week 14
Home	Score	Visitor	Date	Time
União São Lourenço	0 - 3	Botafogo	21 March	14:00
Académica Fogo	3 - 0	Baxada	21 March	16:00
Vulcânico	2 - 3	Spartak	22 March	14:00
Valência	5 - 1	Nô Pintcha	22 March	16:00
Cutelinho	6 - 1	Parque Real	14 March	16:00

Week 15
Home	Score	Visitor	Date	Time
Valência	1 - 7	Académica Fogo	28 March	14:00
Botafogo	1 - 2	Spartak	28 March	16:00
Baxada	2 - 3	Cutelinho	29 March	14:00
Parque Real	0 - 3	Vulcânico	29 March	16:00
Nô Pintcha	6 - 2	União São Lourenço	28 March	16:00

Week 16
Home	Score	Visitor	Date	Time
Baxada	3 - 6	Vulcânico	4 April	14:00
Botafogo	0 - 0	Académica Fogo	4 April	16:00
Spartak	4 - 1	União São Lourenço	5 April	14:00
Parque Real	1 - 8	Nô Pintcha	5 April	16:00
Cutelinho	1 - 0	Valência	4 April	16:00

Week 17
Home	Score	Visitor	Date	Time
Vulcânico	1 - 1	Cutelinho	11 April	14:00
Botafogo	4 - 2	Valência	11 April	16:00
Spartak	12 - 0	Parque Real	12 April	14:00
Baxada	0 - 3	União São Lourenço	12 April	16:00
Nô Pintcha	1 - 0	Académica Fogo	11 April	16:00

Week 18
Home	Score	Visitor	Date	Time
Valência	2 - 2	Vulcânico	18 April	14:00
Spartak	9 - 0	Baxada	18 April	16:00
Botafogo	6 - 2	Parque Real	19 April	14:00
União São Lourenço	0 - 4	Académica Fogo	19 April	16:00
Cutelinho	4 - 0	Nô Pintcha	18 April	16:00

Promotional matches
Home	Score	Visitor	Date
União São Lourenzo	1 - 0	ABC de Patim	26 June
ABC de Patim	1 - 1	União São Lourenzo	3 July
União de São Lourenzo remains in the premier division

== Position changes ==
Team ╲ Round	1	2	3	4	5	6	7	8	9	10	11	12	13	14	15	16	17	18
Académica do Fogo	1	1	3	3	2	1	1	1	1	1	1	1	1	1	1	1	2	2
Baxada	6	6	6	6	7	8	8	8	8	7	8	8	8	8	8	8	8	8
Botafogo	4	4	5	2	3	2	4	4	4	4	4	3	3	3	4	4	4	4
Cutelinho	7	7	7	7	6	5	6	6	6	5	5	6	5	4	3	3	3	3
Nô Pintcha	8	9	9	10	9	7	7	7	7	8	7	7	7	7	7	7	7	7
Parque Real	10	8	8	9	10	10	10	10	10	10	10	10	10	10	10	10	10	10
Spartak d'Aguadinha	3	3	2	1	1	3	2	2	2	2	2	2	2	2	2	2	1	1
União São Lourenço	9	10	10	8	8	9	9	9	9	9	9	9	9	9	9	9	9	9
Valência	5	5	1	5	5	6	5	5	5	6	6	5	6	5	6	6	6	6
Vulcânicos	2	2	4	4	4	4	3	3	3	3	3	4	4	6	5	5	5	5

2014-15 Fogo Island Premier Division Champions

1st title

== Statistics ==
- Biggest win:

Spartak 12-0 Parque Real (April 12, 2015)

- Most differences in number of goals:

Spartak 12-0 Parque Real (April 12, 2015)

- Longest number one streak: Académica Fogo (weeks 1-2 and 6-16)
- Longest last place streak: Parque Real (week 1 and weeks 5-18)
