= Fogo Premier Division =

- Founded: c. 1950
- Region: Fogo, Cape Verde
- Number of clubs: 10 (Premier Division); 8 (Second Division)
- Promotion to: Cape Verdean Football Championship
- Relegation to: Fogo Second Division
- Domestic cup(s): Fogo Island Cup; Fogo Island Super Cup
- Current champions: Botafogo (19th title) (2024–25)
- Most championships: Botafogo FC (19 titles)
- Website: Official website

The Fogo Premier Division is a tier-2 regional championship played in Fogo Island, Cape Verde. The competition is organized by the Fogo Regional Football Association (Associação Regional de Futebol do Fogo, ARFF). The winner of the championship plays in the Cape Verdean Football Championships each season while the last-placed club relegates and participates in the Second Division in the following season.

== About the Island/Regional Championships and the Premier Division ==
The island league was formed in 1975 when Cape Verde became independent, unofficial competitions took place in years before the founding.

In the mid-1990s, it would become the next island league to also have a second division after Santiago (now divided into two zones). The last-place club was relegated, from around 2009, and the ninth-placed club plays with a runner up of the Second Division in a division decisional match. At that time, Fogo had the third most clubs in the nation. In 2017, the two last runner-up placed clubs will be relegated and participate in the Second Division in the following season.

One of the largest-scoring matches in league history is Spartak d'Aguadinha. Spartak has one of the most goals scored in a single season with 73 in the 2014-15 season.

Several times that the regional championships were interrupted due to volcanic eruptions and clouds covering as much as much of the island, in April 1995, the late part of the season and from November to December 2014 as the Premier Division.

== Title history ==
The first club that would win the most titles was Botafogo during the 1970s, their first nine title was won from 1976 to 1983, later two consecutive between 1984 and 1985 and their last in 2010. Académica for some times won titles, their first was in 1984, they won two consecutive in 1987 and 1988, then every two years between 1991 and 1997 and 2002 and 2004, Vulcânicos won three consecutive titles from 1998 up to 2000, they were the next club to win titles every two years between 2007 and 2011, Académica was the next club to win three consecutive titles from 2012 up to 2014. The 2014 volcanic eruption in mid-November delayed the season by about a month and matches were rescheduled, later in the season saw a couple of high scoring matches, the highest Spartak would finish with 12 points over Parque Real on April 12. In 23 years, a new first-timer in titles Spartak was the island champion for 2015. Cutelinho scored the most goals in the first weeks of the 2015-16 season, later taken by Académica in the mid season, nevertheless Vulcânicos won their next title in five years, later the club won two more in the 2017-18 season and is the recent victor of Fogo.

Botafogo has the most island titles with 17, the second is Académica (Fogo) with 13 and third is Vulcânicos with 9, the club with the fewest are two clubs with a single title, Cutelinho and recently Spartak d'Aguadinha.

== Broadcast use ==
Its top clubs of the region are broadcast on TCV and also on GreenSport, on radio they are broadcast on RCV.

== Fogo Premier Division – Clubs 2017–18 ==
- ABC de Patim
- Associação Académica do Fogo
- Atlético - Mosteiros
- Botafogo (São Filipe)
- Cutelinho FC (Mosteiros)
- Nova Era - São Filipe
- Nô Pintcha - Mosteiros
- Spartak (Aguadinha)
- Valência - Às-Hortas
- Vulcânicos (São Filipe)

== Winners ==
=== Regional Championships ===
- 1950–73: not known
- 1973–74: Vulcânicos
- 1974–75: not finished
- 1975–76: Botafogo
- 1976–77: Botafogo
- 1977–78: Botafogo
- 1978–79: Botafogo
- 1979–80: Botafogo
- 1980–81: Botafogo
- 1981–82: Botafogo
- 1982–83: Botafogo
- 1983–84: Académica
- 1984–85: Botafogo
- 1985–86: Botafogo
- 1986–87: Académica
- 1987–88: Académica
- 1988–89: Botafogo
- 1989–90: Botafogo
- 1990–91: Académica
- 1991–92: Botafogo
- 1992–93: Académica
- 1993–94: Vulcânicos
- 1994–95: Académica

=== Premier Division ===
- 1995–96: Botafogo
- 1996–97: Académica
- 1997–98: Vulcânicos
- 1998–99: Vulcânicos
- 1999–2000: Vulcânicos
- 2000–01: Botafogo
- 2001–02: Académica
- 2002–03: Cutelinho
- 2003–04: Vulcânicos
- 2004–05: Académica
- 2005–06: Botafogo
- 2006–07: Vulcânicos
- 2007–08: Académica
- 2008–09: Vulcânicos
- 2009–10: Botafogo
- 2010–11: Vulcânicos
- 2011–12: Académica
- 2012–13: Académica
- 2013–14: Académica
- 2014–15: Spartak d'Aguadinha
- 2015–16: Vulcânicos
- 2016–17: Vulcânicos
- 2017–18: Vulcânicos
- 2018–19: Académica
- 2019–20: not finished due to COVID-19 pandemic
- 2020–21: Vulcânicos
- 2021–22: Botafogo
- 2022–23: Vulcânicos
- 2023–24: Académica
- 2024–25: Botafogo

=== Performance by club ===
Club	Winners	Winning seasons
Botafogo	19	1975, 1976, 1977, 1978, 1979, 1980, 1981, 1982, 1983, 1985, 1986, 1989, 1990, 1992, 1996, 2001, 2006, 2010, 2022, 2025
Académica	15	1984, 1987, 1988, 1991, 1993, 1995, 1997, 2002, 2005, 2008, 2012, 2013, 2014, 2019, 2024
Vulcânicos	14	1974, 1994, 1998, 1999, 2000, 2004, 2007, 2009, 2011, 2016, 2017, 2018, 2021, 2023
Cutelinho	1	2003
Spartak d'Aguadinha	1	2015

== Topscorers ==
=== By season ===
Season	Nat.	Name	Goals	Club(s)
2016–17	(Cape Verde)	Luizim	26	Nô Pintcha dos Mosteiros

== Champion's Cup ==
A new competition called the Fogo Champion's Cup, equivalent to the newly created Champions' Trophy was introduced in 2016. The first edition took place on October 15, 2016 and featured a champion from the Premier and the Second Divisions. Vulcânicos and ABC de Patim were the first clubs to participate. In the following season, it was to feature the Premier Division winner Vulcânicos and the Second Division winner Nova Era, the match was not played.

- 2016: Vulcânicos
- 2017: Not played

== Other sports ==
=== Basketball ===
The island also has its own basketball championships. The competition is run by the Fogo-Brava Basketball Association (ARBFB, Associação de Basquetebol (or Basquete) do Fogo e Brava) and includes the nearby island of Brava. The champion of each season competes at the national level every year.

==== Teams ====
- Spartak d'Aguadinha

== See also ==
- Sports in Fogo, Cape Verde
- Fogo Island Cup
- Fogo Island Super Cup
- Fogo Champion's Cup (or Trophy)
- Fogo Opening Tournament
