= 2011–12 Fogo Island League =

- Season: 2011–12
- Champions: Académica do Fogo
- Promoted: Grito Povo
- Matches played: 90
- Goals scored: 245 (2.72 per match)

The 2011–12 Fogo Island League season began on 19 November and finished on 22 April. Académica do Fogo won their 11th title and qualified for the 2012 Cape Verdean Football Championships. The championship was organized by the Fogo Regional Football Association (Associação Regional de Futebol do Fogo, ARFF).

Vulcânicos was the defending team of the title. A total of 18 clubs participated in the competition, 10 in the Premier Division and 8 in the Second.

== Competing Teams ==
=== Premier Division ===
- Académica do Fogo
- Baxada
- Botafogo (also as Bota Fogo)
- Cutelinho FC
- Juventude do Fogo
- Luzabril
- Nô Pintcha dos Mosteiros
- Spartak d'Aguadinha
- Valência do Fogo
- Vulcânicos

=== Second Division ===
- ABC de Patim
- Brasilim
- Esperança de Achada Furna
- Grito Povo (or Gritu Povu) - Ribeira do Ilhéu
- Nova Era FC - Terra Branca subdivision, São Filipe
- Parque Real - Cova Figueira
- União de São Lourenço

== Table ==
=== Premier Division ===
Pos	Team	Pld	W	D	L	GF	GA	GD	Pts	Qualification or relegation
1	Académica do Fogo	18	14	2	2	41	15	+26	44	Qualification for 2012 Cape Verdean Football Championships
2	Vulcânicos	18	14	2	2	30	12	+18	44	
3	Botafogo	18	11	2	5	41	21	+20	35	
4	Valência FC do Fogo	18	8	4	6	29	18	+11	28	
5	Nô Pintcha dos Mosteiros	18	7	6	5	33	27	+6	27	
6	Spartak d'Aguadinha	18	7	4	7	35	26	+9	25	
7	Cutelinho	18	7	4	7	33	27	+6	25	
8	Juventude	18	4	3	11	17	43	−26	15	
9	Luzabril	18	2	2	14	15	46	−31	8	Divisional decisional match
10	Baxada	18	1	1	16	13	52	−39	4	Relegation to Segundona

Updated to match(es) played on 22 April 2012. Source: RSSSF
Rules for classification: 1) points; 2) goal difference; 3) number of goals scored.

=== Second Division ===
- 1st: Grito Povo

== Results ==
Week 1

19 November 2011

Luzabril 1-1 Cutelinho
Spartak 2-0 Juventude

20 November 2011

Baxada 0-3 Vulcânico
Académica 2-1 Valência
Nô Pintcha 0-1 Botafogo

Week 2

26 November 2011

Valėncia 3-0 Nô Pintcha
Botafogo 3-0 Baxada - Baxada did not show up

27 November 2011

Juventude 1-5 Académica
Luzabril 0-3 Vulcânico
Cutelinho 1-0 Spartak

Week 3

3 December 2011

Académica 7-0 Baxada - Baxada abandoned at 75', result stood
Vulcânico 3-2 Cutelinho

4 December 2011

Luzabril1-3 Botafogo
Spartak 2-0 Valência
Nô Pintcha 7-3 Juventude

Week 4

10 December 2011

Baxada 0-3 Spartak
Luzabril 0-0 Valência
Cutelinho 3-1 Botafogo

11 December 2011

Académica 1-1 Nô Pintcha
Juventude 0-1 Vulcânico

Week 5

17 December 2011
Botafogo 4-2 Juventude
Académica 3-0 Luzabril
Nô Pintcha 5-2 Baxada

18 December 2011

Vulcânico 2-1 Spartak
Valência 3-0 Cutelinho

Week 6

7 January 2012

Valência 3-1 Baxada
Luzabril 0-4 Nô Pintcha

8 January 2012

Spartak 2-4 Botafogo
Vulcânico 0-2 Académica
Cutelinho 4-1 Juventude

Week 7

14 January 2012

Académica 2-1 Cutelinho
Vulcânico 0-0 Botafogo

15 January 2012

Juventude 0-0 Valência
Baxada 5-0 Luzabril
Nô Pintcha 2-2 Spartak

Week 8

28 January 2012

Cutelinho 4-2 Baxada

4 February 2012

Luzabril 1-2 Juventude (Note: Originally for 28 January)
Académica 1-1 Spartak (Note: Originally for 28 January)

29 January

Botafogo 3-0 Valěncia
Vulcânico 1-2 Nô Pintcha

Week 9

11 February 2012

Spartak 4-1 Luzabril
Valência 1-2 Vulcânico
Nô Pintcha 0-0 Cutelinho

12 February 2012

Académica 2-1 Botafogo
Juventude 0-0 Baxada

Week 10

18 February 2012

Botafogo 3-0 Nô Pintcha
Juventude 2-1 Spartak
Cutelinho 2-0 Luzabril

19 February 2012

Vulcânico 2-1 Baxada
Valėncia 1-2 Académica

Week 11

3 March 2012

Spartak 4-3 Cutelinho
Baxada 0-1 Botafogo
Nô Pintcha 1-0 Valência

4 March 2012

Académica 0-1 Juventude
Vulcânico 1-0 Luzabril

Week 12

10 March 2012

Baxada 1-3 Académica
Juventude 1-1 Nô Pintcha

11 March 2012

Botafogo 5-0 Luzabril
Valência 1-0 Spartak
Cutelinho 0-1 Vulcânico

Week 13

17 March 2012

Spartak 5-0 Baxada
Valência 2-1 Luzabril
Nô Pintcha 1-2 Académica

18 March 2012

Botafogo 3-0 Cutelinho
Vulcânico 2-0 Juventude

Week 14

24 March 2012

Juventude 0-5 Botafogo
Luzabril 1-2 Académica

25 March 2012

Baxada 0-1 Nô Pintcha
Spartak 1-3 Vulcânicos
Cutelinho 2-2 Valência

Week 15

31 March 2012

Baxada 0-3 Valência (awarded as Baxada did not show up)
Juventude 0-4 Cutelinho
Nô Pintcha 4-2 Luzabril

1 April 2012

Botafogo 2-2 Spartak
Académica 0-1 Vulcânico

Week 16

7 April 2012

Spartak 1-1 Nô Pintcha
Botafogo 0-1 Vulcânico

8 April 2012

Cutelinho 2-3 Académica
Valência 3-1 Juventude
Luzabril 3-1 Baxada

Week 17

14 April 2012

Juventude 0-3 Luzabril
Spartak 0-2 Académica
Nô Pintcha 2-4 Vulcânico

15 April 2012

Baxada 0-3 Cutelinho (awarded as Baxada did not show up)
Valěncia 6-1 Botafogo

Week 18

21 April 2012

Luzabril 1-4 Spartak
Vulcânico 0-0 Valência
Cutelinho 1-1 Nô Pintcha

22 April 2012

Botafogo 1-2 Académica
Baxada 0-3 Juventude (awarded as Baxada did not show up)

== Position changes ==
Team ╲ Round	1	2	3	4	5	6	7	8	9	10	11	12	13	14	15	16	17	18
Académica do Fogo	3	1	1	2	2	1	1	1	1	1	1	1	1	1	3	2	2	1
Baxada	10	8	10	10	10	10	8	9	9	9	9	9	9	9	9	10	10	10
Botafogo	4	3	3	3	3	2	2	2	2	2	2	2	2	2	2	3	3	3
Cutelinho FC	5	4	5	5	6	5	7	5	6	4	6	6	6	6	6	7	6	6
Juventude do Fogo	9	10	9	9	9	9	10	8	8	8	8	8	8	8	8	8	8	8
Luzabril	5	7	8	8	8	8	9	10	10	10	10	10	10	10	10	9	9	9
Nô Pintcha dos Mosteiros	8	9	6	6	7	4	4	4	4	5	4	4	5	4	4	4	5	5
Spartak d'Aguadinha	2	6	4	4	4	7	6	6	6	6	5	5	4	5	5	6	7	7
Valência do Fogo	7	5	7	7	5	6	5	7	7	7	7	7	7	7	7	5	4	4
Vulcânicos	1	2	2	1	1	2	2	3	3	3	3	3	3	3	1	1	1	2

2011-12 Fogo Zone Premier Division Champions
Académica do Fogo
11th title
