= Fogo Island Super Cup =

Fogo Super Cup
- Founded: c. 2002
- Region: Fogo, Cape Verde
- Current champions: Vulcânicos

The Fogo (Island) Super Cup (Portuguese: Super Taça do Fogo, Capeverdean Creole: ALUPEK: Super Tasa du Fogu, Fogo Creole: Super Taça du Fogu) is a regional super cup competition played during the season in the island of Fogo, Cape Verde. The competition is organized by the Fogo Regional Football Association (Associação Regional de Futebol do Fogo, ARFF). Its current champions is Vulcânicos who won their second title, which was their next in a decade. The regional champion competes with the cup champion. If a champion also has a cup title, a cup club who is runner-up qualifies. The upcoming super cup will feature the champion Vulcânicos and the cup winner Académica do Fogo.

Several cancellations occurred including in 2010 and in 2011 where a cup runner up withdrew, it was canceled in 2014 and 2015, the time when Pico do Fogo on the nearby island to the west was erupting, it delayed the regional championships for a month and smaller delays occurred up to the start of 2017 and canceled the regional cup competition for 2015. The 2016 edition was undecided along with the cup final, one entrant would be the champion Vulcânicos.

== Winners ==
Season	Winner	Score	Runner-up
2002	Cutelinho^{1}		Académica do Fogo
2003	Unknown		
2007	Vulcânicos		Spartak d'Aguadinha^{1}
2008-2009	Unknown		
2010	Not held (Note: The edition would feature Botafogo (qualified as champion, also cup winner) and Vulcânicos (qualified as runner up in the cup final))		
2011	Not held (Note: The edition would feature Vulcânico (qualified as champion, also cup winner) and Spartak d'Aguadinha (qualified as runner up in the cup final))		
2012	Valência		Académica do Fogo
2013	Unknown		
2014	Not held (Note: The edition was not held because the regional cup did not take place for the 2013-14 season)		
2015	Not held (Note: The edition was not held, from late-November to early-February, Pico do Fogo erupted, it delayed the championship during the first month and canceled the regional cup competitions)		
2016	Uncertain (Note: The edition would feature the champion Vulcânicos and the cup winner which would be Académica do Fogo or Nô Pintcha dos Mosteiros)		
2016/17	Vulcânicos	4-3	Académica do Fogo

^{1}Runner up in the cup final as the regional cup winner was also the regional champion that season

== See also ==
- Fogo Island Cup
- Fogo Premier Division
- Fogo Opening Tournament
