= Fogo Island Cup =

- Region: Fogo Island, Cape Verde
- Teams: 20
- Current champions: Académica do Fogo

The Fogo Island Cup (Portuguese: Taça (Copa) da Ilha do Fogo, Capeverdean Crioulo, ALUPEC or ALUPEK: Tasa da Djarfogu, Fogo: Taça da Djarfogu (Djarfogo) or Djar Fogu (Fogo)) is a regional cup competition and is played during the season in the island of Fogo, Cape Verde, it consists of all the clubs from all the two regional divisions and are divided into about four to five rounds, for some seasons, a group stage was featured. The cup competition is organized by the Fogo Regional Football Association (Associação Regional do Fogo, ARFF). The cup winner competes in the regional super cup final in the following season when a cup winner also wins the championship, a runner-up competes. For several seasons, the winner qualified into Cape Verdean Cup which has been cancelled due to financial and scheduling reasons.

The first cup competition took place in 2001, the 2013–14 and the 2014-15 editions were cancelled, the 2015 one was not held due to the volcanic eruption that happened on Pico do Fogo. The 2016 cup competition took place, the 2016 final did not take place.

== Winners ==
Season	Winner	Score	Runner-up
2000/01	Académica do Fogo		
2001/02	Académica do Fogo		
2002/03	Botafogo		
2004-05	Unknown		
2005/06	Botafogo		
2006/07	Spartak d'Aguadinha		
2007/08	Académica do Fogo	2–0	Valência
2008/09	Académica do Fogo		
2009/10	Botafogo		Vulcânicos
2010-11	Vulcânicos		Spartak d'Aguadinha
2011-12	Valência		
2012/13	Unknown		
2013/14	Not held		
2014/15	Not held (Note: Not held due to the volcanic eruption of Pico do Fogo)		
2015/16	Unknown (Note: The final match featured Académica do Fogo and Nô Pintcha dos Mosteiros)		
2016-17	Académica do Fogo	1–1 (5–4 p)	Vulcânicos
2017-18	Académica do Fogo	2–1 (aet)	Botafogo

== See also ==
- Sports in Fogo, Cape Verde
- Fogo Premier Division
- Fogo Island Super Cup
- Fogo Champion's Cup (or Trophy)
- Fogo Opening Tournament
