= Estádio 5 de Julho =

Sports stadium in São Filipe Cape Verde

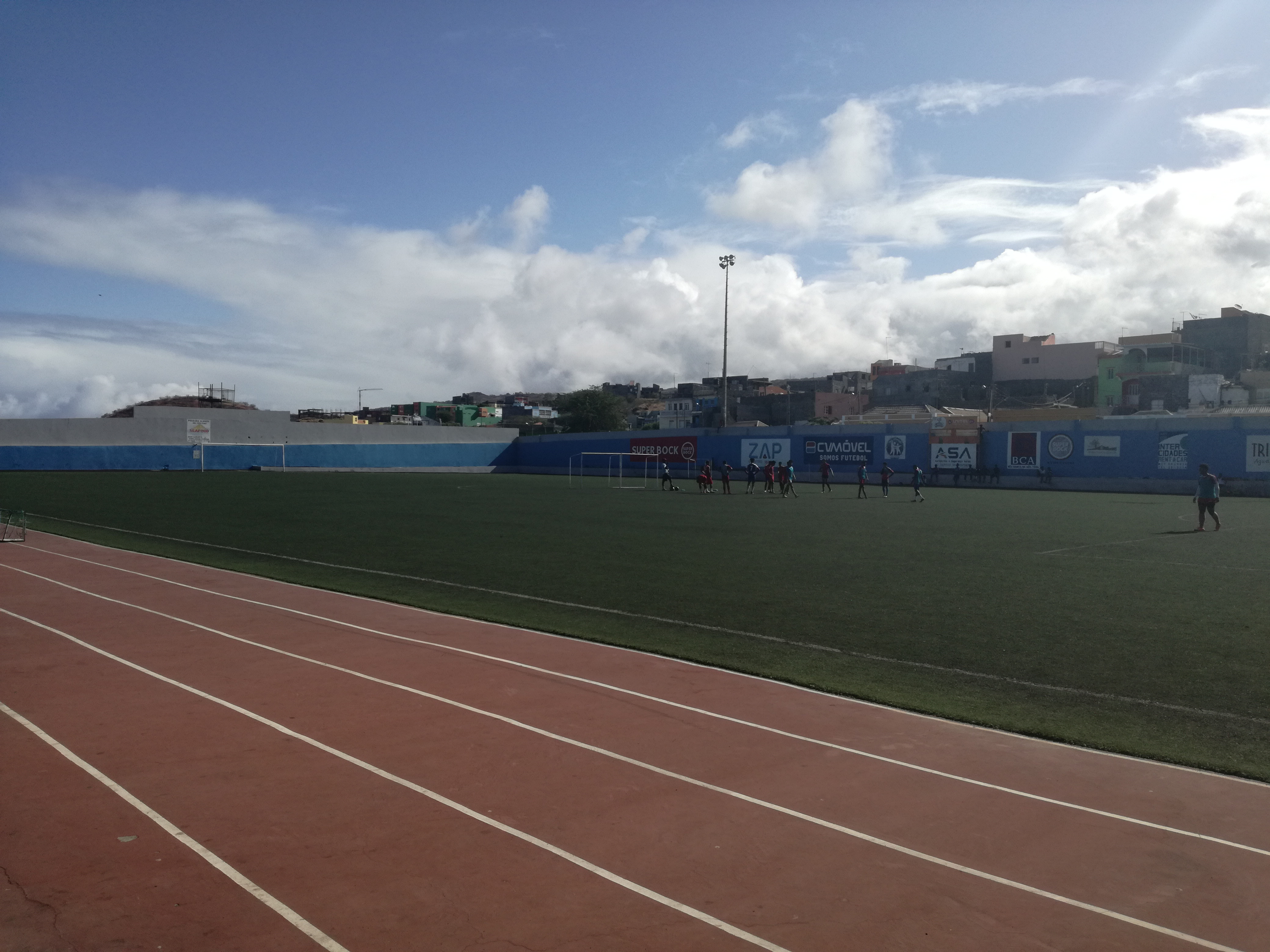
- Inside of the sports stadium of 5 de Julho

- Location within Cape Verde
- Location: São Filipe, Fogo, Cape Verde
- Coordinates: 14.898°N 24.4965°W
- Operator: Fogo Regional Football Association; Fogo-Brava Regional Athletics Association
- Capacity: 1,000

Tenants
- Académica do Fogo; Botafogo; Juventude; Spartak d'Aguadinha; União; Valência; Vulcânicos

Estádio 5 de Julho is a multi-purpose stadium in São Filipe, Cape Verde just east of the city center known as Pé de Campo and is near Alto da Aguadinha. It is currently used mostly for football matches. The stadium holds 1,000 people. The stadium is named with the date of Cape Verdean independence.

== About the stadium ==
The stadium is home to the island's best clubs including Académica do Fogo, Botafogo and Vulcânicos, it is also home to Juventude and the lesser club Atlântico. Teams based in a subdivision playing at the stadium are Spartak d'Aguadinha, Brasilim and Nova Era. Other teams that base in another part include União FC from São Lourenço and Valência from As Hortas. Its size is 100 by 65 m. Clubs from the municipality of Santa Catarina do Fogo play their Premier Division matches at the stadium despite having their Estádio Monte Pe Largo but is not mainly used for Premier Division matches. Track and field is of limited use at the stadium and is used for 100 meters competitions.

The interior walls are currently painted blue and stucco.

The stadium offers views of the surrounding subdivision of the city and the savanna (or grove) hills to the north.

== History ==
Some Cape Verdean Football Championship final took place at the stadium. One of the two matches that took place was in 1976, it was the first to be held outside the islands of Santiago or São Vicente and was the first held after the end of Portuguese rule, it featured Botafogo and Mindelense. The second was in 1999 which featured Amarante and Vulcânicos in the second match, Vulcânicos lost the title to Amarante. The third and last was in 2014 where the second match featured Académica do Fogo and Mindelense, the match ended in a draw and Académica do Fogo lost the title to Mindelense.

In 2014, the stadium was once again reused after repairs along with Simão Mendes Arena.

All of the two Cape Verdean Super Cup matches took place at the stadium, on May 1, 2013, and April 30, 2014.

It was the stadium where Académica Fogo were crowned regional champions in 2014, Spartak d'Aguadinha in 2015 and Vulcânicos in 2016 and 2017.

Several regional cups took place in the stadium, the recent one was in 2017. It was the stadium that Académica do Fogo became cup winners for 2017.

Several cancellation of events was at the stadium due to the 1995 and the 2014 eruptions.

== Other events ==
The São Filipe Municipal Tournament (Torneio do dia do Municipio e da Bandeira de São Filipe, Tournament of the Municipality and Flag Day of São Filipe), a municipal tournament takes place at the stadium each year during its municipal holiday on May 1.

== See also ==
- List of football stadiums in Cape Verde
- List of buildings and structures in Fogo, Cape Verde
