= Vulcânicos FC =

Vulcânicos Vulcânico
- Full name: Vulcânicos Futebol Clube; Vulcânico Clube do Fogo
- Nicknames: Encarnados; Benfiquinhas
- Founded: July 18, 1953
- Ground: Estádio 5 de Julho; São Filipe, Cape Verde
- Capacity: 1,000
- Manager: Raúl Santos
- League: Fogo Island League
- 2016–17: 1st, Champion
- Website: http://www.vulcanico.cv
Home colours	Away colours

Vulcânicos Futebol Clube or Vulcânico Clube do Fogo is a football club that had played in the Premier division and plays in the Fogo Island Division in Cape Verde. It is based in São Filipe the island of Fogo. The club has a total of nine island titles. Académica do Fogo are one of the unrelegated clubs on the island which includes Académica and Botafogo. Its current chairman is Raúl Santos who recently became in May 2017, its manager is Danildo Diniz and its goalkeeping coach is Emanuel Gomes.

Vulcânicos is the second most successful football (soccer) club on the island, having won about 14 official regional titles.

== History ==
The club was founded on July 18, 1953, after the publication of the charter in the official listing and is the oldest club on the island. Before the club was developed on the island, it consisted of fans and friends of Portuguese club Benfica. They nicknamed the club "Benfiquinha" (meaning "little Benfica" in Portuguese). The club celebrated their 25th anniversary in 1978 and their 50th anniversary in 2003. Their first island title win was in 1992, Vulcânicos won three straight titles in 2000, their fifth one was in four years, between 2007 and 2011, the club won titles once every two years.

Their greatest national success was in the 1999 season when they advanced into the finals and lost, they received second place.

In the 2010 regional cup, the club headed up to the finals and lost the title to Botafogo. Botafogo also won the regional championship title which is their last, Vulcânicos was to be participant into the regional super cup match as cup runner up, the match was not played.

A year later the club finished first with 48 points which is their highest, the club scored 55 goals which was a club record stood for six years, what remains a club record is their 16 wins. At the regional cup, they headed to the finals and defeated Spartak and won their only cup win in 2011, the club appeared in the 2011 edition of Cape Verdean National Cup. Vulcânicos was to play a regional super cup match with Spartak, runner up in the cup competitions, that match was not played.

In the 2011–12 season, Vulcânicos started with the first five wins with the first three with three goals, they started first, then second round up to round three, first place for the next two round. A loss to Académica was next and lost a position, then a scoreless draw with Botafogo was made and up to that time was second. Vulcânico suffered a 1–2 loss to Nô Pintcha Mosteiros and their positions dropped to third. Vulcânicos made eight straight wins afterwards, after their win over Académica in the island rivalry, they were first until a scoreless draw with Valėncia was made at the final round. Vulcânicos had 44 points alongside Académica. The club scored 30 goals, 11 less than Académica and lost a chance for a championship title, they finished second place.

As the 2016 Regional Premier Division winner, Vulcânicos faced ABC de Patim, the Second Division winner in the first ever regional Champions' Cup in November. Vulcânicos defeated ABC Patim and claimed their only title for the season.

Another success was made for the club for the 2016/17 season, the club started fifth, then second on December 10, then the club reached first place on February 25 at the end of the season and finished at the position, it shared Académica Fogo with 45 points, Vulcânicos scored five goals more than that club with 66, the club won their second consecutive championship title, also their 10th and earned them their entry into the 2017 Championships and placed in the newly created Group A and featured AJAC da Calheta, Onze Unidos and São Nicolau's Ultramarina Tarrafal, the club only had a win over AJAC de Calheta away, they had a draw with FC Ultramarina away, four remaining match ended in losses and the club failed to compete in the knockout stage. With 66 goals at the regionals, it is likely they made a club record. Vulcânicos headed up to the finals in the 2017 Fogo Cup, they lost to Académica Fogo. A rematch between Vulcânicos (qualified as champion) and Académica Fogo (qualified as cup winner) was made in the Fogo Super Cup which took place on October 21, the club won their second super cup title in a decade.

Vulcânicos started off the 2017–18 season with a two match winning streak, first defeating their rival Académica do Fogo, then Mosteiros's Nô Pintcha 1–4 and was the fourth highest scoring match of the region, at the second round, the club was second behind Spartak. This changed as they made another win over Botafogo and the club achieved first place at the third round and currently continues at the 7th round with 24 points and all matches won with their recent victories over Valência and Spartak. At the sixth round, they scored 10 goals, fifth in the region behind Botafogo, Académica, Spartak d'Aguadinha and Nô Pintcha dos Mosteiros. Up to the 9th round, the club had a six-point difference over second placed Académica, a scoreless draw with Nova Era on December 22 now makes it four. At the 8th round, the club had 13 goals, third in the region behind Académica and Botafogo and one ahead of Spartak. Another Fogo rivalry with Académica do Fogo at the 10th round was a 4–1 win. The club had 17 goals, behind Botafogo and Académica and two more than Spartak. Vulcânicos now has 21 goals, third in the region, four more than Spartak, they recently made a goal draw with Bota Fogo on January 27. At round 12, they had 32 points with 10 wins and two draws and were planning for another championship title and another entry into the nationals. After their draw, four straight wins were made, their greatest, a 6–0 win over Cutelinho made on February 18. their recent. an 0–3 win over Atlético and had 44 points and finally conquered for their third straight championship title. Another draw came at round 17 which ended in 2 goals apiece with Spartak., first place they will be next round. One more match to go and will be with Nova Era.

In the 2017–18 regional cup, the club defeated Nova Era 2–1 and qualified into the quarterfinals where only the Premier Division participants will be featured, the club defeated Cutelinho 5–1, Vulcânico played in the semis on March 3, brought the Fogo Rivalry to the semis, a loss they would suffer, 1–0 to Académica and lost both their final appearance and their planned cup title.

Vulcânicos will receive their 11th and third straight entry into the upcoming national championships, in the same group will be Sporting Praia, the previous season champion.

== Stadium ==
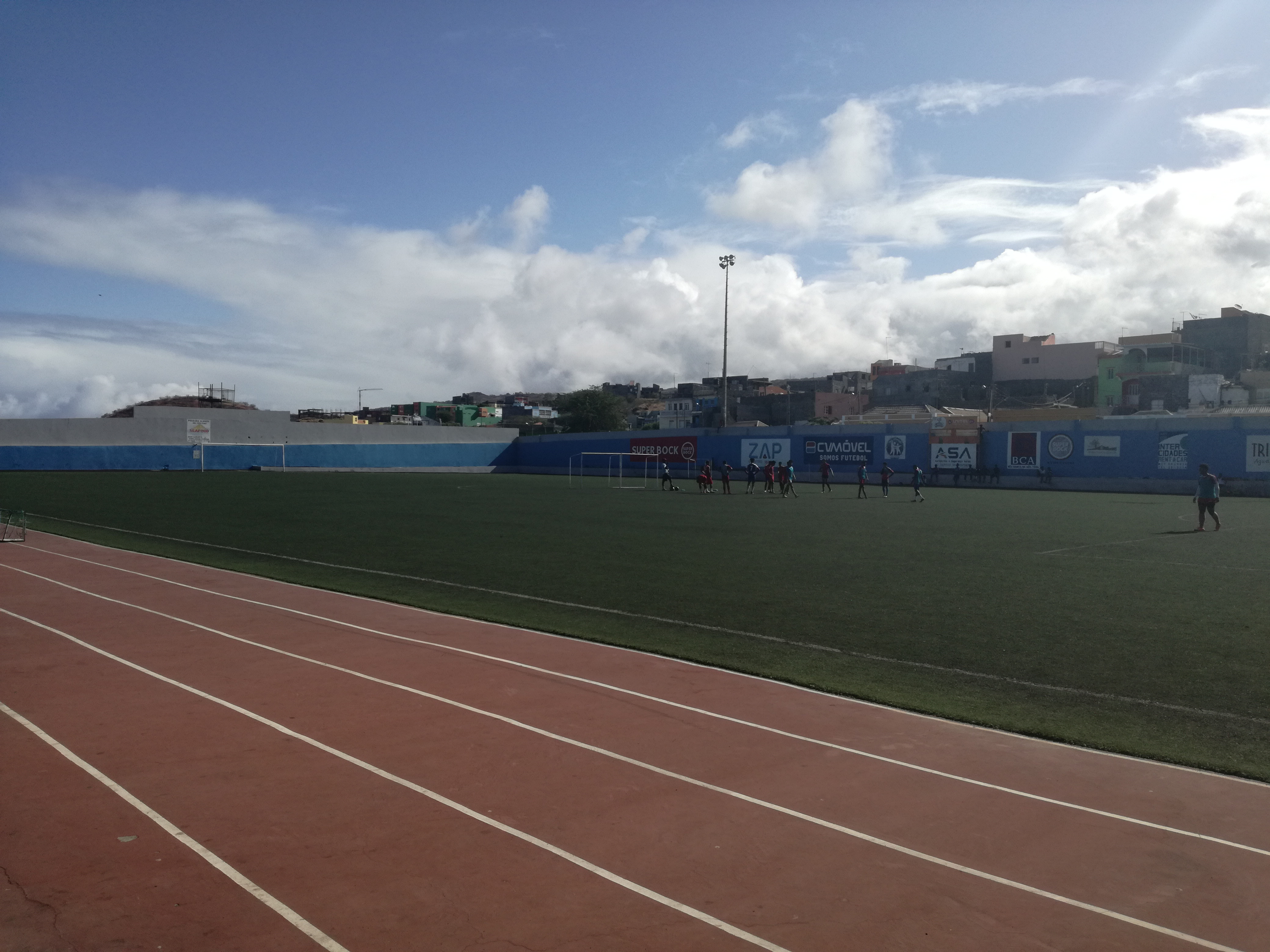
Estádio 5 de Julho, the homefield of Vulcânicos

The club plays at Estádio 5 de Julho with a capacity of 1,000. The club also trains at the stadium. Other clubs playing at the stadium includes Académica do Fogo, Botafogo, Juventude and the least prominent club Atlântico. Clubs based in a city subdivision includes Spartak d'Aguadinha, Brasilim of Monte Vaca and Nova Era FC of the east of the city. Other clubs playing at the stadium but not based are União FC from São Lourenço and Valência from As Hortas.

== Logo and uniform ==
Away/Alternate uniform used from 2013/14 to 2016

Its logo features a shield crest rimmed red, the club name is on top and the volcanic mountain of Fogo in the bottom. The year of foundation is on top and the nickname Benfiquinha on the bottom. A red label carried by a golden bird with the acronym VCF in the middle and inside a football or a soccer ball.

Its uniform colours for home matches has a white-red striped t-shirt with white sleeves and the rest of the clothing coloured red and a red uniform used for away matches (alternative during matches played by a different team sharing the stadium).

Up to 2016, the away or alternate uniform was colored white.

== Rivalry ==
The club's rivalry is with Académica do Fogo (see Vulcânicos–Académica do Fogo rivalry), one of two forming the Fogo Derby or Clássico do Fogo.

== Honours ==
- Fogo Island Championships/Fogo Premier Division: 11

1994, 1998, 1999, 2000, 2004, 2007, 2009, 2011, 2016, 2017, 2018

- Fogo Island Cup: 1

2011

- Fogo Island Super Cup: 2

2007, 2017

- Fogo Champion's Cup: 1

2016

== League and cup history ==
=== National championship ===
Season	Div.	Pos.	Pl.	W	D	L	GS	GA	GD	P	Cup	Notes	Playoffs
1999	1B	1	3	1	2	0	6	3	-3	5		Advanced into the finals	Finalist
2000	1B	2	2	1	1	0	1	0	+1	4		Did not advance	Did not participate
2004	1B	4	4	1	2	1	7	8	-1	5		Did not advance	Did not participate
2009	1B	4	5	2	1	2	3	4	-1	7		Did not advance	Did not participate
2011	1A	4	4	1	1	2	3	9	-6	4		Did not advance	Did not participate
2016	1B	6	5	1	0	4	2	9	-7	3		Did not advance	Did not participate
2017	1A	3	6	1	1	4	7	11	-4	4		Did not advance	Did not participate

=== Island/Regional Championship ===
Season	Div.	Pos.	Pl.	W	D	L	GS	GA	GD	P	Cup	Tour	Notes
2003–04	2	1	18	14	3	1	42	15	+27	45			Promoted into the National Championships
2008–09	2	1	16	11	4	1	42	14	+28	37			Promoted into the National Championships
2010–11	2	1	18	16	0	2	55	12	+43	48	Winner		Promoted into the National Championships
2011–12	2	2	18	14	2	2	30	12	+18	44			
2013–14	2	7	18	3	5	10	22	31	-9	14			
2014–15	2	5	18	8	6	4	46	22	+24	30			
2015–16	2	1	18	13	5	0	55	14	+41	44			
2016–17	2	1	18	14	3	1	66	12	+54	45	Finalist		

== Statistics ==
- Best position: 2nd (national)
- Best position at cup competitions: 1st (regional)
- Appearances at the championships:
  - National: 10
  - Regional: 41
- Appearance in a cup competition: 1 (national)
- Highest number of goals scored in a season: 7 (national), in 2004 and in 2017
- Highest number of points in a season:
  - National: 7
  - Regional: 48, in 2011
- Highest number of wins in a season: 2 (national)
- Lowest number of goals scored in a season: 1 (national), 2000
- Highest number of goals conceded in a season:
  - National: 9
  - Regional: 66, in 2017
- Highest number of goals conceded in a season: 11 (national), 2017
- Highest number of losses in a season: 4 (national), in 2016 and in 2017

== Current squad ==
As of May 16, 2017

Note: Flags indicate national team as defined under FIFA eligibility rules; some limited exceptions apply. Players may hold more than one non-FIFA nationality.

No.	Pos.	Nation	Player
1	GK	CPV	Rolando Lopes
2	DF	CPV	Nitchó
3	MF		Victor Touré
4	DF	CPV	Katio
5	DF	CPV	Mané de Coia
7	MF	CPV	Victor Piduca
8	MF	CPV	Pilé
9	FW	CPV	Kutchutcha (Note: ALUPEC: Kutxutxa)
10	FW	CPV	Adérito Andrade
11	MF	CPV	Zé Batatinha
12	GK	CPV	Lu
13	MF	CPV	Kadú

No.	Pos.	Nation	Player
14	FW	CPV	Kevy Badio
15	DF	CPV	Mitchô
16	DF	CPV	Deytchon
17	DF	CPV	Vando
18	DF	CPV	Branco
19	FW	CPV	Badio
20	MF	CPV	Kundum
21	MF	CPV	Jú
22	MF	CPV	Davi Alves
23	MF	CPV	Kâ
25	FW	CPV	Edgar Montrond

== Chairmen history ==
- (Cape Verde) Manuel Ribeiro (2016)

== Managerial history ==
- (Cape Verde) Lão (2015 – October 2016)
- (Cape Verde) Danildo Diniz (October 2016 – May 2017)
- (Cape Verde) Raúl Santos (since May 2017)

=== Assistant manager ===
- (Cape Verde) Danildo Diniz (since May 2017)

=== Goalkeeping manager ===
- (Cape Verde) Emanuel Gomes (since May 2017)
