= Fogo Opening Tournament =

Fogo Island Opening Tournament
- Founded: 2000
- Region: Fogo Island, Cape Verde
- Teams: 10
- Current champions: Cutelinho FC (2nd time)

The Fogo Island Opening Tournament (Portuguese: Torneio de Abertura do Fogo, Capeverdean Crioulo, ALUPEC or ALUPEK: Turnéu di Abertura du Fogo), is an opening tournament competition (equivalent to a league cup) played during the season in the island of Fogo, Cape Verde The competition is organized by the Fogo Regional Football Association. The winner with the most points (sometimes in the final) is the winner.

The first edition took place in 2001 and Botafogo was the first winner, Cutelinho was the second winner won in 2002. Since 2006, no competitions of the opening tournament/association cup has taken place.

== Winners ==
Season	Winner	Runner-up
2001	Botafogo	
2002	Cutelinho FC	
2003-05	Unknown	
2006	Cutelinho FC	
2014-15	Not held	
2015-16	Not held	
2016-17	Not held	

== See also ==
- Sport in Fogo, Cape Verde
- Fogo Premier Division
- Fogo Island Cup
- Fogo Island Super Cup
- Fogo Champion's Cup
