= Estádio Monte Pelado =

Sports stadium in Cova Figueira, Cape Verde

Estadio Monte Pelado
- Location within Cape Verde
- Former names: Estádio Adidas
- Location: Cova Figueira, Cape Verde
- Coordinates: 14.8807°N 24.2981°W
- Owner: Cova Figueira City Hall
- Capacity: 2500
- Executive suites: 25
- Surface: GrassMaster
- Field size: 110 m × 64 m (361 ft × 210 ft)

Construction
- Opened: 22 July 2000
- Renovated: 18 November 2017
- Cost: CV$ 55 million (2000) (US$ 550,000, in 2000) (600,000 Euros, in 2000)

Tenants
- Baxada; Desportivo de Cova Figueira; Esperança (Achada Furna); Figueira Pavão; Parque Real

The Estádio Monte Pelado, rarely known as Estádio Monte Pe Largo is a stadium in Cova Figueira, Cape Verde not far from the small mountain named Monte Pelado. South of the stadium is Ribeira do Coxo. The stadium is owned by the municipality of Santa Catarina do Fogo and is operated by the Fogo Regional Football Association.

== Description ==
The stadium was built in May 1999 and opened its doors in July 2000, construction cost CV$55 million ($US 550,000, 600,000 Euros, 2000 value) and had a capacity of 1,000 and the field size of 110 m × 64 m (361 ft × 210 ft). It is the home of several minor clubs including Baxada and Desportivo de Cova Figueira. It is also the home field of Esperança, a club based in nearby Achada Furna and the newly registered Figueira Pavão club based southwest of the stadium.

Desportivo Cova Figueira, as they are in the Second Division continue to play its matches at the stadium. Clubs based in the stadium and participating in the Second Division continues to play at the stadium.

The stadium was renovated in 2008, it's more new and has more touching models in it that represents each team. The City Hall of Cova Figueira planned to expand it. Recently around late 2015, the stadium underwent renovations as to that of São Lourenço as well as some expansions including its seats, its field became artificial turf and it was completed on November 18, 2017, its works costs CV$32 million, seating capacity added to 2,500 and its field size became 100 x 64 meters.

For the 2017–18 season, its matches features the Eastern Group clubs that are based in the municipality, one of two, the other is Estádio Francisco José Rodrigues in Mosteiros.

== See also ==
- List of football stadiums in Cape Verde
- List of buildings and structures in Fogo, Cape Verde
