= Spartak d'Aguadinha =

Sports club in São Filipe, Cape Verde

Spartak
- Full name: Associação Spartak D'Aguadinha
- Founded: September 2002
- Ground: Aguadinha and Estádio 5 de Julho; São Filipe, Fogo Island; Cape Verde
- Capacity: 1.000
- Chairman: Jaime Veiga
- League: Fogo Island League
- 2016–17: 8th
Home colours	Away colours

Associação Spartak D'Aguadinha is a sports club whose football team had played in the Premier division and plays in the Fogo Island League in Cape Verde. It is based in São Filipe's subdivision of Aguadinha located next to Bila Baxo (the city center) in the island of Fogo and plays at Estádio 5 de Julho. Spartak d'Aguadinha also has a basketball, volleyball and now a futsal department.

== History ==
Spartak d'Aguadinha was established in 2002, at the time it was one of the newest created in Cape Verde. It is named after the Russian club Spartak Moscow, Spartak d'Aguadinha is not an affiliate to that club and its logo is different. Not long after, they played their first regional championship match in Fogo.

The club celebrated its 10th year in 2012

During the 2014/15 season, the club brought a new trainer Joel de Castro and would be the first Cape Verdean club to have a Portuguese trainer, the club would score a record number of goals in some of its matches, with 14 wins and only two ties and losses, the club would score 8 goals over Parque Real in week 8 on February 8, 2015, their second high scoring match was a moderate 1–5 over Baxada a week later, the third one scored 6–4 over Nô Pintcha on February 22, the fourth one would be the island league's highest for the season and score 12 at home against Parque Real on April 12, the final match of the season was the fifth and final high scoring match and beat Baxada at home with 9 goals. This would lead to win the club's first ever island title and is the newest first-time title win in any of the island league in Cape Verde along with Beira Mar from Tarrafal of the Santiago Island League North, the next after Sporting Brava. Their total points was 44 and scored 73 goals. In goal scoring, led by the extension of other region's seasons, the 2014–15 number is the highest number of any of other regional championships to date.

As the Portuguese manager moved to Boavista Praia, a Southern Santiago League club on September 23, Jaime Veiga became Spartak's new manager. Spartak was not successful as last season, the club finished third with 36 points and scored 30 goals for the 2015–16 season.

Spartak had not a good season for the 2016–17 season, the club was 8th, above the relegation zone, around the start of Spring, they were seventh ahead of ABC de Patim up to April 8, a loss to Valěncia along with ABC Patim's win brought the club back to 8th place, an eleven-point difference with Baxada, the club was glad that they will continue to play in the Premier Division the following season.

Spartak started off the 2017/18 season well in the first round and excellent up to the second round with 3 wins and 6 goals and first place ahead of Vulcânicos, first they defeated Mosteiros's Nô Pintcha, then the island's top three clubs Académica do Fogo. Before, Spartak never was first place at the second round of the regional Premier Division. That number one position was taken by Vulcânicos at the third round after that club's third straight win and Spartak just made a goal draw with Nova Era, a club which returned after playing a few seasons in the Second Division. Spartak's loss to Valěncia in the fourth round dropped their positions to third place but a win over Atlético Mosteiros put back their second-place position at the fifth round, they scored 7 goals and conceded 6 goals, as they scored more than Nova Era but conceded more, both clubs were second place. Spartak was third with 14 points at round 7, the club had scored 12 goals, second behind Vulcânicos and Botafogo. Spartak lost to Vulcânico on December 16 and dropped a position from third, their goal totals were fourth as that club got their third goal totals. Another loss was made to Botafogo and dropped one more to fourth, they had 50/50 with 12 goals scored and the other conceded. On January 13, Spartak defeated Nô Pintcha 2–3 and had 15 goals which remained to be fourth in the Premier Division along with their position. Two more losses came to Spartak with their last to Nova Era and lost a position to fifth. Spartak made their first turnaround with a win over Valėncia on February 10, then a 2–0 loss to the less powerful Atlético, a newcomer to the Premier Division. Miraculously Spartak made a 7–3 win over Cutelinho and was still fifth with 23 points and 28 goals scored, third overall sharing with Botafogo. Spartak made their semis appearance at the 2017–18 Fogo Cup, they suffered a loss to Botafogo from March 4 and was out from the finals. Spartak was still fifth with 26 points and 31 goals scored, third overall and made a win over ailing ABC Patim, then a two-goal draw with Vulcânicos in their recent match. On March 25, Spartak will play with Botafogo, fourth place may be their maximum position, their lowest, fifth place.

=== In the National Championships ===
In the national championships, Spartak lost the first match to FC Derby 1–4 on May 9, their first ever and only win was 0–2 over Académica Operária in Sal Rei on Boa Vista Island, then the last three matches ended in defeat, Spartak lost to Académico 83 1–2 at home on May 24, Académica do Porto Novo 2–1 in Porto Novo on May 30 and 0–1 to Paulense on June 7. The club was ranked 5th and played their matches in Group A.

== Stadium ==
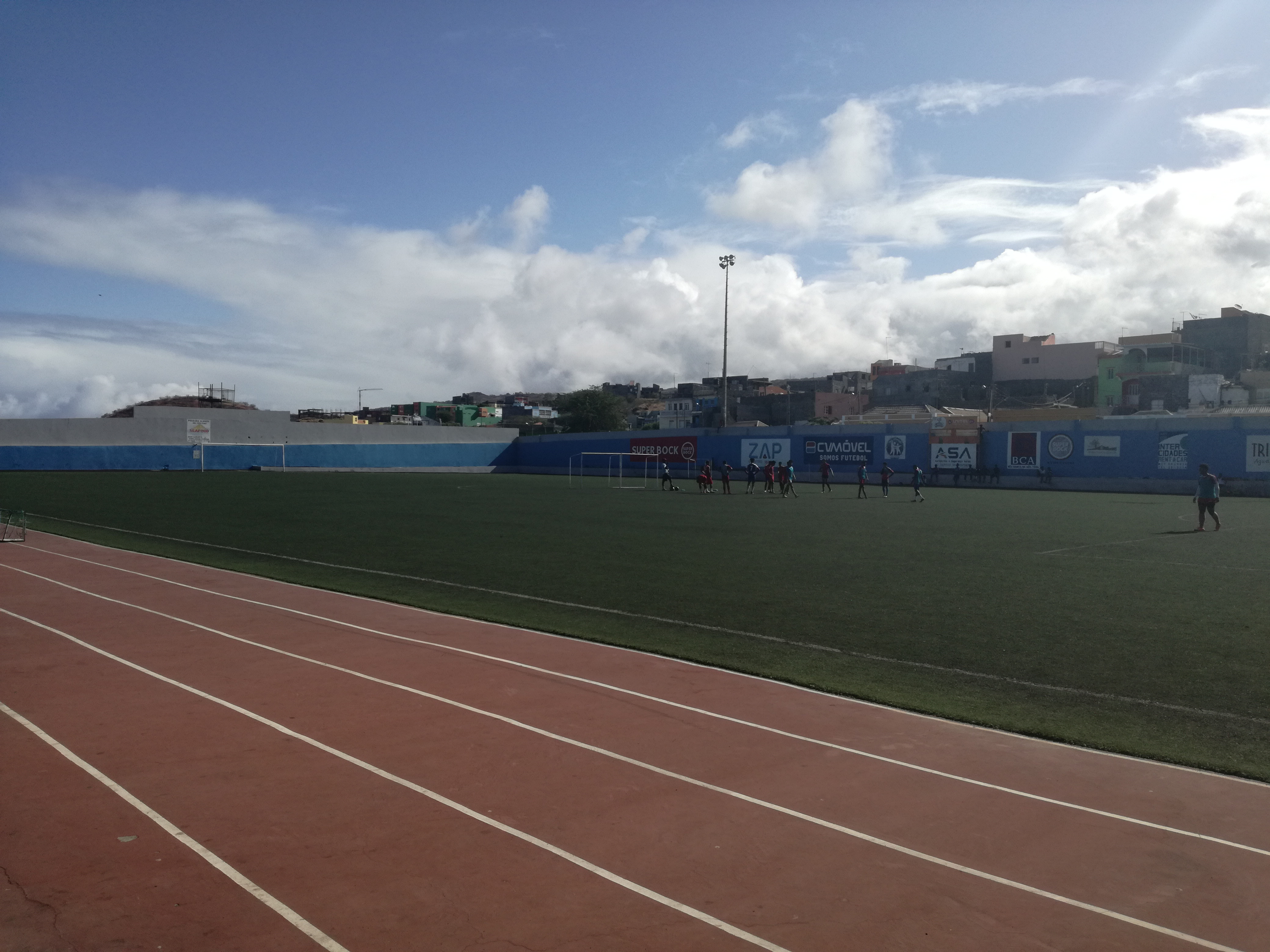
Estádio 5 de Julho, the homefield of Spartak d'Aguadinha

Spartak d'Aguadinha plays at Estádio 5 de Julho with a capacity of 1,000. The club also trains at the stadium. Other clubs playing at the stadium includes Académica do Fogo, Botafogo, Juventude, Vulcânicos and the least prominent club Atlântico. Clubs based in a city subdivision includes Brasilim of Monte Vaca and Nova Era FC of the east of the city. Other clubs playing at the stadium but not based are União FC from São Lourenço and Valência from As Hortas.

== Logo ==
Its logo colours has a black thick shield with the abbreviation "ADSA" on the small red portion and three white rims with the water tap.

== Uniform ==
Its uniform colours are a red t-shirt for home games and a white t-shirt with red sleeves for away/alternate matches. Black shorts and white socks are used both for home and away/alternate matches.

Until March 30, 2017, its uniform colors had a red-black striped T-shirt with black shorts and red socks for home games and a black T-shirt and shorts with thin red sides and red socks for away or alternate games.

Home uniform up to March 30, 2017
Away uniform up to March 30, 2017

== Honours ==
- Fogo Island League: 1

2014/15

- Fogo Island Cup: 1

2007

== League and cup history ==
=== National championship ===
Season	Div.	Pos.	Pl.	W	D	L	GS	GA	GD	P	Cup	Notes	Playoffs
2015	1A	5	5	1	0	4	5	9	-4	3		Did not advance	Did not participate
Total:			5	1	0	4	5	9	-	3			

=== Island/Regional Championship ===
Season	Div.	Pos.	Pl.	W	D	L	GS	GA	GD	P	Cup	Tour	Notes
2011–12	2	6	18	7	4	7	35	26	+9	25			
2013–14	2	5	18	9	5	4	25	18	+7	31			
2014–15	2	1	18	14	2	2	73	23	+50	44			Promoted into the National Championships
2015–16	2	3	18	11	3	4	30	17	+13	36			2nd place
2016–17	2	8	18	5	4	9	18	27	-9	19			8th place

== Statistics ==
- Best position: 5th – Group Stage (national)
- Best position at cup competitions: Finalist (regional)
- Total number of wins: 1 (national)
- Total goals scored: 5 (national)
- Total points: 3 (national)
- Highest number of points in a season: 44 (regional)
- Highest number of wins in a season: 14 (regional)
- Highest number of goals scored in a season: 72 (regional) – Highest of any of the regional championships (Tier 2)

== Managers ==
- (Portugal) Joel de Castro (2014 – September 2015)
- (Cape Verde) Jaime Veiga (since September 2015)

== Other clubs ==
Spartak d'Aguadinha has its own basketball club, one of four sports departments. Its games are played at Polidesportivo Simão Mendes. Another one is volleyball which is played at the same facility.
