= Botafogo FC (Cape Verde) =

Botafogo
- Full name: Botafogo Futebol Club
- Nicknames: Os Pretos e Brancos; The Black & Whites
- Founded: July 13, 1973
- Ground: Estádio 5 de Julho; São Filipe, Fogo Island; Cape Verde
- Capacity: 15.000
- Chairman: Manuel Anatólio Dias Fonseca
- Manager: Mário Pinto
- League: Fogo Island League
- 2016–17: 4th
Home colours	Away colours

Botafogo Futebol Clube (Capeverdean Crioulo, ALUPEC or ALUPEK: Botafogu Futibol Klubi, Djarfogo: Botafogu Futebol Klubi) is a football club that plays in the Fogo Island League in Cape Verde. It is based in the city of São Filipe in the island of Fogo and plays in its stadium, Estádio 5 de Julho. Académica do Fogo are one of the unrelegated clubs on the island which includes Académica and Vulcânicos. The owner of the club as of 2014 was Cabo Verde Telecom. It is one of many teams that only a few titles before (including one in the 1960s) and since independence including one in 1980. Its president as of the 2014–15 season is Manuel Anatólio Dias Fonseca and its manager as of the 2015–16 season is Mário Pinto.

Apart from football, there are also in the club basketball, volleyball and athletics departments.

Botafogo is one of the most successful football (soccer) club in Cape Verde and is Fogo's most successful club, having won about 23 official titles, only one is national and the remaining 22 are regional titles.

== History ==
The team was inspired by Botafogo in Brazil for its creation, adopted its name and uniform according to the South American team. It was formed on July 13, 1973. As that club is based in the neighborhood of Botafogo in the city of Rio de Janeiro, Brazil. The Capeverdean club's etymology name is of that of the island where the club is based, its alternative names are Bota Fogo or BotaFogo, which are sometimes known. To date it is the only Botafogo affiliate of any part of Africa. The club celebrated its 25th anniversary and the date of anniversary would be put on the bottom of the team logo.

=== Regional championships/Premier Division ===
Their first number of championship titles was won in 1976, Botafogo was the only club on the island to possess titles until Académica do Fogo won their first in 1984. The club won their first eight titles in 1983. Botafogo did not appear at the canceled 1979, 1980 and 1982 national championships. Overall, Botafogo was the second club in Cape Verde to win eight straight titles, one year after Mindelense which lasted from 1975 to 1982. They were the only two until 2000 when Nô Pintcha from Brava won eight straight which lasted from 1993. Both Botafogo and Mindelense became second in consecutive titles won as in 2001, Nô Pintcha Brava won their ninth straight in 2001. Recently its streak is now being shared with Santo Antão South's Académica do Porto Novo who won eight straight titles from 2011 to 2018.

Botafogo won two straight in 1986, again in 1990, they won their 13th title in 1992, their next was four years later in 1996, Botafogo won a title every five years up to 2006, their last regional title was won in 2010. Their championship titles are the most in the island and one of the most of any island league in the country. Overall, their total number of island leagues/championship titles in Cape Verde would be surpassed by Académica Operária of the Boa Vista Island League in 2014 with 18 titles and has 19 titles which was achieved in 2015.

In recent years at the regional championships, Botafogo finished 3rd for the 2013–14 season with 32 points, 4th in 2015 with 34 points, 10 wins, 4 draws and scored 44 goals, their last highest scoring match to date was a 10–1 win over Baxada on January 11, one of the least powerful clubs of the island's Premier Division. Botafogo later finished nearly poorly 7th for the 2015/16 season, down from fourth last season with 21 points, 6 wins and 9 losses. For the 2016–17 season, Botafogo finished a little better with 31 points and 9 wins and 4 draws.

Botafogo started off the 2017–18 season with a 5–0 victory over Cutelinho from the island's northeast and as of November 1, the highest scoring match of the region to date in the season, the club was first place for just a round before Vulcânicos took it during the second round, their positions at the fourth round slumped to sixth, behind Vulcânicos, Nova Era and Valência, the two lesser clubs of the island. Botafogo defeated Nova Era 3–0 on November 25 and gained a position to fifth. On December 2, Botafogo defeated ABC 4–0, the second highest match in the Premier Division was made and gained two positions to third with twelve points, shared with Académica, their difference was they had a goal less with that club, Botafogo scored 13, second in the region, ahead of Nô Pintcha dos Mosteiros with 10 goals, and first placed Vulcânicos and fourth placed Spartak who had nine goals. Botafogo became second behind Vulcânicos, with 21 points as of the 9th round, At round six, the club scored 15 goals, the most in the Premier Division alongside Spartak d'Aguadinha. Bota Fogo has 23 goals, second in the region behind Académica Fogo's. They recently made a goal draw with Vulcânicos on January 27, then a two-goal draw with Atlético afterwards, there, they lost a position to Académica. The unexpected came as they lost 1–0 to Nova Era, Botafogo recently made a win with the scored 3–2 over ABC Patim and also removed that club from participation in the division in the following season. Botafogo had 28 goals scored, third in Fogo, surprisingly shared with Spartak. Botafogo lost to Académica at the 16th round and its points were shared with Nova Era. Later, the club played with Nô Pintcha Mosteiros and no goals were scored, Botafogo is still third with 31 points, its 28 goals are now fourth in Fogo.

=== Other regional competitions ===
Also the club also won a three cup titles and an opening tournament title.

Botafogo is playing in the 2017–18 regional cup, they defeated Spartak d'Aguadinha 2–0 in the semis and will made their next appearance at the finals in eight years, they faced Académica on March 31, it ended in a 2–1 loss in extra time and failed to win another cup title for Botafogo.

In late 2015, Botafogo won the municipal tournament of São Filipe.

=== In the national competition ===
Their only national title was won in 1980 and is the only club from the island of Fogo to win a single national title.

Botafogo was the first club from Sotavento outside the island of Santiago to compete in the national finals in 1976, Botafogo won the semis and was the first all-Sotavento champion, at the finals, the club faced with São Vicente's CS Mindelense, the first match was scoreless, Botafogo lost the final match 3–0, they came for a second try in 1977 but lost to Sporting Praia, Botafogo appeared in the 1978 edition and faced Sporting Praia, the match went to a dispute as Sporting fielded an ineligible player, the award was undetermined, the result was a null. It led to the cancellation of the championships and no finals took place which would feature the winner of the Barlavento Islands Mindelense. The club returned in 1980 and again faced Mindelense, this time they defeated the club 2–1 (also it was the club's only goals scored at the finals) and claimed their first and only title, Botafogo reappeared in 1981 and headed up to the finals with CS Mindelense, they failed their second title after losing 2–0, this was their final appearance in the finals.

Botafogo finished 3rd in 2001 with 11 points. Five years later in 2006, Botafogo took part in Group A and finished 2nd behind FC Derby of the island of São Vicente with 8 points, the club had 2 wins and draws, Botafogo had draws at the 2nd and 3rd rounds and the last two ended in victory with the largest being a 5–0 win over Sporting Porto Novo in the final round, Botafogo headed to the semis and scored two goals and lost to Académico do Aeroporto from Sal eight goals in two semis matches, the latter lost to six. Their last appearance was in 2010 and played in Group A once more, not as successful as they did four years earlier, they just had 5 points, a win and two draws. The first week match was Botafogo's last national championship win, a 3–2 win over Solpontense of Santo Antão North in the first round. All of its two losses were made later first to Boavista Praia of Santiago South, then São Vicente's Batuque. Batuque's last two national championship matches were a single goal draw, first with Marítimo Porto Novo of Santo Antão South on May 30, then with Brava's SC Morabeza on June 6. Botafogo finished fifth and was out from playoff competition.

== Upcoming event ==
The club will be celebrating its 50th year of the club's foundation in July 2018.

== Stadium ==
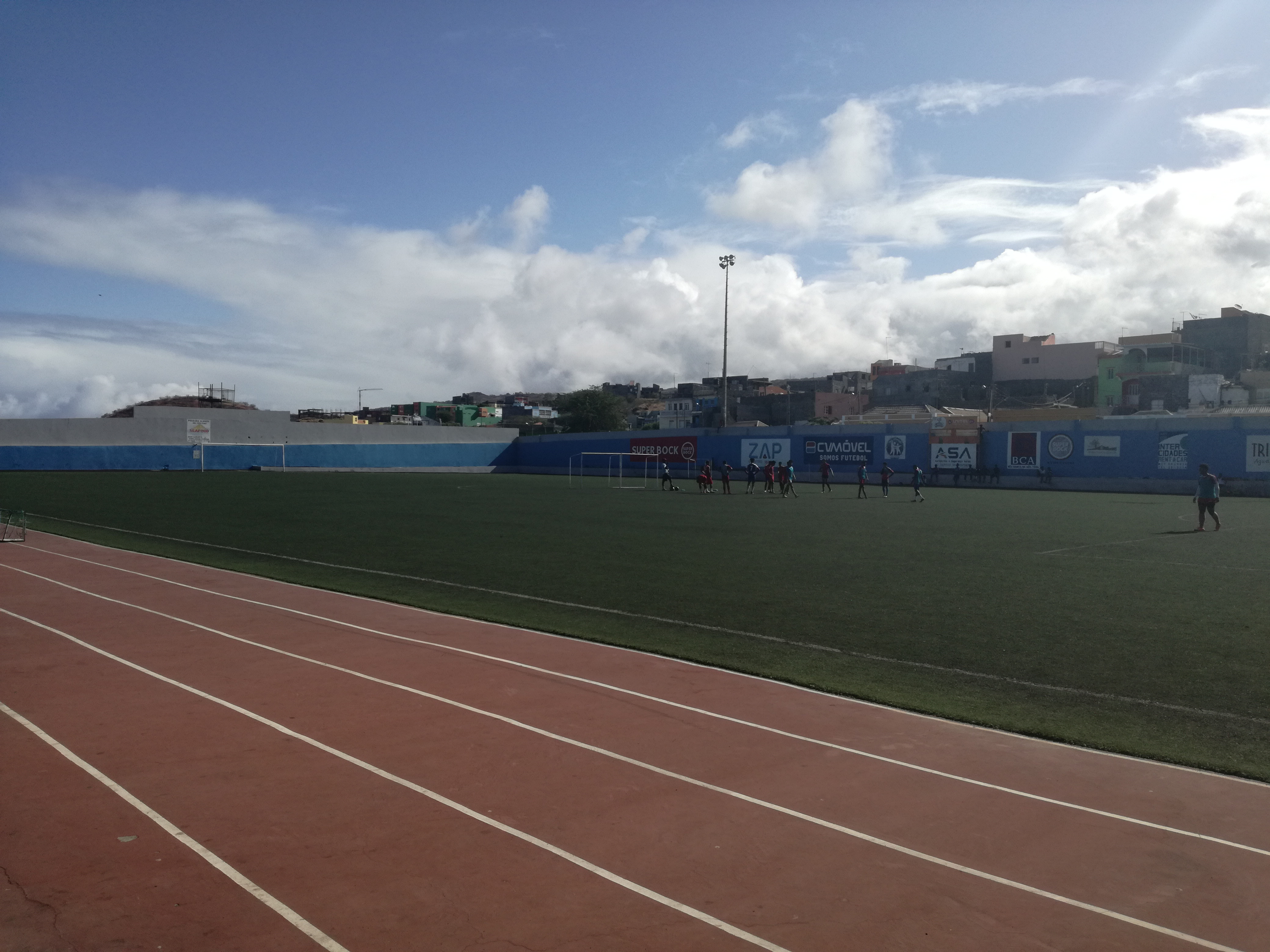
Estádio 5 de Julho, the homefield of Botafogo

Botafogo plays at Estádio 5 de Julho with a capacity of 1,000. The club also trains at the stadium. Other clubs playing at the stadium includes Académica do Fogo, Juventude, Vulcânicos and the least prominent club Atlântico. Clubs based in a city subdivision includes Spartak d'Aguadinha, Brasilim of Monte Vaca and Nova Era FC of the east of the city. Other clubs playing at the stadium but not based are União FC from São Lourenço and Valência from As Hortas.

== Uniform ==
Its uniform features a white-black striped T-shirt with four additional black lines than the previous, two white semicircle with black shorts and black-white striped socks used for home games and a yellow T-shirt with two thick black stripes with a yellow in the middle, black shorts and white socks used for away or alternate games.

Its uniform in the early 2010s was a black-white striped T-shirt with black sleeves, shorts and socks and a black-red striped T-shirt with black clothing for away games. The shirt was supplied by Adidas. Between 2012 and 2016, a white-black striped T-shirt with black shorts and black-white striped socks were used for home games and black clothing with a green T-shirt for away or alternate games.

Home uniform in the late-2000s up to early 2011
Away uniform in the late 2000s up to early 2011
Home uniform between 2012 and 2016

== Rivalry ==
The club's only rivalry is with Académica do Fogo, one of two forming the Fogo Derby or Clássico do Fogo.

== President ==
Its current president is Manuel Anatólio Dias Fonseca who he became on August 6, 2008

== Honours ==
- National:
  - Cape Verdean Championship: 1

1980

- Regional:
  - Fogo Premier Division: 17

1975/76, 1976/77, 1977/78, 1978/79, 1979/80, 1980/81, 1981/82, 1982/83, 1984/85, 1985/86, 1988/89, 1989/90, 1991/92, 1995/96, 2000/01, 2005/06, 2009/10

  - Fogo Island Opening Tournament: 1

2000/01

  - Fogo Island Cup: 3

2003, 2006, 2010

- Municipal:
  - São Filipe Cup/Municipal Tournament: 2

2007/08, 2015

== League and cup history ==
=== National championship ===
Year	Stage	Opposition	Result
1976	Semi-finals	Boavista Praia	Won
1976	Finals	CS Mindelense	Finalist
1977	Semi-finals	Sporting Praia	Lost
1980	Semi-finals	Club from Santiago	Won
1980	Finals	CS Mindelense	Champion
1981	Semi-finals	Club from Santiago	Won
1981	Finals	CS Mindelense	Finalist

Season	Div.	Pos.	Pl.	W	D	L	GS	GA	GD	P	Notes	Playoffs
2001	1	3	6	3	2	1	15	4	+11	11		
2006	1A	2	4	2	2	0	9	3	+6	8		3rd place
2010	1A	5	5	1	2	2	8	13	-5	5	Did not advance	Did not participate

=== Island/Regional Championship ===
- 1979–80: 1st
- 1995–96: 1st

Season	Div.	Pos.	Pl.	W	D	L	GS	GA	GD	P	Cup	Tour	Notes
2005–06	2	1	18	16	1	1	43	11	+32	49			Promoted into the National Championships
2006–07	2	2	18	-	-	-	-	-	-	-			
2008–09	2	5	18	-	-	-	-	-	-	-			
2009–10	2	1	18	-	-	-	-	-	-	-	Winner		Promoted into the National Championships
2011–12	2	3	18	11	2	5	41	21	+20	35			
2013–14	2	3	18	10	2	6	26	21	+5	32			
2014–15	2	4	18	10	4	4	55	20	+35	34			
2015–16	2	7	18	6	3	9	36	37	-1	21			
2016–17	2	4	18	9	4	5	34	21	+13	31			4th place

== Statistics ==
- Best position: 1st (national)
- Best position at the cup competitions: Finalist (2 goals scored)
- Appearances at the championships:
  - National: 13
  - Regional: 41
- Number of appearances in the National Championships: 12
- Highest number of points in a season:
  - National: 11
  - Regional: 49

Other:

- Best position at the São Filipe Municipal Tournament: 1st
