= Estádio Francisco José Rodrigues =

Sports stadium on Fogo, Cape Verde

- Location within Cape Verde
- Location: Mosteiros, Fogo, Cape Verde
- Coordinates: 15.0389°N 24.3338°W
- Operator: Fogo Regional Football Association (ARFF)
- Capacity: 1,000

Construction
- Opened: 1990s (first); January 30, 2010 (second)

Tenants
- Atlético dos Mosteiros; Cutelinho FC; Nô Pintcha dos Mosteiros; Grito Povo

Estádio Francisco José Rodrigues is a multi-use stadium in Mosteiros on the island of Fogo, Cape Verde, as the island size is small, it is the only sports venue on the island. It is used mostly for football matches and is the home stadium of Cutelinho and Nô Pintcha dos Mosteiros, clubs based from other parts of the municipality also plays at the stadium including Grito Povo. The stadium holds 1,000 people and its ground is artificial grass with its size being 100 by 64 meters and the longest going nearly east–west with a 20-degree angle towards the north.. The stadium is one of four operated by the Fogo Regional Football Association (ARFF), of which two are of the Premier Division.

== Location ==
Its location is northwest of the city center in the subdivision of Queimada (or Queimada Guincho) at the foot of Monte Velha (part of Mount Fogo).

== History ==
The stadium is the island's second to be built, around the late 20th century. Around 1990, when the first two clubs became registered, the stadium which was known as Estádio dos Mosteiros became operated by the regional association. For the 2003 season, all of the regional first stage matches were played.

In 2003, when Cutelinho was the only club outside the municipality of São Filipe to win a championship title, three of the five national championship matches took place at the stadium and one playoff match which was the first leg that it became abandoned at the 90th minute with the score 0-2 due to regression towards the referee, Cutelinho was disqualified and kicked out of the championships .

The stadium started improvements and renovations around 2008 and the newer one was opened on January 30, 2010, one of the participants was Sidónio Monteiro

For one season around 2010, all of its regional cup competitions were at the stadium. For one season in 2013, the regional cup matches featuring clubs that were part of the Mosteiros Group played at the stadium.

In the 2014 season, regional Premier Division matches were played every Saturday as Cutelinho, Nô Pintcha and Grito Povo were in the same division. From 2015 to 2017, clubs at the Premier Division based in the municipality were played each Saturday at 16:00 while Second Division matches were played each Sunday.

For the 2017–18 season, its matches features the Eastern Group clubs that are based in the municipality, one of two, the other is Estádio Monte Pe Largo in Santa Catarina do Fogo.

== See also ==
- List of football stadiums in Cape Verde
- List of buildings and structures in Fogo, Cape Verde
