= Fogo Regional Football Association =

- Founded: 1975
- Location(s): São Filipe, Cape Verde
- President: Pedro Fernando Pires
- Affiliations: Cape Verdean Football Federation
- Website: Official website

The Fogo Regional Football Association (Portuguese: Associação Regional de Futebol do Fogo, abbreviation: ARFF) is a football (soccer) association covering the island of Fogo. It is headquartered in the city of São Filipe, the island capital. The Fogo Premier Division is a regional championship played in Fogo Island, Cape Verde. The winner of the championship plays in the Cape Verdean football Championships of each season. Its current president is Pedro Fernandes Pires since September 2015.

== About the Island/Regional League's area ==
The area includes the whole island.

== Organization ==
The association also organizes and functions the Fogo Regional Championships, the Cup, the Super Cup, the Opening Tournament and now the Champions' Cup. The association has 20 registered clubs, Académica Fogo and Botafogo are pro clubs and Vulcânicos is a semi-pro club, the remaining are amateur, beginner and starter clubs. The regional champion competes in the National Championships each season, once did in the cup (2007, 2009, 2010, 2012) competition who competed at the national level. The association has the third largest number of clubs after Santiago's two zones and ahead of São Vicente. The regional championships has two divisions, each with ten clubs.

- Fogo Premier Division (10 clubs)
- Fogo Second Division (10 clubs)

== About the Island/Regional Association ==
They are one of three regional associations that maintain more than one venue.

Before the championship was established, the first football/soccer club was Vulcânicos which was founded in 1953, then Académica was founded later in 1962 and Botafogo was founded in 1968 More clubs were created after the foundation of the championships including Cutelinho in 1983 and Desportivo de Cova Figueira in 1994, the newest clubs are Spartak d'Aguadinha established in 2003 and Valência in 2004.

In the early -2000s, it would become the next island league to also have a second division. The last place club were relegated, from around 2009, the ninth placed club plays with a runner up of the Second Division in a division decisional match. At that time, Fogo had the third most number of clubs in the nation. In 2017, two last placed clubs will be relegated and participate in the Second Division in the following season.

One of the largest scoring matches in league history is Spartak d'Aguadinha. Spartak has one of the highest numbers of goals scored in a single season with 73 in the 2014-15 season.

In the second division on February 11, 2017, Nova Era defeated Brasilim 0-20 and made it the highest scoring match to date of any of the regional leagues and one of the highest in history. It put the club into the promotional zone and put União out from ever returning to the Premier Division.

== Registered clubs ==
The region's registered clubs as of November 2017.

- ABC de Patim
- Académica do Fogo
- Atlântico - São Filipe
- Atlético - Mosteiros
- Baxada (Baixada Fluminense), also known as Beira-Mar - Cova Figueira
- Botafogo (São Filipe)
- Brasilim - Monte Vaca, São Filipe
- Cutelinho FC (Mosteiros)
- Esperança - Achada Furna
- Figueira Pavão (registered in September 2017)
- Grito Povo - Ribeira do Ilheu
- Juventude - São Filipe
- Juventus Curral Grande (registered in September 2017)
- Luzabril - Luzia Nunes
- No Pintcha - Mosteiros
- Nova Era - São Filipe
- Parque Real - Cova Figueira
- Spartak (Aguadinha)
- União FC - São Lourenço
- Valência - Às-Hortas
- Vulcânicos (São Filipe)

=== Former clubs ===
- Dynamo de Cova Figueira - now part of either Desportivo Cova Figueira or Parque Real
- Tribo do Sol (2006-2008) - now part of Nova Era

== See also ==
- Sports in Fogo, Cape Verde
