= Cutelinho FC =

Football club in Cape Verde

Cutelinho
- Full name: Cutelinho Futebol Clube
- Nickname: Leoninhas (Little Lions)
- Founded: October 8, 1983
- Ground: Estádio Francisco José Rodrigues; Mosteiros, Cape Verde
- Capacity: 1,000
- Manager: Amarildo Baessa
- League: Fogo Island League
- 2015–16: 5th
Home colours	Away colours

Cutelinho Futebol Clube is a professional football club that currently plays in the Fogo Island League in Cape Verde. It is based in the village of Mosteiros in the northeastern part of the island and plays in the stadium with a capacity of 1000. Its current manager is Amarildo Baessa. Its nickname is leoninhos which means little lions in Portuguese. On September 2, 1996, the team faced Desportivo de Cova Figueira for the first time and defeated that club 3–1 in the opening tournament.

== History ==
The club was founded on October 8, 1983.

Their first and only title was won in 2003 and thus the only club from the island outside the capital São Filipe ever to win a championship title and one of the clubs to do so combined with cup and super cup titles. Other titles included the island's super cup won in 2002 and the opening tournament won in 2005. From 2005 to 2012, it was the only club from outside the island capital to have a super cup title until Valência won the title in 2012.

Their only participation in the national level was in 2003, the club challenged with Batuque, Paulense, Académica Operaria, Barcelona of Tarrafal and Académico Aeroporto. Cutelinho defeated Paulense, Académica Operaria and Académico do Aeroporto which was the last game. The second-place ranking offered them a spot in the semis and faced FC Ultramarina from the island of São Nicolau, the first match was at 0–2 but was abandoned at the 90th minute due to the referee being attacked, Ultramrina was awarded 0–3 and Cutelinho was kicked out of the championships, the second match was cancelled, the club finished as a semi-finalist; they were placed in Group B and finished second behind Académico do Aeroporto with 11 points.

The club celebrated its 25th anniversary in 2008.

In the island division, the 2013–14 season finished second after Académica do Fogo with 36 points, the 2014–15 season finished third with 35 points, one of its matches scored a 9 over Parque Real on January 18 and a 6–1 over Parque Real in the home match on March 14.

Cutelinho celebrated its 32nd anniversary in 2015.

The club elected Amarildo Baessa as new manager of the club on October 24, 2015. Their first match of the 2015/16 season started on November 7 and defeated Juventude away with a high score of eight, Académica tied the highest goal number on December 20 and made it the two highest-scoring matches up to January 30 the following year, the first match of round 10 saw the team scored ten goals over Juventude and now made the highest scoring match of Fogo's Premier Division until April 3 when Académica took the most goals scored in a single match with twelve, Cutelinho held the number one spot for the first two weeks then dropped to third from rounds 5 to 8 and then fourth place until round 17 to 26 with the exception of Round 12 where they were fifth place. Cutelinho had the most goals scored in the season up to March 13 when Vulcânicos topped it over 47 goals, Cutelinho were tied with 49 goals with Académica do Fogo as of Round 16 on April 3 and the other club surpassed in Round 17. Cutelinho received 26 points, their highest for the season, no further wins occurred in the remainder of the championships. Cutelinho finished fifth in the Premier Division. In goal scoring, the club reached the pinnacle of goal scoring numbering 52, third in the championship and probably a club record.

Cutelinho started the 2016–17 season with a draw, then a loss, on March 18, the tenth round, the region's highest scoring match of 10 was shared with Vulcânicos after defeating Baxada 10–0. The seasonal record lasted for a nearly a month when No Pintcha defeated Baxada 4–11 on April 15 and its results became second in the Premier Division and since April 23, third. The club finished sixth but had the same 26 points, wins, draws and losses as lase season, the club scored fewer goals that numbered 29.

Cutelinho started the 2017–18 season at the worst start with currently the worst match in the Premier Division as they lost 5–0 to Botafogo. At the third round, they lost to the newcomer from the same city Atlético Mosteiros 3–2. In the past two rounds, Cutelinho conceded seven goals at the 8th round and their goals conceded is now 18, at that round, it was the worst in the region alongside Nô Pintcha of the same city and ABC de Patim, now it is third since the 9th round. Also Cutelinho was eighth place. On January 28, Cutelinho suffered a two match losing streak and put the club inside the relegation zone. They remain with three more losses with their recent, a 6–0 loss to Vulcânico which is their worst. Cutelinho greatly suffered with a 7–3 loss to Spartak and a much smaller loss to Valěncia. The club was 9th and is in a 50/50 zone of being relegated which never done to Cutelinho. Cutelinho conceded 42 goals, the worst in Fogo, now shared with ABC Patim. Cutelinho did not show up in São Filipe to play with Académica on a 17th round match, the regional association awarded against the club 3–0 and Cutelinho will finish 9th and will be relegated for the first time next season. Cutelinho's final Premier Division appearance will be with Nô Pintcha of the city and municipality. Cutelinho were one of four (or five) remaining original clubs that were unrelegated.

== Logo ==
Its logo is a seal with a thick green outer rim reading the club name and the foundation date on the bottom, inside is a large football (soccer ball) and a smaller one with Pico do Fogo in the middle and "Cutelinho" on the bottom.

== Uniform ==
Home uniform from September 2014 to early April 2017
Away uniform from September 2014 to early April 2017

Its uniform colors is a yellow t-shirt with light (French) green shorts for home games and a white-green striped t-shirt with white sleeves with green rims at the end and green socks for away/alternate games. White socks are used for both.

From September 2014 to early April 2017, green-white striped T-shirt for home games and a white T-shirt with yellow sleeves for away games. Black Shorts and green socks are used for both home and away matches.

== Honours ==
- Fogo Island League: 1

2002/03

- Fogo Island Super Cup: 1

2002

- Fogo Island Opening Tournament: 2

2002, 2006

== League and cup history ==
=== National championship ===
Season	Div.	Pos.	Pl.	W	D	L	GS	GA	GD	P	Notes	Playoffs
2003	1B	2	5	3	2	0	7	3	+4	11	Promoted into the Championships	Semi-finalist

=== Island/Regional Championship ===
Season	Div.	Pos.	Pl.	W	D	L	GS	GA	GD	P	Cup	Tour	Notes
2002–03	2	1	-	-	-	-	-	-	-	-			Promoted into the National Championships
2011–12	2	7	18	7	4	7	33	27	+9	25			
2013–14	2	2	18	11	3	4	41	22	+19	36			
2014–15	2	3	18	11	2	5	49	23	+22	35			
2015–16	2	5	18	8	2	8	52	39	+13	26			
2016–17	2	6	18	8	2	8	29	20	+9	26			6th place

== Statistics ==
- Best position: Semifinalist (national)
- Best position at cup competitions: Finalist (regional)
- Matches played: 6 (national)
- Total wins: 3 (national)
- Total goals: 7 (national)
- Total number of points: 11 (national)
- Most goals scored in a season: 52 (regional), in 2016
