= Académica do Fogo =

Associação Académica do Fogo
- Full name: Associação Académica do Fogo
- Nickname: Mika Fogo
- Founded: November 18, 1962
- Ground: Estádio Municipal 5 de Julho, São Filipe, Cape Verde
- Capacity: 1,000
- Owner: Mário César Pires
- Chairman: Emanuel Soares
- League: Fogo Island League
- 2016–17: 2nd
Home colours	Away colours

Associação Académica do Fogo is a football club that plays in the Campeonato Nacional de Cabo Verde and in the Fogo Island League in Cape Verde. It is based in the island of Fogo and plays in the stadium with a capacity of 1000. The logo and the uniform as well as other teams with the name Académica and Académico in Cape Verde is identical to Académica de Coimbra, it features the volcanic mountain on the right. The club name and the year of foundation are at the bottom. Académica do Fogo are one of the unrelegated clubs on the island which includes Vulcânicos and Botafogo.

Académica do Fogo is the second most successful club on the island, having won 16 official regional titles.

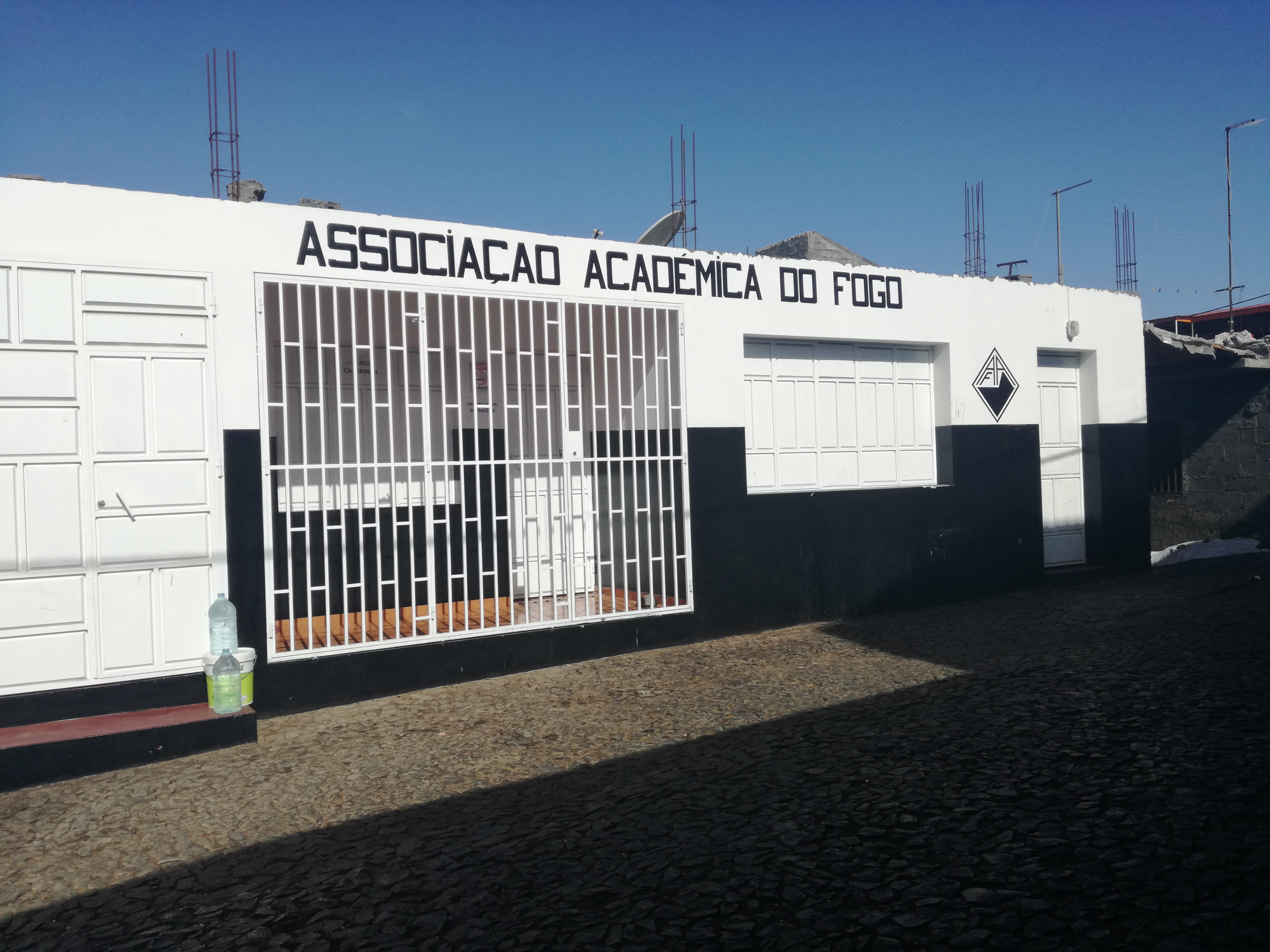
Headquarters of Académica do Fogo

== History ==
The club was founded on November 18, 1962 (some sources stated as July) and is an affiliate of Académica de Coimbra. The club celebrated their 25th anniversary in 1987.

Académica played its first regional competition in 1976 after being registered. The first title the claimed for the island was in 1985, later, the team won two consecutive titles in 1987 in 1988.

Académica won two straight regional cup titles in 2002.

In the national championships, In the 2002 season, they started with a 4–2 win over Académica Operária of Boa Vista and held it as the highest for two weeks, two losses followed including one to Sporting Praia, their position dropped to sixth. A two match winning streak was followed before their goal draw with Atlético was made, their position risen to fourth. After their bye week in week 7, two straight wins were made, each with five goals which was the season's fourth highest, first 5–1 over Sanjoanense of Santo Antão and their position risen to third, then 5–0 over the weak Académica da Brava. Along with Académico do Aeroporto and SC Atlético, the club had 16 points and was third, it was second ranked. From the reintroduction of the group stage in 2003 up until the stage changed in 2016, not a single club would have 16 points. As the national championships became three groups and each club has a six match regular season, still not a single club has over 16 points today. Académica do Fogo finished third, shared with SC Atletico and Académico do Aeroporto, they also had 5 wins and a draw, the difference was the club scored 21 goals, more than Académico do Aeroporto's 19 and Atlético's 17, it was also more than Batuque's 19 goals who was second.

Académica won a regional title in 2005 and headed to the nationals and played in Group A, no luck as their match with Sport Sal Rei Club (of Boa Vista Island) ended in a loss. A double goal draw with Paulense DC of Santo Antão was next. Académcia Fogo made a 6–1 win over Flor Jovem, champion of Santiago North. At the fourth round, they suffered a loss to Académica do Sal, the last season match, a 2–0 win over Ribeira Brava, champion of Sãp Nicolau. Académica finished third and failed to qualify into the playoff stage.

Académica's next two seasons were in the moderate range in Fogo. But in 2008, another regional title was achieved in the Premier Division and another stint at the nationals was made, better than the one in 2005, again they played in Group A. Académica won the first three matches where they defeated Brava's GD Corôa, Boa Vista's Sal Rei and São Nicolau's Ribeira Brava. A goal draw with Académico do Aeroporto do Sal was made at round 4. The final match was a 3–0 loss to Sporting Praia, champion of Santiago South. Académica Fogo finished second with 10 points and 3 goals, sharing Académico do Aeroporto, Académica Fogo won 9, two more than the Sal-based club and headed into the playoff stage. Académica Fogo neither won two legs of the semis as they lost to São Vicente's FC Derby and was out from appearance at the finals.

Académica won two more straight Fogo Cup titles, first in 2008 after a 2–0 win over Valência, they did not head to the national cup as the competition was cancels, their recent one was in 2009 and got their national participation where they did not succeed in a round.

In special titles, the club won the title for Académicas of Cape Verde.

Académica went into a winning legacy at the regional championships where they got three straight titles in 2014 and three straight national appearances. Académica started with three consecutive wins, first 2–1 over Valėncia (there they were third), their results got bigger, a 1–5 win over Juventude, then a huge 7–0 win over Baxada, first th, as that club had fewer players, the match was finished at the 75th minute, also the club was first place at the third round for two rounds. A goal draw with Nô Pintcha was made on December 11, there they lost a position to second. Then three additional wins, the last two ended in two goals, at the sixth round, they regained first position. Another single goal draw was made, this one with Spartak at the eight round. Académica made two more wins before they suffered a loss to the less powerful Juventude. Three more wins were made before a loss in the Fogo Rivalry to Vulcânicos and lost two positions to third place, they still had a chance for a title. Académica won the last three matches, at the 16th round, they were second and their hopes for a title regained, at the last round, they regained first position and finished it. Académica had 44 points equaling to Vulcânicos, Académica scored 41, 11 more than the second placed club, they achieved the first of three national participation. Académica enjoyed the 2012 national season and played in group A, they defeated Académica da Brava in the Académica match of the west of Sotavento. A scoreless draw with Santiago North's Estrela dos Amadores was made, Académica Fogo suffered a loss to almighty Sporting Praia on May 19. A scoreless draw with Sal's Juventude was made, they made their last win of group stage with a 2–1 win over São Vicente's Batuque. Académica headed to the knockout stage after finishing second behind Sporting and challenged with São Nicolau's SC Atlético, Guy scored first at the 11th minute and remained the only goal scored for the club as they lost 1–2 in Fogo, another loss followed in Ribeira Brava and out from further competitions.

=== Académica Fogo's recent successful years ===
On 18 November 2012 celebrated their 50th anniversary. In the 2012–13 season, Académica won their second straight and finished with 47 points, had 15 wins and made a club (probably a regional) record of 70 goals, two years later, Spartak scored more with 72 and overtook Académica Fogo's record. Académica Fogo enjoyed another national season and was placed in Group B. A draw with any goals scored was their first match and featured Solpontense from Santo Antão North. Surprisingly two wins were made, first over Académica do Porto Novo, then Scorpion Vermelho, champion of Santiago North. Another scoreless draw was made at the fourth round. Académica finished without losses as they made a win over Maio's Académico 83 and headed to group stage. They faced the top five of Cape Verde and Barlavento's powerful team CS Mindelense from São Vicente, played in Mindelo, Quinzinho tied the match at the 77th minute with a goal each and that became the final result. The second leg was played at home and Académica lost the whole match and was out from the appearance at the finals.

Académica started the 2013–14 season with four straight wins, the first was over Juventude and started second the second was a large 8–1 win over Grito Povo, then the last was a large 0–7 win over União São Lourenço. Académica suffered two losses, first to Nô Pintcha Mosteiros to Spartak at round 6, Académica underwent eight straight wins, after their second over Cutelinho, first place for the remainder of the season, their biggest was on February 23, 7–0 over União. Académica made a goal draw with Spartak at round 15, a win over Vulcânicos came next, then the last two matches ended in no other than draws, three each with Cutelinho and one apiece with Valência of As Hortas. Académica won their recent Premier Division title for Fogo and had 42 points.

Académica made their recent national appearance in 2014. Académica Fogo was placed in Group B, their first match which was on April 5 ended in a double goal draw with Sal's SC Verdun, based in Pedra de Lume. Académica Fogo made a win over Académica Operária before another draw was made with São Nicolau's SC Atlético. The last two matches ended in victories, over almighty CS Mindelense, then Maio's Académica da Calheta. Académica finished second behind Mindelense and appeared in the semis and faced almighty Sporting Praia, both legs ended in draws, first without goals at home field, then two apieceat Praia, the first was scored by Sy at the 16th minute and the last by Cláudio at the 81st minute and under away goals rule, qualified in the national finals for the only time in the 2013/14 season and challenged CS Mindelense. Their first match lost 2–1 to Mindelense, Victor would score the only goal in the finals at the 29th minute, their second match was scoreless and would achieve second place and would be their best appearance at the national level. Sy was the player who scored the most goals in the nation numbering five.

=== Recent history ===
Danilo became coach of Académica do Fogo around 2014. Académica started with a huge 7–0 win over Parque Real, Académica was to face Spartak on November 23, the eruption near Pico do Fogo at Pico Pequeno delayed the match until the volcanic clouds became less which was on December 14, it ended in a goal draw, up to that was first place. Académica made another goal draw with Vulcânico in the island rivalry on December 29, the club became third. Académica's match with Cutelinho was postponed due to a loss of a player that was in the boat Vicente. The match was rescheduled for January 13 and won 1–3. Académica made a surprising eight straight wins, the first a huge 6–0 win over Baxada, then 2–0 over Valencia and got first-place position back which was lastly held by Spartak. The largest result was a 2–8 win over the weakest Premier Division team in history, Parque Real. Académica met Cutelinho, instead of their 9th win, a loss the club suffered. Next came two more wins over Baxada, then a larger 1–7 over Valência, a club who took away first place from the club at the third round and was their revenge. Académica played with Botafogo on April 4 and not a single goal was scored which ended in a draw. A rare loss to Nô Pintcha came up and lost first position to Spartak, it was Académica's final chance for a regional title as they had 39 points, two less than Spartak's. Académica defeated União de São Lourenço 0–4 at the final round, Spartak's win over Baxada meant Académica lost a chance for a regional title and a national participation, the club finished second with 42 points, also they scored 52 goals, third behind third placed Botafogo's.

Académica Fogo finished second in the 2015/16 season with 43 points, 13 wins and four draws. The club had 57 goals, the season's highest and also had had the highest result with 1–12 over União de São Lourenço on April 3 in a Round 16 match and made the highest scoring match of the season and second time with 12 goals. Also the club scored 57 goals which was the most for the season.

In 2016, the club appeared at the Boavista's Champion's Cup in Praia on October 28 a friendly competition, the club lost in the semis and played a 3rd place match on October 29 against CS Mindelense.

The club started fourth for the 2016–17 season in November. On December 10, they picked up the first-place position with they got it up to February 25 and remain second for the rest of the season, for the third time, the club repeatedly finished second, it shared the same points with Vulcânicos numbering 45 but scored five goals less numbering 61. On the final week of the season on April 23 and was the last regional match, the club threw out Baxada from the Premier Division entirely in the following season after a huge 14–0 victory but failed to achieve regional champions as they had fewer goals scored than Vulcânicos. The club reached the cup final on March 5, as Vulcânicos won the regional champ title on Apr 23, the club received qualification to the regional super cup later in the year. Académica do Fogo defeated Vulcânicos and won their next cup title in eight years after winning 5–4 in the penalty shootouts as the match ended in a goal draw, they qualified into the super cup as cup winner. On October 21, the club challenged the champion Vulcânicos in the island's super cup and lost the title to that club.

The club continues to have Claudio, Sy and Victor in the current squad, also included are Fifa, Kevy and Basy. Académica Fogo started the regional 2017–18 Premier Division season with a loss to their rival Vulcânicos, another since their super cup loss. Another loss was made on November 4 to Spartak 3–2. Their match polarity shifted to winning as they won the season's first match over Valência on November 12, overall, the club had a four match winning streak before losing to Botafogo on December 10, that time, they had a six-point difference behind Vulcânicos, also they had 14 goals, the region's highest, a goal more than Botafogo who was third. Académica got two more wins as they defeated Cutelinho and Atlético Mosteiros, the club was third with 18 points, ten less than Vulcânicos who recently loss to that club in the Fogo rivalry at the 10th round. Nonetheless, they had the most goals scored in the Premier Division with 23. Académica currently has a five match winning streak, the first was a 4–1 win over Spartak, then they defeated Valėncia and, remained to be third up to the 12th round. Nô Pintcha was next and their result was another win and Académica became second. Next was ABC de Patim and got better as they made a huge win, a 1–9 result and the match ended at the 85th minute, their last wins were over Nova Era and Botafogo. Académica was still goal scoring maters in the region with 45 total, they were eight points behind Vulcànicos, a chance for a title for Académica entirely faded as well as another national participation. Académica appeared on field in São Filipe, later Cutelinho, facing relegation next season did not appear in the 17th round match on March 18, the regional association awarded the club 3–0. Académica's last match of the season will be with another Mosteiros based club Atlético. Académica is now seven points behind Vulcânicos, a maximum of a four-point difference, with eight ahead of Botafogo, second Académica will finish. Académica will be goal masters of Fogo for the season, now with 48 scored, 12 more than Vulcânicos.

Académica Fogo started the 2017–18 regional cup at the second round with a 2–0 win over Atlético Mosteiros on January 5. Their next match was in early February and defeated Valência do Fogo. Académica headed to the semis and played the Fogo rivalry with Vulcânico, they won 1–0 and got their second consecutive appearance into the final, they faced another club, Botafogo on the last day of March and won 2–1 in extra time and got the cup title. Académica Fogo also got their super cup qualification later in the season and will compete with the regional champion Vulcânicos.

== Stadium ==
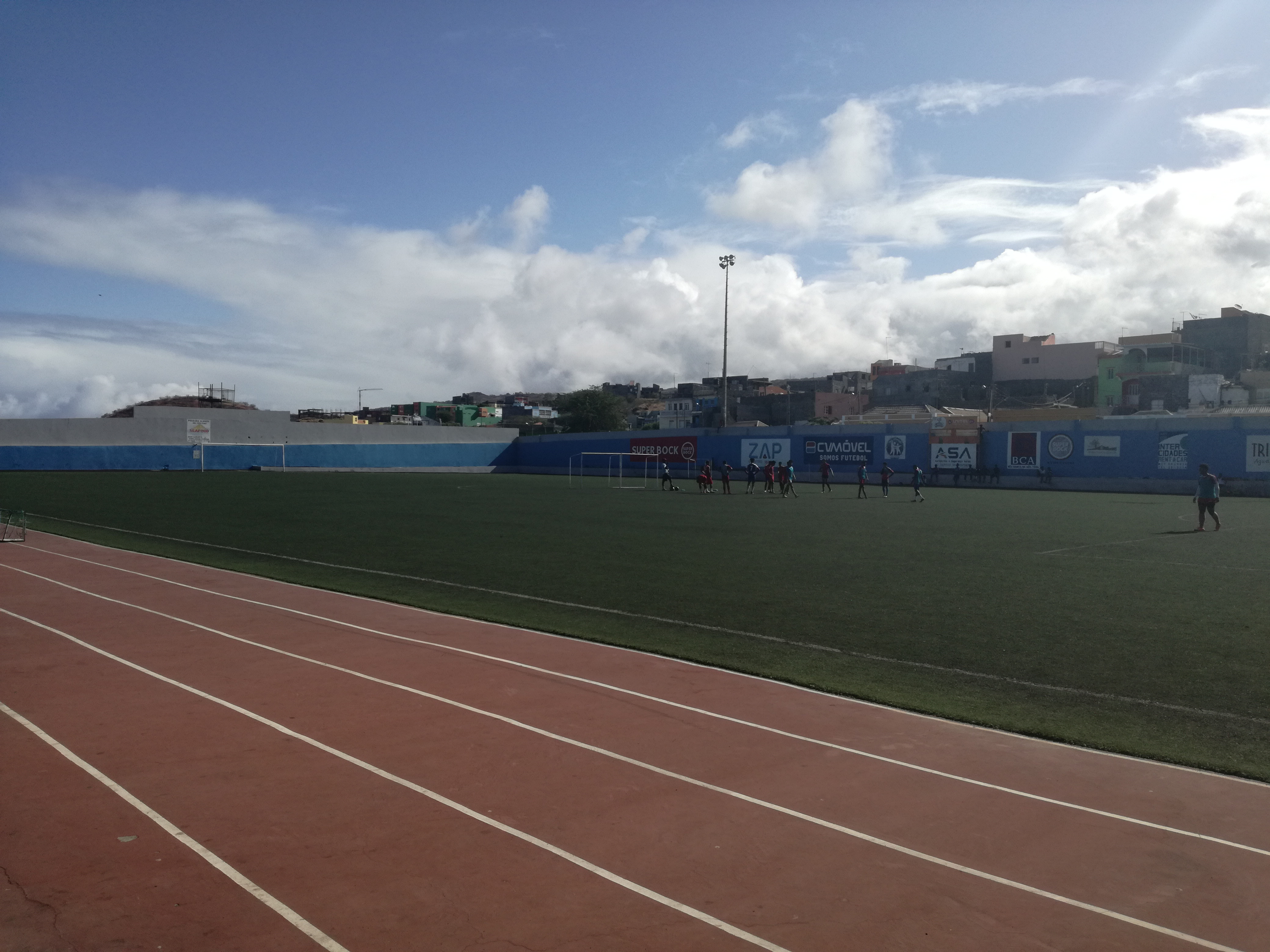
Estádio 5 de Julho, the homefield of Académica do Fogo

The club plays at Estádio 5 de Julho with a capacity of 1,000. The club also trains at the stadium. Other clubs playing at the stadium includes Botafogo, Juventude, Vulcânicos and the least prominent club Atlântico. Clubs based in a city subdivision includes Spartak d'Aguadinha, Brasilim of Monte Vaca and Nova Era FC of the east of the city. Other clubs playing at the stadium but not based are União FC from São Lourenço and Valência from As Hortas.

== Rivalry ==
The club's two rivalries are with Vulcânicos (see Vulcânicos–Académica do Fogo rivalry) and Botafogo forming the Fogo Derby or Clássico do Fogo.

== Uniform ==
Away uniform up to 2013/14
Away uniform from 2015 to 2016

Its uniform colors are black clothing with white sides and white sleeve edges which is more white at the front and a white rim for home games and a violet colored t-shirt with black sleeves and shorts and white socks for away games.

Its former uniform color was a white t-shirt, black shorts and socks for away games in the early 2010s. Between 2015 and 2016, it featured a black-white hooped or striped clothing starting and ending with black sides with black sleeves and the remainder of the clothing coloured black.

== Honours ==
- Regional:
  - Fogo Island League: 13

1984/85, 1986/87, 1987/88, 1990/91, 1992/93, 1994/95, 1996/97, 2001/02, 2004/05, 2007/08, 2011/12, 2012/13, 2013/14

  - Fogo Island Cup: 5

2001, 2002, 2008, 2009, 2017

- Other:
  - São Filipe Municipal Tournament: 1

2017

== League and cup history ==
=== National championship ===
Season	Div.	Pos.	Pl.	W	D	L	GS	GA	GD	P	Cup	Notes	Playoffs
2002	1	3	8	5	1	2	21	12	+9	16			
2005	1A	3	5	2	1	2	10	7	+3	7		Did not advance	Did not participate
2008	1A	2	5	3	1	1	9	6	+3	10			4th place
2012	1A	2	5	2	2	1	3	3	0	8			4th place
2013	1B	1	5	3	2	0	4	0	+4	11			Semi-finalist
2014	1A	2	5	2	2	1	7	2	+5	8			2nd place

=== Island/Regional Championship ===
Season	Div.	Pos.	Pl.	W	D	L	GS	GA	GD	P	Cup	Tour	Notes
2004–05	2	1	18	-	-	-	-	-	-	-			Promoted into the National Championships
2007–08	2	1	18	-	-	-	-	-	-	-			Promoted into the National Championships
2011–12	2	1	18	14	2	2	41	15	+26	44			Promoted into the National Championships
2012–13	2	1	18	15	2	1	70	6	+64	47			Promoted into the National Championships
2013–14	2	1	18	13	3	2	59	15	+44	42			Promoted into the National Championships
2014–15	2	2	18	13	3	2	52	9	+43	42			2nd place
2015–16	2	2	18	13	4	1	57	14	+43	43			2nd place
2016–17	2	2	18	14	3	1	61	10	+51	45	Winner		2nd place

== Statistics ==
- Best position: 2nd (national)
- Best position at cup competitions: 1st (regional)
- Appearances at the championships:
  - National: 13
  - Regional: 42
- Highest number of points: 16 (national)

== Players ==
=== Current squad ===
- Djidjexerem Mica Cobom
- Claúdio
- Sy
- Victor
- Dany
- Zé Manuel
- Fifa Kök-Böys
- Djedjin
- Kevy
- Basy

=== Youth team ===
- (Cape Verde) Zé Luís, in 2007

== Managerial history ==
- (Cape Verde) Danilo Dias (in 2015)
- (Cape Verde) Emanuel Soares (since February/March 2017)
