= As Hortas =

- Settlement
- Coordinates: 14.965°N 24.474°W
- Country: Cape Verde
- Island: Fogo
- Municipality: São Filipe
- Civil parish: São Lourenço

Population (2010)
  - Total: 380
- ID: 8210103

As Hortas is a settlement in the northwestern part of the island of Fogo, Cape Verde. It is situated 2 km west of Curral Grande, 3 km southwest of Ponta Verde and 8 km north of the island capital São Filipe.
