= 2017–18 in Cape Verdean football =

Football in Cape Verde
- Season: 2017–18

The 2017–18 season is the season of competitive football (soccer) in Cape Verde.

== Diary of the season ==
- October 1: Matches for the 2017-18 Fogo Premier Division were made
- October 14: Académico do Aeroporto won their 6th Sal Super Cup title
- October 15: FC Derby won their second São Vicente Super Cup title
- October 21: Vulcânicos won their second Fogo Super Cup title
- October 22:
  - the Boa Vista Association Cup begins
  - the Sal Island Opening Tournament/Association Cup begins
- October 24: Académica Operária won their second Boa Vista Super Cup title
- October 28:
  - The 2017-18 Fogo Premier Division begins.
  - The 2017-18 Maio Super Cup took place between Onze Unidos and Santana de Morrinho, the match was abandoned at the 85th minute due to poor lighting and the edition came without a winner
  - Sporting Praia won their third Santiago South Super Cup title
  - Onze Unidos won their only champion's trophy for Maio
- November: GD Varanda, 2nd place in Santiago South Second Division last season withdrew, Tira Chapéu, third in that competition competed for the first time in the regional Premier Division
- November 3: The 2017-18 Santiago South Premier Division begins
- November 4: Brava Opening Tournament begins
- November 11:
  - the 2017-18 Maio Regional Cup begins
  - SC Santa Maria won their second straight Opening Tournament (Association Cup) title for Sal
- November 17: the 2017-18 Santiago North Premier Division begins
- November 18: the 2017-18 Sal Island Cup begins
- November 25: Rosariense Clube won their only Santo Antão North Super Cup title
- November 29: the 2017–18 Santiago South Cup begins
- December: the 2017-18 Sal Premier Division begins
- December 3: Onze Estrelas of Bofareira won their only Boa Vista Island Association Cup title
- December 5: the 2017-18 São Nicolau Cup begins
- December 9:
  - The 2017-18 Boa Vista Island Championships begins
  - The 2017-18 Fogo Island Cup begins
  - The 2017-18 Santo Antão North Premier Division begins
  - The 2017-18 São Vicente Premier Division begins
  - Sal Premier Division: SC Santa Maria defeated ASGUI 2-9 in Espargos and is the highest result of any second tier competitions in the nation
  - SC Morabeza becomes Association Cup winners a week before the end of the season
  - Académica do Porto Novo won their 9th Association Cup for Santo Antão
- December 10: the 2016-17 São Nicolau Super Cup may took place
- December 16:
  - the 2017-18 Maio Premier Division begins
  - the Académica do Porto Novo won their fourth straight Super Cup title for Santo Antão South Super Cup
  - SC Morabeza won their recent Association Cup winner for Brava
- December 22: the Santo Antão South Island Championships unofficially begins
- December 23:
  - the Brava Island Championships to begin
  - Ultramarina Tarrafal won their recent super cup title for São Nicolau
- December 29: the 2016-17 Boa Vista Island Cup to begin
- January 6: the 2017-18 São Nicolau Island Championships begins
- January 26: Santiago North Premier Division: For the first time, AD Ribeira Grande defeated the island's most powerful club Sporting Praia with the score 2-1
- February 13: Académica da Praia defeated Asa Grande 10-0 in the Santiago South Cup and made it the highest scoring match in the regional cup competitions in the nation
- February 17: Académica do Fogo defeated ABC de Patim 1-9 and made it the highest scoring match in the Fogo Premier Division to date, one of the highest in the archipelago, the match was later abandoned at the 85th minute as ABC had only six players in the field
- February 24:
  - Académica do Porto Novo made their eight straight win for Santo Antão South with their recent, an 0-5 win over Fiorentina Porto Novo. Académica won another title for the region and will be the second participant into the national championships
  - Sal Rei defeated Estância Baixo 0-7 and made it the highest scoring match in Boa Vista Island to date
- March 2: Santiago South Premier Division: Académica da Praia's point total reached 47 which is a club record over their 2004 and 2017 totals
- March 4: Celtic Praia's point total reached 39 which is a club record over their 2016 total
- March 10:
    - Fogo's Vulcânicos defeated Atlético Mosteiros 0-3 and achieved their third straight regional title (11th overall) and will be the third participant into the national championships
  - Santiago South Premier Division: Académica Praia defeated Eugênio Lima 4-0 and got their 50th point, a club record, in the region, it became third behind Sporting's 55 and Boavista's 51, both made in the previous season
  - Santiago South Premier Division: Celtic da Praia defeated Travadores 2-0 and got 13 wins and 42 goals, new club records
- March 14: 2018 Brava Island Cup begins
- March 17: Os Foguetões won their second championship title for Santo Antāo North and will appear in the national championships
- March 18: Académica had 53 points, Boavista's draw with Eugénio Lima that day has Académica an eight-point difference, with two rounds to go, Académica became listed as champions of Santiago South, they will have their next regional title in nine years
- March 21:
  - Santiago North's Scorpion Vermelho became champions and will win their fifth title and to appear at the national championships
  - São Nicolau's Belo Horizonte from Juncalinho in the east of the island became champions and will win their only title and will later make their first appearance at the national championships
- March 24:
  - Rosariense Clube won their cup title for Santo Antão North
- March 25:
  - Sport Sal Rei Club won their 11th title for Boa Vista, also it was their third straight and to appear at the national championships
  - SC Morabeza won their 10th title for Brava and to appear at the national championships
  - GD Palmeira de Santa Maria won their third title for Sal and to appear at the national championships, their next in 18 years
  - Fogo Premier Division: Mosteiros's Cutelinho failed to appear in the last of the two remaining matches with the last one with Nô Pintcha and will relegate for the first time to the Second Division next season
- March 27: Santiago South Premier Division: Travadores defeated Sporting Praia 2-1 in the final match of the season
- March 29: Académica do Porto Novo won their 13th Santo Antão South Cup title
- March 30: Santiago South Premier Division: Celtic defeated Académica 2-1 at the final round
- March 31:
  - Académica Fogo won another Fogo Cup title
  - SC Santa Maria won their only cup title for Sal
  - Sport Sal Rei Club won their 7th Boa Vista Cup title, also their fifth straight
  - Sporting Praia won another Santiago South Cup title
- April 1:
  - Barreirense FC won their third title for Maio and appearing at the national championships, their next in eight years
  - CS Mindelense won a record breaking 50th title for São Vicente and appearing at the national championships
- April 2: Académica Praia finished with a record 56 points and a record 18 wins, in point totals, third overall of any of the regional second tier competitions in the nation
- April 4: Onze Unidos won their cup title for Maio
- April 7:
  - the 2018 Cape Verdean Football Championships begins
  - Batuque won their sixth cup title for São Vicente
- April 8: Os Foguetões defeated Morabeza 0-1 in Nova Sintra and was the only victory at the first round
- April 14: Mindelense defeated Sal Rei 1-0 and took the lead in Group A
- April 22: GD Palmeira of Sal defeated Barreirense 4-2 and was the highest scoring match in the National Division, the sole match for a few weeks
- April 28: Barreirense defeated Palmeira 3-1 and is currently the second highest scoring match in the National Division
- April 29: Mindelense took the overall lead with 8 points and 4 goals, also are leaders in Group A, Os Foguetões were leader of Group B and Palmeira is leader of Group C, second placed clubs Vulcânicos and Académica Praia had the most points with 7 each
- May 13:
  - Belo Horizonte of São Nicolau defeated Brava's Morabeza 4-0 in Nova Sintra, made it one of two highest scoring matches of the season
  - The regular season of the National Division ended, Académica Praia, Os Foguetões and Palmeira Santa Maria qualified as leaders of each group, as well Mindelense (of Group A), qualified as the best of three second placed club
- May 19: the knockout phase of the National Championships begins
- May 20: FC Ultramarina won their 4th cup title for São Nicolau
- May 24: SC Morabeza won their recent cup title for Brava
- June 2: Académica da Praia won their only national championship title
- June 9: Sporting Praia won their only national cup title
- July 7: Botafogo of Fogo Island celebrated its 50th year of its foundation

== Island and regional competitions ==
=== Regional Championships ===
Competition	Champions	
Competition	Premier	Second
Boa Vista	Sport Sal Rei Club	
Brava	SC Morabeza	
Fogo	Vulcânicos	In progress
Maio	Barreirense FC	Figueirense
Sal	Palmeira Sta. Maria	Oásis Atlântico (Sta. Maria)
Santiago North	Scorpion Vermelho	Esperança Assomada
Santiago South	Académica da Praia	Relâmpago
Santo Antão North	CD Os Foguetões	Solpontense
Santo Antão South	Académica Porto Novo	
São Nicolau	Belo Horizonte Juncalinho	
São Vicente	CS Mindelense	Corinthians São Vicente

=== Regional Cups ===
Competition	Winners
Boa Vista	Sport Sal Rei Club
Brava	SC Morabeza
Fogo	Académica do Fogo
Maio	Onze Unidos
Sal	SC Santa Maria
Santiago South	Sporting Praia
Santo Antão North	Rosariense
Santo Antão South Zone	Académica do Porto Novo
São Nicolau	FC Ultramarina Tarrafal
São Vicente	Batuque FC

=== Regional Super Cups ===
The 2016-17 champion winner played with a 2016-17 cup winner (when a club won both, a second place club competed).

Competition	Winners
Boa Vista	Académica Operária
Brava	Not held
Fogo	Vulcânicos
Maio	No winner
Sal	Académico do Aeroporto
Santiago North	Not held
Santiago South	Sporting Praia
Santo Antão North	Rosariense
Santo Antão South	Académica do Porto Novo
São Nicolau	FC Ultramarina
São Vicente	FC Derby

=== Regional Opening Tournaments/Association Cups ===
Equivalent to a league cup in other countries.

Competition	Winners	
Competition	Premier	Second
Boa Vista	Onze Estrelas	Non-existent
Brava	SC Morabeza	Non-existent
Fogo	Not held	Non-existent
Maio	Not held	Non-existent
Sal	SC Santa Maria	SC Verdun
Santiago South Zone	Not held	Non-existent
Santo Antão South	Académica do Porto Novo	Non-existent
São Nicolau	Not held	Non-existent
São Vicente (Note: Known as the Association Cup)	Mindelense	Falcões do Norte

== Transfer deals ==
=== Summer-Fall transfer window ===
The September/October transfer window runs from the end of the previous season in September up to mid-October.

- (Cape Verde) João Paulino from Tchadense to Sporting Praia
- (Cape Verde) Blessed from Sporting Praia to Boavista Praia
- (Cape Verde) Panduru from Sporting Praia to Boavista Praia

== See also ==
- 2017 in Cape Verde
- 2018 in Cape Verde
- Timeline of Cape Verdean football
