= Football in Cape Verde =

Football
- Governing body: Cape Verdean Football Federation

International competitions
- Champions League; CAF Confederation Cup; Super Cup; FIFA Club World Cup; FIFA World Cup (National Team); African Cup of Nations (National Team)

Football is the most popular sport in Cape Verde. The league is divided into eleven divisions, seven of which are single-island and two of which are two-island divisions. Santiago and Santo Antão have had two zones since 2000. The football association is known as the Cape Verdean Football Federation; it became affiliated with CAF in 1986 and later with FIFA in 2001.

== Divisions ==
The divisions numbers eleven on nine islands, seven has an island league and two contains two zones each along with the cup, super cup and opening tournament competitions.

=== Island leagues ===
The light blue indicates a league having first and second divisions.

Boa Vista	Brava	Fogo	Maio	Sal	Santiago (North)
Santiago (South)	Santo Antão (Ribeira Grande)	Santo Antão (Porto Novo)	São Nicolau	São Vicente	

=== Regional cups ===
Boa Vista	Brava	Fogo	Maio	Sal	Santiago (North)
Santiago (South)	Santo Antão (single)	Santo Antão (North)	Santo Antão (Porto Novo)	São Nicolau	São Vicente

=== Regional super cups ===
Boa Vista	Brava	Fogo	Maio	Sal	Santiago (North)
Santiago (South)	Santo Antão (single)	Santo Antão (North)	Santo Antão (Porto Novo)	São Nicolau	São Vicente

=== Regional opening tournaments ===
Though equivalent to the League Cup used in other countries, Cape Verde is one of a few nations where it is labelled an "opening tournament". Some are also known as an Association Cup in Boa Vista and São Vicente. The light blue indicates a competition with first and second divisions; clubs in different divisions compete in the tournament for the same division (e.g. when a club is in a first or premier division, it participates in the first- or premier-division Opening Tournament or Association Cup).

Boa Vista	Brava	Fogo	Maio	Sal	
Santiago (South)	Santo Antão (single)	Santo Antão (North)	Santo Antão (Porto Novo)	São Nicolau	São Vicente

Italics indicate that the tournament is not held.

=== Regional Champion's Cup ===
Cape Verde are one of the most recent countries to have a Champion's Trophy competition labelled as the Champion's Cup. They were first held in 2016, Fogo, Maio and São Vicente are the only regions having the competition.

Fogo	Maio	São Vicente

== History ==
Football was first introduced to Cape Verde in the 1910s, beginning on the island of São Vicente before later spreading to Santiago and Sal. CS Mindelense, based in São Vicente, is the oldest club in Cape Verde, having been founded in 1919 and becoming an official member on 25 May 1922. The second oldest club is Sporting Clube da Praia, the first football club on Santiago Island, followed by FC Derby, founded on 5 August 1929. Two years later, Vitória FC was founded in the same city. Two of these clubs were among the first to be named after Portuguese clubs. Official competition did not begin until 1938, and Mindelense became the first club to win a regional title. The colonial title was then made official. Around the same time, the third island to have a football club was Sal, where SC Santa Maria was founded in the then island capital. In 1952, Sport Sal Rei Club became the first club on Boa Vista, making it the fourth island to have a football club.

=== National championships ===
The first all-island football competition began in the early 1950s and CS Mindelense won their first title in 1953, then, these competitions were territorial since it was an overseas province of Portugal until its independence in July 1975. Before, only the São Vicente competition existed which began in 1937 and lasted until 1953. A club from São Vicente and Santiago islands were its only entrants. Several competitions were cancelled including in 1954 and between 1956 and 1957. Another cancellations occurred when the last game before independence played and won their last title. Unlike other Portuguese overseas province at the time, Mindelense was the only club ever competed in the Portuguese Cup competition and participated twice in 1966. In 1971, the least of any overseas province (later autonomous provinces) in the Portuguese Empire. The first game after independence was in 1975 and their first title was claimed by CS Mindelense in 1976. The last two cancellations occurred in 1979, 1982 and 1986. From 1976, a club from any of the islands could participate.

In the early 1980s, the creation of more soccer teams led to creating a new division in the 1990s which became based by island except for one of them at the time there were only six and later seven, of which one of them qualified for the two groups. In the mid-1990s, the division were divided into nine which qualified into three groups, A, B and C, and now eleven new insular zones were added for Santiago and Santo Antão and Group C was eliminated reduced to its two-grouping system. For several times, the champion would be decided on the highest number of points and goals in 2001 and 2002, the highest number of points ever was 19, nine clubs took part in the national championships up to 2003. Sporting Praia holds the highest number of goals scored in the regular season and the total number of 35 in 2005. Also in the season, Sporting Praia scored 13–0 over Desportivo Estância Baixo making it the highest scoring match in the national championships and still stands today. Zé di Tchétcha scored the highest goals in the championships numbering 14. The champion of the year would complete in the following year's national competition which began in 2005 and raised the total of national championship clubs to twelve, a number stands today. The 2009 season would be the first final competition that featured two clubs from a single island (Santiago) or city (Praia), it would held again in 2010 and recently in 2015 (Derby and Mindelense from Mindelo in the island of São Vicente), the most final match features with two of the clubs was with Sporting Praia and Mindelense four times (in 1977, 1988, the next was Mindelense and Botafogo (in 1976, 1980 and 1981) three times and Mindelense and Académica do Porto Novo (in 2012 and 2016). Sporting Praia and CS Mindelense each won four consecutive titles, the first Sporting Praia between 2006 and 2009 and Mindelense since 2013. In the 2017 season which starts in mid-May, the triangular system would be returned and will feature four clubs in each of the three groups, the remainder each champion of the regional association (some of them having its own Premier/First Division) and will have the final phase, the previous season's champion qualified and Mindelense will be placed in Group A.

CS Mindelense holds the most national titles won numbering twelve.

=== Island/Regional competitions ===
In around 1995, Santiago's South zone became the first zone ever to feature a first and second divisions, followed by Fogo and São Vicente in 2008, Northern Santo Antão in 2013, Sal in 2014 and Maio, the most recent in 2015. Northern Santiago league is the only league to have the first and final phase competitions, the north and northcentral groups existed in the early years and in around 2010, the group system were eliminated and up to 2015, all 13 clubs competed in the first phase and the top four elevates to the second phase and the winner was decided on the highest number of points and goals. Garridos is the only club to change regional divisions from Northern to Southern Santiago in 2011 as its location is in the south of the island. In the early 2010s, instead of two clubs directly relegating, the promotional/unelevated matches were introduced and a two-match system are featured in the regional championships of Fogo, Santiago North and South (not in 2016) Zones and São Vicente, the club with the most points either stays or be promoted, the club with the least either be promoted or not be promoted in the following season.

The most clubs of any island/regional league is Southern Santiago, the fewest is Brava, Maio once held it until 2015.

In the early 2010s, Cape Verde would contain around a hundred football clubs in 11 regional competitions, some of them with two divisions. In 2014, six new football clubs were added to the Sal Island League and the second division was formed., a year later in 2015, nearly all of the clubs (one of them was suspended) returned to the competition in the Santiago North Zone, some new clubs were added and the two division system were established, the regional league featured a 26 match season and saw some records in goals, wins and points got by some clubs, the 2015-16 Santiago North Zone season was the longest regional season of any of the regional leagues in the country, Varandinha was the 2015/16 winner with a record number of points numbering 63 succeeding the South Zone's Sporting Praia's total of 49 which was in 2005, the South Zone of Santiago was the second longest and the third longest being Fogo. Until 2015, Maio had the shortest regional season of any of the regional leagues in the country, Brava has the shortest since that time. The length of the season of the Santiago North Zone is now the same as the Santiago South Zone. Some of the second division matches takes places in May and up to June especially Santiago North.

On 7 February 2017, over the pay that some referees need for rounds 17 and 26 of the previous season and the rounds of this season, the Santiago North Zone season was postponed for two weeks, the regional competition resumed on 25 February as the referees were paid four days earlier by its sponsorship of two telecommunications companies, one of them was Cabo Verde Telecom and the municipalities where the clubs are based.

Other records includes best season which Académica Porto Novo had achieved in 2012 that were all wins. The longest unbeaten streak of any of the island leagues was Académica Porto Novo which lasted around 50 to 60 matches without a loss that lasted between 2012 and 23 April 2016, the record also ended on away matches which the club lost to CS Marítimo 2–1, the record continues on home matches. Académica also has a record combined with Cup and Super Cup matches but not the Santo Antão Cup which was the first cup loss that Académica Porto Novo had/. The second is Mindelense that lasted from 29 March 2014 to 16 April 2016 with the loss to Amarante, along with home (started from 12 January) and away to matches (up to 24 April 2016 with the loss to Derby).

Several seasons had a club or two fielded ineligible players for a part or all of the season, such as FC Ultramarina and SC Atlético in the 2005 São Nicolau season and recently Académica do Mindelo for five matches with a fake goalkeeper for the 2016–17 season. For some seasons, there were championship disputes in one of the region, São Nicolau in 2005 and one season, and Santiago North Premier Division including Scorpion Vermelho and Varandinha in 2016 and AJAC da Calheta and Benfica Santa Cruz in 2017.

=== Cup, Super Cup, Opening Tournament and Champions' Trophy competitions ===
The opening tournaments as well as its insular cup and super cup competition were added in 1985 in the island of Santiago, later in 1999 in most of the nine islands, Boa Vista created theirs in 2009, Brava and Maio were the last one in which the cup and super cup competition were created in 2011. The Super Cup competitions features a regional champion and a regional cup winner. In some seasons when a club wins a championship and a cup title, the second place cup title participates. Santiago North Zone does not have these competitions, not even the opening tournament. The Opening Tournament (equivalent to a League Cup) only features one portion where a club competes once with a different club of the two divisions, in São Vicente (including the adjacent islands), it is known as the Association Cup and features two divisions with one portion where a club competes once with a different club, these take place at the start of the season a month (or two) before the regional championships begin. The one on Boa Vista island created before the cup and super cup competitions were created in around 2007. The Championship Trophy was first implemented in 2016 which features the champion of the regional Premier and Second Divisions in several regional championships. The first one was the São Vicente Champions' Cup held on October 15 which featured Mindelense and Ribeira Bote, Mindelense won their first and only title. Maio and Fogo also held their first editions in November where Real Marítimo (Second Division) and Vulcânicos (Premier Division) won. There are three in Cape Verde.

National cup competitions includes the main Cape Verdean Cup which began in 2007 and was held for four seasons, the 2008 and 2011 competition were cancelled and since 2013 and the Cape Verdean Independence Cup. The Cape Verdean Super Cup was held in 2013 between a championship and a cup winner, Sporting Praia faced Onze Unidos and Sporting Praia claimed their only title, the 2014 edition was challenged with the country's second greatest team Sporting Praia. Boavista Praia holds the most national cup titles numbering two.

== CAF competitions ==
The winner of the national championship takes part in the CAF Champions League the following season, the second place club takes part in the CAF Confederation Cup, the first was in 1992 and their recent was Sporting Clube da Praia in 2009. For some years, a champion and a second place club did not appear in the African competition especially between 2002 and 2005, between 2010 and 2015. Once Sporting Praia, a non-champion took part in the 2000 edition. The second place took part in the CAF Cup and the CAF Winner's Cup, from its merger in 2004 until 2015, neither took part in the CAF Confederation Cup. CS Mindelense is uncertain to qualify into the 2017 CAF Champions League. As the Cape Verdean Cup was created in 2007, no cup winner took part in the Confederation Cup, as the Cape Verdean Cup was cancelled since 2013, it is uncertain that a club will qualify in the 2017 CAF Confederation Cup. A total of six clubs participated including Sporting Praia, Mindelense, FC Derby, Académica do Sal, Boavista Praia and Travadores, only one club SC Atlético was disqualified due to that the football federation did not name the entrant on time.

== Seasons in Cape Verdean football ==
2000s	2000–01	2001–02	2002–03	2003–04	2004–05	2005–06	2006–07	2007–08	2008–09	2009–10
2010s:	2010–11	2011–12	2012–13	2013–14	2014–15	2015–16	2016–17	2017–18		

=== National championships ===
1970s:							1976	1977	1978	
1980s:	1980	1981		1983	1984	1985	1986		1988	1989
1990s:	1990	1991	1992	1993	1994	1995	1996	1997	1998	1999
2000s:	2000	2001	2002	2003	2004	2005	2006	2007	2008	2009
2010s:	2010	2011	2012	2013	2014	2015	2016	2017		

== Stadiums in Cape Verde ==
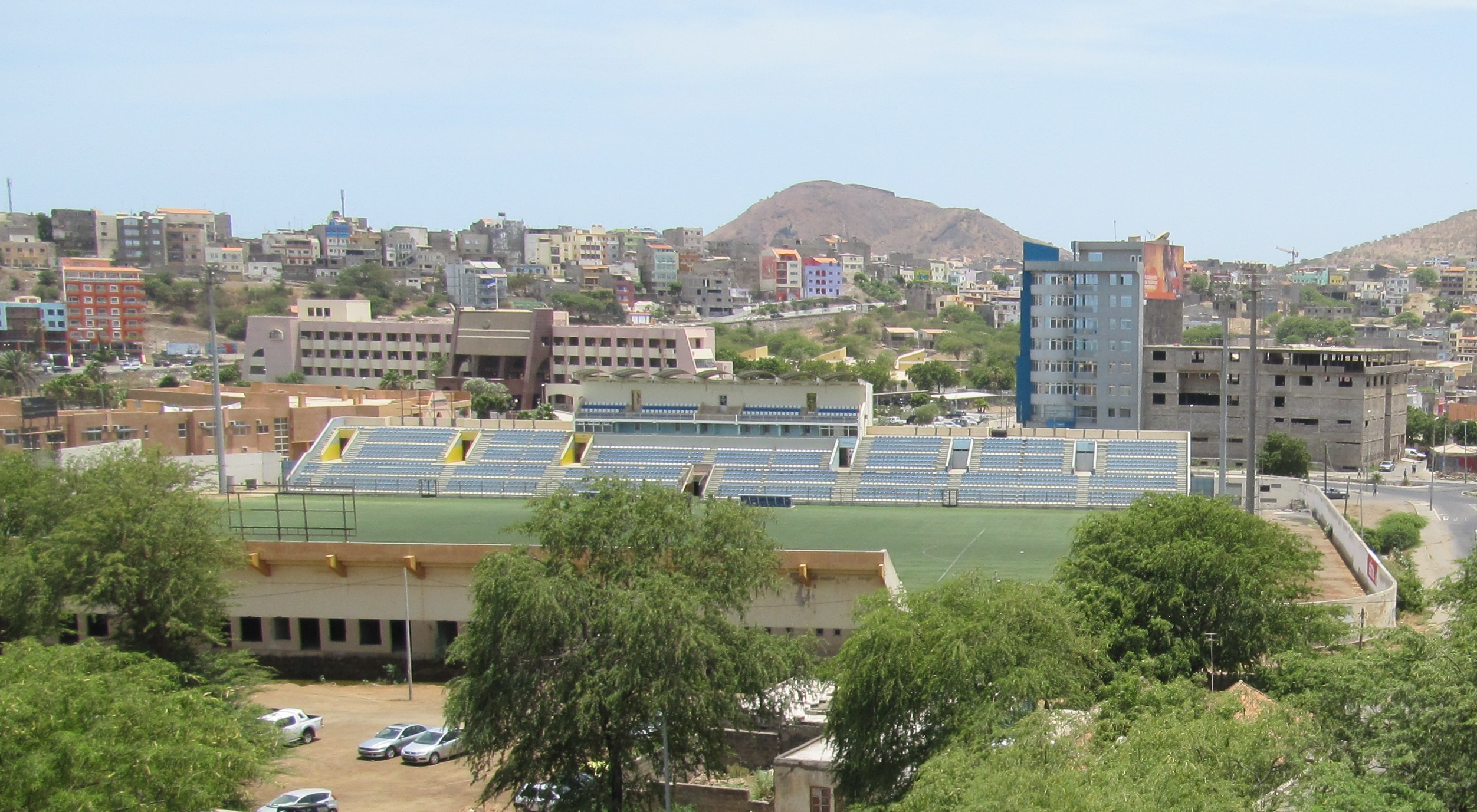
Estádio da Várzea in Praia on the island of Santiago

The most used stadium in the country is the Estádio da Várzea which is located in Praia, it has a capacity of 8,000. The Estádio Nacional de Cabo Verde is the largest stadium by capacity in the country.

Stadium	Capacity	City
Estádio Nacional de Cabo Verde	15,000	Praia
Estádio da Várzea	8,000	Praia

== Attendances ==
The average attendance per top-flight football league season and the club with the highest average attendance:

Season	League average	Best club	Best club average
2023	388	Mindelense	781

Source: League page on Wikipedia

== See also ==
- List of football clubs in Cape Verde
- Football records in Cape Verde - a list of national and regional league records in the country
