= 2012–13 in Cape Verdean football =

Football in Cape Verde
- Season: 2012–13

Men's football
- 2013 Cape Verdean Football Championships: CS Mindelense

== Diary of the season ==
In the 2012–13 season of competitive football (soccer) in Cape Verde:

- September 9 - Corinthians São Vicente celebrated its 25th anniversary of foundation
- September 26 - Alexandre Alhinho becomes manager of Académica do Mindelo
- November 18: Académica do Fogo celebrated their 50th anniversary
- December 15: Académica da Praia celebrated their 50th anniversary
- GD Palmeira won the Sal Super Cup
- The 2013 Santo Antão North Zone Island League was the first season that the Second Division was added, Beira-Mar, Irmãos Unidos and Janela appeared in the lowest division
- Paulense won the Santo Antão North Zone Cup
- Académica do Porto Novo won the Santo Antão South Zone Cup
- Batuque won the São Vicente Cup
- Sport Sal Rei Club won the Boa Vista (Bubista) Cup
- Academico 83 won the Maio (Djarmai) Cup
- GD Palmeira won the Sal Cup
- CD Travadores won the Santiago South Zone Cup
- Paulense won the Santo Antão North Zone Cup
- Académica do Porto Novo won the Santo Antão South Zone Cup
- FC Ultramarina won the São Nicolau Cup
- CS Mindelense won the São Vicente Cup
- May 5: all qualifiers listed into the Cape Verdean football championships.
- May 11: Cape Verdean Football Championships begun
- May 23: Juventude da Furna won the Brava Cup after beating Sporting Brava 3-0, as the Cape Verdean Cup was cancelled, it did not qualify
- May 26: Desportivo Praia defeated Ultramarina 1-4 and became the highest scoring match of the season and the largest goal difference for a week
- June 1:
  - Mindelense defeated Ultramarina 4-0 and made it the largest goal difference of the season and became the second highest scoring match
  - Solpontense defeated Académico 83 with four goals and became the third and fourth highest scoring match for each clubs for the season
- June 9:
  - Desportivo Praia defeatred Juventude Furna 1-4 and became the fourth highest scoring match of the season
  - Regular season ends, Sporting Praia, Mindelense, Acadèmicas from Fogo and Porto Novo and Desportivo advanced into the semis
- June 22: the Semifinals started
- June 29: Mindelense and Académica Porto Novo qualified into the finals
- July 13: CS Mindelense claimed their ninth title
- August 3: Académica do Sal celebrated its 50th anniversary

== Final standings ==
=== Cape Verdean Football Championships ===
Desportivo da Praia had the most points numbered thirteen and scored twelve goals, Mindelense was second in Group A. In Group B, Académicas Fogo and Porto Novo, the first had eleven points and the second had ten. Mindelense advanced to the finals with two over Académica Fogo while Académica Porto Novo had two over Desportivo Praia. With a total of five goals scored in the two matches, Mindelense won their ninth title

=== Group A ===
Pos	Team	Pld	W	D	L	GF	GA	GD	Pts
1	Desportivo da Praia	5	4	1	0	12	2	+10	13
2	CS Mindelense	5	3	1	1	9	4	+5	10
3	Académico do Aeroporto	5	2	3	0	3	1	+2	9
4	FC Ultramarina	5	1	1	3	5	12	-7	4
5	Onze Estrelas	5	0	2	3	4	9	-5	2
6	Juventude da Furna	5	0	2	4	4	8	-5	2

=== Group B ===
Pos	Team	Pld	W	D	L	GF	GA	GD	Pts
1	Académica do Fogo	5	3	2	0	4	0	+4	11
2	Académica do Porto Novo	5	3	1	1	15	1	+4	10
3	Sporting Clube da Praia	5	2	3	0	6	3	+3	0
4	Solpontense FC	5	1	3	1	6	6	0	6
5	Academico 83	5	0	2	3	5	11	-6	2
6	Scorpions Vermelho	5	0	1	4	1	6	-5	1

==== Final Stages ====
Semi-Finals				Finals
CS Mindelense	1	1	2
Académica do Fogo	1	0	1	CS Mindelense	3	2	5
Académica do Porto Novo	3	0	3	Académica do Porto Novo	0	2	2
Desportivo da Praia	1	0	1

Leading goalscorer: Dukinha (CS Mindelense) - 6 goals

=== Cape Verdean Super Cup ===
The Cape Verdean Super Cup took place in late 2012 and featured the Onze Unidos and the champion Sporting Clube da Praia. It was one of the recent to have its own super cup competitions added.

=== Island or regional competitions ===
==== Regional Championships ====
Competition	Winners	
Competition	Premier	Second
Boa Vista	Onze Estrelas	
Brava	Juventude da Furna	
Fogo	Académica do Fogo	União de São Lourenço
Maio	Academico 83	
Sal	Académico do Aeroporto	
Santiago North Zone	Scorpion Vermelho	
Santiago South Zone	Sporting Clube da Praia	Vitória FC da Praia
Santo Antão North Zone	Solpontense FC	Beira-Mar
Santo Antão South Zone	Académica do Porto Novo	
São Nicolau	FC Ultramarina	
São Vicente	CS Mindelense	Ribeira Bote

==== Regional Cups ====
Competition	Winners
Boa Vista	Sport Sal Rei Club
Brava	Juventude da Furna
Fogo	Unknown
Maio	Académico 83
Sal	GD Palmeira
Santiago South Zone	CD Travadores
Santo Antão North Zone	Paulense
Santo Antão South Zone	Académica do Porto Novo
São Nicolau	SC Atlético
São Vicente	CS Mindelense

==== Regional Super Cups ====
The 2012 champion winner played with a 2012 cup winner (when a club won both, a second place club competed).

Competition	Winners
Boa Vista	Juventude do Norte
Brava	Juventude da Furna
Fogo	Valência
Maio	Unknown
Sal	GD Palmeira
Santiago South	ADESBA
Santo Antão North	Paulense
Santo Antão South	Académica do Porto Novo
São Nicolau	FC Ultramarina
São Vicente	Batuque FC

==== Regional Opening Tournaments ====
Competition	Winners
Boa Vista	Académica Operária
Brava	Sporting Clube da Brava
Fogo	
Maio	Académico 83
Sal	Académica do Sal
Santiago South Zone	
Santo Antão North Zone	Paulense
Santo Antão South Zone	Académica do Porto Novo
São Nicolau	Not held
São Vicente	CS Mindelense

== Transfer deals ==
=== Summer-Fall transfer window ===
The September/October transfer window runs from the end of the previous season in September up to October.

- (Cape Verde) Ballack from Sporting Praia to (Portugal) Oriental
- (Cape Verde) Calú from CS Mindelense to (Angola) Progresso Sambizanga
- (Cape Verde) Patrick Andrade (or Patrick) from Sporting Praia to Desportivo da Praia

=== In early and mid 2013 ===
- (Senegal) Théo Mendy from Sporting Praia to (Portugal) Boavista Lisbon
- (Cape Verde) Patrick from Desportivo da Praia to Benfica da Praia

== See also ==
- 2012 in Cape Verde
- 2013 in Cape Verde
- Timeline of Cape Verdean football
