= 2015–16 in Cape Verdean football =

Football in Cape Verde
- Season: 2015–16

Men's football
- 2016 Cape Verdean Football Championships: CS Mindelense

The 2015–16 season was the season of competitive football (soccer) in Cape Verde.

== Diary of the season ==
- João Lopes Rodrígues became chairman of Solpontense
- September 4 - Daniel de Jesus became president of CS Mindelense succeeding Adilson Nascimento
- September 12 - Orlando Delgago became president of Rosariense Clube, a club in the Santo Antão North Zone's Second Division
- September 16 - Desportivo de Assomada celebrated its 25th anniversary of the foundation of the club
- September 23:
  - Portuguese coach Joel de Castro who was coaching Spartak d'Aguadinha started to coach Boavista FC Praia
  - Jaime Veiga became coach of Spartak d'Aguadinha
- October:
  - David Brito succeeded Nelson Figueiredo as coach of FC Juventude in Sal
  - Janito Carvalho was again coach of Sporting Clube da Praia
  - Domingo Gomes succeeded Djulinano Santos as president of Sport Clube Verdun of Sal, Dujlinano became manager of FC Juventude of Sal
  - Marineida da Graça became the first female president of FC Ultramarina
- October 2 - Lúcio Antunes was transferred from Progresso Associação do Sambizanga, an Angolan football club to Académico do Aeroporto as coach, he succeeded Carlos Moniz
- October 24:
  - Amarildo Baessa was elected president of Cutelinho
  - Mario Pinto became coach of Botafogo FC of Fogo
- October 29 - Djo Bracó succeeded Osvaldinho Rocha as president of Onze Estrelas
- November 6 - Osvaldinho Silva Lopes succeeded Elísio Silva as coach or president
- November 7:
  - The 2015-16 Fogo Island League begins
  - Mindelense won their third title for the São Vicente SuperCup after defeating Amarante
- November 13 - the 2015-16 Santiago Island League (South) begins
- November 15 - Both Académica and Sporting Praia took the number one lead in the Santiago South Premier Division with 3 points each
- November 22 - Eugénio Lima took the number one spot for Santiago South with 4 points
- November 29 - Celtic da Praia defeated Os Garridos 1-3 and took the number one spot for Santiago South with 7 points
- December 3 - GDRC Fiorentina announced to return after a three-year absence from the Southern Santo Antão Island League to financial concerns their first match of the season was against Lajedos
- December 12
  - The 2015-16 Santiago Island League (North) begins, the Second Division was restored after a nearly ten-year hiatus
  - Gaming schedules for the Santo Antão North Zone's new season finished
- December 13:
  - Académica da Praia took the number one position and kept it for the next seven rounds for Santiago South
  - Académica do Porto Novo won the Santo Antão South Zone Super Cup title for the season
- Late-December: Académica do Porto Novo won their first and only title for the first edition of the Santo Antão Island Super Cup
- January 9
  - the 2015-16 Brava Island League begins
  - the 2015-16 Santo Antão Island League (South) begins, one of the first matches of the season was Fiorenta and Lajedos, Fiorentina's next match in over three years
- Mid-January - The first ever single island Santo Antão Cup took place
- January 16
  - 2015-16 Boa Vista Island League begins
  - 2015-16 Santo Antão Island League (North) begins
  - 2015-16 São Nicolau Island League begins
  - 2015-16 São Vicente Island League begins
- January 17 - Batuque defeated Amarante 2-0 and took the number one lead for the São Vicente Premier Division for a week
- January 23 - the 2015-16 Maio Island League begins
- January 31 - CD Falcões do Norte defeated Salamansa FC 0-4 and took the number one spot for São Vicente for two weeks
- February 6:
  - 2015-16 Sal Island League begins with two additional clubs totalling eight
  - FC Derby defeated SC Farense 1-3 and took the number one spot for a week for São Vicente with 5 points
- February 13:
  - Boavista Praia took the number one spot for Santiago South with 28 points
  - Mindelense took the number one spot for São Vicente for the rest of the season
- February 20 - ADESBA took the number one spot for Santiago South for just four rounds
- March 20–24: No sports competitions due to the Parliamentary elections that took place
- March 25 - Desportivo Praia defeated Vitória da Praia 4-0 and took the number one spot for Santiago South for a week
- March 27: Brava Island League: Juventude Furna defeated Benfica 0-16 and made it the highest scoring match of any of the island leagues for the season in the nation
- April 3:
  - Académica Fogo defeated São Lourenço 1-12 and made it the highest scoring match of the Fogo Premier Division and was second of any of the island leagues for the season in the nation
  - Sporting Praia took the number one spot for Santiago South for a week
- April 10 - Desportivo Praia retook the number one spot for Santiago South for a week
- April 11 - Sporting Clube da Brava won their third consecutive and recent title for Brava and qualified into the national championships
- April 16 - Mindelense's record of 34 matches without a loss at the regional championships ended as the club lost to Amarante 2-0, their next loss in two years
- April 17:
  - Sinagoga, the village's club located between Ribeira Grande and Paul was listed as regional champions for the first time
  - Sporting Praia regained the number one spot for Santiago South for a week
- April 20 - ABC de Patim returned to the regional premier division in the following season after winning the promotional final match
- April 21 - Académico do Aeroporto won their fourteenth title for Sal and their second consecutive title and again qualified into the national championships
- April 23:
  - Académica do Porto Novo's approximate 50 match (5 year) record without a loss at the regional championships finished as the club lost to Marítimo 2-0, also it was a record numbering about 60 combining with the South Zone's cup and super cup matches and not with the single Santo Antão Cup as they lost one match. At home matches, the record continues.
  - Académica do Porto Novo won their tenth title for Southern Santo Antão (eleventh of a combined total with the former Santo Antão Championships) and their sixth consecutive, one of around six clubs to win six consecutive titles in history of any of the regional leagues in Cape Verde, the club qualified into the national championships
- April 24:
  - Mindelense's long record without a home loss at the regionals numbering 18 in the regionals came to an end after losing to Derby 0-1.
  - Desportivo Praia retook the number one spot for Santiago South and held it for the last three weeks of the season
  - CS Mindelense won their record forty-eight title and qualified into the national championships
  - Sinagoga won their first and only title for Northern Santo Antão and qualified into the national championships for the first time
  - Vulcânicos won their ninth and recent title and qualified into the national championships
- Lajedos was the first cup winner of the single Santo Antão Island Cup
- Académica do Porto Novo won their fourth consecutive cup title for Santo Antão South
- Paulense won their cup title for Santo Antão North
- May 1:
  - Sport Sal Rei Club won their ninth title for Boa Vista, their next in five years and qualified into the national championships
  - Salamansa FC won their first and only cup title for São Vicente
- May 4: Original date of the Santiago South Cup finals, it was rescheduled to April 15, 2017 and GDRC Delta won their only cup title for Santiago South
- May 7 - SC Atlético won their seventh title for São Nicolau and qualified into the national championships
- May 8 - All qualifiers into the national championship listed including Académico do Aeroporto, winner of Sal, Desportivo da Praia won their regional title in 26 years, the first as the divided Santiago South Zone, Desportivo returned in four years, their last entry was a second place club as the 2013 island champion Sporting was also national champion in 2012, Varandinha, champion of Santiago North competed for the first time and Académico 83 of Maio
- May 13 - A day before the national championships started, the match between Desportivo Praia and Varandinha was rescheduled to June 1 due to some rivalry
- May 14 - The National Championships begun
- June 1: Originally for May 15, the rescheduled Desportivo Praia-Varandinha match took place and Varandinha defeated that club 1-3
- June 4: Mindelense defeated Sal Rei 5-2 and made it the highest scoring match of the season
- June 12 - Regular season ended and Mindelense, Derby and Académica Porto Novo qualified into the semis, also Varandinha qualified for the first time
- June 18 - Playoffs began
- June 25: With a total of six goals scored in two matches between Mindelense and Varandinha, Mindelense became the first of two clubs to qualify for the finals
- June 26: Académica Porto Novo scored the first two goals in the first half of the second leg before Derby did in the second half, Académica Porto Novo qualified into the finals under the away goals rule
- July 2: The finals began, and was the last finals match featuring two clubs from the same island chain, Académica Porto Novo defeated Mindelense 0-1
- July 9 - The second leg of the finals began and was the last finals matches at the championships, Mindelense defeated Académica 0-1, as each had a total of a goal each, it went into extra time and then the penalty shootouts where Mindelense won 4-5 and claimed a record twelfth title and won four consecutive titles, the last club who won four consecutive national titles was Sporting Praia.

== Final standings ==
=== Cape Verdean Football Championships ===
Two number one clubs finished first and were FC Derby (of Group A) and CS Mindelense (of Group), Derby had a draw and Mindelense had two, neither had any losses, Derby scored 8 and Mindelense scored 11, along with GD Varandinha for the first time and Académica do Porto Novo. Mindelense and Académica do Porto Novo (on away goals) advanced while Varandinha and Derby lost. In four years, Mindelense again competed with Académica do Porto Novo and a goal in each of the two matches, second consecutive time that both clubs had the same goal totals, again Mindelense won 4-3 in penalty kicks in the last match and claimed their twelfth and recent national title.

==== Group A ====
Pos	Team	Pld	W	D	L	GF	GA	GD	Pts
1	FC Derby	5	4	1	0	8	2	+6	13
2	GD Varandinha	5	3	1	1	9	4	+5	10
3	Desportivo da Praia	5	2	1	2	7	6	+1	7
4	Sporting Clube da Praia	5	2	0	3	6	7	-1	6
5	SC Atlético	5	1	1	3	5	10	-5	4
6	CD Sinagoga	5	0	2	3	4	10	-6	2

==== Group B ====
Pos	Team	Pld	W	D	L	GF	GA	GD	Pts
1	CS Mindelense (C)	5	3	2	0	11	3	+8	11
2	Académica do Porto Novo	5	3	2	0	6	1	+5	11
3	Académico do Aeroporto	5	2	1	2	4	$	0	7
4	Académico 83	5	1	2	2	5	8	-3	5
5	Sport Sal Rei Club	5	1	1	3	8	11	-3	4
6	Vulcânicos	5	1	0	4	2	9	-7	3

==== Final Stages ====
Semi-Finals				Finals
FC Derby	0	2	2
Académica do Porto Novo	0	2	2	1	CS Mindelense	0	1 (4)	1 (4)
CS Mindelense	4	2	6	2	Académica do Porto Novo	1	0 (3)	1 (3)
GD Varandinha	1	0	1

== Island or regional competitions ==
=== Regional Championships ===
Competition	Winners	
Competition	Premier	Second
Boa Vista	Sport Sal Rei Club	
Brava	Sporting	
Fogo	Vulcânicos	ABC de Patim
Maio	Académico 83	Real Marítimo
Sal	Académico do Aeroporto	Gaviões
Santiago North Zone	Varandinha	Juventus Assomada
Santiago South Zone	Desportivo da Praia	Benfica (Note: Also known as Benfiquinha)
Santo Antão North Zone	Sinagoga	Santo Crucifíxio
Santo Antão South Zone	Académica do Porto Novo	
São Nicolau	SC Atlético	
São Vicente	CS Mindelense	Ribeira Bote

=== Regional Cups ===
Competition	Winners
Boa Vista	Sport Sal Rei Club
Brava	Sporting Brava
Fogo	Not played
Maio	Académico 83
Sal	Juventude
Santiago South Zone	GDRC Delta (Note: Played in 2017)
Santo Antão (single)	Lajedos
Santo Antão North Zone	Paulense
Santo Antão South Zone	Académica do Porto Novo
São Nicolau	AJAT'SN
São Vicente	Salamansa

=== Regional Super Cups ===
The 2015 champion winner played with a 2015 cup winner (when a club won both, a second place club competed).

Competition	Winners
Boa Vista	Sport Sal Rei Club
Brava	Unknown
Fogo	Unknown
Maio	Onze Unidos
Sal	Académico do Aeroporto
Santiago South	Boavista FC
Santo Antão Cup (single)	Académica do Porto Novo
Santo Antão North	Paulense
Santo Antão South	Académica do Porto Novo
São Nicolau	FC Belo Horizonte
São Vicente	CS Mindelense

=== Regional Opening Tournaments ===
Competition	Winners
Boa Vista	Académica Operária
Brava	no competition, cancelled
Fogo	
Maio	
Sal	Académica do Sal
Santiago South Zone	Desportivo da Praia
Santo Antão North Zone	Paulense
Santo Antão South Zone	no competition, cancelled
São Nicolau	FC Belo Horizonte
São Vicente (Note: Known as the Association Cup)	Amarante (Premier Division)

== Transfer deals ==
=== Summer-Fall transfer window ===
The September/October transfer window runs from the end of the previous season in September up to mid-October.

- (Cape Verde) Kelvi (Kelvi Lévi Lopes) from Académica Praia to Sporting Praia
- (Cape Verde) Moisés Lopes from Boavista to Académica Praia
- (Cape Verde) M.Teixeira from Travadores to Desportivo Praia
- (Cape Verde) Maldini from Travadores to Desportivo Praia
- (Cape Verde) Rodi from (Romania) Poli Timişoara to Sporting Praia
- (Cape Verde) Xibaka from CS Mindelense to Boavista Praia
- (Nigeria) Ezeijofor Ezenwa from Travadores to Celtic Praia

== See also ==
- 2015 in Cape Verde
- 2016 in Cape Verde
- Timeline of Cape Verdean football
