= Boa Vista Regional Football Association =

- Founded: 1978
- Location: Sal Rei
- Affiliations: Cape Verdean Football Federation
- Website: Official website

Boa Vista Regional Football Association (Portuguese: Associação Regional de Futebol da Boa Vista, abbreviation: ARFBV,) is a football (soccer) association covering the island of Boa Vista . It is headquartered in the island capital of Sal Rei The association are one of six in Cape Verde that covers only one municipality. It is the sublevel of the Capeverdean Football Federation.

The championship only has a single division where eight clubs participate, a club with the most points promotes into the regional premier division the following season while the last placed club from the regional premier division relegates into the second division the following season. Uncertain that the regional championship will have two divisions as a possible club addition could occur. It is likely that a single level competition is going to be kept for the following season.

== History ==
The association was founded in 1978.

In the 1990s, it was one of eight that had only a single level football competition.

Since 2015, the members of the association are the remaining four associations that contains only a single level football competition.

== Organization ==
The association also organizes and functions the regional championships, the Cup, the Super Cup and the Opening Tournament, commonly as the Association Cup (equivalent to the two-tier cup in other countries which includes the League Cup). The association has eight registered clubs, the regional champion competes in the National Championships each season.

- Boa Vista Island Championships

== Registered clubs ==
The region's registered clubs as of late 2015 include.

Club	Location	Founded	Registered
Académica Operária	Sal Rei	1977	1978
África Show	Rabil	1976	1978
Desportivo Estância Baixo	Estância Baixo	1986	2004
Juventude do Norte	Fundo das Figueiras		
Onze Estrelas	Bofareira	1976	2010
Sport Sal Rei Club	Sal Rei	1952	1992
Sanjoanense	Fundo das Figueiras		
Sporting Boa Vista	Sal Rei	1956	1978
