= History of football in Cape Verde =

This article is about the history of football (soccer) in Cape Verde.

== About its history ==
Football (or soccer) was first introduced around the 1910s, the first area where it was introduced was the island of São Vicente, later it was introduced to the island of Santiago, then Sal. CS Mindelense based in the island of São Vicente is the oldest club in Cape Verde founded in 1919 and became official member on May 25, 1922, soccer was first played, the second oldest is GS Castilho (February) and Santiago Island's first football club named Sporting Clube da Praia (December 5) founded in 1923, then FC Derby founded on August 5, 1929, two years later in Praia, Vitória FC was founded, two of the clubs were the first named after a Portuguese club. GD Amarantes of Mindelo was founded in 1936. Its first venues were built, first Estádio da Fontinha in Mindelo (now Estádio Municipal Adérito Sena), then Estádio Municipal da Praia (now Estádio da Várzea). Official competition did not start until 1938 and Mindelense was the first club to win a regional title, the colonial title was then official. Also at the same time, the third island to have a football club was Sal where SC Santa Maria was founded in the then island capital, later in 1953, the fourth island to have a club would be Boa Vista with Sport Sal Rei Club, the fifth was Fogo with Vulcânicos, in 1956 Santo Antão was the sixth and created Sporting Clube de Carvoeiros (now do Porto Novo). São Nicolau was the seventh to have a club with FC Ultramarina founded in 1966. Maio was eight to have one with Onze Unidos in 1979 and Brava was the last with Morabeza founded in 1980.

== National championships ==
The first all-island football competition began in the early 1950s and CS Mindelense won their first title in 1953, then, these competitions were territorial since it was an overseas province of Portugal until its independence in July 1975. Before, only the São Vicente competition existed which began in 1937 and lasted until 1953. A club from São Vicente and Santiago islands were its only entrants. Several competitions were cancelled including in 1954 and between 1956 and 1957. Another cancellations occurred when the last game before independence played and won their last title. Unlike other Portuguese overseas province at the time, Mindelense was the only club ever competed in the Portuguese Cup competition and participated twice in 1966 in 1971, the least of any overseas province (later autonomous provinces) in the Portuguese Empire. Mindelense won the most number of provincial titles numbering seven, second was Académica do Mindelo with three and third were Sporting Praia and Travadores with two.

The first game after independence was in 1975 and their first title was claimed by CS Mindelense in 1976. The last two cancellations occurred in 1979, 1982 and 1986. For a decade, the champion could compete in the following season and was the first time it was done. From 1976, a club from any of the islands could participate.

In the early 1980s, the creation of more soccer teams led to creating a new division in the 1990s which became based by island except for one of them at the time there were only six and later seven, of which one of them qualified for the two groups. In the mid-1990s, the division were divided into nine which qualified into three groups, A, B and C, and now eleven new insular zones were added for Santiago and Santo Antão and Group C was eliminated reducing to its two-grouping system. For several times, the champion would be decided on the highest number of points and goals in 2001 and 2002, the highest number of points ever was 19, nine clubs took part in the national championships up to 2003. From 2004, again in a decade, a Sporting Praia holds the highest number of goals scored in the regular season and the total number of 35 in 2005. Also in the season, Sporting Praia scored 13–0 over Desportivo Estância Baixo making it the highest scoring match in the national championships and still stands today. Zé di Tchétcha scored the highest goals in the championships numbering 14. The champion of the year would complete in the following year's national competition which began in 2005 and raised the total of national championship clubs to twelve, a number stands today. The 2009 season would be the first final competition that featured two clubs from a single island (Santiago) or city (Praia), it would held again in 2010 and recently in 2015 (Derby and Mindelense from Mindelo in the island of São Vicente), the most final match features with two of the clubs was with Sporting Praia and Mindelense four times (in 1977, 1988, the next was Mindelense and Botafogo (in 1976, 1980 and 1981) three times and Mindelense and Académica do Porto Novo (in 2012 and 2016). In the 2017 season, the triangular system returned and now features four clubs in each of the three groups and first ever featuring playoffs which they kept, the playoffs begins after the end of the group stage. Also, the previous season's champion qualified and Mindelense placed in Group A. Mindelense did not advance into the finals, Sporting Praia would win their 10th and recent national championship title after defeating FC Ultramarina Tarrafal.

Sporting Praia and CS Mindelense each won four consecutive titles, the first Sporting Praia between 2006 and 2009 and Mindelense between 2013 and 2016. The clubs who had their best seasons after 2000 were Mindelense and Derby a few times, their recent was in 2015 and SC Atlético.

CS Mindelense holds the most number of national titles won numbering twelve.

Over 40 clubs have participated at the national championships, of which Mindelense held the most, the least being one appearance, about 20 clubs appeared once in the nationals.

A few cancellations and interruptions occurred in the championships, one in 2008 between Sporting Praia, Académica do Fogo and later Sal Rei, Sporting Praia was awarded 3–0 as Académica do Fogo fielded an ineligible player, the award to Sal Rei was revoked. It canceled the playoff stage for about a month. In 2017, another interruption occurred, the first leg of the match was delayed as access to Estádio Orlando Rodrigues was locked as the players had no extra keys, in mid-July, Ultramarina appealed the reason as they were about to be awarded 3–0 against, later the first leg match were to be played in late July. Mindelense did not show up for a few weeks and after that club failing to appear to play in the first leg, Mindelense was disqualified and its matches were annulled and Ultramarina Tarrafal headed to their second and recent championship final appearance. The second leg match between Mindelense and Ultramarina in Mindelo was played.

== Continental level ==
The winner of the national championship takes part in the CAF Champions League the following season, the second place club takes part in the CAF Confederation Cup, the first was in 1992, five years after the association became part of the Confederation of African Football (CAF) and their recent was Sporting Clube da Praia in 2009. Six clubs took part including Sporting Praia, Mindelense, FC Derby, Académica do Sal, Boavista Praia and Travadores competed, only one club SC Atlético was disqualified due to that the football federation did not name the entrant on time.

As Cape Verde are part of the whole of West Africa, it was the only nation that not a single club took part in the WAFU Club Championship.

== Island/Regional competitions ==
After independence, other islands started to have their island championships, Fogo and Sal were the next who first held it in 1976, Boa Vista in 1978, Brava in 1985. Later São Nicolau held its first championship and later Maio in 1990, Santo Antão was the last one which started in 1995.

In around 1995, Santiago's South zone became the first zone ever to feature a first and second divisions, followed by Fogo and Santiago North in about 2002, São Vicente in 2008, Northern Santo Antão in 2013, Sal in 2014 and Maio, the most recent in 2015. Northern Santiago league is the only league to have the first and final phase competitions, the north and northcentral groups existed in the early years and in around 2010, the group system were eliminated and up to 2015, all 13 clubs competed in the first phase and the top four elevates to the second phase and the winner was decided on the highest number of points and goals. Garridos is the only club to change regional divisions from Northern to Southern Santiago in 2011 as its location is in the south of the island. In the early 2010s, instead of two clubs directly relegating, the promotional/unelevated matches were introduced and a two-match system are featured in the regional championships of Fogo, Santiago North and South (not in 2016) Zones and São Vicente, the club with the most points either stays or be promoted, the club with the least either be promoted or not be promoted in the following season.

The most number of clubs of any island/regional league is Southern Santiago, the fewest is Brava, Maio once held it until 2015.

In the early 2010s, Cape Verde would contain around a hundred football clubs in 11 regional competitions, some of them with two divisions. In 2014, six new football clubs were added to the Sal Island League and the second division was formed., a year later in 2015, nearly all of the clubs (one of them was suspended) returned to the competition in the Santiago North Zone, some new clubs were added and the two division system were established, the regional league featured a 26 match season and saw some records in goals, wins and points got by some clubs, the 2015-16 Santiago North Zone season was the longest regional season of any of the regional leagues in the country, Varandinha was the 2015/16 winner with a record number of points, the South Zone of Santiago was the second longest and the third longest being Fogo. Until 2015, Maio had the shortest regional season of any of the regional leagues in the country, Brava has the shortest since that time. The length of the season of the Santiago North Zone is now the same as the Santiago South Zone. Some of the second division matches takes places in May and up to June especially Santiago North.

Both the Santiago North and South Zones has the most number of clubs numbering 22 since 2016, each has 12 in the Premier Division and 10 in the Second. Fogo is third, São Vicente is fourth with 14, 8 in the Premier and 6 in the Second. Brava has the least numbering 7. Boa Vista, Brava, the Santo Antão South Zone and São Nicolau are the remaining championships with only a single division.

From 1922 to 1933, São Vicente had the most number of clubs, Santiago island took it up to the break up in 2003, up to the late 2013, the South Zone had the most number of clubs, the North Zone had the most in the 2015–16 season numbering 22, 14 in the Premier and 8 in the Second.

There were several cancellations and interruptions of a regional competition, the first was Brava from 1986 to 1993, Boa Vista had cancelled some editions before 1992, São Vicente in 1990, Santiago did not held its competitions in 1999 and 2001. Due to money problems, Maio and Brava did not held it in 2000. The South Zone of Santo Antão did not held it in 2004, the North Zone of Santiago did not held it in 2006 and lastly Brava did not held it in 2011. In one portion, the 2011 Santo Antão South Cup were not held along with the 2009, 2011, 2012 and the 2014 editions of the Santo Antão Super Cup were not held, the latter due to Sanjoanense's and Fiorentina's withdrawal and the São Vicente ones of 2008 and 2011. Also other opening tournaments/association cups were cancelled were the 2013 São Nicolau one and the ones of São Vicente in 2010, 2014 and 2015. Several competitions were interrupted, the editions of the Fogo Regional Championships were delayed due to the Pico do Fogo eruptions of 1995 and December 2014, the latter cancelled the 2014-15 Fogo Cup, it probably cancelled the 2013-14 Santiago South Zone Cup on the adjacent island. Its recent interruption was the 2017 Santiago North Zone championships (Premier and Second) for the second and third weeks of February which were suspended due to that the referees needed the salaries for the 17th and the 26th rounds last season and the rounds of the season, the regional competition resumed on February 25 as the referees were paid four days earlier by its sponsorship of two telecommunications companies, one of them was Cabo Verde Telecom and the municipalities where the clubs are based.

Several seasons had a club or two fielded ineligible players for a part or all of the season, such as FC Ultramarina and SC Atlético in the 2005 São Nicolau season and somewhere around 2009 and recently Académica do Mindelo of São Vicente's Premier Division for five matches with a fake goalkeeper for the 2016–17 season, they included matches with Salamansa, Derby, Farense Fonte Filipe, the almighty Mindelense and Ribeira Bote, they lost 11 points on April 24 and their positions dropped from first to fifth, the club finished third for the season. For some seasons, there were championship disputes in one of the region, São Nicolau in 2005 and one season, and Santiago North Premier Division, first between Scorpion Vermelho and Varandinha in 2016 where Scorpion thought they fielded an ineligible player in a late season match that ended in a two-goal draw with Desportivo de Santa Cruz, the award was revoked as Scorpion Vermelho did not and Varandinha became champions for the season, it delayed a single match, the Desportivo-Varandinha match which was rescheduled to 4 June. A season later in 2017, another one between AJAC da Calheta and Benfica Santa Cruz occurred as Benfica Santa Cruz thought that AJAC fielded a suspended player in a match with Juventus Assomada where they defeated that club 2–4. It went into a dispute especially from May 11 to 17, as chairman Amarildo Semedo and other clubs did not like that. The award to Juventus was revoked once more as AJAC did not fielded a suspended played and after taking it to a sports court, the national football federation decided that AJAC became regional champions on May 17. This has not delayed two matches, the match with Fogo's Vulcânicos and São Nicolau's Ultramarina Tarrafal.

== Regional records ==
Other records includes best season which Académica Porto Novo had achieved in 2012 that were all wins. The longest unbeaten streak of any of the island leagues was Académica Porto Novo which lasted around 50 to 60 matches without a loss that lasted between 2012 and April 23, 2016, the record also ended on away matches which the club lost to CS Marítimo 2–1, the record continues on home matches. Académica also has a record combined with Cup and Super Cup matches but not the Santo Antão Cup which was the first cup loss that Académica Porto Novo had/. The second is Mindelense that lasted from March 29, 2014, to April 16, 2016, with the loss to Amarante, along with home (started from January 12) and away to matches (up to April 24, 2016, with the loss to Derby). Paulense had a ten match unbeaten streak from 2014 to late 2015 and has a 15 away match unbeaten record that continues since late 2013.

== Cup, Super Cup, Opening Tournament and Champions' Trophy competitions ==
The opening tournaments as well as its insular cup and super cup competition were added in 1985 in the island of Santiago, later in 1999 in most of the nine islands, Boa Vista created theirs in 2009, Brava and Maio were the last one in which the cup and super cup competition were created in 2011 The Super Cup competitions features a regional champion and a regional cup winner. In some seasons when a club wins a championship and a cup title, the second place cup title participates. Santiago North Zone does not have these competitions, not even the opening tournament The Opening Tournament (equivalent to a League Cup) only features one portion where a club competes once with a different club of the two divisions, in São Vicente (including the adjacent islands), it is known as the Association Cup and features two divisions with one portion where a club competes once with a different club, these take place at the start of the season a month (or two) before the regional championships begin. The one on Boa Vista island created before the cup and super cup competitions were created in around 2007.

There were cancellations of regional cup competitions, its recent was Brava in 2016. The longest is Santiago North who hasn't held is since 2008.

The Championship Trophy was first implemented in 2016 which features the champion of the regional Premier and Second Divisions in several regional championships. The first one was the São Vicente Champions' Cup held on October 15 which featured Mindelense and Ribeira Bote, Mindelense won their first and only title. Maio and Fogo also held their first editions in November where Real Marítimo (Second Division) and Vulcânicos (Premier Division) won. There are three in Cape Verde, there is a possibility of additional ones in other regional competitions for this season.

National cup competitions includes the main Cape Verdean Cup which began in 2007 and was held for four seasons, the 2008 and 2011 competition were cancelled and since 2013 and the Cape Verdean Independence Cup. The Cape Verdean Super Cup was held in 2013 between a championship and a cup winner, Sporting Praia faced Onze Unidos and Sporting Praia claimed their only title, the 2014 edition was challenged with the country's second greatest team Sporting Praia. Boavista Praia holds the most number of national cup titles numbering two.

== Local competitions ==
The island also has several municipal competitions, on Fogo, there is the São Filipe Municipal Tournament (then as the Municipal Day Tournament), on Santo Antão there is the Paul and Ribeira Grande Municipal Cup, both in the North Zone and newly created in 2016, the GAFT Cup where Varandinha won their only title. Area or communal tournaments is the Mindelo Cup.

== Friendly competitions ==
In 2014, Boavista FC held its friendly competition, the Boavista Champions' Cup. Boavista won their first title in 2014, the second edition featured some clubs from outside Cape Verde. The 2016 edition featured four clubs, the other were Sporting, Mindelense and Académica do Fogo, Boavista won their recent title. Also in Praia, it held another one titled the Tournament of Académicas of Cape Verde.

== Other competitions ==
In 2016–17, the Armed Forces Cup took place in the island of Sal, its first winner was SC Santa Maria.

== See also ==
- Timeline of Cape Verdean football
