= Desportivo Estância Baixo =

Football club in Cape Verde

- Full name: Clube Desportivo da Estância de Baixo
- Ground: Estância de Baixo on Boa Vista Island, Cape Verde
- League: Boa Vista Island League
- 2015–16: 7th

Desportivo Estância Baixo (Capeverdean Crioulo, ALUPEC or ALUPEK: Disportivu Estânsia Baixu and the São Vicente Crioulo: Desportivo (ou D'sportiv') Estância Baixo) is a sports club for an association football team that plays in the Boa Vista Island League in Cape Verde. The team is based in the settlement of Estância de Baixo in the island of Boa Vista and receives assistance from the local government. The club area includes the south of the island, especially Curral Velho. The team has never won any title.

Apart from football, the club also has an athletics department.

Its logo has a thin shield with aqua rims on top and reads "CDEB", with the yellow star on top left, the football (soccer ball) on top right and white-aqua stripes on bottom featuring the sea turtle, common in the northern part.

== History ==
Second place would finish for the season and was the best appearance at the regionals. As Sal Rei were 2004 national champions, the club qualified as runner up.

The team's first and only appearance to the federal division was in the 2005 season and was ranked fifth with three points in Group B. In that season, the club suffered the worst defeat in the Cape Verdean National Championships who lost to Sporting Clube da Praia with 13 goals and amounted half of all the 26 goals the club conceded, the second worst was five goals to FC Derby.

In recent years, their positions was not as well but moderate, they were 6th in 2008, 8th place they finished in 2014 and 2015, first with two wins, three draws and 11 goals scored, then worst, four draws and 10 losses, 10 goals were scored and 52 goals were conceded which was the season's highest, worst after Juventude do Norte. Estância Baixo made a 24 match winless streak In 2016, Estância Baixo did slightly better. The first round match on January 17 was a 1–0 win over Sanjoanenses and it was the club's recent win. They attempted to finished sixth or fifth but failed after two losses came at the final two rounds, first to Sporting Boa Vista and the club was placed seventh for the remainder of the season, then the mighty Sal Rei. Estância Baixo suffered during the 2016–17 season as they had no win, they had 3 draws and had 11 losses, they scored 8 goals, they conceded 39 goals, the worst on the island, worse than Africa Show, their worst was a 0–7 loss to Onze Estrelas on April 1. Their positions were moderate, started 6th, then 7th in the third round and then 8th for the remainder of the season and would finish with only 3 points. Estância Baixo also has a 27 match winless streak.

Estância Baixo started the 2017–18 with a loss to Sporting with the result 4–2. In the last 10 matches, they suffered a losing streak, they did win a single match and recently lost 0–7 to Sal Rei which was their worst for the season. The club is still last place, as the club was last up to the 13th round, there will be no chances of finishing as high as 7th place. At round 11, after their 11th loss which was to Sanjoanense, their season's final position has been marked, last place. They currently has nothing in wins, 10 goals scored and 48 goals conceded, the worst in Boa Vista. Their last goal was scored in a match with Onze Estrelas on March 18 which they lost. Overall, the club now has a 41 match winless streak at the championships which became their worst.

== Stadium ==
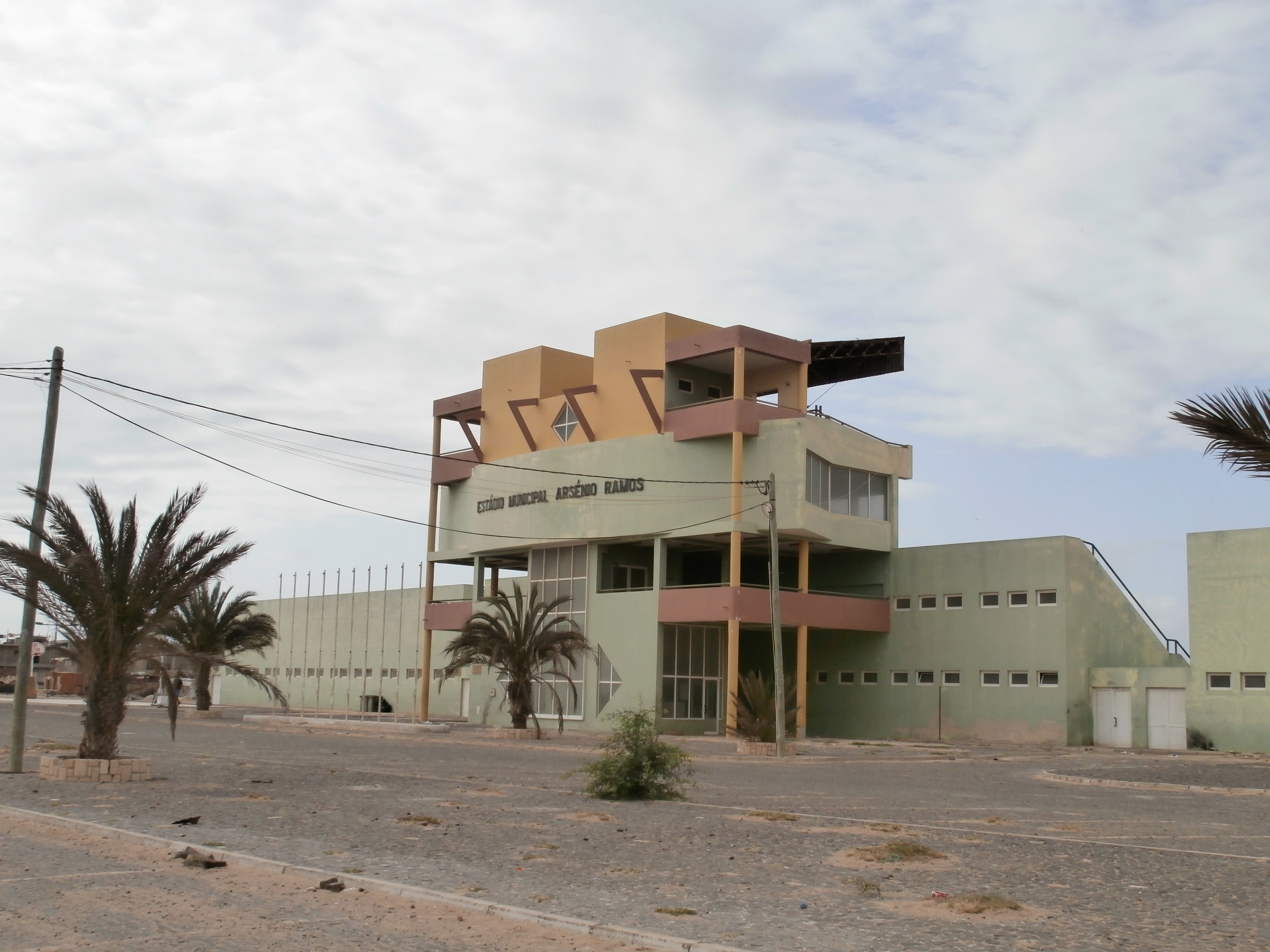
Estádio Arsénio Ramos, where Estância Baixo plays its matches

Estância Baixo has no field of its own; its training practices are done in nearby Rabil, and the club practices there. Its matches are played at Estádio Municipal Arsénio Ramos which is a multi-use stadium in Sal Rei, Cape Verde. It is currently used mostly for football matches. The stadium holds 500. The stadium is home to the island's best football clubs including Académica Operária and Sporting Boa Vista. It is also the home of Sanjoanense. Clubs from other parts of the island play at the stadium.

== League and cup history ==
=== National championship ===
Season	Div.	Pos.	Pl.	W	D	L	GS	GA	GD	P	Notes	Playoffs
2005	1B	5	5	1	0	4	7	26	-19	3	Did not advance	Did not participate

=== Island/Regional Championship ===
Season	Div.	Pos.	Pl.	W	D	L	GS	GA	GD	P	Cup	Tour	Notes
2004–05	2	2	12	-	-	-	-	-	-	-			Promoted into the National Championships
2007–08	2	6	12	-	-	-	-	-	-	-			
2013–14	2	8	14	2	3	9	11	29	-18	9			
2014–15	2	8	14	0	4	10	10	52	-42	4			
2015–16	2	7	14	1	5	8	11	24	-13	8		6th place	
2016–17	2	8	14	0	3	11	8	39	-31	3			
2017–18	2	8	14	0	0	14	10	53	-43	0	Semi-finalist		

== Statistics ==
- Best position: 5th (national – Group B)
- Total points: 3 (national)
- Total goals scored: 7 (national)
- Lowest number of points in a season: 0
- Highest number of matches lost in a season: 14 (regional), in 2018
- Most goals conceded in a season: 26 (in 2005)
- Longest winless streak: 41 (since 17 January 2016)
  - Longest winless streak away: 23 matches (since 26 January 2014)
- Worst position: 8th (regional)
- Worst season: 2018 (14 losses, 53 goals conceded)
- Worst defeat in the National Championships: Sporting Clube da Praia 13–0 Estância Baixo, June 11, 2005
