= 2000 Cape Verdean Football Championships =

Cape Verdean Football Championship
- Season: 2000
- Champions: FC Derby
- Matches played: 10
- Goals scored: 19 (1.9 per match)
- Biggest home win: Académica Operária
- Biggest away win: several clubs

The 2000 Cape Verdean Football Championship season was the 21st of the competition of the first-tier football in Cape Verde. The competition started on 13 August and finished on 10 September, it started and finished later due to the 2000 Amílcar Cabral Cup that took place at Estádio da Várzea from May 4 to 14. The tournament was organized by the Cape Verdean Football Federation. FC Derby won their second title and later participated in the 2001 CAF Champions League the following year. Sporting Clube da Praia would be the only time that a non-participant would participate in the 2000 CAF Winners Cup, the criteria for qualification was not continued.

== Overview ==
The league was contested by 7 teams with FC Derby winning the championship.

GD Amarantes was the defending team of the title but was no participant in the competition. A total of 7 clubs (4 in Group A, 3 in Group B) participated in the competition, one from each island league, no club came from the islands of Brava and Maio as the competition was cancelled for the season. The season had a shorter 2-3 matches in Group A and 2 matches in Group B. There were only 10 matches, the total number of goals scored was only a low 19.

It was the last season they used the group system with the final matches, they would use the common ranking system with the club with the most points winning the title the following season. Not until the 2003 season they would use the group system with 4 matches and with playoffs though the semis would be added.

It marked the final appearance of GD Palmeira of Santa Maria at the national championship competition, their next national appearance for that club was the 2012 Cape Verdean Cup.

== Participants ==

Participating football (soccer) clubs of the 2000 Cape Verdean Football Championships (Cape Verde)
- Académica Operária, winner of the Boa Vista Island League
- Vulcânicos FC, winner of the Fogo Island League
- GD Palmeira, winner of the Sal Island League
- CD Travadores, winner of the Santiago Island League.
- Solpontense Futebol Clube, winner of the Santo Antão Island League
- SC Atlético, winner of the São Nicolau Island League
- FC Derby, winner of the São Vicente Island League

=== Information about the clubs ===
Club	Location
Académica Operária	Sal Rei
SC Atlético	Ribeira Brava
FC Derby	Mindelo
GD Palmeira	Santa Maria
Solpontense Futebol Clube	Ponta do Sol
CD Travadores	Praia
Vulcânicos	São Filipe

== League standings ==
=== Group A ===
Pos	Team	Pld	W	D	L	GF	GA	GD	Pts
1	Académica Operária	3	1	2	0	6	3	+3	5
2	SC Atlético	3	1	2	0	5	4	+1	5
3	Solpontense	2	0	1	1	2	3	-1	1
4	CD Travadores	2	0	1	1	1	4	-3	1

Club	Ope	Atl	Sol	Tra
Académica Operária		2-2	1-1	3-0
SC Atlético			2-1	1-1
Solpontense Futebol Clube				4-0
CD Travadores				

=== Group B ===
Pos	Team	Pld	W	D	L	GF	GA	GD	Pts
1	Futebol Clube Derby	2	1	1	0	1	0	+1	4
2	Vulcânicos	2	1	0	1	1	1	0	3
3	Grupo Desportivo Palmeira	2	0	1	1	0	1	-1	1

Club	Der	Vul	Pal
FC Derby		1-0	0-0
Vulcânicos			1-0
GD Palmeira			

== Results ==
Week 1
Home	Score	Visitor	Date
Solpontense FC	1 - 1	Académica Operária	13 August
CD Travadores	1 - 1	SC Atlético	13 August
Vulcânicos FC	0 - 1	FC Derby	13 August
Week 2
Home	Score	Visitor	Date
SC Atlético	2 - 1	Solpontense FC	20 August
Académica Operária	3 - 0	CD Travadores	20 August
GD Palmeira	0 - 1	Vulcânicos FC	20 August
Week 3
Home	Score	Visitor	Date
CD Travadores	-	Solpontense FC	27 August (Note: No match took place)
SC Atlético	2 - 2	Académica Operária	27 August
FC Derby	0 - 0	GD Palmeira	27 August

== Positions by round ==
=== Group A ===
Team/Round	01	02	03
Académica Operária	1	1	1
SC Atlético	1	2	2
Solpontense	1	3	3
CD Travadores	1	4	4

=== Group B ===
Team/Round	01	02	03
FC Derby	1	1	1
GD Palmeira	3'	3	3
Vulcânicos	2	2	2

== Finals ==
3 September 2000

FC Derby	1:1	Académica Operária
Colega 45'		Eli 31'

Estádio Municipal Adérito Sena
Mindelo on São Vicente Island
10 September 2000

Académica Operária	0:1	FC Derby
		Ica 70'

Sal Rei on Boa Vista Island

Cape Verdean Football 2000
Champions
FC Derby
2nd title

== Statistics ==
- Highest scoring match: Académica Operária 3 - 0 CD Travadores (20 August)
