= 2005 Cape Verdean Football Championships =

Cape Verdean Football Championships
- Season: 2005
- Champions: FC Derby
- Runner up: Sporting Clube da Praia
- Matches played: 35
- Goals scored: 146 (4.17 per match)
- Top goalscorer: Zé di Tchétcha (14)
- Biggest home win: Sporting Praia
- Biggest away win: FC Derby
- Highest scoring: Sporting Praia

The 2005 Cape Verdan Football Championship season was the 26th of the competition of the first-tier football in Cape Verde. Its started on 14 May and finished on 16 July, earlier than the last season. The tournament was organized by the Cape Verdan Football Federation. FC Derby won the 3rd title and did not receive entry to the 2006 CAF Champions League. No second place club would also receive entry to the 2006 CAF Confederation Cup

== Overview ==
Sporting Clube da Praia was the defending team of the title. A total of 12 clubs participated in the competition, one from each island league and one who won the last season's title. The season would be the first to have 12 titles for Sporting Praia.

Also it was the only time that a participant from Boa Vista (Desportivo Estância Baixo) came from the Rabil area and Estância de Baixo and the first time that a participant from the north of Santiago was from the municipality of Calheta de São Miguel and was Flor Jovem.

The season would break national records even in scoring, the annual goal totals was 146, Derby scored a record 10-1 against Académica from Porto Novo, later Sporting Praia first scored 6 against Morabeza two weeks later scored a record 13 against Estância Baixo, they would score 6 again in the semis and removing Sal Rei from the finals. Other high scoring matches were Académica from Fogo scored 6 against Morabeza and Derby scored 7 points against Morabeza. Sporting Praia had a record of 35 goals scored (24 in the regular season) and remains unbeaten as of 2016, while Derby scored a record 32 goals (23 in the regular season) . Also in the competition record was the scorer Zé di Tchétcha of Sporting Praia who scored 14 goals and remains unbeaten as of 2015. The Flor Jovem-Paulense match was cancelled and neither two would advance into the playoffs.

Two clubs from Santo Antão who played in the same group had their first meeting since the break-up into the two zones.

== Participating clubs ==

Participating football (soccer) clubs of the 2005 Cape Verdean Football Championships (Cape Verde)
- SC Sal Rei, winner of the 2004 Cape Verdean Football Championships
- Desportivo Estância Baixo, runner-up of the Boa Vista Island League
- SC Morabeza, winner of the Brava Island League
- Associação Académica do Fogo, winner of the Fogo Island League
- Onze Unidos, winner of the Maio Island League
- Associação Académica do Sal, winner of the Sal Island League
- Flor Jovem da Calheta, winner of the Santiago Island League (North)
- Sporting Clube da Praia, winner of the Santiago Island League (South)
- Paulense Desportivo Clube, winner of the Santo Antão Island League (North)
- Associação Académica do Porto Novo, winner of the Santo Antão Island League (South)
- Desportivo Ribeira Brava, winner of the São Nicolau Island League
- FC Derby, winner of the São Vicente Island League

=== Information about the clubs ===
Club	Location
Associação Académica do Fogo	São Filipe
Associação Académica do Porto Novo	Porto Novo
Académica do Sal	Espargos
FC Derby	Mindelo
Desportivo Estância Baixo	Estancia de Baixo
Flor Jovem	Calheta de São Miguel
SC Morabeza	Vila Nova Sintra
Onze Unidos	Vila do Maio
Paulense Desportivo Clube	Paúl
Desportivo Ribeira Brava	Ribeira Brava
SC Sal Rei	Sal Rei
Sporting Clube da Praia	Praia

== League standings ==
=== Group A ===
Pos	Team	Pld	W	D	L	GF	GA	GD	Pts
1	Associação Académica do Sal	5	4	1	0	10	4	+6	13
2	SC Sal Rei	5	3	1	1	9	6	+3	10
3	Associação Académica do Fogo	5	2	1	2	10	7	+3	10
4	Paulense Desportivo Clube	4	1	1	2	7	6	+1	4
5	Desportivo Ribeira Brava	5	0	3	2	4	9	-5	3
6	Flor Jovem	4	0	1	3	4	12	-8	1

=== Group B ===
Pos	Team	Pld	W	D	L	GF	GA	GD	Pts
1	Sporting Clube da Praia	5	4	1	0	24	2	+22	13
2	FC Derby	5	4	1	0	23	3	+20	13
3	Onze Unidos	5	3	0	2	11	7	+4	9
4	Associação Académica do Porto Novo	5	2	0	3	9	18	-9	6
5	Desportivo Estância Baixo	5	1	0	4	7	26	-19	3
6	SC Morabeza	5	0	0	5	4	22	-18	0

== Results ==
Week 1
Home	Score	Visitor	Date
Ribeira Brava	0 - 3	Paulense	14 May
Académica Fogo	0 - 1	Sal Rei	14 May
Flor Jovem	1 - 2	Académica Sal	5 June
Estância Baixo	1 - 2	Derby	14 May
Académica Porto Novo	3 - 1	Morabeza	14 May
Sporting Praia	2 - 0	Onze Unidos	5 June

Week 2
Home	Score	Visitor	Date
Paulense	2 - 2	Académica Fogo	21 May
Académica Sal	1 - 1	Ribeira Brava	21 May
Sal Rei	3 - 1	Flor Jovem	21 May
Derby	10 - 1	Académica Porto Novo	21 May
Onze Unidos	5 - 1	Estância Baixo	21 May
Morabeza	1 - 6	Sporting Praia	22 May

Week 3
Home	Score	Visitor	Date
Paulense	1 - 2	Académica Sal	28 May
Ribeira Brava	2 - 2	Sal Rei	28 May
Académica Fogo	6 - 1	Flor Jovem	28 May
Derby	3 - 0	Onze Unidos	28 May
Estância Baixo	3 - 2	Morabeza	28 May
Académica Porto Novo	0 - 2	Sporting Praia	28 May

Week 4
Home	Score	Visitor	Date
Académica Sal	3 - 0	Académica Fogo	11 June
Sal Rei	2 - 1	Paulense	11 June
Flor Jovem	1 - 1	Ribeira Brava	11 June
Onze Unidos	3- 1	Académica Porto Novo	11 June
Sporting Praia	13 - 0	Estância Baixo	11 June
Morabeza	0 - 7	Derby	12 June

Week 5
Home	Score	Visitor	Date
Académica Sal	2 - 1	Sal Rei	18 June
Académica Fogo	2 - 0	Ribeira Brava	18 June
Flor Jovem	cancelled	Paulense	19 June
Onze Unidos	3 - 0	Morabeza (Note: Morabeza did not show up, Onze Unidos was awarded 3-0)	18 June
Sporting Praia	1 - 1	Derby	18 June
Académica Porto Novo	4 - 2	Estância Baixo	18 June

== Final Stages ==
Semi-Finals				Finals
Sal-Rei FC	2	1	3
Sporting Clube da Praia	1	6	7	Sporting Clube da Praia	1	3	4
FC Derby	4	0	4	FC Derby	1	4	5
Académica (Espargos)	1	0	1

=== Semi-finals ===
25 June 2005

Sal-Rei FC	2:1	Sporting Clube da Praia
Ravs 40'; Cai 90'		João di Lélé 2'

Sal Rei
26 June 2005

FC Derby	4:1	Académica (Espargos)
Neu 12'; Amadeu 29'; Pate 78'; Bafa 81'		Bento 34'

Estadio Alcindo Nascimento
Mindelo
2 July 2005

Sporting Clube da Praia	6:1	Sal-Rei FC
Zé di Tchetcha; João di Lélé; Gerson; Di II		Ravs

Estádio da Várzea
Praia
2 July 2005

Académica (Espargos)	0:0	FC Derby

Espargos

=== Finals ===
9 July 2005

Sporting Clube da Praia	1:1	FC Derby
Di I 43'		Kely 56'

Estádio da Várzea
Praia
21 July 2005

FC Derby	4:3	Sporting Clube da Praia
Paty 15' 48'; Tubola 41'; Djica 80'		Kula (OG) 85'; Di I 87'; Zé di Tchetcha 90'

Estadio Alcindo Nascimento
Mindelo

Cape Verdean Football 2005
Champions
FC Derby
3rd title

== Statistics ==
- Top scorer: Zé di Tchecha (14 goals) (Sporting Praia)
- Biggest win: Sporting Praia 13-0 Estância Baixo (June 11)
