= 2016 Cape Verdean Football Championships =

Cape Verdean Football Championship
- Season: 2016
- Champions: CS Mindelense
- Matches played: 36
- Goals scored: 88 (2.44 per match)
- Biggest home win: Mindelense
- Biggest away win: Mindelense

The 2016 Cape Verdean Football Championship season was the 37th beginner level (likely amateur) competition of the first-tier football in Cape Verde. It started on 14 May and finished on 9 July, it started five days later than last season and finished two days earlier, the season was a week shorter than last. The championship was governed by the Cape Verdean Football Federation. The scheduling was completed on November 16 and the group system was kept instead of becoming a one portion season without playoffs and was the last time. CS Mindelense won the record breaking title and became the second club after Sporting Praia to win four in a row, the highest ever, also it was Mindelense's last. Mindelense chose to not participate in the CAF Champions League competition in 2017, Académica do Porto Novo did not participate in the 2017 CAF Confederation Cup, both of the clubs due to financial concerns, of any club, it is the eighth consecutive time and becomes the recent African nation not to bring a champion to the continentals for the most consecutive years, in the cup competition, Cape Verde is the longest for not bringing a club in Africa lasting for more than 15 years straight, not even the three national cup winners competed. Mindelense qualified and participated in the 2017 National Championships.

== Overview ==
The triangular phase started to be used for the 2017 season, it became the fourth time and first with four clubs each and with playoffs.

CS Mindelense was the defending team of the title. A total of 12 clubs participated in the competition, one from each island league and one who won the last season's title. The finals had two matches, Académica scored the first and Mindelense score the second leg, each with a goal, the second match went into extra time and again went into the penalty shootout, this was the first time that the season had the finals with two consecutive penalty shootouts, Mindelense won the shootout by four and claimed the recent national title.

Six clubs returned again, Desportivo da Praia returned in three years, Sport Sal Rei Club returned in five years and Vulcânicos returned in several years, Sinagoga of Santo Antão and Varandinha of Tarrafal de Santiago, two clubs competed for the first time. Varandinha's appearance was the first from the Santiago North Zone into the semifinals. At the finals, it was the sixth time that the two clubs were from Barlavento known as the Battle of Barlavento.

The biggest win was Mindelense, who scored 5-2 over Sal Rei from Boa Vista, the rest of the matches had a maximum of three goals in some of its matches as it was a low scoring season, one fifth approximately of last season, though overall are ranked third, the second highest match was Varandinha - Mindelense who Mindelense won 1-4. In Group A, neither club scored ten goals while only Mindelense from Group B scored eleven, the second club in the group scored eight and was fifth placed Sal Rei. Vulcânicos scored the fewest with two goals. Overall, Mindelense scored 16 goals, Derby and Varandinha second with ten goals and Académica Porto Novo and Sal Rei fourth with eight goals.

One match, Desportivo Praia and Varandinha originally for mid-May, on May 13, it was rescheduled to June 1, the main reason that on an April 3 match (19th round) featuring Desportivo Santa Cruz and Scorpion Vermelho that Desportivo fielded an ineligible player, it occurred after the goals were scored and the award to Scorpion Vermelho in mid-May was revoked and the 2-0 result was kept along with Varandinha first championship title. The next such delay was in 2017.

== Participating clubs ==

Participating football (soccer) clubs of the 2016 Cape Verdean Football Championships (Cape Verde)
- CS Mindelense, winner of the 2015 Cape Verdean Football Championships
- Sport Sal Rei Club, winner of the Boa Vista Island League
- Sporting Clube da Brava, winner of the Brava Island League
- Vulcânicos, winner of the Fogo Island League
- Académico 83, winner of the Maio Island League
- Académico do Aeroporto, winner of the Sal Island League
- Varandinha, winner of the Santiago Island League (North)
- Desportivo da Praia, winner of the Santiago Island League (South)
- Clube Desportivo Sinagoga, winner of the Santo Antão Island League (North)
- Académica do Porto Novo, winner of the Santo Antão Island League (South)
- SC Atlético, winner of the São Nicolau Island League
- FC Derby, runner up of the São Vicente Island League

=== Information about the clubs ===
Club	Location	Venue	Capacity
Académico 83	Vila do Maio	20 de Janeiro	4,000
Académica do Porto Novo	Porto Novo	Porto Novo	8,000
Académico do Aeroporto	Espargos	Marcelo Leitão	8,000
SC Atlético	Ribeira Brava	Orlando Rodrígues	5,000
Desportivo da Praia	Praia	Várzea	12,000
FC Derby	Mindelo	Adérito Sena	5,000
Mindelense	Mindelo	Adérito Sena	5,000
Clube Desportivo Sinagoga	Sinagoga	João Serra	2,000
Sport Sal Rei Club	Sal Rei	Arsénio Ramos	500
Sporting Clube da Brava	Nova Sintra	Aquiles d'Oliveira	500
GD Varandinha	Tarrafal	Mangue	
Vulcânicos	São Filipe	5 de Julho	1,000

Italics indicates a team playing in a stadium in a different town or city.

== League standings ==
=== Group A ===
Pos	Team	Pld	W	D	L	GF	GA	GD	Pts
1	FC Derby	5	4	1	0	8	2	+6	13
2	GD Varandinha	5	3	1	1	9	4	+5	10
3	Desportivo da Praia	5	2	1	2	7	6	+1	7
4	Sporting Clube da Brava	5	2	0	3	6	7	-1	6
5	SC Atlético	5	1	1	3	5	10	-5	4
6	CD Sinagoga	5	0	2	3	4	10	-6	2

=== Group B ===
Pos	Team	Pld	W	D	L	GF	GA	GD	Pts
1	CS Mindelense (C)	5	3	2	0	11	3	+8	11
2	Académica do Porto Novo	5	3	2	0	6	1	+5	11
3	Académico do Aeroporto	5	2	1	2	4	4	0	7
4	Académico 83	5	1	2	2	5	8	-3	5
5	Sport Sal Rei Club	5	1	1	3	8	11	-3	4
6	Vulcânicos	5	1	0	4	2	9	-7	3

== Results ==
Week 1
Home	Score	Visitor	Date
Sinagoga	2 - 3	Sporting Brava	15 May
Derby	3 - 1	SC Atletico	15 May
Desportivo Praia	1 - 3	Varadinha	1 June
Académico Aeroporto	3 - 0	Academico 83	14 May
Sal Rei	3 - 0	Vulcânicos	14 May
Mindelense	1 - 1	Académica do Porto Novo	14 May
Week 2
Home	Score	Visitor	Date
Sinagoga	0 - 0	Desportivo Praia	21 May
Varadinha	0 - 0	Derby	21 May
SC Atletico	1 - 0	Sporting Brava	21 May
Académico Aeroporto	1 - 0	Sal Rei	21 May
Vulcânicos	0 - 3	Mindelense	22 May
Académica do Porto Novo	2 - 0	Academico 83	22 May
Week 3
Home	Score	Visitor	Date
Varadinha	3 - 0	Sinagoga	28 May
Desportivo Praia	3 - 0	SC Atletico	28 May
Sporting Brava	0 - 1	Derby	29 May
Vulcânicos	2 - 0	Académico Aeroporto	28 May
Sal Rei	0 - 2	Académica do Porto Novo	28 May
Academico 83	0 - 0	Mindelense	28 May
Week 4
Home	Score	Visitor	Date
SC Atletico	2 - 2	Sinagoga	4 June
Sporting Brava	2 - 1	Varadinha	5 June
Derby	2 - 1	Desportivo Praia	5 June
Academico 83	2 - 0	Vulcânicos	4 June
Mindelense	5 - 2	Sal Rei	4 June
Académica do Porto Novo	0 - 0	Académico Aeroporto	5 June
Week 5
Home	Score	Visitor	Date
Sinagoga	0 - 2	Derby	11 June
Desportivo Praia	2 - 1	Sporting Brava	11 June
Varadinha	2 - 1	SC Atletico	11 June
Académico Aeroporto	0 - 2	Mindelense	12 June
Vulcânicos	0 - 1	Académica do Porto Novo	12 June
Sal Rei	3 - 3	Academico 83	12 June

== Final stages ==
Semi-Finals				Finals
FC Derby	0	2	2
Académica do Porto Novo	0	2	2	CS Mindelense	0	1	1
CS Mindelense	4	2	6	Académica do Porto Novo	1	0	0
GD Varandinha	1	0	1

=== Semi-finals ===
18 June 2016

Académica do Porto Novo	0:0	FC Derby

Estádio Municipal de Porto Novo
Porto Novo
18 June 2016

Varandinha	1:4	CS Mindelense
Ary		Maniche 29'; Adyr 56' 74'; Djimkely 66'

Mangue
Tarrafal
26 June 2016
15:30

FC Derby	2:2	Académica do Porto Novo
Barâo 51'; Metcha 94'		Davi 3' 32'

Estádio Municipal Adérito Sena
Mindelo
25 June 2016
15:30

CS Mindelense	2:0	Varandinha

Estádio Municipal Adérito Sena
Mindelo

=== Finals ===
2 July 2016
16:00 (CVT)

CS Mindelense	0:1	Académica do Porto Novo
		Scholot 89'

Estádio Municipal Adérito Sena
Mindelo
Referee: António Rodrigues
9 July 2016

Académica do Porto Novo	0:1	CS Mindelense
		Djinkely 38'
Penalties
	4-5

Municipal de Porto Novo
Porto Novo
Referee: Jaime Figueiredo

Cape Verdean Football 2016
Champions
CS Mindelense
12th title

== Statistics ==
- Highest scoring match: Mindelense 5-2 Sport Sal Rei Clube 4 June

== See also ==
- 2015–16 in Cape Verdean football
