= Boa Vista Island Super Cup =

- Founded: 2010
- Region: São Vicente, Cape Verde
- Current champions: Académica Operária (2nd time)
- Most championships: Sport Sal Rei Club

The Boa Vista Super Cup, also known as Bubista Cup under the Boa Vista Creole name (ALUPEK: Taça da Dja da Boa Bista or Bubista) is a regional super cup competition played during the season in Boa Vista Island, Cape Verde. The super cup competition is organized by the Boa Vista Regional Football Association (Associação Regional da Boa Vista de Futebol, ARBVF). Its current winner is Académica Operária who won their second super cup title.

The competition first took place in 2010. Until 2015, no club qualified as runner-up into the super cup and were the two in the nation (the other was São Nicolau).

Second straight time that the Boa Vista derby will appear in the upcoming 2018 super cup with Académica Operária and Sal Rei. With Sal Rei being both champions and cup winner for the season, Académica Operária will qualify as runner up in the cup final.

== Winners ==
Season	Winner	Score	Runner-up
2009/10	Sport Sal Rei Club		Sporting Boa Vista
2010/11	Unknown (Note: The super cup featured the champion Sal Rei and the cup winner Africa Show)		
2011/12	Juventude do Norte		Académica Operária
2012/13	Sport Sal Rei Club		Onze Estrelas
2013/14	Académica Operária		Onze Estrelas
2014/15	Sport Sal Rei Club^{1}	3-1	Académica Operária
2015/16	Onze Estrelas	3-0^{2}	Sport Sal Rei Club
2016/17	Académica Operária^{1}	1-0	Sport Sal Rei Club

^{1}Runner-up in the cup competition as the season's champion was also a cup winner
^{1}Onze Estrelas was awarded 0-3, originally it was 2-1 as Sal Rei fielded an ineligible player

== See also ==
- Boa Vista Island Cup
- Boa Vista Island League
- Boa Vista Opening Tournament
