= Estádio Municipal Arsénio Ramos =

Stadium in Boa Vista, Cape Verde

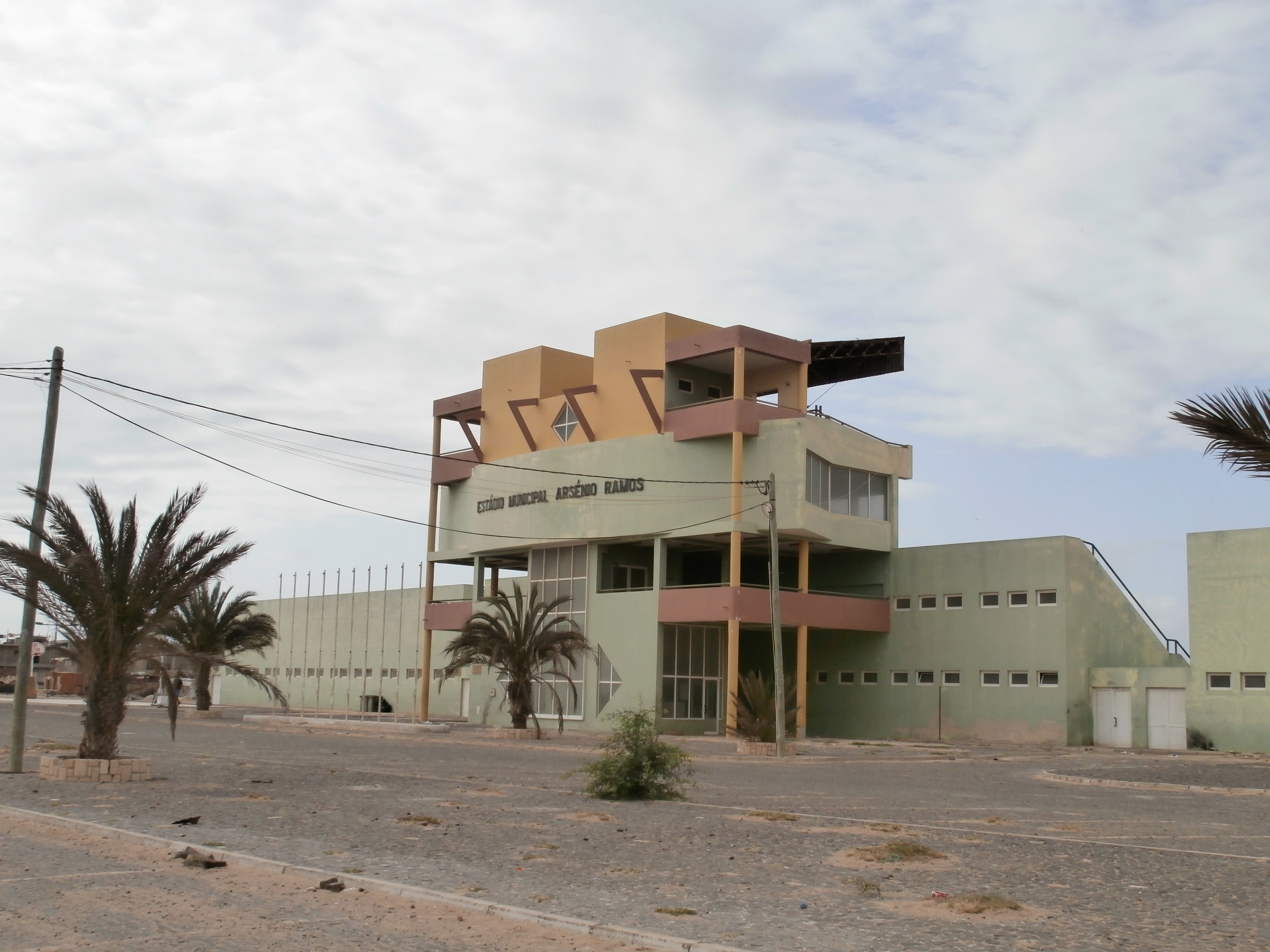

- Location within Cape Verde
- Location: Sal Rei, Boa Vista, Cape Verde
- Coordinates: 16.1792°N 22.9093°W
- Owner: Municipality of Boa Vista
- Operator: Boa Vista Regional Football Association; Boa Vista Regional Athletics Association
- Capacity: 500

Construction
- Opened: February 9, 2008
- Cost: CVE 110 million

Tenants
- Académica Operária; Sal-Rei; Sanjoanense; Sporting

Estádio Municipal Arsénio Ramos is a multi-use stadium in Boa Vista, Cape Verde used for both football and athletics. Its location is northeast of the town center south of the town perimeter road, a bypass connecting the port and places in the east and south of the island. It is at the urban limit and close to the island's industrial area located in the east and former salt mines to the west along with its beach and its newly built hotels and villas. It is currently used mostly for football matches and is the home stadium of Académica Operária, Sal-Rei, Sanjoanense and Sporting. The stadium holds 500 people. It is named for Arsénio Ramos, its size is 104 m × 66 m (341 ft × 217 ft) and its grass is artificial.

The stadium was first opened on February 9, 2008.

Before the stadium opened, the football (soccer) field was in the western end of the city next to the port and the Atlantic. A basketball court later built on the former space and recently small residential complexes has been built on the site.

The Boa Vista Regional Athletics Association has its own championships, regional competitions takes place every season.

== See also ==
- List of buildings and structures in Boa Vista, Cape Verde
- List of football stadiums in Cape Verde
