= Onze Estrelas Boa Vista =

Onze Estrelas
- Full name: Onze Estrelas Boa Vista; Onze Estrelas Clube de Bofareira
- Founded: 5 April 1976
- Ground: Estádio Arsénio Ramos, Sal Rei, Cape Verde
- Capacity: 1,000
- Chairman: Carlos Morais
- Manager: Tó Monteiro
- League: Boa Vista Island League
- 2015–16: 3rd
Home colours	Away colours

Onze Estrelas Boa Vista or Onze Estrelas Clube de Bofareira (Portuguese meaning Eleven Stars) is a football (soccer) club that currently plays in the Campeonato Nacional de Cabo Verde and in the Boa Vista Island League in Cape Verde. It is based on the island of Boa Vista and plays in the stadium with a capacity of 1,000 though the village they play is for Bofareira. Its current manager is Tó Monteiro.

== Logo ==
Its logo color is light green with a green flower in the middle and the middle, outside the eleven stars representing the main islands of Cape Verde and on the bottom reads unidos para vencer (union for winning).

== History ==
The club was founded on 5 April 1976 by a group of young people from an abandoned village named Espingueira. In July 2010, they would form an association to compete in regional matches. Their first appearance into the insular division was during the 2010–11 season and is the island's most recent appearance of any new team today, the club finished second that season, Onze Estrelas finished third. The team would win their first and only championship title for the island of Boa Vista in 2013 and elevated to the national competition for the first and only time and would be ranked fourth. A year later they would also win the island's first and only cup title, at the regional super cup, the club lost to Académica Operária. Onze Estrelas finished fourth in the 2014–15 season behind África Show. Djo Bracó who coached previous clubs including Sal Rei FC in 2004 became the manager for the 2015–16 season and the club finished for the third time being third with 24 points, behind Académica Operária. In December 2016, Tó Monteiro became manager of the club. Onze Estrelas got a success and took the number one position after a win over Estância Baixo on January 28, 2017, their position lasted until March 19, earlier a draw with Juventude slowed the success and after a loss to Sanjoanense placed the club second. Along with Académica Operária, had 21 points, Onze Estrela scored 27 goals while the other scored only ten at the 11th round. On April 1, the club defeated Estância Baixo 0–7 and made the region's highest scoring match, the club was second place with 21 points behind Sal Rei and got their final total of 27 points. The final round would be placed fourth for the fourth time and had 27 goals scored again and had 27 points, more successful than the previous three seasons, its goal totals were second behind Sal Rei and ahead of Africa Show.

The club received five awards from the Gala do Desporte de Boa Vista, including best player and the insular championship in 2014.

Onze Estrelas lost the 2016 Bubista Cup to Sal Rei. As Sal Rei were 2016 regional champions, Onze Estrelas qualified into the Super Cup runner-up in the cup. Sal Rei was tied with a goal with Onze Estrelas, later the match was 2–1 and Sal Rei brought an ineligible player to the field. As it was against the rules, the Super Cup was finished and Onze Estrelas was awarded 0–3 and won their only Super Cup title.

On December 3, 2017, Onze Estrelas got another achievement and is their only association cup title, the club finished first with 15 points and did not lost a single match, it was a point ahead of runner up Sal Rei.

Onze Estrelas started with an 0–1 win over last year's champion Sal Rei and contested a chance to win a championship title for Onze Estrelas. Since the start of 2018, the club had a four match winning streak and had 16 points, they were second as they scored nine goals, overall fourth ranked behind Sal Rei, Sporting and Académica Operária. That streak ended when they faced Sal Rei which ended in a loss and lost its polarity of trying to gain first place. Their situation got worst as they lose to Africa Show and became third, then a huge 1–6 loss to Académica Operária and was fourth and a smaller loss to Sanjoanense, they were sixth with 16 points, 5 wins and a draw sharing with Sporting, Onze Estrelas has 14 goals scored, 7 less than Sporting. Onze Estrelas made a 2–0 win over Juventude on March 11 and remains six with 19 points, also shared with Sporting and Onze Estrelas. With only six points fewer than first placed Sal Rei's, along Sporting and Sanjoanense, they had one last chance for a regional title, for Onze Estrelas, another one. Onze Estrelas defeated Estântia Baixo on March with the score 1–4 and shares its points with Sporting. Wins made by Sal Rei and Académica Operária made Onze Unidos completely lost a chance for another championship title.

Since their first participation, their lowest position in the championships is third place in which they got it four times.

== Stadium ==
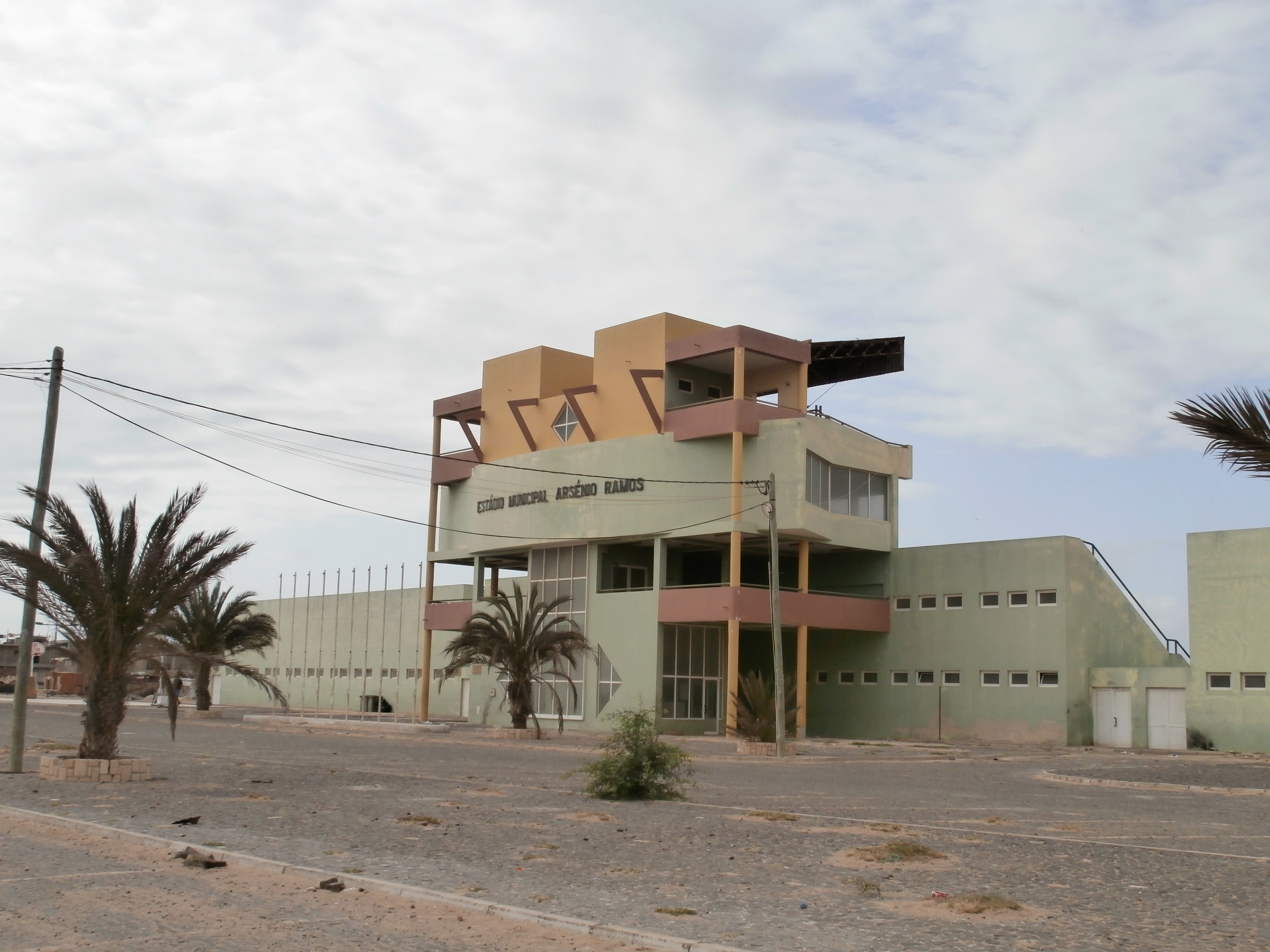
Estádio Arsénio Ramos, home of Sport Sal Rei Club

The team plays at the stadium named Arsénio Ramos which it was completed on 9 February 2008 and first played in the 2010–11 season.

== Honours ==
- Boa Vista Island League: 1

2012/13

- Boa Vista (Bubista) Cup: 1

2013/14

- Boa Vista (Bubista) Super Cup: 1

2015/16

- Boa Vista Island Opening Tournament: 1

2017

== League and cup history ==
=== National championship ===
Season	Div.	Pos.	Pl.	W	D	L	GS	GA	GD	P	Notes	Playoffs
2013	1A	5	5	0	2	3	4	9	-5	2	Did not advance	Did not participate
Total:			5	0	2	3	4	9	-5	2		

=== Island/Regional Championship ===
Season	Div.	Pos.	Pl.	W	D	L	GS	GA	GA	P	Cup	Tour	Notes
2010–11	2	2	14	-	-	-	-	-	-	-			Promoted into the National Championships
2011–12	2	3	14	-	-	-	-	-	-	-			Promoted into the National Championships
2012–13	2	1	14	-	-	-	-	-	-	-			Promoted into the National Championships
2013–14	2	3	14	8	1	5	22	13	+9	25	Winner		
2014–15	2	3	14	6	5	3	26	14	+12	23			
2015–16	2	3	14	7	3	4	27	14	+13	24	Finalist	2nd place	
2016–17	2	3	14	8	3	3	27	11	+16	27			
2017–18	2	4	14	8	1	5	23	22	+1	25	Semi-finalist		

== Statistics ==
- Best position: 5th (Group A) – national
- Best position at a cup competition: 1st (regional)
- Best position at an Association Cup: 1st
- Appearances at the regional cup competitions: 7
- Appearances at a Super Cup competition: 3
- Appearances at the Regional Championships: 7
- Appearance at the National Championships: Once
- Total goals scored: 4 (national)
- Total points: 2 (national)
- Total matches played (championship part): 103, to be 117 (regional and national)
  - Regional Championships: 98, to be 112
  - National Championships: 5
- Total matches played together with the Super Cup: 106

== Managerial history ==
Name	Nationality	From	To
Osvaldinho Rocha	Cape Verde		October 2015
Djo Bracó	Cape Verde	October 29, 2015	November 2016
Tó Monteiro	Cape Verde	since December 2016	
