= Santo Antão North Super Cup =

- Region: Northern Santo Antão, Cape Verde
- Current champions: Rosariense Clube (1st time)
- Most championships: Paulense

The Santo Antão North Super Cup . (Portuguese: Super Taça de Santo Antão Norte, ALUPEK: Super Taça di Santu Anton du Norti) is a regional super cup competition played during the season in the north of Santo Antão Island, Cape Verde consisting of the municipalities of Paul and Ribeira Grande. Sometimes known as the Ribeira Grande Super Cup, that name is no longer commonly used today. The super cup competition is organized by the Santo Antão North Regional Football Association (Associação Regional de Futebol de Santo Antão Norte, ARFSAN). Since 2015, the winner has competed in the Santo Antão Super Cup right after. Its current winner is Rosariense Clube who won their only super cup title.

== Winners ==
Season	Winner	Score	Runner-up
2011/12	Paulense		
2012/13	Paulense		
2013/14	Paulense		CD Sinagoga
2014/15	Paulense^{1}		Rosariense
2015/16	CD Sinagoga		Paulense
2016/17	Rosariense Clube	3–0	Paulense

^{1}Runner-up in the cup competition as the season's champion was also a cup winner

== See also ==
- Santo Antão Super Cup
- Sports in Santo Antão, Cape Verde
- Santo Antão North Cup
- Santo Antão North Premier Division
- Santo Antão North Opening Tournament
