= Académica Operária =

Associação Académica e Operária da Boavista
- Full name: Associação Académica e Operária da Boa Vista
- Nicknames: Preto e Branco; Os Sal Reis
- Founded: July 3, 1977
- Ground: Estádio Municipal Arsénio Ramos; Sal-Rei, Cape Verde
- Capacity: 8,000
- Chairman: Paulo Santos
- Manager: Valentim Gomes
- League: Campionato Regional da Boavista
- 2016–17: 2nd
Home colours	Away colours

Associação Académica e Operária da Boa Vista (first part, Portuguese meaning: "academy", Capeverdean Crioulo: Asosiason Akadémika y Operária/Uperária) is a sports club that its football (soccer) team had played in the Premier division and plays in the Boa Vista Island South Zone Division in Cape Verde. It is based in the island capital of Sal Rei in the island of Boa Vista and plays with Boa Vista's teams in the same stadium. Apart from football (soccer) there are also in the club basketball, volleyball and athletics departments.

Académica Operária is one of the most successful football (soccer) club in Cape Verde and is Boa Vista's most successful club, having won about 26 official titles, only one is national and the remaining 25 are regional titles.

== History ==
The club was founded on July 3, 1977. The first name of the club Académica is named after the Portuguese football club from Coimbra, the second is Portuguese for Operators. It is one of Académica clubs founded after independence. The left part reads OBV. Académico Sal Rei merged with Operária and became Académica e Operaria in the 1980s.

The team has one national title won in 1983. Regionally the club has nineteen titles, some of them won in a row between 1995 and 1996, 2001 to 2003 and their recent in 2015. Associação Académica e Operária also won their first opening tournament title in 2005, three more were won in 2013, 2015 and 2016.

The club celebrated its 10th anniversary in 1987 and later its 25th anniversary of its foundation in 2002.

The club have one of the most number of island titles of any island league in the nation numbering nineteen, their total was less than Botafogo from Fogo, in 2000, the total number of 14 island titles was tied with that club and later 15 from 2003, they did not tied with 16 until 2009 and not with 17 until 2012, the number of island titles won succeeded Botafogo's in 2014 with 18 and now they have 19 which they won in 2015.

In the 2015 season, since the addition of three clubs from 2001, Académica Operária went to new success in 2014 with a record 34 points and 11 wins and scored 34 goals, before they did, the club was six in the first two weeks and was number one for the rest of the season. The club did it again 2015, first fifth place the club started, from the second round onwards were first place and finished as recent champions and with a higher record 36 points and 13 wins.

In the 2016, season, the club took the number one spot for a week, Onze Estrelas stole it, retook it at the 7th round, Onze Estrelas got it, Académica Operária re-grabbed it again at the 9th round for three weeks until Sal Rei took it, the club was second for the last three rounds and finished it there with 9 wins, 23 goals and had 19 points, less than 2015 season. In the 2017 regional season, the club started 3rd and was in moderate position until they reached second at the final round and finished there, second straight time and had the same 9 wins, a draw more than last season, an additional point was also made numbering 30 but fewer goals were scored and was 17. Académica Operária headed up to the regional cup final and faced Sport Sal Rei Club and brought the Boa Vista Derby to the cup final. Sal Rei crowned regional champions on April 23 got Académica Operária qualification into the regional super cup later in the year. The club lost the title to Sal Rei and the club later qualified into the super cup as runner up. Also, their performance at the cup competitions as finalist became their best position. Académica Operária faced Sal Rei in the regional super cup on October 24 and won their second and recent title after they defeated Sal Rei 1–0.

Académica Operária started the 2017–18 season with a small victory (0–1) over Sanjoanense. Two draws were followed, without draws with Juventude do Norte and a goal apiece with Onze Estrelas. Académica defeated the weak Estância Baixo on January 28 with the score 5–1 and was the region's highest for only a week and was fourth with 12 points. Including that match, Académica recently made a four match winning streak and their last meeting was with Onze Estrelas where they won it 1–6 and is the second highest scoring match in Boa Vista to date behind Sal Rei's in the same 10th round. Also their positions risen to third after their match with Sanjoanense, then second place at round 9 and is their current position. In the 2017–18 Boa Vista Cup, Académica defeated Sporting 1–2 in the semis and contested their appearance at the cup final. Back to the championships, alongside Sal Rei, the club had a loss, this time to Sporting with the scored 0–1 on March 4. Still second with 21 points, now two more than Sanjoanense. Another Boa Vista Derby was played and the club won with a 2–1 victory over Sal Rei and were the six contesting for a regional title alongside Africa Show, Sporting, Sanjoanense and Onze Estrelas. Académica Operária defeated Africa Show 3–1 a week later were the two clubs left contesting a title alongside Sal Rei and a national participation. Their final match was a win over ailing Estância Baixo, a club left without wins, finished with the score of 0–5. Sal Rei's victory over Juventude, whereas Académica Operária finished with 30 points, one less and failing to win another title and with it a national division participation. At the last day of March, the cup final match featured Sal Rei, a repeat of the Boa Vista derby as did last season, what also repeated as to last season, a 2–0 loss along with the title. Académica Operária did not lost a super cup qualification due to Sal Rei being regional champions and will qualify as runner up in the cup final.

=== Playoff appearances ===
The club participated as Académico Sal Rei, they played up to the finals which took place on 2 October 1983 and defeated São Vicente's FC Derby and won their only national title. In 1995 which had not playoff, Académica Operária were the three clubs who entered the triangular phase, they included São Vicente's Académica Mindelo and Santiago's Boavista da Praia. The club faced Boavista da Praia in a single match and failed their attempt for their second title as they lost the title to that club. The team entered the playoffs in the 2000 season, they would be runner up and challenged São Vicente's Derby FC, the first leg was tied apiece with only one point, in the second leg, Académica lost its championship hope again by one point and was their last appearance at the finals.

== Stadium ==
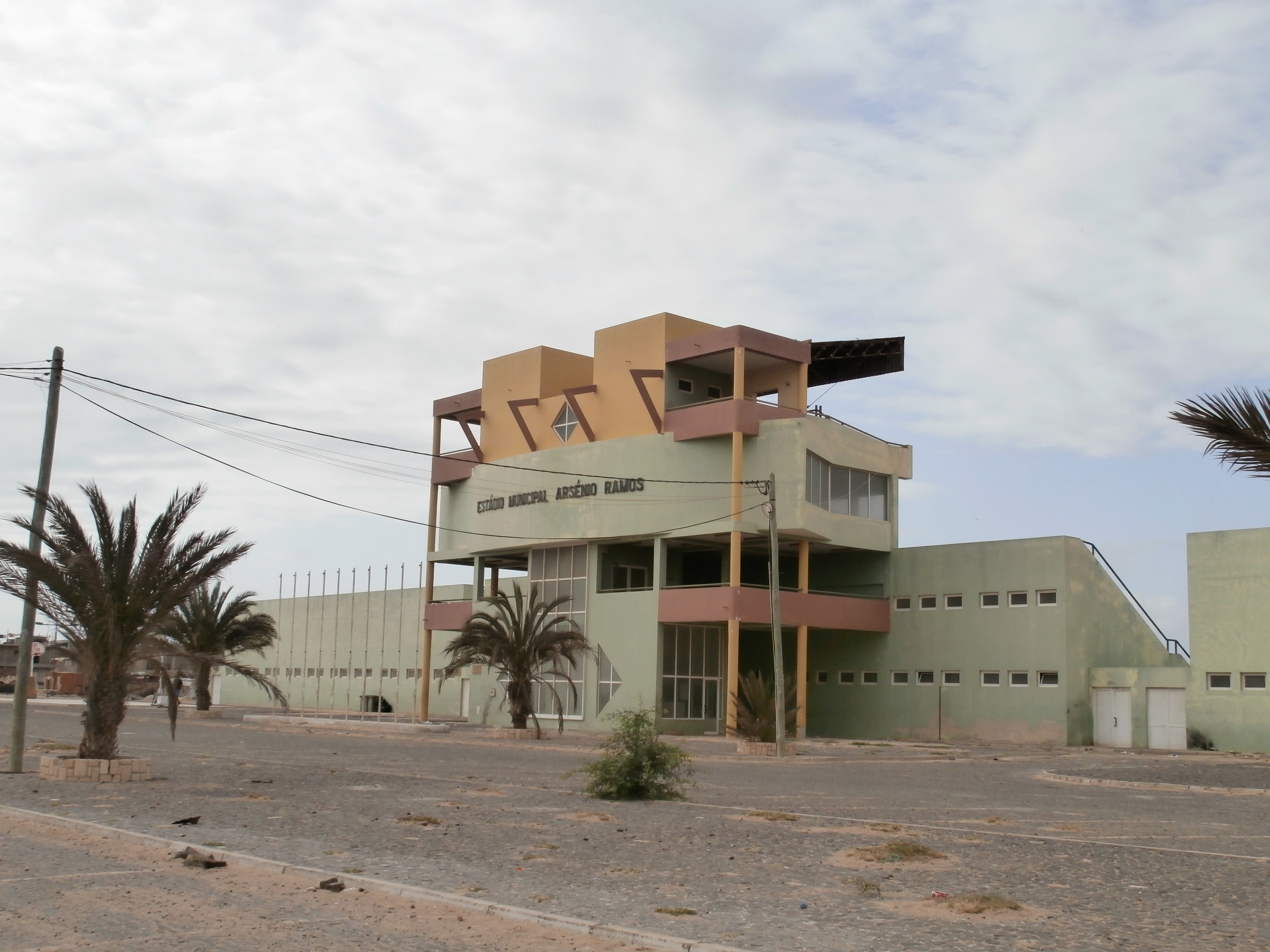
Estádio Arsénio Ramos, home of Académica Operária

Estádio Municipal Arsénio Ramos is a multi-use stadium in Sal Rei, Cape Verde. It is currently used mostly for football matches. The stadium holds 500. The stadium is home to the island's best football clubs including Sal Rei and Sporting Boa Vista. It is also the home of Sanjoanense. The club also practices at the stadium

== Rivalry ==
The club's only rivalry is Sport Sal Rei Club forming the Derby of Boa Vista Island

== Uniform ==
Today, its shirt is supplied by Adidas and is sponsored by UNICEF.

== Honours ==
- Campeonato Nacional: 1

1982/83

- Boa Vista Island League: 19

1977/78, 1978/79, 1981/82, 1982/83, 1984/85, 1988/89, 1990/91, 1992/93, 1994/95, 1995/96, 1996/97, 1998/99, 1999/2000, 2001/02, 2002/03, 2008/09, 2011/12, 2013/14, 2014/15

- Boa Vista (Bubista) Super Cup: 2

2014, 2017

- Boa Vista Opening Tournament: 4

2005, 2012–13, 2014–15, 2015–16

== League and cup history ==
=== National championship ===
Season	Div.	Pos.	Pl.	W	D	L	GS	GA	GD	P	Notes	Playoffs
1999	1B	2	3	1	2	0	5	4	+1	5	Did not advance	Did not participate
2000	1A	1	3	1	2	0	6	3	+3	5	Advanced into the finals	2nd place
2002	1	6	8	3	0	5	9	11	-2	9		
2003	1B	6	5	0	1	4	6	12	-6	1	Did not advance	Did not participate
2009	1A	6	5	0	1	4	2	9	-7	1	Did not advance	Did not participate
2012	1B	5	5	0	2	3	9	13	-7	2	Did not advance	Did not participate
2014	1B	5	5	2	0	3	3	9	-6	6	Did not advance	Did not participate
2015	1A	6	5	0	2	3	2	7	-5	2	Did not advance	Did not participate

=== Island/Regional Championship ===
Season	Div.	Pos.	Pl.	W	D	L	GS	GA	GD	P	Cup	Tour	Notes
2000–01	2	1	-	-	-	-	-	-	-	-			Promoted into the National Championships
2008–09	2	1	12	-	-	-	-	-	-	-			Promoted into the National Championships
2011–12	2	1	14	-	-	-	-	-	-	-			Promoted into the National Championships
2013–14	2	1	14	11	1	2	34	11	+23	34			Promoted into the National Championships
2014–15	2	1	14	13	1	0	33	7	+26	36			Promoted into the National Championships
2015–16	2	2	14	9	2	3	23	18	+5	29		3rd place	
2016–17	2	2	14	9	3	2	17	11	+6	30	Finalist		
2017–18	2	2	14	9	3	2	29	11	+18	30	Finalist		

== Statistics ==
- Best position: 1st (national)
- Best position at a cup competition: Finalist (regional)
- Best position at an opening tournament: 1st
- Appearances at regional cup competitions: 8, to be 9
- Appearances at a regional Super Cup: 5
- Highest number of matches played in a season: 8 (national), in 2002
- Highest number of points in a season:
  - National: 9 (national), in 2002
  - Regional: 36, in 2015
- Highest number of wins in a season: 13 (regional), in 2015
- Highest number of losses in a season: 5 (national)

== Managerial history ==
- (Cape Verde) Luis Manuel Semedo (around 2008)
