= Boa Vista Island Championships =

- Founded: around 1978
- Region: Boa Vista Island, Cape Verde
- Number of clubs: 8
- Promotion to: Cape Verdean Football Championship
- Domestic cup(s): Boa Vista Island Cup; Boa Vista Island Super Cup; Boa Vista Opening Tournament
- Current champions: Sal Rei (11th title) (2024-25)
- Most championships: Académica Operária (20 titles)
- Website: Official website

The Boa Vista Island League or Championships is a regional championship played in Boa Vista Island, Cape Verde. The winner of the championship plays in the Cape Verdean football Championships of each season. It is organized by the Boa Vista Regional Football Association (Associação Regional de Futebol da Boa Vista, abbreviation: ARFBV). Since 2010, it has the largest regional football association governing body in area in the nation.

Académica Operária won the most titles numbering nineteen, Sal Rei is second now numbering ten with their recent championship win.

During the 2004-05 season as Sal-Rei was also the national winner and received automatic qualification (the first to do so), second place Desportivo Estância Baixo qualified into the 2005 National Championships, the only time a second place club qualified from Boa Vista.

== History ==
The island league was founded around 1978.

The regional association started out with four clubs in 1978, together with Brava and Maio the fewest clubs of each championship in Cape Verde for a couple of years. It rose to five clubs in the 1990s, and later matched Sal and even later Brava with six clubs, the nation's least at the time. In 2004, it possessed one club more than neighbouring Sal to the north, but matched with Brava's club total for the fourth least. When Onze Estrelas was registered in 2010, it had eight clubs, more than Brava and another nearby island of Maio to the south, and was ranked 8th out of 11 championships by number of clubs; later it became 7th in 2011. When nearby Sal added their Second Division in 2014, its club totals became 8th out of 11th in the nation, after Maio's addition of five clubs in 2015 ranked Boa Vista's club totals of 9th out of 11th in the nation and it is the current total.

=== Title history ===
Almost every championship title won are based in Sal Rei with only one title that was won by Bofareira of the north of the island. Before 2010, every title won on the island were a club only based in Sal Rei.

== Boa Vista Island League – Clubs 2016–17 ==
- Académica (Sal Rei)
- África Show (Rabil)
- Desportivo Estância Baixo
- Juventude do Norte (Norte, Cape Verde)
- Onze Estrelas (Bofarreira)
- Sal-Rei
- Sanjoanense
- Sporting Clube da Boa Vista - Sal Rei

== Winners ==
- 1977–78: Académica Operária
- 1978–79: Académica Operária
- 1979–80: not known
- 1980–81: not known
- 1981–82: Académica Operária
- 1982–83: Académica Operária
- 1983–84: not known
- 1984–85: Sal-Rei
- 1985–86: Sal-Rei/Académica Operária?
- 1986–87: not known
- 1987–88: not known
- 1988–89: Académica Operária
- 1989–90: not known or not held
- 1990–91: Académica Operária
- 1991–92: not known or not held
- 1992–93: Académica Operária
- 1993–94: Sal-Rei
- 1994–95: Académica Operária
- 1995–96: Académica Operária
- 1996–97: Académica Operária
- 1997–98: Sal-Rei
- 1998–99: Académica Operária
- 1999–2000: Académica Operária
- 2000–01: not held
- 2001–02: Académica Operária
- 2002–03: Académica Operária
- 2003–04: Sal-Rei
- 2004–05: Sal-Rei
- 2005–06: Sal-Rei
- 2006–07: Sal-Rei
- 2007–08: Sal-Rei
- 2008–09: Académica Operária
- 2009–10: Sporting
- 2010–11: Sal-Rei
- 2011–12: Académica Operária
- 2012–13: Onze Estrelas
- 2013–14: Académica Operária
- 2014–15: Académica Operária
- 2015–16: Sal-Rei
- 2016–17: Sal-Rei
- 2017–18: Sal-Rei
- 2018–19: Onze Estrelas
- 2019–20: Sporting
- 2020–21: abandoned due to COVID-19 pandemic
- 2021–22: Académica Operária
- 2022–23: Juventude do Norte
- 2023–24: Juventude do Norte
- 2024–25: Sal-Rei

=== Performance by club ===
Club	Winners	Winning seasons
Académica Operária (Note: Until the merger with Académica Sal Rei mid 1980s, the club was known as Operária)	20	1978, 1979, 1982, 1983, 1985, 1989, 1991, 1993, 1995, 1996, 1997, 1999, 2000, 2002, 2003, 2009, 2012, 2014, 2015, 2022
Sal-Rei FC	11	1994, 1998, 2004, 2005, 2006, 2007, 2008, 2011, 2016, 2017, 2018, 2025
Juventude do Norte	2	2023, 2024
Sporting	2	2010, 2020
Onze Estrelas	2	2013, 2019

== See also ==
- Boa Vista Island Cup
- Boa Vista Island Super Cup
- Boa Vista Island Opening Tournament
