= Boa Vista Island Cup =

Football tournament in Cap Verde

Boa Vista (Bubista) Island SuperCup
- Founded: 2009
- Region: Boa Vista Island, Cape Verde
- Teams: 14
- Current champions: Sport Sal Rei Club (7th time)
- Most championships: Sport Sal Rei Club (7 titles)

The Boa Vista Island Cup, also known as Bubista Cup under the Boa Vista Creole name (ALUPEC: Taça da Dja da Boa Bista or Bubista) is a regional cup competition played during the season in the island of Sal, Cape Verde, it consists of all eight clubs of the island and are divided into three or four rounds. The competition is organized by the Boa Vista Regional Football Association.

The cup competition was founded in 2008 and first played in 2009 and is the third youngest in the country. The cup winner competes in the regional super cup final in the following season, when a cup winner also won the championship, a runner-up competes. For several seasons, the winner qualified into Cape Verdean Cup which has been cancelled due to financial and scheduling reasons.

Its recent cup winner is Sport Sal Rei Club and is the club who won the most cup titles numbering six. The upcoming cup final will be on March 31, another Boa Vista Derby will appear as it will feature Sal Rei and Académica Operária

== Winners ==
Season	Winner	Score	Runner-up
2008-09	Sport Sal Rei Club		
2009-10	Sport Sal Rei Club		
2010-11	SC África Show		
2011-12	Juventude do Norte		
2012-13	Sport Sal Rei Club	2–2 (5–4 pen)	Africa Show
2013-14	Onze Estrelas		
2014-15	Sport Sal Rei Club		Juventude
2015-16	Sport Sal Rei Club		Onze Estrelas
2016-17	Sport Sal Rei Club	2–0	Académica Operária
2017-18	Sport Sal Rei Club	2–0	Académica Operária

=== Performance by club ===
Club	Winners	Winning years
Sport Sal Rei Club	7	2009, 2010, 2013, 2015, 2016, 2017, 2018
SC África Show	1	2011
Juventude do Norte	1	2012
Onze Estrelas	1	2014

=== Performance by area ===
Settlement or city	Winners	Winning years
Sal Rei	7	2009, 2010, 2013, 2015, 2016, 2017, 2018
Bofareira (Note: Also known as Bafureira)	1	2014
Fundo das Figueiras	1	2012
Rabil	1	2011

== See also ==
- Boa Vista Island League
- Boa Vista Island Super Cup
- Boa Vista Opening Tournament
