= Boa Vista Island Opening Tournament =

- Founded: 2000
- Region: Boa Vista Island, Cape Verde
- Teams: 8
- Current champions: Sal Rei

The Boa Vista Island Opening Tournament (Portuguese: Torneio de Abertura da Boa Vista, Capeverdean Crioulo, ALUPEC or ALUPEK: Turnéu di Abertura di Bubista), is an opening tournament competition (equivalent to a league cup) played during the season in the island of Boa Vista, Cape Verde The competition is organized by the Boa Vista Regional Football Association. Some seasons featured rounds of one portion, some seasons featured three rounds and two groups with the top club of each group in the final match. It currently consists of seven rounds, a meeting with another club once. The winner with the most points (sometimes in the final) is the winner.

The first edition took place in 2000 and was the second regional competition after the championships.

== Winners ==
Season	Winner	Runner-up
2000	Sport Sal Rei Club	
2001-2004	Unknown	
2004-05	Académica Operária	
2006-07	Unknown	
2007-08	África Show	
2008-09	África Show	
2010-11	África Show	
2011-12	Juventude do Norte	
2012-13	Académica Operária	
2013-14	Sal Rei/Académica Operária (Note: No winner of the edition as it was postponed on December 22, the match was rescheduled after poor lighting came after sunset when the penalty shootout were about to be played on December 15)	
2014-15	Académica Operária	
2015-16	Académica Operária	
2016-17	Sport Sal Rei Club	Onze Estrelas
2017	Onze Estrelas	Sport Sal Rei Club

== See also ==
- Boa Vista Island Championships
- Boa Vista Island Cup
- Boa Vista Island Super Cup
