= Sport Sal Rei Club =

Sal-Rei FC
- Full name: Sal-Rei Futebol Clube; Sport Sal Rei Club
- Nicknames: Os Pretos & Brancos
- Founded: 28 August 1952
- Ground: Estadio Municipal Arsénio Ramos, Sal Rei, Cape Verde
- Capacity: 3,000
- Owner: Lin Fontes
- Chairman: Ogino Almeida
- Manager: Marley Monteiro
- League: Boa Vista Island League
- 2016–17: 1st, Champion
Home colours	Away colours

Sport Sal Rei Club (or as Sport Sal-Rei Clube) is a sports club whose football team has played in the Premier division and in the Boa Vista Island South Zone Division in Cape Verde. It is based in Sal Rei on the island of Boa Vista. Its current president is Ogino Almeida and its manager is Marley Monteiro. The club was once owned by Lin Fortes.

Sport Sal Rei Club is one of the most successful football club in Cape Verde and is Boa Vista's second most successful club, having won 19 official titles, only one is national and the remaining 18 are regional titles.

Apart from football, the club also has an athletics department.

== Logo ==
Its logo is similar to that of S.L. Benfica of Portugal, the middle reads S.S.R.C.

== History ==
The club was founded on August 28, 1952, and was the second affiliate of Benfica founded in Cape Verde and the area including present day Guinea Bissau. Sal Rei became an official member on 3 July 1992.

The club celebrated its 50th anniversary of its foundation on August 28, 2002.

Sal-Rei has won their only national title in 2004. Their first insular title was claimed in 1993 in which let them entered the Interinsular Division for the first time, their second won in 1997 in which they won two in a row, their third was in 1998, since 2004, the team had won five regional titles in a row from 2004 until 2008 and represented Boa Vista Island in their National or Interinsular Championships. When the team won their fourth insular title in 2004, they finished second behind Sal's Académico do Aeroporto, each had 11 points, that club scored 14, Sal Rei scored 12. Sal Rei's highest scoring matches were with four goals, 1st round with 4–0 over Santiago North's Estrela dos Amadores and a 4–0 win over Brava's Nô Pintcha at round 4. Then, the team made it up to the semis and faced FC Ultramarina, they had a three-goal apiece and Sal Rei advanced under away goals rule, they headed to the finals and challenged a team about 100 km south named Académica from the country's capital Praia and beat all two legs, 2–0 and 1–2 and claimed their first and only title in history. Overall the best scorer at the national championships was Ravs. Sal-Rei offered no advance into the 2005 CAF Champions League due to financial concerns.

Sal Rei came back for a stint for another national title in 2005 and repeatedly finished second with 3 wins and scored 9 goals, sixth most in the nation (second in the group). Their points were shared with Académica do Fogo, that club had two wins. Sal Rei headed to the semis and attempted to overturn Sporting Praia in successes, they won the first leg 2–1, first by Ravs, then by Cai, Sal Rei lost the second leg and their hopes for another national title faded. From that time, Sport Sal Rei Club's positions had been steadily slumping at the national divisions at group stage between 2005 and 2011, they were semi-finalist in 2005, third for the next two seasons, 4th in 2008 and 5th in 2011 and 2016. After winning a regional title in 2011, they came back to the nationals, all of their four matches ended in losses as it was once their worst season without any wins and scored a goal.

The club won the island's first cup title in 2009 and gave entry into the Cape Verdean Cup their only appearance, one of two clubs from the island, the other was Juventude do Norte, Sal Rei won their second title in a row in 2010 and brought their second entry into the national cup competition, one of some clubs. Their third was in 2013 and as cup winner faced the champion winner Onze Estrelas and won their first Super Cup title in 2013, in 2015 as a second placed cup winner, the club faced Académica e Operária and won their recent super cup title for Boa Vista.

=== Recent history ===
From late 2015 to December 2016, Ravi was manager who was also a former played who played for the club in the early 2000s. When he was coach, Sal Rei won their fifth regional cup title in 2016. Sal Rei went to their nationals, their next in five years and their ninth overall, they appeared in Group A but in 2016 appeared in Group B. Sal Rei made their 3–0 win over Vulcânicos at the first round at home field which was played on May 14 and this is Sal Rei's recent win at the nationals. Sal Rei suffered three straight losses with their worst, a 5–2 over Mindelense at the fourth round. The final match of the season was a three-goal draw with Académico 83, Sal Rei was immediately out from further competition at the knockout phase. Their strength were in 2016 with four points though they scored more goals numbering eight, but the worst 11 goals were conceded that season, the first of two.

Its manager is Marley Monteiro, a former player. Sal Rei took the lead in the first two rounds, second place they would be behind Onze Estrelas up to the 7th round and as of the 12th round, first place with 29 points, five above Onze Estrelas. At the 13th round, a win over Sanjoanense but their second straight title for Boa Vista for the season and later participated in the 2017 championships in mid-May and in the revived three group system, the first with four clubs each, they now participate in Group C alongside the two Sporting affiliates (Brava and Praia) and São Vicente's FC Derby. Sal Rei's final regional result had the same 10 wins as last season and a point (32) and a goal (35) less. In the 2017, regional cup, Sal Rei headed to the cup finals for the third straight time and faced Académica Operaria and brought the only island derby to the cup final, Sal Rei became the island's only club to win three consecutive cup titles and now totals six.

At the 2017 national championships, no luck or hope for a playoff entry was offered to the club as they lost the first match to Sporting Brava, a team that was considered weaker to Sal Rei. Later, Sal Rei lost to Sporting Praia and Derby and currently Sal Rei has a four match losing streak at the nationals and the club will not participate in the knockout stage. Sal Rei finished last in the group without any wins and 11 goals were once more conceded which became their worst season for the club, it was another slump the club suffered, overall it was the worst in the nation.

Sal Rei competed in the 2017 regional super cup on October 24, the club qualified as champion, as Sal Rei was also cup winners, they faced the runner up in the cup competition Académica Operária and lost their chance for another title after losing the match 1–0.

Sal Rei started their 2017–18 regional season with the association cup. Sal Rei would finish second behind Onze Estrelas and lost the title. Sal Rei started the island championships for the season not in first place but in the mid position as they lost to Onze Estrelas 0–1 in the first round, Sal Rei got first place from Sporting at the third round with 6 points and 7 goals scored. Their challenge against Académica Operária who had a point difference was a 2–0 win and now has four more points than that club, the club at the fifth round was still in the lead and also number one in goal totals in Boa Vista Island with 11. As of the 7th round, Sal Rei has 16 points, shared with Onze Estrelas, Sal Rei and Sporting has 13 goals scored, the most in the region, more than Académica Operária and Onze Estrelas. Three additional wins luckily came for Sal Rei for the next three rounds and defeated second placed Onze Estrelas where they gained more positional difference over that club, then, a victory over Sporting and Estância Baixo who likely will finish last place as that club has no wins, also the result was 0–7 which made it the highest scoring match of the season. Next was a match with Africa Show instead of another win, they lost 2–1 to that club on March 3, another loss Sal Rei suffered, in the Boa Vista Derby, they lost to Académica Operária and Sal Rei was not alone for contesting a regional title, also Académica Operária, Africa Show, Sporting, Sanjoanense and Onze Unidos were contesting. Sal Rei had 25 points, a single point difference over Académica Operária and six more than Sporting. Sal Rei defeated Sanjoanense 1–5 on March 17 and took Sanjoanense out from contesting a regional title with Sal Rei, only the club and Académica Operaria was left. Sal Rei defeated 4–0 over Juventude in the final challenge of the season and finished first with 31 points, one over Académica Operária and another island championship title was won and an entry into the national competition which they are playing in Group A which will feature the Académicas of Praia and Porto Novo and the mighty Mindelense. Their first match was a draw with Académica do Porto Novo, champion of Santo Antão. Sal Rei's next four matches ended in sufferable losses and again, out from appearance in the semis. Their final national division match was with Mindelense, seemed it was not to be difficult match for Sal Rei as the match ended in a two-goal draw, Sal Rei finished last in Group and is immediately out from the knockout phase (and also from one that may become the planned reformatted national division). Sal Rei now got their 14th straight game without a win at the national championships.

In the 2017–18 regional super cup, Sal Rei defeated Sal Rei in the first round, then Estância Baixo in the semis, the Boa Vista derby was featured in the final played on March 31 where defeated Académica Operária with the score 2–0, the same result as to last season, only time occurred in the cup final with the same result.

== Rivalry ==
The club's only two rivalries are Académica Operária forming the Derby of Boa Vista Island, the only two on the island and with Sporting Boa Vista forming the Eternal Derby of Boa Vista (Derby Eterno da Boa Vista).

== Stadium ==
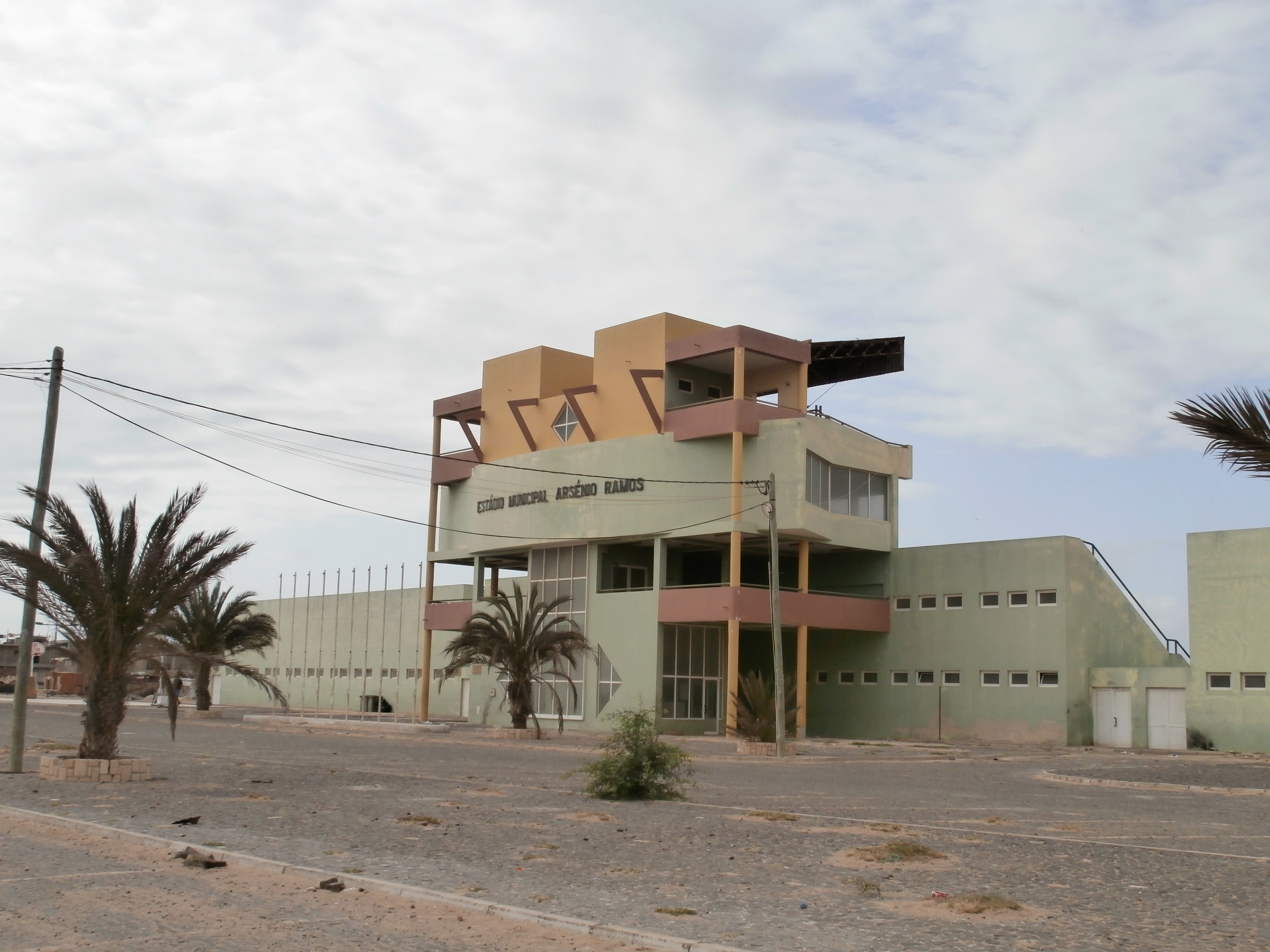
Estádio Arsénio Ramos, home of Sport Sal Rei Club

Estádio Municipal Arsénio Ramos is a multi-use stadium in Sal Rei, Cape Verde. It is currently used mostly for football matches. The stadium holds 500. The stadium is home to the island's best football clubs including Académica Operária and Sporting Boa Vista. It is also the home of Sanjoanense. The club also practices at the stadium.

== Uniform ==
Home uniform from 2015 to May 2017

Its uniform for home games are everything crimson with a white rim on each sides of the bottom part and the away/alternate color, not the same as Benfica's are blue. From 2015 to May 2017, its home uniform were red except for its shorts which are white.

== Honours ==
- National:
  - Cape Verdean Championship: 1

2004

- Regional:
  - Boa Vista (Bubista) Island Championships (League): 10

1993/94, 1997/98, 2003/04, 2004/05, 2005/06, 2006/07, 2007/08, 2010/11, 2015/16, 2016/17

  - Boa Vista (Bubista) Cup: 7

2009, 2010, 2013, 2015, 2016, 2017, 2018

  - Boa Vista (Bubista) Super Cup: 3

2010, 2013, 2015

  - Boa Vista (Bubista) Opening Tournament: 2

2000, 2016

== League and cup history ==
=== National championship ===
Season	Div.	Pos.	Pl.	W	D	L	GS	GA	GD	P	Notes	Playoffs
2004	1A	2	5	3	2	0	14	3	+11	11	Promoted into playoffs	Champion
2005	1A	2	5	3	1	1	9	6	+3	10	Promoted into playoffs	Semi-finalist
2006	1A	3	4	2	2	1	5	2	+3	7	Did not advance	Did not participate
2007	1A	3	5	2	2	1	6	9	-3	8	Did not advance	Did not participate
2008	1A	4	5	1	2	2	5	8	-3	5	Did not advance	Did not participate
2011	1A	5	4	0	0	4	1	8	-7	0	Did not advance	Did not participate
2016	1B	5	5	1	1	3	8	11	-3	4	Did not advance	Did not participate
2017	1C	4	6	0	0	6	1	11	-10	0	Did not advance	Did not participate
2018	1A	4	6	0	2	4	5	10	-5	2	Did not advance	Did not participate

=== Island/Regional Championship ===
Season	Div.	Pos.	Pl.	W	D	L	GS	GA	GA	P	Cup	Tour	Notes
2003–04	2	1	-	-	-	-	-	-	-	-			Promoted into the National Championships
2004–05	2	1	12	-	-	-	-	-	-	-			Promoted into the National Championships
2005–06	2	1	12	-	-	-	-	-	-	-			Promoted into the National Championships
2006–07	2	1	12	-	-	-	-	-	-	-			Promoted into the National Championships
2007–08	2	1	12	-	-	-	-	-	-	-			Promoted into the National Championships
2008–09	2	2	12	-	-	-	-	-	-	-	Winner		
2010–11	2	1	14	9	3	2	35	9	+26	30			Promoted into the National Championships
2013–14	2	2	14	10	1	3	25	15	+10	31			
2014–15	2	4	14	4	6	4	18	15	+3	18	Winner		
2015–16	2	1	14	10	3	1	36	10	+26	33	Winner	Winner	Promoted into the National Championships
2016–17	2	1	14	10	2	2	35	10	+25	32	Winner	2nd place	Promoted into the National Championships
2017–18	2	1	14	10	1	3	35	10	+25	31	Winner		Promoted into the National Championships

== Statistics ==
- Best position: 1st (national)
- Best position at a cup competition: 1st (regional)
- Best position at an opening tournament: 1st
- Appearances at cup competitions:
  - National: 2
  - Regional: 9
- Appearances at a regional Super Cup: 6
- Highest number of goals scored:, National: 14 (regular season), 20 (total)
- Highest number of points in a season: 11 (national)
- Highest number of wins in the national championships: 5 (2004)
- Worst season: 2017 (6 losses, 11 goals conceded)
- Lowest number of goals scored in a season: 1 (national)
- Lowest number of points in a season: 0 (national), in 2011 and in 2017
- Lowest number of wins in a season: 0 (national)
- Lowest number of draws in a season: 0 (national)
- Highest number of goals conceded in a season: 11 (national), 2016 and in 2017
- Highest number of losses in a season: 6 (national), 2017

== Managerial history ==
Name	Nationality	From	To
Djô Bracô	Cape Verde	in 2004	
Ravi	Cape Verde	late-2015	December 2016
Marley Monteiro	Cape Verde	since December 2016	
