= 2016–17 in Cape Verdean football =

Football in Cape Verde
- Season: 2016–17

Men's football
- 2017 Cape Verdean Football Championships: Sporting Clube da Praia

The 2016–17 season was the season of competitive football (soccer) in Cape Verde.

== Diary of the season ==
- early-October:
  - Janito Carvalho becomes coach for Académica da Praia
  - Cley becomes manager for ADESBA until February
  - Nelito (Antunes) again becomes coach for Boavista Praia for only two months, again in a season
- October 8: Mindelense won their super cup for São Vicente
- October 15: Mindelense won their first ever Champion's Cup for São Vicente
- October 29:
  - Académica do Porto Novo won their super cup title for Santo Antão South
  - Onze Estrelas won their super cup for Boa Vista, the first that the goals were awarded as Sal Rei fielded an ineligible player
  - CD Sinagoga won their only super cup title for Santo Antão North
  - the 2016–17 São Vicente Association Cup begins
- October 30: Boavista FC won their second friendly Boavista Champion's Cup title
- November: Cadoram became coach of CD Sinagoga of the Santo Antão North Zone
- November 4: the 2016-17 Santiago South First Division begins
- November 5: Varandinha of Tarrafal won the local GAFT Cup for 2016
- November 6:
  - Académica da Praia defeated ADESBA 3-0 and took the number one spot for Santiago South for only a week
  - Académica do Porto Novo won their second super cup title for Santo Antão
- November 12: the 2016-17 Santo Antão North Premier Division and South Zone Island Championships begins
- November 13:
  - Académico 83 won their super cup title for Maio
  - Desportivo da Praia defeated Travadores 1-2 and took the number one spot for Santiago South for two rounds, they had 9 points total at the third round
- November 19
  - Real Marítimo was the first club to win the Maio Champion's Cup
  - Vulcânicos won the first ever Fogo Champion's Cup
- November 25: the 2016-17 Santiago South Cup begins
- November 26:
  - the 2016-17 Fogo Island First Division begins
  - Académico do Aeroporto won their super cup title for Sal
- November 27: Académica da Brava won their super cup title for Brava
- December:
  - Nhela became coach for Batuque FC
  - Marley Monteiro becomes coach for Sport Sal Rei Club
  - Tó Monteiro becomes coach for Onze Estrelas
- mid-December: the 2016-17 Santiago North Zone First Division begins
- December 1: Académico do Aeroporto do Sal celebrated its 50th year of foundation
- December 3: Tchadense defeated Travadores 2-3 and took the number one spot for the next three weeks
- December 11: Batuque FC won their Opening Tournament title for São Vicente
- December 17
  - the 2016-17 Santiago Island North Zone First Division begins
  - the 2016-17 São Vicente Island/Regional First Division begins
- December 18: Sport Sal Rei Club own their Association Cup title for Boa Vista
- December 22: Vulcânicos defeated Baxada 2-0 and made it the highest scoring match of any tier 2 regional competitions for nearly two months, at tier 1 competitions, for four months
- December 30:
  - SC Santa Maria won their only Opening Tournament title for Sal
  - Renovations, enlargement and an additional artificial turf construction project at Estádio Municipal 25 de Julho begins
- mid-January:
  - Humberto Bettencourt became coach for Boavista Praia again in two years
  - Ney Loko became coach for Sporting Clube da Brava
- January 6: Sporting Praia defeated ADESBA 5-0 and after Tchadense's 0–2 loss to Desportivo da Praia, took the number one spot for the remainder of the season
- January 7: SC Atlético won their super cup title for São Nicolau
- January 13: the 2016-17 Boa Vista Island League begins
- January 14
  - the 2016-17 Maio Island First Division begins
  - the 2016-17 Sal Island First Division begins
  - the 2016-17 São Nicolau Island League begins
- January 15: Sporting Brava won their Opening Tournament title for Brava
- January 21: the 2016-17 Brava Island League begins
- Late-January:
  - Humberto Bettencourt becomes coach of Boavista Praia once more in 2 1/2 years
  - Pirico becomes coach for SC Atlético of Ribeira Brava
- February:
  - Daniel Cardoso becomes coach of AD Bairro
  - Carlos Sena Teixeira becomes president of AD Bairro
  - Alberto Teixeira becomes coach of Paulense
- February 7: Santiago North Zone season was suspended by its regional association for two weeks due to that the referees needed the salaries for the 17th and the 26th rounds last season and the rounds of this season.
- February 11: In Fogo's Second Division, Nova Era defeated Brasilim 0-20 and made it the highest scoring match of any division on the island in several seasons
- February 19:
  - Boavista Praia defeated Os Garridos 8-0 and made it the highest scoring match in the region in four seasons
  - Paulense of the Santo Antão North Zone became listed as champions and to claim their 7th title, the second club to qualify into the 2017 championships after Mindelense, qualified as national champion of the previous season
  - Rosariense Clube will return to the Santo Antão North Zone's second division after two seasons of participation
- February 25:
  - Santiago North Zone football (soccer) competitions resumed as the referees were paid four days earlier by its sponsorship of two telecommunications companies, one of them was Cabo Verde Telecom and the municipalities where the clubs are based, it did not rescheduled the starting date of the national championships
  - São Vicente Premier Division: Derby was awarded 3–0 as Académica Mindelo fielded ineligible players, the first of five that Académica Mindelo was awarded against.
- March 19: Académica do Porto Novo of the Santo Antão South Zone became champions and claimed their 11th title and qualified into the National Championships
- March 25: The Regional Championships of Santo Antão North and South (Premier and Second) Zones finished for the season, Paulense and Académica Porto Novo into the championships
- March 26: Sporting Brava became listed champions for Brava and qualified into the National Championships
- April 1: The Santo Antão Cup final was not played as Rosariense did not show up to play with Académica do Porto Novo
- April 2: CS Mindelense became regional champions for São Vicente
- April 7: Sporting Brava defeated Benfica Brava 0-14 and became the highest scoring match of any of the tier-2 (regional top-flight) competitions in the nation
- April 8: The Santo Antão South Cup final took place
- April 9: After the end of the 20th round, Sporting Praia got their 10th title for Southern Santiago (20+ overall) and qualified into the National Championship, their next in three years, also Sporting made a new point record for Santiago South numbering 52, exceeded their 49 they got in 2005, of any top-flight regional championship competitions, it is third behind Santiago North's Varandinha and Scorpion Vermelho.
- April 15:
  - Onze Unidos got 24 points, with four points ahead of a second placed club, Onze Unidos claimed their twelfth title for Maio, one week before the end of the regionals and qualified into the National Championships, their next in six years
  - GDRC Delta won their first and only Santiago South cup for the 2015–16 season (see 2015–16 in Cape Verdean football)
  - São Vicente Premier Division: Mindelense was awarded 3–0 as Académica fielded a suspended player, the last of five that Académica was awarded against
- April 17: Rosariense Clube Ribeira Grande won their next North Zone's cup in a decade
- April 22: Académica do Porto Novo won another cup title for the Santo Antão South Zone
- April 23:
  - Final competitions of the Maio Premier Division
  - Sport Sal Rei Club won their 10th title and their second straight for Boa Vista and qualified into the National Championships
  - Académica do Fogo defeated Baxada 14-0 and also became the highest scoring match of any regional tier-1 competitions in the nation alongside Sporting Brava's
  - Vulcânicos won their 10th title and their second straight for Fogo with 45 points and 66 goals, five more goals than the runner up and qualified into National Championships
- April 24: Officials found out that Académica Mindelo fielded a fake goalkeeper in five of its matches and its positions were dropped from first to fifth and kicked out of National qualification, it was replaced with FC Derby, earlier positions changed.
- April 29: CD Onze Unidos won their third cup title for Maio
- April 30:
  - Final competition of the Brava Island League and the Fogo, Sal Santiago South and São Vicente Premier Divisions
  - Académico do Aeroporto won their 14th championship title for Sal and qualified into the National Championships
  - CS Mindelense won their 49th regional title for São Vicente, as they were 2016 national champions, runner-up FC Derby also qualified into the 2017 National Championships
  - FC Ultramarina won their 12th championship title for São Nicolau and qualified into the National Championships
- May 5: Académica do Fogo won their cup title for Fogo
- May 6:
  - Académica do Sal won their fifth cup title for Sal
  - FC Derby won their fourth cup title for São Vicente
- May 7:
  - AJAC da Calheta de São Miguel, won their only regional championship title for Santiago North and qualified into the National Championships
  - Final competition of the São Nicolau Regional Championships took place
  - Sporting Clube da Praia claimed their regional cup title for Santiago South
- May 9: FC Ultramarina won their title for São Nicolau
- May 11: The Santiago North Regional Football Association deducted 3 points for AJAC and made Benfica Santiago North champions, AJAC fielded a suspended player Marco Aurélio at the 16th round match with Juventus Assomada, originally 2–4, it was originally awarded 3–0, AJAC did not. The Judicial Council removed AJAC as regional champions and punished that club and put Benfica de Santa Cruz for competition at the nationals, the declaration became official. It was the next ina season after Scorpion Vermelho-Varandinha. The relegation of AJAC de Calheta has been eliminated and Juventus Assomada became officially relegated as they finished 11th and inside the relegation zone.
- May 13:
  - The 2017 Cape Verdean Football Championships begins, it was divided into three groups again and the first with four clubs each.
  - Onze Unidos defeated Ultramarina 2-1 and became the highest result of the national season
- May 17: In Praia, the Capeverdean Football Federation (FCF) officially declared AJAC regional champions on May 17 and qualifies into the national competition as the suspended player in a 16th round match was not fielded and did not score a single goal that match.
- May 18: Chairman of AJAC, Amarildo Semedo did not liked that decision alongside some other clubs, and justice in sports is preserved.
- May 20: Sporting Praia defeated Sal Rei 3-0 and became the season's highest match and also the highest goal difference
- May 28: Mindelense (Group B) and Sporting Praia (Group C) currently has the most points each numbering 9
- June 3: Académica Porto Novo defeated Académico do Aeroporto Sal 1-3 and became the second match being the season's highest
- June 11: Académico do Aeroporto defeated Paulense 1-3 and became the third match being the season's highest
- June 18:
  - Académica Porto Novo defeated Paulense 3-0 and became the fourth match being the season's highest
  - End of group stage of the National Football Championships
- June 24: Semifinals of the National Football Championships begins
- June 27: the Ultramarina Tarrafal-Mindelense semifinal match was cancelled twice
- July 1: Original date of the end of semifinals of the National Football Championships
- July 3–4: the Ultramarina Tarrafal-Mindelense semifinal match was removed due to that Estádio Orlando Rodrigues had no spare keys for the players to enter
- July 8: the Capeverdean Football Federation unofficially awarded Mindelense 0–3 in the first leg against Ultramarina de Tarrafal, Ultramarina started to appeal
- July 15:
  - Finals of the National Championships originally to begin but was rescheduled again
  - Ultramarina appealed and the 3-0 that were unofficially awarded to Mindelense was revoked, the date of the first leg match was set
- July 23: Ultramarina Tarrafal-Mindelense second leg match delayed
- August 13: Mindelense had their squad ready but did not appear to play in the matches later rescheduled, the club was disqualified, Ultramarina Tarrafal advanced into the finals
- August 20: Sporting Praia defeated Ultramarina 1–2 at Estádio Orlando Rodrigues in Tarrafal de São Nicolau
- August 27: Sporting Praia again defeated Ultramarina, this time with the result 3-2 and at home and claimed their 10th and recent national championship title
- Tarrafal's Estrela dos Amadores celebrated its 25th year of the club's foundation

== Final standings ==
=== Cape Verdean Football Championships ===
This was the second season divided into three groups and the first with a knockout stage. FC Ultramarina (Group A), CS Mindelense (of Group B) and Sporting Praia (Group C) finished first and qualified into the playoffs. The best second placed club who finished first Académica do Porto Novo also qualified. Another delay occurred in July and was the next such delay in nine years. The stadium access to Estádio Orlando Rodrigues was locked as the stadium did not have extra keys for the first leg due to an unknown reason. A week later, Mindelense was unofficially awarded 3-0 and the club was still no entrant into the finals. Ultramarina appealed to the problems with their entry into the stadium. It caused the next delay of the national championship finals competition in nine years (but not overall). The first leg was rescheduled, Mindelense did not show up for unknown reasons and Mindelense-Ultramarina Tarrafal club strength was probably 50/50, it wasn't held into August and after August 13, Mindelense was indeed disqualified and its second leg result was annulled, but several kept it as stood. As Mindelense lost 0–2 in the second leg and the first leg unheld. Mindelense was out of the competition and overall was fourth behind Académica Porto Novo. The match between Sporting Praia and Académica Porto Novo went one and won with a total of two goals to one with a victory in the second leg, Sporting had to wait 1 1/2 months for their final appearance where they won all two legs and won their next national title in five years.

==== Group A ====
Pos	Team	Pld	W	D	L	GF	GA	GD	Pts
1	FC Ultramarina	6	4	1	1	11	6	+5	13
2	Onze Unidos	6	3	2	1	9	5	+3	11
3	AJAC da Calheta	6	1	2	3	7	11	-4	5
4	Vulcânicos	6	1	1	4	7	11	-4	4

==== Group B ====
Pos	Team	Pld	W	D	L	GF	GA	GD	Pts
1	CS Mindelense (C)	6	4	1	1	8	3	+5	13
2	Académica do Porto Novo	6	3	2	1	12	7	+5	11
3	Académico do Aeroporto	6	1	2	3	6	10	-4	5
4	Paulense DC	6	0	3	3	4	10	-6	3

==== Group C ====
Pos	Team	Pld	W	D	L	GF	GA	GD	Pts
1	Sporting Clube da Praia	6	4	2	0	8	1	+7	14
2	FC Derby	6	3	1	1	9	4	+5	10
3	Sporting Clube da Brava	6	3	1	2	6	5	+1	10
4	Sport Sal Rei Club	6	0	0	6	1	11	-10	0

==== Best second placed club ====
The second placed club with the most points (sometimes goals and matches if equal) qualified into the knockout stage.

Pos	Team	Pld	W	D	L	GF	GA	GD	Pts
1	Académica do Porto Novo	6	3	2	1	12	7	+5	11
2	Onze Unidos	6	3	2	1	9	5	+3	11
3	FC Derby	6	3	1	2	7	5	+2	10

==== Final Stages ====
Semi-Finals				Finals
CS Mindelense			0
FC Ultramarina Tarrafal (São Nicolau)	0	2	2	Ultramarina Tarrafal (São Nicolau)	1	2	3
Sporting Praia	1	1	2	Sporting Clube da Praia	2	3	5
Académica do Porto Novo	1	0	1

== Island or regional competitions ==
=== Regional Championships ===
Competition	Champions	
Competition	Premier	Second
Boa Vista	Sport Sal Rei Club	
Brava	Sporting Brava	
Fogo	Vulcânicos	Nova Era
Maio	Onze Unidos	Miramar
Sal	Académico do Aeroporto	ASGUI
Santiago North Zone	AJAC da Calheta	GDR São Lourenço
Santiago South Zone	Sporting Praia	Ribeira Grande de Santiago
Santo Antão North Zone	Paulense	Rosariense
Santo Antão South Zone	Académica Porto Novo	
São Nicolau	Ultramarina de Tarrafal	
São Vicente	CS Mindelense	GS Castilho

=== Regional Cups ===
Competition	Winners
Boa Vista	Sport Sal Rei Club
Fogo	Académica do Fogo
Maio	Onze Unidos
Sal	Académica do Sal
Santiago South Zone	Sporting Praia
Santo Antão Cup	Undecided
Santo Antão North Zone	Rosariense
Santo Antão South Zone	Académica do Porto Novo
São Nicolau	Ultramarina Tarrafal
São Vicente	FC Derby

=== Regional Super Cups ===
The 2016 champion winner played with a 2016 cup winner (when a club won both, a second place club competed).

Competition	Winners
Boa Vista	Onze Estrelas
Brava	Académica da Brava
Fogo	Canceled
Maio	Académico 83
Sal	Académico do Aeroporto
Santiago South	Cancelled
Santo Antão Cup (single)	Académica do Porto Novo
Santo Antão North	CD Sinagoga
Santo Antão South	Académica do Porto Novo
São Nicolau	SC Atlético
São Vicente	CS Mindelense

=== Regional Opening Tournaments/Association Cups ===
Competition	Winners	
Competition	Premier	Second
Boa Vista	Sport Sal Rei Club	Non-existent
Brava	Sporting Brava	Non-existent
Fogo	Unknown	Non-existent
Maio	Unknown	Non-existent
Sal	Santa Maria	Non-existent
Santiago South Zone	Not held	Non-existent
São Nicolau	SC Atlético	Non-existent
São Vicente (Note: Known as the Association Cup)	Batuque FC	São Pedro

=== Regional Champions Cup ===
Each of the three islands held their first ever Champion's Cup

Competition	Winners
Fogo	Vulcânicos
Maio	Real Marítimo
São Vicente	CS Mindelense

== Transfer deals ==
=== Summer-Fall transfer window ===
The September/October transfer window runs from the end of the previous season in September up to mid-October.

- (Cape Verde) Adyr from CS Mindelense to FC Ultramarina Tarrafal
- (Cape Verde) Calú from (Moldova) FC Zimbru Chişinău to Académica Mindelo
- (Cape Verde) Nildo from Académica Praia to Sporting Praia
- (Cape Verde) M. Teixeira from Desportivo Praia to Sporting Praia
- (Nigeria) Matthew Mbutidem Sunday from Boavista Praia to Sporting Clube da Praia

=== Winter transfer window ===
- 31 January: (Cape Verde) Calú from Académica do Mindelo to (Portugal) Gil Vicente F.C.

== See also ==
- 2016 in Cape Verde
- 2017 in Cape Verde
- Timeline of Cape Verdean football
