= Estádio Municipal 20 de Janeiro =

Sports stadium in Maio, Cape Verde

- Location within Cape Verde
- Location: Cidade do Maio, Maio, Cape Verde
- Coordinates: 15.137°N 23.2052°W
- Owner: Maio Regional Football Association
- Capacity: 1,000

Construction
- Opened: 2008

Tenants
- Académica da Calheta; Barreirense; Académico 83; Onze Unidos

Estádio Municipal 20 de Janeiro is a multi-use stadium in Maio, Cape Verde. Its location is east of the town center of Cidade do Maio about 300 meters nearly south of the Maio-Figueira da Horta Road (EN3-MA01), the Maio Circular Route and is in the residential sector. It stadium is named after a holiday named Heroes Day It is currently used mostly for football matches and is the home stadium of Académico 83 and Onze Unidos. Every other clubs from the island based outside Cidade do Maio including Académica da Calheta and Barreirense plays at the stadium. The stadium is operated by the Maio Regional Football Association (ARFM). The stadium holds 1.000 people (some sources says 4,000) and size is 100 m × 64 m (328 ft × 210 ft) and its grass is artificial.

Every football (soccer) championships of the Maio Island League along with the Maio Cup, the Maio Super Cup and the Maio Opening Tournament are played at the stadium. Also track and field at the regional level (Boa Vista-Maio) are played.

== Early stadium ==
The previous stadium Estádio Municipal do Maio was opened around the 1970s. The regional championships were first held until 1991. The stadium closed down in 2008 and moved it 300 meters to the south. Industrial and business buildings popped up in the same time in that area. Today the old stadium is abandoned and has disused seats there. A few trees have grown on the abandoned field.

== Modern stadium ==
Construction started in the mid 2000s. The stadium was first opened in, 2008. The first regional cup, super cup and opening tournament competitions took place in 2011. Artificial grass has recently been added.

== See also ==
- List of football stadiums in Cape Verde
- Maio Island League
