= Maio Regional Football Association =

Football association in Cape Verde

Santiago South Regional Association
- Founded: 1990
- Location: Cidade do Maio
- President: Odílio Neves
- Affiliations: Cape Verdean Football Federation
- Website: Official website

Maio Regional Football Association (Portuguese: Associação Regional de Futebol do Maio, abbreviation: ARFMS) is a football (soccer) association covering the island of Maio in Cape Verde. It is headquartered in Cidade do Maio. It is affiliated to the Capeverdean Football Federation. Its current president is Odílio (Odílio Neves) who became in late 2016.

The league are several that have a premier and a second division, six clubs participate in the premier and five clubs participate in the second division, a club with the most points promotes into the regional premier division the following season while the last placed club from the regional premier division is relegated into the second division the following season.

== History ==
The association was founded in 1990. In the 2000s, it had only seven clubs until 2017, after, the 2017-18 season was the first featuring eight clubs.

The Second Division was formed in 2015 and consisted of four clubs, it would have consist of five clubs for the 2016-17 season, as Beira Mar withdrew due to financial reasons, it continued to have four participating clubs. The Second Division for the 2017-18 season was entirely reduced to four clubs.

The club totals which was eleven in the 2015-16 season had the same number of registered clubs with Santo Antão North, it was ranked as having the sixth most number of clubs in the nation, more than the clubs from São Nicolau and Santo Antão. The addition of Santa Clara took the club past Santo Antão North to become the only association being sixth in the most number of clubs in the nation, behind Sal and São Vicente.

Until 2016, all clubs played in both divisions, Beira-Mar is the only club relegated and Real Marìtimo became the eighth club to enter the Premier Division.

== Organization ==
The association also organizes and functions the regional championships, the Cup, the Super Cup, the Opening Tournament and now the Champions' Cup (equivalent to Champions' Trophy). The association has 12 registered clubs. The regional champion competes in the National Championships each season, once did in the cup (2007-2012) competition who competed at the national level. The regional championships has two divisions.

- Maio Premier Division (8 clubs)
- Maio Second Division (4 clubs)

== Registered clubs ==
The region's registered clubs as of November 2017 include:

- Académica do Maio - Calheta
- Académico 83 - Cidade do Maio
- Beira-Mar - Cidade do Maio
- Barreirense
- Cruzeiro - Calheta do Maio
- Figueirense - Figueira da Horta
- SC Miramar - Ribeira Dom João
- Morrerense - Morro
- CD Onze Unidos - Cidade do Maio
- Real Marítimo - Cascabulho
- Santa Clara - Alcatraz and Pilão Cão, registered in 2016
- Santana de Morrinho
