= 2006–07 in Cape Verdean football =

Football in Cape Verde
- Season: 2006–07

Men's football
- 2007 Cape Verdean Football Championships: Sporting Clube da Praia

In the 2006–07 season of competitive football (soccer) in Cape Verde It was the first season that the national cup competition took place, its first winner was Académica da Praia.

== Diary of the season ==
- September 25 - CS Marítimo do Porto Novo celebrated its 25th anniversary
- The Cape Verdean Football Federation celebrated its 25th anniversary
- November: Paulense celebrated its 25th anniversary
- Sport Sal Rei Club won their 6th title for Boa Vista
- SC Morabeza won their 3rd title for Brava
- Vulcânicos FC won their 6th title for Fogo
- Académica da Calheta won their 1st title for Maio
- Académico do Aeroporto won their 8th title for Sal
- Scorpion Vermelho won their 1st title for Santiago North
- Sporting Clube da Praia won their 3rd title for Santiago South
- Rosariense won their 2nd title Santo Antão North
- Sporting Clube do Porto Novo won their 2nd title for Santo Antão South
- FC Ultramarina won their 7th title for São Nicolau
- Académica do Mindelo won their 10th and recent title for São Vicente
- May 12:
  - 2007 Cape Verdean Football Championships began
  - Académico do Aeroporto defeated Sporting Porto Novo 8-0 and made it the highest scoring match for the season
- May 30: The match between Académica Praia and Vulcânicos was rescheduled, Académica Praia won 1-0
- May 31: The match between Morabeza and Sal Rei was rescheduled, Sal Rei won 3-1
- June 9: Académica do Mindelo defeated Sal Rei 6-0 and made it the season's second highest scoring match
- June 24: Regular season ends
- June 30: Knockout stage begins
- July 14: Championship finals begins
- July 21 - Sporting Clube da Praia claimed their 6th national championship title
- August 25, - the 2007 Cape Verdean Cup begins
- August 30 - Group stage of the national cup begins
- September 1 - Académica da Praia won their only national cup title

== Final standings ==
=== Cape Verdean Football Championships ===
Académica do Mindelo and Académico do Aeroporto were first in each group along with two Praia based teams Sporting and Académica, second of each group. Académica Mindelo had the most points numbering 13, second was Académico do Aeroporto with 11, two Praia based teams Sporting and Académica had ten each which was third. Académica Mindelo scored the most with 16 goals followed by Sporting Praia with 11 and Académico do Aeroporto with 10. In the semis, Sporting Praia advanced with 6 goals scored each they defeated Académico do Aeroporto with three goals and Académica do Mindelo who defeated Académica Praia with a 1-0 result each leg, both of the clubs are Académica de Coimbra affiliates. In the finals, the first match ended in a scoreless draw, the final leg ended in a goal draw, Sporting Praia scored a goal at the last minute of stoppage time, being an away goal, Sporting Praia won their sixth championship match

==== Group A ====
Pos	Team	Pld	W	D	L	GF	GA	GD	Pts
1	Académica do Mindelo	5	4	1	0	16	0	+16	13
2	Sporting Clube da Praia	5	3	1	1	11	1	+10	10
3	SC Sal Rei	5	2	2	1	6	9	-3	8
4	FC Ultramarina	5	2	2	1	6	9	-3	8
5	SC Morabeza	5	0	2	3	3	10	-7	2
6	Académica da Calheta	5	0	2	3	3	13	-10	2

==== Group B ====
Pos	Team	Pld	W	D	L	GF	GA	GD	Pts
1	Académico do Aeroporto	5	3	2	0	10	3	+7	11
2	Académica da Praia	5	3	1	1	6	3	+3	10
3	Vulcânicos FC	5	3	0	2	8	5	+3	9
4	Rosariense Clube	5	2	1	2	5	3	+3	7
5	Scorpion Vermelho	5	2	0	3	5	5	0	6
6	Sporting Clube do Porto Novo	5	0	0	5	5	20	-15	0

==== Final Stages ====
Semi-Finals				Finals
Sporting Clube da Praia	3	3	6
Académico do Aeroporto	2	1	3	Sporting Clube da Praia	0	1	1
Académica da Praia	0	0	0	Académica do Mindelo	0	1	1
Académica do Mindelo	1	1	2

Leading goalscorer: Kadú - 9 goals

=== Cape Verdean Cup ===
The second ever Cape Verdean Cup took place (their last was in 1982). It became one of the most recent nations to hold their own Académica Praia won their first cup title after defeating Académica do Sal 3–1 in the final.

==== Participants ====
- Spartak d'Aguadinha, winner of the Fogo Island Cup
- Académica da Calheta, winner of the Maio Island Cup
- Académica do Sal, winner of the Sal Island Cup
- Académica da Praia, winner of the Santiago South Cup
- Rosariense Clube, winner of the Santo Antão Cup
- AJAT'SN, winner of the São Nicolau Cup
- FC Derby, winner of the São Vicente Cup

=== Island or regional competitions ===
==== Regional Championships ====
Competition	Winners	
Competition	Premier	Second
Boa Vista	Sport Sal Rei Club	
Brava	SC Morabeza	
Fogo	Vulcânicos	
Maio	Académica da Calheta	
Sal	Académico do Aeroporto	
Santiago North Zone	Scorpion Vermelho	
Santiago South Zone	Sporting Praia	Ribeira Grande
Santo Antão North Zone	Rosariense	
Santo Antão South Zone	Sporting Clube do Porto Novo	
São Nicolau	FC Ultramarina	
São Vicente	Académica do Mindelo	

==== Regional Cups ====
Competition	Winners
Fogo	Spartak d'Aguadinha
Maio	Académica da Calheta
Sal	Académica do Sal
Santiago South Zone	Académica da Praia
Santo Antão North Zone	Rosariense
Santo Antão South Zone	Unknown
São Nicolau	AJAT'SN
São Vicente	FC Derby

==== Regional Super Cups ====
The 2006 champion winner played with a 2006 cup winner (when a club won both, a second place club competed).

Competition	Winners
Sal	Not held
Santo Antão South	Académica do Porto Novo
São Nicolau	FC Ultramarina
São Vicente	Académica do Mindelo

==== Regional Opening Tournaments ====
Competition	Winners
Boa Vista	
Fogo	
Maio	
Sal	Palmeira Santa Maria
Santiago South Zone	
Santo Antão North Zone	Beira-Mar
Santo Antão South Zone	Académica do Porto Novo
São Nicolau	Belo Horizonte
São Vicente	Académica do Mindelo

== See also ==
- 2006 in Cape Verde
- 2007 in Cape Verde
- Timeline of Cape Verdean football
