= 2007 Cape Verdean Football Championships =

Cape Verdean Football Championship
- Season: 2007
- Champions: Sporting Clube da Praia
- Matches played: 36
- Goals scored: 93 (2.58 per match)
- Top goalscorer: Kadú (9)
- Biggest home win: Académico do Aeroporto
- Highest scoring: Académica do Mindelo

The 2007 Cape Verdean Football Championship season was the 28th of the competition of the first-tier football in Cape Verde. Its started on 12 May and finished on 21 July, earlier than the last season. The tournament was organized by the Cape Verdean Football Federation. Sporting would win their 6th title and second straight after defeating Académica do Mindelo under the away goals rule, the only time it happened, the scorer was Dário who scored their only goal at the finals during stoppage time. They would have entry to the 2008 CAF Champions League. No second place team would also participate in the 2008 CAF Confederation Cup

== Overview ==
Sporting Clube da Praia was the defending team of the title. A total of 12 clubs participated in the competition, one from each island league and one who won the last season's title. As Sporting Praia won the 2006 national title, Académica da Praia, runner-up of the island division would compete in the championships.

The season at the time would have the second club to win two back-to-back titles after CS Mindelense in 1976 and 1977.

Scorpion Vermelho was the first participant of the north of Santiago that came from the municipality of Santa Cruz.

The biggest win was Académico do Aeroporto who won 8-0 against Sporting from Porto Novo, the most goals was Académica do Mindelo. In the knockout stage, three of the four clubs would be with the name Académic-, The Battle of Académica would feature two homonymous clubs from Praia and Mindelo and the latter would win two goals (one per match).

== Participating clubs ==

Participating football (soccer) clubs of the 2007 Cape Verdean Football Championships (Cape Verde)
- Sporting Clube da Praia, winner of the 2006 Cape Verdean Football Championships
- SC Sal Rei, winner of the Boa Vista Island League
- SC Morabeza, winner of the Brava Island League
- Vulcânicos FC, winner of the Fogo Island League
- Académica da Calheta, winner of the Maio Island League
- Académico do Aeroporto, winner of the Sal Island League
- Scorpion Vermelho, winner of the Santiago Island League (North)
- Académica da Praia, runner-up of the Santiago Island League (South)
- Rosariense, winner of the Santo Antão Island League (North)
- Sporting Clube do Porto Novo, winner of the Santo Antão Island League (South)
- FC Ultramarina, winner of the São Nicolau Island League
- Académica do Mindelo, winner of the São Vicente Island League

=== Information about the clubs ===
Club	Location
Académica da Calheta	Calheta
Académica (Mindelo)	Mindelo
Académica da Praia	Praia
Académico do Aeroporto	Espargos
SC Morabeza	Vila Nova Sintra
Rosariense Clube	Ribeira Grande
SC Sal Rei	Sal Rei
Scorpion Vermelho	Santa Cruz
Sporting Clube da Praia	Praia
Sporting Clube do Porto Novo	Porto Novo
FC Ultramarina	Tarrafal de São Nicolau
Vulcânicos FC	São Filipe

== League standings ==
=== Group A ===
Pos	Team	Pld	W	D	L	GF	GA	GD	Pts
1	Académica do Mindelo	5	4	1	0	16	0	+16	13
2	Sporting Clube da Praia	5	3	1	1	11	1	+10	10
3	SC Sal Rei	5	2	2	1	6	9	-3	8
4	FC Ultramarina	5	2	2	1	6	9	-3	8
5	SC Morabeza	5	0	2	3	3	10	-7	2
6	Académica da Calheta	5	0	2	3	3	13	-10	2

=== Group B ===
Pos	Team	Pld	W	D	L	GF	GA	GD	Pts
1	Académico do Aeroporto	5	3	2	0	10	3	+7	11
2	Académica da Praia	5	3	1	1	6	3	+3	10
3	Vulcânicos FC	5	3	0	2	8	5	+3	9
4	Rosariense Clube	5	2	1	2	5	3	+3	7
5	Scorpion Vermelho	5	2	0	3	5	5	0	6
6	Sporting Clube do Porto Novo	5	0	0	5	5	20	-15	0

== Results ==
Week 1
Home	Score	Visitor	Date
Ultramarina	0 - 3	Académico Mindelo	12 May
Sporting Praia	5 - 0	Académica Calheta	13 May
Morabeza	1 - 3	Sal Rei	31 May
Académico Aeroporto	8 - 3	Sporting Porto Novo	12 May
Scorpion Vermelho	1 - 0	Rosariense	13 May
Académica Praia	1 - 0	Vulcânicos	30 May

Week 2
Home	Score	Visitor	Date
Académica Calheta	0 - 1	Ultramarina	19 May
Sal Rei	1 - 0	Sporting Praia	19 May
Académico Mindelo	3 - 0	Morabeza	20 May
Sporting Porto Novo	0 - 2	Scorpion Vermelho	19 May
Rosariense	2 - 1	Académica Praia	19 May
Vulcânicos	0 - 1	Académico Aeroporto	19 May

Week 3
Home	Score	Visitor	Date
Ultramarina	0 - 0	Sal Rei	26 May
Académico Mindelo	4 - 0	Académica Calheta	26 May
Morabeza	0 - 2	Sporting Praia	26 May
Académica Praia	0 - 0	Académico Aeroporto	26 May
Rosariense	3 - 0	Sporting Porto Novo	26 May
Scorpion Vermelho	2 - 3	Vulcânicos	27 May

Week 4
Home	Score	Visitor	Date
Sporting Praia	4 - 0	Ultramarina	9 June
Académico Mindelo	6 - 0	Sal Rei	9 June
Académica Calheta	1 - 1	Morabeza	9 June
Sporting Porto Novo	1 - 3	Académica Praia	9 June
Académico Aeroporto	1 - 0	Scorpion Vermelho	9 June
Rosariense	0 - 1	Vulcânicos	9 June

Week 5
Home	Score	Visitor	Date
Ultramarina	1 - 1	Morabeza	17 June
Sporting Praia	0 - 0	Académico Mindelo	23 June
Sal Rei	2 - 2	Académica Calheta	23 June
Académico Aeroporto	0 - 0	Rosariense	24 June
Vulcânicos	4 - 1	Sporting Porto Novo	24 June
Scorpion Vermelho	0 - 1	Académica Praia	24 June

== Final Stages ==
Semi-Finals				Finals
Sporting Clube da Praia	3	3	6
Académico do Aeroporto	2	1	3	Sporting Clube da Praia	0	1	1
Académica da Praia	0	0	0	Académica do Mindelo	0	1	1
Académica do Mindelo	1	1	2

=== Semi-finals ===
30 June 2007

Sporting Clube da Praia	3:2	Académico do Aeroporto
Alex 93'

Estádio da Várzea
Praia
1 July 2007

Académica da Praia	0:1	Académica do Mindelo
		Adelino 81'

Estádio da Várzea
Praia
7 July 2007
16:00 (CVT)

Académico do Aeroporto	1:3	Sporting Clube da Praia

Estádio Marcelo Leitão
Espargos
Referee: Victor Lima
7 July 2007
16:00 (CVT)

Académica do Mindelo	1:0	Académica da Praia

Estádio Municipal Adérito Sena
Mindelo
Referee: Isaias Livramento

=== Finals ===
14 July 2007

Sporting Clube da Praia	0:0	Académica do Mindelo

Estádio da Várzea
Praia
Referee: Nelson Barbosa
21 July 2007

Académica do Mindelo	1:1	Sporting Clube da Praia
Kelly 70'		Dário 90+4'

Estádio Municipal Adérito Sena
Mindelo
Referee: Joaquim Xavier

Sporting Praia won all two legs under away goals rule and claimed the national title.

Cape Verdean Football 2007
Champions
Sporting Clube da Praia
6th title

== Statistics ==
- Top scorer: Kadú: 9 goals (Académica do Mindelo)
- Biggest win: Académico Aeroporto 8-3 Sporting Porto Novo (May 12)

== See also ==
- 2006–07 in Cape Verdean football
- 2007 Cape Verdean Cup
