= List of Paulense DC records and statistics =

Paulense Desportivo Clube is a Capeverdean football (soccer) club based in Pombas and serves the municipality of Paul. The club was founded in 1981 and played its first official competition in 1995. Paulense currently play in the Santo Antão North Premier Division and is a current participant in the 2017 Cape Verdean Football Championships. Since the addition of the regional 2013 Second Division, they have never been lower than the second tier.

This list encompasses the records set by the club and its statistics.

The club currently holds the record for the most Santo Antão North titles with 7.

All stats accurate as the end of the 2017 regular season

== Records and statistics ==
- Best position: Semifinalist (national)
- Best position at cup competitions: 1st (regional)
- Best position at an opening tournament: 1st
- Appearances:
  - National: 7
  - Regional Championships: 22
- Appearances at cup competitions:
  - National: Once, in 2012
  - Santo Antão Cup: 3
  - Regional: 13
- Appearances at a Super Cup competition:
  - Santo Antão South Zone: 5
  - Santo Antão: 2
- Total matches played, National: 29 (regular season), 31 (with playoffs)
  - Total matches played at home: 14
  - Total matches played away: 16 (17 with a match awarded)
- Total wins: 8 (national)
  - Total wins at home: 4
  - Total wins away: 4
- Total draws: 7 (national)
  - Total draws at home: 4
  - Total draws away: 3
- Total goals scored: 30 (national)
- Total points: 18 (national)
- Highest number of goals scored in a season: 7 (national), in 2005
- Highest number of points in a season: 10 (national), in 2015
- Highest number of wins in a season: 3 (national), on 2015
- Longest winning streak: 10 (March 28, 2014 – March 28, 2015)
- Most games without a loss at the Regional Championships: 13 (February 16, 2014 – March 28, 2015)
- Most games without a loss at home at the Regional Championships: 6 (February 16, 2014 – March 28, 2015)
- Most games without a loss away at the Regional Championships: 17 (since mid-2013)
- Worst position: 6th place (regional)
- Lowest number of goals scored in a season: 3 (national), in 2004 and in 2013
- Lowest number of points in a season: 3 (national), three seasons
- Lowest number of wins in a season: 0 (national), in 2017
- Highest number of goals conceded in a season: 21 (regional), in 2018
- Highest number of matches lost in a season: 8, in 2018
- Total losses: 14 (national)
- Total goals conceded: 42 (national)
- Worst defeat at the National Championships: Académico do Aeroporto 6-0 Paulense, 29 May 2004

Other:

- Appearance at the Mindelo Cup: Once, in 2016

== National championship record by opponent ==
Paulense DC's first team has competed in a number of regionally and nationally contested leagues, and its national tier record against each club faced in these competitions is listed below. The team that Paulense has met most in national championships competition are Académica do Porto Novo and Académica Operária whom they have contested 3 matches each before the start of the current 2017 season.

Académica do Sal and Sal Rei have also defeated Paulense in league competition on two occasions, which represents the most Paulense have lost against any club. Paulense have won two of the matches against Académico 83, which represents the most Paulense have won against any club. Paulense have drawn more matches with Académica Porto Novo and Académica Operária than with any other club; out of the 6 national championship matches between the two teams, 4 have finished without a winner.

=== Key ===
- † Teams with this background and symbol in the "Club" column are competing in the 2017 National Championships alongside Paulense
- P = matches played; W = matches won; D = matches drawn; L = matches lost; F = Goals scored; A = Goals conceded; Win% = percentage of total matches won

=== All-time championship record ===
Statistics correct as of the end of the 2017 regular season

Paulense national championship record by opponent
Club	P	W	D	L	P	W	D	L	P	W	D	L	F	A	Win%
Club	Home				Away				Total						Win%
Académica do Fogo	1	0	1	0					1	0	1	0	2	2	0%
Académica do Mindelo	1	0	0	1					1	0	0	1	0	4	0%
Académica do Porto Novo	3	1	2	0	2	0	1	1	5	1	3	1	4	6	20%
Académica Operária	1	1	0	0	2	0	2	0	3	1	2	0	4	3	33.33%
Académica do Sal	1	0	0	1					1	0	0	1	2	1	0%
Académico 83	1	1	0	0	1	1	0	0	2	2	0	0	6	1	100%
Académico do Aeroporto do Sal	1	0	0	1	3	0	1	2	4	1	1	2	2	12	0%
SC Atlético					1	0	0	1	1	0	0	1	1	3	0%
Amabox Barcelona	1	0	1	0					1	0	1	0	0	0	0%
Batuque					1	0	0	1	1	0	0	1	1	2	0%
Cutelinho FC					1	0	0	1	1	0	0	1	2	3	0%
FC Derby	1	0	0	1	1	1	0	0	2	1	0	1	1	1	50%
Desportivo Ribeira Brava					1	1	0	0	1	1	0	0	3	0	100%
Estrela dos Amadores	1	1	0	0					1	1	0	0	3	0	100%
Grémio Nhágar	1	1	0	0					1	1	0	0	1	2	0%
CS Mindelense	2	1	0	1	3	0	1	2	5	1	1	3	2	8	20%
Nô Pintcha					1	0	0	1	1	0	0	1	0	1	0%
Sport Sal Rei Club	1	0	0	1	1	0	0	1	2	0	0	2	1	4	0%
Spartak d'Aguadinha					1	1	0	0	1	1	0	0	1	0	100%
Sporting Brava					1	0	1	0	1	0	1	0	1	1	0%
Sporting Praia	1	0	0	1					1	0	0	1	0	1	0%
Total	17	5	5	7	20	4	5	11	37	9	13	21	35	55	24.32%
