= 2005–06 in Cape Verdean football =

Football in Cape Verde
- Season: 2005–06

Men's football
- 2006 Cape Verdean Football Championships: Sporting Clube da Praia

In the 2005–06 season of competitive football (soccer) in Cape Verde

== Diary of the season ==
- No football competition of the Santiago Island League (North) took place
- Avenida 77 and Jentabus football (soccer) clubs established, based in Praia on the island of Santiago
- Paiol and Praia Rural merged into Unidos do Norte
- Sporting Clube do Porto Novo celebrated its 50th anniversary of foundation of the club
- October 15: CD Travadores celebrated its 75th anniversary of its foundation of the club and the sports department
- January 1 - Benfica da Brava celebrated its 10th anniversary of its foundation
- January 22 - No sports competitions due to the parliamentary elections that took place
- February 12 - No sports competitions due to the presidential elections that took place
- February 14 - Académica do Porto Novo celebrated its 25th anniversary
- Sport Sal Rei Club won their 5th title for Boa Vista
- Nô Pintcha won their 11th and recent title for Brava
- Botafogo won their 16th title for Fogo
- Barreirense won their 1st title for Maio
- Académico do Aeroporto won their 7th title for Sal
- Sporting Clube da Praia won their 2nd title for Santiago South
- Beira Mar won their only title Santo Antão North
- Sporting Clube do Porto Novo won their 1st title for Santo Antão South
- FC Ultramarina won their 6th title for São Nicolau
- CS Mindelense won their 43rd title for São Vicente
- May 1: Vitória da Praia celebrated its 75th anniversary
- May 5: 2006 Cape Verdean Football Championships began
- May 6: Derby defeated Sporting Porto Novo 3-0 and was the highest match for two rounds and being the sole one for a round
- May 13: Sal Rei defeated Sporting Porto Novo away 0-3 and made it the second match being the highest which lasted for a round
- May 21: Académico do Aeroporto defeated Barreirense from Maio 6-1 and made it the highest scoring match for a round
- June 1: The match between Sal Rei and Nô Pintcha was rescheduled to June 1, Sal Rei won 2-0
- June 4:
  - Derby defeated Brava's Nô Pintcha 7-1 and made it the highest scoring match of the season
  - 18:00: Regular season ends
- July 10: Knockout stage begins
- June 17: Académico do Aeroporto defeated Botafogo 6-0 and made it another match being the second highest of the season, one of three and one of the highest ever at the knockout stage of the national championships
- June 24: Championship finals begins
- July 2 - Sporting Clube da Praia claimed their 5th national championship title

== Final standings ==
=== Cape Verdean Football Championships ===
FC Derby and Académico do Aeroporto were first in each group along with Botafogo of São Filipe and Sporting Praia, second of each group. Académico do Aeroporto do Sal and Sporting Praia had the most points numbering 12 . Derby scored the most with 13 goals followed by Académico do Aeroporto with 12 goals, Botafogo with nine and Sporting with eight. In the semis, Académico do Aeroporto advanced into the finals with 8 goals scored in two matches, the largest in the second leg match where they defeated Botafogo 6-0 in Espargos which made it one of the highest scored match at the knockout stage of the national championships. Also Sporting Praia advanced to the finals with 2 goals scored over Derby in two legs, Sporting won the first with 2 goals and Derby won the second with a goal. In the finals, Sporting defeated Sal's Académico do Aeroporto at Estádio Marcelo Leitão in Espargos 0-1, the match in Praia ended in a two goal draw, with a total of 3 goals scored by Sporting Praia, they won their fifth championship match, their next in four years

=== Group A ===
Pos	Team	Pld	W	D	L	GF	GA	GD	Pts
1	FC Derby	4	3	1	0	13	2	+11	10
2	Botafogo	4	2	2	0	9	3	+6	8
3	SC Sal Rei	4	2	2	1	5	2	+3	7
4	Nô Pintcha	4	1	0	3	4	12	-8	3
5	Sporting Clube do Porto Novo	4	0	0	4	0	12	-12	0

=== Group B ===
Pos	Team	Pld	W	D	L	GF	GA	GD	Pts
1	Académico do Aeroporto	5	4	0	1	12	3	+9	12
2	Sporting Clube da Praia	5	4	0	1	8	4	+4	12
3	FC Ultramarina	5	2	1	2	6	9	0	7
4	CS Mindelense	5	2	0	3	6	7	-1	6
5	Beira-Mar	5	1	1	3	5	8	-3	4
6	Barreirense FC	5	1	0	4	4	13	-9	2

==== Final Stages ====
Semi-Finals				Finals
Botafogo	2	0	2
Académico do Aeroporto	2	6	8	Académico do Aeroporto	0	2	2
Sporting Clube da Praia	2	0	2	Sporting Clube da Praia	1	2	3
FC Derby	0	1	1

Leading goalscorer: Mendes - 7 goals

=== Island or regional competitions ===
==== Regional Championships ====
Competition	Winners	
Competition	Premier	Second
Boa Vista	Sport Sal Rei Club	
Brava	Nô Pintcha	
Fogo	Botafogo	Unknown
Maio	Barreirense	
Sal	Académico do Aeroporto	
Santiago North Zone	Not held	
Santiago South Zone	Sporting Praia	GDRC Vila Nova
Santo Antão North Zone	Beira Mar	
Santo Antão South Zone	Sporting Clube do Porto Novo	
São Nicolau	FC Ultramarina	
São Vicente	CS Mindelense	

==== Regional Cups ====
Competition	Winners
Fogo	Botafogo
Sal	Académico do Aeroporto
Santiago South Zone	Unknown
Santo Antão North Zone	Unknown
Santo Antão South Zone	Académica do Porto Novo
São Nicolau	Belo Horizonte
São Vicente	Batuque FC

==== Regional Super Cups ====
The 2005 champion winner played with a 2005 cup winner (when a club won both, a second place club competed).

Competition	Winners
Sal	Not held
São Nicolau	FC Ultramarina
São Vicente	CS Mindelense

==== Regional Opening Tournaments ====
Competition	Winners
Boa Vista	Unknown
Fogo	
Maio	
Sal	Académico do Aeroporto
Santiago South Zone	
Santo Antão North Zone	Paulense
Santo Antão South Zone	
São Nicolau	Unknown
São Vicente	CS Mindelense

== See also ==
- 2005 in Cape Verde
- 2006 in Cape Verde
- Timeline of Cape Verdean football
