= 2019 Cape Verdean Football Championships =

40th season of the Cape Verdean Football Championships

Cape Verdean Football Championships
- Season: 2019

The 2019 Cape Verdean Football Championships is the 40th season of the Cape Verdean Football Championships, the top-tier football league in Cape Verde.

== Overview ==
A total of 12 clubs participate in the national championship (Campeonato Nacional). Cape Verdean clubs in the nine inhabited islands will play between late 2017 and early 2018 in the eleven regional leagues, where each league winner qualify for the national championship. The defending champions also qualify, and if they win their regional league, the runner-up of their league also qualifies.

== Teams ==
Team	Qualifying method	Group
Académica da Praia	Winner of the 2018 Cape Verdean Football Championships	Group A
Onze Estrelas Clube de Bofareira	Winner of the 2018–19 Boa Vista Island Championships	Group C
Sporting Clube da Brava	Winner of the 2018–19 Brava Island Championships	Group B
Académica do Fogo	Winner of the 2018–19 Fogo Island League	Group A
Académico 83 do Porto Inglês	Winner of the 2018–19 Maio Island Championships	Group B
GD Oásis Atlântico	Winner of the 2018–19 Sal Premier Division	Group C
GD Varandinha	Winner of the 2018–19 Santiago North Premier Division	Group C
GD Recreativo e Cultural Celtic da Praia	Winner of the 2018–19 Santiago South Premier Division (or runner-up if winner is Académica da Praia)	Group C
UD Santo Crucifixo	Winner of the 2018–19 Santo Antão North Premier Division	Group B
Académica do Porto Novo	Winner of the 2018–19 Santo Antão South Island Championships	Group A
FC Ultramarina	Winner of the 2018–19 São Nicolau Island Championships	Group B
CS Mindelense	Winner of the 2018–19 São Vicente Island Championships	Group A

== Group stage ==
Group winners and best runners-up advance to semi-finals

=== Group A ===
Pos	Team	Pld	W	D	L	GF	GA	GD	Pts	Qualification
1	CS Mindelense	6	3	2	1	8	4	+4	11	Qualification for Knockout stage
2	Académica da Praia	6	2	2	2	4	4	0	8	
3	Académica do Porto Novo	6	1	4	1	7	9	−2	7	
4	Académica do Fogo	6	0	4	2	3	5	−2	4	

Source: Soccerway

=== Group B ===
Pos	Team	Pld	W	D	L	GF	GA	GD	Pts	Qualification
1	FC Ultramarina	6	3	2	1	13	9	+4	11	Qualification for Knockout stage
2	UD Santo Crucifixo	6	2	2	2	7	5	+2	8	
3	Sporting Clube da Brava	6	2	2	2	9	12	−3	8	
4	Académico 83 do Porto Inglês	6	1	2	3	8	11	−3	5	

Source: Soccerway

=== Group C ===
Pos	Team	Pld	W	D	L	GF	GA	GD	Pts	Qualification
1	GD Oásis Atlântico	6	3	2	1	7	8	−1	11	Qualification for Knockout stage
2	Onze Estrelas Clube de Bofareira	6	3	1	2	5	4	+1	10	Qualification for Knockout stage
3	GD Recreativo e Cultural Celtic da Praia	6	2	3	1	6	1	+5	9	
4	GD Varandinha	6	0	2	4	4	9	−5	2	

Source: Soccerway

== Knockout stage ==
Semifinals (19 & 25–26 May)
Onze Estrelas Clube de Bofareira	2	1	3
CS Mindelense	2	3	5
FC Ultramarina	1	1	2 (6)
GD Oásis Atlântico (a.e.t.), (p)	1	1	2 (7)

Final (1 June)
CS Mindelense	3
GD Oásis Atlântico	1

== Final clubs' stadiums ==
Team	Location	Stadium	Capacity
CS Mindelense	Mindelo	Estádio Municipal Adérito Sena	5,000
GD Oásis Atlântico	Santa Maria		
