= 2007 Cape Verdean Cup =

2007 Cape Verdean Cup Taça Nacional de Cabo Verde
Tournament details
- Dates: 25 August–1 September 1
- Teams: 7

Final positions
- Champions: Académica da Praia
- Runners-up: Académica do Sal

Tournament statistics
- Matches played: 10

The 2007 Cape Verdean Cup (Taça Nacional de Cabo Verde de 2007) season was the 2nd competition of the regional football cup in Cape Verde. The season started on 25 August and finished with the cup final on 1 September. The cup competition was organized by the Cape Verdean Football Federation (Federação Caboverdiana de Futebol, FCF). All the matches are played at Estádio da Várzea. Académica da Praia won their only cup title.

A total of seven clubs participated.

== Participating clubs ==
- Spartak d'Aguadinha, winner of the Fogo Island Cup - played in Group A
- Académica da Calheta, winner of the Maio Island Cup - played in Group A
- Académica do Sal, winner of the Sal Island Cup - played in Group A
- Académica da Praia, winner of the Santiago South Cup - played in Group B
- Rosariense Clube, winner of the Santo Antão Cup - played in Group A
- AJAT'SN, winner of the São Nicolau Cup - played in Group B
- FC Derby, winner of the São Vicente Cup - played in Group B

== Group stage ==
The top of each group qualified into the final, they were Académica do Sal of Group A and Académica da Praia

=== Group A ===
Pos	Team	Pld	W	D	L	GF	GA	GD	Pts
1	Académica da Praia	3	2	1	0	6	2	+4	7
2	Spartak d'Aguadinha	3	2	0	1	-	-	-	6
3	Rosariense Clube	3	1	1	1	8	5	+3	4
4	Académica da Calheta	3	0	0	3	-	-	-	11

=== Group B ===
Pos	Team	Pld	W	D	L	GF	GA	GD	Pts
1	Académica do Sal	2	2	0	0	8	1	+7	6
2	FC Derby	2	1	0	1	3	4	-1	3
3	AJAT'SN	2	0	0	2	1	7	-6	0

== Final ==
1 September 2007

Académica da Praia	3-1	Académica do Sal

Estádio da Várzea
Praia

== See also ==
- 2006–07 in Cape Verdean football
- 2007 Cape Verdean Football Championships
