= Maio Champion's Cup =

Maio Champion's Cup Maio Champion's Trophy
- Founded: 2016
- Region: Maio Island, Cape Verde
- Teams: 2
- Current champions: Onze Unidos (1st time)

The Maio Champion's Cup or the Maio Champion's Trophy (Portuguese: Taça da Campeões de Maio, Capeverdean Creole: ALUPEK: Tasa da Kampionis di Maiu) is a single knockout football (soccer) competition that is played each season in the island of Maio, Cape Verde. The competition features the champion from the Premier Division and the champion of the Second Division. The trophy competition is organized by the Maio Regional Football Association (Associação Regional do Maio, ARFM). Its current winner is Onze Unidos who won their only title.

The Champion's Cup (or Trophy) was introduced in 2016. The first edition took place in November, 2016 and featured Académico 83 (Premier Division) and Real Marítimo (Second Division) which were the first club to participate.

== Winners ==
Premier Division Champion
Second Division Champion

Season	Winner	Score	Runner-up
2016	Real Marítimo		Académico 83
2017	Onze Unidos		Miramar

=== Performance By Club ===
Club	Winners	Winning years
Onze Unidos	1	2017
Real Marítimo	1	2016

=== Performance by area ===
Settlement or city	Winners	Winning years
Cascabulho	1	2016
Maio, Cidade do	1	2017

== See also ==
- Maio Premier Division
- Maio Second Division
- Maio Island Cup
- Maio Super Cup
- Maio Opening Tournament
