= 2006 Cape Verdean Football Championships =

Cape Verdean Football Championship
- Season: 2006
- Champions: Sporting Clube da Praia
- Matches played: 35
- Goals scored: 90 (2.57 per match)
- Top goalscorer: Mendes (7)
- Biggest home win: Derby
- Highest scoring: Derby

The 2006 Cape Verdean Football Championship season was the 26th of the competition of the first-tier football in Cape Verde. Its started on 6 May and finished on 2 July, earlier than the last season. The tournament was organized by the Cape Verdean Football Federation. Sporting Praia won their 5th title and in the following year participated in the 2007 CAF Champions League. No second place club participated in the 2007 CAF Confederation Cup.

== Overview ==
Three clubs returned again, FC Derby, Sporting Praia and Mindelense, some others returned in some or several years, two clubs Barreirense FC and Beira Mar competed for the first time.

FC Derby was the defending team of the title. A total of 11 clubs participated in the competition, one from each island league and one who won the last season's title. The Santiago Island League North Zone had no championships for the 2005-06 season. No extra team participated as the season had only 11 clubs.

The season marked the last appearance of Nô Pintcha at the nationals, a club who won a lot of regional title at the time.

The biggest win and score was Derby who defeated Nô Pintcha 7-1, the second largest was Académico do Aeroporto who defeated Barreirense 6-1. Académico do Aeroporto scored 6 points against Botafogo in the semis.

Dário continued his career for his second season with the club after playing with several Portuguese clubs including Paços Ferreira. He scored a goal in second leg of the finals at the 45th minute.

== Participating clubs ==

Participating football (soccer) clubs of the 2006 Cape Verdean Football Championships (Cape Verde)
- FC Derby, winner of the 2005 Cape Verdean Football Championships
- Sport Sal Rei Club, winner of the Boa Vista Island League
- Nô Pintcha, winner of the Brava Island League
- Botafogo, winner of the Fogo Island League
- Barreirense, winner of the Maio Island League
- Académico do Aeroporto, winner of the Sal Island League
- Sporting Clube da Praia, winner of the Santiago Island League (South)
- Beira Mar, winner of the Santo Antão Island League (North)
- Sporting Clube do Porto Novo, winner of the Santo Antão Island League (South)
- FC Ultramarina, winner of the São Nicolau Island League
- CS Mindelense, winner of the São Vicente Island League

=== Information about the clubs ===
Club	Location
Académico do Aeroporto	Espargos
Barreirense FC	Barreiro
Beira Mar	Ribeira Grande
Botafogo	São Filipe
FC Derby	Mindelo
CS Mindelense	Mindelo
Nô Pintcha	Furna
Onze Unidos	Vila do Maio
Sport Sal Rei Club	Sal Rei
Sporting Clube da Praia	Praia
FC Ultramarina	Ribeira Brava

== League standings ==
=== Group A ===
Pos	Team	Pld	W	D	L	GF	GA	GD	Pts
1	FC Derby	4	3	1	0	13	2	+11	10
2	Botafogo	4	2	2	0	9	3	+6	8
3	SC Sal Rei	4	2	2	1	5	2	+3	7
4	Nô Pintcha	4	1	0	3	4	12	-8	3
5	Sporting Clube do Porto Novo	4	0	0	4	0	12	-12	0

=== Group B ===
Pos	Team	Pld	W	D	L	GF	GA	GD	Pts
1	Académico do Aeroporto	5	4	0	1	12	3	+9	12
2	Sporting Clube da Praia	5	4	0	1	8	4	+4	12
3	FC Ultramarina	5	2	1	2	6	9	0	7
4	CS Mindelense	5	2	0	3	6	7	-1	6
5	Beira-Mar	5	1	1	3	5	8	-3	4
6	Barreirense FC	5	1	0	4	4	13	-9	2

== Results ==
Week 1
Home	Score	Visitor	Date
Derby	3 - 0	Sporting Porto Novo	7 May
Sal Rei	2 - 0	Nô Pintcha	1 June
Mindelense	1 - 0	Barreirense	6 May
Sporting Praia	2 - 0	Ultramarina	6 May
Académico Aeroporto	2 - 0	Beira-Mar	6 May

Week 2
Home	Score	Visitor	Date
Botafogo	1 - 1	Derby	13 May
Sporting Porto Novo	0 - 3	Sal Rei	13 May
Ultramarina	0 - 1	Académico Aeroporto	13 May
Beira-Mar	0 - 2	Mindelense	14 May
Barreirense	0 - 2	Sporting Praia	14 May

Week 3
Home	Score	Visitor	Date
Sal Rei	0 - 0	Botafogo	20 May
Nô Pintcha	1 - 0	Sporting Porto Novo	21 May
Mindelense	1 - 2	Sporting Praia	20 May
Académico Aeroporto	6 - 1	Barreirense	21 May
Beira-Mar	1 - 1	Ultramarina	21 May

Week 4
Home	Score	Visitor	Date
Derby	2 - 0	Sal Rei	28 May
Nô Pintcha	2 - 3	Botafogo	29 May
Beira-Mar	1 - 2	Barreirense	28 May
Ultramarina	2 - 1	Mindelense	29 May
Sporting Praia	1 - 0	Académico Aeroporto	29 May

Week 5
Home	Score	Visitor	Date
Botafogo	5 - 0	Sporting Porto Novo	25 May
Derby	7 - 1	Nô Pintcha	4 June
Sporting Praia	1 - 3	Beira-Mar	3 June
Barreirense	1 - 3	Ultramarina	3 June
Académico Aeroporto	3 - 1	Mindelense	3 June

== Final Stages ==
Semi-Finals				Finals
Botafogo	2	0	2
Académico do Aeroporto	2	6	8	Académico do Aeroporto	0	2	2
Sporting Clube da Praia	2	0	2	Sporting Clube da Praia	1	2	3
FC Derby	0	1	1

=== Semi-finals ===
10 June 2006

Botafogo	2:2	Académico do Aeroporto

Estádio 5 de Julho
São Filipe
10 June 2006

Sporting Clube da Praia	2:0	FC Derby

Estádio da Várzea
Praia
17 June 2006

Académico do Aeroporto	6:0	Botafogo

Estádio Marcelo Leitão
Espargos
17 June 2006

FC Derby	1:0	Sporting Clube da Praia

Estádio Alcindo Nascimento
Mindelo

=== Finals ===
24 June 2006

Académico do Aeroporto	0:1	Sporting Clube da Praia
		Gerson 3'

Estádio Marcelo Leitão
Espargos
Referee: Orlando Araújo
2 July 2006

Sporting Clube da Praia	2:2	Académico do Aeroporto
Dário 43'; Quiroga 90'		Mendes 62'; Hernâni 93'

Estádio da Várzea
Praia
Referee: Victor Lima

Cape Verdean Football 2006
Champions
Sporting Clube da Praia
5th title

== Statistics ==
- Top scorer: Mendes: 7 goals (of Académico do Aeroporto)
- Highest scoring match: Derby 7-1 Nô Pintcha (June 4)

== See also ==
- 2005–06 in Cape Verdean football
