= 2018 Taça Nacional de Cabo Verde =

Tournament details
- Country: Cape Verde

Final positions
- Champions: Sporting Clube da Praia

The 2018 Taça Nacional de Cabo Verde is the 6th edition of the Taça Nacional de Cabo Verde, the knockout football competition of Cape Verde. The competition, which is played out in a tournament between the cup winners of the nine islands, returns for the first time since 2012.

== Preliminary stage ==
=== North Zone ===
- Santo Antão Norte: Rosariense Clube da Ribeira Grande (Ribeira Grande)
- Santo Antão Sul: Associação Académica do Porto Novo (Porto Novo)
- São Vicente: Batuque Futebol Clube (Mindelo)
- São Nicolau: Futebol Clube Ultramarina

Qualifying round [May 26]

Académica do Porto Novo 1-0 Rosariense

Batuque 4-1 Ultramarina

=== Center Zone ===
- Sal: Sport Clube Santa Maria (Santa Maria)
- Boa Vista: Sport Sal-Rei Clube (Sal-Rei)

Qualifying round [May 27]

Santa Maria 4-0 Sal-Rei

=== South Zone ===
==== Group 1 ====
- Maio: Club Desportivo Onze Unidos (Porto Inglês)
- Santiago Norte: regional cup not played
- Santiago Sul: Sporting Clube da Praia (Cidade da Praia)

Qualifying round [May 27]

Onze Unidos 1-1 Sporting da Praia [1-1 aet; 1-2 pen]

==== Group 2 ====
- Fogo: Associação Académica do Fogo (São Filipe)
- Brava: Sport Clube Morabeza (Nova Sintra)

Qualifying round [May 27] Académica Fogo 1-1 Morabeza [1-1 aet; 0-3 pen]

== First stage ==
Qualifying round [Jun 1]

Académica do Porto Novo 0-2 Sporting da Praia

Batuque bye

Santa Maria bye

Morabeza bye

== Final stage ==
Played at Estádio da Várzea, Cidade da Praia.

=== Semi-finals ===
[Jun 6]

Batuque 1-1 Sporting da Praia [2-4 pen]

[Jun 7]

Santa Maria 1-0 Morabeza

=== Final ===
[Jun 9]

Sporting da Praia 2-1 Santa Maria

== See also ==
- 2018 Cape Verdean Football Championships
