= 2018 Cape Verdean Football Championships =

Cape Verdean Football Championships
- Season: 2018
- Champions: Académica da Praia
- Matches played: 41

The 2018 Cape Verdean Football Championship season is the 39th beginner level (likely amateur) competition of the first-tier football in Cape Verde. Also it was another season that it was sponsored by a clothing company Tecnicil, it was also known as the 2018 Cape Verdean Tecnicil football season or the 2018 Tecnicil Football Championships. The championship was governed by the Cape Verdean Football Federation. The season began earlier started on 7 April 2018 and finished on 2 June.

Académica da Praia won their only national championship title, their last Cape Verdean title was won in 1965 which was a provincial title, used until independence in 1975. Académica Praia will likely to participate in the CAF Champions League competition in 2018, no runner-up of the championships, Mindelense will participate in the 2017 CAF Confederation Cup

== Overview ==
The triangular phase was used for the second straight time, fifth overall, it was also the second season with four clubs each and with playoffs. A total of 12 clubs participated in the competition, one from each island league and one who won the last season's title. The top club from each group qualified for the first time as well as the club with the most points of a second position of each group qualified into the semis.

The finals featured only one leg, the last time that the championship had one leg was in 1985. The final was played in Porto Novo, the most populated place in the island of Santo Antão. A week after the championship final, the cup final took place.

A total of 12 clubs participated in the national championship (Campeonato Nacional). Cape Verdean clubs of the nine inhabited islands played between late 2017 and early 2018 in the eleven regional leagues (Santiago and Santo Antão ha stwo each), where each championship (league) winner qualified for the national championship. The defending champions Sporting Praia also qualified, the club finished fourth in the regional season, four positions Académica Praia, made the next few seasons that a club qualified only as 2017 national champions.

The season was the second time featuring three groups where the top three qualifies alongside the second placed club with the most points (if one has the same, it may include the most goals scored) into the knockout phase.

FC Belo Horizonte, based in Juncalinho in the east of São Nicolau was the recent first timer into the national championships, also it was the next from that island in nearly 28 years being fourth ever.

Group A featured the champions of Boa Vista, Santo Antão South, Santiago South and São Vicente, Group B featured the champions of Brava, Santo Antão North, Santiago North and São Nicolau and Group C featured the national champion of the previous season and champions of Fogo, Maio and Sal.

Académica Praia and Mindelense met three times in the season, the group stage and the final, the next in two seasons, also it was the first that the club met twice in group stage and once in the final.

== Participating clubs ==

Participating football (soccer) clubs of the 2018 Cape Verdean Football Championships (Cape Verde)

Team	Qualifying method	Group
Sporting Clube da Praia	Winner of the 2017 Cape Verdean Football Championships	Group C
Sport Sal Rei Club	Winner of the Boa Vista Island League	Group A
SC Morabeza	Winner of the Brava Island Championships	Group B
Vulcânicos FC	Winner of the Fogo Premier Division	Group C
Barreirense FC	Winner of the Maio Premier Division	Group C
Palmeira Sta. Maria	Winner of the Sal Premier Division	Group C
CD Scorpion Vermelho	Winner of the Santiago North Premier Division	Group B
Académica da Praia	Winner of the Santiago South Premier Division	Group A
Os Foguetões	Winner of the Santo Antão North Premier Division	Group B
Académica do Porto Novo	Winner of the Santo Antão South Island Championships	Group A
Belo Horizonte Juncalinho	Winner of the São Nicolau Island League	Group B
CS Mindelense	Winner of the São Vicente Premier Division	Group A

== Group stage ==
Final table.

=== Group A ===
Pos	Team	Pld	W	D	L	GF	GA	GD	Pts
1	Académica da Praia	6	3	2	1	6	4	+2	11
2	CS Mindelense (Note: Qualified as the first of three clubs finished second of each group)	6	2	4	0	6	4	+2	10
3	Académica Porto Novo	6	2	2	2	8	7	+1	8
4	Sport Sal Rei Club	6	0	2	4	5	10	-5	2

=== Group B ===
Pos	Team	Pld	W	D	L	GF	GA	GD	Pts
1	CD Os Foguetões	6	3	2	1	5	4	+1	11
2	CD Scorpion Vermelho (Note: Scorpion Vermelho finished second as they had 2 away goals)	6	2	3	1	8	6	+2	9
3	FC Belo Horizonte (Note: FC Belo Horizonte finished third as they had one away goal)	6	2	3	1	9	5	+4	9
4	SC Morabeza	6	1	0	5	4	11	-7	3

=== Group C ===
Pos	Team	Pld	W	D	L	GF	GA	GD	Pts
1	GD Palmeira	6	3	1	2	8	7	+1	10
2	Sporting Clube da Praia	6	2	2	2	5	5	0	8
3	Vulcânico CF	6	2	2	2	4	4	0	8
4	Barreirense FC	6	1	3	2	7	8	-1	6

== Knockout stage ==
=== Semifinals ===
Semi-Finals				Finals
CS Mindelense	2	1	3
GD Palmeira	1	0	1	Académica da Praia	2
Académica da Praia	0	1	2	CS Mindelense	1
Os Foguetões	0	0	0

=== First legs ===
19 May 2018
16:00 (CVT, UTC-1)

CS Mindelense	2-1	GD Palmeira

Estádio Adérito Sena,
Mindelo
20 May 2018
16:00 (CVT)

Os Foguteões	0-0	Académica da Praia

Estádio João Serra
Ponta do Sol
26 May 2018
16:00 (CVT)

GD Palmeira	1-0	CS Mindelense

Estádio Marcelo Leitão
Espargos
27 May 2018
16:00 (CVT)

Académica da Praia	1-0	Os Foguetões

Estádio da Várzea
Praia

=== Final ===
2 June 2018
16:00 (CVT, UTC-1)

CS Mindelense	0-2 (a.e.t.)	Académica da Praia
		Ró 112'; Mike 119'

Estádio Municipal
Porto Novo
Attendance: 2,000
Referee: António Rodrigues

Cape Verdean Football 2018 Champions
Académica da Praia
1st title

== See also ==
- 2017–18 in Cape Verdean football
- 2018 Taça Nacional de Cabo Verde
