= Maio Creole =

Variant of Cape Verdean Creole from Maio Island

- Region: Maio Island
- Language family: Portuguese Creole: Afro-Portuguese Creole; Upper Guinea Creole; Maio Creole

Language codes
- ISO 639-3: –

Maio Creole is the name given to the variant of Cape Verdean Creole spoken mainly in the Maio Island of Cape Verde. It belongs to the Sotavento Creoles branch. It numbers the entire island population which includes a small part which also speaks Portuguese, in 2005, the percentage was 1.36%.

It is the eighth and one of the least spoken Cape Verdean Creole and is after Brava and ahead of Boa Vista.

== Characteristics ==
Besides the main characteristics of Sotavento Creoles the Maio Creole has also the following ones:

- The progressive aspect of the present is formed by putting stâ before the verbs: stâ + V.
- The unstressed final vowels /i/ and /u/ frequently disappear. Ex.: cumádr’ /kuˈmadɾ/ instead of cumádri /kuˈmadɾi/ “midwife”, vilúd’ /viˈlud/ instead of vilúdu /viˈludu/ “velvet”, bunít’ /buˈnit/ instead of bunítu /buˈnitu/ “beautiful”, cantád’ /kɐ̃ˈtad/ instead of cantádu /kɐ̃ˈtadu/ “sung”.
- The sound /dʒ/ (that originates from old Portuguese, written j in the beginning of words) is partially represented by /ʒ/. Ex. jantâ /ʒɐ̃ˈtɐ/ instead of djantâ /dʒɐ̃ˈtɐ/ “to dine”, jôg’ /ʒoɡ/ instead of djôgu /ˈdʒoɡu/ “game”, but in words like djâ /dʒɐ/ “already”, Djõ /dʒõ/ “John” the sound /dʒ/ remains.
