= 2017 Cape Verdean Football Championships =

Cape Verdean Football Championship
- Season: 2017
- Champions: Sporting Clube da Praia
- Matches played: 42
- Goals scored: 92 (2.19 per match)

The 2017 Cape Verdean Football Championship season was the 38th beginner level (likely amateur) competition of the first-tier football in Cape Verde. It started on 13 May and finished on 27 August, it started a days later than last season. Originally to finish on 15 July, instead, it was rescheduled to 27 August. The championship was governed by the Cape Verdean Football Federation.

Sporting Praia won their 10th and recent national championship title, also it was the club's next in five years. Sporting Praia did not participate in the CAF Champions League competition in 2018, Not even runner up Ultramarina Tarrafal participates in the 2017 CAF Confederation Cup, both of the clubs due to financial concerns, of any club, it is the eighth consecutive time and becomes the recent African nation not to bring a champion to the continentals for the most consecutive years, in the cup competition, Cape Verde is the longest for not bringing a club in Africa lasting for more than 15 years straight, not even the three national cup winners competed. Sporting Praia participated into the 2018 National Championships as champion of the 2017 season.

== Overview ==
The triangular phase started to be used for the 2017 season, it became the fourth time and first with four clubs each and with playoffs.

CS Mindelense was once more the defending team of the title. A total of 12 clubs participated in the competition, one from each island league and one who won the last season's title. The top club from each group qualified for the first time as well as the club with the most points of a second position of each group qualified into the semis for the first time.

Sporting Praia defeated Académica Porto Novo in the semis in its two legs, Sporting Praia won the first and the second one was scoreless, on the other Ultramarina defeated Mindelense 2-0 and qualified into the finals without the first leg played.

Six clubs returned again, on the other only AJAC da Calheta de São Miguel was the only first timer in the national championships.

No huge wins dominated a match this season, the highest result was no more than three goals which was a few matches, one of them the Sporting Praia-Ultramarina Tarrafal (São Nicolau) match which Sporting won 3-2. Académica Porto Novo scored the most goals in the regular season numbering 12. Overall Ultramarina Tarrafal (São Nicolau) scored the most goals totaling 16, followed by Sporting Praia with 15.

=== Delays ===
One match, between a Santiago North participant and Vulcânicos was delayed as the regional association deducted three points on May 11 where AJAC thought they fielded an ineligible player Marco Aurélio in a match with Juventus Assomada on April 1, they took it to court and on May 17, the FCF kept the result 2-4 and AJAC qualified into the national championships for the first time. The first round match was rescheduled to May 31.

Another delay occurred in July and was the next such delay in nine years (see 2008 Cape Verdean Football Championships). The stadium access to Estádio Orlando Rodrigues was locked as the stadium did not have extra keys for the first leg due to an unknown reason. A week later, Mindelense was unofficially awarded 3-0 and the club was still no entrant into the finals. Ultramarina appealed to the problems with their entry into the stadium. It caused the next delay of the national championship finals competition in nine years (but not overall). The first leg was rescheduled, Mindelense did not show up for unknown reasons and Mindelense-Ultramarina Tarrafal club strength was probably 50/50, it wasn't held into August and after August 13, Mindelense was indeed disqualified and its second leg result was annulled, but several kept it as stood. As Mindelense lost 0-2 in the second leg and the first leg unheld. Mindelense was out of the competition and overall was fourth behind Académica Porto Novo.

=== Finals ===
The finals featured Ultramarina and Sporting Praia, Ultramarina was the next appearance from São Nicolau in five years to appear in the finals after Atlético Ribeira Brava and the only one from the island who appeared twice. Sporting Praia regained their failed national title successes, Sporting won all two legs in Tarrafal de São Nicolau and the national capital Praia and went to claimed their 10th and recent title, also it was their next from Santiago South as well as the Santiago Island and Sotavento to win a title along with the national capital Praia.

== Participating clubs ==

Participating football (soccer) clubs of the 2017 Cape Verdean Football Championships (Cape Verde)
- CS Mindelense, winner of the 2016 Cape Verdean Football Championships
- Sport Sal Rei Club, winner of the Boa Vista Island League
- Sporting Clube da Brava, winner of the Brava Island League
- Vulcânicos, winner of the Fogo Premier Division
- Onze Unidos, winner of the Maio Premier Division
- Académico do Aeroporto, winner of the Sal Premier Division
- AJAC da Calheta, winner of the Santiago North Premier Division
- Sporting Clube da Praia, winner of the Santiago South Premier Division
- Paulense DC, winner of the Santo Antão North Premier Division
- Académica do Porto Novo, winner of the Santo Antão Island League (South)
- FC Ultramarina, winner of the São Nicolau Island League
- FC Derby, runner up of the São Vicente Premier Division

=== Information about the clubs ===
Club	Location	Venue	Capacity
Onze Unidos	Cidade do Maio	20 de Janeiro	4,000
Académica do Porto Novo	Porto Novo	Porto Novo	8,000
Académico do Aeroporto	Espargos	Marcelo Leitão	8,000
AJAC da Calheta	Calheta de São Miguel also serves São Miguel Municipality	Estádio da Calheta	1,000
FC Derby	Mindelo	Adérito Sena	5,000
Mindelense	Mindelo	Adérito Sena	5,000
Paulense Desportivo Clube	Paúl	João Serra	2,000
Sport Sal Rei Club	Sal Rei	Arsénio Ramos	500
Sporting Clube da Brava	Nova Sintra also serves Brava Island	Aquiles de Oliveira	500
Sporting Clube da Praia	Praia	Várzea	12,000
FC Ultramarina	Tarrafal de São Nicolau	Orlando Rodrigues	5,000
Vulcânicos	São Filipe	5 de Julho	1,000

== League standings ==
=== Group A ===
Pos	Team	Pld	W	D	L	GF	GA	GD	Pts
1	FC Ultramarina	6	4	1	1	11	6	+5	13
2	Onze Unidos	6	3	2	1	9	5	+3	11
3	AJAC da Calheta	6	1	2	3	7	11	-4	5
4	Vulcânicos	6	1	1	4	7	11	-4	4

=== Group B ===
Pos	Team	Pld	W	D	L	GF	GA	GD	Pts
1	CS Mindelense (C)	6	4	1	1	8	3	+5	13
2	Académica do Porto Novo	6	3	2	1	12	7	+5	11
3	Académico do Aeroporto	6	1	2	3	6	10	-4	5
4	Paulense DC	6	0	3	3	4	10	-6	3

=== Group C ===
Pos	Team	Pld	W	D	L	GF	GA	GD	Pts
1	Sporting Clube da Praia	6	4	2	0	8	1	+7	14
2	FC Derby	6	3	1	1	9	4	+5	10
3	Sporting Clube da Brava	6	3	1	2	6	5	+1	10
4	Sport Sal Rei Club	6	0	0	6	1	11	-10	0

=== Best second placed club ===
The second placed club with the most points (sometimes goals and matches if equal) qualified into the knockout stage.

Pos	Team	Pld	W	D	L	GF	GA	GD	Pts
1	Académica do Porto Novo	6	3	2	1	12	7	+5	11
2	Onze Unidos	6	3	2	1	9	5	+3	11
3	FC Derby	6	3	1	2	7	5	+2	10

== Results ==
Week 1
Home	Score	Visitor	Venue	Date	Time
Onze Unidos	2 - 1	Ultramarina	20 de Janeiro	13 May	16:00
AJAC da Calheta	2 - 3	Vulcânicos	Calheta	31 May (Note: Originally for May 13)	16:00
Paulense	0 - 1	Mindelense	João Serra	14 May	16:00
Académica Porto Novo	1 - 1	Académico Aeroporto	Porto Novo	13 May	16:00
Derby	0 - 1	Sporting Praia	Adérito Sena	13 May	16:00
Sal Rei	0 - 1	Sporting Brava	Arsénio Ramos	13 May	16:00
Week 2
Home	Score	Visitor	Venue	Date	Time
Ultramarina	2 - 0	AJAC da Calheta	Orlando Rodrigues	20 May	16:00
Vulcânicos	0 - 1	Onze Unidos	5 de Julho	20 May	16:00
Mindelense	2 - 1	Académica Porto Novo	Adérito Sena	20 May	16:00
Académico Aeroporto	1 - 1	Paulense	Marcelo Leitão	20 May	17:00
Sporting Praia	3 - 0	Sal Rei	Várzea	20 May	16:00
Sporting Brava	2 - 1	Derby	Aquiles de Oliveira	21 May	16:00
Week 3
Home	Score	Visitor	Venue	Date	Time
Onze Unidos	1 - 1	AJAC da Calheta	20 de Janeiro	27 May	16:00
Ultramarina	2 - 2	Vulcânicos	Orlando Rodrigues	27 May	16:00
Paulense	2 - 2	Académica Porto Novo	João Serra	27 May	16:00
Mindelense	2 - 0	Académico Aeroporto	Adérito Sena	27 May	16:00
Derby	1 - 0	Sal Rei	Adérito Sena	28 May	16:00
Sporting Praia	1 - 0	Sporting Brava	Várzea	27 May	16:00
Week 4
Home	Score	Visitor	Venue	Date	Time
Ultramarina	2 - 1	Onze Unidos	Orlando Rodrigues	4 June	16:00
Vulcânicos	1 - 2	AJAC da Calheta	5 de Julho	4 June	16:00
Mindelense	0 - 0	Paulense	Adérito Sena	3 June	16:00
Académico Aeroporto	1 - 3	Académica Porto Novo	Porto Novo	3 June	16:00
Sporting Praia	1 - 1	Derby	Várzea	3 June	16:00
Sporting Brava	2 - 1	Sal Rei	Aquiles de Oliveira	4 June	16:00
Week 5
Home	Score	Visitor	Venue	Date	Time
AJAC da Calheta	0 - 2	Ultramarina	Calheta	11 June	16:00
Onze Unidos	2 - 0	Vulcânicos	20 de Janeiro	11 June	16:00
Académica Porto Novo	2 - 1	Mindelense	Porto Novo	11 June	16:00
Paulense	1 - 3	Académico Aeroporto	João Serra	11 June	16:00
Sal Rei	0 - 2	Sporting Praia	Arsénio Ramos	11 June	16:00
Derby	2 - 1	Sporting Brava	Adérito Sena	11 June	16:00
Week 6
Home	Score	Visitor	Venue	Date	Time
AJAC da Calheta	2 - 2	Onze Unidos	Calheta	18 June	16:00
Vulcânicos	1 - 2	Ultramarina	5 de Julho	18 June	16:00
Académica Porto Novo	3 - 0	Paulense	Porto Novo	18 June	16:00
Académico Aeroporto	0 - 2	Mindelense	Marcelo Leitão	18 June	16:00
Sal Rei	0 - 2	Derby	Arsénio Ramos	18 June	16:00
Sporting Brava	0 - 0	Sporting Praia	Aquiles de Oliveira	18 June	16:00

== Final stages ==
Semi-Finals				Finals
CS Mindelense			0
FC Ultramarina Tarrafal (São Nicolau)	0	2	2	Ultramarina Tarrafal (São Nicolau)	1	2	3
Sporting Praia	1	1	2	Sporting Clube da Praia	2	3	5
Académica do Porto Novo	1	0	1

=== Semi-finals ===
27 June 2017
16:00 (CVT, UTC-1)

FC Ultramarina	3-0 (Note: Not a single match was played, even that it was rescheduled later, Mindelense originally awarded 0-3, after they were disqualified, Ultramarina was awarded 3-0)	CS Mindelense

Estádio Orlando Rodrigues,
Tarrafal de São Nicolau
Referee: Lenine Rocha
24 June 2017
16:00 (CVT)

Académica do Porto Novo	1-1	Sporting Clube da Praia
Pagui 81'		Tae 84'

Estádio Municipal
Porto Novo
Referee: Anacleto do Rosario
2 July 2017
15:30 (CVT)

CS Mindelense	0-2 (Note: Result mostly annulled after Mindelense was suspended)	Ultramarina Tarrafal (São Nicolau)
		Patchik 13'; Djassa 45+2'

Estádio Municipal Adérito Sena
Mindelo
Referee: Manuel Timas
1 July 2017
15:30 (CVT)

Sporting Clube da Praia	1-0	Académica do Porto Novo
Blessed Teixeira 22'

Estádio da Várzea
Praia

=== Finals ===
20 August 2017 (Note: Originally for July 9)
16:00 (CVT, UTC-1)

FC Ultramarina Tarrafal (São Nicolau)	1-2	Sporting Clube da Praia
Patchico 89 (pen)'		Blessed; Panduru

Estádio Orlando Rodrigues
Tarrafal de São Nicolau
Referee: António Rodrigues
27 August 2017 (Note: Originally for July 15)

Sporting Clube da Praia	3-2	FC Ultramarina (São Nicolau)
Nido 10'; Sunday 67', 70'		Adyr 55'; Augusto 72'

Estádio da Várzea,
Praia
Referee: Lenine Rocha

Cape Verdean Football 2017
Champions
Sporting Clube da Praia
10th title

== Statistics ==
- Highest scoring match: several with 3 goals

== See also ==
- 2016–17 in Cape Verdean football
