= CD Onze Unidos =

Football club in Cape Verde

Onze Unidos
- Full name: Clube Desportivo Onze Unidos
- Founded: 1976
- Ground: Estádio 20 de Janeiro; Vila do Maio, Cape Verde
- Chairman: Edson Alves
- Manager: Djo Mariana
- League: Maio Island League
- 2016–17: 1st, Champion
Home colours	Away colours

Clube Desportivo Onze Unidos (Portuguese for "Eleven United", Capeverdean Crioulo, ALUPEC or ALUPEK: Unzi Unidus) is a football club that had played in the Premier division and plays in the Maio Island League in Cape Verde. It is based in the island of Maio Island. Since the implementation of the Second Division in 2015, Onze Unidos are one of five unrelegated clubs of Maio.

Onze Unidos is one of the most successful football (soccer) club in Cape Verde and is Maio's most successful club, having won about 20 official titles, 2 are national and the remaining 18 are regional titles.

== History ==
The club was founded after independence in 1976. The club celebrated its 10th anniversary in 1986.

It became a registered club before 1990 and competed in its first regional championships in the early 1990s.

Since 1992, the club has the most number of regional titles ahead of Académico 83, from 1995 to 1996, the club was tied with the most number of regional titles.

The team has only reached a few of these games after independence. The team won one national title in 2001 and is the only club from Maio to win a single national title. The club also won ten island titles, the team also won one national cup, three island cups and has two island super cups, each after defeating Académico 83.

In 2001, Onze Unidos celebrated its 25th anniversary. In the 2001 season, Onze Unidos is the only club from Maio to win a national championship title and from 2012, the national honour with the cup. Onze Unidos finished with 14 points, a club record that stood for just a season before Sporting Praia and Batuque took it, also in the same season, SC Atlético, Académica do Fogo and Académico do Aeroporto superseded Onze Unidos' points total with 16. Onze Unidos also had four wins, two draws and eight goals scored, mid ranked.

On May 1, 2013, Onze Unidos as the 2012 cup winner went to challenge with the 2012 champion Sporting Praia in the Cape Verdean Super Cup played in São Filipe in Fogo. The match went into extra time and no goals were scored, they kept their final luck to get a super cup title which was completely ran out as they lost the penalty shootout to Sporting Praia. So far, Onze Unidos is the only of the three participants in the nation without any super cup title.

In the 2013–14 and the 2015 seasons, the club had the same results including wins and goals scored, but Onze Unidos conceded 15 goals in 2015, two more than in 2014. In 2015, Onze Unidos won their second cup title and their totals were shared with the island's two Académica affiliates, the latter of Calheta. Recently, the club qualified as a second place cup winner to the Maio Super Cup, the club lost to Académico 83 on November 13, 2016.

The 2016–17 Regional Championships begin (second time as the Maio Premier Division) and Onze Unidos took the number one spot and kept it up to the fourth round on February 4, Académica da Calheta stole it in the fifth round, Onze Unidos brought it back at the sixth round and kept it for the rest of the season and became regional championships for the twelfth time after their 5–0 victory over Real Maritimo, a club who just spent their first and only season in the Premier Division. The result was also that became the region's highest. Onze Unidos had six points more than second placed Barreirense. The last match of the season was a goal draw with Académico 83 on April 23 and the point difference with Barreirense fell to four, the club finished with 26 points and had the same wins (4) and goals (23) as last season, the club had four draws and fewer goals conceded numbering six. In the 2017 National Champs, the new three group system was featured and Group A Onze Unidos participated, three wins and two draws the club made and finished with 11 points, it became their second highest at the national championships behind their 2001 total and ahead of their 2005 total. Onze Unidos finished second in Group A, as they were second in the second-place ranking, they were thrown out from further competition in the playoff (or knockout) stage.

On the first 2016–17 Maio Cup match on November 27, the club was playing in Group B and the club defeated Santa Clara 10–0, a club who already played their first season at the regionals, the result was one of the highest for the club and the highest of any of the regional cup matches. The club recently made it to the finals and on April 29, they played with Santana de Morrinho in the cup final, the match went into a scoreless draw, Onze Unidos defeated Santana 4–3 in the penalty shootouts and won their third back to back cup title. Onze Unidos' cup totals became the most again shared with Académico 83.

Onze Unidos was participant in the regional super cup later in the year as champions. On October 28, they played with Santana and the match was 1–1 at the 85th minute, lights were poorly light and the match was stopped and later abandoned. Onze Unidos was the fourth participant for the 2017 Champions' Cup (or Trophy) and entered as Premier Division champion, they faced champion of the Second Division. The club started off the 2017–18 season, the first extended season with additional two matches, they lost to Académica da Calheta in the first round, the last match of 2017 which was on December 23, a 3–0 win over Marítimo Cascabulho, then a two-goal draw with Santana was made which was the first match of 2018, then, a loss to a newcomer Miramar, a scoreless draw with their rival Académico 83 was made, the club defeated Morrerense 0–2 on January 27 prevented that club from having 16 points. Onze Unidos was fifth place with 8 points. The 7th round match with Barreirense had the club fielding an ineligible player, after the start of March, the match was awarded to Barreirense. Another loss was followed after their cup break on February 18 to Académica da Calheta was next, followed by a win over Marítimo 1–4 and was fifth with 11 points. Onze Unidos defeated Santana 1–2 and was third with 14 points. Onze Unidos made a 4–1 win over Miramar and has 17 points, Barreirense's (with 28 points) win over Santana made Onze Unidos completely lost a chance for another regional title, with it, their national participation. Up next was the Maio Rivalry where they defeated Académico 83 3–2 and had 20 points. Next was a 4–1 win over Morrerense and had 23 points, a number they would finish, the championship last match, a 2–1 loss to Barreirense and finished third. They also scored 25 goals sharing with Morrerense.

In the cup semis, they defeated Marítimo 3–0 and again played in the cup final on April 4, this time with Barreirense. With Barreirense winning the championship title, Onze Unidos achieved qualification into the super cupt. Onze Unidos defeated Barreirense 2–0 and won another cup title totaling four and is now the club with the most cup titles on the island, Onze Unidos will qualify as cup winner into the super cup.

== Honours ==
- Cape Verdean Championship: 1

2001

- Cape Verdean Cup: 1

2012

- Maio Island League: 12

1992, 1995, 1995/96, 1998/99, 2000/01, 2001/02, 2002/03, 2003/04, 2004/05, 2008/09, 2010/11, 2016–17

- Maio Cup (Taça da Djarmai): 4

2011/12, 2014/15, 2016/17, 2017–18

- Maio Super Cup (Taça da Djarmai): 1

2014/15

- Maio Champion's Cup: 1

2016/17

== League and cup history ==
=== National level ===
Season	Div.	Pos.	Pl.	W	D	L	GS	GA	GD	P	Cup	Notes	Playoffs
1999	1B	3	2	0	1	1	1	4	-3	1		Did not advance	Did not participate
2001	1	1	6	4	2	0	8	3	+5	14			
2002	1	8	8	0	2	6	5	17	-12	2			
2003	1A	4	4	1	1	2	4	6	-2	4		Did not advance	Did not participate
2004	1B	3	4	2	1	1	5	3	+2	7		Did not advance	Did not participate
2005	1B	3	5	3	0	2	11	7	+4	9		Did not advance	Did not participate
2009	1A	4	5	2	1	2	5	5	0	7		Did not advance	Did not participate
2011	1A	4	4	1	0	3	4	9	-5	3		Did not advance	Did not participate
2012	Did not participate										Winner		Did not participate
2017	1A	2-U	6	3	2	1	9	5	+3	11	Not held	Did not advance	Did not participate

2-U: A club who finished second and in the second place ranking, ranked as a non-participant in the playoff stage which the club has been eliminated from

=== Island/Regional championship ===
Season	Div.	Pos.	Pl.	W	D	L	GS	GA	GD	P	Cup	Opening	Notes
2004–05	2	1	-	-	-	-	-	-	-	-			Promoted into the National Championships
2008–09	2	1	-	-	-	-	-	-	-	-			Promoted into the National Championships
2010–11	2	1	-	-	-	-	-	-	-	-			Promoted into the National Championships
2013–14	2	3	8	4	0	4	15	13	+2	12			
2014–15	2	3	8	4	0	4	15	15	0	12	Winner		
2015–16	2	3	12	7	2	3	23	13	+10	23		Not held	
2016–17	2	1	12	7	4	1	23	6	+7	25	Winner	Not held	Promoted into the National Championships
2017–18	2	3	14	7	2	5	25	17	+8	23		Not held	

== Statistics ==
- Best position: 1st (national)
- Best position at a cup competition: 1st, winner (national)
- Appearances at the championships:
  - National: 9
  - Regional: 18
- Appearances at cup competitions:
    - National: Once
    - Regional: 8
- Appearances at a regional super cup competition: 3
- Highest number of goals scored in a season: 11 (national), in 2005
- Highest number of points in a season: 14 (national), in 2001
- Highest number of wins in a season: 4 (national), in 2001
- Highest scoring match:
  - National Championships: Onze Unidos 5–1 Estância Baixo, 21 May 2005
  - Regional Cup: Onze Unidos 10–0 Santa Clara, November 2, 2016
- Lowest number of goals scored in a season: 1 (national), in 1999
- Lowest number of points in a season: 1 (national), in 1999
- Highest number of goals conceded in a season: 17 (national), in 2002
- Highest number of matches lost in a season: 6 (national), in 2015
