= Maio Island Super Cup =

Maio Super Cup
- Founded: 2008
- Region: Maio, Cape Verde
- Current champions: None
- Most championships: Académico 83

The Maio Super Cup (Capeverdean Creole: Super Taça de Djarmai) is a regional super cup competition played during the season in Maio Island, Cape Verde. The competition is organized by the Maio Regional Football Association (Associação Regional do Maio de Futebol, ARMF). Its current champions is Académico 83 do Porto Inglês. The regional champion competes with the cup champion. If a champion also has a cup title, a cup club who is runner-up qualifies. The 2018 season will feature the champion Barreirense and Onze Unidos, without a status until the April 7 cup final.

The first edition took place in 2008.

== Winners ==
Season	Winner	Runner-up
2008-09	Unknown	
2009/10	Barreirense FC	Morrerense
2010-11	Onze Unidos	Académico 83
2011-12	Unknown (Note: The super cup edition featured the champion Académico 83 do Porto Inglês and the cup winner Onze Unidos)	
2012/13	Académico 83	Beira Mar do Maio
2013/14	Académico 83^{1}	Académica da Calheta
2014/15	Onze Unidos	Académico 83
2015/16	Académico 83	Onze Unidos^{1}
2016/17	No winner (Note: The super cup match between Onze Unidos (champion, also cup winner) and Santana (runner up in the cup competition) was played, it finished at 1-1 and the match was abandoned at the 85th minute due to poor lighting in the stadium)	

^{1}Runner up in the cup final as the regional cup winner was also the regional champion that season

=== Performance By Club ===
Club	Winners	Winning years
Académico 83	3 listed	2013, 2014, 2016
Onze Unidos	2/3	2011, 2015
Barreirense	1	2010

== See also ==
- Maio Island Cup
- Maio Premier Division
- Maio Opening Tournament
