= Barreirense FC =

Multi-sports club in Cape Verde

Barreirense
- Founded: 18 October 1977; 48 years ago
- Ground: Barreiro, Cape Verde and Cidade do Maio; Maio Island, Cape Verde
- League: Maio Island League
- 2014–15: Did not participate
- Website: www.barreirensefc.com
Home colours

Barreirense Futebol Clube (Capeverdean Crioulo, ALUPEC or ALUPEK: Barrerensi) is a sports club in Maio Island, Cape Verde, based in the village of Barreiro in the south of the island, that mainly plays in the stadium in the southeast of Cidade do Maio. Barreirense is the third most successful football (soccer) club on Maio having won about 5 official regional titles. Since the implementation of the Second Division in 2015, Barreirense are now the five unrelegated clubs of the island.

== History ==
The club was founded on 18 October 1977, not long after the nation's independence. Their first title was an opening tournament title won in 2001. Barreirense celebrated its 25th anniversary of its foundation in 2002. Five years later, the team claimed their first championship title in history since independence in 2006 and advanced to the national division for the first time. They would receive a single win and two points and would be their career total for the whole league, they would be sixth in Group B. Along with Beira-Mar, they were last in title totals until 2010, that was also shared with Académica Calheta until 2009. They won their second title in 2010 and participated again in the same group and was placed sixth again, this time without a win or goal like their last appearance. Their title possession totals were shared as third with Académica Calheta until 2014, afterwards, Barreirense held the fourth most. Later, Barreirense won a cup title in 2010 and qualified into the 2010 Cape Verdean National Cup. Barreirense won their only super cup title for Maio in late 2010.

Until 2014, the club's area included the whole of the southeast of the island which included the villages of Alcatraz, Figueira da Horta, Pilão Cão and Ribeira Dom João. Figueira da Horta would have Figueriense and Ribeira Dom João would have Miramar. In 2016, Alcatraz and Pilão Cao would have Santa Clara. The club's area is the area within Barreiro.

Recently the club has not appeared in the island championships and has been absent even in the 2013–14 and the 2014–15 season. The club finally returned during the 2015–16 season and Barrerense finished 6th ahead of Beira-Mar with 7 points, two wins and 15 goals scored.

In the 2017–18 regional cup, they are currently first in Group B, the club has scored 11 goals, overall 14 less than Group A's Académico 83. The club started off the 2017–18 Premier Division season good, the club was ranked second alongside Morrerense with four points, a win and a draw and two goals scored, this was actually incorrect, in mid-January, Barreirense was in trouble when the regional federation found out that the club fielded an ineligible player in a match with Morrerense and the match was awarded against. Barreirense's actual position became from mid to last. Barreirense recently had a 6–2 win over Santana and made it the highest scoring match in the region, on 9 February, the third round match with Miramar was played and ended in a scoreless draw. On 28 January, Barreirense defeated Maio's one of top two clubs Académico 83 with the score 3–2. At round 6, they became officially second. The 7th round match originally had Barreirense lost 2–1, after the start of March, the regional football association awarded Barrerense 0–3 as Onze Unidos fielded an eligible player. After the cup break, Barreirense made three more wins, the first with 6–1 over Marítimo de Cascabulho. Barreirense was first ahead of Académico 83 with 22 points at the 10th round and had 25 points at the 11th round after their win over Miramar, they had two points more than Académico 83. Barreirense recently defeated Santana, then Académica Calheta do Maio and still first with 31 points, what gained will be another regional title and a national participation and they finally got it after a 2–1 win over Onze Unidos, they finished with a new club record of 34 points, also they had 11 wins. In goal scoring, they scored 35, second behind Académico 83 and ahead of Onze Unidos and Morrerense with 25. Also Barreirense's three championship titles once again shared with Académica da Calheta as the third most on the island. Also Barrereirense will qualify into the upcoming regional super cup later (since 4 April, only as champions) in the season along with the Champion's Cup with second division champion Figueirense.

In the cup semis, they defeated the powerful Académico 83 and became participant in the upcoming cup final played on 4 April with Onze Unidos, Barreirense completely lost the title after losing 2–0.

In April 2018, Barreirense got their next national championship appearance in nearly eight years and play in Group C, their only time in a three group system which was introduced in the 2017 season. At the end of April, Barreirense is currently third place in Group C ahead of Sporting Praia. Also Barreirense currently has four points which became a club record.

== Logo ==
Its logo colors are red and white, it has a large white star with a small black star inside. In five parts outside the edges of the star has three red stripes and two white stripes. It has a thin black rim, outside it is the acronym on top and the village where it is based on bottom.

== Uniform ==
Its uniform colors are red and white, later uniforms also used black.

== Honours ==
- Maio Island League/Premier Division: 3

2005/06, 2009/10, 2017/18

- Maio Island Cup: 1

2009/10

- Maio Super Cup: 1

2009/10

- Maio Island Opening Tournament: 1

2000/01

== League and cup history ==
=== National level ===
Season	Div.	Pos.	Pl.	W	D	L	GS	GA	GD	P	Cup	Notes	Playoffs
2006	1B	6	5	1	0	4	4	13	-9	2		Did not advance	Did not participated
2010	1B	6	5	0	0	5	5	12	-7	0		Did not advance	Did not participated
2018	1C	4	6	1	3	2	7	8	-1	6		Did not advance	Did not participate
Total:			16	2	3	11	15	33	-18	8			

=== Island/Regional championship ===
Season	Div.	Pos.	Pl.	W	D	L	GS	GA	GD	P	Cup	Opening	Notes
2005–06	2	1	-	-	-	-	-	-	-	-			Promoted into the National Championships
2009–10	2	1	-	-	-	-	-	-	-	-			Promoted into the National Championships
2015–16	2	6	12	2	1	9	15	36	-21	7			
2016–17	2	2	12	6	3	3	19	11	+8	21		Not held	
2017–18	2	1	14	11	1	2	35	14	+21	34	Finalist	Not held	Promoted into the National Championships

== Statistics ==
- Best position: 4th – group stage
- Best position at cup competitions: Qualifying round (national)
- Best position at an opening tournament: 1st
- Best season 2018 (1 win, 3 draws, 7 goals, 6 points)
- Appearance at the Cape Verdean Cup: Once, in 2010
- Appearance at a regional Super Cup: Once, in 2010
- Total wins: 2 (national)
- Total draws: 3 (national)
- Total goals scored: 15 (national)
- Total points: 8 (national)
- Total matches played: 16 (national)
- Highest number of points in a season: 6 (national), in 2018
- Highest number of wins in a season: 1 (national)
- Highest number of goals in a season: 7 (national), in 2018
- Highest scoring match: Barreirense 3 – 4 Académico do Aeroporto 4, 15 May 2010
- Lowest number of goals scored in a season: 4 (national), in 2006
- Lowest number of points in a season: none (national), in 2010
- Highest number of losses in a season: 5 (national), in 2010
- Highest number of goals conceded in a season: 13 (national), in 2006
- Worst defeat: Académico do Aeroporto 6 – 1 Barreirense, 21 May 2006
- Worst season: 2010 (5 losses)
- Total losses: 11 (national)
- Total goals conceded: 33 (national)

== Other sports ==
Apart from association football there are also in the club volleyball and athletics departments.
