= Maio Island Cup =

- Founded: 2007
- Region: MaioIsland, Cape Verde
- Teams: 12
- Current champions: Onze Unidos (4th time)
- Most championships: Onze Unidos (4 titles)

The Maio Island Cup (Portuguese: Taça (Copa) da Ilha do Maio, Capeverdean Crioulo, ALUPEC or ALUPEK: Tasa da Idja du Maio or Tasa da Djarmaiu, Maio Creole: Taça d' Djarmai) is a regional cup competition and is played during the season in the island of Maio, Cape Verde, it consists of all the clubs from all the two regional divisions and are divided into about three rounds, for some seasons, a group stage was featured. The cup competition is organized by the Maio Regional Football Association (Associação Regional do Maio, ARFM). The cup winner competes in the regional super cup final in the following season when a cup winner also wins the championship, a runner-up competes. For several seasons, the winner qualified into Cape Verdean Cup which has been cancelled due to financial and scheduling reasons.

Its current cup winner is Onze Unidos who recently won two straight titles.

Up to 2014, it had seven clubs, for some seasons, five were active, the additional four made it to 11 in 2016 and the addition of Santa Clara in 2017 would it had it to 12, the withdrawal of Beira-Mar kept it at 11. It finally had 12 clubs for the 2017–18 season, the season also had started from group stage, divided into two groups and a club had one meeting, the top two advanced into the semis.

== Winners ==
Season	Winner	Score	Runner-up
2006/07	Académica da Calheta		
2008-09	Not held		
2009/10	Barreirense FC		
2010-11	Académico 83		
2011-12	Onze Unidos		
2012/13	Académico 83	3–1	Beira-Mar do Maio
2013/14	Académica da Calheta		
2014/15	Onze Unidos		
2015/16	Académico 83		
2016-17	Onze Unidos	0–0 (4–3 p)	Santana de Morrinho
2017-18	Onze Unidos	2–0	Barreirense

=== Performance By Club ===
Club	Winners	Winning years
Onze Unidos	4	2012, 2015, 2017, 2018
Académico 83	3	2011, 2013, 2016
Académica da Calheta	2	2007, 2014
Barreirense	1	2010

=== Performance by area ===
Settlement or town	Area	Winning years
Cidade do Maio	7	2011, 2012, 2013, 2015, 2016, 2017, 2018
Calheta do Maio	2	2007, 2014
Barreiro	1	2010

== See also ==
- Maio Premier Division
- Maio Second Division
- Maio Super Cup
- Maio Opening Tournament
- Maio Champion's Cup
