= Académica da Calheta do Maio =

Académica da Calheta Akadémica da Kadjeta
- Full name: Associação Académica da Calheta do Maio
- Founded: 1979
- Ground: Calheta, Maio Island, Cape Verde
- League: Maio Island League
- 2016–17: 4th
Home colours	Away colours

Associação Académica da Calheta do Maio (Capeverdean Crioulo, ALUPEC or ALUPEK: Akadémika da Kadjeta, São Vicente Crioulo: Akadémica d' Kalheta) is a football club that plays in the Maio Island League in Cape Verde. They have a football field in Calheta and their matches are played at Estádio 20 de Janeiro in the island capital Cidade do Maio. Since the implementation of the Second Division in 2015, Académica Calheta is now among the five unrelegated clubs of the island.

The logo and the uniform as well as other teams with the name Académica and Académico in Cape Verde is identical to Académica de Coimbra. It is the only island in Cape Verde that has two clubs affiliated to Académica, the other is Académico 83 in Cidade do Maio.

== History ==
The club was founded in 1979 and became registered in the 1980s. Their first title in history since independence was claimed in 2007 and became the latest team that advanced to the national division for the first time, a total of three regional titles have won by the club with their last won in 2014. The club is third in title totals which was the region's last as it was the region's fifth and recent club to win a championship title. From 2008, the sole club that had the third most except from spring 2010 to 2014 which was shared with Barreirense. Académica Calheta do Maio won their only two titles apart from the championship, the regional cup won in 2007 and in 2014, their cup totals at the time the most on the island until 2016, it was shared with Académico 83 and from 2015 for a season with Onze Unidos. As the club were both champions and cup winners, the club qualified into the 2014 Super Cup as runner up and lost the title to Académico 83.

In the 2013–14 season, the club defeated Onze Unidos 0–2 and was second placed for the next four rounds, no lower they would be placed. Their second match which was at round 3 was a loss to Académico 83, then the rest of the matches ended in victories, first place they were at the fifth and sixth rounds, they were second during their last bye week, first place the club was for the rest of the season and was champions for the last time for Académica da Calheta.

In 2015, they finished fourth, the club was runner-up in the Premier Division in 2016. Also in 2016, Académica Calheta's two cup totals became second alongside Onze Unidos behind Académico 83 in 2017, Académica da Calheta finished fourth behind Académico 83, another affiliate based in Cidade do Maio. The club had a win more but two draws, three less, both had 17 goals scored but Académica Calheta do Maio conceded 13 goals, four more than the other. Of the goals scored which was third, it was shared with Académico 83 and Morrerense. In Spring 2017, the club's two cup total became third behind Académico 83 and Onze Unidos' three titles and ahead of Barreirense's single total.

Académica started the 2017–18 season with a win over Onze Unidos, their successes were not good and at round 7, their position fell to last place until another win over Onze Unidos was made on 18 February, then a win over Santana and escaped last place which is the relegation zone and was 6th, continues at round 10. At the 6th round, Académica Calheta alongside Marítimo and Santana had a win and a draw and four losses, they had four goals scored, the regions fewest and 8 goals conceded. Académica recently made two straight wins before a four-goal draw with Morrerense on 4 March, Académica da Calheta recently suffered a loss to Onze Unidos, they have 11 points and 12 goals scored, shared as last in the region alongside Santana and Marítimo. Académica lost to Barreirense on 18 March and has the fewest goals scored in the region. They remain above the relegation zone as they have equal points with Marítimo.

== Rivalry ==
The club's only rival is Académico 83 forming the Académica Derby of Maio.

== Honours ==
- Maio Island League: 3

2006/07, 2007/08, 2013/14

- Maio Island Cup: 2

2006/07, 2013/14

== League and cup history ==
=== National championship ===
Season	Div.	Pos.	Pl.	W	D	L	GS	GA	GD	P	Cup	Notes	Playoffs
2007	1A	6	5	0	2	3	3	13	-10	2		Did not advance	Did not participate
2008	1B	3	5	2	2	1	8	8	0	8		Did not advance	Did not participate
2014	1B	4	5	2	0	3	5	8	-3	6		Did not advance	Did not participate
Total:			15	4	4	7	16	29	-13	16			

=== Island/Regional Championship ===
Season	Div.	Pos.	Pl.	W	D	L	GS	GA	GD	P	Cup	Tour	Notes
2006–07	2	1	12	-	-	-	-	-	-	-			Promoted into the National Championships
2008–09	2	1	12	-	-	-	-	-	-	-			Promoted into the National Championships
2013–14	2	1	8	7	0	1	29	5	+24	21			Promoted into the National Championships
2014–15	2	4	8	2	2	4	11	19	-8	7	Finalist		
2015–16	2	2	12	8	1	3	27	9	+18	25			
2016–17	2	4	12	6	2	4	17	13	+4	20			

== Statistics ==
- Best position: 3rd – Group B (national)
- Best position at a cup competition: Finalist (regional)
- Appearances at the National Championships: 3 (national)
- Appearances at the regional cup competitions: 8
- Total matches played: 14 (national)
  - Total matches played at home: 7 (national)
  - Total matches played away: 7 (national)
- Total wins: 4 (national)
  - Total wins at home: 2 (national)
  - Total wins away: 2 (national)
- Total draws: 4 (national)
  - Total draws at home: 1 (national)
  - Total draws away: 3 (national – 2 played, 1 awarded)
- Total goals scored: 16 (national)
- Total points: 16 (national)
- Highest number of goals scored in a season: 8 (national), in 2008
- Highest number of points in a season: 8 (national), in 2003
- Highest number of wins in a season: 2 (national)
- Highest scoring matches at the National Championships: 3 with three goals
  - Bairro 3–3 Académica Calheta, 5 June 2008
  - Fiorentina 2–3 Académica Calheta, 24 May 2008
- Lowest number of goals scored in a season: 3 (national), in 2007
- Lowest number of points in a season: 2 (national), in 2007
- Highest number of goals conceded in a season: 13 (national), 2007
- Highest number of matches lost in a season: 3 (national)
- Total losses: 7 (national)
- Total goals conceded: 29 (national)
- Total goal difference: 13 (national)
- Worst defeat: Sporting 5–0 Académica Calheta, 5 May 2007
