= Académico 83 do Porto Inglês =

Football club in Cape Verde

Académico 83
- Full name: Associação Académico 83 do Porto Inglês
- Nicknames: Académico 83, Académico, Micá, Mico, Mico 83
- Founded: July 6, 1983
- Ground: Estádio Municipal do Porto Inglês, Porto Inglês – Maio, Cape Verde
- Capacity: 4,000
- President: Edvaldo Soares
- Manager: Fernando Graça
- League: Maio Island League (Associação Regional de Futebol do Maio (ARFM))
- 2016–17: 3rd
- Website: http://academico83.com/
Home colours	Away colours

Associação Académico 83 do Porto Inglês (Capeverdean Crioulo, ALUPEC or ALUPEK: Akadémiku 83) is a football (soccer) club that plays in the Maio Island League in Cape Verde. It is based in the city of Porto Inglês, island of Maio. Its current president is Edvaldo Soares and its coach is Nando (Fernando Graça). Since the implementation of the Second Division in 2015, Académico 83 are now the five unrelegated clubs of the island.

Académico 83 is the most successful football (soccer) club on Maio having won about 16 official regional titles, of which are nine championship titles, three cup and super cup titles and an opening tournament title. Its regional totals are now shared with Onze Unidos since April 29 after that club's cup win. It was once shared earlier with that club even in mid to late 2016.

== History ==
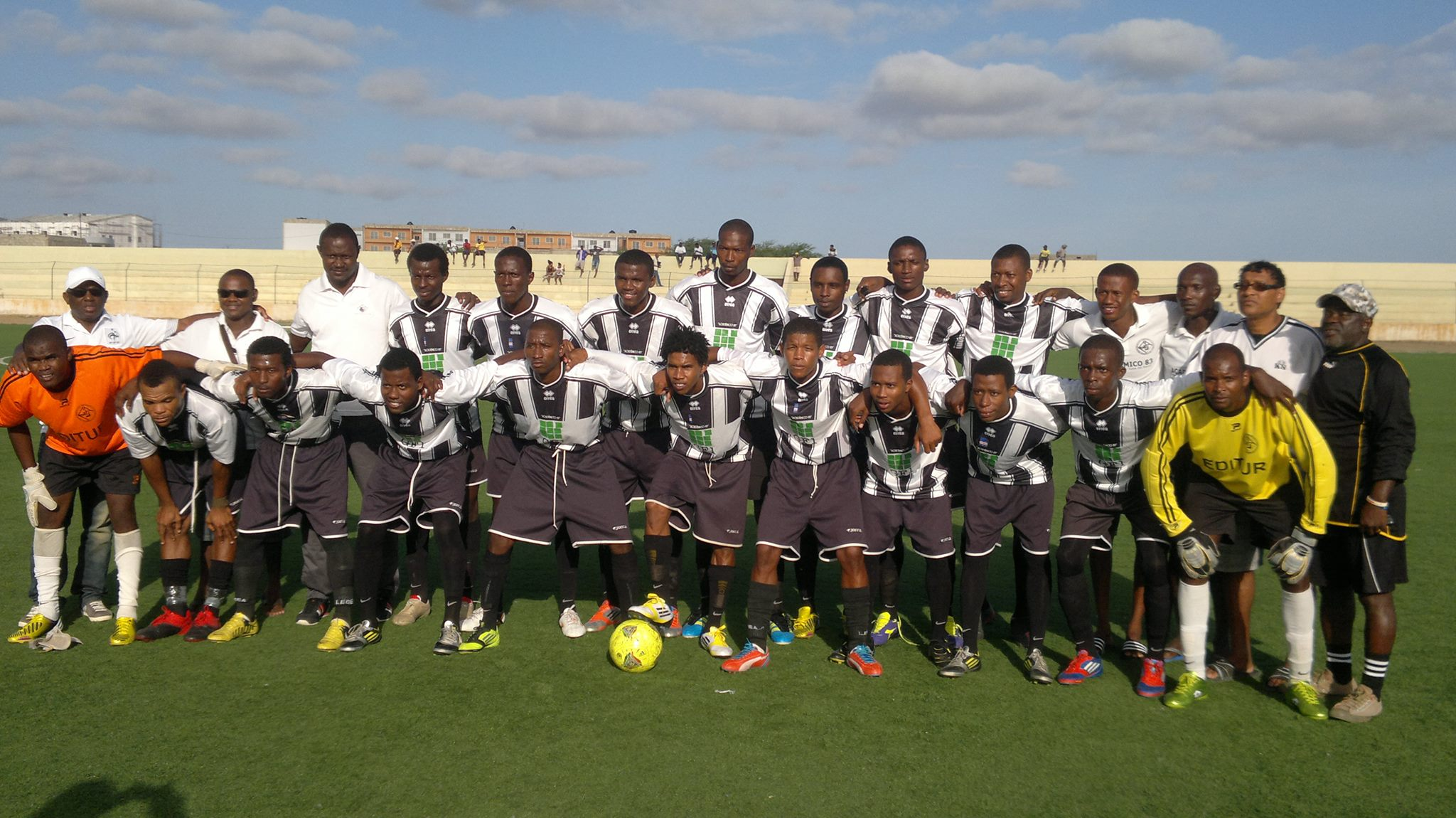
Académico 83 squad of the 2013–14 season

The team got its name by the fact of being formed by high school students in 1983. Its founders were Jacinto Spencer dos Santos, Domingos Emanuel Soares, Francisco Adriano Contina Inês, Mario Anibal Costa, Nelson dos Santos and Domingos Lopes Correia. The club is an affiliate to Académica de Coimbra in Portugal. It is one of several regional championships that has more than an affiliate of another club in Cape Verde, the other is Académica da Calheta further north on the island.

The club became a registered club in 1987. The club started to play in regional competitions in 1991 when the Maio Island League was founded and was the first club to win a regional title and was the first club from the island to compete at the national level. In 1992, its totals were shared with Onze Unidos. The club celebrated its 10th anniversary of foundation in 1993. Two consecutive titles for the club were won in 1994 and was mastery of Maio's regional title numbers for the next seven years. From 1992 to 1993 and again from 1996 to 1997, together with Onze Unidos were the island's only club who possessed championship titles, since 1997, the title totals is second on the island behind Onze Unidos. The club celebrated its 25th anniversary of foundation in 2008. Later, the club also won two consecutive titles in 2013 and two consecutive titles in 2016. Also, twice that the club won all four different regional competitions in 2013 and three in 2016. In regional cup totals, Académico 83 was the island's only club to possess more than a title until 2014 when they were shared with Académica da Calheta, for a season from 2015, it was shared with Onze Unidos.

In the 2013–14 season, the club won the first three matches before suffering their first seasonal loss to Onze Unidos on 2 February and lost the number one spot. Académico 83 defeated Académica da Calheta, at the 7th round, they made a draw with Beira-Mar, that time, the club got the final chanced to become champion, it was finally dissolved after a loss to Académica da Calheta on 23 February, the season's final match was a victory over Onze Unidos 2–1 and finished runner up to another Académica affiliate from Calheta up north.

The club also organized once the tournament of Académicas of Cape Verde won by Académica of Fogo.

Académico 83 was not as successful as last season, the 2016–17 season had a moderate success, they started fifth, their first match was a loss to Morrerense 2–1 on January 14. A win over Académica Calheta put their position to fourth, on February 26 a draw with Onze Unidos put the club to fifth, a win over Real Marítimo at the 9th round put the club to second. A bye week at the 11th round would formally put the club to third for the rest of the season, the last two matches of the season ended in draws, first with nothing scored with Académica da Calheta, then a goal draw with Onze Unidos on April 23. The club finished third with 20 points, Académica Calheta also shared the points total, Académico 83 conceded nine goals, four less than Académica Calheta. The club scored 17 goals, nearly half than last season, it was ranked third and was one of three clubs who scored that many. Also at the Maio Cup, in one of the competition, the club was kicked out from further competition after they lost to Onze Unidos in the penalty shootouts 4–3 as the match ended in a scoreless draw. From spring 2016 to 2017, the club has the most cup titles, first solely then the club now shares with the most regional cup titles with Onze Unidos.

In the 2017–18 Maio Cup, Académico 83 started first in Group A. Their first match was an 8–1 win over Figueirense which is the highest scoring match in the cup for the season. Two more successful victories were followed, a 7–0 win over Santa Clara and then an 8–1 win over Cruzeiro and had a goal total of 25 of any in the regional cup, 14 more than Barreirense, first in Group B. Académico 83 had all five wins in group stage and qualifies later in the season alongside second placed Real Marítimo. In the 2017–18 Championships, the club started first place and was their position at the fourth round, the points were shared with Morrerense, the club has 11 goals scored, two more than Morrerense. Académico 83 lost to Barreirense 3–2 on January 28, the result was unexpected to the island's major two clubs, the club was third place with 6 rounds played. Académica 83 defeated Académica Calheta at round 7 and made two more wins with their last, a 1–6 win over Miramar and was second place with 20 points (originally first as Onze Unidos fielded an eligible player in their 7th round match with Barreirense) two less than Barreirense. At the regional cup semis, they lost 1–2 to Onze Unidos and was out from further competition. Back in the championships, they made their recent win over Marítimo and has 23 points. On March 11, a huge result where they defeated Morrerense 10–1 and became mastery of goal scoring on the island, at 35, but the club was second place with 26 points behind Barreirense. The Maio Rivalry came with a 3–2 loss and remains second, five less points than Barreirense as they remain to have a chance for another regional championship title.

== Rivalry ==
The club's main rivalry is Onze Unidos forming the Cidade do Maio rivalry, the club's least rivalry is Académica da Calheta do Maio forming the Académica derby of Maio.

== Stadium ==
The club plays at Estádio 20 de Janeiro, also known as Estádio Municipal do Maio, Onze Unidos, and clubs from other parts of the island play at the stadium.

== Logo and uniform ==
Its logo color is black based on Academica Coimbra's logo but with the fort on the bottom.

Its uniform color are entirely black clothing for home games and a white T-shirt with black rims one the bottom part and the remainder black for away or alternate games.

Its uniform colors up to 2016 were black with white stripes on its sleeves during home games, for away/alternate games, it was opposite with white and orange T-shirt with black stripes on its sleeves, orange socks and black shorts.

Home uniform up to 2016
Visitor's/Alternate uniform up to 2016
Third color's uniform up to 2016

== Honours ==
=== Football (soccer) ===
- Maio Island League: 9

1991, 1993, 1994, 1998, 2012, 2013, 2015, 2016, 2019

- Djarmai Cup (Maio Cup): 3

2011, 2013, 2016

- Maio Opening Tournament: 2

2013
2019

- Maio Super Cup: 4

2013, 2014, 2016, 2019

- Maio Champion's Cup: 1

2019/20

- Youth competitions: 4
  - Maio U-17: 3

2013, 2014, 2015

  - Djarmai Cup (Maio Cup) U-17: 1

2014

=== Other sports ===
- Handball:
  - Maio Island League (twice championship)

== League and cup history ==
=== National level ===
Season	Div.	Pos.	Pl.	W	D	L	GS	GA	GD	P	Cup	Notes	Playoffs
2012	1B	6	5	0	2	3	6	13	-7	2		Did not advance	Did not participate
2013	1B	5	5	0	2	3	5	11	-6	2		Did not advance	Did not participate
2015	1A	4	5	2	0	3	5	9	-4	6		Did not advance	Did not participate
2016	1A	4	5	1	2	2	5	8	-3	5		Did not advance	Did not participate

=== Island/Regional championship ===
Season	Div.	Pos.	Pl.	W	D	L	GS	GA	GD	P	Cup	Opening	Notes
2011–12	2	1	-	-	-	-	-	-	-	-	Winner		Promoted into the National Championships
2012–13	2	1	-	-	-	-	-	-	-	-	Winner	Winner	Promoted into the National Championships
2013–14	2	2	8	5	1	2	17	10	+7	16			
2014–15	2	1	8	6	1	1	20	3	+17	19			Promoted into the National Championships
2015–16	2	1	12	9	2	1	34	10	+24	29	Winner		Promoted into the National Championships
2016–17	2	3	12	5	5	2	17	9	+8	20	Semi-finalist	Not held	
2017–18	2	2	14	10	2	2	42	14	+28	32		Not held	

== Statistics ==
- Best position at a cup competition: 1st (national)
- Appearances in a regional cup competition: 8
- Appearances at regional super cup competition: 2
- Highest number of points in a season: 6 (national)
- Lowest number of points in a season: 4 (national)
- Highest number of goals conceded in a season: 13 (national)
- Highest number of matches lost in a season: 3 (national), 2011

== Current technical staff ==
Name	Role
(Cape Verde) Edvaldo Silva Soares	President
(Cape Verde) Josemar Correia Martins	Director of football
(Cape Verde) Fernando Jorge Neves da Graça	Head coach
(Cape Verde) Ruben António Ribeiro Neves	Assistant coach
(Cape Verde) Laurindo da Graça	Masseur
(Cape Verde) Alexandre Andrade	Fitness coach
(Cape Verde) Harley Jardel Fidalgo	Equipment Manager

== Current Under-17 technical staff ==
Name	Role
(Cape Verde) Edvaldo Silva Soares	President
(Cape Verde) José Luis Borges	Head coach
(Cape Verde) Anderson Luis Miranda dos Santos	Assistant coach
(Cape Verde) Já di Bilim	Goalkeeper Coach
(Cape Verde) Ronaldo Santos da Graça Araújo	Delegado
(Cape Verde) Ni di Nha Branca	Masseur

== Club officials ==
As of December 10, 2015

=== Directive Board ===
- President: Edvaldo Silva Soares
- Vice-president: Emanuel Querido
- Secretary: Dora Monteiro
- Vowels: Fernando Jorge da Graça, Braselina de Melo, Josemar Martins, Evelina Soares

=== General Assembly ===
- President: Domingos Emanuel Soares
- Vice-president: Francisco Contina Inês
- Secretary: Armandina Livramento
- Vowels: José Carlos Silva, Franklin Ribeiro dos Santos

=== Advisory Council ===
- President: Nelson dos Santos
- Vice-president: Emanuel Silva Soares
- Secretary: José Maria Lopes Moreira
- Vowels: Domingos Lopes Correia, Luis Miranda (Deceased)

== Other sports ==
=== Futsal team ===
- Considered the best team of Futsal in the past
