= Maio Premier Division =

Maio Island League
- Founded: 1987
- Region: Maio Island, Cape Verde
- Number of clubs: 7
- Promotion to: Cape Verdean Football Championship
- Relegation to: Maio Second Division
- Domestic cup(s): Maio Island Cup (Djarmai); Maio Island Super Cup (Djarmai)
- Current champions: Barreirense (5th title) (2024-25)
- Most championships: Onze Unidos (12 times)
- Website: Official website

The Maio Island League is a regional championship played in Maio Island, Cape Verde. The competition is organized by the Maio Regional Football Association (Associação Regional do Maio de Futebol, ARMF). The winner of the championship plays in Cape Verdean football Championships of each season. Since 2015, the last place club relegates and Beira-Mar was the first club to be relegated.

== About the Island/Regional League ==
The competition was founded around 1987 and was the last inhabited island without its own regional championships. They started out with six clubs, later it was increased to seven clubs which was the tenth most in the nation. From 2011 to 2015, it was shared with Brava having the second fewest clubs in Cape Verde which was also the ninth most.

For several seasons, the league featured seven clubs and played for a total of 12 rounds. Between the early 2010s up to 2015, the club was short of two clubs and featured only five clubs and played for a total of 10 rounds with a bye week.

In 2015, the Maio Premier Division replaced the Maio Island (or Regional) Championships and the island's Second Division was established.

In the following season, the division may contain eight clubs as the last place club heads to play a division decisional match with the second placed club.

=== Title history ===
Académico 83 was the first club to win an island title, followed by Onze Unidos, Beira-Mar won their first in 1997, Académico 83 won another in 1998, Onze Unidos won six straight titles between 1999 and 2005 with the 2000 season not held. Two recent clubs won their first title, Barreirense in 2006 and Académica do Maio or Calheta in 2007, Académica do Maio from Calheta won two straight titles in 2008. Onze Unidos won in 2008 followed by Barreirense's second and recent title win, Onze Unidos again won a title for 2011, Académico won two straight in 2013, Académica da Calheta won their recent title in 2014. Académico 83 won another two straight titles, including their recent win of the 2015/16 season.

== Maio Premier Division Clubs 2017/18 ==
- Académica do Maio - Vila da Calheta
- Académico 83 - Cidade do Porto Inglês
- Barreirense - Vila do Barreiro
- Miramar - Ribeira Dom João
- Morrerense - Morro
- CD Onze Unidos - Cidade do Porto Inglês
- Real Marítimo - Cascabulho (also known as Marítimo de Cascabulho)
- Santana de Morrinho - Morrinho

== Winners ==
=== Maio Island League ===
- 1987–88: not finished
- 1988–89: not held
- 1989–90: not held
- 1990–91 : Académico 83
- 1991–92 : Onze Unidos
- 1992–93 : Onze Unidos
- 1993–94 : Académico 83
- 1994–95 : Académico 83
- 1995–96 : Onze Unidos
- 1996–97 : Beira Mar
- 1997–98 : Académico 83
- 1998–99 : Onze Unidos
- 1999–2000 : Not held
- 2000–01 : Onze Unidos
- 2001–02 : Onze Unidos
- 2002–03 : Onze Unidos
- 2003–04 : Onze Unidos
- 2004–05 : Onze Unidos
- 2005–06 : Barreirense
- 2006–07 : Académica
- 2007–08 : Académica
- 2008–09 : Onze Unidos
- 2009–10 : Barreirense
- 2010–11 : Onze Unidos
- 2011–12 : Académico 83
- 2012–13 : Académico 83
- 2013–14 : Académica
- 2014–15 : Académico 83

=== Maio Premier Division ===
- 2015–16: Académico 83
- 2016–17: Onze Unidos
- 2017–18: Barreirense
- 2018–19: Académico 83
- 2019–20: not finished due to COVID-19 pandemic
- 2020–21: not held due to COVID-19 pandemic
- 2021–22: Barreirense
- 2022–23: Figueirense
- 2023–24: Barreirense
- 2024–25: not held

=== Performance By Club ===
Club	Winners	Winning years
Onze Unidos	12	1992, 1993, 1996, 1999, 2001, 2002, 2003, 2004, 2005, 2009, 2011, 2017
Académico 83	9	1991, 1994, 1995, 1998, 2012, 2013, 2015, 2016, 2019
Barreirense	5	2006, 2010, 2018, 2022, 2024
Académica do Maio	3	2007, 2008, 2014
Figueirense	1	2023
Beira Mar	1	1997

=== Performance by area ===
Settlement or town	Winners	Winning years
Porto Inglês	21	1991, 1992, 1993, 1994, 1995, 1996, 1997, 1998, 1999, 2001, 2002, 2003, 2004, 2005, 2009, 2011, 2012, 2013, 2015, 2016, 2017, 2019
Vila da Calheta	3	2007, 2008, 2014
Vila do Barreiro	3	2006. 2010, 2018

== Youth Championships (under 17) ==
- 2012-13: Académico 83
- 2013-14: Académico 83
- 2014-15: Académico 83

== See also ==
- Maio Island Cup
- Maio Super Cup
- Maio Opening Tournament
- Maio Champion's Cup
