= Maio Opening Tournament =

Maio Island Opening Tournament
- Founded: 2001
- Region: Maio Island, Cape Verde
- Teams: 12
- Current champions: Académico 83

The Maio Island Opening Tournament (Portuguese: Torneio de Abertura da Boa Vista, Capeverdean Crioulo, ALUPEC or ALUPEK: Turnéu di Abertura di Bubista), is an opening tournament competition (equivalent to a league cup) played during the season in the island of Boa Vista, Cape Verde The competition is organized by the Boa Vista Regional Football Association. Some seasons featured rounds of one portion, some seasons featured three rounds and two groups with the top club of each group in the final match. It currently consists of seven rounds, a meeting with another club once. The winner with the most points (sometimes in the final) is the winner.

The first edition took place in 2000 and was the second regional competition after the championships. Barreirense was the first winner, Académico 83 is the recent winner won in 2013. Since 2014, likely that no further competitions taken place.

== Winners ==
Season	Winner	Runner-up
2001	Barreirense FC	
2005	Undecided	
2006	Undecided	
2007	Undecided	
2008	Undecided	
2009	Undecided	
2010	Undecided	
2011	Undecided	
2012	Undecided	
2012-13	Académico 83 do Porto Inglês	
2013	Unknown/Not held	
2014	Unknown/Not held	
2015	Unknown/Not held	
2016-17	Unknown/Not held	
2017-18	Unknown/Not held	

== See also ==
- Maio Island League
- Maio Island Cup
- Maio Island Super Cup
