= 2008–09 in Cape Verdean football =

Football in Cape Verde
- Season: 2008–09

Men's football
- 2009 Cape Verdean Football Championships: Sporting Clube da Praia

In the 2008–09 season of competitive football (soccer) in Cape Verde The 2nd Cape Verdean Cup took place in July and August.

== Diary of the season ==
- Boa Vista Island Cup held their first edition
- October 8: Cutelinho FC celebrated its 25th anniversary
- Tchadense celebrated its 25th anniversary of the foundation of the club
- February 9: Sanjoanense of Ribeira das Pratas celebrated its 25th anniversary
- Académica Operária won their 15th title for Boa Vista
- SC Morabeza won their 4th title for Brava
- Vulcânicos won their 7th title for Fogo
- Onze Unidos won their 8th title for Maio
- SC Santa Maria won their 6th and recent title for Sal
- Estrela dos Amadores won their 2nd title for Santiago North
- Académica da Praia won their only title for Santiago South
- Os Foguetões won their only title Santo Antão North
- Sporting Clube do Porto Novo won their 3rd and recent title for Santo Antão South
- FC Ultramarina won their 8th title for São Nicolau
- CS Mindelense won their 45th title for São Vicente
- April 16: 2009 Cape Verdean Football Championships began
- June 6: Mindelense defeated Os Foguetões 6-0 and made it the national championship's highest scoring match
- June 13: Mindelense, Sportings Praia and Porto Novo and Académica Praia
- July 6: Académico 83 do Porto Inglês celebrated its 25th anniversary
- June 20: Knockout stage begins
- July 4: Championship finals begins, it was the first final competition that featured two clubs from the same island as well as the same city
- July 11: Sporting Clube da Praia won their 8th national championship title

== Final standings ==
=== Cape Verdean Football Championships ===
Académica and Sporting Praia were first in each group while Mindelense and Sporting Porto Novo, second of each group. Académica Praia had the most points second were Mindelense and Sporting Praia with 12. Mindelense scored the most with 13 goals followed by Sporting Praia and Ultramarina with eleven, Académica Praia with ten and Sporting Porto Novo with nine. Later, Académica Praia advanced with four goals scored while Sporting Advanced with three. Sporting won the first match 2-0, the second leg had a goal draw, with a total of three goals, Sporting Praia claimed their 8th national title.

=== Group A ===
Pos	Team	Pld	W	D	L	GF	GA	GD	Pts
1	Académica da Praia	5	4	1	0	10	5	+5	13
2	CS Mindelense	5	4	0	1	13	4	+9	12
3	FC Ultramarina	5	2	1	2	11	6	+5	7
4	Onze Unidos	5	2	1	2	5	5	0	7
5	Sport Clube Santa Maria	5	0	2	3	6	13	-7	2
6	Foguetões	5	0	1	4	3	15	-12	1

=== Group B ===
Pos	Team	Pld	W	D	L	GF	GA	GD	Pts
1	Sporting Clube da Praia	5	4	1	0	11	1	+7	12
2	Sporting Clube do Porto Novo	5	3	0	2	9	6	+3	9
3	SC Morabeza	5	2	1	2	4	8	-4	7
4	Vulcânicos FC	5	2	1	2	3	4	-1	7
5	Estrela dos Amadores	5	2	0	3	7	8	-1	6
6	Académica Operária	5	0	1	4	2	9	-7	1

==== Final Stages ====
Semi-Finals				Finals
CS Mindelense	0	0	0
Sporting Clube da Praia	0	3	3	Sporting Clube da Praia	2	1	3
Sporting Clube do Porto Novo	1	0	1	Académica da Praia	0	1	1
Académica da Praia	4	0	4

Leading goalscorer: Kadú - 9 goals

=== Cape Verdean Cup ===
The second Cape Verdean Cup took place. Boavista Praia won their first cup title after defeating Académico do Aeroporto 1-0 in the final.

==== Participants ====
- Sport Sal Rei Club, winner of the Boa Vista Island Cup
- Académico do Aeroporto, winner of the Sal Island Cup
- Beira-Mar, winner of the Santo Antão North Cup
- Belo Horizonte, winner of the São Nicolau Cup
- Batuque, winner of the São Vicente Cup

=== Island or regional competitions ===
==== Regional Championships ====
Competition	Winners	
Competition	Premier	Second
Boa Vista	Académica Operária	
Brava	SC Morabeza	
Fogo	Vulcânicos	
Maio	Onze Unidos	
Sal	SC Santa Maria	
Santiago North Zone	Estrela dos Amadores	
Santiago South Zone	Académica da Praia	AJ Black Panthers
Santo Antão North Zone	Os Foguetões	
Santo Antão South Zone	Sporting Clube do Porto Novo	
São Nicolau	FC Ultramarina	
São Vicente	CS Mindelense	Salamansa

==== Regional Cups ====
Competition	Winners
Boa Vista	Sport Sal Rei Club
Fogo	Académica do Fogo
Maio	CD Onze Unidos
Sal	Académico do Aeroporto
Santiago South Zone	Boavista Praia
Santo Antão North Zone	Rosariense Clube
Santo Antão South Zone	Marítimo Porto Novo
São Nicolau	Belo Horizonte
São Vicente	Batuque FC

==== Regional Super Cups ====
The 2008 champion winner played with a 2008 cup winner (when a club won both, a second place club competed).

Competition	Winners
Fogo	Unknown
Sal	SC Santa Maria
Santiago North	
Santiago South	Not held
Santo Antão South	Not held
São Nicolau	Unknown
São Vicente	CS Mindelense

==== Regional Opening Tournaments ====
Competition	Winners
Boa Vista	África Show
Fogo	
Maio	
Sal	Académico do Aeroporto
Santiago South Zone	
Santo Antão North Zone	Os Foguetões
Santo Antão South Zone	
São Nicolau	Unknown
São Vicente	CS Mindelense

== Famous debutant ==
- (Cape Verde) Rambé, 18 year old striker who first participated for Batuque FC

== Transfer deals ==
- (Cape Verde) Babanco from Sporting Praia to Boavista Praia
- (Cape Verde) Figo from Académica da Praia to Amabox Barcelona Tarrafal
- (Cape Verde) Kuca from AD Bairro to Boavista Praia
- (Cape Verde) Rambé from Batuque FC to CS Mindelense
- (Cape Verde) Tom Tavares from Estrela dos Amadores to Sporting Praia

== See also ==
- 2008 in Cape Verde
- 2009 in Cape Verde
- Timeline of Cape Verdean football
