= List of football clubs in Cape Verde =

Football (soccer) clubs in Cape Verde include:

== Key ==
Key to divisional change
New club
Club was promoted to a higher level,
winner or runner-up of each regional league qualified into the National Championships
Club was transferred between divisions at the same level
Club resigned or was demoted to a lower level
Club was relegated to a lower level
Lowest division contains only a single division

=== A ===
Club	Location	League/Division (Regional)	Lvl	Change from 2016 to 2017
ABC de Patim	Patim	Fogo Island Second Division	3	
Académica da Brava	Vila Nova Sintra	Brava Island League	2	
Académica do Sal	Espargos	Sal Island League	2	
Académica do Mindelo		São Vicente Island League	2	
Associação Académica do Porto Novo		Southern Santo Antão Regional League	2	Qualified and participated in the National Championships as regional winner
Académica da Praia		Southern Santiago Premier Division	2	
Académica da Preguiça		São Nicolau Island League	2	
Académica da Calheta		Maio Island Premier Division	2	
Académica Operária	Sal Rei	Boa Vista Island League	2	
Academico 83	Cidade do Maio	Maio Island League	2	
Académico do Aeroporto	Espargos	Sal Island Premier Division	2	Qualified and participated into the National Championships as regional winner
ADEC	Calheta de São Miguel	Northern Santiago Second Division	3	
África Show	Rabil	Boa Vista Island League	2	
AJAC	Calheta de São Miguel	Northern Santiago Premier Division	2	Qualified and participated in the National Championships as regional winner
AJAT'SN	Tarrafal do São Nicolau	São Nicolau Island League	2	
GD Amarantes	Mindelo	São Vicente Island League	3	
Asa Grande	Praia	Southern Santiago Second Division	3	
ASGUI	Santa Maria	Sal Island Premier Division	3	
Desportivo de Assomada/ADENE		Northern Santiago Second Division	3	
Atlântico	São Filipe	Fogo Island Second Division	3	
Atlético	Mosteiros	Fogo Premier Division	2	Promoted into the Regional Premier Division
SC Atlético	Ribeira Brava	São Nicolau Island League	2	

=== B ===
Club	Location	League/Division (Regional)	Lvl	Change from 2016 to 2017
AD Bairro	Craveiro Lopes neighbourhood of Praia	Southern Santiago Premier Division	2	
Barreirense	Barreiro	Maio Premier Division	2	
Batuque FC	Mindelo	São Vicente Premier Division	2	
Baxada (Note: Also known as Beira Mar or Baixada Fluminense)	Cova Figueira	Fogo Island Premier Division	2	Relegated to the Regional Second Division
FC Belo Horizonte	Juncalinho	São Nicolau Island League	2	
Beira-Mar	Ribeira Grande	Northern Santo Antão Premier Division	2	
Beira-Mar (Maio)	Cidade do Maio	Maio Second Division	3	
Beira-Mar	Tarrafal	Northern Santiago Premier Division	2	
Benfica	Nova Sintra	Brava Island League	2	
Benfica	Praia	Southern Santiago Premier Division	2	
Benfica	Santa Cruz	Northern Santiago Premier Division	2	
Boavista Futebol Clube	Praia	Southern Santiago Premier Division	2	
Botafogo FC	São Filipe	Fogo Premier Division	2	
Brasilim	Monte Vaca, São Filipe	Fogo Second Division	3	

=== C ===
Club	Location	League/Division (Regional)	Lvl	Change from 2016 to 2017
Calhau		São Vicente Second Division	3	
Calheta, Desportivo da	Calheta de São Miguel	Santiago North Premier Division	2	
GS Castilho	Mindelo	São Vicente Premier Division	2	Promoted into the Regional Premier Division
Celtic FC	Achadinha de Baixo neighbourhood, Praia	Southern Santiago Second Division	2	
Chã de Matias	Espargos	Sal Island Second Division	3	
Chão Bom or Tchom Bom	Chão Bom	Santiago Island Second Division	3	
SC Corinthians São Vicente	Mindelo	São Vicente Second Division	3	
Clube Desportivo Corôa	Nossa Senhora do Monte village	Brava Island League	2	
Cova Figueira, Desportivo	Cova Figueira	Fogo Island Second Division	3	
Cruzeiro	Calheta	Maio Island League	2	
Cutelinho FC	Mosteiros	Fogo Premier Division	2	

=== D ===
Club	Location	League/Division (Regional)	Lvl	Change from 2016 to 2017
GDRC Delta	Praia	Southern Santiago Second Division	3	
Delta Cultura	Tarrafal	Northern Santiago Second Division	3	
FC Derby	Mindelo	São Vicente Premier Division	2	Qualified and participated into the National Championship as runner-up
Desportivo da Praia		Southern Santiago Premier Division	2	
Desportivo de Santa Cruz		Santiago North Second Division	3	Relegated to the Regional Second Division

=== E ===
Club	Location	League/Division (Regional)	Lvl	Change from 2016 to 2017
Esperança		Fogo Island Second Division	3	
Esperança Assomada	Assomada	Santiago Regional Second Division	3	
Desportivo Estância Baixo		Boa Vista Island League	2	
Estrela dos Amadores	Tarrafal	Northern Santiago Premier Division	2	

=== F ===
Club	Location	League/Division (Regional)	Lvl	Change from 2016 to 2017
Falcões do Norte	Chã de Alecrim, Mindelo	São Vicente Second Division	3	Relegated to the Regional Second Division
Farense de Fonte Filipe, Sporting	Fonte de Filipe, Mindelo	São Vicente Premier Division	2	
SC Figueira Pavão	Figueira Pavão	Fogo Second Division	3	New club
Fiorentina-Calabaceira	Calabaceira in Praia	Southern Santiago Second Division	3	
GDRC Fiorentina	Porto Novo	Northern Santo Antão Premier Division	2	
Florença	Espargos	Sal Island Premier Division	2	
Flor Jovem da Calheta		Northern Santiago Premier Division	2	
Foguetões	Eito, Upper Ribeira do Paul	Northern Santo Antão Premier Division	2	
Figueirense	Figueira da Horta	Maio Second Division	3	

=== G ===
Club	Location	League/Division (Regional)	Lvl	Change from 2016 to 2017
Os Garridos	São Domingos Municipality	Santiago Island Second Division	3	Relegated to the Regional Second Division
Gaviões	Hortelão, Espargos	Sal Island Second Division	3	
Grito Povo	Ribeira do Ilhéu	Fogo Island Second Division	2	

=== I ===
Club	Location	League/Division (Regional)	Lvl	Change from 2016 to 2017
Inter Cutelo	Cutelo in Assomada	Northern Santiago Second Division	3	
Inter de Porto Novo		Southern Santo Antão Regional League	2	
Irmãos Unidos	Paul	Northern Santo Antão Second Division	3	Repeatedly withdrew for the season

=== J ===
Club	Location	League/Division (Regional)	Lvl	Change from 2016 to 2017
Janela		Santo Antão North Second Division	3	Relegated to the Regional Second Division
Jovens Unidos	Ribeira Funda, Espargos	Sal Regional Second Division	3	
Juventude de Assomada		Santiago North Second Division	3	Returned after a few seasons of absence
Juventude da Furna		Brava Island League	2	
Juventude do Norte	Fundo das Figueiras and João Galego	Boa Vista Island League	2	
Juventude	Espargos	Sal Premier Division	2	
Associação Juventus	Assomada	Santiago North Second Division	3	Relegated to the Regional Second Division
Juventus	Curral Grande	Fogo Second Division	3	New club

=== K ===
Club	Location	League/Division (Regional)	Lvl	Change from 2016 to 2017
Kumunidade (Note: Sometimes as Kumunidadi)	Praia	Southern Santiago Second Division	3	

=== L ===
Club	Location	League/Division (Regional)	Lvl	Change from 2016 to 2017
Lajedos FC (Note: Also known as Lagedos)		Southern Santo Antão Island League	2	
Eugénio Lima	Praia	Southern Santiago Premier Division	2	
Luzabril	Luzia Nunes	Fogo Second Division	3	

=== M ===
Club	Location	League/Division (Regional)	Lvl	Change from 2016 to 2017
CS Marítimo	Porto Novo	Southern Santo Antão Island League	2	
CS Mindelense	Mindelo	São Vicente Premier Division	2	Qualified into the 2017 Cape Verdean National Championship as winner
SC Miramar	Ribeira Dom João	Maio Island Second Division	3	
SC Morabeza	Vila Nova Sintra	Brava Island League	2	
Morrerense or Morreirense	Morreiro	Maio Premier Division	2	

=== N ===
Club	Location	League/Division (Regional)	Lvl	Change from 2016 to 2017
Associação Nhagar	Assomada	Northern Santiago Second Division	3	
Grémio Desportivo de Nhagar	Assomada	Northern Santiago Premier Division	2	
Nova Era	São Filipe	Fogo Premier Division	2	Promoted into the Regional Premier Division
Nova Geração	East Espargos	Sal Second Division	3	
Nô Pintcha	Nova Sintra	Brava Island League	2	
Nô Pintcha do Mosteiros		Fogo Premier Division	2	

=== O ===
Club	Location	League/Division (Regional)	Lvl	Change from 2016 to 2017
Oásis Atlântico	Santa Maria	Sal Second Division	3	New club
Onze Estrelas	Bofarreira	Boa Vista Island League	2	
Onze Unidos	Cidade do Maio	Maio Premier Division	2	

=== P ===
Club	Location	League/Division (Regional)	Lvl	Change from 2016 to 2017
GD Palmeira	Santa Maria	Sal Island Premier Division	2	
Parque Real	Cova Figueira	Fogo Second Division	3	
Paulense Desportivo Clube	Paul	Northern Santo Antão Premier Division	2	
Ponta de Pom (Note: also as Ponta Pon, Ponta d'Pon and Ponta d'Pom)		São Vicente Second Division	3	
Portas Abertas	Boa Entrada or Fundura	Northern Santiago Second Division	3	
Futebol Clube Praia Branca		São Nicolau Island League	2	
GDRC Pretória	Espargos	Sal Second Division	3	

=== R ===
Club	Location	League/Division (Regional)	Lvl	Change from 2016 to 2017
Real Júnior	Chão Bom/Tarrafal	Northern Santiago Second Division	3	Returned into the Regional Second Division
Real Marítimo	Cascabulho	Maio Island League	2	Uncertain
Relâmpago	West Praia	Santiago Regional Second Division	3	
CD Ribeira Brava		São Nicolau Island League	2	
Ribeira Bote		São Vicente Second Division	3	
Ribeira Grande	Cidade Velha	Santiago South Premier Division	2	Promoted into the Regional Premier Division
Rosariense Clube	Ribeira Grande, Nossa Senhora do Rosário parish	Santo Antão North Premier Division	2	Promoted into the Regional Premier Division

=== S ===
Club	Location	League/Division (Regional)	Lvl	Change from 2015 to 2016
Salamansa FC	Salamansa	São Vicente Premier Division	2	
Sport Sal Rei Club (Note: Sal Rei FC, SC Sal-Rei or SC Sal Rei)		Boa Vista Island League	2	Qualified and participated in the National Championships as regional winner
Santa Clara	Alcatraz, Pilão Cão	Maio Regional Second Division	3	
SC Santa Maria		Sal Premier Division	2	
Santana de Morrinho		Maio Premier Division	2	
Sanjoanense	Fundo das Figueiras	Boa Vista Island League	2	
Sanjoanense (Porto Novo)		Southern Santo Antão Island League	2	
Santo André	Norte	Southern Santo Antão Island League	2	
Santo Crucifíxio	Coculi	Northern Santo Antão Premier Division	2	
GDR São Lourenço	João Teves	Northern Santiago Premier Division	2	Promoted into the Regional Premier Division
São Pedro Apostolo	Garça de Cima	Northern Santo Antão Second Division	3	
Scorpion Vermelho	Santa Cruz	Northern Santiago Premier Division	2	
CD Sinagoga		Northern Santo Antão Premier Division	2	
Solpontense Futebol Clube	Ponta do Sol	Northern Santo Antão Second Division	3	
Spartak d'Aguadinha		Fogo Premier Division	2	
Sporting Clube da Boa Vista	Sal Rei	Boa Vista Island League	2	
Sporting Clube da Brava	Nova Sintra	Brava Island League	2	Qualified and participated in the National Championships as regional winner
Sporting Clube do Porto Novo		Southern Santo Antão Island League	2	
Sporting Clube da Praia		Southern Santiago Premier Division	2	Qualified and participated in the National Championships as regional winner

=== T ===
Club	Location	League/Division (Regional)	Lvl	Change from 2016 to 2017
FC Talho		São Nicolau Island League	2	
Tarrafal FC de Monte Trigo		Southern Santo Antão Island League	2	Returned after financial problems
Tchadense	Achada de Santo António, Praia	Southern Santiago Premier Division	2	
AD Tira Chapĭu	Tira Chapêu and West Praia	Southern Santiago Second Division	3	
Torreense	Xoxo and Ribeira da Torre including Corda	Northern Santo Antão Second Division	3	
CD Travadores	Praia	Southern Santiago Premier Division	2	

=== U ===
Club	Location	League/Division (Regional)	Lvl	Change from 2016 to 2017
FC Ultramarina	Ribeira Brava	São Nicolau Island League	2	
União de São Lourenço		Fogo Second Division	3	
União Picos	São Salvador do Mundo Municipality	Northern Santiago Second Division	3	Relegated to the Regional Second Division
Unidos do Norte (Note: Formerly known as União dos Norte)	Ponta d'Agua and Achada de São Filipe, Praia	Southern Santiago Premier Division	2	

=== V ===
Club	Location	League/Division (Regional)	Lvl	Change from 2016 to 2017
Valência	As Hortas	Fogo Premier Division	2	
Varanda	Achadinha de Baixo, Praia	Southern Santiago Premier Division	2	Promoted into the Regional Premier Division
Varandinha	Tarrafal	Northern Santiago Premier Division	2	
SC Verdun	Pedra de Lume	Sal Second Division	3	Relegated to the Regional Second Division
GDRC Vila Nova	Vila Nova, Praia	Southern Santiago Second Division	3	
Vitória FC	Praia	Santiago South Second Division	3	Relegated to the Regional Second Division
Vulcânicos FC	São Filipe	Fogo Premier Division	2	Qualified and participated in the National Championships as regional winner

== Former clubs ==
Club	Location	League/Division (Regional)	Founded	Dissolved	Status
Àfrica Negra	Milho Branco	Santiago Island League	1990s	2000s	Never registered
Aliança	Praia	Santiago South Premier Division			Never registered, now part of Unidos do Norte
Os Amigos	Assomada	Northern Santiago Second Division			football club no longer exists
Andorinha	São Domingos	Santiago South Regional Championships			now part of Os Garridos
Avenida 77	North Praia	Santiago South Regional Championships	2006	2009	now part of Benfica Praia
Barcelona (Tarrafal)	Tarrafal	Northern Santiago Regional League	1995	2016	football club no longer exists
Black Panthers	Praia	Santiago South Regional Championships	2006	2008	football club no longer exists
Sport Clube Caleijão		São Nicolau Island League		2012	football club no longer exists
Dynamo de Cova Figueira		Fogo Island League			now part of Desportivo Cova Figueira
Filhos de São Miguel	Calheta de São Miguel	Santiago North Regional Championships	2000s		football club no longer exists
Fontes	Fonte Lima?	Santiago North Regional Championships	2000s		football club no longer exists
Jentabus	North Praia	Santiago South Regional Championships	2006	2009	now part of Benfica Praia
Lapaloma	Praia	Santiago South Regional Championships		2013	now part of another club
Paiol	Paol, Praia	Santiago South Regional Championships	1990s	2005	now part of Unidos do Norte
Praia Rural		Santiago South Island League	1990s	2005	now part of Unidos do Norte
Tribo do Sol	São Filipe	Fogo Island League	2006	2008	now part of Nova Era

== See also ==
- Football in Cape Verde
- Category:Football clubs in Cape Verde
