= CD Sinagoga =

Cape Verdean football club

Sinagoga
- Full name: Clube Desportivo Sinagoga
- Ground: Sinagoga on the island of Santo Antão, Cape Verde
- Chairman: Rui Fernandes
- Manager: Cadoram
- League: Santo Antão Island League (North)
- 2015–16: 1st
Home colours	Away colours

Clube Desportivo Sinagoga, also known as Sinagoga Futebol Clube (also in the Capeverdean Crioulo forms of ALUPEC or ALUPEK and the São Vicente Crioulo) is a football club that had played in the Premier division and plays in the Santo Antão Island League South Zone in Cape Verde. It is based in the village of Sinagoga in the northeastern part of the island of Santo Antão. Its current manager is Cadoram since November 2016. The stadium is located in the northern part of the island, next to the mountains in Ponta do Sol at Estádio João Serra.

== Area ==
The club area serves the easternmost areas of the municipality of Ribeira Grande and the eastern part of the parish of Nossa Senhora do Rosário. The club area serves the village of Sinagoga along with the settlements of Lombo Branco, Monte Joana and Pinhão.

== History ==
In mid-2004, CD Sinagoga became a registered club of the Santo Antão North Zone Football Association and participated for the first time in the 2005 season.

Sinagoga won their first cup title in 2005 and then their second in 2014 and are now two clubs in the North Zone possessing the second most cup titles, the other being Rosariense. As cup winner, Sinagoga faced off against the champion Paulense in the 2014 in the Santo Antão North Zone Super Cup and lost to Paulense. Also in 2014, Sinagoga won their only opening tournament title.

Sinagoga finished first in the Santo Antão North Zone with 28 points, 9 wins and a draw, it was the best season the club had. Now, Sinagoga won their only championship title for the 2015/16 season, it is one of some clubs in Cape Verde that appeared in the national championship for the first time in mid May, the club finished last in Group A with 2 points, four goals were scored and never got a win. Also Sinagoga made it up to the finals of the 2016 North Zone's cup and lost to Paulense. Sinagoga faced Paulense, overall their second time the cup winner in the Northern Santo Antão Super Cup and Sinagoga became the recent club the claim the first title. Also as champion of the North Zone, Sinagoga qualified into the Santo Antão Super Cup for the first time, Sinagoga lost the competition in the finals to Académica do Porto Novo.

In the 2016–17 season, the club had a near successful season but finished as a runner-up in the regional Premier Division behind Paulense again, they had 15 points, four wins and four draws and had fewer goals scored with 13, fourth overall which was fewer than fifth placed Os Foguetões. It was a different direction for Sinagoga as Paulense was out in the quarterfinals in the North Zone's cup competition, Sinagoga reached the semis on February 25 and on April 17, the finals and the club lost in the penalty shootouts to Rosariense..

Sinagoga started off the 2017–18 season well with better performance than Paulense but not Rosariense as they would be in mid-position, they had 7 points with two wins and a draw with their recent on January 21 with a 1–0 win over Foguetões. At the seventh round, Sinagoga remain fifth with the same points they had at the fourth round. Sinagoga lost to Paulense on February 11 and started to lose a chance for another title. A goal draw was made with Beira Mar on March 3 and another loss was made in the 9th round. Sinagoga was fourth place, their maximum position for the season. Sinagoga's last challenge, a three-goal draw with Rosariense and finished with the same wins draws and 9 points with Beira Mar, Sinagoga conceded 18 goals, more than that club. It was thought to be good news was they originally fled the relegation zone as they finished fifth, Paulense being awarded a 3–0 win over Santo Crucifixo in mid April. Sinagoga will be relegated for the first time next season as they officially finished last. Sinagoga was one of the three remaining Premier Division clubs, the others being Desportivo and Os Foguetões.

== Logo and uniform ==
Its logo features a light silver pointed semicircular shield with a thin black circle rim in the middle, the club name on top (also as Sinagoga Futebol Clube), two black edges on the bottom and the club's location under the island name on bottom. Two red colored sharks or tuna are on top over the soccer ball.

Its uniform for home has a blue T-shirt with white sleeves and thin sides and has blue shorts and white socks, its away uniform has its color white except for its shorts which are blue.

== Stadium ==
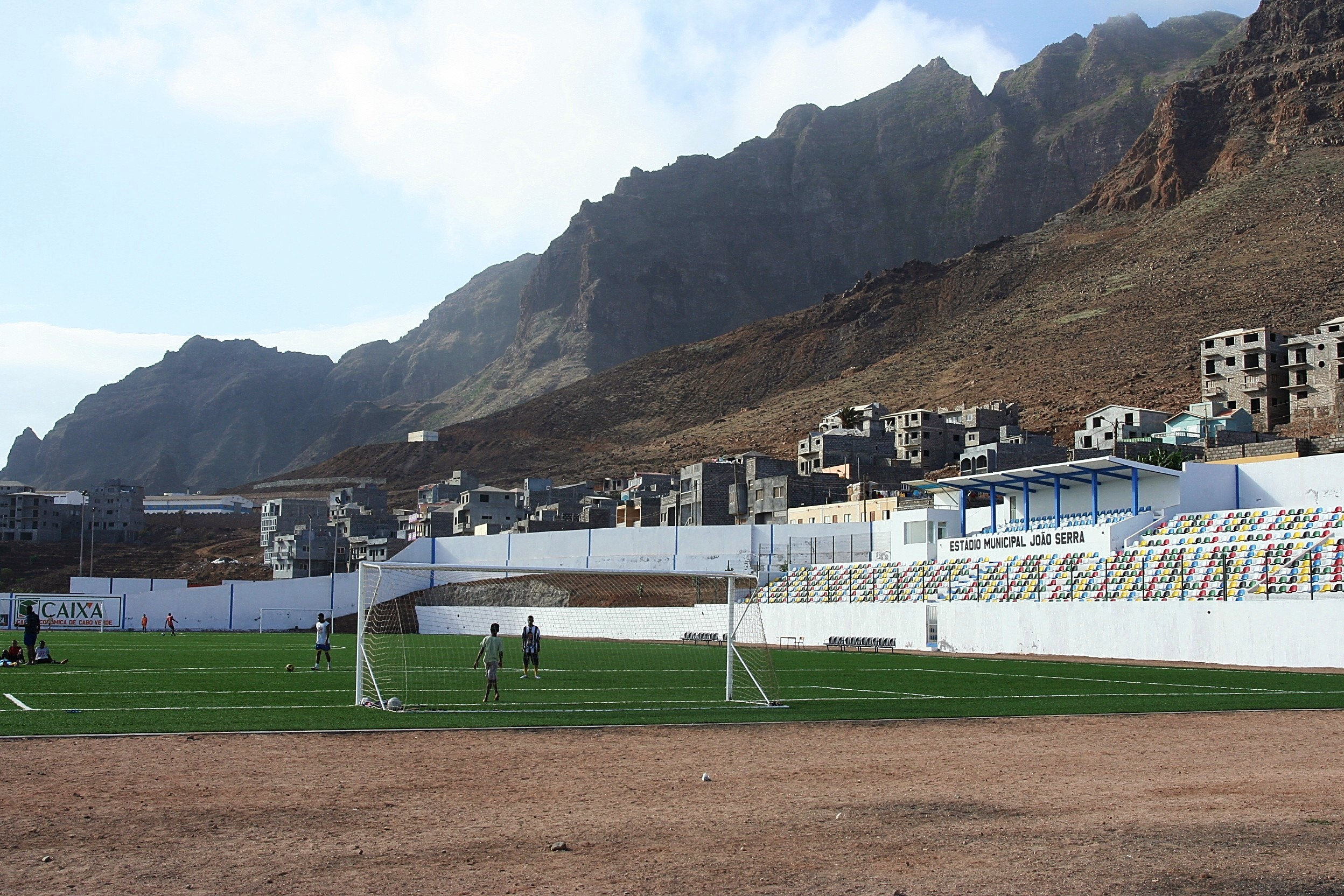
Estádio João Serra, the stadium also used by CD Sinagoga

Estádio João Serra is a multi-use stadium in of Ponta do Sol, Cape Verde. It is currently used mostly for football matches. The stadium holds 2,000. The stadium has seat rows in the south side and is located south of the town center. Every club of the Santo Antão Premier and Second Division including Sinagoga plays at the stadium along with Rosariense, Paulense, Beira Mar and Os Foguetões. Also the stadium is home to Solpontense.

As Sinagoga has no football field of its own, their main home stadium is Campo de Futebol de Tarrafal, located in Ribeira Grande just south of the Atlantic which has no seats, it sits with the main road (Estrada de Vale de Paul) connecting Ribeira Grande and Porto Novo (EN1-SA01) via Janela, though primarily trains at that field.

== Honours ==
- Santo Antão Island League (North): 1

2015/16

- Ribeira Grande Cup: 2

2004/05, 2013/14

- Ribeira Grande Super Cup: 1

2016

- Santo Antão North Opening Tournament: 1

2014/15

=== Other ===
- Municipal:
  - Ribeira Grande Municipal Tournament: 1

2016

== League and cup history ==
=== National championship ===
Season	Div.	Pos.	Pl.	W	D	L	GS	GA	GD	P	Notes	Playoffs
2016	1A	6	5	0	2	3	4	10	-6	2	Did not advance	Did not participate
Total:			5	0	2	3	4	10	-6	2		

=== Regional Championship ===
Season	Div.	Pos.	Pl.	W	D	L	GS	GA	GD	P	Santo Antão North Cup	Santo Antāo Super Cup	Tour	Notes
2013–14	2	3	10	3	3	4	14	15	-1	12	Winner		Winner	
2014–15	2	2	10	5	2	3	15	12	-3	17				
2015–16	2	1	10	9	1	0	19	3	+16	28	Finalist	Finalist	Not held	Promoted into the National Championships
2016–17	2	2	10	4	3	3	13	10	+3	15	Finalist	Not held	Not held	
2017–18	2	6	10	2	3	5	11	18	-7	9		Not held	Not held	To be relegated to the regional Second Division

== Statistics ==
- Best ranking: 6th (national) – group stage
- Appearances at the championships:
  - National (tier 1) Once, in 2016
  - Regional: Tier 2: 14
- Appearances at a Super Cup competition:
  - Santo Antão South Zone: 2
  - Santo Antão: Once
- Total goals scored: 4 (national)
- Total points: 2 (national)
- Highest number of points in a season: 28 (regional), in 2016
- Highest number of wins in a season: 9 (regional), in 2016
- Highest scoring match at the National Championships: 2 matches with two goals
  - Sinagoga 2–3 Sporting Brava, May 15, 2016
  - SC Atlético 2–2 Sinagoga, June 4, 2016

== Current squad ==
As of 15 February 2017

Note: Flags indicate national team as defined under FIFA eligibility rules; some limited exceptions apply. Players may hold more than one non-FIFA nationality.

No.	Pos.	Nation	Player
—		CPV	Gogol

== Managerial history ==
- (Cape Verde) Narciso (until November 2016)
- (Cape Verde) Cadoram (since November 2016)
