= 2009 Cape Verdean Football Championships =

Cape Verdean Football Championship
- Season: 2009
- Champions: Sporting Clube da Praia
- Matches played: 36
- Goals scored: 96 (2.67 per match)
- Top goalscorer: Kadu (7)
- Biggest home win: Mindelense

The 2009 Cape Verdean Football Championship season was the 30th of the competition of the first-tier football in Cape Verde. Its started on 16 April, earlier than the last season and finished on 11 June. The tournament was organized by the Cape Verdean Football Federation. Sporting would win their 8th title and fourth straight after defeating the city's rival Académica. This was the first final competition that featured two clubs from the same island as well as the same city, it happened the following season with Boavista. Sporting Praia's next and final title would win in 2012.

== Overview ==
Sporting Clube da Praia was again the defending team of the title. A total of 12 clubs participated in the competition, one from each island league and one who won the last season's title.

It was the only club that got three titles until 2016 when CS Mindelense became the second club to win three back-to-back titles. The biggest win was Mindelense who scored 6 against Foguetões. Only one match which one team scored the highest point and the season was again not the retelling of high scoring records.

The championships was the last appearance for Académica Praia.

== Participating clubs ==

Participating football (soccer) clubs of the 2009 Cape Verdean Football Championships (Cape Verde)
- Sporting Clube da Praia, winner of the 2008 Cape Verdean Football Championships
- Académica Operária, winner of the Boa Vista Island League
- SC Morabeza, winner of the Brava Island League
- Vulcânicos FC, winner of the Fogo Island League
- Onze Unidos, winner of the Maio Island League
- Sport Clube Santa Maria, winner of the Sal Island League
- Estrela dos Amadores, winner of the Santiago Island League (North)
- Académica da Praia, winner of the Santiago Island League (South)
- Os Foguetões, winner of the Santo Antão Island League (North)
- Sporting Clube do Porto Novo, winner of the Santo Antão Island League (South)
- FC Ultramarina, winner of the São Nicolau Island League
- CS Mindelense, winner of the São Vicente Island League

=== Information about the clubs ===
Club	Location	Venue	Capacity
Académica Operária	Sal Rei	Arsénio Ramos	500
Académica da Praia	Praia	Várzea	12,000
Estrela dos Amadores	Tarrafal	Tarrafal	1,000
Foguetões	Paúl	João Serra	1,000
CS Mindelense	Mindelo	Adérito Sena	5,000
SC Morabeza	Vila Nova Sintra	Aquiles de Oliveira	500
Onze Unidos	Vila do Maio	20 de Janeiro	4,000
Sport Clube Santa Maria	Santa Maria	Marcelo Leitão	8,000
Sporting Clube do Porto Novo	Porto Novo	Amílcar Cabral	500
Sporting Clube da Praia	Praia	Várzea	12,000
FC Ultramarina	Tarrafal de São Nicolau	Orlando Rodrigues	5,000
Vulcânicos FC	São Filipe	5 de Julho	1,000

== League standings ==
=== Group A ===
Pos	Team	Pld	W	D	L	GF	GA	GD	Pts
1	Académica da Praia	5	4	1	0	10	5	+5	13
2	CS Mindelense	5	4	0	1	13	4	+9	12
3	FC Ultramarina	5	2	1	2	11	6	+5	7
4	Onze Unidos	5	2	1	2	5	5	0	7
5	Sport Clube Santa Maria	5	0	2	3	6	13	-7	2
6	Foguetões	5	0	1	4	3	15	-12	1

=== Group B ===
Pos	Team	Pld	W	D	L	GF	GA	GD	Pts
1	Sporting Clube da Praia	5	4	1	0	11	1	+7	12
2	Sporting Clube do Porto Novo	5	3	0	2	9	6	+3	9
3	SC Morabeza	5	2	1	2	4	8	-4	7
4	Vulcânicos FC	5	2	1	2	3	4	-1	7
5	Estrela dos Amadores	5	2	0	3	7	8	-1	6
6	Académica Operária	5	0	1	4	2	9	-7	1

== Results ==
Week 1
Home	Score	Visitor	Date
Mindelense	2 - 0	Onze Unidos	16 May
Foguetões	0 - 1	Académica Praia	17 May
Ultramarina	4 - 0	Santa Maria	9 June
Sporting Praia	0 - 0	Vulcânico	16 May
Sporting Porto Novo	2 - 0	Académica Operária	16 May
Morabeza	2 - 1	Estrela Amadores	17 May

Week 2
Home	Score	Visitor	Date
Santa Maria	1 - 2	Mindelense	23 May
Onze Unidos	1 - 0	Foguetões	23 May
Académica Praia	3 - 1	Ultramarina	23 May
Académica Operária	1 - 3	Sporting Praia	23 May
Vulcânico	0 - 2	Morabeza	24 May
Estrela Amadores	3 - 2	Sporting Porto Novo	24 May

Week 3
Home	Score	Visitor	Date
Foguetões	3 - 3	Santa Maria	30 May
Académica Praia	2 - 1	Onze Unidos	30 May
Ultramarina	1 - 2	Mindelense	31 May
Sporting Porto Novo	0 - 3	Sporting Praia	30 May
Estrela Amadores	0 - 2	Vulcânico	30 May
Morabeza	0 - 0	Acádemica Operária	31 May

Week 4
Home	Score	Visitor	Date
Académica Praia	2 - 2	Santa Maria	6 June
Onze Unidos	1 - 1	Ultramarina	6 June
Mindelense	6 - 0	Foguetões	6 June
Vulcânico	0 - 2	Sporting Porto Novo	6 June
Estrela Amadores	3 - 1	Acádemica Operária	6 June
Sporting Praia	4 - 0	Morabeza	7 June

Week 5
Home	Score	Visitor	Date
Mindelense	1 - 2	Académica Praia	13 June
Santa Maria	0 - 2	Onze Unidos	13 June
Foguetões	0 - 4	Ultramarina	13 June
Sporting Praia	1 - 0	Estrela Amadores	13 June
Acádemica Operária	0 - 1	Vulcânico	13 June
Morabeza	0 - 3	Sporting Porto Novo	13 June

== Final Stages ==
Semi-Finals				Finals
CS Mindelense	0	0	0
Sporting Clube da Praia	0	3	3	Sporting Clube da Praia	2	1	3
Sporting Clube do Porto Novo	1	0	1	Académica da Praia	0	1	1
Académica da Praia	4	0	4

=== Semi-finals ===
20 June 2009

CS Mindelense	0:0	Sporting Clube da Praia

Estádio Municipal Adérito Sena, Mindelo
Referee: Nelson Barbosa

20 June 2009

Sporting Clube do Porto Novo	1:4	Académica da Praia
Fogá 76'		Niki 32'; Gerson; Vando; 83'

Estádio Municipal Amílcar Cabral, Porto Novo
Referee: Victor Lima

27 June 2009

Sporting Clube da Praia	3:0	CS Mindelense
Dário 18'(pen.); Nuna 27'; Di I 72'

Estádio da Várzea, Praia
Referee: Mário Paixão

27 June 2009

Académica da Praia	0:0	Sporting Clube do Porto Novo

Estádio da Várzea, Praia
Referee: Nilton César Medina

=== Finals ===
4 July 2009

Sporting Clube da Praia	2:0	Académica da Praia
Nuna 48' 52'

Estádio da Várzea
Praia
Referee: Victor Lima

11 July 2009

Académica da Praia	1:1	Sporting Clube da Praia
Body 40'		Nuna 49'

Estádio da Várzea
Praia
Referee: António Rodrigues

Cape Verdean Football 2009
Champions
Sporting Clube da Praia
8th title

== Statistics ==
- Top scorer: Kadú: 9 goals (CS Mindelense)
- Biggest win: Mindelense 6 - 0 Foguetões (6 June)

== See also ==
- 2008–09 in Cape Verdean football
- 2009 Cape Verdean Cup
