= List of football clubs in Cape Verde by competitive honours won =

This is a list of the honours won by football clubs in Cape Verde. It lists every Capeverdean association football club to have won any of the trophies at the national and the regional level. Cape Verdean clubs never won any major official African competition.

== Honours table ==
=== National ===
It lists every Capeverdean association football club to have won any of the major domestic trophies, the Cape Verdean Football Championships, the Cape Verdean Cup and the Cape Verdean Super Cup.

Cape Verde is one of a very few countries in which a regional winner competes at the national championship and stays for a season except for the champion. It is one of a very few countries that uses the points system at the national level and now has only 6 rounds per group and the knockout phase.

	Club	Championship	Cup	Super Cup	Total	Last Trophy
1	CS Mindelense	12	1	1	14	2016 Championships
2	Sporting Clube da Praia	10	0	1	11	2017 Championship
3	Boavista	3	2	0	5	2010 Cup
4	FC Derby	3	0	0	3	2005 Championship
5	CD Travadores	2	0	0	2	1996 Championship
=	Onze Unidos	1	1	0	2	2012 Cup
8	Académica Operária	1	0	0	1	1983 Championship
=	Académica do Sal	1	0	0	1	1993 Championship
=	Académica do Mindelo	1	0	0	1	1989 Championship
=	Académico do Aeroporto	1	0	0	1	2003 Championship
=	Amarante	1	0	0	1	1999 Championship
=	Botafogo	1	0	0	1	1980 Championship
=	Sport Sal Rei Club	1	0	0	1	2004 Championship
=	Académica da Praia	0	1	0	1	2007 Cup

=== Regional ===
It lists every regional association football club to have won any of the minor domestic trophies, the Championship, the Cup, the Super Cup, the Opening Tournament (Association Sup in some areas) and the Champions' Cup of some islands.

The regional title lists titles won during the Colonial era and since independence.

==== Boa Vista ====
	Club	Championship	Cup	Super Cup	Association Cup (Note: Known as the Opening Tournament until 2009)	Total	Last Trophy
1	Académica Operária	19	0	2	4	25	2017 Super Cup
2	Sport Sal Rei Club	11	7	2	1	21	2018 Cup
3	Onze Estrelas	1	1	1	1	4	2017 Association Cup
4	África Show	0	1	0	3	4	2011 Cup
=	Juventude do Norte	0	1	1	1	3	2012 Super Cup
6	Sporting Boa Vista	1	0	0	0	1	2010 Championship

==== Brava ====
	Club	Championship	Cup	Super Cup	Tournament	Total	Last Trophy
1	Nô Pintcha	15	0	0	3	18	2014 Tournament
2	Morabeza	10	0	0	1	11	2018 Championship
3	Sporting Clube da Brava	4	1	1	3	9	2017 Championship
=	Juventude da Furna	1	2	2	1	6	2013 Super Cup
5	Académica da Brava	2	0	1	0	3	2016 Super Cup
6	Corôa	1	0	0	0	1	2008 Championship
=	Benfica da Brava	0	0	0	1	1	2003 Tournament

==== Fogo ====
	Club	Championship	Cup	Super Cup	Tournament	Trophy (Note: Known as the Champion's Cup)	Total	Last Trophy
1	Botafogo	17	3	0	1	0	21	2010 Cup
2	Académica do Fogo	13	4	0	0	0	17	2018 Cup
3	Vulcânicos	11	1	2	0	1	15	2018 Championship
4	Cutelinho	1	0	1	1	0	3	2005 Super Cup
5	Spartak d'Aguadinha	1	1	0	0	0	2	2015 Championship
6	Valência	0	1	1	0	0	2	2013 Super Cup

==== Maio ====
	Club	Championship	Cup	Super Cup	Tournament	Trophy (Note: Known as the Champions' Cup)	Total	Last Trophy
1	Onze Unidos	12	4	1	0	1	18	2018 Cup
2	Académico 83	9	3	3	1	0	16	2016 Super Cup
3	Barreirense	2	1	1	1	0	5	2010 Super Cup
4	Académica da Calheta	3	1	0	0	0	4	2014 Championship
5	Beira-Mar	1	0	0	0	0	1	1997 Championship
6	Real Marítimo	0	0	0	0	1	1	2016 Champions' Cup

==== Sal ====
	Club	Championship	Cup	Super Cup	Association Cup	Total	Last Trophy
1	Académico do Aeroporto do Sal	15	4	6	7	32	2017 Super Cup
2	Académica do Sal	6	5	0	5	16	2017 Cup
3	SC Santa Maria	7	1	1	2	11	2018 Cup
4	GD Palmeira	3	3	1	1	8	2018 Championship
5	Juventude	4	3	0	0	7	2016 Cup
6	Verdun-Pedra de Lume	2	1	2	0	5	2014 Super Cup

==== Santiago ====
Since 2003, the island competitions are divided into two Zones. The North Zone does not have the Cup the Super Cup and the Opening Tournament competitions. Its lists both the totals and the two zones from 2003

===== Total =====
	Club	Championship	Cup	Super Cup	Association Cup	Total	Last Trophy
1	Sporting Clube da Praia	23	4	2	3	32	2018 Cup
2	Boavista Praia	8	4	1	1	14	2015 Super Cup
3	Travadores	9	1	0	0	10	2013 Cup
4	Académica da Praia	6	3	0	0	9	2018 Championship
5	Scorpion Vermelho	5	2	1	0	8	2018 Championship
6	Desportivo da Praia	2	0	0	2	4	2016 Championship
7	Estrela dos Amadores	3	0	0	0	3	2012 Championship
=	ADESBA	0	2	1	0	3	2012 Super Cup
9	Amabox Barcelona	2	0	0	0	2	2003 Championship
10	Vitória da Praia	2	0	0	0	2	1973 Championship
11	AJAC da Calheta	1	0	0	0	1	2017 Championship
=	Benfica de Santa Cruz	1	0	0	0	1	2011 Championship
=	Beira Mar	1	0	0	0	1	2015 Championship
=	Desportivo de Santa Cruz	1	0	0	0	1	2002 Championship
=	Flor Jovem da Calheta	1	0	0	0	1	2005 Championship
=	Grémio Nhágar	1	0	0	0	1	2014 Championship
=	Varandinha	1	0	0	0	1	2016 Championship
=	GDRC Delta	0	1	0	0	1	2016 Cup

===== South Zone =====
	Club	Championship	Cup	Super Cup	Association Cup	Total	Last Trophy
1	Sporting Clube da Praia	10	4	2	2	18	2018 Cup
2	Boavista Praia	2	4	1	1	8	2014 Super Cup
3	Desportivo da Praia	1	0	0	2	3	2016 Championship
=	ADESBA	0	2	1	0	3	2012 Super Cup
5	Travadores	1	1	0	0	2	2014 Cup
=	Académica da Praia	2	1	0	0	3	2018 Championship
7	GDRC Delta	0	1	0	0	1	2016 Cup

==== Santo Antão ====
Since 2003, the island competitions are divided into two Zones. Its lists both the totals and the two zones from 2003, the Santo Antão Cup totals is with other regional titles of each zone.

===== Total =====
	Club	Championship	Cup	Super Cup	Tournament	Total	Last Trophy
1	Académica do Porto Novo	13	11	6	6	36	2018 Cup
2	Paulense	7	3	4	5	19	2017 Championship
3	Solpontense	9	1	0	1	11	2013 Championship
4	Rosariense	5	4	1	0	10	2018 Cup
5	Sporting Porto Novo	3	1	1	3	8	2010 Super Cup
=	Marítimo Porto Novo	2	3	1	0	6	2010 Cup
7	Os Foguetões	2	0	0	3	5	2018 Championship
8	Sinagoga	1	2	1	1	5	2016 Super Cup
9	Beira-Mar	1	1	0	0	2	2009 Cup
=	Sanjoanense Ribeira das Pratas	1	1	0	0	2	2005 Cup
=	Fiorentina	1	0	0	0	1	2008 Championship
=	Lajedos	0	1	0	0	1	2016 single Cup
=	Inter Porto Novo	0	0	1	0	1	2010 Super Cup

===== North Zone =====
	Club	Championship	Cup	Super Cup	Tournament	Total	Last Trophy
1	Paulense	7	3	4	5	19	2017 Championship
2	Solpontense	7	1	0	1	9	2013 Championship
3	Rosariense Clube	3	3	1	0	7	2018 Cup
4	Os Foguetões	2	0	0	3	5	2018 Championship
5	Sinagoga	1	2	1	1	5	2016 Super Cup
6	Beira-Mar	1	1	0	0	2	2009 Cup

===== South Zone =====
	Club	Championship	Cup	Super Cup	Tournament	Total	Last Trophy
1	Académica do Porto Novo	12	11	4	6	33	2018 Cup
2	Sporting Porto Novo	3	1	1	3	8	2010 Super Cup
3	Marítimo Porto Novo	2	1	3	0	6	2010 Cup
4	Sanjoanense Ribeira das Pratas	1	1	0	0	2	2005 Cup
5	Fiorentina	1	0	0	0	1	2008 Championship
=	Inter Porto Novo	0	0	1	0	1	2010 Super Cup

==== São Nicolau ====
	Club	Championship	Cup	Super Cup	Tournament	Total	Last Trophy
1	FC Ultramarina	12	4	6	3	25	2018 Cup
2	SC Atlético	14	2	3	3	22	2017 Tournament
3	Belo Horizonte	1	3	1	3	8	2018 Championship
=	Desportivo Ribeira Brava	5	1	1	0	6	2011 Cup
5	AJAT'SN	0	2	0	0	2	2016 Cup
6	Talho	0	1	0	1	2	2010 Cup

==== São Vicente ====
	Club	Championship	Cup	Super Cup	Association Cup (Note: Known as the Opening Tournament until 2007)	Trophy (Note: Known as the Champions' Cup)	Total	Last Trophy
1	CS Mindelense	50	3	5	7	1	66	2018 Championship
2	FC Derby	10	4	2	3	0	19	2017 Super Cup
3	Académica do Mindelo	10	1	1	2	0	14	2009 Cup
=	Batuque	4	6	3	1	0	14	2018 Cup
4	Amarante	4	0	0	1	0	5	2016 Association Cup
5	Falcões do Norte	0	2	1	2	0	5	2013 Super Cup
6	Castilho	2	0	0	0	0	2	1974 Championship
7	Ribeira Bote	0	1	0	0	0	1	2003 Cup
=	Salamansa	0	1	0	0	0	1	2016 Cup

== See also ==
- List of football clubs by competitive honours won
