= Cape Verdean Football Federation =

Governing body of association football in Cape Verde

CAF
- Founded: 1982
- FIFA affiliation: 1986
- CAF affiliation: 1986
- President: Mário Semedo (2017– Present)
- Website: http://fcf.cv/

The Cape Verdean Football Federation (Portuguese: Federação Cabo-verdiana de Futebol, FCF) is the governing body of football in Cape Verde. It was founded in 1982, affiliated to FIFA and CAF in 1986. It organizes the national football league and the national team.

The federation is headquartered in the capital city of Praia and is located on Avenida Cidade de Lisboa in the subdivision of Várzea where the sport complexes are located.

Its office is just south of Estádio da Várzea and features a small field on the east part. The building was completed in 2006 after the nearby stadium was also repaired. Since 2013, the Caixa building is adjacent to its offices.

== Premier League or Interisland league ==
The Capeverdean Premier division are made up of two groups, Groups A and B and the team with the most points in the island but Santiago and Santo Antão are divided into two zones in the island qualifies into the premier division and not the top teams from the second or third divisions in other places. There are only about five to six rounds before heading to the playoffs and are played in the months of May or June.

The premier league as well as the island divisions has several teams, more teams can be seen at another title below this one:

- Cutelin dos Mosteiros Trás - Fogo
- Nô Pintcha Mosteiros - Fogo
- Grito Povo de Ribeira do Ilheu - Fogo
- ABC de Patim - Fogo
- Académica (Praia) - Praia
- Académica (Mindelo) - Mindelo
- Académica Sal-Rei - Sal-Rei
- Académico do Aeroporto - Espargos on Sal Island
- Académica (Espargos) - Espargos on Sal Island
- Académico Sal Rei - Sal Rei on Boa Vista Island
- GD Amarantes
- Barreirense
- África Show - Boa Vista
- SC Atlético
- Botafogo
- Castilho - Mindelo
- Derby FC - Mindelo
- Juventude - Fogo
- CS Mindelense - Mindelo
- No Pintcha - Brava
- Onze Unidos - Vila do Maio
- Paulense - Santo Antão (Paul)
- Rosariense - Santo Antão (Ribeira Grande)
- Sal-Rei - Sal Rei
- Sanjoanense?
- Solpontense - Santo Antão (Ponta do Sol)
- Sport Club Santa Maria - Santa Maria in the island of Sal
- Spartak d'Aguadinha - Fogo
- Sporting Clube do Porto Novo - Porto Novo
- Sporting Praia - Praia
- Tchadense - Praia
- CD Travadores - Praia
- UD Santo Crucifixo - Santo Antão (Coculi)
- Ultramarina - São Nicolau
- União - Fogo
- Unidos do Norte - Paiol, Ponta d'Água Achada São Filipe, Praia
- Verdun
- Vulcânicos - Fogo

== Island Leagues including the two zones of Santiago and Santo Antão ==
Unlike other leagues throughout the world in which is the second, third and fourth, the lowest is mainly the second division or secondary leagues and are split into ten leagues of which are played in the nine main islands, Santiago and Santo Antão is split into two, the North Zone and the South Zone; the tenth main island of Santa Luzia is uninhabited. The team of each league with the most points qualifies and advances into the premier division. One of these examples includes these islands and zones. In the 2005-06 season, the Santiago North Zone did not have a champion which meant that the champion of the previous season automatically entered the premier division:

- Boa Vista:
  - Académica Sal-Rei, Académica Operária, África Show, Sal-Rei
- Brava:
  - Académica, Benfica, Corôa, Morabeza, No Pintcha, Sporting
- Fogo:
  - ABC, Cutelinho, Juventude, No Pintcha do Mosteiros, Spartak, União, Vulcânicos
- Maio:
  - Barreirense?, Onze Unidos
- Sal
  - Académico do Aeroporto, Académica (Espargos), Juventude, Palmeira, Santa Maria, Verdun
- São Nicolau:
  - SC Atletico, FC Ultramarina, Desportivo Ribeira Brava
- Santiago (South Zone):
  - Académica, Boavista, Praia Rural, Sporting Praia, Tchadense, CD Travadores, FC Ultramarina, etc.
- Santo Antão (South Zone):
  - Sporting Clube do Porto Novo
- Santo Antão (North Zone):
  - Rosariense (Ribeira Grande), Paulense (Paul), Solpontense (Ponta do Sol), UD Santo Crucifixo (Coculi), Foguetões (Eito), Beira-Mar (Bairro do Tarrafal, Ribeira Grande), Torreense (Xoxo)
- São Vicente:
  - Académica (Mindelo), Castilho, FC Derby, CS Mindelense, etc.

The island divisions including the two islands' two zones varies from each month that play and plays in the month of April and May and May in most islands, Santiago begins from December until May.
