= Santo Antão North Opening Tournament =

Cape Verdean football tournament

- Founded: 2003
- Region: Paul and Ribeira Grande in Santo Antão, Cape Verde
- Teams: 10; 6 in the Premier Division; 4 in the Second Division
- Current champions: CD Sinagoga (1st time)
- Most championships: Paulense

The Santo Antão North (Zone) Opening Tournament (Portuguese: Torneio de Abertura de Zona Norte de Santo Antão, Capeverdean Crioulo, ALUPEC or ALUPEK: Turnéu di Abertura di Zona Sul di Santo Anton) was an opening tournament. (equivalent to a league cup) played during the season in the northern part of Santo Antão Island (consisting of the municipalities of Paul and Ribeira Grande, Cape Verde. The opening tournament was organized by the Santo Antão North Regional Football Association (ARFNSA).

== History ==
The first competition was held in 2003 and had only a single division until 2012. After the creation of the second division in 2013, for three seasons, it also had the Second Division tournament and were the only two that had, the other being the São Vicente Association Cup.

Until 2009, it featured 9 rounds and the club met once. When the second division was introduced to the São Vicente Island League in 2009, the Opening Tournament became the Association Cup and featured two divisions. It currently consists of seven rounds, a meeting with another club once. The winner with the most points is the winner.

Some people thought that the opening tournament tended its competitions in 2015 as the Santo Antão Cup was revived in late 2015 and earlier in 2014, the creation of the Paul and Ribeira Grande local tournaments lead to the elimination of the opening tournament. Also that year, its opening tournament competitions was thought to be eliminated in the island's South Zone. It was not held due to scheduling concerns partly with the single island cup competitions

=== Title history ===
Solpontense was the first winner of the opening tournament won in 2000. Paulense was the second winner in 2003, Os Foguetões won two straight titles in 2005, Paulense won their second title in 2006, Beira-Mar won their only title in 2007, Paulense won their third in 2008, Os Foguetões won their last title in 2009, Rosariense won their only title in 2011, Paulense won three consecutive titles in 2014, Sinagoga was the last winner won in 2015.

Paulense won the most titles numbering six, Foguetões is second with three and Solpontense, Beira-Mar, Rosariense and Sinagoga with a title each. Approximately 40% of the titles won was Paulense, about 20% by Foguetoes.

== Winners ==
=== Premier Division ===
Season	Winner	Runner-up
1999-2000	Solpontense	
2001 to 2002	not held	
2002-03	Paulense	
2003-04	Os Foguetões	
2004-05	Os Foguetões	
2005-06	Paulense	
2006-07	Beira-Mar	
2007-08	Paulense	
2008-09	Os Foguetões	
2009-10	not held	
2010-11	Rosariense	
2011-12	Paulense	
2012-13	Paulense	
2013-14	Paulense	
2014-15	CD Sinagoga	

==== Performance By Club ====
Club	Winners	Winning years
Paulense	6	2003, 2006, 2008, 2012, 2013, 2014
Os Foguetões	3	2004, 2005, 2009
Beira-Mar	1	2007
Rosariense	1	2011
CD Sinagoga	1	2015
Solpontense	1	2000

=== Performance by municipality ===
Municipality	Winners	Club location	Winners	Winning years
Ribeira Grande	4	Ponta do Sol	1	2000
Ribeira Grande	4	Ribeira Grande	2	2007, 2011
Ribeira Grande	4	Sinagoga	1	2015
Paul	9	Eito	3	2004, 2005, 2009
Paul	9	Pombas	6	2003, 2006, 2008, 2012, 2013, 2014

== See also ==
- Santo Antão North Premier Division
- Santo Antão North Cup
- Sports in Santo Antão, Cape Verde
