= Santo Antão North Cup =

- Founded: 2005
- Region: Paul and Ribeira Grande in Santo Antão, Cape Verde
- Current champions: Paulense (5th time)
- Most championships: Paulense (5 times)

The Santo Antão North Cup is a regional football (soccer) cup competition played during the season in the northern part of Santo Antão Island (consisting of the municipalities of Paul and Ribeira Grande, Cape Verde. The cup tournament is organized by the Santo Antão North Regional Football Association (ARFNSA). The winner (some seasons when a winner is also a champion, a cup finalist) participates in the Santo Antão North Super Cup. For several times, the winner (or a cup finalist if a winner is also champion) participated in the Cape Verdean Cup. The first entrant was in 2007 which was Rosariense and their recent was in 2012 and was Paulense. Since 2013, there were no entrants to the national cup due to financial concerns. From the 2015 edition, the winner qualifies into the Santo Antão Super Cup, a single island cup competition challenging a club from the north.

== Title history ==
Sinagoga was the first winner won in 2005, the second was Rosariense, third was Beira-Mar, fourth was Solpontense and fifth was Paulense in 2011. In 2013, Paulense won three straight cup titles and has the most cup titles won in the North Zone. Sinagoga won their second and recent in 2014 and Paulense won two more cup titles in 2016. Rosariense became the second club to have two cup titles in 2017. Beira-Mar and Solpontense are now the only clubs who won a cup title each.

From 2006 to 2011, Ribeira Grande was the only municipality who won the most cup titles. Since 2011, Ribeira Grande has the most cup titles win and Paul is second. From April 2016-2017, the two municipalities shared the most cup titles.

The upcoming 2018 final will feature Os Foguetões and Rosariense Clube.

== Winners ==
Season	Winner	Runner-up
2004/05	CD Sinagoga	
2005/06	unknown	
2006/07	Rosariense	
2007/08	unknown	
2008/09	Beira-Mar	
2009-10	Solpontense	
2010-11	Paulense	
2011/12	Paulense	
2012/13	Paulense	
2013/14	CD Sinagoga	
2014/15	Paulense	Rosariense
2015/16	Paulense	Sinagoga
2016/17	Rosariense	Sinagoga
2017-18	Rosariense Clube	Os Foguetões

== Club performance ==
Club	Winners	Winning years
Paulense	5	2011, 2012, 2013, 2015, 2016
Rosariense	3	2007, 2017, 2018
CD Sinagoga	2	2005, 2014
Beira-Mar	1	2009
Solpontense	1	2010

=== Performance by municipality ===
Municipality	Winners	Club location	Winners	Winning years
Ribeira Grande	6	Ponta do Sol	1	2010
Ribeira Grande	6	Ribeira Grande	4	2007, 2009, 2017, 2018
Ribeira Grande	6	Sinagoga	2	2005, 2014
Paul	5	Pombas	5	2011, 2012, 2013, 2015, 2016

== See also ==
- Santo Antão Cup and Super Cup
- Santo Antão North Premier Division
- Santo Antão North Opening Tournament
