= 1965 Cape Verdean Football Championship =

Académica da Praia	FC Derby
3	2
- Date: June 1965
- Venue: Estádio da Várzea, Praia

The 1965 Cape Verdean Football Championship consisted only a single match featuring the winners from Santiago Island and São Vicente. At the time it was not a national but a provincial or a colonial event, it was also known as the 1965 Cape Verdean Provincial (rarely Colonial) Football Championship. Unlike other overseas provinces of the Portuguese Empire, neither club qualified into the 1964-65 Portuguese Cup at four rounds before the finals, that was the last time, the next edition would bring the only club to the Portuguese Cup edition, the next time that neither club qualified into the Portuguese Cup would be in 1967. Académica da Praia won their only Cape Verdean title for the season. It was their only Cape Verdean title for 53 years, their next would be a national title (as the archipelago became an independent nation in 1975) won on June 2, 2018.

The finals were broadcast on Rádio Praia, at the time Cape Verde's only radio station.

== Background ==
Académica da Praia, winner of the Santiago Island Championships for 1965 would face against FC Derby from Mindelo, winner of the São Vicente Island Championships for 1965.

The match was Académica Praia's only time into the provincials as a finals match. On the other, the match was Derby's first ever into the Cape Verdean level and the only time in the provincial era.

== Match details ==
FC Derby scored some goals. Académica Praia scored two goals in the first part of the match, they were Nhartanga and Luís Bastos, the latter scored it at the last two matches of regulation and tied it with two each. The match went into extra time, Luís Bastos scored his second goal totalling three and brought Académica Praia to win their only Cape Verdean and provincial title for the season.

1965

Académica da Praia	3-2	FC Derby
Nhartanga, Luís Bastos 90',

Estádio Municipal da Praia
Praia

1	(Portugal) [CV] Tinta
2	(Portugal) [CV] Petchas
3	(Portugal) [CV] Caló Pires
4	(Portugal) [CV] Miloy
5	(Portugal) [CV] Pompeu
6	(Portugal) [CV] Nery
7	(Portugal) [CV] Duia
8	(Portugal) [CV] Kiki
9	(Portugal) [CV] Luís Bastos
10	(Portugal) [CV] Nhartanga
11	(Portugal) [CV] Orlando

Cape Verdean (Provincial) Football
Champions
Académica da Praia
1st title

Match officials

- Assistant referees:
- Fourth official:

Match rules

- 90 minutes.
- 30 minutes of extra time if necessary.

== See also ==
- 1965 in Cape Verde
