= Santo Antão North Premier Division =

- Founded: 1997
- Region: Northeastern Santo Antão Island, Cape Verde
- Number of clubs: 6
- Promotion to: Cape Verdean Football Championship
- Relegation to: Santo Antão North Second Division
- Domestic cup(s): Ribeira Grande Cup; Ribeira Grande Super Cup
- Current champions: Paulense DC (7th time) (2016-17)
- Most championships: Paulense DC (7 times)
- Website: Official website

The Santo Antão North Premier Division is a regional championship played in Ribeira Grande and Paul (though not listed), Santo Antão Island, Cape Verde. It is organized by the Santo Antão North Regional Football Association (Associação Regional de Futebol de Zona Norte do Santo Antão, ARFZNSA). The winner of the championship plays in Cape Verdean football Championships of each season. The league was formed in 1997 and continued to play with the Santo Antão Island League until the breakup into the north and south zones in 2002.

Six clubs participate, a club with the most points participates in the national championships each season while the last placed club from the regional premier division relegates into the second division the following season.

In 2013, the main portion became the Premier Division after the Premier Division was added.

Paulense has the most island titles with six and will total seven on its entirety in late March, second is Solpontense with five, third is Rosariense with three and three clubs Beira-Mar and Foguetões and now Sinagoga with only one title.

== Santo Antão North Premier Division- Clubs 2017/18 ==
- Beira Mar - Ribeira Grande
- Foguetões - Eito
- Paulense - Paul
- Rosariense - Ribeira Grande
- Santo Crucifixo - covering the parish, based in Coculi
- Sinagoga

== Winners ==
=== Regional championships (1997-2012) ===
- 1997/98 : Rosariense Clube
- 1998/99 : Solpontense
- 1999/00 : Solpontense
- 2000-02 : not held as the Santo Antão Island League continued without the two zones
- 2002/03 : Paulense DC
- 2003/04 : Paulense DC
- 2004/05 : Paulense DC
- 2005/06 : Beira-Mar (Ribeira Grande)
- 2006/07 : Rosariense Clube
- 2007/08 : Solpontense
- 2008/09 : Foguetões
- 2009/10 : Solpontense
- 2010/11 : Rosariense Clube
- 2011/12 : Paulense

=== Regional Premier Division (since 2013) ===
- 2012/13 : Solpontense
- 2013/14 : Paulense
- 2014/15 : Paulense
- 2015/16 : Sinagoga
- 2016-17: Paulense
- 2017–18: Os Foguetões

=== Performance by club ===
| Club | Winners | Winning years |
|---|---|---|
| Paulense DC | 7 | 2003, 2004, 2005, 2012, 2014, 2015, 2017 |
| Solpontense Futebol Clube | 5 | 1999, 2000, 2008, 2010, 2013 |
| Rosariense Clube | 3 | 1998, 2007, 2011 |
| Os Foguetões | 2 | 2009, 2018 |
| Beira-Mar (Ribeira Grande) | 1 | 2006 |
| Sinagoga | 1 | 2016 |

=== Performance by municipality ===
| Municipality | Winners | Club location | Winners | Winning years |
|---|---|---|---|---|
| Ribeira Grande | 10 | Ponta do Sol | 5 | 1999, 2000, 2008, 2010, 2013 |
| Ribeira Grande | 10 | Ribeira Grande | 4 | 1998, 2006, 2007, 2011 |
| Ribeira Grande | 10 | Sinagoga | 1 | 2016 |
| Paul | 8 | Pombas | 7 | 2003, 2004, 2005, 2012, 2014, 2015, 2017 |
| Paul | 8 | Eito | 2 | 2009, 2018 |

== Seasons by club ==
The left indicates the participation in the North Zone and its Premier Division, inside the bracket is overall participation as one island and the North Zone.

| Seasons | Clubs |
|---|---|
| 18 (c. 35) | Paulense |
| 16 (c. 30) | Solpontense |
| 16 | Os Foguetões |
| 15 (c.. 30) | Rosariense |
| 15 | Beira Mar |
| 14 | CD Sinagoga |
| 3 | Janela |
| 2 | Irmãos Unidos, UD Santo Crucifixo |
| 1 | São Pedro Apóstolo |

== See also ==
- Sports in Santo Antão, Cape Verde
- Santo Antão North Cup
- Santo Antão North Super Cup
- Santo Antão North Opening Tournament
