= CD Beira-Mar (Ribeira Grande) =

Football club in Cape Verde

Beira-Mar Béra-Mar
- Full name: Beira-Mar Desportivo Clube
- Ground: Campo de Futebol de Tarrafal, Ribeira Grande, Cape Verde; Estádio João Serra, Ponta do Sol, Cape Verde
- Capacity: 2,000
- League: Santo Antão North Zone Premier Division
- 2016–17: 4th

Beira-Mar Desportivo Clube or Clube Desportivo Beira-Mar (Capeverdean Crioulo, ALUPEC or ALUPEK and the São Vicente Crioulo: Béra-Mar) is a football club that had played in the Premier division and plays in the Santo Antão Island League South Zone in Cape Verde. It is based in the town of Ribeira Grande in the northwestern part of the island of Santo Antão.

== History ==
The club is one of the most important formed by young players. Unlike the clubs of Maio and Tarrafal, the club is not an affiliate to Aveiro, Portugal's S.C. Beira-Mar, the logo and uniforms are different. The team won their first title in 2006 and entered for the first time in the National Division after the break-up into two island league zones, they would be placed in Group B and got only a single win and four points. Beira Mar was the fourth club from the north of the island to win a championship title and appear at the national championships.

In the early 2010s, the club suffered from financial problems and the club withdrawal reduced the number of teams in the north zone. The club was relegated in mid 2014 to the regional Second Division and played for a year there. The club was first place in the Second Division in the 2014–15 season and returned to the league, the club finished 3rd behind Paulense with 15 points and four wins, the club scored 20 goals, it was the highest in the season which was tied with Paulense.

Also, Beira-Mar won their only regional cup title in 2009 and thus achieved their only participation in the Cape Verdean Cup that season. That time, Beira-Mar was one of five clubs who had a cup title until 2012 when it became second. In 2014, the single total became third and was shared with Rosariense and Solpontense. Now in 2017, Beira-Mar is fourth and last alongside Solpontense with a single cup title.

Beira-Mar started off the new 2017–18 season with two straight losses, they scored the season's first goal in a match against Os Foguetões where they lost 2–1, the club was last place. Beira Mar made a goal with Sinagoga in their next match, then Beira Mar became fifth, followed by 1–2 over the Paulense who was losing strength in their once powerful club of the north of the island and remains to be Beira Mar's only win for the season, Beira Mar also gained a position to fifth. Beira Mar recently lost again to Os Foguetões and is five with six points. Beira Mar made a draw with Sinagoga and had six points. Beira Mar finished with the same wins, draws and 9 points with Sinagoga, Beira Mar conceded 15 goals, less than Sinagoga's.

== Stadium ==
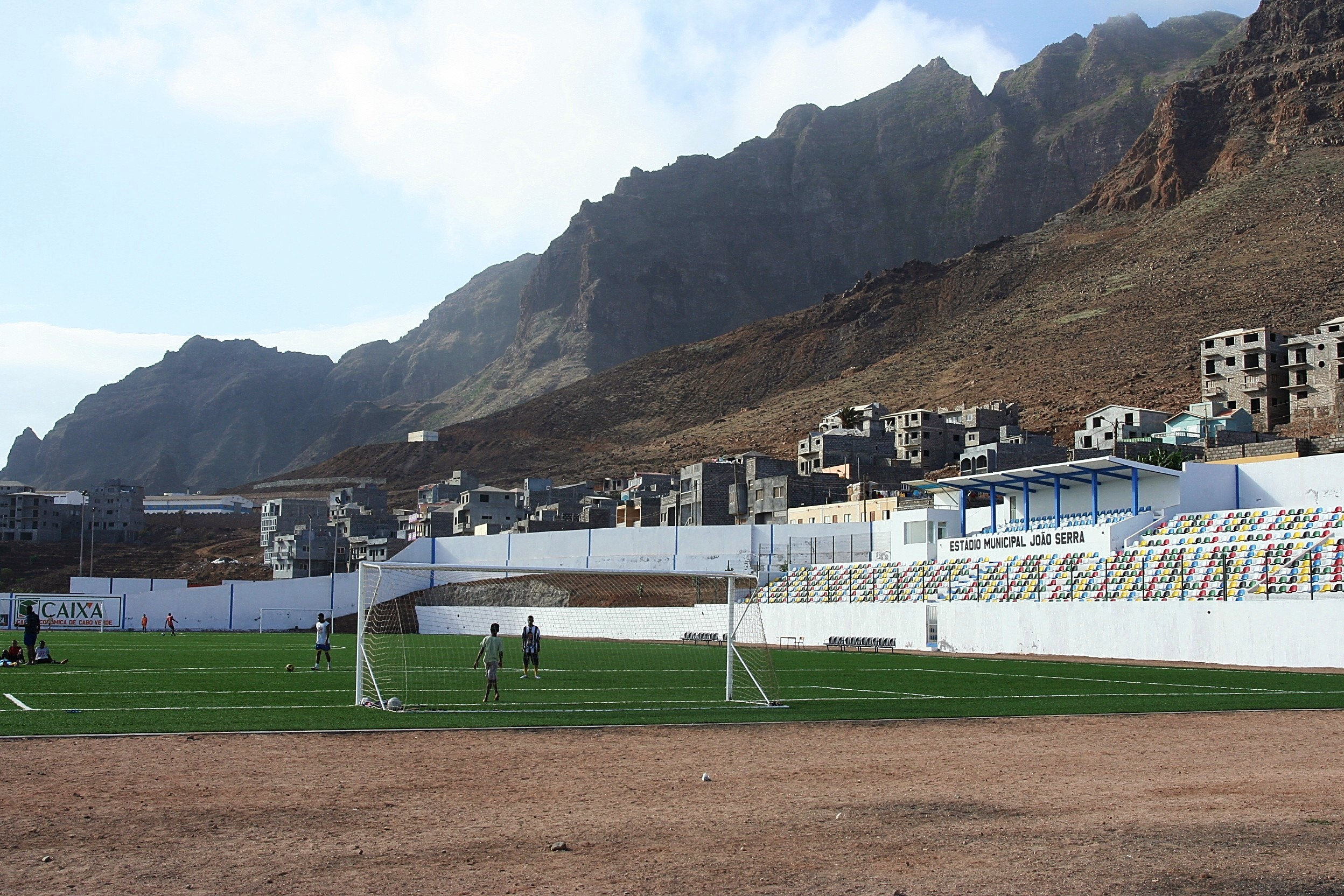
Estádio João Serra, the stadium also used by Beira Mar

Estádio João Serra is a multi-use stadium in of Ponta do Sol, Cape Verde. It is currently used mostly for football matches. The stadium holds 2,000. The stadium has seat rows in the south side and is located south of the town center. Every club of the Santo Antão Premier and Second Division including Beira Mar plays at the stadium along with Rosariense, Paulense and Os Foguetões. Also the stadium is home to Solpontense.

Their main home stadium is Campo de Futebol de Tarrafal, located northeast of the city center just south of the Atlantic which has no seats, it sits with the main road (Estrada de Vale de Paul) connecting Ribeira Grande and Porto Novo (EN1-SA01) via Janela, though Rosariense primarily trains at that field.

== Logo ==
Its logo has a similar shaped white crest with the blue tag reading "C.D. Beira Mar", a blue castle with a white colored dolphin in the middle and the club's island location in the acronym "S.A." on the bottom.

== Honours ==
- Santo Antão Island League (North): 1

2005/06

- Ribeira Grande Cup: 1

2008/09

=== Secondary honour ===
- Santo Antão North Second Division: 1

2014/15

== League and cup history ==
=== National championship ===
Season	Div.	Pos.	Pl.	W	D	L	GS	GA	GD	P	Cup	Notes	Playoffs
2006	1B	5	5	1	1	3	5	8	-3	4		Did not advance	Did not participate
Total:			5	1	1	3	5	8	-3	4			

=== Regional Championship ===
Season	Div.	Pos.	Pl.	W	D	L	GS	GA	GD	P	Cup	Tour	Notes
2005–06	2	1	-	-	-	-	-	-	-	-			Promoted into the National Championships
2013–14	2	6	10	2	1	7	14	25	-11	7			Relegated into the Second Division
2014–15	3	1	-	-	-	-	-	-	-	-			Promoted into the Premier Island Division
2015–16	2	3	10	4	3	3	20	15	+5	15			
2016–17	2	4	10	3	3	4	11	18	-7	12			
2017–18	2	5	10	2	3	5	9	15	-6	9			

== Statistics ==
- Best position: 5th – Group stage (national)
- Appearances at the championships: (national)
  - National Championships: 1
  - Regional Championships: 14
    - Appearances at the Tier 2 competition: 14
    - Appearances at the Second Division: Once, in 2013
- Appearances at the Santo Antão Cup: 2
- Total points: 4 (national)
- Total win: 1 (national)
- Total goals scored: 5 (national)
- Total draw: 1 (national)
- Total losses: 1 (national)

== See also ==
- List of football clubs in Cape Verde
- Sports in Santo Antão, Cape Verde
