= Académica da Praia =

- Full name: Associação Académica da Praia
- Nicknames: Micá, Briosa (former), Estudantes
- Founded: 15 December 1962
- Ground: Estádio da Varzea; Praia
- Capacity: 8,000
- Chairman: Kiki
- Manager: Janito Carvalho
- League: Santiago Island League (South)
- 2017–18: 1st
- Website: http://www.academicadapraia.cv/
Home colours	Away colours

Associação Académica da Praia is a football club that plays in the Premier division of the Santiago Island League (South) in Cape Verde. It is played along with Praia's three other famous teams in Estádio da Varzea, the club also practices at the stadium and over a kilometer east in Achada Grande Frente (or Leite). Its current president is Kiki and manager is Janito Carvalho who coached Sporting Praia in the previous season.

Académica Praia is one of the most successful football (soccer) club in the island of Santiago and the South Zone, having won about 11 official titles, 2 are national and the remaining 9 are regional titles. It won several championship titles before and after independence. The team never won any national championship titles since independence. It also had won five insular titles, three island cup title and a national cup title.

Académica da Praia is an affiliate of the Portuguese club Académica de Coimbra.

Its nicknames are "Mica", the short of Académica used in many of other Académica clubs around the world, "Briosa", which has recently become rarely used today and "Estudantes" which means students (students of the academy), used in several other Académica clubs elsewhere.

== History ==
The club was founded on 15 December 1962 and a few months later, it became a registered club of the Santiago Regional Football Association, at the time the only two football organizations that existed before independence.

Académica won the first upper level title in 1965 by defeating FC Derby from Mindelo 3–2 in extra time, they would win the only national title won before independence. Later, the team won the 1968 Santiago regional title at the time included other islands after beating Os Garridos a gigantic 21–0, 9 of which were scored by Luís Bastos. They challenged against Mindelense and lost 0–1 in the final round. At the time, Toka was coach for Académica Praia.

Académica Praia won their first regional cup title in 1986. Académica celebrated their 25th anniversary in 1987. Two years later, Académica won their third regional title for the island and participated at the national championships where they failed to proceed into the upper stages.

Académica finished 7th with 19th points in the 2001–02 Santiago South Premier Division, they finished a position less which was 8th in 2003 with 13 points. Académica did way better for the 2003–04 season, they won their fourth regional title, also it was their first title for the South Zone in 2004 and finished with 45 points a club record, it was also the regional and national record held it until Sporting took it in 2005 with 49, also they finished with 14 wins, its wins were a club record, in points total, it stood as a club record from 2005 until 2018.. Académica was runner-up for the next two seasons, 43 points they finished and another season with 14 wins, their third one had 39 points, as Sporting won the 2006 national title, the club entered for the 2007 nationals. For the next two seasons, they scored a total of 40 goals, in 2009, they won their recent regional title. Their positions dropped for the net few seasons in 2010, they had 30 points in 2011.

Celestino Mascarenhas was coach for the 2011–12 season, Académica Praia began with a 2–0 win over Varanda. Three days later, they celebrated its 50th anniversary in 2012. Later Académica made two additional wins to their three straight before a loss to Celtic on 15 January. Académica made a goal draw with Ribeira Grande, they suffered a 2–0 loss in their rivalry to Sporting. Académica underwent two straight wins before a 3–0 loss to Desportivo on 4 March. Académica made a goal draw with Varanda before a win over Vitória was made Académica suffered another loss, this one to Travadores 4–3 at the 12th round. Académica defeated Celtic, then lost to Ribeira Grande, an uncommon thing. Académica lost again in their rivalry to Sporting. Académica's last seasonal win was at the 16 round over Tchandense. A goal draw with Boavista was next, then a 1–3 loss to Desportivo on 27 April. Académica finished fourth for the next two seasons. In the 2012–13 season, they started with two straight wins before a repeat of a goal draw with Ribeira Grande was made, another draw of the same result was made a week later but with Varanda. Académica made a win over Boavista before a loss in their rivalry to Sporting, Académica defeated Travadores on 9 February before a goal draw with Bairro. Two suffering losses were next before a 4–1 win over Tchadense around 11. Académica defeated Ribeira Grande, a club which was losing ground in their participation Académica lost to Boavista at the 14th round. The rescheduled 13th round match was next where they defeated 1–2 over Varanda. The club suffered another loss to Sporting in their rivalry at the 15th round. Two final seasonal wins came up, the last match of the season ended in a goal draw with Desportivo.

In 2014, they finished sixth for the next two seasons and had 18 points in 2014. Académica had 27 points and 16 goals in the 2014/15 regional season, with the extended 2015/16 season, their goal total doubled to 32, the club finished fourth with 43 points, 13 wins and 4 draws. Júlio Cesar Tomar was president and Zé Piguita was the coach up to 2016.

=== Académica's new turn towards success ===
In the following season, Kiki became president and Janito Carvalho became coach who previously coached Sporting Praia. Académica da Praia started the season without a loss for some seasons, the club defeated ADESBA and made it their second first win in the first week and the first in seasons being the sole club in the number one position with three points and three goals, a goal more than Sporting Praia. Their positions dropped to second in the second round. On 11 December, they made their win over Desportivo and made a four match winning streak where their position rose from sixth to second. A loss to Travadores could not hold their second position any longer and fell to fourth at the 11th round, they gained the third position with a win over Benfica Praia at round 15 and Vitória at round 17. After their final loss of the season to Boavista, the club would be fourth for the remainder of the season and finished it with 45 points, a small success gained and tied it with their 2004 totals, a club record.

Their first round match of the 2017–18 season was to feature Varanda, as that club withdrew, they were replaced with Tira Chapéu, their recent newcomer to the second tier competition, the match has been delayed until 3 January. Académica Praia started off the season with a win over Travadores, at round 3 on 19 November, the club did the unpredictable, a win away over almighty Sporting Praia with the result 3–2 and contested to be the master of the top three clubs of the south of the island alongside Boavista Praia as well as the country, also it was their next club's win over Sporting away in under seven years. Académica Praia became third as of the third round behind Celtic da Praia and Boavista Praia and ahead of Sporting. Académica made two more wins with a score 0–2, first to the weak Ribeira Grande, then to Benfica and the club was second. Académica recently lost to the powerful Boavista 0–1 and lost a position to third, where they are as of the sixth round with 12 points and has the second most goals with ten, second behind Celtic and Sporting Praia. Académica played with their first challenge with Tira Chapéu in their rescheduled match on 3 January and won 4–0, for the first round, Académica officially started first place for the season and first place for the first few rounds. On 10 January, Académica is first place since the eighth round, they currently have 27 points and already replaced Celtic as the first place, they are ahead of Boavista and four positions ahead of almighty Sporting, it remains at the 10th round and now has 30 points. In mid-January, Lito became coach of the club, he last coached Sporting. Académica Praia now had a six match winning streak and recently defeated the newcomer Tira Chapéu and kept that club in the possibly planned relegation zone, also it has a low possibility of having the same record as Sporting did last season. Later in the season, Académica has 39 goals in total which they became second overall behind their totals made in the 2007–08 and the 2008–09 Santiago South season. At round 18, Académica made their fourth straight win as they defeated Desportivo with the low result of 1–0 but the club has finally reached into club record in points 47 and also their 15 wins, though in the region, second behind Sporting Praia's 16 wins. After defeating Eugėnio Lima at the 19th round, they had 16 wins, the most in the region, also they scored 43 goals, a new club record along with their 53 points (third behind Boavista's and Sporting's 2017 total). Four days later, with Boavista's match with Eugênio Lima ending in a draw, Académica, who has an eight-point difference over second placed Boavista became regional champions and claimed their next regional title in nine years at the 22nd round. Académica has a seven match winning streak with their last over Tchadense, after their recent match, Académica had made a new regional point record which reached 56, surpassed Sporting's 55 made last season. Overall it is third behind Scorpion Vermelho's 61 and Varandinha's 63, both from the north of the island, both made in 2015. Celtic Praia was their season's final match, their seven match winning streak and their 15 match unbeaten streak came to an end as Académica suffered another loss with the score 1–2 and shattered another record attempt. Académica Praia finished with a new regional record of 56 points, of any in the archipelago, third overall.

=== In the national competition ===
The team won their first regional title after the breakup (around fifth overall) and took part in the 2004 and was a Group B club. The first match was a three-goal draw with Fogo's Vulcânico on 8 May, then a victory came as they defeated Maio's Onze Unidos. Round 3 was their bye week, a 4–1 win over SC Santa Maria of Sal was made, the last national match ended in a 2–1 loss to São Nicolau's FC Ultramarina played at the then home field in Ribeira Brava. Académica was second. They advanced to the semis and defeated Académico do Aeroporto of Sal in two legs with a total of 4–2, 2–1 in each match, that club which qualified as the 2003 national champion. Académica made it up to the 2004 finals, it challenged against Sal-Rei FC and lost both legs, 2–0 in the first and 1–2 in the second, where all the goals were scored, Décio at the sixth minute, then a tiebreaker with Yuri at the 93rd minute and failed to win a national title.

The next two appearances succeeded as far as the semis. When they played in 2007, they placed again in Group B, the first match was a win over Fogo's Vulcânicos the same at the first round as they did three years earlier Académica Praia suffered a loss to Santo Antão North's Rosariense afterwards. Midway in the third round, no goals were scored in a match with Sal's Académico do Aeroporto. The club made two more group stage wins, where they defeated Sporting Porto Novo and Scorpion Vermelho from north of the island. Académica faced a Mindelo affiliate of Académica, no goals were scored as they would lose 1 to nil each leg. Académica returned in 2009, this time they were in Group A, their first match played on 17 May was a win over Santo Antão North's Os Foguetões, then two more wins before a two-goal draw with Sal's Santa Maria was made. Académica did not lost a match at group stage as they defeated São Vicente's most powerful club Mindelense. Académica faced Sporting Port Novo and played the first leg in Porto Novo at Estádio Amílcar Cabral which was the final match played before the opening of a new stadium to the northwest. Académica Praia scored four goals with the first by Niki at the 32nd minute. Académica played its second leg in Várzea where no goals were scored. With 4 goals over 1, they advanced into the finals and face Sporting and brought the rivalry with Sporting brought to a national level. Académica suffered a 2–0 loss to the mighty Sporting Praia, the second leg ended in a goal draw with Body scoring the only goal at the 40th minute, after Académica lost the title to Sporting. Académica's next national appearance will be in April 2018, their first in one of three groups, they will be in Group A alongside Académica affiliate from Santo Antão South, Académica do Porto Novo and Boa Vista's Sport Sal Rei Club (SSRC).

Académica da Praia was the first club to win the Cape Verdean Cup in September 2007 after defeating 3–1 over Académico do Aeroporto. Later in 2009, the club as champion of the South Zone also advanced to the single island competition, as they are now two championships of the island, the edition featured only a single match where the club, winner of the South Zone challenged with Estrela dos Amadores, winner of the North Zone for 2009, Académica Praia won their last championship of all Santiago.

== Stadium ==
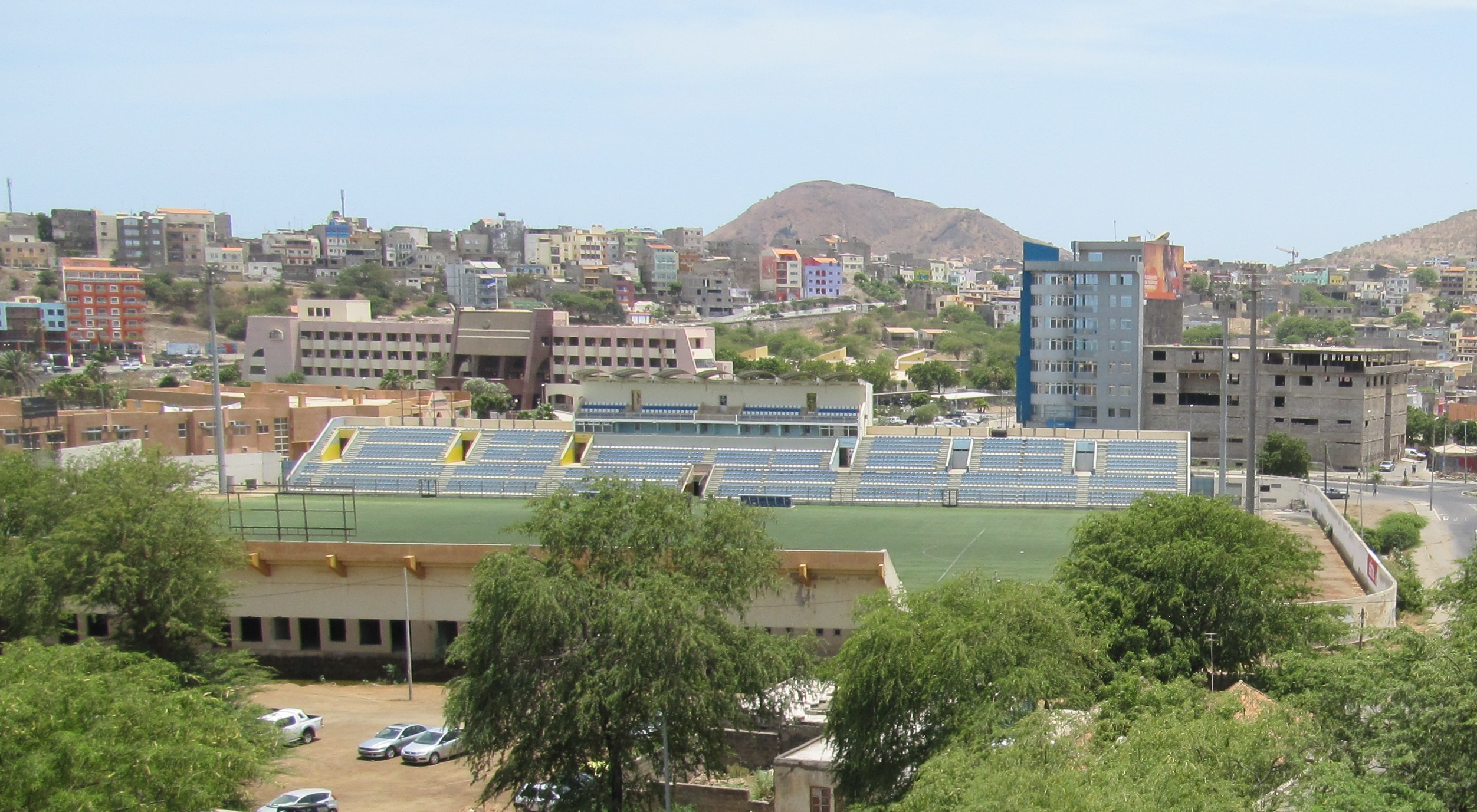
Estádio da Várzea, the home field of Académica da Praia

Estádio da Várzea is a multi-use stadium in Praia, Cape Verde. It is currently used mostly for football matches. The stadium holds 8,000. The stadium has seat rows in the left and right sides and a small hill and a plateau lies to the west.

It is played along with Praia's three other famous teams including Sporting Praia, Boavista, Desportivo Praia and CD Travadores in the same stadium. The club practices also at the stadium and at Sucupira just in the northwest corner of the intersection with Rua da Várzea.

Académica once played as Sucupira Field before 2006, in the early 2000s, as the stadium was partly disused and went under renovations, the clubs played there.

== Logo ==
Its logo is identical with Académica de Coimbra, the only difference is it has the letter P, the first letter of where the club is based.

== Uniform ==
Today's uniform has now added stripes and changed its home sock color to black.

== Rivalry ==
Their only rivalry only at the regional level is with Sporting Praia. One of them is titled Praia derby.

== Honours ==
- National titles: 3
  - Cape Verde Championship: 2

Before independence:

1965

Since independence:

2018

  - Taça Nacional de Cabo Verde: 1

2007

- Regional championship titles: 7
  - Santiago Regional League: 2

1964/65, 1967/68

  - Santiago Island League: 2

1988/89, 2009 (Note: The edition featured only a single match where a club from the North Zone challenges a club from the South Zone)

  - Santiago South Premier Division: 3

2003/04, 2008/09, 2017/18

- Regional cup titles: 3
  - Santiago Island Cup: 2

1986, 1994

  - Santiago South Zone (Praia) Cup: 1

2006/07

== League and cup history ==
=== Colonial era ===
Year	Finals	Club	Result
1965	3–2	FC Derby	Champion
1968	Lost	CS Mindelense	Finalist

=== National championship ===
Season	Div.	Pos.	Pl.	W	D	L	GS	GA	GD	P	Cup	Notes	Playoffs
2004	1B	2	4	2	1	1	7	3	+4	7		Promoted into playoffs	4th place
2007	1B	2	5	3	1	1	6	3	+3	10	Winner	Promoted into playoffs	4th place
2009	1A	1	5	4	1	0	10	5	+5	13		Promoted into playoffs	Finalist
2018	1A	1	6	3	2	1	6	4	+2	11		Advanced into the playoffs	Champion
Total:			20	12	5	3	29	15	+14	11			

=== Island/Regional Championship ===
Season	Div.	Pos.	Pl.	W	D	L	GS	GA	GD	P	Cup	Notes
2002	2	7	18	5	4	9	16	25	-9	19		
2002–03	2	8	18	3	6	9	12	21	-9	14		
2003–04	2	1	18	14	3	1	38	18	+30	45		Promoted into the National Championships
2005	2	3	17	8	5	4	26	19	+7	29		
2005–06	2	2	18	14	1	3	33	13	+20	43		
2007	2	2	18	11	6	1	25	8	+17	39	Winner	Also promoted into the National Championships
2007–08	2	3	18	9	3	6	40	26	+14	30		
2008–09	2	1	18	12	4	2	40	17	+23	40		Promoted into the National Championships
2009–10	2	3/4	18	-	-	-	-	-	-			
2010–11	2	3	18	8	6	4	24	11	+13	30		
2011–12	2	4	18	8	3	7	26	24	+2	27		
2012–13	2	4	18	8	4	6	28	22	+6	28		
2013–14	2	6	18	4	6	8	21	26	-5	18		
2014–15	2	6	18	8	3	7	16	18	-2	27		
2015–16	2	4	22	13	4	5	32	18	+14	43		
2016–17	2	4	22	13	6	3	33	19	+14	45	Round of 8	
2017–18	2	1	22	18	2	2	48	10	+38	56	Quarter-finals	Promoted to the National Division

== Statistics ==
As of the end of the 2017–18 season

- Best position: Semifinalist (national)
- Best position at a cup competition: 1st, Winner (national)
- Appearances in the national competition:
  - Total: 7
    - Colonial era: 2
    - Since independence: 5
- Appearance in a cup competition: 2 (national)
- Appearances in a regional super cup competition: 2
- Total points: 30 (national)
- Best season:
  - National (since 2004): 2009 (13 points)
  - Regional:2018 (18 wins, 56 points)
- Highest number of points in a season:
  - National: 13
  - Regional: 56, in 2018
- Highest number of goals scored in a season:
  - National: 15, in 2009
  - Regional: 48, in 2018
- Highest number of wins in a season: 18, in 2018
  - Highest number of wins at home in a season: 6/7
  - Highest number of wins away in a season: 10, in 2018
- Highest scoring match: Académica 21–0 Garridos, in 1968

== Players ==
=== Current squad ===
As of 18 December 2016

Note: Flags indicate national team as defined under FIFA eligibility rules; some limited exceptions apply. Players may hold more than one non-FIFA nationality.

No.	Pos.	Nation	Player
—			Admilson Moreno Cabral
—			Ailton Lopes Rodrigues
—	GK	CPV	Aléssio (Alexandre Varela Gonçalves)
—			Anildo (Note: Portuguese for Anild) da Costa
—	FW	CPV	Bruno Patrick dos Santos Furtado
—		CPV	Samuel Mascarenhas Cabral
—		CPV	Evandro Manuel Correia
—		CPV	Danielson Andrade
—		CPV	Daric Silva Baessa
—		CPV	Márcio Delano Varela Coreia
—		CPV	Delton Tavares
—	FW	CPV	Denane (Note: Also as Djenani) Barbosa
—	MF	CPV	Diney Samir Lopes
—			Keven Semedo Fati
—		CPV	Aires Sulivandro Fernandes

No.	Pos.	Nation	Player
—		CPV	Lenine Júnior Gonçalves
—	MF	CPV	Esmael Miranda Lopes
—		CPV	Elton Djone Marques
—		CPV	Jacquelino Mendes (Note: Also as Jaquelino Mendes)
—	DF	CPV	Mika (Mikael Marques Fernandes)
—		CPV	Victor Hugo Tavares Moreno
—			Kevin Antunes Rocha
—			Carlos Fortes Rodrigues
—	MF	GUI	Abdoulaye Silla
—			Fernando Tavares
—		CPV	Rui Filipe Faria Tavares
—	DF	CPV	Txabana (Alberto Baessa)
—		CPV	Paulo Jamir Vieira
—			Wagner Rodrigues Andrade

== Chairmen history ==
Name	Nationality	From	To
Júlio César Tomar	Cape Verde	unknown	2016
Kiki	Cape Verde	since 2016	

== Managerial history ==
Name	Nationality	From	To
Toka		around 1964	1968
Celestino Mascarenhas	Cape Verde	2011	2012/13
José Barros Zé Piguita	Cape Verde	2014	2016
Janito Carvalho	Cape Verde	2016	late 2017
Lito	Cape Verde	since January 2018	
