= Estádio João Serra =

Sports stadium in Cape Verde

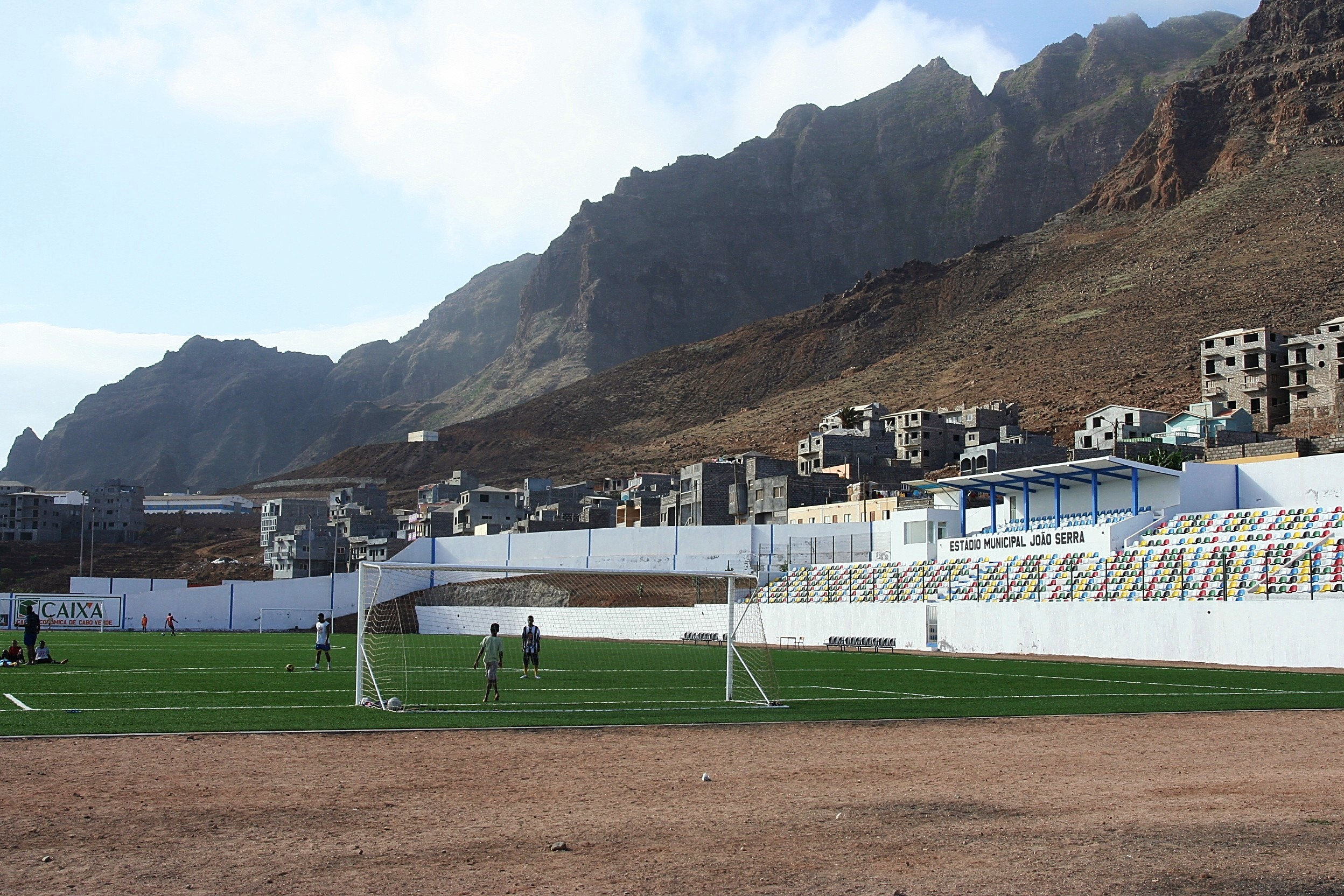

- Location within Cape Verde
- Location: Ponta do Sol, Santo Antão, Cape Verde
- Coordinates: 17.199°N 25.092°W
- Capacity: 2,000

Tenants
- Beira-Mar; Paulense; Rosariense; Solpontense

Estádio João Serra is a multi-use stadium in Santo Antão, Cape Verde. Its location is south of the urban area. It is near the foot of the island's northern mountains and is nearby a newly built urban area. The stadium is operated by the Santo Antão North Regional Football Association (ARFSAN) and has its offices there. It is currently used mostly for football matches and is the home stadium of Solpontense as well as Irmãos Unidos, other football clubs from the north of the island (members of the Santo Antão North Regional Football Association (ARFSAN or ARFNSA)) not based in the town play at the stadium including Paulense from Paul and Sinagoga located between Ribeira Grande and Paul and other parts of the two northern municipalities. The stadium holds 2,000 people. It is named for João Serra, its size is 100x65 m and its grass is artificial.

Geographically it is the northernmost sports venue in Cape Verde and one of the westernmost in the whole of Africa.

== Other events ==
Each year, the Ribeira Grande Municipal Cup takes place each year in the months of September and October.

== See also ==
- List of football stadiums in Cape Verde
- Sports in Santo Antão, Cape Verde
