= Solpontense FC =

Solpontense Solpuntensi
- Full name: Solpontense Futebol Clube
- Founded: 1990
- Ground: Estádio João Serra; Ponta do Sol, Cape Verde
- Capacity: 2.000
- Chairman: João Lopes Rodrígues
- League: Santo Antão North Zone Premier Division
- 2015–16: 6th – Relegated

Solpontense Futebol Clube (Capeverdean Crioulo, ALUPEC or ALUPEK: Solpuntensi Futibol Klubi, Santo Antão Crioulo: Solpontense Futbol Klub', São Vicente Crioulo: Solpontense Futebol Klube) is a football club that currently plays in the Santo Antão North Premier Division in Cape Verde. It is based in the town of Ponta do Sol in the northern part of the island of Santo Antão and being the country's northernmost football club. Its current manager is João Lopes Rodrígues.

Solpontense is the second most successful football (soccer) club in the North Zone and third on the island, having won about 11 official regional titles.

== Club name differences ==
Unlike the club in Madeira based in Ponta do Sol which is called Pontassolense, the club based in Ponta do Sol, Cape Verde has a different name and is titled "Solpontense" along with its inhabitants.

== History ==
The club was founded in 1990. The team is ranked second in the number of championship titles since 1997 and their first one was in 1996, their second was in 1999 after defeating Marìtimo Porto Novo of the south, their third was in 2000 after defeating Académica do Porto Novo of the south which would be two in a row. It was the last championship title of the entire island.

After winning their only cup title for the region, the club competed once in the Cape Verdean Cup in the summer of 2010. That time, Solpontense was one of five clubs who had a cup title until 2012 when it became second. In 2014, the single total became third and was shared with Rosariense and Beira-Mar. Now in 2017, Solpontense is fourth and last alongside Beira Mar with a single cup title.

Recently the club was relegated into the regional Second Division in 2016 after being last place, not a single win was made, only two draws were made and finished with only two points..

In the 2016–17 season, in October, along with Rosariense being the two best clubs in the Second Division and the withdrawal of São Pedro Apóstolo and Irmãos Unidos, the two only challenged the newcomer Torrense, based in Xoxo the middle of Ribeira da Torre, as Torreense was not a powerful team, Solpontense sought the opportunity for a chance to return to the regional Premier Division, Solpontense failed and later finish second in late March and spend the following season in the Second Division. Solpontense made their second appearance with the division, a repeat of the withdrawal of São Pedro Apóstolo and Irmãos Unidos could be the division's best club. At the fourth round, they were first place with 9 points and first at the fifth round and Solpontense and later the end of the season and next season will be returning to the Premier Division. At round 6, a scoreless draw was made with Janela, then an 0–4 victory over Torreense, the last match of the season was another scoreless draw with Janela at the ninth round.

In the regional cup, the northern part, Solpontense will start at the first round, originally it would be club who would face one of the clubs that would later withdraw at the preliminary round, instead, they advanced into the second round and faced Janela on February 3, no goals were scored and lost 5–4 in the penalty shootout.

== Stadium ==
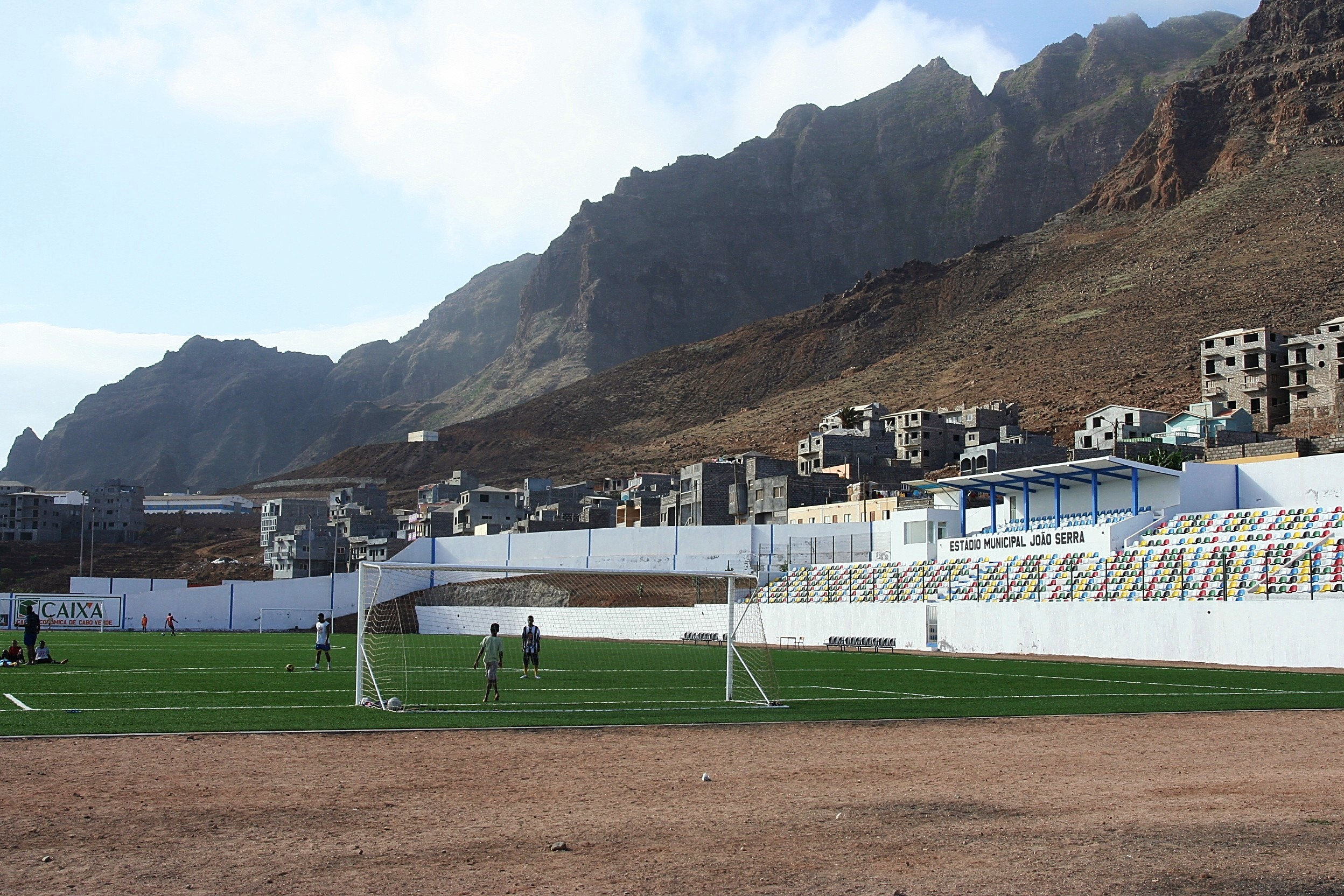
Estádio João Serra, the home stadium of Solpontense

Estádio João Serra is a multi-use stadium in of Ponta do Sol, Cape Verde. It is currently used mostly for football matches. The stadium holds 2,000. The stadium has seat rows in the south side and is located south of the town center. The stadium is home to Solpontense. Every club of the Santo Antão Premier and Second Division plays at the stadium especially clubs based outside Ponta do Sol including Rosariense, Paulense, Beira Mar and Os Foguetões.

== Logo ==
Its club logo features a striped crest with 4 black lines and 3 yellow lines. The rising sun is featured on the top hence the toponym of Ponta do Sol., the grey label reads "Solpontense" with a grey football (soccer ball) in the middle and S.F.C. on the bottom inside its three yellow lines.

== Honours ==
=== Regional ===
- Santo Antão Island League (North): 5

1998/99, 1999/00, 2007/08, 2009/10, 2012/13

- Santo Antão Island League: 4

1995/96, 1998/99, 1999/00, 2000/01

- Santo Antão North Cup: 1

2009/10

- Santo Antão Island (North) Opening Tournament: 1

1999/2000

- Secondary Achievement:
  - Santo Antão North Second Division: 1

2017/18

=== Municipal ===
- Ribeira Grande Municipal Tournament: 1

2016

== League and cup history ==
=== National championship ===
Season	Div.	Pos.	Pl.	W	D	L	GS	GA	GD	P	Cup	Notes	Playoffs
1999	1A	3	6	2	2	2	14	8	+6	8		Did not advance	Did not participate
2000	1A	3	2	0	1	1	2	3	-1	1		Did not advance	Did not participate
2001	1	4	6	2	3	1	10	8	+2	9			
2008	1B	4	5	2	0	3	5	7	-2	6		Did not advance	Did not participate
2010	1A	6	5	1	1	3	7	14	-7	4		Did not advance	Did not participate
2013	1B	4	5	1	3	1	6	6	0	6	Cancelled	Did not advance	Did not participate

=== Island/Regional Championship ===
Season	Div.	Pos.	Pl.	W	D	L	GS	GA	GD	P	Cup	Tour	Notes
2007–08	2	1	-	-	-	-	-	-	-				Promoted into the National Championships
2009–10	2	1	-	-	-	-	-	-	-	-			Promoted into the National Championships
2012–13	2	1	10	-	-	-	-	-	-	-			Promoted into the National Championships
2013–14	2	5	10	3	1	6	12	22	-10	10	Winner		Promoted into the National Championships
2014–15	2	3	10	3	4	3	9	10	-1	13			
2015–16	2	6	10	0	2	8	7	25	-18	2			
2016–17	3	2	6	3	0	3	14	8	+6	9			
2017–18	3	1	6	4	2	0	10	0	+10	14			To be promoted into the regional Premier Division

== Statistics ==
- Best position: 3rd – Group stage (national)
- Best position at cup competitions: 1st (regional)
- Appearances at the Regional Championships: 22
  - Appearances at the Tier 2 competition: 21
  - Appearance at the Second Division: 2
- Appearances at the Santo Antão Cup: 2
- Lowest position: 2nd – Second Division
