= Rosariense Desportivo Clube =

Rosariense Rozariensi Klubi
- Full name: Rosariense Clube da Ribeira Grande; Desportivo Clube
- Ground: Campo de Futebol de Tarrafal, Ribeira Grande, Cape Verde; Estádio João Serra, Ponta do Sol, Cape Verde
- Capacity: 2,000
- Chairman: Orlando de Jesus Delgado
- Manager: Artur Fortes
- League: Santo Antão Island League (North)
- 2016–17: 1st, Promoted
Home colours	Away colours

Rosariense Clube da Ribeira Grande, also as Rosariense Desportivo Clube, short or conventional form: Rosariense Clube (Capeverdean Crioulo, ALUPEC or ALUPEK: Rozariensi Klubi and the São Vicente Crioulo: Rosariense Klube) is a football club that had played in the Premier division and plays in the Santo Antão Island League South Zone in Cape Verde. It is based in the town of Ribeira Grande in the northeastern part of the island of Santo Antão. Its current chairman is Orlando de Jesus Delgado who is since September 12, 2015

Rosariense is the third most successful football (soccer) club in the North Zone having won about 5 official regional titles, overall it is fourth with the South Zone's Sporting Porto Novo with 8 official regional and subregional titles combined.

== History ==
After the creation of the island's regional competition around the 1980s, the club won their first title in 1989, they won their second two years later. In 1995, Rosariense won two back to back titles. Up to the creation of the North Zone competition, the club participated four times at the national championships and did not succeed, not even in group stage in the two later seasons.

It was the first team ever to win the title after breaking the island's division zones into two and the team won in 1998. For only a year, the team only had one title with Beira Mar, its teams' recent win in 2007 now made it having two titles with Solpontense.

Rosariense's recent appearance was the 2011 Cape Verdean Football Championships and was placed in Group B, the club played four matches, one short as the Brava Island season was cancelled, the team was last place and had no wins and had a draw and three losses, four goals were scored and the club conceded 14 goals and won a point, its worst defeat ever was the match with Boavista FC at Praia which lost 6–0 on June 11 at the fifth and final round of the championships.

The club was ranked sixth and last in the 2014–15 season and was relegated, for the next two seasons, Rosariense was in the Second Division. In the 2016–17 season, along with Solpontense being the best two clubs of the Second Division along with the withdrawal of São Pedro Apóstolo and Irmãos Unidos, the two only challenged the newcomer Torrense, based in Xoxo the middle of Ribeira da Torre, as Torreense was not a powerful team, Rosariense sought the opportunity for a chance to return to the regional Premier Division and three weeks before the end of the Second Division on February 19, Rosariense was listed winner of the Regional Second Division for the season and was promoted in the following season.

Rosariense had two straight wins in the new 2017–18 season with 6 points and 7 goals scored before a loss to Os Foguetões. They were first in the first two rounds. In just a few seasons, they are in the top two positions and are now in a higher position than Paulense, as well as the island's top five clubs overall. A draw with Beira Mar occurred at the 6th round followed by a 0–3 win over Paulense keeping that club in the relegation zone and at round 6, remains first with 16 points. Rosariense made a scoreless draw with Os Foguetões, their first position was taken by Santo Crucifixo. Rosariense was third at the ninth round. The season's final challenge was with Sinagoga, it ended in a three-goal draw and also Rosariense did not win another championship title, they finished second behind Os Foguetões.

=== Other competitions ===
Rosariense was one of the few teams to qualify into both national competitions, the other was the cup. After winning their first North Zone's cup title in 2007, they also participated in the Cape Verdean Cup. The club in the 2015 North Zone's cup reached to the final and lost to Paulense, as Paulense was also champions that season, Rosariense went to the North Zone's super cup and lost to Paulense. In the 2017 North Zone's cup which took place on April 17, they made it to the finals and won their recent title, their next in ten years after defeating Sinagoga 4–3 in the penalty shootouts as the match ended in a draw. Along with Sinagoga, Rosariense has the second most cup titles in the North Zone. Rosariense made another appearance in the 2018 regional cup, in the semis, they defeated Janela 4–2 and will proceed to the finals and face Os Foguetões on March 24. Os Foguetões which became national champions on March 18, Rosariense achieved entry into the super cup later in the year without status until after the cup final.

At the 2017 Santo Antão Cup, the club recently made it to the finals and faced Académica Porto Novo on April 1. Rosariense withdrew from the competition and the island cup may have been rescheduled.

Rosariense achieved entry into the Santo Antão North Super Cup, this time as cup winner. The club would be the seventh club to compete at the Santo Antão Super Cup later on November 25, 2017, but the single island cup and super cup competitions were canceled once again since 2008. Rosariense faced Paulense and this time, a different direction, the club defeated Paulense 0–3 and won their only super cup title for the north of the island.

In municipal competitions, Rosariense won the 2012, 2013 and 2015 Ribeira Grande Municipal Tournament titles. Rosariense recently played in the municipal 2018 Ribeira Grande Municipal Tournament, they finished first with 7 goals scored and 4 points, their point total was shared with Beira Mar. Their greatest match was a 6–0 win over the newest club Torreense played in the second day of the tournament which was on January 13. Rosariense won the local title for the season.

== Stadium ==
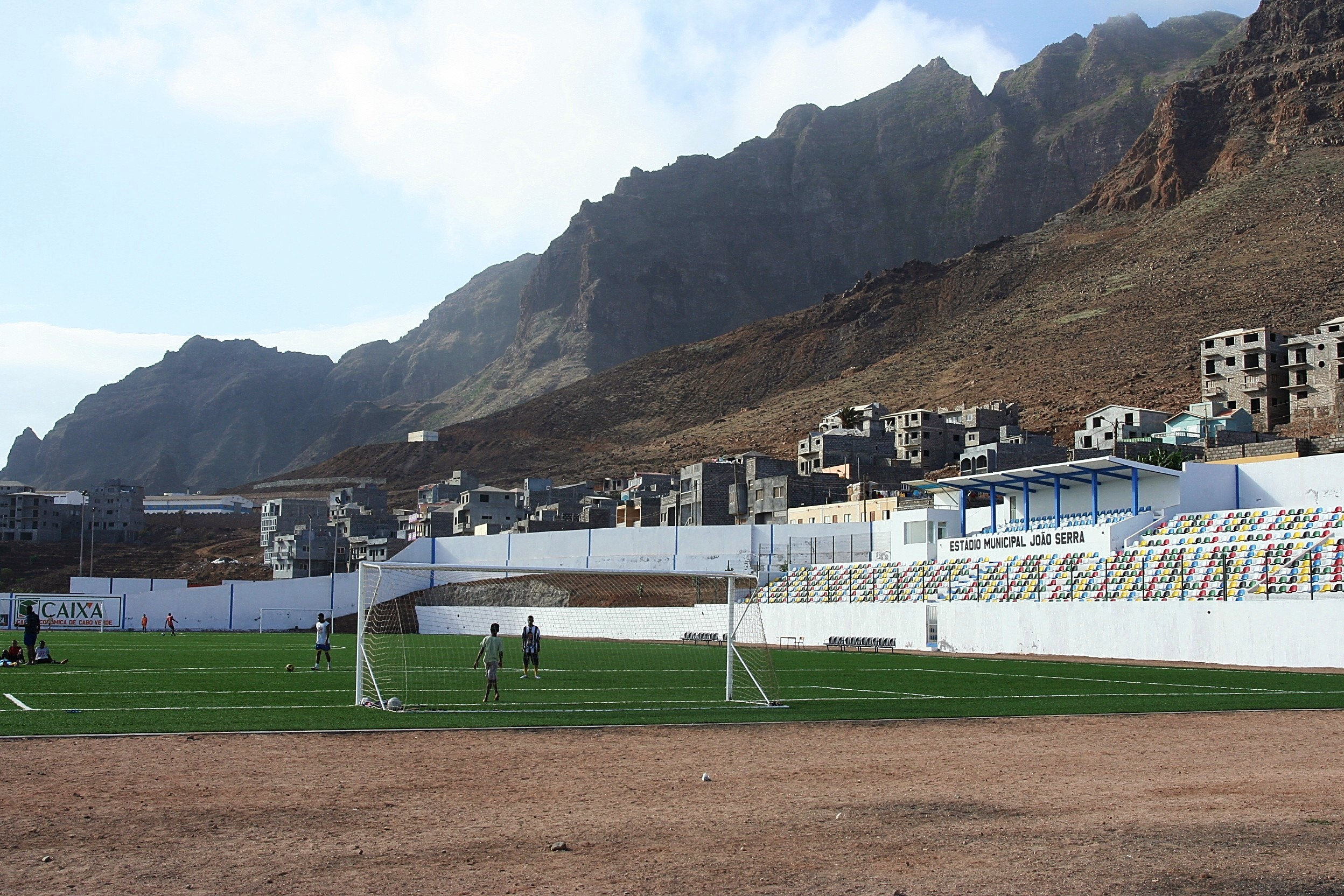
Estádio João Serra, the stadium also used by Rosariense

Estádio João Serra is a multi-use stadium in of Ponta do Sol, Cape Verde. It is currently used mostly for football matches. The stadium holds 2,000. The stadium has seat rows in the south side and is located south of the town center. Every club of the Santo Antão Premier and Second Division including Rosariense plays at the stadium along with Paulense, Beira Mar and Os Foguetões. Also the stadium is home to Solpontense.

Their main home stadium is Campo de Futebol de Tarrafal, located northeast of the city center just south of the Atlantic which has no seats, it sits with the main road (Estrada de Vale de Paul) connecting Ribeira Grande and Porto Novo (EN1-SA01) via Janela, though Rosariense primarily trains at that field.

== Logo and uniform ==
Its club logo features a shield-crest with black and white stripes on top with a gold colored circular rim with a crown on top with the huge R in the middle, the D on the bottom and the G on the right.

Its uniform colours has a black-white striped T-shirt with five black stripes and its sleeved striped for home games and a white T-shirt for away games, the rest of the clothing are black for both home and away games.

== Honours ==
- Regional Championships: 7
  - Santo Antão Island League: 4

1988/89, 1990/91, 1993/94, 1994/95

  - Santo Antão Island League (North): 3

1997/98, 2006/07, 2010/11

  - Santo Antão North Cup: 2

2006/07, 2016/17

  - Santo Antão North Super Cup: 1

2016/17

=== Secondary achievement ===
  - Santo Antão North Zone Second Division: 1

2016/17

=== Other achievements ===
- Municipal: 4
  - Ribeira Grande Municipal Tournament: 4 listed

2012, 2013, 2015, 2018

== League and cup history ==
=== National championship ===
Season	Div.	Pos.	Pl.	W	D	L	GS	GA	GD	P	Cup	Notes	Playoffs
2007	1B	4	5	2	1	2	5	3	+3	7		Did not advance	Did not participated
2011	1B	5	4	0	1	3	4	14	10	1		Did not advance	Did not participated

=== Island/Regional Championship ===
Season	Div.	Pos.	Pl.	W	D	L	GS	GA	GD	P	Santo Antão North Cup	Santo Antāo Cup	Tour	Notes
2006–07	2	1	-	-	-	-	-	-	-	-	Winner	Winner		Promoted into the National Championships
2010–11	2	1	-	-	-	-	-	-	-	-				Promoted into the National Championships
2013–14	2	2	10	6	3	1	24	11	+13	21				
2014–15	2	6	10	1	2	7	10	16	-6	5	Finalist			
2015–16	3	2	8	4	1	3	26	15	+11	13			Not held	
2016–17	3	1	6	6	0	0	13	3	+10	18	Winner	Finalist	Not held	
2017–18	2	2	10	5	4	1	17	7	+10	19	Winner	Unknown	Not held	

== Statistics ==
- Best position at cup competitions: 1st (regional)
- Appearances: (national)
  - National: 6
  - Regional Championships: 24/25
    - Appearances at the Tier 2 competition: 22/23
    - Appearances at the Second Division: 2
- Appearances at the Santo Antão Cup: 3
- Highest number of points in a season: 7 (national), in 2007
- Lowest position: 2nd – Second Division
- Lowest number of goals scored in a season: 3 (national), in 2007
- Lowest number of points in a season: 1 (national), in 2011
- Highest number of goals conceded in a season: 14 (national), 2011
- Highest number of matches lost in a season: 3 (national), 2011
- Worst defeat at the National Championships: Boavista 6–0 Rosariense, 11 June 2011
