= CD Os Foguetões =

Football club in Cape Verde

Foguetões Fogetonis or Fogetois
- Full name: Clube Desportivo Os Foguetões
- Ground: Paúl and Eito, Cape Verde
- League: Santo Antão Island League (North)
- 2016–17: 5th

Clube Desportivo Os Foguetões (Capeverdean Crioulo, ALUPEC or ALUPEK: Fogetonys or Fogetois, also in the São Vicente Crioulo) is a football club that had played in the Premier division and plays in the Santo Antão Island League South Zone in Cape Verde. It is based in the settlement of Eito in Paul in the northeastern part of the island of Santo Antão.

== History ==
The club won only one title in the regional championships which was in 2009. Latter on May 17, they headed to the national level and was in Group A, The club first played with Santiago South champ Académica da Praia and lost 0–1. No successes Os Foguetões has made as all of its matches were unvictorious. Another loss suffered to Onze Unidos in the next round which was played in Maio, midway, a three goal draw was made with Sal's Santa Maria Two more losses followed, a huge 6–0 loss to Mindelense, played in the adjacent island of São Vicente and became the most sufferable loss at the nationals, the last one was to FC Ultramarina of São Nicolau played at Ponta do Sol. The club finished last in the group, overall ahead of Boa Vista's Académica Operária.

The club started fourth and then into the relegation zone until a win over Janela 1–2 on February 12, the sixth round and put that club in the relegation zone for the rest of the season, the club was fourth and from March 19, fifth place for the remainder of the season after a loss to Beira-Mar 1–2. In the 2017 North Zone Cup, the club managed to reach the semis and lost to Rosariense.

Foguetões started off moderately for the 2017–18 season and made the season's first win over Beira Mar on December 17, as Paulense had no losses, they contested to be the best club in Paul and a chance for another championship title. Their first match of this year, 2018, another win was made, a 1–0 win over Rosariense, their recent win, a 2–1 win over Paulense and has become historically the municipality's second best team, they were third, better than a few seasons., and may have chance for another championship title waiting with only a three point difference with first placed Rosariense. At the fifth round, they are still third, their recent win was 0–1 over Beira Mar and had 15 points and their recent draw was no goals with Rosariense and has 16 points. At the final round Os Foguetões defeated Paulense 1–3, a club who was once the powerful team of the north and the club threw them out of the Premier Division in its entirety. Os Foguetões finished with 22 points and also claimed their next regional championship title in nine years, the only under the format of the Premier Division. Also their two title totals became fourth since the late-2002 division of the island championships into north and south competitions. The national championships awaits for Os Foguetões and will be in Group B, two other participants will be CD Scorpion Vermelho of Santiago North and Belo Horizonte of São Nicolau.

Os Foguetões appeared in the 2018 regional cup final with Rosariense which they lost on March 24. Os Foguetões will be one of the two clubs to play in the 2018 regional super cup and will only qualify as regional champions.

=== Other regional competitions ===
The club also won three opening tournament titles, their first two consecutive titles in 2004 and their last in 2009.

== Logo and uniform ==
Its logo has a blue shield with two palm trees inside a circle and a football (or a soccer ball). Its uniform clothing colors are blue and white.

== Stadium ==
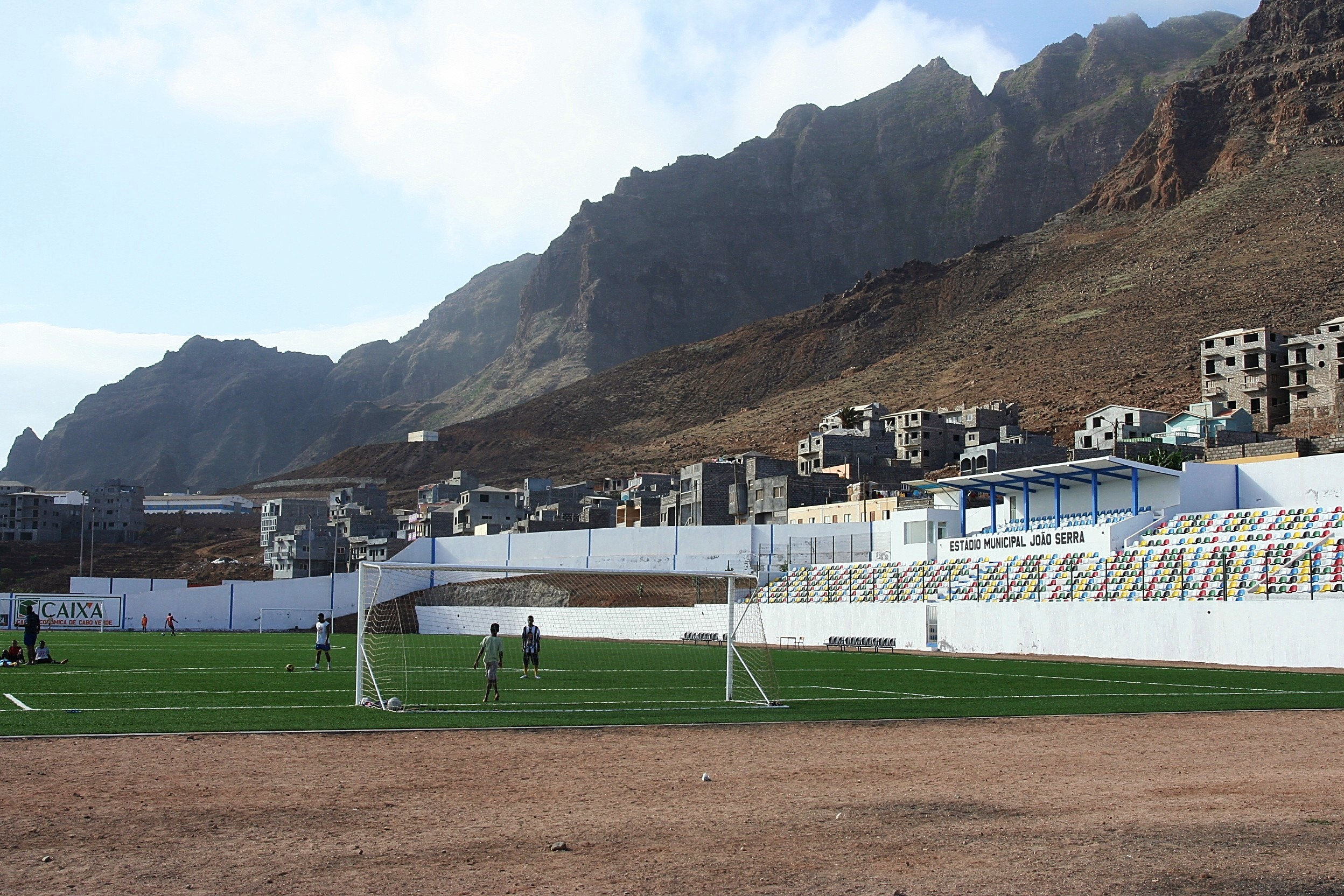
Estádio João Serra, the stadium also used by Os Foguetões

Estádio João Serra is a multi-use stadium in of Ponta do Sol, Cape Verde. It is currently used mostly for football matches. The stadium holds 2,000. The stadium has seat rows in the south side and is located south of the town center. Every club of the Santo Antão Premier and Second Division including Os Foguetões plays at the stadium along with Os Foguetões include Rosariense, Paulense, Beira Mar and Janela. Also the stadium is home to Solpontense.

As the upper part of Vale de Paul has no football field but a local basketball court outside Eito, their main home stadium is Campo de Coqueiral, located in the city center just west of the Atlantic which has no seats, it sits with the main road (Estrada de Vale de Paul) connecting Ribeira Grande and Porto Novo (EN1-SA01) via Janela, though primarily trains at that field.

== Honours ==
- Santo Antão North Regional Championships/Premier Division: 2

2008/09, 2017/18

- Santo Antão Island (North) Opening Tournament: 3

2003/04, 2004/05, 2008/09

== League and cup history ==
=== National championship ===
Season	Div.	Pos.	Pl.	W	D	L	GS	GA	GD	P	Cup	Notes	Playoffs
2009	1A	6	5	0	1	4	3	15	-12	1		Did not advance	Did not participated
2018	1B	1	6	2	3	1	8	6	+2	9		Advanced into the playoffs	Semifinalist
Total:			11	2	4	5	11	21	-10	10			

=== Regional Championship ===
Season	Div.	Pos.	Pl.	W	D	L	GS	GA	GD	P	Cup	Tour	Notes
2008–09	2	1	11	10	1	0	24	7	+17	31			Promoted into the National Championships
2013–14	2	4	10	3	3	4	10	12	-2	12			
2014–15	2	5	10	2	4	4	5	7	-2	10			
2015–16	2	4	10	2	3	5	13	19	-7	8		Not held	
2016–17	2	5	10	2	3	3	16	19	-7	9		Not held	
2017–18	2	1	10	7	1	2	14	8	+9	22	Finalist	Not held	Promoted into the National Championships

== Statistics ==
- Best position: Semifinalist (national)
- Best position at cup competitions: Finalist
- Appearances at the championships: (national)
  - National Championships: 2
  - Regional Championships: 15
- Appearances at the Santo Antão Cup: 2
- Total goals scored: 12 (national)
- Total points: 10 (national)
- Total matches played at the National Championships: 13
  - Total matches played at home: 7
  - Total matches played away: 6
- Total wins at the National Championships: 2
- Total draws at the National Championships: 4
- Total losses at the National Championships: 5
- Total goals conceded at the National Championships: 21
