= Ponta do Sol, Cape Verde =

Ponta do Sol
- Settlement
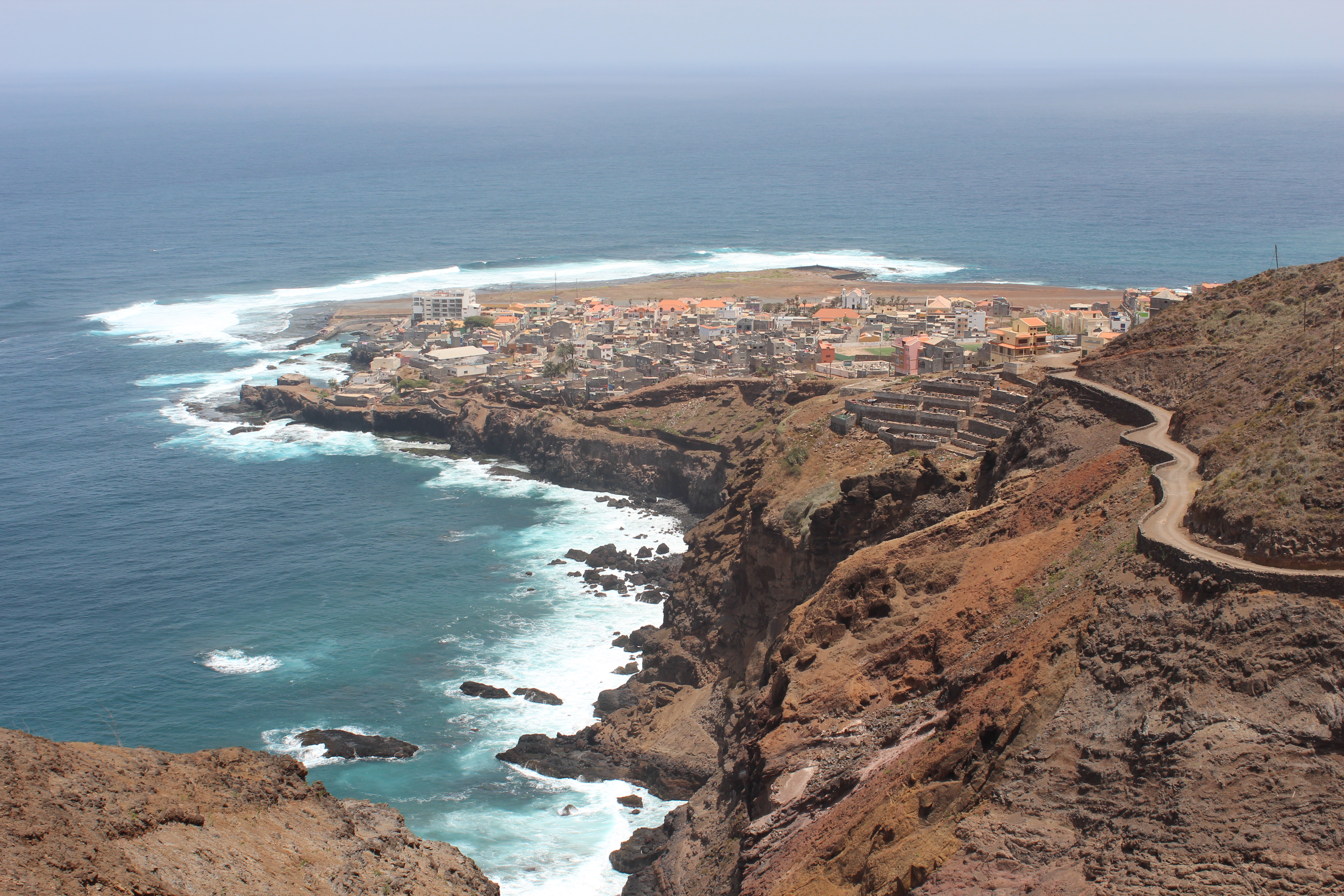
- View of Ponta do Sol

- Location within Cape Verde
- Coordinates: 17.202°N 25.093°W
- Country: Cape Verde
- Island: Santo Antão
- Municipality: Ribeira Grande
- Civil parish: Nossa Senhora do Livramento
- Elevation: 49 m (161 ft)

Population (2010)
  - Total: 2,143
- Postal code: 1120
- ID: 11202

Ponta do Sol (formerly: Vila Dona Maria Pia) is the northernmost city on the island of Santo Antão and Cape Verde. It is situated on the coast, 4 km northwest of Ribeira Grande and 20 km north of the island capital Porto Novo. It is the seat of Ribeira Grande municipality.

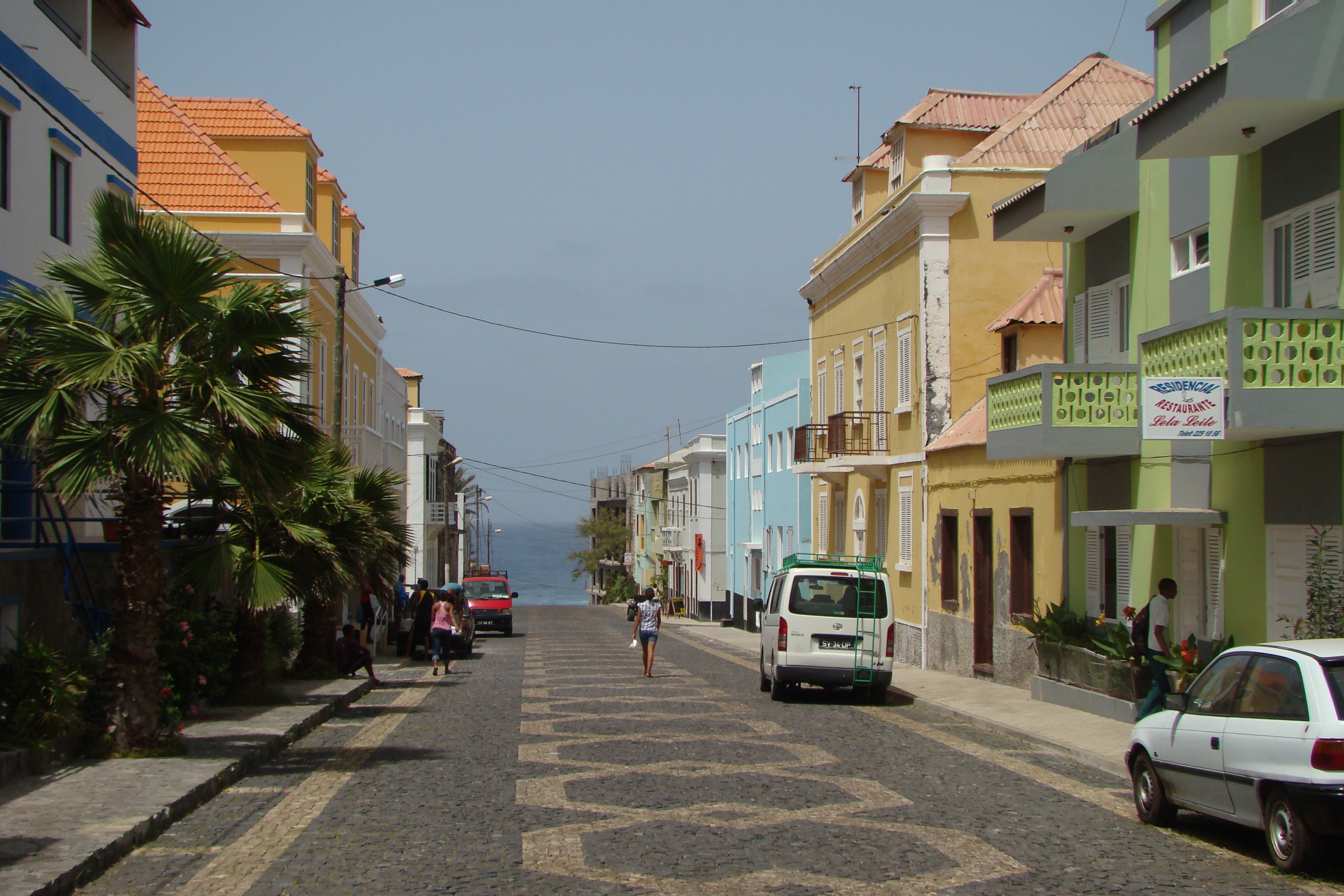
Center of Ponta do Sol

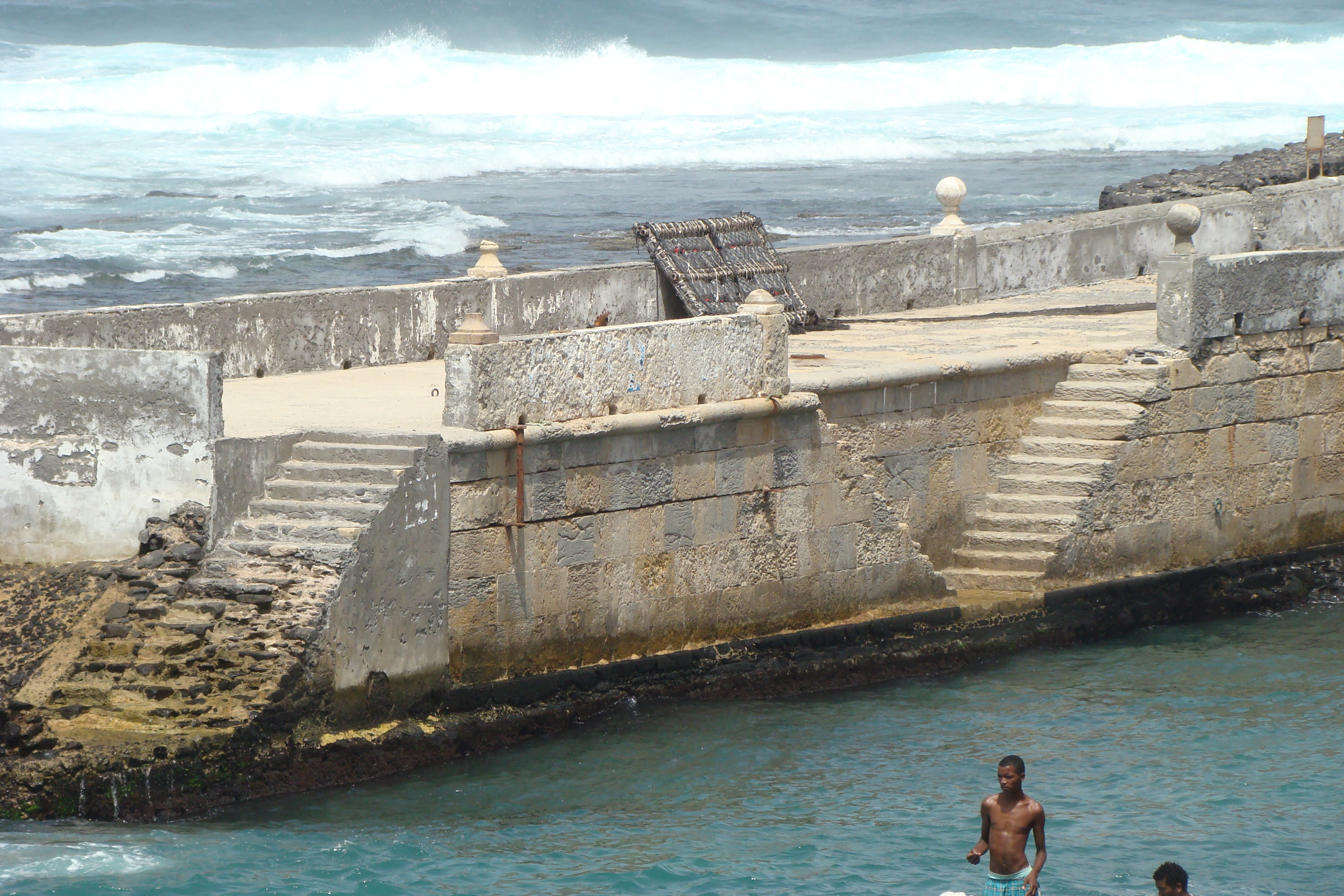
The fishing port of Ponta do Sol

Ponta do Sol is divided into the neighbourhoods Casinhas, Cavouquinho das Tintas, Chã de Cemitério, Chã de Ponta do Sol, Lombinho, Lombo da Cruz, Lombo de Paço, Os Órgãos, Ponta do Sol and Ribeira da Ponta do Sol.

Ponta do Sol takes its name from the nearby headland Ponta do Sol, the northernmost point of Cape Verde. The former name Vila Dona María Pia refers to Maria Pia of Savoy, queen of Portugal between 1862 and 1889. Urban development of Ponta do Sol started in the 1880s; before, it was a small fishing village. The church Nossa Senhora do Livramento was built in 1894. There is a Jewish cemetery in the town.

== Historical population ==
Year	Population
1990 (Census)	1,505
2010 (Census)	2,143

== Notable people ==
- Jorge Ferreira Chaves, Portuguese architect
- Raul Pires Ferreira Chaves, Portuguese worker

== See also ==
- Agostinho Neto Airport
- List of cities and towns in Cape Verde
