= Ribeira Grande, Cape Verde =

Ribeira Grande
- Settlement
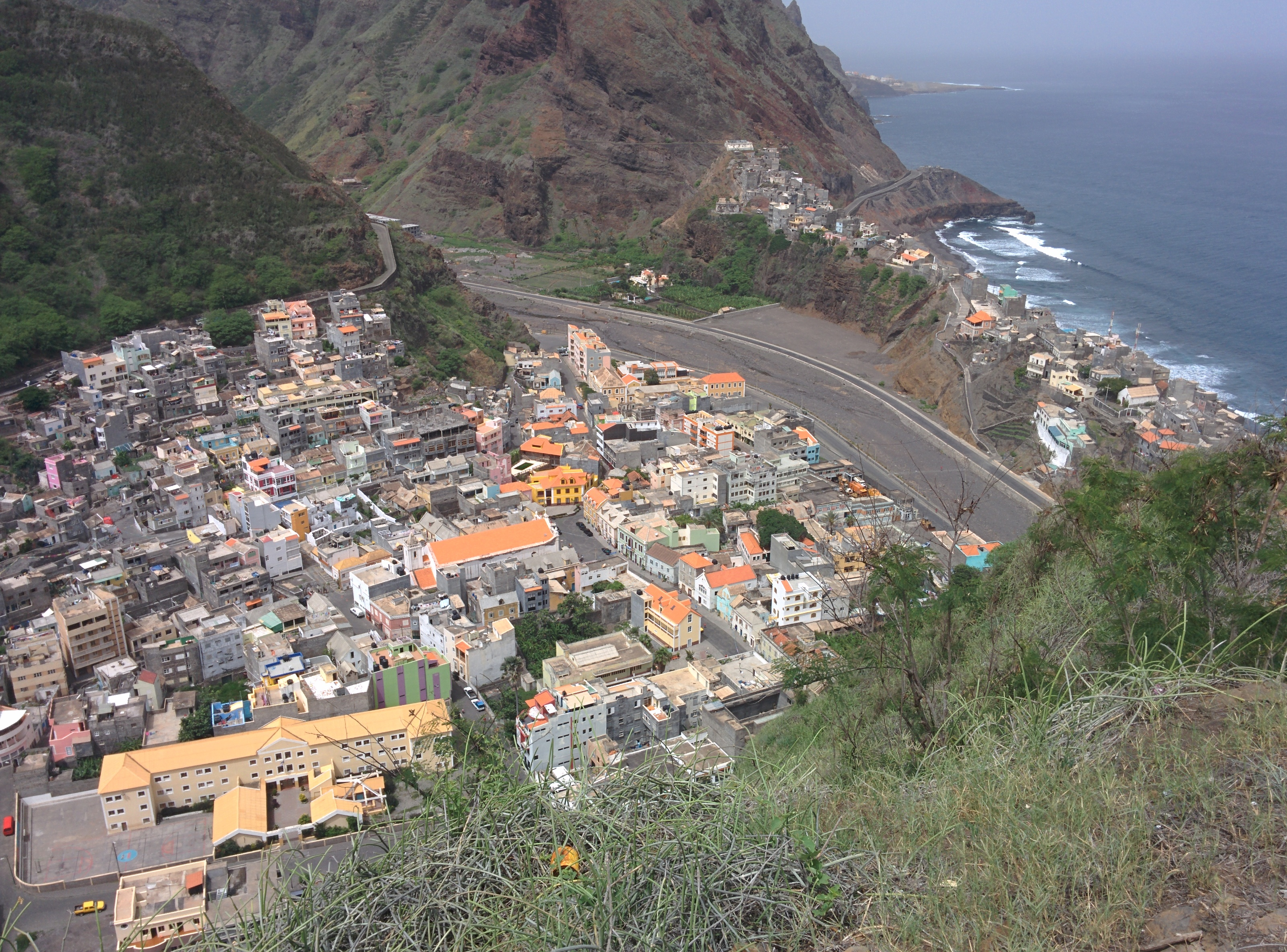
- View of Ribeira Grande town and stream

- Location within Cape Verde
- Coordinates: 17.183°N 25.065°W
- Country: Cape Verde
- Island: Santo Antão
- Municipality: Ribeira Grande
- Civil parish: Nossa Senhora do Rosário
- Elevation: 31 m (102 ft)

Population (2010)
  - Total: 2,564
- Postal code: 1110
- ID: 11107

Ribeira Grande (also: Povoação) is the largest town of the Ribeira Grande Municipality on the island of Santo Antão, Cape Verde. It became a city in 2010. In 2010 its population was 2,564. It is situated in the northeastern part of the island, near the outflow of the river Ribeira Grande and its tributary Ribeira da Torre into the Atlantic Ocean. Neighborhoods include Tarrafal, Rua de Agua, Rua d'Horta and Penha de França.

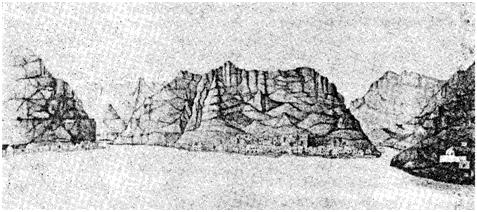
Cove of Ribeira Grande in the mid 19th century

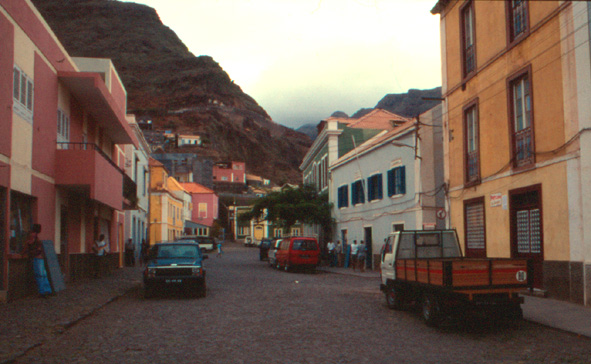
A typical street featuring colonial architecture

== History ==
Although the island was already discovered in 1462, the first evidence of settlement dates from 1548. The main settlement was Ribeira Grande, which became the seat of the municipality of Santo Antão in 1732.

Its earlier buildings are built with Portuguese colonial architecture. The church of Nossa Senhora do Rosário is the parish church.

Notable people includes chemist Roberto Duarte Silva, poet Manuel de Novas, and José Luís Jesus, former foreign minister and president of the International Tribunal for the Law of the Sea.

== Demographics ==
Year	Population
1990	2,550
2005	2,950
2010	2,564
