= Pico da Cruz (village) =

- Settlement
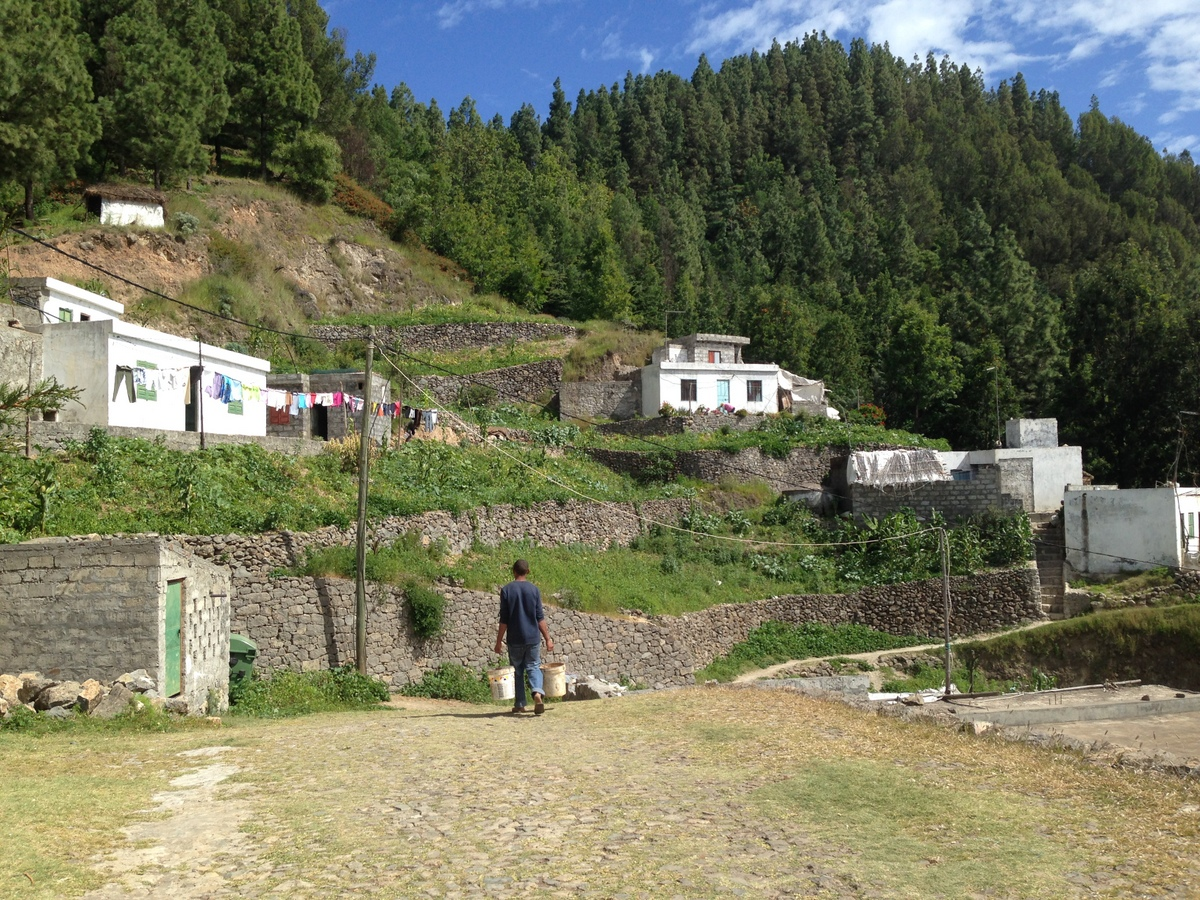
- Village of Pico da Cruz

- Location within Cape Verde
- Coordinates: 17.102°N 25.035°W
- Country: Cape Verde
- Island: Santo Antão
- Municipality: Paul
- Civil parish: Santo António das Pombas

Population (2010)
  - Total: 138
- ID: 12104

Pico da Cruz is a settlement in the northeastern part of the island of Santo Antão, Cape Verde. In 2010 its population was 138. It is situated 6 km southwest of Pombas and 10 km northeast of the island capital Porto Novo. Its elevation is about 1,400 meters. The village is named after the nearby mountain Pico da Cruz. It lies in the Cova-Paul-Ribeira da Torre Natural Park.

== See also ==
- List of villages and settlements in Cape Verde
