= Figueiral =

- Settlement
- Coordinates: 17.131°N 25.035°W
- Country: Cape Verde
- Island: Santo Antão
- Municipality: Paul
- Civil parish: Santo António das Pombas

Population (2010)
  - Total: 591
- ID: 12110

Figueiral is a settlement in the eastern part of the island of Santo Antão, Cape Verde. In 2010, its population was 591. It is part of the municipality of Paul. It is situated in the valley of the Ribeira do Figueiral, a tributary of the Ribeira do Paul, 2 km southwest of Eito and 3 km southwest of Pombas.

== See also ==
- List of villages and settlements in Cape Verde
