= Cova =

Cova or COVA may refer to:

== Places and jurisdictions ==
=== Algeria ===
- Cova, North Africa, the Ancient Roman city and modern Catholic titular see located at modern Ziama Mansouriah

=== Cape Verde ===
- Cova Figueira, a small city in the island of Fogo
- Cova (crater), a caldera in the island of Santo Antão
- Cova-Paul-Ribeira da Torre Natural Park, a protected area on the island of Santo Antão

=== Portugal ===
- Cova, Portugal, a parish in the municipality of Vieira do Minho

=== United States ===
- Commonwealth of Virginia (COVA), a U.S. state

== Persons ==
- Adrián Cova (born 2001), Venezuelan footballer
- Alberto Cova (born 1958), Italian long-distance track athlete
