= Cabo da Ribeira =

- Settlement
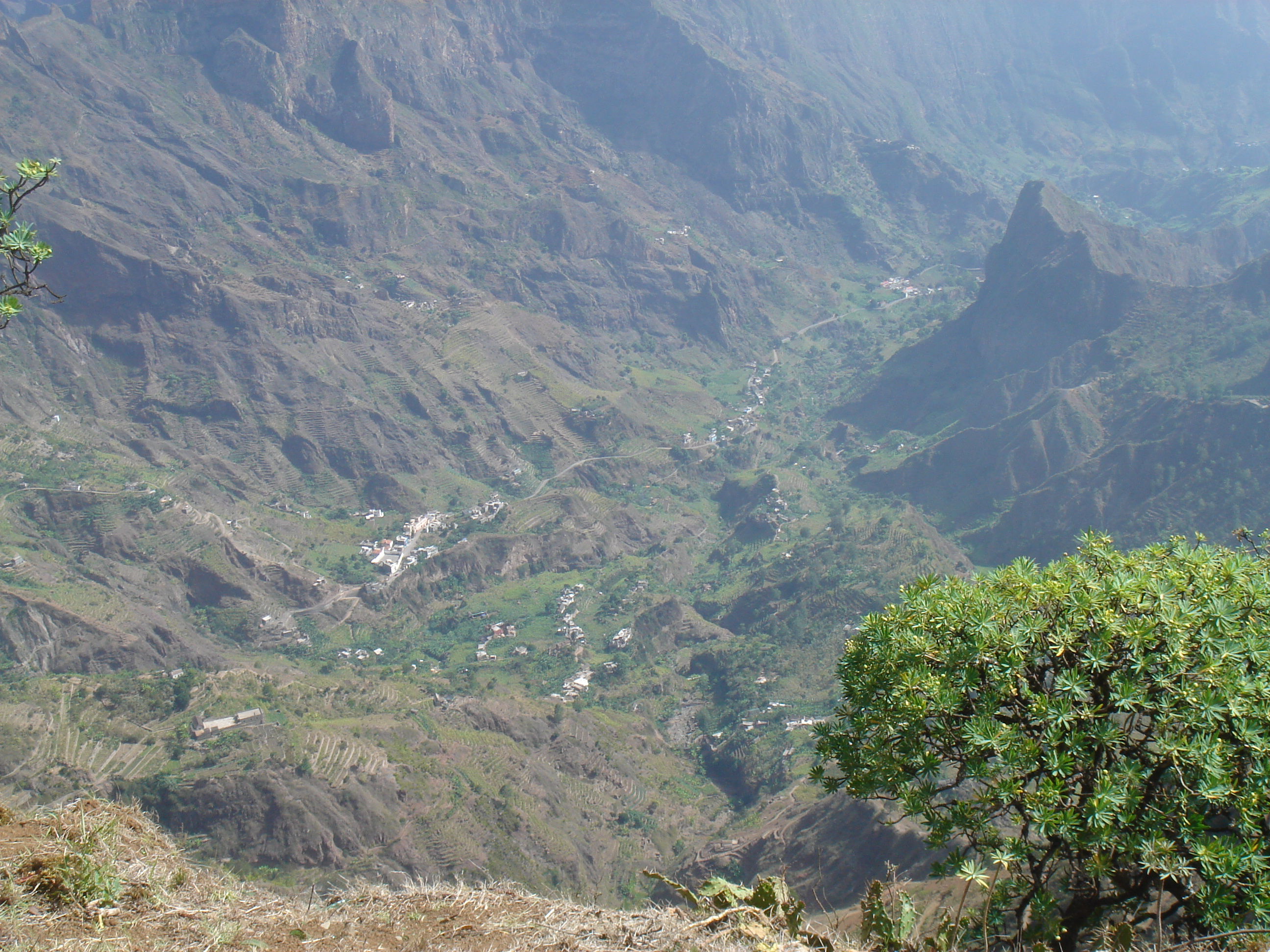
- The valley of Ribeira do Paul near Cabo da Ribeira

- Location within Cape Verde
- Coordinates: 17.1196°N 25.0519°W
- Country: Cape Verde
- Island: Santo Antão
- Municipality: Paul
- Civil parish: Santo António das Pombas

Population (2010)
  - Total: 912
- ID: 12101

Cabo da Ribeira is a settlement in the eastern part of the island of Santo Antão, Cape Verde. In 2010 its population was 912. It is situated at about 500 m elevation in the upper valley of the Ribeira do Paul, 5 km southwest of Pombas. It is part of the municipality of Paul, and lies in the Cova-Paul-Ribeira da Torre Natural Park.

== See also ==
- List of villages and settlements in Cape Verde
