= Paul, Cape Verde =

Municipality of Cape Verde

Paul
- Municipality
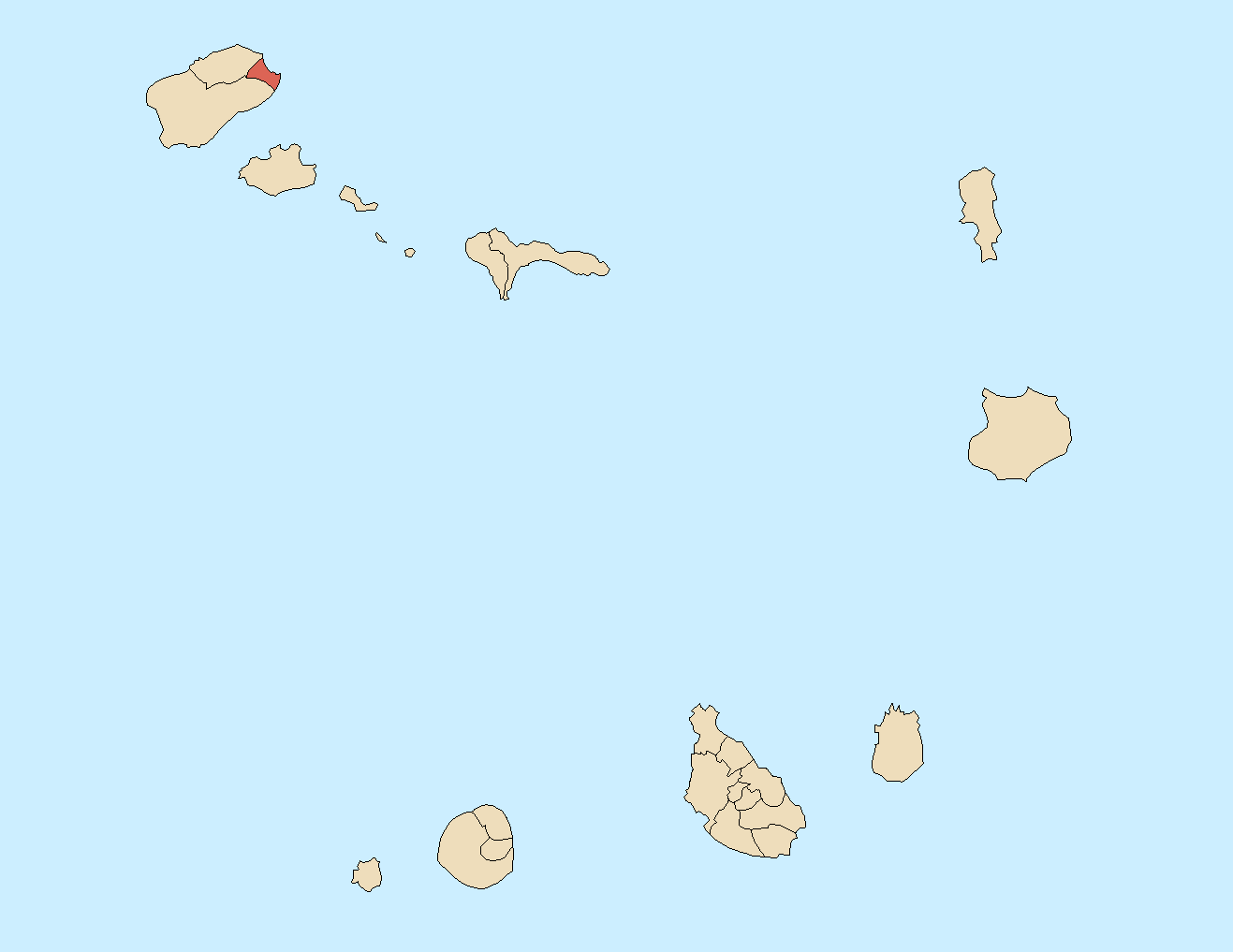
- Coordinates: 17.12°N 25.01°W
- Country: Cape Verde
- Island: Santo Antão

Area
  - Total: 54.26 km^{2} (20.95 sq mi)

Population (2010)
  - Total: 6,997
  - Density: 130/km^{2} (330/sq mi)
- Postal code: 11xx
- ID: 12

Paul is a concelho (municipality) of Cape Verde. Situated in the northeastern part of the island of Santo Antão, it covers 7% of the island area (54.3 km^{2}), and is home to 16% of its population (6,997 at the 2010 census). Its seat is the town Pombas.

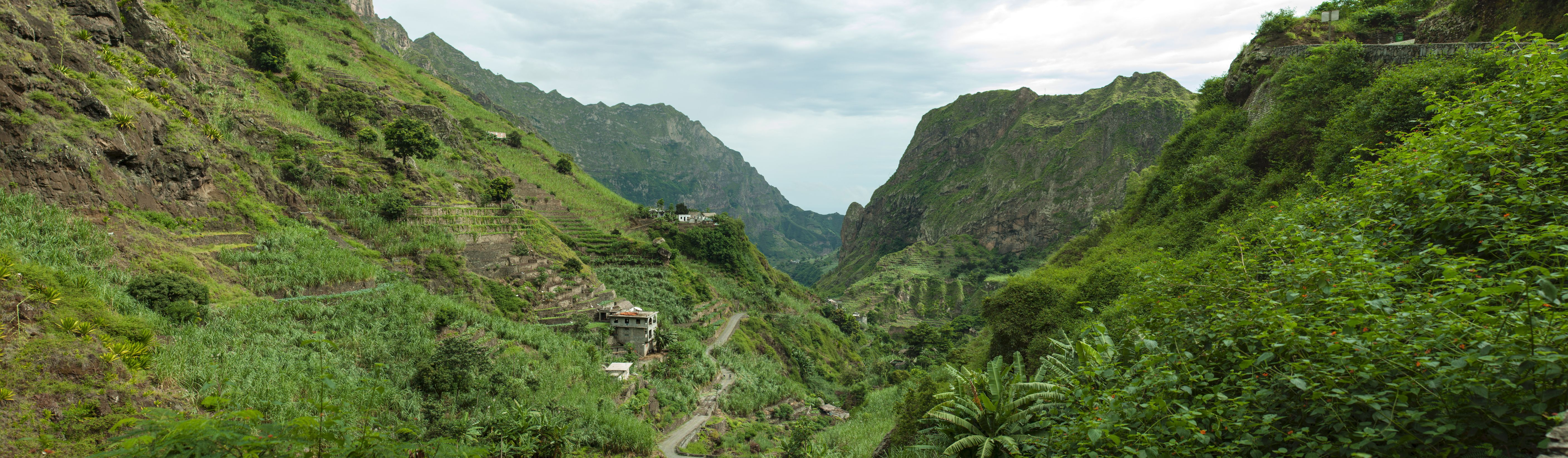
The Paul Valley on Santo Antão

== The municipality and parish ==
The municipality consists of one freguesia (civil parish), Santo António das Pombas. The freguesia is subdivided into the following settlements (population at the 2010 census):

- Cabo da Ribeira (pop: 912)
- Campo de Cão (pop: 787)
- Eito (pop: 979)
- Figueiral (pop: 591)
- Janela (pop: 1,658)
- Pico da Cruz (pop: 138)
- Pombas (pop: 1,295, city)
- Ribeira das Pombas (pop: 411)
- Ribeirãozinho (pop: 27)
- Santa Isabel (pop: 186)

== Demography ==
Population of Paul (1940—2010)
Year	Population
1940	5,845
1950	5,370
1960	6,024
1970	8,000
1980	7,983
1990	8,121
2000	8,385
2010	6,997

== Geography ==
The municipality has a rugged landscape, defined by the mountain valleys of the rivers Ribeira do Paul, Ribeira das Pombas, Ribeira de Gil, Ribeira da Janela, Ribeira do Penedo and Ribeira da Aguada. Its southwesternmost point is formed by the Cova Caldera. Its highest point is Pico da Cruz, at 1585 m elevation. The Cova-Paul-Ribeira da Torre Natural Park lies partly in the municipality of Paul. The national roads EN1-SA02 and EN1-SA03 connect Pombas with Ribeira Grande and Porto Novo, respectively.

== History ==
In 1867 the municipalities of Paul (covering the area of current Paul and Porto Novo) and Ribeira Grande were created from the previous municipality that covered the whole island of Santo Antão. These were merged in 1895 into one municipality, and recreated in 1917. In 1962 the municipality of Paul received its current borders, when the new municipality of Porto Novo was created.

== Notable people ==
- Antoninho Travadinha, commonly known as Travadinha, an autodidactic musician
- Josefina Chantre, fought for the end of Portuguese colonialism and for the independence of Guinea-Bissau and Cape Verde.

== Politics ==
Since 2012, the Movement for Democracy (MpD) is the ruling party of the municipality. The results of the latest elections, in 2016:

Party	Municipal Council		Municipal Assembly	
Party	Votes%	Seats	Votes%	Seats
MpD	55.29	5	54.95	8
PAICV	38.03	0	37.23	5
UCID	3.77	0	4.33	0

== Sister cities ==
Paul has five sister municipalities, all of them are in Portugal: Almodôvar, Benavente, Gavião, Odivelas and Sernancelhe.
