= Xoxo, Cape Verde =

Xoxo
- Settlement
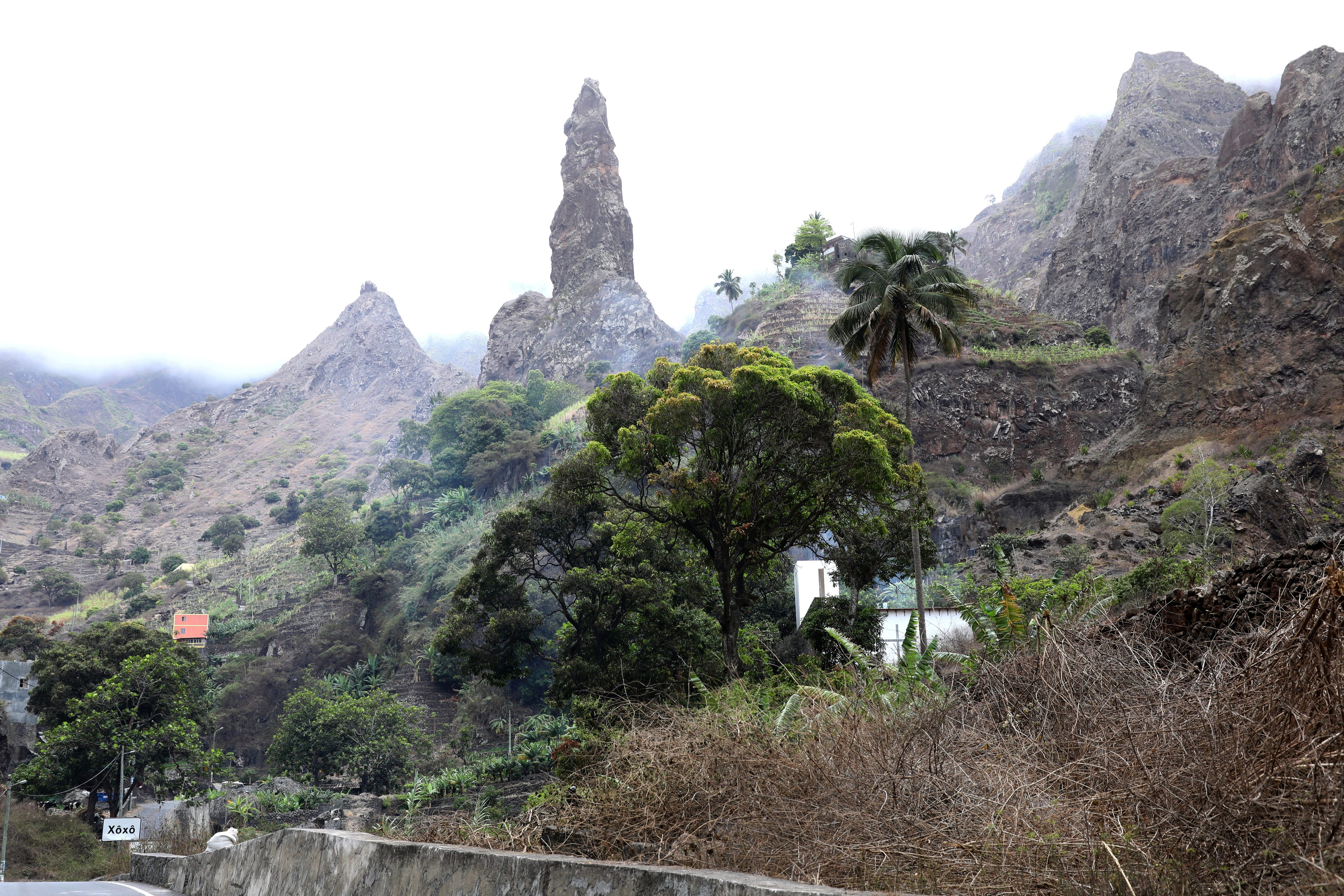
- Xôxô in the Ribeira da Torre valley

- Location within Cape Verde
- Coordinates: 17.139°N 25.067°W
- Country: Cape Verde
- Island: Santo Antão
- Municipality: Ribeira Grande
- Civil parish: Nossa Senhora do Rosário

Population (2010)
  - Total: 361
- ID: 11109

Xoxo (pronunciation: sho-sho) is a settlement in the northeastern part of the island of Santo Antão in Cape Verde. It is situated 5 kilometres (3.1 mi) south of Ribeira Grande and 13 kilometres (8.1 mi) north of the island capital Porto Novo. The settlement lies in Cova-Paul-Ribeira da Torre Natural Park. The Ribeira da Torre flows through the settlement. The only road to Xoxo goes from Ribeira Grande through the Ribeira da Torre valley.

== See also ==
- List of villages and settlements in Cape Verde
