= Eito =

- Settlement
- Coordinates: 17.143°N 25.024°W
- Country: Cape Verde
- Island: Santo Antão
- Municipality: Paul
- Civil parish: Santo António das Pombas

Population (2010)
  - Total: 979
- ID: 12103

Eito is a village in the northeastern part of the island of Santo Antão, Cape Verde, part of the municipality of Paul. It is situated 1 km southwest of Pombas, 2 km northeast of Figueiral and 15 km northeast of the island capital Porto Novo. Its population was 979 in 2010.

== See also ==
- List of villages and settlements in Cape Verde
