= Tetragnatha torrensis =

Scientific classification
- Kingdom: Animalia
- Phylum: Arthropoda
- Subphylum: Chelicerata
- Class: Arachnida
- Order: Araneae
- Infraorder: Araneomorphae
- Family: Tetragnathidae
- Genus: Tetragnatha
- Species: T. torrensis

Binomial name
- Tetragnatha torrensis Schmidt & Piepho, 1994

Species of spider

Tetragnatha torrensis is a species of long-jawed orb weaving spiders of the family Tetragnathidae. It is endemic on the island of Santo Antão, Cape Verde. The species name torrensis refers to the place where it was found: Ribeira da Torre.
