= Cova-Paul-Ribeira da Torre Natural Park =

Natural park in Cape Verde

Coordinates: 17.12208°N 25.02677°W

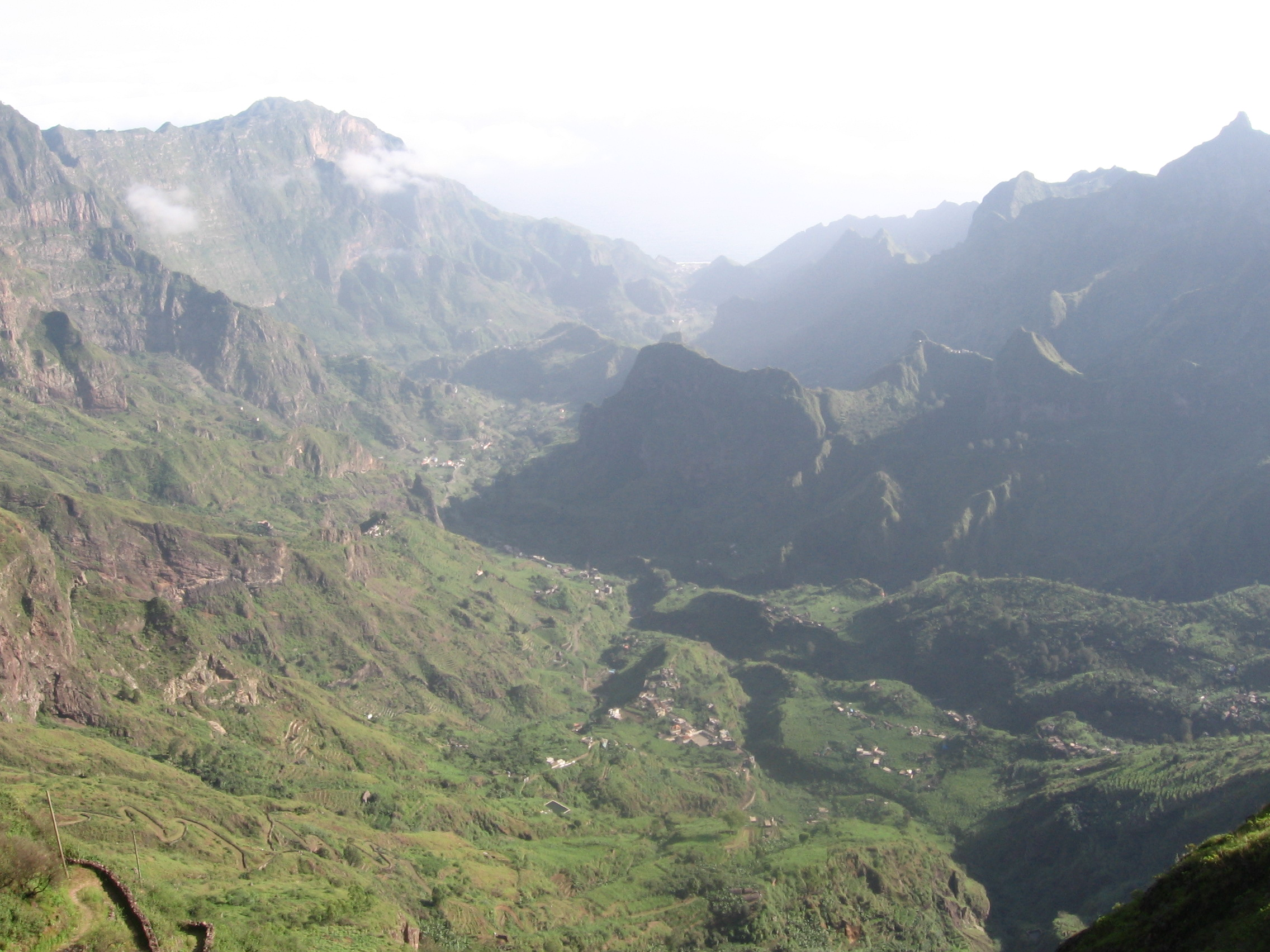
- The Paul Valley facing towards the ocean
- Interactive map of Cova-Paul-Ribeira da Torre Natural Park
- Area: 20.92 km^{2} (8.08 sq mi)

Cova-Paul-Ribeira da Torre Natural Park, in the east of the island of Santo Antão, is one of ten "natural parks" in the country of Cape Verde. Its area is 20.92 km^{2} (8.08 sq mi), of which 8.91 km^{2} (3.44 sq mi) in the municipality of Ribeira Grande, 8.85 km^{2} (3.42 sq mi) in the municipality of Paul and 3.16 km^{2} (1.22 sq mi) in the municipality of Porto Novo. Since 2016, the natural park is on the tentative list of World Heritage Sites.

== Geography ==
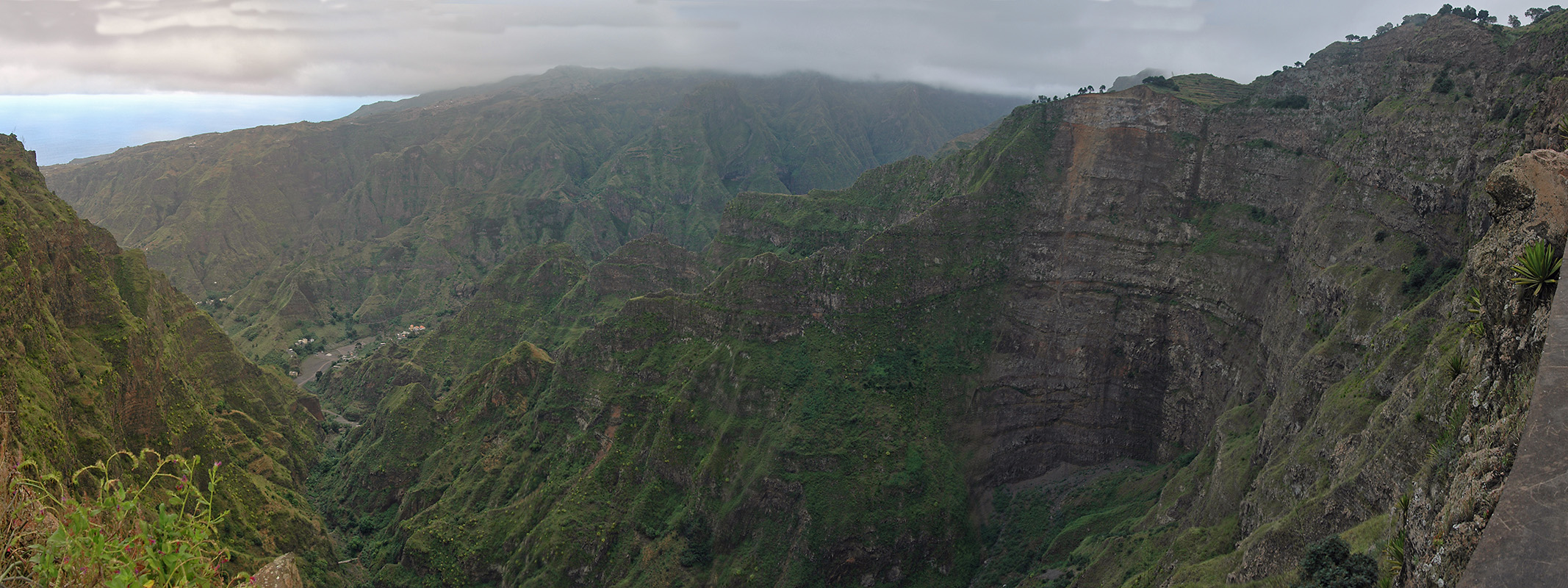
The area surrounding the Cova Crater

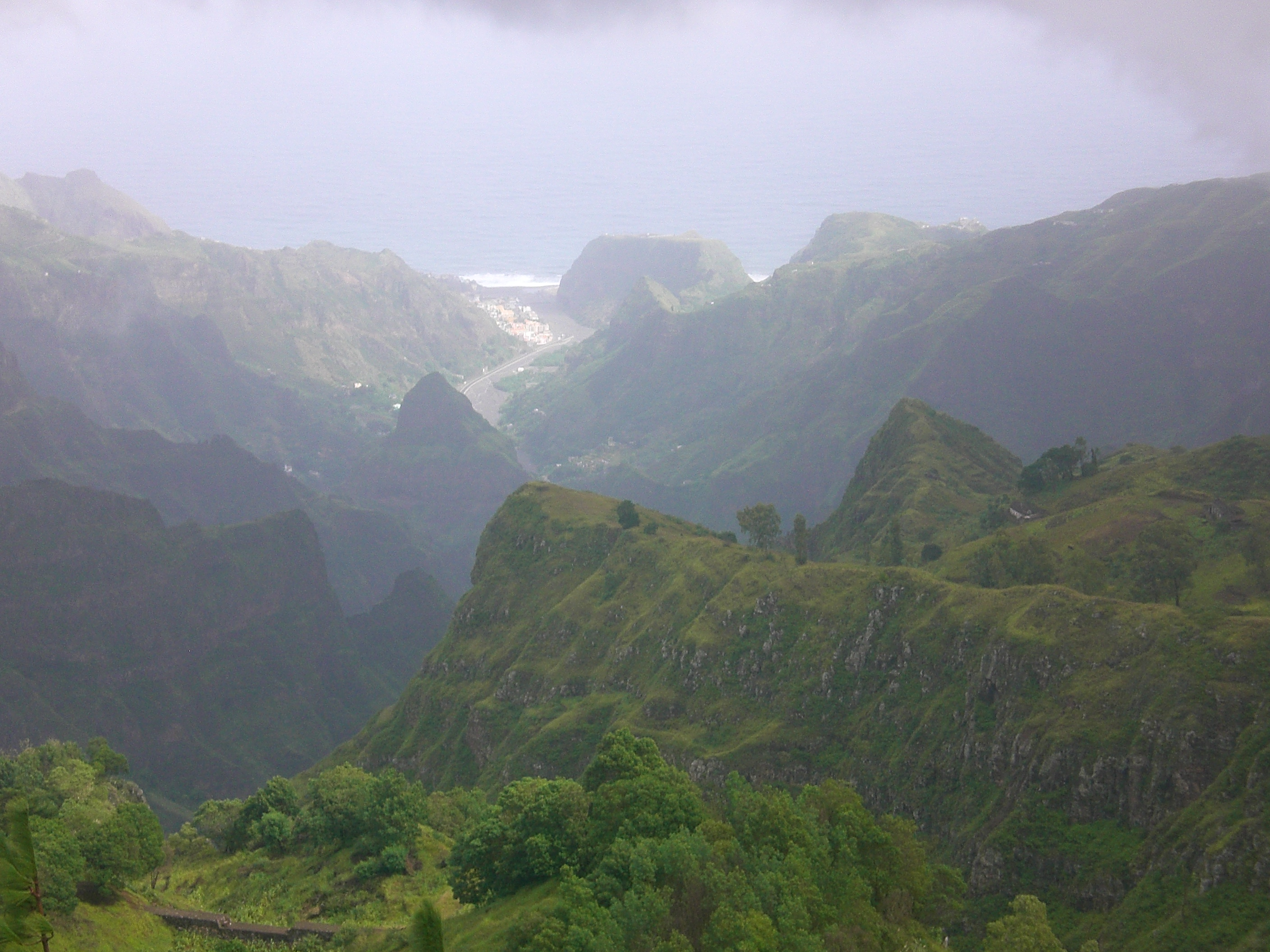
Ribeira da Torre and its valley

The natural park covers the Cova Crater, the upper valley of the Ribeira da Torre (from Xoxo upstream), the upper valley of the Ribeira do Paul and the Pico da Cruz. The landscape is characterised by the volcanic crater of Cova, the steep cliffs and escarpments that end in the deep river valleys. Its elevation ranges from around 400 m near Xoxo to 1585 m at the Pico da Cruz.

== Flora and fauna ==
The land cover in the natural park is part forest and part farmland. It has a large variety of endemic plants, many of which are critically endangered, endangered or vulnerable species, including Carex antoniensis, Conyza pannosa, Tornabenea insularis, Euphorbia tuckeyana and Globularia amygdalifolia. The park is the habitat of several endemic species of reptiles and birds.

== See also ==
- List of protected areas in Cape Verde
