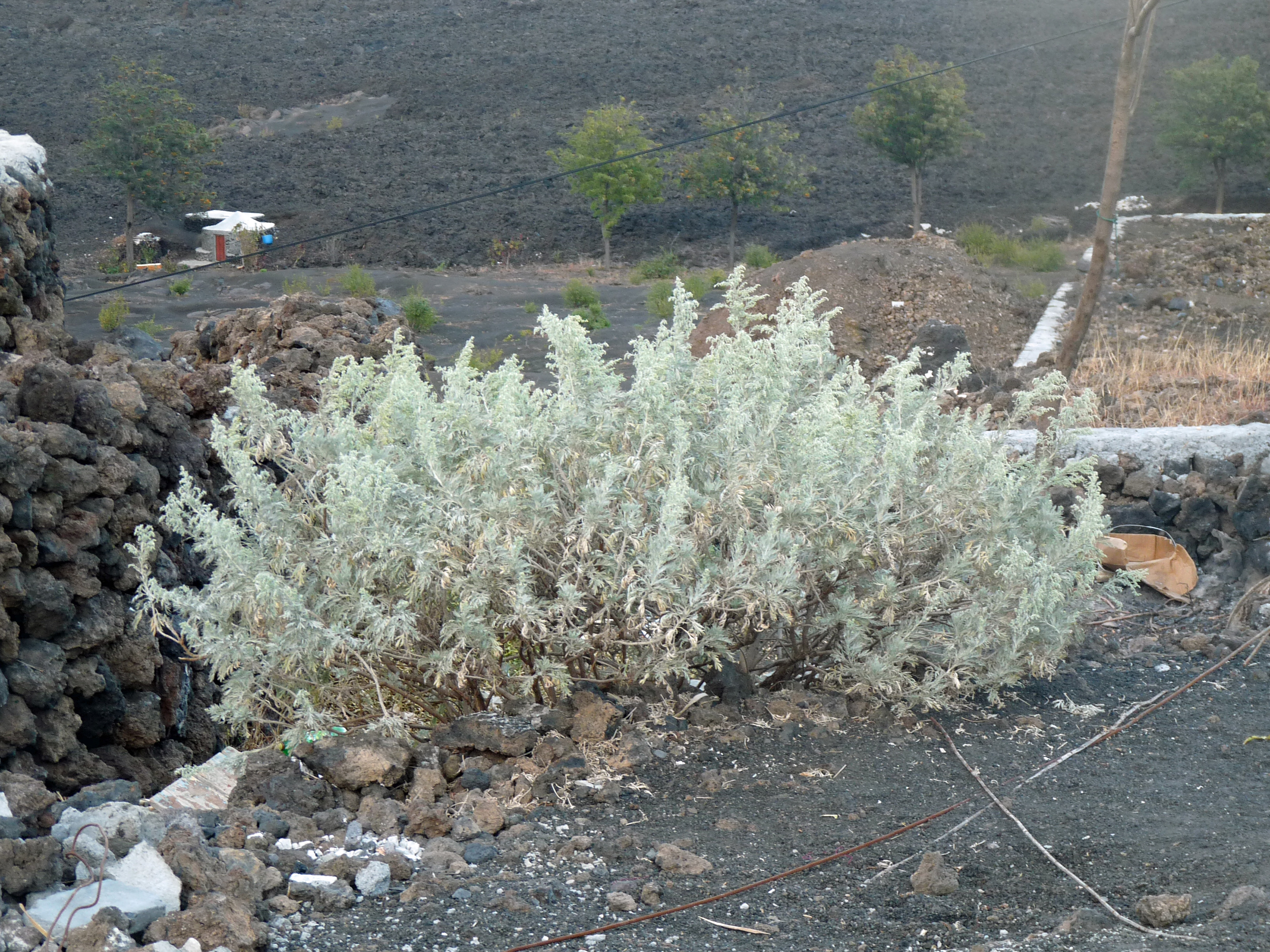
- Artemisia gorgonum at Chã das Caldeiras

Conservation status
- Vulnerable (IUCN 3.1)

Scientific classification
- Kingdom: Plantae
- Clade: Tracheophytes
- Clade: Angiosperms
- Clade: Eudicots
- Clade: Asterids
- Order: Asterales
- Family: Asteraceae
- Genus: Artemisia
- Species: A. gorgonum

Binomial name
- Artemisia gorgonum Webb, 1849

= Artemisia gorgonum =

Species of flowering plant

Artemisia gorgonum is a species of flowering plants of the family Asteraceae, endemic to Cape Verde. Its local name is losna or lasna. The plant plays a role in traditional medicine.

== Description ==
Artemisia gorgonum is an aromatic shrub that can reach 2 metres. It has small yellow flowers.

== Distribution and ecology ==
Artemisia gorgonum occurs in the islands of Santo Antão, Santiago and Fogo, in semi-arid, subhumid and humid zones. It grows mainly on plains and stony slopes. The main altitudinal distribution is between 800 m and 2000 m.
