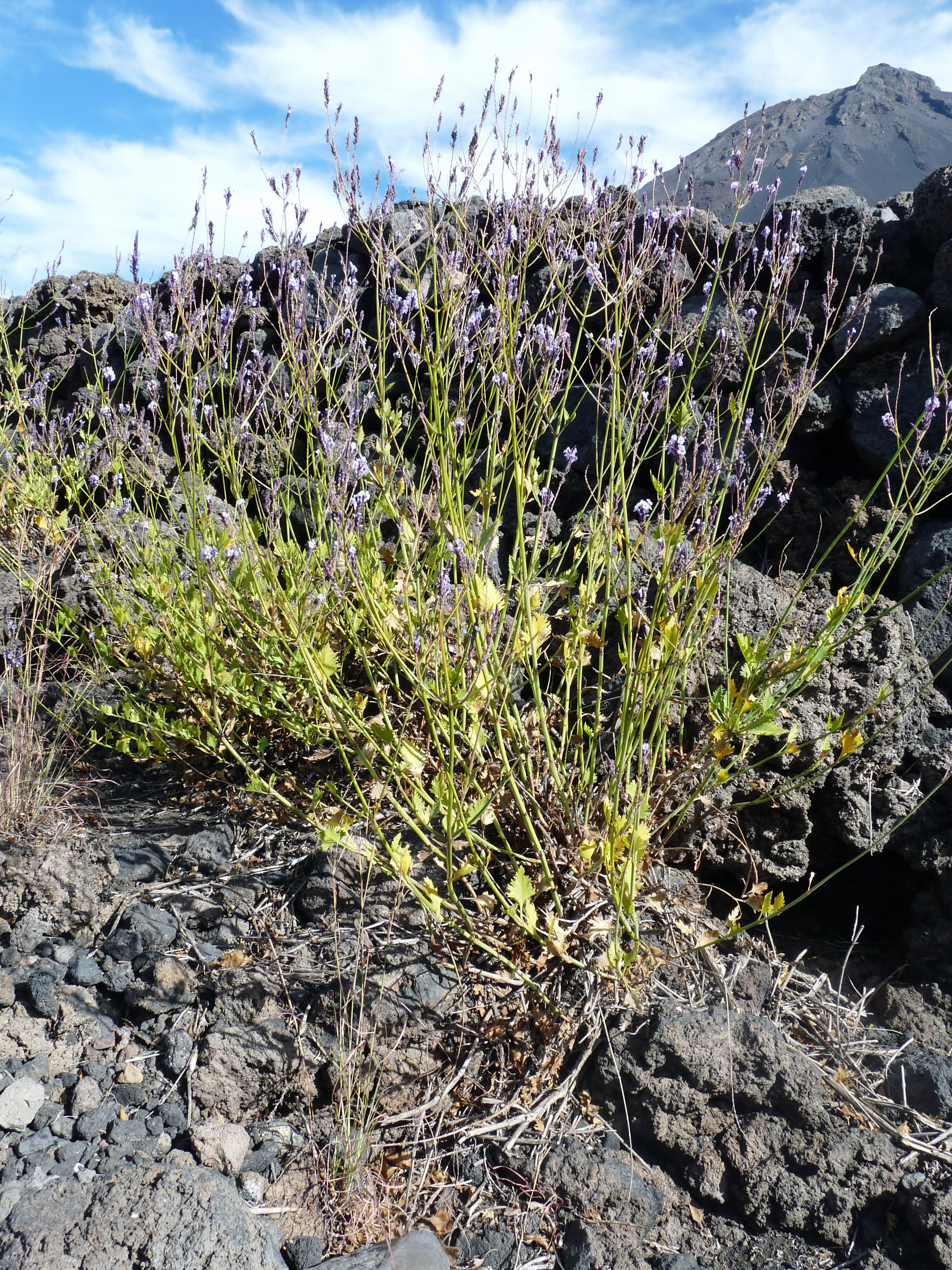
- Lavandula rotundifolia on the foot of Pico do Fogo

Conservation status
- Near Threatened (IUCN 3.1)

Scientific classification
- Kingdom: Plantae
- Clade: Tracheophytes
- Clade: Angiosperms
- Clade: Eudicots
- Clade: Asterids
- Order: Lamiales
- Family: Lamiaceae
- Genus: Lavandula
- Species: L. rotundifolia

Binomial name
- Lavandula rotundifolia Benth., 1833

Synonyms
- List: Stoechas rotundifolia (Benth.) Rchb.f.; Lavandula rotundifolia var. crenata Lowe ex Sunding & M.C.León; Lavandula rotundifolia var. incisa Bolle; Lavandula rotundifolia var. subpinnatifida A.Chev.

= Lavandula rotundifolia =

Species of flowering plant

Lavandula rotundifolia (common name: round leaf lavender) is a species of flowering plant of the family Lamiaceae. The species is endemic to Cape Verde. The species was named by George Bentham in 1833. Its local name is aipo.

== Description ==
Lavandula rotundifolia is characterized by the rounded leaves for which it is named. It is a woody shrub, highly branched, reaching up to 1 metre in height. Leaves measure up to 7 cm long. Flowers are blue, or occasionally white.

== Distribution and ecology ==
Lavandula rotundifolia occurs on the islands of Santo Antão, São Vicente, São Nicolau, Santiago and Fogo. It favours semi-arid conditions such as escarpments and rocky soil, and can be used to stabilize slopes. It is a pioneer species on escarpments, volcanic soils and rocky crevices.

(c) IUCN
