= Carex antoniensis =

Conservation status
- Critically Endangered (IUCN 3.1)

Scientific classification
- Kingdom: Plantae
- Clade: Embryophytes
- Clade: Tracheophytes
- Clade: Spermatophytes
- Clade: Angiosperms
- Clade: Monocots
- Clade: Commelinids
- Order: Poales
- Family: Cyperaceae
- Genus: Carex
- Species: C. antoniensis

Binomial name
- Carex antoniensis A.Chev. (1935)

Species of grass-like plant

Carex antoniensis is a species of grassy plants that belong to the family Cyperaceae. The species is endemic to Cape Verde, where it only occurs on the island of Santo Antão. It is listed as critically endangered by the IUCN. The specific name refers to the island of Santo Antão.
