= Ribeira da Torre =

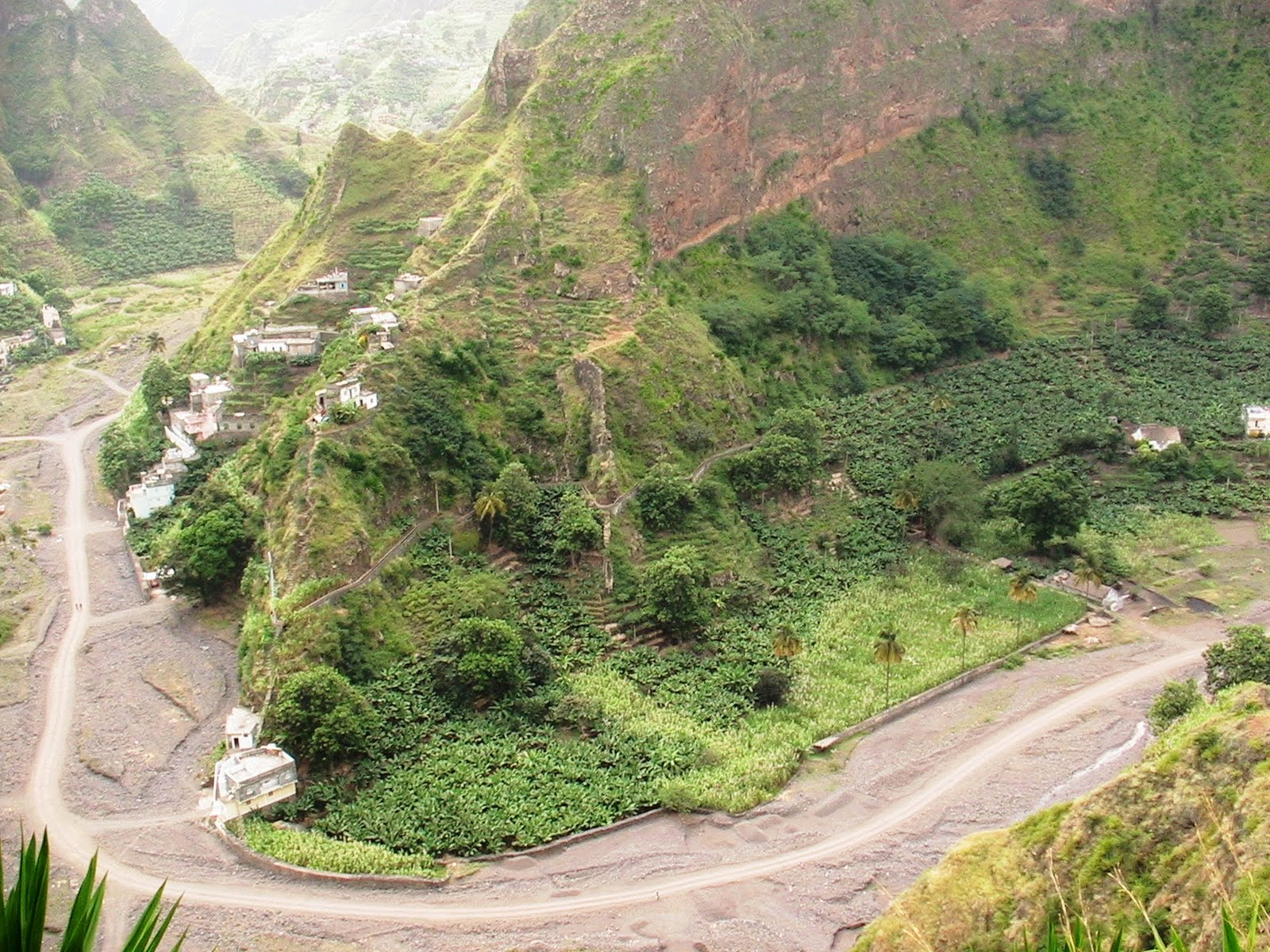
- Ribeira da Torre at Varzinha (Fajã Domingas Benta)

Location
- Country: Cape Verde

Physical characteristics
- Source
  - location: Rabo Curto, south of Xoxo, Santo Antão
  - elevation: about 1,400 m (4,600 ft)
- Mouth
  - location: Ribeira Grande
  - coordinates: 17.1841°N 25.0637°W

Ribeira da Torre is a torrential stream in the northeastern part of the island of Santo Antão in Cape Verde. Its source is in the mountains north of the Cova crater, near the locality Rabo Curto. It flows to the north through the settlements Xoxo, Fajã Domingas Benta and Lugar de Guene. In the city Ribeira Grande it flows into the river Ribeira Grande, just upstream of its outflow into the Atlantic Ocean. Its upper valley is part of the protected area Cova-Paul-Ribeira da Torre Natural Park. There is small-scale agriculture in the valley, producing sugar cane, coffee, yam, banana, papaya and mango.

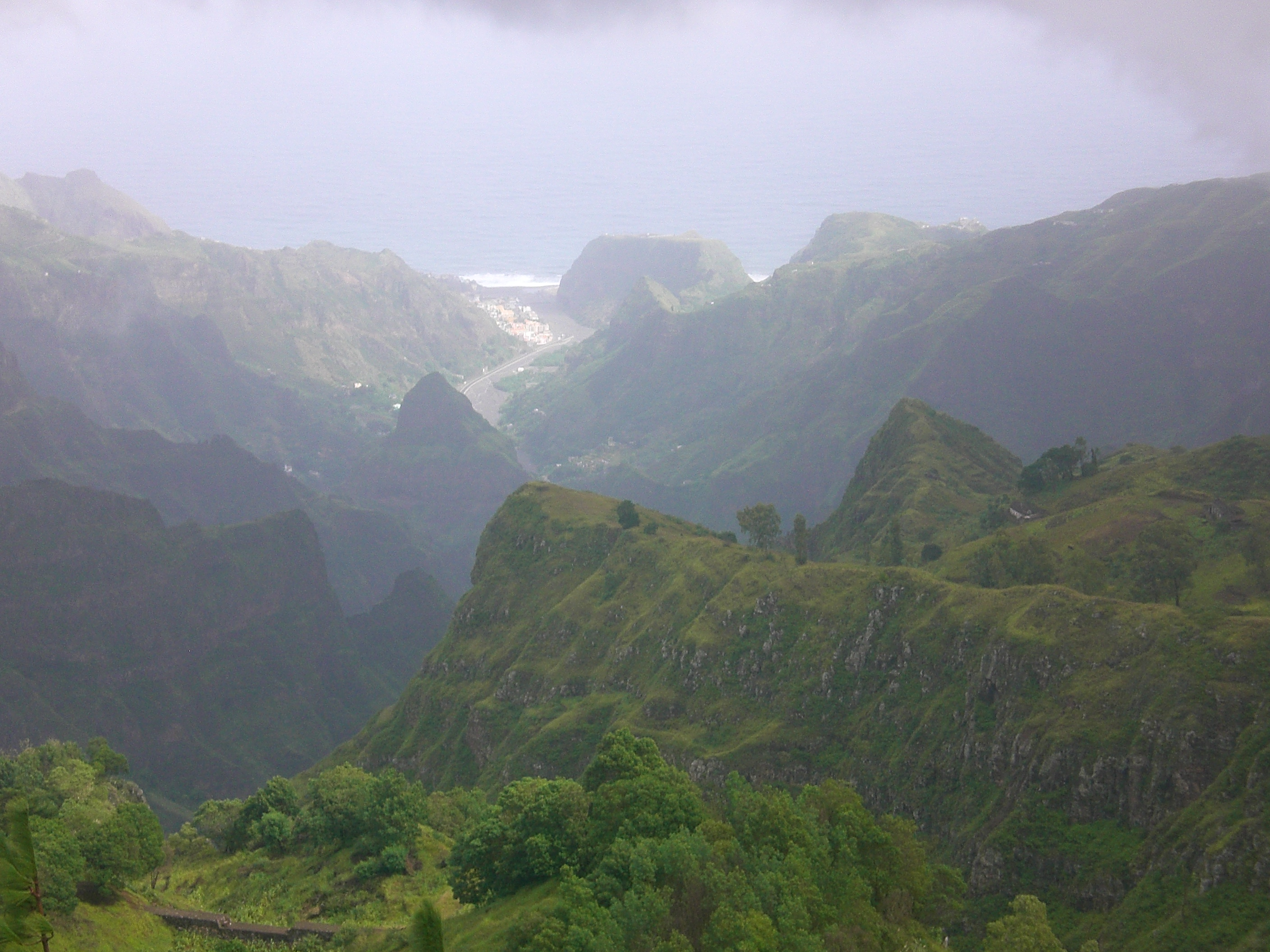
View of Ribeira da Torre's valley along with the city of Ribeira Grande and the Atlantic

== See also ==
- List of streams in Cape Verde
