= Ribeira da Janela, Cape Verde =

Ribeira da Janela

Location
- Country: Cape Verde

Physical characteristics
- Source
  - location: east of Pico da Cruz, Santo Antão
- Mouth
  - location: Atlantic Ocean
  - coordinates: 17.1219°N 24.9947°W

Ribeira da Janela is a stream in the eastern part of the island of Santo Antão in Cape Verde. The stream flows from southwest to northeast. Its source is east of Pico da Cruz and it empties into the Atlantic Ocean in the settlement Janela, west of the village Pontinha.

== See also ==
- List of streams in Cape Verde
