= Antoninho Travadinha =

Autodidactic musician of Cape Verde (1937–1987)

António Vicente Lopes (1937–1987), better known as Antoninho Travadinha was one of the major autodidactic musicians of Cape Verde originated from Janela in Paúl the island of Santo Antão.

He performed the popular dances when he was only nine years old, and became internationally famous when he became forty, when he undertook a tournée in Portugal. One of his albums was recorded in Lisbon at the Hot Club (oldest Jazz Club in Portugal).

Other than the violin, Travadinha played the twelve string guitar, the cavaquinho and the guitar. Travadinha interpreted traditional music styles of Cape Verde including the morna and coladera. One of his songs was "Feiticeira di côr Morena".

He died in 1987.

== Works ==
- Le violon du Cap Vert, Buda musique, Paris, Universal, 1992
