= Pico da Cruz =

Mountain in Cape Verde

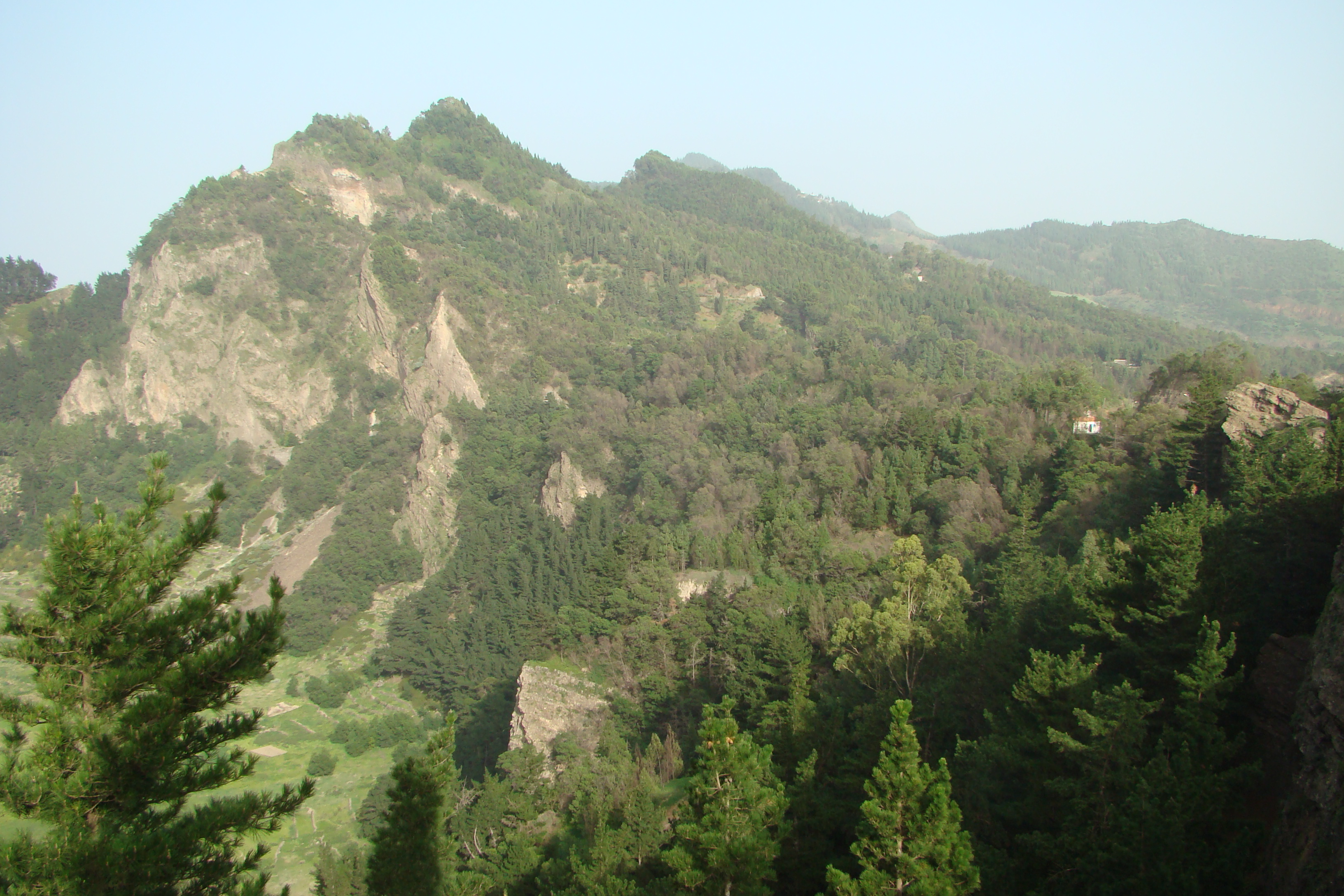
- Pico da Cruz

Highest point
- Elevation: 1,585 m (5,200 ft)
- Listing: List of mountains in Cape Verde
- Coordinates: 17°06′11″N 25°01′52″W

Geography
- Location within Cape Verde
- Location: eastern Santo Antão

Pico da Cruz (Portuguese meaning "peak of the cross") is a mountain in the eastern part of the island of Santo Antão. Its elevation is 1585 m. It is 5 km southwest of the town Pombas (Paul). It gives its name to the nearby village of Pico da Cruz, part of the municipality of Paul. Pico da Cruz is part of the protected area Cova-Paul-Ribeira da Torre Natural Park.

== See also ==
- List of mountains in Cape Verde
