= Ribeira do Paul =

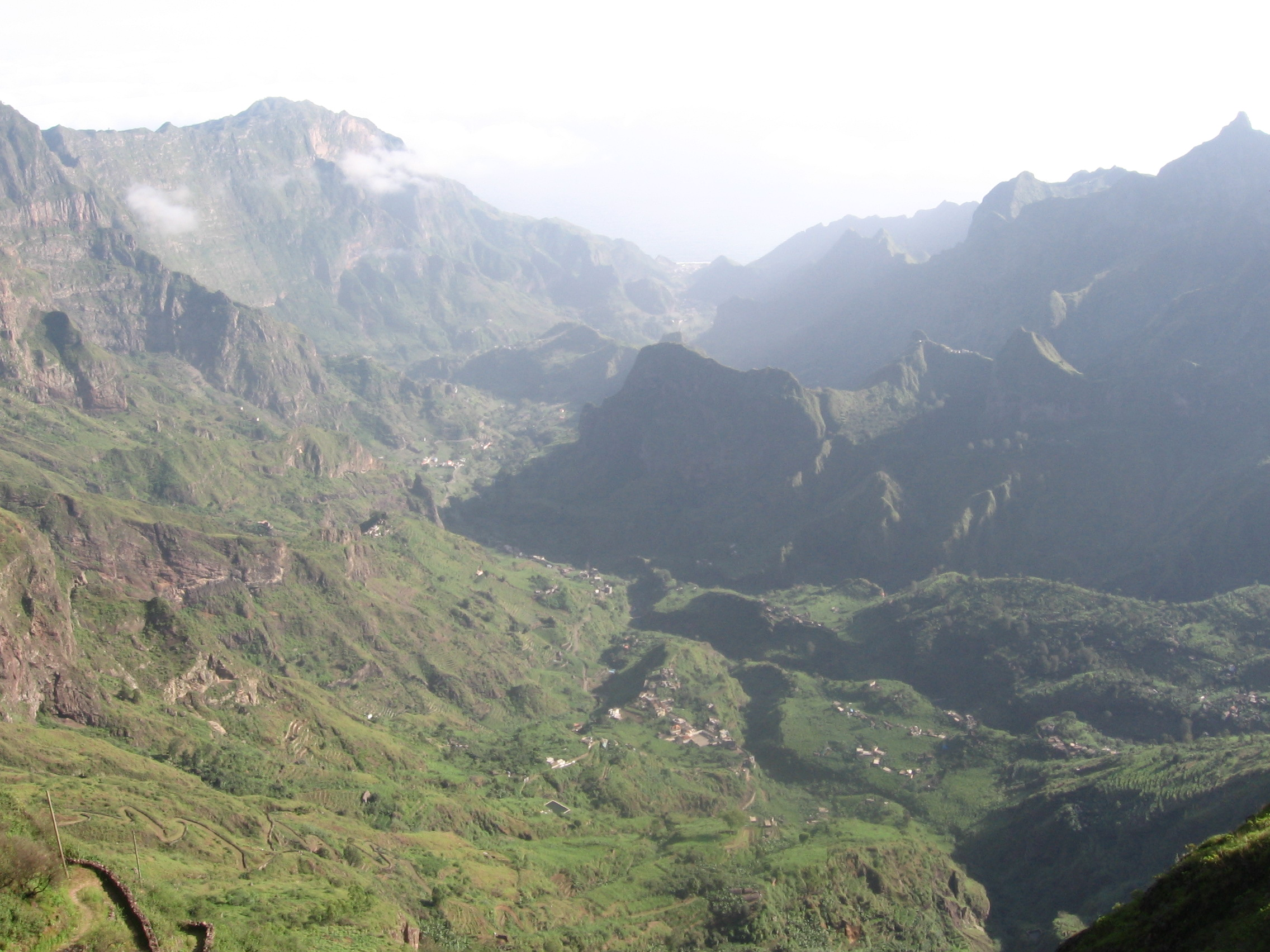
- Ribeira and Vale do Paul near Eito

Location
- Country: Cape Verde

Physical characteristics
- Source
  - location: near Cabo da Ribeira, Santo Antão
- Mouth
  - location: Atlantic Ocean
  - coordinates: 17.1500°N 25.0138°W

Ribeira do Paul is a seasonal stream that flows in the northeastern part of the island of Santo Antão in Cape Verde. The stream flows from southwest to northeast. The upper part of the valley belongs to Cova-Paul-Ribeira da Torre Natural Park.

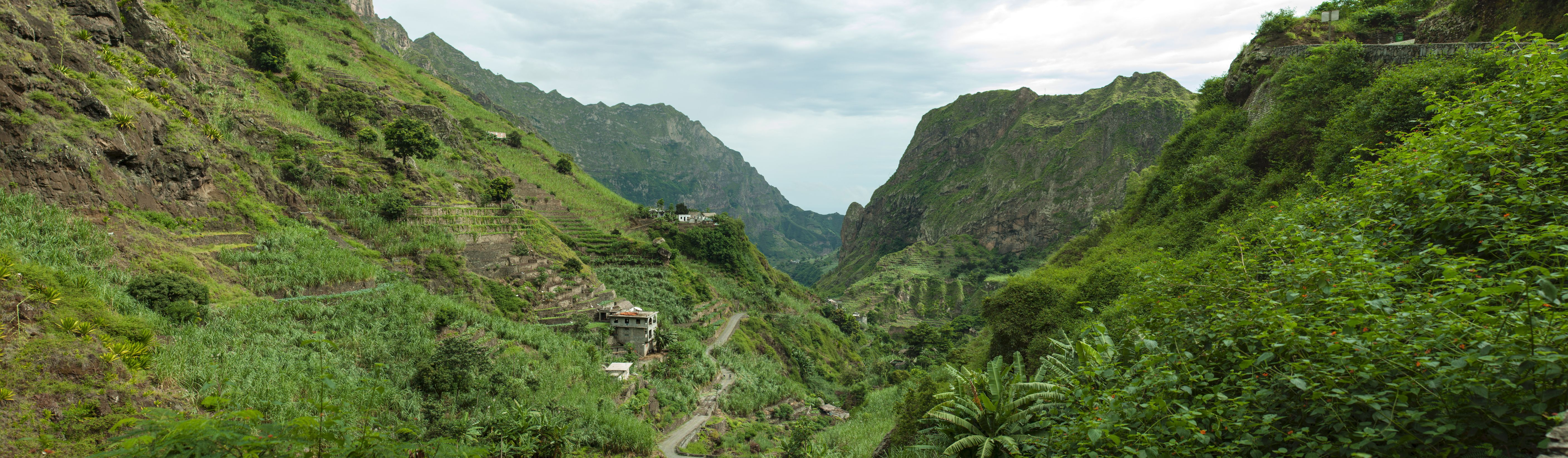

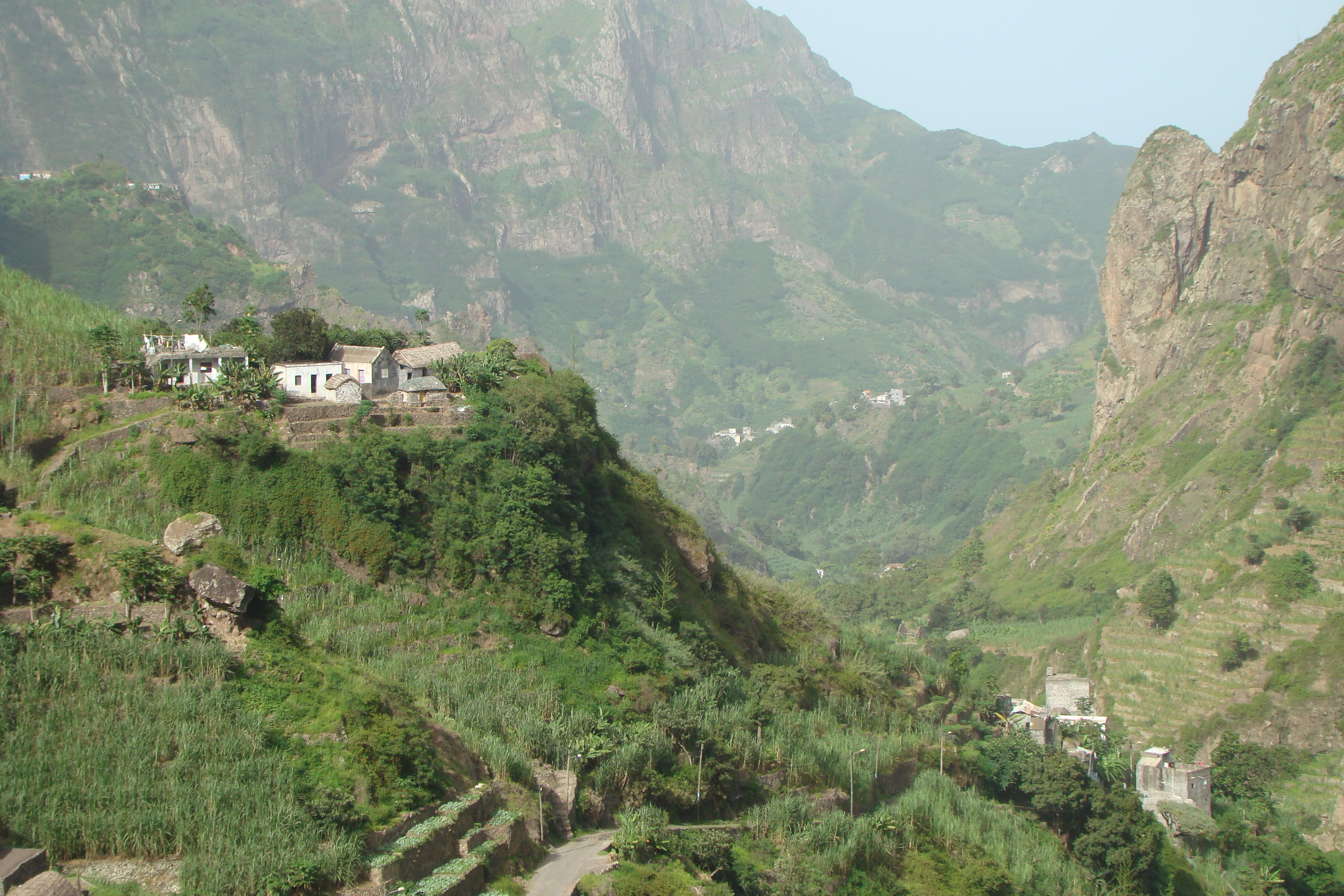

The sources of the stream Ribeira do Paul are northeast of the Cova crater, near the settlement Cabo da Ribeira. It flows through a narrow and steep gorge, along the settlements Campo de Cão and Eito, and flows into the Atlantic Ocean at the town of Pombas. There is small-scale agriculture in the valley, producing sugar cane, coffee, yam, banana, papaya and mango.

== See also ==
- List of streams in Cape Verde
