= List of streams of Cape Verde =

This is a partial list of streams of Cape Verde, sorted by island.

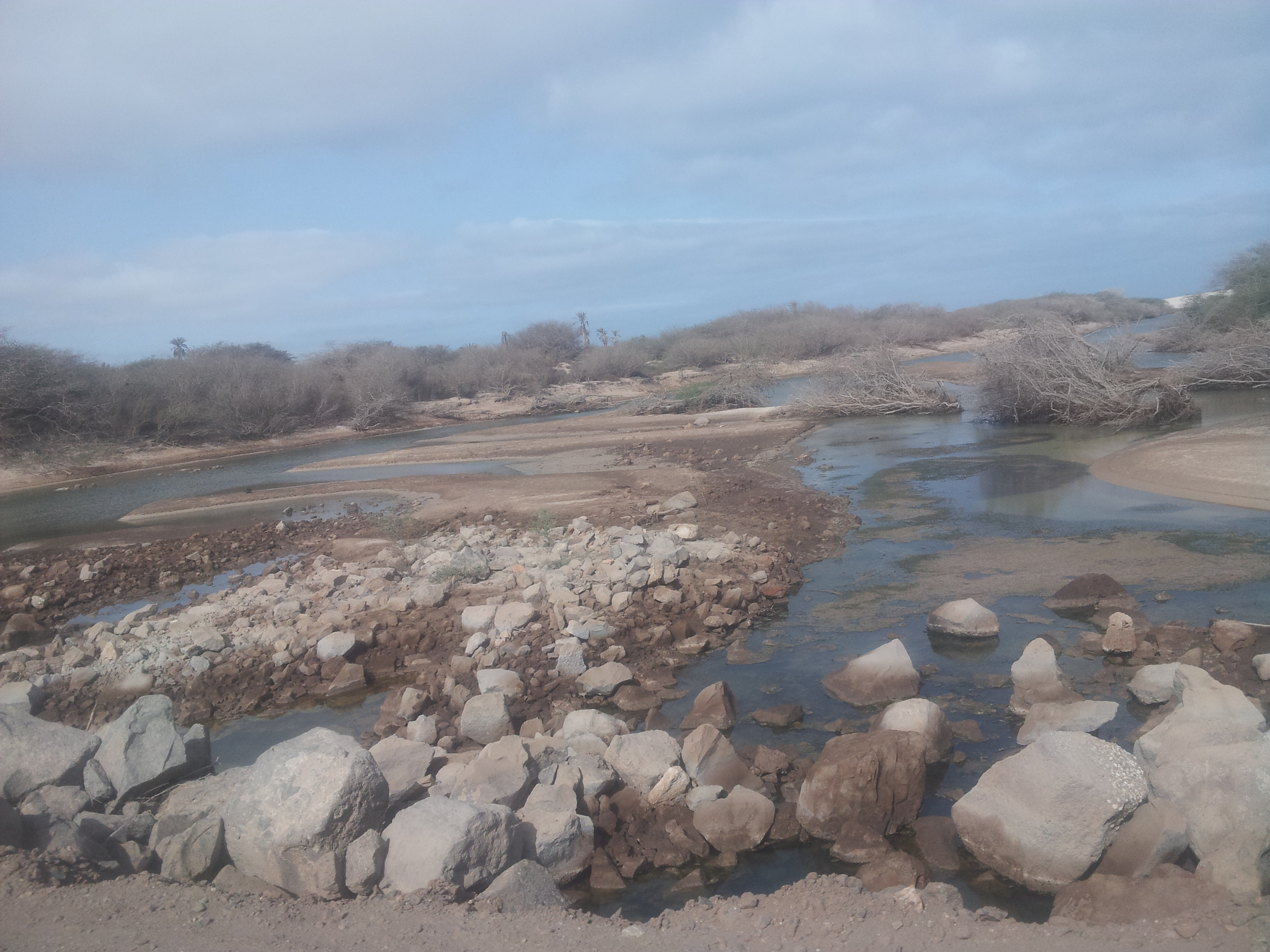
Ribeira do Rabil

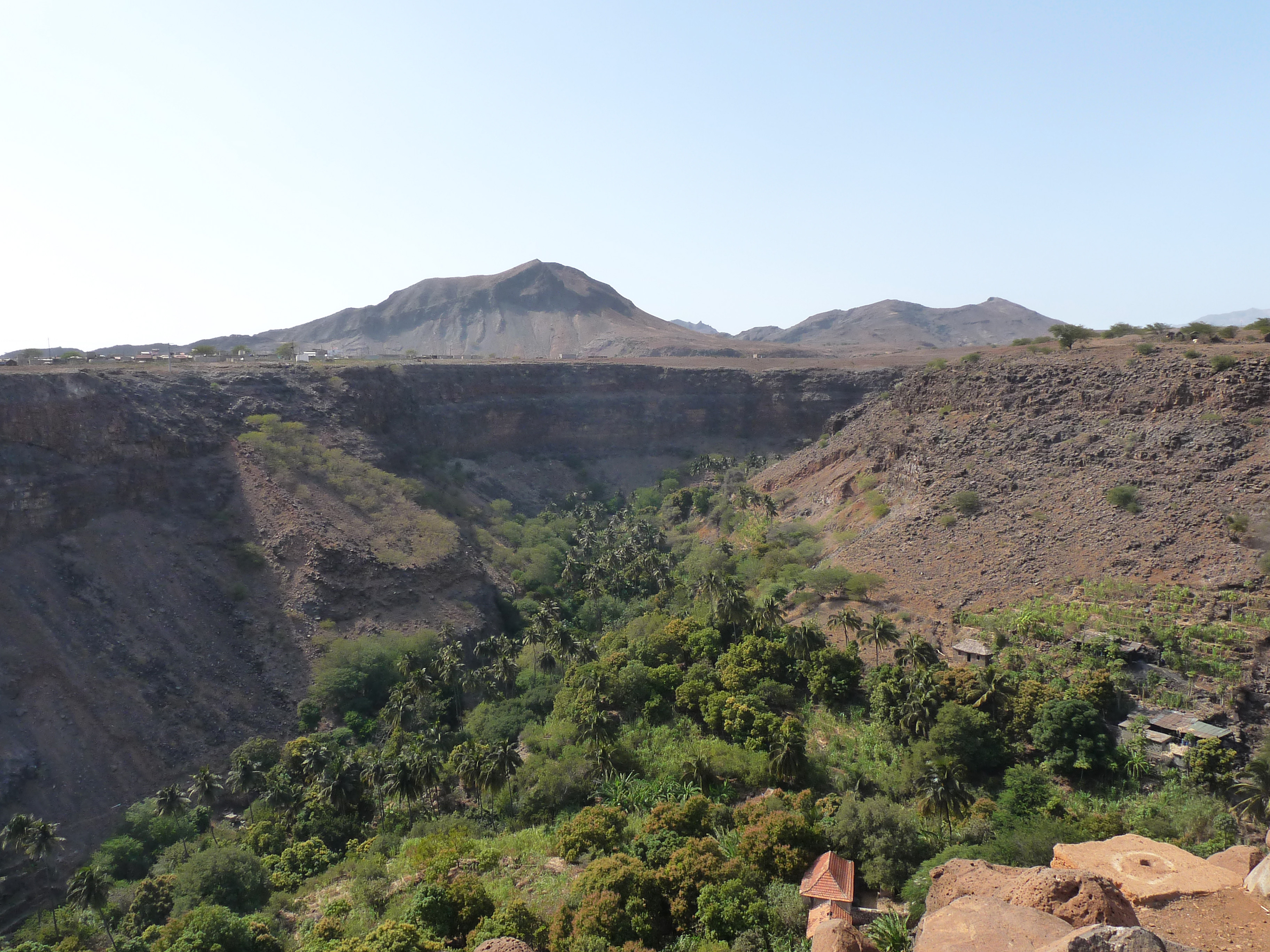
Ribeira Grande de Santiago/Ribeira Cadacina

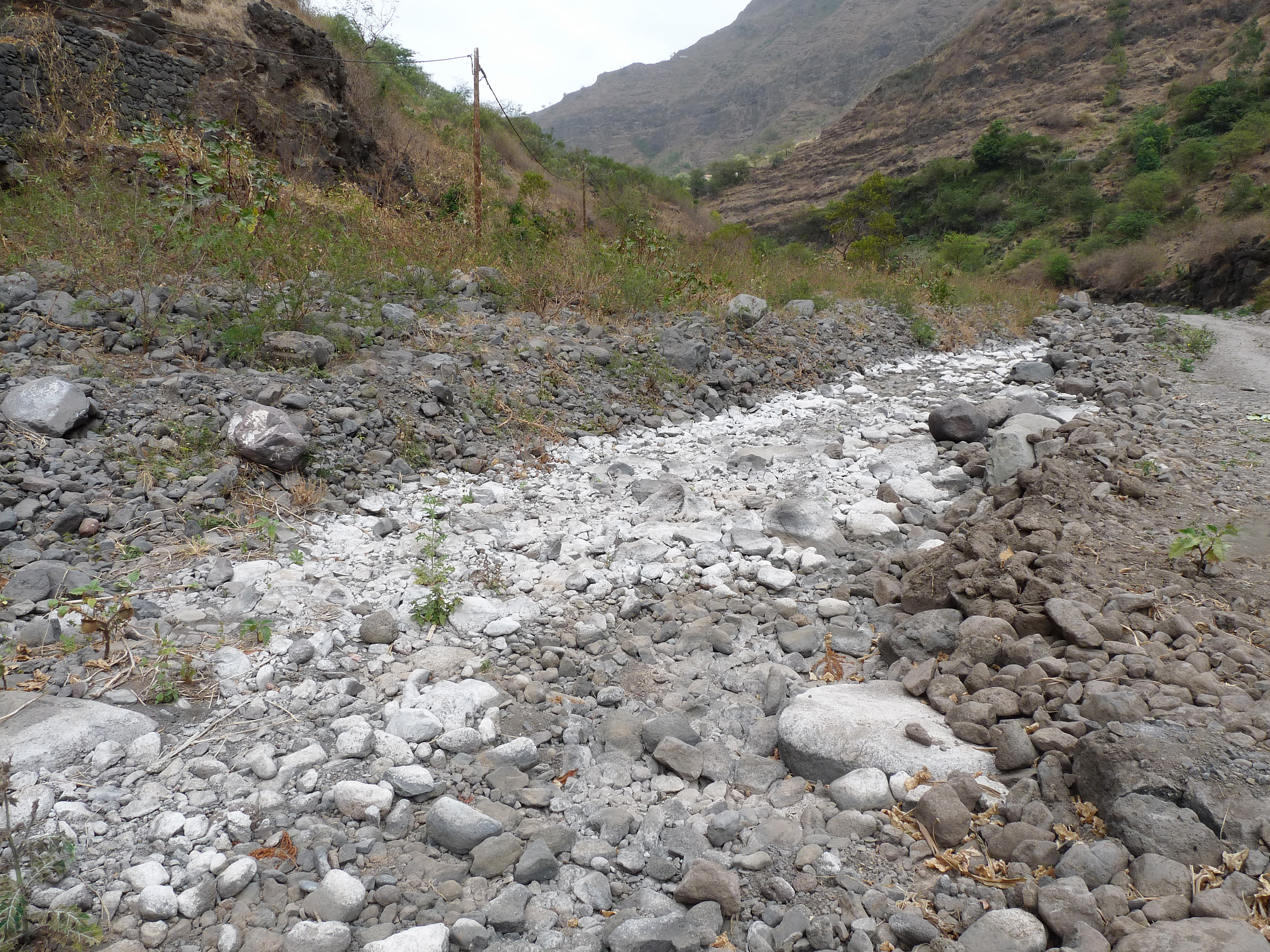
Ribeira Principal

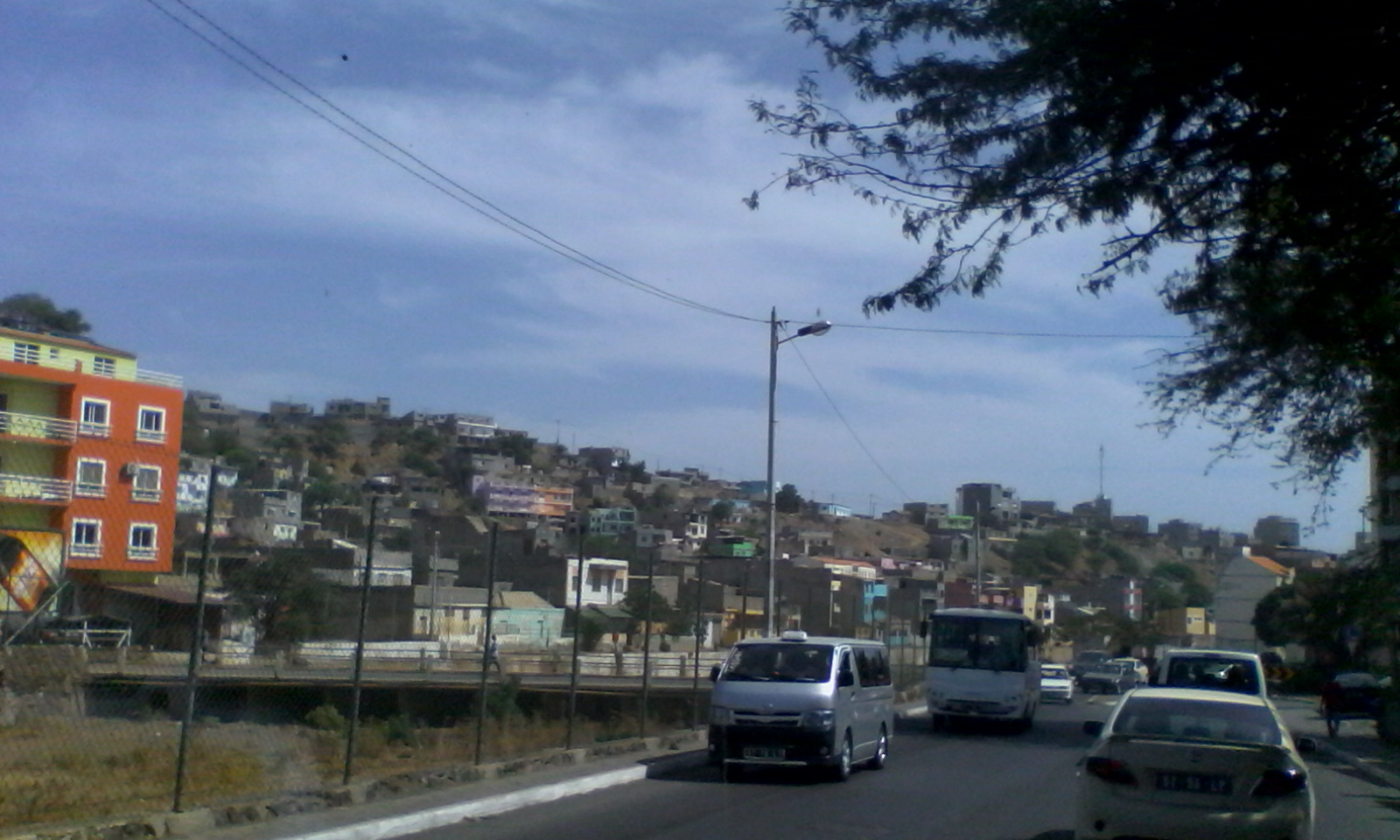
Ribeira da Trindade

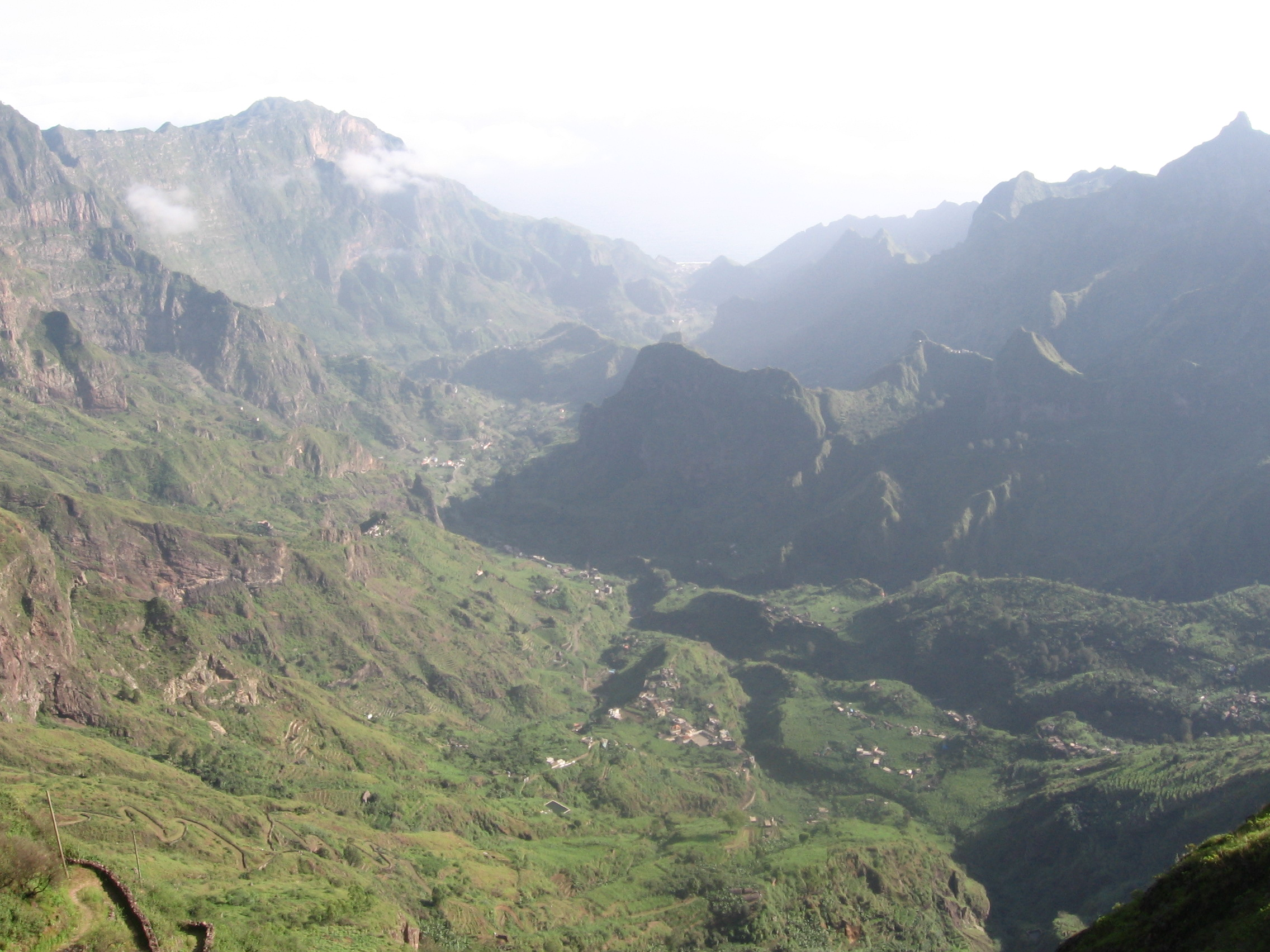
Ribeira do Paul

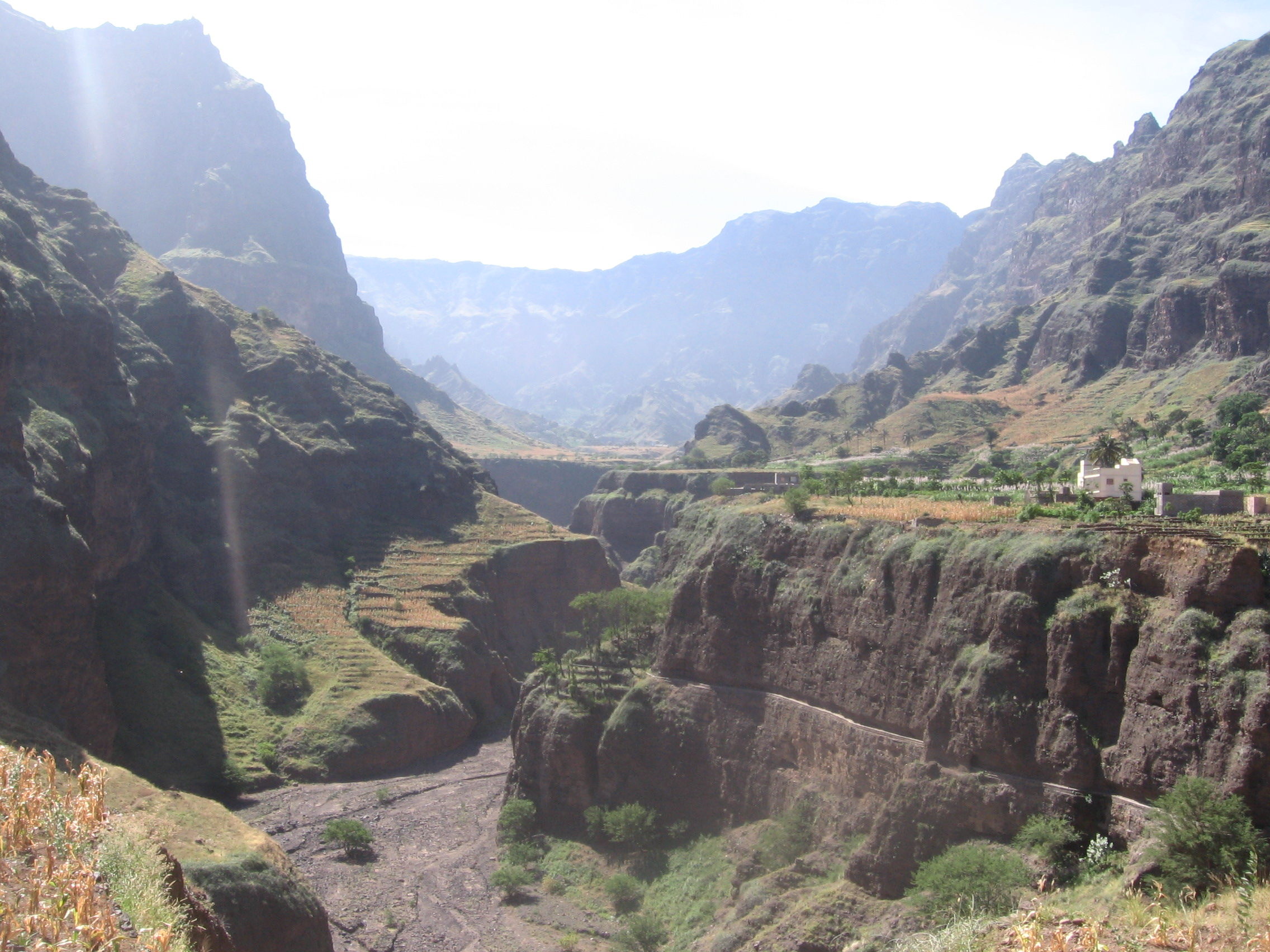
Ribeira da Garça

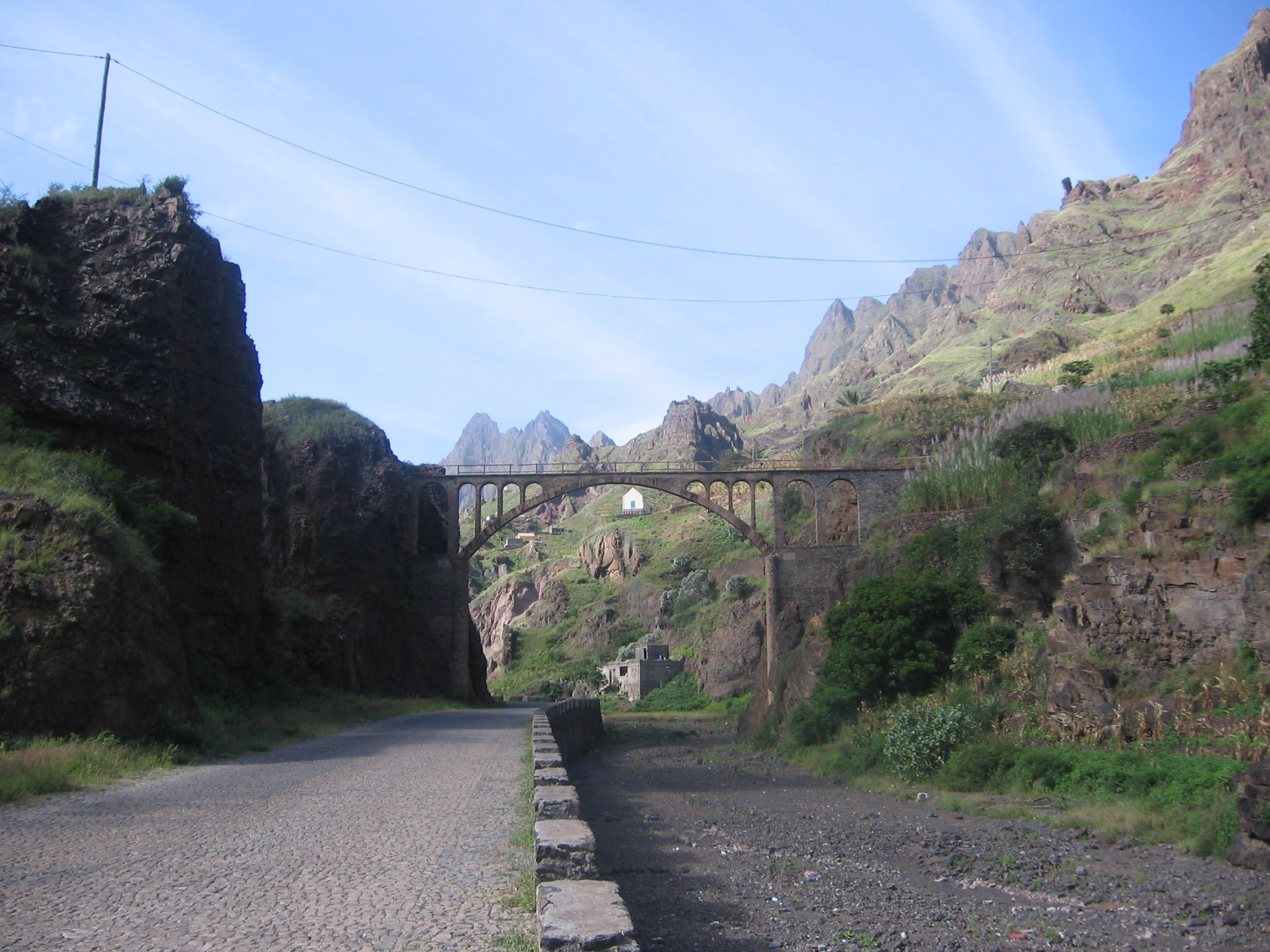
Ribeira Grande in Santo Antão

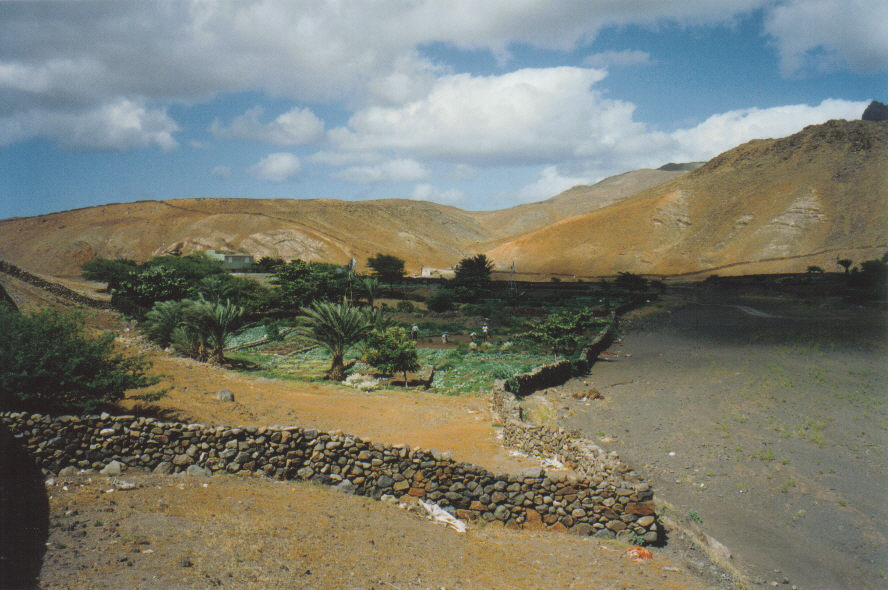
Ribeira do Calhau

Boa Vista

- Ribeira do Rabil

Santiago

- Ribeira Grande de Santiago/Ribeira Cadacina
- Ribeira Principal
- Ribeira Seca
- Ribeira da Trindade

Santo Antão

- Ribeira de Alto Mira
- Ribeira da Cruz
- Ribeira da Garça
- Ribeira Grande
- Ribeira da Janela
- Ribeira das Patas
- Ribeira do Paul
- Ribeira da Torre

São Vicente

- Ribeira do Calhau
- Ribeira de Julião

== See also ==
- Geography of Cape Verde
