= Conyza pannosa =

Conservation status
- Endangered (IUCN 3.1)

Scientific classification
- Kingdom: Plantae
- Clade: Tracheophytes
- Clade: Angiosperms
- Clade: Eudicots
- Clade: Asterids
- Order: Asterales
- Family: Asteraceae
- Genus: Conyza
- Species: C. pannosa

Binomial name
- Conyza pannosa Webb, 1849

Species of plant

Conyza pannosa is a species of flowering plant in the family Asteraceae. The species is endemic to Cape Verde. It is listed as an endangered plant by the IUCN. The plant was named by Philip Barker Webb in 1849. Its local name is taba.

== Distribution and ecology ==
Conyza pannosa occurs in the islands of Santo Antão, São Vicente, Santiago, São Nicolau and Brava. It is confined to humid areas, but in Santo Antão, they are also founded in semi-humid and semi-arid areas.
