= Cova (crater) =

Volcanic caldera in Cape Verde

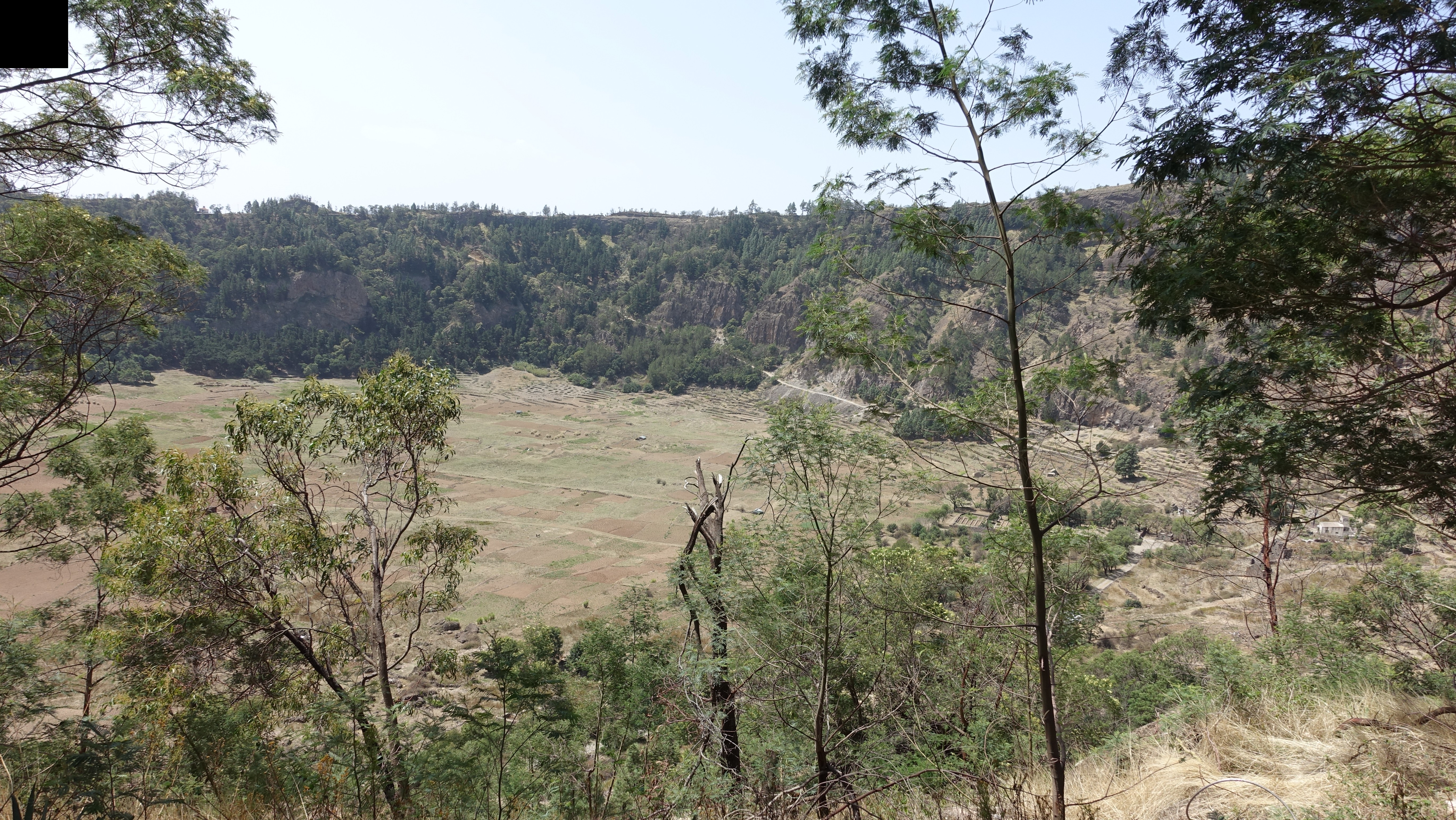
- Inside the Cova Crater

Highest point
- Elevation: 1,166 m (3,825 ft)
- Listing: List of mountains in Cape Verde
- Coordinates: 17.1077°N 25.0627°W

Geography
- Location within Cape Verde
- Location: east-central Santo Antão

Geology
- Mountain type: Stratovolcano

Climbing
- Easiest route: hiking, dirt road

Cova is a volcanic caldera in the east-central part of the island of Santo Antão in Cape Verde. It is situated at the southwestern end of the municipality of Paul. Its lowest point is 1,166 meters, and the highest point of the crater rim is about 1,500 m. The diameter of the caldera is about 1.0 km. It forms a part of Cova-Paul-Ribeira da Torre Natural Park. The Cova formation dates from between 1.4 million and 700,000 years ago.

The Cova crater benefits from high precipitation values carried by trade winds. At the bottom of the caldera maize and beans are grown. Natural and semi-natural vegetation occupies the crater walls facing north and northeast. South facing walls are covered with a forest of Pinus and Cupressus species. There is a small village in the crater (population 10 at the 2010 census), part of the settlement Cabo da Ribeira.

== See also ==
- List of mountains in Cape Verde
