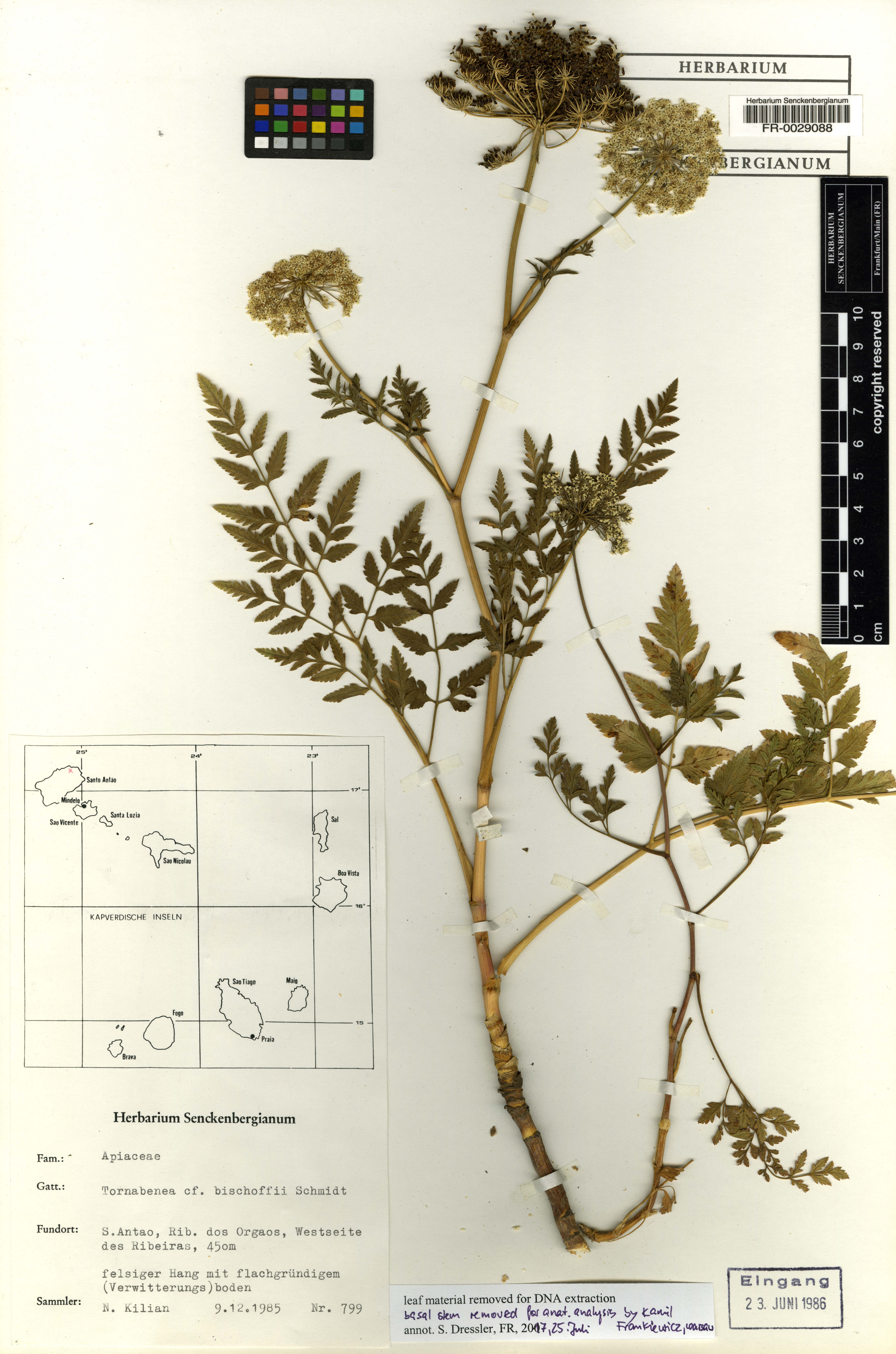

Scientific classification
- Kingdom: Plantae
- Clade: Embryophytes
- Clade: Tracheophytes
- Clade: Spermatophytes
- Clade: Angiosperms
- Clade: Eudicots
- Clade: Asterids
- Order: Apiales
- Family: Apiaceae
- Genus: Daucus
- Species: D. insularis

Binomial name
- Daucus insularis (Parl.) Spalik, Wojew., Banasiak & Reduron

Synonyms
- List: Melanoselinum bischoffii (J.A.Schmidt) A.Chev.; Melanoselinum hirtum (J.A.Schmidt) A.Chev.; Melanoselinum insulare (Parl. ex Webb) A.Chev.; Tetrapleura insularis Parl.; Thapsia bischoffii (J.A.Schmidt) M.Hiroe; Thapsia hirta (J.A.Schmidt) M.Hiroe; Thapsia insularis (Parl. ex Webb) M.Hiroe; Tornabenea bischoffii J.A.Schmidt; Tornabenea hirta J.A.Schmidt; Tornabenea insularis (Parl.) Parl.

= Daucus insularis =

Species of flowering plant

Daucus insularis is a species of flowering plants of the family Apiaceae. The species is endemic to Cape Verde. The species was first described by Filippo Parlatore in 1849 as Tetrapleura insularis.

== Distribution and ecology ==
Daucus insularis occurs on the islands of Santo Antão, São Vicente, São Nicolau, Santiago and Brava.
