= Pombas, Cape Verde =

Pombas
- Settlement
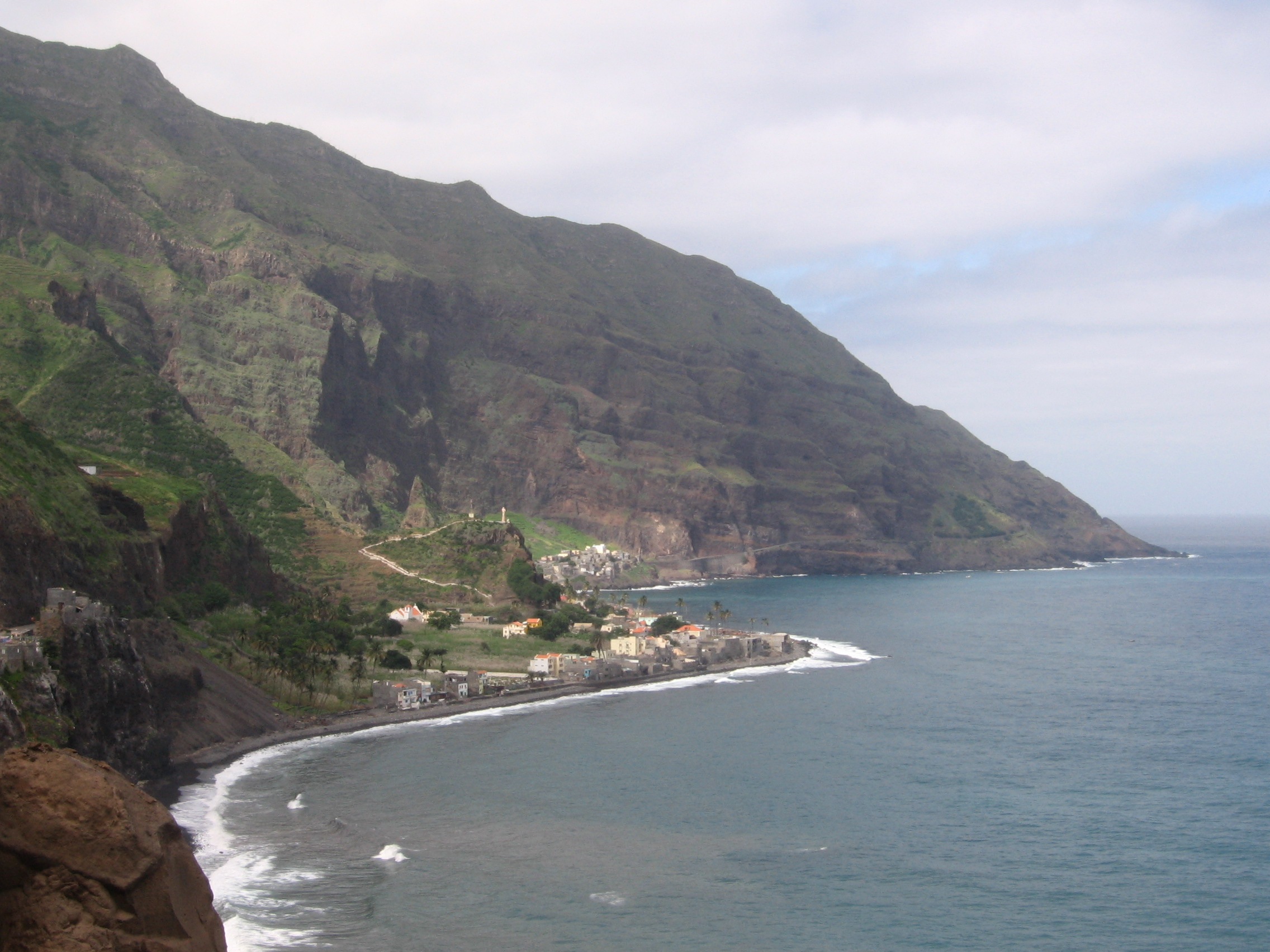

- Location within Cape Verde
- Coordinates: 17.149°N 25.015°W
- Country: Cape Verde
- Island: Santo Antão
- Municipality: Paul
- Civil parish: Santo António das Pombas
- Elevation: 9 m (30 ft)

Population (2010)
  - Total: 1,295
- ID: 12109

Pombas is a city in the northeastern part of the island of Santo Antão, Cape Verde. It is the seat of the municipality Paul. It is situated on the coast, at the mouth of the Ribeira do Paul, 7 km (4.3 mi) southeast of Ribeira Grande and 15 km (9.3 mi) north of the island capital Porto Novo. The national roads EN1-SA02 and EN1-SA03 connect Pombas with Ribeira Grande and Porto Novo, respectively. Pombas was elevated from town to city in 2010.

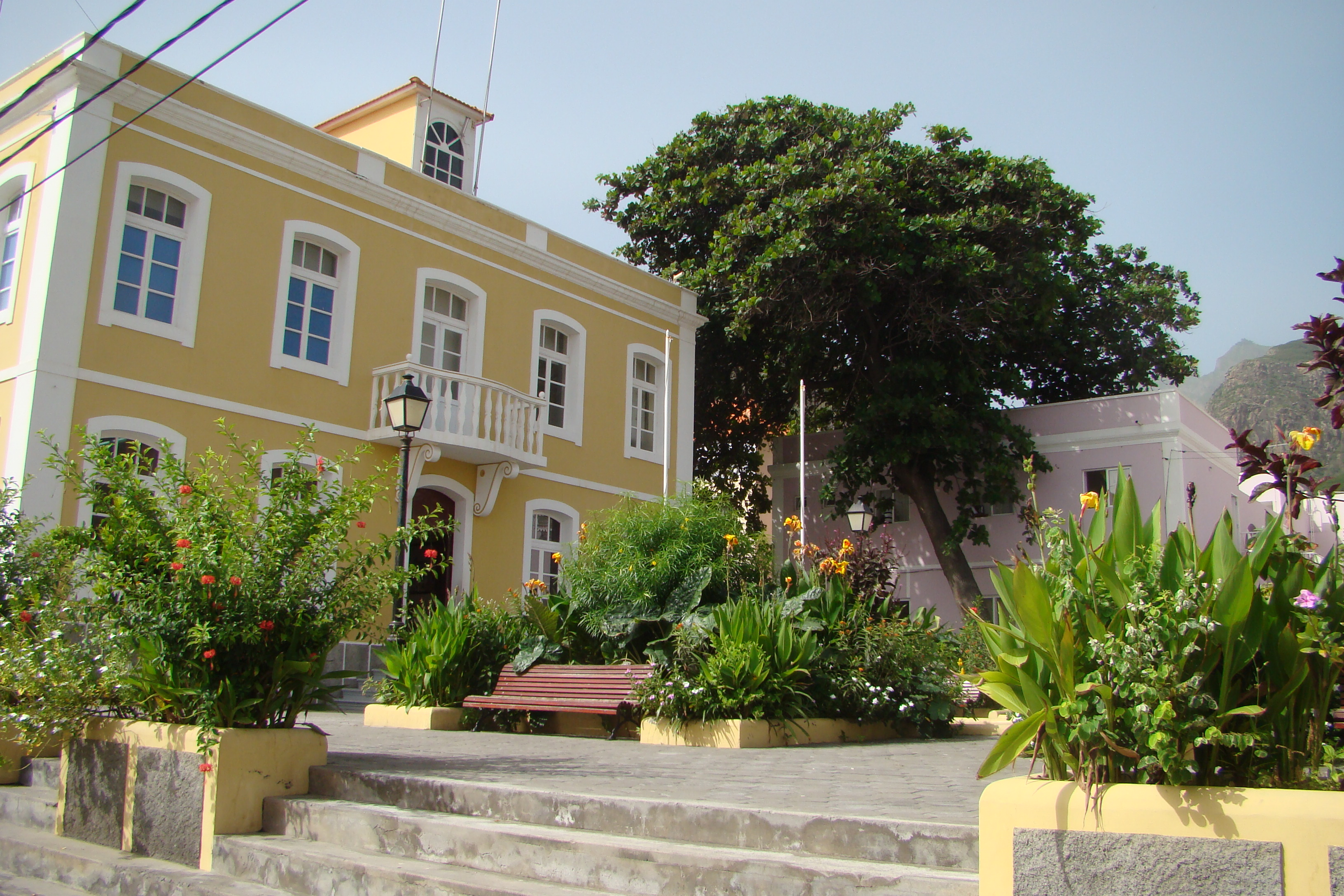
Paul Town Hall

== Demographics ==
- 1990: 1,161
- 2000: 1,796
- 2010: 1,295

== See also ==
- List of villages and settlements in Cape Verde
