= Santo Antão, Cape Verde =

Westernmost and largest of the Barlavento islands of Cape Verde

Santo Antão
Nickname: Ilha das montanhas (island of the mountains)
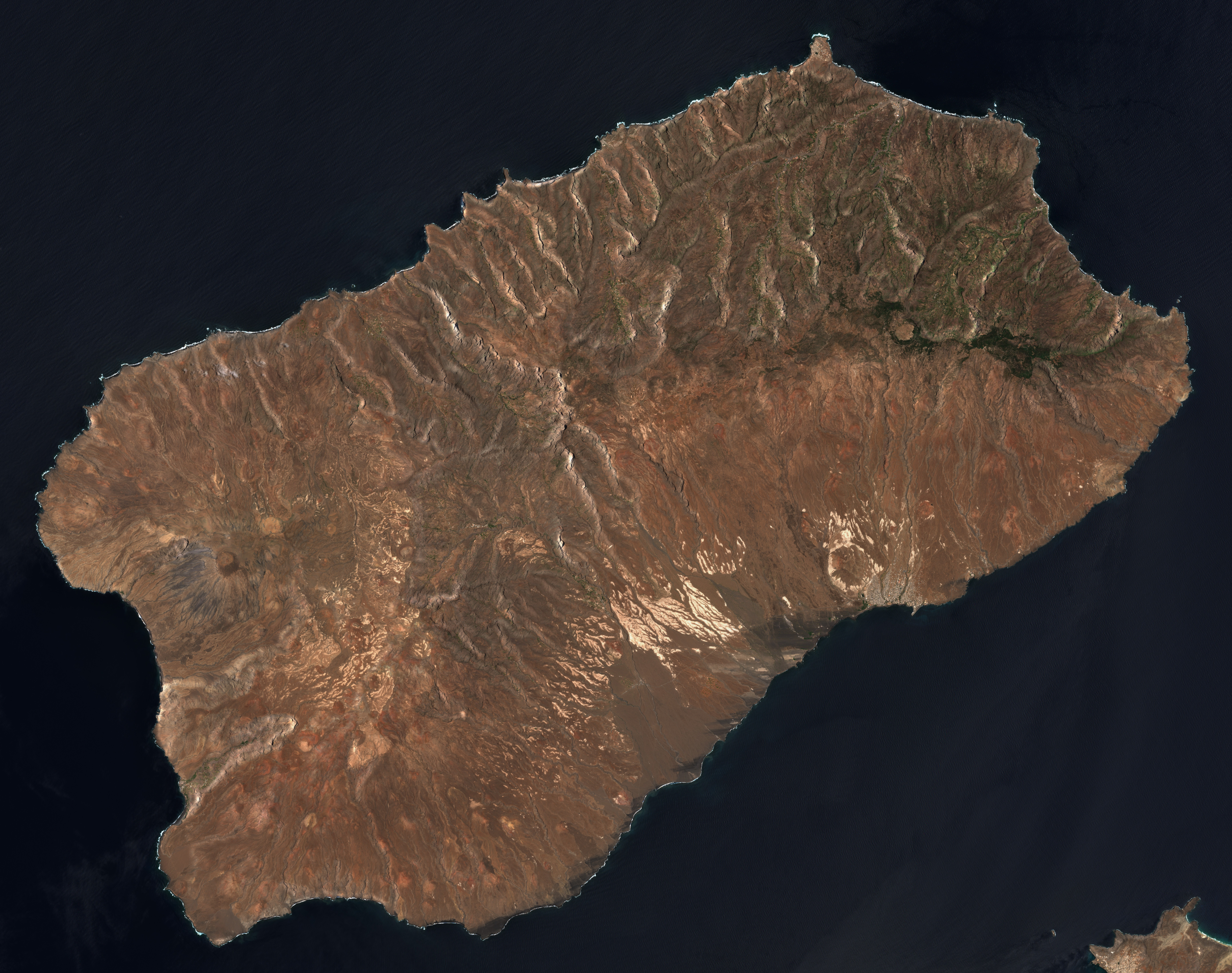

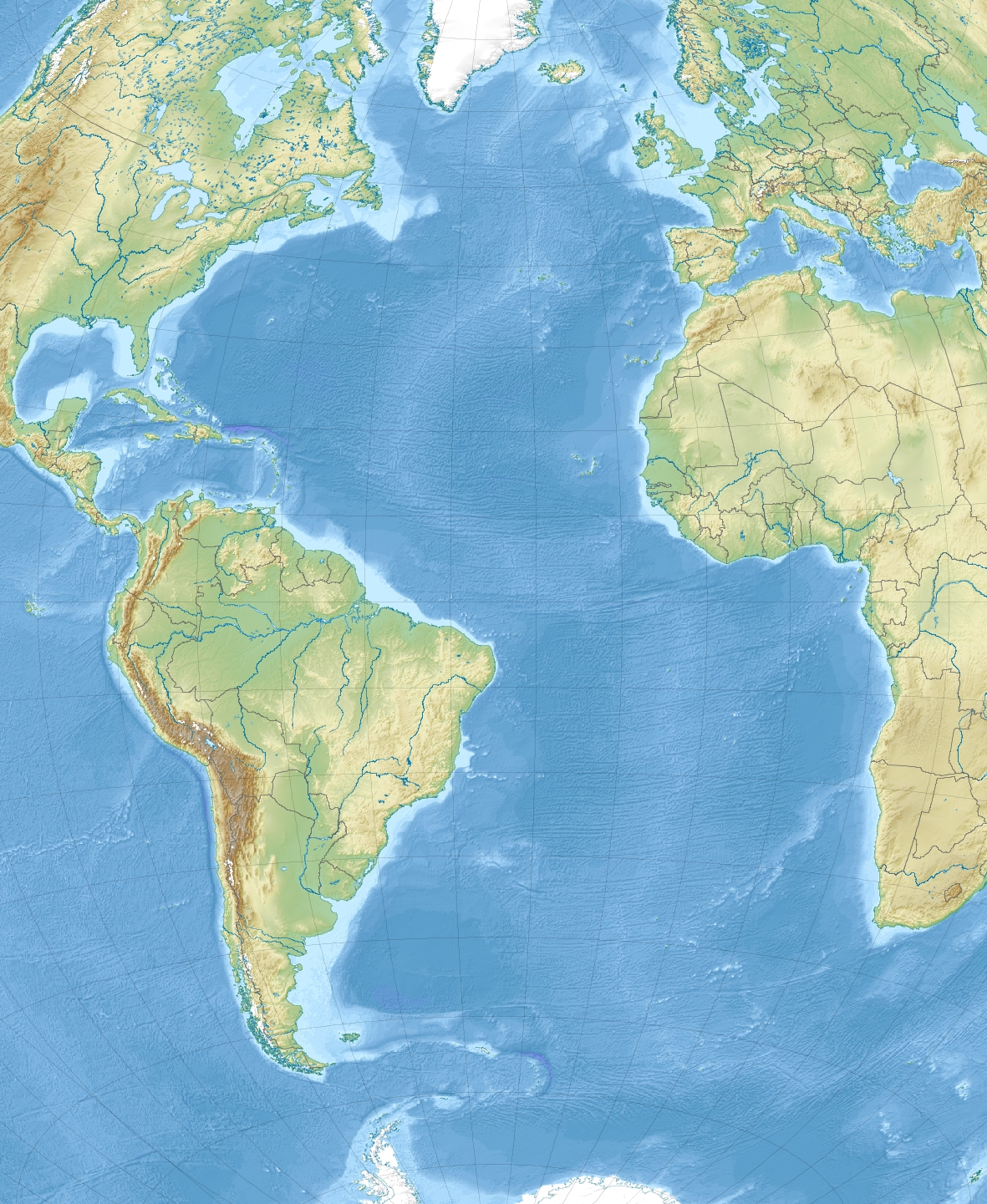
- Location within Cape Verde Location within Atlantic Ocean

Geography
- Location: Atlantic Ocean
- Coordinates: 17.070°N 25.171°W
- Area: 785 km^{2} (303 sq mi)
- Length: 42.8 km (26.59 mi)
- Width: 24.0 km (14.91 mi)
- Highest elevation: 1,979 m (6493 ft)
- Highest point: Tope de Coroa

Administration
- Cape Verde
- Concelhos (Municipalities): Paul, Porto Novo, Ribeira Grande
- Largest settlement: Porto Novo

Demographics
- Population: 38,200 (2019)
- Pop. density: 48.66/km^{2} (126.03/sq mi)

Santo Antão (Portuguese for "Saint Anthony") is the northwesternmost island of Cape Verde. At 785 km^{2} (303 sq mi), it is the largest of the Barlavento Islands group, and the second largest island of Cape Verde. The nearest island is São Vicente to the southeast, separated by the sea channel Canal de São Vicente. Its population was 38,200 in mid 2019, making it the fourth most populous island of Cape Verde after Santiago, São Vicente and Sal. Its largest city is Porto Novo located on the southern coast (population 9,310 in 2010).

== Geography ==
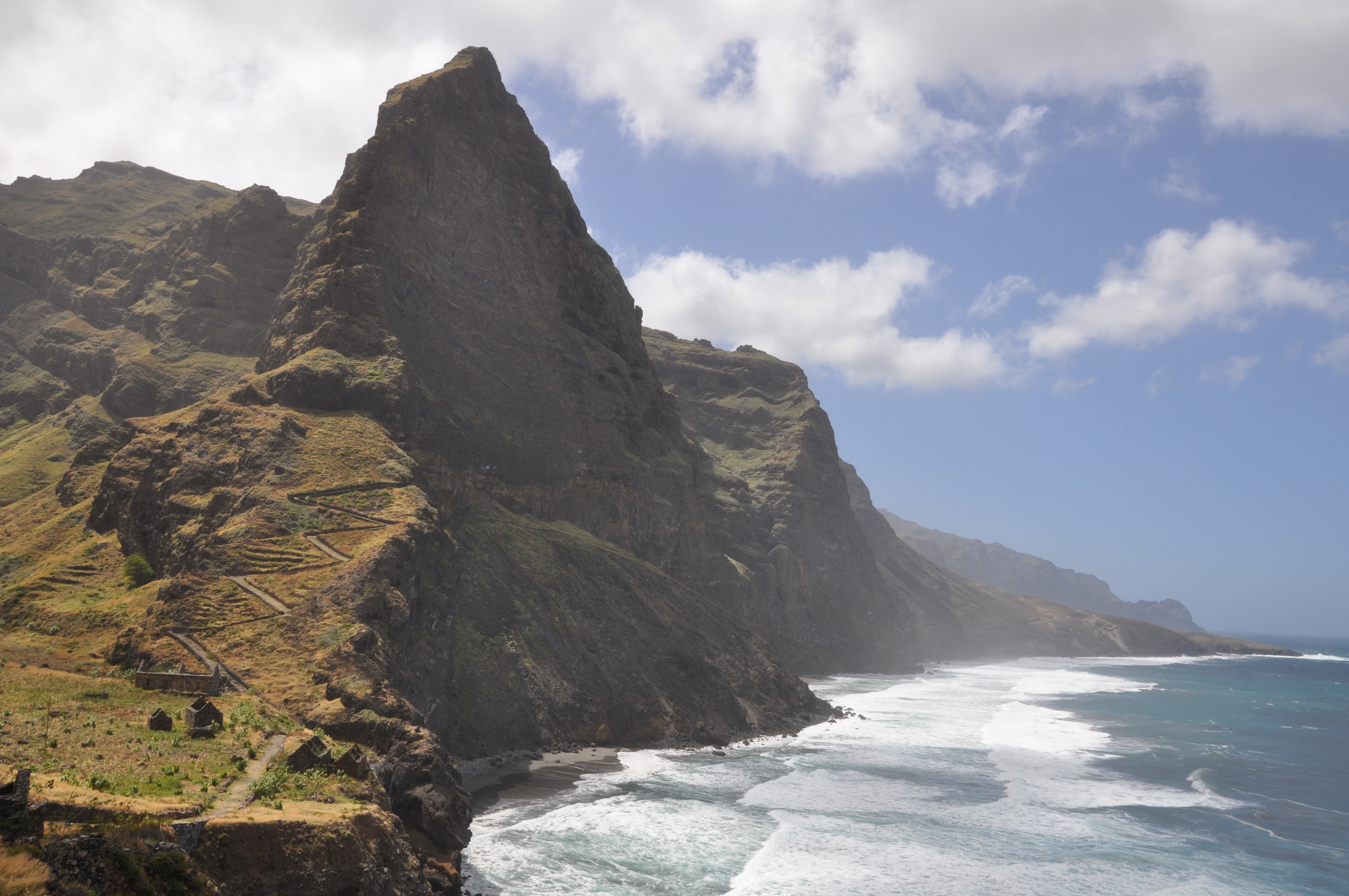
Coastline of Santo Antão

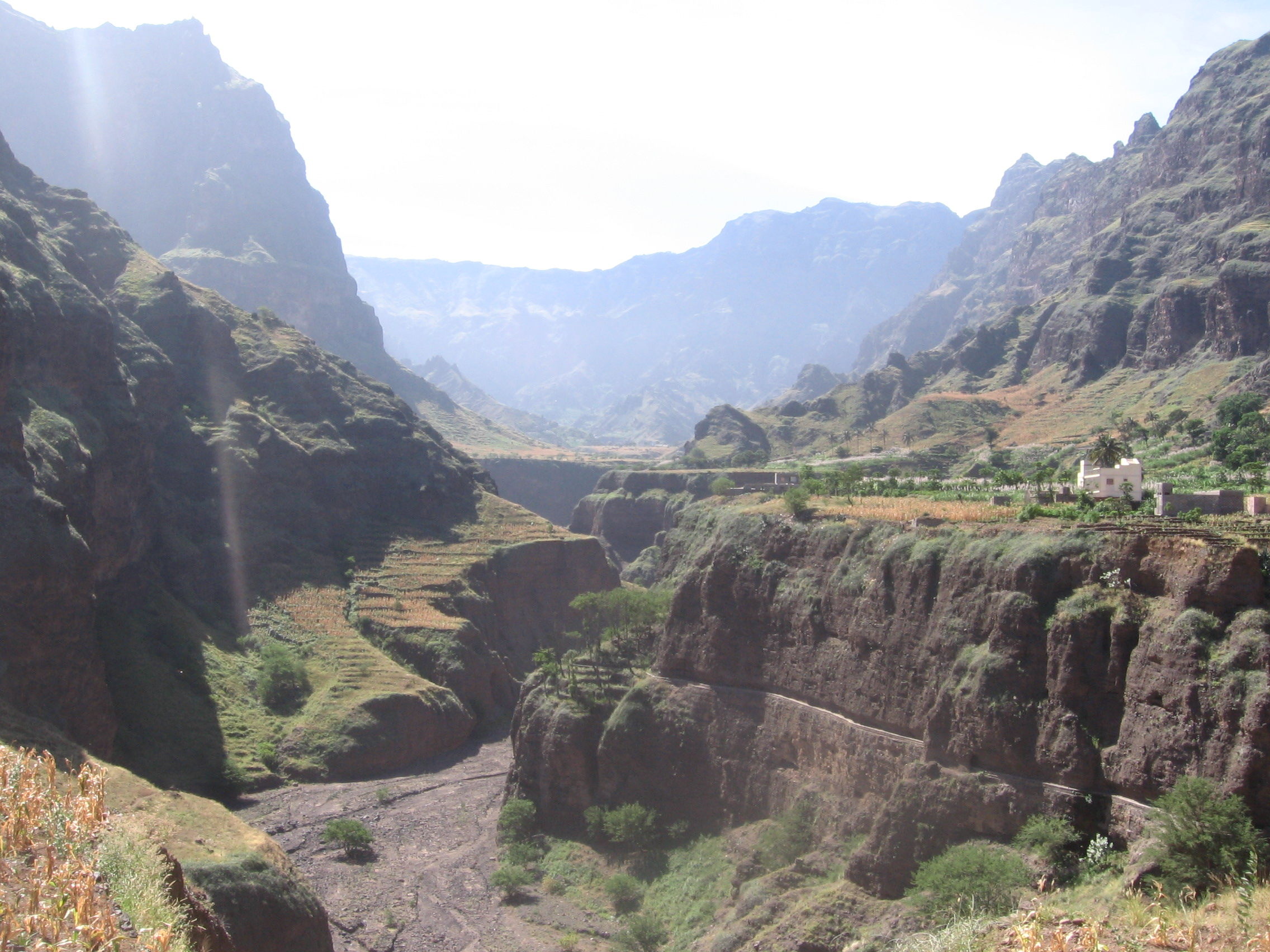
Ribeira da Garça

Santo Antão is 42.75 km (26.56 mi) long (east-west) and 23.97 km (14.89 mi) wide (north-south). The island is of volcanic origin and very mountainous, characterized by two high plateaus and several steep river valleys. The southern part of the island has a desert climate, while the northeast and the higher elevations are semi-arid.

=== Rivers ===
The main rivers of Santo Antão are:

- Ribeira de Alto Mira
- Ribeira da Cruz
- Ribeira da Garça
- Ribeira Grande
- Ribeira da Janela
- Ribeira do Paul
- Ribeira das Patas
- Ribeira da Torre

=== Mountains ===
The tallest mountain is Tope de Coroa, reaching an elevation of 1,979 m. Other high mountains on the island are Monte Tomé (1,863 m), Gudo de Cavaleiro (1,810 m), Monte Moroços (1,767 m) and Pico da Cruz (1,584 m).

=== Climate ===
Santo Antão island has a hot desert climate (Köppen climate classification: BWh) in Sinagoga and Porto Novo and a cold semi-arid climate (Köppen climate classification: BSk) in Espongeiro. The island features very balanced temperatures year round higher on the slopes (~ 800 metres ASL) to cool highland subtropical steppe climate BskL above 1,000 metres ASL. The average annual temperature on the coast is about 23 °C (73 °F), decreasing to some 11 to 15 °C (52–59 °F) on the highest grounds. There can be remarkably cool weather in the interior with warmer wet season starting in July and ending in December–January with colder dry season starting in December–January and ending in June. The major climate risk, similarly to other Cape Verdean islands, yet much less pronounced in the higher altitudes due to better ability in gaining moisture from clouds, is drought.

Climate data for Espongeiro, central highland of the island, 1371 metres ASL
Month	Jan	Feb	Mar	Apr	May	Jun	Jul	Aug	Sep	Oct	Nov	Dec	Year
Mean daily maximum °C (°F)	15.5 (59.9)	15.3 (59.5)	15.9 (60.6)	16.3 (61.3)	17.2 (63.0)	17.9 (64.2)	19.0 (66.2)	20.0 (68.0)	20.3 (68.5)	19.8 (67.6)	18.5 (65.3)	16.5 (61.7)	17.7 (63.9)
Daily mean °C (°F)	13.2 (55.8)	12.8 (55.0)	13.2 (55.8)	13.6 (56.5)	14.5 (58.1)	15.3 (59.5)	16.3 (61.3)	17.3 (63.1)	17.7 (63.9)	17.4 (63.3)	16.0 (60.8)	14.4 (57.9)	15.1 (59.2)
Mean daily minimum °C (°F)	10.9 (51.6)	10.4 (50.7)	10.6 (51.1)	10.9 (51.6)	11.9 (53.4)	12.8 (55.0)	13.7 (56.7)	14.7 (58.5)	15.1 (59.2)	15.0 (59.0)	13.6 (56.5)	12.3 (54.1)	12.7 (54.9)
Average rainfall mm (inches)	24 (0.9)	4 (0.2)	4 (0.2)	1 (0.0)	0 (0)	0 (0)	20 (0.8)	82 (3.2)	105 (4.1)	55 (2.2)	31 (1.2)	25 (1.0)	351 (13.8)
Source: Climate-Data.ORG

Climate data for Sinagoga, far northeastern part of the island, 0 metres ASL
Month	Jan	Feb	Mar	Apr	May	Jun	Jul	Aug	Sep	Oct	Nov	Dec	Year
Mean daily maximum °C (°F)	23.3 (73.9)	23.1 (73.6)	23.6 (74.5)	24.1 (75.4)	24.9 (76.8)	25.6 (78.1)	26.4 (79.5)	27.4 (81.3)	27.6 (81.7)	27.4 (81.3)	26.4 (79.5)	24.3 (75.7)	25.3 (77.5)
Daily mean °C (°F)	21.4 (70.5)	21.2 (70.2)	21.5 (70.7)	21.9 (71.4)	22.7 (72.9)	23.6 (74.5)	24.3 (75.7)	25.4 (77.7)	25.8 (78.4)	25.5 (77.9)	24.4 (75.9)	22.6 (72.7)	23.4 (74.1)
Mean daily minimum °C (°F)	19.6 (67.3)	19.3 (66.7)	19.5 (67.1)	19.8 (67.6)	20.6 (69.1)	21.7 (71.1)	22.3 (72.1)	23.5 (74.3)	24.1 (75.4)	23.7 (74.7)	22.5 (72.5)	21.0 (69.8)	21.5 (70.7)
Average rainfall mm (inches)	14 (0.6)	5 (0.2)	1 (0.0)	0 (0)	0 (0)	0 (0)	11 (0.4)	44 (1.7)	128 (5.0)	44 (1.7)	26 (1.0)	18 (0.7)	291 (11.3)
Source: Climate-Data.ORG

Climate data for Porto Novo, centre-south of the island, 17 metres ASL
Month	Jan	Feb	Mar	Apr	May	Jun	Jul	Aug	Sep	Oct	Nov	Dec	Year
Mean daily maximum °C (°F)	24.0 (75.2)	23.4 (74.1)	24.1 (75.4)	24.6 (76.3)	25.3 (77.5)	26.2 (79.2)	27.3 (81.1)	27.9 (82.2)	27.6 (81.7)	27.5 (81.5)	27.0 (80.6)	25.2 (77.4)	25.8 (78.4)
Daily mean °C (°F)	22.0 (71.6)	21.6 (70.9)	22.0 (71.6)	22.3 (72.1)	23.0 (73.4)	24.1 (75.4)	25.0 (77.0)	25.9 (78.6)	26.0 (78.8)	25.8 (78.4)	25.0 (77.0)	23.4 (74.1)	23.8 (74.8)
Mean daily minimum °C (°F)	20.1 (68.2)	19.8 (67.6)	19.9 (67.8)	20.1 (68.2)	20.8 (69.4)	22.1 (71.8)	22.7 (72.9)	23.9 (75.0)	24.4 (75.9)	24.2 (75.6)	23.0 (73.4)	21.6 (70.9)	21.9 (71.4)
Average rainfall mm (inches)	7 (0.3)	2 (0.1)	1 (0.0)	0 (0)	0 (0)	0 (0)	4 (0.2)	28 (1.1)	86 (3.4)	31 (1.2)	17 (0.7)	15 (0.6)	191 (7.6)
Source: Climate-Data.ORG

== History ==
The island was discovered in 1461 or 1462 by Diogo Afonso, together with the islands of São Vicente and São Nicolau. Settlement of the island started in the first half of the 16th century. The main settlement was Ribeira Grande. Other settlements such as Ponta do Sol, Pombas and Porto Novo developed in the 19th century.

In 1732 the Municipality of Santo Antão was created, with its seat in the town Ribeira Grande. In 1867 this was divided into the municipality of Paul (covering the area of current Paul and Porto Novo) and the municipality of Ribeira Grande. These were merged in 1895 into one municipality. The municipalities of Paul and Ribeira Grande were recreated in 1917. The municipality of Porto Novo was created in 1962 when the parishes of São João Baptista and Santo André were separated from the older Municipality of Paul.

== Population ==
In the 1830s, the estimated population of Santo Antão was 24,000.

Population of Santo Antão (1940—2015)
Year	Population
1940	35,977
1950	28,379
1960	33,953
1970	44,623
1980	43,321
1990	43,845
2000	47,124
2010	43,915
2015	40,547
2019	38,200

== Economy ==
Fishing and agriculture are the main industries on the island.

=== Agriculture ===
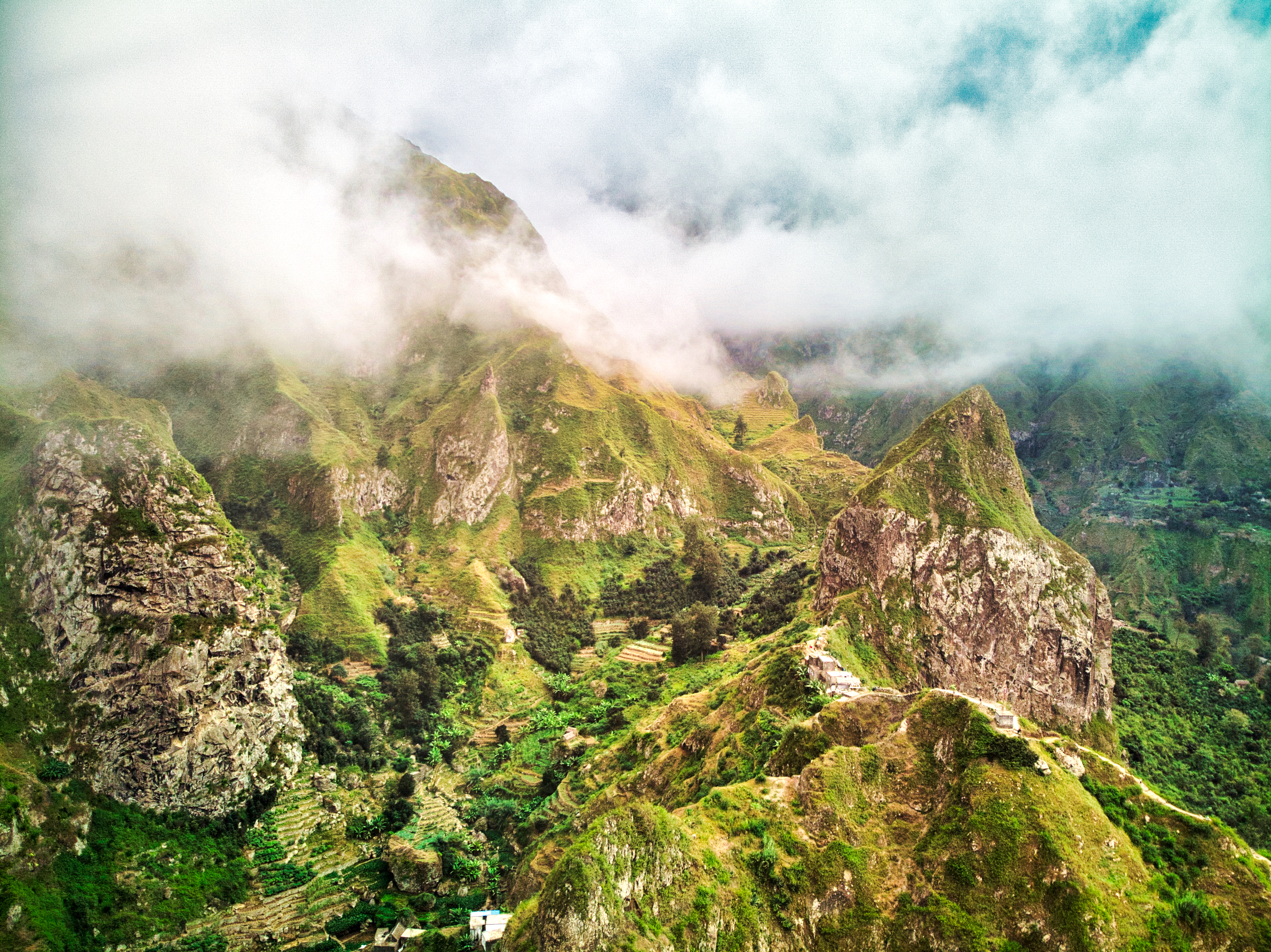
View of the mountains of Vale do Paúl, where planted terraces can be seen.

The island's agriculture products include sugar cane, yams, cassava, bananas, mangoes, and grain. The main product on the island is a kind of rum known as grogue. Mills continue to distill grogue in the Paul Valley.

Due to its mountainous nature, most of the island's plantations are done in terraces, obviating the use of machinery and requiring immense manual labor. Recently, some experiences using drip irrigation have been taking place in order to mitigate the drought conditions.

The exportation of many of the island's agriculture products to other islands has been prohibited for nearly two decades because of the millipede (Spinotarsus caboverdus) blight, but the quarantine was lifted in 2008.

=== Tourism ===
Tourism is becoming one of the most dominant industries on the island. There has been some investment in Rural tourism infrastructures. Hiking, Trekking and Cultural tourism account for most of the touristic offer of this island.

== Administrative divisions ==
The island is divided in three municipalities, which are subdivided into civil parishes:

- Paul CV-PA
  - Santo António das Pombas
- Porto Novo CV-PN
  - São João Baptista
  - Santo André
- Ribeira Grande CV-RG
  - Nossa Senhora do Rosário
  - Nossa Senhora do Livramento
  - Santo Crucifixo
  - São Pedro Apóstolo

== Nature ==
Santo Antão has 50 endangered species of flora which has the most number in the nation. Several flora found in the island that are also found in some parts of the archipelago includes Aeonium gorgoneum, Artemisia gorgonum, Campanula jacobaea, the Conyza species of feae, pannosa and varia, Echium stenosiphon, Kickxia webbiana, Lavandula rotundifolia, Limonium braunii, Micromeria forbesii, Sonchus daltonii, Capeverdean navelwort (Umbilicus schmidtii) and Verbascum capitis-viridis. Flora found only in the island include Tornabenea insularis and ribeirensis.

Santo Antão has different species of birds including the Cape Verde (Iago) sparrow, reptiles including the Cape Verde wall gecko and insects including the spider Tetragnatha torrensis, the moth Scopula paneliusi and the water bear Echiniscus clavispinosus. The island does not have a lot of animal life comparing to other islands. Along its shores, most of the marine life are within Canal de São Vicente.

== Culture ==
Other than Portuguese (official language), the majority of the population speaks Cape Verdean Creole.

== Notable people ==
- Jorge Ferreira Chaves (1920–1981), Portuguese architect
- Leão Lopes (b. 1948), writer, professor and entertainment director
- Gabriel Mariano, essayist, novelist and poet
- Luís Romano de Madeira Melo, composer
- Manuel de Novas, songwriter
- Roberto Duarte Silva (1837–1889), chemist
- Antoninho Travadinha, violinist
- Dina Salústio, teacher, poet, writer and journalist

== See also ==
- Charles Darwin volcanic field
