= São Nicolau Regional Football Association =

- Founded: c. 1982
- Locations: Ribeira Brava; Estádio João de Deus Estádio Orlando Rodrigues
- Affiliations: Cape Verdean Football Federation
- Website: Official website

São Nicolau Regional Football Association (Portuguese: Associação Regional de Futebol de São Nicolau, abbreviation: ARFSN,) is a football (soccer) association covering the island of São Nicolau. It is headquartered in the island capital of Ribeira Brava The association is one of six in Cape Verde that covers only one municipality. It is the sublevel of the Capeverdean Football Federation.

The championship only has a single division where seven clubs participate, a club with the most points promotes into the National Championships.

== History ==
The association was founded in 1982, a few years after independence. Formerly consisted of four clubs, it later raised to five, six in 2003 and seven since 2004. Since 2015, the association is the remaining four associations, which contains only a single level football competition.

== Organization ==
The association also organizes and functions the regional championships, the Cup, the Super Cup and the Opening Tournament, commonly as the Association Cup (equivalent to the two-tier cup in other countries which includes the League Cup). The association has eight registered clubs, one is a non-participant Calejão, the regional champion competes in the National Championships each season.

- São Nicolau Island Championships

== Registered clubs ==
The region's registered clubs as of October 2017 include.

Club	Location	Founded	Registered
Académica da Preguiça	Preguiça	c. 2005	2012
AJAT'SN	Tarrafal de São Nicolau	2003	2004
SC Atlético	Ribeira Brava	1977	c. 1982
FC Belo Horizonte	Juncalinho, Carriçal		
SC Caleijão	Caleijão		
Praia Branca	Praia Branca		
Ribeira Brava	Ribeira Brava		c. 1982
FC Talho	Talho		
Ultramarina de Tarrafal	Tarrafal de São Nicolau	1965	c. 1977
