= 2010–11 in Cape Verdean football =

Football in Cape Verde
- Season: 2010–11

Men's football
- 2011 Cape Verdean Football Championships: CS Mindelense

In the 2010–11 season of competitive football (soccer) in Cape Verde: No Cape Verdean Cup took place that year.

== Diary of the season ==
- No competition from the Brava Island League, Cup or the Opening Tournament
- December 7 Beira-Mar do Tarrafal of Santiago celebrated its 25th anniversary
- February 6–11: No sports competitions due to the parliamentary elections that took place
- Sport Sal Rei Club won their 8th title for Boa Vista
- Vulcânicos won their 8th title for Fogo
- Onze Unidos won their 9th and recent title for Maio
- Académico do Aeroporto won their 11th title for Sal
- Benfica won their only title for Santiago North
- Boa Vista won their 1st title for Santiago South
- Rosariense Clube won their 3rd and recent title (5th overall for Santo Antão) for Santo Antão North
- Académica do Porto Novo won their 5th title (6th overall) for Santo Antão South
- FC Ultramarina won their 9th title for São Nicolau
- CS Mindelense won their 45th title for São Vicente
- May 1: SC África Show won their only cup title for Boa Vista
- Académica do Sal won their second and recent cup title for Sal
- May 5: Vulcânicos won their cup title for Fogo
- May 14: 2011 Cape Verdean Football Championships began
- May 15: Mindelense defeated Vulcânicos 6-0 and made it the season's highest scoring match
- June 11:
  - Boavista Praia defeated Rosariense 6-0 and made it the season's one of two highest scoring matches
  - Match between Vulcânicos and Sal Rei was cancelled
- June 12: Regular season ends, Académica Porto Novo, Académico do Aeroporto do Sal, Sporting Praia and Mindelense qualified into the playoffs
- June 18: Knockout stage begins
- June 25: Mindelense and Sporting Praia qualified into the finals
- July 2: Championship finals begins
- July 9: CS Mindelense won their 6th national championship title

== Final standings ==
=== Cape Verdean Football Championships ===
CS Mindelense and Académica do Porto Novo were first in each group, second place Group A club Sporting Clube da Praia advanced with 12 points and second place Group B club Académico do Aeroporto advanced with 8 points and third in the most goals numbering 8. Sporting advanced to the finals with 5 goals scored while Mindelense advanced with 2 goals scored away in the first match. Mindelense defeated Sporting with only 0-1 in the first match while the second was scoreless, Mindelense went to win their 8th title.

=== Group A ===
Pos	Team	Pld	W	D	L	GF	GA	GD	Pts
1	CS Mindelense	5	4	1	0	13	1	+12	13
2	Sporting Clube da Praia	5	4	0	1	7	2	+5	12
3	Benfica	5	2	1	1	5	4	+1	8
4	Vulcânicos FC	4	1	1	2	3	9	-6	4
5	FC Ultramarina	5	1	0	4	6	11	-5	3
6	Sal-Rei FC	4	0	0	4	1	8	-7	0

=== Group B ===
Pos	Team	Pld	W	D	L	GF	GA	GD	Pts
1	Académica do Porto Novo	4	2	2	0	11	4	+7	8
2	Académico do Aeroporto	4	2	2	0	8	5	+3	8
3	Boavista	4	2	1	1	9	4	+5	7
4	Onze Unidos	4	1	0	3	4	9	-5	3
5	Rosariense Clube	4	0	1	3	4	14	-10	1

==== Final Stages ====
Semi-Finals				Finals
Sporting Clube da Praia	1	4	5
Académica do Porto Novo	2	0	2	Sporting Clube da Praia	0	0	0
Académico do Aeroporto	1	1	2	CS Mindelense	1	0	1
CS Mindelense	2	0	2

Leading goalscorer: Fufura - 5 goals

=== Island or regional competitions ===
==== Regional Championships ====
Competition	Winners	
Competition	Premier	Second
Boa Vista	Sport Sal Rei Club	
Brava	No competition	
Fogo	Vulcânicos FC	Juventude do Fogo
Maio	Onze Unidos	
Sal	Académico do Aeroporto	
Santiago North Zone	Benfica Santa Cruz	
Santiago South Zone	Boavista FC	Tchadense
Santo Antão North Zone	Rosariense Clube	
Santo Antão South Zone	Académica do Porto Novo	
São Nicolau	FC Ultramarina	
São Vicente	CS Mindelense	São Pedro

==== Regional Cups ====
Competition	Winners
Boa Vista	SC África Show
Brava	No competition
Fogo	Vulcânicos
Maio	Académico 83
Sal	Académica do Sal
Santiago South Zone	Boavista Praia
Santo Antão North Zone	Paulense
Santo Antão South Zone	Not held
São Nicolau	Desportivo Ribeira Brava
São Vicente	Falcões do Norte

==== Regional Super Cups ====
The 2010 champion winner played with a 2010 cup winner (when a club won both, a second place club competed).

Competition	Winners
Boa Vista	
Brava	No competition
Fogo	Canceled
Maio	Onze Unidos
Sal	Académico do Aeroporto
Santo Antão South	Not held
São Nicolau	FC Ultramarina
São Vicente	Not held

==== Regional Opening Tournaments ====
Competition	Winners
Boa Vista	África Show
Brava	No competition
Fogo	
Maio	
Sal	Académico do Aeroporto
Santiago South Zone	
Santo Antão North Zone	Rosariense
Santo Antão South Zone	Académica do Porto Novo
São Nicolau	Belo Horizonte
São Vicente	FC Derby

== Notable debutants ==
- Mailó, 18 year old centre forward

== Transfer deals ==
=== Summer-Fall transfer window ===
The September/October transfer window runs from the end of the previous season in September up to October.

- (Cape Verde) Aires Marques from CS Mindelense to (Portugal) Sertanense F.C.
- (Cape Verde) Ballack from Barcelona to Sporting Clube da Praia
- (Cape Verde) Caló from SC Santa Maria to Sporting Clube da Praia
- (Cape Verde) Figo from Sporting Clube da Praia to Estrela dos Amadores (Tarrafal)
- (Cape Verde) Fredson from (Portugal) Varzim (on loan with (Portugal) Pampilhosa) to Batuque
- (Cape Verde) Kuca from Boavista Praia to (Portugal) SC Mirandela
- (Cape Verde) Patas from Estrela dos Amadores (Tarrafal) to (Portugal) Águias Morada
- (Cape Verde) Sténio from CS Mindelense to (Portugal) C.D. Feirense
- (Cape Verde) Vozinha from Batuque FC to CS Mindelense

== Spring transfer window ==
- (Cape Verde) Mailó from CS Mindelense to FC Ultramarina

== See also ==
- 2010 in Cape Verde
- 2011 in Cape Verde
- Timeline of Cape Verdean football
