= 2014–15 in Cape Verdean football =

Football in Cape Verde
- Season: 2014–15

Men's football
- 2015 Cape Verdean Football Championships: CS Mindelense

The 2014–15 season was the season of competitive football in Cape Verde.

== Diary of the season ==
- September 21: Armindo Oliveira became chairman of CD Travadores
- November 2 - in honor of the 75th anniversary of the club, Boavista FC hosted its Champion's Cup (Taça de Campeoes), a friendly competition and won the special title
- November 15 - the 2014–15 Fogo Island League season begins
- November 23 - Pico do Fogo in the northeast of Fogo erupted resulted in halting the Fogo Premier Division's week 2 for nearly four weeks (see 2014–15 eruption of Fogo)
- December 5 - the Santiago South Zone regional league begins
- December 7 - Celtic da Praia defeated GD Varanda 4-0 and took the number one spot for two rounds
- December 13 - the Santo Antão North Zone regional league begins
- December 14 - the Fogo island season resumed nearly three weeks after the eruption
- December 17 - MOAVE began sponsoring Académica do Mindelo.
- December 20 - the Santiago North Zone regional league begins along with its first phase
- December 21 - Boavista Praia defeated Celtic 0-3 and took the number one spot for the rest of the season
- January 10 - the 2014-15 regional leagues of Boa Vista, Sal and the Santo Antão South Zone season begins
- January 13 - Batuque FC (2013/14 cup winner) defeated FC Derby (2013/14 champion) to win the 2013/14 São Vicente Super Cup.
- January 17 - the 2014–15 São Vicente Island League season begins
- January 23 - Nelson Figueiredo became president of FC Juventude of Sal Island
- January 24 - the 2014-15 regional leagues of Brava and São Nicolau season begins
- February 1 - the 2014–15 Maio Island League season begins
- February 22 - the Sporting Praia-Travadores match originally finished 2-0, the loss caused an aligned dispute, the match finished 0-3 for Travadores and on March 27, the secretary lost Sporting Praia 3 points from its totals.
- March 1 - Paulense became listed champions at week 7 with many points ahead CD Sinagoga
- March 28 - the first phase of the Santiago North Island League ends
- April 1 - Académica do Mindelo celebrated its 75th anniversary of the foundation of the club
- April 4
  - The second phase of the Santiago North Island League begins, this was the last time the second phase was used in the island league.
  - Académica Operaria inside the championship zone with points ahead of África Show and Onze Estrelas
- April 5 - Paulense finished with 27 points and won the sixth island title for Northern Santo Antão and qualified and competed in the national championships.
- April 10 - Boavista Praia listed as regional champions with less than ten points ahead of Sporting Praia.
- April 12 - Spartak defeated Parque Real 12-0 in the Fogo Island Premier Division and was the highest scoring game of any of the island leagues of the season.
- April 13 - Académico 83 finished with 19 points and won their sixth title for Maio and qualified to compete in the national championships.
- April 19:
  - Académico do Aeroporto finished with 20 points and 21 goals scored and won the 12th island title for Sal and qualified to compete in the national championships.
  - Académica do Porto Novo finished with 32 points and won the ninth title for Southern Santo Antão and qualified to compete in the national championships.
  - Spartak d'Aguadinha finished with 44 points and won their first and only island title for Fogo and qualified to compete in the national championships.
  - Parque Real conceded a record of 104 goals in the Fogo Island League, maybe the worst in any of the island leagues in Cape Verean football (soccer).
- April 26:
  - Académica Operária finished with 36 points and won the 19th island title for Boa Vista and qualified to compete in the national championships.
  - Boavista da Praia finished with 43 points and the second title for Southern Santiago and qualified to compete in the national championships.
  - CS Mindelense finished with 38 points and won the 47th island title for São Vicente. As Mindelense was already qualified into the national championships as 2014 winner, the runner-up FC Derby qualified and competed in the national championships.
  - Sporting Brava finished with 28 points and won the second island title for Brava and qualified to compete in the national championships.
  - FC Ultramarina became listed as champions with 34 points ahead of SC Atlético with 27 points
- April 30 - FC Ultramarina finished with 37 points and won the 11th island title for São Nicolau and qualified and competed in the national championships.
- May 3 - Beira-Mar do Tarrafal finished with 12 points in the second and final phase and won their very first title and qualified to compete in the national championships. All qualifiers listed into the national championships.
- May 9:
  - 2015 Cape Verdean Football Championships started.
  - Mindelo's FC Derby defeated Spartak d'Aguadinha 1-4 and became the season's highest scoring match for two weeks
- May 23: Mindelense defeated Sporting Brava 6-0 and made it the highest scoring match of the season
- June 3: The rescheduled first round match (originally for May 10) featuring Académico do Aeroporto and Sporting Brava took place, Académico do Aeroporto defeated that club 2-1
- June 6 - Matxona scored a total of 6 goals which made it the most goals scored by any player.
- June 7 - the national regular season finished, Derby, Boavista Praia, Mindelense and Paulense qualified into the playoffs
- June 20 - The Semifinals began, Paulense played their only one of two semis matches
- June 27 - Mindelense defeated Paulense 2-0 in extra time
- June 28
  - As three goals each were scored by Boavista and Derby in two of its matches, Derby won 5-4 in the penalty shootout and qualified into the finals
  - Semifinals ended, Mindelense and Derby qualified into the finals, it would become the second and most recent finals competition that two clubs came from the same island as well as the same city.
- July 4: A goal draw between Mindelense and Derby was made
- July 11 - Another goal draw between Derby and Mindelense was made, as Mindelense won 3-4 in the penalty shootouts, the club claimed their eleventh and recent national title, the club also qualified into the national championships in the following season.
- August 28: FC Ultramarina celebrated its 50th anniversary of the clun's foundation

== Final standings ==
=== Cape Verdean Football Championships ===
Two number one clubs finished with five wins and without a draw or a loss in each group, Mindelense with 14 goals scored and Derby with 12 goals scored, along with Paulense and Boavista Praia, advanced into the final stages. Mindelense and Derby won the semis while Paulense and Boavista lost and Mindelense and Derby won a goal each in its two matches of the final, In the second leg, Mindelense won the penalty kicks in the last match and claimed their eleventh title.

==== Group A ====
Pos	Team	Pld	W	D	L	GF	GA	GD	Pts
1	FC Derby	5	5	0	0	12	2	+10	15
2	Paulense Desportivo Clube	5	3	1	1	6	3	+3	10
3	Académica do Porto Novo	5	2	1	2	5	5	0	7
4	Académico 83	5	2	0	3	5	9	-4	6
5	Spartak	5	1	0	4	5	9	-4	3
6	Académica Operária	5	0	2	3	2	7	-5	2

==== Group B ====
Pos	Team	Pld	W	D	L	GF	GA	GD	Pts
1	CS Mindelense	5	5	0	0	14	1	+13	15
2	Boavista FC	5	4	0	1	14	4	+10	12
3	Académico do Aeroporto	5	3	0	2	12	9	+3	9
4	FC Ultramarina	5	2	0	3	12	16	-4	6
5	Sporting Clube da Brava	5	0	1	4	5	16	-11	1
6	Beira-Mar	5	0	1	4	3	14	-11	1

==== Final Stages ====
Semi-Finals				Finals
FC Derby	1	2	3
FC Boavista	2	1	3	FC Derby	1	1	2
CS Mindelense	0	2	2	CS Mindelense	1	1	2
Paulense DC	1	0	1

Leading goalscorer: Matxona (Boavista FC) - 6 goals

=== Island or regional competitions ===
==== Regional Championships ====
Competition	Winners	
Competition	Premier	Second
Boa Vista	Académica Operária	
Brava	Sporting	
Fogo	Spartak d'Aguadinha	Juventude
Maio	Académico 83	
Sal	Académico do Aeroporto	ASGUI
Santiago North Zone	Beira-Mar do Tarrafal	
Santiago South Zone	Boavista Praia	Delta
Santo Antão North Zone	Paulense	Beira-Mar
Santo Antão South Zone	Académica do Porto Novo	
São Nicolau	FC Ultramarina	
São Vicente	CS Mindelense	Farense Fonte Filipe

==== Regional Cups ====
Competition	Winners
Boa Vista	Sport Sal Rei Club
Brava	
Fogo	Not held
Maio	Onze Unidos
Sal Island League	GD Palmeira
Santiago South Zone	Boavista FC
Santo Antão North Zone	Paulense
Santo Antão South Zone	Académica do Porto Novo
São Nicolau	Belo Horizonte
São Vicente	CS Mindelense

==== Regional Super Cups ====
The 2014 champion winner played with a 2014 cup winner (when a club won both, a second place club competed).

Competition	Winners
Boa Vista	Académica Operária
Brava	Sporting
Fogo	Canceled
Maio	Académico 83
Sal	Sport Clube Verdun
Santiago South	no competition, cancelled (Note: The super cup match was to featured the champion (and cup winner) Sporting Praia and second placed cup winner Tchadense)
Santo Antão North	Paulense
Santo Antão South	Académica do Porto Novo
São Nicolau	SC Atlético
São Vicente	Batuque FC

==== Regional Opening Tournaments ====
Competition	Winners
Boa Vista	Académica Operária
Brava	No competition, cancelled
Fogo	
Maio	
Sal	Académico do Aeroporto
Santiago South Zone	Desportivo da Praia
Santo Antão North Zone	CD Sinagoga
Santo Antão South Zone	Académica do Porto Novo
São Nicolau	SC Atlético
São Vicente	no competition, cancelled

== Transfer deals ==
=== Summer-Fall transfer window ===
The September/October transfer window runs from the end of the previous season in September up to mid-October.

- (Cape Verde) Fredson, from CS Mindelense to Académica do Mindelo
- (Cape Verde) Panduru from Sport Sal Rei Club to Sporting Praia
- October 9 - (Cape Verde) Sissoko (Admilson Cabral) left Os Garridos and signed to play with Sporting Clube da Praia.

=== Retirements ===
- Dário Furtado (Sporting Praia)
- Vargas (Sporting Praia)

== See also ==
- 2014 in Cape Verde
- 2015 in Cape Verde
- Timeline of Cape Verdean football
