= 2013–14 in Cape Verdean football =

Football in Cape Verde
- Season: 2013–14

Men's football
- 2014 Cape Verdean Football Championships: CS Mindelense

== Diary of the season ==
In the 2013–14 season of competitive football (soccer) in Cape Verde:

- Around October 14 - FC Ultramarina won their recent cup title for São Nicolau
- November: Emanuel de Pina (Loco) or (Ney Loko) became coach for Sporting Brava
- November 15 - the 2013–14 Santiago Island South Zone begins
- November 16 - Paulense celebrated its 32nd anniversary
- November 17 - Desportivo da Praia took the spot for Santiago South for six rounds
- November 23 - the 2013–14 Fogo Island League begins
- December 7 - the 2013–14 São Vicente Island League begins
- December 8 - FC Derby took the lead for a week for São Vicente
- December 14:
  - The 2013–14 Brava Island League begins
  - The 2013–14 Santo Antão Island League (South) begins
  - The 2013–14 São Nicolau Island League begins
  - Mindelense defeated Castilho 0-6 in the São Vicente Premier Division and took the number one spot for 12 rounds
- December 15 - the 2013–14 Maio Island League begins
- December 21:
  - The 2013–14 Boa Vista Island League begins
  - The 2013–14 Santo Antão Island League (North) begins
- January 13: Sporting Clube da Praia took the number one spot for Santiago South for the remainder of the season
- January 18 - the 2013–14 Sal Island League begins
- February 15: The group and calendar schedule for the 2014 National Football Championships was sorted in Praia by the Cape Verdean Football Federation
- March 9 - Académica da Calheta finished with 21 points and won their third and recent title for Maio and qualified into the national championships.
- March 23:
  - Académica do Porto Novo finished with 34 points and won their eight title for Santo Antão South Zone and qualified into the national championships
  - SC Atlético finished with 36 points and won their fourth title for São Nicolau and qualified into the national championships
  - Sporting Clube da Brava finished with 32 points and won their first title for Brava and qualified into the national championships for the first time
- March 29 - Sport Clube Verdun finished with 20 points and won their second title for Sal and qualified into the national championships for the first time in more than thirty years
- March 30:
  - Académica Operária finished with 34 points and won their 18th title for Boa Vista and qualified into the national champions
  - Académica do Fogo finished with 42 points and won their 13th and recent title for Fogo and qualified into the national championships
  - FC Derby finished with 32 points and won their ninth and recent title for São Vicente and qualified into the national championships, Mindelense, champion of the previous national season also qualified
  - Grémio Nhágar won their only regional title for Santiago North Zone and qualified for the first time into the national championships
  - Paulense finished with 22 points and won their 6th title for Santo Antão North Zone
  - Sporting Clube da Praia finished with 44 points and won their 8th and recent title for Santiago South Zone
  - All qualifications into the National Championships listed
- April 5 - National Championships begins
- April 6 - Mindelense defeated Sal Rei's Acádemica Operária 4-0 and made it the highest scoring match up to the last round
- May: FC Ultramarina won the São Nicolau Cup for the season
- May 4
  - Académica Porto Novo defeated Sporting Brava 5-0 and made it the highest scoring match
  - Regular season ends, Académica do Fogo, Académica do Porto Novo, Mindelense and Sporting Praia advanced into the semis
- May 10 - The Semi-finals started
- May 17 - Académica do Fogo and CS Mindelense advanced into the finals
- May 24 - The Finals began
- May 31 - CS Mindelense claimed their 10th national title, the club qualified into the 2015 Cape Verdean Football Championships the following year.
- Early Summer - Tarrafal FC de Monte Trigo was formed, it would participate in the Southern Santo Antão Regional Championships
- July 5 - Boavista Praia celebrated its 75th anniversary, the same date as Independence Day in Cape Verde, it would feature friendly matches with other Cape Verdean clubs in the following season
- August 13 - Spartak d'Aguadinha was coached for a season by Joel de Castro, the club's first and only Portuguese coach

== Final standings ==
=== Cape Verdean Football Championships ===
The first two Group A teams had 7 goals. Académica do Fogo scored the most with 10 goals in the season and had three wins. Mindelense had nine and had four wins and qualified into the semis. Académica do Porto Novo and Sporting Praia lost in the semis, the first without goals and the second with a total of two scored. In the finals, Mindelense defeated Académica Fogo 2-1 in the first leg, the second leg was scoreless and Mindelense claimed their tenth national title and its national title totals superseded Sporting Praia.

==== Group A ====
Pos	Team	Pld	W	D	L	GF	GA	GD	Pts
1	Sporting Clube da Praia	5	4	1	0	7	1	+6	13
2	Académica do Porto Novo	5	2	2	1	7	2	+5	8
3	Grémio Nhágar	5	2	2	1	6	5	+1	8
4	Paulense Desportivo Clube	5	1	1	3	4	6	-2	4
5	FC Derby	5	1	1	3	4	6	-2	4
6	Sporting Clube da Brava	5	0	2	3	3	12	-9	2

==== Group B ====
Pos	Team	Pld	W	D	L	GF	GA	GD	Pts
1	CS Mindelense	5	4	0	1	9	2	+7	12
2	Académica do Fogo	5	3	2	0	10	4	+6	11
3	SC Atlético	5	2	1	2	3	3	0	7
4	Académica da Calheta	5	2	0	3	5	8	-3	6
5	Académica Operária	5	2	0	3	3	9	-6	6
6	Sport Clube Verdun	5	0	1	4	3	7	-4	1

==== Final Stages ====
Semi-Finals				Finals
Sporting Clube da Praia	0	2	2
Académica do Fogo	0	2	2	Académica do Fogo	1	0	1
CS Mindelense	0	3	3	CS Mindelense	2	0	2
Académica do Porto Novo	0	0	0

Leading goalscorer: Sidney (CS Mindelense) - goals

=== Island or regional competitions ===
==== Regional Championships ====
Competition	Winners	
Competition	Premier	Second
Boa Vista	Académica Operária	
Brava	Sporting	
Fogo	Académica do Fogo	Baxada
Maio	Académica da Calheta	
Sal	Sport Clube Verdun	
Santiago North Zone	Grémio Nhágar	
Santiago South Zone	Sporting Clube da Praia	Os Garridos
Santo Antão North Zone	Paulense	Beira-Mar
Santo Antão South Zone	Académica do Porto Novo	
São Nicolau	SC Atlético	
São Vicente	FC Derby	Académica do Mindelo

==== Regional Cups ====
Competition	Winners
Boa Vista	Onze Estrelas
Brava	
Fogo	Not held
Maio	Académica da Calheta
Sal	Juventude
Santiago North Zone	
Santiago South Zone	Sporting Clube da Praia
Santo Antão North Zone	Sinagoga
Santo Antão South Zone	Académica do Porto Novo
São Nicolau	FC Ultramarina
São Vicente	Batuque FC

==== Regional Super Cups ====
The 2013 champion winner played with a 2013 cup winner (when a club won both, a second place club competed).

Competition	Winners
Boa Vista	Sport Sal Rei Club
Brava	Juventude da Furna
Fogo	Unknown
Maio	Académico 83
Sal	Académico do Aeroporto
Santiago South Zone	Sporting Clube da Praia
Santo Antão North Zone	Paulense
Santo Antão South Zone	Académica do Porto Novo
São Nicolau	SC Atlético
São Vicente	Falcões do Norte

==== Regional Opening Tournaments ====
Competition	Winners
Boa Vista	
Brava	Nô Pintcha
Fogo	
Maio	
Sal	Académico do Aeroporto
Santiago North Zone	
Santiago South Zone	
Santo Antão North Zone	Paulense
Santo Antão South Zone	No competition, cancelled
São Nicolau	FC Ultramarina
São Vicente	No competition, cancelled

== Transfer deals ==
=== Summer-Fall transfer window ===
The September/October transfer window runs from the end of the previous season in September up to October.

- Patrick Andrade (or Patrick) from Benfica da Praia to G.D. Ribeirão (outside Cape Verde)
- (Cape Verde) Ká Semedo from Sporting Praia to (Portugal) Vitória Guimaraes B

== See also ==
- 2013 in Cape Verde
- 2014 in Cape Verde
- Timeline of Cape Verdean football
