= Timeline of Cape Verdean football =

1910s – 1920s – 1930s – 1940s – 1950s – 1960s – 1970s – 1980s – 1990s – 2000s

== 1910s ==
1919

=== 1919 ===
- CS Mindelense was the first football (soccer) club to be founded in Cape Verde

== 1920s ==
1922 – 1923 – 1929

=== 1922 ===
- Mindelense became the first registered football and sports club in Cape Verde

=== 1923 ===
- GS Castilho football (soccer) club established on the island of São Vicente
- Sporting Clube da Praia football (soccer) club established, the first on the island of Santiago

=== 1929 ===
- FC Derby football club established
- Sporting Praia became a registered football club

== 1930s ==
1930 – 1931 – 1932 – 1933 – 1934 – 1935 – 1936 – 1937 – 1938 – 1939

=== 1930 ===
- CD Travadores football club established

=== 1931 ===
- Vitória FC football club of Praia established

=== 1936 ===
- GD Amarantes football club of Mindelo established

=== 1938 ===
- CS Mindelense won their first title for São Vicente after defeating Derby

=== 1939 ===
- SC Santa Maria football club established, the first on Sal Island
- Boavista Praia football club established
- Mindelense won their second consecutive title for São Vicente after defeating Derby

== 1940s ==
1940 – 1941 – 1942 – 1943 – 1944 – 1945 – 1946 – 1947 – 1948 – 1949

=== 1940 ===
- Académica do Mindelo football club established
- Mindelense won their third consecutive title for São Vicente

=== 1941 ===
- Mindelense won their fourth consecutive title for São Vicente

=== 1942 ===
- Mindelense won their fifth consecutive title for São Vicente

=== 1943 ===
- Mindelense won their sixth consecutive title for São Vicente

=== 1944 ===
- GD Amarantes won their first tile for São Vicente

=== 1945 ===
- SC Verdun football club of Pedra de Lume, Sal founded
- GD Amarantes won their second consecutive title for São Viente

=== 1946 ===
- Mindelense won their seventh title for São Vicente

=== 1947 ===
- Mindelense won their eighth title for São Vicente and their second consecutive

=== 1948 ===
- Os Garridos football club of São Domingos on Santiago Island founded, the first outside of Praia
- Académica do Mindelo won their first title for São Vicente

=== 1949 ===
- Mindelense won their ninth title for São Vicente

== 1950s ==
1950 – 1951 – 1952 – 1953 – 1954 – 1955 – 1956 – 1957

=== 1950 ===
- Mindelense won their tenth title for São Vicente and their second consecutive

=== 1951 ===
- Mindelense won their eleventh title for São Vicente and their third consecutive

=== 1952 ===
- Sport Sal Rei Club football club founded, the first on the island of Boa Vista
- Mindelense won their twelfth title for São Vicente and their fourth consecutive title

=== 1953 ===
- The first Cape Verdean colonial championships took place, Académica do Mindelo was the first champion
- Vulcânicos, Fogo Island's first football club established

=== 1954 ===
- Mindelense won their first colonial championship title for Cape Verde

=== 1955 ===
- No colonial championships took place

=== 1956 ===
- Sporting Clube da Boa Vista football club established
- Sporting Clube do Porto Novo football club established
- Mindelense won their second consecutive colonial championship title for Cape Verde

=== 1957 ===
No colonial championships for the next three years

== 1960s ==
1960 – 1961 – 1962 – 1963 – 1964 – 1965 – 1966 – 1967 – 1968 – 1969

=== 1960 ===
- Falcões do Norte football club based in Mindelo established
- Mindelense won their third consecutive colonial championship title for Cape Verde

=== 1961 ===
- Sporting Clube da Praia won their first colonial championship title for Cape Verde

=== 1962 ===
- Académica da Praia football club founded
- Mindelense won their fourth colonial championship title for Cape Verde
- Juventude football club of Morro Curral, Espargos, Sal established
- Associação Académica do Fogo, a football (soccer) club established

=== 1963 ===
- Académica do Sal football club established
- Boavista Praia won their only colonial championship title for Cape Verde

=== 1964 ===
- Académica do Mindelo won their second colonial championship title for Cape Verde

=== 1965 ===
- Académica da Praia won their only colonial championship title for Cape Verde

=== 1966 ===
- Mindelense won their fifth colonial championship title in Cape Verde, became the only Cape Verdean club to qualify into the Portuguese Cup later in the year
- São Lourenço FC, based in João Teves founded
  - FC Ultramarina football club based in Tarrafal de São Nicolau founded

Académico do Aeroporto do Sal football club established

=== 1967 ===
- Académica do Mindelo won their last colonial championship title for Cape Verde

=== 1968 ===
- Académica Praia defeated Os Garridos 21-0 which made it the highest scoring match in any of the regional championships to date
- Mindelense won their sixth colonial championship title for Cape Verde
- Botafogo, a football (soccer) club based in São Filipe, Fogo established
- AD Bairro football club founded in Praia, the first to be based in a neighborhood

=== 1969 ===
- Sporting Praia won their last colonial championship title for Cape Verde

== 1970s ==
1970 – 1971 – 1972 – 1973 – 1974 – 1975 – 1976 – 1977 – 1978 – 1979

=== 1970 ===
- No colonial championships took place that season

=== 1971 ===
- Mindelense won their last colonial championship title for Cape Verde, it was also the last club to compete in the 1971 Portuguese Cup

=== 1972 ===
- CD Travadores won their first colonial championship title for Cape Verde
- Celtic da Praia football club founded

=== 1973 ===
- GS Castilho won their only colonial championship title for Cape Verde

=== 1974 ===
- Travadores was the last colonial champion of Cape Verde

=== 1975 ===
- Regional championships occurred, no two winners would elevate into the championship match as it was cancelled
- Cape Verde declared independence from Portugal

=== 1976 ===
- Fogo Island League championships established
- Onze Estrelas football (soccer) club based in Boa Vista established
- África Show football (soccer) club based in Rabil on Boa Vista Island founded
- Onze Unidos football club based in Maio founded
- CS Mindelense won their first national championship title for Cape Verde

=== 1977 ===
- Barreirense football club based in Barreiro, Maio founded
- Mindelense won their second consecutive championship title for Cape Verde
- SC Atlético football club based in Ribeira Brava, São Nicolau founded

=== 1978 ===
- Boa Vista Island League established
- Beira-Mar football club based in Maio established
- No national championship competition held due to that the winner of the Sotavento Islands was undecided to challenge Mindelense, the winner of the Barlavento Islands

=== 1979 ===
- Desportivo da Praia football club founded
- Académica da Calheta do Maio football club founded
- No national championship competition held

== 1980s ==
1980 – 1981 – 1982 – 1983 – 1984 – 1985 – 1986 – 1987 – 1988 – 1989

=== 1980 ===
- SC Morabeza football club based in Brava founded
- Botafogo won their only national championship title

=== 1981 ===
- Académica do Porto Novo football club founded
- Batuque FC football club from Mindelo founded
- Mindelense won their third national championship title
- CS Marítimo do Porto Novo football club established
- Paulense Desportivo Clube of Santo Antão founded

=== 1982 ===
- No national championship competitions took place

=== 1983 ===
- Cutelinho a football (soccer) club established
- Académico Sal Rei (now Académica e Operária) won their only national championship title
- Académico 83 do Porto Inglês football club founded

=== 1984 ===
- Tchadense football club established in Praia
- FC Esperança football club established, since 1996, it is known as Os Sanjoanenses based in Ribeira da Prata
- Derby FC won their first national championship title

=== 1985 ===
- Santiago Island Cup founded, the first to be established in Cape Verde
- Sporting Praia won their first national championship title
- SC Beira-Mar do Tarrafal football club founded
- GD Varanda football club of Praia founded

=== 1986 ===
- No national championship competition took place

=== 1987 ===
- Boavista Praia won their first national championship title
- Corinthians São Vicente football club based in Mindelo established

=== 1988 ===
- Sporting Clube da Brava football club founded
- Mindelense won their fourth national championship title

=== 1989 ===
- Académica do Mindelo won their only national championship title

== 1990s ==
1990 – 1991 – 1992 – 1993 – 1994 – 1995 – 1996 – 1997 – 1998 – 1999

=== 1990 ===
- Desportivo de Assomada football club founded
- Mindelense won their fifth national championship title
- Solpontense FC in Santo Antão founded

=== 1991 ===
- Sporting Praia won their second national championship title
- São Vicente Regional Championships were not held for the season

=== 1992 ===
- Estadio Fontinha becomes Estádio Municipal Adérito Sena in Mindelo
- Mindelense won their sixth national championship title

=== 1993 ===
- Académica do Sal won their only national championship title

=== 1994 ===
- Varandinha of Tarrafal, Santiago's football club founded
- GDRC Fiorentina do Porto Novo football club established
- Travadores won their first national championship title

=== 1995 ===
- Fogo Regional Championships interrupted due to the 1995 eruption of Pico do Fogo
- Amabox Barcelona of Tarrafal, Santiago's football club founded
- Boavista Praia won their second national championship title

=== 1996 ===
- Travadores won their second and recent national championship title for the club

=== 1997 ===
- Porto Novo Cup held its first edition
- Sporting Praia won their third national championship title

=== 1998 ===
- FC Praia Branca football club from São Nicolau founded
- Mindelense won their seventh national championship title

=== 1999 ===
- The Santiago Regional Championships and its cup competition were cancelled for the season
- Sal Island Cup held its first edition
- GD Amarantes won their only national championship title

== 2000s ==
2000 – 2001 – 2002 – 2003 – 2004 – 2005 – 2006 – 2007 – 2008 – 2009

=== 2000 ===
- Maio and Brava Regional Championships were cancelled due to shortage of money
- FC Derby win their second national championship title
- Sal Island SuperCup held its first edition

=== 2001 ===
- Santiago Regional Championships season were not held
- Grémio Nhágar football club founded
- Sal Island Opening Tournament held its first edition
- The São Nicolau Cup, the Super Cup and the Opening Tournament held their first editions
- The São Vicente Cup and Super Cup held their first editions
- Onze Unidos won their only national championship title

=== 2002 ===
- Spartak d'Aguadinha football club based on the island of Fogo founded
- Sporting Praia won their fourth national championship title

=== 2003 ===
- AJAT'SN football soccer club from São Nicolau established
- Scorpion Vermelho football club based in Pedra Badejo founded
- Estádio Marcelo Leitão opened in Espargos
- Académico do Aeroporto do Sal won their only national championship title

=== 2004 ===
- The Santo Antão South Zone season was cancelled
- GD Corôa football (soccer) club based in Brava established
- Sport Sal Rei Club won their only national championship title

=== 2005 ===
- Sporting Praia made their highest point totals of any regional championships with 49 points made for the Santiago South Premier Division, the national record stood for nearly eleven years
- FC Derby won their third and recent national championship title for the club
- Not long after the end of the 2005 São Nicolau season, the association and the federation knew that FC Ultramarina and SC Atlético were fielding ineligible players in every match, all of their points were stripped and became placed 6th and last, this was the only time in West Africa that was done
- Sporting Praia defeated Estância Baixo 13-0 which made the highest scoring championship match to date
- CD São Pedro Apóstolo football club from Santo Antão established

=== 2006 ===
- Santiago North Zone Regional Championships season were not held
- Sporting Praia won their fifth national championship title

=== 2007 ===
- Sporting Praia won their sixth national championship title
- Académica Praia won their only national cup title for Cape Verde

=== 2008 ===
- Estadio Municipal Arsénio Ramos in Sal Rei, Boa Vista opened
- Sporting Praia won their seventh national championship title
- As the National Championships continued into another month having its knockout stage matches rescheduled, the national cup competitions were cancelled

=== 2009 ===
- Boa Vista Island Cup held its first edition
- Valência football (soccer) club established
- Sporting Praia won their eighth national championship title
- Boavista Praia won their first national cup title for Cape Verde

== 2010s ==
2010 – 2011 – 2012 – 2013 – 2014 – 2015 – 2016 – 2017

=== 2010 ===
- São Vicente Association Cup cancelled
- Juventude da Furna football (soccer) club established
- Boavista Praia won their recent national championship title and later their second and recent national cup title for Cape Verde
- Clubs based in the municipality of São Domingos switched from the North to the South Zone of Santiago, the only club listed Garridos would compete in the South Zone's Second Division.

=== 2011 ===
- Brava football (soccer) competitions were not held
- Santo Antão South Zone Cup were cancelled, its Super Cup were cancelled for two seasons due to a smaller club withdrawal
- Onze Estrelas participated in the Boa Vista Island League for the first time
- Mindelense won their eighth national championship title
- No national cup competition took place

=== 2012 ===
- Complexo Desportivo Adega completed, it would be used for training grounds of Sporting and Boavista Praia
- Sporting Praia won their eighth and recent national championship title for the club
- Onze Unidos won their only national cup title

=== 2013 ===
- São Vicente Association Cup cancelled for the next two seasons
- Midelense won their ninth national championship title
- No further Cape Verdean Cup editions took place due to financial and scheduling problems
- Sporting Praia won their only national super cup title

=== 2014 ===
- Mindelense won their tenth national championship title
- The Fogo Regional Premier Division was interrupted from November 23 to December 20 due to the eruption of Pico do Fogo, the Fogo Regional Cup was also cancelled, it probably cancelled the 2013-14 Santiago South Zone Cup on the adjacent island.

=== 2015 ===
- Parque Real directly relegated into the Fogo Second Division, the club concede the most goals in history numbering over 100
- Mindelense won their eleventh national championship title
- The Santo Antão Super Cup held its first edition and the next single island competition within divided association in eight years

=== 2016 ===
- The first Santo Antão Cup took place
- Académica do Porto Novo made a 60 match unbeaten streak which began in 2011 and ended on April 23, it became the longest unbeaten record in Cape Verde
- Varandina (63 points) and Scorpion Vermelho (61 points) of the Santiago North Premier Division made their national record point total of any regional championships for the season exceeding Sporting Praia's 49 points made in 2005
- Mindelense won their twelfth and recent national championship title

=== 2017 ===
- The 2016-17 Santiago North Zone championships (Premier and Second) for the second week of February which were suspended for two weeks due to that the referees needed the salaries for the 17th and the 26th rounds last season and the rounds of the season.
- Derby made a protest in April that Académica do Mindelo was using a goalkeeper with a fake identity. On April 24, the Disciplinary Council of the Cape Verdean Football Federation, removed every points that the fake goalkeeper had played totalling 11 which was 5 matches. Also their positions were dropped from first to fifth and also, their National qualification was stripped.
- Benfica Santa Cruz and some other clubs protested AJAC's round 16 win over Juventus Assomada where AJAC fielded a suspended player, Marco Aurélio, who had received two yellow cards. After the end of the season of the, Santiago North Premier Division, it went into uncertainty until May 11 as the Judicial Council made it official, Benfica de Santa Cruz were crowned Premier Division champions of the North Zone while AJAC was punished and was officially relegated.
  Mindelense was disqualified from further playoff participation in the semis after the first leg match was not held due to that access to Estádio Orlando Rodrigues was locked as no keys were available, the match was later rescheduled, after Ultramarina appealed, the first leg was planned but was later removed, the second leg which was at Mindelo took place
- Sporting Praia won their 10th and recent national championship title

== See also ==
- Timeline of association football
