= 2009 Cape Verdean Cup =

2009 Cape Verdean Cup Taça Nacional de Cabo Verde
Tournament details
- Dates: 20 July–2 August
- Teams: 7

Final positions
- Champions: Académica da Praia
- Runner-up: Académica do Sal

Tournament statistics
- Matches played: 19
- Goals scored: 69 (3.63 per match)

The 2009 Cape Verdean Cup (Taça Nacional de Cabo Verde de 2009) season was the 3rd competition of the regional football cup in Cape Verde. The season started on 20 July and finished with the cup final on 2 August. The cup competition was organized by the Cape Verdean Football Federation (Federação Caboverdiana de Futebol, FCF). Group A matches took place at Estádio Adérito Sena in Mindelo, São Vicente and Group B matches took place at Estádio Marcelo Leitão in Espargos. The final stage containing two semifinal matches and a final were played at Estádio da Várzea. Boavista Praia won their first of two cup title.

A total of nine clubs participated, five in Group A and four in Group B.

== Participating clubs ==
- Sport Sal Rei Club, winner of the Boa Vista Island Cup – played in Group B
- Académica do Fogo, winner of the Fogo Island Cup – played in Group A
- CD Onze Unidos, winner of the Maio Island Cup – played in Group B
- Académico do Aeroporto, winner of the Sal Island Cup – played in Group B
- Boavista Praia, winner of the Santiago South Cup – played in Group B
- Rosariense Clube, winner of the Santo Antão North Cup – played in Group A
- Marítimo Porto Novo – winner of the Porto Novo Cup (or Santo Antão South Cup) – played in Group A
- FC Belo Horizonte, winner of the São Nicolau Cup – played in Group A
- Batuque FC, winner of the São Vicente Cup – played in Group A

== Group stage ==
The top two of each group qualified into the final, they were Batuque FC and Académica do Fogo of Group A and Boavista Praia and Académico do Aeroporto of Group B.

=== Group A ===
Pos	Team	Pld	W	D	L	GF	GA	GD	Pts
1	Batuque FC	4	3	1	0	11	2	9	10
2	Académica do Fogo	4	3	1	0	10	1	+9	10
3	Rosariense Clube	4	2	0	2	10	6	+4	6
4	FC Belo Horizonte	4	1	0	3	5	14	−9	3
5	Marítimo Porto Novo	4	0	0	4	4	17	−13	0

=== Group B ===
Pos	Team	Pld	W	D	L	GF	GA	GD	Pts
1	Boavista da Praia	3	3	0	0	10	1	+9	9
2	Académico do Aeroporto	3	2	0	1	6	3	+3	6
3	CD Onze Unidos	3	1	0	2	5	8	−3	3
4	Sport Sal Rei Club	3	0	0	3	3	12	−9	0

== Semifinals ==
Inside the brackets are abbreviation of the island winner (SS represents Santiago South as the island are divided into two zones) and national championship participant under I.

Team 1	Score	Team 2
Batuque FC (SV)	0–2	Académico do Aeroporto (SL)
Boavista Praia (SS)	2–0	Académica do Fogo (FG))

== Final ==
2 August 2009

Boavista Praia	1–0	Académico do Aeroporto
Félix 89'

Estádio da Várzea
Praia, Santiago

== See also ==
- 2008–09 in Cape Verdean football
- 2009 Cape Verdean Football Championships
