= 2011 Cape Verdean Football Championships =

Cape Verdean Football Championship
- Season: 2011
- Champions: CS Mindelense (8th title)
- Matches played: 31
- Goals scored: 84 (2.71 per match)
- Top goalscorer: Fufura (5)
- Biggest home win: Mindelense, Boavista

The 2011 Cape Verdean Football Championship season was the 32nd of the competition of the first-tier football in Cape Verde. Its started on 14 May and finished on 9 July, later than last year. The tournament was organized by the Cape Verdean Football Federation. CS Mindelense won the 2011 title. No teams would participate in the 2012 CAF Champions League or the 2012 CAF Confederation Cup.

== Overview ==
Boavista was the defending team of the title. A total of 11 clubs participated in the competition, one from each island league and one who won the last season's title. The season had one club short due to that the Brava Island League championships were cancelled, this was the most recent cancellation of a championship from any insular regional competition which led to Group B having one match short and a club had only one bye week, 31 matches from 36 and a 1/3 goal total than last season.

The biggest win were Mindelense (6–0 against Vulcânicos) and Boavista (6–0 against Rosariense), each of them were both matches with 6–0.

== Participating clubs ==

Participating football (soccer) clubs of the 2011 Cape Verdean Football Championships (Cape Verde)
- Boavista FC (Cape Verde), winner of the 2010 Cape Verdean Football Championships
- Sal-Rei FC, winner of the Boa Vista Island League
- Vulcânicos FC, winner of the Fogo Island League
- Onze Unidos, winner of the Maio Island League
- Académico do Aeroporto, winner of the Sal Island League
- Benfica (Santa Cruz), winner of the Santiago Island League (North)
- Sporting Clube da Praia, runner-up of the Santiago Island League (South)
- Rosariense Clube, winner of the Santo Antão Island League (North)
- Académica do Porto Novo, winner of the Santo Antão Island League (South)
- FC Ultramarina, winner of the São Nicolau Island League
- CS Mindelense, winner of the São Vicente Island League

=== Information about the clubs ===
Club	Location	Venue	Capacity
Académico do Aeroporto	Espargos	Marcelo Leitão	8,000
Académica do Porto Novo	Porto Novo	Porto Novo	8,000
Benfica	Santa Cruz	25 de Julho	1,000
Boavista FC	Praia	Várzea	12,000
CS Mindelense	Mindelo	Adérito Sena	8,000
Onze Unidos	Vila do Maio	20 de Janeiro	1,000
Rosariense Clube	Ribeira Grande	João Serra	2,000
Sal-Rei FC	Sal Rei	Arsénio Ramos	500
Sporting Clube da Praia	Praia	Várzea	12,000
FC Ultramarina	Tarrafal de São Nicolau	Orlando Rodrigues	5,000
Vulcânicos FC	São Filipe	5 de Julho	1,000

== League standings ==
=== Group A ===
Pos	Team	Pld	W	D	L	GF	GA	GD	Pts
1	CS Mindelense	5	4	1	0	13	1	+12	13
2	Sporting Clube da Praia	5	4	0	1	7	2	+5	12
3	Benfica Santa Cruz	5	2	1	2	5	4	+1	8
4	Vulcânicos FC	4	1	1	2	3	9	-6	4
5	FC Ultramarina	5	1	0	4	6	11	-5	3
6	Sal-Rei FC	4	0	0	4	1	8	-7	0

=== Group B ===
Pos	Team	Pld	W	D	L	GF	GA	GD	Pts
1	Académica do Porto Novo	4	2	2	0	11	4	+7	8
2	Académico do Aeroporto	4	2	2	0	8	5	+3	8
3	Boavista	4	2	1	1	9	4	+5	7
4	Onze Unidos	4	1	0	3	4	9	-5	3
5	Rosariense Clube	4	0	1	3	4	14	-10	1

== Results ==
Week 1
Home	Score	Visitor	Date
Ultramarina	3 - 1	Sal Rei	15 May
Sporting Praia	1 - 0	Benfica Sta Cruz	15 May
Mindelense	6 - 0	Vulcânicos	15 May
Boavista	0 - 0	Acádemica Porto Novo	14 May
Rosariense	1 - 1	Académico Aeroporto	14 May

Week 2
Home	Score	Visitor	Date
Sporting Praia	0 - 1	Mindelense	21 May
Sal Rei	0 - 1	Benfica Sta Cruz	21 May
Vulcânicos	1 - 0	Ultramarina	22 May
Onze Unidos	2 - 1	Rosariense	21 May
Académico Aeroporto	2 - 2	Acádemica Porto Novo	21 May

Week 3
Home	Score	Visitor	Date
Mindelense	2 - 0	Sal Rei	28 May
Vulcânicos	1 - 2	Sporting Praia	29 May
Benfica Sta Cruz	3 - 2	Ultramarina	29 May
Onze Unidos	1 - 2	Boavista	28 May
Acádemica Porto Novo	5 - 2	Rosariense	28 May

Week 4
Home	Score	Visitor	Date
Benfica Sta Cruz	1 - 1	Vulcânicos	4 June
Ultramarina	1 - 4	Mindelense	4 June
Sal Rei	0 - 2	Sporting Praia	4 June
Académico Aeroporto	3 - 1	Boavista	4 June
Acádemica Porto Novo	4 - 0	Onze Unidos	5 June

Week 5
Home	Score	Visitor	Date
Vulcânicos	canc.	Sal Rei	11 June
Mindelense	0 - 0	Benfica Sta Cruz	12 June
Sporting Praia	2 - 1	Ultramarina	12 June
Boavista	6 - 0	Rosariense	11 June
Onze Unidos	1 - 2	Académico Aeroporto	11 June

== Final Stages ==
Semi-Finals				Finals
Sporting Clube da Praia	1	4	5
Académica do Porto Novo	2	0	2	Sporting Clube da Praia	0	0	0
Académico do Aeroporto	1	1	2	CS Mindelense	1	0	1
CS Mindelense	2	0	2

=== Semi-finals ===
18 June 2011

Sporting Clube da Praia	1:2	Académica do Porto Novo

Estádio da Várzea
Praia
18 June 2011

Académico do Aeroporto	1:2	CS Mindelense

Estádio Marcelo Leitão
Espargos
25 June 2011

Académica do Porto Novo	0:4	Sporting Clube da Praia

Estádio Municipal do Porto Novo
Porto Novo
25 June 2011

CS Mindelense	0:1	Académico do Aeroporto

Estádio Municipal Adérito Sena
Mindelo

=== Finals ===
2 July 2011

Sporting Clube da Praia	0:1	CS Mindelense

Estádio da Várzea
Praia
9 July 2011

CS Mindelense	0:0	Sporting Clube da Praia

Estádio Municipal Adérito Sena
Mindelo

Cape Verdean Football 2011
Champions
CS Mindelense
8th title

== Statistics ==
- Top scorer: Fufura: 5 goals (of Mindelense)
- Biggest wins:

Mindelense 6-0 Vulcânicos (May 15)
Boavista FC 6-0 Rosariense (June 11)

== See also ==
- 2010–11 in Cape Verdean football
