= Mailó =

Cape Verdean footballer

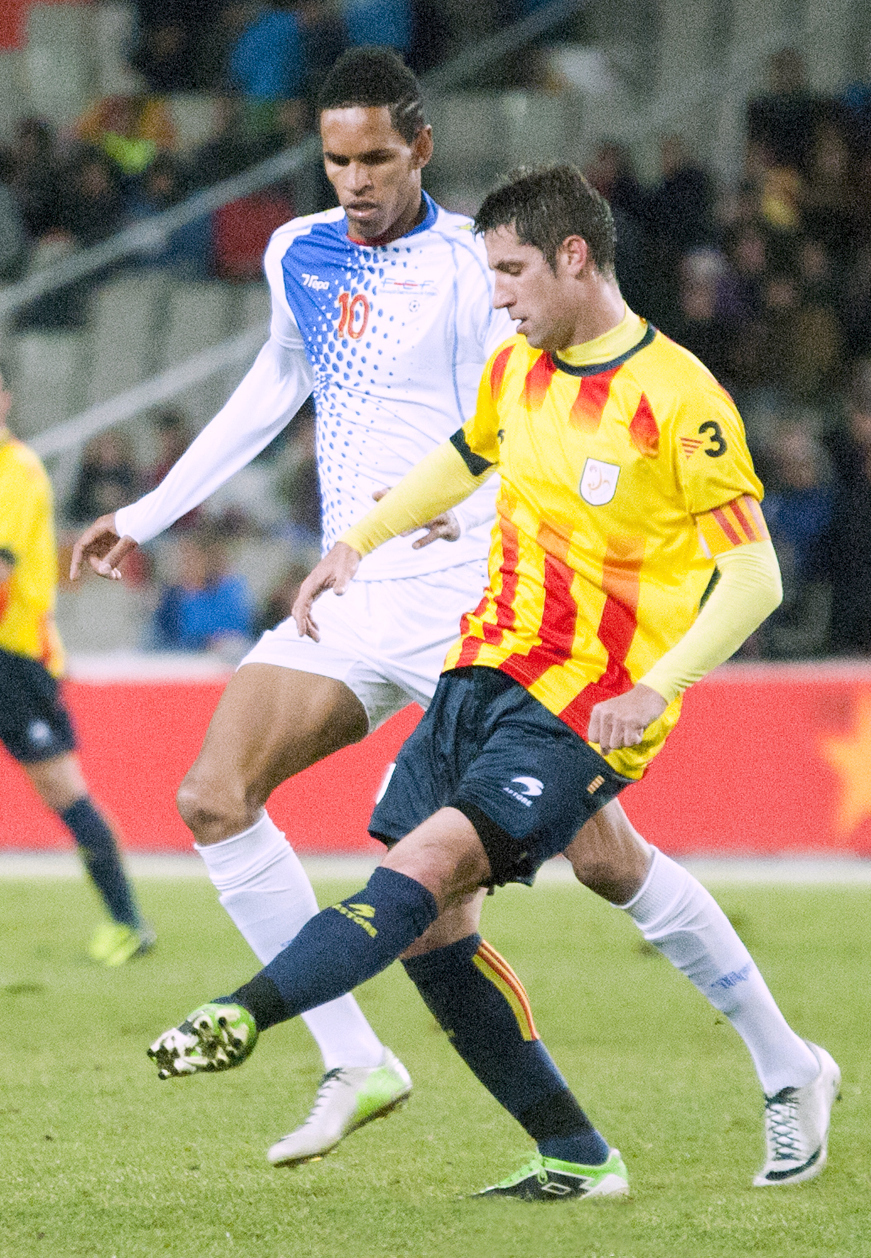

Personal information
- Full name: Mailó da Graça da Cruz
- Date of birth: 10 January 1992 (age 34)
- Place of birth: São Vicente, Cape Verde
- Height: 1.97 m (6 ft 5 1/2 in)
- Position: Centre forward

Team information
- Current team: Sanjoanense

Senior career*
Years	Team	Apps	(Gls)
2010–2011	Mindelense		
2011	Ultramarina		
2012	Mindelense		
2012–2014	Leixões	62	(16)
2014–2016	Belenenses	3	(0)
2015	→ Farense (loan)	19	(4)
2015–2016	→ Covilhã (loan)	23	(6)
2016	Mafra	15	(2)
2016–2017	Varzim	14	(0)
2017–2018	Olhanense	13	(4)
2018–	Sanjoanense	13	(3)
- * Club domestic league appearances and goals as of 1 October 2017

Mailó da Graça da Cruz (born 10 January 1992 in São Vicente), known simply as Mailó, is a Cape Verdean professional footballer who plays for Portuguese club A.D. Sanjoanense as a centre forward.
