= CD Ribeira Brava =

Football club in Cape Verde

Desportivo Ribeira Brava Disportibu Ribéra Brava D'sportiv' R'béra Brava
- Full name: Clube Desportivo Ribeira Brava
- Nickname: Mambrava
- Ground: Estádio João de Deus Lopes da Silva; Ribeira Brava on São Nicolau, Cape Verde
- Capacity: 5,000
- League: São Nicolau Island League
- 2014–15: 4th

There is also a football club a based in Ribeira Brava in the Madeira Islands named Clube Desportivo Ribeira Brava (also as CDRB)

Clube Desportivo Ribeira Brava (Capeverdean Crioulo, ALUPEC or ALUPEK: Disportibu Ribéra Brava, São Vicente Crioulo: D'sportiv' R'béra Brava or Dsportiv' Rbeira Brava) is a football club that currently plays in the São Nicolau Island League in Cape Verde and is the island's third most popular club. It is based in the Ribeira Brava, the island's largest and the capital on the island of São Nicolau. The team won island titles, first in 1990 and another in 2010. The club currently has four championship titles and a cup title for the island.

== Logo ==
Its logo features a Cape Verdean flag in the middle; the logo is encircled in blue then black. It also features two dragons on top and two dragon paws on each side. The club's full name is on the bottom and the anniversary date (in English) is on top.

== History ==
The club was one of the first to win a regional title in 1990. The next three appearances in the national championships (in 2004, 2007 and 2010) would be in the group stages and never headed up to the semi-finals. In 2011, the club won a cup title.

In the 2015–16 season, Ribeira Brava finished 5th, down a position from the previous season. It was the second season that the club had 22 points. Also, it shared 6 wins, 4 draws and losses with FC Ultramarina but the club scored five less goals numbering 16 and both conceded 13. Ribeira Brava did moderate for the 2016–17 season, fifth place they started, the season's first won was on January 21 in a match over Atlético. On February 18, they had a two-match winning streak, as they defeated the least successful clubs of Praia Branca and Talho, lifting them from 6th, where they were after the fourth round, to fourth which gave them a chance for the next eight rounds. Ribeira Brava's last win was over AJAT'SN 0–1 on April 2. The 12th and 14th round matches ended in draws, with a goal each, first with Praia Branca, then with Belo Horizonte which was the final match of the season and recovered the position they had at the start and the fifth round, fifth place and finished for the third straight time with 17 points, 4 wins, 5 draws and fewer goals, 10 equalling to the goals they conceded. Ribeira Brava shared the fewest goals scored in the region with Talho and conceded the second-fewest after SC Atlético.

Ribeira Brava climbed up to the cup finals which will take place in May with Ultramarina Tarrafal. Ultramarina's recent championship win gave Ribeira Brava and entry into the 2017 regional super cup, the club lost the final 0–4. Ribeira Brava qualified into the upcoming super cup later in the year as cup runner-up, the first club ever on the island.

Ribeira Brava started the 2018 season with a 2–0 loss to Talho who previously had a few worst seasons. They recently suffered the worst in the first four rounds, having no wins and draws and not a single goal scored. They conceded 7 goals, the worst on the island. The suffering continued up until the 8th round where a very small relief was made as their match with Talho ended in a draw, without an goals. Ribeira had only a point, only a goal scored and 18 goals conceded. Ribeira Brava finally made a win in 12 championship matches (13 overall) with a 1–2 win over powerful Atlético Ribeira Brava and has four points Ribeira Brava recently lost to Académica on March 11.. On the opposites, Ribeira Brava had 20 goals conceded. Their last draw was on March 21 and were two goals with AJAT'SN, the final match of the season was a 5–0 loss to FC Belo Horizonte. Ribeira Brava finished last place for the season, 8th position for the first time and had 11 matches lost, the worst in club history.

=== Playoff Participation ===
In 1990, the club first qualified into the national championships at the time consisted nothing but the playoff system. The club advanced up to the finals and faced Sporting Clube da Praia, a club from Santiago. The first match was scoreless and the second lost 1–0, this was Ribeira Brava's greatest appearance.

== Stadium ==
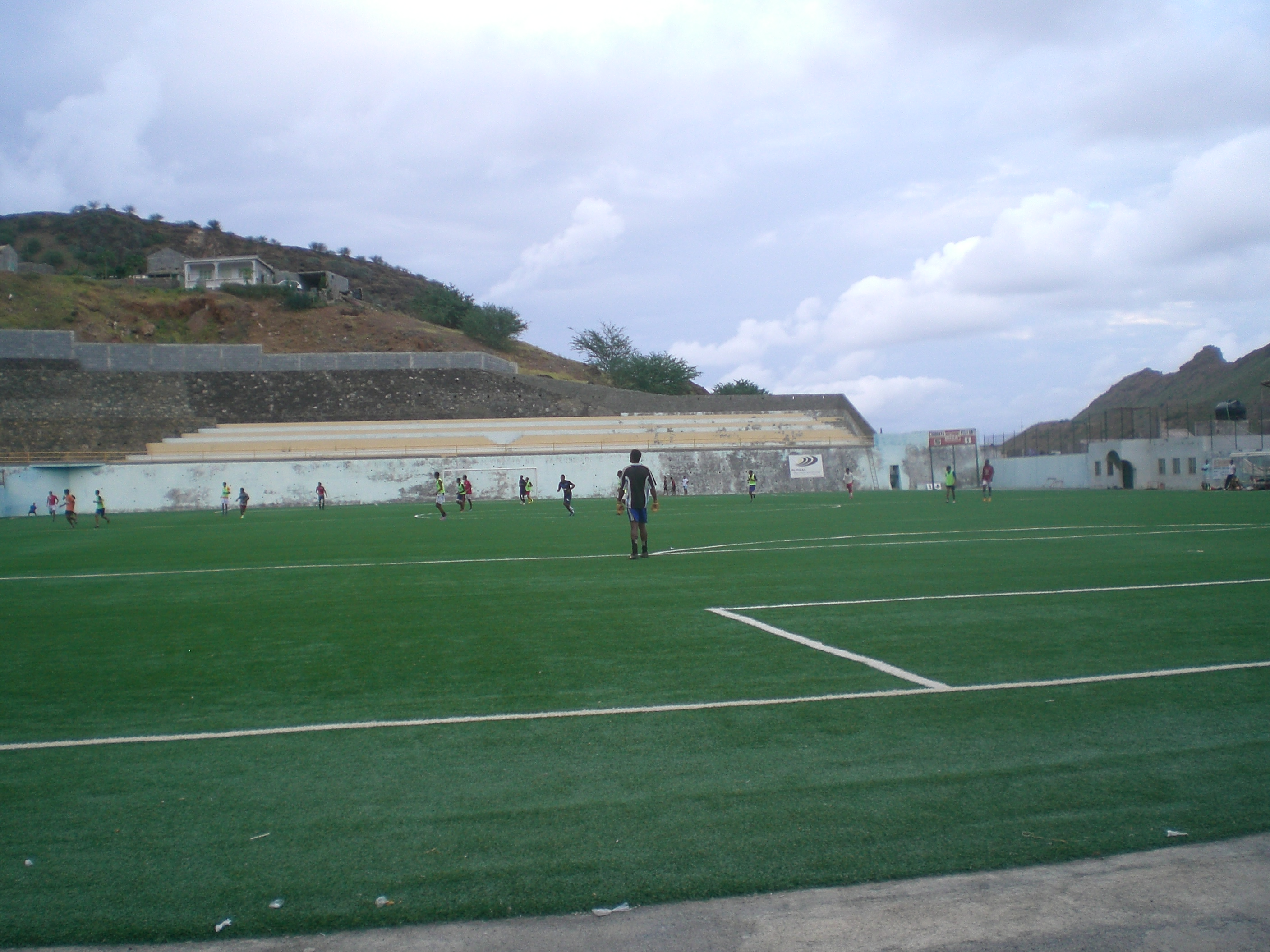
Estádio João de Deus Lopes da Silva, the homefield of Desportivo Ribeira Brava

The club and plays at Estádio João de Deus Lopes da Silva with a capacity of up to 1,000. The club also trains at the stadium. Other club playing at the stadium is SC Atlético. Other clubs playing at the stadium but not based are Belo Horizonte and Talho of the neighboring community.

== Honors ==
- São Nicolau Island League: 4

1989/90, 2004/05, 2007/08, 2009/10

- São Nicolau Cup: 1

2010/11

- São Nicolau Super Cup: 1

2009/10

== League and cup history ==
=== National championship ===
Season	Div.	Pos.	Pl.	W	D	L	GS	GA	GD	P	Notes	Playoffs
2005	1A	5	5	0	3	2	4	9	-5	3	Did not advance	Did not participate
2008	1A	5	5	1	1	3	2	6	-4	4	Did not advance	Did not participate
2010	1B	5	5	1	1	3	6	12	-6	4	Did not advance	Did not participated

=== Island/Regional Championship ===
Season	Div.	Pos.	Pl.	W	D	L	GS	GA	GD	P	Cup	Tour	Notes
2004–05	2	1	12	10	1	1	31	8	+23	31			Promoted into the National Championships
2005–06	2	2	14	8	6	0	36	6	+30	30			
2007–08	2	1	14	-	-	-	-	-	-	-			Promoted into the National Championships
2009–10	2	1	14	-	-	-	-	-	-	-			Promoted into the National Championships
2013–14	2	6	14	4	1	9	15	24	-9	13			
2014–15	2	4	13	6	4	3	13	12	+1	22			
2015–16	2	5	14	6	4	4	16	13	+3	22			
2016–17	2	5	14	4	5	5	10	10	0	17	Finalist		
2017–18	2	8	14	1	2	11	7	32	-25	5			

== Statistics ==
- Best position: 2nd (national)
- Best position at cup competitions: 1st (regional)
- Appearances at a cup competition: 12 (regional)
- Appearances at a regional Super Cup competition: 4
- Highest number of points in a season: 4 (national) – achieved twice
- Highest number of matches lost in a season: 11 (regional), in the 2017–18 season
- Worst position: 8th (regional), in 2018
- Worst season: 2018 (11 losses)
