= Talho =

- Settlement
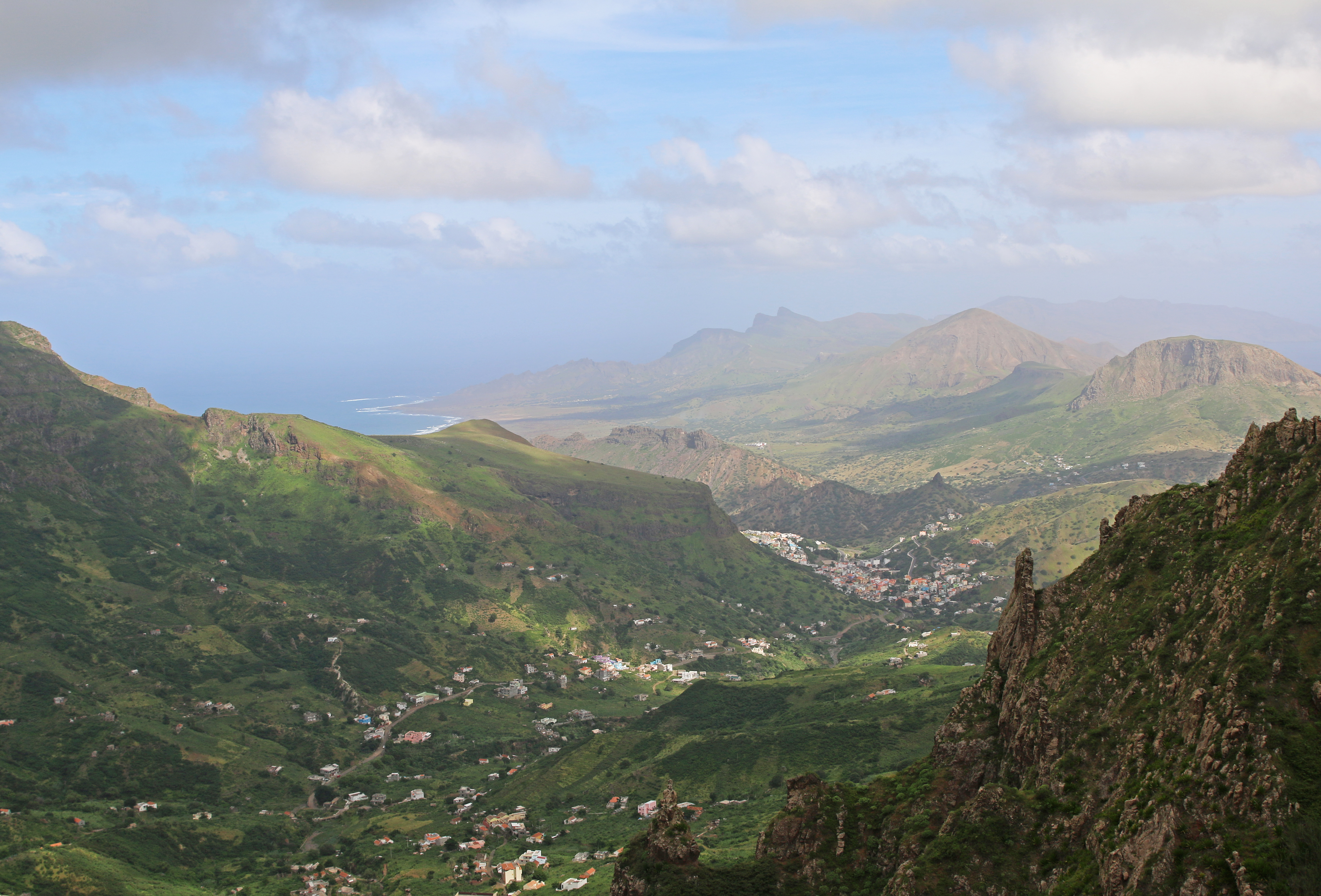
- View of the Valley of Ribeira Brava, in the bottom of the middle part is the village of Talho and on top is the east of the island

- Location within Cape Verde
- Coordinates: 16.618°N 24.310°W
- Country: Cape Verde
- Island: São Nicolau
- Municipality: Ribeira Brava
- Civil parish: Nossa Senhora do Rosário

Population (2010)
  - Total: 308
- ID: 31227

Talho is a settlement in the central part of the island of São Nicolau, Cape Verde. It is located in the valley of Ribeira Brava, 1 km west of the city Ribeira Brava. In 2010 its population was 308. It is part of the municipality of Ribeira Brava and the parish of Nossa Senhora do Rosário.

== See also ==
- List of villages and settlements in Cape Verde
