= São Nicolau Island Championships =

- Founded: 1980s
- Region: São Nicolau Island, Cape Verde
- Number of clubs: 8
- Promotion to: Cape Verdean Football Championship
- Current champions: FC Ultramarina (2016-17)
- Most championships: FC Ultramarina
- Website: Official website

The São Nicolau Island League is a regional championship played in São Nicolau Island, Cape Verde. The winner of the championship plays in Cape Verdean football Championships of each season. The league was formed in the 1980s. The competition is organized by the São Nicolau Regional Football Association (Associação Regional de Futebol de São Nicolau, ARFSN).

Three clubs has ever won titles, the most is SC Atlético with fourteen, FC Ultramarina with twelve and Desportivo Ribeira Brava with three. Ultramarina won a championship every two years between 2007 and 2017 while Atlético Ribeira Brava won every two years between 2012 and 2016. Its 2018 champion is the next first timer in 27 years and will be FC Belo Horizonte of Juncalinho.

== São Nicolau Island League - Clubs 2017-18 ==
The league has eight clubs.

- Académica da Preguiça
- Ajat SN - Tarrafal de São Nicolau
- Atlético São Nicolau - Ribeira Brava
- Belo Horizonte - Juncalinho
- Praia Branca
- Ribeira Brava
- Talho
- Ultramarina Tarrafal

=== Former club ===
- Calejão

== Winners ==
- 1983: SC Atlético
- 1984: unknown, one possible winner one season may be FC Ultramarina or SC Atlético
- 1985: Desportivo Ribeira Brava
- 1986/87 : SC Atlético
- 1988-90: unknown, one possible winner one season may be FC Ultramarina or SC Atlético
- 1990/91 : Desportivo Ribeira Brava
- 1992-93: unknown - one possible winner one seasonmay be SC Atlético
- 1993/94 : SC Atlético
- 1994/95 : SC Atlético
- 1995/96 : FC Ultramarina
- 1996/97 : unknown
- 1997/98: SC Atlético/Desportivo Ribeira Brava?
- 1998/99 : FC Ultramarina
- 1999/00 : SC Atlético
- 2000/01 : FC Ultramarina
- 2001/02 : SC Atlético
- 2002/03 : FC Ultramarina
- 2003/04 : FC Ultramarina
- 2004/05 : Desportivo Ribeira Brava
- 2005/06 : FC Ultramarina
- 2006/07 : FC Ultramarina
- 2007/08 : Desportivo Ribeira Brava
- 2008/09 : FC Ultramarina
- 2009/10 : Desportivo Ribeira Brava
- 2010/11 : FC Ultramarina
- 2011/12 : SC Atlético
- 2012/13 : FC Ultramarina
- 2013/14 : SC Atlético Ribeira Brava
- 2014/15 : FC Ultramarina
- 2015-16 : SC Atlético Ribeira Brava
- 2016–17: FC Ultramarina
- 2017–18: FC Belo Horizonte

=== Performance By Club ===
Club	Winners	Winning years
FC Ultramarina	12 listed (probably 14 total)	1996, 1999, 2001, 2003, 2004, 2006, 2007, 2009, 2011, 2013, 2015, 2017
SC Atlético	9 listed (14 total)	1983, 1987, 1994, 1995, 2000, 2002, 2012, 2014, 2016
Desportivo Ribeira Brava	5 listed	1985, 1991, 2005, 2008, 2010
FC Belo Horizonte	1	2018

=== Performance by municipality ===
Municipality	Winners	Winning years
Ribeira Brava	14 listed	1981, 1983, 1987, 1991, 1994, 1995, 2000, 2002, 2005, 2008, 2012, 2014, 2016, 2018
Tarrafal de São Nicolau	12	1995, 1999, 2001, 2003, 2004, 2006, 2007, 2009, 2011, 2013, 2015, 2017

== See also ==
- São Nicolau Cup
- São Nicolau Super Cup
- São Nicolau Opening Tournament
