= Estádio João de Deus Lopes da Silva =

Sports stadium in São Nicolau, Cape Verde

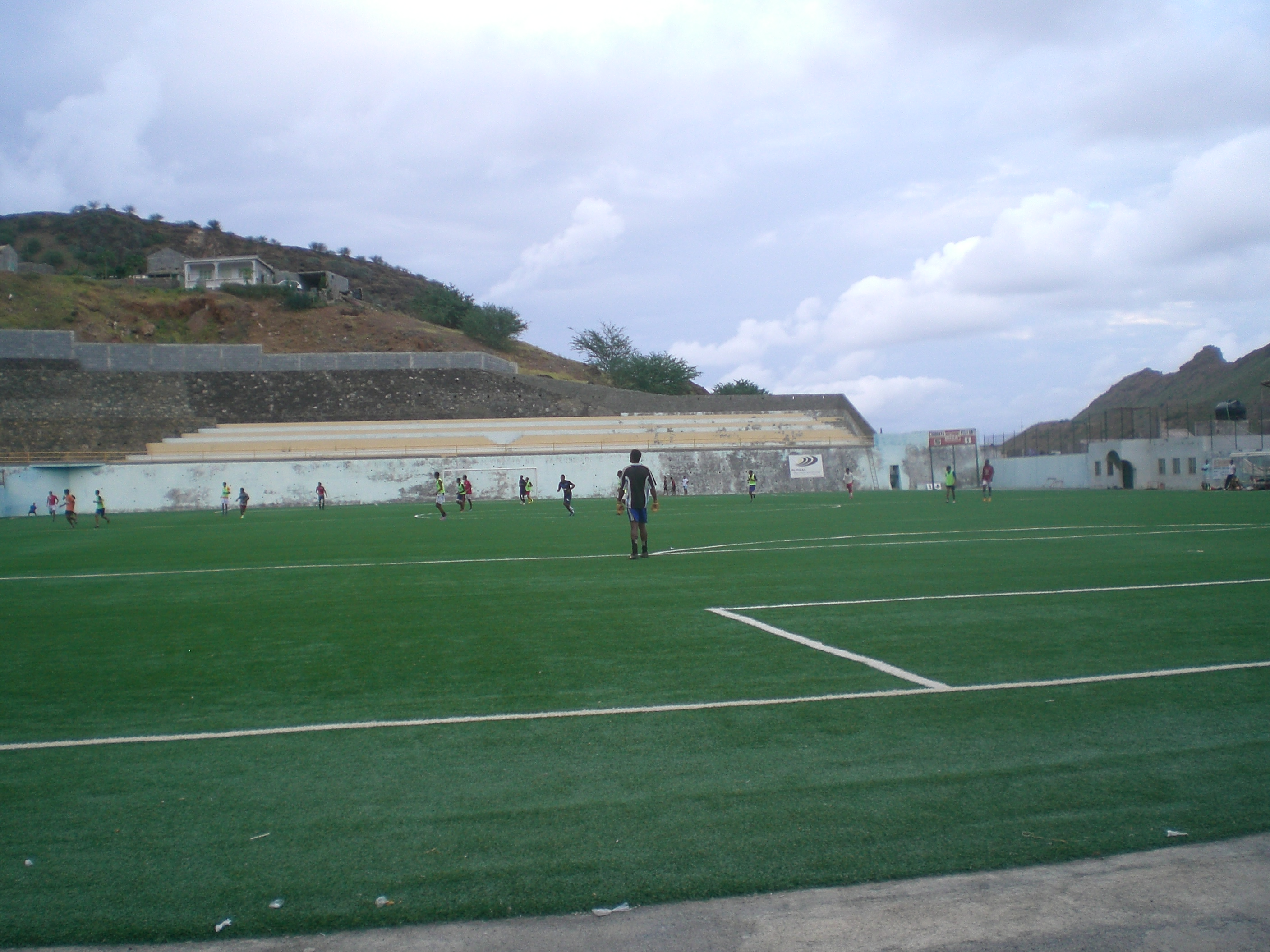

- Location within Cape Verde
- Location: Ribeira Brava, São Nicolau, Cape Verde
- Coordinates: 16.6181°N 24.2996°W
- Capacity: 1,000

Tenants
- SC Atlético; Desportivo Ribeira Brava

Estádio João de Deus Lopes da Silva is a multi-use stadium in São Nicolau, Cape Verde. It is currently used mostly for football matches and is the home stadium of SC Atlético and Desportivo Ribeira Brava. The stadium holds 1,000 people. It is named for João de Deus Lopes da Silva. Its size is 105x68 m and its grass is artificial. The stadium remains to be one of the symbols of the island.

Other clubs playing at the stadium but not based includes Academica da Preguiça, Belo Horizonte of Juncalinho and Talho of the neighboring community.

== History ==
Until 2010, all eight clubs of the island played only at the stadium. It included clubs based in Tarrafal de São Nicolau, until 201- it was only the São Francisco de Assis parish as the island was once a single municipality. All of its competitions were at the stadium at the time.

On March 15, 2014 and April 2016, it was the stadium where SC Atlético were crowned regional champions, on May 7, Atlético fans celebrated the championship and qualification victory, one of the celebrations that were done at the stadium. On April 25, 2015, Ultramarina of Tarrafal de São Nicolau were crowned regional champions at the stadium.

One of the regional cup competitions that took place at the stadium were in 2016 in 2017.

=== National competitions ===
Numerous National Championship finals took place. All of them with Desportivo Ribeira Brava and SC Atlético losing the total number of goals in its two matches. The first was in 1987 with Boavista FC, the second was in 1990 with Sporting Clube da Praia, the third was in 1994 with CD Travadores of Santiago Island, the recent was the 2012 Cape Verdean Football Championships, the first game was held here which ended in a goal draw, Sporting won their ninth and recent title the following week.

Clubs from the west of the island played its national matches until they had their own stadium, the knockout stage which featured Ultramarina had the second leg that took place in 2003 (the second leg of the semis was not played as Cutelinho of Mosteiros on the island of Fogo was expelled from further competitions) and the second leg of the semis in 2004.

After the opening of Tarrafal's stadium in 2010 named Orlando Rodrigues, 2011 was the first year that the national championships did not take place at the stadium with Ultramarina winning the championship. National championship group stage matches took place in 2012, 2014 and 2016 featuring SC Atlético. Now it is being held for the 2018 season with the only time with a club based outside Ribeira Brava, Belo Horizonte.

=== Cancelled continental competition ===
SC Atlético was to play against ES Sahel in the 1995 CAF Cup, as they did not receive the entrant on time, Atlético was disqualified and the match was cancelled.

== See also ==
- List of football stadiums in Cape Verde
