= São Nicolau Super Cup =

- Founded: 2006
- Region: São Nicolau, Cape Verde
- Current champions: Ultramarina Tarrafal (6th time)
- Most championships: Ultramarina Tarrafal (5 times)

The São Nicolau Super Cup is a regional super cup competition played during the season in São Nicolau Island, Cape Verde. The super cup competition is organized by the São Nicolau Regional Football Association (Associação Regional de São Nicolau de Futebol, ARSNF). Its current champions is Ultramarina Tarrafal which now possess the most titles numbering six.

The regional champion competes with the cup champion. If a champion also has a cup title, a cup club who is runner-up qualifies.

The 2018 Super Cup will feature the champion Belo Horizonte from Juncalinho and the cup winner Ultramarina Tarrafal.

== History ==
The first edition took place on November 5, 2006. For several editions, it featured two legs, some of them if a match ended a draw, a second leg was held, it was the only regional super cup in the country that had two legs. Recently again only a single match takes place.

Tarrafal de São Nicolau, at the time, a year after the former municipality once consisted the whole island split in two started to possess a super cup title won by any clubs and was the only one, Tarrafal. Since 2007, Tarrafal de São Nicolau has the most titles won in the region, also since that time, Ultramarina has the most super cup titles won in the region., Ribeira Brava Municipality became second since 2008. In 2010, Ribeira Brava became the only municipality to have more than a club who have won a super cup title. in 2013, Ultramarina's three straight wins put the municipality solely having the most titles. In 2015, Belo Horizonte became the recent club to have a super cup title.

In 2016, the titles won by clubs in the eastern municipality of Ribeira Brava was tied with titles won by clubs in the western municipality of Tarrafal. In 2017, Ultramarina's win put Tarrafal de São Nicolau's title wins, one more than the eastern municipality, for Tarrafal, only one club has titles and is Ultramarina. Until December 23, 2017, never a club qualified as a cup runner up, Ultramarina Tarrafal became the only club to qualify both as champion and cup winner, Ribeira Brava qualified as runner up in the cup competitions. It was the last regional super cup competitions in Cape Verde where it never featured a club that was runner up in the cup competitions. Ultramarina Tarrafal beat Ribeira Brava 8-0 and made it the highest result in the regional super cup history and is one of the highest of any in the nation.

== Winners ==
Season	Winner	Result	Runner-up
2005/06	FC Ultramarina		Belo Horizonte
2006/07	FC Ultramarina	0-0 (3-1 p)	AJAT'SN
2007/08	SC Atlético		Desportivo Ribeira Brava
2008/09	Unknown (Note: The Super Cup match featured Ultramarina, the champion and Belo Horizonte, the cup winner)		
2009/10	Desportivo Ribeira Brava		FC Talho
2010-11	FC Ultramarina		Desportivo Ribeira Brava
2011-12	FC Ultramarina	0-0 (1st leg); 2-1 (2nd leg)	SC Atlético
2012/13	FC Ultramarina		SC Atlético
2013/14	SC Atlético		FC Ultramarina
2014/15	Belo Horizonte		FC Ultramarina
2015/16	SC Atlético		AJAT'SN
2016/17	Ultramarina Tarrafal	8-0	Ribeira Brava^{1}

^{1} Runner up in the cup competition as the regional champion was also a cup winner

=== Performance By Club ===
Club	Winners	Winning years
FC Ultramarina	6	2006, 2007, 2011, 2012, 2013, 2017
SC Atlético	3	2008, 2014, 2016
Belo Horizonte	1	2015
Desportivo Ribeira Brava	1	2010

=== Performance by Municipality ===
Municipality	Winners	Club location	Winners	Winning years
Ribeira Brava	5	Juncalinho	1	2015
Ribeira Brava	5	Ribeira Brava	4	2008, 2010, 2014, 2016
Tarrafal de São Nicolau	6	Tarrafal de São Nicolau	6	2006, 2007, 2011, 2012, 2013, 2017

== See also ==
- São Nicolau Cup
- São Nicolau Island Championships
- São Nicolau Opening Tournament
