= São Nicolau Opening Tournament =

São Nicolau Island Opening Tournament
- Founded: 2002
- Region: São Nicolau Island, Cape Verde
- Teams: 8
- Current champions: SC Atlético (3rd time)
- Most championships: SC Atlético, Belo Horizonte and Ultramarina (3 titles)

The São Nicolau Island Opening Tournament (Portuguese: Torneio de Abertura de São Nicolau, Capeverdean Crioulo, ALUPEC or ALUPEK: Turnéu di Abertura di San Nikolau), is an opening tournament competition (equivalent to a league cup) played during the season in the island of São Nicolau, Cape Verde The competition is organized by the São Nicolau Regional Football Association (Associação Regional de Futebol de São Nicolau, ARFSN). Some seasons featured rounds of one portion, some seasons featured three rounds and two groups with the top club of each group in the final match. It currently consists of seven rounds, a meeting with another club once. The winner with the most points (sometimes in the final) is the winner.

SC Atlético, Belo Horizonte and Ultramarina won the most title numbering three, Talho only won once in 2004. Ultramarina was the second club to win a title in 2003 and Belo Horizonte probably the fourth to win a title in 2007. Atlético is the recent club to win a title for the season. Belo Horizonte had the most in 2011 and 2016, From 2012 to 2015, Ultramarina shared it with Belo Horizonte and up to 2016 three clubs together with Atlético. Belo Horizonte was the leader up to 2017 and three clubs has now three titles won.

Each of the three clubs won nearly 30% of the title total in 2017.

The 2017–18 season has been cancelled due to financial concerns.

== Winners ==
Season	Winner	Runner-up
2001-02	SC Atlético	
2002-03	FC Ultramarina	
2003-04	FC Talho	
2005-06	Unknown	
2006-07	Belo Horizonte	
2008-10	Unknown	
2010-11	Belo Horizonte	
2011-12	FC Ultramarina	
2012-13	Cancelled	
2013-14	FC Ultramarina	
2014-15	SC Atlético	
2015-16	FC Belo Horizonte	
2016-17	SC Atlético	
2017-18	Not held	

=== Performance By Club ===
Club	Winners	Winning years
SC Atlético	3 listed	2002, 2015, 2017
FC Belo Horizonte	3 listed	2007, 2011, 2016
FC Ultramarina	3	2003, 2012, 2014
Talho	1	2004

=== Performance by Municipality ===
Municipality	Winners	Club location	Winners	Winning years
Ribeira Brava	9 listed	Juncalinho	3 listed	2007, 2011, 2016
Ribeira Brava	9 listed	Ribeira Brava	3 listed	2002, 2015, 2017
Ribeira Brava	9 listed	Talho	1	2004
Tarrafal de São Nicolau	3 listed	Tarrafal de São Nicolau	3 listed	2003, 2012, 2014

== See also ==
- São Nicolau Island League
- São Nicolau Cup
- São Nicolau Super Cup
