= SC Atlético =

Sport Club Atlético
- Full name: Sport Club Atlético
- Nickname: Encarnados
- Founded: 9 December 1977
- Ground: Estádio João de Deus Lopes da Silva; Ribeira Brava, São Nicolau; Cape Verde
- Capacity: 5,000
- Chairman: Artemiza Nascimiento
- Manager: Pirico
- League: São Nicolau Island League
- 2016–17: 3rd
| Home colours | Away colours |

Sport Club Atlético (first part, Portuguese meaning: "athletics", Capeverdean Crioulo, ALUPEC or ALUPEK: SK Atlétiku) is an association football club based in Ribeira Brava and plays in São Nicolau Island League and had played in the Premier division in Cape Verde. Its current head is Artemiza Ramos and its coach is Pirico who is since January 2017. Also its honorary president is António Manuel Santos. Its nickname is Encarnados, the same nickname of Portugal's SL Benfica.

SC Atlético is the second most successful football (soccer) club on the island, having won about 20 official regional titles.

== History ==
The club was founded on 9 December 1977. Their first island title was won in 1994 and won their second consecutive in 1995, their recent title win was in 2014. Atlético also has two cup wins, their first was in 2008 and their second and recent in 2014, their first ever Super Cup win was in 2014 and their recent was in 2016, also Atlético has two opening tournament titles, their first was won in 2001 and their second was in 2015 and their recent was in 2017.

In 1995, Atlético was to have their first CAF Cup appearance, the club were to participate in the first round against ES Sahel of Tunisia, as the Cape Verdean Football Federation did not name its entrant in time, the club was disqualified in the first round.

Their worst season was in 2005 when the club fielded ineligible players in every match especially Ultramarina and finished last place as the goals were awarded against them. It was the worst and one the clubs that fielded the most number of ineligible players in West Africa and probably that includes a third of the continent. The next time it happened in Cape Verde was in 2017 to Académica do Mindelo of São Vicente.

In 2007, SC Atlético celebrated its 30th anniversary of the club's foundation.

After winning their first cup title, they made their first appearance in the regional Super Cup and lost to Desportivo Ribeira Brava, the champion. Atlético had no appearance at the Cape Verdean Cup as it was cancelled that season. Atlético's next two appearances at the Super Cup were also unsuccessful, the latter was a loss to FC Ultramarina. After entering as a regional cup winner Atlético finally won the 2014 Super Cup after defeating Ultramarina, the cup winner, their next Super Cup appearance was two years later. Atlético's cup totals was second, shared with Ultramarina from 2014 until 2017 and AJAT'SN since 2016, their totals with AJAT'SN are third in the region.

One of the club's greatest season was the 2015–16 season and finished with 36 points, the club had no loss, their last loss at the regional championships was on 25 April 2015, to FC Ultramarina.

As 2016 regional champion, Atlético faced the cup winner AJAT'SN in the regional Super Cup on 7 January 2017, and defeated that club 3–0 to win their recent Super Cup title. A good start Atlético had for the 2017 season started second. Atlético's 13 match unbeaten streak ended with they lost to Desportivo Ribeira Brava 1–0 on 21 January and were placed fourth and remained to third round and became the club's lowest for the season, then climbed to second after victories to lesser teams, Praia Branca and Talho, they became third afterwards and two draws followed with Belo Horizonte and Preguiça, the second was a scoreless. A match on 22 April, the 12th round defeated the lesser Talho 0–7 and made it the region's highest scoring match, also that time, their championship hopes faded. Académica Preguiça's loss to AJAT'SN handed its second place to Atlético and the club became third again. The final match of the season featured the third place club, Académica da Preguiça and lost the club and handed back the second position to that club and finished third.

Atlético started the 2018 regional season with a loss to Belo Horizonte 2–3 on 6 January, a week later, they made a win over Ribeira Brava, then a draw with Ultramarina Tarrafal in the Island's derby, then the unpredictable, an 0–1 loss to Praia Branca and the club was sixth with 4 points, they had the same points with Talho and Praia Branca, the club had 3 goals scored and Atlético underwent having another worst season since 2005. A chance for a turnaround was made where the club defeated Talho at the fifth round. Their match with Académica Preguiça which was on 10 February was delayed due to its stadium João de Deus had no police or security presence, it was rescheduled a week later and ended in a two-goal draw. Two more sufferable losses came and most of the chances for another title, which would be back to back disappeared for good. Atlético with ailing Ribeira Brava, the unpredictable came as they suffered a 1–2 loss to that club and much of their chance for a back to back championship title was lost as they had 8 points (shared with Praia Branca and Talho) and is fifth place. Next was Ultramarina in the island's derby which ended in a goal draw and has 9 points, there Atlético lost all chances for a back to back regional title. The next two matches will be with Praia Branca of the northwest of the island and nearby Talho.

=== National participation ===
The team had made it to the 1993 playoffs, the team lost all of the two final matches to CD Travadores 2–0 and 2–1.

In the 2002 national championship season, the club's first was a win over the mighty Sporting Praia at the first round, on 25 May at the third round, they had the highest scoring match which was 6–0 over Académica da Brava, the match was the season's highest until made it second on 29 June with Sporting Praia's 9–0 win over Académica Brava, they were first place for a week before dropping their positions to fifth as they would lose to Batuque of São Vicente. A goal draw with Académica do Fogo was followed after their bye week in the fifth round. Their three remaining matches ended in wins. Along with Académica do Fogo and Académico do Aeroporto, the club had 16 points and was third, it was second ranked. From the reintroduction of the group stage in 2003 up until the stage changed in 2016, not a single club would have 16 points. As the national championships became three groups and each club has a six match regular season, still not a single club has over 16 points today. Atlético finished fifth, shared with Académica Fogo and Académico do Aeroporto, they also had 5 wins and a draw, the difference was the club scored 15 goals, fewer than the two Académica affiliates.

In 19 years, the team made it to the 2012 playoffs and challenged Académica do Porto Novo in the semis and defeated 3–0 and 1–0 and challenged Sporting from Praia in the finals, the matches were tied 1 apiece in the first and the second was scoreless, they lost the penalty shootout to Sporting Praia and achieved second place, the team has never claimed national titles.

In 2014, the club finished third with 4 points and had 2 win. Two years later, Atlético also had their recent appearance at the nationals, they had a worst season, Atlético finished 5th with 4 points, a win and a draw, their worst that they conceded 10 goals.

== Rivalry ==
Ultramarina's only main rivalry is FC Ultramarina and is called the São Nicolau derby which started in about the start of the 1990s. One of their recent meetings was in week 1 of the 2015–16 season where they defeated that club.

== Stadium ==
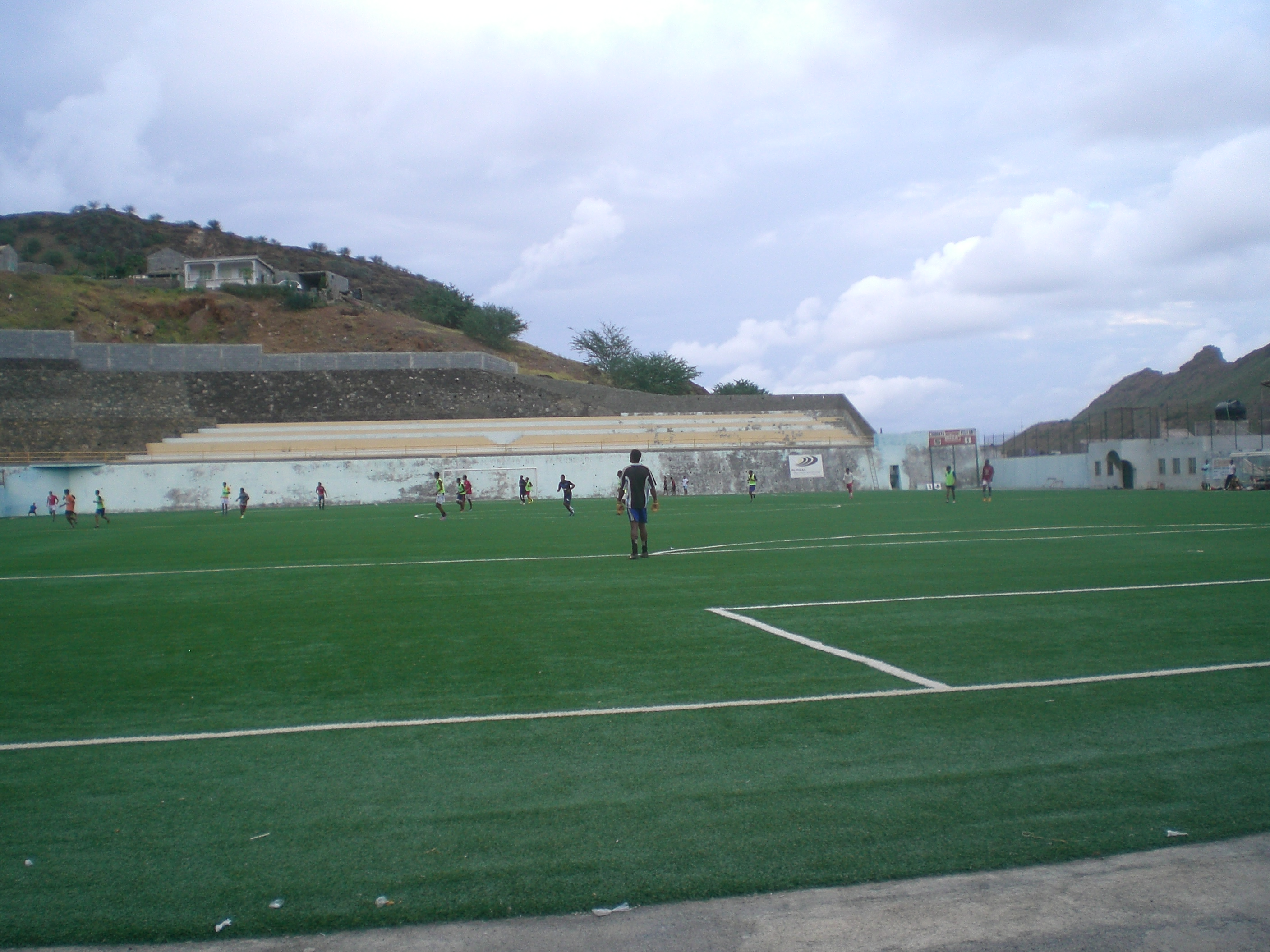
Estádio João de Deus Lopes da Silva, the homefield of SC Atlético

The club and plays at Estádio João de Deus Lopes da Silva with a capacity of once served up to 1,000. The club also trains at the stadium. Other club playing at the stadium is Desportivo Ribeira Brava. Other clubs playing at the stadium but not based are Académica da Preguiça, Belo Horizonte and Talho of the neighboring community.

== Logo ==
Its logo is Benfica based with some differences, a small tree is on top, other features has crest and inside reading "SCA" in the middle, the bottom reads "desporto e fraternidade" ("sports and fraternity") on the bottom, the club is rarely a Benfica affiliate.

== Uniform ==
Home uniform up to mid-2015
Away uniform up to 2015
Home uniform up to November 2016
Away uniform up to April 2017

Its uniform colors are red clothing with black shorts for home matches and red-white striped clothing (three red and four white stripes) with red sleeves and socks and a light blue shorts for away matches.

Its former uniform colours home games were with red T-shirt with white edges at the sleeves and white shorts and a black-white striped T-shirt (the top and bottom are coloured black) with black sleeved and white rims, red shorts and black socks, used up to the end of the 2014–15 season. From mid-2015 to around November 2016, its home uniforms were a red-white striped T-shirt, its left and right edges are coloured red, red sleeves, and the remainder of the clothing red, used during home matches and the away uniform which continued to be used to April 2017 was a white T-shirt with red sleeves along with red shorts and white socks.

== Honours ==
- São Nicolau Island League: 9 listed, 14 total

1983, 1987, 1993/94, 1994/95, 1999/00, 2001/02, 2011/12, 2013/14, 2015/16

- São Nicolau Cup: 2

2007/08, 2012/13

- São Nicolau Super Cup: 3

2008/09, 2013/14, 2015/16

- São Nicolau Opening Tournament: 3

2001/02, 2014/15, 2016/17

== League and cup history ==
=== Performance in CAF competitions ===
- CAF Cup: 1 appearance

1995: disqualified in First Round
(Tunisia) ES Sahel – no matches took place

=== National championship ===
| Season | Div. | Pos. | Pl. | W | D | L | GS | GA | GD | P | Notes | Playoffs |
|---|---|---|---|---|---|---|---|---|---|---|---|---|
| 2000 | 1A | 2 | 3 | 1 | 2 | 0 | 6 | 3 | +3 | 5 | Did not advance | Did not participate |
| 2002 | 1 | 5 | 8 | 5 | 1 | 2 | 15 | 9 | +6 | 16 | | |
| 2012 | 1B | 1 | 5 | 5 | 0 | 0 | 15 | 8 | +7 | 15 | Advanced into playoffs | 2nd place |
| 2014 | 1B | 3 | 5 | 2 | 1 | 2 | 3 | 3 | 0 | 7 | Did not advance | Did not participate |
| 2016 | 1A | 5 | 5 | 1 | 1 | 3 | 5 | 10 | -5 | 4 | Did not advance | Did not participate |

=== Island/Regional Championship ===
| Season | Div. | Pos. | Pl. | W | D | L | GS | GA | GD | P | Cup | Opening | Notes |
|---|---|---|---|---|---|---|---|---|---|---|---|---|---|
| 2001–02 | 2 | 1 | 12 | 10 | 2 | 0 | 36 | 2 | +24 | 32 | | | Promoted into the National Championships |
| 2004–05 | 2 | 6 | 12 | 0 | 0 | 12 | 0 | 36 | -36 | 0 | | | |
| 2011–12 | 2 | 1 | 14 | 9 | 3 | 2 | 30 | 12 | +18 | 30 | | | Promoted into the National Championships |
| 2013–14 | 2 | 1 | 14 | 10 | 2 | 2 | 27 | 8 | +22 | 32 | Winner | | Promoted into the National Championships |
| 2014–15 | 2 | 2 | 14 | 9 | 3 | 2 | 19 | 9 | +10 | 30 | | Winner | |
| 2015–16 | 2 | 1 | 14 | 11 | 3 | 0 | 37 | 12 | +25 | 36 | | | Promoted into the National Championships |
| 2016–17 | 2 | 3 | 14 | 7 | 4 | 3 | 31 | 15 | +16 | 25 | | | |
| 2017–18 | 2 | 5 | 14 | 4 | 3 | 7 | 12 | 15 | +3 | 15 | | | |

== Statistics ==
- Best position: 2nd (national)
- Best position at an opening tournament: 1st
- Best position at a regional Cup competition: 1st
- Appearances in a cup competition: 14 (regional)
- Appearances in a regional Super Cup competition: 5
- Highest number of points in a season:
  - National: 16
  - Regional: 36
- Highest number of goals scored in a season:, National: 15 (regular season), 20 (total)
- Highest number of wins in the national championships: 7 (2004)
- Lowest number of goals scored in a season: 1 (national)
- Lowest number of points in a season: 0 (national)
- Highest number of goals conceded in a season: 10 (in 2016, regular season), 11 (in 2012, total)
- Worst season: 2005 (neither wins nor draws, all 12 losses)

== Managerial history ==
| Name | Nationality | From | To |
|---|---|---|---|
| José Ramos | Cape Verde | | January 2017 |
| Pirico | Cape Verde | since January 2017 | |
