= Estádio Orlando Rodrigues =

Sports stadium in Tarrafal de São Nicolau, Cape Verde a

- Location within Cape Verde
- Location: Av. Assís Cadório (EN1-SN01); Tarrafal de São Nicolau, São Nicolau, Cape Verde
- Coordinates: 16.564°N 24.3538°W
- Operator: São Nicolau Regional Football Association (ARFSN)
- Capacity: 3,000

Construction
- Opened: 1980s (first); 12 October 2010 (second)

Tenants
- AJAT'SN; FC Praia Branca; FC Ultramarina

Estádio Orlando Rodrigues is a multi-use stadium in Tarrafal de São Nicolau on the island of São Nicolau, Cape Verde and are one of two on the island. It is currently used mostly for football matches and is the home stadium of FC Ultramarina and AJAT'SN, clubs from other parts of the municipality plays at the stadium, the only one being FC Praia Branca from the north of the municipality. The stadium holds 3,000 people, and its ground is artificial grass with its size being 106 x 68 metres. The stadium is operated by the São Nicolau Regional Football Association (ARFSN).

== Location ==
Its location is at Avenida Assís Cadório, which is part of the main route linking with Ribeira Brava and the east of the island (EN1-SN01), it is more than 500 meters ESE of the town center and 300 meters inland from the Atlantic.

== History ==
The stadium was completed in the 1980s or the 1990s and had a single seat in the west and was dirt, later it may have natural grass. Around 2009, expansion started and was completed on 12 October 2010, after the municipality split into two and its field became artificial as the grass was dry and in bad shape due to the climate that is not favorable for natural grass. Before, some clubs from the parish and later also the municipality sometimes trained at the field before its matches. A row of seats would also dominate the north side. It was called Estádio do Tarrafal de São Nicolau, locally as Estádio do Tarrafal as it is read over white in black letters at the north side. Until that time, clubs based in the parish of São Francisco do Assís and also later the municipality of Tarrafal de São Nicolau played at Estádio João de Deus (Dideus) northeast in the island capital of Ribeira Brava.

The first national championship competitions took place in 2011. Every national championship matches only featured FC Ultramarina. More of them were played at the stadium in 2013, 2015 and recently in 2017 which was the first where three of its six group stage matches that will take place at the stadium. One of two semifinal legs which was supposed to take place at the stadium as access was shut as the stadium had no keys, Mindelense was unofficially awarded 0-3 which led to Ultramarina to appeal, the award to Mindelense was revoked. Mindelense brought the squad but did not fully appeared, on August 13, Mindelense was disqualified. Later on August 20, the only national championship finals took place, the first of two legs which featured Sporting Praia took place at the stadium.

It was the stadium where Ultramarina was crowned regional champions on April 22, 2017.

== See also ==
- List of football stadiums in Cape Verde
