= Juncalinho =

- Settlement
- Coordinates: 16.613°N 24.132°W
- Country: Cape Verde
- Island: São Nicolau
- Municipality: Ribeira Brava
- Civil parish: Nossa Senhora do Rosário

Population (2010)
  - Total: 433
- ID: 31217

Juncalinho is a town in the eastern part of the island of São Nicolau, Cape Verde. It is situated on the north coast, 17 km east of Ribeira Brava. The local football club is FC Belo Horizonte.

== See also ==
- List of cities and towns in Cape Verde
