= FC Belo Horizonte =

Belo Horizonte
- Full name: Futebol Clube Belo Horizonte
- Ground: Juncalinho on São Nicolau, Cape Verde
- League: São Nicolau Island League
- 2017–18: 1st, Champion

Futebol Clube Belo Horizonte is a football club that plays in the São Nicolau Island League in Cape Verde. It is based in Juncalinho in the eastern part of the island of São Nicolau.

== About the club ==
FC Belo Horizonte's first title was a cup title won in 2006, their second was won in 2009 and brought the club to their only appearance in the Cape Verdean Cup, the club had the region's most up since. A year later, the club won their first opening tournament in 2007 tying with two other teams that share the first place and they also last place. Recently the club won their third and recent cup title in 2015, it was the sole club until 2017 when it became shared with Ultramarina Tarrafal's, Belo Horizonte also shared it with two from Spring 2014 to 2015. Another opening Tournament title was won for the 2015–16 season and totals three, the most of the island After winning the 2015 cup, the club defeated the regional champion Ultramarina Tarrafal and claimed their only super cup title. The team never won any regional championship titles along with the other five including Caleijão which no longer competes today.

In 2016, the club finished third for five straight seasons, in 2014, they had 26 points and had 8 wins, in 2015, they had 22 points, in 2016 they had 25 points and four goals scored, also the club had 30 goals scored for the 2015–16 season which was second behind SC Atlético. Belo Horizonte started 6th and headed to 3rd at the third round, there the club defeated Talho 4–1, they lost a stint for finished third for the sixth time along with all of its chances for a championship title after a loss to AJAT'SN and was fifth, the club defeated Académica da Preguiça and climbed to fourth and was their last win. On March 11, a goal draw with Ribeira Brava was made and thus completely lost their chance of finishing third followed by two losses to Ultramarina and Praia Branca. A draw with Talho was made at round 10 and picked up a position and lost it a week later and a three match losing streak was followed first to AJAT'SN, then Académcia and lastly Atlético. The final match of the season was a goal draw with Ribeira Brava and the club finished seventh, first got it at the second round, it was less successful as they had 11 points, 7 losses and 13 wins. The goal concessions did not change which was 19 again.

In the first two matches of the 2018 regional championships, they defeated the island's top two clubs of SC Atlético and Ultramarina Tarrafal. They are first place, a feat that was repeated for the club in just two seasons, with 6 points and 6 goals scored, the region's most, their point totals are shared with Académica Preguiça. Belo Horizonte may be one of the best club for the upcoming few rounds as they defeated the top clubs of the island, last time they did it were the island's weakest clubs of Talho and Académica Preguiça. Belo Horizonte made a two-goal draw with Talho and has no losses, the club lost a position to Académica da Preguiça and was second with 10 points, five ahead of the powerful Ultramarina Tarrafal. A scoreless draw with Académica Preguiça was made, then four straight wins, one of them a 1–4 victory over Ribeira Brava which was on February 18, there they grabbed the number one position from Ultramarina. Another win came as they defeated Praia Branca. Belo Horizonte remains first and an unattempted championship title slightly. More victories came for Belo Horizonte, 1–0 over Talho then 2–0 over Académica Preguiça at the 12th round. Two more matches to go, having eight points more than second placed Ultramarina, Belo Horizonte became regional champions for the first time, Belo Horizonte will have all four regional honours alongside their opening tournament/association cup and super cup titles. Belo Horizonte will be the newest entrant into the National Championships and play with Group B which will include Santo Antão North's Os Foguetões and Santiago North's Scorpion Vermelho.

Later in the season, Belo Horizonte will have their fourth appearance in the regional super cup, the only as qualifier as the regional champions.

== Stadium ==
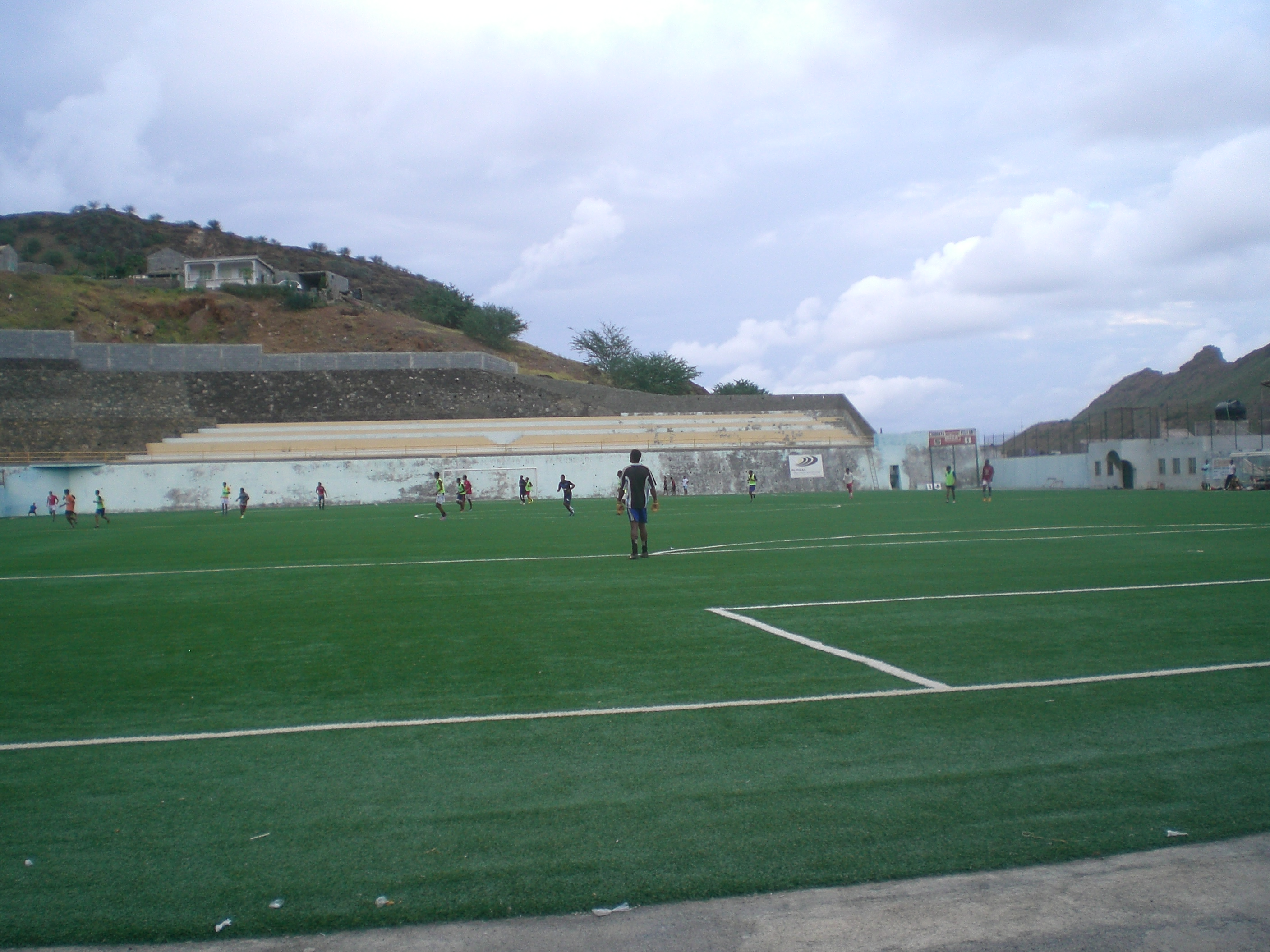
Estádio João de Deus Lopes da Silva, where FC Belo Horizonte plays

The club and plays at Estádio João de Deus Lopes da Silva with a capacity of once served up to 1,000. The club also trains at the stadium. It is the home fields of SC Atlético and Desportivo Ribeira Brava. Other clubs playing at the stadium but not based are Académica da Preguiça and Talho. Caleijão formerly used the field.

== Honours ==
- São Nicolau Island Championships: 1

2017/18

- São Nicolau Opening Tournament: 3

2006/07, 2010/11, 2015/16

- São Nicolau Cup: 3

2005/06, 2008/09, 2014/15

- São Nicolau Super Cup: 1

2014/15

== League and cup history ==
Season	Div.	Pos.	Pl.	W	D	L	GS	GA	GD	P	Cup	Opening	Notes
2010–11	2	4	14	7	2	5	33	18	+15	23			
2011–12	2	3	14	8	2	4	26	16	+10	26			
2013–14	2	3	14	8	2	4	22	11	+11	26			
2014–15	2	3	13	5	7	1	22	10	+12	22	Winner		
2015–16	2	3	14	7	4	3	30	19	+11	25		Winner	
2016–17	2	7	14	2	5	7	13	19	-6	11			
2017–18	2	1	14	11	2	1	30	10	+20	35			Promoted into the National Championships

== Statistics ==
- Best position: 1st (regional)
- Best position at an opening tournament: 1st
- Best position at a cup competition: First Stage (national)
- Best position at a regional Super Cup competition: 1st
- Appearance at the National Championships: Once, in 2018
- Appearances in a cup competition:
  - National: 1
  - Regional: 12
- Appearances in a regional Super Cup competition: 2
- Best season: 2018 (11 wins, 35 points) – regional
- Total wins at a cup competition: 1 (national)
- Total goals scored at a cup competition: 5 (national)
- Total points at a cup competition: 3 (national)
- Total losses at a cup competition: 3 (national)
- Highest number of points in a season: 35 (regional), in 2018
- Highest number of wins in a season: 11 (regional), in 2018
- Total goals conceded at a cup competition: 14 (national)
