= FC Ultramarina =

- Full name: Futebol Clube de Ultramarina
- Founded: August 28, 1965; 61 years ago
- Ground: Estádio Orlando Rodrigues; Tarrafal, São Nicolau; Cape Verde
- Capacity: 5,000
- Chairman: Marineida da Graça
- Manager: Alexandre Ramos
- League: São Nicolau Island League
- 2016–17: 1st, champion
Home colours	Away colours

Futebol Clube de Ultramarina (Portuguese meaning "overseas", Capeverdean Crioulo, ALUPEC or ALUPEK: Futebil Klubi di Ultramarina) is a football (soccer) club that plays in the São Nicolau Island League in Cape Verde. It is based in the city of Tarrafal in the island of São Nicolau. The team has only reached a few of the final games before and after independence.

Ultramarina is São Nicolau's most successful football (soccer) club having won about 24 official regional titles. The team currently has ten championship titles since their recent championship victory was during the 2014/15 season and continues the claim the most titles on the island.

== History ==
The club was founded on August 28, 1965 and is the oldest club on the island, it was named after a company (probably seafood) Sociedade Ultramarina de Conservas which was a benchmark of the city. After independence, the old Ultramarina name was kept as people could not figure a new name after that company became dissolved, years later, some people know that the club name's etymology is different. It is uncertain that the club will adopt a new name.

Their worst season was in 2005 when the club fielded ineligible players in every match especially SC Atlético and finished last place as the goals were awarded against them. It was the worst and one the clubs that fielded the most ineligible players in West Africa and probably that includes a third of the continent.

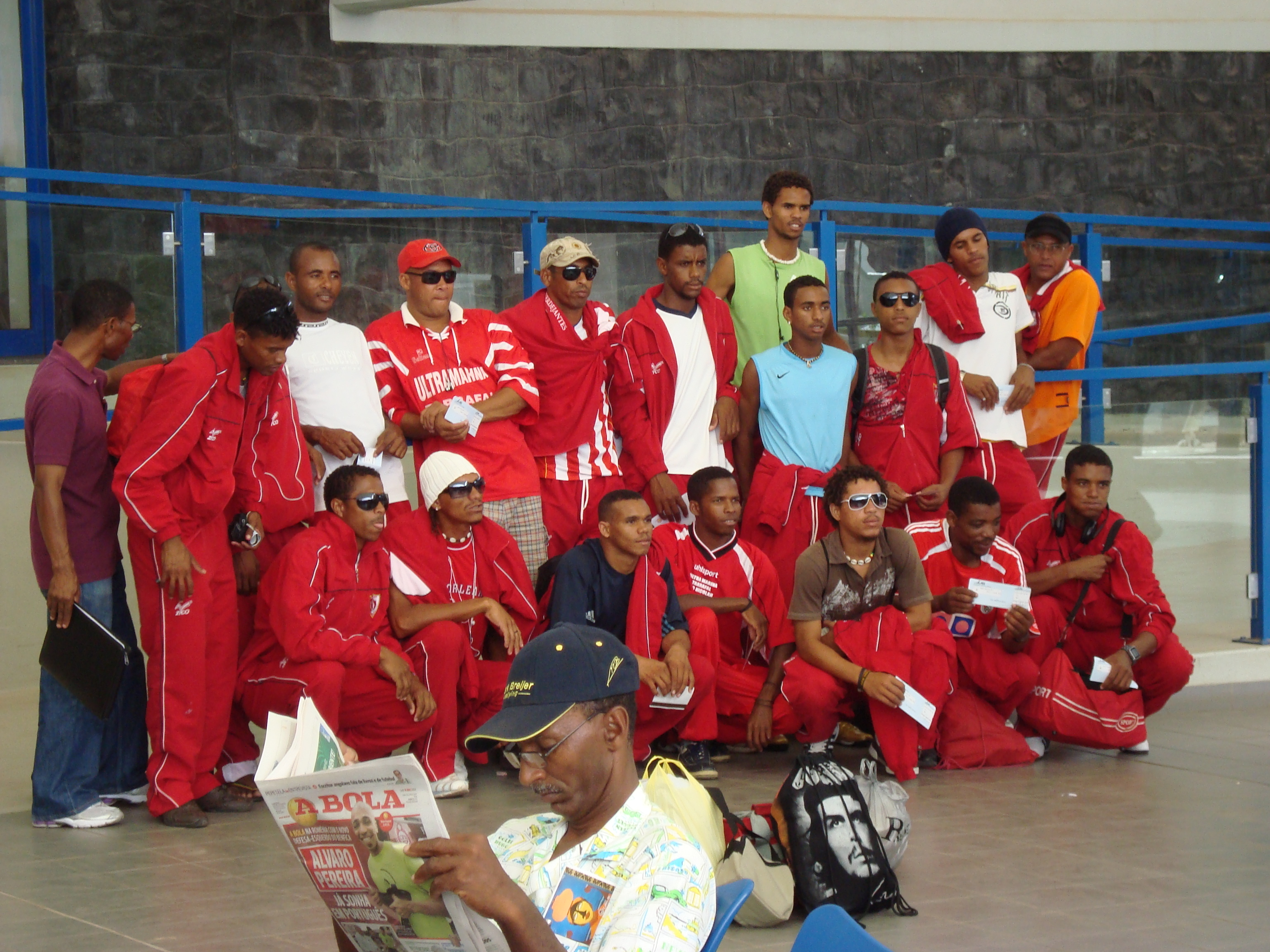
FC Ultramarina's squad of the 2009 season at Praia International Airport

FC Ultramarina went to the 2007 Super Cup played on January 8, 2008, and defeated the cup winner AJAT'SN with 3–1 in penalty kicks as the match was scoreless, Ultramarina received their second title. Since 2008, Ultramarina has the most super cup titles.

On May 7, 2011, Ultramarina played a match against Talho and the original result was 3–1 for Ultramarina, as Ultramarina fielded an ineligible player, the regional association awarded against Ultramarina 0–3 and was deducted 3 points from their 28 points and lowered to 24.

Ultramarina's next three Cup appearances were successful and won three straight titles in 2013. In January 2013, Ultramarina faced the cup winner Atlético in the 2012 regional super cup which featured two legs, the first one (January 5) was scoreless, Ultramarina won the second 2–1 which was on January 12 and claimed their fourth super cup title, their 2013 one was their last, their last two were successful, their last was the 2014/15 Super Cup where they entered as regional champion, the club lost to a cup winner. Before 2013, Ultramarina was the sole club with more than a title on the island.

The club won their first cup title in 2012 and became the fourth and final club on the island to appear at the Cape Verdean Cup and had no success there. Second and last their cup title total, in 2013, that became third and last behind Atlético, it was also shared with AJAT'SN, Ribeira Brava and Talho. The club won their second cup title in 2014 and their cup totals, second on the island was shared with Atlético's and from 2016 for a season with AJAT'SN.

The club was second place behind SC Atlético for the 2013–14 season, the club was champion for the 2014–15 season and was ahead of SC Atlético.

The club celebrated the 50th year of the club's foundation in 2015.

In October 2015, Alexandre Ramos became club coach and Marineida da Graça became the club's first female president. In the 2015–16 season, Ultramarina finished at a lower position of 4th behind SC Atlético, AJAT'SN and Belo Horizonte of Juncalinho, it shared the same numbers (6 wins, 4 draws and losses, conceded 13 goals) with Desportivo Ribeira Brava but Ultramarina Tarrafal scored 21 goals, five more than the fifth placed club. The first three draws and all of its losses were before the 8th round, Ultramarina's last loss at the regional championships was on March 25 where they lost 0–2 to Atlético. Ramos made another successful season, Ultramarina started fourth on January 15, then it was second and got the top position on February 5 and preserved it for the rest of the season and prevented Académica Preguiça from getting the top position. On April 30, they had 33 points, and made the point difference of seven over the second placed SC Atlético, a third back to back regional title was made that day and got their entry into the upcoming 2017 Cape Verdean Football Championships in mid-May. On May 6, the final match of the season was a 0–4 win over Talho and made it the 20th unbeaten match for the club and finished with 36 points, an eight-point difference with Académica da Preguiça who gave back their position and had 11 wins and three draws. In the cup finals, Ultramarina Tarrafal again headed up to the regional cup finals, it took place on May 9, three days after the end of the regional championships for the season, they faced Desportivo Ribeira Brava and defeated it 0–4 and became the island's only club to have a regional double. Tarrafal's totals is shared with Belo Horizonte's, most on the island. Ultramarina played with the cup runner-up Ribeira Brava in the regional super cup on December 23, 2017, it was the club's seventh and recent appearance, Ultramarina defeated Ribeira Brava 8–0 and became the highest result on the island and being one of the highest of any super cup matches in Cape Verde. Ultramarina got their regional triple at the official regional competitions for the season.

Ultramarina attempted another progress in success in their upcoming regional cup on December 30, 2017, where they faced AJAT'SN, it ended in a goal draw, in the penalty shootouts, they won 3–4 and will play with Belo Horizonte of Juncalinho in the upcoming semis. In the regional championships, originally they started with a goal draw with AJAT'SN on January 6, the regional association awarded the club 0–3 as AJAT'SN fielded an ineligible player, the club officially started first place. A week later, the unexpectable was done as they lost to Belo Horizonte 3–2 on January 13, a loss to that club that was very rare in the regionals. Overall, the club had conceded four goals alongside Belo Horizonte at the second round. Ultramarina made a draw without scoring any goals in the island derby featuring Atlético. Ultramarina made an 0–3 win over Ribeira Brava whose club seems to have their worst season today. Ultramarina Tarrafal was third place with only 8 points, Tarrafal has 9 goals scored and got a small chance for another championship title and another entry into the nationals. Ultramarina Tarrafal hailed themselves with three more wins including a larger 0–4 win over Praia Branca and a larger 7–1 win over Talho at home. On February 25, the 8th round, a goal draw with AJAT'SN was made and kept a probable chance of winning another championship title. Another loss Ultramarina Tarrafal suffered and was to first placed Belo Horizonte and half of their chance of another title faded. The island rivalry came and ended in a scoreless draw on March 10. Ultramarina remains to have the most goals scored on the island. Two straight wins were made, Belo Horizonte also made two straight wins, with two more rounds to go and an eight-point difference, Ultramarina completely lost a chance for winning another title. The regional cup competition continued after five months of a huge break, they played with Belo Horizonte on May 17 and made a 1–3 win an advanced to the final played three days later and faced Académica da Preguiça, this season, their success would dominate in the field of cup competition as they claimed another regional cup title once more after their 1–0 win. Ultramarina again will make another appearance in the regional super cup later in the season, in four years, qualified as cup winner, they will meet Belo Horizonte, the champion.

=== National appearances ===
After winning their 1995 regional title, FC Ultramarina was in the national competition and later headed up to the second triangular phase that the knockout stage had, two other participants were Santiago's Travadores and from east of the island Académica do Sal, the club finished second and lost their chance for a national title to Travadores, this was their first of three that was that position. FC Ultramarina were winners of the 2003 season and entered as high as the finals, the team challenged Académico do Aeroporto located southeast in the island of Boa Vista and lost 3–1 in the first leg and won 3–2 in the second leg. It only had three points in total which made the team lost the finals to Académico. It was Ultramarina's first appearance at the playoff level and second from the island to do so.

Ultramarina played in Group A for the 2017 season, with three groups, the other were AJAC da Calheta from Santiago North, Onze Unidos of Maio and Vulcânicos of Fogo. Ultramarina finished first in the group and advanced into the semis and played with the almighty CS Mindelense of the adjacent island São Vicente to the west, Ultramarina Tarrafal prevented entry into the stadium for one match. Ultramarina won the second leg. in mid-July, Ultramarina appealed the reason as they were about to be awarded 3–0 against, later the first leg match were to be played in late July. Mindelense did not show up for a few weeks and after that club failing to appear to play in the first leg, Mindelense was disqualified and its matches were annulled and Ultramarina Tarrafal headed to their second and recent championship final appearance and faced Santiago South's Sporting Praia and lost all the two legs and finished as runner up to that club. Ultramarina Tarrafal was the fourth appearance of a club at the finals from the island and the only one who appeared twice.

== Rivalry ==
Ultramarina's only main rivalry is SC Atlético and is called the São Nicolau derby which started in about the start of the 1990s. One of their recent meetings was in week 1 of the 2015–16 season where they lost to that club.

== Stadium ==
The club plays at Estádio Orlando Rodrigues with a capacity of about 500. The club also trains at the stadium. Other club playing at the stadium is AJAT'SN. Other clubs playing at the stadium but not based is Praia Branca, based north of town.

Until the late-2000s before its own stadium was constructed, the club played at Estádio João de Deus Lopes da Silva which was located 56 km on road (about 15 km direct and 30 km via the port of Preguiça) once played along with São Nicolau's most famous teams.

== Logo ==
Its logo features a red-white crest with two swordfishes (gray and gray-red on each side) with a football (soccer ball) on the bottom and "FCU" on the bottom left and the year of foundation on the right.

== Uniform ==
Home uniform up in 2011
Away uniform in 2011
Home uniform from 2014 to May 2017

Newly put in 2017, its uniform colors has a black clothing, in the T-shirt part, its rims and sleeves are black with the remainder red for home games. The club still has a white T-shirt and socks with a red shirt for away or alternate games. From 2014 to 2017, Is uniform colors for home had a T-shirt half red and white with a white rim on the right sleeve and red on the left with the remainder red but has a white rim on the bottom of its shorts.

== Honours ==
- São Nicolau Island League: 12

1995/96, 1998/99, 2000/01, 2002/03, 2003/04, 2005/06, 2006/07, 2008/09, 2010/11, 2012/13, 2014/15, 2016/17

- São Nicolau Cup: 4

2011/12, 2013/14, 2016/17, 2017/18

- São Nicolau Super Cup: 6

2005/06, 2006/07, 2010/11, 2011/12, 2012/13, 2016/17

- São Nicolau Opening Tournament: 2

2002/03, 2013/14

== League and cup history ==
=== National championship ===
Season	Div.	Pos.	Pl.	W	D	L	GS	GA	GD	P	Notes	Playoffs
1999	1A	4	6	0	2	4	3	10	-7	2	Did not advance	Did not participate
2001	1	6	6	0	1	5	2	8	-6	1		
2003	1A	1	4	3	0	1	9	4	+5	9	Advanced into the playoffs	Finalist
2004	1B	1	4	2	1	1	7	3	+4	7	Advanced into the playoffs	Semi-finalist
2006	1B	3	5	2	1	2	6	9	0	7	Did not advance	Did not participated
2007	1A	4	5	1	2	2	2	8	-3	5	Did not advance	Did not participate
2009	1A	4	5	2	1	2	11	6	+5	7	Did not advance	Did not participated
2011	1A	5	5	1	0	4	6	11	-5	3	Did not advance	Did not participate
2013	1A	4	5	1	1	3	5	12	-7	4	Did not advance	Did not participate
2015	1B	4	5	2	0	3	12	16	-4	6	Did not advance	Did not participate
2017	1A	1	6	4	1	1	11	6	+5	13	Advanced into the playoffs	Finalist

=== Island/Regional Championship ===
Season	Div.	Pos.	Pl.	W	D	L	GS	GA	GD	P	Cup	Opening	Notes
2004–05	2	7	12	0	0	12	0	36	-36	0			
2006–07	2	1	14	9	3	2	18	3	+15	30			Promoted into the National Championships
2008–09	2	1	10	7	3	0	16	8	+8	24			Promoted into the National Championships
2010–11	2	1	14	8	4	2	32	18	+14	25 (-3)			Promoted into the National Championships
2012–13	2	1	13	9	3	1	35	6	+29	30			Promoted into the National Championships
2013–14	2	2	14	8	5	1	32	9	+23	32	Winner	Winner	
2014–15	2	1	14	11	1	1	40	8	+32	34			Promoted into the National Championships
2015–16	2	4	14	6	4	4	21	13	+8	22			
2016–17	2	1	14	11	3	0	33	4	+29	36	Winner	Not held	Promoted into the National Championships
2017–18	2	2	14	9	3	2	37	11	+26	30	Winner		

== Statistics ==
- Best position: Finalist (national), in 2003 and in 2017
- Best position at an Opening Tournament: 1st
- Best position at a regional Super Cup competition: 1st
- Appearances at a cup competition:
  - National: 1
  - Regional: 14
- Appearances at a regional Super Cup competition: 8, to be 9
- Highest number of points in a season: 9 (national)
- Highest number of goals scored in a season: 14 (national with playoffs in 2004), 12 (national in 2015)
- Worst season: 2005 (neither wins nor draws, all 12 losses)

== Players ==
=== Current squad ===
27 August 2017

Note: Flags indicate national team as defined under FIFA eligibility rules; some limited exceptions apply. Players may hold more than one non-FIFA nationality.

No.	Pos.	Nation	Player
—	MF	CPV	Adyr
—	FW	CPV	Djassa
—		CPV	Patchik
—		CPV	Augusto

== Presidents ==
- (Cape Verde) Alexandre Ramos (up to October 2015)
- (Cape Verde) Marineida da Graça (current)
