= Ribeira Brava, Cape Verde =

Ribeira Brava
- Settlement
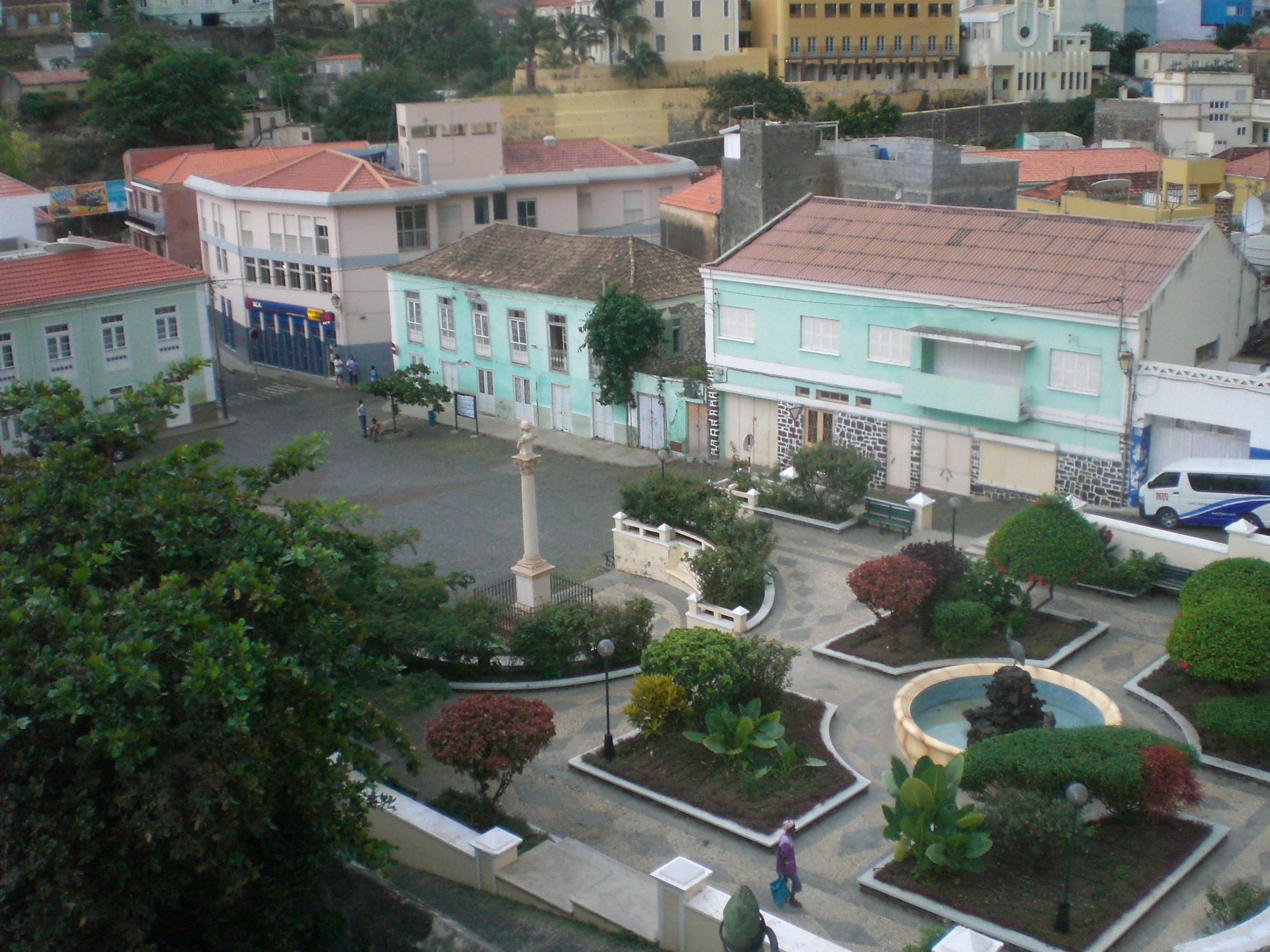
- Town square in Ribeira Brava

- Location within Cape Verde
- Coordinates: 16.615°N 24.299°W
- Country: Cape Verde
- Island: São Nicolau
- Municipality: Ribeira Brava
- Civil parish: Nossa Senhora do Rosário

Population (2010)
  - Total: 1,936
- ID: 31228

Ribeira Brava is a city on the island of São Nicolau, Cape Verde. It is the seat of the Ribeira Brava Municipality. Its population was 1,936 at the 2010 census. The town is situated in the valley of the river Ribeira Brava, east of the main mountain range of the island. The name of the river (and the town) is Portuguese for "rough stream", referring to the violent behaviour of the river during rains. The city has a colonial look with Portuguese style buildings, parks and gardens, small winding streets, and steep hills.

== History ==
Ribeira Brava was founded in 1653, when the older settlement Porto de Lapa, 8 km (5.0 mi) to the east on the south coast, had been abandoned due to pirate attacks. It was the seat of the Roman Catholic Diocese of Santiago de Cabo Verde between 1786 and 1943. The Seminário-Liceu, founded in Ribeira Brava in 1866 and abolished in 1917, was an important center of higher education in the archipelago. From 1931 political prisoners from Portugal were held in the building.

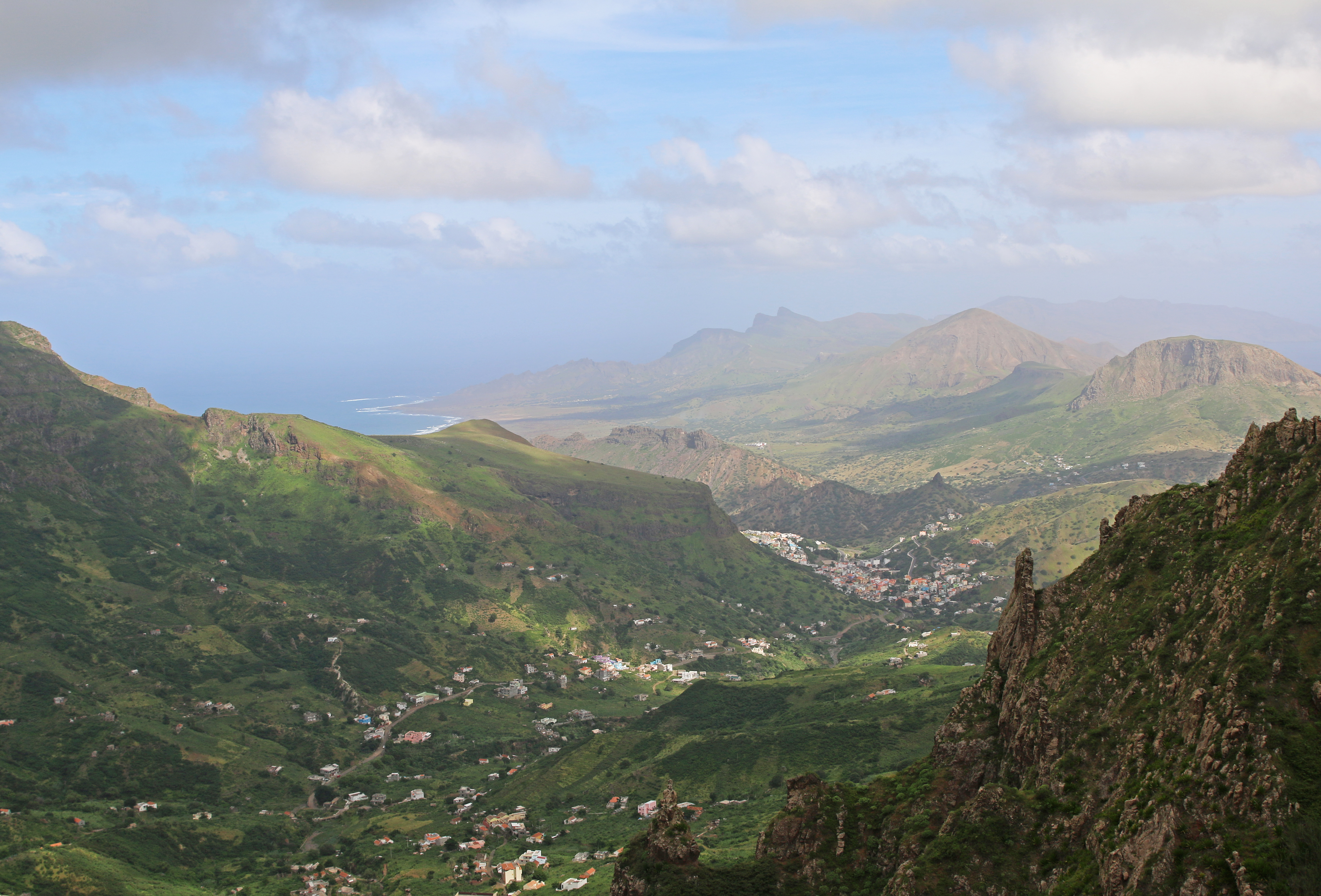
View of the Valley of Ribeira Brava

== Demographics ==
Year	Population
1990	1899
2010	1936

== Transport ==
The Preguiça Airport lies 3 km southeast of Ribeira Brava. The main ferry port is at Tarrafal de São Nicolau.
