= Sports in Santo Antão, Cape Verde =

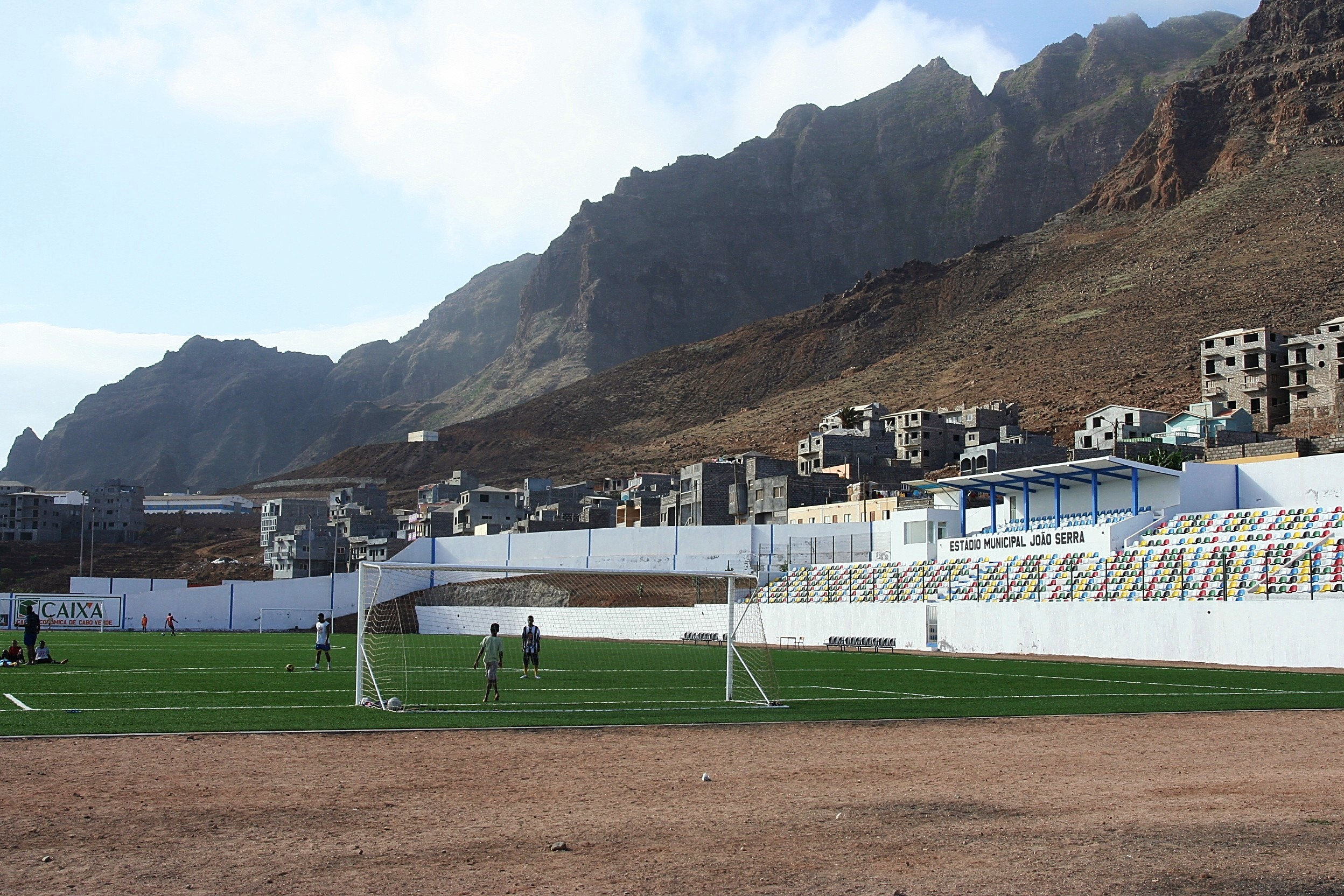
Estádio João Serra, home of Solpontense and the second home of Paulense and Rosariense and serves as headquarters of the North Zone

The island of Santo Antão in Cape Verde in the west of the Barlavento Islands is home to several teams and clubs. The major amateur clubs are Sporting Clube do Porto Novo, Académica Porto Novo and Paulense. Its first football championship was founded in 1996 and from 2002, the association and competition are currently divided into two zones, the north (the championships and the association) and the south (the championship and the association) and includes all sports including football, basketball, volleyball and athletics and may have futsal today. Other than football, it has a single regional association covering the island.

== Football (soccer) ==
Football (soccer) remains to be the most popular sport both in the island and the nation. The island has 20 football (soccer) clubs, of which 9 are in the North Zone (6 in the Premier Division and 5 in the Second Division) and nine in the South Zone.

Unlike other parts of Cape Verde, Santo Antão was the last inhabited island to have its own island championships founded in 1995, before clubs played with other unregistered clubs before its foundation. Difficulties with accessing the north and south parts of the island split into two groups in 1998 and in 2003, the association split.

In 2007, an all-island cup was established with Rosariense was the first winner, the next edition was in 2016 as the north and south parts of the island became partly easily accessible with Estrada Litoral opened in 2009 which runs in the eastern edge of the island and the third was in 2017. The first Santo Antão Super Cup took place in 2015. Also the island has each zone a cup and a super cup competitions, until 2014, it also had an opening tournament competitions.

The original four of each zones (totalled eight then) competed in the regional championships up to 2003. More clubs added and brought a total to seven in 2005 for the North Zone and in 2008, seven in the South Zone and eight in 2009. Three more clubs added which made a total of nine as late as 2011 brought the North Zone to be the only part to have tiers two and three. In 2014, Tarrafal FC de Monte Trigo was founded in the South Zone. Two more were founded recently in the North Zone, Santo Crucífixio was founded in 2015 and participated in the North Zone's Premier Division after being promoted in 2016, Torreense is the youngest club founded in 2016 and is the only club who competed only in the Second Division.

The oldest football and sports club on the island is Sporting Carvoeiros which was founded in 1956, after the town completed its port and became the island's name, the town's name changed along with the club and became Sporting Porto Novo, second is Paulense and third is Académica Porto Novo. The most successful club is Académica do Porto which has been since 2011 and may became the top ten or fifteen clubs in the country and recently won eleven championship titles for the South Zone in 2017.

As of 2016, the Santo Antão North Zone's clubs are Beira Mar, Foguetões, Janela, Paulense, Santo Crucifixo and Sinagoga in the Premier Division and Irmãos Unidos, Rosariense, São Pedro Apostolo, Solpontense and Torreense in the Second Division.

Of the 20 clubs, the largest are concentrated in the Porto Novo numbering nine, of which five are based in the town that is also an island capital, seven are based in the municipality of Ribeira Grande and four in the municipality of Paul.

Overall, Porto Novo has the most titles numbering 17, second is Paul with nine and third is Ribeira Grande with ten.

The island also features some municipal football (soccer) tournaments, in Paul and Ribeira Grande which have their own Municipal Tournament.

== Basketball ==
Basketball is the second most popular sport on the island. They have a single championship which started around the start of the 21st century and does not have that many clubs.

== Volleyball ==
Volleyball is another sport in Cape Verde, the most popular club is Académica do Porto Novo. Beach volley on the island has recently gained popularity.

== Other sports ==
Futsal and athletics are other sports on the island. Athletics are competed at the Estádio Municipal do Porto Novo and is the only athletic complex on the island.

== Sporting events ==
Numerous National Championship finals took place several times at Estádio Municipal do Porto Novo for some times, its recent was in 2016.

== Stadium and arenas ==
Stadium	Town / City	Capacity	Type	Tenants	Region
Estádio Municipal do Porto Novo	Porto Novo	8,000	Football	Académica do Porto Novo, Sporting Porto Novo, Fiorentina Porto Novo and Inter Porto Novo and the remaining clubs of the South Zone	Santo Antão South Zone (football); Santo Antão (athletics)
Estádio João Serra	Ponta do Sol	2,000	Football	Solpontense and the remaining clubs of the North Zone	Santo Antão North Zone

=== Smaller sports complexes ===
Stadium	Town / City	Type	Tenants
Cirio	Cirio	Football	Sanjoanense, Santo André^{1}
Coculi	Coculi	Football	Santo Crucífixo^{1}
Coqueiral	Pombas	Football	Paulense^{1}
Lajedos	Lajedos	Football	Lajedos FC^{1}
Monte Trigo	Monte Trigo	Football	Tarrafal FC de Monte Trigo^{2}
Tarrafal sobre Ribeiras Grande e Torre	Ribeira Grande	Football	Beira-Mar^{1} and Rosariense^{1}
Tarrafal de Monte Trigo	Tarrafal de Monte Trigo	Football	Tarrafal FC de Monte Trigo^{1}

^{1}Home field, but only used for training
^{2}Only used as a training ground

== See also ==
- Sport in Cape Verde

Sport in other islands

- Sports in Sal, Cape Verde
- Sports in Santiago, Cape Verde
- Sports in São Vicente, Cape Verde
