= Santo Antão South Regional Football Association =

- Founded: 1997
- Locations: Porto Novo; Estádio Municipal do Porto Novo (1,000)
- Affiliations: Santo Antão Football Association; Cape Verdean Football Federation
- Website: Official website

Santo Antão South Regional Football Association (Portuguese: Associação Regional de Futebol de Santo Antão Sul, abbreviation: ARFSSA, not commonly as Associação Regional de Futebol de Zona Sul de Santo Antão, abbreviation: ARFZSSA) is a football (soccer) association covering the south and the west of the island of Santo Antão . It is headquartered in the city of Porto Novo. The association covers the entire municipality of Porto Novo. The association are one of six in Cape Verde that covers only one municipality. It is the sublevel of both the Santo Antão Football Association, reestablished in 2015 and the Capeverdean Football Federation.

The championship only has a single division where nine clubs participate, a club with the most points promotes into the regional premier division the following season Uncertain that the regional championship will have two divisions as a possible club addition could occur. It is likely that a single level competition is going to be kept for the following season.

== History ==
The association was unilaterally founded in 1997. Santo Antão was the first island league to feature a second division league, it was once known as the second level. It was founded in 2002 after the Santo Antão Island League was split into two. The south zone would have its seat in Porto Novo, the island capital.

Since 2015, the association are the remaining four associations which contains only a single level football competition.

== Organization ==
The association also organizes and functions the regional championships, the Cup, the Super Cup and the Opening Tournament, commonly as the Association Cup (equivalent to the two-tier cup in other countries which includes the League Cup). The association has nine registered clubs, the regional champion competes in the National Championships each season.

- Santo Antão South Regional Championships

== Registered clubs ==
The region's registered clubs as of late 2015 include.

Club	Location	Founded	Registered
Académica do Porto Novo	Porto Novo	1981	late-1980s
Fiorentina Porto Novo	Porto Novo	1995	2007
Inter Porto Novo	Porto Novo		2007
Lajedos FC	Lajedos		2007
Marítimo Porto Novo	Porto Novo	1981	late-1980s
Sanjoanense	Ribeira das Pratas	1984	early-1990s
Santo André	Norte, Alto Mira		2008
Sporting Porto Novo	Porto Novo	1956	mid-1980s
Tarrafal FC de Monte Trigo	Tarrafal de Monte Trigo	2008	2013
