= Porto Novo Super Cup =

- Founded: 2007
- Region: Municipality of Porto Novo, Santo Antão, Cape Verde
- Current champions: Associação Académica do Porto Novo (6th time)
- Most championships: Associação Académica do Porto Novo (6 times)

The Porto Novo Super Cup, known as the Filipe de Bitú Super Cup (Portuguese: Super-Taça de Filipe de Bitú) is a regional football (soccer) super cup competition played during the season in the southern and westernmost parts of Santo Antão Island, Cape Verde. The super cup is organized by the Santo Antão South Regional Football Association (Associação Regional de Futebol de Zona Sul do Santo Antão, ARFZSSA). The regional champion competes with a regional cup winner. When a club wins both the regional championship and cup for the season, the club competes with a cup finalist. The first edition was held in 2007. Since the 2015 edition, the winner qualifies into the Santo Antão Super Cup, a single island competition. Académica do Porto Novo won this year's edition and will qualify to compete (as champion as they also won the cup) into the single insular super cup and face the cup winner of the north zone Paulense.

Académica Porto Novo won the most titles numbering six, their last one was in 2017. The remaining are Sporting, Fiorentina and Inter Porto Novo are the other clubs that each has a super cup won.

For the upcoming 2018 season, one participant became listed, the champion Académica Porto Novo

== Winners ==
Season	Winner	Score	Runner-up
2006/07	Associação Académica do Porto Novo		Sporting Porto Novo
2007/08	GDRC Fiorentina		Marítimo
2008/09	not held		
2009/10	Inter Porto Novo^{1}		Marítimo
2010-11	not held (Note: The 2011 Super Cup was not held due to that Sanjoanense, runner-up in the regional cup wifhdrew for the following season due to financial problems)		
2011/12	Associação Académica do Porto Novo	8-1	Sporting Porto Novo^{1}
2012/13	not held (Note: The 2013 Super Cup was not held due to that Fiorentina Porto Novo, runner-up in the regional cup withdrew for the following season due to financial problems)		
2013/14	Associação Académica do Porto Novo		Marítimo^{1}
2014/15	Associação Académica do Porto Novo		Marítimo^{1}
2015-16	Associação Académica do Porto Novo		Lajedos^{1}
2016-17	Associação Académica do Porto Novo	4-0	Os Sanjoanenses (Ribeira das Pratas)^{1}

^{1} Second place cup winner

== Performance By Club ==
Club	Winners	Winning years
Associação Académica do Porto Novo	6	2007, 2012, 2014, 2015, 2016, 2017
Marítimo	1	2008
Inter Porto Novo	1	2010

== See also ==
- Santo Antão Cup and Super Cup
- Santo Antão Island League (South)
- Porto Novo Cup
