= Estádio Municipal do Porto Novo =

Sports stadium in Porto Novo, Cape Verde

- Location within Cape Verde
- Location: off Porto Novo-Norte Road; Porto Novo, Santo Antão, Cape Verde
- Coordinates: 17.0213°N 25.0768°W
- Owner: Municipality of Porto Novo
- Operator: Santo Antão South Football Association (ARFSSA); Santo Antão Regional Athletics Association (ARASA)
- Capacity: 3,500

Construction
- Groundbreaking: 2002
- Opened: 2009

Tenants
- Académica; Fiorentina; Marítimo; Sanjoanense; Sporting

Estádio Municipal do Porto Novo is a multi-purpose stadium in Porto Novo, Cape Verde just about a l=kilometer west of the city center on the road connecting Porto Novo and places west of the island including Norte and Tarrafal de Monte Trigo. It is currently used mostly for football matches along with athletics. The stadium is owned by the municipality of Porto Novo and are operated by the Santo Antão South Regional Football Association (ARFSSA) and the Santo Antão Regional Athletics Association (ARASA). The stadium holds about 3,500 people and has seat rows in the left sides. The stadium is home to the Santo Antão Island League South Zone's clubs including Académica, Fiorentina, Marítimo, Sanjoanense and Sporting. Its size is 105 by 68 m. It is the westernmost sports stadium in the whole of Africa, it is also the westernmost athletic facility. It has one of the westernmost football fields in the whole of Africa.

== History ==
The stadium was opened in 2009, the older stadium was 300 m from the city center and was called Estádio Amílcar Cabral, named after the revolutionary of Cape Verde, it lay next to Porto Novo Beach, it was located south of the main road and the seats were rowed in the north. The field was the island's first and was opened around the mid to late 1950s.

Construction of the newer stadium started in 2002 in the westernmost part of the town (community) limits, the field was completed in around 2007 along with its track and field, its seats in around 2008 and the remainder in 2009. As the grass of the field was deteriorating, in September 2014, an artificial turf was added

The stadium was twice used for the national championships, the first was the first of two matches with Mindelense in 2013 where Mindelense won 3–0 over Acadèmica on July 7, later Mindelense won the 9th title, the second was the last of the two matches played on July 11, 2016 where both Mindelense and Acadèmica scored once, so the match went into penalty kicks and Mindelense defeated Académica with four goal to three and claimed their record breaking twelfth title, Mindelense also won their fourth consecutive title.

== Athletics at the stadium ==
The only athletic association of the island is the Santo Antão Regional Athletics Association has its offices at the stadium. The regional athletics championships takes place every season.

== See also ==
- List of football stadiums in Cape Verde
- Sports in Santo Antão, Cape Verde
