= Porto Novo Opening Tournament =

Santo Antão South/Porto Novo Opening Tournament
- Founded: 1999
- Region: Porto Novo Municipality in Santo Antão, Cape Verde
- Teams: 9
- Current champions: Académica do Porto Novo
- Most championships: Académica do Porto Novo

The Santo Antão South Opening Tournament (Portuguese: Torneio de Abertura de Santo Antão Sul, Capeverdean Crioulo, ALUPEC or ALUPEK: Turnéu di Abertura di Santo Anton Sul) or the Porto Novo Opening Tournament (Portuguese: Torneio de Abertura do Porto Novo, Capeverdean Creole, ALUPEK: Turnéu di Abertura du Purtu Nobu) is an opening tournament. (equivalent to a league cup) played during the season in the southern part of Santo Antão Island consisting of the municipality of Porto Novo, Cape Verde. The opening tournament is organized by the Santo Antão South Regional Football Association (ARFSSA).

== History ==
The first competition was held in 1999. In the early years, there were four clubs, in 2008, it risen to six and in 2009, it became seven. In 2015, its club total is nine equaling to that of the regional championships.

Some people thought that the opening tournament tended its competitions in 2015 as the Santo Antão Cup was revived in late 2015 and earlier in 2014, the creation of the Paul and Ribeira Grande local tournaments lead to the elimination of the opening tournament. Also that year, its opening tournament competitions was thought to be eliminated in the island's South Zone. It was not held due to scheduling concerns partly with the single island cup competitions. The next edition started in November 2017.

== Winners ==
Season	Winner	Runner-up
1999-2000	Académica do Porto Novo	
2000-01	Académica do Porto Novo	
2001-02	Unknown	
2002-03	Unknown	
2003-04	Académica do Porto Novo	
2004-05	Sporting Porto Novo	
2005-06	Sporting Porto Novo	
2006-07	Académica do Porto Novo	
2007-08	Sporting Porto Novo	
2008-09	Sporting Porto Novo	CF Sanjoanense
2009-10	Unknown	
2010-11	Académica do Porto Novo	
2011-12	Académica do Porto Novo	
2012-13	Académica do Porto Novo	
2013-14	Not held	
2014-15	Académica do Porto Novo	
2015-16	Not held	
2016-17	Not held	
2017	Académica do Porto Novo	Fiorentina do Porto Novo

=== Performance By Club ===
Club	Winners	Winning years
Académica do Porto Novo	9 listed	2000, 2001, 2004, 2007, 2011, 2012, 2013, 2015, 2017
Sporting Porto Novo	4	2005, 2006, 2008, 2009

== See also ==
- Sports in Santo Antão, Cape Verde
- Santo Antão South Premier Division
- Santo Antão South Cup
- Santo Antão South Super Cup
