= Ribeira de Alto Mira =

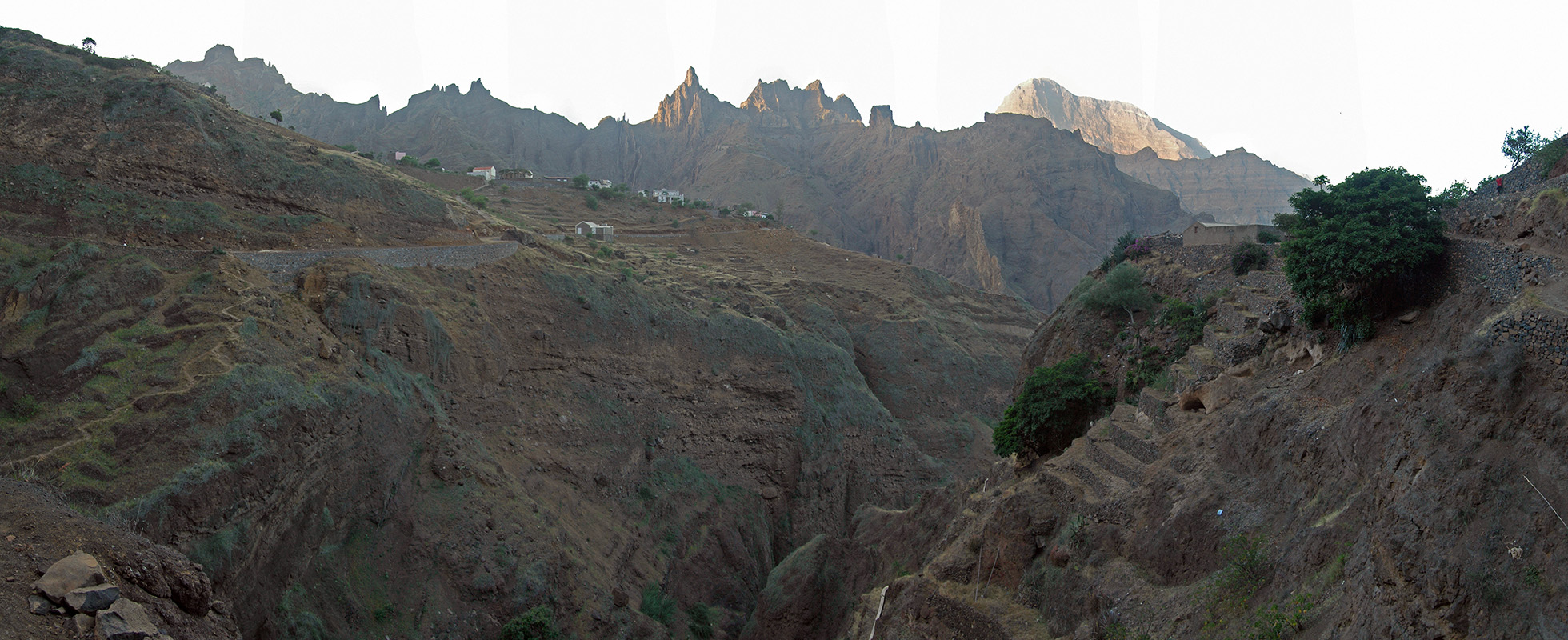

Location
- Country: Cape Verde

Physical characteristics
- Source
  - location: West of Gudo de Cavaleiro, Santo Antão
- Mouth
  - location: Atlantic Ocean
  - coordinates: 17.1279°N 25.2352°W

Ribeira de Alto Mira is a stream in the northwestern part of the island of Santo Antão in Cape Verde. Its source is west of the mountain Gudo de Cavaleiro. It flows towards the northwest, entirely within the parish of Santo André, Porto Novo municipality. It passes the settlements of Alto Mira and Chã de Branquinho before emptying into the Atlantic Ocean.

== See also ==
- List of streams in Cape Verde
