= Gudo de Cavaleiro =

Mountain in Cape Verde

- Location within Cape Verde

Highest point
- Elevation: 1,810 m (5,940 ft)
- Listing: List of mountains in Cape Verde
- Coordinates: 17°04′52″N 25°10′19″W

Geography
- Location: central Santo Antão

Gudo de Cavaleiro is a mountain in the middle of the island Santo Antão in Cape Verde. Its elevation is 1,810 meters. Part of the eastern plateau of Santo Antão, it lies directly south of the Moroços natural park. Nearby places are the villages Alto Mira to the west and Lagoa to the east. The mountain lies on the border of the municipalities Ribeira Grande and Porto Novo.

== See also ==
- List of mountains in Cape Verde
