= Santo André (disambiguation) =

Santo André, São Paulo is a Brazilian municipality.

Santo André (Portuguese and Galician for Saint Andrew) may also refer to:

== Places ==
Brazil:

- Santo André, Paraíba, a city

Cape Verde:

- Santo André (Porto Novo), a civil parish

Portugal:

- Santo André (Santiago do Cacém), a city
- Santo André, Póvoa de Varzim, a neighborhood
- Cape Santo André

Spain:

- Santo André de Teixido, a pilgrimage sanctuary in Cedeira, Galicia

== Other ==
- Esporte Clube Santo André, a Brazilian football (soccer) team
- NRP Santo André, a Portuguese Navy ship 1962–1975, now the museum ship Rickmer Rickmers in Hamburg
- Navio Museu Santo André, a museum ship in Gafanha da Nazaré, Ílhavo, Portugal
