= Alto Mira =

- Settlement
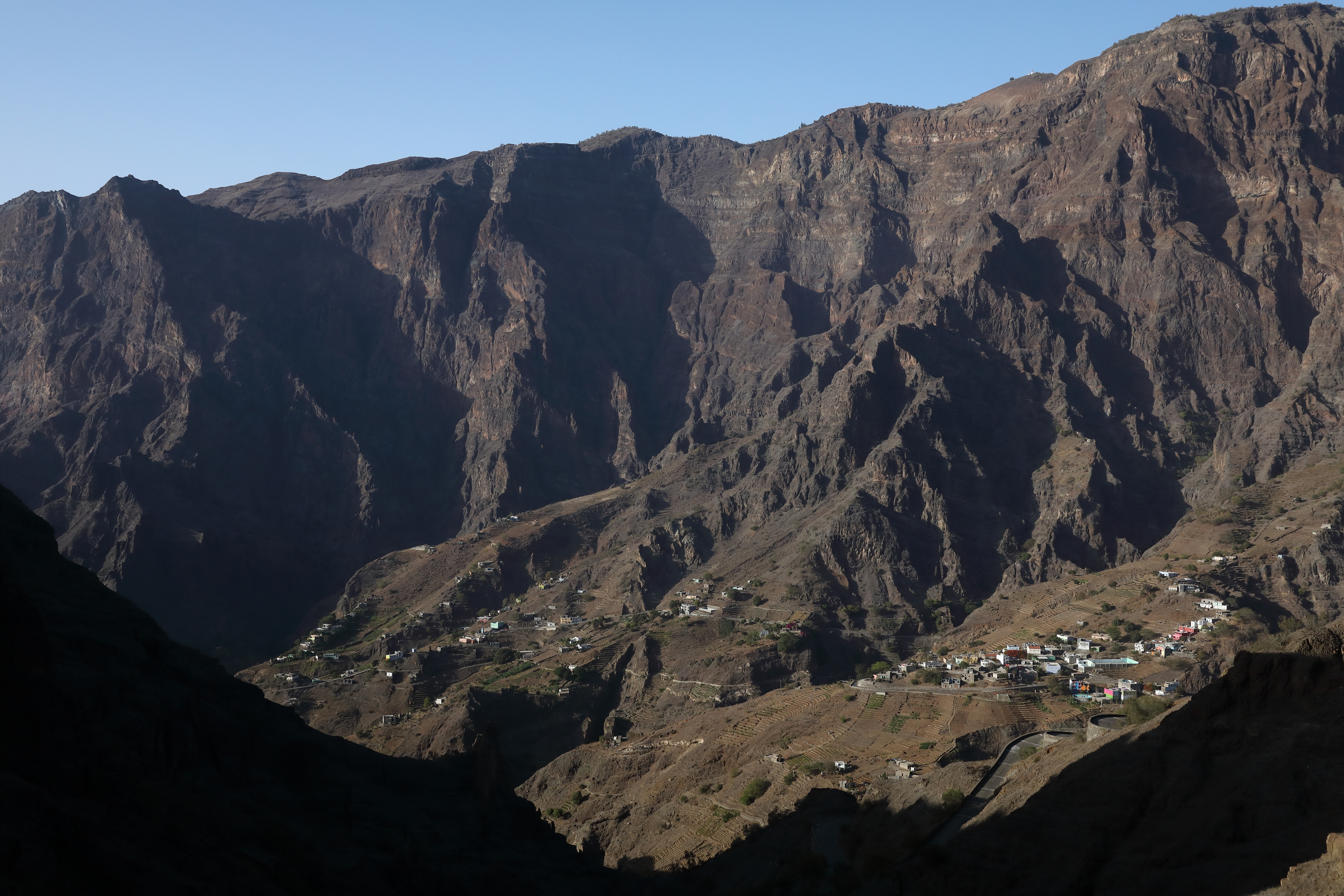

- Location within Cape Verde
- Coordinates: 17.096°N 25.212°W
- Country: Cape Verde
- Island: Santo Antão
- Municipality: Porto Novo
- Civil parish: Santo André

Population (2010)
  - Total: 1,003
- ID: 13201

Alto Mira is a settlement in the northwestern part of the island of Santo Antão, Cape Verde. It is situated 4 km southeast of Ribeira da Cruz and 18 km northwest of the island capital Porto Novo. Its population was 1,003 at the 2010 census. The Moroços Natural Park lies east of the settlement. The settlement is divided into several localities, including Chã Bonita, Chã Daurinca, Chã de Dragoeiro, Dominguinhas, Faial and Lombo Gorado. The Ribeira Alto Mira flows through the settlement.

== See also ==
- List of villages and settlements in Cape Verde
