= Morro Vento =

- Settlement
- Coordinates: 17.108°N 25.079°W
- Country: Cape Verde
- Island: Santo Antão
- Municipality: Porto Novo
- Civil parish: São João Baptista

Population (2010)
  - Total: 107
- ID: 13113

Morro Vento (also: Morro de Vento) is a settlement in the island of Santo Antão, Cape Verde. It is situated in the mountainous interior of the island, 9 km north of the island capital Porto Novo. The settlement is named after the hill Morro do Vento, elevation 1,409 meters.
