= Bolona, Cape Verde =

Bolona
- Settlement
- Coordinates: 17.0147°N 25.2435°W
- Country: Cape Verde
- Island: Santo Antão
- Municipality: Porto Novo
- Civil parish: São João Baptista

Population (2010)
  - Total: 112
- ID: 13199

Bolona is a settlement in the west central part of the island of Santo Antão, Cape Verde. In 2010 its population was 112. It is situated about 19 km west of the island capital Porto Novo. At about 1,500 m elevation, it is one of the highest settlements of the island.

== See also ==
- List of villages and settlements in Cape Verde
