= Lombo de Figueira =

- Settlement
- Coordinates: 17.0991°N 25.0673°W
- Country: Cape Verde
- Island: Santo Antão
- Municipality: Porto Novo
- Civil parish: São João Baptista

Population (2010)
  - Total: 281
- ID: 13110

Lombo de Figueira is a settlement in the eastcentral part of the island of Santo Antão, Cape Verde, part of the municipality of Porto Novo and the parish of São João Baptista. In 2010 its population was 281. It is situated about 9 km north of the island capital Porto Novo, on the national road from Porto Novo to Ribeira Grande (EN1-SA01). Subdivisions include Água das Caldeiras and Chã de Tampa. An endemic species of butterflies, Leptotes pirithous capverti, has been found in the area.

== See also ==
- List of villages and settlements in Cape Verde
