= Lagoa, Porto Novo =

- Settlement
- Coordinates: 17.081°N 25.146°W
- Country: Cape Verde
- Island: Santo Antão
- Municipality: Porto Novo
- Civil parish: São João Baptista

Population (2010)
  - Total: 358
- ID: 13106

Lagoa is a settlement in the central part of the island of Santo Antão, Cape Verde. In 2010 its population was 358. It is situated at about 1,200 m elevation on the eastern plateau of Santo Antão, 11 km northwest of the island capital Porto Novo. The Moroços Natural Park lies about 3 km west of Lagoa.

== See also ==
- List of villages and settlements in Cape Verde
