= Porto Novo Cup =

- Founded: 1997
- Region: Municipality of Porto Novo, Santo Antão, Cape Verde
- Current champions: Associação Académica do Porto Novo (11th time)
- Most championships: Associação Académica do Porto Novo (12 times)

The Porto Novo Cup is a regional football (soccer) cup competition played during the season in the southern and westernmost parts of Santo Antão Island, Cape Verde. The winner participates in the Cape Verdean Cup. The cup tournament is organized by the Santo Antão South Regional Football Association (Associação Regional de Futebol de Zona Sul do Santo Antão, ARFZSSA). The first entrant was in 2007. Since 2013, there were no entrants to the national cup due to financial concerns. From the 2015 edition, the winner qualifies into the Santo Antão Cup, a single island cup competition challenging a club from the north.

Académica Porto Novo won their 11th and recent regional cup title which was also their sixth consecutive

The upcoming super cup edition will feature Académica Porto Novo and Marítimo, Académica will qualify as champions, also being cup winner, Marítimo will qualify as runner up in the cup final

== Winners ==
Season	Winner	Score	Runner-up
1996/97	Associação Académica do Porto Novo		
1997/98	Associação Académica do Porto Novo		
1998/99	Associação Académica do Porto Novo		
1999/2000	Associação Académica do Porto Novo		
2000/01	Marítimo		
2002	unknown		
2002/03	Sanjoanense		
2003/04	Not held		
2004/05	Sporting Clube de Porto Novo		
2005/06	Associação Académica do Porto Novo		
2006-09	unknown		
2009-10	Marítimo		Inter Porto Novo
2010-11	not held		
2011/12	Associação Académica do Porto Novo		
2012/13	Associação Académica do Porto Novo	2–0	Fiorentina Porto Novo
2013/14	Associação Académica do Porto Novo		Sanjoanense
2014/15	Associação Académica do Porto Novo		Marítimo Porto Novo
2015/16	Associação Académica do Porto Novo		Lajedos
2016–17	Académica do Porto Novo		Os Sanjoanenses
2017–18	Académica do Porto Novo	2–1 aet	Marítimo Porto Novo

== Club performance ==
Club	Winners	Winning years
Associação Académica do Porto Novo	12 listed, 13 total	1997, 1998, 1999, 2000, 2006/2007?, 2012, 2013, 2014, 2015, 2016, 2017, 2018
Marítimo	1	2001
Sanjoanense	1	2003
Sporting Clube de Porto Novo	1	2005

== See also ==
- Santo Antão Cup and Super Cup
- Santo Antão Island League (South)
- Porto Novo Super Cup
