= Agostinho Neto Airport =

Agostinho Neto Airport Aeródromo de Agostinho Neto
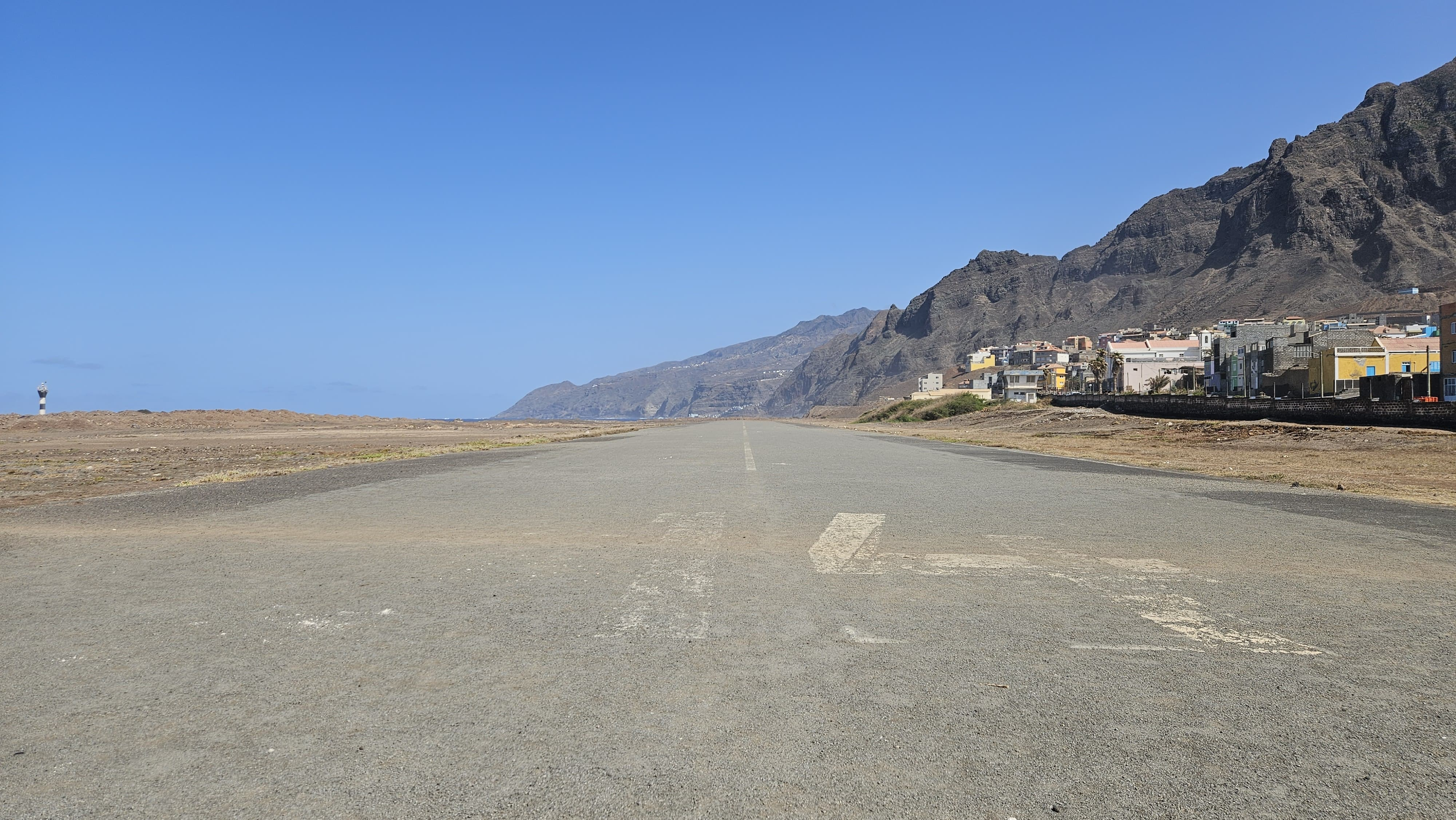
- IATA: NTO; ICAO: GVAN

Summary
- Airport type: Public
- Location: Ponta do Sol, Santo Antão, Cape Verde
- Closed: 1990s
- Elevation AMSL: 32 ft / 10 m
- Coordinates: 17.203058°N 25.090874°W

Map
- Location of Aeródromo Agostinho Neto, São Antão, Cape Verde

Runways
Direction	Length		Surface
Direction	ft	m	Surface
14/32	1,476	450	Asphalt
- Inactive airfield

The Agostinho Neto Airport (Portuguese Aeroporto Agostinho Neto) (IATA: NTO, ICAO: GVAN) was an airport located near the town of Ponta do Sol on the northern tip of the island of Santo Antão, Cape Verde. The airport was named after Agostinho Neto, first president of Angola, who lived on the island during his exile. On 7 August 1999 TACV Flight 5002 from São Pedro Airport (São Vicente) to Agostinho Neto Airport crashed, killing all 18 occupants. For safety reasons, the airport was closed in the 1990s. Since then, Santo Antão does not have an airport. There are plans to build a new airport near Ponte Sul, west of Porto Novo. Construction may start in the 2020s.

== See also ==
- List of airports in Cape Verde
