= Grogue =

Cape Verdean alcoholic beverage

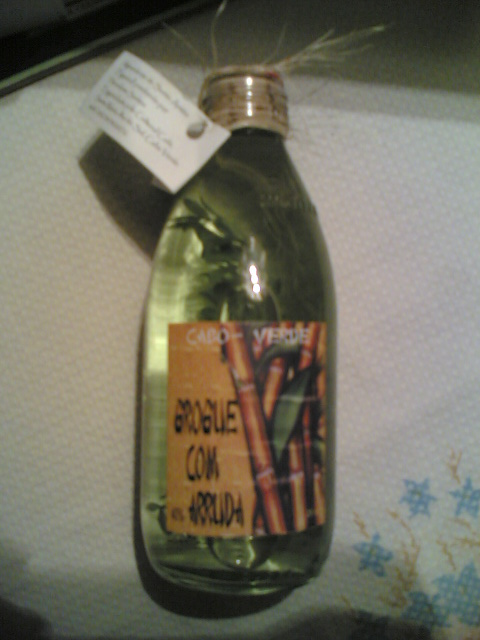
Bottle of grogue with common rue

Grogue, also known as grogu or grogo (derived from English grog), is a Cape Verdean alcoholic beverage, an aguardente made from sugarcane. Its production is fundamentally artisanal, and nearly all the sugarcane is used in the production of grogue. The cane is processed in a press known as a trapiche.

Grogue is the basis for a Cape Verdean cocktail known as ponche (derived from the English word "punch"), which also includes lime and molasses, comparable to the poncha of the island of Madeira.

Grogue and sugarcane production are primarily found in Santo Antão (notably Ribeira do Paul and Ribeira da Cruz) and Santiago.

Grogue is also used as a base for medicinal preparations, with the addition of herbs such as common rue, rosemary, or anise. There is also a grogue preparation made with percebes (goose neck barnacles).

Grogue is made by an old traditional way and because of this there are a lot of different qualities on the market. The government of Cabo Verde is now busy with a European company to introduce grogue on the European markets. This will be a fully controlled grogue of the best quality by the name 'Grogue Official'.

In some tourist locations, caipirinhas are prepared with grogue.

== Gallery ==
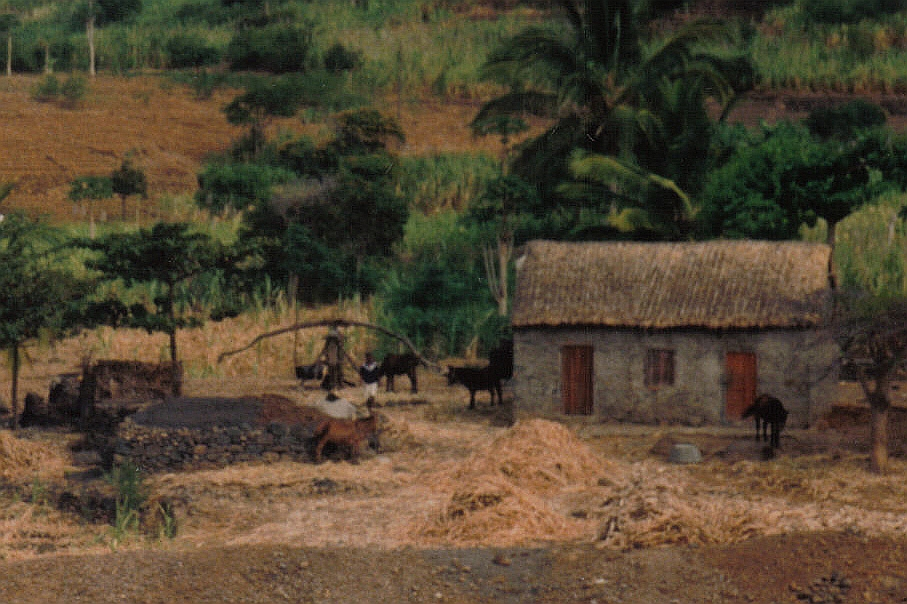
Trapiche in Ribeira da Cruz, Santo Antão, Cape Verde

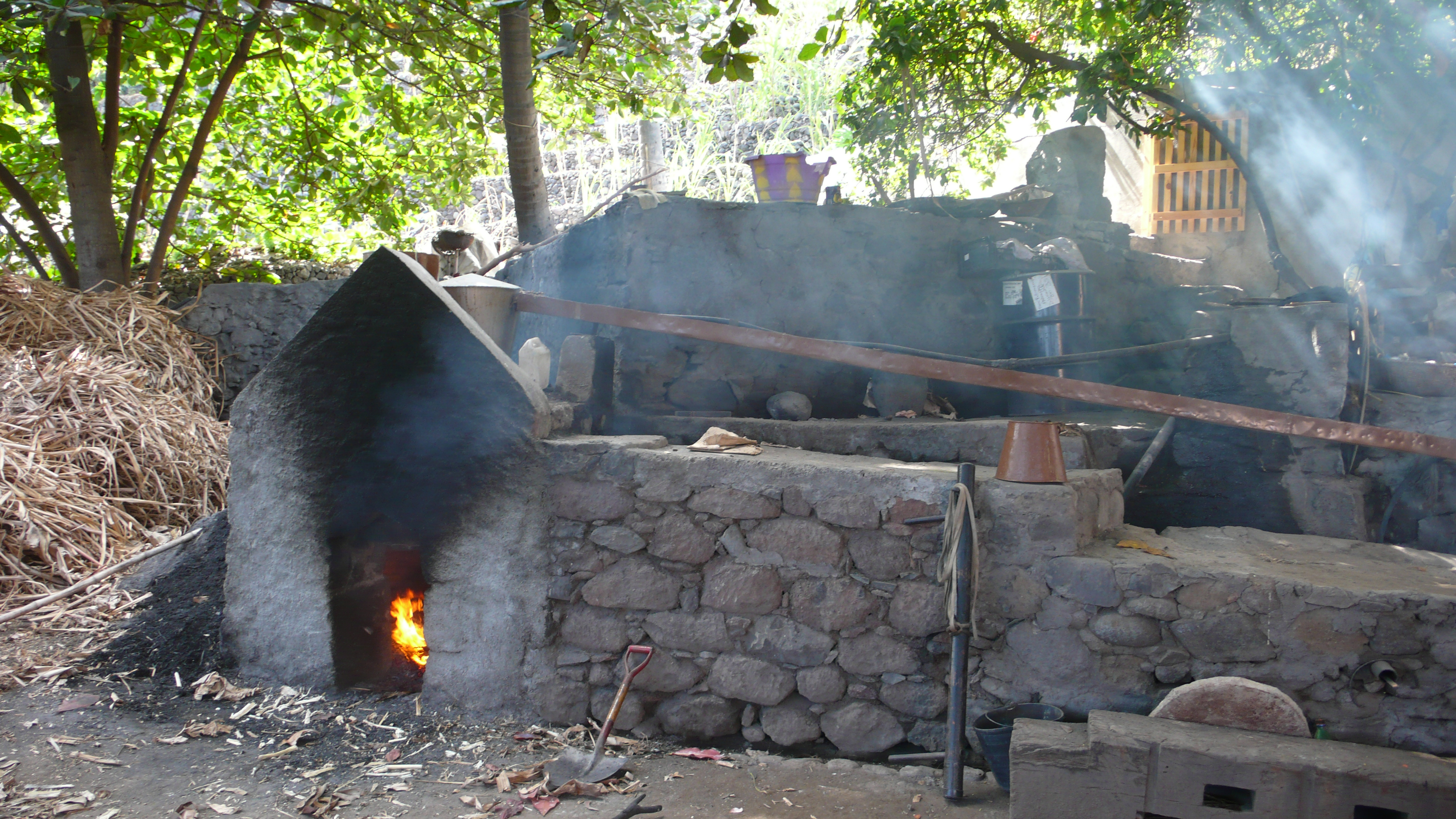
Still used for making on Santo Antão

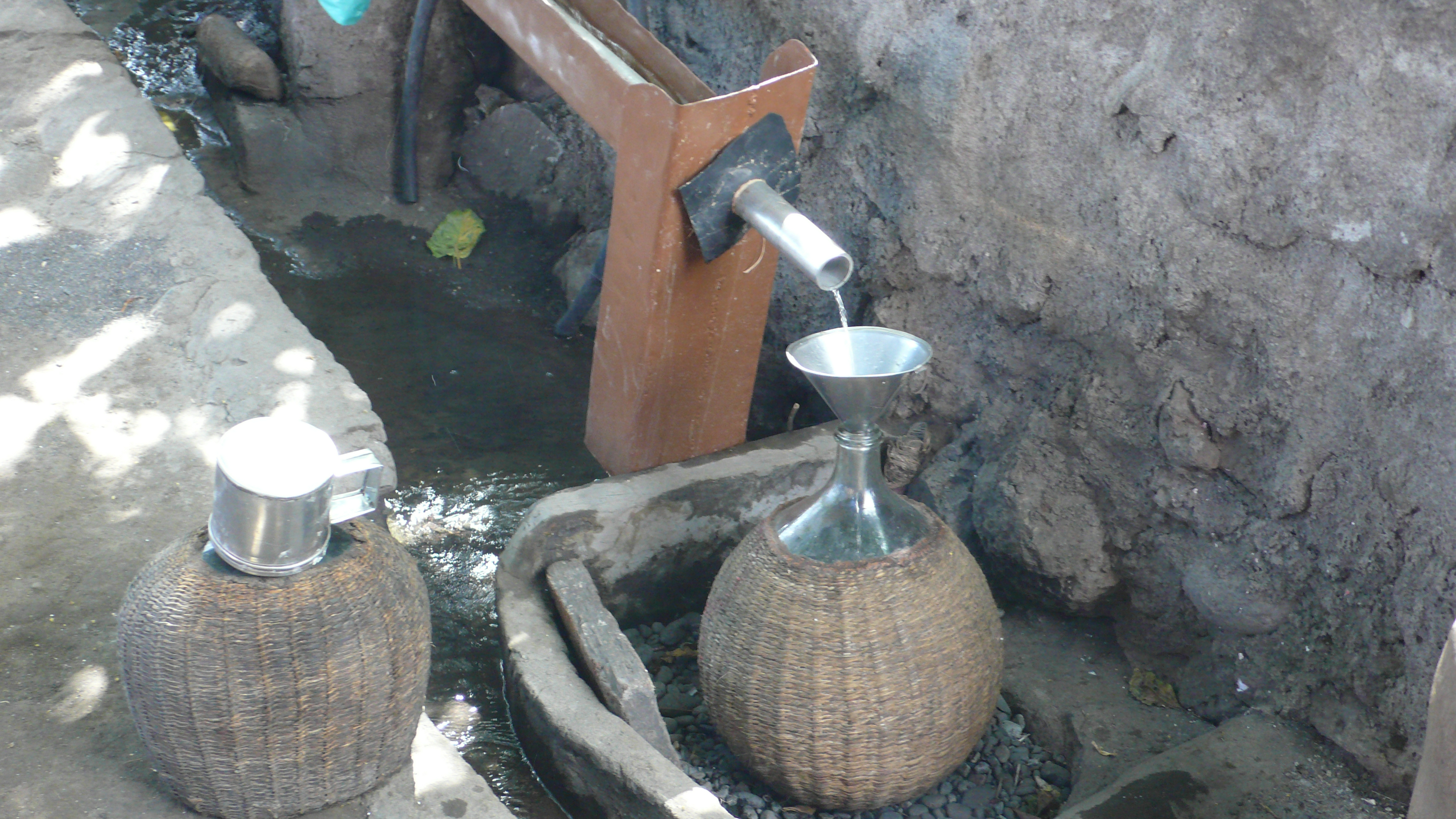
Distilling grogue
