= Xolote =

Cape Verdean footballer

Personal information
- Full name: Amarilson Monteiro
- Date of birth: February 26, 1989 (age 37)
- Place of birth: Santo Antão, Cape Verde
- Position: Forward

Team information
- Current team: Porto Novo
- Number: 11

Senior career*
Years	Team	Apps	(Gls)
2014–	Porto Novo		

International career^{‡}
2018–	Cape Verde	1	(0)
- * Club domestic league appearances and goals as of 7 July 2018 ‡ National team caps and goals as of 7 July 2018

Amarilson Monteiro (born 26 February 1989), better known as Xolote, is a Cape Verdean professional footballer who plays as a forward for the Cape Verdean club Académica do Porto Novo.

== Professional career ==
Xolote was born in Santo Antão, Cape Verde. He is one of the most prolific strikers in the Santo Antão South Island Championships.

== International career ==
Xolote made his debut for the Cape Verde national football team in a 0-0 (4-3) penalty shootout win over Andorra on 3 June 2018.

== Personal life ==
Xolote studies communication sciences at the Universidade Lusófona.
