= Tarrafal de Monte Trigo =

- Settlement
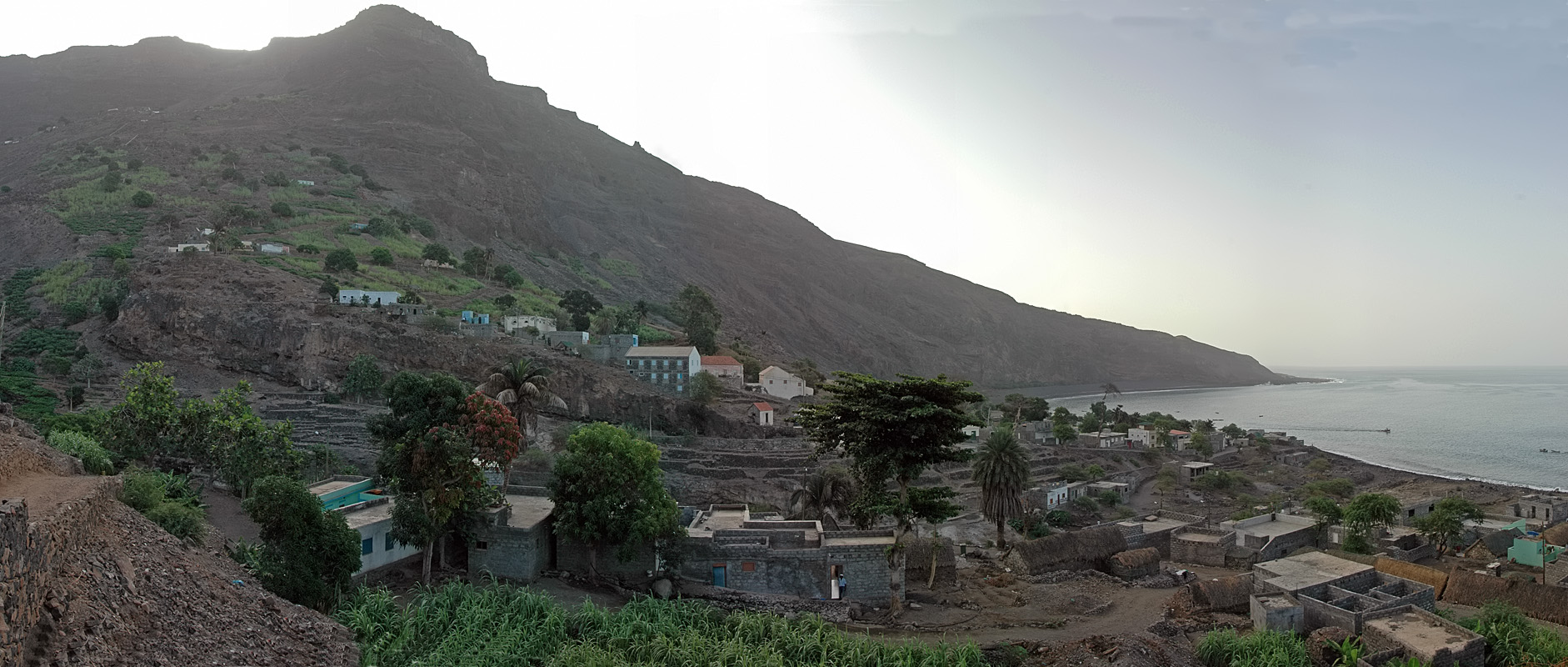

- Location within Cape Verde
- Coordinates: 16.959°N 25.310°W
- Country: Cape Verde
- Island: Santo Antão
- Municipality: Porto Novo
- Civil parish: São João Baptista

Population (2010)
  - Total: 841
- ID: 13121

Tarrafal de Monte Trigo is a settlement in the southwestern part of the island of Santo Antão, Cape Verde. In 2010 its population was 841. It is situated on the coast, 27 km west of the island capital Porto Novo. The settlement was mentioned as Terrafal in the 1747 map by Jacques-Nicolas Bellin.

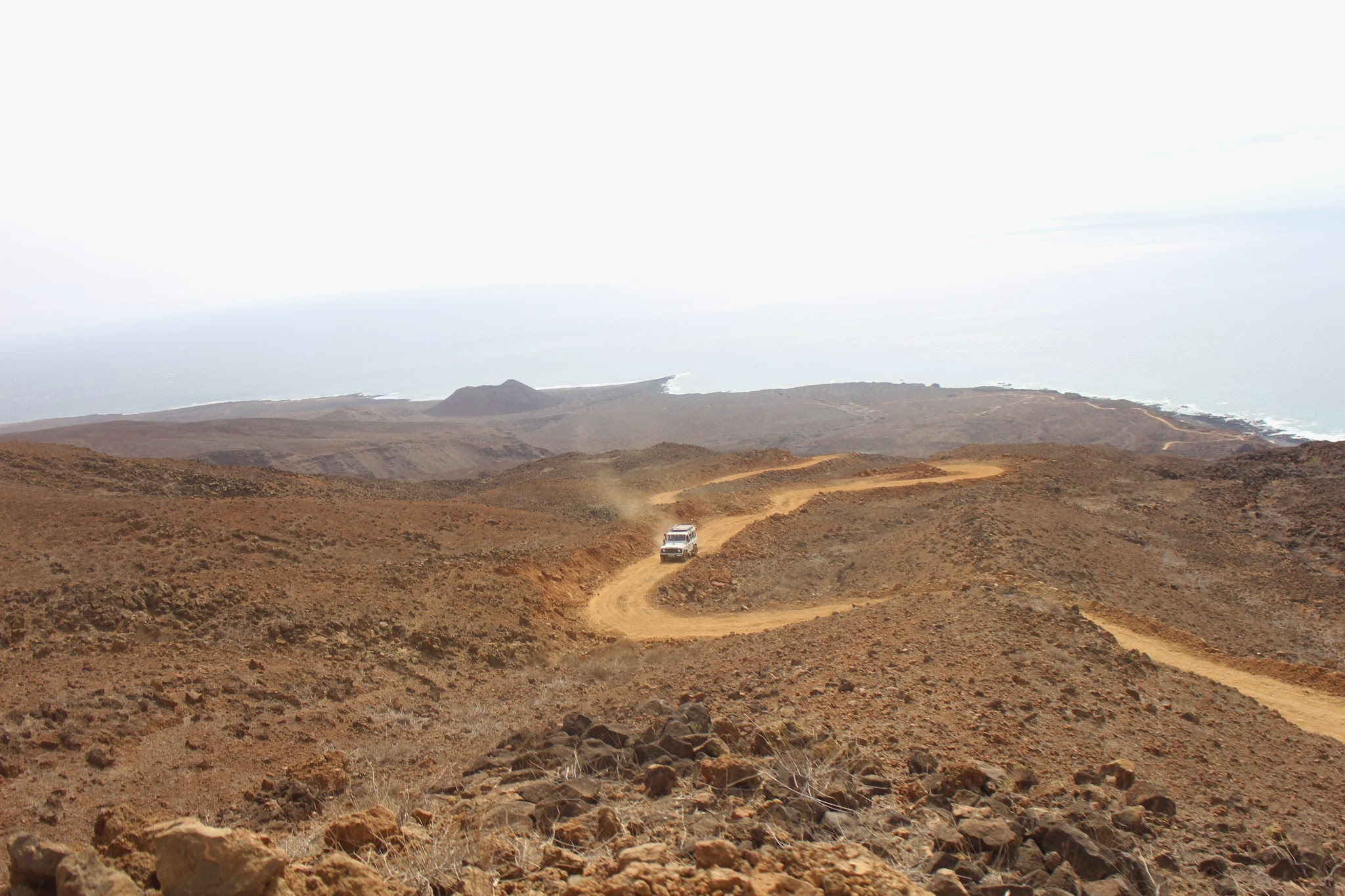
The dirt road connecting Tarrafal with Porto Novo

== History ==
Tarrafal de Monte Trigo is a rather long name considered important to avoid confusing it with other tarrafals in Cape Verde. There are over four of them, one on São Nicolau, and even another one on the island of Santo Antão, which is not really a village, but a section of Ribeira Grande, one of the largest towns on the island. The name Tarrafal comes from the shrub/tree Tamarix senegalensis or Tamarisk, called Tarrafe in Cape Verde.

In February 2021, work on the road to the village was declared finished with an inauguration ceremony.

== See also ==
- List of villages and settlements in Cape Verde
