= TACV Flight 5002 =

Cape Verde flight that crashed in 1999

TACV Flight 5002/Cape Verde Coast Guard
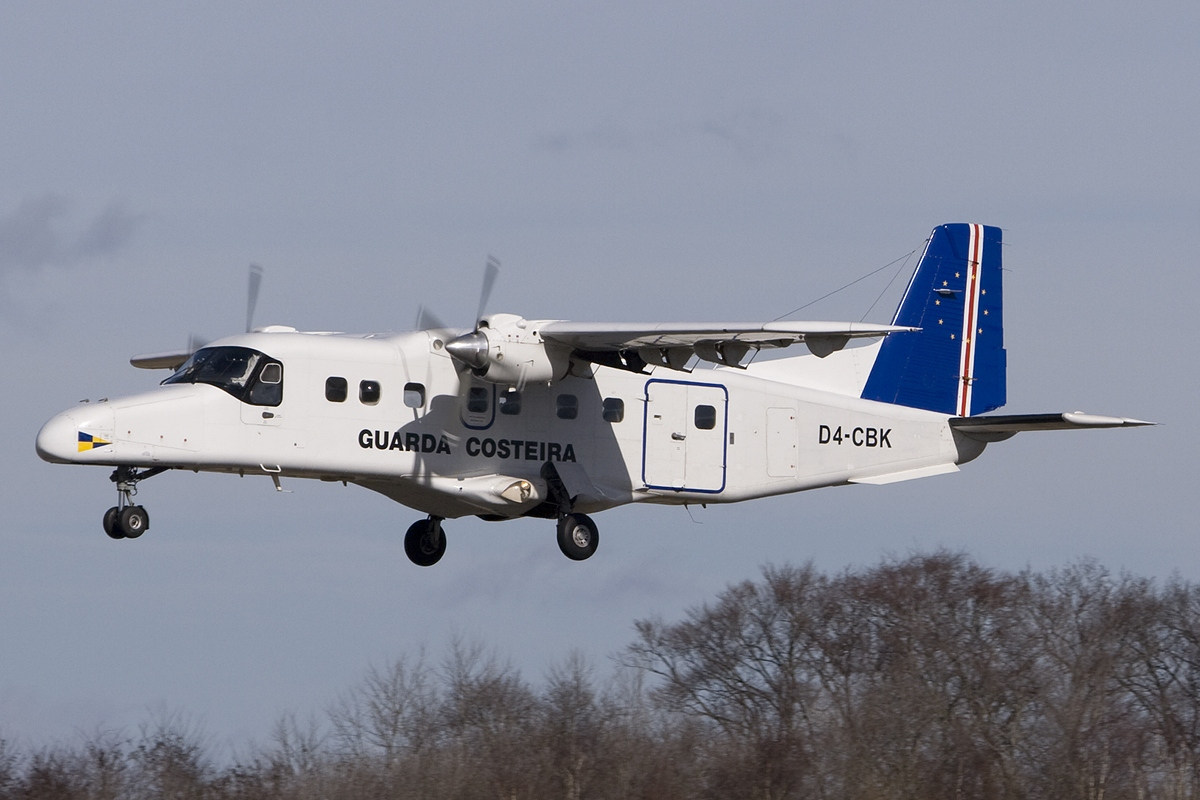
- A Dornier 228 similar to the aircraft involved

Accident
- Date: 7 August 1999
- Summary: Controlled flight into terrain aggravated by inclement weather
- Site: Santo Antão Island, Cape Verde

Aircraft
- Aircraft type: Dornier 228
- Operator: TACV
- Registration: D4-CBC
- Flight origin: Cesária Évora Airport
- Destination: Agostinho Neto Airport
- Passengers: 16
- Crew: 2
- Fatalities: 18
- Injuries: 0
- Survivors: 0

TACV Flight 5002 was a flight operated by TACV that crashed on 7 August 1999. Due to technical difficulties, the aircraft normally serving the route from São Pedro Airport on the island of São Vicente, Cape Verde to Agostinho Neto Airport on the island of Santo Antão, a de Havilland Canada DHC-6 Twin Otter, was replaced with a Cape Verde Coast Guard Dornier 228 (registration D4-CBC).

The aircraft took off from São Pedro at 11:42 for the short flight to Agostinho Neto. Thirteen minutes after takeoff, rain and fog covered Santo Antão and placed the arrival airport below VFR minimums. The pilots made the decision to return to São Vicente at 11:56. The aircraft overflew the island of Santo Antão at 12:02, and crashed into the wooded mountainside at an altitude of 1,370 metres (4,490 ft). The aircraft burst into flames, killing all 18 passengers and crew on board. The crash remains the deadliest aviation accident to occur in Cape Verde.
