= Lajedo, Cape Verde =

Lajedo
- Settlement
- Coordinates: 17.018°N 25.166°W
- Country: Cape Verde
- Island: Santo Antão
- Municipality: Porto Novo
- Civil parish: São João Baptista

Population (2010)
  - Total: 558
- ID: 13108

Lajedo (also Lajedos or Lagedos) is a settlement in the southcentral part of the island of Santo Antão, Cape Verde. In 2010 its population was 558. It is situated in the valley of Ribeira das Patas, about 11 km west of the island capital Porto Novo. The settlement consists of several localities, including Ponte Sul, Lajedo proper and Vascona. The road from Porto Novo to Ribeira da Cruz in the north of the island passes through Lajedo.

== See also ==
- List of villages and settlements in Cape Verde
