= CS Marítimo do Porto Novo =

Football club in Cape Verde

Maritimo Maritimu Maritimo
- Full name: Clube Sportivo Marítimo do Porto Novo
- Founded: 25 September 1981
- Ground: Estádio Municipal do Porto Novo; Porto Novo, Cape Verde
- Chairman: António Maurício
- League: Santo Antão Island League (South)
- 2015–16: 2nd
Home colours	Away colours

Clube Sportivo or Club Sportivo Marítimo do Porto Novo (Capeverdean Crioulo, ALUPEC or ALUPEK: Marítimu, Santo Antão Crioulo: Marítimo, São Vicente Crioulo: Marítim' meaning the maritime) is a football club that had played in the Premier division and plays in the Santo Antão Island League South Zone in Cape Verde. It is based in the town of Porto Novo in the northern part of the island of Santo Antão.

== History ==
The club was founded on 25 September 1981 and is an affiliate to C.S. Marítimo of the Madeira Islands. It is the only Cape Verdean club affiliated to a Madeiran club. The team is now the only team in the division that won only one title since the breakup of the island division in 1997. Their first for the South Zone was in 1999, later, the club came to the island championships and lost the title to Solpontense, Between 2006 and 2007, it had one title each with Sporting. Recently the club could not afford to compete in the island division due to financial concerns in 2012, the club returned for the next four seasons. In the 2016 season, Marítimo shared the number of wins, draws and goals with their rival Académica Porto Novo but was second in number of goals with 34, the club also had 33 points which was a club record in the regionals, the club finished second for the third time and would be their last. Their further successes was totally shattered as the club withdrew for the 2016/17 seasons due to financial concerns, together with Tarrafal de Monte Trigo, the newest club who competed for their third season in the 2016 season. Tarrafal Monte Trigo not to continue to play in the regionals for the following season, but Marìtimo returned for the following season in the regionals.

The club made three straight wins before two losses were made. At the sixth round, a goal draw with Sporting was made. Another loss to Académica occurred, then a goal draw with Inter on 23 February. The final two matches ended in victories and finished third with 14 points, the club scored 17 goals, shared with Fiorentina Porto Novo, second in the region, less than a third less than Académica's 51. In the regional cup, the club played at Group B for three rounds, they qualified into the semis on 24 March and defeated Sporting 3–2 and will be present in the regional cup final. With Académica being champions, Marítimo achieved entry into the upcoming regional super cup.

=== Other competitions ===
Marítimo won their first regional cup title in 2001 and their recent won in 2010, the latter who made their only national cup participation. They came back to the cup finals in 2015 and 2018, each failing to win a title to Académica Porto Novo and finished as a finalist, the latter lost 2–1 in extra time.

As second placed cup winner, the club lost to Académica Porto Novo in the South Zone's super cup, the club also appeared in their only appearance of the Santo Antão Super Cup and lost in the first phase.

== Logo and uniform ==
Its logo has an old fashioned ship's steering wheel and has a lion in the middle colored yellow. On top is the club name's acronym CSM on top. The logo is no longer used for Marítimo in Madeira today as it is different today. Its uniform are also similarly different to that club.

== Honours ==
- Santo Antão Island League (South): 2

1998/99, 2009/10

- Porto Novo Cup: 3

2000/01, 2008/09, 2009/10

== League and cup history ==
=== National championship ===
Season	Div.	Pos.	Pl.	W	D	L	GS	GA	GD	P	Notes	Playoffs
2010	1B	4	5	2	1	2	7	9	-1	7	Did not advance	Did not participate

=== Island/Regional Championship ===
Season	Div.	Pos.	Pl.	W	D	L	GS	GA	GD	P	Cup	Tour	Notes
2009–10	2	1	-	-	-	-	-	-	-	-	Winner		Promoted into the National Championships
2013–14	2	2	12	7	3	2	27	11	+16	24			
2014–15	2	2	12	10	0	2	23	8	+16	30	Finalist		
2015–16	2	2	12	11	0	1	34	4	+30	33	Semi-finalist	Non-participant	
2017–18	2	3	10	4	2	4	17	20	-3	14	Finalist		

== Statistics ==
- Best position: 4th – group stage (national)
- Best position at a cup competition: 1st (regional)
- Appearances at the championships:
  - National: 2
  - Regional: 20
- Appearances at the Santo Antão Cup: Once, in the 2015–16 season
- Appearances at the Santo Antão Super Cup: 2
- Total wins: 2 (national)
- Total goals: 7 (national)
- Total points: 7 (national)
- Highest number of points in a season: 33 (regional only)
