= São João Baptista (Santo Antão) =

- Civil parish
- Coordinates: 17.02°N 25.18°W
- Country: Cape Verde
- Island: Santo Antão
- Municipality: Porto Novo

Population (2010)
  - Total: 14,465
- ID: 131

São João Baptista is a freguesia (civil parish) of Cape Verde. It covers the larger, southern part of the municipality of Porto Novo, on the island of Santo Antão.

== Subdivisions ==
The freguesia consists of the following settlements (population at the 2010 census):

- Agua dos Velhos (pop: 60)
- Bolona (pop: 112)
- Casa do Meio (pop: 36)
- Catano (pop: 266)
- Chã de Morte (pop: 746)
- Cirio (pop: 476)
- Curral das Vacas (pop: 335)
- João Bento/Ribeira dos Bodes (pop: 162)
- Lagoa (pop: 358)
- Lagoa de Catano (pop: 257)
- Lajedo (pop: 558)
- Lombo das Lanças (pop: 40)
- Lombo de Figueira (pop: 281)
- Manuel Lopes (pop: 43)
- Mato Estreito (pop: 58)
- Morro Vento (pop: 107)
- Pedra de Jorge (pop: 55)
- Pico da Cruz (pop: 101)
- Porto Novo (pop: 9,310, city)
- Ribeira Fria (pop: 198)
- Ribeira Torta (pop: 11)
- Ribeirão Fundo (pop: 45)
- Tabuga (pop: 9)
- Tarrafal de Monte Trigo (pop: 841)
