= Santo Antão North Regional Football Association =

Football association in Cape Verde

Santo Antão North Regional Association
- Founded: 1997
- Locations: Ponta do Sol; Estádio João Serra (2,000)
- Affiliations: Santo Antão Football Association; Cape Verdean Football Federation
- Website: Official website

Santo Antão North Regional Football Association (Portuguese: Associação Regional de Futebol de Santo Antão Norte, abbreviation: ARFNSA, not commonly as Associação Regional de Futebol de Zona Norte do Santo Antão, abbreviation: ARFZNSA) is a football (soccer) association covering the north of the island of Santo Antão. It is headquartered in the city of Ponta do Sol. The association covers the municipalities of Ribeira Grande and Paul. It is the sublevel of both the Santo Antão Football Association, reestablished in 2015 and the Capeverdean Football Federation.

The league is several that have a premier and a second division, six clubs participate in the premier and five clubs participate in the second division, a club with the most points promotes into the regional premier division the following season while the last placed club from the regional premier division relegates into the second division the following season.

== History ==
The association was unilaterally founded in 1997. Santo Antão was the first island league to feature a second division league, it was once known as the second level. It was founded in 2002 after the Santo Antão Island League was split into two. The north zone would have its seat in Ponta do Sol.

The Second Division was formed in 2013 and consisted of only three clubs and three stages, the three stage system was abolished in 2015 and became two stage when it has risen to four clubs with Santo Crucifixo competing for the first time and featured six matches, in the 2016/17 season. It is the only part of the island having the second and third tier competitions.

Until 2015, all clubs played in both divisions, until 2016, Santo Crucífixo was the only club who participated in the Second Division. Since November 2016, Torreense is the only club which only participates in the Second Division.

== Organization ==
The association also organizes and functions the regional championships, the Cup, the Super Cup and the Opening Tournament. The association has 11 registered clubs. The regional champion competes in the National Championships each season, once did in the cup (2007) competition who competed at the national level. The regional championships have two divisions.

- Santo Antão North Premier Division (6 clubs)
- Santo Antão North Second Division (5 clubs)

== Registered clubs ==
The region's registered clubs as of late 2016 include.

Club	Location	Founded	Registered
Beira Mar	Ribeira Grande		2003
Foguetões	Eito		2003
Irmãos Unidos	Paul		2011
Janela	Janela		2011
Paulense	Paul	1981	1995
Rosariense	Ribeira Grande and Nossa Senhora do Rosário parish		1995
UD Santo Crucifixo	Coculi and Santo Crucífixo parish		2015
São Pedro Apóstolo	Vale de Garça and São Pedro Apóstolo parish		2011
Sinagoga	Sinagoga		2005
Solpontense	Ponta do Sol	1990	1995
Torreense	Xoxo and the Ribeira da Torre area		2016
