= Santo André, Paraíba =

Santo André
- Municipality
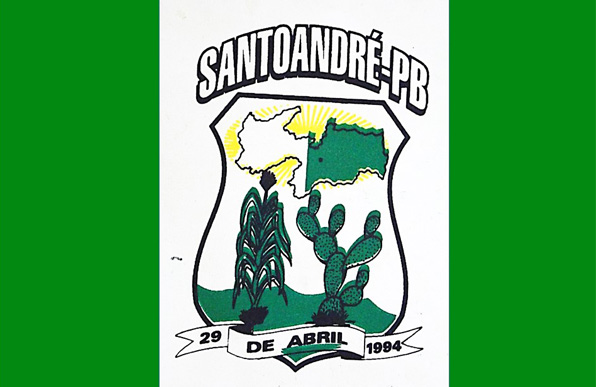
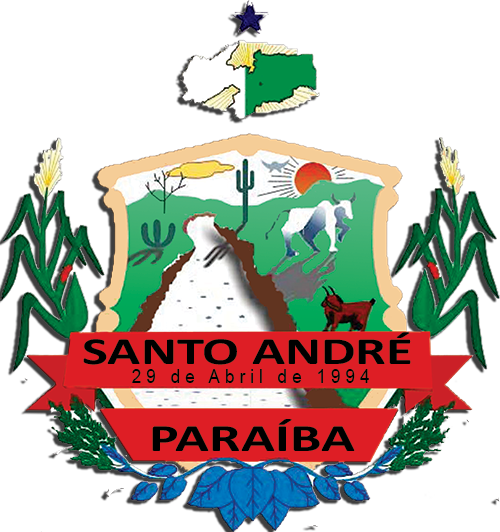
- Flag Coat of arms

- Location in Brazil
- Coordinates: 7°13′4″S 36°37′58″W
- Country: Brazil
- Region: Northeast
- State: Paraíba
- Mesoregion: Boborema

Population (2020)
  - Total: 2,509
- Time zone: UTC−3 (BRT)

Santo André (Central northeastern portuguese pronunciation: [ˈsɐ̃tŭ ɐ̃ˈdɾɛ]) is a municipality in the state of Paraíba in the Northeast Region of Brazil.

== See also ==
- List of municipalities in Paraíba
