= Académica do Porto Novo =

- Full name: Associação Académica do Porto Novo
- Nickname: Mica
- Founded: 14 February 1981
- Ground: Estádio Municipal do Porto Novo, Porto Novo, Cape Verde
- Capacity: 5,000
- Chairman: Osvaldinho Silva Lopes
- Manager: Gunga
- League: Santo Antão Island League (South)
- 2016–17: 1st
- Website: http://www.micapn.com
Home colours	Away colours

Associação Académica do Porto Novo (Capeverdean Crioulo, ALUPEC or ALUPEK: Asosiason Académica du Portu Nobu, Santo Antão Crioulo: Associaçôm Akadémica d' Port' Novo, São Vicente Crioulo: Associação Akadémika d' Port' Novo) is a multi-sport club that plays in the Santo Antão Island League South Zone in Cape Verde. It is based in the town of Porto Novo in the southeastern part of the island of Santo Antão. Sporting activities includes football and volleyball. Its current head is Osvaldinho Silva Lopes and its coach is Gunga. The nickname of the club like many other Académicas is Mica.

Académica do Porto Novo is the most successful football (soccer) club on the island, having won about 33 official regional titles.

== History ==
The club was founded on February 14, 1981, and is an affiliate of the Portuguese club Académica de Coimbra.

=== Regional championship history ===
Their first title was claimed in 1997 and the only title they would win for the island. Later, the team won the most titles since the island division in 1997. Their next title was in 1998 and first after the breakup. After winning the 2000 title, the club did not participate in the national championships, in fact no team participated from the southern zone in 2000. Académica celebrated its 25th anniversary of foundation in 2006. In 2011, success started to rise and finished with 23 points. Four clubs withdrew for the 2012 season and had only four clubs play, the club had six wins, no draws and losses and finished with 18 points, a low number. The 2013 season was Académica Porto Novo's successful career and best season where the club had 36 points and not a single draw or loss, their second was the 2014 season where the club had 34 points and not a single loss, their third was in 2015 and fourth in 2013. Académica's next loss in a few seasons was at the final week losing to their second rival Marítimo 2–1 on April 23, their only success was in goal scoring which scored 60 and was the club record. Overall in any of the island leagues, Académica had about four years without a loss numbering 53 matches, though in a championship with a club less than São Vicente's and no second division, the record is mostly tied with CS Mindelense's, the record is four matches ahead of Brava's Sporting. Also, on week 13, Académica defeated Sporting with a high margin of 11–0. From 2012 to April 2016, Académica's away matches came without any loss numbering 30, ahead of Santiago South's Sporting Praia which had 23 matches without any loss away from home. On April 30, 2017, one part its recently extended 22 match seasons, and third is Mindelense. Also, it holds the record of being without a loss that is a combined South Zone championship-cup-super cup matches numbering about 60 and the winning run lasted until April 23 but not on home matches. It does not include the single Santo Antão Island Cup which the club lost one match and getting knocked out of the competition. In the 2015–16 season, the club had ten titles, One of the few clubs of each island leagues ever to win six consecutive titles; the others being CS Mindelense of nearby São Vicente several times between the foundation up to 1994, Botafogo of Fogo in 1981 and Brava's Nô Pintcha in 1996.

Académica started off the 2016/17 season on November 13 with another win of a high margin 7–0. As of the fifth round, Académica had the lead, ahead of Lajedos, the wins, a draw, and 13 points were shared with that club, the club had 19 goals scored, 9 more than Lajedos, at the 10th round, it was a little narrow and then, put to a 50% difference at the 13th round. The club had the lead for almost the rest of the season. On home matches, it maintained a 35-match unbeaten streak at the regionals, a feat which it continued for six years. The club had 50 goals scored, 13 goals fewer than the previous season but the region's highest. The club was to challenge the eighth-placed Santo André, however, club did not play due partially to finances. Académica Porto Novo was awarded 0–3 and with 31 points, five-point higher than Lajedos. As a result, the club got their seventh consecutive title, On March 26, the club played their last season's match and defeated Lajedos 0–1 and put that club as runner-up, it was another season that the club finished with 34 points but scored 51 goals, more than they had in 2014 but less than in 2016 which made it second for the club. In overall champ titles, it surpassed clubs who had eleven titles including Brava's No Pintcha and Maio's Onze Unidos. For now, it is sixth overall, more than any clubs who has the second most of each region except for Fogo as well as Sporting Praia's totals. Also, other clubs who won 7+ consecutive titles of any island leagues were Mindelense (1975–82), Botafogo (1976–83) and No Pintcha (1994–2001) with eight. Later in May, Onze Unidos' totals may become equaled with the club and São Nicolau's Ultramarina Tarrafal did not equal with their title won.

Académica started the shortened 2017–18 season with three clubs including Tarrafal withdrawn. Their record streak continued but not as planned. Their first match was over Inter 4–1, then Sporing 5–0, Fiorentina Porto Novo. Their results were getting bigger, they defeated Os Sanjoanenses 5–0 on January 20, then an unexpected 8–2 win over Marítimo was made, then 7–0 win over Sanjoanenses at round 6 which should have been a 9th round match as the season were again out of order. Académica defeated Marítimo 4–0 and they in first place up to the ninth round with 21 points. Académica defeated Fiorentina 5–0 and making them the regional champions with 24 points, 10 more over Sporting. The club scored a total of 40 goals which is not likely to be a record. In overall championship titles, are now 13 (possibly 15 or 16 with their wins in the 1980s and before 1995) and surpassed Maio's Onze Unidos with 12 titles. Also, other clubs who won 8+ consecutive titles were Mindelense (1975–82), Botafogo (1976–83) and Nô Pintcha Brava (1992–1999) with eight, except for Nô Pintcha, Académica now ties it, the fourth and last to do so. Académica made a 9–0 win over Inter and had the highest scoring match of the season for the region and not enough to reach a record total of 60. Académica made a victory with fewer goals, 2–0 over Sporting as their season's final match failing another goal record for the club. Académica finished the season with 30 points and a consecutive season with 51 goals.

=== Other regional successes ===
Académica currently has the greatest number of opening tournament titles in the municipality of Porto Novo; three consecutive (1998 to 2000) and two consecutive (2012 to 2013). Porto Novo won their seventh consecutive cup title in 2018 with their recent with the score 2–1 in extra time over Marítimo. In the two recent cup matches of the South Zone, Académica defeated Lajedos in 2016 and in 2017, the club defeated Sanjoanense. Before they won their recent cup title, in the semis on March 8, Académica Porto Novo qualified on an occasion that they were awarded 3–0 by the regional association as the team Santo André who failed to head above the 7th position in the championships in recent years did not show up.

Académica do Porto Novo kept another achievement going as they participated in their next Opening Tournament competition in three years, the club finished first with 13 points and 7 goals and won their recent title.

The club also recently won three consecutive super cup titles after entering as championship winners which made it their triple title successes for the club in 2016. Their recent was in 2016 as they defeated Lajedos FC. Super Cup 2017 will feature the runner-up in the cup Sanjoanense.

Académica qualified to the first ever Santo Antão Super Cup on December 12, 2015, where the club won all two matches and claimed the first ever Super Cup title. In the 2016 South Zone Super Cup, Académica as champion and cup winner defeated a second place cup winner.

=== Appearances at the national championships ===
Académica Porto Novo has presented at the national championships 11 times. In 2003, the club suffered minimally as they conceded 9 goals, a third over their three goals scored and finished with just a point and was out from further competition, their worst was two matches which they lost 3 to 1 first to Nô Pintcha at Brava Island, then to São Nicolau's Ultramarina at home field. In 2005, they won their first match defeating Brava's SC Morabeza, a week later, it became their worst season ever for the club after a 10–1 loss to FC Derby from the adjacent island (São Vicente) down south and became their worst match at the nationals, that formed most of their goals conceded. Two more losses followed. The final match of the season which was on June 18 was a 4–2 win over Boa Vista's Estância Baixo who were regional runner-up as Sal Rei won the 2004 national title. Académica failed to appear in what would be their first playoff stage. Also they finished 6 points which was a record for the club.

Their next national appearance was in 2011, their first match was a scoreless draw with Praia's Boavista, another draw was followed and had goals that numbered two with Sal's Académico do Aeroporto. On May 28, they faced Rosariense Clube, champion from the north of the island and defeated 5–2 and started to make their best season overall, the last match of the season which was a fourth-round match (as the fifth round match was already removed as Brava had no competition) was a 4–0 win over Onze Unidos from Maio. In the regular season, they scored 11 goals which their club record for the regular season stood for six years but their overall remains into the present day and since 24 June 2017, is one of two seasons with 13 goals scored, also they finished with 8 points, a record stood for just a year.

A year later, they made a consecutive appearance and failed to attempt a new goal record as they just scored 10 goals that season but got a new point record of 10 which they finished for the next two years. Two of the five matches finished with 3 goals. 2013 was the year they made their third consecutive appearance for the club. They just scored only 5 goals but qualified into the playoff stage. Also for two seasons they had 3 wins, their highest in the regular season and since 2017 being one of four. Only 7 goals were scored in 2014 and finished with 8 points but qualified into the semis. Académica scored 5 goals and finished with 7 points but failed to qualify into the playoffs. For two seasons, they had only 2 wins.

Académica Porto Novo had three wins but scored only six goals in 2016 and finished with 11 points which got another playoff entry.

For the 2017 season, they made their eleventh appearance and out of the newly recreated three groups, they played twice with CS Mindelense from nearby São Vicente, Académico do Aeroporto from Sal and Paulense, winner of the North Zone. Being placed first in the best second-placed clubs of each group, the club again advanced into the playoffs for a consecutive season and was the first in the new format. Again, they finished with 11 points and had three wins, they also had 12 goals scored in the regular season which became a club record.

Académica Porto Novo was at the 2018 national division and in Group B, a different club than Académica da Praia from Santiago South.

==== National playoffs ====
Académica had their first, and successful, playoff appearance in 2011 when they faced Sporting Praia. They won the first match but failed to enter their first final appearance as they lost at home 0–4. In 2012 came a consecutive opportunity with Sporting Praia. Not a single goal was scored in two legs so gone was yet another opportunity for a first time appear in the finals.

In 2013, Académica Porto Novo again appeared in the semi's and defeated Desportivo Praia 3–0 in the first leg. They lost the second leg of only 1–0 in Praia, the national capital and later participated in the national finals for the first time, they played with Mindelense and lost 3–0, their second match was tied at 2 apiece and lost their chance to win their first national title. In 2014, they faced Mindelense from the neighboring island from down south in the semis, no goals were scored in the first leg, they lost the second leg 3–0 and was out from their first final appearance. Académica participated in the 2016 season, in the semis, they faced Derby from the neighboring island who was runner up of São Vicente as Mindelense was 2015 national champs, both legs ended in draws, first with nothing, then with two goals as the first two goals were scored away by Davi, they headed to their recent appearance at the finals and finished second behind Mindelense with 11 points and six goals scored, the club challenged FC Derby from the neighboring island and was tied with two goals each in two matches, the club advanced as they won two goals away, the club again challenged Mindelense in early July and won their only goal in their first match, as a total of a goal was scored in two of its matches, the second match went into extra time and then into the penalty shootout, the club lost to Mindelense and again failed their chance to win a national title. Académica also had 9 goals were scored, fewer than their previous appearances, but their goal total is 69 and became one of the records in the national probably equalling to Santiago North Zone's GD Varandinha in the same season. In 2017, Académica Porto Novo made another playoff debut with Sporting Praia once more from Santiago South, the first match ended in a goal draw, the club lost the second match 1–0 and gone was another showdown with Mindelense. Overall, the club's 13 goals tied their 2011 overall goal totals.

Académica got their ticket into the national championships for the 2018 season and were in Group A.

=== Other competitions ===
In October 2016, Académica along with Paulense of another league of the north of the island were participants from outside the neighboring island in the revived and reformatted Mindelo Cup, a competition that has not been held in several years, it featured the champion of São Vicente Mindelense and the cup winner of São Vicente Salamansa.

== Uniform ==
Home uniform up to September 2015
Away/Alternate uniform up to September 2015

Its uniform color is all coloured black for home games and a white T-shirt and black clothing uniform for away games.

Up to the end of the 2014–15 season, its uniform colors were black clothing with white striped sleeves and white socks for home games and its colors opposite with white clothing for away/alternate games.

Its former uniform colors were blue with a single white stripe, white sleeves and socks and blue shorts for home games and white clothing with blue sleeves and socks for visitor's games.

== Rivalry ==
The club's main rivalry is Paulense which remains to be their main inter-island rivalry, it was at the regional championships up to 2003 for some seasons, after the island leagues was broken up into two zones in 2003, the rivalry would be at the Santo Antão Cup and the Super Cup and the National Championships. The name is Santo Antão Derby or Clássico de Santo Antão. As Paulense finished last in the 2017–18 Santo Antão North Premier Division, the club was relegated and the rivalry came to an end.

The club's other rival is Sporting Porto Novo and has challenged sometimes into the present day. That is the only rivalry of the city of Porto Novo.

== Honours ==
- All-island:
  - Santo Antão Island League: 1

1996/97

  - Santo Antão Super Cup: 2

2015, 2016

- Regional:
  - Santo Antão Island League (South): 12

1997/98, 1999/2000, 2002/03, 2004/05, 2010/11, 2011/12, 2012/13, 2013/14, 2014/15, 2015/16, 2016/17, 2017/18

  - Porto Novo Cup: 12

1997/98, 1998/99, 1999/00, 2006/07, 2011/12, 2012/13, 2013/14, 2014/15, 2015/16, 2016/17

  - Porto Novo Super Cup: 6

2006/07, 2011/12, 2013/14, 2014/15, 2015/16, 2016/17

  - Porto Novo Opening Tournament: 9

1999/2000, 2000/01, 2003/04, 2006/07, 2010/11, 2011/12, 2012/13, 2014/15, 2017

== League and cup history ==
=== National championship ===
Season	Div.	Pos.	Pl.	W	D	L	GS	GA	GD	P	Cup	Notes	Playoffs
2003	1A	5	5	0	1	3	3	9	-6	1		Did not advance	Did not participate
2005	1B	4	5	2	0	3	9	18	-9	6		Did not advance	Did not participate
2011	1B	1	4	2	2	0	11	4	+7	8			Semi-finalist
2012	1B	2	5	3	1	1	10	6	+4	10	Finalist		4th place
2013	1B	2	5	3	1	1	5	1	+4	10	Not held		Finalist
2014	1A	2	5	2	2	1	7	2	+5	8	Not held		4th place
2015	1A	3	5	2	1	2	5	5	0	7	Not held	Did not advance	Did not participated
2016	1B	2	5	3	2	0	6	1	+5	11	Not held	Advanced into the playoffs	Finalist
2017	1B	2-Q	6	3	2	1	12	7	+5	11	Not held	Advanced into the playoffs	Semi-finalist
2018	1A	3	6	2	2	2	8	7	+1	8	Semi-finalist	Did not advance	Did not participate

=== Island/Regional Championship ===
Season	Div.	Pos.	Pl.	W	D	L	GS	GA	GD	P	Pto. Novo Cup	S. Antão Cup	S. Antão Super Cup	Opening	Notes
2001–02	2	2	12	5	2	5	18	24	-6	17					
2002–03	2	1	6	6	0	0	-	-	-	18					Promoted into the National Championships
2004–05	2	1	5	5	0	0	18	2	+16	15					Promoted into the National Championships
2005–06	2	3	6	1	2	3	8	8	0	5	Winner				
2006–07	2	2	6	2	2	2	4	2	+2	8					
2007–08	2	2	12	7	4	1	24	9	+15	25					
2008–09	2	7	12	2	3	7	10	20	-10	9					
2010–11	2	1	10	7	2	1	34	5	+29	23				Winner	Promoted into the National Championships
2011–12	2	1	6	6	0	0	20	3	+17	18	Winner			Winner	Promoted into the National Championships
2012–13	2	1	12	12	0	0	43	1	+42	36	Winner			Winner	Promoted into the National Championships
2013–14	2	1	12	11	1	0	37	5	+32	34	Winner			Not held	Promoted into the National Championships
2014–15	2	1	12	10	2	0	41	5	+36	32	Winner		Winner	Winner	Promoted into the National Championships
2015–16	2	1	12	11	0	1	60	6	+54	33	Winner	Semi-finalist	Winner	Not held	Promoted into the National Championships
2016–17	2	1	12	11	1	0	51	5	+46	34	Winner	Abandoned	Not Held	Not held	Promoted into the National Championships
2017–18	2	1	10	10	0	0	51	3	+49	30	In progress	Not held		Winner	To be promoted into the National Championships

== Statistics ==
- Best position: 2nd (national)
- Best position at a cup competition: 1st (regional)
- Appearances at the championships:
  - National: 11
  - Regional: c. 30
- Appearance in a cup competition:
  - Santo Antão Cup: 2
- Appearances at the Santo Antão Super Cup: 2
- Highest number of goals scored in a season:
  - Total: 69, in 2016
  - National (regular season): 12, in 2017
  - National (overall): 13, in 2011 and in 2017
  - Regional: 60, in 2016 – Regional record
- Highest number of points in a season:
  - National: 11
  - Regional: 36, in 2012 – Regional record
- Highest number of wins in a season:
  - National: 4
  - Regional: 12, in 2014
- Most games without a loss at the Regional Championships: 56 (5 March 2011 – April 23, 2016), Santo Antão South Zone – National record
- Most games without a loss at home at the Regional Championships: around 30 (since 2011) – National record
- Most games without a loss away at the Regional Championships: 28 (5 March 2011 – April 23, 2016) – National record
- Highest number of goals conceded in a season: 18 (national)
- Highest number of matches lost in a season: 3 (national)

- Other:
  - Appearance at the Mindelo Cup: Once, in 2016

== Players ==
=== Current squad ===
As of 15 February 2017

Note: Flags indicate national team as defined under FIFA eligibility rules; some limited exceptions apply. Players may hold more than one non-FIFA nationality.

No.	Pos.	Nation	Player
1	GK	CPV	Valdo
2	DF	CPV	Kevy
4	DF	CPV	Irlande
5	DF	CPV	Tony
6	MF	CPV	Levitson
7	MF	CPV	Denis
8	MF	CPV	Tchoiss
9	MF	CPV	Tiwi
10	FW	CPV	Oceano
11	FW	CPV	Xolote (Note: Formerly written as Scholot and Sholot)

No.	Pos.	Nation	Player
12	GK	CPV	Nuzuka
13	DF	CPV	Tartã (Note: Sometimes as Tartão)
14	MF	CPV	Tucim
15	MF	CPV	Nuno
17	FW	CPV	Faguy (Note: In English, he is known as Paguy)
18	MF	CPV	Lietson (Note: Also as Liedson or Leedson)
19	MF	CPV	Macky (Note: Also as Maky not as Mackie)
21	DF	CPV	Ady
22	DF	CPV	Kareka

== Chairmen history ==
- (Cape Verde) Elísio Silva (up to November 6, 2015)
- (Cape Verde) Osvaldinho Silva Lopes (since November 6, 2015)
