= Santo Antão Island competitions =

Football or soccer competitions had and have taken part in the island of Santo Antão. The island championship existed for nine years. The single island cup and super cup competitions were introduced in late 2015. The cup and super cup are held along with two other regional versions. The opening tournament is a single island competition.

== Santo Antão Island Championships ==
Santo Antão Island League/Championships
- Region: Santo Antão Island, Cape Verde
- Promotion to: Cape Verdean Football Championship
- Current champions: Sanjoanense (1st time)
- Most championships: Solpontense (4 times)

The Santo Antão Island Championships was a regional championship that played in all of the island of Santo Antão, Cape Verde until 2002 when it was split up into two present-day divisions of North (then Ribeira Grande) and South/Porto Novo, though it was split up in 1998 but it continued for four years before the final split up, in 1999 and 2000, only a single match occurred as the winner of the south competed with the winner of the north. The winner of the championship had played in Cape Verdean football Championships of each season. The championships were restored in the 2001 season and continued without the north and south zones for two more years.

The island league was formed in the late 1980s and was the shortest existed island leagues up to its breakup in 2002.

=== Winners ===
- 1988/89: Rosariense Clube
- 1989/90: unknown
- 1990/91: Rosariense Clube
- 1992-93: unknown
- 1993/94 : Rosariense Clube
- 1994/95 : Rosariense Clube
- 1995/96 : Solpontense Futebol Clube
- 1996/97 : Associação Académica do Porto Novo
- 1997/98 : not known
- 1998/99 : Solpontense Futebol Clube beat Marítimo
- 1999/00 : Solpontense Futebol Clube beat Associação Académica do Porto Novo
- 2000/01 : Solpontense Futebol Clube
- 2001/02 : Sanjoanense (Porto Novo)

=== Performance by club ===
Club	Winners	Winning years
Rosariense Clube	4	1989, 1991, 1994, 1995
Solpontense Futebol Clube	4	1996, 1999, 2000, 2001
Associação Académica do Porto Novo	1	1997
Sanjoanense (Porto Novo)	1	2002

== After the break up to the single island cup and cup competitions ==
The competition between a club from the North and the South zones in the same group only occurred at the national championships for several seasons before the single cup and super cup were created. The first was in 2005 where Académica Porto Novo faced Rosariense, several other times occurred up to 2015 including Fiorentina-Solpontense and Marítimo Porto Novo-Solpontense, their recent was with Académica and Paulense. This will change as Académica and Paulense will participate twice for the 2017 season in one of three groups, Group A.

== Santo Antão Super Cup ==
The first ever single island super cup took place in December. The matches started at the semi-finals with a single match then the winner headed to the finals. The champion winner of the south competes with the winner of the north, another bracket features a cup winner (sometimes second place) of the south competes with the cup winner of the north instead of having the super cup winner of the south with the super cup winner of the north. As champion of the south zone, Académica of Porto Novo won two titles in 2015 and in 2016.

=== Winners ===
- 2014-15: Académica do Porto Novo
- 2015-16: Académica do Porto Novo

=== Participant history ===
- Académica do Porto Novo (South Zone): 2
- Lajedos (South Zone): Once
- Marítimo (South Zone): Once
- Paulense (North Zone): 2
- CD Sinagoga (North Zone): Once

=== Planned 2017 edition ===
For the 2017 edition, all four clubs wereadded, it will be Paulense who will make their third entrant and second as champion of the North Zone, Académica who will make their third entrant as champion of the South Zone and two first timers, Sanjoanense, their entrant became the cup winner Rosariense. Later, the 2017 edition was not held, second time since 2008 for the island.

== Santo Antão Cup ==
The first ever single island cup began competition in January 2007, the second one took place in January 2016 and the third started in January 2017. Several clubs compete in the competition instead of a cup winner from north or south. The first winner was Rosariense, the second winner was Lajedos.

The second edition took place on April 1 featuring Académica Porto Novo (South) and Rosariense (North), Rosariense withdrew and the match was not played and came out without a winner.

== See also ==
- Sports in Santo Antão, Cape Verde
