= Ribeira da Cruz =

- Settlement
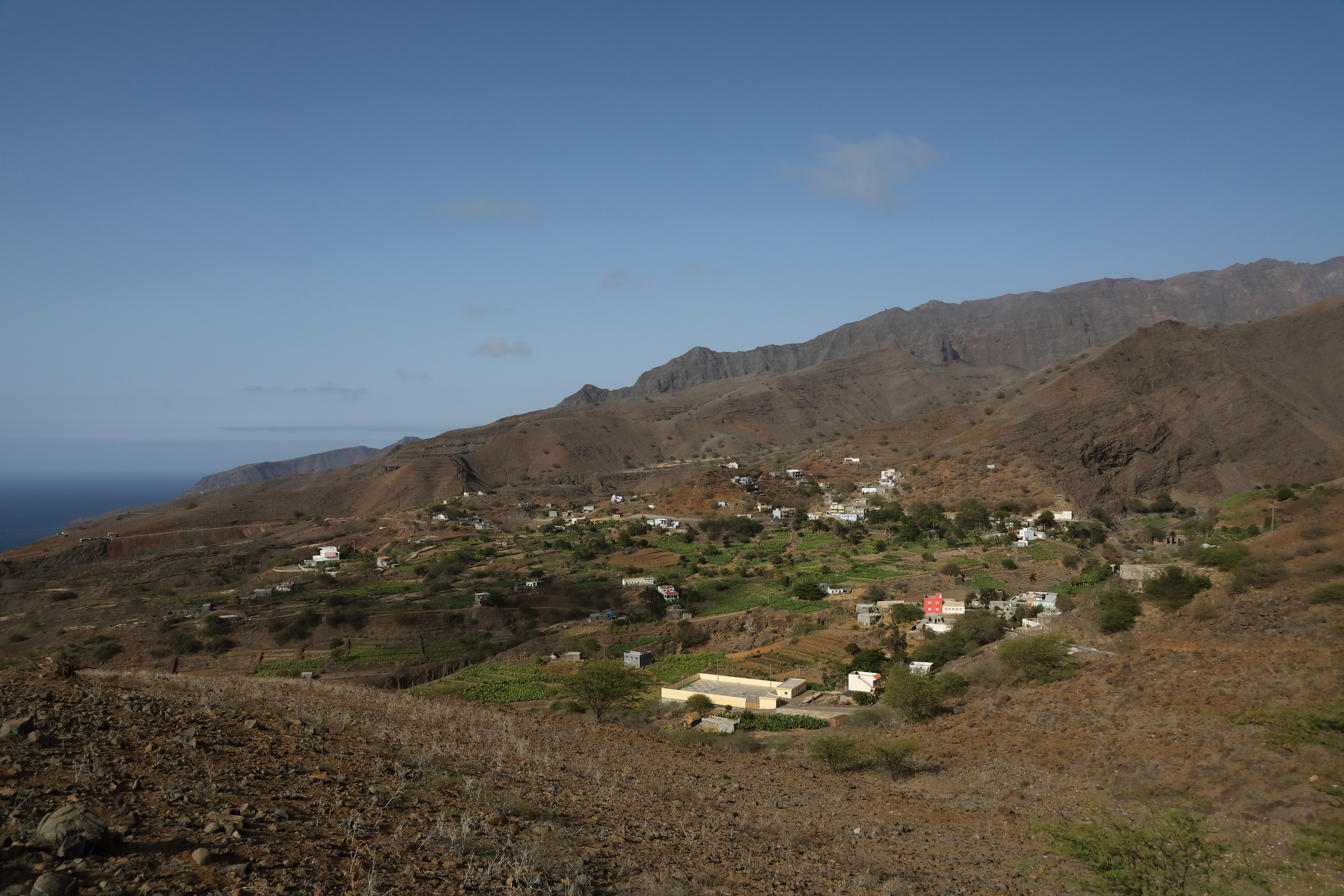

- Location within Cape Verde
- Coordinates: 17.107°N 25.245°W
- Country: Cape Verde
- Island: Santo Antão
- Municipality: Porto Novo
- Civil parish: Santo André

Population (2010)
  - Total: 421
- ID: 13208

Ribeira da Cruz is a settlement in the northwestern part of the island of Santo Antão, Cape Verde. Situated 22 km northwest of the island capital Porto Novo, it is part of the parish of Santo André, in the municipality of Porto Novo. It had 421 inhabitants at the 2010 census.

== See also ==
- List of villages and settlements in Cape Verde
