= CF Sanjoanense (Porto Novo) =

Football club in Cape Verde

Sanjoanense Sanjoanensi Sanjoanense
- Full name: Clube de Futebol Os Sanjoanenses
- Founded: February 4, 1984
- Ground: Ribeira das Pratas, Estádio Municipal, Porto Novo, Santo Antão, Cape Verde
- League: Santo Antão Island League (South)
- 2016–17: 3rd

Clube de Futebol Os Sanjoanenses, also known as Sanjoanense (Capeverdean Crioulo, ALUPEC or ALUPEK: Sanjoanensi, also in the other Capeverdean Crioulo forms of the Santo Antão and the São Vicente Crioulos), is a football club that currently plays in the Santo Antão Island League South Zone in Cape Verde. It is based in the town of Porto Novo in the northern part of the island of Santo Antão.

== History ==
The club was founded on February 4, 1984 and was called Futebol Clube Esperança (FC Esperança). In 1996, the club changed its name to Sanjoanense after Saint John, the patron saint of Porto Novo.

The team is the only one of the four teams in the division that never won any title since the breakup of the island division in 1997. Recently the club cannot afford to compete in the island league due to the financial reasons in the early 2010s.

The club won their regional title and was their last title before breakup in 2002 and brought their only appearance in the championships. The club finished 7th with 6 points, 2 wins and scored 8 goals. The only wins were in weeks 1 and 5, both of them 2–1 to Onze Unidos and Académica da Brava. The last match ended in a loss to Académica Fogo 5–1 on June 29 and was the club worst defeat at the nationals.

Later, the club won their only cup title in 2005.

Between 1984 and 2012, it was of the westernmost football (soccer) clubs in the whole of Africa, Tarrafal de Monte Trigo took the spot afterwards.

Sanjoanense missed the 2012 season due to financial problems of the club, they returned for the next three seasons. Together with Santo André (based in Ribeira da Cruz), the club withdrew and was absent from the 2015/16 season due to financial concerns. Together with another club who withdrew last season, they returned for the 2016/17 season and faced off with each other, Sanjoanense defeated Santo André 4–0 in the first round on November 12 and took first place at the second round after defeating Fiorentina Porto Novo, a week later, they lost and was put to third, they were second in the fifth round and scored 17 goals in five rounds, more than all the goals scored in the 2013–14 season and fewer than their last appearance, after their loss to Lajedos on January 14, they were put third again and remained for the remainder of the season in the last few rounds, they were successful in goal scoring alongside Lajedos behind Académica's but lost it before the season ended, after the end of the 14th round, the club finished third, Sanjoanense likely made a club record with 37 goals scored, second after Académica's.

Sanjoanense entered qualification into the South Zone's cup final, as Académica became regional champions on March 18, a club who also qualified into the cup final, Sanjoanense received their first entry into the upcoming 2016 Santo Antão Super Cup, on April 22/23, they would qualify into both as the South Zone's runner-up after a loss to Académica Porto Novo in the Cup final.

== Logo ==
Its logo and uniform is same to that of the Portuguese club Os Belenenses and is a club affiliate, the acronym reads "CFS", Clube Sportivo Joanense and the founding date at the bottom.

== Honours ==
- Santo Antão Island League: 1

2001/02

- Porto Novo Cup: 1

2004/05

== League and cup history ==
=== National championship ===
Season	Div.	Pos.	Pl.	W	D	L	GS	GA	GD	P	Notes
2002	1	7	8	2	0	6	8	21	-13	6	

=== Island/Regional Championship ===
==== Santo Antão Island League ====
Season	Div.	Pos.	Pl.	W	D	L	GS	GA	GD	P	Notes
2001–02	2	1	-	-	-	-	-	-	-	-	

==== Santo Antão Island League (South) ====
Season	Div.	Pos.	Pl.	W	D	L	GS	GA	GD	P	Cup	Tour	Notes
2013–14	2	4	12	4	2	6	14	17	-3	14			
2014–15	2	3	12	6	2	4	21	19	+2	20			
2016–17	2	3	12	7	2	3	37	13	+24	23	Finalist		
2017–18	2	6	10	1	2	7	6	30	-24	5	In progress		

== Statistics ==
- Best position: 7th (national)
- Best position at a cup competition: 1st (regional)
- Appearances at the Santo Antão Cup: Once, in 2016
- Total matches played: 7 (national)
- Total points: 6 (national)
- Total wins: 2 (national)
- Total goals scored: 8 (national)
- Total losses: 6 (national)
- Total goals conceded: 21 (national)
- Worst defeat at the National Championships: Académica do Fogo 5 – 1 Sanjoanense, 29 June 2002
