= Sporting Clube de Porto Novo =

- Full name: Sporting Clube de Porto Novo
- Nickname: leonino (little lion)
- Founded: August 18, 1956
- Ground: Porto Novo, Cape Verde
- Chairman: José Salomão
- League: Santo Antão Island League (South)
- 2016–17: 6th
Home colours	Away colours

Sporting Clube de Porto Novo (Capeverdean Crioulo, ALUPEC or ALUPEK: Sporting Klubi di Purtu Nobu) is a football club that had played in the Premier division and plays in the Santo Antão Island South Zone Division in Cape Verde. It is based in the island of Santo Antão. The club was founded in 1956 and is the island's oldest sporting club. Geographically it was once the westernmost sporting club in Cape Verde and the whole of Africa, now it is one of several today.

Sporting Porto Novo is the second most successful football (soccer) club in the South Zone having won about 5 official regional titles, overall it is fourth with the North Zone's Rosariense Clube with 8 official regional and subregional titles combined.

== History ==
The club was founded in 1956. The name is identical to the Sporting Clube de Portugal and is club affiliate number 180. The club was called Sporting Clube de Carvoeiros; when the new port was completed in 1962, it adopted the current name of Sporting Clube de Porto Novo. Its uniform is different from Sporting Praia: it only has a green striped t-shirt and the remainder is white for home games and all white for away games.

The club celebrated its 25th anniversary in 1981 and later its 50th anniversary in 2006.

From 2006 until 2007, the team was tied at second for having the island's most titles before having two titles after their win after Maritimo in which they were last in its number of titles until 2010, which meant it entered the national division for the second time.

Sporting Porto Novo suffered during the 2015/16 season which the club only had a win and three points; the club scored only 8 goals and conceded 46 which was their highest. The most sufferable was their loss in week 13, the second last where the club lost 11 to Académica do Porto Novo, the worst match in club history, their final match of the season.

The club started off the 2016–17 season early on November 13 and faced Académica Porto Novo and the rematch was yet again a suffering one as they lost 7–0. Sporting who was last placed became sixth recently in the 7th round on January 22. Sporting's 11 match winless streak was finished on February 18 where they defeated Santo André 0–2, on February 25, they defeated Lajedos who was attempting to become first place in the region. At the 11th round, the club was 6th and had two wins and two draws, better than their last season's results but not the 2014–15 season, the remaining two matches ended in draws and the club finished sixth with 10 points, ahead of Santo André.

Sporting began the 2017–18 season with an attempt to break Académica Porto Novo's title record, they started with a win over Fiorentina Porto Novo, then their chances began to slip when they lost to Académica at the second round, a scoreless draw with Os Sanjoanense followed and their chance continued to slip. Sporting defeated Marítimo 0–1 on January 19. Another win came on January 27 as they defeated Inter. A goal draw with Marítimo was made next and most of its championship title chance was fading. Sporting defeated Inter 0–1 on February 16 and all of their chance for another title totally disappeared. Sporting lost 0–1 to Os Sanjoanenses in their recent match. Sporting was second, with two more matches, a two-goal draw with Fiorentina Porto Novo was made, then a loss to Académica in what may become a new and only rivalry after the end of the Santo Antão Derby as Paulense was relegated. Sporting finished better with second position. Sporting had a low goal scoring with only nine, the fifth least to Os Sanjoanenses.

=== National competition ===
In 2006 and 2007, Sporting Porto Novo headed to the nationals and the club would rank last in Group B and did not advance. One of the matches in 2007 was with Rosariense, their next challenge with a club that was once with the same regional association, it took place on May 26, 2007, and lost 3–0. at the nationals In 2009, the club won their third and last title on the island and remains second in the total number of titles in Porto Novo and area after Académica. The club entered the national division for the third and final time and had a better appearance headed to the semis and challenged Académica from Praia, the first match lost 1–4 and the second was scoreless and would be eliminated from the playoffs, the club ranked 3rd with a single point.

=== Other competitions ===
Other titles have three in its opening tournament, and one in cup and super cup events.

Sporting first appeared in the 2016 Santo Antão Cup and only played a match and afterwards out of the competition, their next meeting with Rosariense in nearly nine years and lost to that club. In the second edition, Sporting challenged with CD Sinagoga for the first time and lost to that club.

== Logo ==
Unlike other Sporting affiliates in Cape Verde and a Sporting affiliate in Sal called Palmeira de Santa Maria. Its logo is different from Sporting Lisbon's and is colored brown.

== Rivalries ==
Sporting's only rivalry was with Paulense and formed the Derby Eterno de Santo Antão (Eternal Derby of Santo Antão). After the championship fully became two. The rivalry disappeared. The matches with Paulense never appeared at the Santo Antão Cup as Sporting lost a match and was immediately out. Sporting's only rival today is with Académica of the same town.

== Honours ==
- Santo Antão Island League (South): 3

2005/06, 2006/07, 2008/09

- Santo Antão South/Porto Novo Opening Tournament: 4

2005, 2006, 2008, 2009

- Porto Novo Cup: 1

2005

- Porto Novo Super Cup: 1

2010

== League and cup history ==
=== National championship ===
Season	Div.	Pos.	Pl.	W	D	L	GS	GA	GD	P	Notes	Playoffs
2006	1A	5	4	0	0	4	0	12	-12	0	Did not advance	Did not participate
2007	1B	6	5	0	0	5	5	20	-15	0	Did not advance	Did not participate
2009	1B	2	5	3	0	2	9	6	+3	9	Advanced into the playoffs	3rd place
Total:			14	3	0	11	14	38	-24	8		

=== Island/Regional Championship ===
Season	Div.	Pos.	Pl.	W	D	L	GS	GA	GD	P	Cup	Tour	Notes
2005–06	2	1	10	-	-	-	-	-	-	-		Winner	Promoted into the National Championships
2006–07	2	1	10	-	-	-	-	-	-	-			Promoted into the National Championships
2008–09	2	1	10	-	-	-	-	-	-	-			Promoted into the National Championships
2013–14	2	6	12	3	1	8	11	22	-11	10			
2014–15	2	4	12	4	1	7	14	22	-8	13			
2015–16	2	7	12	1	0	11	8	46	-38	3			
2016–17	2	3	12	2	4	6	13	40	-27	10			
2017–18	2	2	10	4	3	3	9	11	-2	15	In progress		

== Statistics ==
- Best ranking: 3rd (national)
- Best position at a cup competition: 1st (regional)
- Best position at an opening tournament: 1st
- Appearances:
  - National: 3
  - Regional: 23
- Appearances at the Santo Antão Cup: 2
- Total matches played: 16 (national)
  - Total matches played at home: 6
  - Total matches played away: 10
- Total points: 9 (national)
- Total wins: 4 (national)
- Total goals scored: 15 (national)
- Highest number of goals scored in a season: 10 (national), in 2009
- Highest scoring match(es) at the National Championships: Morabeza 0–3 Sporting Porto Novo, 13 June 2009
- Lowest number of goals scored in a season: none (national), two seasons: in 2006 and 2007
- Highest number of points in a season: 9 (national), 2010
- Total losses: 12 (national)
- Total goals conceded: 38 (national)
- Lowest number of goals scored in a season: 5 (national), in 2007
- Highest number of matches lost in a season: 5 (national), in 2009
- Highest number of goals conceded in a season:
  - National: 20, in 2007
  - Regional: 46, in 2016
- Worst defeat:
  - National Championships:
    - Académico Aeroporto 8–3 Sporting Porto Novo, 12 May 2009
    - Botafogo 5–0 Sporting Porto Novo, 25 May 2006
  - Regional championships:
    - Académica Porto Novo 11–0 Sporting Porto Novo, April 16, 2016
  - Overall: Académica Porto Novo 11–0 Sporting Porto Novo, April 16, 2016

== See also ==
- Other clubs named "Sporting" in Cape Verde:
  - Sporting Clube da Praia
  - Sporting (Boa Vista Island)
  - Sporting (Brava)
