= Grupo Desportivo, Recreativo e Cultural Fiorentina =

Fiorentina
- Full name: Grupo Desportivo, Recreativo e Cultural Fiorentina; Grupo Desportivo, Recreativo e Cultural Fiorentina de Santo Antão
- Founded: 1994
- Ground: Porto Novo on Santo Antão Island, Cape Verde
- Chairman: Lenine Rocha
- Manager: Kinka
- League: Santo Antão Island League (South)
- 2016–17: 4th
Home colours

For the Italian football (soccer) club, see Fiorentina

Grupo Desportivo, Recreativo e Cultural Fiorentina is a football club that plays in the city of Porto Novo on the island of Santo Antão in Cape Verde. The team has been competing in the Santo Antão Island League (South) since 2007.

== History ==
The club was founded in 1994. It is not the only club with the name Fiorentina in Cape Verde, another is Fiorentina-Calabaceira, a member of the Santiago South Regional Football Association.

The club won their first trophy in 1997. After celebrating the 10th anniversary of its foundation, Fiorentina became an official registered club in 2005. It formally became a member of the Santo Antão South Regional Football Association (ARFSSA), in 2007. The following year, alongside Lajedos (known then as Lagedos) and Inter, they played their first match. In the same year, they won their first title, having won their league on their island and earned a place in the national championship. However, in the final series, they did not win a single game and only had two ties, finishing with a total of two points.

Due to financial problems and flagging popularity, Fiorentina did not appear in the competition in 2011 nor 2012, nor from 2014 to 2015. The club returned during the 2015-16 season, their first and last matches were against Lajedos. Unlike some other leagues and championships, the half-season meetings were out of order. The club finished fifth with four wins, two draws, five losses and 14 points. In 2017, Fiorentina finished fourth with 12 points, but with two less than the previous season: three wins and draws and six losses.

== Honours ==
- Santo Antão Island League (South): 1

2007/08

== League and cup history ==
=== National championship ===
Season	Div.	Pos.	Pl.	W	D	L	GS	GA	GD	P	Cup	Notes	Playoffs
2008	1B	5	5	0	2	3	2	8	-6	2		Did not advance	Did not participate
Total:			5	0	2	3	2	8	-6	2			

=== Island/Regional Championship ===
Season	Div.	Pos.	Pl.	W	D	L	GS	GA	GD	P	Cup	Tour	Notes
2007–08	2	1	-	-	-	-	-	-	-	-			Promoted into the National Championships
2008–09	2		-	-	-	-	-	-	-	-			
2015–16	2	5	12	4	2	5	18	34	-16	14			
2016–17	2	4	12	3	3	6	15	21	-6	12			
2017–18	2	4	10	4	1	5	17	21	-4	13			

== Statistics ==
- Best position: 5th – Group Stage (national)
- Appearances at championship competitions:
  - National: Once, in 2008
  - Regional: 6
- Appearance at a super cup competition: Once, in 2008
- Appearances at cup competitions:
  - Santo Antão South: 6
  - Santo Antão: 2
- Appearance at opening tournaments: 4
- Total goals scored: 2 (national)
- Total points: 2 (national)
- Worst defeat at the Regional championships: Fiorentina 0–10 Académica do Porto Novo, February 27, 2016
