= Santo André (Porto Novo) =

- Civil parish
- Coordinates: 17.08°N 25.28°W
- Country: Cape Verde
- Island: Santo Antão
- Municipality: Porto Novo

Population (2010)
  - Total: 3,441
- ID: 132

Santo André is a freguesia (civil parish) of Cape Verde. It covers the smaller, northwestern part of the municipality of Porto Novo, on the island of Santo Antão.

== Settlements ==
The freguesia consists of the following settlements (population at the 2010 census):

- Alto Mira (pop: 1,003)
- Chã de Branquinho (pop: 114)
- Chã de Norte (pop: 241)
- Jorge Luis (pop: 347)
- Martiene (pop: 446)
- Monte Trigo (pop: 274)
- Norte (pop: 595)
- Ribeira da Cruz (pop: 421)
