= Santo Antão South Island Championships =

- Founded: 1997
- Region: Municipality of Porto Novo, Santo Antão Island, Cape Verde
- Head: Fernando Lima
- Number of clubs: 8
- Promotion to: Cape Verdean Football Championship
- Domestic cup(s): Porto Novo Cup; Porto Novo Super Cup; Porto Novo Opening Tournament
- Current champions: Associação Académica do Porto Novo (12th time) (2017–18)
- Most championships: Associação Académica do Porto Novo (12 times)
- Website: Official website

The Santo Antão Island League (South) is a regional championship played in Porto Novo, Santo Antão Island, Cape Verde. The winner of the championship plays in Cape Verdean football Championships of each season. The championship is organized by the Santo Antão South Regional Football Association (Associação Regional de Futebol de Zona Sul do Santo Antão, ARFZSSA). It has one of the fewest teams in the Capeverdean football or soccer ahead of Brava's and São Nicolau's. Its current head is Fernando Lima since late 2016.

== About the Island/Regional League ==
Before 2002, the top two champions competed into the single island competition until 2003.

Until the early 2000s was the only island league in Cape Verde to have all of its football clubs in one town and also where there are no teams in the western half (though included) of the island due to a slightly low population, now the population compared to the eastern part is around half. The clubs are throughout the area.

Académica has the most island titles with twelve, second is Sporting with three, third is Maritimo with two and Fiorentina with a title won in 2008.

Académica Porto Novo was the first champ won in 1998, Marítimo became the second champ a year later, Académica won their second a year later, the club won two more in 2005 minus the cancelled 2004 season. Sporting won two consecutive in 2007, Fiorentina won their only title in 2008, Sporting again with their recent title in 2009 and Marítimo's second and recent title in 2010. Académica has recently won seven consecutive champ titles in 2017, of any regional championships, it became the next club after Botafogo of Fogo and Mindelense of São Vicente to do so.

Académica Porto Novo holds the record having not a single loss in 60 matches, the record includes that of the South Zone Cup and the Super Cup which totals about 70. The record lasted from 2011 to April 23, 2016. Académica's next loss in a few seasons was at the final week losing to their second rival Marítimo 2–1. Overall in any of the island leagues, Académica had about four years without a loss, though in a championship with a club less than São Vicente's and no second division, the record is tied with CS Mindelense's. Académica's overall 13 total is more than any club who has the second most championship titles of any region except Fogo.

One of the teams that scored the most goals in a season was Académica do Porto Novo numbering 60. One of the highest scoring matches in the championship was Académica who defeated Sporting with a high scoring match of 11–0 on week 13, the final match of the 2016 season.

== Santo Antão Island League (South) - Clubs 2017/18 ==
- Académica Porto Novo
- Fiorentina Porto Novo
- Inter Porto Novo
- Marítimo - Porto Novo
- Sanjoanense - Ribeira da Pratas
- Sporting Porto Novo

=== Withdrawn clubs ===
- Lajedos
- Santo André - based in Ribeira da Cruz
- Tarrafal FC de Monte Trigo

== Winners ==
- 1997/98 : Académica do Porto Novo
- 1998/99 : Marítimo (Porto Novo)
- 1999/00 : Académica do Porto Novo
- 2000-02 : not held as the Santo Antão Island League continued without the two zones
- 2002/03 : Académica do Porto Novo
- 2003/04 : not held
- 2004/05 : Académica do Porto Novo
- 2005/06 : Sporting Clube do Porto Novo
- 2006/07 : Sporting Clube do Porto Novo
- 2007/08 : Grupo Desportivo, Recreativo e Cultural Fiorentina
- 2008/09 : Sporting Clube do Porto Novo
- 2009/10 : Marítimo (Porto Novo)
- 2010/11 : Académica Porto Novo
- 2011/12 : Académica Porto Novo
- 2012/13 : Académica Porto Novo
- 2013/14 : Académica Porto Novo
- 2014/15 : Académica Porto Novo
- 2015-16: Académica Porto Novo
- 2016-17: Académica Porto Novo
- 2017–18: Académica Porto Novo

=== Performance by club ===
Club	Winners	Winning years
Associação Académica do Porto Novo	12	1998, 2000, 2003, 2005, 2011, 2012, 2013, 2014, 2015, 2016, 2017, 2018
Sporting Clube do Porto Novo	3	2006, 2007, 2009
Marítimo (Porto Novo)	2	2000, 2010
Grupo Desportivo, Recreativo e Cultural Fiorentina	1	2008

== Seasons by club ==
The left indicates the participation in the South Zone, inside the bracket is overall participation as one island and the South Zone.

Seasons	Clubs
15 (c. 35)	Académica do Porto Novo
15 (c. 35)	Sporting Porto Novo
13 (c. 35)	Os Sanjoanenses
10 (c. 35)	Marítimo Porto Novo
9	Inter Porto Novo
7	Lajedos
7	Fiorentina Porto Novo
5	Santo André
3	Tarrafal de Monte Trigo

== See also ==
- Porto Novo Cup
- Porto Novo Super Cup
- Porto Novo Opening Tournament
