= Porto Novo, Cape Verde (municipality) =

Municipality of Cape Verde

Porto Novo
- Municipality
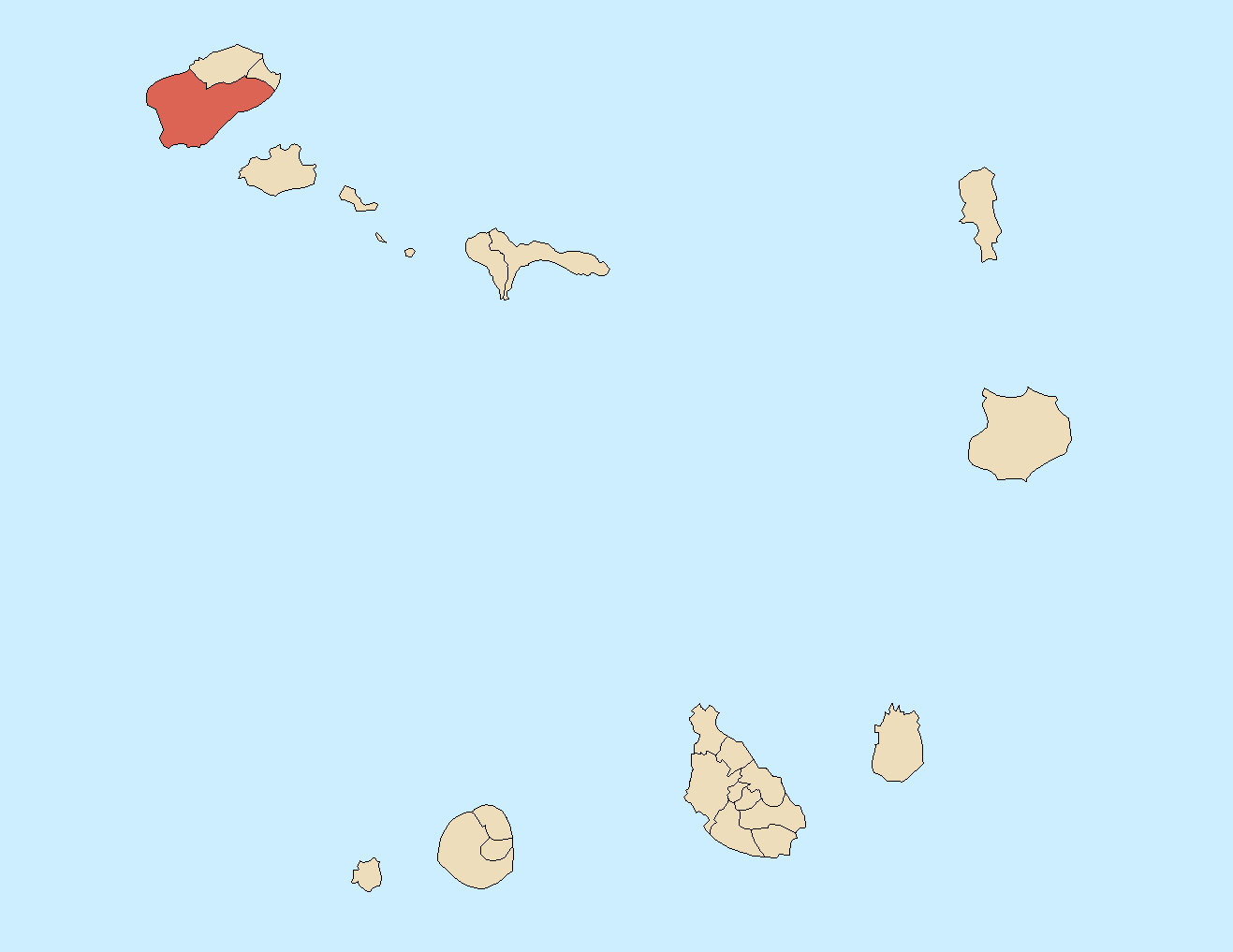
- Coordinates: 17.04°N 25.16°W
- Country: Cape Verde
- Island: Santo Antão

Area
  - Total: 564.3 km^{2} (217.9 sq mi)

Population (2010)
  - Total: 18,028
  - Density: 31.95/km^{2} (82.74/sq mi)
- ID: 13

Porto Novo is a concelho (municipality) of Cape Verde. Situated in the southern part of the island of Santo Antão, it covers 72% of the island area (564.3 km^{2}), and is home to 41% of its population. Its population at the 2010 census was 18,028. Its capital is the town Porto Novo. Its highest point, which is also the highest point of the entire island, is Tope de Coroa, elevation 1,979 metres (6,493 feet). The municipality of Porto Novo was created in 1962 when the parishes of São João Baptista and Santo André were separated from the older Municipality of Paul.

== Subdivisions ==
The municipality consists of two freguesias (civil parishes):

- Santo André
- São João Baptista

== Demography ==
Population of Porto Novo (1940—2010)
Year	Population
1940	10,366
1950	7,565
1960	10,683
1970	13,750
1980	13,236
1990	14,873
2000	17,191
2010	18,028

== Politics ==
Since 2016, the Movement for Democracy (MpD) is the ruling party of the municipality. The results of the latest elections, in 2016:

Party	Municipal Council		Municipal Assembly	
Party	Votes%	Seats	Votes%	Seats
MpD	49.79	7	50.08	9
PAICV	46.78	0	46.27	8

== Twin towns – sister cities ==
Porto Novo is twinned with three municipalities in Portugal: Angra do Heroísmo, Estarreja and Tavira.
