= Porto Novo, Cape Verde =

Porto Novo
- Settlement
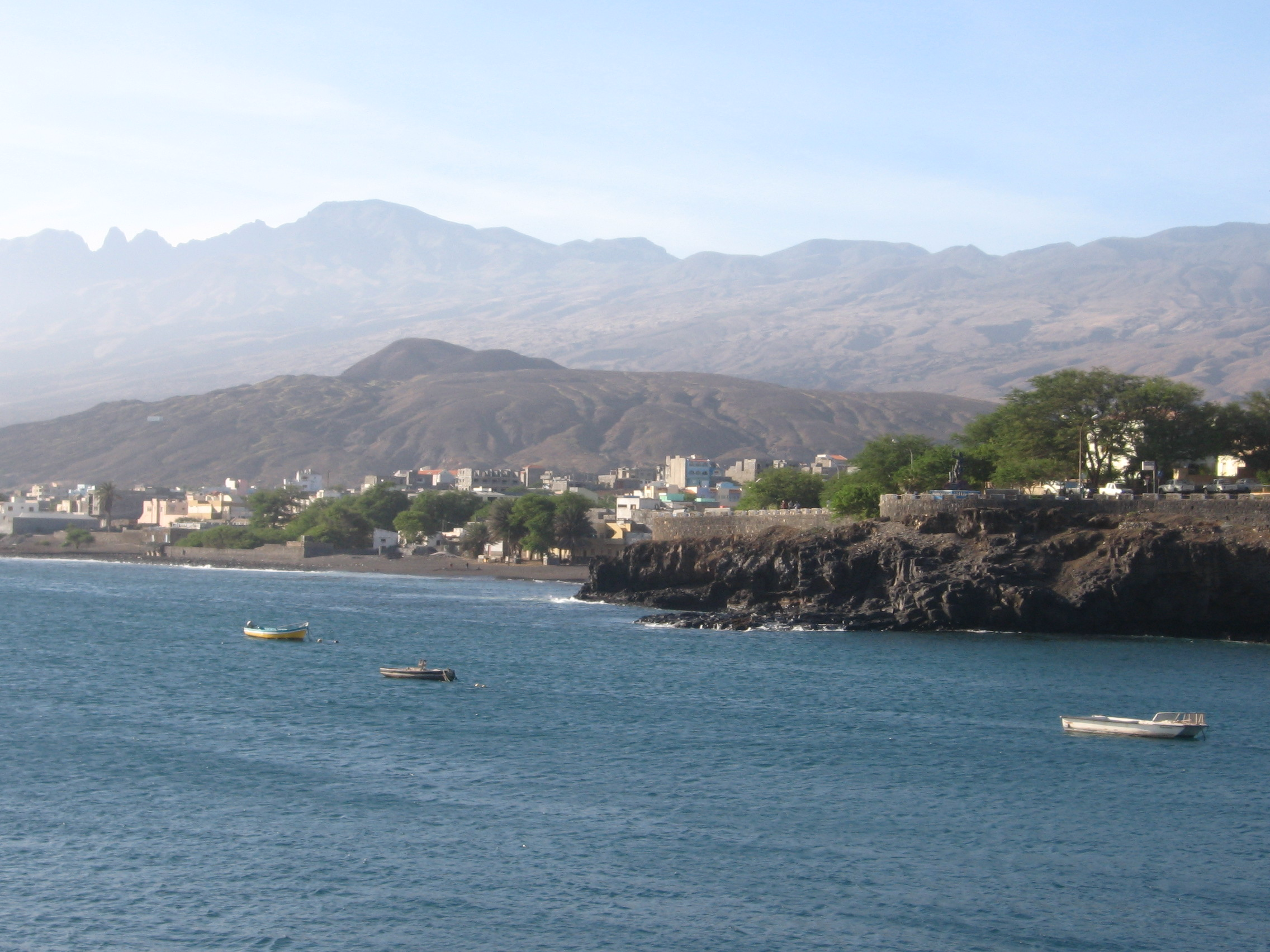

- Location within Cape Verde
- Coordinates: 17.019°N 25.064°W
- Country: Cape Verde
- Island: Santo Antão
- Municipality: Porto Novo
- Civil parish: São João Baptista
- Elevation: 8 m (26 ft)

Population (2010)
  - Total: 9,310
- Postal code: 1310
- ID: 13122

Porto Novo is a city in the island of Santo Antão, in Cape Verde. It is the seat of the Porto Novo municipality. At the 2010 census, the town had 9,310 inhabitants, which makes it the most populous settlement of the island.

== Geography ==
Porto Novo is situated on the southeastern coast of Santo Antão, opposite the island São Vicente.

The city is divided into the following sections:

- Abufador
- Alto de Peixinho
- Alto de São Tomé
- Armazém
- Bairro
- Berlim
- Branquinho
- Chã de Camoca
- Chã de Galinheira
- Chã de Itália
- Chã de Matinho
- Covoada
- Lombo Branco
- Lombo de Meio
- Praia de Topo
- Ribeira Corujinho
- São Tomé

== Demography ==
Population of the town of Porto Novo (1990–2010)
1990	2000	2010
4867	7685	9310

== History ==
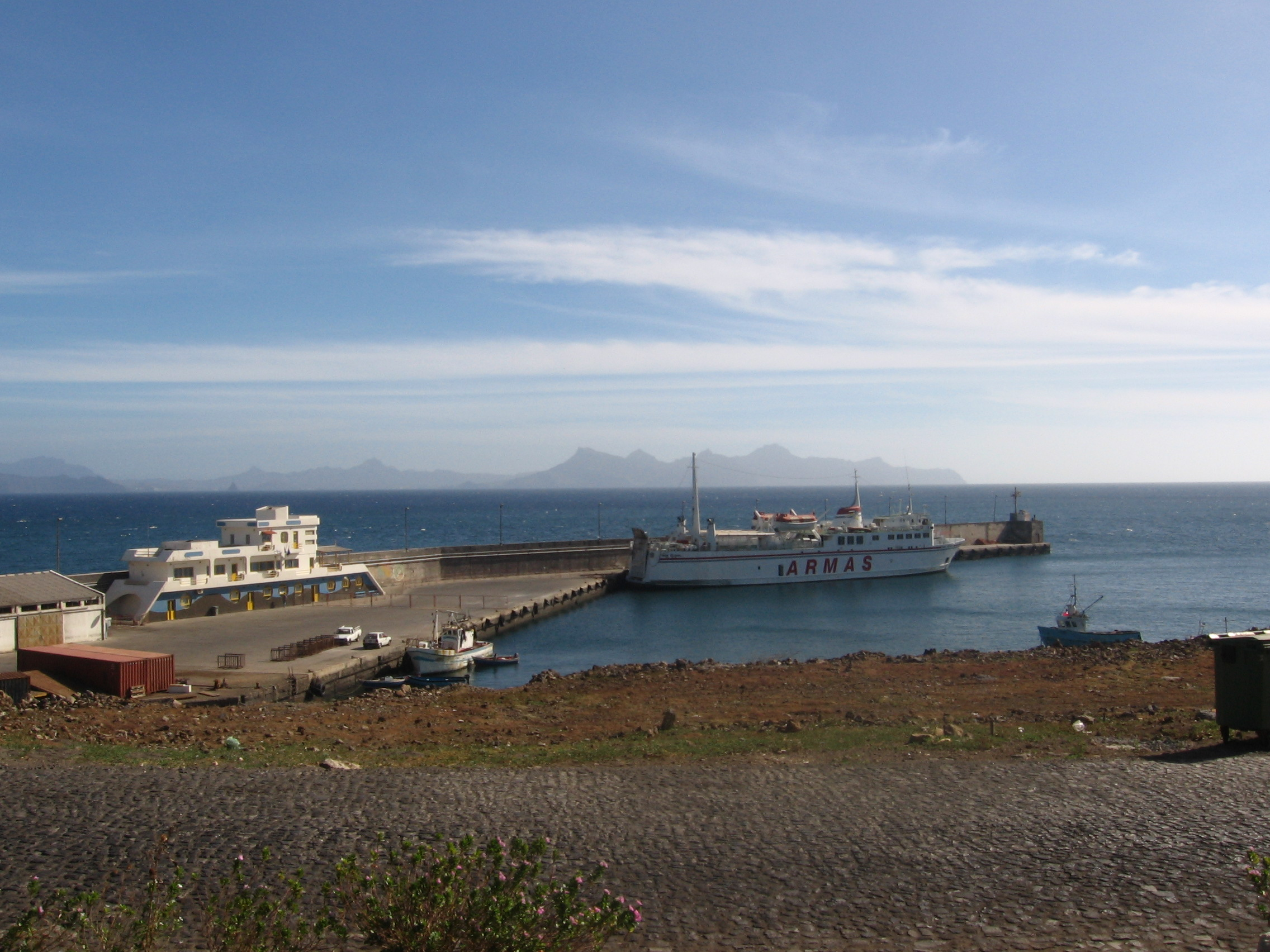
Porto Novo harbour, and behind, the island of São Vicente

Due to the aridity of the south coast of Santo Antão, settlement began relatively late. The city was initially a fishing village called Porto dos Carvoeiros. From only 30 dispersed buildings in 1901, it started growing in the 1910s. The port was inaugurated in 1962, and modernized in 2012-14. Before 1962, ships had to anchor in the bay of Alto Peixinho, and goods and passengers had to be brought ashore with small boats. The seat of the Porto Novo municipality created in 1962, it gradually became the largest urban settlement of the island. In 2005 the town of Porto Novo became a city.

== Climate ==
Porto Novo has a hot arid climate (Köppen BWh). Its annual precipitation is 191 millimetres or 7.52 inches. The average annual temperature is 23.8 °C (74.8 °F).

Climate data for Porto Novo, 17 metres ASL
Month	Jan	Feb	Mar	Apr	May	Jun	Jul	Aug	Sep	Oct	Nov	Dec	Year
Mean daily maximum °C (°F)	24.0 (75.2)	23.4 (74.1)	24.1 (75.4)	24.6 (76.3)	25.3 (77.5)	26.2 (79.2)	27.3 (81.1)	27.9 (82.2)	27.6 (81.7)	27.5 (81.5)	27.0 (80.6)	25.2 (77.4)	25.8 (78.4)
Daily mean °C (°F)	22.0 (71.6)	21.6 (70.9)	22.0 (71.6)	22.3 (72.1)	23.0 (73.4)	24.1 (75.4)	25.0 (77.0)	25.9 (78.6)	26.0 (78.8)	25.8 (78.4)	25.0 (77.0)	23.4 (74.1)	23.8 (74.8)
Mean daily minimum °C (°F)	20.1 (68.2)	19.8 (67.6)	19.9 (67.8)	20.1 (68.2)	20.8 (69.4)	22.1 (71.8)	22.7 (72.9)	23.9 (75.0)	24.4 (75.9)	24.2 (75.6)	23.0 (73.4)	21.6 (70.9)	21.9 (71.4)
Average rainfall mm (inches)	7 (0.3)	2 (0.1)	1 (0.0)	0 (0)	0 (0)	0 (0)	4 (0.2)	28 (1.1)	86 (3.4)	31 (1.2)	17 (0.7)	15 (0.6)	191 (7.5)

== Transport ==
Since the latest modernization in 2014, the port of Porto Novo has 3 quays, 1 container park, 2 roll-on/roll-off ramps and a boat ramp. The total length of the quays is 268 m, and the maximum depth is 8 m. In 2017 134,141 metric tonnes of cargo and 301,813 passengers were handled (2017). There are 4 daily ferry connections from Porto Novo to Mindelo on São Vicente island. Porto Novo is a member port of the International Association of Ports and Harbors (IAPH).

The national road EN1-SA01 connects Porto Novo with Ribeira Grande, passing through the mountainous interior. The EN1-SA03 leads to Pombas along the east coast. The EN1-SA04 leads west to Ponte Sul. Since the closing of Agostinho Neto Airport, located in Ponta do Sol, there is no functioning airport on the island.

== See also ==
- List of cities in Cape Verde
