= City center of Mindelo =

Mindelo City Center
- Neighborhood
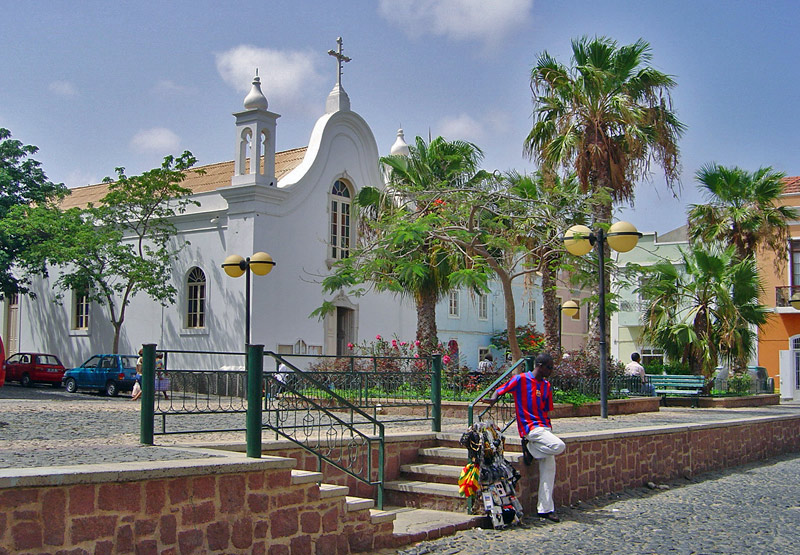
- Nossa Senhora da Luz church
- Interactive map of Mindelo City Center
- Coordinates: 16.887°N 24.988°W
- Country: Cape Verde
- Island: São Vicente Island
- City: Mindelo

Population (2010)
  - Total: 1,553
- Website: www.cmsv.cv

The City center of Mindelo or Morada (Portuguese: Centro do Mindelo) is the historic center of the Mindelo in the island of São Vicente, Cape Verde. Its population was 1,553 at the 2010 census. It is the place where the island's first settlement was founded in 1793. Many public buildings are situated in the city centre. It lies along the Porto Grande Bay. Adjacent neighbourhoods include Fortinho to the northwest, Alto Miramar to the northeast, Fonte Cônego to the east and Ribeira Bote to the southeast.

== Landmarks and points of interest ==
The main streets of the city centre of Mindelo are Avenida Marginal along the waterfront, and the perpendicular Rua Libertadores de África (former Rua Lisboa). The main squares are Praça Estrela in the south of the centre, and Praça Amílcar Cabral in the north. Many colonial buildings from the 19th and early 20th century have been preserved. Sites of interest include:

- Paços do Concelho, built 1860–1873, the city hall of the municipality of São Vicente
- Palácio do Povo (People's Palace), the former Palácio do Governo (Government Palace), built in 1874, expanded in 1928-34
- Our Lady of the Light Cathedral, Catholic church built in 1862, seat of the Roman Catholic Diocese of Mindelo
- Centro Nacional de Artesanato e Design, built as the house of Senator Vera Cruz at the end of the 19th century, now houses exhibitions from Cape Verdean craftsmen
- Torre de Belém, on the waterfront, a 1918-1937 replica of the Belém Tower in Lisbon
- Municipal market, built in 1878
- the former Customs House, now the Cultural Centre of Mindelo, built in 1858-1860
- Liceu Velho (Gil Eanes) (Liceu Velho), built in 1873 as the residence of the Governor

== Gallery ==
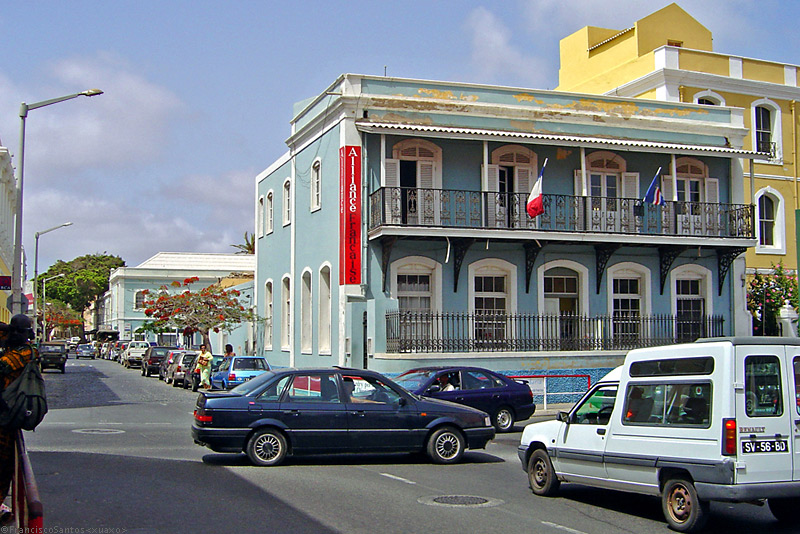
Alliance Française building

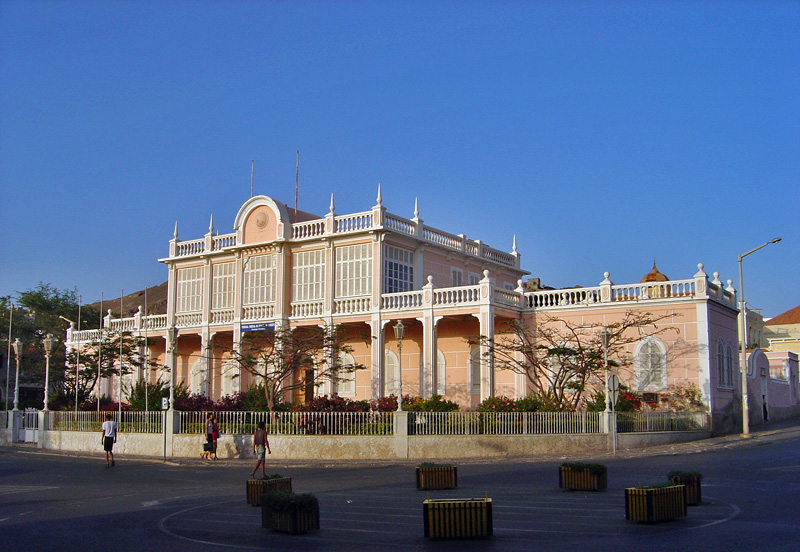
Palácio do Povo

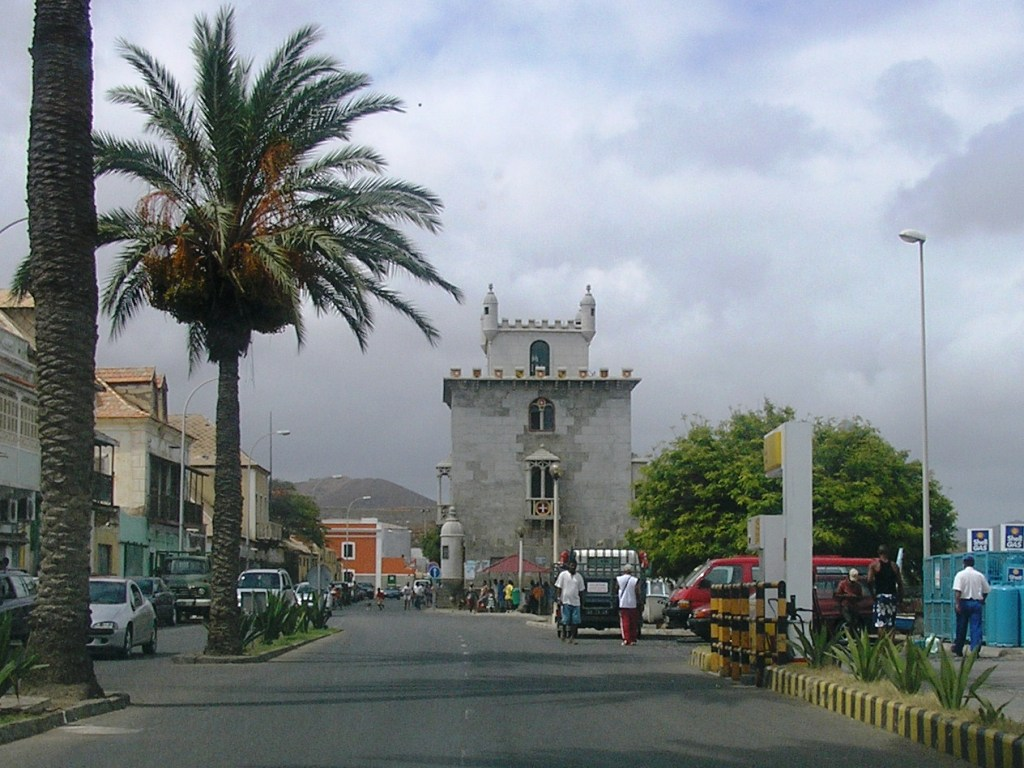
Replica of Lisbon's Torre de Belém west of Avenida Marginal

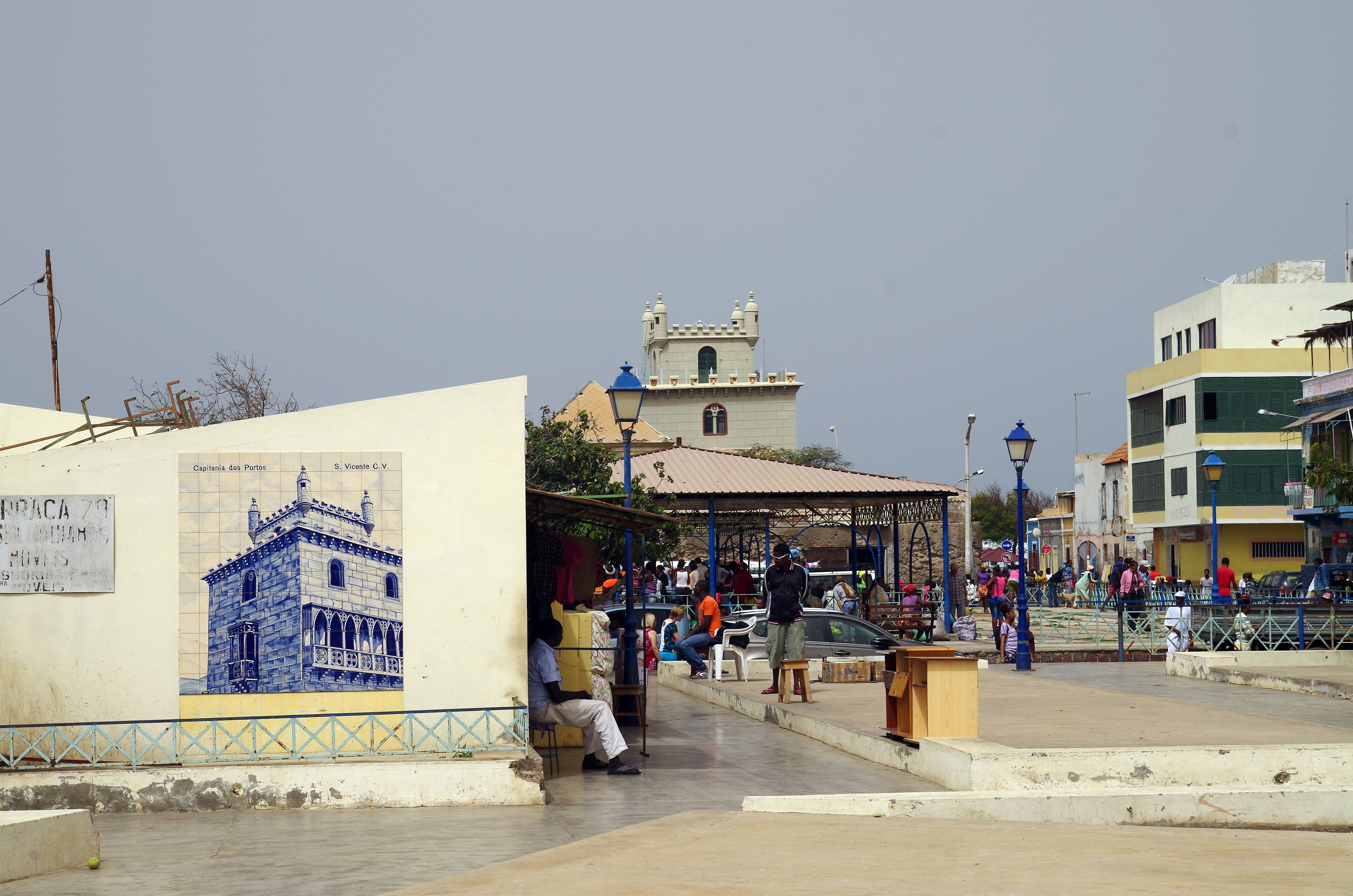
Praça da Estrela with Torre de Belém in the background

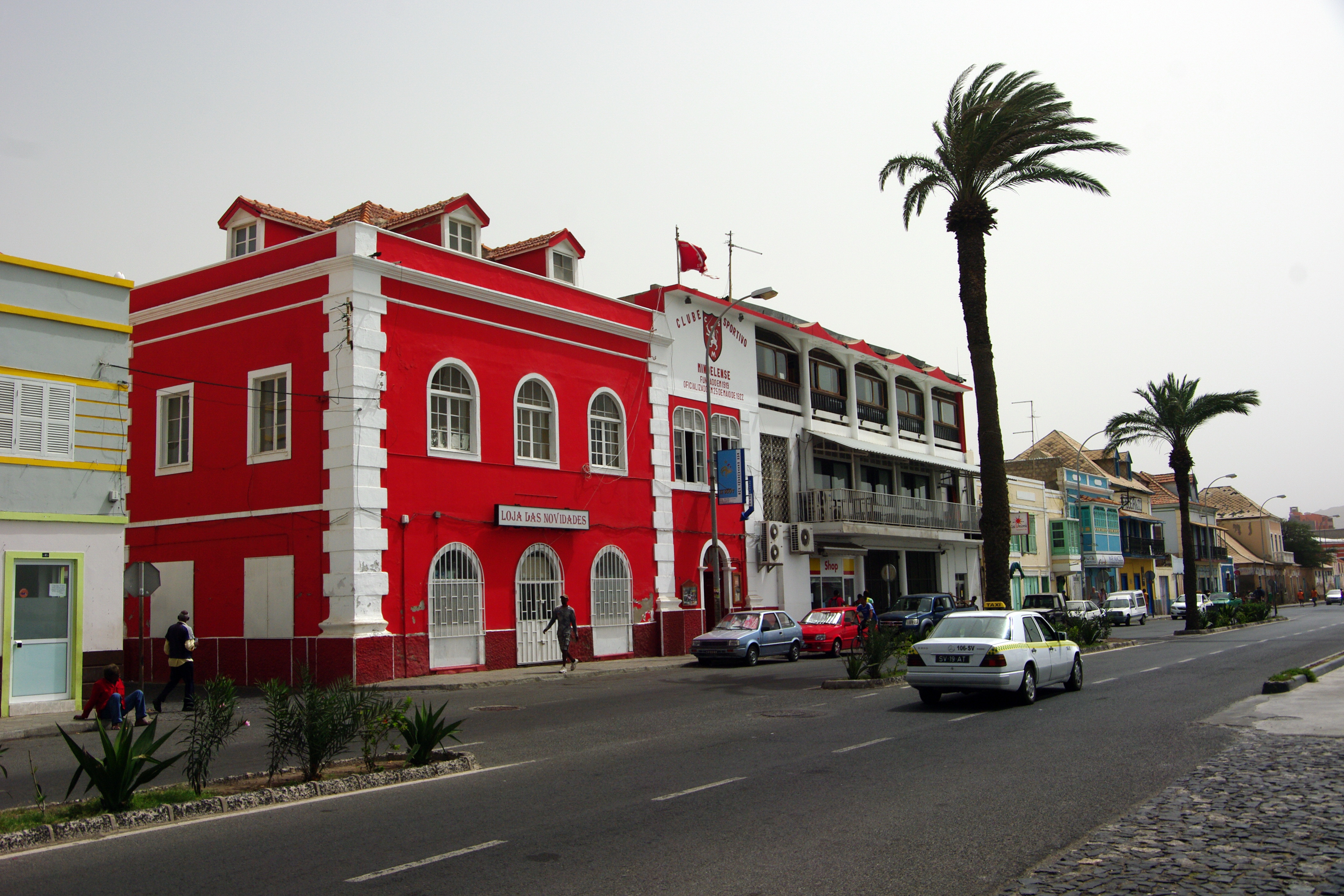
Avenida Marginal with the headquarter of CS Mindelense

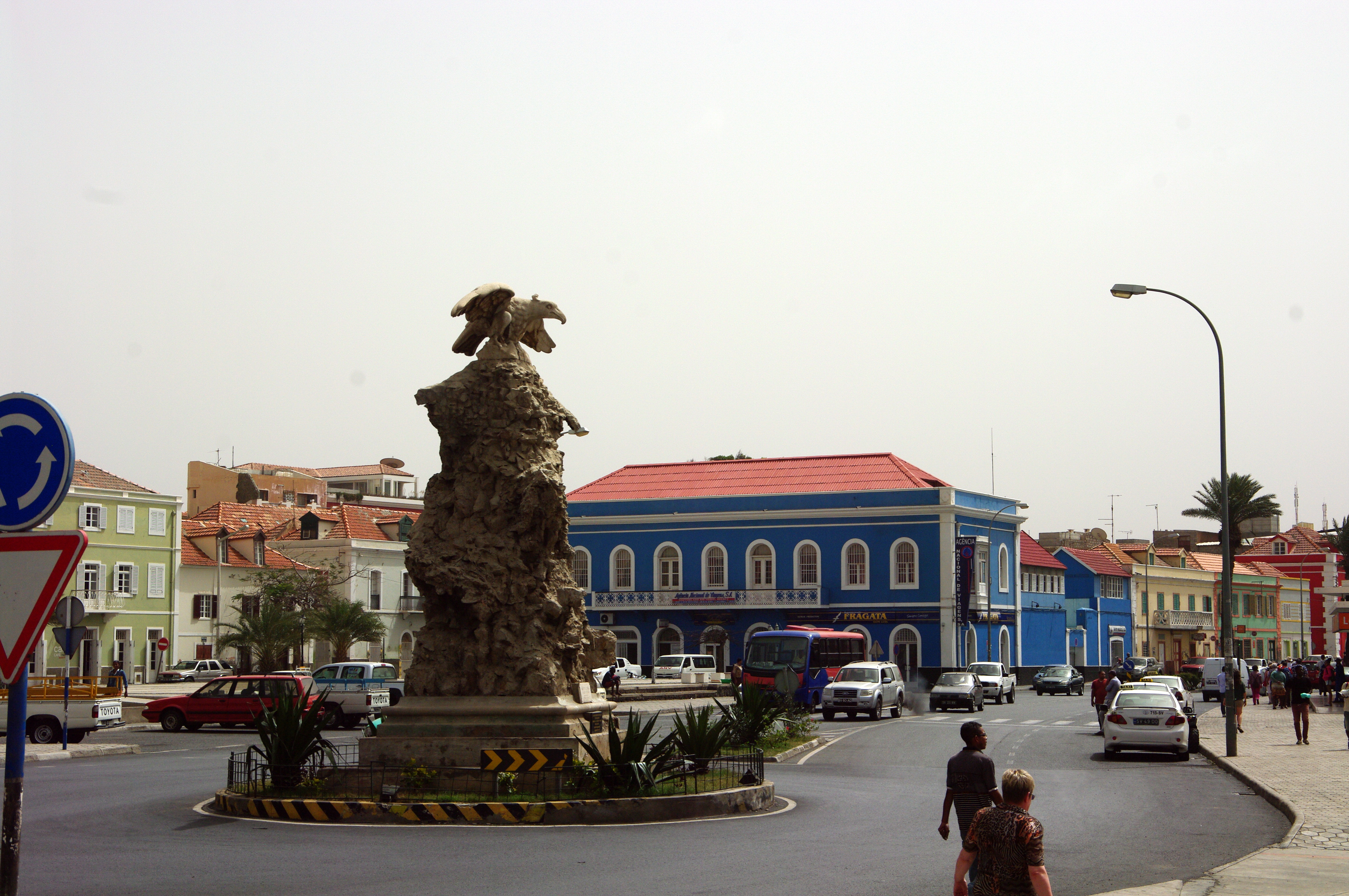

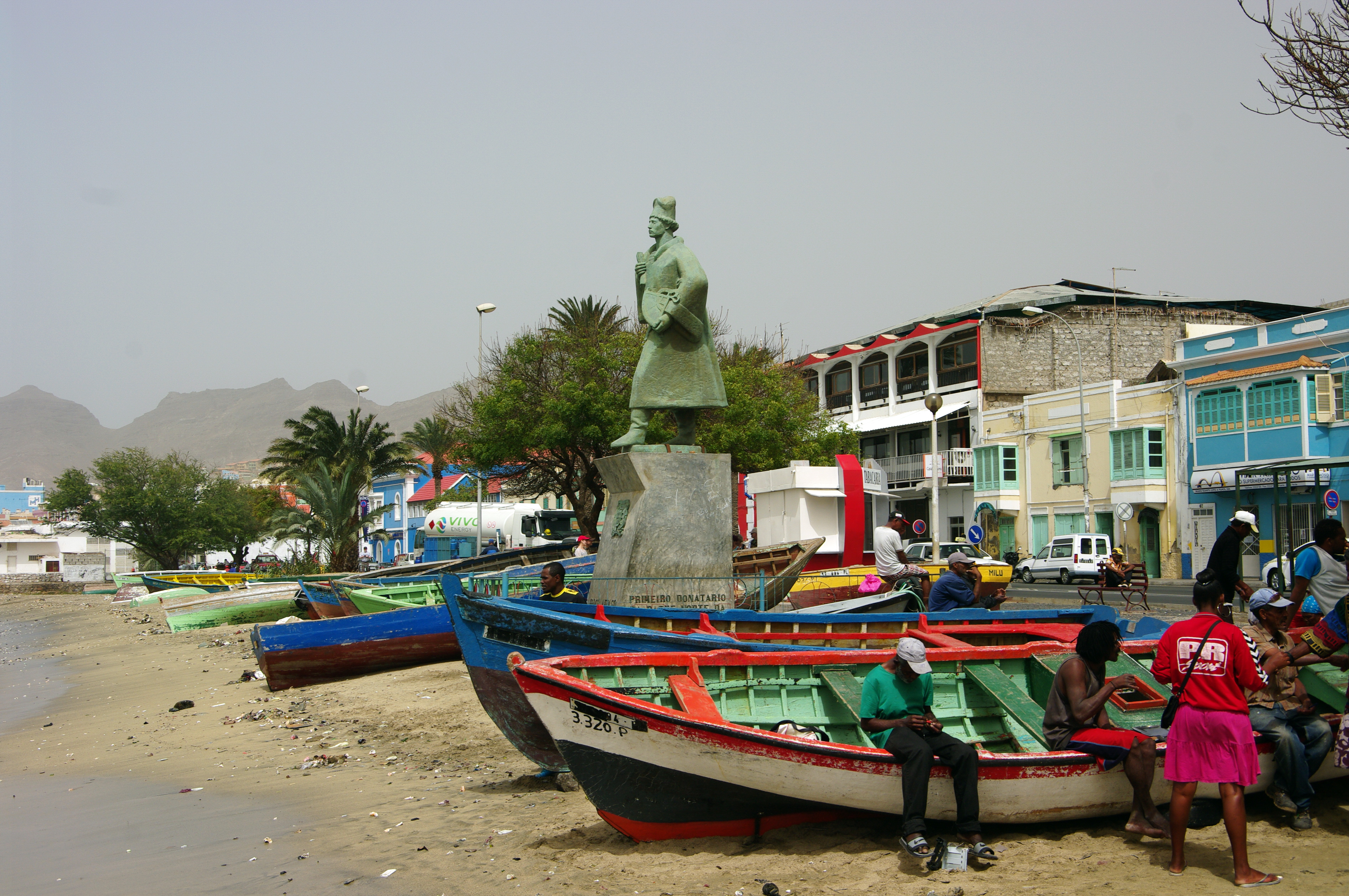
Monument to Diogo Afonso

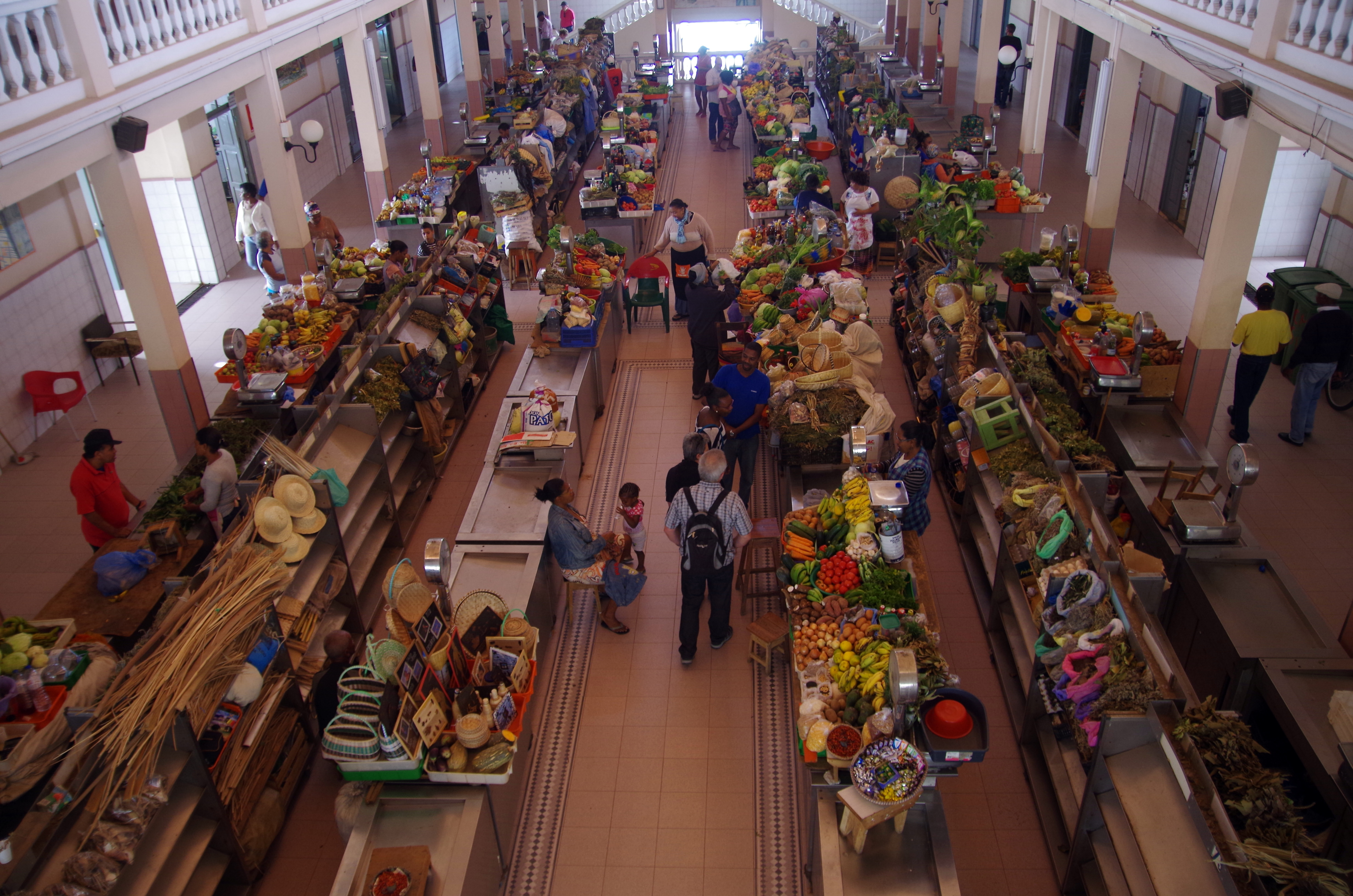
Mindelo's city market
