= Palácio do Governo =

Palácio do Governo is a Portuguese phrase translated literally as Palace of Government or Government Palace. It may refer specifically to the following buildings:

- Palácio do Governo in Dili, Timor-Leste
- Palácio do Governo in Praia, Cape Verde
- Palácio do Povo in Mindelo, Cape Verde; formerly known as the Palácio do Governo
