= Avenida Marginal =

Avenida Marginal may refer to several avenues:

- Avenida Marginal (Mindelo), an avenue in Mindelo, Cape Verde
- the former name of Avenida Combatentes da Liberdade da Patria, in Praia, Cape Verde
- Avenida Marginal, an album by Bana, named after the avenue in Mindelo
