= Fonte Cónego =

- Neighborhood
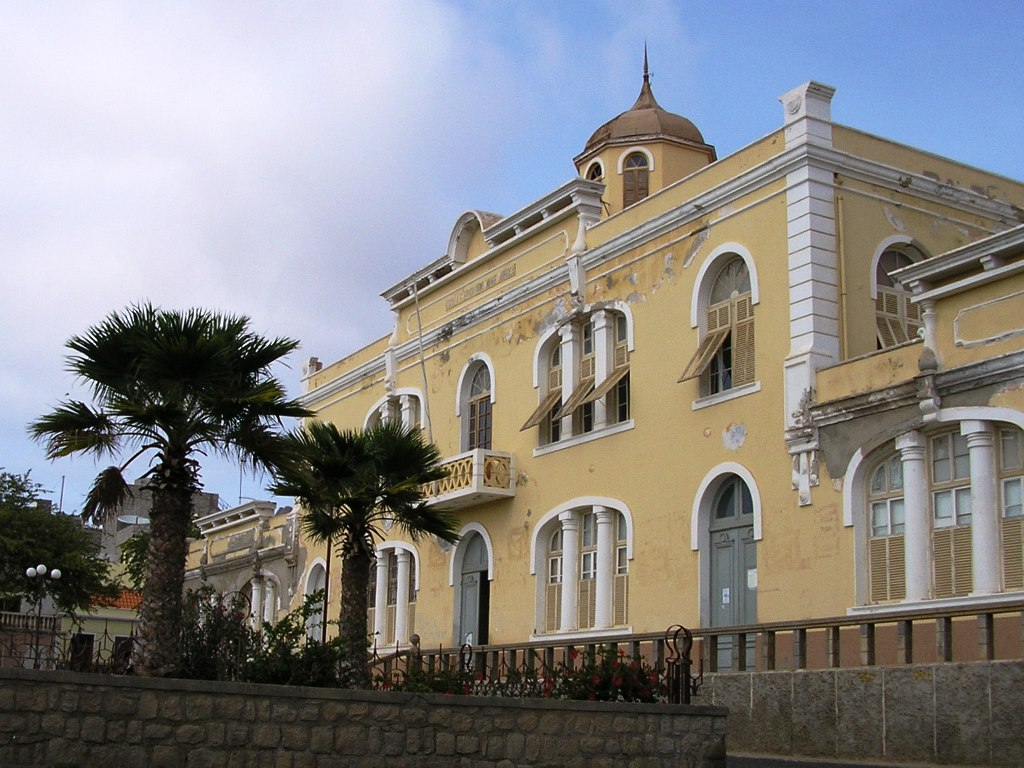
- The Old Lyceum of Jorge Barbosa, a campus of the University of Cape Verde, the main feature of the subdivision
- Interactive map of Fonte Cónego
- Coordinates: 16.886°N 24.985°W
- Country: Cape Verde
- Island: São Vicente Island
- City: Mindelo

Population (2010)
  - Total: 236
- Website: www.cmsv.cv

Fonte Cónego is a subdivision of the city of Mindelo in the island of São Vicente, Cape Verde. Its population was 236 at the 2010 census. It is situated directly east of the city centre. Adjacent neighborhoods include Alto Miramar to the northwest, Alto Santo António to the north, Alto Solarine/Forca to the northeast and Ribeira Bote to the south.
