= Praça Amílcar Cabral =

- Praça Nova
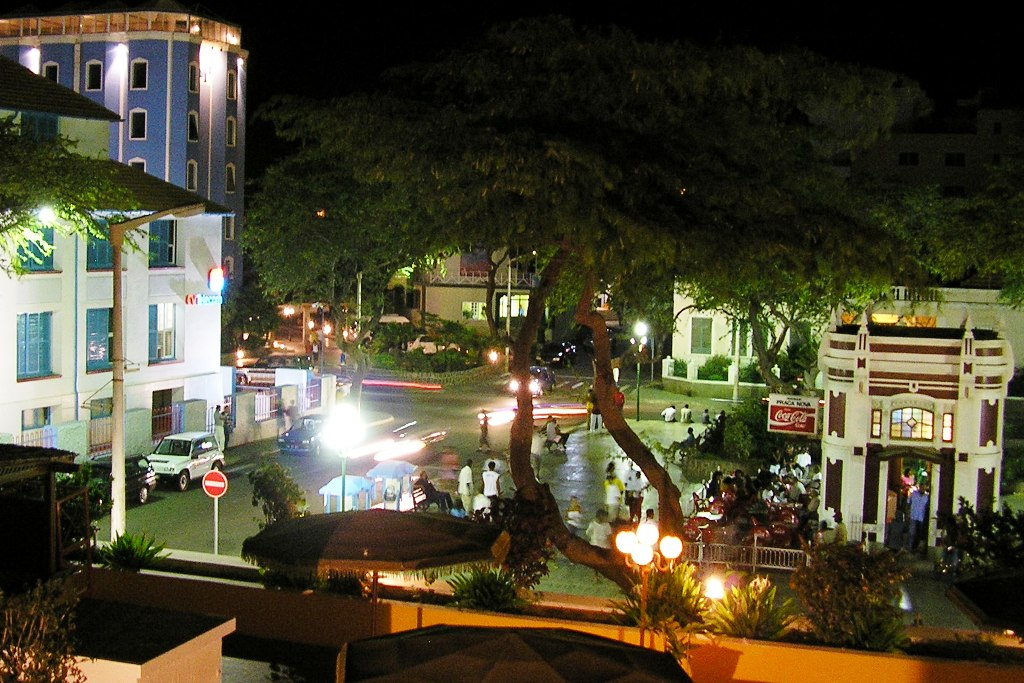

- Location within Cape Verde
- Namesake: Amílcar Cabral
- Location: Mindelo, Cape Verde
- Coordinates: 16.8897°N 24.988°W

Praça Amílcar Cabral, also popularly known as Praça Nova (Portuguese for 'New Square'), is an important square of the city of Mindelo, São Vicente, Cape Verde. It is located in the northern part of the city center of Mindelo. The square is named after Amílcar Cabral, a leader of the independence movement of Cape Verde and Guinea-Bissau. Constructed in 1895, it was named after the colonial administrator Serpa Pinto until Cape Verdean independence in 1975. It was laid out in a new, previously undeveloped part of the town. The square is surrounded by Rua Angola to the north, Rua Argelia to the east, Rua Patrice Lumumba to the south and Rua 5 de Julho to the west.

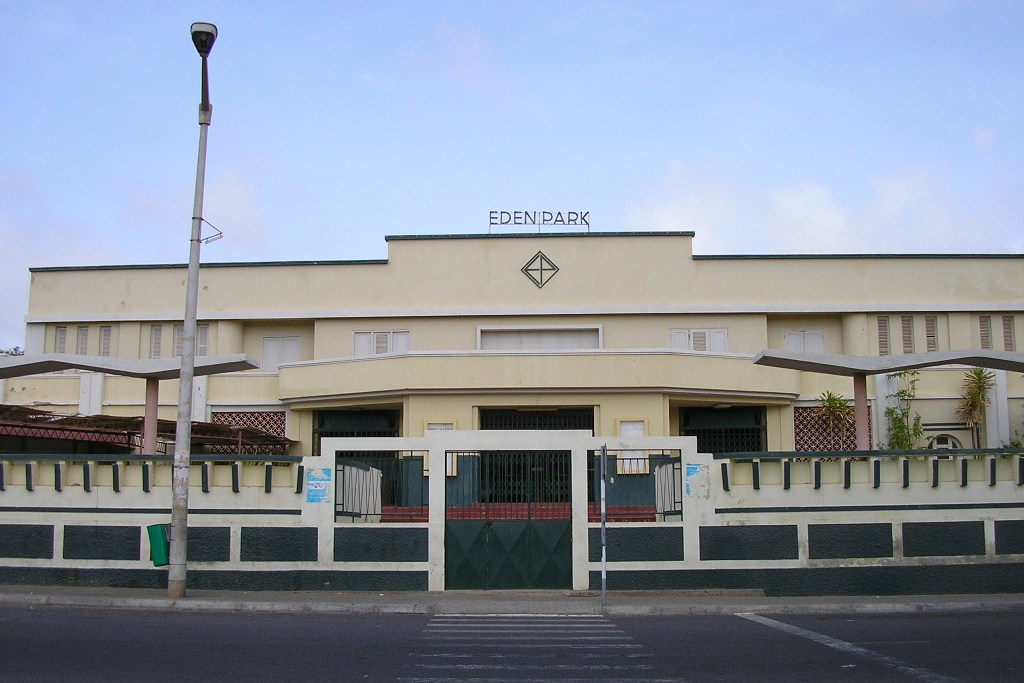
Cinema Éden Park

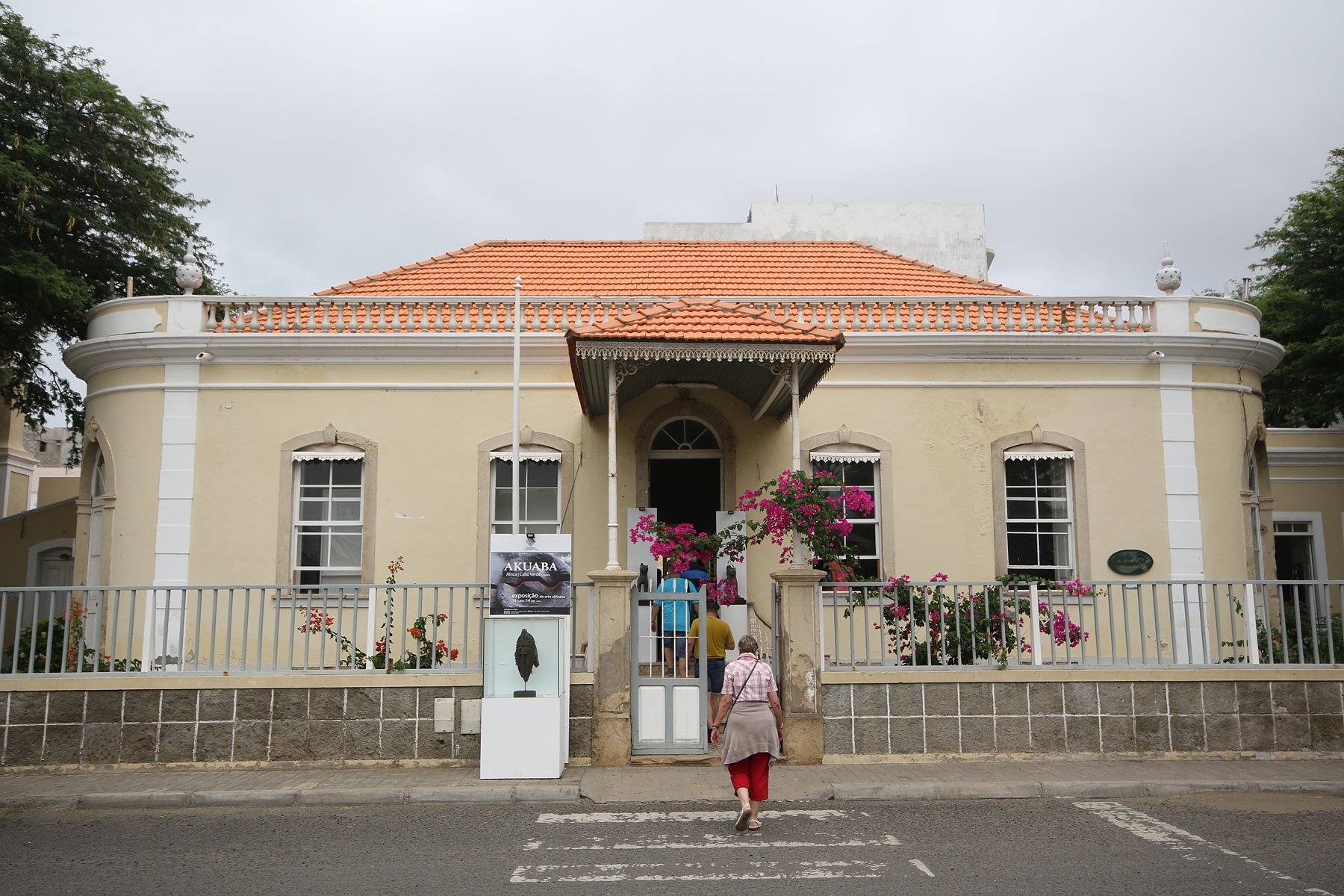
Centro Nacional de Artesanato e Design

Notable buildings and structures around the square:

- Centro Nacional de Artesanato e Design (end of the 19th century)
- Cinema Éden Park (1922)
- the kiosk (1932)
- the New Building (1907–1910), built for the British company that operated the transatlantic telegraph cable, currently houses the telephone company CV Telecom
