= List of buildings and structures in São Vicente, Cape Verde =

This is a list of buildings and structures in the island of São Vicente, Cape Verde.

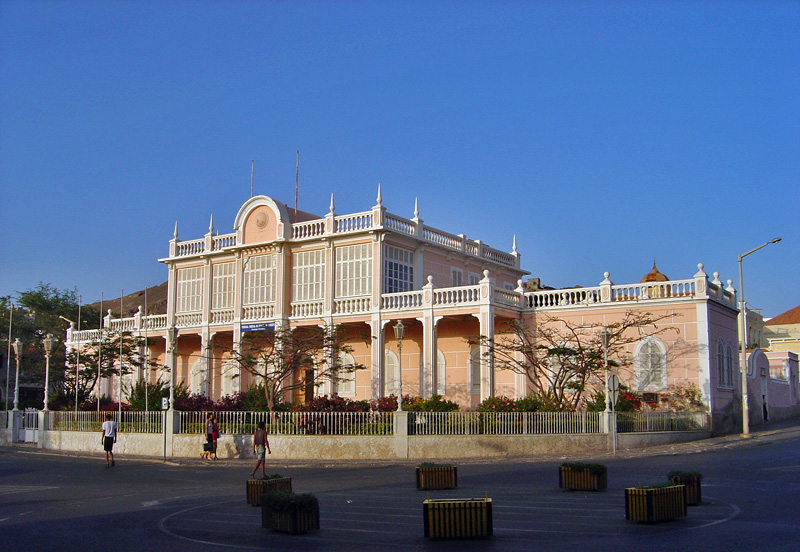
Palácio do Povo

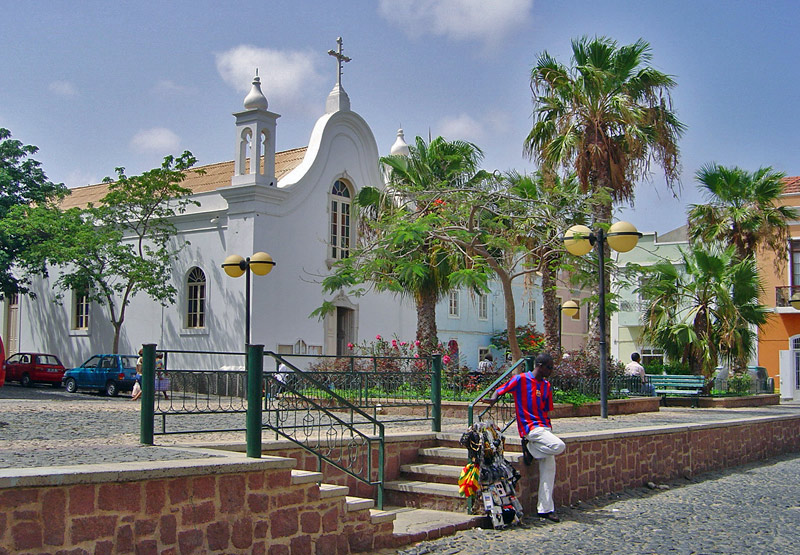
Pro-Cathedral of Our Lady of the Light

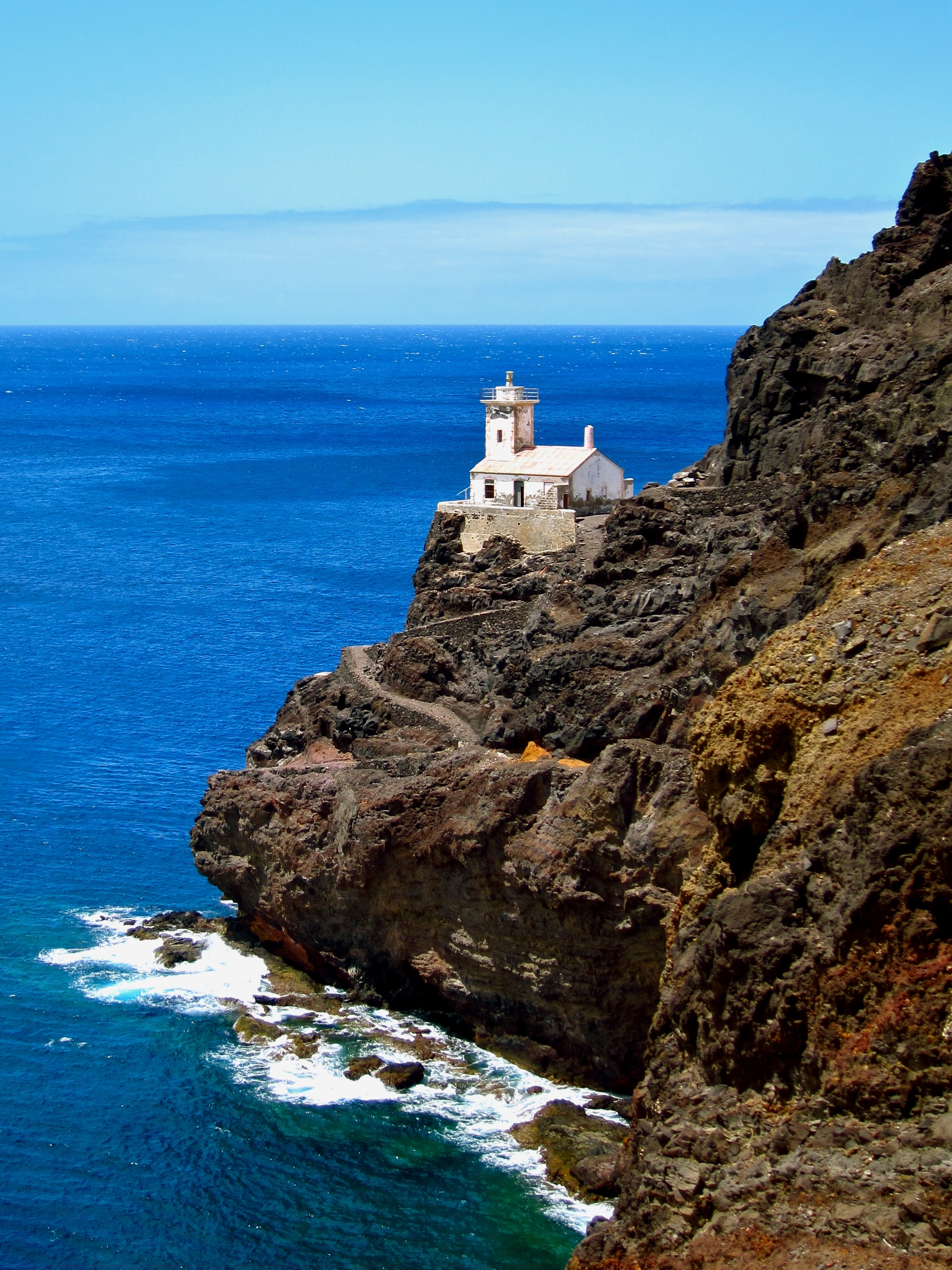
Farol da Ponta Machado

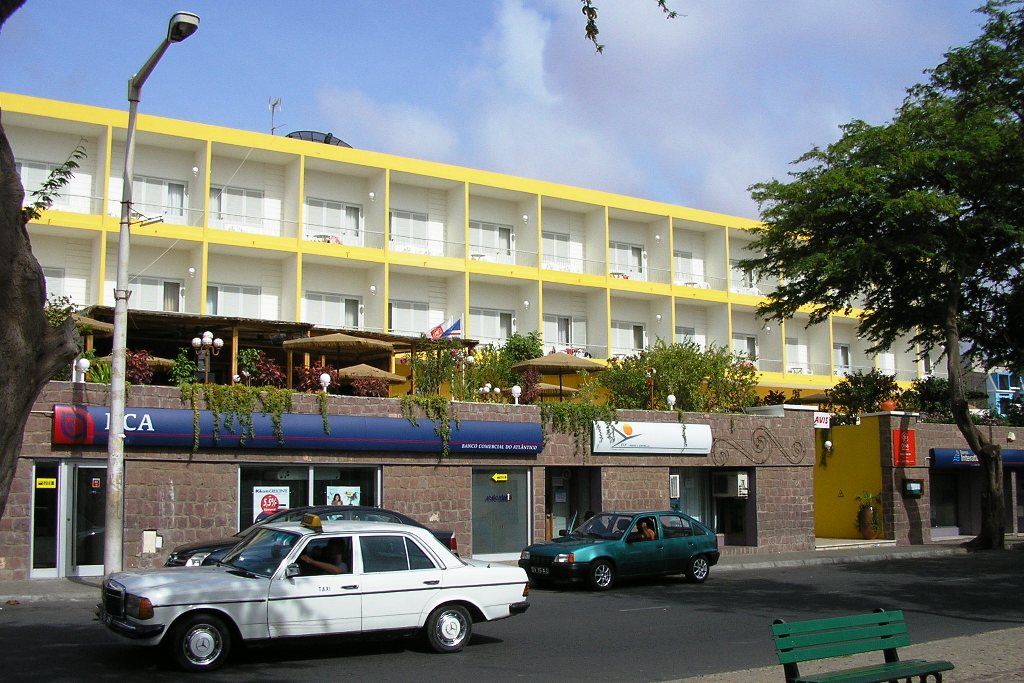
Hotel Porto Grande, San Vicente

== Mindelo ==
- Centro Nacional de Artesanato e Design
- Liceu Velho
- Liceu Ludgero Lima
- Pro-Cathedral of Our Lady of the Light, Mindelo
- Paços do Concelho
- Palácio do Povo
- Fortim d'El-Rei
- Estádio Municipal Adérito Sena

== Elsewhere ==
- Cesária Évora Airport, São Pedro
- Farol de D. Amélia (Ponta Machado)
- Farol de D. Luis (Ilhéu dos Passaros)

== See also ==
- List of buildings and structures in Cape Verde
