= Ribeira Bote =

- Neighborhood
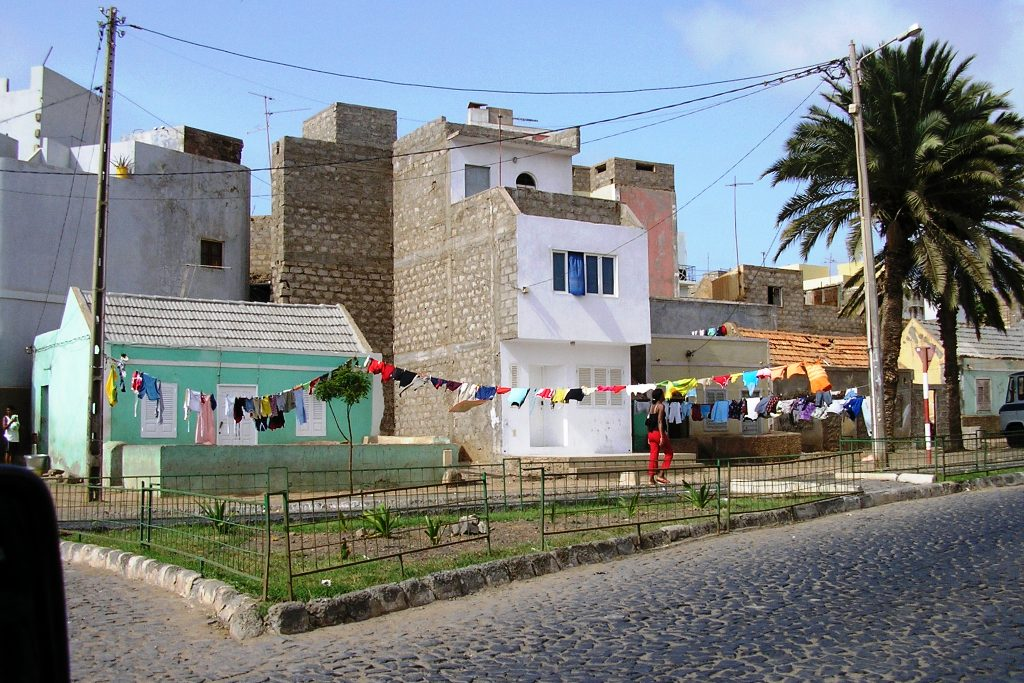
- Ribeira Bote
- Interactive map of Ribeira Bote
- Coordinates: 16.884°N 24.984°W
- Country: Cape Verde
- Island: São Vicente Island
- City: Mindelo

Population (2010)
  - Total: 3,956
- Website: www.cmsv.cv

Ribeira Bote is a subdivision of the city of Mindelo in the island of São Vicente, Cape Verde. Its population was 3,956 at the 2010 census. It borders the city centre to the northwest and Fonte Cónego to the north. The Hospital Velho and the church Nossa Senhora Auxiliadora are located in Ribeira Bote.

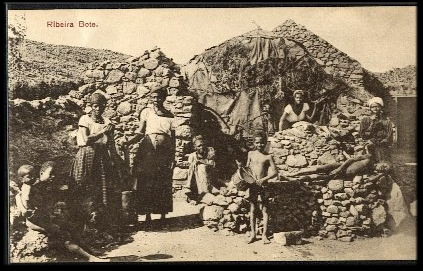
Old postcard of a hut in Ribeira Bote
