= Chã de Alecrim =

- Neighbourhood
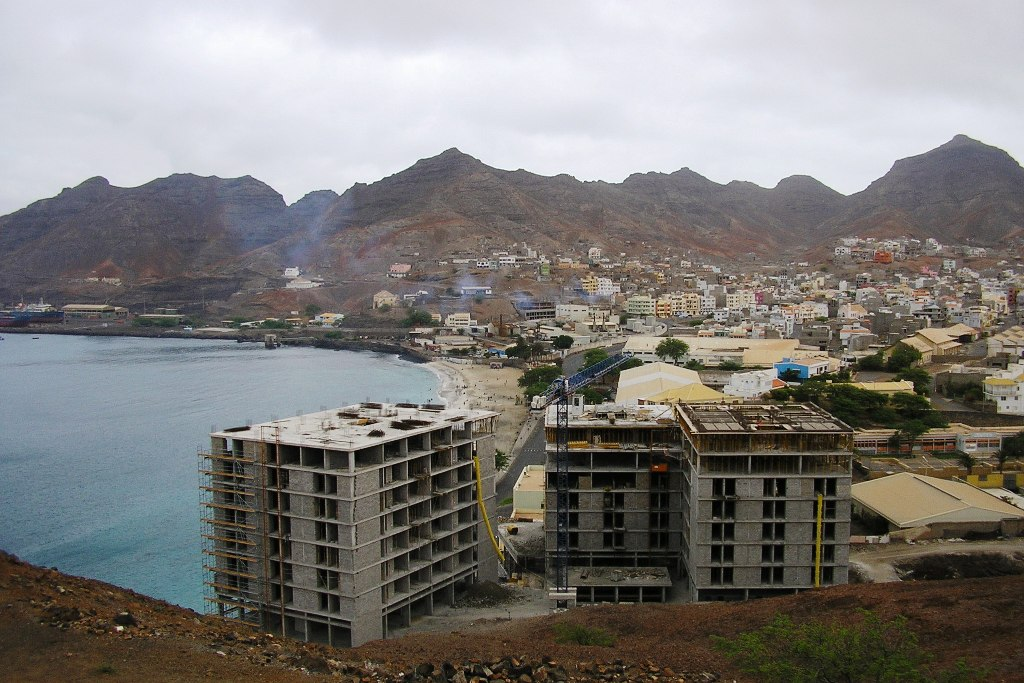
- Chã de Alecrim as seen from Fortinho hill
- Interactive map of Chã de Alecrim
- Coordinates: 16.899°N 24.988°W
- Country: Cape Verde
- Island: São Vicente Island
- City: Mindelo

Population (2010)
  - Total: 5,126
- Website: www.cmsv.cv

Chã de Alecrim is a subdivision of the city of Mindelo in the island of São Vicente, Cape Verde. Its population was 5,126 at the 2010 census. It is situated 1.5 km north of the city centre. Bordering subdivisions include Matiota/Laginha to the southwest and Fonte Meio/Madeiralzinho to the southeast.
