= Pro-Cathedral of Our Lady of the Light, Mindelo =

Pro-Cathedral of Our Lady of the Light
- Pró-catedral Nossa Senhora da Luz
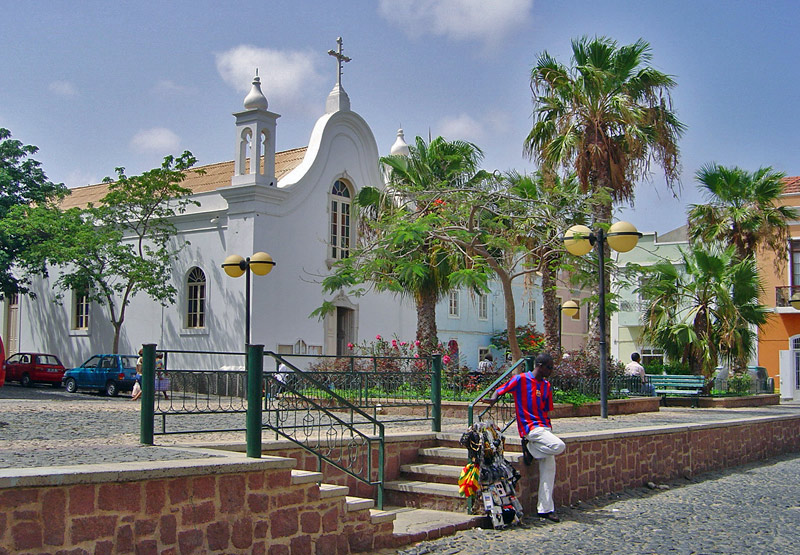
- Pro-Cathedral of Our Lady of the Light
- 16.8855°N 24.9881°W
- Location: Rua da Luz, Mindelo
- Country: Cape Verde
- Denomination: Roman Catholic Church

Architecture
- Completed: 1862

The Pro-Cathedral of Our Lady of the Light (Portuguese: Pró-catedral Nossa Senhora da Luz) is a Roman Catholic church in the city of Mindelo, on the island of São Vicente, Cape Verde. It is located on Rua da Luz, in the city centre. Built in 1862, it is one of the oldest buildings of Mindelo. However, the church has been enlarged recently, leaving only the façade in its original state. It is the seat of the Roman Catholic Diocese of Mindelo, created in 2003.

== See also ==
- Roman Catholicism in Cape Verde
- Pro-cathedral
- List of buildings and structures in São Vicente, Cape Verde
- List of churches in Cape Verde

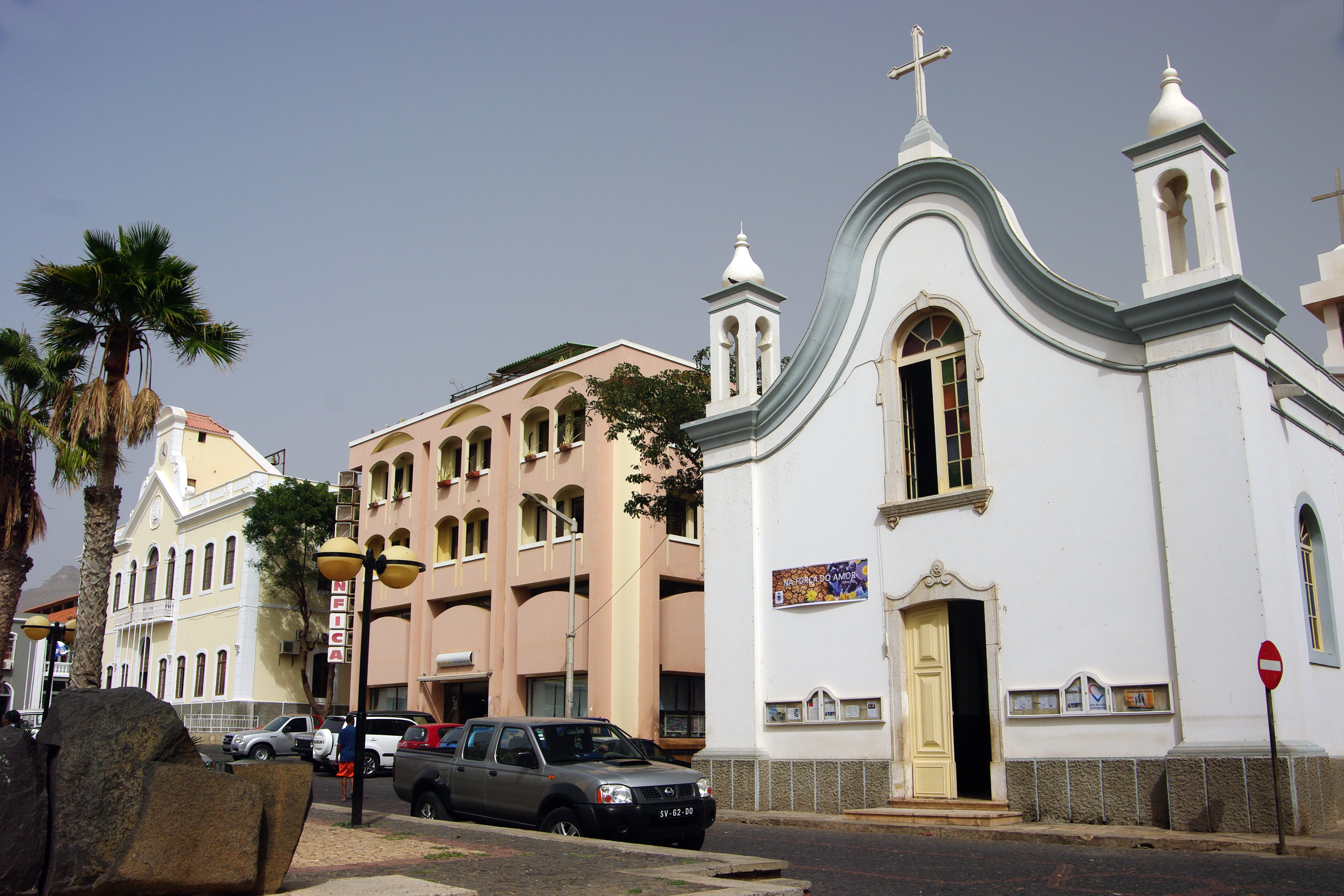
Another view of the church
