= Fortinho =

- Neighborhood
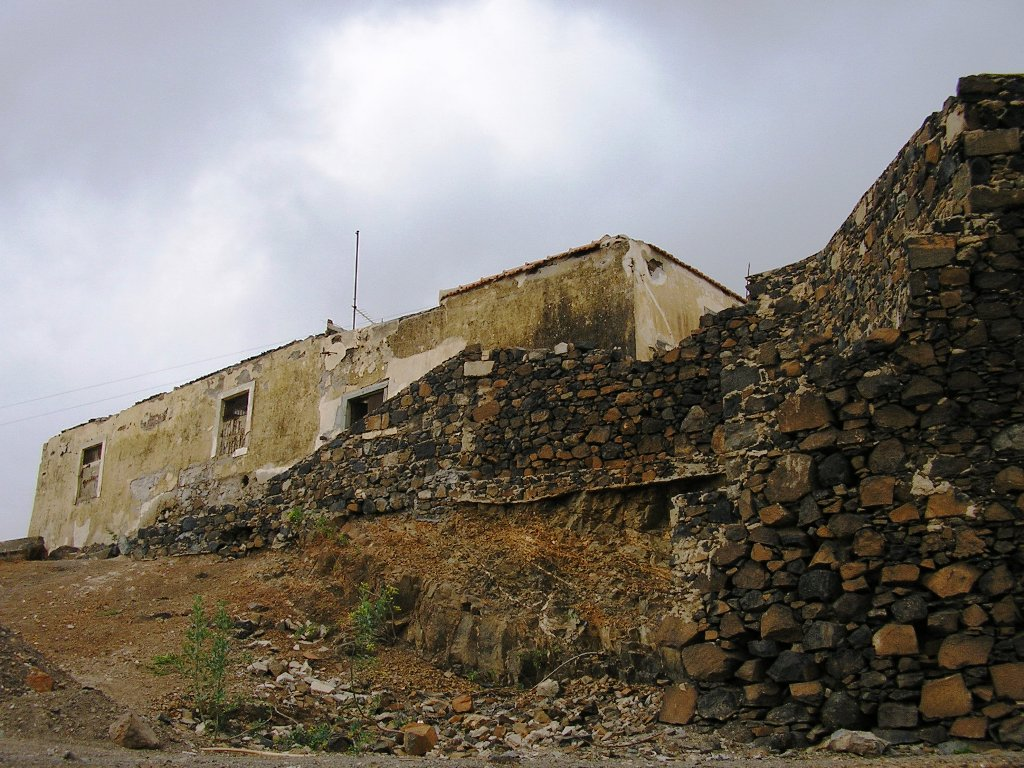
- Fortim d'El-Rei
- Interactive map of Fortinho
- Coordinates: 16.892°N 24.991°W
- Country: Cape Verde
- Island: São Vicente Island
- City: Mindelo

Population (2010)
  - Total: 92
- Website: www.cmsv.cv

Fortinho or Fortinho/Escola Técnica is a subdivision of the city of Mindelo in the island of São Vicente, Cape Verde. Its population was 92 at the 2010 census. It is situated northwest of the city centre and south of Matiota. It takes its name from the fortress Fortim d'El-Rei.
