= Avenida Marginal (Mindelo) =

Street in Mindelo, Cape Verde

Coordinates: 16.8874°N 24.9891°W

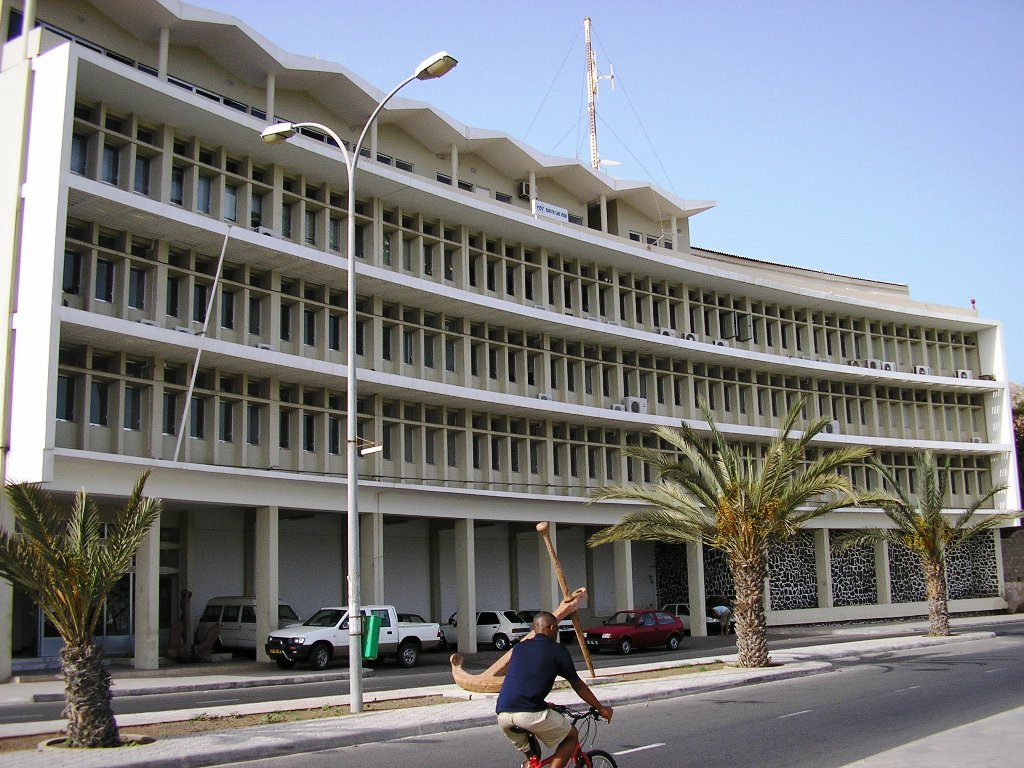
- A four storey building on Avenida Marginal
- Interactive map of Avenida Marginal
- Location: Mindelo, São Vicente, Cape Verde
- south end: Rua da Praia
- north end: Lajinha roundabout

Avenida Marginal is an important street in Mindelo, São Vicente island, Cape Verde. It runs along the coast of the Porto Grande Bay, connecting the city centre with the northwestern outskirts (Matiota). Its southern end is the intersection with Rua Libertadores de África (the former Rua Lisboa) and Rua da Praia, that continues south along the coast. Avenida Marginal runs along the port of Mindelo, below Fortim d'El-Rei and along Praia da Laginha in Matiota.

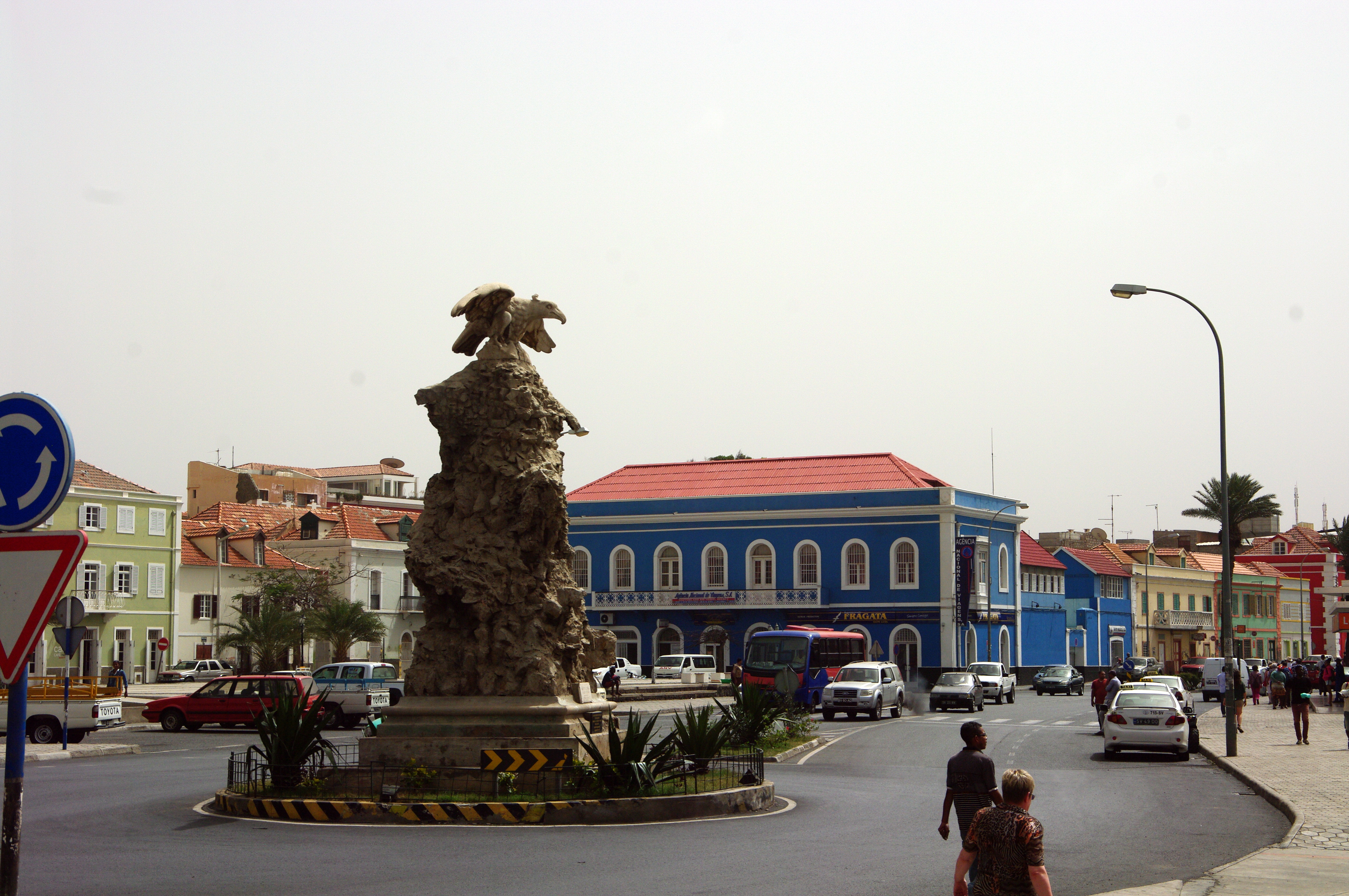
The square at the southern end of Avenida Marginal, the Cory Brothers building in the back

Notable structures along the avenue:

- the former customs house (1858-1861), current Centro Cultural do Mindelo
- Parque Nhô Roque, named after writer António Aurélio Gonçalves
- the former British consulate (1853)

Avenida Marginal lent its name to an album of singer Bana and a song of singer Cesária Évora in her 2006 album Rogamar.
