= Dani Pinto =

Macau footballer and manager

Personal information
- Full name: Daniel Augusto Macedo de Melo e Pinto
- Date of birth: 10 May 1958 (age 68)
- Place of birth: Mindelo, Cape Verde
- Position: Defender

Senior career*
| Years | Team | Apps | (Gls) |
| 1980–1982 | Académica de Coimbra | 12 | (0) |
| 1982–1983 | C.F. União de Coimbra | 9 | (0) |
| 1990 | Leng Ngan | | |
| 1993–1994 | G.D. Negro Rubro | | |
| 2002 | G.D. Lam Pak | | |
| 2007 | Kuan Tai | | |
| 2008–2009 | F.C. Porto de Macau | | |

International career
- Macau

Managerial career
- 2010–2012: F.C. Porto de Macau
- 2013: Macau (assistant)
- 2014–2017: S.L. Benfica de Macau
- * Club domestic league appearances and goals

Daniel Augusto Macedo de Melo e Pinto (born 10 May 1958), better known as Dani Pinto, is a football manager who coaches SL Benfica de Macau and a retired footballer who played as a defender. Born in Cape Verde prior to it becoming independent from Portugal, he has moved first to the metropole, where he played for Académica de Coimbra, and C.F. União de Coimbra. In early 1990s, he moved to Macau, which was Portuguese as well (now a special administrative region of China). Being there, he has played for Leng Ngan, G.D. Negro Rubro, G.D. Lam Pak, Kuan Tai, F.C. Porto de Macau and for the senior Macau national team.

Since 2010 until 2012 he coached the F.C. Porto de Macau.
