= Paços do Concelho =

Coordinates: 16.8860°N 24.9880°W

The Paços do Concelho is a public building in the city centre of Mindelo, São Vicente, Cape Verde. Built between 1860 and 1873, it houses the administration of the municipality of São Vicente.

== See also ==
- List of buildings and structures in São Vicente, Cape Verde
