= Matiota =

Matiota Laginha
- Neighbourhood
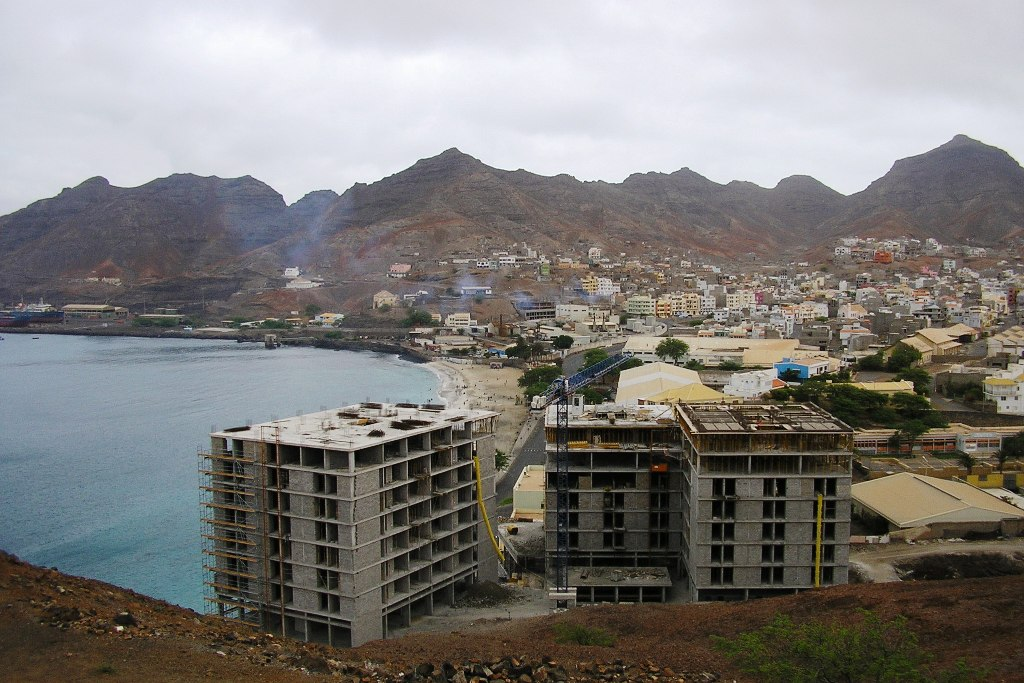
- Praia da Laginha

- Location within Cape Verde
- Coordinates: 16°53′43″N 24°59′31″W
- Country: Cape Verde
- Island: São Vicente Island
- City: Mindelo

Matiota is a subdivision of the city of Mindelo in the island of São Vicente, Cape Verde. It is situated 1.2 km northwest of the city centre, along Porto Grande Bay. Adjacent subdivisions include Chã de Alecrim to the east and Fortinho to the south. It includes the beach Praia da Laginha.

== In popular culture ==
O mar na Lajinha, a 2004 novel by Germano Almeida is set on the beach of Laginha.
