= Fortim d'El-Rei =

Building in Cape Verde

- Mindelo, São Vicente Island in Cape Verde
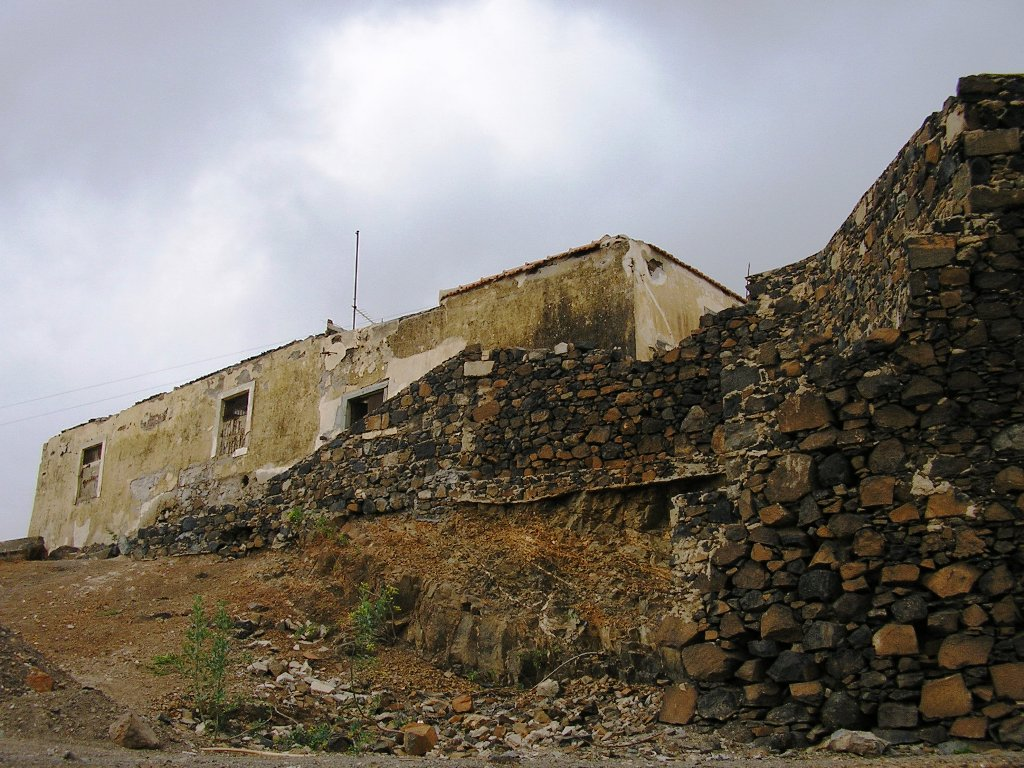
- Fortim d'El-Rei in 2007

Site information
- Controlled by: Portuguese Empire (1852-1975)

Location
- Location within Cape Verde
- Coordinates: 16.8907°N 24.9931°W

Site history
- Built: 1852
- In use: 1852-1930

Airfield information
- Identifiers

Fortim d'El Rei is a fort in Mindelo, in the island of São Vicente, Cape Verde. It is located on a hill north of the city centre, in the neighbourhood Fortinho. It was built in 1852 for the defence of Porto Grande Bay and the city of Mindelo. Since 1930, it was only used for civil purposes, and it gradually fell into disrepair.

== See also ==
- List of buildings and structures in São Vicente, Cape Verde
