= Rua Libertadores de África =

Coordinates: 16.8867°N 24.9882°W

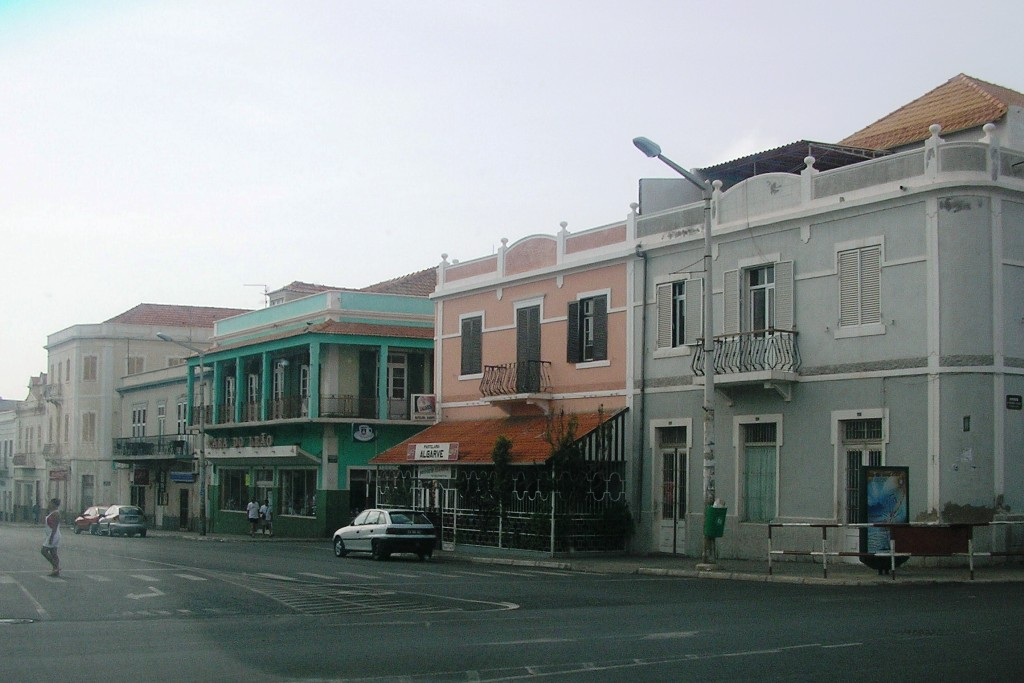
Rua Libertadores de África

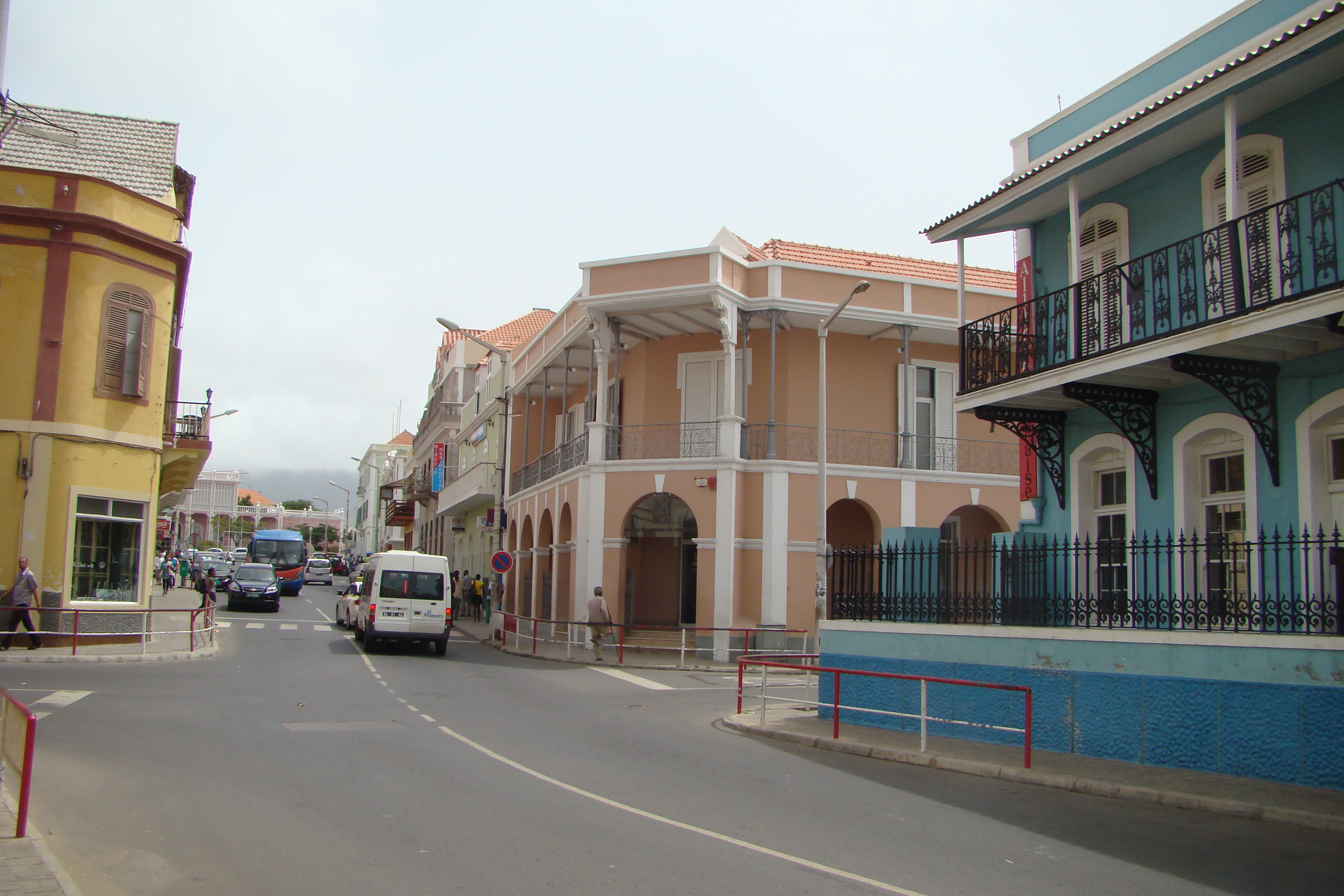
Intersection of Rua Libertadores de África with Avenida 5 de Julho, Palácio de Povo at the end

Rua Libertadores de África (Portuguese for "street of the Liberators of Africa") is one of the main streets in the city centre of Mindelo, Cape Verde, formerly called Rua Lisboa ("Lisbon street"). It runs from the seaside Avenida Marginal to the Palácio do Povo (the former Government Palace).

Notable buildings along the street:

- Palácio do Povo, built in 1874, expanded in 1928-34
- Municipal market, built in 1878
- French consulate and Alliance Française, built in 1858
- the former Customs House, now the Cultural Centre of Mindelo, built 1858-1860
