= Centro Nacional de Artesanato e Design =

Cultural centre in Mindelo, São Vicente, Cape Verde

Centro Nacional de Arte, Artesanato e Design
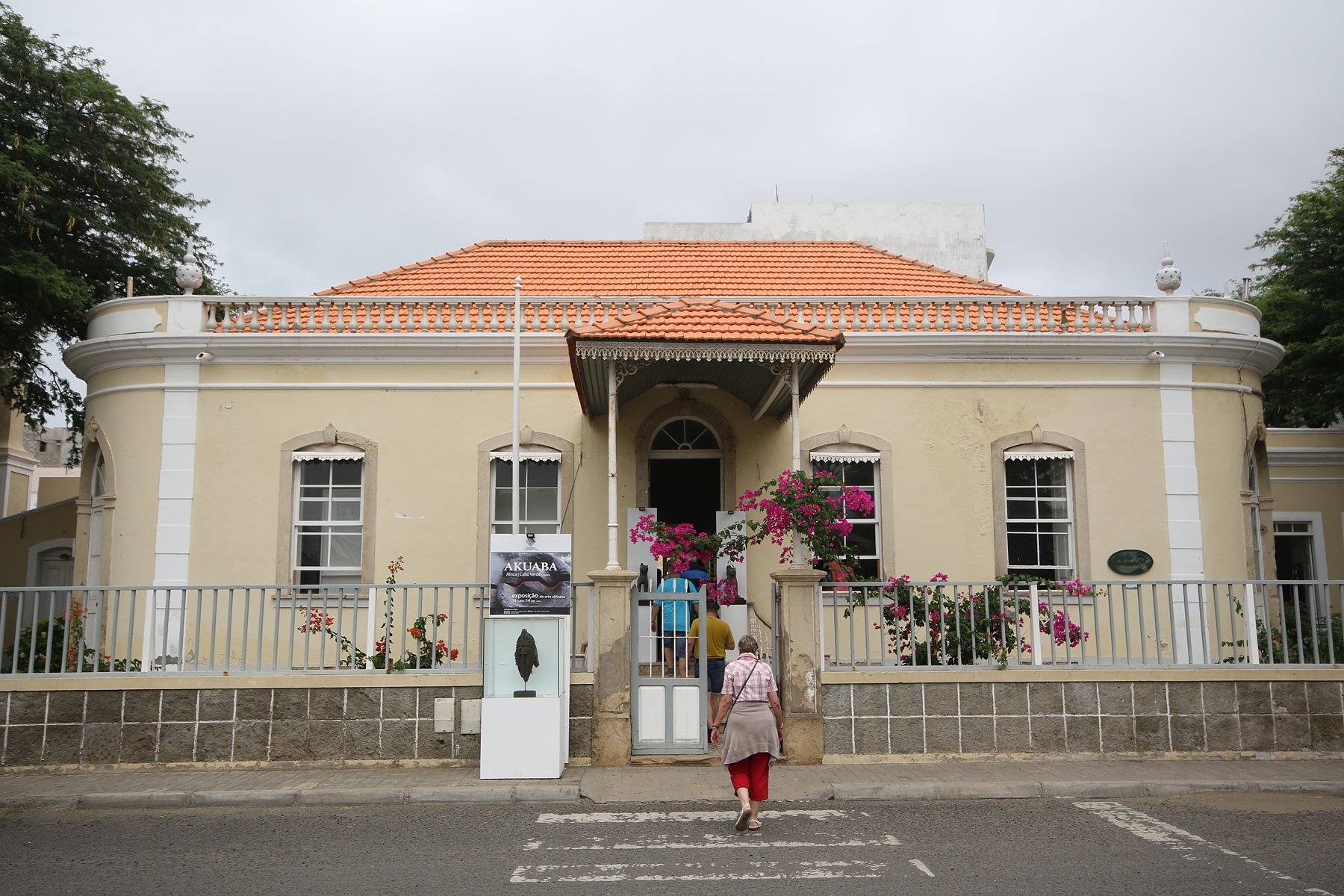
- Front of the museum
- Location: Praça Nova, Mindelo, Cape Verde
- Coordinates: 16.8903°N 24.9878°W
- Collections: local culture, crafts, design

Centro Nacional de Arte, Artesanato e Design (CNAD) (English: "National Centre for Art, Crafts and Design") is a cultural centre in the city of Mindelo, on the island of São Vicente, in Cape Verde. It is the first cultural institution built from scratch in the country, prepared to host temporary and permanent exhibitions, develop creative residencies and also serve as the basis for a documentary and artistic archive of Cape Verdean traditional and contemporary art production. CNAD is situated at the north end of Praça Nova, in the city centre of Mindelo.

== History ==
The museum is housed in a colonial building that was originally built for Senator Vera Cruz at the end of the 19th century. Between 1917 and 1921, it housed the Liceu Nacional. In 1950, Rádio Barlavento was installed in the building. After the radio station moved in 1979, the building was transformed into the current museum. Renovation of the current museum building and construction of a new museum building by the local architectural firm Ramos Castellano Arquitectos, attached to it have been announced for 2018.

== See also ==
- List of buildings and structures in São Vicente, Cape Verde
