= Palácio do Povo =

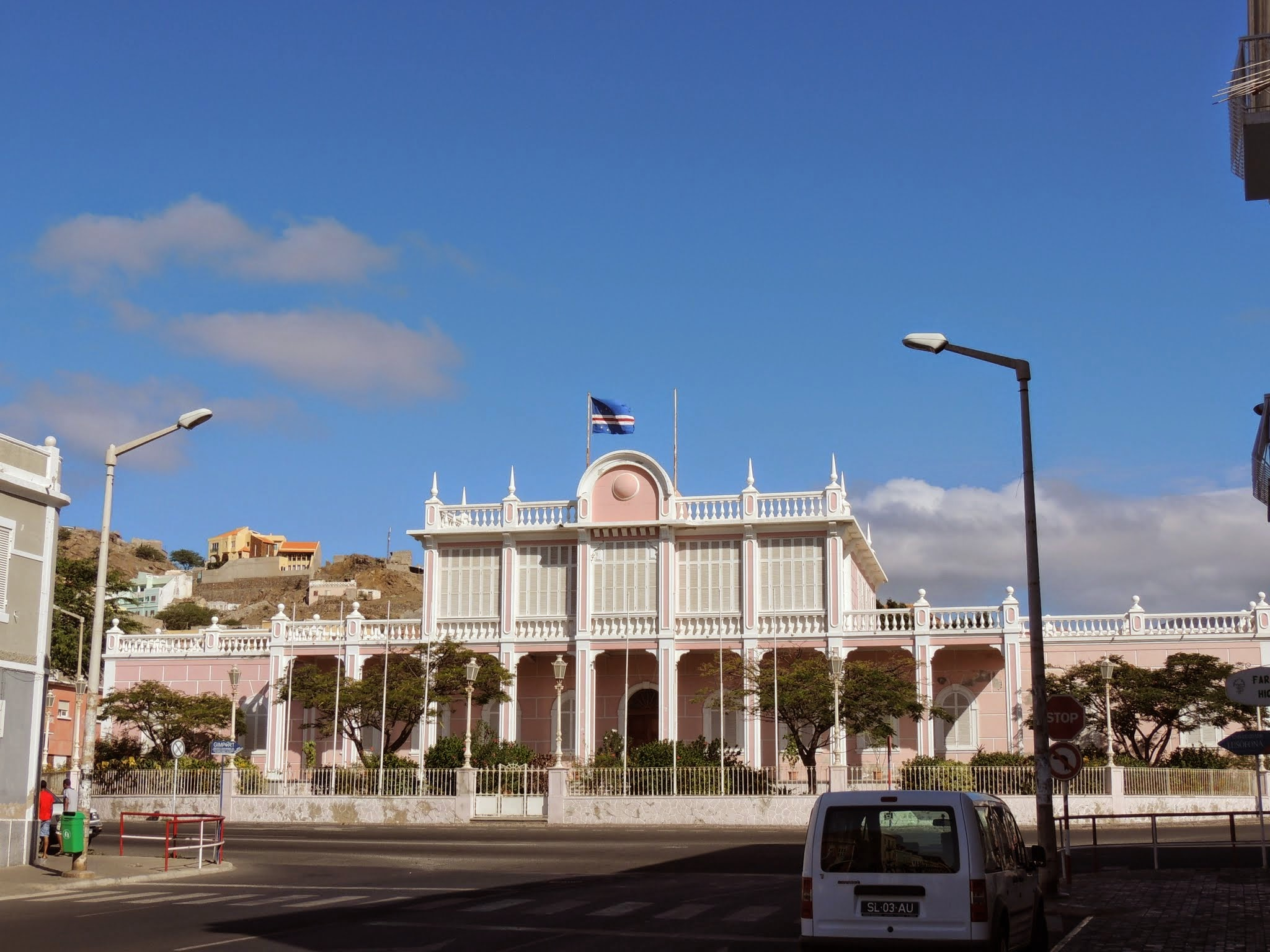
- Interactive map of the Palácio do Povo area

General information
- Architectural style: Neoclassical
- Location: Rua Baltasar Lopes da Silva; Rua Franz Fanon, Mindelo, Cape Verde
- Coordinates: 16°53′11.3″N 24°59′12.8″W
- Construction started: 1858
- Completed: 1934

Technical details
- Floor count: 2

The Palácio do Povo (People's Palace), formerly the Palácio do Governo (Government Palace), is a public building in the city centre of Mindelo in Cape Verde. It is situated at the eastern end of Rua Libertadores de África (formerly Rua Lisboa). It was built in 1874, when there were plans to move the capital of Cape Verde to Mindelo. Originally with only one floor, it was expanded with a second floor between 1928 and 1934. Since independence (1975), it is called Palácio do Povo. It currently houses a Carnival museum.

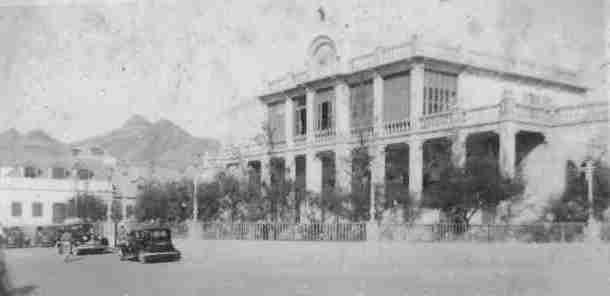
Palácio do Governo in 1942

== See also ==
- List of buildings and structures in São Vicente, Cape Verde
