= Alto Miramar =

- Neighbourhood
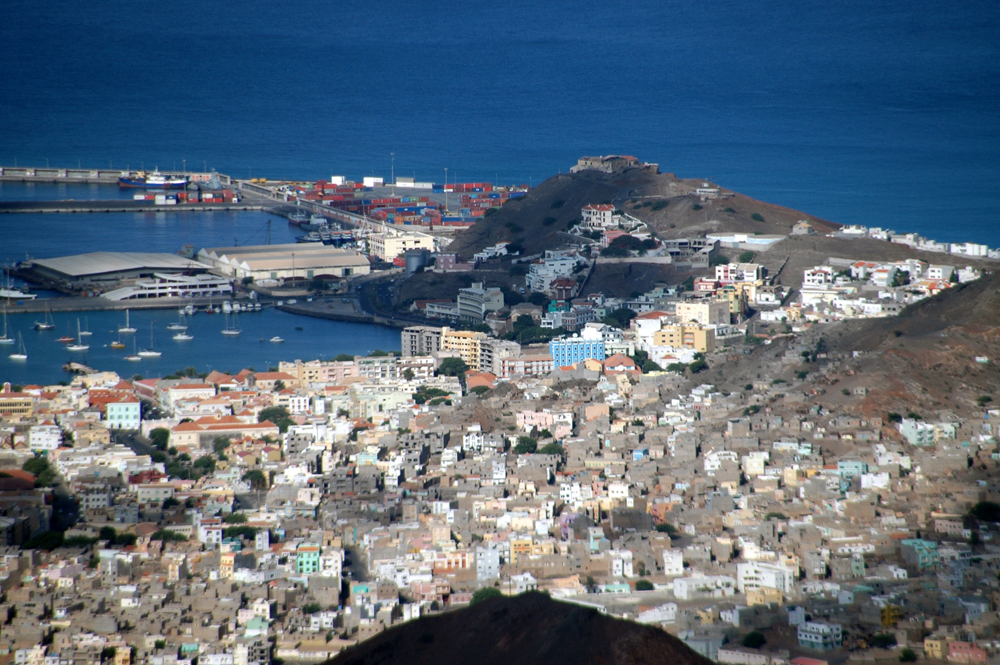
- Interactive map of Alto Miramar
- Coordinates: 16.8876°N 24.9859°W
- Country: Cape Verde
- Island: São Vicente Island
- City: Mindelo

Population (2010)
  - Total: 524
- Website: www.cmsv.cv

Alto Miramar is a subdivision of the city of Mindelo in the island of São Vicente, Cape Verde. Its population was 524 at the 2010 census. It is situated directly northeast of the city centre. The main streets of the neighbourhood are Rua Unidade Africana and Rua da Paz.
