= Mindelo =

- City
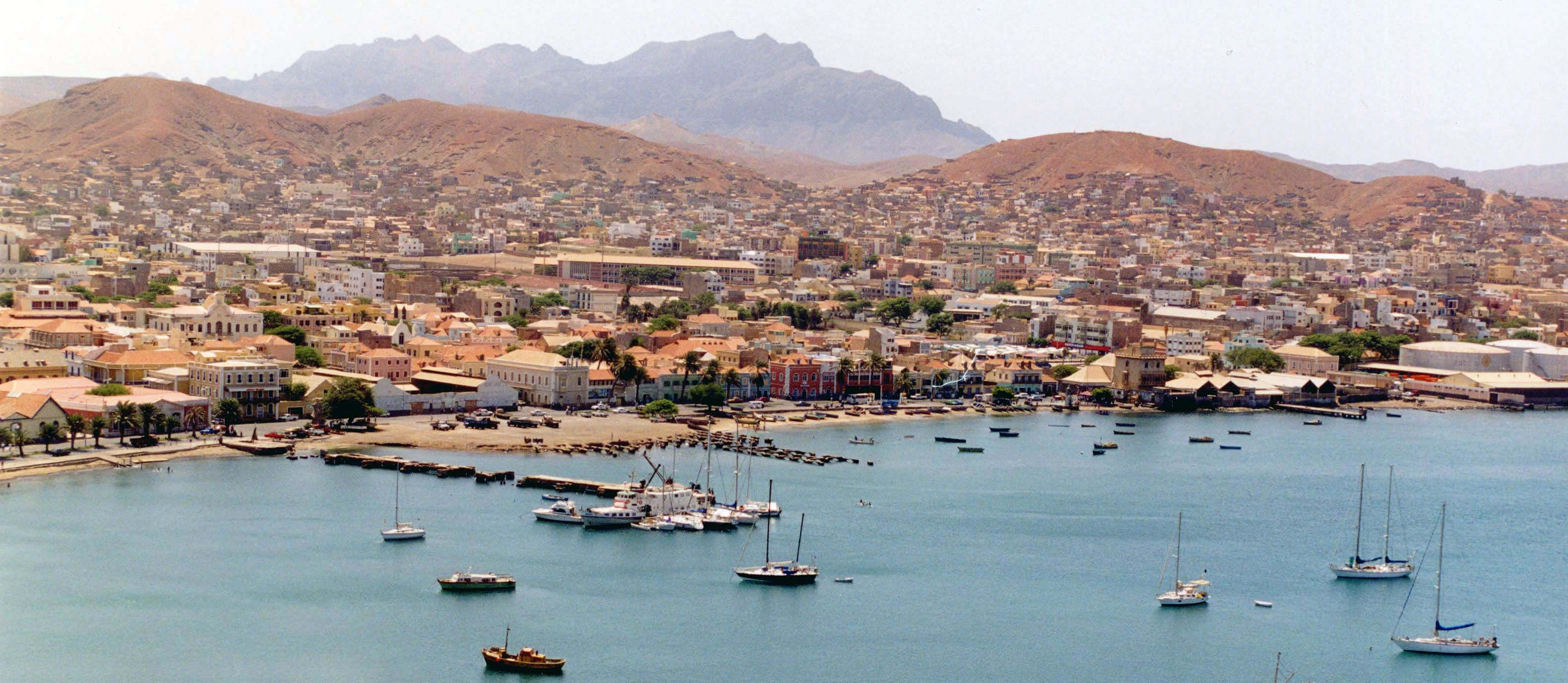
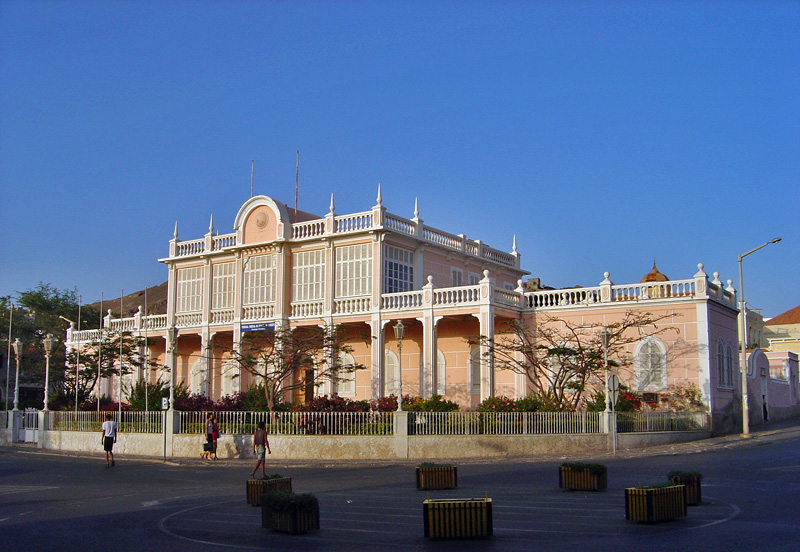
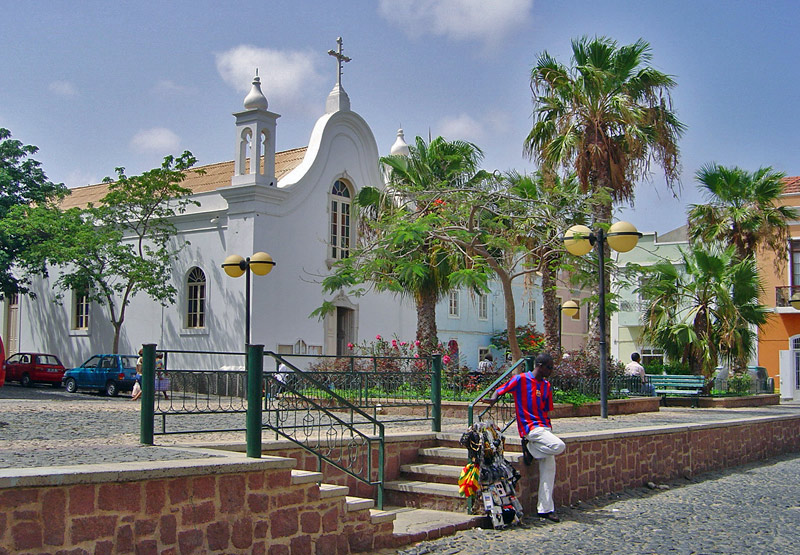
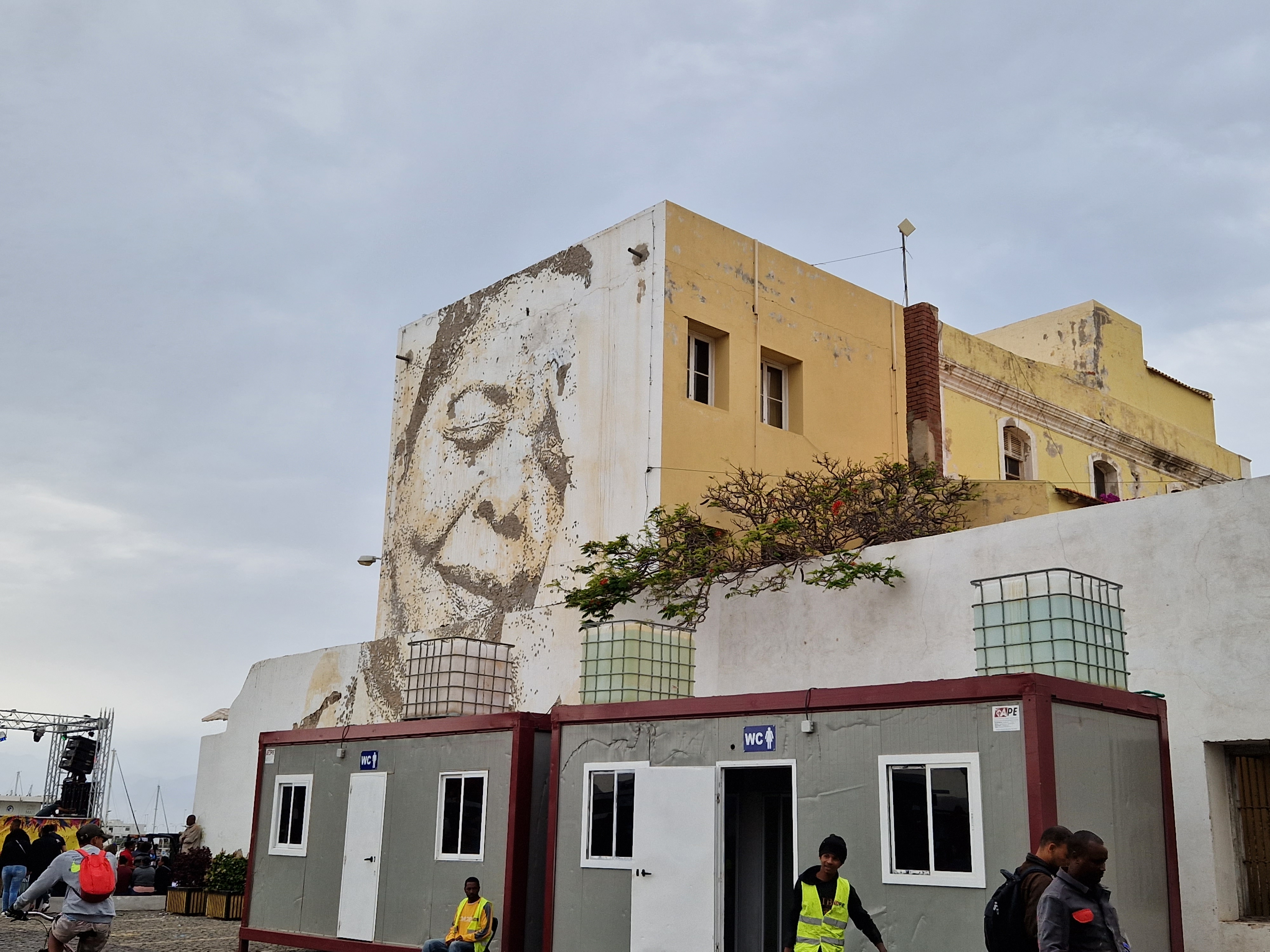
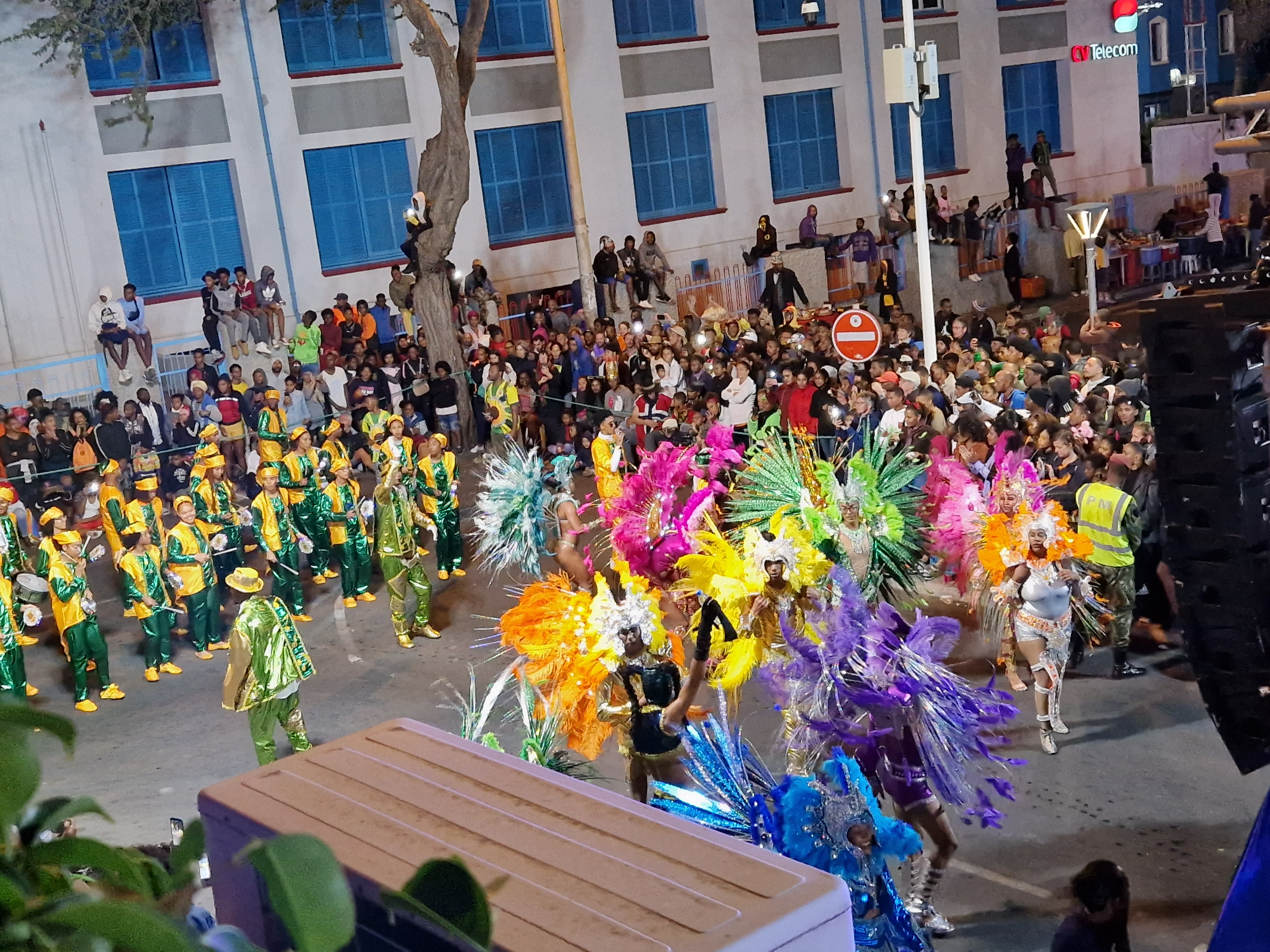
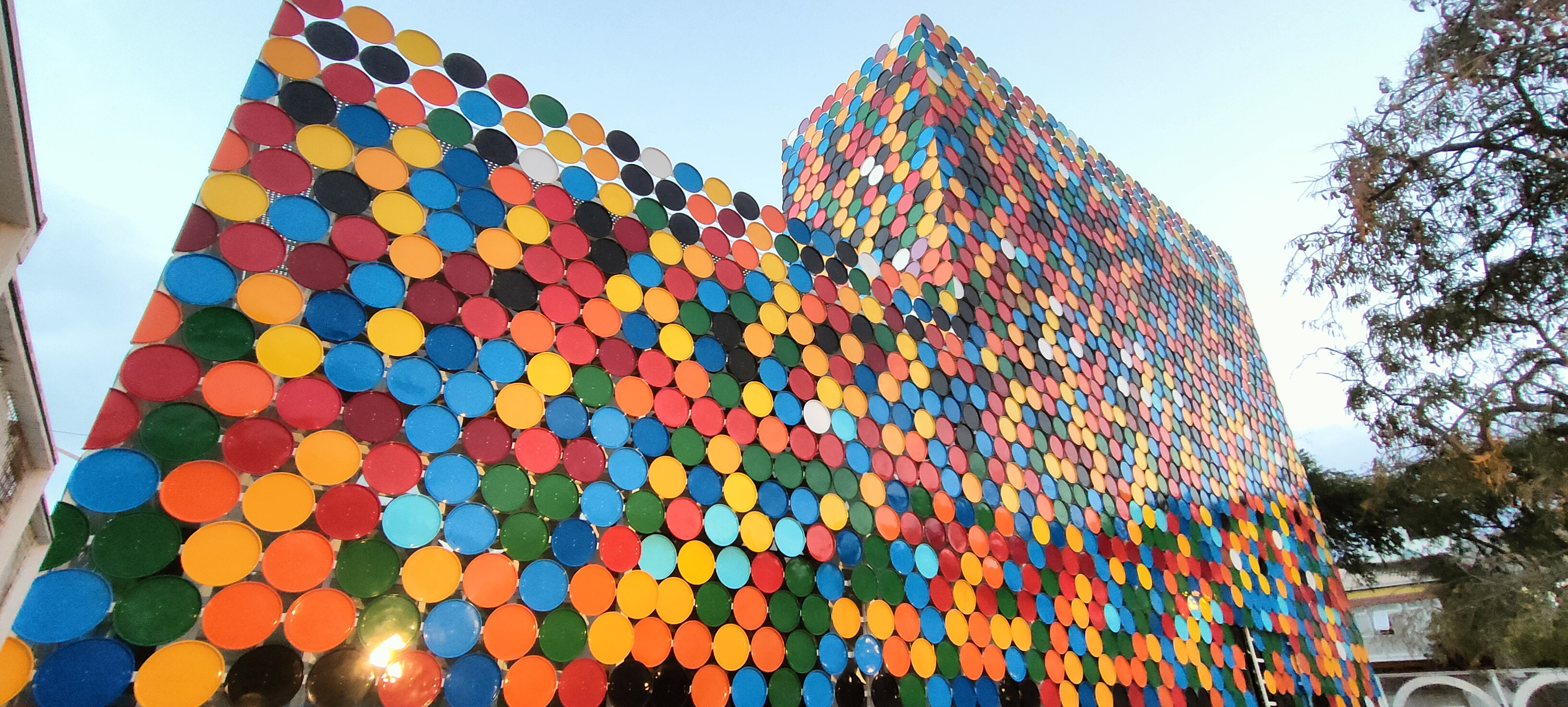
- View of Porto Grande Bay Palácio do Povo Our Lady of the Light Cathedral Portrait of Cesária Évora Carnival of Mindelo Centro Nacional de Artesanato e Design

- Location of Mindelo in Cape Verde Mindelo (Africa)
- Coordinates: 16.886°N 24.988°W
- Island: São Vicente
- Municipality: São Vicente
- Civil Parish: Nossa Senhora da Luz
- Founded: 1793
- City: 1879

Area
  - Total: 67 km^{2} (26 sq mi)

Population (2010 census)
  - Total: 70,468
  - Density: 1,100/km^{2} (2,700/sq mi)
- Time zone: UTC-01:00 (CVT)

Mindelo (Portuguese pronunciation: [mĩˈdɛlu]) is a port city in the northern part of the island of São Vicente in Cape Verde. Mindelo is also the seat of the parish of Nossa Senhora da Luz, and the municipality of São Vicente. The city is home to 93% of the entire island's population and is Cape Verde's second most populous city and largest city in Barlavento Islands. Mindelo is also considered the cultural capital of Cape Verde, known for its colorful and animated carnival celebrations, with roots in Portuguese traditions later influenced by the Brazilian culture.

== History ==
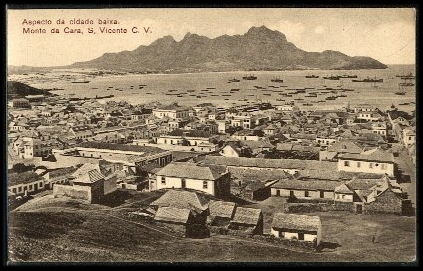
Old postcard of Mindelo from the early 20th century

A settlement at Mindelo was founded in 1793 by the Portuguese. It was initially named Nossa Senhora da Luz, renamed Leopoldina around 1820 after the Queen consort. In 1838 it was renamed Mindelo after the 1832 Landing at Mindelo, north of Porto. It became a coal deposit for ships of the British East India Company in 1838, followed by the Royal Mail Steam Packet Company in 1850. The settlement became a town (vila) in 1858, and had 1,400 inhabitants then. It became a city (cidade) in 1879, and had 3,717 inhabitants then. In 1884 a submarine communications cable was laid between Europe, Africa, India and North America, making Mindelo an important communications centre for the British Empire.

From the beginning of the 20th century the port of Mindelo lost its importance for transatlantic navigation. Causes for this were the shift from coal to oil as fuel for ships, the rise of competing ports like Dakar and the Canary Islands and the lack of investment in port infrastructure. Between 1910 and 1940 there were several strikes in Mindelo, and on 7 June 1934 there were riots in the streets of Mindelo, caused by unemployment and poverty. One man was killed; several were injured.

Between 1940 and 1958 three prolonged periods of severe drought, combined with soil erosion and overgrazing, brought famine in Cape Verde. In the whole archipelago, about 45,000 people died and 20,000 people emigrated. Mindelo attracted immigrants, notably from nearby Santo Antão, and continued to grow.

Mindelo was the cultural capital of the Portuguese-speaking world from November 2002 until November 2003.

== Geography ==
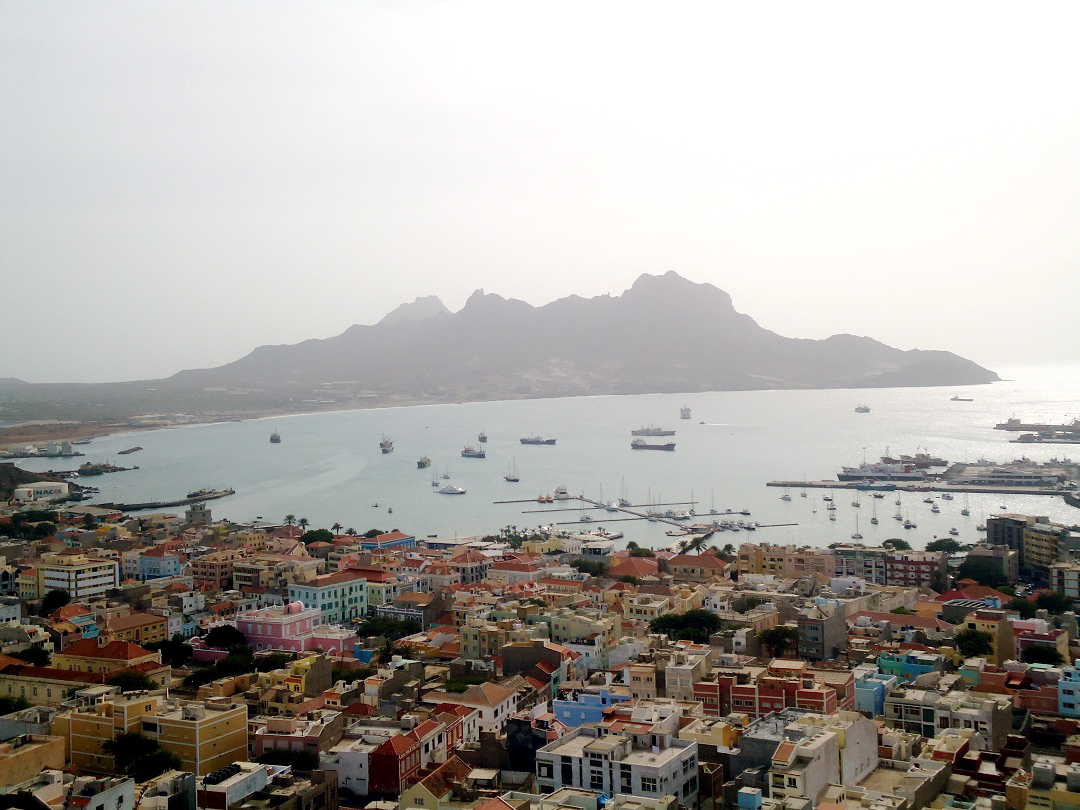
Downtown Mindelo seen from 'Gud'

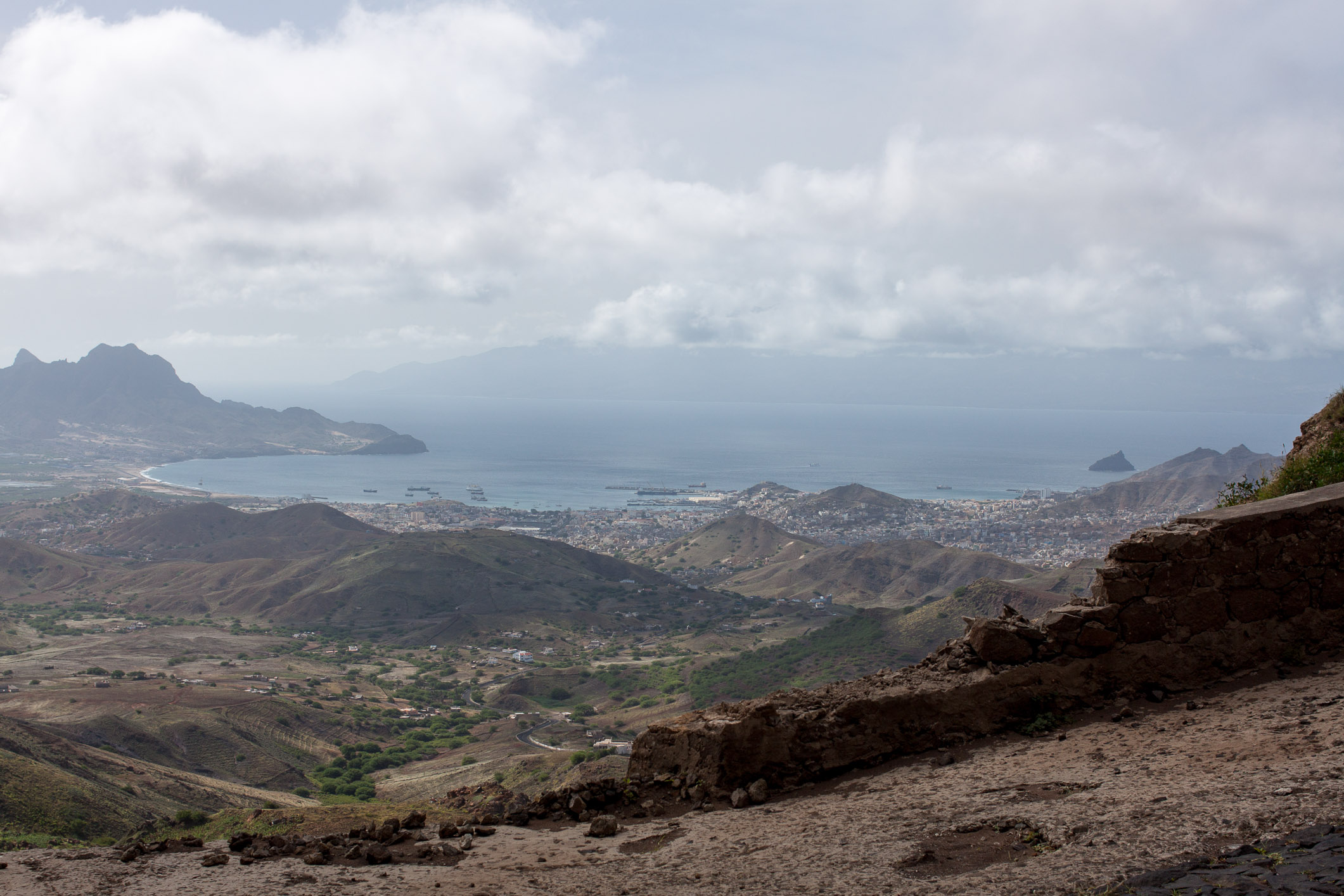
Mindelo, Cape Verde

Mindelo is situated at the Porto Grande Bay, a large natural harbour. The town is surrounded by low mountains: the Monte Cara and the Morro Branco headland to the west, and the Monte Verde to the east. The town is crossed by the river Ribeira de Julião.

The Cesária Évora Airport lies 9 km (6 mi) southwest of Mindelo, near the village São Pedro. Ferries for Santo Antão leave from the port.

=== Subdivisions ===
The city is divided into the following localities for statistical reasons:

- Alto Miramar
- Alto Morabeza
- Alto Santo António
- Alto São Nicolau
- Alto Solarine/Forca
- Atrás do Cemitério/Sul do Cemitério
- Bela Vista/Pedreira
- Campinho
- Chã de Alecrim
- Chã de Cemitério
- Chã de Marinha
- Chã de Monte Sossego
- Chê Guevarra
- City center/Morada
- Cruz João Evora
- Dji d'Sal
- Fernando Pó
- Fonte Cónego
- Fonte Filipe
- Fonte Françês
- Fonte Inês/Espia
- Fonte Meio/Madeiralzinho
- Fortinho/Escola Técnica
- Horta Seca
- Lazareto
- Matiota
- Monte/Craca
- Monte Sossego
- Pedra Rolada
- Ribeira Bote
- Ribeira da Craquinha
- Ribeira de Julião
- Ribeira de Passarão
- Ribeirinha
- Tchetchênia
- Vila Nova/Lombo Tanque
- Zona Industrial Sul
- Zona Militar

=== Climate ===
Mindelo city has a desert climate (Köppen: BWh). The average annual temperature is 24.6 °C (76 °F). It is very dry with only around 100 mm (4 in) annual precipitation.

Climate data for Mindelo (1991–2020)
Month	Jan	Feb	Mar	Apr	May	Jun	Jul	Aug	Sep	Oct	Nov	Dec	Year
Record high °C (°F)	29.2 (84.6)	29.5 (85.1)	30.3 (86.5)	29.5 (85.1)	31.5 (88.7)	30.5 (86.9)	33.6 (92.5)	31.8 (89.2)	32.7 (90.9)	31.5 (88.7)	31.0 (87.8)	30.0 (86.0)	33.6 (92.5)
Mean daily maximum °C (°F)	24.4 (75.9)	24.0 (75.2)	24.4 (75.9)	24.9 (76.8)	25.8 (78.4)	26.5 (79.7)	27.9 (82.2)	29.3 (84.7)	29.7 (85.5)	29.1 (84.4)	27.5 (81.5)	25.8 (78.4)	26.6 (79.9)
Daily mean °C (°F)	22.5 (72.5)	21.9 (71.4)	22.3 (72.1)	22.9 (73.2)	23.8 (74.8)	24.6 (76.3)	25.9 (78.6)	27.1 (80.8)	27.6 (81.7)	27.1 (80.8)	25.6 (78.1)	23.9 (75.0)	24.6 (76.3)
Mean daily minimum °C (°F)	20.5 (68.9)	20.0 (68.0)	20.2 (68.4)	20.8 (69.4)	21.8 (71.2)	22.6 (72.7)	23.6 (74.5)	24.8 (76.6)	25.4 (77.7)	25.1 (77.2)	23.7 (74.7)	22.0 (71.6)	22.5 (72.5)
Record low °C (°F)	16.5 (61.7)	13.5 (56.3)	15.6 (60.1)	15.0 (59.0)	15.0 (59.0)	18.0 (64.4)	17.5 (63.5)	14.5 (58.1)	19.0 (66.2)	18.5 (65.3)	19.0 (66.2)	17.0 (62.6)	13.5 (56.3)
Average precipitation mm (inches)	4.8 (0.19)	1.7 (0.07)	0.4 (0.02)	0.4 (0.02)	0.0 (0.0)	0.0 (0.0)	2.6 (0.10)	16.3 (0.64)	36.2 (1.43)	14.5 (0.57)	6.3 (0.25)	1.0 (0.04)	84.2 (3.33)
Average precipitation days (≥ 0.1 mm)	1	1	0	0	0	0	1	4	5	2	2	2	18
Average relative humidity (%)	66.1	67.6	67.2	68.2	70.1	72.9	72.7	74.0	74.2	72.8	69.4	67.3	70.2
Mean monthly sunshine hours	229.4	237.3	275.9	291.0	306.9	276.0	248.0	226.3	225.0	238.7	225.0	201.5	2,981
Mean daily sunshine hours	7.4	8.4	8.9	9.7	9.9	9.2	8.0	7.3	7.5	7.7	7.5	6.5	8.2
Source 1: NOAA, Instituto Nacional de Meteorologia e Geofísica (precipitation, humidity 1981-2010)
Source 2: Deutscher Wetterdienst (extremes, precipitation days, and sun)

== Economy ==
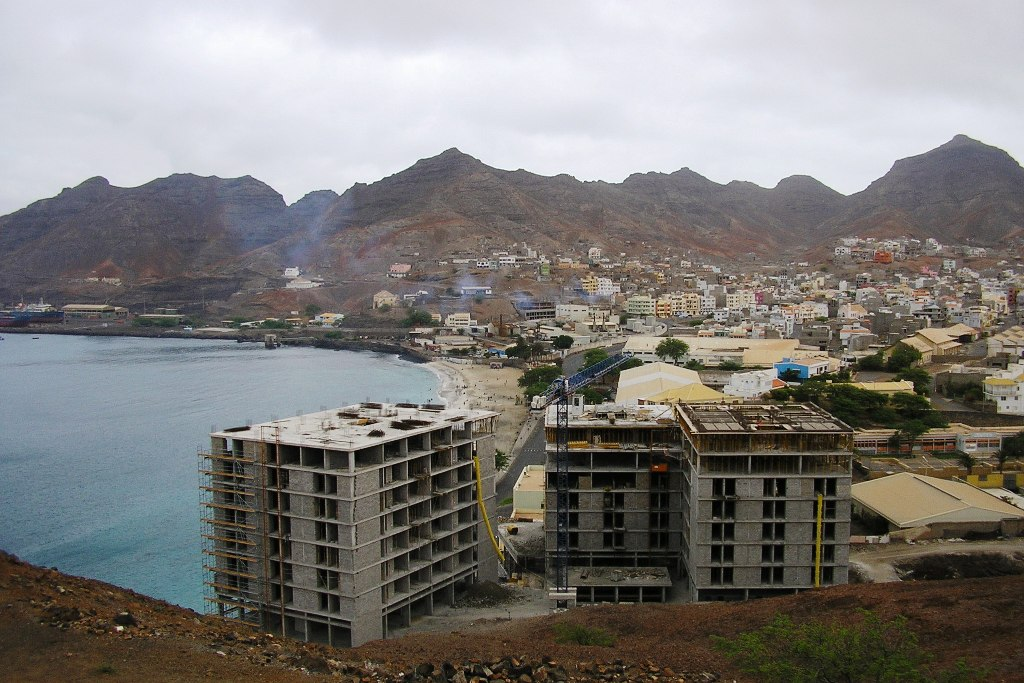
New hotel developments in Praia da Laginha, Mindelo

Its economy consists mainly of business, fishing, shipping, boating and more commonly tourism which developed more recently. Mindelo has several hotels, restaurants and tourist agencies.

== Cityscape ==
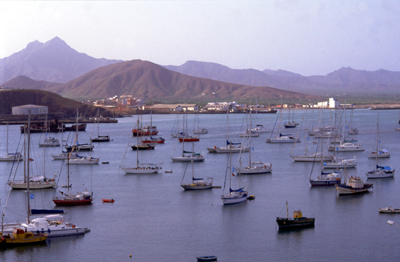
Porto Grande

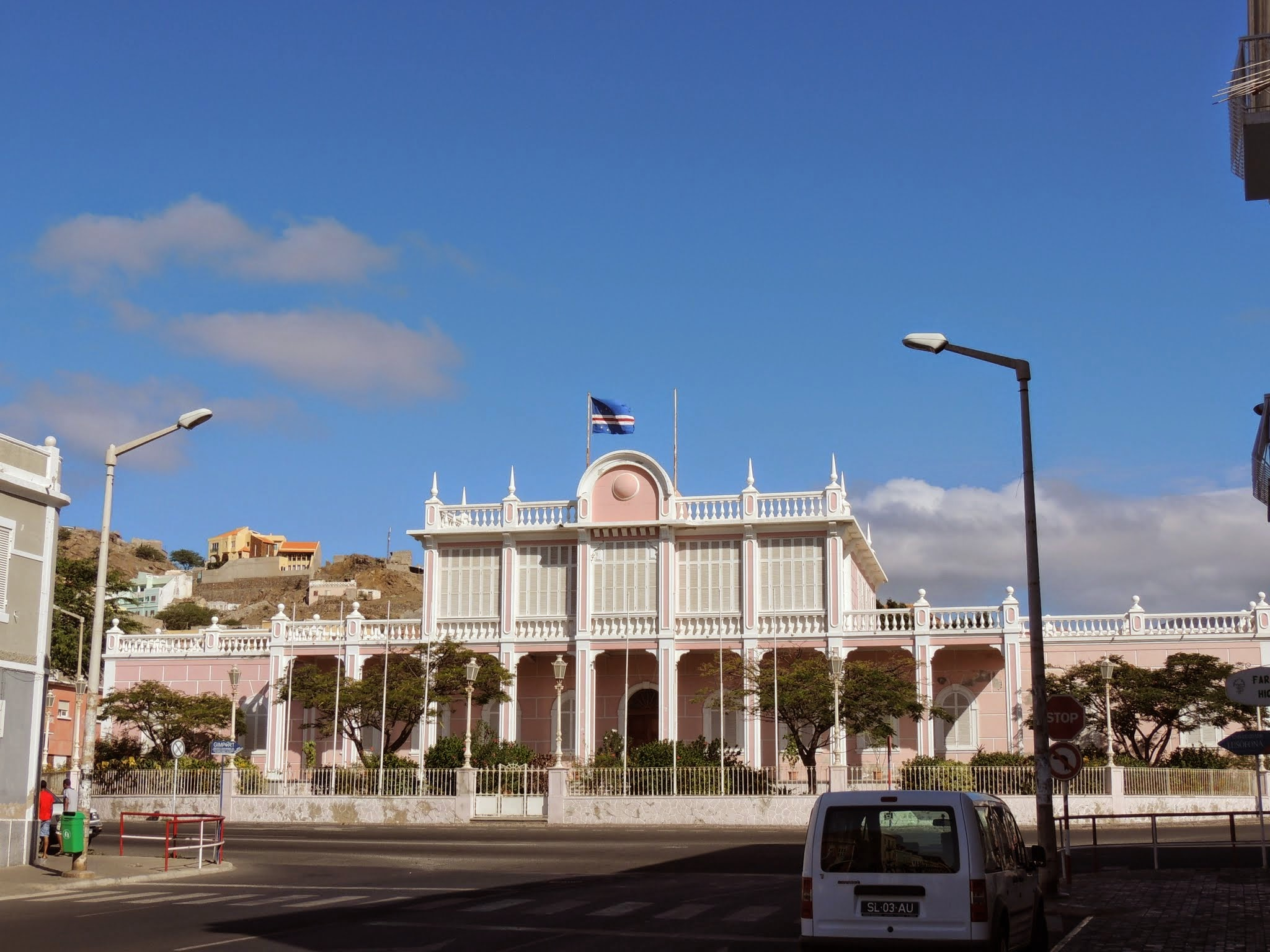
Palácio do Povo

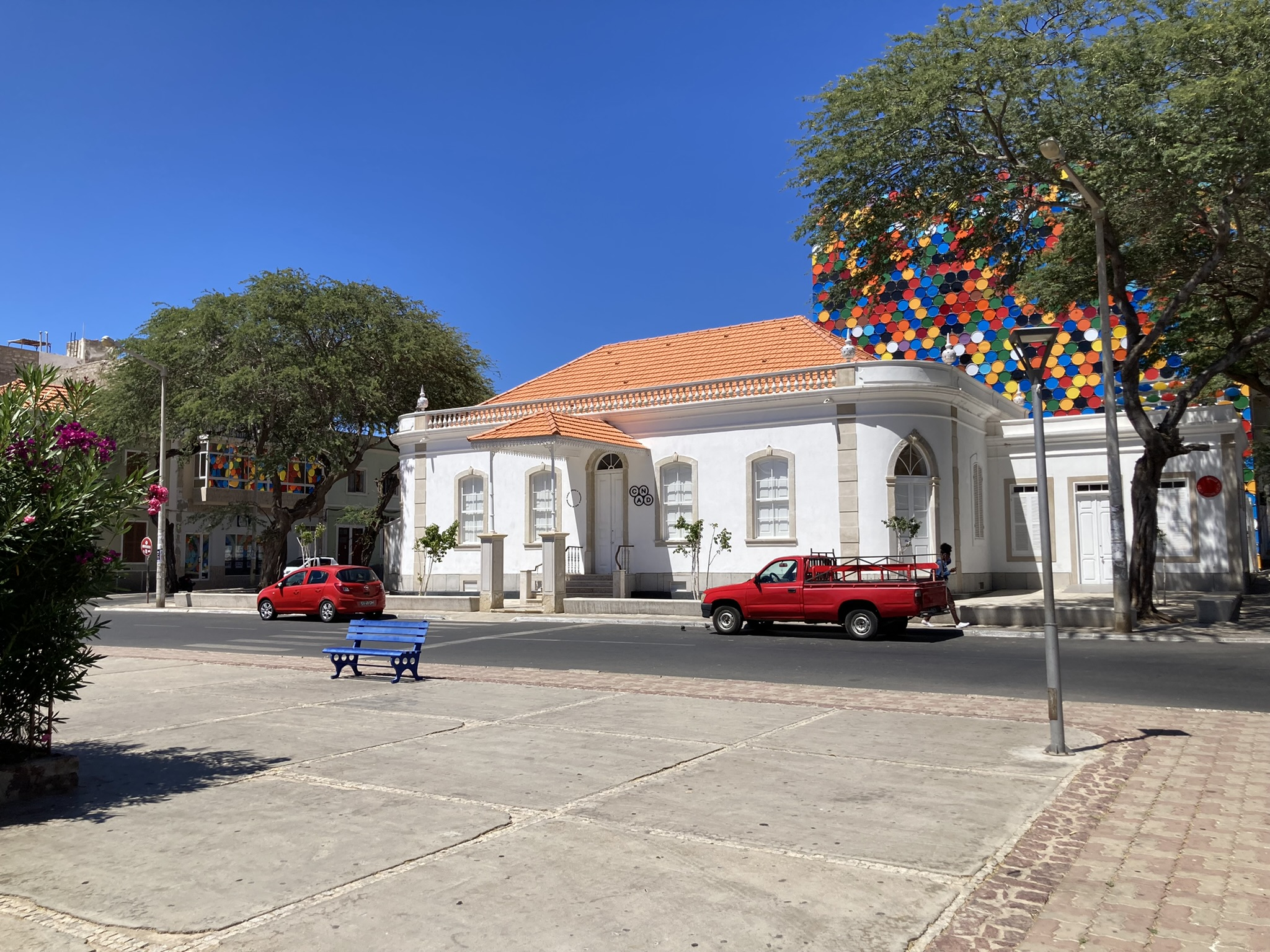
Centro Nacional de Artesanato e Design

The main streets of Mindelo are Avenida Marginal along the waterfront, and the perpendicular Rua Libertadores de África (former Rua Lisboa). Many colonial buildings from the 19th and early 20th century have been preserved in the city centre. Sites of interest include:

- Paços do Concelho, built 1860–1873, the city hall of the municipality of São Vicente
- Palácio do Povo (People's Palace), the former Palácio do Governo (Government Palace), built in 1874, expanded in 1928-34
- Our Lady of the Light Cathedral, Catholic church built in 1862, seat of the Roman Catholic Diocese of Mindelo
- Centro Nacional de Artesanato e Design, built as the house of Senator Vera Cruz at the end of the 19th century, now houses exhibitions from Cape Verdean craftsmen
- Fortim d'El Rei, a former fortress built in 1852
- Torre de Belém, on the waterfront, a 1918-1937 replica of the Belém Tower in Lisbon
- Farol do Ilhéu dos Pássaros, lighthouse on Ilhéu dos Pássaros
- Municipal market, built in 1878
- the former Customs House, now the Cultural Centre of Mindelo, built 1858-1860
- Former British Consulate, built in the 1870s

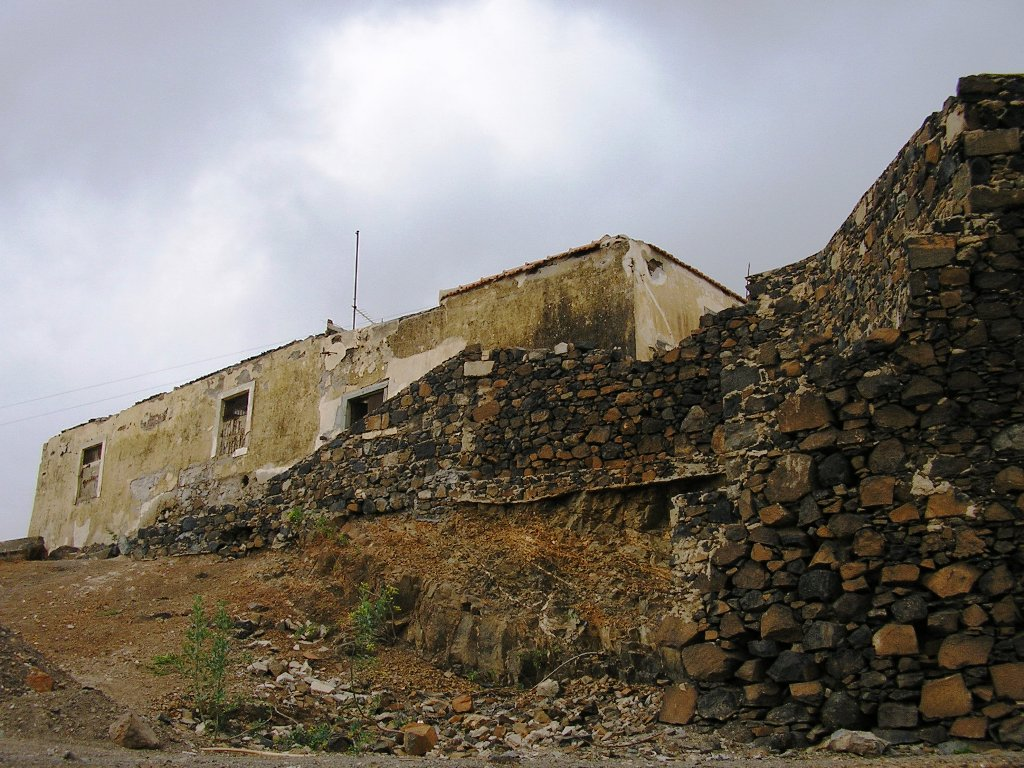
Fortim d'El Rei

=== Statues ===
- Statue of Diogo Afonso on Mindelo Beach - after the explorer of the island
- Statue of Baltasar Lopes da Silva - after one of the most famous writers of Cape Verde

== International relations ==
Mindelo has been twinned with the following cities:

=== Twin towns – sister cities ===
- Porto, Norte, Portugal
- Coimbra, Centro, Portugal
- Kronach, Bavaria, Germany
- New Bedford, United States
- St Helena Bay, Western Cape, South Africa

== Education ==
- University of Cape Verde, Faculty of Engineering and Maritime Sciences and School of Business and Governance
- Jean Piaget University of Cape Verde - Mindelo campus
- University of Mindelo - Cape Verde's third university
- Escola Jorge Barbosa (Liceu Velho) - a campus of the University of Cape Verde
- Liceu Ludgero Lima - A high school

== Demography ==
At the 2010 census, Mindelo had 70,468 inhabitants. It is the second largest city in Cape Verde after Praia.

Population of the city of Mindelo (1980–2010)
1980	1990	2000	2010
36,746	47,109	62,497	70,468

== Sporting teams ==
Mindelo has several sports teams that includes the city, Académica, Corinthians and Derby are clubs that includes the entire island.

- Académica do Mindelo – football, basketball, athletics
- Batuque FC - football
- GS Castilho – football, cricket
- FC Derby – football
- CS Mindelense – football, the oldest club in Cape Verde

The main football stadium is Estádio Municipal Adérito Sena. Basketball, volleyball and futsal are played at Polivalente de Amarante in the southwest.

== Notable people ==
- Josimar "Vozinha" Dias (born 1986) – footballer (Goalkeeper)
- Bana – singer
- Bau – guitar and cavaquinho player
- Yorgan de Castro - mixed martial artist who competes in the Heavyweight division of the UFC
- B. Leza (1905-1958) – writer, composer and singer
- Bela Duarte – artist
- Cesária Évora (1941-2011) – folk singer
- Fantcha – singer
- Humberto Duarte Fonseca (1916-1983) – scientist
- Corsino Fortes (1933-2015) – writer
- Fock – footballer
- Sergio Frusoni (1901-1975) – poet
- António Aurélio Gonçalves (1901-1984)– writer, critic, historian and professor
- Daniel Batista Lima, footballer, football manager
- Noni Lima, footballer, football manager
- Leão Lopes – community developer, documentary-maker, politician
- Manuel Lopes (1907–2005) – writer, one of the founders of Claridade
- João Cleofas Martins (born 1901) - photographer and humorist
- Ovídio Martins (born 1928) - poet
- Vasco Martins – musician
- Tito Paris (born 1968) – musician
- Gualberto do Rosário (born 1950) – acting Prime Minister and later Prime Minister of Cape Verde
- Onésimo Silveira (1935–2021) – poet, diplomat and a political activist
- Jenifer Solidade (born 1984) - singer
- Carlos Veiga (born 1949) – former Prime Minister of Cape Verde
- Jorge Carlos de Almeida Fonseca (born 1950) - former president of Cape Verde
- Dani Pinto (1958), football manager

== See also ==
- History of Cape Verde
- Economy of Cape Verde
