= Ribeira =

Ribeira, Portuguese and Galician for stream or riverside, may refer to the following places:

== Brazil ==
- Ribeira, São Paulo, a city in the state of São Paulo, Brazil
- Ribeira, Rio de Janeiro, a neighborhood in the municipality of Rio de Janeiro
- Ribeira do Amparo, a municipality in the state of Bahia in the North-East region
- Ribeira do Piauí, a municipality in the state of Piauí in the Northeast region
- Ribeira do Pombal, a municipality in the state of Bahia in the North-East region
- Ribeira de Iguape River, a river of São Paulo state

== Cape Verde ==
- Ribeira Brava, Cape Verde, a municipality in the northern part of the island of São Nicolau
- Ribeira Funda, Cape Verde, a settlement in the northern part of the island of São Nicolau
- Ribeira da Barca, a settlement in the western part of the island of Santiago
- Ribeira do Ilhéu, a settlement in the northern part of the island of Fogo
- Ribeira do Calhau, a stream in the eastern part of the island of São Vicente
- Ribeira de Vinha, a village located in the central part of the island of Sao Vicente
- Ribeira da Cruz, a settlement in the northwestern part of the island of Santo Antão
- Ribeira Dom João, a settlement in the southeast of the island of Maio in Cape Verde
- Ribeira da Janela, Cape Verde, a stream that flows in the eastern part of the island of Santo Antão
- Ribeira da Prata, a settlement in the northern part of the island of Santiago
- Ribeira do Paul, a stream that flows in the northeastern part of the island of Santo Antão
- Ribeira Alta, a settlement in the northern part of the island of Santo Antão
- Ribeira da Garça, a river in the northern part of the island of Santo Antão
- Ribeira de Julião, a seasonal stream in the northern part of the island of São Vicente

== Portugal ==
- Ribeira de Pena, a municipality in the Vila Real District, in Norte Region in Portugal.
- Ribeira da Janela, a civil parish in the municipality of Porto Moniz in the Portuguese islands of Madeira.
- Ribeira das Tainhas, a civil parish in the municipality of Vila Franca do Campo in the Portuguese archipelago of the Azores.
- Ribeira do Neiva, a civil parish in the municipality of Vila Verde, Portugal.
- Ribeira, a civil parish in the municipality of Ponte de Lima.
- Ribeira, a parish in the municipality of Terras de Bouro.
- Ribeira, a historical district of Porto and Ribeira Square, the square in its centre.
- Ribeira de Calhau, a settlement in the eastern part of the island of Sao Vicente.
- Ribeira Afonso, a village on the eastern coast of São Tomé Island in São Tomé and Príncipe.
- Ribeira de Nisa e Carreiras, a civil parish in the municipality of Portalegre.
- Ribeira Square, a historical square in Porto, Portugal.
- Ribeira de Pena (Salvador) e Santo Aleixo de Além-Tâmega, a civil parish in the municipality of Ribeira de Pena.
- Ribeira Quente, a civil parish in the municipality of Povoação in the Portuguese archipelago of the Azores.
- Ribeira de Cuncos, a Portuguese ravine that marks the southern point of the disputed section of the Portugal-Spain border.
- Ribeira da Achada, the name of both a stream and a settlement in Calheta (Madeira), in the west of the island of Madeira.
- Ribeira Chã, a civil parish in the municipality of Lagoa in the Portuguese archipelago of the Azores.

== Spain ==
- Ribeira, Galicia, a municipality, civil parish and town in A Coruña province.
- Ribeira de Piquín, a municipality, civil parish and town in Lugo province.

== São Tomé and Príncipe ==
- Ribeira Afonso, a village on the eastern coast of São Tomé Island in São Tomé and Príncipe.
- Ribeira Peixe, a village on São Tomé Island in the nation of São Tomé and Príncipe.

== Others ==
- Ribeira Palace, the main residence of the Kings of Portugal, in Lisbon.
- Ribeira Sacra (DO), a Spanish Denominación de Origen (DO) (Denominación de Orixe in Galician) for wines located in the south of the province of Lugo and in the north of the province of Ourense, in Galicia, Spain.
- Ribeira Bote, a football club that plays in the São Vicente Island League in Cape Verde.
- Ribeira do Rabil Important Bird Area, a wetland site in the Cape Verde archipelago, lying 600 km off the coast of north-west Africa in the Atlantic Ocean.

== See also ==
- Ribeira Brava (disambiguation)
- Ribeira Grande (disambiguation)
- Ribeira Seca (disambiguation)
