= Baleia (São Vicente) =

Valley in western São Vicente

- Location within Cape Verde

Geography
- Location: eastern São Vicente, Cape Verde
- Coordinates: 16.866°N 24.918°W
- Rivers: Ribeira da Baleia
- Interactive map of Baleia

Baleia is a mountain valley in the eastern part of the island of São Vicente. Its orientation is west-east, and it lies south of Baía das Gatas and northwest of the beach Praia Grande. At its western end is Monte Verde, the highest point of São Vicente. At its eastern end is the Atlantic Ocean. Access is either from the coast or from Mato Inglês over a mountain pass.

== See also ==
- Geography of Cape Verde
