= List of ports in Cape Verde =

This is a list of ports in Cape Verde. The major ports are owned by the Cape Verdean port authority, ENAPOR.

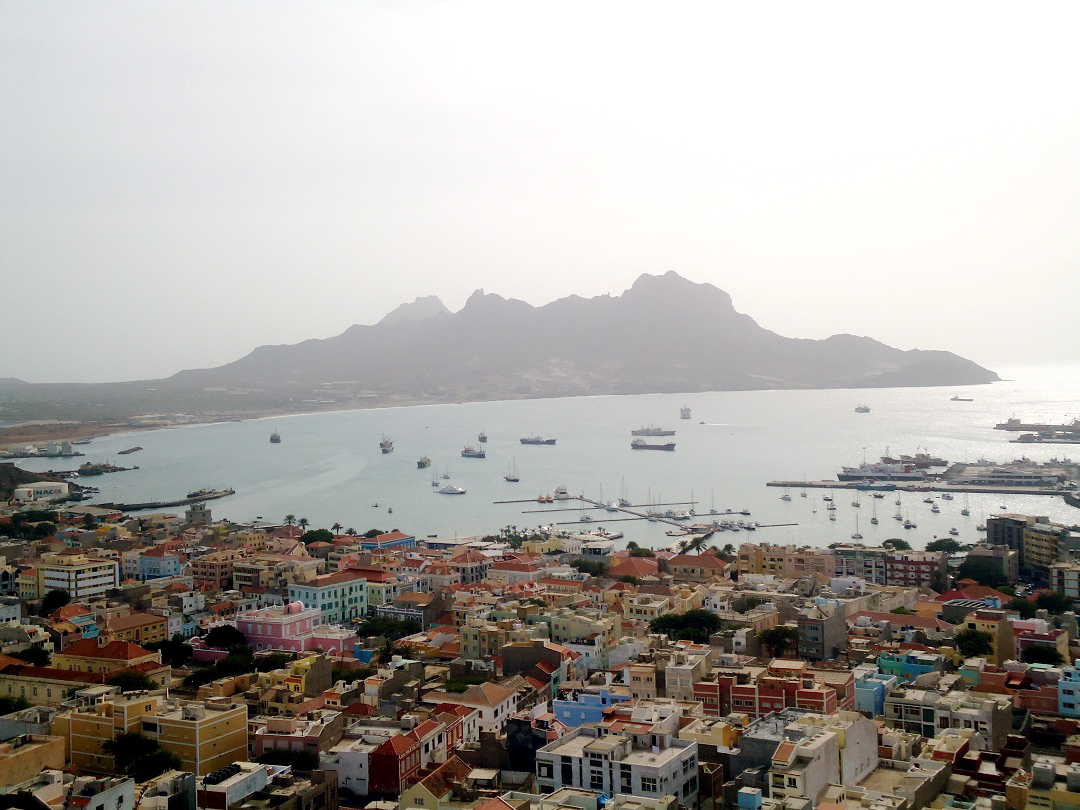
Porto Grande Bay, the major port of São Vicente Island and the country's busiest port

Port	Island
Sal Rei	Boa Vista
Furna	Brava
Vale de Cavaleiros (São Filipe)	Fogo
Porto Inglês	Maio
Palmeira	Sal
Praia	Santiago
Porto Novo	Santo Antão
Tarrafal de São Nicolau	São Nicolau
Porto Grande (Mindelo)	São Vicente
