= Dom Luis Lighthouse =

Lighthouse in Cape Verde

Farol de Don Luis Farol do Ilhéu dos Pássaros
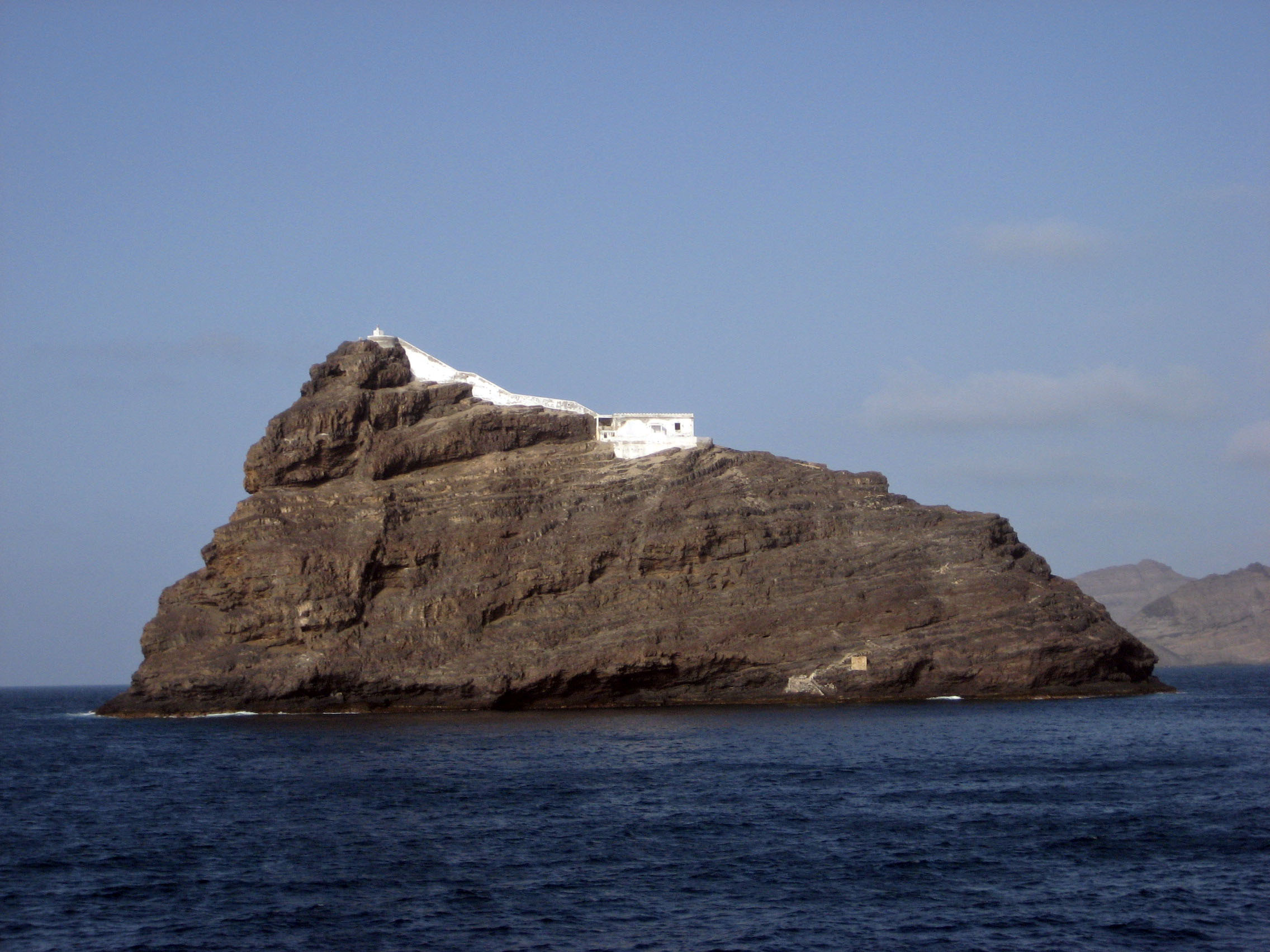
- Location: Ilhéu dos Pássaros near São Vicente, Cape Verde
- Coordinates: 16.9104°N 25.0117°W

Tower
- Constructed: 1882 (first)
- Construction: masonry building
- Height: 5 metres (16 ft)
- Shape: hexagonal prism building with lantern atop
- Markings: white tower, red lantern
- Power source: solar power

Light
- Focal height: 86 metres (282 ft)
- Range: 14 nautical miles (26 km; 16 mi)
- Characteristic: Fl (3) W 12s.
- Cape Verde no.: PT-2024

Farol de D. Luis (also: Farol do Ilhéu dos Pássaros) is a lighthouse on the islet of Ilhéu dos Pássaros, 1.3 km off the coast of the island of São Vicente, Cape Verde. It lies at the entrance to the Porto Grande Bay from the Canal de São Vicente, the strait between São Vicente and Santo Antão. The lighthouse sits atop the highest point of the islet, and is connected to the keepers house halfway down the slope by a stairway. The lighthouse was built around 1882, and was named after king Luís I of Portugal. It is a white hexagonal tower with a small lantern, total height five metres. Its focal height is 86 metres, and its range is 14 nmi (26 km; 16 mi).

== See also ==
- List of lighthouses in Cape Verde
- List of buildings and structures in São Vicente, Cape Verde
