= ENAPOR =

Cape Verdean port authority

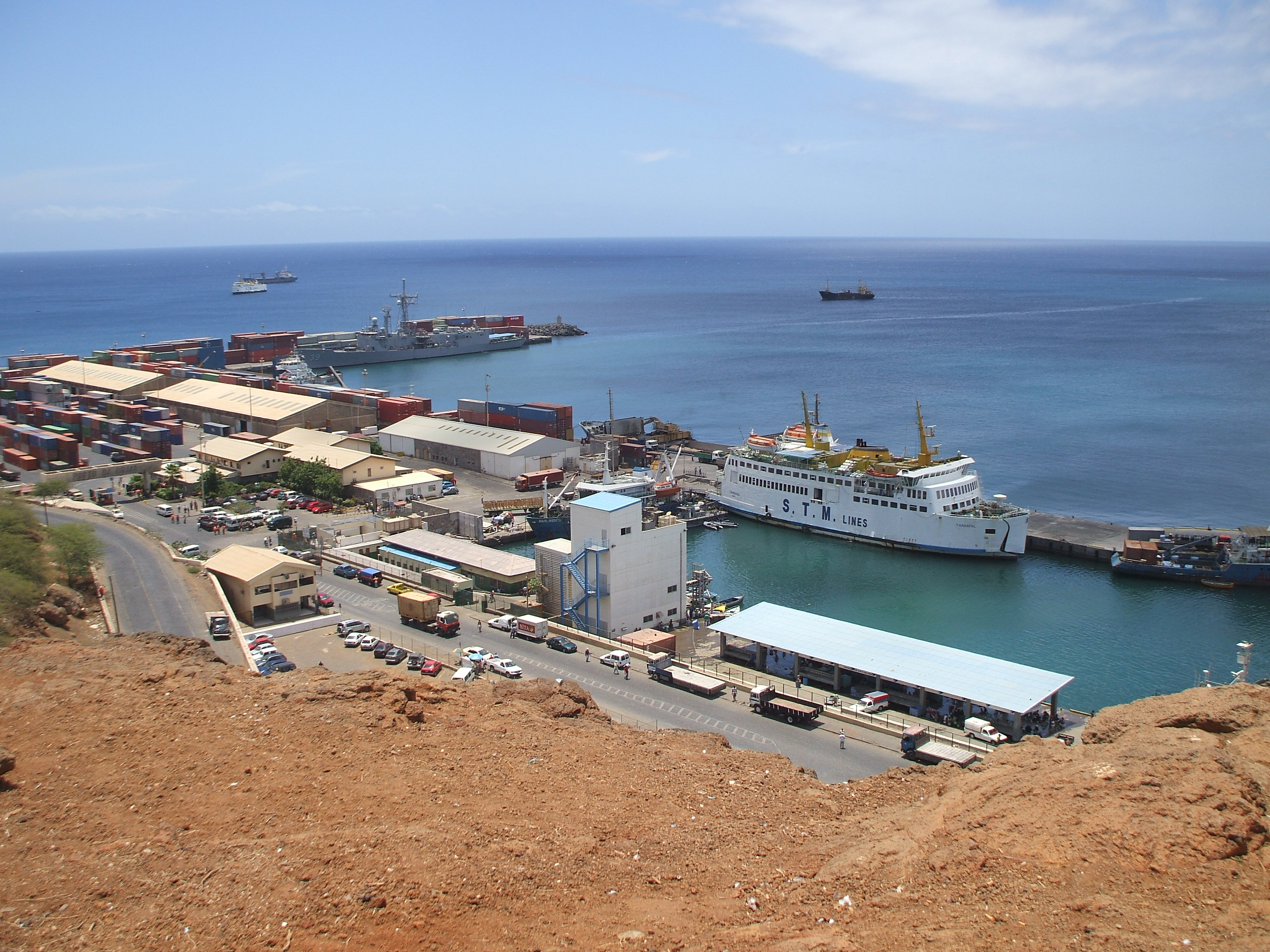
- The Port of Praia
- Company type: Public limited
- Industry: Ports
- Founded: 1982; 44 years ago
- Headquarters: Avenida Marginal, Mindelo, Cape Verde
- Net income: 187.8 million CVE (2016)
- Website: www.enapor.cv

ENAPOR (Empresa Nacional de Administração dos Portos, Portuguese for "National Company for Port Administration") is the Cape Verdean port authority. Its purpose is the administration, management and economic exploitation of the ports, terminals and zones of port jurisdiction of Cape Verde. It is a public limited company, 100% owned by the State of Cape Verde. Its current president is Jorge Pimenta Maurício. In 2017, 2,334,079 tonnes of cargo and 873,915 passengers were handled. The net income of ENAPOR was 187.8 million CVE in 2016.

ENAPOR was established on 19 June 1982 as the successor of the former Junta Autónoma dos Portos de Cabo Verde. In 2005 there were plans to privatize ENAPOR and at least two major ports. An international tender for the sub-concession of the four major ports was launched in 2015, but this was cancelled in 2017.

== Ports ==
ENAPOR manages the following ports:

Port	Island
Sal Rei	Boa Vista
Furna	Brava
Vale de Cavaleiros (São Filipe)	Fogo
Porto Inglês	Maio
Palmeira	Sal
Praia	Santiago
Porto Novo	Santo Antão
Tarrafal de São Nicolau	São Nicolau
Porto Grande (Mindelo)	São Vicente

The two busiest ports are Porto Grande and Praia, each covering about 35% of the maritime cargo traffic of Cape Verde. Several ports have been expanded and modernized recently, including Praia (2014), Palmeira (2015) and Sal Rei (2015). ENAPOR is a member of the International Association of Ports and Harbors (IAPH).

== See also ==
- List of ports in Cape Verde
