= Julião =

Julião (Portuguese for Julian) may refer to:

== People ==
=== Given name ===
- Julião Mateus Paulo (born 1942), Angolan politician
- Julião Sarmento (1948-2021), Portuguese multimedia artist and painter
- Julião da Kutonda (1965-2004), Angolan football defender
- Julião Neto (born 1981), Brazilian flyweight boxer
- Julião Gaspar (born 1981), Angolan handball player

=== Surname ===
- Pedro Julião (1215-1277), Pope John XXI, Portuguese head of the Catholic Church
- Carlos Julião (1740-1811), Italian artist and engineer
- Evaristo Sourdis Juliao (1905-1970), Colombian lawyer and politician
- Francisco Julião (1915-1999), Brazilian lawyer, politician and writer
- Julião (footballer, born 1929), Antonio Elías Julião, Brazilian football midfielder
- David Sánchez Juliao (1945-2011), Colombian author and journalist
- Ronald Julião (born 1985), Brazilian shotputter
- Igor Julião (born 1994), Brazilian football right-back

== Places ==
- Ribeira Julião, a village in São Vicente, Cape Verde
- Ribeira de Julião, a stream in São Vicente, Cape Verde

== See also ==
- Julian (disambiguation)
- São Julião (disambiguation)
