= Praia Grande, Cape Verde =

Beach in Cape Verde

Praia Grande
- Beach
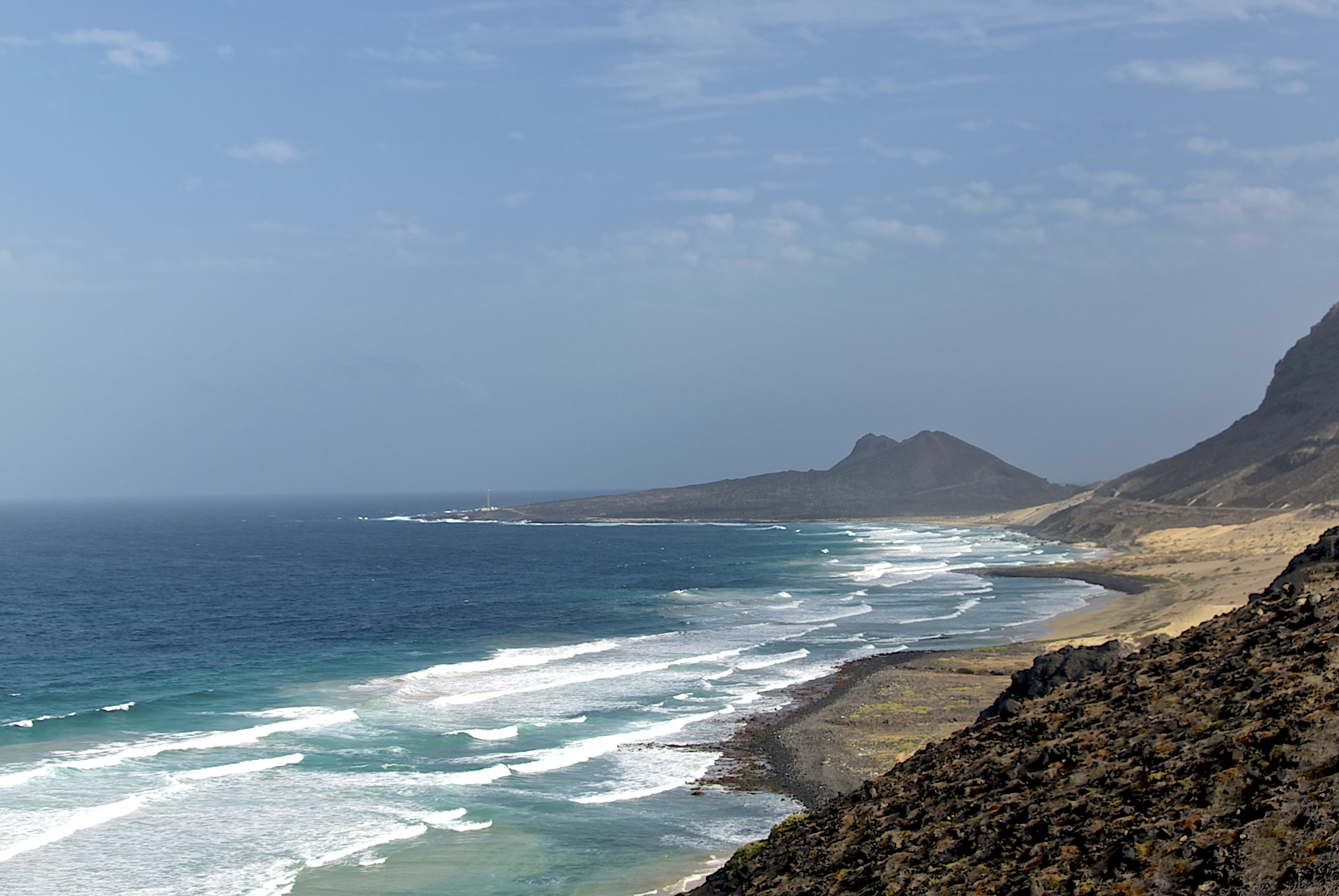

- Location within Cape Verde
- Coordinates: 16.860°N 24.877°W
- Location: Eastern São Vicente, Cape Verde
- Access: road

Praia Grande (Portuguese meaning "large beach") is a large beach on the northeast coast of the island of São Vicente, Cape Verde. It is 1.5 km northwest of the village Calhau. The white sandy beach is surrounded by volcanic rocks. It is accessible by road from Calhau and Baía das Gatas.

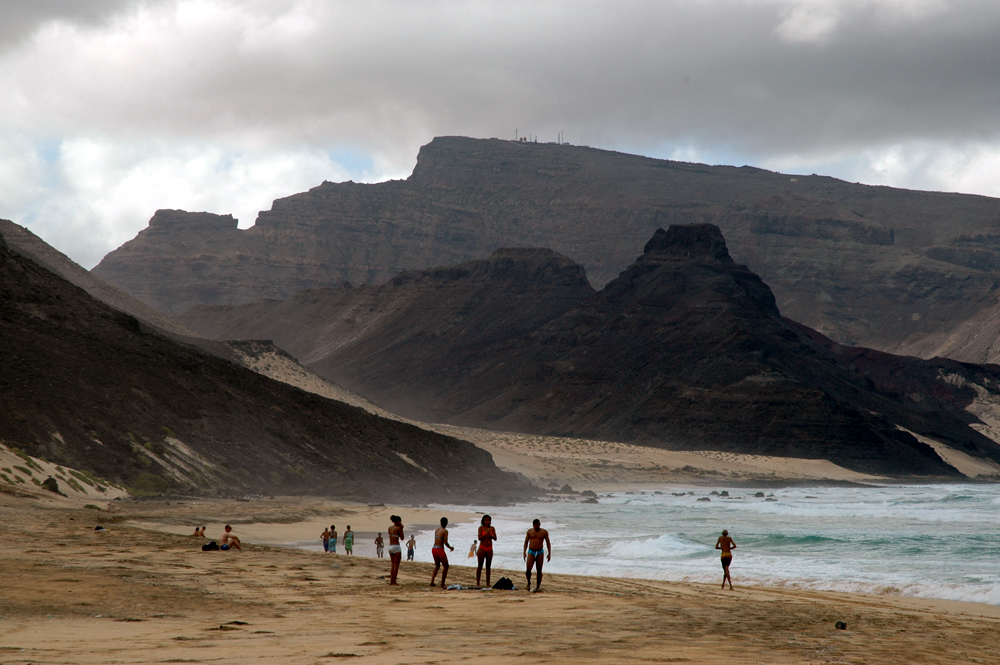
Praia Grande, with a view towards Monte Verde
