= Humberto Duarte Fonseca =

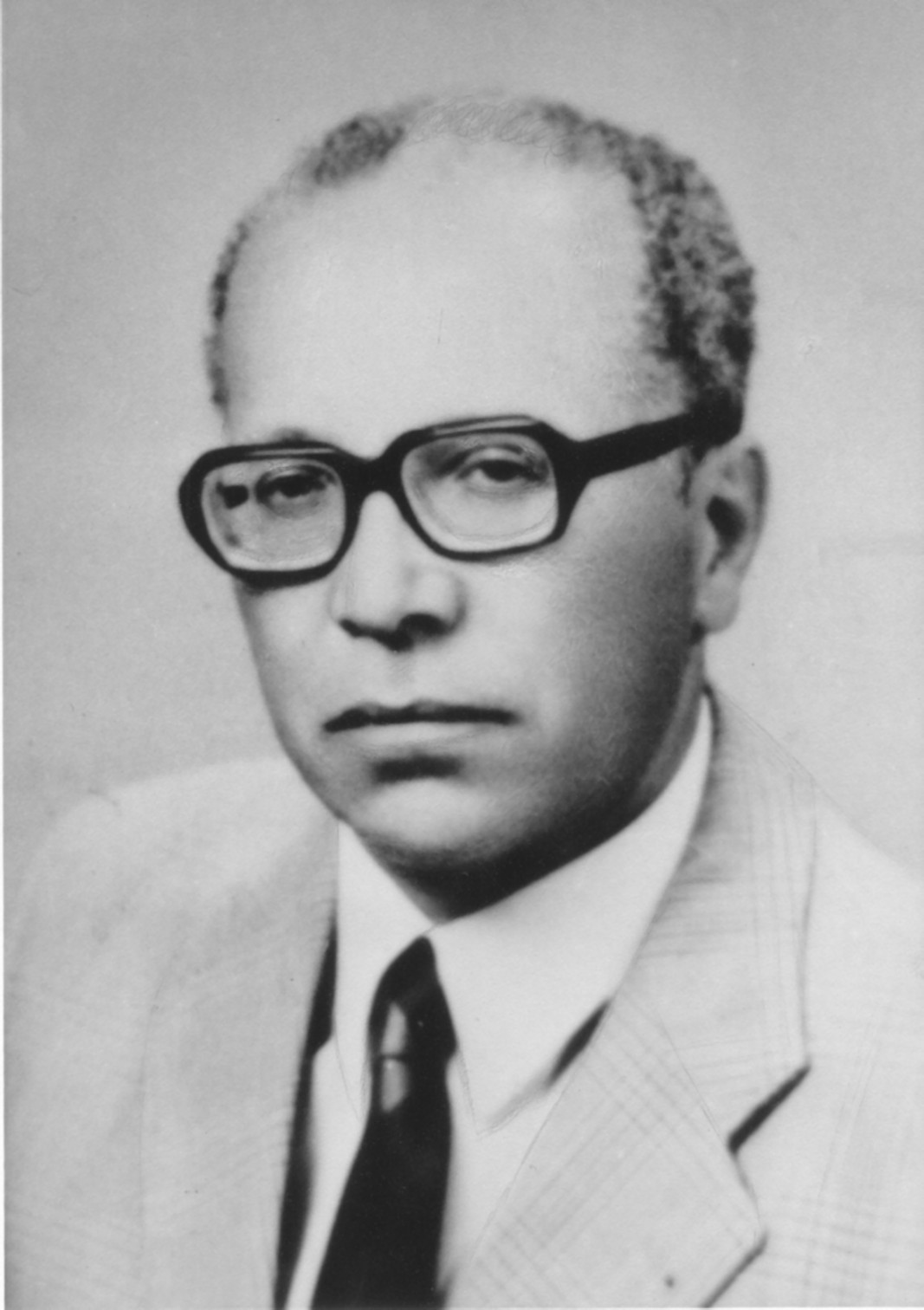
- Born: 20 November 1916; Mindelo, Cape Verde
- Died: 1983 (aged 66–67); Lisbon, Portugal, Portugal
- Education: University of Lisbon

Humberto Duarte Fonseca (20 November 1916 – 1983), was a Cape Verdean scientist.

== Biography ==
Humberto Fonseca was born in Mindelo on São Vicente island and was the son of Torquato Gomes Fonseca and Leopoldina Duarte Fonseca. After high school he was invited to teach at Liceu Gil Eanes in Mindelo for a year, he later attended the Faculty of Sciences at the University of Lisbon, where he achieved three graduations, all with the highest distinction: math, geophysics and geographic engineering.

He later married Maria Adélia de Barros Fonseca and raised three children, all with the surname Barros Duarte Fonseca: Ana Maria, José Pedro and João Filipe.

He died in Lisbon in 1983.

=== Career ===
He entered the National Meteorological Service in 1948, two years later he founded the local Meteorological Observatory in his native city of Mindelo. He was Chief of the Cape Verdean Meteorological Service, sub-director of the Angolan Meteorological Service, and Director of the Geophysic Service and the Portuguese National Meteorological and Geophysical Institute.

He was a chief member during the scientific exploration of Iona and member of the scientific expedition to study the eruption of Pico do Fogo in Cape Verde. He was a Portuguese delegate to International Meteorological Commissions, President of the Portuguese Creativity Association, Director of the Inventive Review and several other roles. He founded the Portuguese Creativity Association in 1970 which promotes the participation of inventors in world level events. He was elected jury member of the International Exhibition of Inventors in Geneva. Duarte Fonseca was honoured as an honorary citizen of Brussels.

== Legacy ==
A decade after his death, he received the Medal of Gold by the city of Lisbon. A symposium was held in 1993 in Cape Verde dedicated to his life and works, and a street and a school in Mindelo are named after him.

In 2006, the Cape Verde Atmospheric Observatory was named after him. It is a bilateral research initiative on climate change and air quality supported by Germany and the United Kingdom and is located in the area of Calhau.

In 2011, the Order of Engineers of Cape Verde paid a posthumous tribute to him, with an exhibition of a film about his life and his work.

== Patents ==
- Mercury Photoelectric Gravimeter (1969)
- Teleondameter impulses (1971)
- Fluxicopter (1971)

== Honours ==
=== National ===
- 1951 - Award of the Overseas Investigation Board
- 1958 - Award at the Angolan Physics Institute
- 1971 - Peixo Correia Ward by the Cuca Foundation
- 1972 - 1st Award of the Inventor's Hall of the FIL
- 1983 - Medal of Honour by the City of Lisbon

=== International ===
- 1969 - Medal of Honour by the City of Brussels
- 1977 - Gold Medal by the European Council on the Development of Commerce, Industries and Finances, Brussels
- 1978 - Honorary member of the Syndicat de Chercheurs of France

== Publications ==
- Fonseca, H. - Algumas notas sobre as chuvas em Cabo Verde e a possibilidade de uma intervenção artificial. In: Cabo Verde : Boletim de Propaganda e Informação. - Ano I, nº 5, p. 5-8. 1950.
- Fonseca, H. - A problemática da energia eólica em Cabo Verde. Bol. de Cabo Verde. 1950
- Fonseca, H. - As crises de Cabo Verde e a chuva artificial. Garcia da Orta.1951
- Fonseca, H. - Análise das precipitações atmosféricas por meio do radar. Junta de Investigações do Ultramar.Editora Ministerio do Ultramar. 103 páginas. 1954.
- Fonseca, H. - Alguns aspectos do problema da modificação das nuvens pelo homem : chuva provocada e luta anti-granizo. Relatório de Estágio. Junta de Investigações do Ultramar. p. 103. Lisboa. 1954.
- Fonseca, H. - O aproveitamento da energia eólica em Cabo Verde. In: Cabo Verde.- Ano 6, nº 69, p. 26-32. 1955.
- Fonseca, H. - Fontes de energia em Cabo Verde e o seu uso no desenvolvimento económico das ilhas. In: Conferência Internacional dos africanistas ocidentais, Lisboa: Atica. - vol. 5, p. 165/1881956. 1956.
- Fonseca, H. - Contribuição para o estudo das manchas solares e a sua influência na chuva em Cabo Verde. In: Conferência internacional dos africanistas ocidentais : 6ª : 2º v. 1956.
- Fonseca, H. - As fontes de energia no arquipélago de Cabo Verde : possibilidades do seu aproveitamento na sua valorização económica. In: Conferência internacional dos africanistas ocidentais : 6ª : 5º v. 1956.
- Fonseca, H. - Sobre as crises de Cabo Verde durante os próximos 100 anos. In: Cabo Verde.- Ano 8, nº 85 (Out. 1956), p. 17-19.1956.
- Fonseca, H. - As crises de Cabo Verde e a chuva artificial. In: Garcia da Orta - Vol.IV, nº 1, p. 11-34. 1956.
- Fonseca, H. - Alguns aspectos da problemática da modificação artificial das nuvens. Junta de Investigações do Ultramar. 1957.
- Fonseca, H. - Viabilidade da estimulação da chuva em Cabo Verde – Vantagens e técnicas aplicáveis. Relatório à Junta de Investigações do Ultramar. 1957.
- Fonseca, H. - Bases cinemáticas e climatológicas para uma previsão a longo prazo das secas no Nordeste Brasileiro e em Cabo Verde. Relatório à Fundação Gulbenkian. 1957.
- Fonseca, H. - Considerações sobre os problemas de energia em regiões tropicais, Revista Cultura. 1958.
- Fonseca, H. - Modernas possibilidades e vantagens da captação da riqueza anemo-energética do litoral português em benefício da indústria de pesca. In: Boletim da Associação Industrial de Angola. - ano X, nº 37, p. 73-98. 1958.
- Fonseca, H. - A seca de 1959 – contribuição para a sua mitigação. Relatório para o Grupo de Trabalho do Governo de Cabo Verde. 1959.
- Fonseca, H. - Considerações sobre a problemática das crises em Cabo Verde. Revista da Junta de Investigações do Ultramar. 1960.
- Fonseca, H. - Sobre a influência do transporte eólico de materiais sólidos nas condições oceanográficas da região costeira de Angola. Comunicação apresentada ao V Congresso Nacional de Pesca. In: Boletim da Pesca.- ano XII, nº 70. p. 81-92. Lisboa. 1961.
- Fonseca, H. - Considerações em torno da problemática das crises de Cabo Verde. In: Garcia de Orta : revista da Junta das Missões Geográficas e de Investigações do Ultramar / Junta das Missões Geográficas e de Investigações do Ultramar. - Vol. 9, n.º 1, p. 17-26. 1961.
- Fonseca, H. - Contribuição para o estudo do problema bio-climático do milho em Cabo Verde. In: Cabo Verde : boletim de propaganda e informação. - Ano XIII, n.º 156, p. 44-57. 1962.
- Fonseca, H. - Contribuição para o estudo das grandes tempestades e inundações em Cabo Verde. Relatório à Brigada de Estradas, Governo de Cabo Verde. 1962.
- Fonseca, H. - Bases para o estudo da modificação da estrutura administrativa de Cabo Verde. In mensagem das forças vivas do Mindelo a S. Exª o Ministro do Ultramar. 1962.
- Fonseca, H. - Mensagem das forças vivas do Mindelo a sua Excelência o Ministro do Ultramar Professor Doutor Adriano Moreira.- Mindelo : Associação Comercial, Industria e Agrícola de Barlavento. - 33 p. 1962.
- Fonseca, H. - Contribuição para o estudo do mecanismo do tempo em Angola. Memória do Serviço Meteorológico de Angola (SMA). 1963.
- Fonseca, H. - Alguns aspectos da incidência das variações climáticas e oceanográficas na planificação da indústria da pesca. In: Cabo Verde. - ano XIV nº 9 - 165, p. 4/13. 1963.
- Fonseca, H. - Plano de criação de um Instituto Gulbenkian de Cabo Verde. Entregue à Fundação Calouste Gulbenkian como contribuição da visita do seu Presidente a Cabo Verde.
- Fonseca, H. - Princípio da Ensilagem Bioclimática natural em Cabo Verde.
- Fonseca, H. - Contribuição para o estudo da evolução agrária e climática de Cabo Verde do descobrimento à actualidade. 1964.
- Fonseca, H. - Contribuição para o estudo do aproveitamento racional da energia do vento no território nacional. Memória do SMA. 1964.
- Fonseca, H. - Evolução agro-pecuária de Cabo Verde. In: Geographica / dir. Raquel Soeiro de Brito. - Lisboa : Sociedade de Geografia de Lisboa. - Nº 10, p. 68-87. 1967.
- Fonseca, H. - Contribuição para o conhecimento da evolução climática da região Circum-Cabo-Verdiana. In: Geographica : revista da Sociedade de Geografia de Lisboa / direcção de Raquel Soeiro de Brito. - Ano III, n.º 11, p. 72-82. 1967.
- Fonseca, H. - Sobre um novo dispositivo de captação de energia do vento e sua aplicação à riqueza anemo-energética nacional - Barragem Anemomotriz. 1968.
- Fonseca, H. - Algumas implicações biometeorológicas no problema do trabalho. Segundas Jornadas de Engenharia e Arquitectura do Ultramar. 1969.
- Fonseca, H. - Alguns elementos meteorológicos de interesse para as redes de telecomunicações e electricidade de Angola. Memória do SMA. 1969.
- Fonseca, H. - Contribuições para o problema hidrológico do Distrito de Moçâmedes (Contributions on Hydrologic Problem in Moçâmedes District (now Namibe)). Memória do SMA. 1970.
- Fonseca, H. - A infraestrutura humana das actividades meteorológicas. Memória do SMA. 1970.
- Fonseca, H. - A calema na costa Angolana. Simpósio sobre Agitação Marítima. In: Revista de Angola: quinzenário ilustrado: - XII ano, nº 249, p. 17. Lisboa. 1971.
- Fonseca, H. - Contribuição para o conhecimento da Agitação Marítima na Faixa Costeira de Angola. Comunicação ao Simpósio sobre agitação Marítima. Lisboa. 1971.
- Fonseca, H. - A Meteorologia e a problemática humana do meio ambiente. Luanda. 1971.
- Fonseca, H. - Algumas considerações sobre a Tecno-Ciência Meteorológica e o Meio ambiente Humano. Memória do SMA. 1972.
- Fonseca, H. - Alguns aspectos do problema da poluição em ligação com os parâmetros meteorológicos e a circulação em geral. Memória do SMA. 1972.
- Fonseca, H. - Hora Legal - Implicações bio-meteorológicas no problema do trabalho. Terceiro Congresso Nacional de Prevenção de Acidentes de Trabalho e Doenças Profissionais. 1973.
- 100 anos de Cooperação Internacional em Meteorologia (100 Years of International Cooperation in Meteorology). 1973.
- Fonseca, H. - Meteorologia e Turismo. Memória do SMA. 1974.
- Fonseca, H. - Aspectos da problemática nacional de uma informação para a inovação. Comunicação apresentada ao Simpósio da Ordem dos Engenheiros. 1980.
- Fonseca, H. - Subsídios para a história da evolução do problema das energias renováveis em Portugal até à crise energética. Revista Inventiva, nº 30/31, Abril/Setembro 1980.
- Fonseca, H. - Mobilização da massa cinzenta criativa nacional ou dependência, eis o drama nacional - CEE. in Revista Inventiva, nº 36, Outubro/Dezembro, 1981.
