= Baleia =

Baleia (Portuguese pronunciation: [ba'lejɐ], meaning whale in the Portuguese language) may refer to:

- In Brazil:
  - Baleia State Park, a protected area in Minas Gerais
- In Cape Verde:
  - Achada Baleia, a settlement on the island of Santiago
  - Baleia (São Vicente), a valley on the island of São Vicente
- In Portugal:
  - Atouguia da Baleia, a parish in the municipality of Peniche
- In Romania:
  - Baleia, tributary of the Jiul de Vest in Hunedoara County
  - Baleia River (Murgușa), tributary of the Murgușa in Hunedoara County
- In São Tomé and Príncipe:
  - Ponta Baleia, a headland in southern São Tomé

== People ==
- Baleia Rossi (born 1972), Brazilian politician and entrepreneur
- Juca Baleia (born 1959), Brazilian footballer and manager
