= Pico do Vento =

Mountain in Cape Verde

- Location within Cape Verde

Highest point
- Elevation: 434 m (1,424 ft)
- Coordinates: 16°50′07″N 24°53′32″W

Naming
- Pronunciation: Portuguese: [ˈpiku du ˈvẽtu]

Geography
- Location: island of São Vicente, Cape Verde

Pico do Vento is a mountain in the eastern part of the island of São Vicente. It is situated south of the Ribeira do Calhau valley, 12 km southeast of the island capital Mindelo.

== See also ==
- List of mountains in Cape Verde
