= Vale de Cavaleiros =

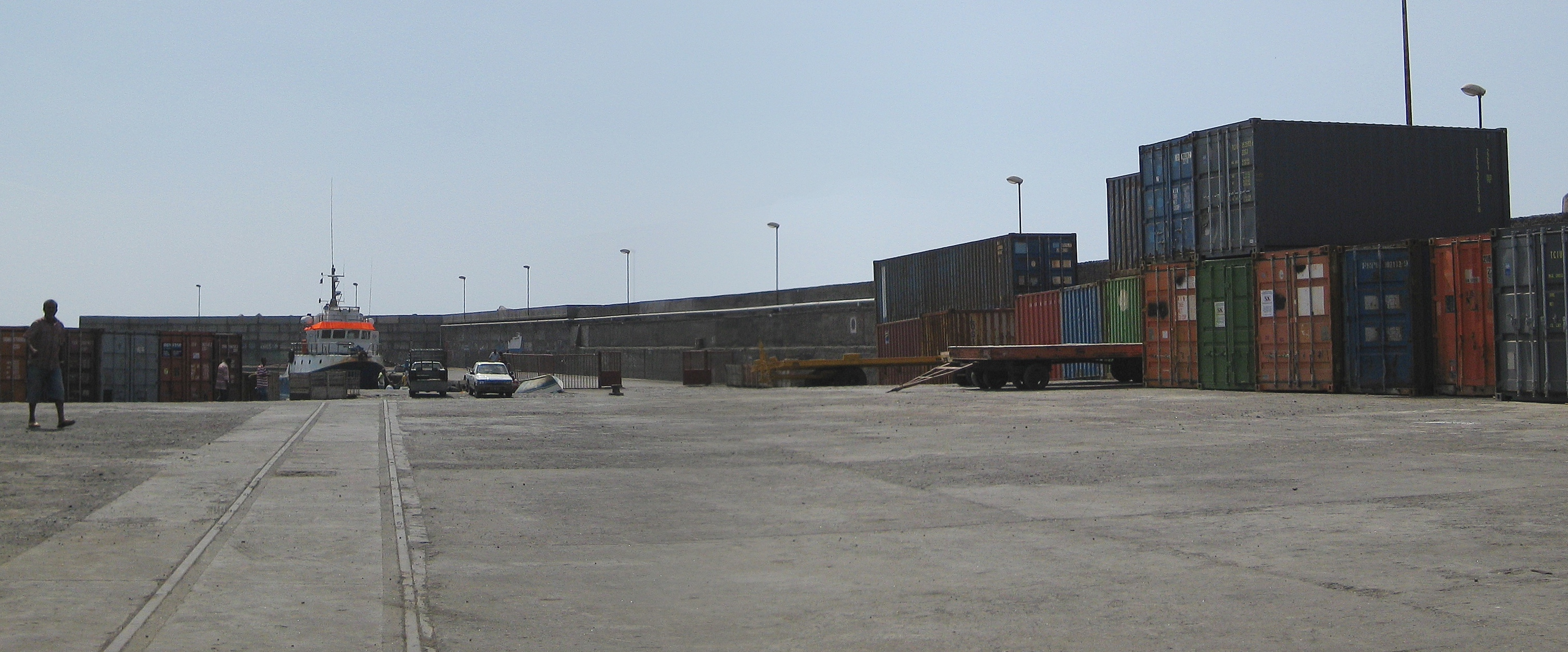
- The port of Fogo
- Interactive map of Vale de Cavaleiros
- Location in Cape Verde

Location
- Country: Cape Verde
- Location: São Filipe, Fogo
- Coordinates: 14°55′13″N 24°30′13″W

Details
- Owned by: ENAPOR
- Type of harbour: Artificial

Vale de Caveiros is the port of the island of Fogo, Cape Verde. It is situated 3 km north of the city of São Filipe. The port is managed by the national port authority ENAPOR. The port was reconstructed and expanded in 2013. It is a member port of the International Association of Ports and Harbors (IAPH).

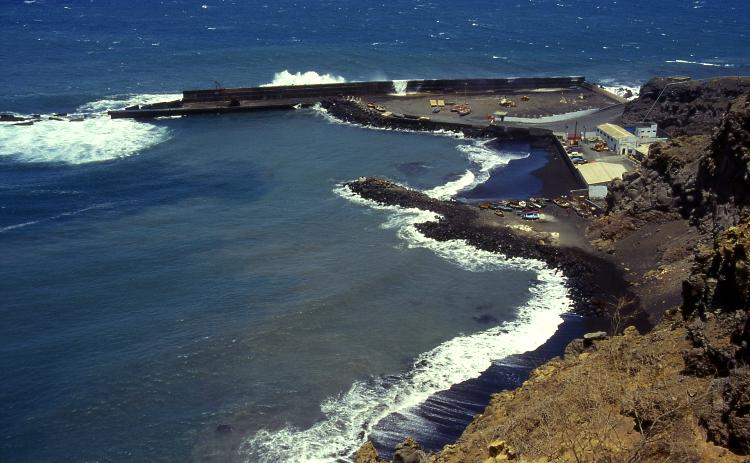
Porto de Vale de Cavaleiros in 1994

== See also ==
- List of ports in Cape Verde
