= Ponta João Ribeiro =

- Cape
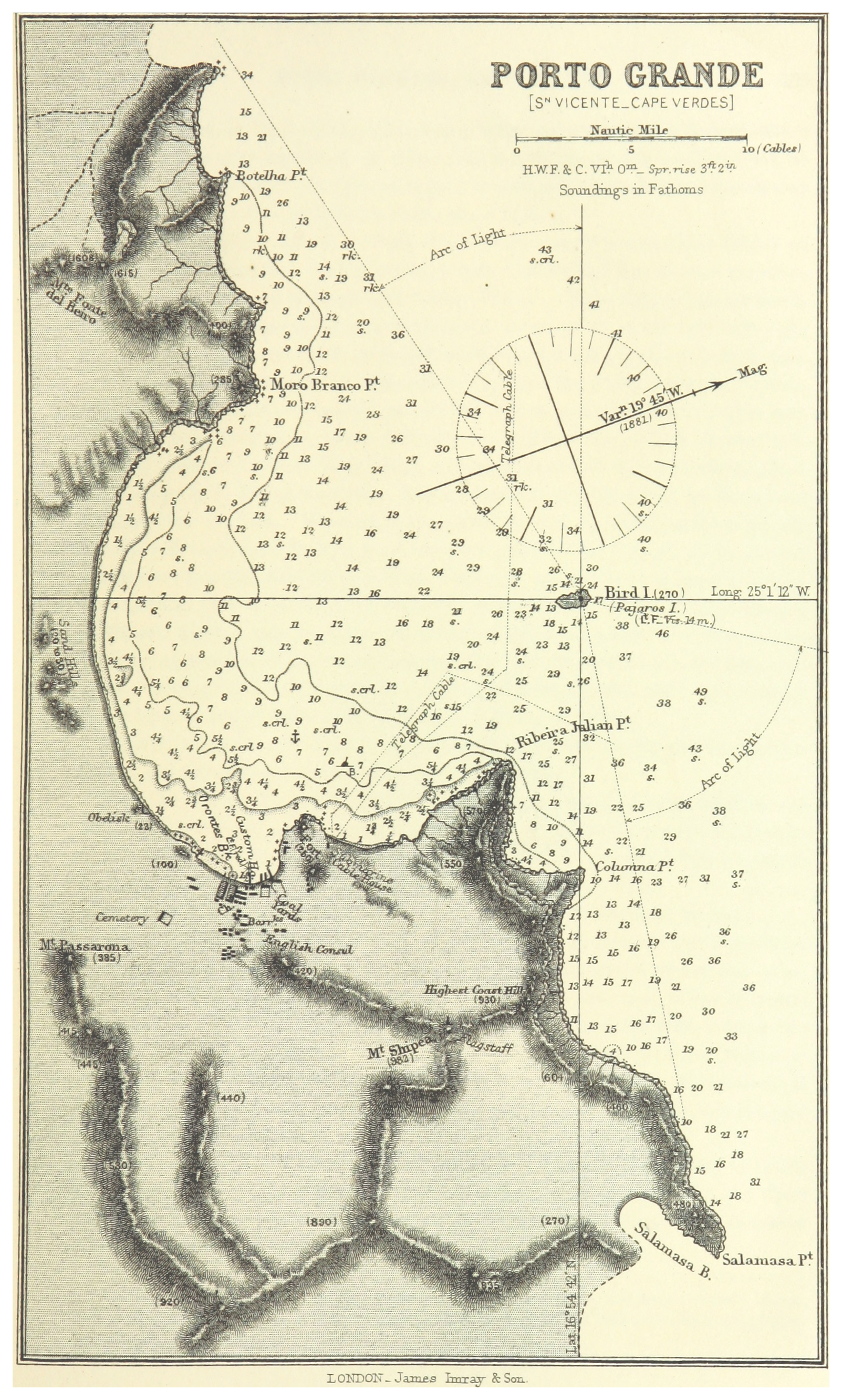
- The headland (indicated as Ribeira Julian Pt.) on an 1884 map

- Location within Cape Verde
- Coordinates: 16°54′22″N 24°59′56″W
- Location: Northern São Vicente, Cape Verde
- Water bodies: Porto Grande Bay, Canal de São Vicente

Ponta João Ribeiro is a cape in the northern part of the island of São Vicente, Cape Verde. It is 2.5 km northwest of the city centre of Mindelo. The cape divides the Canal de São Vicente and the Porto Grande Bay. The islet of Ilhéu dos Pássaros is approximately 1.3 km to the west. Near the cape is an abandoned military camp.

== See also ==
- Geography of Cape Verde
