= Morro Branco =

Morro Branco can refer to:

- Morro Branco, Cape Verde, a low mountain in the west of the island of São Vicente, Cape Verde
- Praia de Morro Branco, a beach in Beberibe, Ceará, Brazil
