= João Ribeiro =

João Ribeiro may refer to:

- João Ribeiro de Barros (1900–1947), Brazilian aviator
- João Ubaldo Ribeiro (1941–2014), Brazilian author
- João Paulo Pinto Ribeiro, Portuguese football forward
- João Ribeiro (footballer) (born 1987), Portuguese football midfielder
- João Ribeiro (canoeist) (born 1989), Portuguese sprint canoeist
- João Ribeiro (politician) (born 1987), Portuguese politician
- João Luiz Ribeiro (born 1959), Brazilian gymnast
- Ponta João Ribeiro, cape located in the island of São Vicente
