= Calhau =

Calhau is a Portuguese surname. Notable people with the surname include:

- Fernando Calhau (1948–2002), Portuguese artist
- Vitória Calhau (born 2000), Brazilian professional footballer

== See also ==
- Ribeira de Calhau, settlement in the eastern part of the island of São Vicente, Cape Verde
- Ribeira do Calhau, stream in the eastern part of the island of São Vicente in Cape Verde
