= Madeiral =

Monte Madeiral
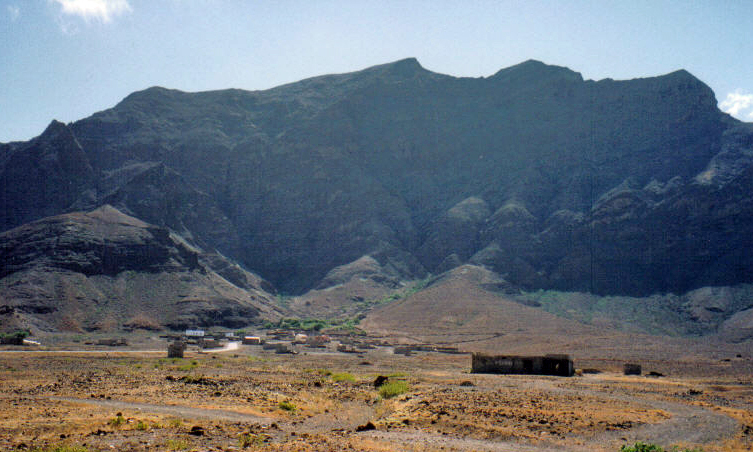
- Monte Madeiral seen from the north

Highest point
- Elevation: 680 m (2,230 ft)
- Listing: List of mountains in Cape Verde
- Coordinates: 16°48′54″N 24°56′02″W

Geography
- Location within Cape Verde
- Location: eastern São Vicente

Madeiral or Monte Madeiral is a mountain in the southeastern part of the island of São Vicente, Cape Verde. Its elevation is 680 meters. The village Madeiral, part of the settlement Ribeira de Calhau, lies at its northern foot.
