= Ilhéu dos Pássaros =

Island in Cape Verde

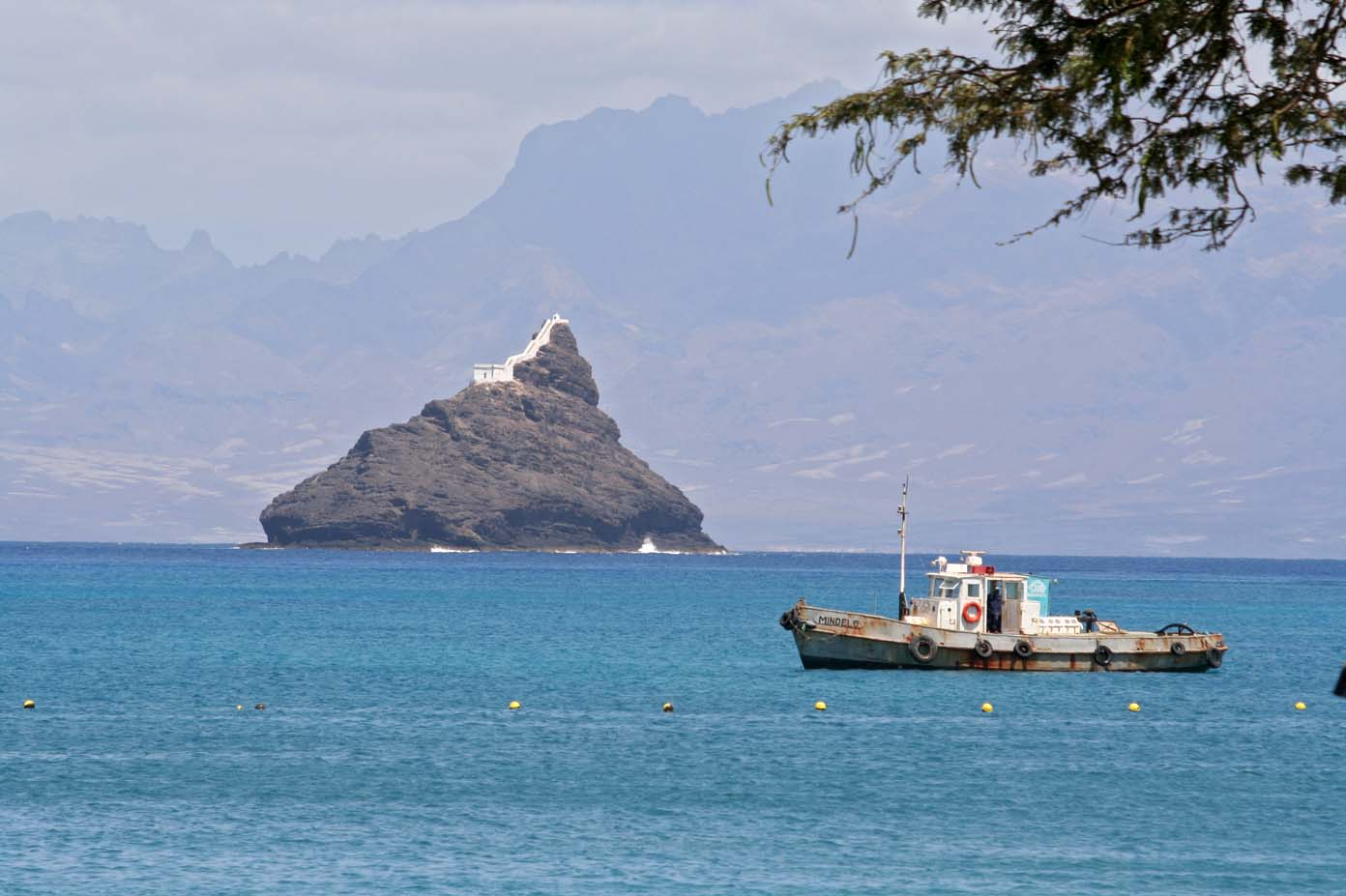
- Ilheu dos Pássaros in front of Santo Antão

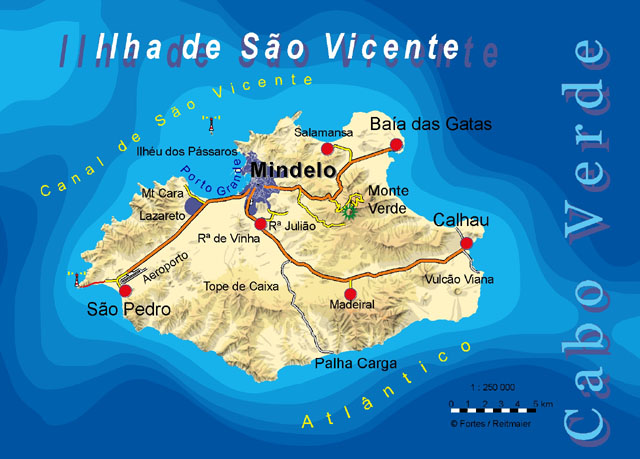

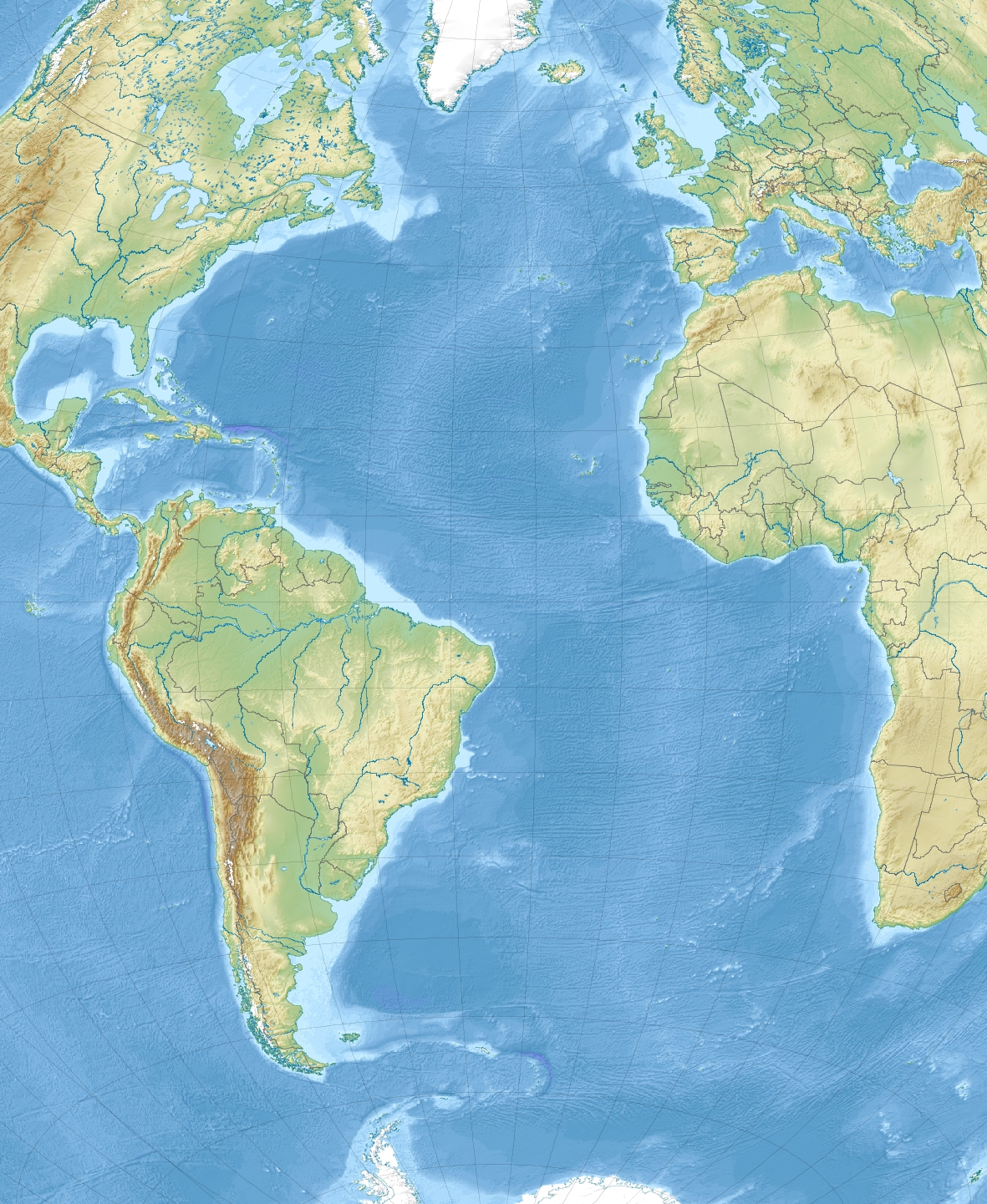
- Location within Cape Verde Location within Atlantic Ocean

Geography
- Location: Atlantic Ocean
- Coordinates: 16.910°N 25.011°W
- Area: 0.023 km^{2} (0.0089 sq mi)
- Length: 0.22 km (0.137 mi)
- Width: 0.10 km (0.062 mi)
- Highest elevation: 80 m (260 ft)

Administration
- Cape Verde
- Municipality: São Vicente

Demographics
- Population: 0

Ilhéu dos Pássaros (lit. 'Islet of the Birds') is an uninhabited rocky islet in the bay of Mindelo, São Vicente Island, Cape Verde.

== Geography ==
The island is at the outer edge of Porto Grande Bay, representing a division between the bay and the Canal de São Vicente, the channel of the Atlantic Ocean that separates the islands of São Vicente and Santo Antão. It lies about 1.3 km (0.8 mi) west of the headland Ponta João Ribeiro, and 3.5 km (2.2 mi) northwest of Mindelo city centre. There is an active lighthouse on the islet.

The island is roughly conical in shape, with steep sides. It is approximately 80 metres (260 ft) tall at its peak, with the lighthouse extending higher.

== In culture ==
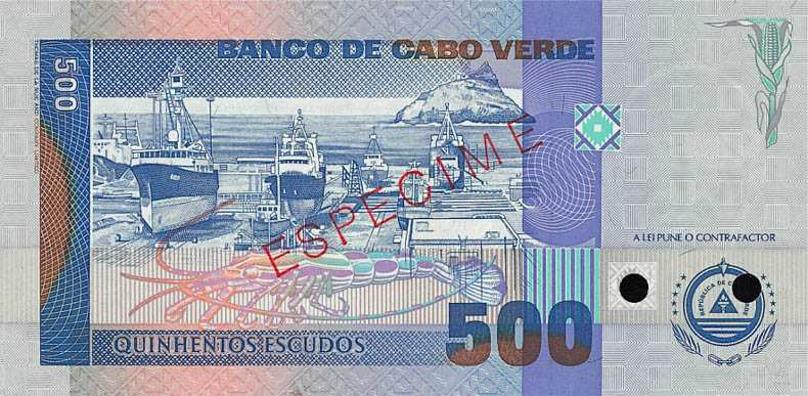
Porto Grande Bay, the Port of Mindelo and Ilhéu dos Passaros issued between 1992 and 2000

Ilhéu dos Pássaros was depicted on a Cape Verdean $500 escudo bill issued between 1992 and 2000.

The Cape Verdean author Orlanda Amarílis published Ilhéu dos Pássaros, a collection of short stories, in 1983. The stories reflect the prominence of emigration and a diaspora as motifs within Cape Verdean identity, with the islet defining the boundary between the home bay and the open ocean.
