= Ponta João d'Évora =

Headland in São Vicente, Cape Verde

- Headland
- Location within Cape Verde
- Coordinates: 16°55′20″N 24°57′42″W
- Location: Northern São Vicente, Cape Verde
- Water bodies: Atlantic Ocean

Ponta João d'Évora is a headland on the north coast of the island of São Vicente. It is located about 5 km northeast of Mindelo city centre and 3 km northwest of Salamansa.

== See also ==
- Geography of Cape Verde
