= Viana, Cape Verde =

Mountain in Cape Verde

Viana
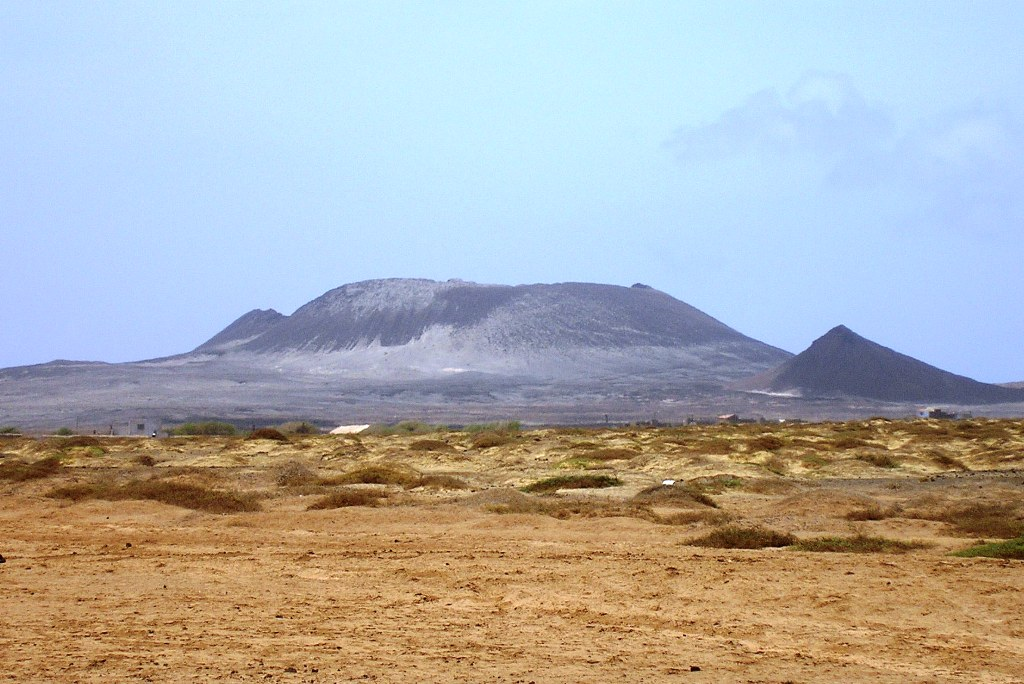
- Monte Viana

Highest point
- Elevation: 163 m (535 ft)
- Coordinates: 16°49′33″N 24°52′33″W

Geography
- Location within Cape Verde
- Location: southeastern São Vicente island, Cape Verde

Viana is a low volcano in the southeastern part of the island of São Vicente, Cape Verde. Its elevation is 163 metres (535 ft). It is situated 3 kilometres (2 mi) south of Calhau and 14 kilometres (9 mi) southeast of the island capital Mindelo.

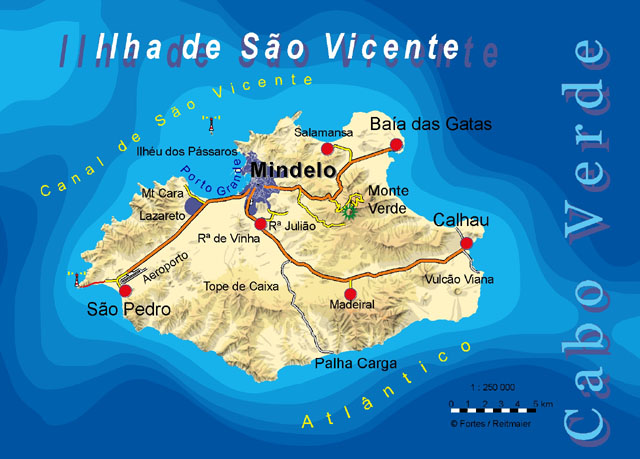
The Viana volcano shown on the bottom right of the map

== See also ==
- List of mountains in Cape Verde
