= Morro Branco, Cape Verde =

Morro Branco
- Location within Cape Verde

Highest point
- Elevation: 86 m (282 ft)
- Coordinates: 16°53′01″N 25°01′33″W

Geography
- Location: Western São Vicente, Cape Verde

Morro Branco is a low mountain in the northwest of the island of São Vicente. Its elevation is 86 m. It stands at the western end of the Porto Grande Bay, 4 km west of the city centre of Mindelo. In the 1920s military installations were built on the mountain.

== See also ==
- Geography of Cape Verde
