= Fernando Calhau =

Portuguese artist

Fernando Calhau (1948-2002) was a Portuguese artist.

Born in Lisbon, he finished a degree in painting at ESBAL (Escola Superior de Belas Artes de Lisboa/ the Lisbon School of Fine Arts) in 1973. In the same year he moved to London with a scholarship from the Calouste Gulbenkian Foundation. He completed his studies in the field of engraving with Bartolomeu Cid dos Santos at the Slade School of Fine Art.

Fernando Calhau's art comprises a wide range of pieces of work: drawing, engraving, painting, sculpture, photography and film.
