= Ribeira Seca =

Ribeira Seca may refer to:

Azores, Portugal

- Ribeira Seca (Calheta), a civil parish in the municipality of Calheta, São Jorge
- Ribeira Seca (Ribeira Grande), a civil parish in the municipality of Ribeira Grande, São Miguel
- Ribeira Seca (Vila Franca do Campo), a civil parish in the municipality of Vila Franca do Campo, São Miguel

Cape Verde

- Ribeira Seca (Santiago), a stream on the island of Santiago
