= Ribeira de Calhau =

- Settlement
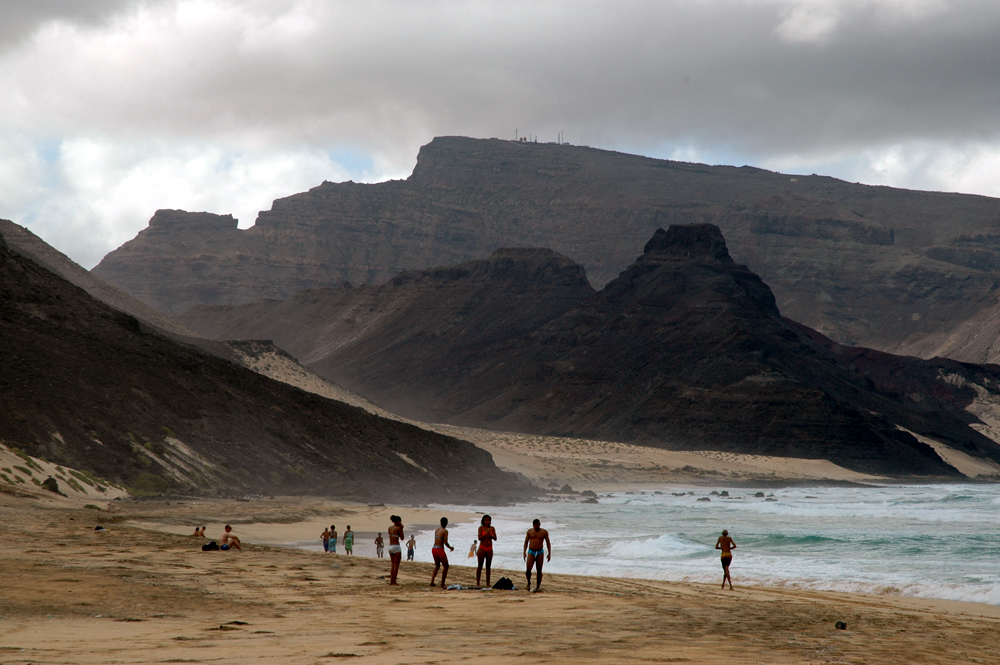
- Beach of Calhau

- Location within Cape Verde
- Coordinates: 16.841°N 24.901°W
- Country: Cape Verde
- Island: São Vicente
- Municipality: São Vicente
- Civil parish: Nossa Senhora da Luz
- Elevation: 7 m (23 ft)

Population (2010)
  - Total: 1,177
- ID: 21105

Ribeira de Calhau is a settlement in the eastern part of the island of Sao Vicente, Cape Verde. It takes its name from the river Ribeira do Calhau, and comprises the villages of Madeiral, Ribeira de Calhau and Calhau. Madeiral and Ribeira de Calhau are located in the river valley, Calhau is on the east coast. In 2010, its population was 1,177. The valley is surrounded by the mountains Viana, Madeiral, Pico do Vento and Monte Verde.

The Cape Verde Atmospheric Observatory "Humberto Duarte Fonseca" is situated 1 km north of Calhau. It is part of a German-UK initiative to undertake long-term ground- and ocean-based observations in the tropical Eastern North Atlantic Ocean region.

== Climate ==
Calhau has a hot desert climate like most of the island. The average annual temperature is 22.6 °C. Average rainfall is 129 millimeters.

Climate data for Calhau, 86 metres ASL
Month	Jan	Feb	Mar	Apr	May	Jun	Jul	Aug	Sep	Oct	Nov	Dec	Year
Mean daily maximum °C (°F)	23.0 (73.4)	22.4 (72.3)	23.2 (73.8)	23.7 (74.7)	24.1 (75.4)	25.2 (77.4)	26.7 (80.1)	26.9 (80.4)	26.3 (79.3)	25.8 (78.4)	25.8 (78.4)	24.1 (75.4)	24.8 (76.6)
Daily mean °C (°F)	20.8 (69.4)	20.5 (68.9)	20.9 (69.6)	21.3 (70.3)	21.7 (71.1)	23.0 (73.4)	24.1 (75.4)	24.7 (76.5)	24.7 (76.5)	24.3 (75.7)	23.6 (74.5)	22.1 (71.8)	22.6 (72.7)
Mean daily minimum °C (°F)	18.7 (65.7)	18.6 (65.5)	18.7 (65.7)	18.9 (66.0)	19.4 (66.9)	20.8 (69.4)	21.5 (70.7)	22.6 (72.7)	23.2 (73.8)	22.8 (73.0)	21.5 (70.7)	20.2 (68.4)	20.6 (69.1)
Average precipitation mm (inches)	5 (0.2)	1 (0.0)	1 (0.0)	0 (0)	0 (0)	0 (0)	4 (0.2)	19 (0.7)	67 (2.6)	17 (0.7)	10 (0.4)	5 (0.2)	129 (5.1)

== Notable person ==
- Vasco Martins, singer and composer
