= Ribeira Julião =

- Settlement
- Coordinates: 16.855°N 24.987°W
- Country: Cape Verde
- Island: São Vicente
- Municipality: São Vicente
- Civil parish: Nossa Senhora da Luz

Population (2010)
  - Total: 611
- ID: 21103

Ribeira Julião is a village in the central part of the island of Sao Vicente, Cape Verde. In 2010 its population was 611. It is situated in the valley of the stream Ribeira de Julião, south of the island capital Mindelo, 3.5 km from the city centre. An adjacent neighbourhood of Mindelo is named Ribeira de Julião (population 1,247 at the 2010 census).
