= Palmeira, Cape Verde =

Palmeira
- Settlement
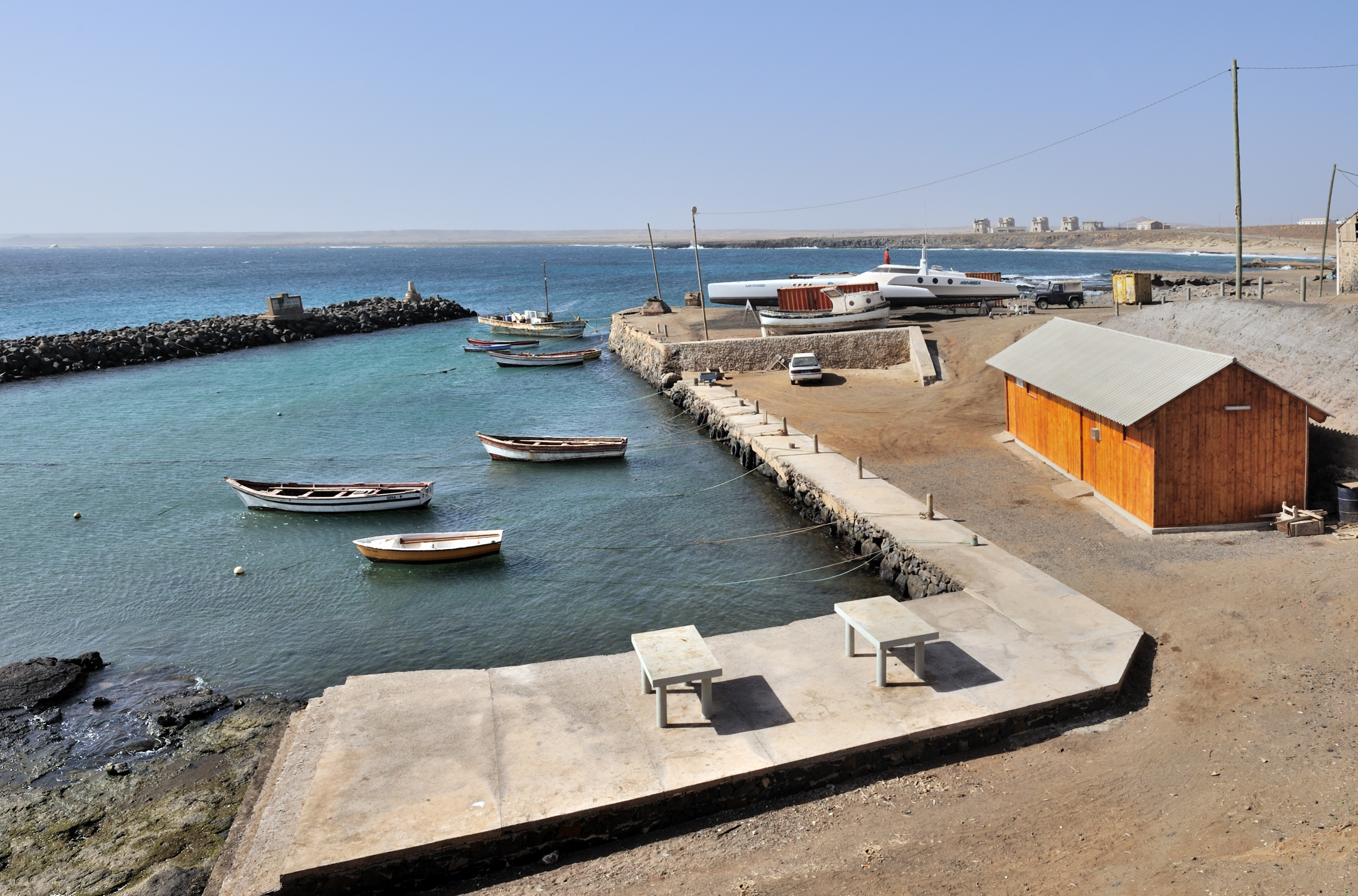
- The Port of Palmeira, one of three of the island's ports

- Location within Cape Verde
- Coordinates: 16.758°N 22.982°W
- Country: Cape Verde
- Island: Sal
- Municipality: Sal
- Civil parish: Nossa Senhora das Dores
- Elevation: 6 m (20 ft)

Population (2010)
  - Total: 1,420
- ID: 41101

Palmeira is a town in the northwestern part of the island of Sal, Cape Verde. In 2010 its population was 1,420. The town is situated on the west coast, about 4 km west of the island capital Espargos. Located at Baía de Palmeira, a small bay south of the village, it is home to the main port of the island of Sal. It is the third busiest port of Cape Verde in freight traffic. Port da Palmeira is a member port of the International Association of Ports and Harbors (IAPH).

== History ==
A small settlement at the location of present Palmeira was observed by an English captain in 1720. It was mentioned as "Palmera" in the 1747 map by Jacques-Nicolas Bellin.
