= Ribeira do Amparo =

Coordinates: 11°02′49″S 38°25′58″W

- Municipality
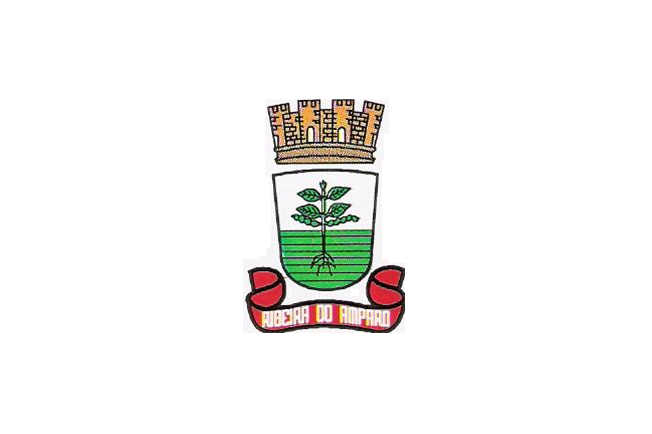
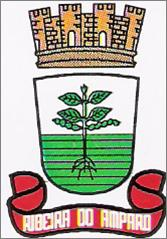
- Flag Coat of arms
- Interactive map of Ribeira do Amparo
- Country: Brazil
- Region: Nordeste
- State: Bahia

Population (2020)
  - Total: 14,612
- Time zone: UTC−3 (BRT)

Ribeira do Amparo is a municipality in the state of Bahia in the North-East region of Brazil.

== See also ==
- List of municipalities in Bahia
