= Porto Grande Bay =

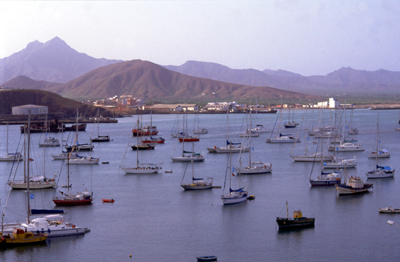
- Interactive map of Porto Grande Bay
- Location within Cape Verde

Location
- Country: Cape Verde
- Location: Mindelo, São Vicente
- Coordinates: 16°53′N 25°01′W

Details
- Opened: 18th century
- Owned by: ENAPOR
- Type of Harbor: Natural/Artificial
- No. of wharfs: 9

Statistics
- Annual cargo tonnage: 847,602 metric tonnes (2017)
- Annual container volume: 195,485 metric tonnes (2017)
- Passenger traffic: 350,213 (2017)

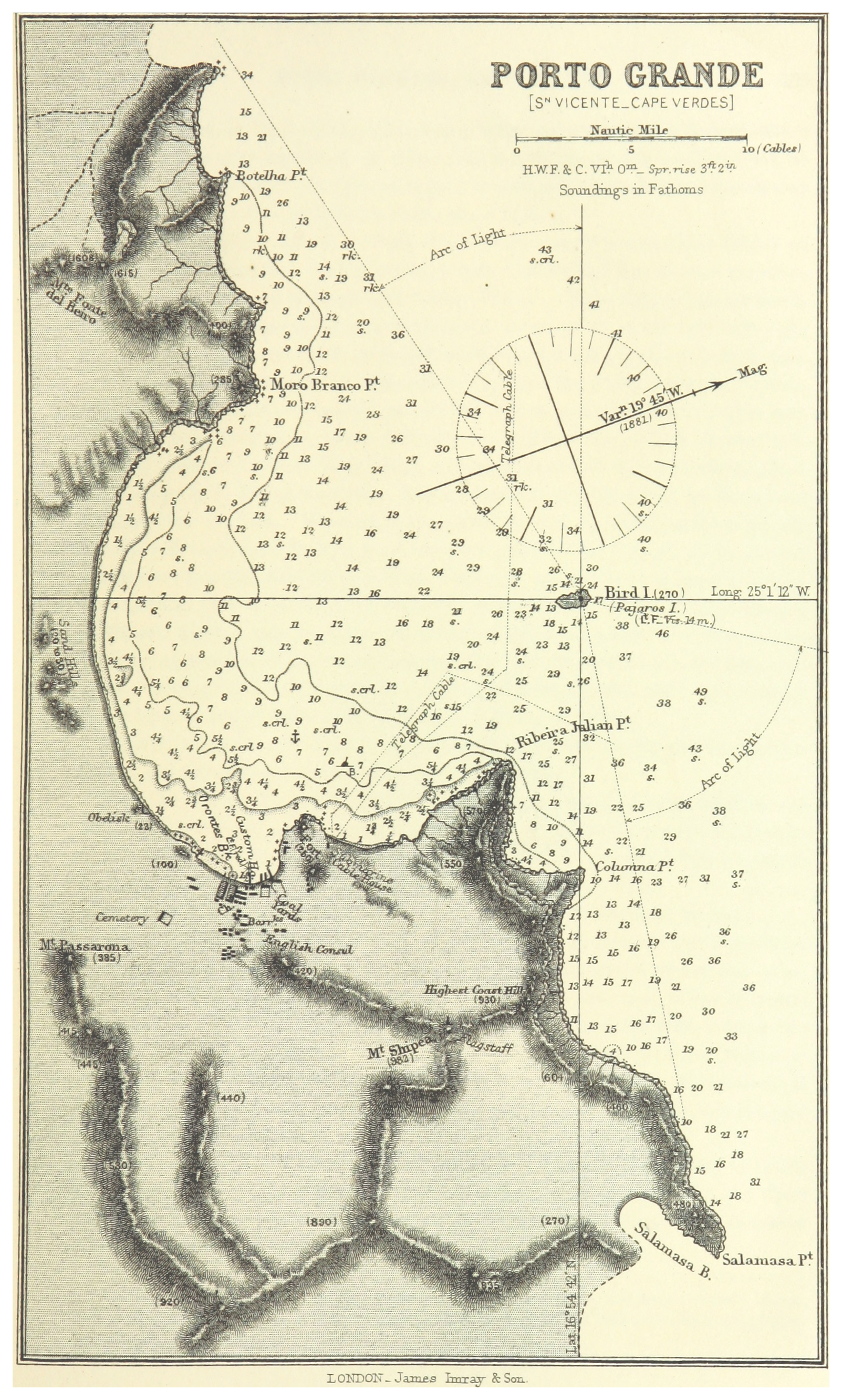
1884 nautical chart of Porto Grande Bay

Porto Grande Bay (Portuguese: Baía do Porto Grande), also Mindelo Bay, is a bay on the north coast of the island of São Vicente, Cape Verde. The main city of São Vicente, Mindelo, is situated at the bay. The Porto Grande Bay is a natural harbour. It stretches between the headlands Ponta João Ribeiro in the northeast and Ponta do Morro Branco in the west. To the northwest it opens towards the Canal de São Vicente, the channel between the islands São Vicente and Santo Antão. The small rocky islet Ilhéu dos Pássaros lies north of the bay.

== Port facilities ==
The port is owned and operated by ENAPOR, the Cape Verdean port authority. Since the latest modernization in 2014, the port has 4 long quays, 4 shorter quays, a quay for fishing boats with fish processing installations, a container terminal (expanded and modernized in 1997), 2 roll-on/roll-off ramps and 3 passenger terminals. The total length of the quays is 1,560 m, and the maximum depth is 12 m. With 847,602 metric tonnes of cargo and 350,213 passengers handled (2017), it is the busiest port of Cape Verde. There are ferry services to the islands of Santo Antão, São Nicolau, Santiago and Sal. Porto Grande is a member port of the International Association of Ports and Harbors (IAPH).

== Gallery ==
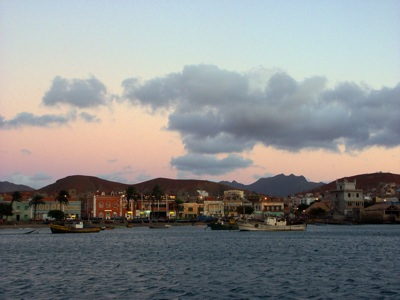
The Harbor of Mindelo facing Monte Verde

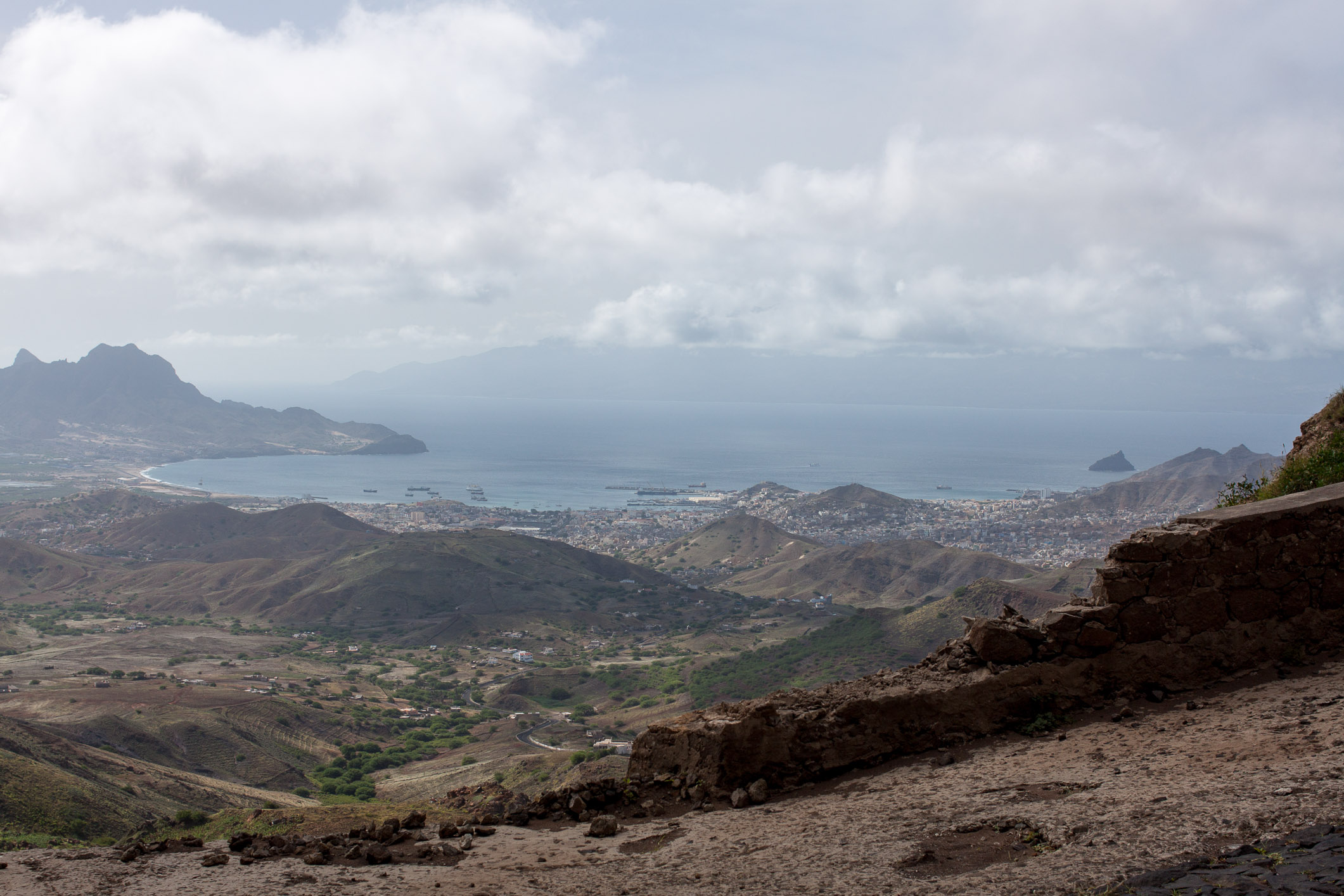
The city of Mindelo with a view of its bay

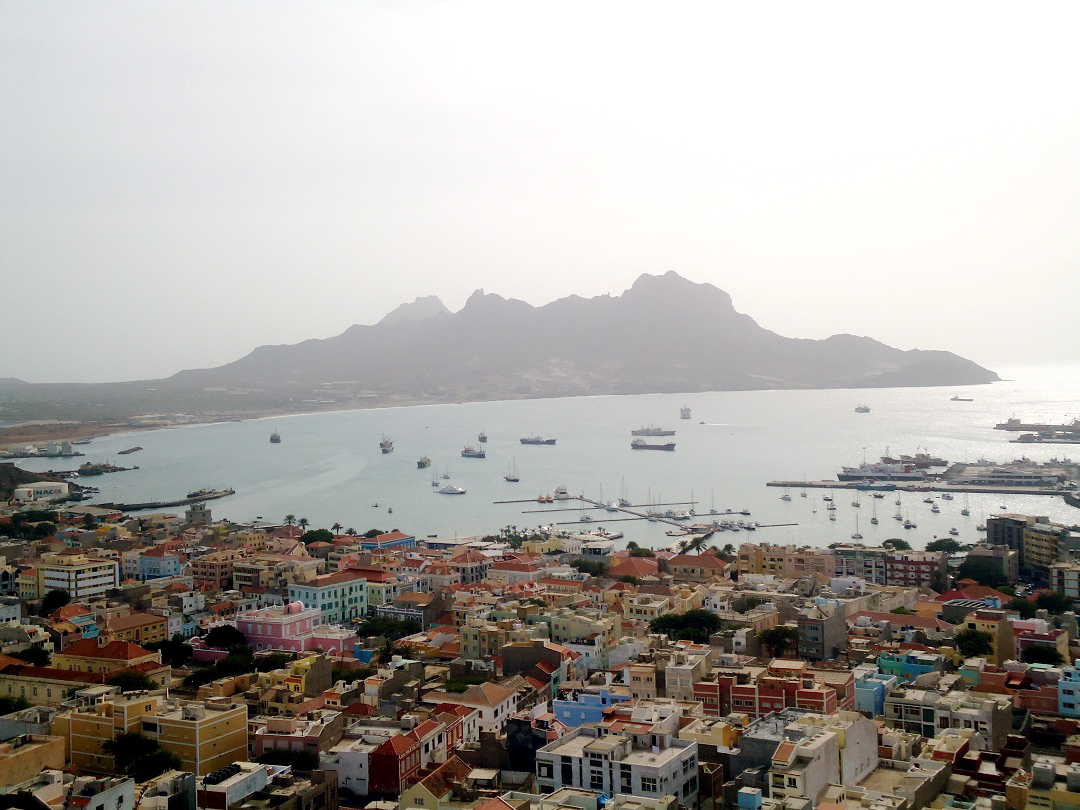
Porto Grande Bay with Monte Cara

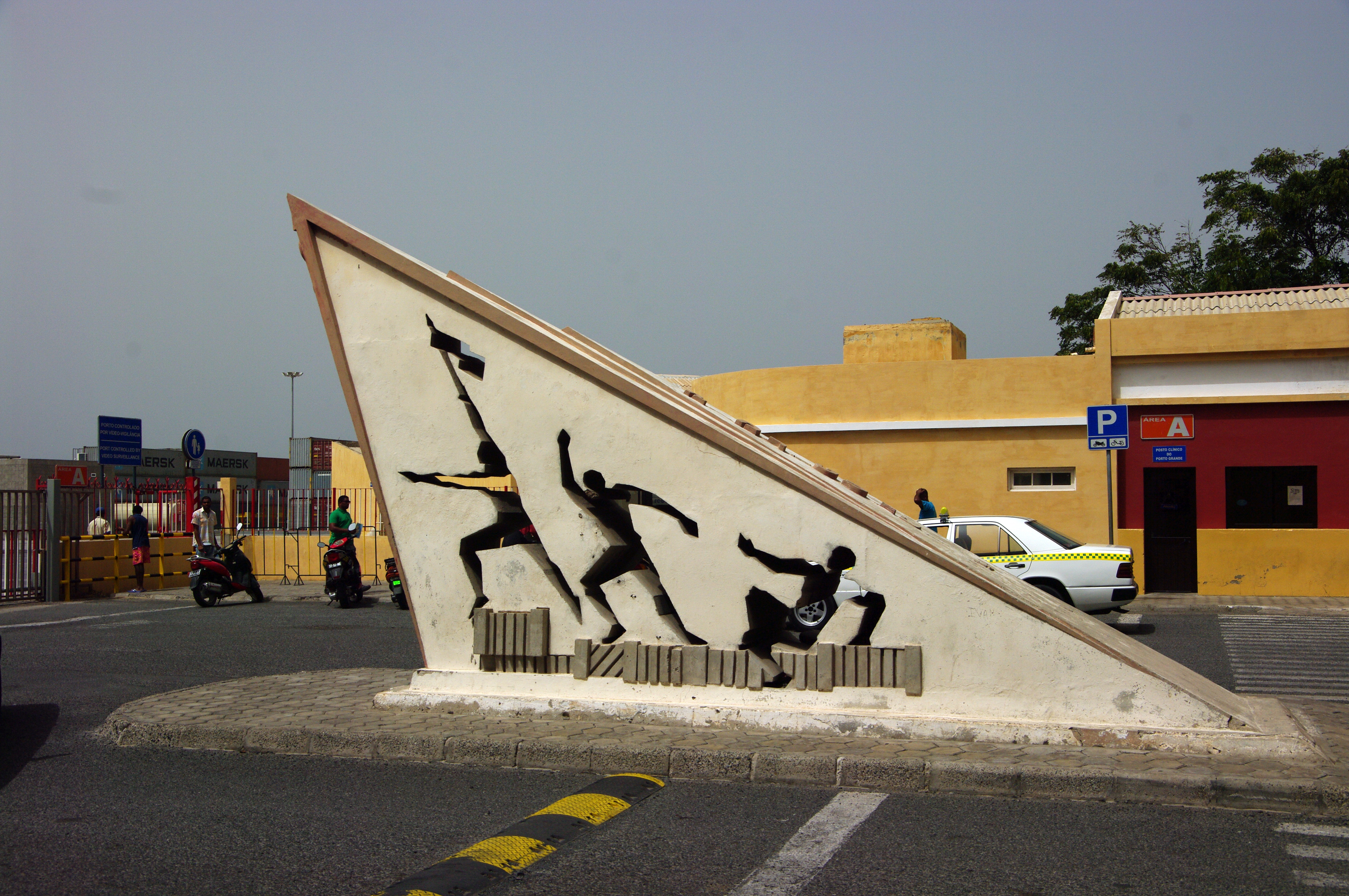
A monument located at the port's entrance west of Fortinho
