= Lameirão =

Village in Cape Verde

- Settlement
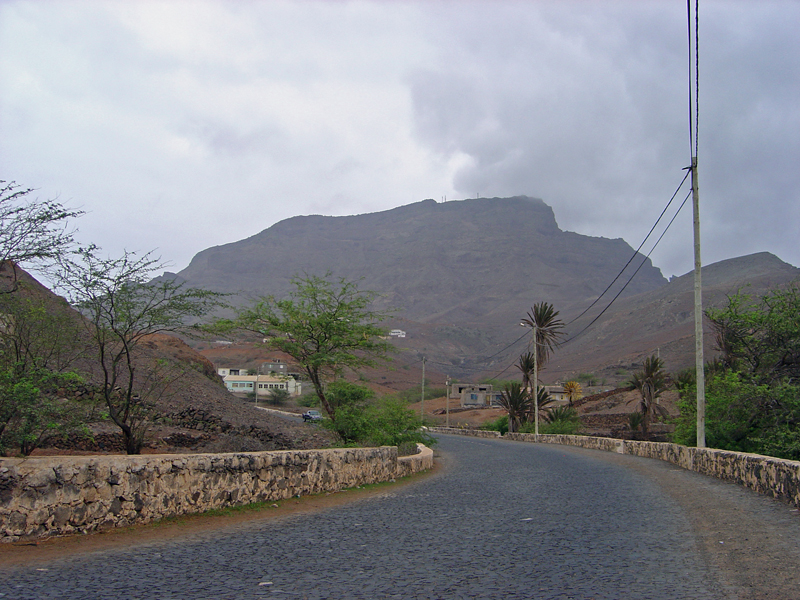
- Lameirão and Monte Verde

- Location within Cape Verde
- Coordinates: 16.879°N 24.961°W
- Country: Cape Verde
- Island: São Vicente
- Municipality: São Vicente
- Civil parish: Nossa Senhora da Luz

Population (2010)
  - Total: 319
- ID: 21102

Lameirão is a village in the northern part of the island of Sao Vicente, Cape Verde. It is situated in the hills east of the island capital Mindelo, approximately 3 km southeast of the city centre and west of Monte Verde.
