= Ribeira de Julião =

Location
- Country: Cape Verde

Physical characteristics
- Source
  - location: São Vicente
- Mouth
  - location: Porto Grande Bay
  - coordinates: 16.877°N 24.998°W

Ribeira de Julião is a seasonal stream in the central part of the island of São Vicente in Cape Verde. Its source is in the hills southeast of the island capital Mindelo, and it empties into the Porto Grande Bay, a bay of the Atlantic Ocean, southwest of Mindelo. The village Ribeira Julião and the Mindelo neighbourhood Ribeira de Julião take their name from this stream.

== See also ==
- List of streams in Cape Verde
