= Canal de São Vicente =

Atlantic Ocean strait between Santo Antão and São Vicente, Cape Verde

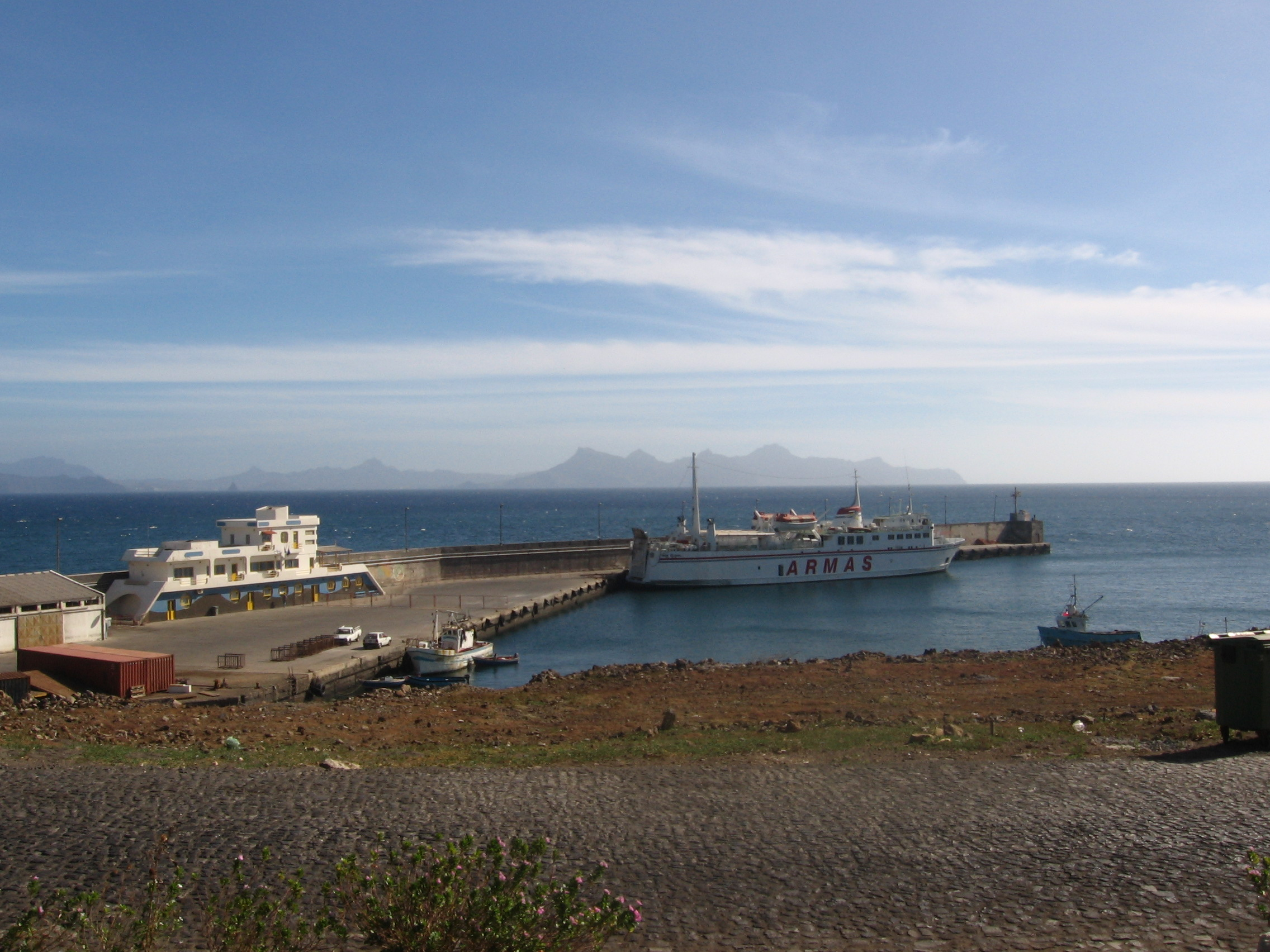
- Canal de São Vicente seen from Santo Antão's Porto Novo

- Location in Cape Verde
- Coordinates: 16°56′N 25°5′W
- Ocean/sea sources: Atlantic Ocean
- Basin countries: Cape Verde
- Max. length: 25 km (16 mi)
- Max. width: 11 km (7 mi)
- Islands: Ilhéu dos Pássaros
- Settlements: Porto Novo, Santo Antåo Island

The Canal de São Vicente is a strait of the Atlantic Ocean separating the islands of Santo Antão and São Vicente, Cape Verde. At its narrowest point, it is 11 km (7 mi) wide. The ferry route between the ports of Porto Novo on Santo Antão and Mindelo on São Vicente crosses the canal. The channel begins in São Vicente's northwesternmost cape near Monte Cara up to the headland Ponta de João d'Évora in the northeast.

The Canal de São Vicente is the habitat of some endemic species, including the demosponge Amphilectus strepsichelifer and the cone snail Conus fernandesi.
