= Baía das Gatas =

- Settlement
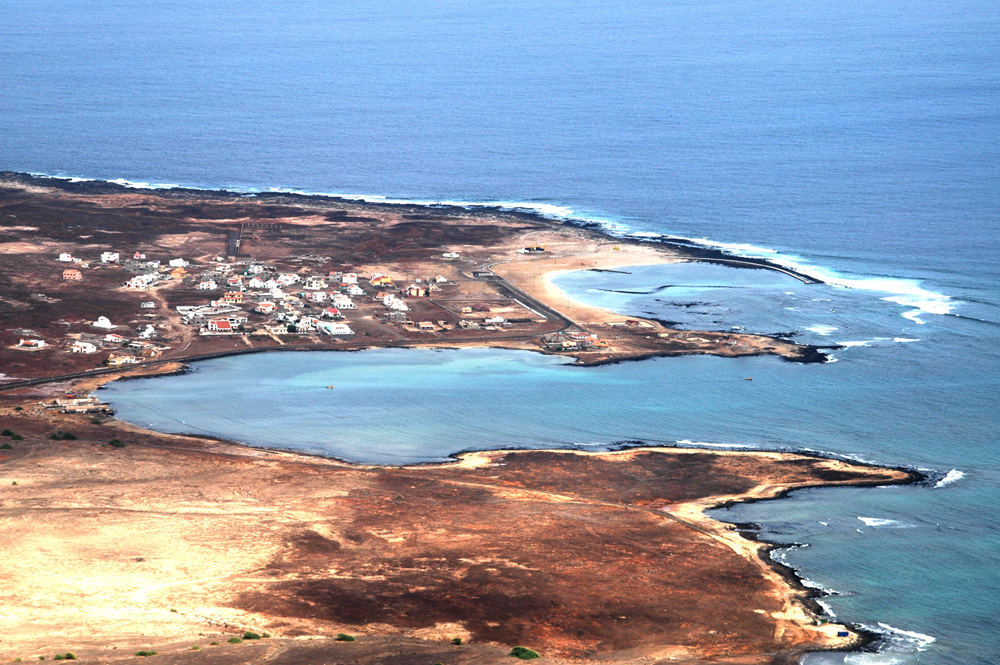

- Location within Cape Verde
- Coordinates: 16.903°N 24.910°W
- Country: Cape Verde
- Island: São Vicente
- Municipality: São Vicente
- Civil parish: Nossa Senhora da Luz
- Elevation: 6 m (20 ft)

Population (2010)
  - Total: 162
- ID: 2110601

Baía das Gatas is a village in the northeastern part of the island of Sao Vicente, Cape Verde. It is situated on the east coast, 4 km east of Salamansa and 8 km east of the island capital Mindelo. It takes its name from the bay it is situated on, also named Baía das Gatas. The bay, island and entire archipelago was discovered by the Portuguese navigator Diogo Afonso in 1462. During that voyage he made a map where he was the first to mention not only Sao Vicente, Baia das Gatas but also the Portuguese Madeira Island, as well as the Cape Verdean islands of Brava, Sao Nicolau, Santo Antao and the islets of Branco and Razo.

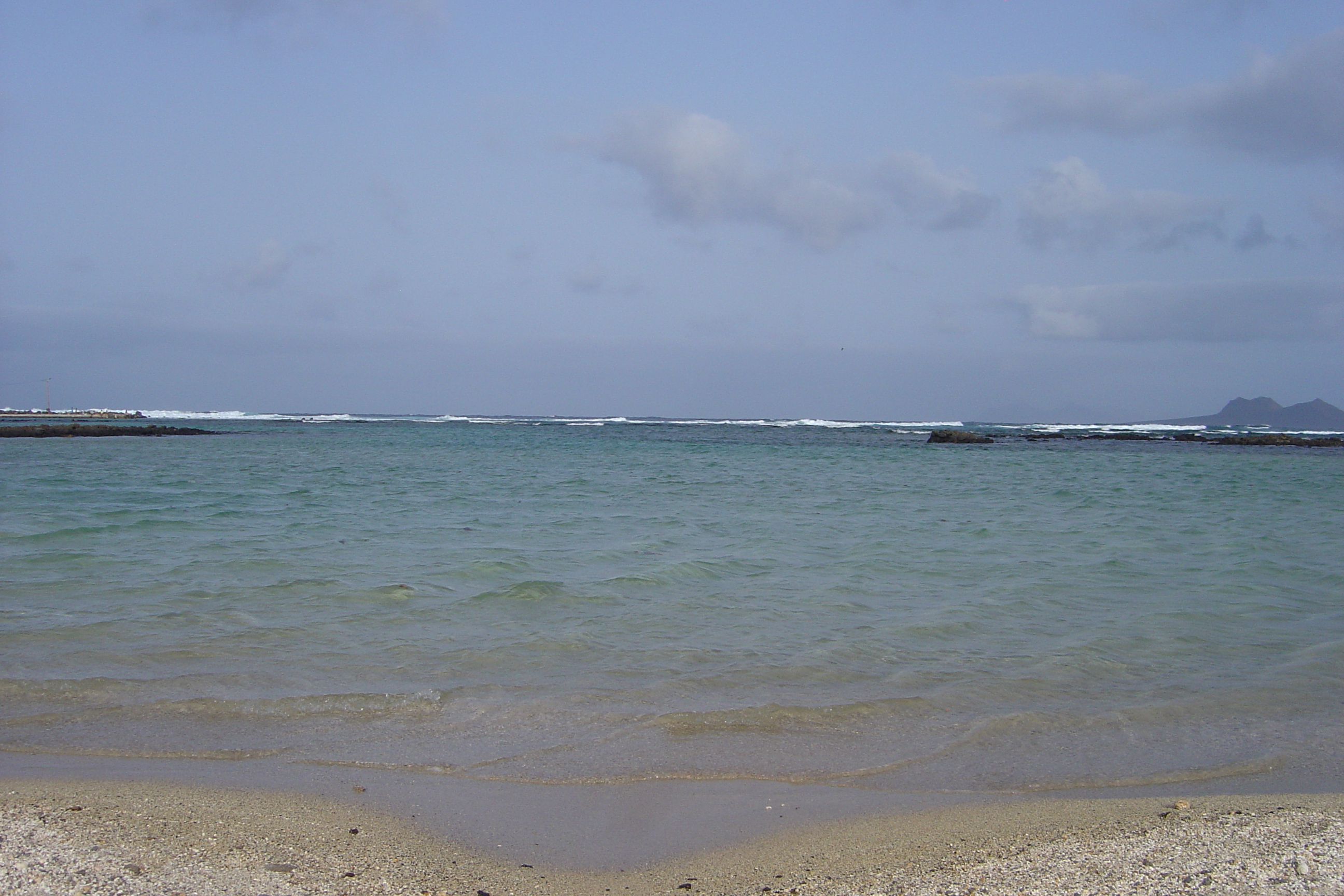
Beach of Baía das Gatas, São Vicente, Cabo Verde

== Music festival ==
Since 1984, the Festival de Música da Baía das Gatas is held every year in a full moon weekend in August on the beach of Baía das Gatas. It features local and international music.
