= Ribeira do Calhau =

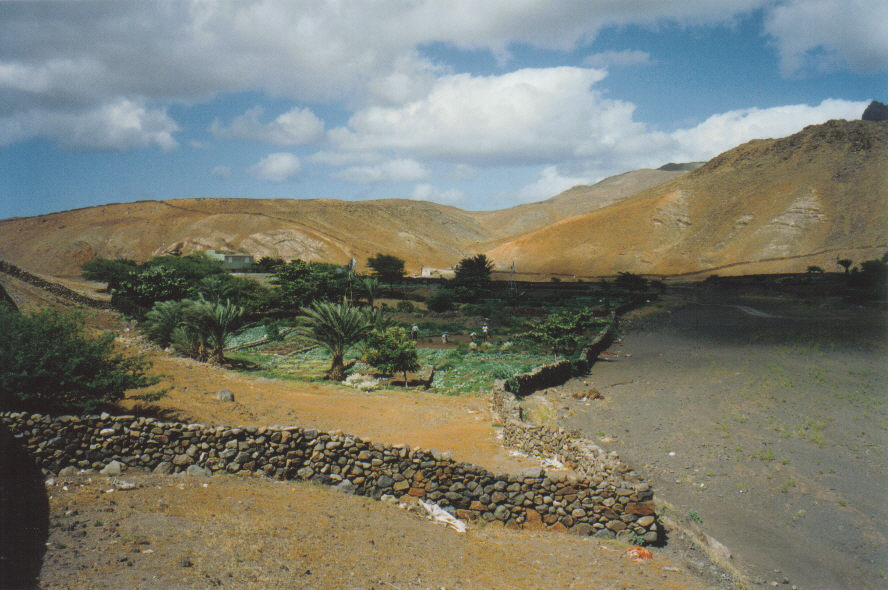
- Vale de Calhau

Location
- Country: Cape Verde

Physical characteristics
- Source
  - location: São Vicente
- Mouth
  - location: Atlantic Ocean
  - coordinates: 16.8471°N 24.8677°W

Ribeira do Calhau is a stream in the eastern part of the island of São Vicente in Cape Verde. It begins in the hills southeast of the island capital Mindelo, flows towards the east and empties into the Atlantic Ocean, at the village Calhau. The settlement Ribeira de Calhau, which comprises the villages Madeiral, Ribeira de Calhau and Calhau, takes its name from this stream.

== See also ==
- List of streams in Cape Verde
