= International Association of Ports and Harbors =

- Abbreviation: IAPH
- Formation: 1955
- Type: NPO & NGO
- Legal status: Active
- Location: Tokyo, Japan
- Region served: World
- Website: iaphworldports.org

The International Association of Ports and Harbors (IAPH) is the global trade association for seaports worldwide.

It is headquartered in Tokyo, Japan. Formed in 1955, it is now recognised as the NGO representing ports worldwide. With over 200 ports in membership, as well as numerous national port representative bodies, it now has consultative status with 5 UN agencies, including UNCTAD and the IMO.

== Structure ==
=== Membership ===
The IAPH membership is divided into 3 regions: African/European, American and Asian/Oceanian.

=== Secretariat ===
The Secretariat is based in Tokyo and is headed by a Secretary General who is appointed by the Board of Directors.
