= São Vicente, Cape Verde =

Island in Cape Verde

São Vicente
Native name: Sonsent Nickname: Ilha do Porto Grande (island of Porto Grande)
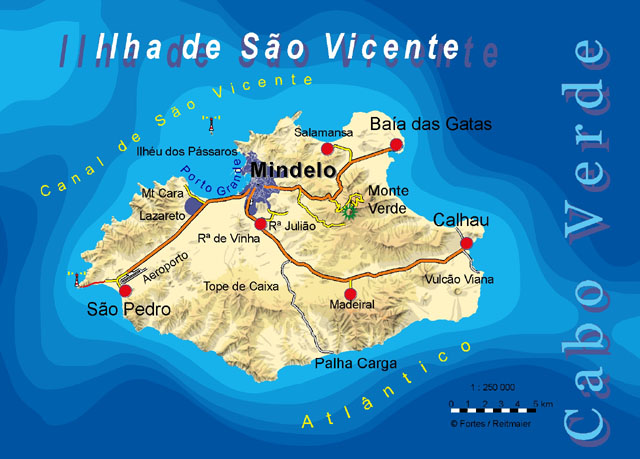

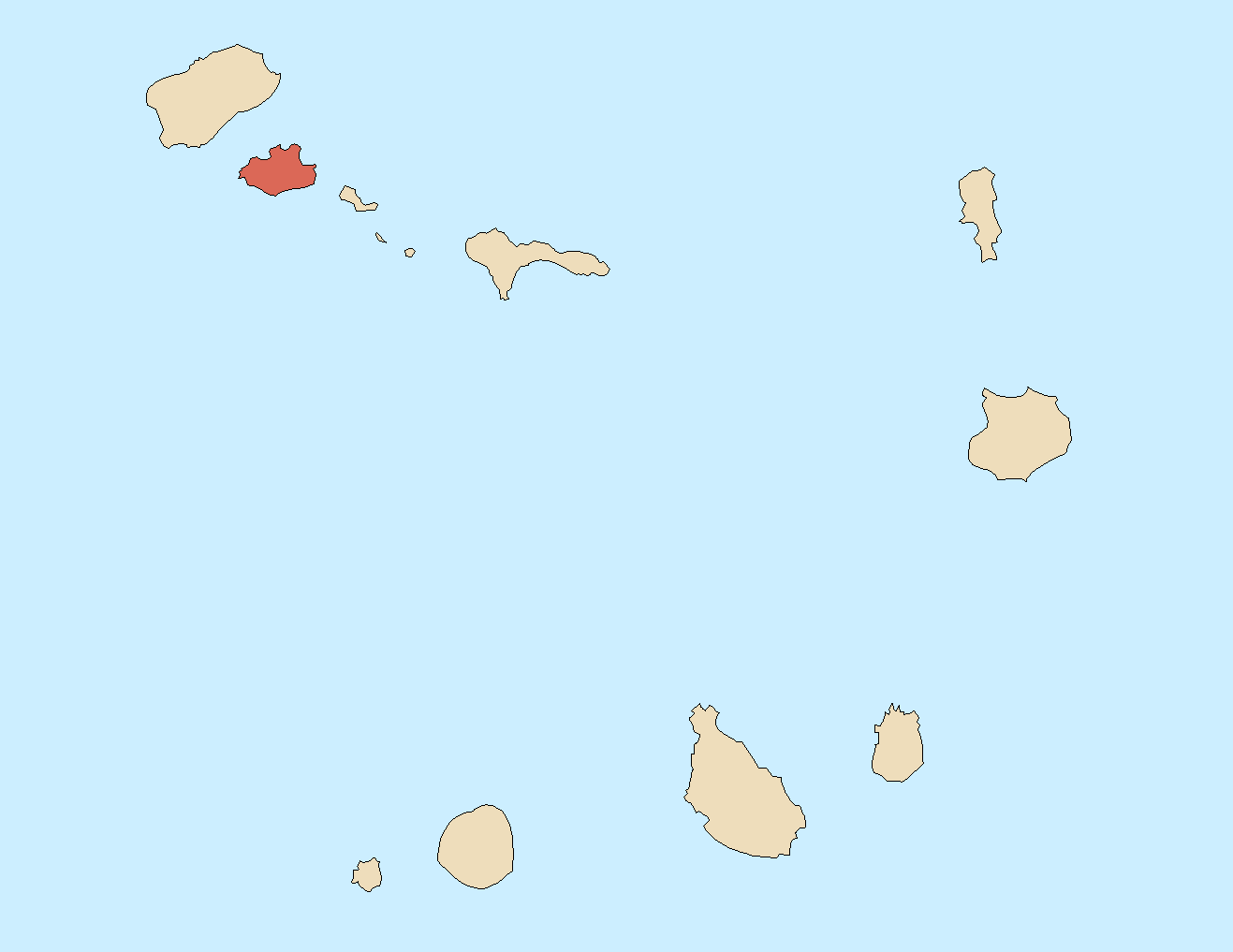

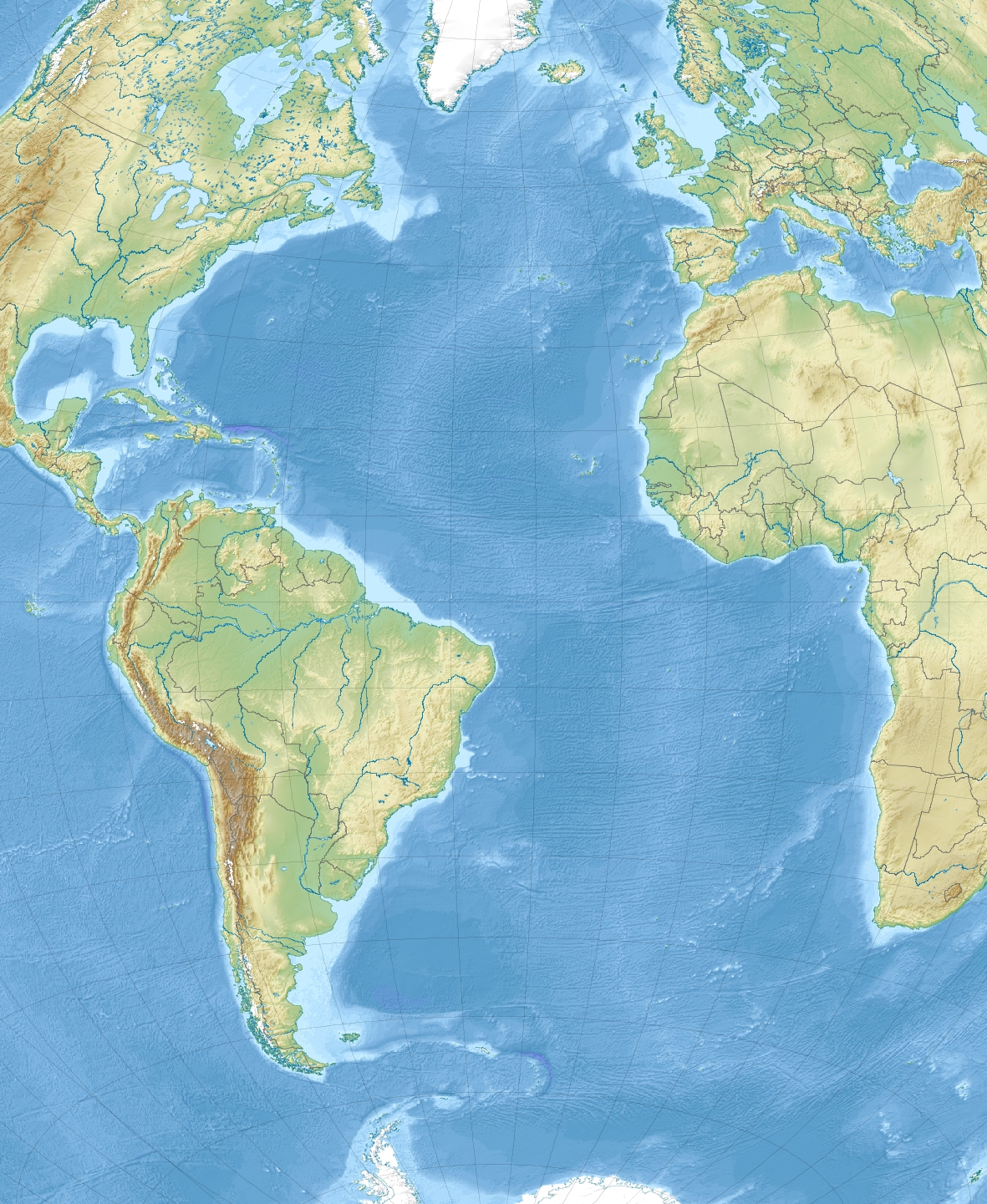
- Location within Cape Verde Location within Atlantic Ocean

Geography
- Location: Atlantic Ocean
- Coordinates: 16°51′N 24°58′W
- Area: 226.7 km^{2} (87.5 sq mi)
- Length: 24.3 km (15.1 mi)
- Width: 16.3 km (10.13 mi)
- Highest elevation: 744 m (2441 ft)
- Highest point: Monte Verde

Administration
- Cape Verde
- Municipality: São Vicente
- Largest settlement: Mindelo

Demographics
- Population: 81,014 (2015)
- Pop. density: 357/km^{2} (925/sq mi)

Additional information
- Official website: www.cmsv.cv

São Vicente (Portuguese for "Saint Vincent"; Cape Verdean Creole: Sanvisenti) is one of the Barlavento Islands, the northern group within the Cape Verde archipelago in the Atlantic Ocean, off the West African coast. It is located between the islands of Santo Antão and Santa Luzia, with the Canal de São Vicente separating it from Santo Antão.

== Geography ==
The island is roughly rectangular in shape with an area of 226.7 square kilometres (87.5 square miles). From east to west it measures 24.3 kilometres (15.1 miles) and from north to south 16.3 kilometres (10.1 miles). The island, of volcanic origin, is fairly flat. The last volcanic activity is considered to have taken place in the Pleistocene. Although very eroded, some craters still remain, for instance Viana. Its highest point is Monte Verde, located in the eastern part with an altitude of 744 metres (2,441 feet). Other mountains include Madeiral (680 m), Caixa (535 m) and Monte Cara (490 m).

92.6% of the island population lives in the urban area of Mindelo, on the Porto Grande Bay, a caldera that is breached by the ocean. A small islet, Ilhéu dos Pássaros, is less than one nautical mile off the coast of Porto Grande Bay. There are a few intermittent streams, including Ribeira do Calhau and Ribeira de Julião.

=== Climate ===
São Vicente has a hot desert climate (Köppen BWh). The average annual temperature in Mindelo is 23.6 °C (74.5 °F). The island is very dry with only 127 mm (5 in) annual precipitation in Mindelo. Only the higher area of Monte Verde receives more precipitation.

Climate data for Mindelo (1981-2010)
Month	Jan	Feb	Mar	Apr	May	Jun	Jul	Aug	Sep	Oct	Nov	Dec	Year
Record high °C (°F)	29.2 (84.6)	29.5 (85.1)	30.3 (86.5)	29.5 (85.1)	31.5 (88.7)	30.5 (86.9)	33.6 (92.5)	31.8 (89.2)	32.7 (90.9)	31.5 (88.7)	31.0 (87.8)	30.0 (86.0)	33.6 (92.5)
Mean daily maximum °C (°F)	23.4 (74.1)	23.2 (73.8)	23.9 (75.0)	24.0 (75.2)	24.9 (76.8)	25.4 (77.7)	27.1 (80.8)	28.3 (82.9)	28.8 (83.8)	28.0 (82.4)	26.8 (80.2)	25.2 (77.4)	25.7 (78.3)
Daily mean °C (°F)	21.9 (71.4)	21.6 (70.9)	22.0 (71.6)	22.2 (72.0)	22.8 (73.0)	23.8 (74.8)	25.0 (77.0)	26.2 (79.2)	26.5 (79.7)	26.0 (78.8)	25.0 (77.0)	23.3 (73.9)	23.9 (75.0)
Mean daily minimum °C (°F)	19.9 (67.8)	19.7 (67.5)	19.6 (67.3)	20.2 (68.4)	20.9 (69.6)	21.9 (71.4)	22.9 (73.2)	24.1 (75.4)	24.8 (76.6)	24.2 (75.6)	23.2 (73.8)	21.7 (71.1)	21.9 (71.4)
Record low °C (°F)	16.5 (61.7)	13.5 (56.3)	15.6 (60.1)	15.0 (59.0)	15.0 (59.0)	18.0 (64.4)	17.5 (63.5)	14.5 (58.1)	19.0 (66.2)	18.5 (65.3)	19.0 (66.2)	17.0 (62.6)	13.5 (56.3)
Average rainfall mm (inches)	4.8 (0.19)	1.7 (0.07)	0.4 (0.02)	0.4 (0.02)	0.0 (0.0)	0.0 (0.0)	2.6 (0.10)	16.3 (0.64)	36.2 (1.43)	14.5 (0.57)	6.3 (0.25)	1.0 (0.04)	84.2 (3.33)
Average rainy days (≥ 0.1 mm)	1	1	0	0	0	0	1	4	5	2	2	2	18
Average relative humidity (%)	66.1	67.6	67.2	68.2	70.1	72.9	72.7	74.0	74.2	72.8	69.4	67.3	70.2
Mean monthly sunshine hours	229.4	237.3	275.9	291.0	306.9	276.0	248.0	226.3	225.0	238.7	225.0	201.5	2,981
Mean daily sunshine hours	7.4	8.4	8.9	9.7	9.9	9.2	8.0	7.3	7.5	7.7	7.5	6.5	8.2
Source 1: Instituto Nacional de Meteorologia e Geofísica
Source 2: Deutscher Wetterdienst (extremes, precipitation days, and sun)

== History ==
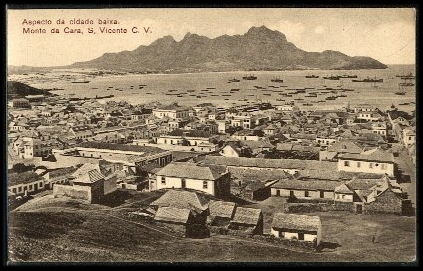
Mindelo in the early 20th century

São Vicente was discovered by the Portuguese explorer Diogo Afonso on 22 January 1462 (Saint Vincent's Day). Due to its lack of water, the island was initially used only as a cattle pasture. When the Municipality of Santo Antão was established in 1732, the island of São Vicente was part of it. At that time, it did not have permanent inhabitants. In 1793 the area of Porto Grande Bay was settled. It was only in 1838, when a coal depot was established at Porto Grande Bay to supply ships on Atlantic routes, that the population started to grow rapidly. From the beginning of the 20th century the port of Mindelo lost its importance for transatlantic navigation. Causes for this were the shift from coal to oil as fuel for ships, the rise of competing ports like Dakar and the Canary Islands and the lack of investment in port infrastructure.

== Municipality ==
Administratively, the island of São Vicente is covered by one municipality, Concelho de São Vicente. This municipality consists of one freguesia (civil parish), Nossa Senhora da Luz, which also covers the whole island. The municipal seat is the city of Mindelo.

The freguesia is subdivided into the following settlements:

- Baía das Gatas
- Lameirão
- Mindelo (city)
- Monte Verde
- Norte da Baía
- Ribeira da Vinha
- Ribeira de Calhau
- Ribeira Julião
- Salamansa
- São Pedro

=== Politics ===
Since 2004, the Movement for Democracy (MpD) is the ruling party of the municipality. The results of the latest elections, in 2016:

Party	Municipal Council		Municipal Assembly	
Party	Votes%	Seats	Votes%	Seats
MpD	48.97	9	46.75	11
UCID	28.28	0	29.72	6
PAICV	20.07	0	20.75	4

=== Presidents ===
- Henrique Teixeira de Sousa, in the 1960s
- Onésimo Silveira, in the late-1990s and the early 2000s
- Isaura Gomes 2004–2005 and 2008–2011
- Augusto Neves (since 2011)

== Population ==
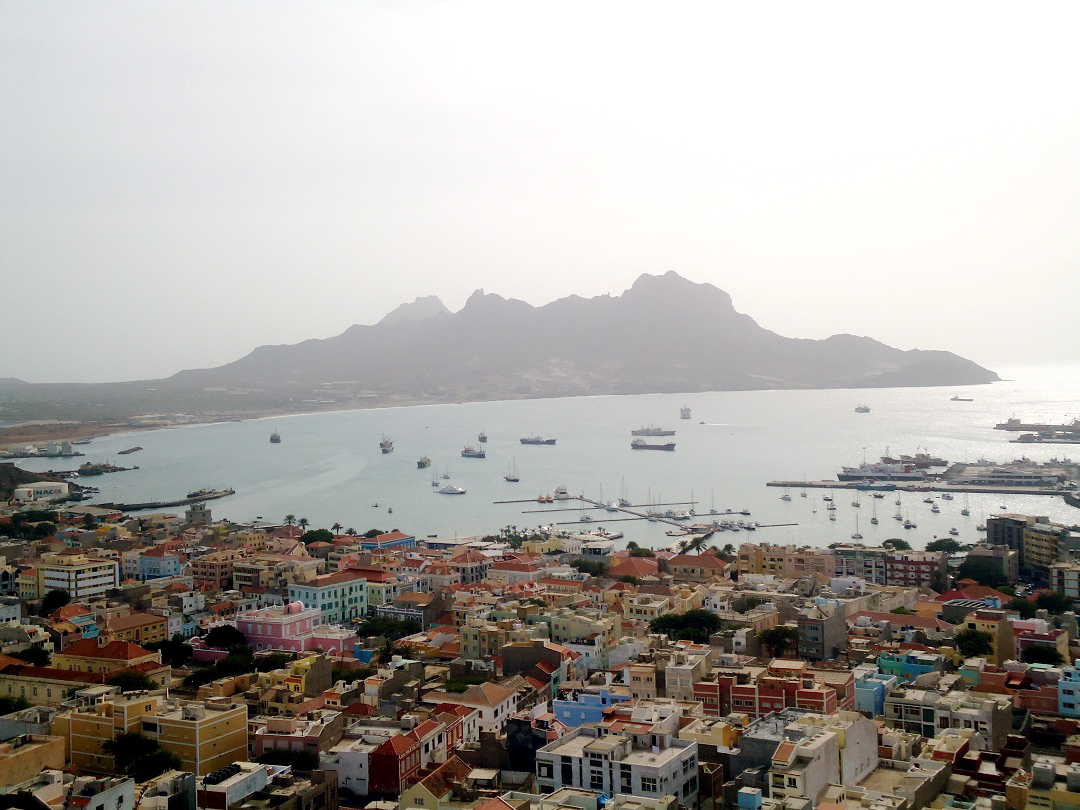
View of Downtown Mindelo, Baía do Porto Grande and Monte Cara

In the 1830s, São Vicente had an estimated population of 356. The population of São Vicente in the 2010 census was 76,140, making it the second most populous island of Cape Verde after Santiago. The annual population growth is 1.3%. 92.6% of the population live in urban areas, which is the highest proportion of all islands (average for Cape Verde: 61.8%). Life expectancy is 76 years, higher than some other parts of the world. The birth rate is 2.7% and infant mortality rate is 18 per 1000 live births (for comparison 103 in DR Congo, 55 in India, 27 in Turkey, 23 in Brazil, 16 in Russia, 4 in Finland).

The majority of the population is young; 49% of the population is under the age of 25, and 7.4% of the population is over the age of 65. The island has 19,923 households, of which there are an average of 3.8 persons per household, lower than Cape Verde's level of 4.2 persons per household. In 2010 15.1% of the households owned an automobile (Cape Verde: 12.7%).

Population of São Vicente (1940–2015)
Year	Population
1940	15,848
1950	19,576
1960	20,705
1970	31,578
1980	41,594
1990	51,277
2000	67,844
2010	76,140
2015	81,014

== Economy ==
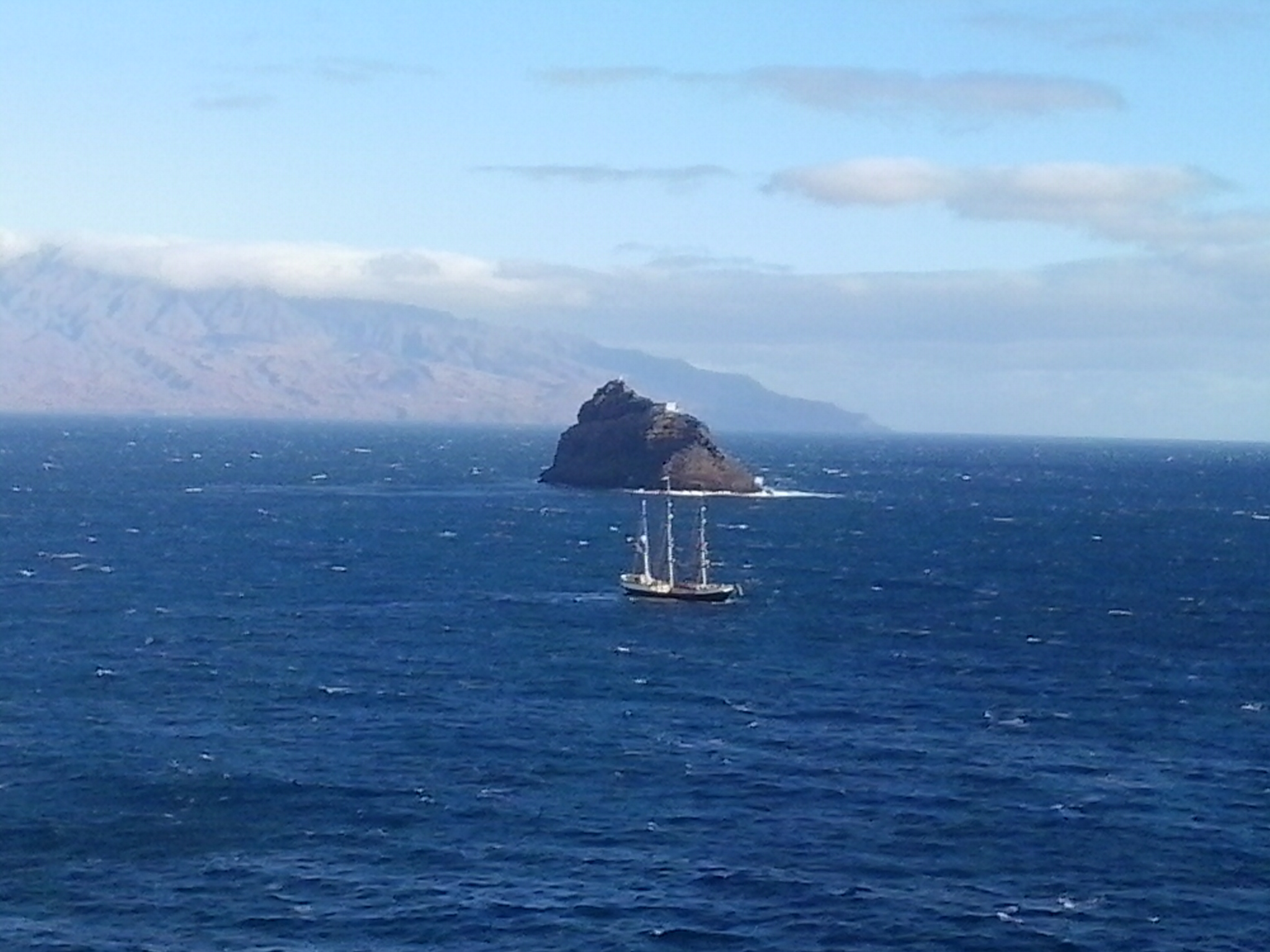
Landscape view of Ilhéu dos Pássaros, Cape Verde

The economy of the island was always based almost exclusively on commerce and services. Due to lack of rain, agriculture is at a subsistence level. Fishing has some relevance, but conditions prevent it from being more important, not only for the catch—lobster—but also for the associated industries: conserves, drying and salting of fish, and naval construction.

Porto Grande is the main port of Cape Verde, through which passes much of the country's imports. It has a terminal of containers, silos, and refrigeration units that make handling load overflow possible. There is also a modern seawater desalination plant, which provides water for public consumption and for naval shipyards.

In the industrial sector, the island presents an abundance of manpower, even though unskilled, resulting from the exodus of inhabitants of other islands to São Vicente. About 27% of the employed population is unskilled. Highly qualified employees—company executives, public administrators, and managers and directors—make up less than 2% of employees. It is distinguished, however, by a bigger participation of women in decision-making positions than the national average.

According to the 2010 census, the island of São Vicente has the largest unemployment rate of the country—14.8%—while the national average is 10.7%. Unemployment affects women more than men. The industrial park of the island—the Industrial Zone of the Lazareto—concentrates diverse types of manufacturing, essentially due to foreign investment, in the activities of footwear, confections, and fish processing.

The National Center of Workmanship of Mindelo supports local craftsmen in the production and commercialization of ceramic parts, articles made of coconut rinds, and necklaces of shells and rocks.

Many sports are practised in São Vicente, and many have spread to the remaining islands. The island is suitable for windsurfing; the beach of São Pedro is considered one of the best for windsurfing, as shown by the many world-class champions of the sport. Cycling, walking trails and horseback riding are ways to explore the island. São Vicente has an excellent 18-hole golf course. For these reasons, tourism has excellent growth potential on São Vicente and in the rest of the Cape Verde archipelago. Travel between the diverse localities of the island is provided by a system of public transportation operated by five private companies: Transcor.SA, Morabeza Transport, Transport Joy, Friendship, Sotral and Automindelo. However, especially for places farthest from the city of the Mindelo, namely Baía das Gatas, Calhau, and São Pedro, van and bus leasing are the usual forms of transportation.

== Education ==
The literacy rate is 85%, and 98.9% among Cape Verdean youth. 54% of the island's population (those aged between 1 and 12 years old) receive education. Here are the schools and classrooms in São Vicente:

- Preschool – 25 daycares, the majority with a particular character, about 2,600 attendees between the ages of 1 and 6
- Primary Schools (1st year to 6th year) – 11,000 students in 225 classrooms with 379 teachers.
- Secondary Education (7th year to 12th year) – 8,000 students in 146 classrooms with 384 professors

=== Educational institutions ===
The island has 35 primary schools, many of which are in Mindelo, there are other schools in Calhau, Salamansa and São Pedro.

There are five state schools, attended by 8,350 pupils during the 2004–05 school season:

- Liceu Ludjero Lima, with 2,384 students
- Escola Industrial E Comercial Do Mindelo, with 2,245 students
- Escola Secundária Jorge Barbosa, with 1,593 students
- Escola Secundária José Augusto Pinto, with 1,385 students
- Escola Salesiana, with 743 students

==== Private schools ====
- Académica do Mindelo – unrelated to the football (soccer) club, today partly related
- Wille
- Centro Técnico Do Mindelo
- Cooperativa Ensino Técnico Do Mindelo
- Cruzeiro

==== Post-secondary education ====
- University of Cape Verde, Faculty of Engineering and Maritime Sciences and School of Business and Governance
- University of Mindelo – Cape Verde's third university
- Instituto Superior de Ciências Económicas Empresariais
- Instituto Superior de Educação [High Educational Institute] (campus), part of the University of Cape Verde
- Jean Piaget University of Cape Verde (campus)
- Mindelo Escolas Internacional de Artes (Mindelo International School of Arts)
- Universidade Lusófona

=== Other institutions and observatories ===
Other academic and research institutions include the INDP Instituto Nacional de Desenvolvimento das Pescas and with it the Cape Verde Ocean Observatory CVOO. It also has the CVAO, the Cape Verde Atmospheric Observatory, associated with the University of York (UK), IFT Leipzig (Germany), Max Planck, Jena (Germany) and the Cape Verdean meteorological institute (INMG).

== Language ==
Other than Portuguese, which is the primary language, Cape Verdean Creole is spoken by the majority of the population. The São Vicente variant is known as Crioulo de São Vicente (in Portuguese) or Kriol d Sonsent (in Creole).

- Orthographic guidelines for writing São Vicentean Kriol
- Dictionary Crioulo-French

Literature

- A Poética de Sérgio Frusoni – Uma Leitura Antropológica (Mesquitela Lima: Lisboa – 1992: Poeme im Kreol von São Vicente mit portugiesischer Übersetzung)
- Left-dislocation and topicalization in capeverdean creole. (Braga, Maria Luiza: Ph. D. Dissertation, University of Pennsylvania – 1982; Crioulo of São Vicente)
- Textos Crioulos Cabo-Verdianos – Sergio Frusoni (In 'Miscelânea luso-africana' 1975, herausgegeben von Marius F. Valkhoff)

== Notable people ==
- Carlos Alhinho, football player and coach
- Alexandre Alhinho, football player and coach
- Leonel Almeida, singer
- Bana, singer
- Bau, musician
- B. Leza, singer and composer
- Valter Borges, footballer
- Bela Duarte, artist
- Dulce Almada Duarte (1933–2019), linguist
- Cesária Évora, singer
- Fantcha, singer
- Sérgio Ferreira (1946–2006), writer
- Corsino Fortes (1933–2015), writer
- Sergio Frusoni, poet
- Fredson Gomes, taekwondo athlete
- João Cleofas Martins, photographer and humorist
- Vasco Martins, composer
- Georgina Mello (1953–2023), general director of CPLP nations
- Luís de Montalvor (1891–1947), better known as Luís da Silva Ramos, Portuguese poet
- Yolanda Morazzo (1927–2009), poet and fictionalist
- Tito Paris (b. 1968)
- Erin Pinheiro, footballer
- Rambé, footballer
- Onésimo Silveira, poet, diplomat and a political activist
- Ovídio de Sousa Martins, poet
- Adriano Spencer, footballer
- Fredson (Fredson Tavares), footballer
- Carlos Veiga (b. 1949), former Prime Minister of Cape Verde
- Lela Violão (Manuel Tomás da Cruz), singer and composer
- Vozinha, footballer

== Transportation ==
The island is served by the international Cesária Évora Airport near São Pedro, in the southwestern part of the island. The port of Mindelo, Porto Grande, is the busiest port of Cape Verde, with ferry services to the islands of Santo Antão, São Nicolau, Santiago and Sal. There is one first class national road on the island: from the airport to Mindelo. Furthermore, there are two second class and five third class national roads.

Mindelo has a network of buses that connects the majority of the suburbs with the city center. Most of the lines are operated by Transcor SV SA.

== Culture ==
When the port was thriving in the late 19th century, in the early 20th century, it was the mainstream of culture in Cape Verde alongside Santiago. Several works, books and poems in the mid 20th century were related to the rise of nationalism and the independence struggle for the country, notably the review Claridade. It is the birthplace of coladeira music. Also a variant of morna is popular.

== Sports ==
The island has its own football league named the São Vicente Island League. There are also competitions for basketball, volleyball, futsal and athletics. There is a golf course about 2 to 3 kilometres (1.2 to 1.9 miles) south of Mindelo.

== Twin towns and sister cities ==
The municipality of São Vicente is twinned with the following municipalities in Portugal:

- Angra do Heroísmo
- Coimbra
- Felgueiras
- Mafra
- Oeiras
- Portalegre
- Portimão
- Porto
- Santa Cruz
- Vila Nova de Famalicão
