= Education in Cape Verde =

Ministry of Education, Family, and Social Inclusion
- Minister: Amadeu Cruz

General details
- Primary languages: Portuguese, Cape Verdean Creole

Literacy (2010)
- Total: c. 75-80%

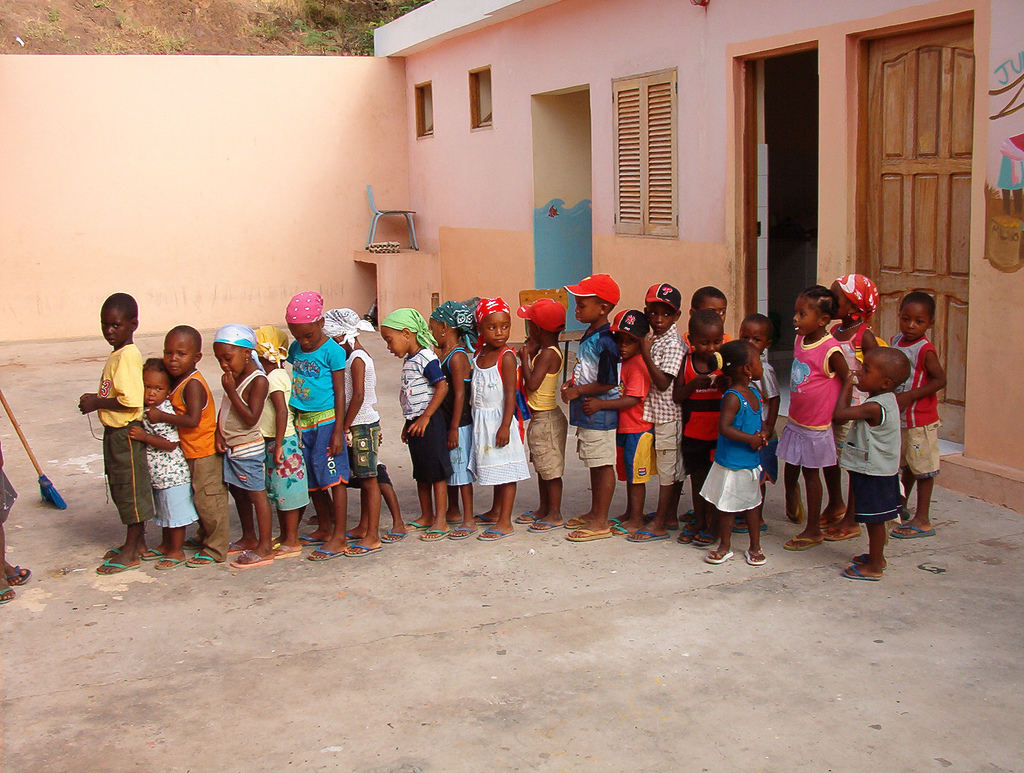
Primary school students lining up for class in Cape Verde

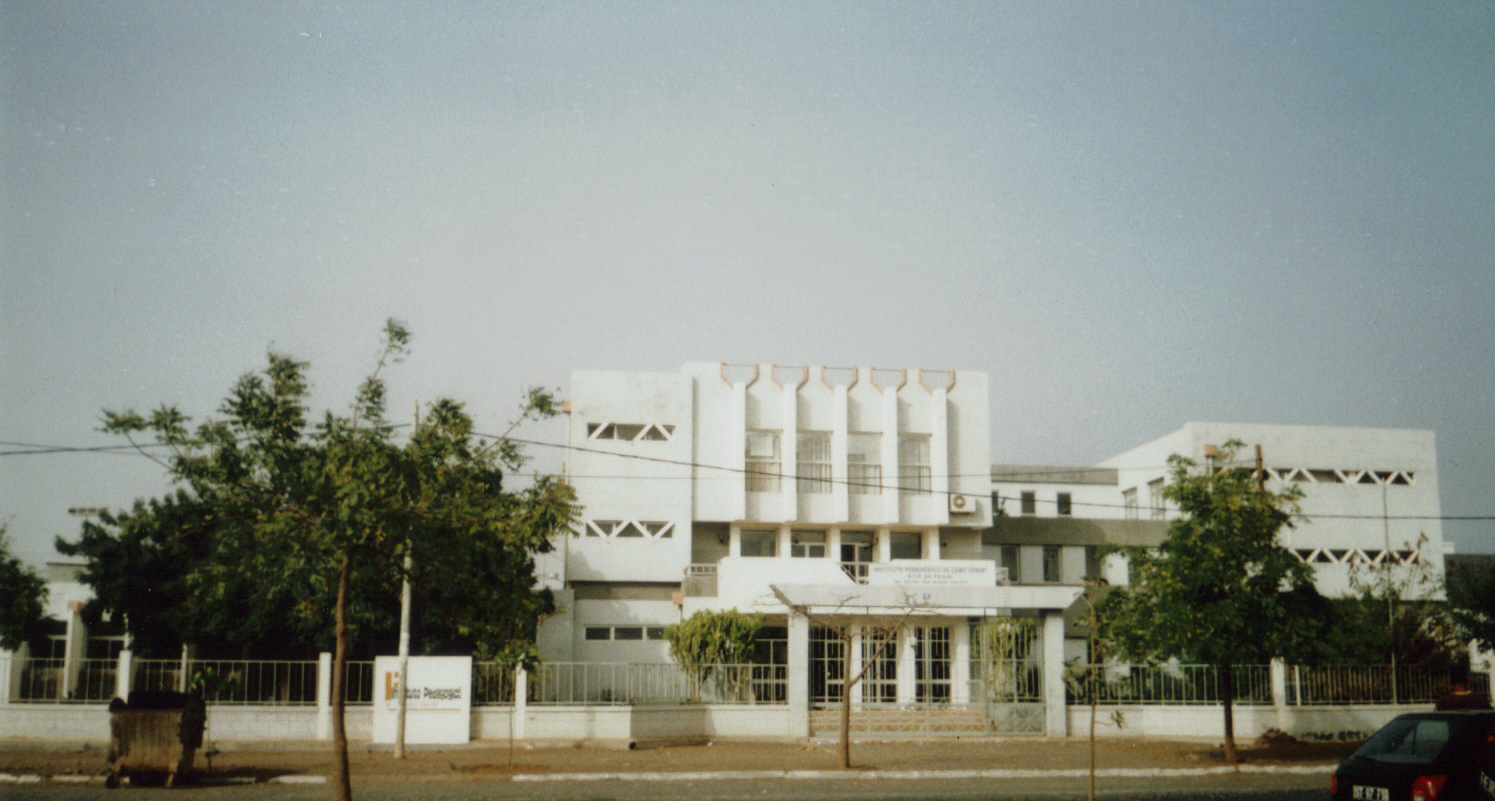
Teachers' Training College in Praia.

Primary school education in Cape Verde is mandatory between the ages of 6–18 and free for children ages 6–18. In 1997, the gross primary enrollment rate was 148.8%. Primary school attendance rates were unavailable for Cape Verde as of 2001. While enrollment rates indicate a level of commitment to education, they do not always reflect children's participation in school. Textbooks have been made available to 90% of school children, and 90% of teachers have attended in-service teacher training. Its literacy rate as of 2010 ranges from 75 to 80%, the highest in West Africa south of the Sahara.

Although most children have access to education, some problems remain. For example, many students and some teachers speak Cape Verdean Creole at home and have a poor command of Portuguese (the language of instruction); there is insufficient spending on school materials, lunches, and books; and there is a high repetition rate for certain grades.

The Human Rights Measurement Initiative (HRMI) finds that Cabo Verde is fulfilling only 82.0% of what it should be fulfilling for the right to education based on the country's level of income. HRMI breaks down the right to education by looking at the rights to both primary education and secondary education. While taking into consideration Cabo Verde's income level, the nation is achieving 88.1% of what should be possible based on its resources (income) for primary education but only 75.9% for secondary education.

== History ==
For much of the nineteenth century, education in Cape Verde was primarily undertaken at the initiative of private individuals or groups at a local level, rather than state organisation. The first government-funded primary school was established on the islands of Brava, Cape Verde in 1847. The first secondary school was set up in Praia in 1860, but closed after a year.

In 1866, a clergy-run Christian seminary named the Seminário-Liceu was started in São Nicolau, primarily to train priests, although not all students were ordained. The curriculum covered mathematics, science, classical languages and European literature.

In 1917 the Seminário-Liceu was replaced by the Liceu Nacional de Cabo Verde D. Infante Henrique, which was established in Mindelo on the island of São Vicente. First housed in what is now the Centro Nacional de Artesanato e Design, it moved to the Liceu Velho building in 1921. It was closed in 1937, and reopened the same year in the same building as Liceu Gil Eanes. Liceu Gil Eanes (the current Liceu Ludgero Lima) opened a section in Praia in 1955, which developed into an independent secondary school in 1960, the current Liceu Domingos Ramos.

More secondary schools opened, including one in Espargos in Sal, Porto Novo in Santo Antão, São Filipe on Fogo, Sal Rei on Boa Vista, in Assomada and Tarrafal, both on Santiago and José Augusto Pinto in Mindelo on São Vicente.

Higher education, which did not exist in Cape Verde in the colonial period, was introduced by the creation of Curso de Formação de Professores do Ensino Secundário (CFPES, "Secondary Education Teacher Training Course") on 28 July 1979. On October 2, 1995, CFPES became Instituto Superior de Educação (ISE, "High Education Institute").

In 1980 the National Institute of Technological Research (INIT - Instituto Nacional de Investigação Tecnológica) was established. It became INIDA (Instituto Nacionai de Investigação e Desenvolvimento Agrário) in 1997. INAG (Instituto Nacional de Administração e Gestão, National Administration and Management Institute) was established on October 21, 1998, succeeding the 1981 Centro de Formação e Aperfeiçoamento Administrativo (CENFA). Centro de Formação Náutica (CFN - Nautical Formation Centre) was established on June 19, 1982. On October 21, 1996, it became ISECMAR (Instituto Superior de Engenharias e Ciências do Mar, High Institute of Marine Engineering and Sciences).

ISE, ISECMAR and INAG joined to become the University of Cape Verde (the country's first public university) on November 21, 2006; INIDA joined in 2007. All of the predecessor schools would be eliminated and fully became campuses on October 9, 2008. Uni-CV's university campuses are under development which started construction in 2014.

Cape Verde's first private university was established in 2001: the Jean Piaget University of Cape Verde. In 2008, Universidade de Santiago was established in Assomada. The University of Mindelo was established in 2010. There is also the Universidade Lusófona de Cabo Verde in Mindelo and Praia.

== See also ==
- List of universities in Cape Verde
