= History of Portugal (1415–1578) =

Kingdom of Portugal and the Algarves Reyno de Portugal et dos Algarues (Portuguese) Reino de Portugal e dos Algarves (Portuguese)
- 1415–1580
- Royal Banner Coat of arms
- Capital: Lisbon
- Common languages: Galician-Portuguese, Old Modern Portuguese
- Religion: Roman Catholic
- Demonym: Portuguese
- Government: Absolute monarchy
- Monarch
  - 1415–1433: João I (first)
  - 1578–1580: Henrique I (last)
- History
  - Conquest of Ceuta: 14 August 1415
  - Battle of Alcácer Quibir: 4 August 1578
  - Death of Henrique I: 31 January 1580
- Currency: Portuguese dinheiro, Portuguese real
Preceded by	Succeeded by
Portugal in the Middle Ages	Iberian Union

The history of the Kingdom of Portugal from the Illustrious Generation of the early 15th century to the fall of the House of Aviz in the late 16th century has been named the "Portuguese golden age" (Portuguese: Século de Ouro; "golden century") and the "Portuguese Renaissance". During this period, Portugal was the first European power to begin building a colonial empire as during the Age of Exploration Portuguese sailors and explorers discovered an eastern route to India (that rounded the Cape of Good Hope) as well as several Atlantic archipelagos (like the Azores, Madeira, and Cape Verde) and colonized the African coast and Brazil. They also explored the Indian Ocean and established trading routes throughout most of southern Asia, sending the first direct European maritime trade and diplomatic missions to Ming China and to Japan, at the same time installing trading posts and the most important colony: Portuguese Macau (Only in East Asia). The Portuguese Renaissance produced a plethora of poets, historians, critics, theologians, and moralists. The Cancioneiro Geral by Garcia de Resende (printed 1516) is taken to mark the transition from Old Portuguese to the modern Portuguese language.

== John I ==
John I of Portugal acceded in 1390 and ruled in peace, pursuing the economic development of his realm. The only significant military action was the siege and conquest of the city of Ceuta in 1415. By this step he aimed to control navigation of the African cut in the broader perspective, this was the first step opening the Arab world to medieval Europe, which in fact led to the Age of Discovery with Portuguese explorers sailing across the whole world.

Contemporaneous writers describe John as a man of wit, very keen on concentrating power on himself, but at the same time with a benevolent and kind personality. His love for knowledge and culture was passed to his sons, often collectively referred to by Portuguese historians as the "illustrious generation" (Ínclita Geração): Edward, the future king, was a poet and a writer; Peter, the Duke of Coimbra, was one of the most learned princes of his time; and Prince Henry the Navigator, the duke of Viseu, invested heavily in science and the development of nautical pursuits. In 1430, John's only surviving daughter, Isabella, married Philip the Good, Duke of Burgundy, and enjoyed an extremely refined court culture in his lands; she was the mother of Charles the Bold.

== Edward ==
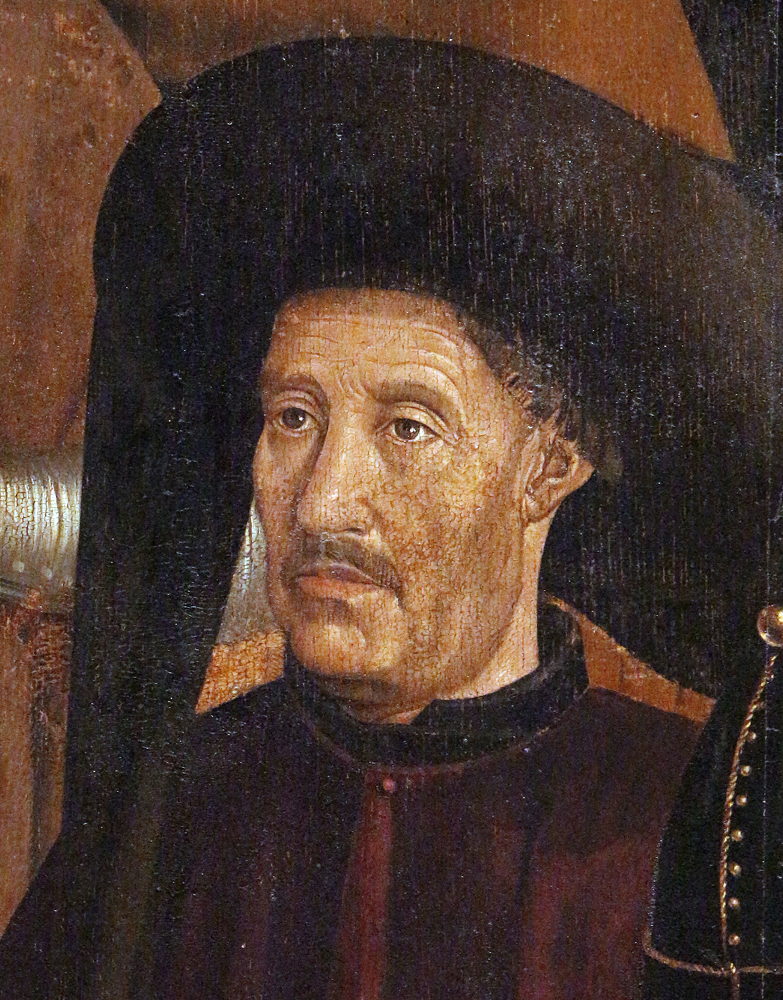
Prince Henry, the Navigator

Under king Edward, the colony at Ceuta rapidly became a drain on the Portuguese treasury, and it was realised that without the city of Tangier, possession of Ceuta was worthless. In 1437, Duarte's brothers Henry and Ferdinand persuaded him to launch an attack on the Marinid sultanate of Morocco. The expedition was not unanimously supported: Infante Peter, Duke of Coimbra, and the Infante John were both against the initiative; they preferred to avoid conflict with the king of Morocco. Their instincts proved to be justified. The resulting attack on Tangier, led by Henry, was a debacle. Failing to take the city in a series of assaults, the Portuguese siege camp was soon itself surrounded and starved into submission by a Moroccan relief army. In the resulting treaty, Henry promised to deliver Ceuta back to the Marinids in return for allowing the Portuguese army to depart unmolested. Duarte's youngest brother, Ferdinand, was handed over to the Marinids as a hostage for the final handover of the city.

== Afonso V ==
=== Treaty of Tordesillas ===
Meanwhile, colonization progressed in the Azores and Madeira, where sugar and wine were now produced; above all, the gold brought home from Guinea stimulated the commercial energy of the Portuguese. It had become clear that, apart from their religious and scientific aspects, these voyages of discovery were highly profitable. Under Afonso V (1443–1481), surnamed the African, the Gulf of Guinea was explored as far as Cape St Catherine (Cabo Santa Catarina), and three expeditions (1458, 1461 and 1471) were sent to Morocco; in 1471 Arzila and Tangier were captured from the Moors. Under John II (1481–1495) the fortress of São Jorge da Mina, the modern Elmina, was founded for the protection of the Guinea trade. Diogo Cão, discovered the Congo in 1482 and reached Cape Cross in 1486; Bartolomeu Dias doubled the Cape of Good Hope in 1488, thus proving that the Indian Ocean was accessible by sea.

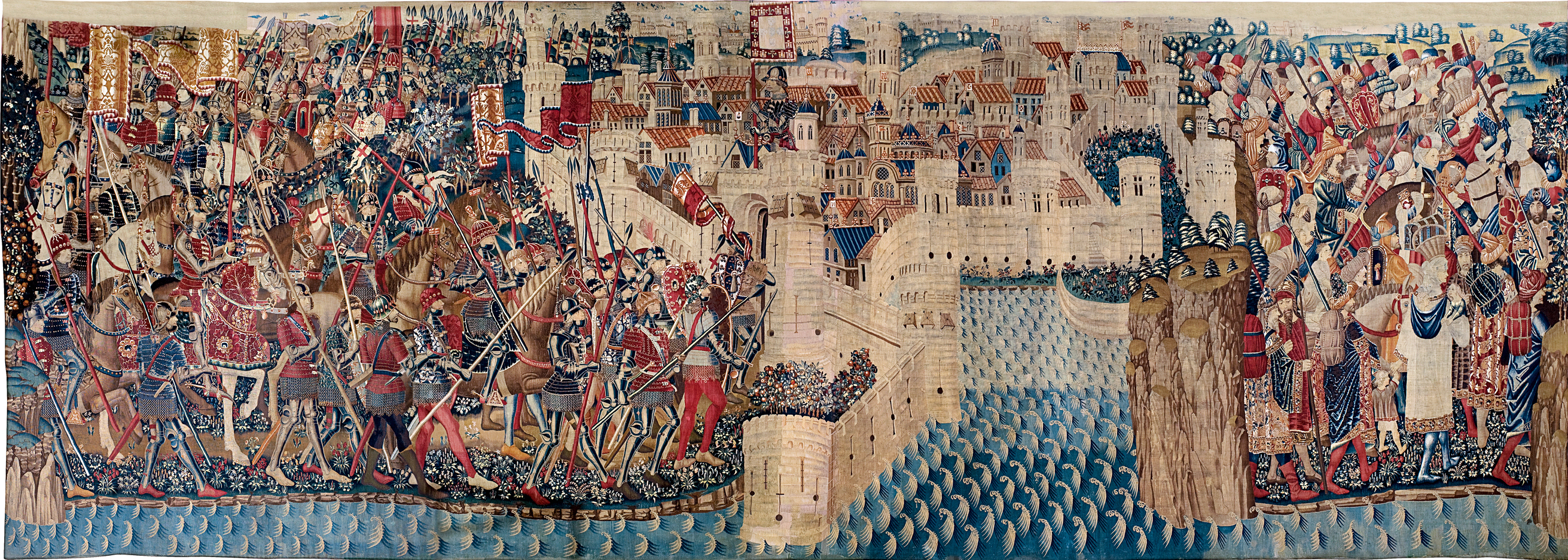
Conquest of Tangier in 1471, from the Pastrana series of tapestries

After 1492 the arrival of Christopher Columbus in the West Indies rendered desirable a delimitation of the Spanish and Portuguese spheres of exploration. This was accomplished by the Treaty of Tordesillas (June 7, 1494), which modified the delimitation authorized by Pope Alexander VI in two bulls issued on May 4, 1493. The treaty gave to Portugal all lands that might be discovered east of a straight line drawn from the Arctic Pole to the Antarctic, at a distance of 370 leagues west of Cape Verde. Spain received the lands discovered west of this line. The known means of measuring longitude were so inexact, however, that the line of demarcation could not in practice be determined (see J. de Andrade Corvo in Journal das Ciências Matemáticas, xxxi.147–176, Lisbon, 1881), so the treaty was subject to very diverse interpretations. On its provisions were based both the Portuguese claim to Brazil and the Spanish claim to the Moluccas (see History of East Indies). The treaty was chiefly valuable to the Portuguese as a recognition of the prestige they had acquired. That prestige was enormously enhanced when, in 1497–1499, Vasco da Gama completed the voyage to India.

The tendency to secrecy and falsification of dates casts doubts about the authenticity of many primary sources. Several historians have hypothesized that John II may have known of the existence of Brazil and North America as early as 1480, thus explaining his wish in 1494 at the signing of the Treaty of Tordesillas to push the line of influence further west. Many historians suspect that the real documents would have been placed in the Library of Lisbon. Unfortunately, due to the fire following the earthquake of 1755, nearly all of the library's records were destroyed, but an extra copy available in Goa was transferred to Lisbon Tower of Tombo during the following 100 years. The Corpo Cronológico (Chronological Corpus), a collection of manuscripts on the Portuguese explorations and discoveries in Africa, Asia and Latin America, was inscribed on UNESCO’s Memory of the World Register in 2007 in recognition of its historical value "for acquiring knowledge of the political, diplomatic, military, economic and religious history of numerous countries at the time of the Portuguese Discoveries."

=== Afonsine Ordinances ===
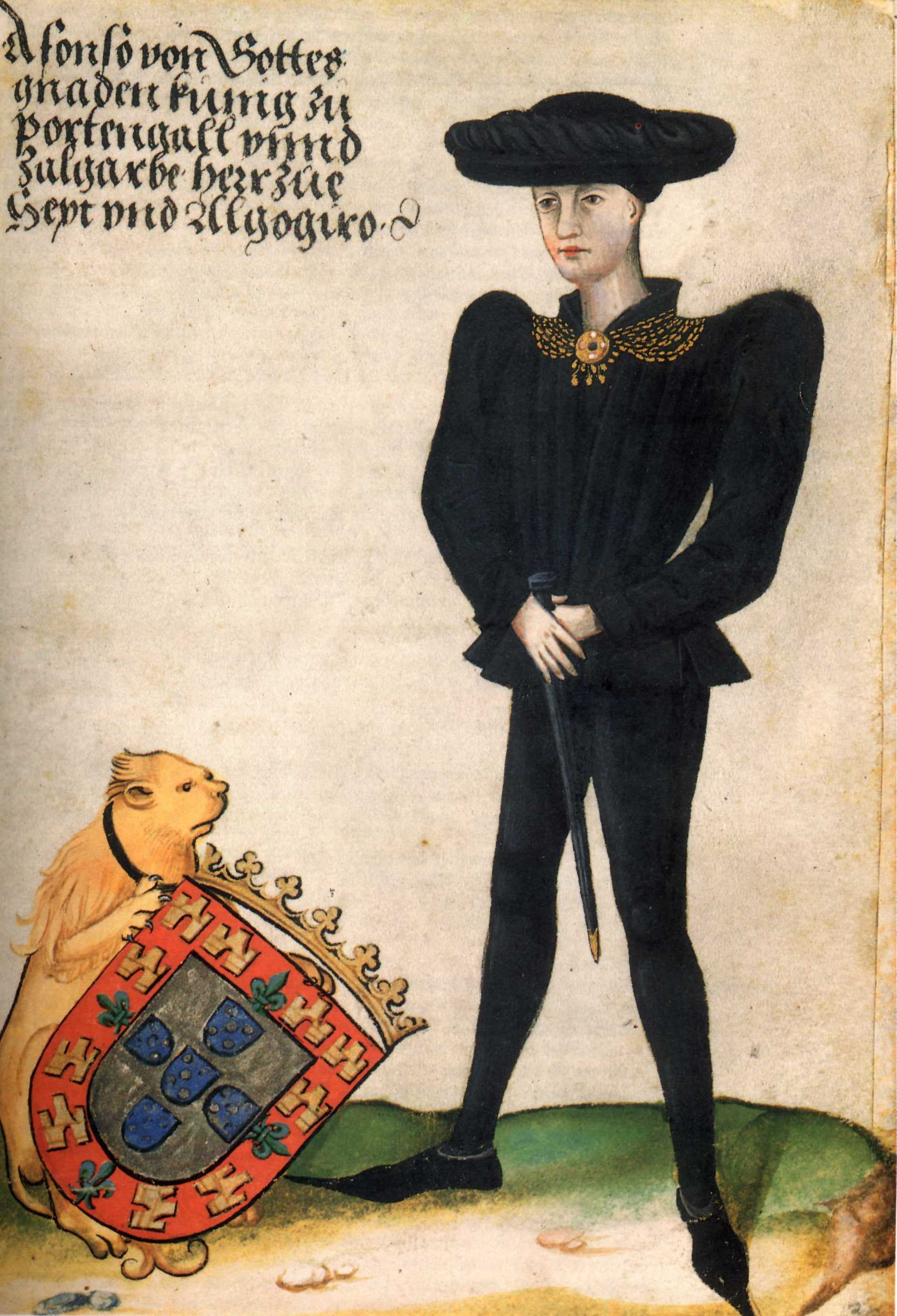
King Afonso V of Portugal

While the Crown was thus acquiring new possessions, its authority in Portugal was temporarily overshadowed by the growth of aristocratic privilege. After the death of Edward, further attempts to curb the power of the nobles were made by his brother, D. Pedro, duke of Coimbra, who acted as regent during the minority of Afonso V of Portugal (1439–1448). The head of the aristocratic opposition was the Duke of Braganza, who contrived to secure the sympathy of the king and the dismissal of the regent. The quarrel led to civil war, and on 20 May 1449, D. Pedro was defeated and killed at the Battle of Alfarrobeira. Thenceforward the grants made by John I were renewed and extended on so lavish a scale that the Braganza estates alone comprised about a third of the whole kingdom.

An unwise foreign policy simultaneously injured the royal prestige, for Afonso married his own niece, Joanna, daughter of Henry IV of Castile, and claimed the kingdom of Castile in her name. At the Battle of Toro, in 1476, he fought an indecisive battle that made him realize that his claims to the Castilian throne were not achievable. However, Portugal defeated Castile in the naval war (1475–79) of the same conflict (War of the Castilian Succession), capturing a large Castilian fleet -full of gold- in the Battle of Guinea (1478).

In 1479 Ferdinand and Isabella and Afonso signed the Treaty of Alcáçovas, by which Joanna was relegated to a convent and Portugal won the hegemony in the Atlantic Ocean.

His successor, John II (1481–1495), reverted to the policy of matrimonial alliances with Castile and friendship with England. Finding, as he said, that the liberality of former kings had left the Crown "no estates except the high roads of Portugal," he determined to crush the feudal nobility and seize its territories. The Portuguese Cortes held at Évora (1481) empowered judges nominated by the Crown to administer justice in all feudal domains. The nobles resisted this infringement of their rights, but their leader, Fernando II, Duke of Braganza, was beheaded for high treason in 1483; in 1484 the king stabbed to death his own brother-in-law, Diogo, Duke of Viseu; and eighty other members of the aristocracy were executed afterwards. Thus John "the Perfect," as he was called, assured the supremacy of the Crown. He was succeeded in 1495 by Manuel I, who was named "the Great" or "the Fortunate," because in his reign the sea route to India was discovered and a Portuguese Empire founded.

== Imperial expansion (1481–1557) ==
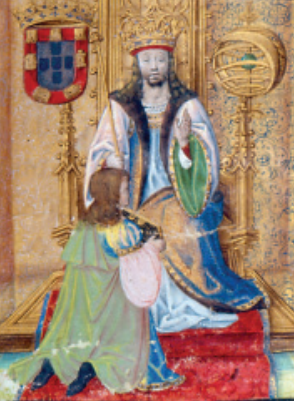
King John II in Chronica d'El-Rei D. João II; Rui de Pina, c. 1497–1504.

John II (r. 1481–1495) famously restored the policies of Atlantic exploration, reviving the work of his great-uncle, Henry the Navigator. The Portuguese explorations were his main priority in government, pushing south the known coast of Africa with the purpose of discovering the maritime route to India and breaking into the spice trade. Manuel I (r. 1495–1521) proved a worthy successor to his cousin John II, supporting Portuguese exploration of the Atlantic Ocean and the development of Portuguese commerce.

Under John III (r. 1521–1557), Portuguese possessions were extended in Asia and in the New World through the Portuguese colonization of Brazil. John III's policy of reinforcing Portugal's bases in India (such as Goa) secured Portugal's monopoly over the spice trade of cloves and nutmeg from the Maluku Islands. As a result, John III has been called the "Grocer King". On the eve of his death in 1557, the Portuguese empire spanned almost 1 billion acres (about 4 million square kilometers). During his reign, the Portuguese became the first Europeans to make contact with both China, under the Ming Dynasty, and Japan, during the Muromachi period (see Nanban trade). John III abandoned Muslim territories in North Africa in favor of trade with India and investment in Brazil. In Europe, he improved relations with the Baltic region and the Rhineland, hoping that this would bolster Portuguese trade.

== Sebastian I ==
Sebastian of Portugal was the penultimate Portuguese monarch of the House of Aviz. He was the son of John Manuel, Prince of Portugal, and his wife, Joanna of Austria. Sebastian succeeded to the throne at the age of three, on the death of King John III, his paternal grandfather. Soon after his birth, his mother Joanna of Spain left her infant son to serve as Regent of Spain for her father, Emperor Charles V. After his abdication in 1556, she served in the same capacity for her brother Philip II of Spain. Joanna remained in Spain until her death in 1573, never to see her son again. Since Sebastian was still a child, the regency was handled first by his paternal grandmother, Catherine of Austria, and then by his great-uncle, Cardinal Henry of Évora. During this period Portugal continued colonial expansion in Angola, Mozambique, and Malacca, as well as the annexation of Macau in 1557.

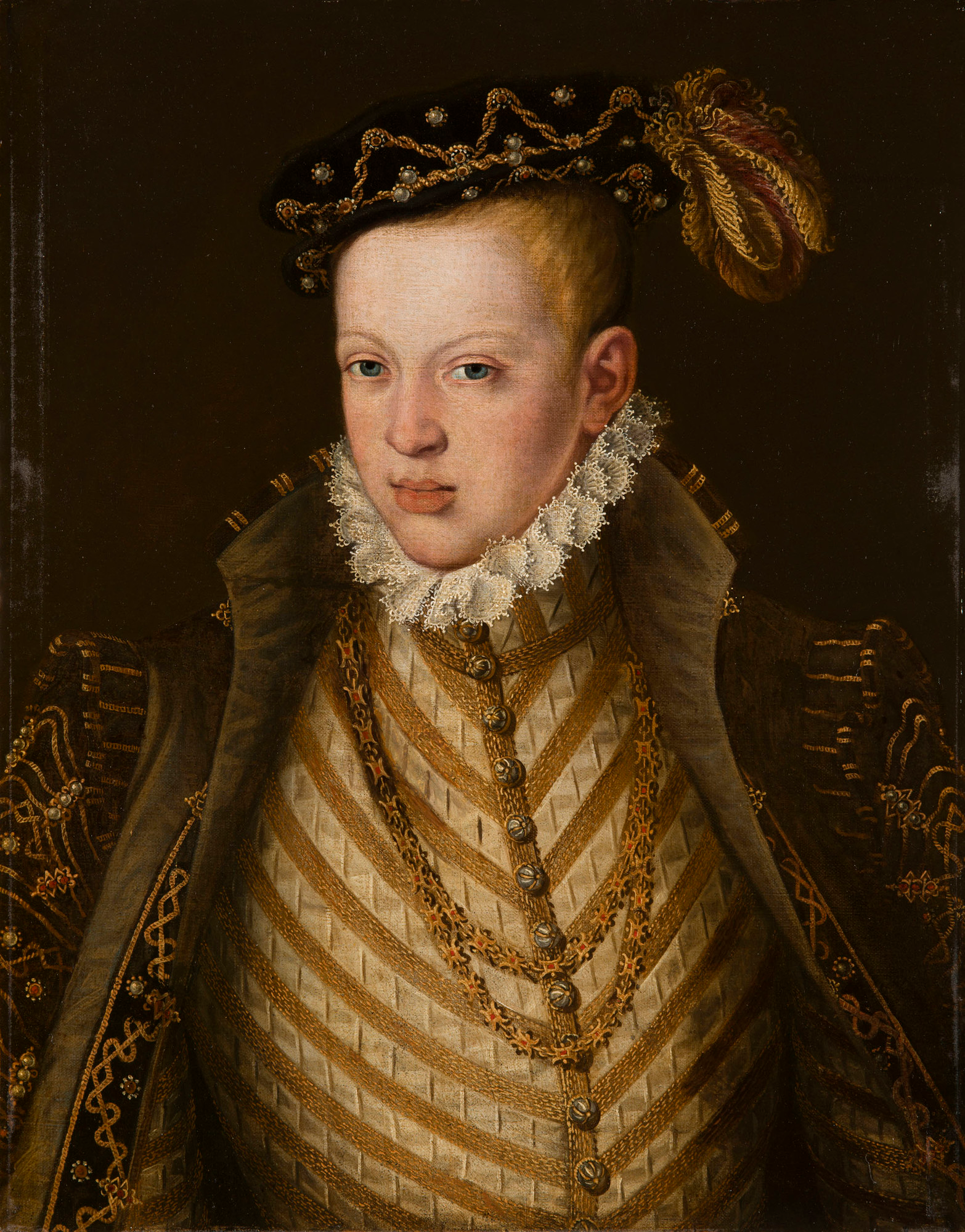
D. Sebastião I. R. de Portugal XVI.

During Sebastian's short personal reign, he strengthened ties with the Holy Roman Empire, England and France through diplomatic efforts. He also restructured much of the administrative, judicial and military life in his kingdom. In 1568, Sebastian created scholarships to provide financial assistance to students who wished to study medicine or pharmacy at the University of Coimbra. In 1569, Sebastian ordered Duarte Nunes de Leão to compile all the laws and legal documents of the kingdom in a collection of Leis Extravagantes known as Código Sebastiânico (Sebastian's code).

During the great plague of Lisbon in 1569, Sebastian sent for doctors from Seville to help the Portuguese doctors fight the plague. He created two hospitals in Lisbon to take care of the afflicted. In his concern for the widows and orphans of those killed by the plague, he created several Recolhimentos (shelters), known as the Recolhimento de Santa Marta (shelter of Santa Marta) and the Recolhimento dos Meninos (shelter of the children), and provided wet nurses to take care of the babies.

Sebastian created laws for the military, the Lei das Armas, that would become a military organization model. In 1570 Goa was attacked by the Indian army, but the Portuguese were successful in repulsing the assault. Also in 1570, Sebastian ordered that Brazilian Indians should not be used as slaves and ordered the release of those held in captivity.

The Celeiros Comuns (Communal Granaries) were inaugurated in 1576 on Sebastian's orders. These were lending institutions intended to help to poor farmers when farm production decreased, giving credit, lending seeds and commodities to the needy, and allowing them to pay back with farm products when they recovered from losses.

In 1577 Sebastian's ordinance Da nova ordem do juízo, sobre o abreviar das demandas, e execução dellas decreased the time for handling legal actions, regulated the action of lawyers, scribes and other court officials, and created fines for delays.

Sebastian disappeared (and was presumably killed in action) in the battle of Alcácer Quibir in 1578, after the brief reign of King Henry triggering the Portuguese succession crisis.

== Dynastic crisis and union with Spain ==
Following the Portuguese crisis of succession, a dynastic union joined the crowns of Castile, Portugal and Aragon along with their respective colonial possessions, under the rule of the Habsburg dynasty

The unification of the peninsula had long been a goal of the region's monarchs with the intent of restoring the Visigothic monarchy.

The history of Portugal from the dynastic crisis in 1578 to the first Braganza Dynasty monarchs was a period of transition. The Portuguese Empire's spice trade was peaking at the start of this period. It continued to enjoy widespread influence after Vasco da Gama had finally reached the East by sailing around Africa in 1497–98.

== Explorations ==
=== Reasons for exploration ===
Portugal's long shoreline, with its many harbours and rivers flowing westward to the Atlantic Ocean was the ideal environment to raise generations of adventurous seamen. As a seafaring people in the south-westernmost region of Europe, the Portuguese became natural leaders of exploration during the Middle Ages. Faced with the options of either accessing other European markets by sea (by exploiting its seafaring prowess) or by land (and facing the task of crossing Castile and Aragon territory) it is not surprising that goods were sent via the sea to England, Flanders, Italy and the Hanseatic league towns.

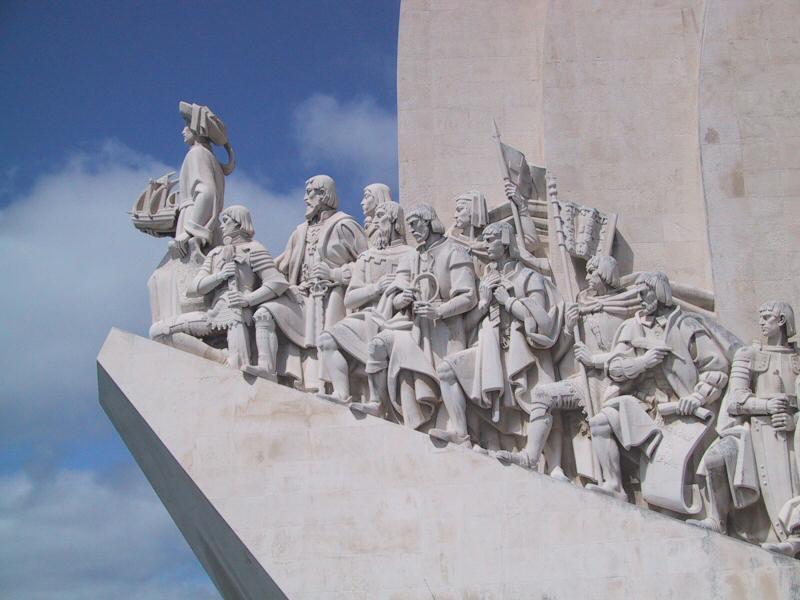
The Padrão dos Descobrimentos ("Monument to the Discoveries") in Lisbon

Having fought to achieve and to retain independence, the nation's leadership had also a desire for fresh conquests. Added to this was a long struggle to expel the Moors that was religiously sanctioned and influenced by foreign crusaders with a desire for martial fame. Making war on Islam seemed to the Portuguese both their natural destiny and their duty as Christians.

One important reason was the need to overcome the expensive eastern trade routes, dominated first by the republics of Venice and Genoa in the Mediterranean, and then controlled by the Ottoman Empire after the conquest of Constantinople in 1453, barring European access, and going through North Africa and the historically important combined-land-sea routes via the Red Sea. Both spice and silk were big businesses of the day, and arguably, spices which were used as medicine, drugs and preservatives was something of a necessity—at least to those Europeans of better than modest means.

The Portuguese economy had benefited from its connections with neighbouring Muslim states. A money economy was well enough established for 15th century workers in the countryside as well as in the towns to be paid in currency. The agriculture of the countryside had diversified to the point where grain was imported from Morocco (a symptom of an economy dependent upon Portugal's), while specialised crops occupied former grain-growing areas: vineyards, olives, or the sugar factories of the Algarve, later to be reproduced in Brazil (Braudel 1985). Most of all, the Aviz dynasty that had come to power in 1385 marked the semi-eclipse of the conservative land-oriented aristocracy (See The Consolidation of the Monarchy in Portugal.) A constant exchange of cultural ideals made Portugal a centre of knowledge and technological development. Due to these connections with Islamic kingdoms, many mathematicians and experts in naval technology appeared in Portugal. The Portuguese government impelled this even further by taking full advantage of this and by creating several important research centres in Portugal, where Portuguese and foreign experts made several breakthroughs in the fields of mathematics, cartography and naval technology. Sagres and Lagos in the Algarve become famous as such places.

=== Portuguese nautical science ===
The successive expeditions and experience of the pilots led to a fairly rapid evolution of Portuguese nautical science, creating an elite of astronomers, navigators, mathematicians and cartographers, among them stood Pedro Nunes with studies on how to determine the latitudes by the stars and João de Castro.

==== Ships ====
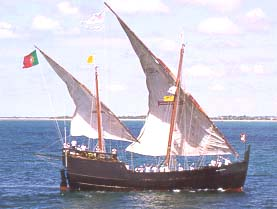
A modern replica of a Portuguese caravel

Until the 15th century, the Portuguese were limited to coastal cabotage navigation using barques and barinels (ancient cargo vessels used in the Mediterranean). These boats were small and fragile, with only one mast with a fixed quadrangular sail and did not have the capabilities to overcome the navigational difficulties associated with Southward oceanic exploration, as the strong winds, shoals and strong ocean currents easily overwhelmed their abilities. They are associated with the earliest discoveries, such as the Madeira Islands, the Azores, the Canaries, and to the early exploration of the north west African coast as far south as Arguim in the current Mauritania.

The ship that truly launched the first phase of the Portuguese discoveries along the African coast was the caravel, a development based on existing fishing boats. They were agile and easier to navigate, with a tonnage of 50 to 160 tons and 1 to 3 masts, with lateen triangular sails allowing luffing. The caravel benefited from a greater capacity to tack. The limited capacity for cargo and crew were their main drawbacks, but did not hinder its success. Limited crew and cargo space was acceptable, initially, because as exploratory ships, their "cargo" was what was in the explorer's feedback of a new territory, which only took up the space of one person. Among the famous caravels are Berrio and Caravela Annunciation.

With the start of long oceanic sailing also large ships developed. "Nau" was the Portuguese archaic synonym for any large ship, primarily merchant ships. Due to the piracy that plagued the coasts, they began to be used in the navy and were provided with cannon windows, which led to the classification of "naus" according to the power of its artillery. They were also adapted to the increasing maritime trade: from 200 tons capacity in the 15th century to 500, they become impressive in the 16th century, having usually two decks, stern castles fore and aft, two to four masts with overlapping sails. In India travels in the sixteenth century there were also used carracks, large merchant ships with a high edge and three masts with square sails, that reached 2000 tons.

==== Celestial navigation ====
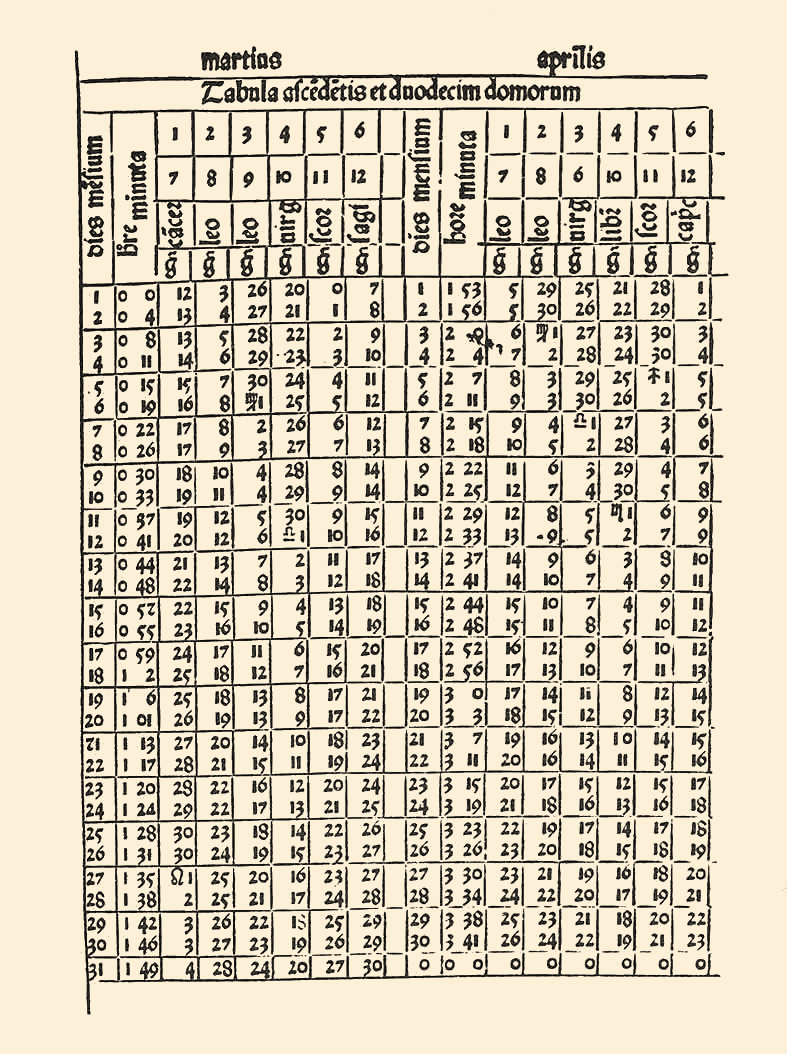
Ephemeris by Abraham Zacuto in Almanach Perpetuum, 1496

In the thirteenth century celestial navigation was already known, guided by the Sun position. For celestial navigation the Portuguese, like other Europeans, used Arab navigation tools, like the astrolabe and quadrant, which they made easier and simpler. They also created the cross-staff, or cane of Jacob, for measuring at sea the height of the Sun and other stars. The Southern Cross become a reference upon arrival at the Southern Hemisphere by João de Santarém and Pedro Escobar in 1471, starting the celestial navigation on this constellation. But the results varied throughout the year, which required corrections.

To this the Portuguese used the astronomical tables (Ephemeris), precious tools for oceanic navigation, which have experienced a remarkable diffusion in the fifteenth century. These tables revolutionized navigation, allowing to calculate latitude. The tables of the Almanach Perpetuum, by astronomer Abraham Zacuto, published in Leiria in 1496, were used along with its improved astrolabe, by Vasco da Gama and Pedro Álvares Cabral.

==== Sailing techniques ====
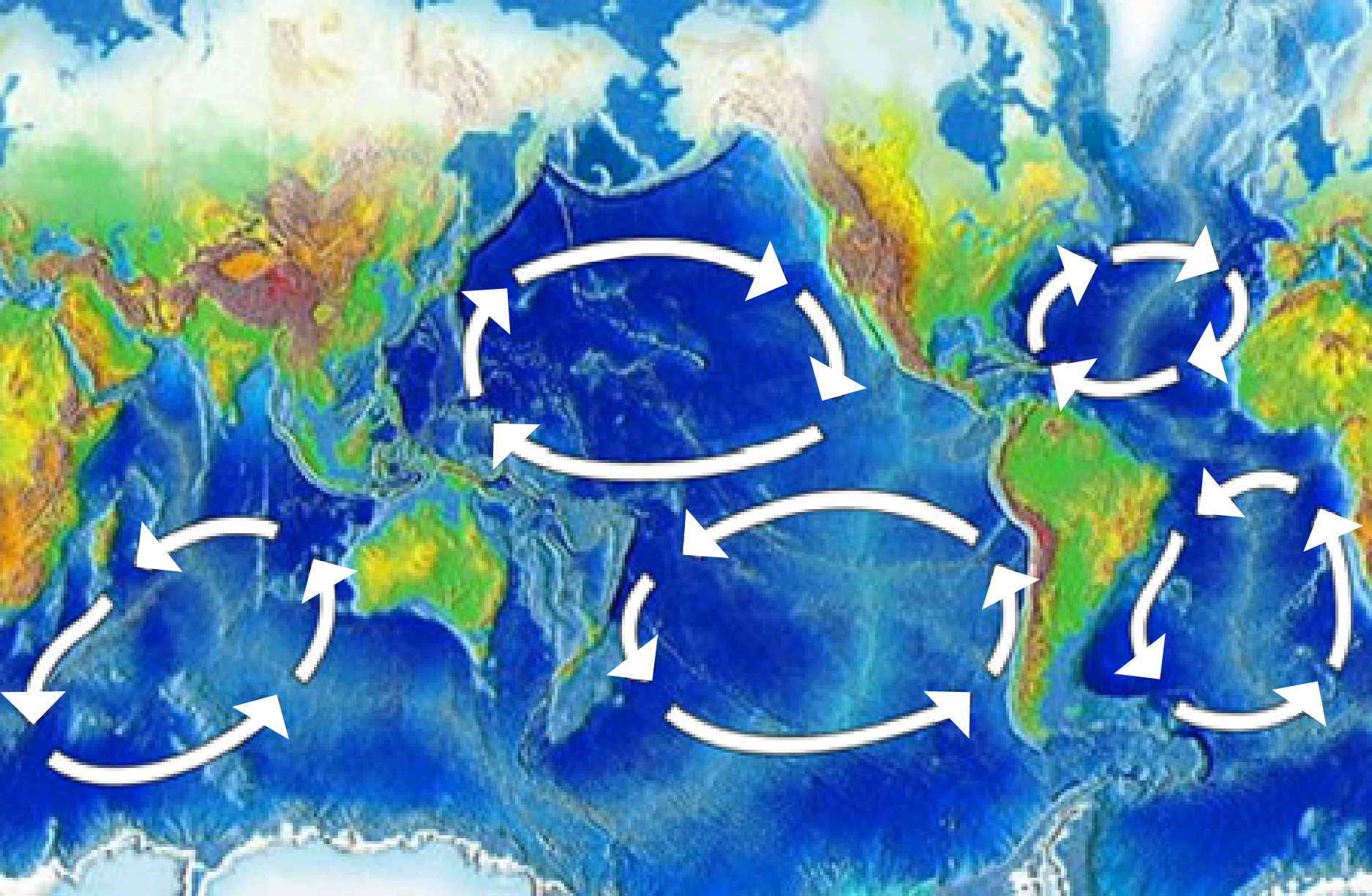
Map of the five major oceanic gyres

Besides coastal exploration, Portuguese also made trips off in the ocean to gather meteorological and oceanographic information (in these were discovered the archipelagos of Madeira and the Azores, and Sargasso Sea). The knowledge of wind patterns and currents, the trade winds and the oceanic gyres in the Atlantic, and the determination of latitude led to the discovery of the best ocean route back from Africa: crossing the Central Atlantic to the latitude of the Azores, using the permanent favorable winds and currents that spin clockwise in the Northern Hemisphere because of atmospheric circulation and the effect of Coriolis, facilitating the way to Lisbon and thus enabling the Portuguese venturing increasingly farther from shore, the maneuver that became known as the "volta do mar" (English: return of the sea).

==== Cartography ====
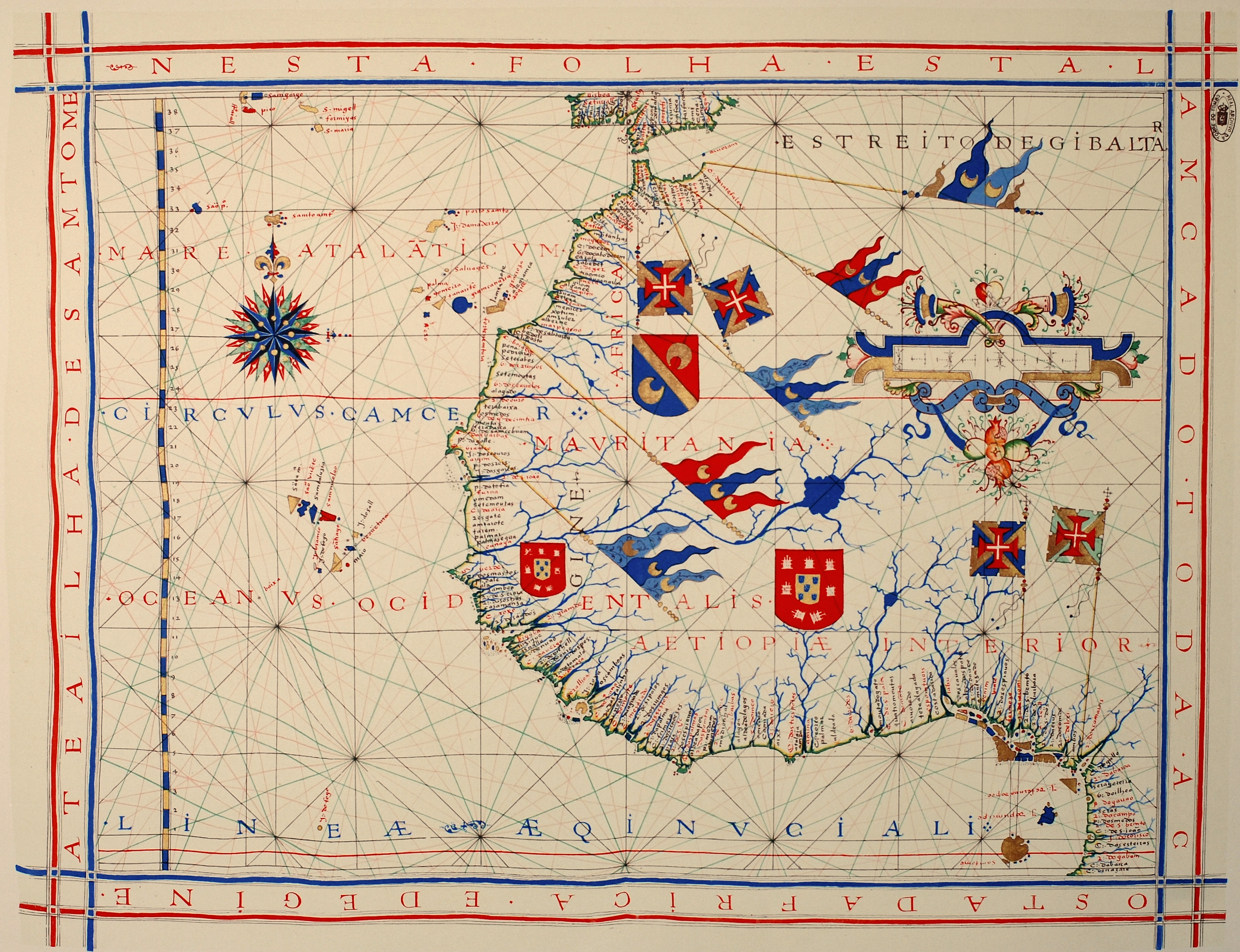
Pre-mercator navigation chart of the Coast of Africa (1571), by Fernão Vaz Dourado (Torre do Tombo, Lisbon)

It is thought that Jehuda Cresques, son of the Catalan cartographer Abraham Cresques have been one of the notable cartographers at the service of Prince Henry. However the oldest signed Portuguese sea chart is a Portolan made by Pedro Reinel in 1485 representing the Western Europe and parts of Africa, reflecting the explorations made by Diogo Cão. Reinel was also author of the first nautical chart known with an indication of latitudes in 1504 and the first representation of a Wind rose.

With his son, cartographer Jorge Reinel and Lopo Homem, they participated in the making of the atlas known as "Lopo Homem-Reinés Atlas" or "Miller Atlas", in 1519. They were considered the best cartographers of their time, with Emperor Charles V wanting them to work for him. In 1517 King Manuel I of Portugal handed Lopo Homem a charter giving him the privilege to certify and amend all compass needles in vessels.

In the third phase of the former Portuguese nautical cartography, characterized by the abandonment of the influence of Ptolemy's representation of the East and more accuracy in the representation of lands and continents, stands out Fernão Vaz Dourado (Goa ~ 1520 – ~ 1580), whose work has extraordinary quality and beauty, giving him a reputation as one of the best cartographers of the time. Many of his charts are large scale.

=== Henry the Navigator ===
It was the genius of Prince Henry the Navigator that coordinated and utilized all these tendencies towards expansion. Prince Henry placed at the disposal of his captains the vast resources of the Order of Christ, of which he was the head, and the best information and most accurate instruments and maps that could be obtained. He sought to effect a meeting with the half-fabulous Christian Empire of "Prester John" by way of the "Western Nile" (the Sénégal River), and, in alliance with that potentate, to crush the Turks and liberate the Holy Land. The concept of an ocean route to India appears to have originated after his death. On land he again defeated the Moors, who attempted to retake Ceuta in 1418; but in an expedition to Tangier, undertaken in 1437 by King Edward (1433–1438), the Portuguese army was defeated, and could only escape destruction by surrendering as a hostage Prince Ferdinand, the king's youngest brother. Ferdinand, known as "the Constant", from the fortitude with which he endured captivity, died unransomed in 1443. By sea Prince Henry's captains continued their exploration of Africa and the Atlantic Ocean. In 1433 Cape Bojador was rounded; in 1434 the first consignment of slaves was brought to Lisbon; and slave trading soon became the most profitable branch of Portuguese commerce, until India was reached. The Senegal was reached in 1445, Cape Verde was passed in the same year, and in 1446 Álvaro Fernandes pushed on almost as far as Sierra Leone. This was probably the farthest point reached before the Navigator died in 1460. Another vector of the discoveries were the voyages westward, during which the Portuguese discovered the Sargasso Sea and possibly sighted the shores of Nova Scotia well before 1492.

=== Portuguese in Asia ===
The effort to colonize and maintain territories scattered around the entire coast of Africa and its surrounding islands, Brazil, India and Indic territories such as in Sri Lanka, Malaysia, Japan, China, Indonesia and Timor was a challenge for a population of only one million. Combined with constant competition from the Spanish this led to a desire for secrecy about every trade route and every colony. As a consequence, many documents that could reach other European countries were in fact fake documents with fake dates and faked facts, to mislead any other nation's possible efforts.

=== Portuguese discoveries and explorations (1415–1543) ===
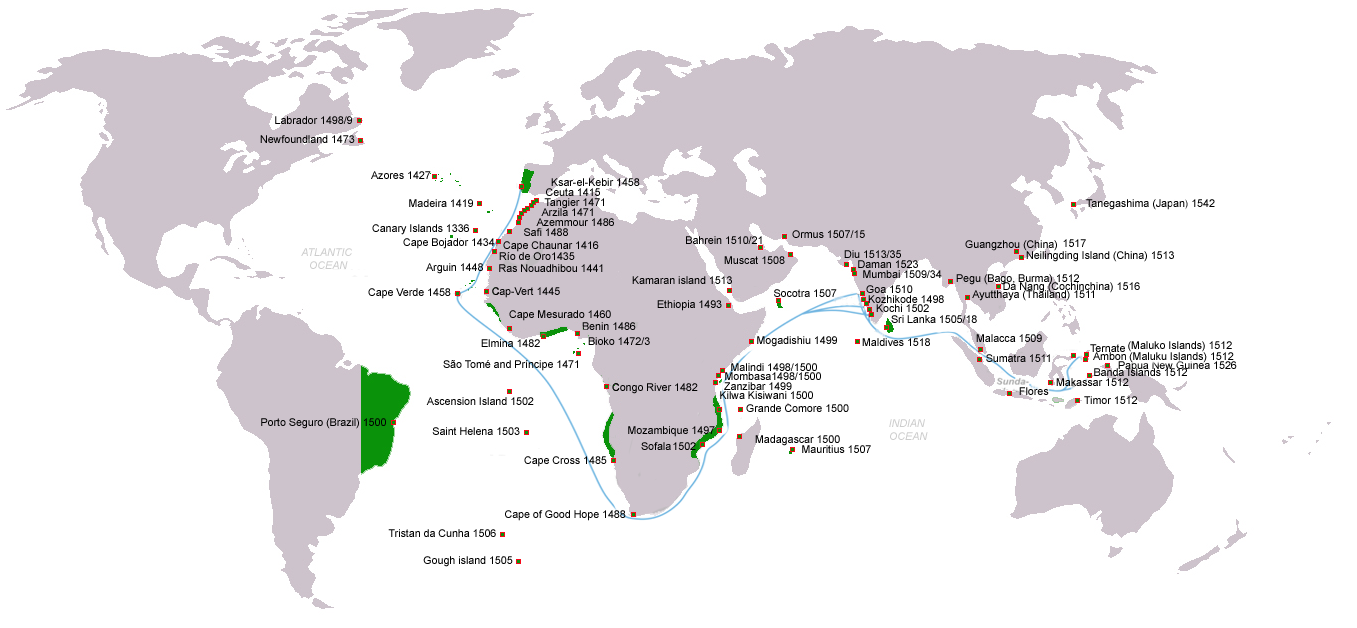
Portuguese discoveries and explorations: first arrival places and dates; main Portuguese spice trade routes in the Indian Ocean (blue); territories of the Portuguese empire under King John III rule (1521–1557) (green)

=== Chronology of the Portuguese discoveries ===
- 1336 — Possible first expedition to the Canary Islands with additional expeditions in 1340 and 1341, though this is disputed.
- 1412 — Prince Henry, the Navigator, orders the first expeditions to the African Coast and Canary Islands.
- 1419 — João Gonçalves Zarco and Tristão Vaz Teixeira discovered Porto Santo island, in the Madeira group.
- 1420 — The same sailors and Bartolomeu Perestrelo discovered the island of Madeira, which at once began to be colonized.
- 1422 — Cape Nao, the limit of Moorish navigation is passed as the African Coast is mapped.
- 1427 — Diogo de Silves discovered the Azores, which was colonized in 1431 by Gonçalo Velho Cabral.
- 1434 — Gil Eanes sailed round Cape Bojador, thus destroying the legends of the ‘Dark Sea’.
- 1434 — the 32 point compass-card replaces the 12 points used until then.
- 1435 — Gil Eanes and Afonso Gonçalves Baldaia discovered Garnet Bay (Angra dos Ruivos) and the latter reached the Gold River (Rio de Ouro).
- 1441 — Nuno Tristão reached Cape White.
- 1443 — Nuno Tristão penetrated the Arguim Gulf. Prince Pedro granted Henry the Navigator the monopoly of navigation, war and trade in the lands south of Cape Bojador.
- 1444 — Dinis Dias reached Cape Green (Cabo Verde).
- 1445 — Álvaro Fernandes sailed beyond Cabo Verde and reached Cabo dos Mastros (Cape Red)
- 1446 — Álvaro Fernandes reached the northern Part of Portuguese Guinea
- 1452 — Diogo de Teive discovers the Islands of Flores and Corvo.
- 1458 — Alvise Cadamosto discovers the first Cape Verde Islands.
- 1460 — Death of Prince Henry, the Navigator. His systematic mapping of the Atlantic reached 8° N on the African Coast and 40° W in the Atlantic (Sargasso Sea) in his lifetime.
- 1461 — Diogo Gomes and António Noli discovered more of the Cape Verde Islands.
- 1461 — Diogo Afonso discovered the western islands of the Cape Verde group.
- 1471 — João de Santarém and Pedro Escobar crossed the Equator. The southern hemisphere was discovered and the sailors began to be guided by a new constellation, the Southern Cross. The discovery of the islands of São Tomé and Príncipe is also attributed to these same sailors.
- 1479 — Treaty of Alcáçovas establishes Portuguese control of the Azores, Guinea, ElMina, Madeira and Cape Verde Islands and Castilian control of the Canary Islands.
- 1482 — Diogo Cão reached the estuary of the Zaire (Congo) and placed a landmark there. Explored 150 km upriver to the Yellala Falls.
- 1484 — Diogo Cão reached Walvis Bay, south of Namibia.
- 1487 — Afonso de Paiva and Pero da Covilhã traveled overland from Lisbon in search of the Kingdom of Prester John. (Ethiopia)
- 1488 — Bartolomeu Dias, crowning 50 years of effort and methodical expeditions, rounded the Cape of Good Hope and entered the Indian Ocean. They had found the "Flat Mountain" of Ptolemy's Geography.
- 1489/92 — South Atlantic Voyages to map the winds
- 1490 — Columbus leaves for Spain after his father-in-law's death.
- 1492 — First exploration of the Indian Ocean.
- 1494 — The Treaty of Tordesillas between Portugal and Spain divided the world into two parts, Spain claiming all non-Christian lands west of a north–south line 370 leagues west of the Azores, Portugal claiming all non-Christian lands east of that line.
- 1495 — Voyage of João Fernandes, the Farmer, and Pedro Barcelos to Greenland. During their voyage they discovered the land to which they gave the name of Labrador (lavrador, farmer)
- 1494 — First boats fitted with cannon doors and topsails.
- 1498 — Vasco da Gama led the first fleet around Africa to India, arriving in Calicut.
- 1498 — Duarte Pacheco Pereira explores the South Atlantic and the South American Coast North of the Amazon River.
- 1500 — Pedro Álvares Cabral discovered Brazil on his way to India.
- 1500 — Gaspar Corte-Real made his first voyage to Newfoundland, formerly known as Terras Corte-Real.
- 1500 — Diogo Dias discovered an island they named after St Lawrence after the saint on whose feast day they had first sighted the island later known as Madagascar
- 1502 — Returning from India, Vasco da Gama discovers the Amirante Islands (Seychelles).
- 1502 — Miguel Corte-Real set out for New England in search of his brother, Gaspar. João da Nova discovered Saint Helena. Fernão de Noronha discovered the island which still bears his name.
- 1503 — On his return from the East, Estêvão da Gama discovered Ascension Island.
- 1505 — Gonçalo Álvares in the fleet of the first viceroy sailed south in the Atlantic to were "water and even wine froze" discovering an island named after him, modern Gough Island
- 1505 — Lourenço de Almeida made the first Portuguese voyage to Ceylon (Sri Lanka) and established a settlement there.
- 1506 — Tristão da Cunha discovered the island that bears his name. Portuguese sailors become the first Europeans to reach Madagascar.
- 1509 — The Bay of Bengal crossed by Diogo Lopes de Sequeira. On the crossing he also reached Malacca.
- 1511 — Duarte Fernandes is the first European to visit the Kingdom of Siam (Thailand), sent by Afonso de Albuquerque after the conquest of Malaca.
- 1512 — António de Abreu discovered Timor island and reached Banda Islands, Ambon Island and Seram. Francisco Serrão reached the Moluccas.
- 1512 — Pedro Mascarenhas discovered the island of Diego Garcia, he also encountered the Mauritius, although he may not have been the first to do so; expeditions by Diogo Dias and Afonso de Albuquerque in 1507 may have encountered the islands. In 1528 Diogo Rodrigues named the islands of Réunion, Mauritius, and Rodrigues the Mascarene Islands, after Mascarenhas.
- 1512 — João de Lisboa and Estevão Frois reached the La Plata estuary or even perhaps the Gulf of San Matias in 42°S in modern Argentina between 1511 and 1514 (1512) according to the manuscript Newen Zeytung auss Pressilandt in the Fugger archives of the time. Christopher de Haro, the financier of the expedition, bears witness to the trip to La Plata (Rio da Prata) and the news of the "White King" to the interior and west, the Inca emperor – and the axe of silver obtained from the natives and offered to the king Manuel I.
- 1513 — The first trading ship to touch the coasts of China, under Jorge Álvares and Rafael Perestrello later in the same year.
- 1517 — Fernão Pires de Andrade and Tomé Pires were chosen by Manuel I of Portugal to sail to China to formally open relations between the Portuguese Empire and the Ming Dynasty during the reign of the Zhengde Emperor.
- 1525 — Aleixo Garcia explored the Rio de la Plata in service to Spain, as a member of the expedition of Juan Díaz de Solís, and later – from Santa Catarina, Brazil – leading an expedition of some Europeans and 2,000 Guaraní Indians, explored Paraguay and Bolivia. Aleixo Garcia was the first European to cross the Chaco and even managed to penetrate the outer defenses of the Inca Empire on the hills of the Andes (near Sucre), in present-day Bolivia. He was the first European to do so, accomplishing this eight years before Francisco Pizarro.
- 1526 — Discovery of New Guinea by Jorge de Meneses
- 1528 — Diogo Rodrigues explores the Mascarene islands, that he names after his countryman Pedro Mascarenhas, he explored and named the islands of Réunion, Mauritius, and Rodrigues
- 1529 — Treaty of Saragossa divides the eastern hemisphere between Spain and Portugal, stipulating that the dividing line should lie 297.5 leagues or 17° east of the Moluccas.
- 1536 — Pedro A. Campos discovers Barbados, and finds it uninhabitable.
- 1542 — The coast of California explored by João Rodrigues Cabrilho.
- 1543 — António Mota, Francisco Zeimoto, and possibly Fernão Mendes Pinto became the first Europeans to reach Japan.
- 1557 — Macau given to Portugal by the Emperor of China as a reward for services rendered against the pirates who infested the China Sea.

(missing data on Ormuz – from Socotra to Basra, including Muscat, Bahrain, islands in Strait of Hormuz, etc.)

== See also ==
- Catholic Church and the Age of Discovery
- Naval history
- List of Portuguese people
- Lusitania
- Portugal
- Portuguese colonization of the Americas
- Portuguese Empire (1415–2002)
- Portuguese people
