= Liceu Ludgero Lima =

Location
- Rua Jonas Wanon; Mindelo; Cape Verde
- Coordinates: 16.8815°N 24.9857°W

Information
- Established: August 12, 1856
- Director: José Cândido
- Teaching staff: 98
- Enrollment: ca. 1,500

Liceu Ludgero Lima is a secondary school in Mindelo, Cape Verde. The school is named after Ludgero Lima, a former employee and fighter for Cape Verdean independence, who died in an aviation accident in March 1975. Since 1968 it is housed in a building on Rua Jonas Wanon, in the neighbourhood Chã de Cemitério, southeast of the city centre, designed by the Portuguese architect Eurico Pinto Lopes.

== History ==
The history of Liceu Ludgero Lima began in the 19th century, at a time when there was only one secondary school outside Portugal, the Liceu de Goa, in Goa, in Portuguese India.

=== Foundation ===
Traditionally, the institution that gave rise to secondary education in Cape Verde is considered to have been the São Nicolau Seminary of Cape Verde, created by law on August 12, 1856, in Ribeira Brava.

By law no. 701, of June 13, 1917, the Ministry of Colonies extinguishes Seminary-High School, then creating the National High School of Cape Verde. On October 8, 1917, by decree no. 3: 435, the Liceu Nacional settled on the island of São Vicente, in Mindelo.

At first it was installed in the house of Senator Cruz, the current Centro Nacional de Artesanato e Design. In 1921 it was moved to the former military barracks in the city centre, the Liceu Velho.

Later, on January 15, 1926, the institution was named as Liceu Central Infante D. Henrique, after publication of the colonial legislative diploma 92.

The school was closed in 1937, and reopened the same year as Liceu Gil Eanes. The Liceu Gil Eanes moved to its current building in 1967.

In 1955, following the visit of the President of the Republic Francisco Craveiro Lopes, the "Secção do Liceu Gil Eanes" was created in Praia.

Until 1968, the institution was located in the Casa Senador Vera Cruz building, in Praça Nova, in Mindelo. The current building was designed by Eurico Pinto Lopes, an architect used to design for tropical regions.

=== Post-independence ===
Through the order of May 19, 1975, of the Ministry of Education, the Liceu Gil Eanes becomes Liceu Ludgero Lima, in honor of Ludgero Lima, a former Liceu employee, who, in 1969, joined the liberation struggle for the independence of Cape Verde. He died on March 23, 1975, victim of a plane crash.

Close to the institution completing one hundred and sixty years, in 2014, the high school headquarters building (building already almost fifty years old) was in a very degraded structure.

== Notable students and staff ==
- Orlanda Amarílis, writer
- Amílcar Cabral, independence activist
- Raul Pires Ferreira Chaves, architect, teacher
- Abílio Duarte, independence activist and political leader
- Humberto Duarte Fonseca, scientist
- António Aurélio Gonçalves, writer
- Jotamont, singer (Jorge Fernandes Monteiro)
- Pedro Pires, later President of Cape Verde

== See also ==
- Education in Cape Verde
- List of buildings and structures in São Vicente, Cape Verde
