= List of universities in Cape Verde =

This is a list of universities in Cape Verde:

== Public universities ==
- University of Cape Verde, Praia
- Universidade de Santiago, Assomada, Praia, Tarrafal

== Private universities ==
- Universidade Tecnica do Atlantico (UTA), Mindelo
- Universidade Intercontinental de Cabo Verde, Praia
- Instituto Superior de Ciências Económicas e Empresariais, Praia
- Instituto Superior de Ciências Jurídicas e Sociais, Praia
- Jean Piaget University of Cape Verde, Praia
- M EIA - Instituto Universitário de Arte Tecnologia e Cultura, Praia
- University of Mindelo, Mindelo
- Universidade Lusófona de Cabo Verde, Praia
