= Lopo Homem =

16th century Portuguese cartographer

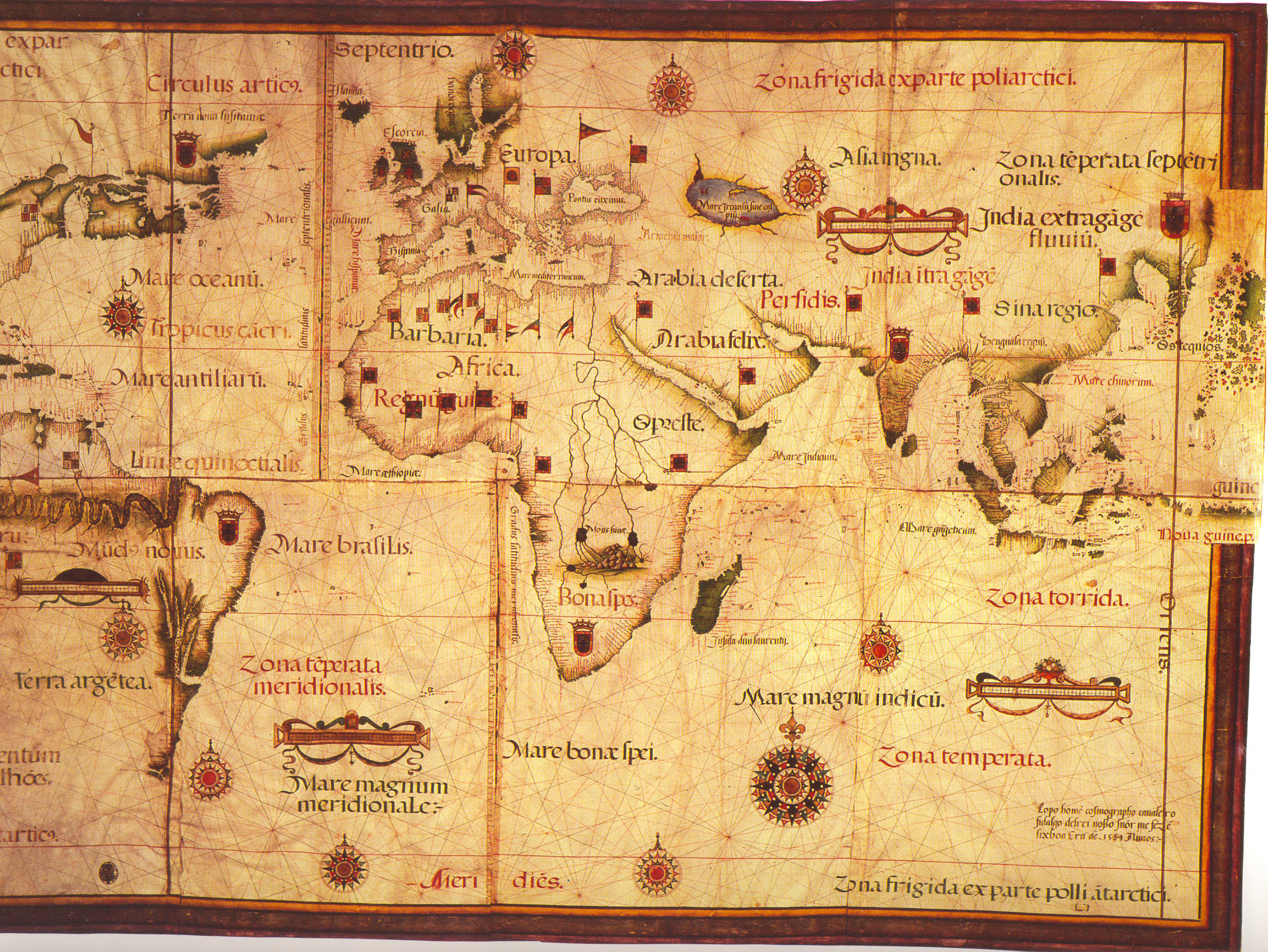
- 1554 Lopo Homem world map
- Born: c. 1497
- Died: c. 1572
- Occupation: Cartographer
- Years active: 1520 - c. 1555

Lopo Homem (c. 1497 - c. 1572) was a 16th-century Portuguese cartographer and cosmographer based in Lisbon and best known for his work on the Miller Atlas.

== Biography ==
"Terra Brasilis", Miller Atlas, 1519, French National Library.

Homem is estimated to have been born c. 1497, possibly into a noble family. He is known to have spent time in Azamor between 1520 and 1522 and in Lisbon in 1565. Beginning in 1517, he served as the crown's official cartographer and was given exclusive rights to "constructing and correcting... nautical compasses." If anyone else attempted to calibrate a ship, they were required to pay Homem, the Master of Nautical Instruments, 20 cruzados. These rights and titles were renewed in 1524 by King João III of Portugal. In 1524, Homem was involved in preliminary negotiations on behalf of the Portuguese crown as an expert witness at the Conferences of Badajoz-Elvas, which aimed to settle a dispute with Castile for the Molucca Islands. For this, he was given a pension of 1200 reais. A letter written by Lopo Homem alluding to the board quarrels over the claims of the two kings on exploration rights remains in the Torre do Tombo.

Homem's earliest known work is a world map, which was discovered in London in 1930. His best-known work is the Miller Atlas, dated 1519, which is thought to be a joint work with Pedro Reinel, Reinel's son Jorge, and António de Holanda. There is, however, some disagreement in the academic community, with others arguing that Homem and de Holanda were the only two who worked on it. The Miller Atlas consists of eight maps over six sheets painted on both sides. It was created using information both from Homem's imagination and from known land masses dating back to Ptolemy. Because of its "luxurious" work and detail, it is thought that King Manuel I of Portugal commissioned it as a state gift for Francis I of France. Homem and the Reineles were the only known cartographers in Lisbon at this time, allowing them to entirely corner the market. In the mid-16th century, Homem criticized inaccurate maps, both for "damag[ing] the geopolitical interests of the Crown... [which] could cause significant territorial losses" and for increasing the probability of shipwrecks and sailor deaths.

In 1531, Lopo Homem was given a lifetime pension of 20,000 reais.

== Works ==
Homem's known works, dated between 1557 and 1578, include 11 or 12 charts and 12 atlases; 7 of the atlases were of Europe and the Mediterranean Sea and 5 were of the world. These include:

- Unnamed map (1519), a map featuring data from recent voyages combined with existing beliefs dating back to Claudius Ptolemy. Some geographic features of the map include a land mass stretching from the southern Atlantic to the southern Indian Oceans and connecting Brazil to the Malacca Peninsula, and Ptolemy's Sinus Magnus (Great Gulf). Homem's map shows the Mundus Novus Brasil in the West joined to the Mundus Novus Terra Incognita in the South and Malaca in the East, all enclosing the Oceanus Meridionalis and Indicum Mare (Atlantic and Indian Oceans). This is apparently an adaptation of Ptolemy’s enclosed Indian Ocean, enlarged following the discovery of a sea route south of Africa by Bartolomeu Dias (1488) and Vasco da Gama (1497). This revised concept was explained by Duarte Pacheco Pereira in Esmeraldo de Situ Orbis (1508) and expressed on Homem’s map. Pereira said: "the Ocean does not surround the earth as the philosophers have declared, but rather the earth surrounds the sea, and it lies in its hollow and centre. And from this I conclude that the Ocean is nothing other than an enormous lake in the hollow of the earth and that the earth and the sea together make up a single roundness". A similar concept is shown in the world map in the c.1553 manuscript of al-Qazwini (see Kujata).
- Miller Atlas (1519), later named after Emmanuel Miller, who purchased it in 1855. The atlas has been in the possession of the National Library of France since 1897. Others who worked on this atlas include Pedro and Jorge Reinel and António de Holanda.
  - "Terra Brasilis" - Southwestern Atlantic Ocean with Brazil. It describes Indigenous Brazilians as "savage and very brutal." This is the first map showing Portuguese trade and has detailed Latin nomenclature, featuring 146 names. The map shows the Brazilian coast from Maranhão to the Rio da Prata and shows Indigenous Brazilians engaging in the export of Brazilwood. Coats of arms over present-day Guyana and Argentina show areas of Portuguese and Spanish colonization.
  - China Sea with the Moluccas. One side shows the Magnus Sinus (the Gulf of Thailand and the South China Sea) and the other shows the China Sea with the Moluccas and also features rhumb lines.
  - Northern Indian Ocean with Insulindia on the Left, and Madagascar on the Right. One side shows the Northern Indian Ocean with Arabia, India, the Red Sea, the Gulf of Aden, the Persian Gulf, the Ganges Delta, and the Nicobar Islands, as well as the equator. The other shows the Southern Indian Ocean with Insulindia and Madagascar.
  - Circular World Map of the Portuguese Hemisphere and Title Page. The cover page includes Catherine de' Medici's coat of arms and Latin text, which in English translates to: "This is the map of the entire world known up to this day, which I myself, Lopo Homem the cartographer, drew with great skill and careful work in the very famous city of Lisbon in the year of our Lord 1519 under the rule of the honored Emanuel King of Lusitania, having collated many other maps both ancient and recent." Gilded four winds are in the corners of the map; and Africa is divided into Libia, Guine, and Ethiopia and is connected to the Arabian Peninsula by a much greater land mass than what exists.
  - The Mediterranean Sea. This map shows European coasts spanning from Jutland to the Caucasus and includes Frisia and the southern coasts of England and Ireland. The farthest west point is Cape Bojador (Ansulim); the Caspian Sea and northern parts of the Red Sea and the Persian Gulf are included. Biblically based features included on the map are the Cross of Golgotha in Jerusalem, the Tables of the Law on Mount Sinai, and the Tower of Babel between the Tigris and Euphrates Rivers.
  - Central Atlantic Ocean with the Azores. One side of the map includes northern Europe, including the British Isles, Scandinavia, Iceland, the northeastern Atlantic Ocean, Orléans, France, Lyon, France, and Worms, Germany. The other side features the Atlantic Ocean, Azores, and Greenland ("Insula Viridis").
  - North Atlantic Ocean. This map shows European coasts from Holland to Málaga; African coasts from Melila to Cape Palmas (now southeast Liberia); and Azores, the British Isles, Canary Islands, and Cape Verde Islands. The American coast spans from Labrador to Acadia (now southeast Maine); Virginia to the Gulf of Mexico ("Terra Bimenes"); and Yucatán and Cuba to the South American New World.
- Unnamed nautical chart (1550). Currently at the Biblioteca Nacional de Portugal. It belonged to King Carlos I of Portugal.
- Unnamed world map (1554). The first map in history to show Argentina. This map built on the ideas of cartographer Sebastian Cabot. It is current at the Museo Galileo in Florence, Italy.

== Family ==
He had at least 4 sons: Diogo and André, both cartographers; Thomas; and António.
