= University of Santiago =

University of Santiago can refer to:

- University of Santiago de Cuba, in Santiago de Cuba, Cuba
- University of Santiago, Chile, in Santiago, Chile
- University of Santiago de Compostela, in Santiago de Compostela, Galicia, Spain
- Universidade de Santiago, in Assomada on the island of Santiago, Cape Verde
