= Liceu Velho =

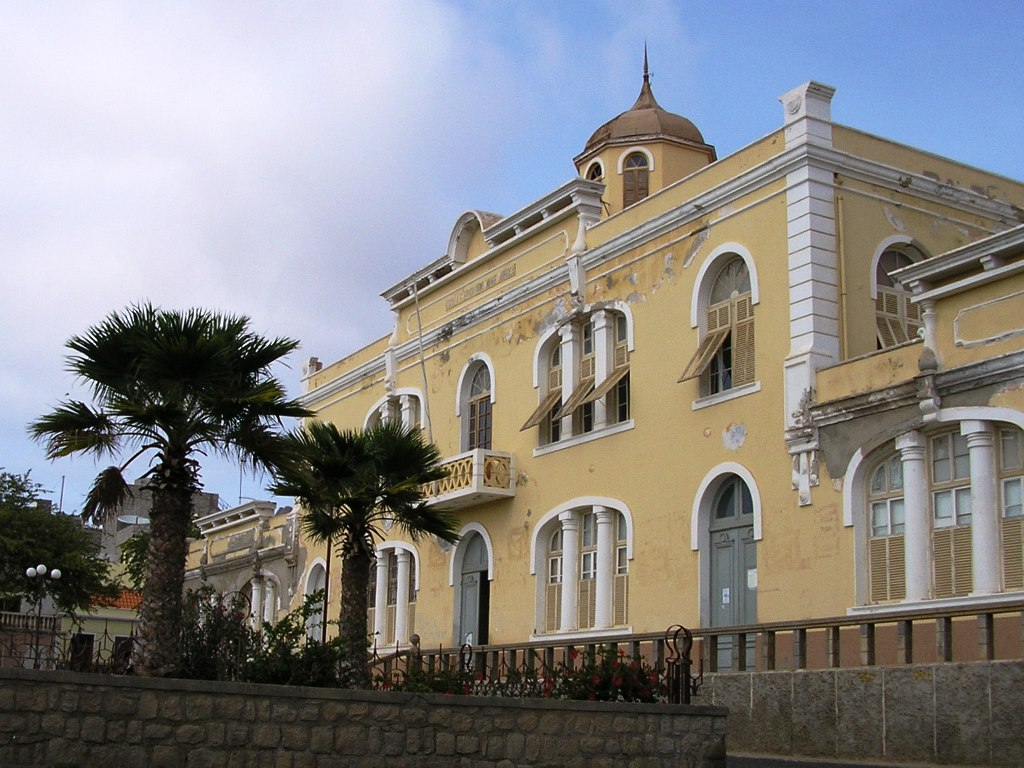
- Interactive map of the Liceu Velho area
- Former names: Quartel Militar, Liceu Nacional Infante D. Henrique, Liceu Gil Eanes, Escola Jorge Barbosa

General information
- Location: Mindelo, Cape Verde
- Coordinates: 16.8861°N 24.9859°W
- Current tenants: Mindelo Escola Internacional de Arte
- Construction started: 1859
- Completed: 1873

Website
- meia.edu.cv

Liceu Velho is a building in the eastern part of the city centre of Mindelo, Cape Verde. It is situated on Praça Dr. Duarte Silva, between Avenida Fernando Ferreira Fortes and Rua Franz Fanon, east of the Palácio do Povo. Since 2008, it houses the art school M_EIA (Mindelo Escola Internacional de Arte), officially Instituto Universitário de Arte, Tecnologia e Cultura. It is also one of the locations of the School of Business and Governance (ENG) of the University of Cape Verde.

== History ==
Constructed between 1859 and 1873, the building was intended to serve as military barracks, the Quartel Militar. It was a residence of the Portuguese colonial governor of Cape Verde. In 1921 the Liceu Nacional Infante Dom Henrique was installed in the building, making Mindelo the centre of education of Cape Verde. The school was closed in 1937, and reopened the same year as Liceu Gil Eanes. After 1968, when this school moved to a new building, it housed the Escola Preparatória Jorge Barbosa.

== Notable students ==
- Orlanda Amarílis, writer
- Amílcar Cabral, independence activist

== See also ==
- Education in Cape Verde
- List of buildings and structures in São Vicente, Cape Verde
