= Jotamont =

- Born: Jorge Fernandes Monteiro; 1 October 1912; Atlantic Ocean off Cape Verde
- Died: 21 November 1998 (aged 86)
- Genres: Morna, coladeira
- Occupations: Musician, composer
- Instrument: Vocals

Jotamont or Jorge Fernandes Monteiro (October 1, 1912 - November 21, 1998) was a Cape Verdean musician and composer. He was born on a boat bound for the United States of America, where his parents hoped to find better living conditions. He attended the Gil Eanes lyceum in Mindelo and a Lisbon conservatory. He was a virtuoso on the trumpet.

== Mornas ==
Jotamont composed a number of mornas, a music and dance genre from Cape Verde. The English translation of the titles is in brackets.

- São Cente (Saint Vicent)
- Mindelo nha terra (Mindelo, Our Land)
- 'Nha terra bô ca tá imaginá
- Fidjo Magoado
- Êsse ê quê Mindelo nôs querido cantim
- Dez grãozinhos de terra
- Lolinha
- Nôs Mãe
- Engenheiro humano (Baptista de Sousa)

== Books ==
- Música Caboverdeana - Mornas for the piano, 1987
- Mornas e contra-tempos - Coladeras from Cabo Verde, 1987
- Músicas de Cabo Verde - Mornas from Eugénio Tavares; transcripts for Jótamont, 1987
- Música Caboverdeana - Mornas from Francisco Xavier da Cruz, 1987
