= Maria Baptista Soares =

- Born: November 15, 1928 (age 97); Cape Verde
- Occupations: Sociologist, political activist

Maria Baptista Soares (born November 15, 1928) is a Cape Verdean sociologist and a political activist.

She took part mainly for her work on different communities of peripherical and polemic theme especially on subaltern and neocolonialism.

An urban sociologist, she wrote on social relations in the fringes of globalization with the same rigor which it defends the creation of a territorial identity and partly on the fortification of horizontalities. Founded in April 2008 in São Paulo, Brazil, the Centro Popular Latinoamericano de Estudos Territoriais (CEPLAET, the Latin American Territorial Studies People's Center), following the Portuguese counterpart but without the theoretical and methodological assumptions on the discussions related to Latin American society.

== Works ==
- Fragmentos [Fragments] - Sociedade Marginal. University of Cape Verde, Praia, 1995.
- América Latina e o território virtual [Latin America and its Virtual Territory]. ISCTE, Lisboa, 1998.
- Metamorfóses do Habitat. Caminho, University of Évora/University of Cape Verde, Évora/Praia, 2003.
