= Eurídice Monteiro =

Cape Verdean political scientist, sociologist and writer

- Education: Harvard Kennedy School; Bridgewater State University; University of Coimbra (PhD)
- Occupations: Political scientist, sociologist, newspaper columnist, feminist writer and politician
- Employer: University of Cape Verde
- Organization(s): The International Association of Social Sciences and Humanities in Portuguese Language
- Website: https://www.euridicemonteiro.com/

Eurídice Furtado Monteiro is a Cape Verdean political scientist, sociologist, writer and politician. She served as Secretary of State for Higher Education in the Government of Cape Verde from May 2021 to February 2025. Her novels are released under the name "Eurydice."

== Biography ==
Monteiro studied a diploma in Education at the Harvard Kennedy School of Harvard University in Cambridge, Massachusetts, United States, and a diploma in Public Management at Bridgewater State University in Bridgewater, Massachusetts, United States. She was awarded a scholarship from the Portuguese government and studied an undergraduate degree at the University of Coimbra, Coimbra, Portugal. She then studied a PhD in sociology at the same institution.

Monteiro is Professor and Researcher in Political and Social Studies at the University of Cape Verde. She was president of The International Association of Social Sciences and Humanities in Portuguese Language (Portuguese: Associação Internacional De Ciências Sociais E Humanas Em Língua Portuguesa, AILPcsh). In 2023, she presided over the second Interregional Pan-African Conference of Scientific and Plurilingual Africa, AUF (French: Agence universitaire de la Francophonie).

Monteiro served as Secretary of State for Higher Education in Cape Verde from May 2021 to February 2025. While in post, she aimed to improve conditions for scientific research and to strengthen language skills in English and French. The position of Secretary of State for Higher Education was abolished by the government in February 2025.

== Writing ==
Monteiro has written political commentary and has produced both fictional books and academic research publications. Her novels are released under the name "Eurydice."

In 2009, Monterio released the book Women, democracy and post-colonial challenges: an analysis of women's political participation in Cape Verde (Portuguese: Mulheres, democracia e desafios pós-coloniais : uma análise da participação política das mulheres em Cabo Verde), highlighting the underrepresentation of women in decision-making in the country and the achievements of women in the field. In 2015, she released the book Between the Lords of the Islands and the Discontented: Identity, Class and Gender in the Structuring of the Political Field in Cape Verde (Brazilian Portuguese: Entre os Senhores das Ilhas e as Descontentes: Identidade, Classe e Género na Estruturação do Campo Político em Cabo Verde). In 2019, she released the book The Praise of Democracy (Portuguese: O elogío da democracia).

In 2021, Monteiro released the novel The Beach of Clandestine Love (Portuguese: A Praia dos Amores Clandestinos). This was followed by her 2025 novel Somewhere (Brazilian Portuguese: Em Algum Lugar), which explores the rise of artificial intelligence, the use of digital technologies and the democratization of higher education.

In 2025, Monteiro released the bilingual theatre play Pai di Fidju and Women of Steel (Portuguese: Pai di Fidju ku Mudjeris di Txunbu), which included both Cape Verdean Creole and French, in commemoration of the fiftieth anniversary of the independence of Cape Verde from colonial rule by Portugal.
