= Georgina Mello =

Cape Verdean economist

- Born: 1 December 1953
- Died: 7 October 2023 (aged 69); Portugal

Georgina Maria Augusta Benrós de Mello (1 December 1953 – 7 October 2023) was a Cape Verdean economist and director-general of the Community of Portuguese Language Countries from 2014 to 2020.

== Biography ==
=== Education ===
Georgina Benrós de Mello was born in the island of São Vicente in Cape Verde. After her education in Paul in the island of Santo Antão, she studied economics at the Instituto Superior de Economia e Gestão in Lisbon. After she received her license, she attended at CENFA in Cape Verde, FUNDAP in Brazil and the Graduate School of Public and International Affairs at the University of Pittsburgh in western Pennsylvania. Later, she graduated in tourist and development studies at the University of Cape Verde with a work entitled "Virtual Museums of the Countryside of Cape Verde: For an Alternative Touristic Model" ("Museu virtual de paisagens de Cabo Verde – Por um modelo alternativo de turismo")

=== Career ===
After finishing her studies, she worked as an economist, she travelled to East Timor where she was an agent for investitures and exports.

=== Director-general of the Community of Portuguese Language Countries ===
In February 2014, she became director-general of the Community of Portuguese Language Countries. She succeeded the chairman from Guinea-Bissau Hélder Vaz Lopes. In February 2020, she was succeeded as director-general by Armindo de Brito Fernandes of São Tomé and Príncipe.

In 2015, Mello received a Women's Award, an award for outstanding achievement of Portuguese women.
