= Diogo Homem =

Portuguese cartographer

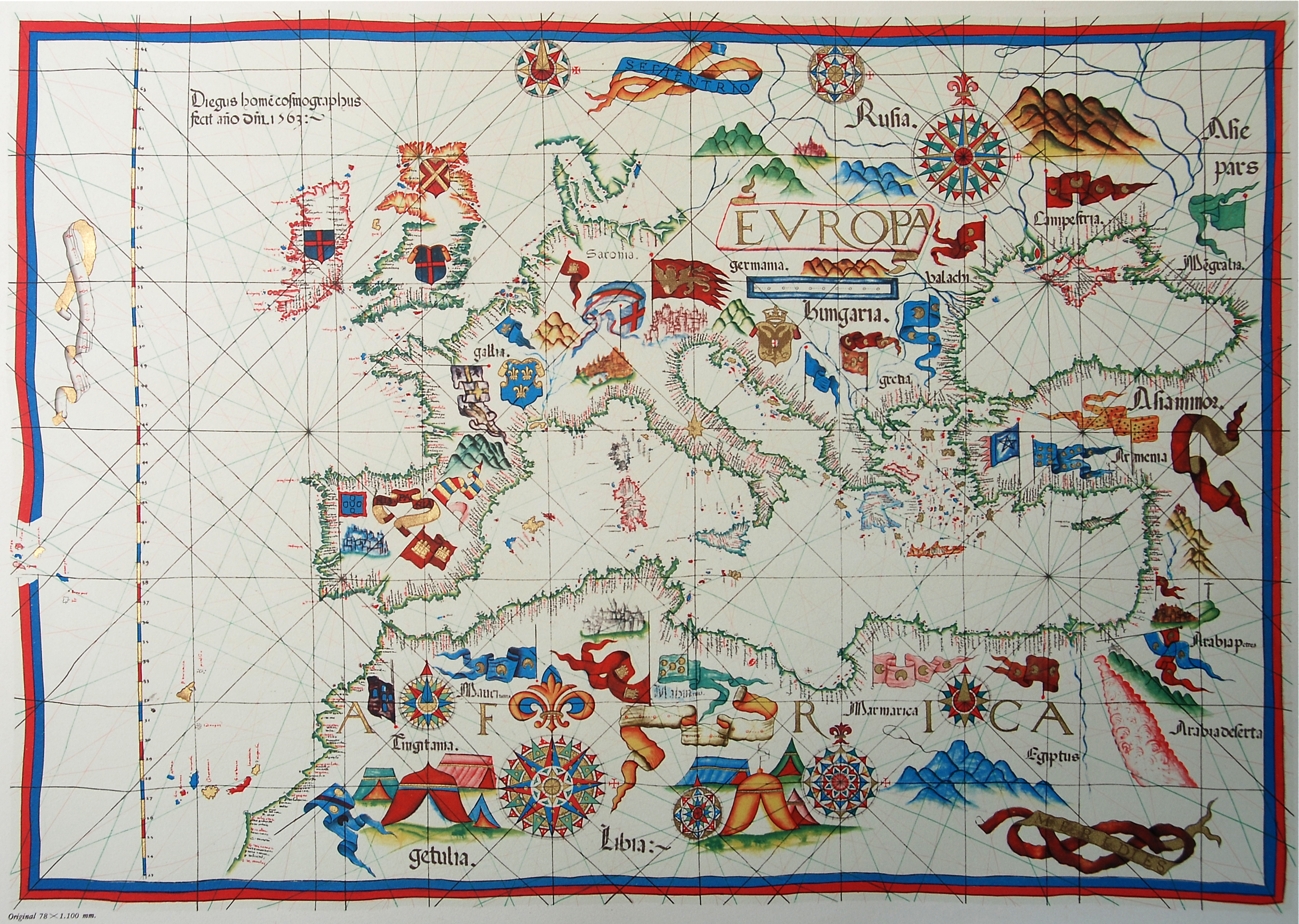
Portolan chart of the Mediterranean by Diogo Homem, 1563. Biblioteca Nazionale, Florence

Diogo Homem (1521–1576) was a Portuguese cartographer, son of Lopo Homem and member of a family of cartographers.

Condemned for murder, he was exiled to Africa from Portugal in 1545, appearing in England a couple of years later. He subsequently lived in Venice, producing numerous manuscript atlases and charts, many of them of the Mediterranean.

The work of Diogo Homem is of a graphical quality and beauty, being kept in Italy, Austria, United Kingdom, France, the US, and Portugal.
