= Miller Atlas =

1519 Portuguese illustrated atlas

"Terra Brasilis" by Pedro Reinel and Lopo Homem, Miller Atlas, in the French National Library in Paris

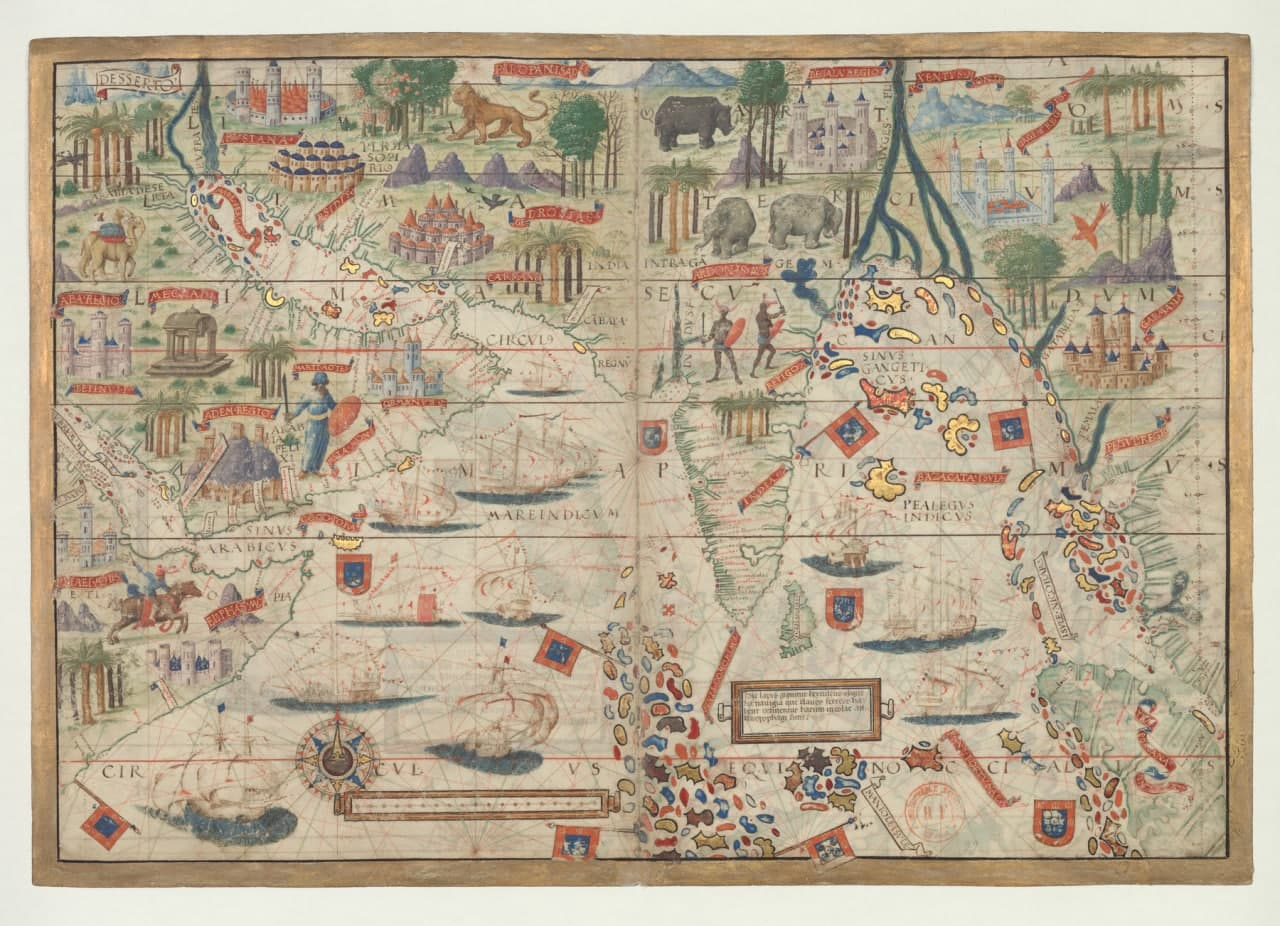
Map of the Atlas Miller showing the Indian Ocean

The Miller Atlas, also known as Lopo Homem-Reineis Atlas, is a richly illustrated Portuguese partial world atlas dated from 1519, including a dozen charts. It is a joint work of the cartographers Lopo Homem, Pedro Reinel and Jorge Reinel, and illustrated by miniaturist António de Holanda.

The regions represented are the North Atlantic Ocean, Northern Europe, the Azores Archipelago, Madagascar, Horn of Africa, the Indian Ocean, Indonesia, the China Sea, the Moluccas, Brazil and the Mediterranean Sea. It was acquired by the librarian Bénigne Emmanuel Clement Miller in 1855 at a bookseller in Santarém, Portugal, hence the name Miller Atlas. In 1897, his widow sold it to the National Library of France, where it has stayed ever since.

It stands out for details of the map 'Terra Brasilis', less than twenty years after the landing of Pedro Álvares Cabral. It is thought to have been an offering from King Manuel I of Portugal to Francis I of France. The charts included and its authoring raised great controversy among scholars, particularly a world map closed to the Pacific Ocean, which has been interpreted as an attempt to dissuade the circumnavigation that Ferdinand Magellan then prepared in Seville, in the court of Charles I of Spain.

It is argued by Robert J. King that Homem's map represented a stage in cartographical history when Ptolemy's enclosed Indian Ocean was enlarged to become an enclosed world ocean until, following Magellan's expedition, it was recognized that the ocean was much larger than the authority of the Biblical Fourth Book of Esdras had ascribed to it, and that indeed it did surround the continental parts of the Earth. The configuration of the map, with the world ocean, under the names occeanus meridionalis and indicum mare, enclosed by the three classical continents, Europe, Asia and Africa, and the New World including the austral terra incognita, was apparently drawn from the description of the world given by Duarte Pacheco Pereira in 1508 and set out in his since lost map. Other world maps of this type are that shown on the 1525 tapestry by Bernaert van Orley and Georg Wezeler, and on the 1513 world map of Piri Reis.

Its title page bears a later inscription with the arms of Catherine de Medici with the text, "Hec est universi orbis ad hanc usqz diem cogniti / tabula quam ego Lupus homo Cosmographus / in clarissima Ulisipone civitate Anno domini nostri / Millessimo quigentessimo decimo nono jussu / Emanuelis incliti lusitanie Regis collatis pluribs / aliis tam vetustorum qz recentiorum tabulis mag / na industria et dilligenti labore depinxi."
