= Pedro Reinel =

Portuguese cartographer

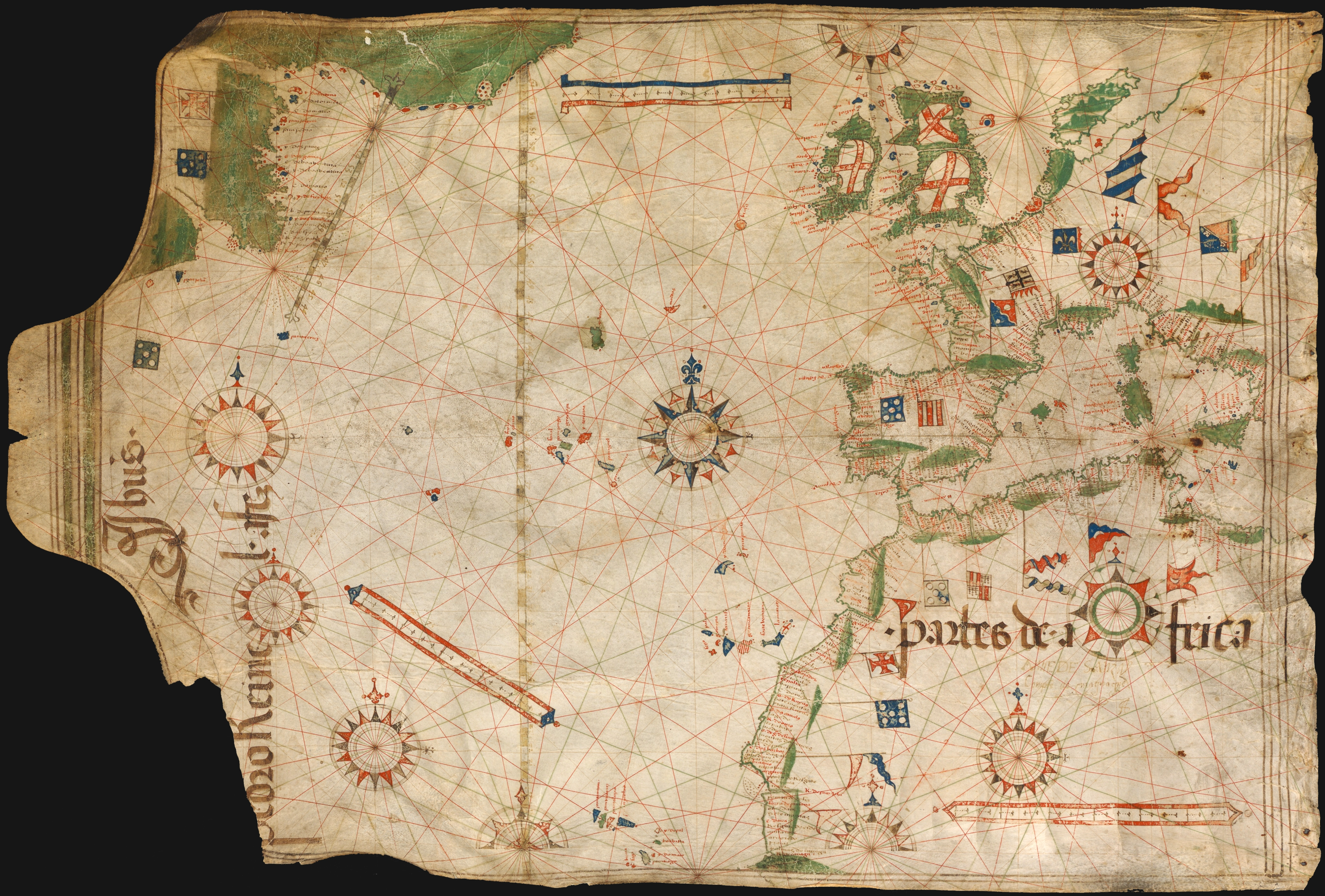
- Nautical chart by Reinel, c. 1504.
- Occupation: Cartographer

Pedro Reinel (fl. 1485 – 1540) was a Portuguese cartographer. Between 1485 and 1519 Reinel served three Portuguese kings: João II, Manuel I and João III. He and his son, Jorge Reinel, were among the most renowned cartographers of their era, a period when European knowledge of geography and cartography were expanding rapidly. There is some evidence he was of African descent. Historian Rafael Moreira believes Reinel's father was an ivory carver brought from West Africa to serve in the royal workshops.

Reinel was the author of one of the oldest signed Portolan charts, tentatively dated about 1485. This nautical chart depicts the western Mediterranean and the African coasts extending as far as the Congo River. It includes the recently completed first voyage of exploration made by Diogo Cão in 1482–1484. The African coast is drawn in two distinct sections: first is a conventional tracing of the Atlantic coast as far as Cabo Corço where the map runs out of space. The remainder of the coast down to the Congo is drawn in the interior of the African continent, an unusual approach that has caused much debate among historians.

His Atlantic Chart (c. 1504) is one of the first to include a scale of latitudes and also contains an early depiction of North America based on the explorations of Gaspar Corte-Real. Reinel demonstrated an understanding of magnetic variation with the use of two different meridians; one closely approximated true north while a second one, placed near Labrador was tilted by 22 degrees to account for the significant variation that early explorers had found when using their compasses. The map also was the first to depict a wind rose with a clearly drawn fleur-de-lys.

With his son Jorge Reinel, and cartographer Lopo Homem, he participated in the construction of the well-known Miller Atlas (1519). The exceptional artwork in the atlas was the work of Dutch miniaturist Antonio de Holanda.

In addition to some of his better known maps, Reinel also authored a chart of the Mediterranean, c. 1500; two charts of the Indian Ocean, ca. 1517 and 1518; a chart of the southern hemisphere c. 1522; and an Atlantic chart, ca. 1535.

Although Reinel and his son worked almost exclusively in Lisbon, they traveled briefly to Seville in 1519 to collaborate on a globe and charts in preparation for the upcoming Magellan expedition sponsored by Spain. In 1524, Reidel participated on the Badajoz-Elvas Junta, a conference organized to discuss whether the Molucca Islands were on the Spanish or Portuguese side of the line of demarcation established by the Treaty of Tordesillas. In 1528, King João III authorized an annual pension of 15,000 reis to Reinel. A contemporary reference indicates Reinel was still making charts in 1540.

He has a Portuguese postage stamp in his honour.

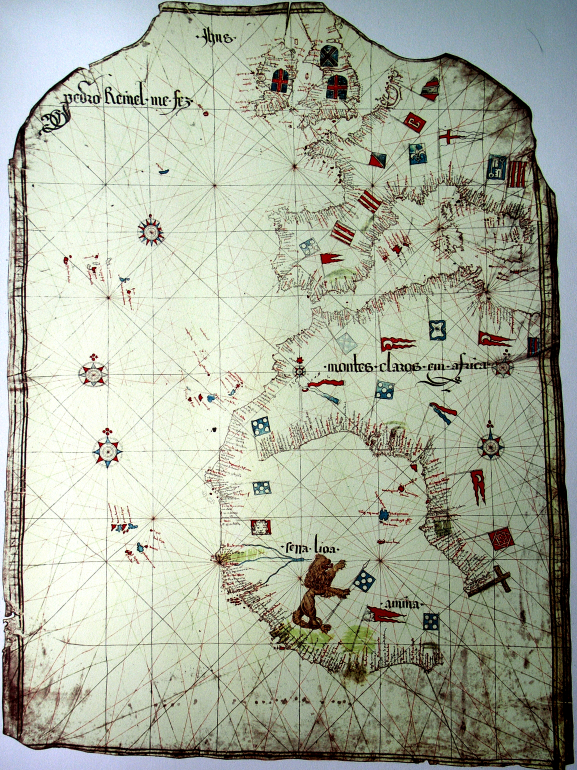
Pedro Reinel, (c.1485). Archives départementales de la Gironde, Bordeaux

Reinel compass rose

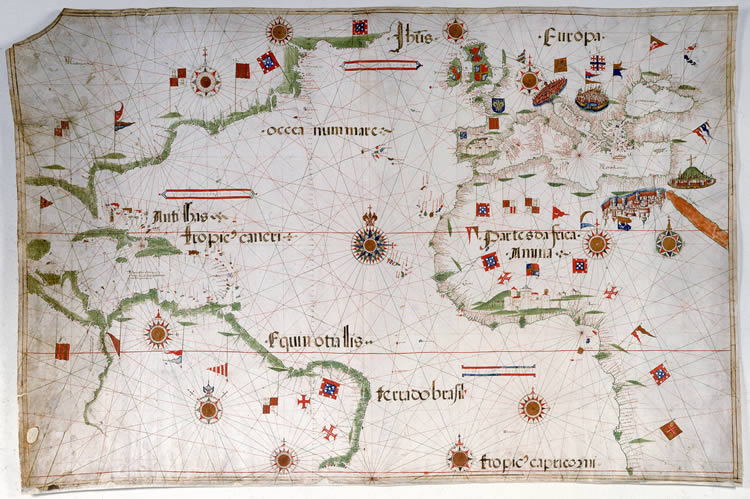
Pedro Reinel, North Atlantic (1535)

"Terra Brasilis", Miller Atlas, 1519, French National Library in Paris

== Bibliography ==
- Alegria, Maria Fernanda (2007). "38 - Portuguese Cartography in the Renaissance". In Woodward, David (ed.). The History of Cartography, Volume 3, Part 1 (PDF). Chicago: University of Chicago Press. pp. 975–1068.
- Cortesão, Armando (1936). "A Hitherto Unrecognized Map by Pedro Reinel in the British Museum". The Geographical Journal. 87 (6): 518–524. doi:10.2307/1786295. ISSN 0016-7398. JSTOR 1786295.
- Marques, Alfredo Pinheiro (1989). "The Dating of the Oldest Portuguese Charts". Imago Mundi. 41: 87–97. ISSN 0308-5694. JSTOR 1151135.
- Moreira, Rafael (2015). "Pedro e Jorge Reinel (at.1504-60). Dois cartógrafos negros na côrte de d. Manuel de Portugal (1495-1521)". Terra Brasilis (Nova Série). Revista da Rede Brasileira de História da Geografia e Geografia Histórica (in Portuguese) (4). doi:10.4000/terrabrasilis.1209. ISSN 1519-1265.
- Siebold, Jim. "The Atlas Miller" (PDF). My Old Maps.
- Taylor, E. G. R. (1939). "Hudson's Strait and the Oblique Meridian". Imago Mundi. 3: 48–52. ISSN 0308-5694. JSTOR 1149918.
- Wolff, Hans, ed. (1992). America : Early Maps of the New World. Munich: Prestel. ISBN 3-7913-1232-4. OCLC 28067909.
