= University of Santiago (Cape Verde) =

Private university in Cape Verde

Universidade de Santiago
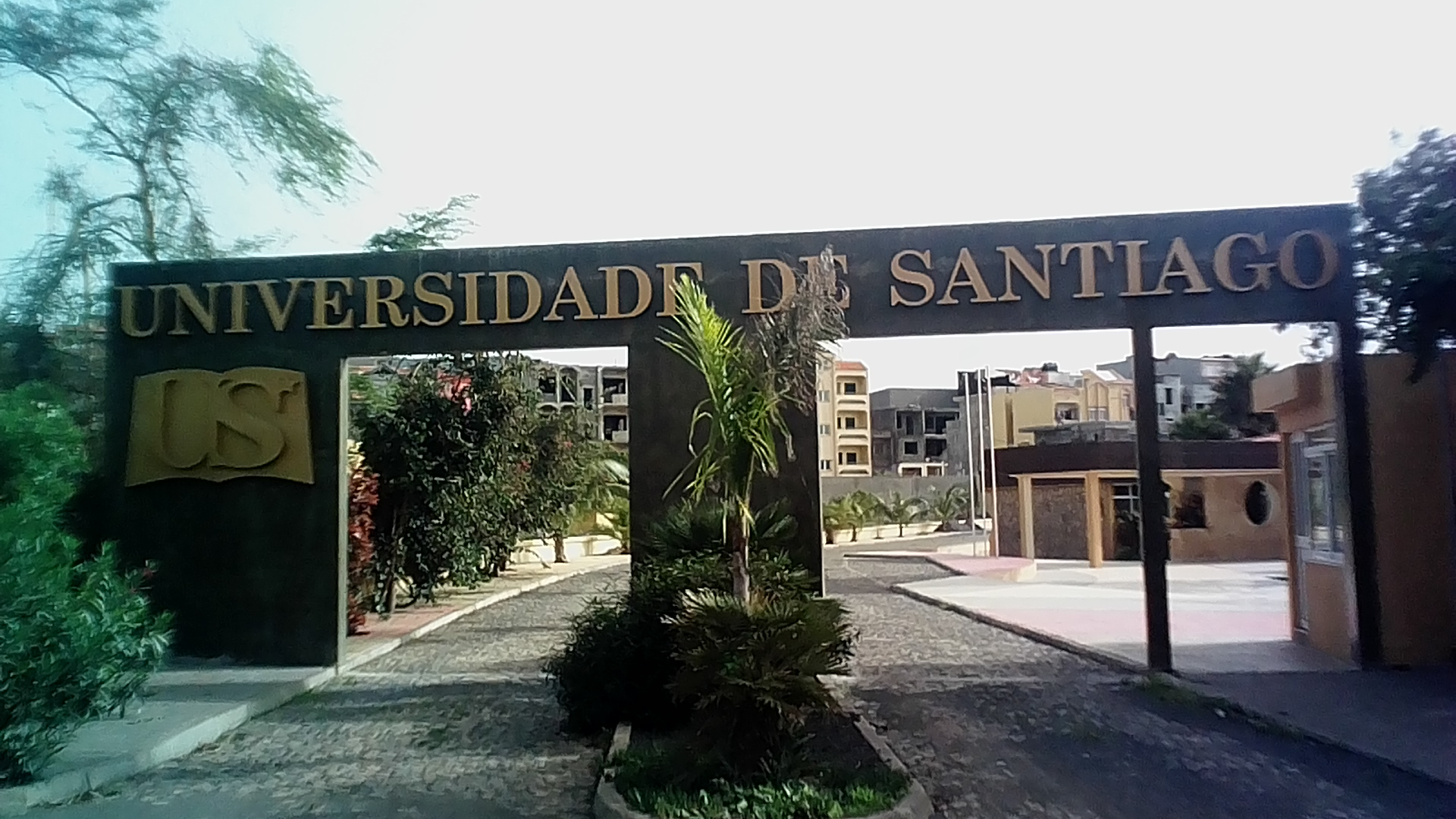
- Motto: "O futuro ao teu alcance"
- Type: Private university
- Established: November 24, 2008; 17 years ago
- President: Luis Rodrigues
- Rector: Gabriel António Monteiro Fernandes
- Academic staff: 85
- Students: ≈ 900
- Location: Assomada, Cape Verde; 15.0956°N 23.6627°W
- Campus: Assomada, Praia, Tarrafal
- Website: us.edu.cv

The Universidade de Santiago (abbreviated as US) is a private university in Cape Verde. It was established in November 2008. The main campus is in Assomada in the middle of the Island of Santiago.

There are two satellite campuses, one in Praia (subdivision Prainha) and another one in Tarrafal. It is one of the eight existing universities in Cape Verde; it was established on November 24, 2008. Since its opening in 2008, it has been run by the current rector Gabriel António Monteiro Fernandes, who holds a doctorate in sociology.

As of August 2018, the university of Santiago offers nineteen (17) undergraduate degrees, and seven (7) graduate (master's degrees) degrees. In addition, it offers vocational degrees, such as multimedia development, electromechanics studies and solar power system, and rural tourism and ecology.

== Campuses ==
Assomada: in the first two years after its establishment in 2008, the university was located at Rua 5 de Julho in Assomada. In 2010 it moved to the present campus in Bolanha, a subdivision in the east of Assomada. The Assomada campus also houses the university administration.

Praia: in 2012, the Praia campus was established at the Seminário São José in the subdivision of Prainha. It houses the College of Technology and Management (Escola Superior de Tecnologias e Gestão - ESTG).

Tarrafal: this campus opened in June 2013, and houses the College of Tourism, Businesses and Administration (Escola Superior de Turismo, Negócios e Administração - ESTNA).

== Courses ==
Below are the 4-year courses (majors) offered at the University of Santiago:

=== Department of Educational Sciences, Philosophy and Letters ===
- Degree in Education Sciences
- Degree in Journalism and Enterprise Communications
- Degree in Natural Science and Mathematic Studies
- Degree in History and Geography Sciences
- Degree in Portuguese-French Language Studies
- Degree in Portuguese-English Language Studies
- Degree in French Language Studies
- Degree in English Language Studies
- Degree in Philosophy

=== Department of Health Sciences, Environment and Technology ===
- Degree in Nursing
- Degree in Geography and Spatial Planning
- Degree in Information and Communications Technology
- Degree in Nutrition and Food Quality
- Degree in Management Information
- Degree in Engineering Information

=== Department of Economic Sciences and Businesses ===
- Degree in Accounting and finance
- Degree in Economy
- Degree in Enterprise Management
- Degree in Marketing and Multimedia
- Degree in Public Relations and Business Communications
- Degree in Human Resource Management

=== Department of Juridicial and Social Sciences ===
- Law Degree
- Degree in History
- Degree in Social Services and Public politics
- Degree in Sociology

== Research ==
In 2013, the Research and Development Institute (Instituto de Pesquisa e Desenvolvimento – IPED), an institutional organ created by guide, management and encourage the development of quality on scientific research, at an institutional level.

The university still keeps, the research and scientific dissemination, as the following academic reviews:

- Lantuna – Capeverdean Review on Education, Philosophy and Letters (named after a traditional instrument of the island)
- Juridicial Review of Universidade de Santiago
- Capeverdean Review on Social Sciences

== Extension ==
The level of its university extension keeps the following projects:

- Projecto Grandes Dossiers Cabo Verde (Great Dossiers of Cape Verde)
- Project “Nha Skola Nha Kaza”
- Programa Rotas do Arquipélago (Routes of the Archipelago Program)
- Projecto Santiago Solidário (Project Solidarity Santiago)
- Projecto US Comunidades

== See also ==
- Jean Piaget University of Cape Verde
- University of Cape Verde - the national level university
- University of Mindelo or São Vicente - located in Mindelo on the island of São Vicente - it is also the university for the Barlavento Islands
