= Jorge Reinel =

Jorge Reinel (c. 1502 – after 1572) born in Lisbon was a Portuguese cartographer and instructor in cartography, son of the well-known cartographer Pedro Reinel. In 1519 in Seville he participated in the maps designed for the trip of his countryman Ferdinand Magellan, and his depiction of the Maluku Islands served as a basis for Spanish claims to the islands. He had trained many pupils in the art of cartography such as Portuguese Diogo Ribeiro.

== Biography ==
He was the son of Portuguese cartographer Pedro Reinel. After a fight with a priest named Pero Anes he went to Spain, where in Seville in 1519 he participated in the preparations for the trip of his countryman Ferdinand Magellan. His father came to get him to return to Portugal, but Jorge could not return before finishing a map and a globe that he had undertaken to do, so Pedro helped him.

The location of the Maluku Islands (or Molucca Islands) in these charts was a cause of dispute between Portugal and Spain: Reinel maps were used to support the claims of the Spanish monarchy to the spice-producing Molucca Islands, saying that the islands were located in their domains by the Treaty of Tordesillas. He also produced maps of the west coast of Africa, the North Atlantic, the South Atlantic.

In Portugal, Jorge Reinel served king John III of Portugal as a master of charts and needles (compass), and was granted an annual pension of 10 reais starting in 1528.
