= Gil Eanes =

Portuguese navigator and explorer

Gil Eannes
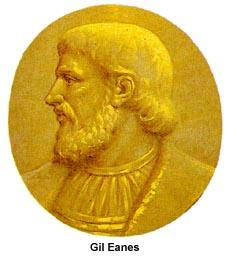
- Born: Lagos, Kingdom of Portugal
- Other names: Eannes, Gilianez
- Occupations: Navigator and explorer
- Known for: First person to sail beyond Cape Bojador

Gil Eanes (or Eannes, in the old Portuguese spelling; Portuguese pronunciation: [ˈʒil iˈɐnɨʃ]) was a 15th-century Portuguese navigator and explorer. He should not be confused with the harbourmaster active in Lisbon in 1433 with the same name.

== Early life ==
Gil Eanes was born in Lagos. Little is known about his personal life prior to his role in the Portuguese Age of Discovery, and was considered a household servant and squire of the Infante Henry the Navigator. A man named Gil Eanes is mentioned as the master of two horse transport ships working for the Portuguese Crown appearing in Southampton in 1421, it is impossible to confirm if this is the Gil Eanes who would later explore past Cape Bojador however it is likely. He was a native of Lagos on which he based his sea voyages, in the southern Algarve.

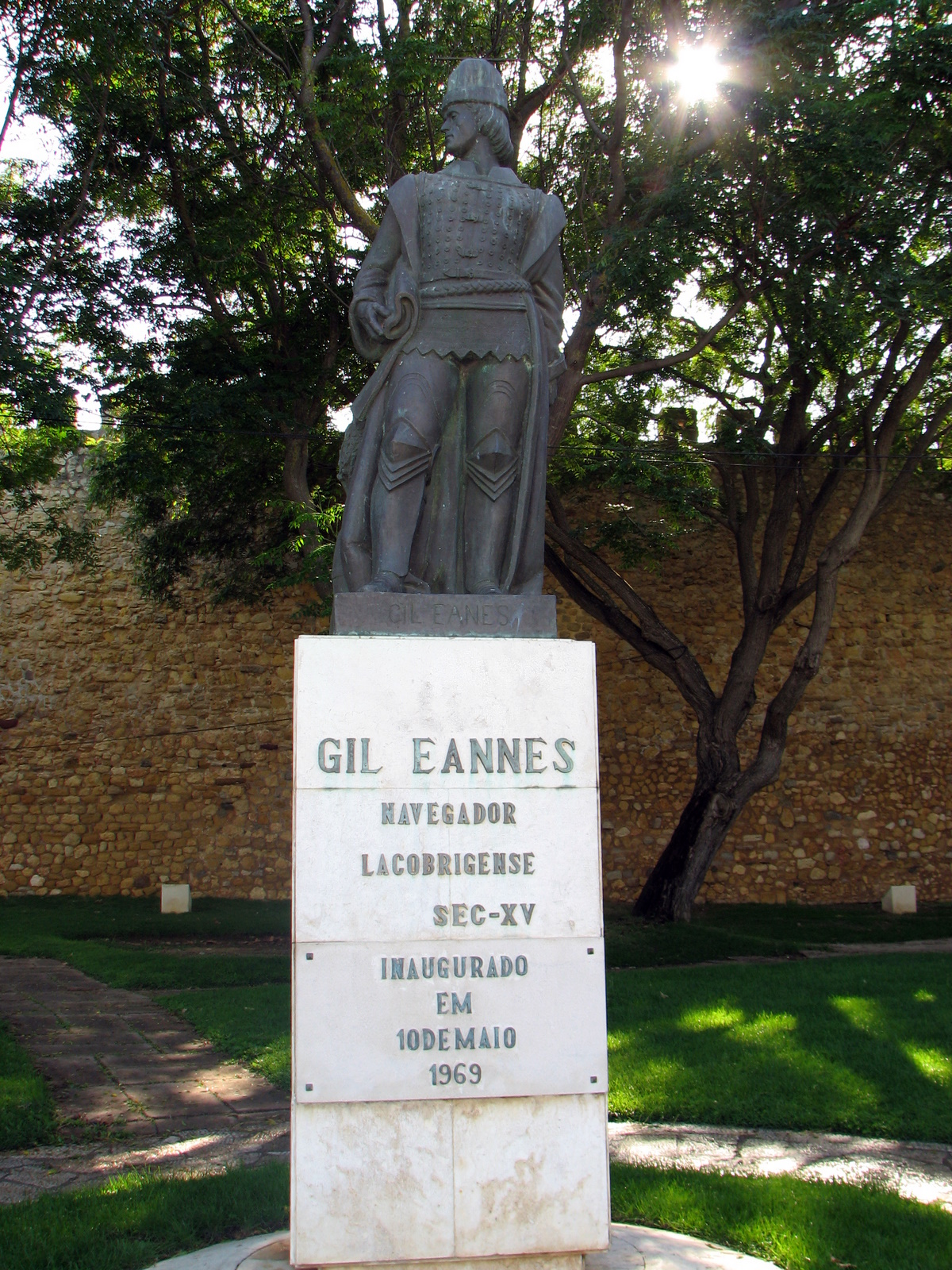
Statue of Gil Eanes in his native town: the city of Lagos

== Expeditions South Of Bojadour ==
Gil Eanes was one of many men enlisted by Prince Henry the Navigator in the effort to round Cape Bojadour, then the limit of the known world. In 1433, the twelfth year of such attempts, Prince Henry gave Eanes a ship and a mission to go past Cape Bojadour to discover what lay beyond, something which none of the previous explorers had successfully pulled off. Cape Bojadour in addition to being the edge of the known world at the time was characterized by shallow reefs extending well offshore, strong winds, and strong waves which would make passing the obstacle close to shore nearly impossible.

Sailing from Lagos, Portugal, Eanes made an unknown number of voyages along the west coast of Africa, before being driven west towards the Canary Islands. In the islands he captured some natives and returned with them as captives to Sagres, excusing his failure by recounting the dangers of the trip. His return was greeted with reserve and coldness in the court of Prince Henry, who had expected the navigator to succeed in rounding the Cape. Eanes hoped to return to favour in the following year, if the Prince would favour him with a second expedition. In 1434, his barquentine-caravel and crew was able to sail beyond Cape Bojador and return to Sagres via a volta do mar, a circular sea current that required ships to pass far from the coast and navigate back successfully. Upon his return he would report the conditions of the water, land and ease of navigation beyond the Cape, and bringing with him some wild roses to prove that they had succeeded in their expedition. The discovery of a passable route around Cape Bojador, as well as the successful return from deep into the Atlantic Ocean marked the beginning of the Portuguese exploration of Africa.

Eanes made another voyage, with Afonso Gonçalves Baldaia, in 1435 who sailed alongside Eanes' ship in a second ship. They sailed about 30 leagues (144 km), or even 50 leagues (240 km) south of Cape Bojador and reached the African coast. Although they did not discover any inhabitants immediately, they did find traces of a human presence, during a voyage that was considered favourable. They named the bay in which they anchored Angra dos Ruivos (Cove of Reds), for the abundance of fish (resembling gurnets) that they caught in the waters.

== Slave Raid of 1444 ==
Gil Eanes makes another recorded voyage in 1444 as part of a six ship slave raiding fleet under the command of Lançarote de Freitas. In this expedition Gil Eanes commanded his own ship, though there is no name given for the ship nor way to link it to the expeditions of the 1430's. The slaving convoy landed at what is today known as The Bay of Arguin in modern day Mauritania, taking an unknown amount of time to arrive there but making it with no recorded incident. The Portuguese were recorded to have attacked multiple settlements in and around the bay, with much focus on what they called The Island of Tiger, culminating in a small battle which the Portuguese won. Azurara gives Eanes significant credit for his actions during the mission claiming he was a major encouraging figure in some of the attacks felt risky by other members of the flotilla. Ultimately the mission was seen as a success as the flotilla returned to Lagos with 235 slaves, one fifth they gave to the Prince Henry.

== Later Life ==
Gil Eanes disappears from the historical record after his slaving voyage.

== Namesakes ==
A city square is named in his native city of Lagos, Portugal.

An old lyceum in Mindelo on the island of São Vicente, Cape Verde, was named for him. In the 1930s, it had the best education on the island and the archipelago. Today it is known as Escola Jorge Barbosa, and forms a campus of the University of Cape Verde.

A Portuguese Navy ship built in 1955 was named after him.

== See also ==
- List of explorations
- List of explorers
- Portuguese Empire
- Timeline of European exploration

== Sources ==
- Morison, Samuel Eliot (1974), The European Discovery of America: The Southern Voyages, 1492–1616, New York: Oxford University Press
- Kerr, Robert (1844), A general history and collection of voyages and travels, arranged..., vol. 2, Edinburgh, Scotland: William Blackwood
- Villiers, Alan (1956), Pioneers of the Seven Seas, London, England: Routledge & Paul
- Ray Howgego. "Gil Eannes". Discoverers Web. Archived from the original on 2007-02-08.
- Seed, Patricia (2007), "Navigating the Mid-Atlantic, or What Gil Eanes Achieved", in Cañizares-Esguerra, Jorge; Seeman, Erik R. (eds.), The Atlantic in Global History, 1500–2000, London, England: Pearson
- Albuquerque Luis (1987), Gil Eanes, Lisbon: Instituto De Investigacao Cientifica Tropical
- Azurara Gomes Eanes, Beazley Charles, Prestage Edgar (1896) The Chromicle Of The Discovery And Conquest Of Guinea. Written By Gomes Eannes De Azurara; Now First Done Into English By Charles Raymond Beasley, M.A., F.R.G.S., Cambridge: Cambridge University Press
- Law, John (1987). "On the Social Explanation of Technical Change: The Case of the Portuguese Maritime Expansion". Technology and Culture. 28 (2): 227–252 – via JSTOR.
