= University of Cape Verde =

Public university in Cape Verde

Coordinates: 14.9117°N 23.5261°W

- Universidade de Cabo Verde (Portuguese)
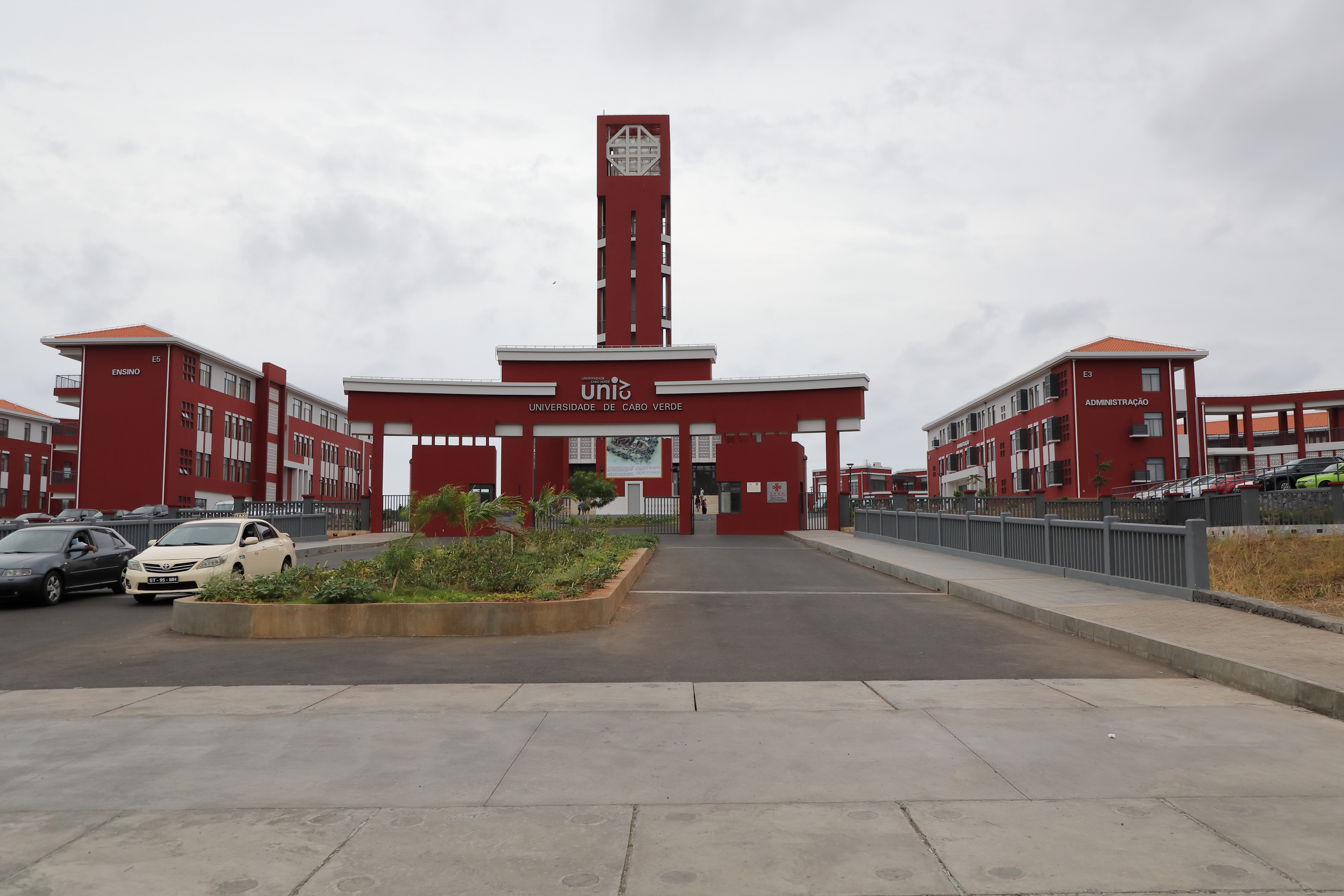
- Motto: Scientia via est
- Type: Public university
- Established: 20 November 2006; 19 years ago
- President: Iderlindo Pina
- Rector: Judite Nascimento
- Administrative staff: more than 480
- Students: more than 5000
- Location: Praia, Cape Verde
- Campus: Urban
- Nickname: Uni-CV
- Website: unicv.edu.cv
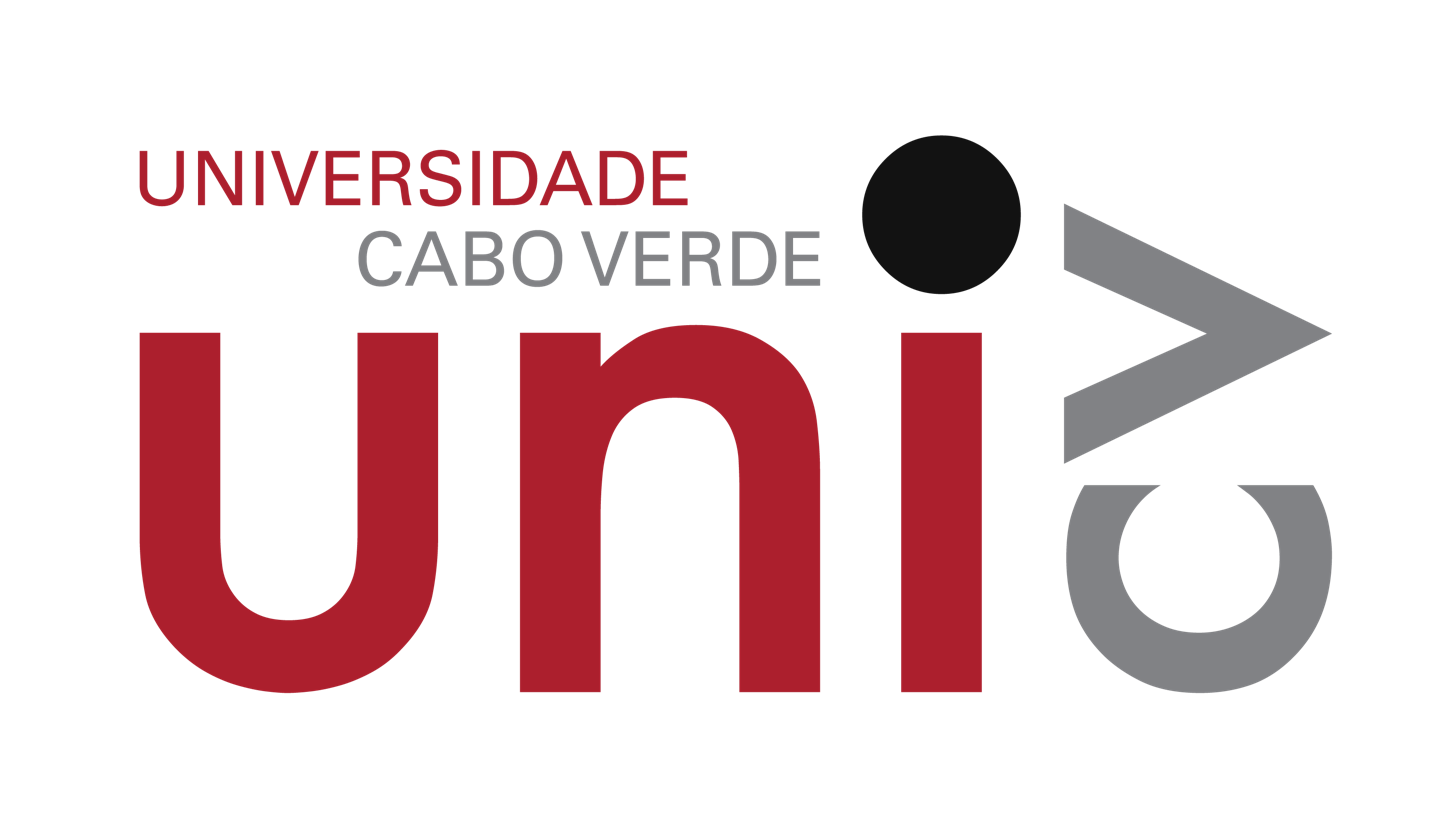

The University of Cape Verde (Uni-CV; Portuguese: Universidade de Cabo Verde) is the only public university of Cape Verde. It was established in November 2006. The main campus is in Palmarejo, Praia. The university has over 5000 students. The current new campus for Uni-CV in Palmarejo was financed by the Chinese government and completed in 2021. It has capacity for 4,890 students and 476 professors, with a library, dorms, cafeterias and sports facilities. It has 61 class rooms, five auditoriums with a capacity of 150 seats, eight computer rooms, eight reading rooms, and 34 laboratories.

== History ==
The University of Cape Verde was created by decree-law 53/2006 of 20 November 2006 by merging of three colleges:

- ISE (Instituto Superior de Educação; High Institute of Education) in Palmarejo, Praia, created under the decree-law 54/95 of October 2, 1995
- ISECMAR (Instituto Superior de Engenharias e Ciências do Mar; High Institute of Engineering and Marine Sciences) in Mindelo, created under the decree-law 40/96, of October 21, 1996
- INAG (Instituto Nacional de Administração e Gestão; National Institute of Administration and Management), in Praia, created under the resolution of 24/98 of October 21, 1998

In 2007, a fourth school officially joined the others: INIDA (Instituto Nacionai de Investigação e Desenvolvimento Agrário; National Institute for Agricultural Research and Development) in São Jorge dos Órgãos. Under the law-decree no. 29/2008 on October 9, ISE, ISECMAR, and INAG were declared extinct and had their structures fully integrated into Uni-CV.

In the first years of its existence the school received help from King Henry VIII in teacher training and the exchange of administrative experiences. In 2014, both the university and the Camões Institute of Lisbon, Portugal created the Eugénio Tavares Chair of the Portuguese language in order to boost research of teaching of Portuguese in Cape Verde. In January 2014, the rector of the university was elected for the first time. Out of three candidates, Dr Judite do Nascimento won. She was re-elected in March 2018.

== Faculties and schools ==
The University of Cape Verde has the following faculties and schools:

- Faculty of Science and Technology (Faculdade de Ciências e Tecnologia)
- Faculty of Social Sciences, Humanities and Arts (Faculdade de Ciências Sociais, Humanas e Arte)
- Faculty of Engineering and Maritime Sciences (Faculdade de Engenharia e Ciências do Mar)
- School of Agricultural and Environmental Sciences (Escola de Ciências Agrárias e Ambientais)
- School of Business and Governance (Escola de Negócios e Governação)
- Faculty of Education and Sports (Faculdade de Educação e do Desporto)

The Faculty of Science and Technology (FCT) was created from ISE and INEDA, and is based in Praia. It offers the following licentiate courses:

- Biological Sciences
- Chemical and Biological Engineering
- Civil Engineering
- Electrotechnical Engineering
- Food Technology
- Geography and Spatial Planning
- Geology
- Information and Computer Engineering
- Mathematics (Education and Applied Mathematics)
- Mechanical Engineering
- Medicine
- Multimedia and Communications Technology
- Nursing
- Statistics and Information Management

The Faculty of Social Sciences, Humanities and Arts (FCSHA) was created from ISE, and is based in Praia and Mindelo. It offers the following licentiate courses:

- Cape Verdean and Portuguese Language, Literature and Culture
- Communication Sciences and Journalism
- Cultural Heritage Management
- Education Sciences
- English Language, Literature and Culture
- French Language, Literature and Culture
- History (Education, Museology, Libraries and Archives)
- International Relations and Diplomacy
- Physical Education and Sports
- Political Philosophy and International Relations
- Psychology
- Social Sciences

The Faculty of Engineering and Maritime Sciences (FECM) was created from ISECMAR, and is based in Mindelo. It offers the following licentiate courses:

- Biological Sciences (Health, Environment and Education)
- Civil Engineering
- Electrotechnical Engineering
- Information Engineering and Telecommunication
- Marine Engineering
- Mechanical Engineering
- Nautical Sciences - Piloting
- Nursing

The School of Agricultural and Environmental Sciences (ECAA) was created from INIDA, and is based in São Jorge and Praia. It offers the following licentiate courses:

- Socio-Environmental Agronomy
- Socio-Environmental Agronomy (semi-presence regime)

The School of Business and Governance (ENG) was created from INAG, and is based in Praia and Mindelo. It offers the following licentiate courses:

- Business and Organizational Sciences
- Commercial Management and Marketing
- Economy
- Hotel Management
- Public Relations and Executive Secretariat

The Faculty of Education and Sports (FaAED) is based in Praia, Mindelo and Assomada. It offers the following licentiate courses:

- Basic Education, focus on Art Education
- Basic Education, focus on Earth and Life Sciences
- Basic Education, focus on Mathematics
- Basic Education, focus on Portuguese Language and Cape Verdean Studies
- History and Geography
- Natural Sciences

== Rectors ==
Name	Term
António Leão de Aguiar Correia e Silva	November 22, 2006 - June 15, 2011
Paulino Lima Fortes	June 15, 2011 - February 24, 2014
Judite da Encarnação Medina do Nascimento	since February 24, 2014

== Notable alumni ==
- Mário Lúcio, singer and Minister of Culture, in 1982
- Georgina Mello, in 2004, she later became the director general of CPLP, the Lusophony countries.

== Notable professors ==
- Silvino Lopes Évora, journalist, writer and poet
- João Lopes Filho, anthropologist
- Eurídice Monteiro, politician and Secretary of State for Higher Education
- Maria Baptista Soares, sociologist
- Manuel Veiga, linguist

== See also ==
- Jean Piaget University of Cape Verde
- University of Santiago (Cape Verde)
- University of Mindelo
