= University of Mindelo =

Private university in Mindelo, Cape Verde

- Universidade do Mindelo (Portuguese)
- Former name: Instituto de Estudos Superiores Isidoro da Graça
- Type: Private university
- Established: June 9, 2003
- Location: Mindelo, Cape Verde
- Campus: Urban
- Website: um.edu.cv

The University of Mindelo (Portuguese: Universidade do Mindelo) is a private university in the city of Mindelo, island of São Vicente, Cape Verde. It was established in 2002, and officially started operations on June 9, 2003 as the Instituto de Estudos Superiores Isidoro da Graça. It was converted into the University of Mindelo in 2010.
