= Badejo =

Badejo is a surname. Notable people with the surname include:

- Babafemi Badejo (born 1955), Nigerian diplomat and academic
- Bolaji Badejo (1953–1992), Nigerian visual artist and actor
- Emmanuel Adetoyese Badejo (born 1961), Nigerian Roman Catholic prelate

== See also ==
- Pedra Badejo, a city in Cape Verde
- Lagoas de Pedra Badejo, wetlands near the Cape Verdean city
- Badejo Field, an offshore oil field of Brazil
