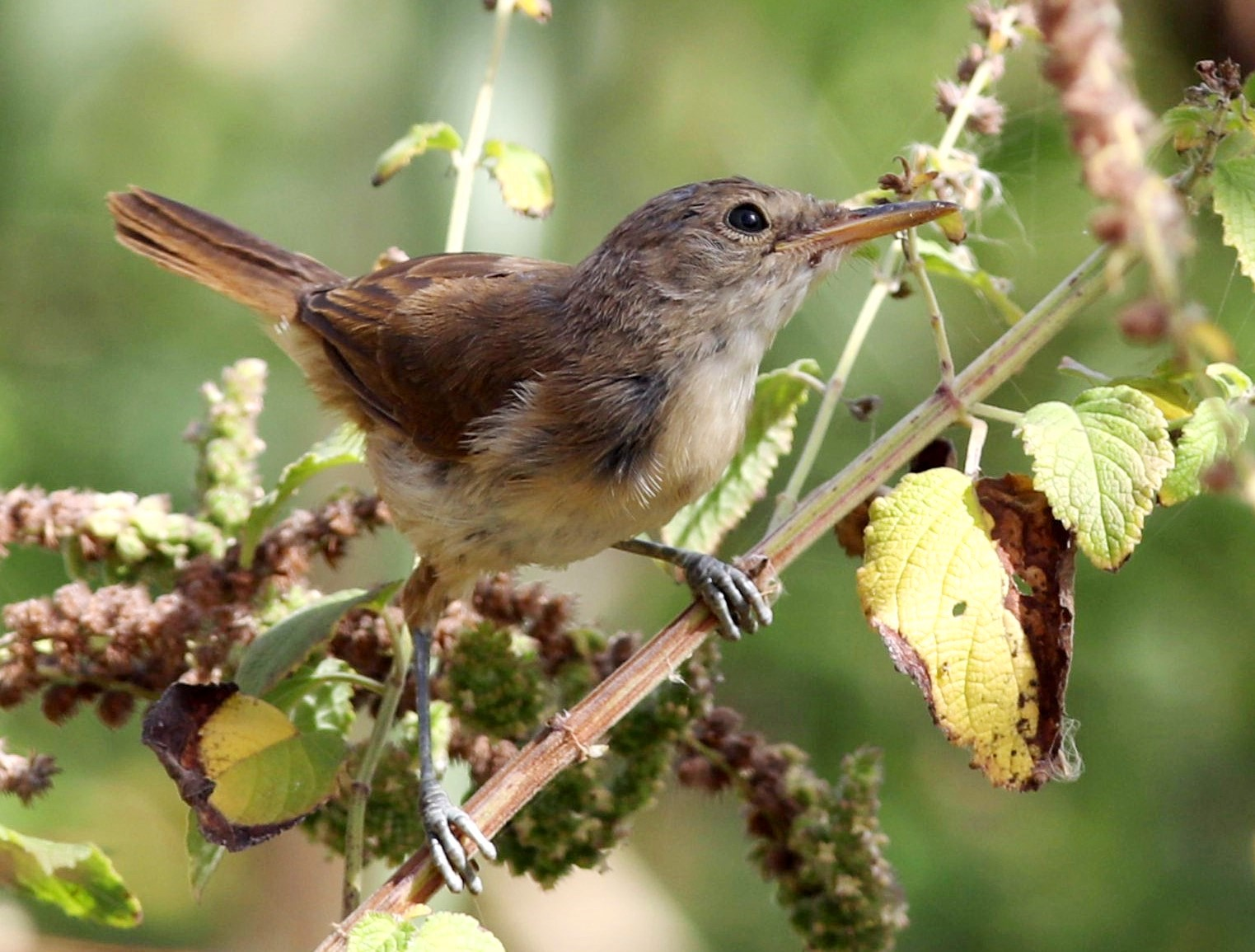
- A. brevipennis at Ribeira Seca, Santiago

Conservation status
- Vulnerable (IUCN 3.1)

Scientific classification
- Kingdom: Animalia
- Phylum: Chordata
- Class: Aves
- Order: Passeriformes
- Family: Acrocephalidae
- Genus: Acrocephalus
- Species: A. brevipennis

Binomial name
- Acrocephalus brevipennis (Keulemans, 1866)
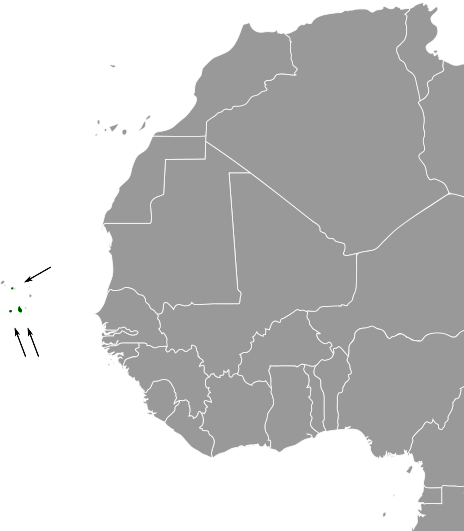
- Geographic range of the Cape Verde(an) warbler (A. brevipennis) – the very limited area indicated by arrows to the far west

= Cape Verde warbler =

Species of bird

The Cape Verde warbler (Acrocephalus brevipennis) is an Old World warbler in the genus Acrocephalus. It is also known as the Cape Verde cane warbler or Cape Verde swamp warbler, and in Creole as tchota-de-cana or chincherote (also tchintchirote). It breeds on Santiago, Fogo, and São Nicolau in the Cape Verde Islands. It previously bred on Brava. This species is found in well-vegetated valleys, avoiding drier areas. It nests in reedbeds, two to three eggs being laid in a suspended nest.

== Description ==
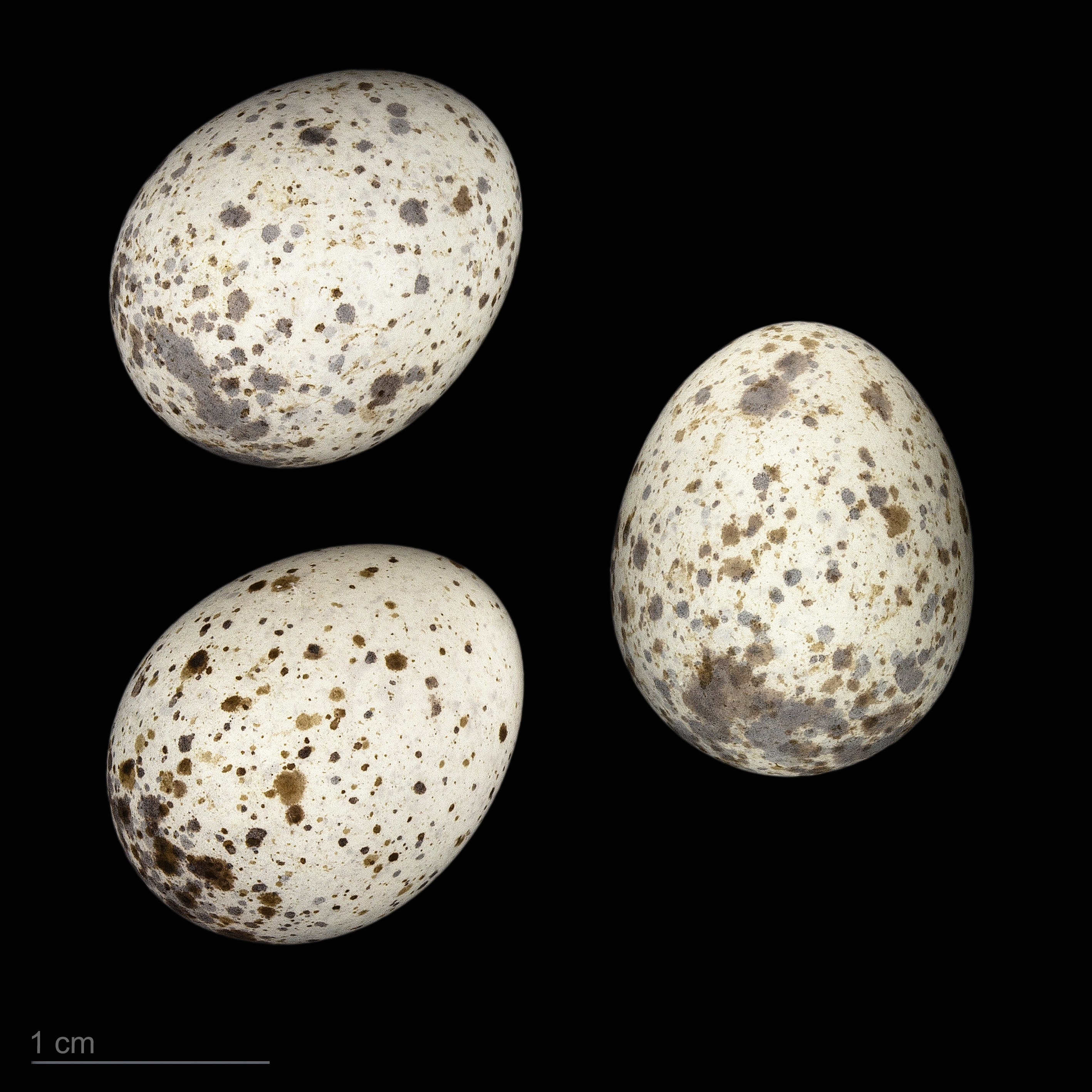
Clutch of A. brevipennis – MHNT

This is a medium-sized warbler, larger than the Eurasian reed warbler. It resembles that bird in appearance, grey-brown above, greyish-white below, with no obvious markings. The geographical isolation of the bird on the Cape Verde Islands prevents confusion with other similar species. The song is a distinctive liquid bubbling, like that of a bulbul.

== Distribution and habitat ==
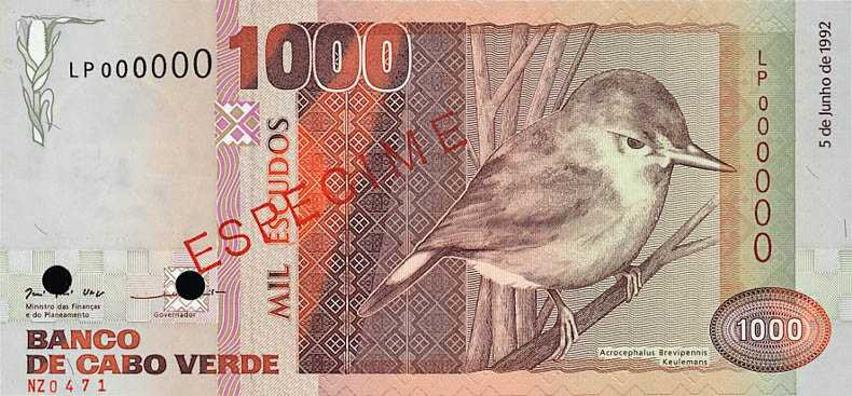
The Cape Verde warbler (Acrocephalus brevipennis) was featured in a 1000 CVE note circulated from 1992 to 2005.

At one time it was thought that the Cape Verde warbler was restricted to the island of Santiago. After a specimen was found in a Lisbon museum, a survey was made on São Nicolau island in 1998 and some individuals were found there. In 2004 a further population was discovered on Fogo island and further survey found it was widespread across the north of the island up to altitudes of about 1,300 m. On Santiago it can be found across the whole island, including in Barragem de Poilão, S. Jorge, Serra Malagueta, Rui Vaz and Tarrafal. Although previously thought to be mainly restricted to woodland and scrub, it is now reported from a wider range of habitats including well-vegetated valleys, reedbeds, cultivated land and around water sources such as dams.

== Status ==
The population trend of the Cape Verde warbler is thought to be declining, probably because of habitat destruction and the droughts that have beset the islands. With its restricted range and relatively small population, this bird has been assessed by the International Union for Conservation of Nature as a vulnerable species.
