= Ribeira Seca (Santiago) =

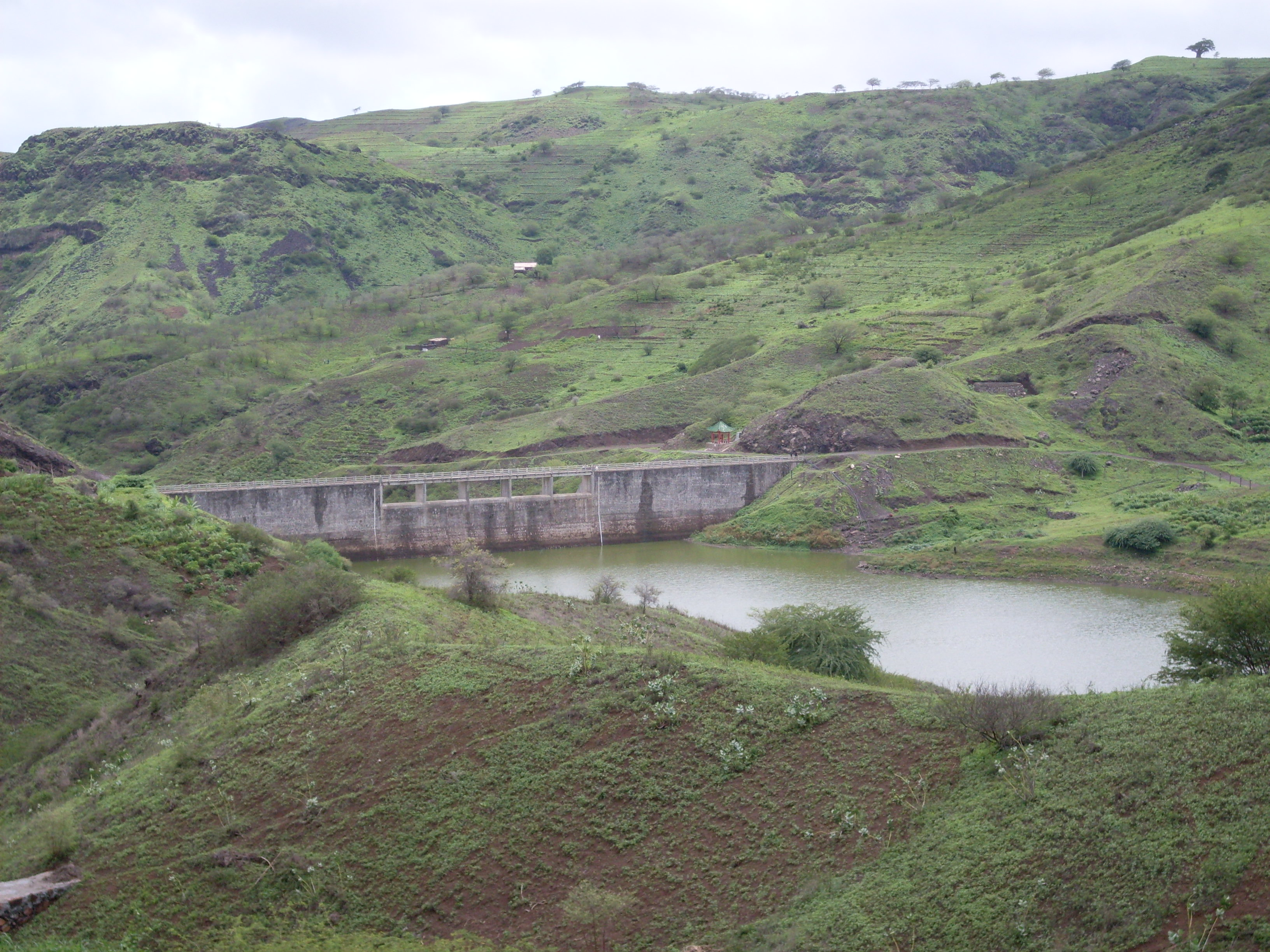
- The stream at the Poilão Reservoir

Location
- Country: Cape Verde

Physical characteristics
- Source
  - location: near Pico da Antónia; Santiago Island, Cape Verde
  - elevation: 1,000 m (3,300 ft)
- Mouth
  - location: Atlantic Ocean near Achada Fazenda
  - coordinates: 15°07′44″N 23°31′12″W
- Length: 18 km (11 mi)
- Basin size: 71.5 km^{2} (27.6 sq mi)

Ribeira Seca is the largest stream of the island of Santiago in Cape Verde. It is 18 km (11 mi) long and its basin area is 71.5 km^{2} (27.6 sq mi). Located in the eastern part of the island, it flows through the municipalities of São Lourenço dos Órgãos and Santa Cruz.

Its source is near the highest point of the island, Pico de Antónia, from where it flows to the east to João Teves. It turns to the northeast and flows into the Atlantic Ocean at Achada Fazenda, 2 km southeast of Pedra Badejo. It is called Ribeira de Pico da Antónia in its uppermost part, and Ribeira de Lage near João Teves.

Its most important tributaries are Ribeira de São Cristovão (coming from near Mendes Faleiro Cabral) and Ribeira da Montanha (coming from near Montanha). The estuary of the Ribeira Seca, Lagoas de Pedra Badejo, is an important wetland area. In 2006 the dam Barragem de Poilão was built, creating a reservoir for irrigation.

== See also ==
- List of streams in Cape Verde
