= Achada Ponta =

- Settlement
- Coordinates: 15.1045°N 23.506°W
- Country: Cape Verde
- Island: Santiago
- Municipality: Santa Cruz
- Civil parish: Santiago Maior

Population (2010)
  - Total: 403
- ID: 73103

Achada Ponta is a settlement in the eastern part of the island of Santiago, Cape Verde. It is part of the municipality Santa Cruz. It is located near the east coast, 2 km southeast of Achada Fazenda and 5 kilometers southeast of Pedra Badejo. In 2010 its population was 403.
