= Longueira, Cape Verde =

Longueira
- Settlement
- Coordinates: 15.050°N 23.617°W
- Country: Cape Verde
- Island: Santiago
- Municipality: São Lourenço dos Órgãos
- Civil parish: São Lourenço dos Órgãos

Population (2010)
  - Total: 326
- ID: 78108

Longueira is a village in the southcentral part of the island of Santiago, Cape Verde. In 2010 its population was 326. Longueira is located 4 km southwest of João Teves and 1.5 km west of São Jorge. Monte Tchota, the highest point of the mountains of Rui Vaz, lies to the south.
