= Santa Cruz (Santiago) =

- Settlement
- Coordinates: 15.134°N 23.560°W
- Country: Cape Verde
- Island: Santiago
- Municipality: Santa Cruz
- Civil parish: Santiago Maior

Population (2010)
  - Total: 2,019
- ID: 73120

Santa Cruz is a settlement in the eastern part of the island of Santiago, Cape Verde. It is part of the municipality of Santa Cruz. It is located 2 km south of Cancelo and 3 km west of Pedra Badejo, on the national road to Tarrafal (EN1-ST02). In 2010 its population was 2,019.
