= Levada =

Levada may refer to:

- Levada (Madeira), an irrigation channel or aqueduct on the island of Madeira
- Levada, Cape Verde, a village on the island of Santiago, Cape Verde
- Levada, a neighborhood in Kharkiv, Ukraine
- Levada (Kharkiv Metro), a Kharkiv Metro station
- Levada Center, a Russian independent non-government polling and sociological research organisation

== Italy ==
- Levada, a village in Concordia Sagittaria, Italy
- Levada, a village in Godega, Italy
- Levada, a village in Pederobba, Italy
- Levada, a village in Ponte di Piave, Italy
- Levada, a village in Piombino Dese, Italy

== Surname ==
- Yuri Levada - a renowned Russian sociologist and political scientist.
- William Levada (1936-2019) - an American cardinal of the Roman Catholic Church.
