= Montanha =

- Settlement
- Coordinates: 15.084°N 23.584°W
- Country: Cape Verde
- Island: Santiago
- Municipality: São Lourenço dos Órgãos
- Civil parish: São Lourenço dos Órgãos

Population (2010)
  - Total: 462
- ID: 78109

Montanha is a settlement in the central part of the island of Santiago, Cape Verde. It is situated 2 km north of João Teves and 8 km southwest of Pedra Badejo. The area is intensively farmed; mainly maize, beans and sugar-cane.

== Mahogany trees ==
There are two African mahogany trees near the village of Banana (part of the settlement Montanha), standing at the bottom of the Ribeira Montanha valley, 400 m above sea level. The trees were identified as an Important Bird Area (IBA) by BirdLife International because they support a colony of purple herons or Bourne's herons.
