= Mato Raia =

- Settlement
- Coordinates: 15.0733°N 23.5869°W
- Country: Cape Verde
- Island: Santiago
- Municipality: São Lourenço dos Órgãos
- Civil parish: São Lourenço dos Órgãos

Population (2010)
  - Total: 181
- ID: 78193

Mato Raia is a settlement in the central part of the island of Santiago, Cape Verde. It is part of the municipality São Lourenço dos Órgãos. It is located about a kilometer north from the city of João Teves. In 2010 its population was 181.
