= Levada, Cape Verde =

Levada
- Settlement
- Coordinates: 15.070°N 23.563°W
- Country: Cape Verde
- Island: Santiago
- Municipality: São Lourenço dos Órgãos
- Civil parish: São Lourenço dos Órgãos

Population (2010)
  - Total: 234
- ID: 78107

Levada is a village in the interior of the island of Santiago, Cape Verde. It is part of the municipality of São Lourenço dos Órgãos. It is situated 3 km east of João Teves, 5 km north of São Domingos, and 18 km north of the capital Praia. In 2010, its population was 234. The village is on the upper course of the river Ribeira Seca and west of the Poilão Reservoir.
