= Líver Gomes =

Cape Verdean politician

Edson Líver Mendes Gomes
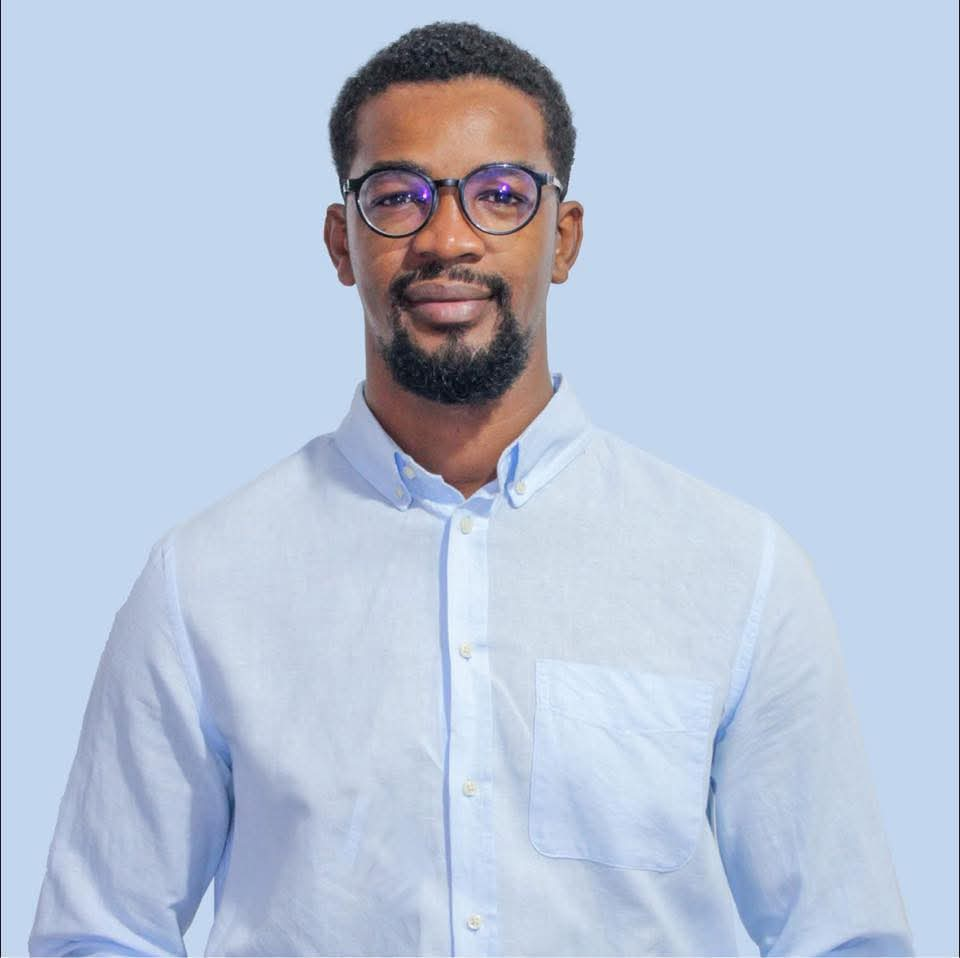
- Líver Gomes in 2026

President of the Youth for Democracy
- Incumbent
- Assumed office 2025

Director of the Employment and Professional Training Center of Santa Cruz
- Incumbent
- Assumed office 2025

Coordinator of the Employment and Professional Training Center of Santa Cruz
- In office 2019–2024

Personal details
- Born: November 30, 1992 (age 33) Pedra Badejo, Santa Cruz, Santiago Island, Cape Verde
- Party: Movement for Democracy (MpD)
- Education: University of Cape Verde
- Occupation: Politician
- Profession: Public manager

Edson Líver Mendes Gomes (born 30 November 1992) is a Cape Verdean politician and member of the Movement for Democracy (MpD). Since 2025, he has served as president of the Youth for Democracy (JpD), the party's youth organization.

== Early life and education ==
Gomes was born in Pedra Badejo, in the municipality of Santa Cruz, on the island of Santiago, on 30 November 1992.

He attended the University of Cape Verde, where he obtained a degree in Educational Sciences, with specialization in pedagogical supervision. During his academic career, he was actively involved in student representation, serving as president of the Students' Association of the University of Cape Verde and contributing to the creation of the League of University Associations of Santiago.

== Professional career ==
Gomes began his professional career in the fields of education and training, focusing on institutional supervision, evaluation, and management of training programs.

In 2019, he was appointed coordinator of the Employment and Professional Training Center of Santa Cruz, where he managed initiatives related to professional qualification and labour market integration.

He later served as director of the same institution, a position he held until 2024.

In 2025, he was reappointed as director of the Employment and Professional Training Center of Santa Cruz.

== Political career ==
A member of the Movement for Democracy (MpD) since 2013, Gomes began his political activity within the Youth for Democracy (JpD).

Within the JpD, he held several leadership roles, including deputy secretary-general and secretary-general.

In the 2024 local elections, he was the MpD candidate for mayor of Santa Cruz. His campaign focused on local economic development and youth employment.

In July 2025, he was the sole candidate for the leadership of the JpD and was elected president of the organization.

== 2026 legislative elections ==
For the 2026 legislative elections, Gomes was included in the MpD candidate list for the Santiago North constituency, occupying the fourth position.

== Recognition ==
In 2025, Gomes was listed among the "100 most influential young people in Africa".
