= Achada Fazenda =

- Settlement
- Coordinates: 15.121°N 23.520°W
- Country: Cape Verde
- Island: Santiago
- Municipality: Santa Cruz
- Civil parish: Santiago Maior

Population (2010)
  - Total: 2,592
- ID: 73102

Achada Fazenda is a settlement in the eastern part of the island of Santiago, Cape Verde. In 2010 its population was 2,592. It is situated near the east coast, 2 km southeast of Pedra Badejo, near the estuary of the Ribeira Seca (Lagoas de Pedra Badejo).
