= Barragem de Poilão =

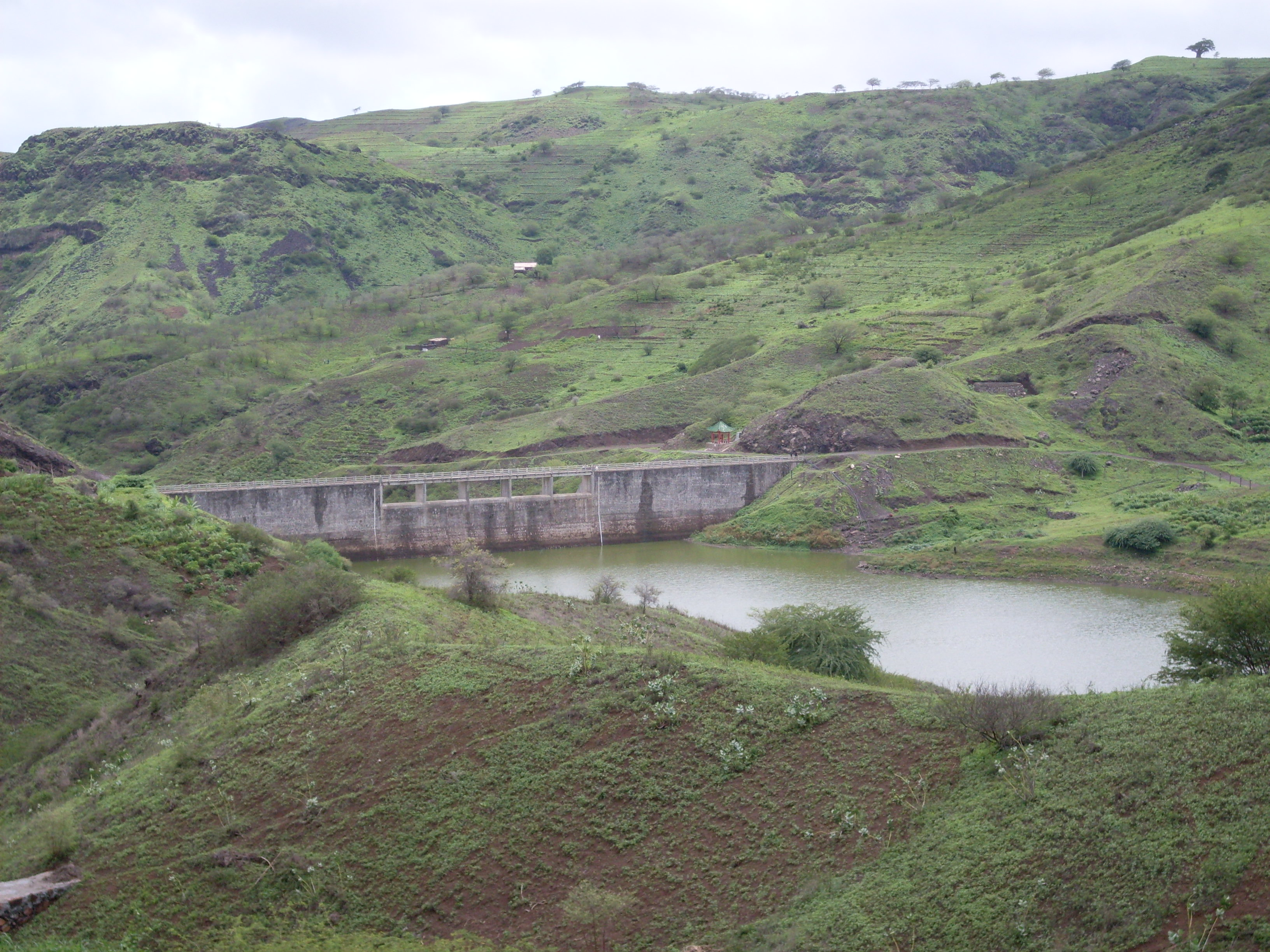
- The reservoir and the dam of Poilão

- Location within Cape Verde
- Location: São Lourenço dos Órgãos, Santiago, Cape Verde
- Coordinates: 15.0757°N 23.5540°W
- Type: Reservoir
- Primary inflows: Ribeira Seca
- Primary outflows: Ribeira Seca
- Catchment area: 28 km^{2} (11 sq mi)
- Basin countries: Cape Verde
- Max. length: 1.23 km (0.76 mi)
- Surface area: 17 ha (42 acres)
- Max. depth: 18 m (59 ft)
- Water volume: 1.2×10^{6} m^{3} (42×10^{6} cu ft)
- Surface elevation: 118 m (387 ft)

Barragem de Poilão is a dam located in the eastern part of the island of Santiago, Cape Verde, in the municipality of São Lourenço dos Órgãos. It impounds the stream Ribeira Seca, the island's largest river. the reservoir, used for irrigation, stretches between the villages Poilão and Levada. North of the reservoir is the national road from João Teves to Achada Fazenda (EN1-ST03).

== Specifications ==
The brick dam was completed in July 2006. Its maximum length is 1,235 m, and its maximum surface area is 17 ha. Its surface level is 118 m above sea level, and its depth at the dam is 18 m. Its volume is 1.2×10^{6} m^{3} (42×10^{6} cu ft). The island has a dry climate with occasional torrential downpours. These cause the transport of large quantities of sediment into the reservoir and a study has found that between 2006 and 2013, the storage capacity of the reservoir has been reduced by almost one half.

== See also ==
- List of buildings and structures in Santiago, Cape Verde
