= Lagoas de Pedra Badejo =

Wetlands in Cape Verde

Coordinates: 15°08′N 23°32′W

Designations

Ramsar Wetland
- Official name: Lagoas de Pedra Badejo
- Designated: 18 July 2005
- Reference no.: 1577

The Lagoas de Pedra Badejo is an area of wetlands on the island of Santiago, Cape Verde. It is a 666-hectare (1,650-acre) site comprising two coastal lagoons at the estuaries of the rivers Ribeira dos Picos and Ribeira Seca, and the entire basin of the latter, including the reservoir Barragem de Poilão. It lies south of the town of Pedra Badejo, on the north-east coast of the island. The lagoons are of great ecological value for birds as they contain fresh or only slightly brackish water. They have been recognised as a wetland of international importance by designation under the Ramsar Convention since 2005.

The area around the lagoons is intensively cultivated with coconuts, sugarcane, bananas, cassava and various vegetables. The lagoons, which hold water all year, lie at the mouth of three seasonal watercourses which, when in flood during the wet season, deposit large amounts of mud and debris in the lagoons, making them attractive to water birds such as waders and herons. The site also supports a population of endangered Cape Verde warblers and has been identified as an Important Bird Area (IBA) by BirdLife International.
