= Pedro Alexandre Rocha =

Cape Verdean politician

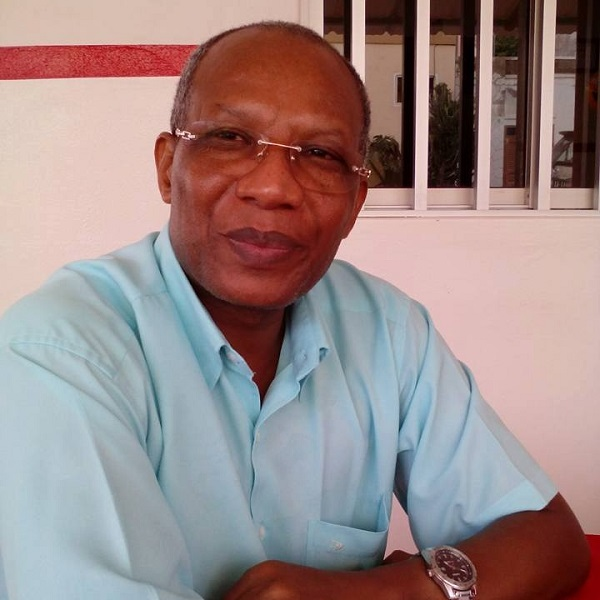
- Pedro Alexandre Rocha

President of the Municipal Council of Santa Cruz
- In office 1992–2000
- President: António Mascarenhas Monteiro; Carlos Veiga
- Succeeded by: Orlando Sanches

Member of the National Assembly
- In office 2001–2006
- President: Pedro Pires; José Maria Neves

Member of the National Assembly
- In office 2011–2016
- President: Pedro Pires; José Maria Neves; Jorge Carlos Fonseca

Personal details
- Born: Pedro Alexandre Tavares Rocha; January 10, 1958 (age 68) Santa Cruz, Santiago Island, Cape Verde
- Party: MpD
- Education: University of Cape Verde
- Occupation: Political figure
- Profession: Teacher

Pedro Alexandre Tavares Rocha, publicly known as Pedro Alexandre Rocha (born 10 January 1958 in Santa Cruz), is a Cape Verdean politician and teacher. A historic member of the Movement for Democracy (MpD), he stood out as the first democratically elected president of the Municipal Council of Santa Cruz and as a member of the National Assembly.

== Biography ==
Pedro Alexandre Rocha graduated in Cape Verdean and Portuguese Studies from the former Higher Institute of Education (ISE), now the University of Cape Verde. He worked as a secondary school teacher for several decades, teaching at Alfredo da Cruz Silva Secondary School in Santa Cruz and at the Secondary School of Santa Catarina. He retired from the Ministry of Education in 2015 with the rank of first-level secondary school teacher.

== Political career ==
=== Local government (1992–2000) ===
Following the political opening of 1991, Pedro Alexandre Rocha was one of the central figures in implementing democratic local government in northern Santiago. In the first municipal elections in Cape Verde, held on 15 December 1991, he was elected president of the Municipal Council of Santa Cruz under the MpD lists, taking office in early 1992.

He served two consecutive terms (1992–1996 and 1996–2000). His municipal administration was marked by the administrative structuring of the municipality and the creation of basic health and education infrastructure. In 2000, after eight years in leadership, the MpD lost the municipal presidency to Orlando Sanches of the PAICV.

=== National Assembly (2001–2006) ===
In the 2001 legislative elections, Pedro Alexandre Rocha was elected as a member of the National Assembly representing the Santiago North constituency.

During this term, he stood out for his work on the Specialized Committee on Education, Science, Youth, and Sports, where he closely monitored the reforms of the national educational system.

=== National Assembly (2011–2016) ===
In the 2011 legislative elections, Pedro Alexandre Rocha was elected as a member of the National Assembly for the Santiago North constituency, representing the MpD.

During his parliamentary term, he participated in external representation bodies of the Cape Verdean parliament, including the Parliamentary Assembly of the Francophonie. He also took part in parliamentary friendship groups with other countries.

In his role as a deputy, he intervened in matters related to the education system, advocating for the strengthening of foreign language teaching, particularly French and English, at different levels of education.

=== 2020 candidacy ===
After several years away from the forefront of municipal politics, Pedro Alexandre Rocha once again positioned himself as a candidate for the Municipal Council of Santa Cruz in the 2020 elections, again under the MpD.

His candidacy focused on issues such as local development, youth support, family welfare, and strengthening traditional economic activities in the municipality, such as agriculture and fishing.

In the elections held on 25 October 2020, the MpD list did not win, finishing behind the PAICV candidate.

== See also ==
- Movement for Democracy (Cape Verde)
- Santa Cruz, Cape Verde
- National Assembly of Cape Verde
