= Cancelo, Cape Verde =

- Settlement
- Coordinates: 15.149°N 23.567°W
- Country: Cape Verde
- Island: Santiago
- Municipality: Santa Cruz
- Civil parish: Santiago Maior

Population (2010)
  - Total: 2,042
- ID: 73106

Cancelo is a settlement in the eastern part of the island of Santiago, Cape Verde. It is part of the municipality Santa Cruz. It is situated near the east coast, 4 km northwest of Pedra Badejo and 5 km southeast of Calheta de São Miguel. In 2010 its population was 2,042.
