= Tomé Varela da Silva =

- Born: 1950 (age 75–76); São Jorge dos Órgãos, Santiago, Cape Verde
- Occupations: writer, poet, philosopher, anthropologist

Tomé Varela da Silva (born 1948 in São Jorge dos Órgãos, Santiago, Cape Verde) is a Cape Verdean writer, poet, philosopher and anthropologist which he studies in an orally tradition and the musical heritage of Cape Verde in which he favored for the usage of Cape Verdean Creole in literature. Himself, he is the author of several poems and stories. His most important works were published in the 1980s and the 1990s

He was interviewed along with Corsino Fortes on December 3, 2008 in Nós Fora dos Eixos. He was interviewed again this time with a newspaper Expresso das Ilhas on the alphabet in Cape Verdean Creole

== Works ==
- Na Bóka Noti (2008) - 3 volumes with history

=== Poems ===
- "Ter uma, Ter várias"

== See also ==
- Eugénio Tavares
- Manuel Veiga
