= Santa Cruz, Cape Verde =

Municipality of Cape Verde

Santa Cruz
- Municipality
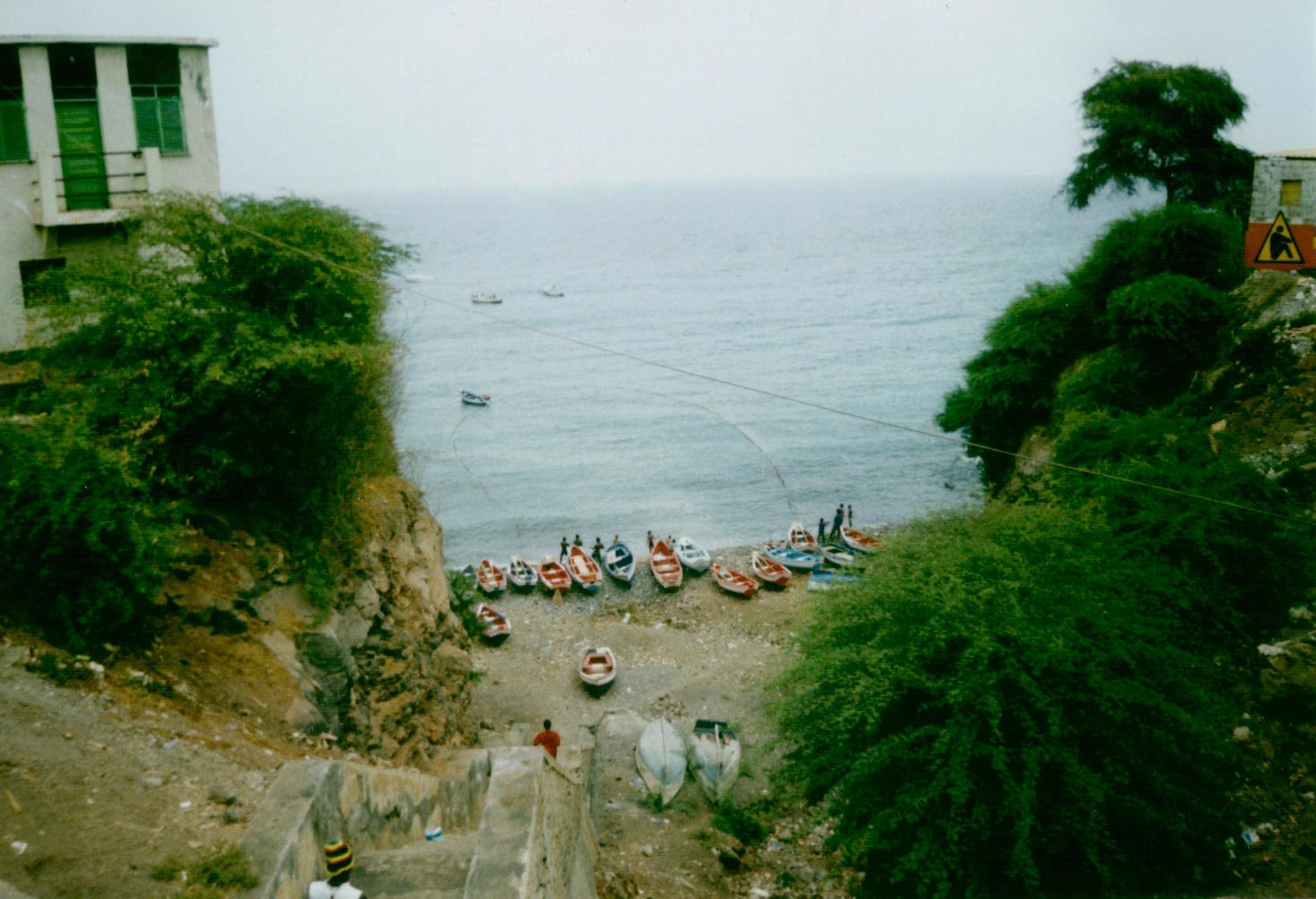
- Port of Pedra Badejo

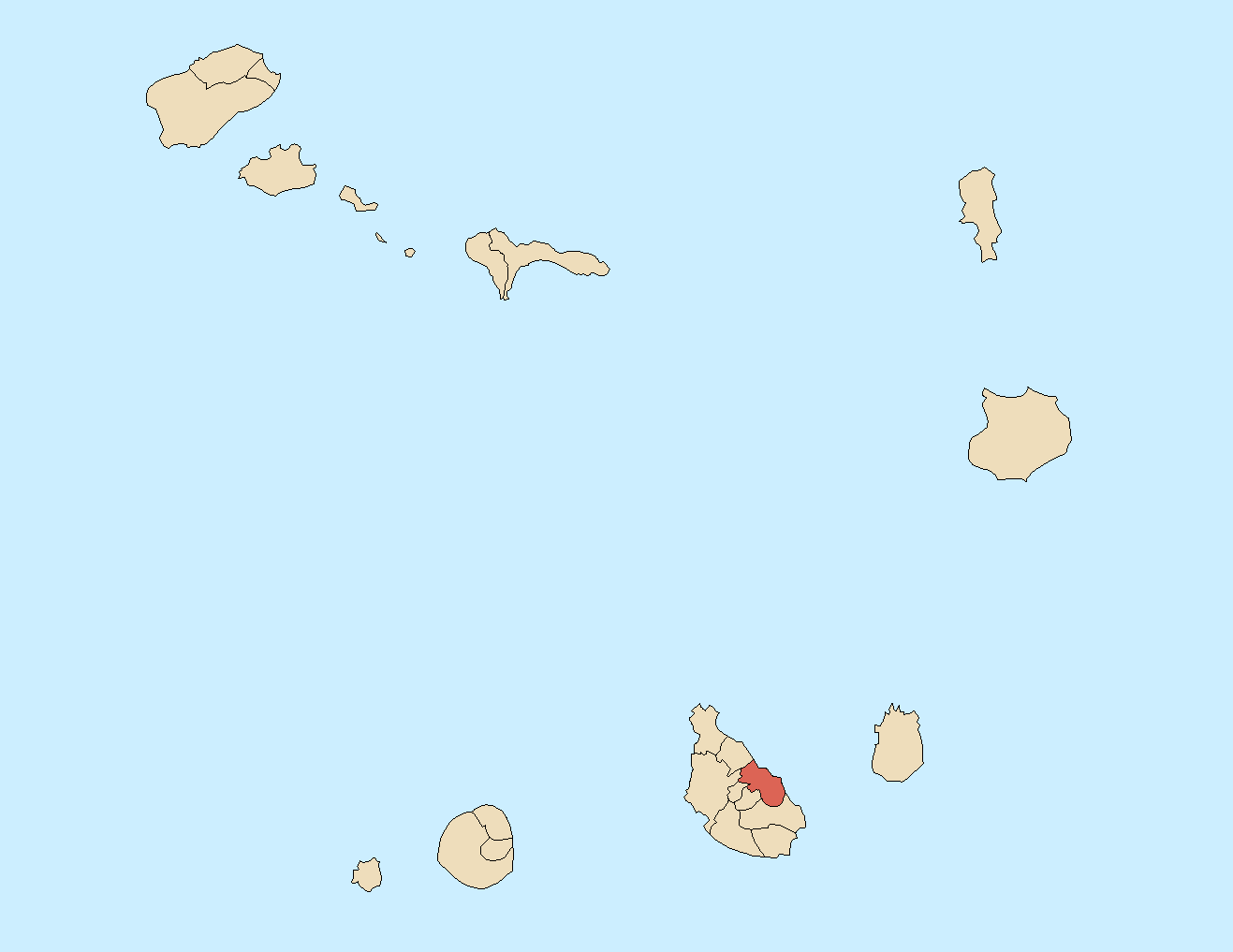
- Coordinates: 15.11°N 23.55°W
- Country: Cape Verde
- Island: Santiago

Area
  - Total: 112.2 km^{2} (43.3 sq mi)

Population (2010)
  - Total: 26,617
  - Density: 237.2/km^{2} (614.4/sq mi)
- ID: 73
- Website: www.cmscz.cv

Santa Cruz is a concelho (municipality) of Cape Verde. It is situated in the eastern part of the island of Santiago. Its seat is the city Pedra Badejo. Its population was 26,617 at the 2010 census, and its area is 112.2 km^{2}.

== Economy ==
Its economy is based in agriculture, in which rural population produces agricultural commodities for export to larger markets in Praia, Assomada and Fogo. Small market centers exist in São Lourenço dos Órgãos and Pedra Badejo, which act primary as commodity exchanges where subsistence farmers exchange goods as available with merchants who transport and sell goods in larger markets. The primary agricultural productions include fodder (usually in the form of maize stalks), bananas, papayas and coconuts. Prior to 1981 the area also produced a substantial percentage of the island's maize, but the arrival of large-scale international food aid, while vastly improving the region’s food security, made producing foodstuffs unprofitable. Maize and legumes are still the region's primary agricultural product, though 97% is consumed by the families that produce it. The mixture of nitrogen fixing and nitrogen consuming crops reduces the need for chemical fertilizers, allowing small farmers to remain solvent despite little cash income.

The dry-season economy is directed primarily by agricultural cooperatives, which assign stonemasonry, carpentry and other construction tasks through contracts awarded by the local governments. The president of the cooperative acts as a de facto village headman in areas where there are no government representative.

The soil in the region is very fertile (being especially rich in iron and potash), though water is scarce in all parts of the municipality.

== Subdivisions ==
The municipality consists of one freguesia (civil parish), Santiago Maior. The freguesia is subdivided into the following settlements:

- Achada Belbel (pop: 767)
- Achada Fazenda (pop: 2,592)
- Achada Igreja (pop: 142)
- Achada Lage (pop: 686)
- Achada Ponta (pop: 403)
- Boaventura (pop: 424)
- Boca Larga (pop: 186)
- Cancelo (pop: 2,042)
- Chã da Silva (pop: 1,152)
- Librão (pop: 297)
- Matinho (pop: 737)
- Monte Negro (pop: 562)
- Pedra Badejo (pop: 9,859, city)
- Porto Madeira (pop: 400)
- Rebelo (pop: 153)
- Renque Purga (pop: 904)
- Ribeira Seca (pop: 720)
- Ribeirão Almaço (pop: 158)
- Ribeirão Boi (pop: 388)
- Rocha Lama (pop: 724)
- Saltos Abaixo (pop: 535)
- Santa Cruz (pop: 2,019)
- São Cristovão (pop: 442)
- Serelho (pop: 293)

== History ==
The municipality was created in 1971, when two parishes of the older Municipality of Praia were separated to become the Municipality of Santa Cruz. In 2005, a southern parish of the municipality was split off to become the Municipality of São Lourenço dos Órgãos.

== Demography ==
Population of Santa Cruz (1980—2010)
Year	Population
1980	22,995
1990	25,892
2000	33,015
2010	26,585

== Politics ==
At the federal level, it belongs to the constituency of Santiago North. Since 2004, the African Party for the Independence of Cape Verde (PAICV) is the ruling party of the municipality. The results of the latest elections, in 2016:

Party	Municipal Council		Municipal Assembly	
Party	Votes%	Seats	Votes%	Seats
PAICV	50.30	7	50.11	9
MpD	47.44	5	47.50	8

== Notable people ==
- Elida Almeida, singer
- Nilson António, footballer
- Djaniny, footballer
- Lito, footballer and manager
- Tino Santos, footballer
- Daniel Varela de Pina, boxer
- Líver Gomes, politician and president of JPD
- Pedro Alexandre Rocha, politician

== Sister city ==
The municipality of Santa Cruz is twinned with:

- (Portugal) Alandroal
- (Portugal) Aveiro
- (Italy) Candiolo
- (Portugal) Lagoa
- (Portugal) Sines
