= Babafemi Badejo =

Nigerian academic

Babafemi Badejo is a Nigerian academic, writer and diplomat.

== Early life and education ==
Badejo was born on 4 March 1955, in Ijebu Ode He attended Saint Saviours Primary School, Italowajoda, Ijebu Ode and Baptist Primary School, Ereko, Ijebu Ode. He finished at Ijebu Ode Grammar School, Ijebu Ode before proceeding to the University of Lagos in 1973 for his first degree in political science. He completed his Ph.D. in political science at the University of California, Los Angeles, (UCLA), US in 1982 and later LL.B., Bachelor of Law, University of Lagos, Nigeria. January 1990. He was called to the Nigerian Bar as a solicitor and advocate of the Supreme Court of Nigeria on 12 December 1990.

== Life and career ==
Badejo married Adejumoke Odusanya on 9 September 1977, and they have three daughters, a son and grandchildren. They jointly set up Yintab Private Academy, providing education from Crèche to Senior Secondary School. Badejo's interest in the game of chess, led to the sponsorship of the Femi Badejo National Chess Tournament in 2002, by the Femi Badejo Foundation in conjunction with the Nigeria Chess Federation (NCF)

On 2 October 1991, the Minister of External Affairs of the Federal Republic of Nigeria approved his participation in the 46th Session of the UN General Assembly as Special Assistant to former President Olusegun Obasanjo on his bid for the position of the UN Secretary General.

He formally left his academic career at the University of Lagos in 1996 for a career in peace operations at the United Nations, from which he retired on 31 March 2017. He served in many conflict areas, including Somalia, Liberia, Guinea-Bissau and Darfur Sudan. During an 11 years stay in Nairobi, Kenya at the UN Political Office for Somalia, he was appointed Deputy Special Representative of the UN Secretary-General, (DSRSG) for Somalia.

Upon his retirement from the UN, he founded and headed Yintab Strategy Consults (YSC) in April 2017. In this capacity, he has played a key role for the African Union (AU), and the Addis Ababa branch of the United Nations Economic Commission for Africa (UNECA). Here, he designed the operationalisation of the African Union Humanitarian Agency. as well as worked on the Four-pillar Interlinkages for West and Central Africa in a consultancy for the UN ECA. He also consulted for the ECOWAS 2050 Vision Programme. He also served as an adviser to the Office of the Prime Minister of the Kingdom of Bahrain from 2018 to 2020 and in those years, served on the Bahraini delegation to the UN General Assembly. He currently advises His Excellency, Jose Ramos-Horta, and the President of Leste-Timorese on relations with Africa.

Contributions in Research and Development

Babafemi A. Badejo returned to the classroom becoming a professor at Chrisland University, Abeokuta, Nigeria, beginning 11 March 2021. He is widely published in a number of academic journals, books, and chapters in books including a Best Seller on Kenya (Raila Odinga: An Enigma in Kenyan Politics, 2006). He has shared his thoughts on a number of touching issues, especially around corruption, leadership deficit, governance and political economy of Africa on different newspapers and social media. Through one of his most recent books titled: Nigerians’ Views on National Turmoil: A Situational Quadruple Nexus Analysis, he advanced the Situational Quadruple Nexus Analysis, as an explanatory framework that is central for an understanding of the absence of peace and security, development, human rights and humanitarianism in Africa.

He is a member of the Nigeria Bar Association. He obtained certifications in mediation/arbitration. He is a member of the Lagos Multi-Door Courthouse Panel of Neutrals; Associate, Chartered Institute of Arbitration U.K.; and Associate member, of the Business Recovery and Insolvency Practitioners Association of Nigeria. Babafemi A. Badejo is also a co-opted Member, Nigeria Bar Association (NBA) National Executive Council 2024-2026, and was subsequently appointed Chairman, NBA Anti-Corruption Committee, 2024-2026, under the leadership of Mazi Afam Osigwe, SAN, the NBA President.

Badejo received 2025 Nelson Mandela Distinguished Africanist Award, by the African Annual Conference at the University of Texas at Austin - a lifetime achievement award. The spirit of this award was reflected in a summation by Toyin Falola at Badejo's 70th birthday lecture in March 2025, when he was described “as a shining example of the quest to make the world a better place, by consistently churning out reflective ideas, thoughts and works on the democratic and developmental experiences of Africa ...” He also received recognition and commendation from the President of Nigeria, President Bola Ahmed Tinubu on the occasion of the same 70th Birthday Celebration. A statement signed by the Special Adviser to the President, Mr. Bayo Onanuga, affirmed Badejo's impactful career at the United Nations, the African Union, and academia. The Nigerian President applauded Badejo's contributions to the peace processes in Somalia, Liberia, Guinea-Bissau, and Sudan and his pivotal role in the Djibouti Initiative for peace in Somalia, which laid the foundation for national governance structures in Somalia after a decade of strife.

On the 2nd of November, 2025, Prof. Babafemi Badejo was decorated with the "Djibouti National Order of 27 June 1977" by the Prime Minister on behalf of the President. This state honor was bestowed for expert mediation and sustained support for Somali peace, specifically acknowledging the enduring impact of the Arta Peace Conference (2000) on Somalia's modern governance.

Badejo is a professor of Political Science and International Relations who has written over 50 academic publications. These include Books, Team Publications, Referred Articles, Monographs and Chapters in books, as well as other major research work in progress. These include books on Kenya, Nigeria and recently, on Somalia titled, "Somalia Just Before Al-Shabaab: Why Peace Was Elusive" referred to by David Stephen, former UN Representative of the Secretary-General for Somalia with the concurrence of Richard Sklar of UCLA, as “an indispensable source book for academics and for the international community”. His book on Kenya described by Ibrahim A. Gambari, former Under-Secretary-General for Political Affairs at the UN as “compulsory reading for those seeking to understand Kenyan (indeed African) politics with all their contradictions, challenges and possibilities.” Badejo gave the maiden Inaugural Lecture titled: “Interests”, at Chrisland University, Abeokuta, Nigeria. In addition, he has over 150 think pieces in major news outlets.
