= São Jorge (Santiago) =

- Settlement
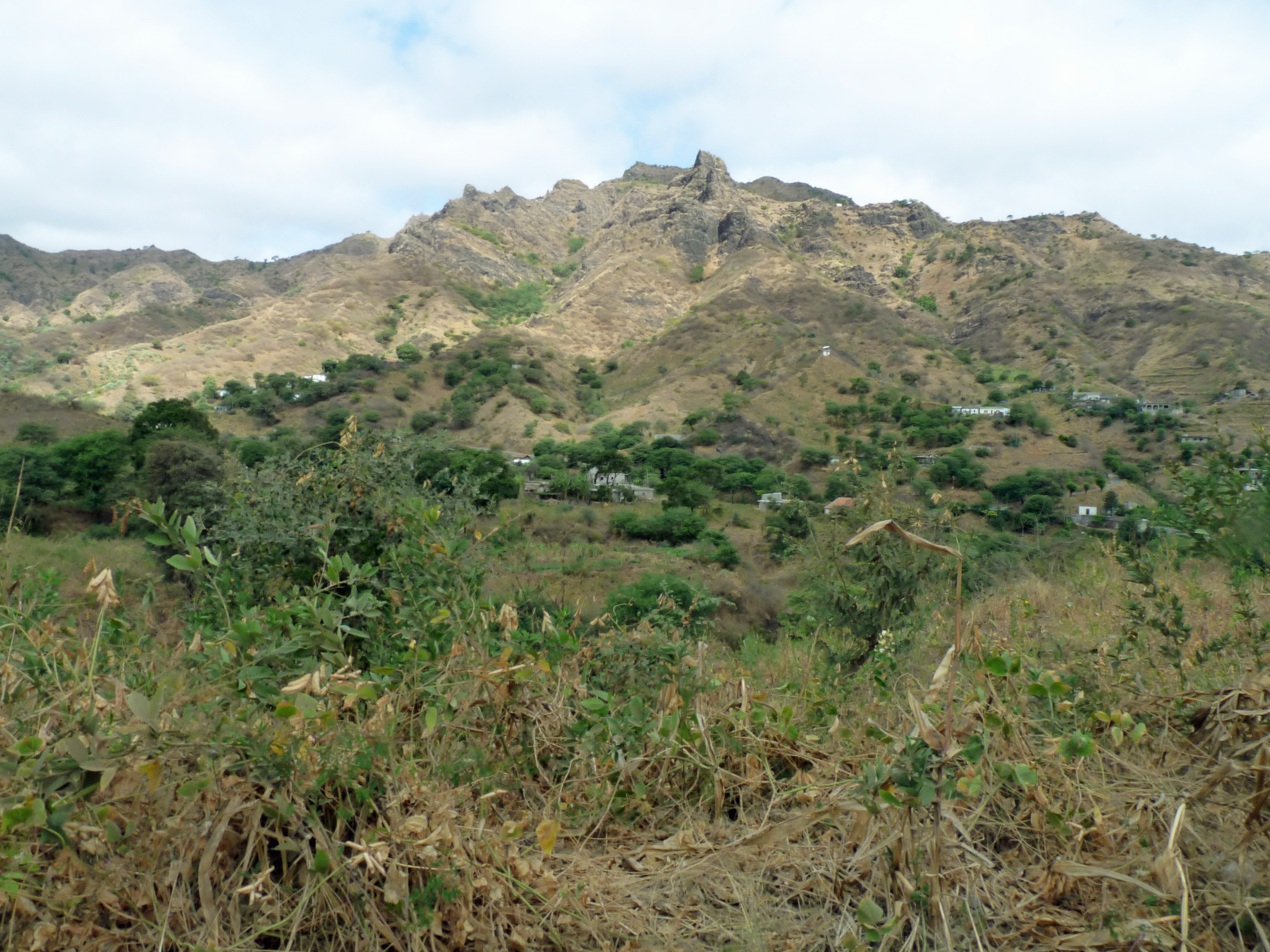
- Outside São Jorge

- Location within Cape Verde
- Coordinates: 15.053°N 23.605°W
- Country: Cape Verde
- Island: Santiago
- Municipality: São Lourenço dos Órgãos
- Civil parish: São Lourenço dos Órgãos
- Elevation: 319 m (1,047 ft)

Population (2010)
  - Total: 6
- ID: 78114

São Jorge (also: São Jorge dos Órgãos) is a settlement in the central part of the island of Santiago, Cape Verde. It is part of the São Lourenço dos Órgãos municipality. In 2010 its population was 6. It is situated 2.5 km southwest of João Teves and 4 km southeast of Picos. Its elevation is 319 meters.

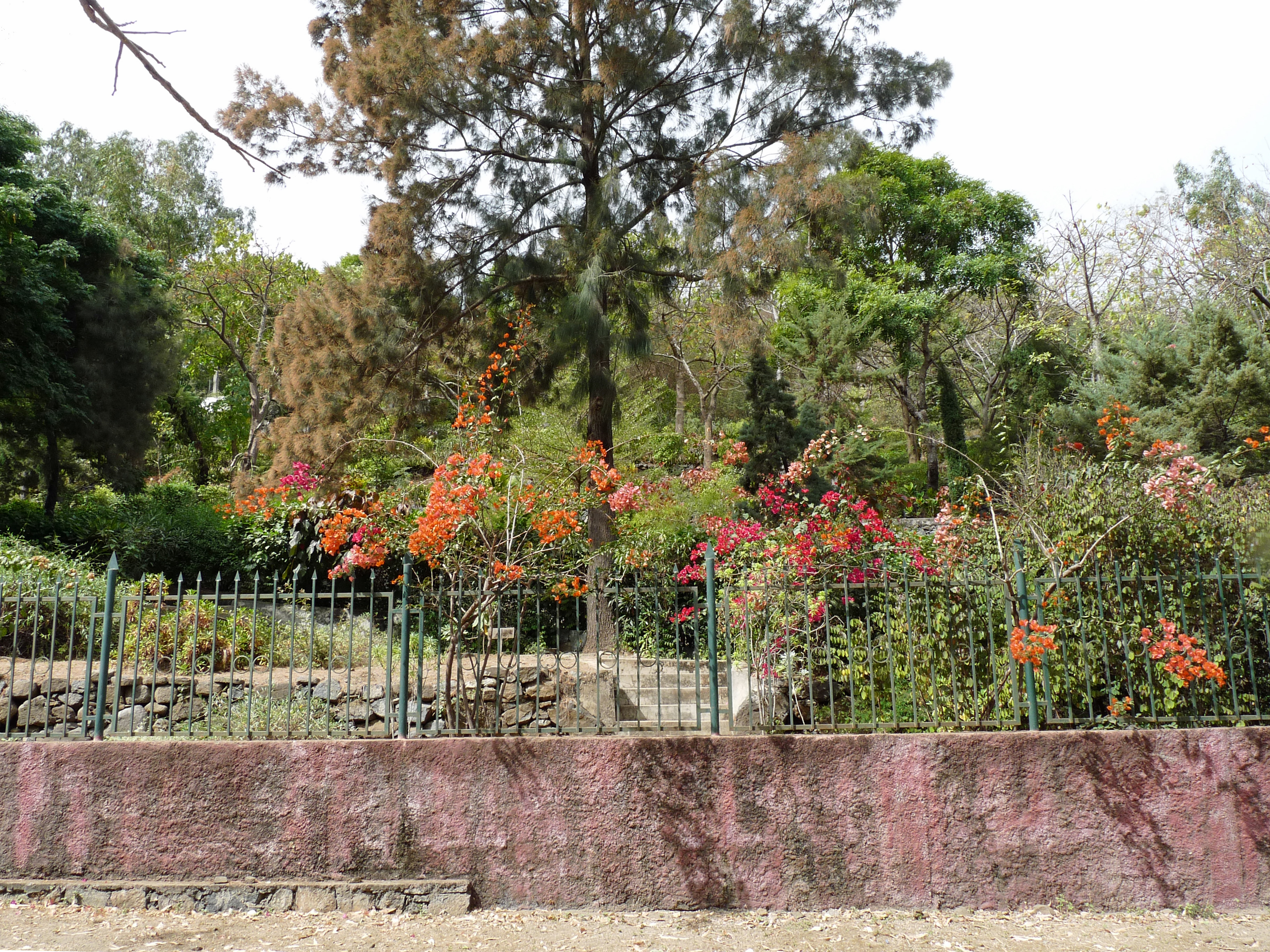
Enclosure of the botanical garden

It is home to the Jardim Botânico (Botanical Garden), the only one in Cape Verde. There is also a research institute of the School of Agricultural and Environmental Sciences, part of the University of Cape Verde.

== Notable person ==
The writer Tomé Varela da Silva was born in the village in 1950.
