= São Lourenço dos Órgãos, Cape Verde =

Municipality of Cape Verde

São Lourenço dos Órgãos
- Municipality
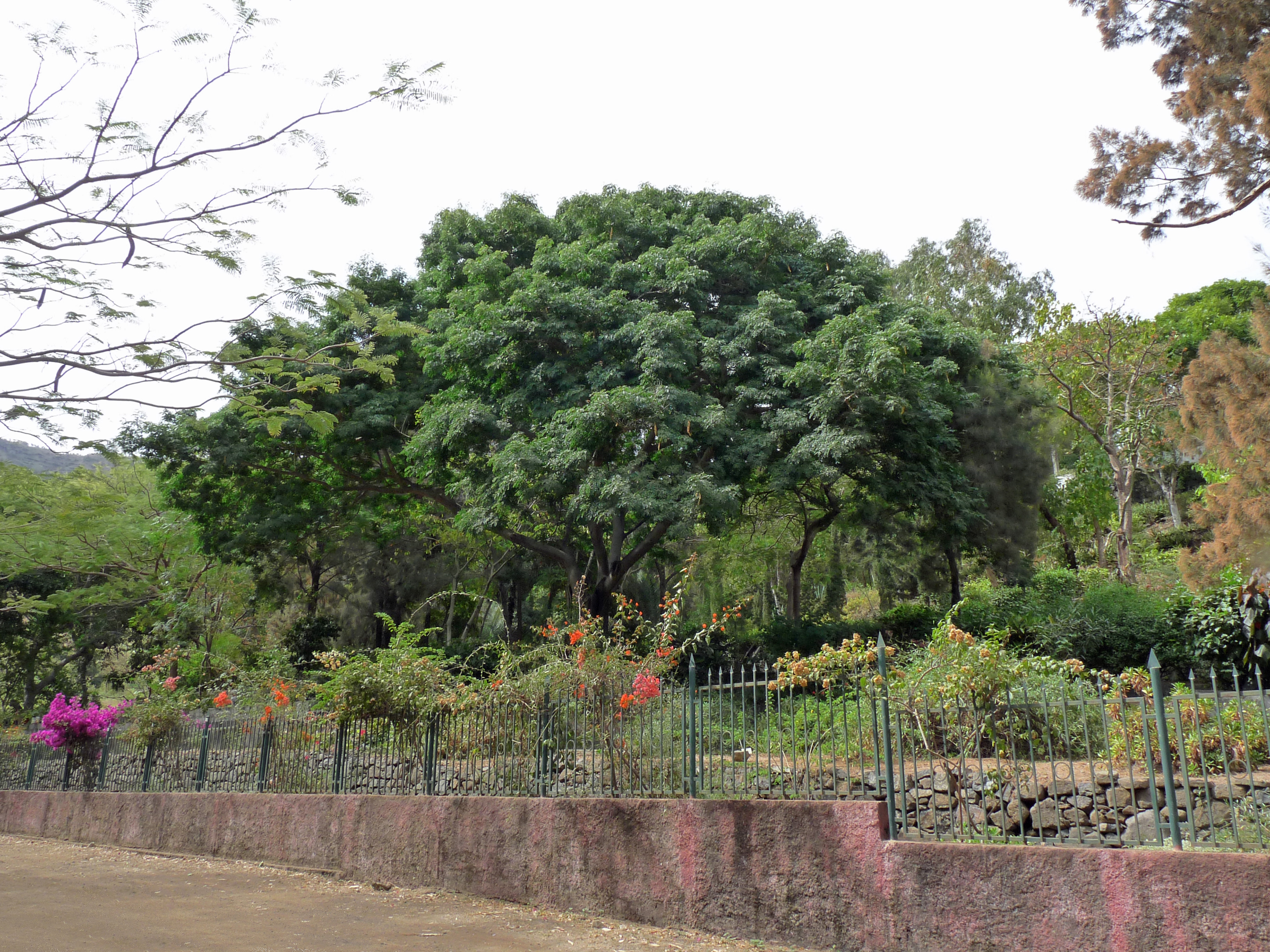
- Grandvaux Barbosa National Botanical Garden

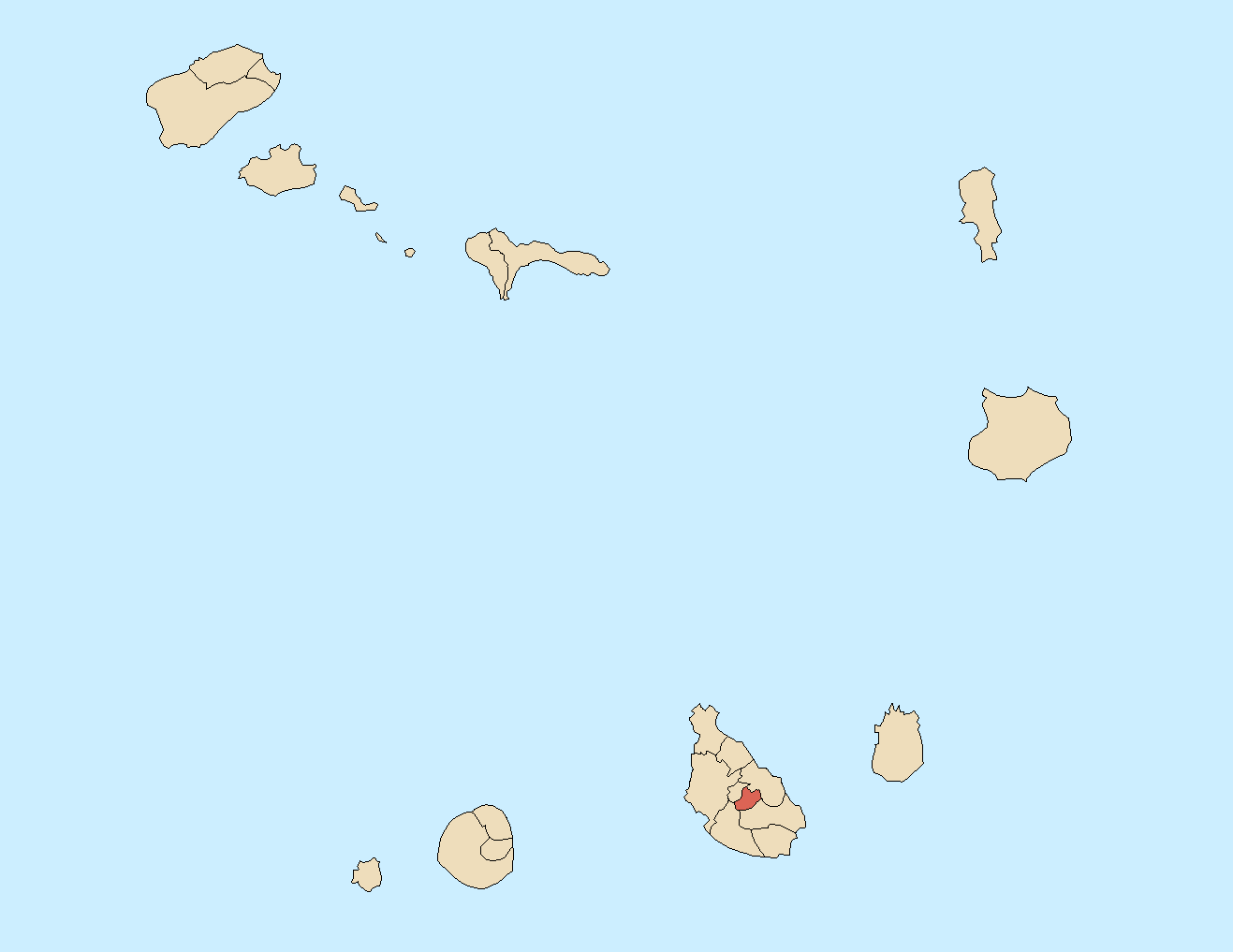
- Coordinates: 15.06°N 23.60°W
- Country: Cape Verde
- Island: Santiago

Area
  - Total: 36.9 km^{2} (14.2 sq mi)

Population (2010)
  - Total: 7,388
  - Density: 200/km^{2} (519/sq mi)
- ID: 78

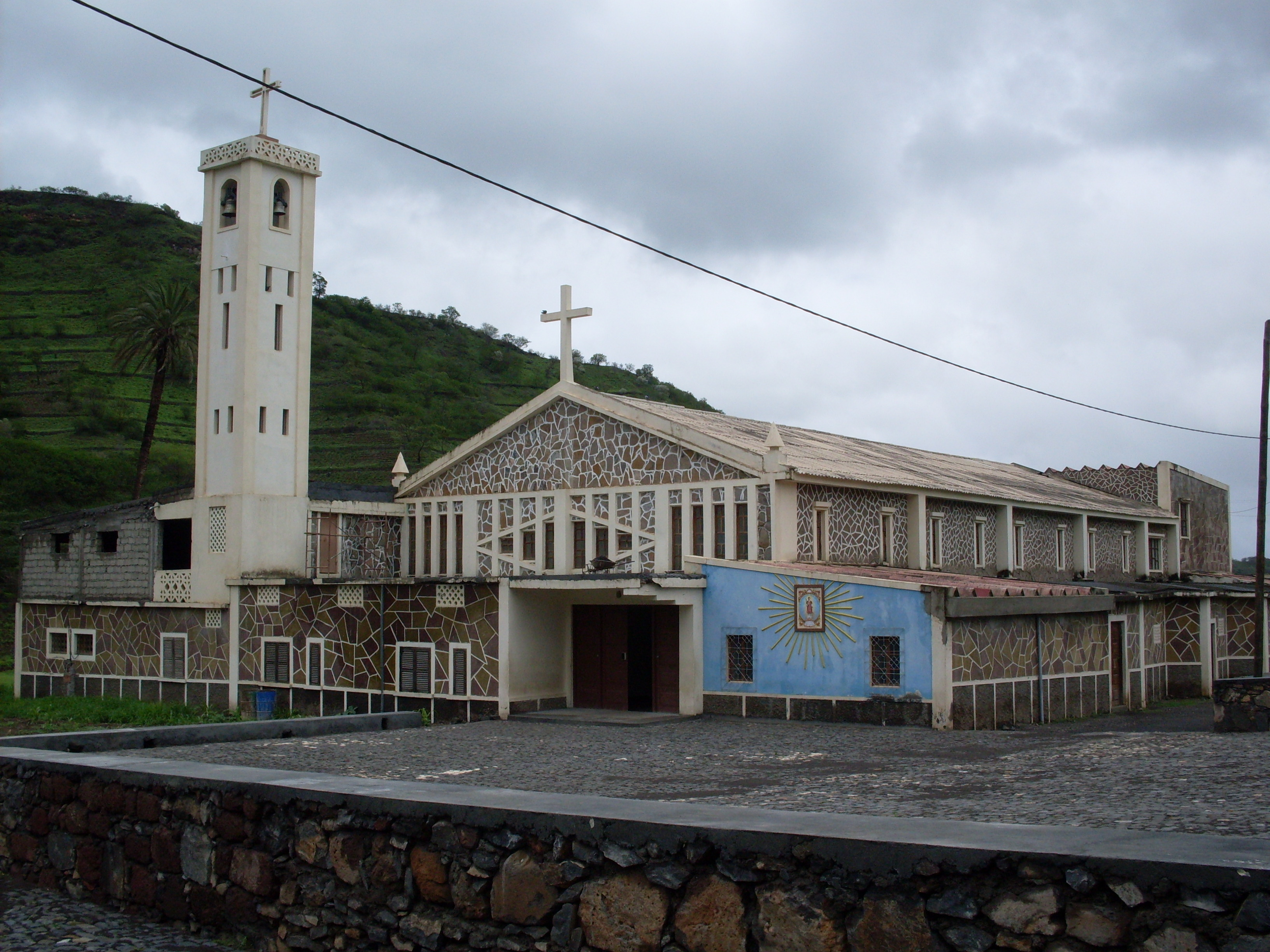
Igreja de São Lourenço dos Órgãos

São Lourenço dos Órgãos is a concelho (municipality) of Cape Verde. It is situated in the mountainous central part of the island of Santiago. Its seat is the city João Teves. Its population was 7,388 at the 2010 census, and its area is 36.9 km^{2}. The municipality is bordered by Santa Cruz to the northeast, São Domingos to the south, Ribeira Grande de Santiago to the southwest and São Salvador do Mundo to the northwest. Pico de Antónia, the island's highest mountain, straddles the borders of São Lourenço dos Órgãos, São Salvador do Mundo and Ribeira Grande de Santiago.

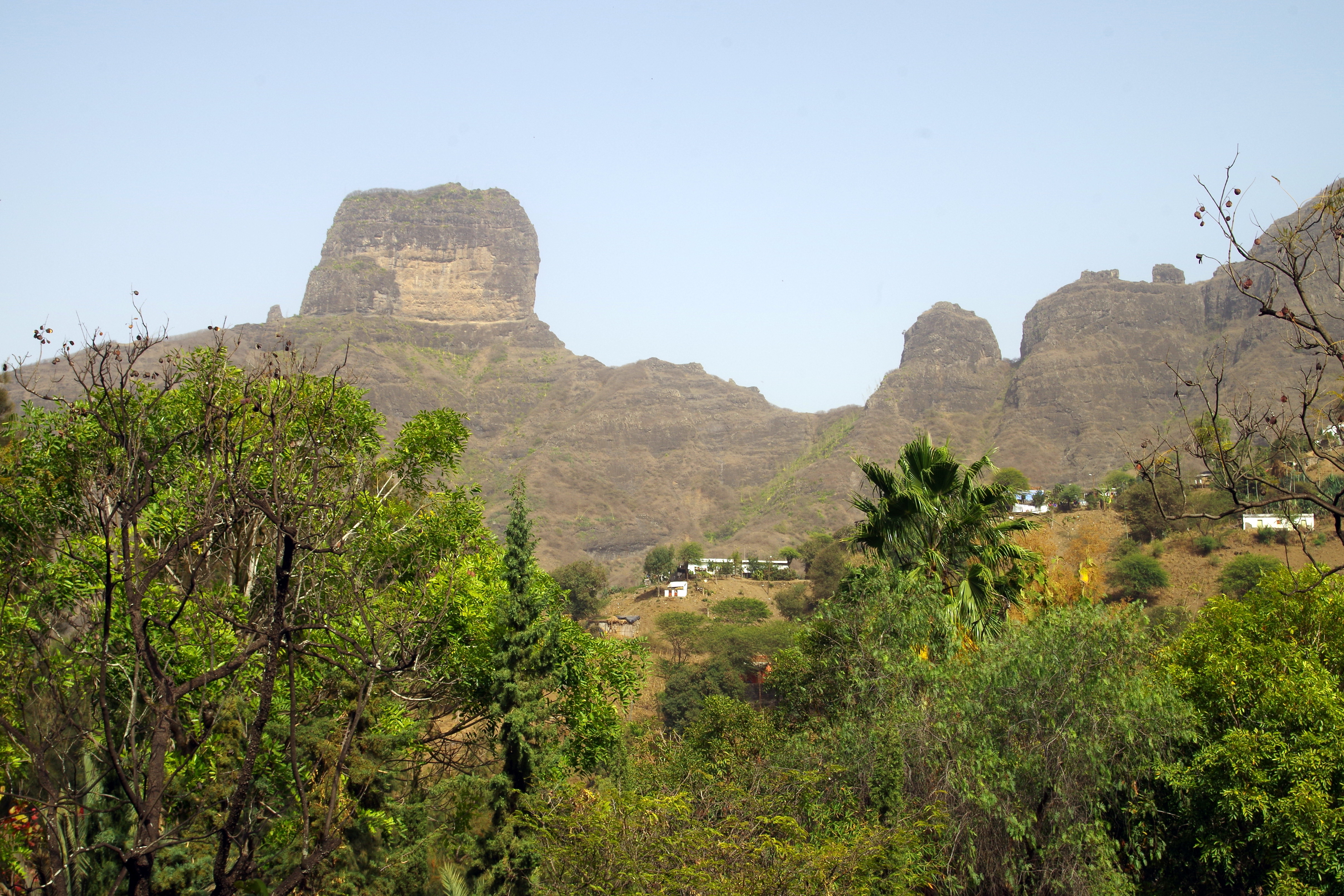
Órgãos, the main peak of the municipality located east of the botanical gardens

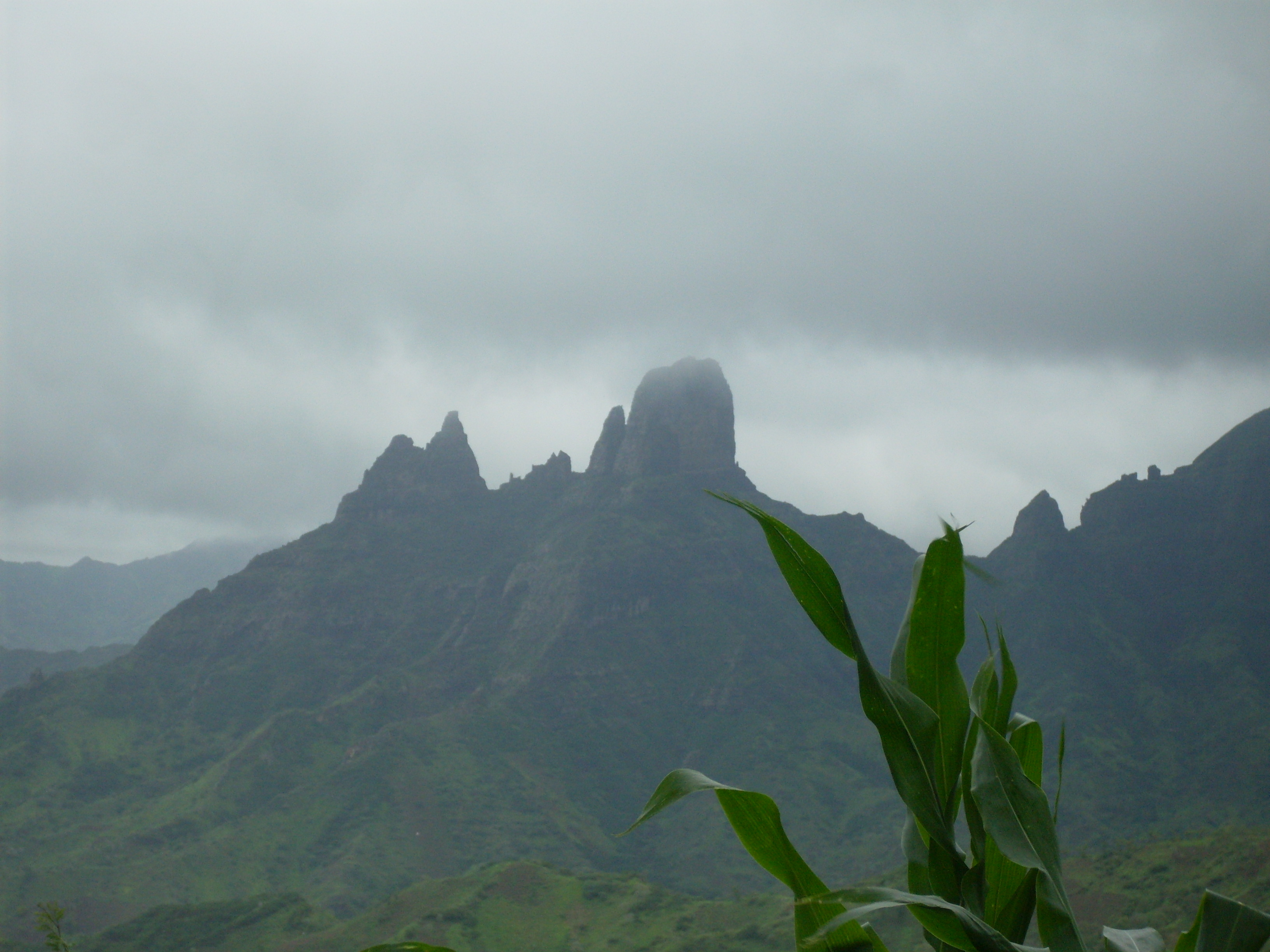
The second main peak of Órgaos

== Subdivisions ==
The municipality consists of one freguesia (civil parish), São Lourenço dos Órgãos. The freguesia is subdivided into the following settlements (population at the 2010 census):

- Achada Costa (pop: 176)
- Boca Larga (pop: 477)
- Carreira (pop: 122)
- Chã de Vaca (pop: 205)
- Covada (pop: 240)
- Funco Bandeira (pop: 157)
- Funco Marques (pop: 139)
- Fundura (pop: 112)
- João Goto (pop: 225)
- João Guela (pop: 228)
- João Teves (pop: 703, city)
- Lage (pop: 395)
- Lagedo (pop: 88)
- Levada (pop: 234)
- Longueira (pop: 326)
- Mato Raia (pop: 181)
- Montanha (pop: 462)
- Montanhinha (pop: 337)
- Órgãos Pequeno (pop: 479)
- Pedra Molar (pop: 402)
- Pico Antónia (pop: 628)
- Poilão Cabral (pop: 298)
- Ribeirão Galinha (pop: 472)
- São Jorge (pop: 6)
- Várzea Fernanxdes (pop: 112)

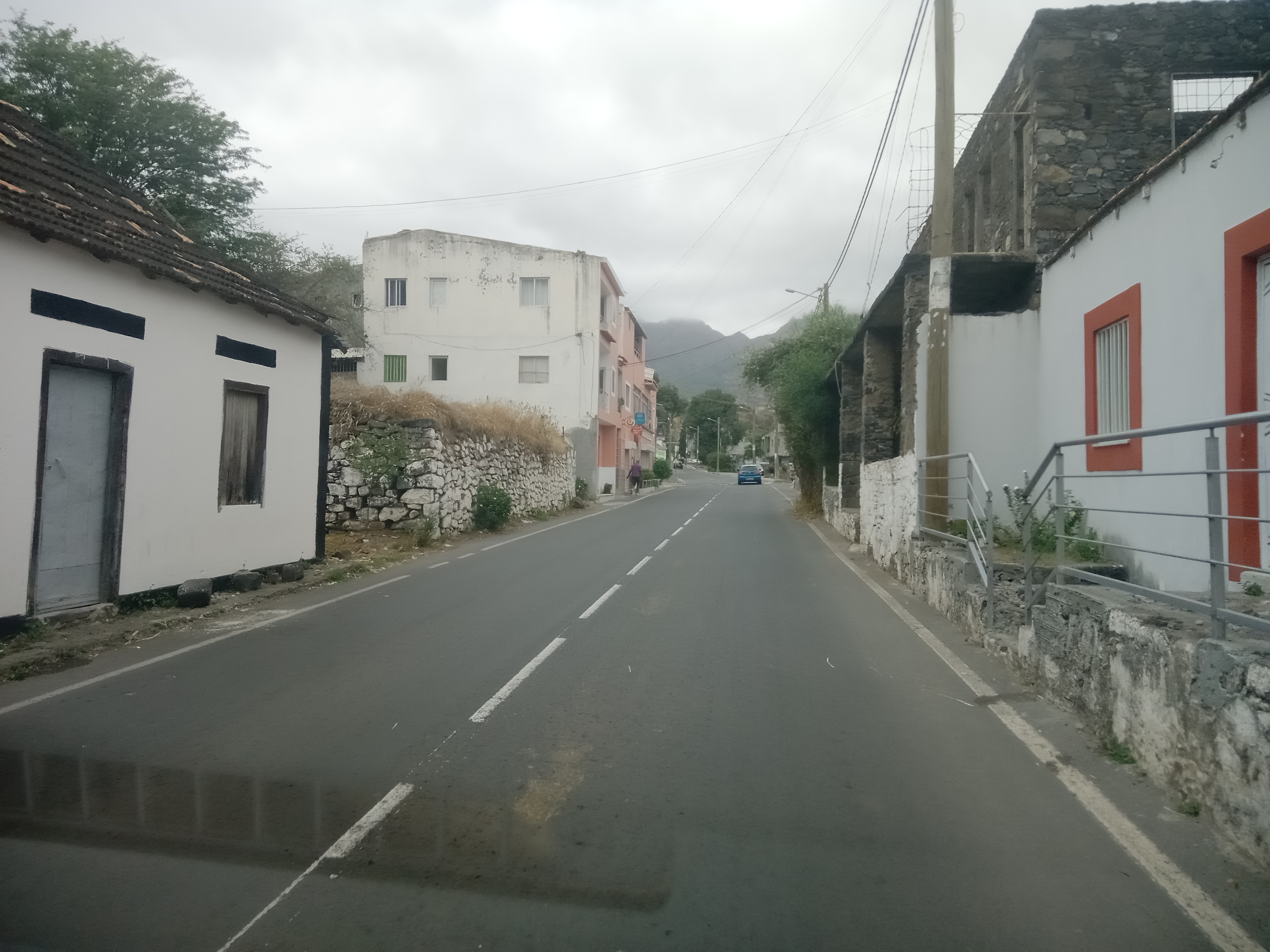
Downtown João Teves

== History ==
The municipality was created in 2005, when a parish of the older Municipality of Santa Cruz was separated to become the Municipality of São Lourenço dos Órgãos. Until 2008, it was run by the Installation Commission. Its first president was Victor Baessa, president of PAICV, who ruled for eight years until MpD won the 2016 elections.

== Demography ==
Population of São Lourenço dos Órgãos (1980—2010)
Year	Population
1980	6,722
1990	7,885
2000	7,781
2010	7,388

== Points of interests ==
- Jardim Botânico (Cape Verde) - Cape Verde's only botanical garden

== Persons ==
- Orlando Pantera, singer

== Politics ==
At the federal level, it belongs to the constituency of Santiago North. Since 2016, the Movement for Democracy (MpD) is the ruling party of the municipality. The results of the latest elections, in 2016:

Party	Municipal Council		Municipal Assembly	
Party	Votes%	Seats	Votes%	Seats
MpD	49.11	5	48.93	7
PAICV	47.94	0	48.17	6
