= Jardim Botânico Nacional Grandvaux Barbosa =

Botanical garden in Cape Verde

Coordinates: 15.049°N 23.604°W

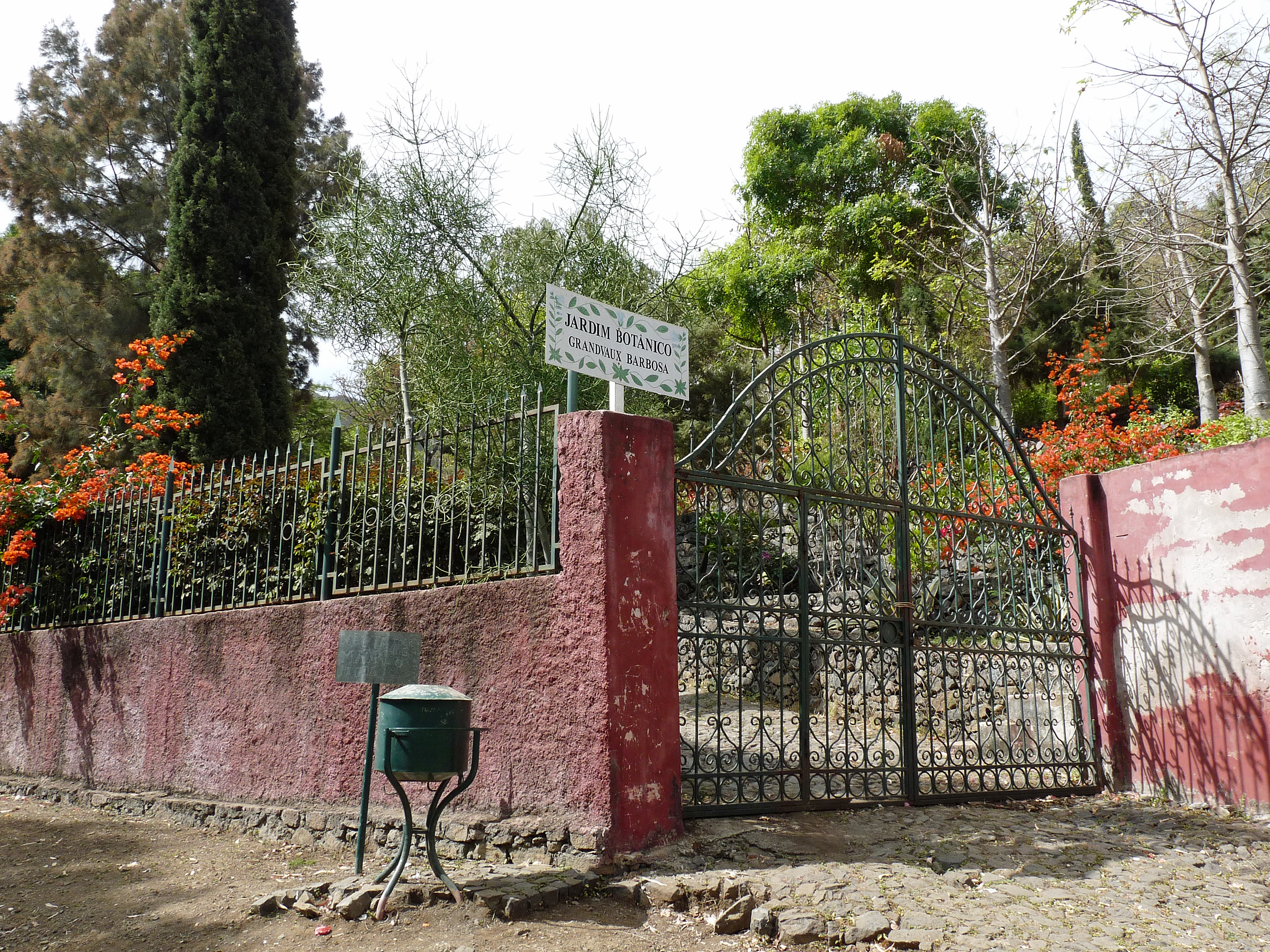
Entrance to the Botanical Garden

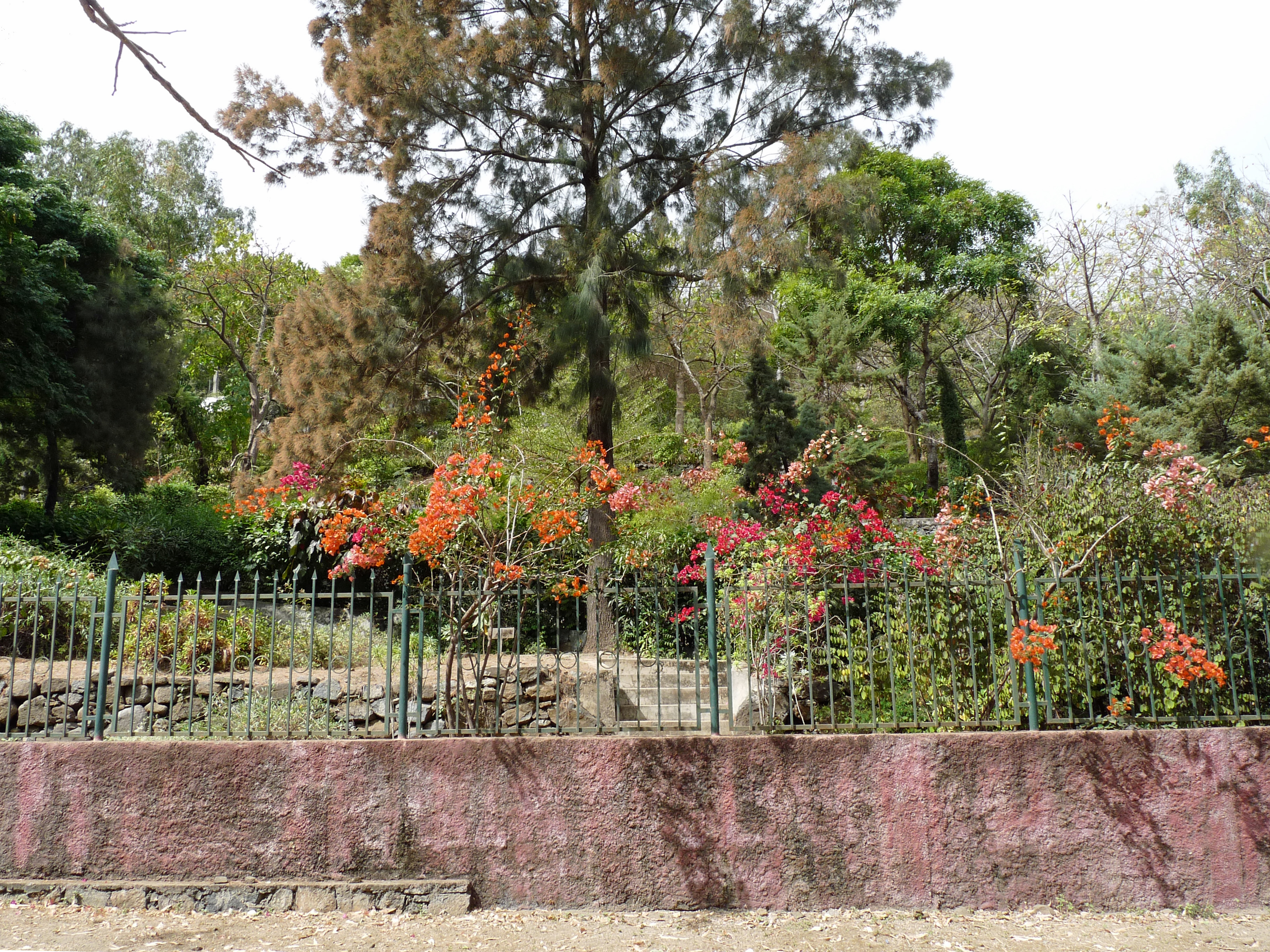
Enclosure of the Botanical Garden

The Jardim Botânico Nacional Grandvaux Barbosa is the only botanical garden in Cape Verde. The garden is located in São Jorge, in the middle of the island Santiago. Its collection focuses on endemic and native plants of Cape Verde.

The garden was created in 1986 and was named after the Franco-Portuguese botanist Luís Augusto Grandvaux Barbosa (1914-1983). It is located 400 m above sea level and covers 20,000 m2. It is part of the School of Agricultural and Environmental Sciences (the former "INIDA", National Institute of Agrarian Studies and Development), part of the University of Cape Verde.

Endemic and native plants in the garden include Phoenix atlantica, Euphorbia tuckeyana, Echium hypertropicum, Echium stenosiphon, Artemisia gorgonum, Micromeria forbesii, Aeonium gorgoneum and Campanula jacobaea.
