= Pedra Badejo =

- Settlement
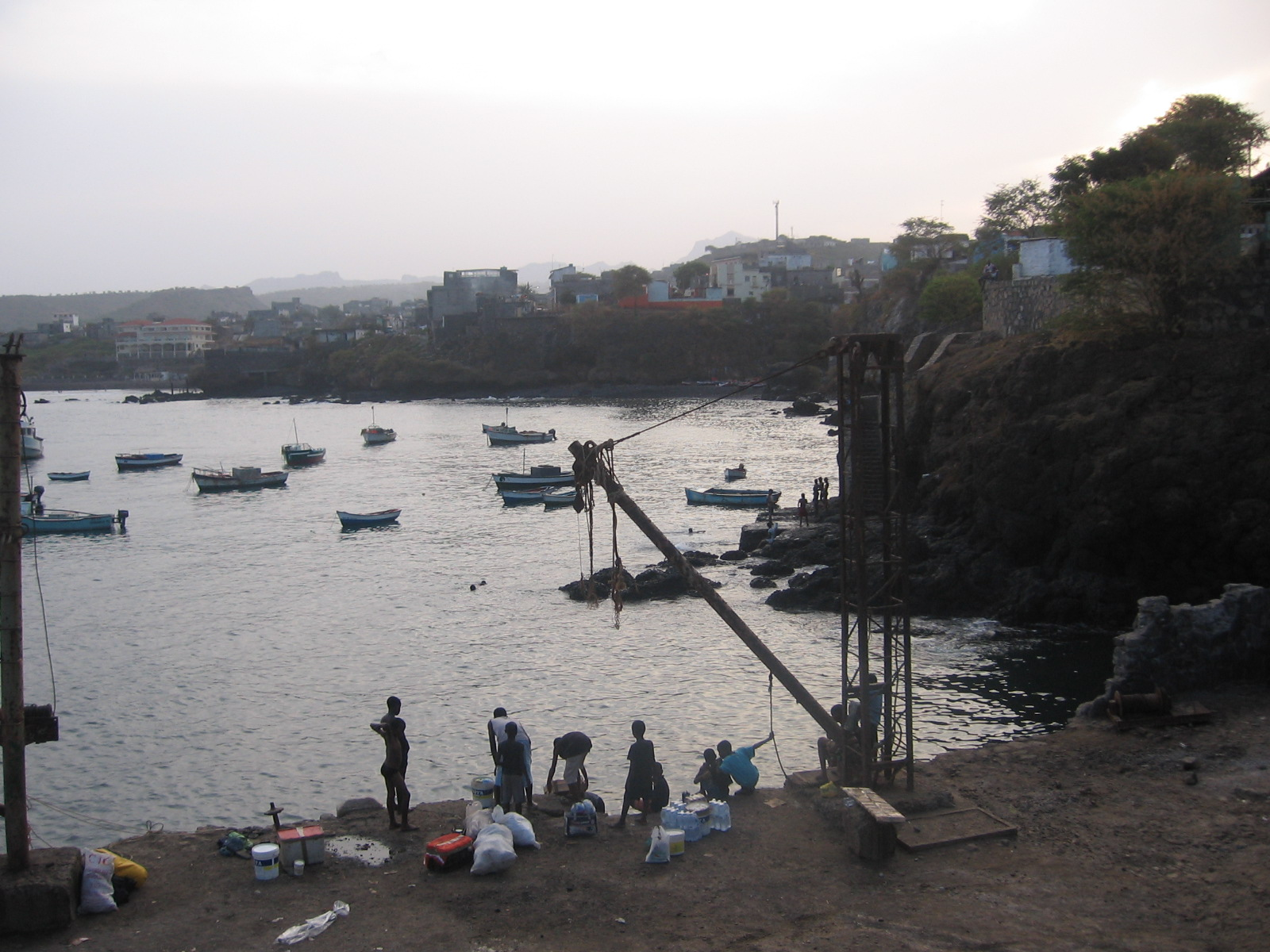

- Location within Cape Verde
- Coordinates: 15.137°N 23.534°W
- Country: Cape Verde
- Island: Santiago
- Municipality: Santa Cruz
- Civil parish: Santiago Maior
- Elevation: 35 m (115 ft)

Population (2010)
  - Total: 9,859
- Postal code: 7410
- ID: 73123

Pedra Badejo is a city in the eastern part of the island of Santiago, Cape Verde. It is on the east coast, 25 km (16 mi) north of the island capital Praia, 8 km (5.0 mi) southeast of Calheta de São Miguel and 15 km (9.3 mi) east of Assomada. It is the seat of Santa Cruz municipality. At the 2010 census, the town had 9,859 inhabitants.

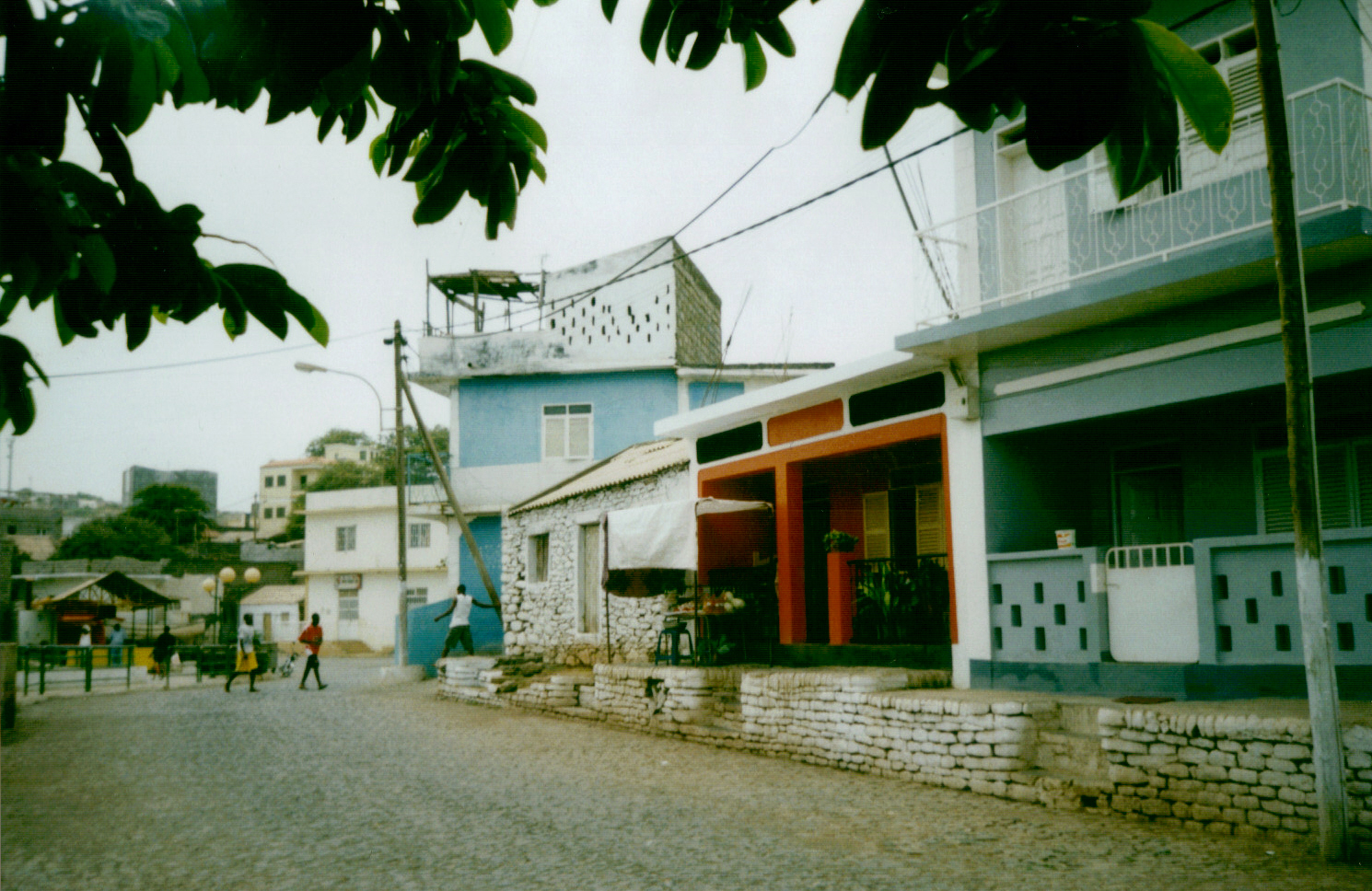
Main Street.

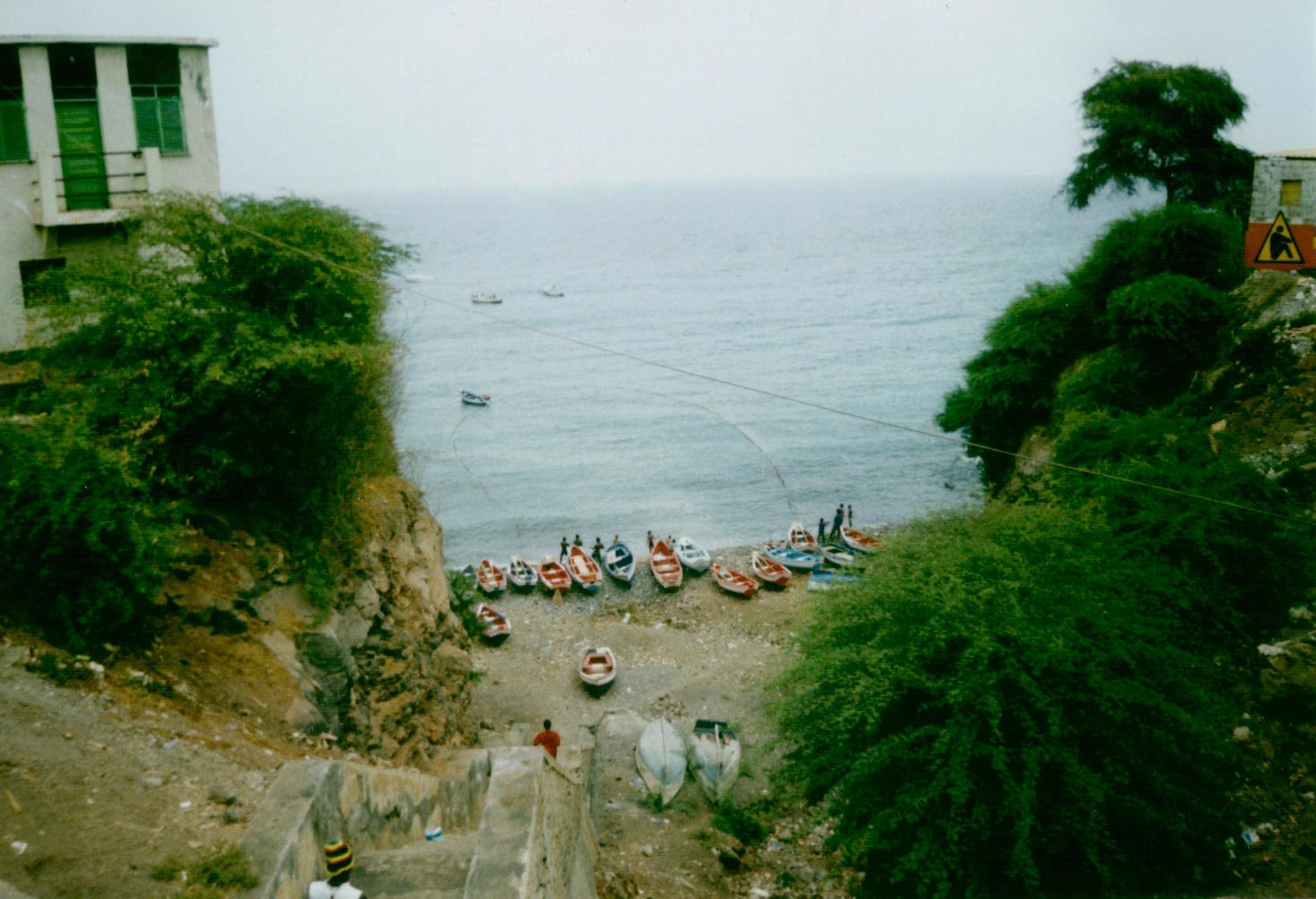
View to the harbour.

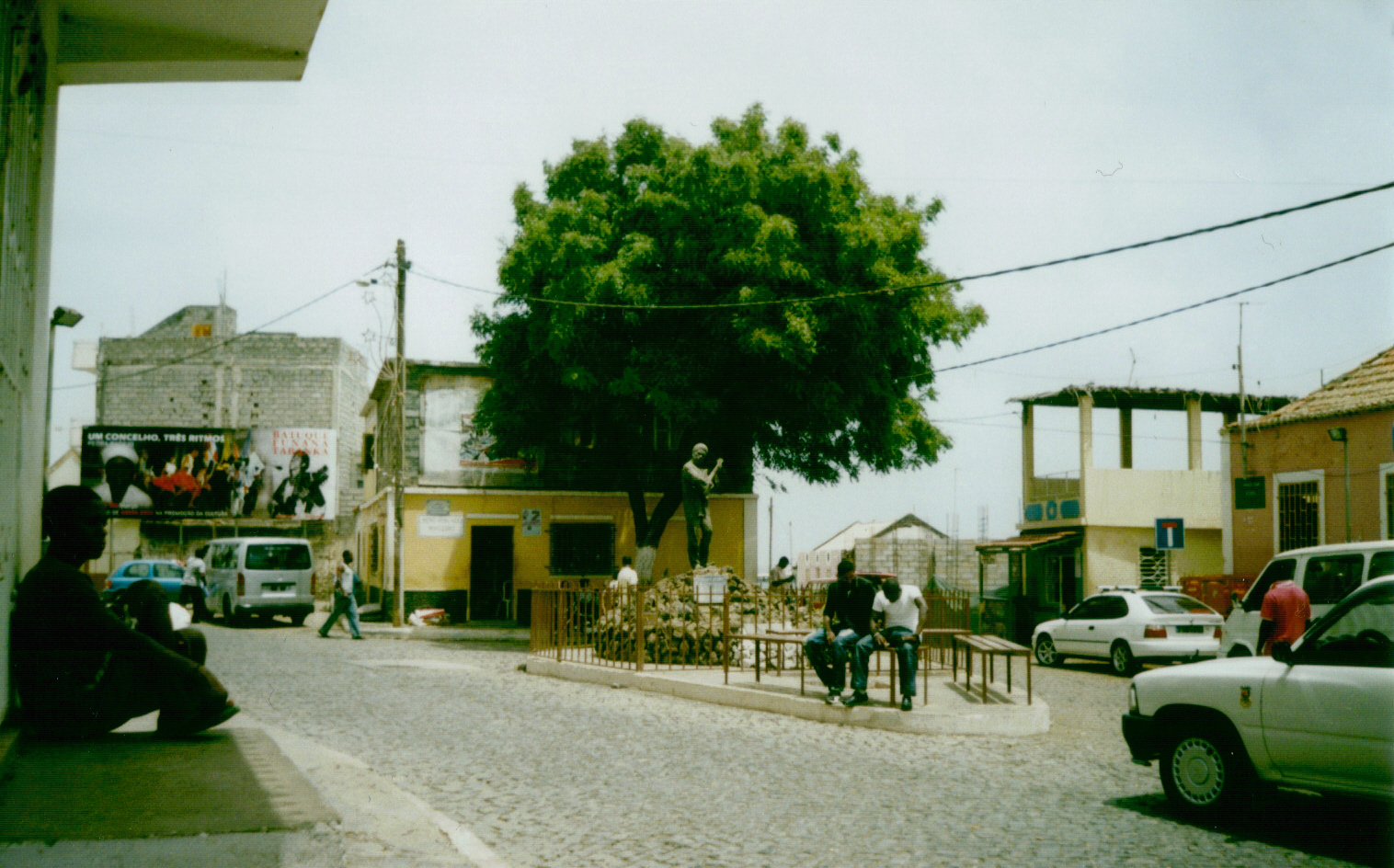
Market Place and monument.

== History ==
In 1971, Pedra Badejo became part of the new municipality of Santa Cruz and Pedra Badejo became its seat. In 2010, the town Pedra Badejo was awarded city status.

== Cityscape ==
There are a lot of shops in Main Street and in the Market Place. Many daytrippers from Praia visit the beach which is close to the center of the city. A former health center close to the beach was transformed into a hotel.

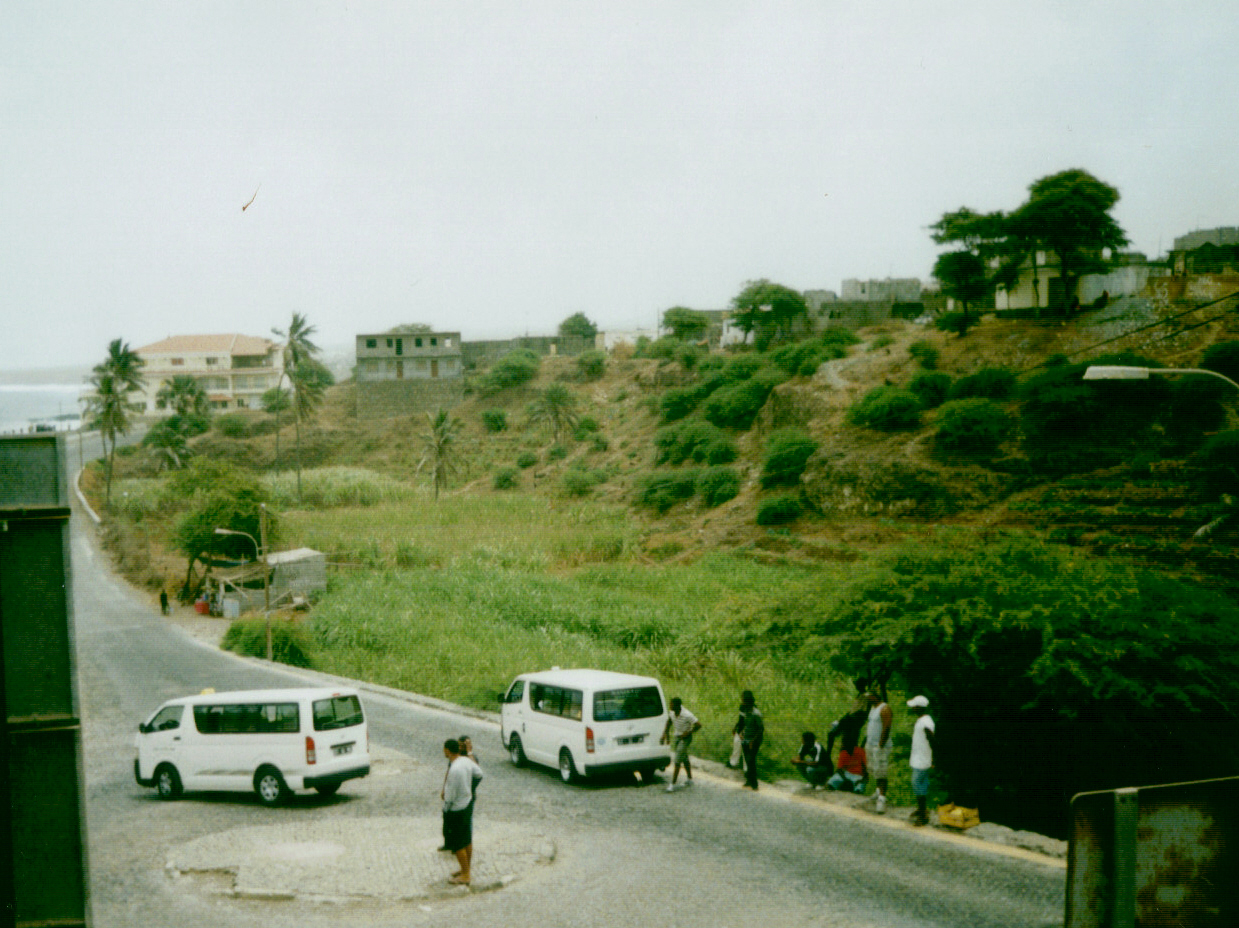
Irrigated land in town.

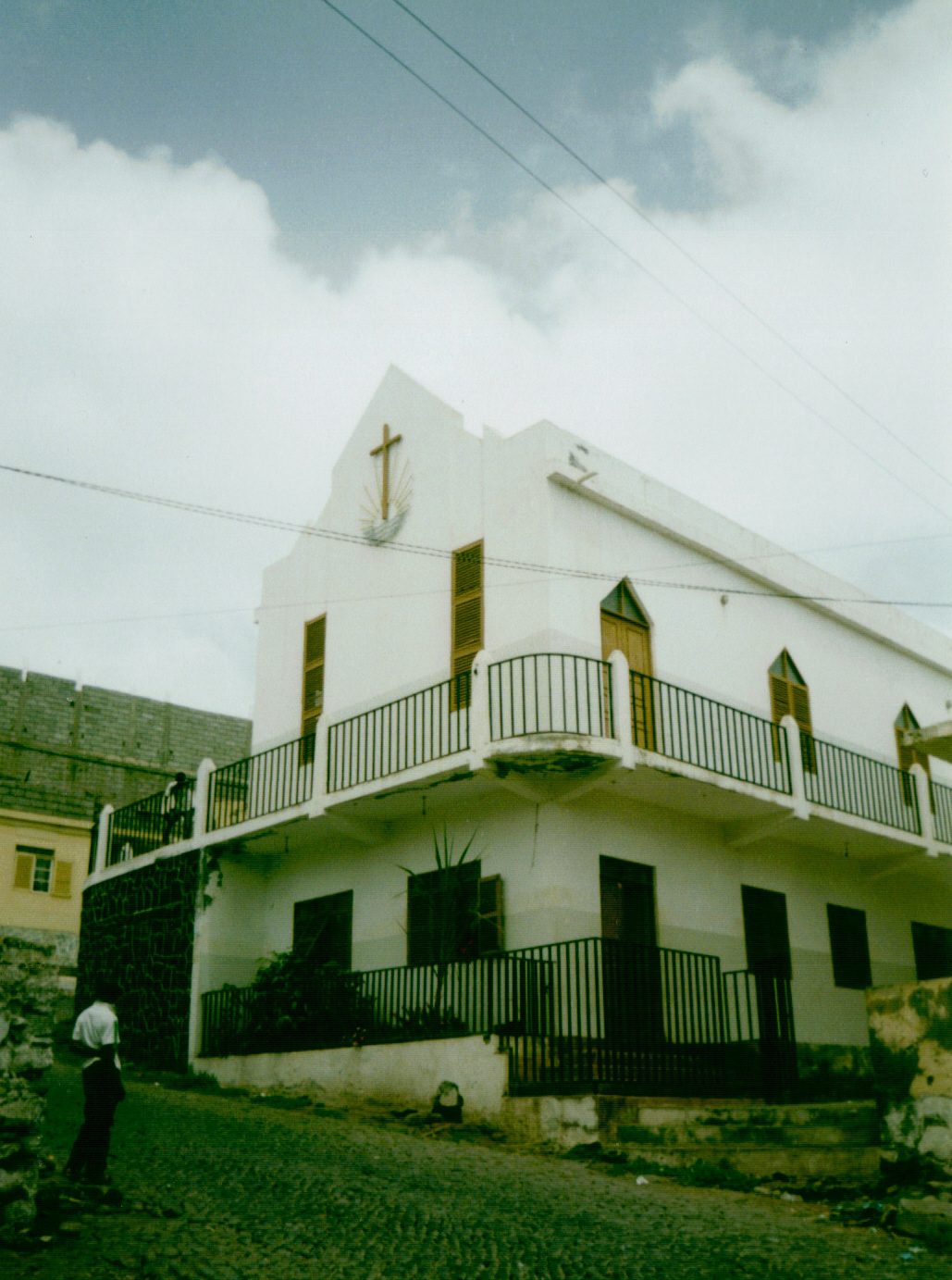
New Apostolic Church.

Pedra Badejo has a small fishing port and at least five churches: the modern Catholic Church is in the new, upper part of the city, and the smaller New Apostolic Church is in Main Street. A Presbyterian Church, a Nazarene Church, and a Baptist church also serve the community.

Southeast of the city are the Lagoas de Pedra Badejo, an important wetland area. The city is surrounded by irrigated land. An artificial lake (Barragem de Poilão) was laid out between the villages Poilão and Levada with a fill dam which was completed in 2006. The reservoir has a capacity of 1.7 million cubic meters making the drip irrigation of 64 ha of land corresponding to about 100 farms possible. The construction of the first concrete dam of Cape Verde was paid and planned by China. There is an information pavilion in the South of the artificial lake where some rare birds can be observed.

== Demographics ==
Year	Population
1990	5,302
2000	8,492
2010	9,859

== Transportation ==
The national road from Praia to Tarrafal via Calheta de São Miguel (EN1-ST02) passes through Pedra Badejo. Minibus services (yasi or hilux) are offered in Pedra Badejo and connect the cities of Praia and Tarrafal. It is about 30 km from Nelson Mandela International Airport and 33 km from the ferry port of Praia.

== Notable people ==
- Lito, former footballer (soccer player), currently manager of Sporting Praia
- Djaniny, footballer
- Elida Almeida, singer
