= João Teves =

- Settlement
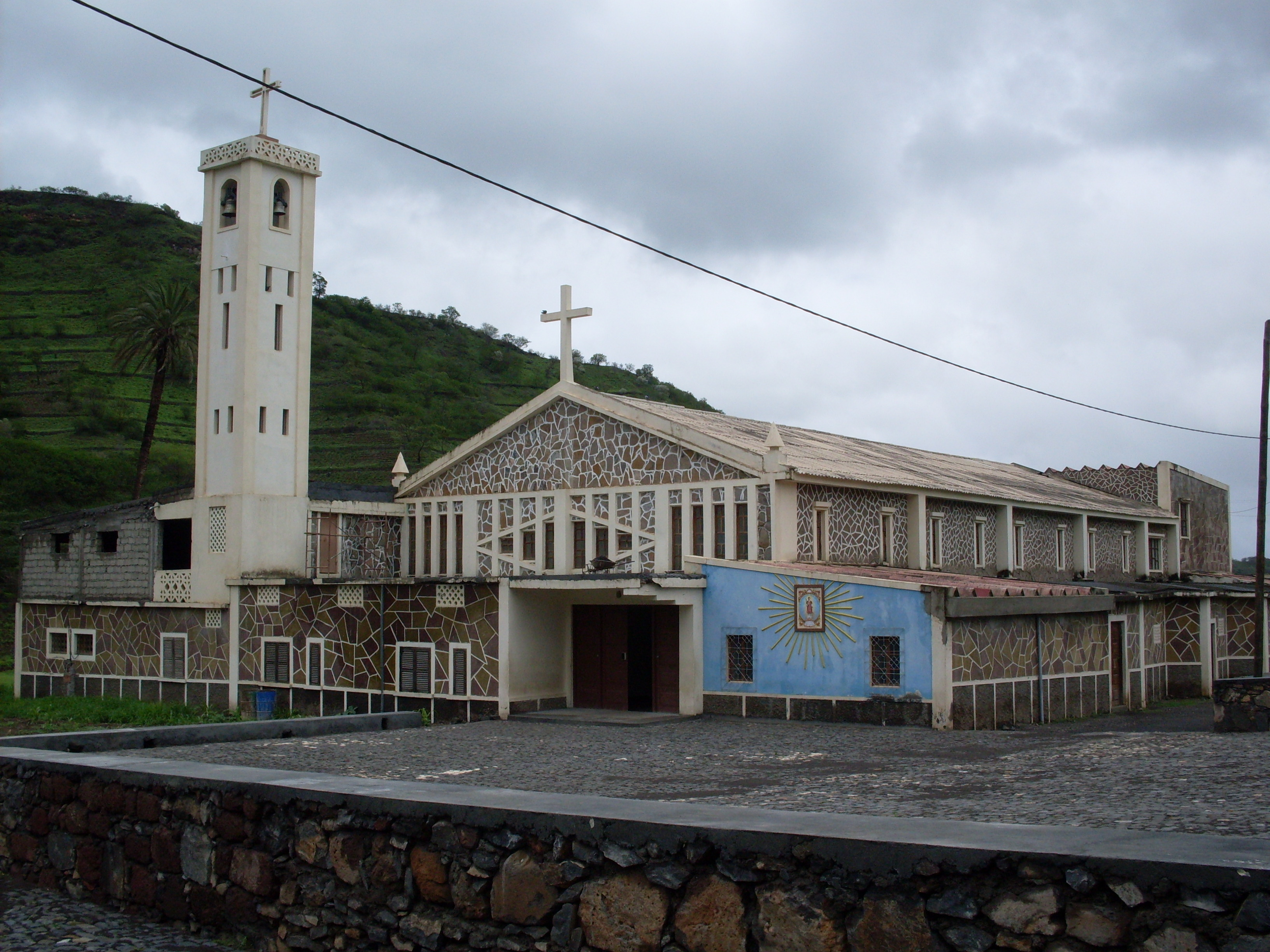
- Igreja de São Lourenço dos Órgãos

- Location within Cape Verde
- Coordinates: 15.068°N 23.589°W
- Country: Cape Verde
- Island: Santiago
- Municipality: São Lourenço dos Órgãos
- Civil parish: São Lourenço dos Órgãos

Population (2010)
  - Total: 703
- Postal code: 7425
- ID: 78105

João Teves is a city in the central part of the island of Santiago, Cape Verde. It is situated 19 km northwest of the capital Praia, on the national road from Praia to Assomada (EN1-ST01). It is the seat of São Lourenço dos Órgãos municipality. A source river of the Ribeira Seca flows through the town.

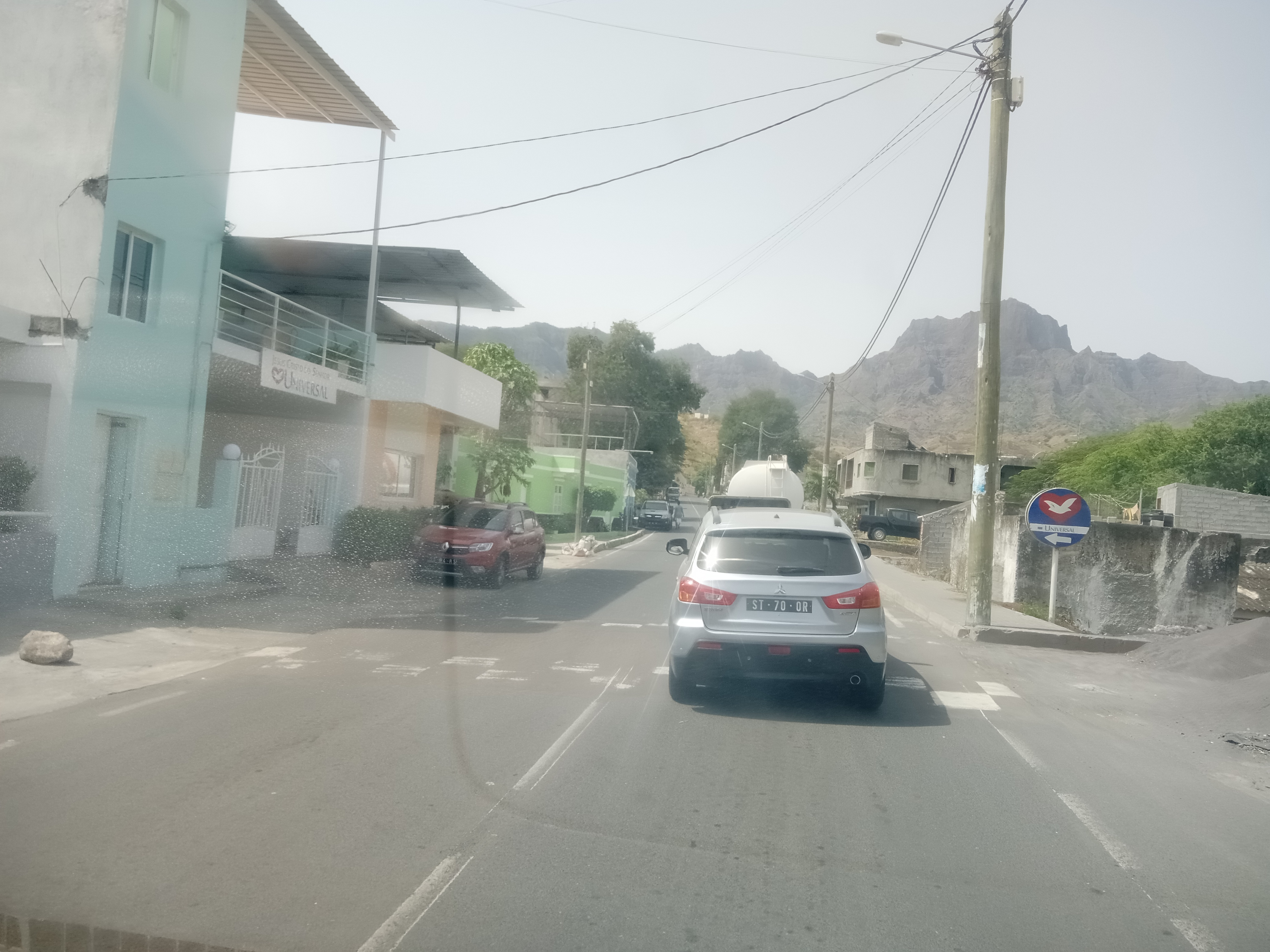
Downtown João Teves
